= Canada at the 2019 Pan American Games =

- IOC code: CAN
- NOC: Canadian Olympic Committee

in Lima, Peru 26 July–11 August 2019
- Competitors: 477 in 35 sports
- Flag bearer (opening): Scott Tupper
- Flag bearer (closing): Ellie Black
- Medals Ranked 4th: Gold 35 Silver 65 Bronze 52 Total 152

Pan American Games appearances (overview)
- 1955; 1959; 1963; 1967; 1971; 1975; 1979; 1983; 1987; 1991; 1995; 1999; 2003; 2007; 2011; 2015; 2019; 2023; 2027

Canada competed in the 2019 Pan American Games in Lima, Peru from July 26 to August 11, 2019.

In November 2018, two time Olympian in rowing Douglas Vandor was named as the team's chef de mission.

On July 23, 2019, it as announced that field hockey team captain Scott Tupper would be the country's flag bearer during the opening ceremony. After winning five medals for a second straight games, artistic gymnast Ellie Black was named as the country's flag bearer during the closing ceremony.

Canadian athletes competed in 35 of 39 sports, with the exceptions being basque pelota, bodybuilding, football and roller sports.

== Competitors ==
The following is the list of number of competitors (per gender) participating at the games per sport/discipline.

Sport	Men	Women	Total
Archery	3	4	7
Artistic swimming	—N/a	9	9
Athletics (track and field)	18	26	44
Badminton	4	4	8
Baseball	24	0	24
Basketball	0	12	12
Bowling	2	2	4
Boxing	2	4	6
Canoeing	9	9	18
Cycling	4	8	12
Diving	4	4	8
Equestrian	2	10	12
Fencing	9	9	18
Field hockey	16	16	32
Golf	2	2	4
Gymnastics	7	14	21
Judo	4	3	7
Karate	1	3	4
Handball	0	14	14
Modern pentathlon	2	3	5
Racquetball	2	2	4
Rowing	5	8	13
Rugby sevens	12	12	24
Sailing	8	6	14
Shooting	11	7	18
Softball	0	15	15
Squash	3	3	6
Swimming	4	16	20
Surfing	3	4	7
Table tennis	3	3	6
Taekwondo	7	6	13
Tennis	0	3	3
Triathlon	3	3	6
Volleyball	2	14	16
Water polo	11	11	22
Water skiing	3	3	6
Weightlifting	1	3	4
Wrestling	7	4	11
Total	198	279	477

== Medallists ==
Medal	Name	Sport	Event	Date
Gold	Andréanne Langlois; Alexa Irvin; Alanna Bray-Lougheed; Anna Negulic	Canoeing	Women's K-4 500 metres	July 28
Gold	Canada women's national rugby sevens team: Delaney Aikens; Pam Buisa; Emma Chown; Caroline Crossley; Olivia de Couvreur; Asia Hogan-Rochester; Sara Kaljuvee; Tausani Levale; Kaili Lukan; Kayla Moleschi; Breanne Nicholas; Temitope Ogunjimi	Rugby sevens	Women's tournament	July 28
Gold	Ellie Black	Gymnastics	Women's artistic individual all-around	July 29
Gold	Jill Irving; Tina Irwin; Lindsay Kellock; Naïma Moreira-Laliberté	Equestrian	Team dressage	July 29
Gold	Dominik Crête	Canoeing	Men's K-1 200 metres	July 30
Gold	Andréanne Langlois; Alanna Bray-Lougheed	Canoeing	Women's K-2 500 metres	July 30
Gold	Ellie Black	Gymnastics	Women's vault	July 30
Gold	Dorien Llewellyn	Water skiing	Men's overall	July 30
Gold	Claudia Holzner; Jacqueline Simoneau	Artistic swimming	Women's duet	July 31
Gold	Brooklyn Moors	Gymnastics	Women's floor	July 31
Gold	Emily Armstrong; Andrée-Anne Côté; Camille Fiola-Dion; Rebecca Harrower; Claudia Holzner; Audrey Joly; Halle Pratt; Jacqueline Simoneau; Catherine Barrett	Artistic swimming	Women's team	July 31
Gold	Jennifer Abel; Pamela Ware	Diving	Women's synchronized 3 metre springboard	August 1
Gold	Jason Ho-shue; Nyl Yakura	Badminton	Men's doubles	August 2
Gold	Rachel Honderich; Kristen Tsai	Badminton	Women's doubles	August 2
Gold	Michelle Li	Badminton	Women's singles	August 2
Gold	Joshua Hurlburt-Yu; Josephine Wu	Badminton	Mixed doubles	August 2
Gold	Meaghan Benfeito	Diving	Women's 10 metre platform	August 3
Gold	Kelsey Mitchell	Cycling	Women's individual sprint	August 4
Gold	Meaghan Benfeito; Caeli McKay	Diving	Women's 10m Synchro Platform	August 4
Gold	Jérémy Chartier	Gymnastics	Men's trampoline	August 5
Gold	Samantha Smith	Gymnastics	Women's trampoline	August 5
Gold	Jennifer Abel	Diving	Women's 3 metre springboard	August 5
Gold	Eugene Wang; Zhang Mo	Table tennis	Mixed doubles	August 5
Gold	Natasha Wodak	Athletics	Women's 10,000 m	August 6
Gold	Damian Warner	Athletics	Men's decathlon	August 7
Gold	Sage Watson	Athletics	Women's 400 m hurdles	August 8
Gold	Kate Haber; Jaclyn Stelmaszyk	Rowing	Women's lightweight double sculls	August 9
Gold	Jessica Sevick	Rowing	Women's single sculls	August 9
Gold	Sarah Douglas	Sailing	Women's laser radial	August 9
Gold	Justina Di Stasio	Wrestling	Women's 76 kg	August 9
Gold	Tessa Cieplucha	Swimming	Women's 400 metre individual medley	August 9
Gold	Marco Arop	Athletics	Men's 800 m	August 10
Gold	Geneviève Lalonde	Athletics	Women's 3000 metres steeplechase	August 10
Gold	Crispin Duenas; Brian Maxwell; Eric Peters	Archery	Men's recurve team	August 11
Gold	Crispin Duenas	Archery	Men's recurve individual	August 11
Silver	Drew Hodges; Craig Spence	Canoeing	Men's C-2 1000 metres	July 27
Silver	Ellie Black; Brooklyn Moors; Shallon Olsen; Isabela Onyshko; Victoria-Kayen Woo	Gymnastics	Women's artistic team all-around	July 27
Silver	Jinsu Ha; Michelle Lee	Taekwondo	Mixed poomsae pairs	July 28
Silver	Mark Bush; AJ Assadian; Jinsu Ha; Valerie Ho; Michelle Lee	Taekwondo	Mixed poomsae freestyle teams	July 28
Silver	Canada men's rugby sevens team: Sean Duke; Admir Cejvanovic; Brennig Prevost; Phil Berna; Luke McCloskey; Cooper Coats; Josiah Morra; Josh Thiel; Nathan Hirayama; Pat Kay; Harry Jones; Adam Zaruba	Rugby sevens	Men's tournament	July 28
Silver	Shawn Delierre; Nick Sachvie	Squash	Men's doubles	July 28
Silver	Samantha Cornett; Danielle Letourneau	Squash	Women's doubles	July 28
Silver	Skylar Park	Taekwondo	Women's 57 kg	July 28
Silver	Marshall Hughes	Canoeing	Men's K-1 1000	July 29
Silver	Jarret Kenke; Jacob Steele	Canoeing	Men's K-2 1000	July 29
Silver	Andréanne Langlois	Canoeing	Women's K-1 500	July 29
Silver	Desirae Ridenour; Charles Paquet; Hannah Rose Henry; Alexis Lepage	Triathlon	Mixed relay	July 29
Silver	Stephen Neveu	Water skiing	Men's slalom	July 29
Silver	Dorien Llewellyn	Water skiing	Men's tricks	July 29
Silver	Whitney McClintock	Water skiing	Women's slalom	July 29
Silver	Whitney McClintock	Water skiing	Women's jump	July 29
Silver	Boady Santavy	Weightlifting	Men's 96 kg	July 29
Silver	Andréanne Langlois	Canoeing	Women's K-1 200	July 30
Silver	Whitney McClintock	Water skiing	Women's overall	July 30
Silver	Tina Irwin	Equestrian	Individual dressage	July 31
Silver	Samantha Cornett; Danielle Letourneau; Hollie Naughton	Squash	Women's team	July 31
Silver	Ellie Black	Gymnastics	Women's beam	July 31
Silver	Kelsey Mitchell; Amelia Walsh	Cycling	Women's team sprint	August 1
Silver	Myriam Da Silva	Boxing	Women's 69 kg	August 1
Silver	Brian Yang	Badminton	Men's singles	August 2
Silver	Rachel Honderich	Badminton	Women's singles	August 2
Silver	Nyl Yakura; Kristen Tsai	Badminton	Mixed doubles	August 2
Silver	Erin Attwell; Miriam Brouwer; Maggie Coles-Lyster; Laurie Jussaume	Cycling	Women's team pursuit	August 2
Silver	Vincent Riendeau; Nathan Zsombor-Murray	Diving	Men's 10m Synchro Platform	August 2
Silver	Caeli McKay	Diving	Women's 10 metre platform	August 3
Silver	Philippe Gagné; François Imbeau-Dulac	Diving	Men's synchronized 3 metre springboard	August 3
Silver	Lois Betteridge	Canoeing	Women's slalom C-1	August 4
Silver	Miriam Brouwer; Maggie Coles-Lyster	Cycling	Women's madison	August 4
Silver	Katherine Uchida	Gymnastics	Women's rhythmic individual hoop	August 4
Silver	Katherine Uchida	Gymnastics	Women's rhythmic individual ball	August 4
Silver	Canada men's baseball team: Ben Abram; Phillippe Aumont; Jordan Balazovic; Eric Cerantola; Michael Crouse; Wes Darvill; RJ Freure; Tyson Gillies; Dustin Houle; Edouard Julien; Ryan Kellogg; Jordan Lennerton; Chris Leroux; Jonathan Malo; Will McAffer; Dustin Molleken; Connor Panas; Tristan Pompey; Jordan Procyshen; Jasvir Rakkar; Scott Richmond; Evan Rutckyj; Rene Tosoni; Eric Wood	Baseball	Men's tournament	August 4
Silver	Natalie Garcia	Gymnastics	Women's rhythmic individual clubs	August 5
Silver	Jessica Guo	Fencing	Women's individual foil	August 5
Silver	Danica Ludlow	Swimming	Women's 400 metre freestyle	August 6
Silver	Mary-Sophie Harvey	Swimming	Women's 200 metre butterfly	August 6
Silver	Danielle Hanus	Swimming	Women's 100 metre butterfly	August 7
Silver	Jessie Loutit; Larissa Werbicki	Rowing	Coxless Pair	August 8
Silver	Alanna Goldie; Jessica Guo; Eleanor Harvey; Gabriella Page	Fencing	Women's team foil	August 8
Silver	Alexia Zevnik	Swimming	Women's 100 metre freestyle	August 8
Silver	Danielle Hanus	Swimming	Women's 100 metre backstroke	August 8
Silver	Javier Acevedo; James Dergousoff; Haley Black; Danielle Hanus; Kyla Leibel; Alexia Zevnik	Swimming	Mixed 4 × 100 metre medley relay	August 8
Silver	Liz Gleadle	Athletics	Women's javelin throw	August 9
Silver	Brittany Crew	Athletics	Women's shot put	August 9
Silver	Olivia Di Bacco	Wrestling	Women's 68 kg	August 9
Silver	Jessica O'Connell	Athletics	Women's 5000 m	August 9
Silver	Ashlan Best; Khamica Bingham; Leya Buchanan; Crystal Emmanuel	Athletics	Women's 4 × 100 m relay	August 9
Silver	Canada women's field hockey team: Kaitlyn Williams; Elise Wong; Danielle Hennig; Karli Johansen; Sara McManus; Shanlee Johnston; Anna Mollenhauer; Natalie Sourisseau; Amanda Woodcroft; Madeline Secco; Katherine Wright; Rachel Donohoe; Hannah Haughn; Holly Stewart; Brienne Stairs; Stephanie Norlander	Field hockey	Women's tournament	August 9
Silver	Michael Mason	Athletics	Men's high jump	August 9
Silver	Alyson Ackman; Mary-Sophie Harvey; Danica Ludlow; Katerine Savard	Swimming	Women's 4 × 200 metre freestyle relay	August 9
Silver	Canada women's water polo team: Krystina Alogbo; Joelle Bekhazi; Kyra Christmas; Monika Eggens; Shae Fournier; Jessica Gaudreault; Elyse Lemay-Lavoie; Kelly McKee; Hayley McKelvey; Kindred Paul; Emma Wright	Water polo	Women's tournament	August 10
Silver	Canada women's softball team: Jenna Caira; Emma Entzminger; Larissa Franklin; Jenny Gilbert; Sara Groenewegen; Victoria Hayward; Danielle Lawrie; Janet Leung; Joey Lye; Erika Polidori; Morgan Rackel; Kaleigh Rafter; Jennifer Salling; Holly Speers; Natalie Wideman	Softball	Women's tournament	August 10
Silver	Kyra Constantine; Natassha McDonald; Aiyanna Stiverne; Sage Watson	Athletics	Women's 4 × 400 metres relay	August 10
Silver	Luke Ramsay	Sailing	Sunfish	August 10
Silver	Shaul Gordon; Joseph Polossifakis; Fares Arfa; Eli Schenkel	Fencing	Men's team sabre	August 10
Silver	Kathryn Campbell	Karate	Women's 55 kg	August 10
Silver	Daniel Gaysinsky	Karate	Men's +84 kg	August 10
Silver	Canada men's field hockey team: Brandon Pereira; Scott Tupper; Oliver Scholfield; Keegan Pereira; Balraj Panesar; Adam Froese; Gordon Johnston; Brenden Bissett; James Wallace; Matthew Pearson; John Smythe; Iain Smythe; James Kirkpatrick; Sukhi Panesar; Taylor Curran; David Carter	Field hockey	Women's tournament	August 10
Silver	Canada men's water polo team: Nicolas Constantin-Bicari; Jérémie Côté; Bogdan Djerkovic; Reuel D'Souza; Aleksa Gardijan; Matthew Halajian; Gaelan Patterson; Milan Radenovic; Aria Soleimanipak; Mark Spooner; George Torakis	Water polo	Men's tournament	August 10
Silver	Alyson Ackman; Haley Black; Mackenzie Glover; Danielle Hanus; Mary-Sophie Harvey; Faith Knelson; Katerine Savard; Alexia Zevnik	Swimming	Women's 4 × 100 metre medley relay	August 10
Bronze	Samantha Cornett	Squash	Women's singles	July 27
Bronze	Hollie Naughton	Squash	Women's singles	July 27
Bronze	Abbas Assadian Jr.	Taekwondo	Men's poomsae individual	July 27
Bronze	Andrew Schnell; Hollie Naughton	Squash	Mixed doubles	July 27
Bronze	Hervan Nkogho	Taekwondo	Men's 68 kg	July 28
Bronze	Zachary Clay; René Cournoyer; Justin Karstadt; Cory Paterson; Sam Zakutney	Gymnastics	Men's artistic team all-around	July 28
Bronze	Drew Hodges	Canoeing	Men's C-1 1000 metres	July 29
Bronze	Anne Lavoie-Parent; Rowan Hardy-Kavanagh	Canoeing	Women's C-2 500 metres	July 29
Bronze	Paige Rini	Water skiing	Women's slalom	July 29
Bronze	Paige Rini	Water skiing	Women's tricks	July 29
Bronze	Dorien Llewellyn	Water skiing	Men's jump	July 29
Bronze	Cory Paterson	Gymnastics	Men's artistic individual all-around	July 29
Bronze	Paige Rini	Water skiing	Women's overall	July 30
Bronze	Shallon Olsen	Gymnastics	Women's vault	July 30
Bronze	Ellie Black	Gymnastics	Women's uneven bars	July 30
Bronze	Tammara Thibeault	Boxing	Women's 75 kg	July 30
Bronze	Shawn Delierre; Nick Sachvie; Andrew Schnell	Squash	Men's team	July 31
Bronze	Curtis Wennberg; Amanda Chudoba	Shooting	Mixed pairs trap	July 31
Bronze	Jason Ho-Shue	Badminton	Men's singles	August 1
Bronze	Dana Cooke; Colleen Loach; Jessica Phoenix; Karl Slezak	Equestrian	Team eventing	August 4
Bronze	Mathea Olin	Surfing	Women's longboard	August 4
Bronze	Keenan Simpson	Canoeing	Men's slalom K-1	August 4
Bronze	Keenan Simpson	Canoeing	Men's extreme slalom K-1	August 4
Bronze	Philippe Gagné	Diving	Men's 3m Springboard	August 4
Bronze	Eleanor Harvey	Fencing	Women's individual foil	August 5
Bronze	Alicia Côté; Zhang Mo	Table tennis	Women's doubles	August 5
Bronze	Vincent Riendeau	Diving	Men's 10m Platform	August 5
Bronze	Rachel Cliff	Athletics	Women's 10,000 m	August 6
Bronze	Maximilien Van Haaster	Fencing	Men's individual foil	August 6
Bronze	Gabriella Page	Fencing	Women's individual sabre	August 6
Bronze	Alyson Ackman	Swimming	Women's 400 metre freestyle	August 6
Bronze	Faith Knelson	Swimming	Women's 100 metre breaststroke	August 6
Bronze	Alyson Ackman; Kyla Leibel; Katerine Savard; Alexia Zevnik	Swimming	Women's 4 × 100 metre freestyle relay	August 6
Bronze	Laurie Jussaume	Cycling	Women's road time trial	August 7
Bronze	Eugene Wang	Table tennis	Men's singles	August 7
Bronze	Shaul Gordon	Fencing	Men's individual sabre	August 7
Bronze	Pierce LePage	Athletics	Men's decathlon	August 7
Bronze	Mackenzie Glover	Swimming	Women's 200 metre backstroke	August 7
Bronze	Alysha Newman	Athletics	Women's pole vault	August 8
Bronze	William Paulson	Athletics	Men's 1500 m	August 8
Bronze	Jade Parsons	Wrestling	Women's 53 kg	August 8
Bronze	Justin Barnes; Alex Heinzemann	Sailing	Men's 49er	August 9
Bronze	Eli Schenkel; Maximilien Van Haaster; Mikhail Sweet; Seraphim Hsieh Jarov	Fencing	Men's team foil	August 9
Bronze	Gabriella Page; Marissa Ponich; Pamela Brind'Amour; Eleanor Harvey	Fencing	Women's team sabre	August 9
Bronze	Darthe Capellan	Wrestling	Men's freestyle 57 kg	August 9
Bronze	Mary-Sophie Harvey	Swimming	Women's 400 metre individual medley	August 9
Bronze	Alicia Côté; Ivy Liao; Zhang Mo	Table tennis	Women's team	August 10
Bronze	Jevon Balfour	Wrestling	Men's freestyle 74 kg	August 10
Bronze	Korey Jarvis	Wrestling	Men's freestyle 125 kg	August 10
Bronze	Mohab Elnahas	Judo	Men's 90 kg	August 10
Bronze	Bailey Andison	Swimming	Women's 200 metre individual medley	August 10
Bronze	Eric Peters	Archery	Men's recurve individual	August 11
Bronze	Austin Connelly; Joey Savoie; Mary Parsons; Brigitte Thibault	Golf	Mixed team	August 11

Medals by sport/discipline
Sport	1st place, gold medalist(s)	2nd place, silver medalist(s)	3rd place, bronze medalist(s)	Total
Athletics	5	6	4	15
Gymnastics	5	5	4	14
Diving	4	3	2	9
Badminton	4	3	1	8
Canoeing	3	6	4	13
Rowing	2	1	0	3
Archery	2	0	1	3
Artistic swimming	2	0	0	2
Swimming	1	8	6	15
Water skiing	1	5	4	10
Cycling	1	3	1	5
Wrestling	1	1	4	6
Equestrian	1	1	1	3
Sailing	1	1	1	3
Rugby sevens	1	1	0	2
Table tennis	1	0	3	4
Taekwondo	0	3	2	5
Fencing	0	3	6	9
Squash	0	3	4	7
Field hockey	0	2	0	2
Karate	0	2	0	2
Water polo	0	2	0	2
Boxing	0	1	1	2
Baseball	0	1	0	1
Softball	0	1	0	1
Triathlon	0	1	0	1
Weightlifting	0	1	0	1
Golf	0	0	1	1
Judo	0	0	1	1
Shooting	0	0	1	1
Surfing	0	0	1	1
Total	35	64	53	152

Medals by day
Day	1st place, gold medalist(s)	2nd place, silver medalist(s)	3rd place, bronze medalist(s)	Total
27 July	0	2	4	6
28 July	2	6	2	10
29 July	2	9	6	17
30 July	4	2	4	10
31 July	3	3	2	8
1 August	1	2	1	4
2 August	4	5	0	9
3 August	1	2	0	3
4 August	2	5	5	11
5 August	4	2	3	9
6 August	1	2	5	9
7 August	1	1	5	7
8 August	1	5	3	9
9 August	5	8	5	18
10 August	2	10	5	17
11 August	2	0	2	4
Total	35	64	53	152

Medals by gender
Day	1st place, gold medalist(s)	2nd place, silver medalist(s)	3rd place, bronze medalist(s)	Total
Women	24	40	25	89
Men	8	16	24	48
Mixed	3	7	4	14
Total	35	64	53	152

== Archery ==
The Canadian archery team consisted of seven athletes (three men and four women). At the first qualifier, Canada won three quota spots (one each in men's and women's recurve and an additional spot in women's compound). Canada later qualified a full men's and women's recurve team at the final qualification tournament. The team was officially named on June 19, 2019.

Men

Athlete	Event	Ranking Round		Round of 32	Round of 16	Quarterfinals	Semifinals	Final / BM	Rank
Athlete	Event	Score	Seed	Opposition Score	Opposition Score	Opposition Score	Opposition Score	Opposition Score	Rank
Crispin Duenas	Recurve individual	681	4 Q	Ortegon (ECU); W 6–0	Franco (CUB); W 7–1	Pineda (COL); W 6–2	Peters (CAN); W 6–2	D'Almeida (BRA); W 6–4	1st place, gold medalist(s)
Brian Maxwell	Recurve individual	638	26 Q	Alvarez (MEX); L 0–6	Did not advance				
Eric Peters	Recurve individual	661	9 Q	Alvarez (ECU); W 6–2	Boardman (MEX); W 7–3	Ellison (USA); W 6–0	Duenas (CAN); L 2–6	Oliveira (BRA); W 7–1	3rd place, bronze medalist(s)
Crispin Duenas; Brian Maxwell; Eric Peters	Recurve team	1980	4 Q	—N/a		Cuba; W 6–2	United States; W 5–1	Chile; W 5–4	1st place, gold medalist(s)

Women

Athlete	Event	Ranking Round		Round of 32	Round of 16	Quarterfinals	Semifinals	Final / BM	Rank
Athlete	Event	Score	Seed	Opposition Score	Opposition Score	Opposition Score	Opposition Score	Opposition Score	Rank
Stephanie Barrett	Recurve individual	641	7 Q	Sepúlveda (COL); L 4–6	Did not advance				
Virginie Chénier	Recurve individual	613	16 Q	Jerez (DOM); W 6–2	Valencia (MEX); L 1–7	Did not advance			
Mariessa Pinto	Recurve individual	606	22 Q	Leithold (ARG); L 1–7	Did not advance				
Bryanne Lameg	Compound individual	689	5 Q	—N/a	Bye	Pearce (USA); L 144–147	Did not advance		
Stephanie Barrett; Virginie Chénier; Mariessa Pinto	Recurve team	1860	4 Q	—N/a		Brazil; L 0–6	Did not advance		

Mixed

Athlete	Event	Ranking Round		Round of 16	Quarterfinals	Semifinals	Final / BM	Rank
Athlete	Event	Score	Seed	Opposition Score	Opposition Score	Opposition Score	Opposition Score	Rank
Crispin Duenas; Stephanie Barrett	Mixed team recurve	1322	4 Q	Bye	El Salvador; W 5–3	United States; L 2–6	Mexico; L 3–5	4

== Artistic swimming ==
Canada qualified a team of nine athletes automatically, as being the only member as part of zone four. The team was officially named on June 4, 2019.

Women

Athlete	Event	Technical Routine		Free Routine (Final)			
Athlete	Event	Points	Rank	Points	Rank	Total Points	Rank
Claudia Holzner; Jacqueline Simoneau	Duet	89.3343	1	90.7000	1	180.0343	1st place, gold medalist(s)
Emily Armstrong; Andrée-Anne Côté; Camille Fiola-Dion; Rebecca Harrower; Claudia Holzner; Audrey Joly; Halle Pratt; Jacqueline Simoneau; Catherine Barrett*	Team	88.9398	1	90.7333	1	179.6731	1st place, gold medalist(s)

- Catherine Barrett was the reserve swimmer.

== Athletics (track and field) ==
Canada's athletics (track and field) team of 44 athletes (18 men and 26 women) was named on June 26, 2019.

Key

- Note–Ranks given for track events are for the entire round
- Q = Qualified for the next round
- q = Qualified for the next round as a fastest loser or, in field events, by position without achieving the qualifying target
- NR = National record
- GR = Games record
- PB = Personal best
- DNF = Did not finish
- NM = No mark
- N/A = Round not applicable for the event
- Bye = Athlete not required to compete in round

Men
Track and road events

Athlete	Event	Semifinals		Final	
Athlete	Event	Result	Rank	Result	Rank
Mobolade Ajomale	100 m	10.54	16	Did not advance	
Gavin Smellie	100 m	10.43	10	Did not advance	
Jerome Blake	200 m	20.63 SB	5 Q	20.66	6
Brendon Rodney	200 m	20.74	9	Did not advance	
Philip Osei	400 m	DNF		Did not advance	
Marco Arop	800 m	1:48.71	4 GR PB	1:44.25	1st place, gold medalist(s)
William Paulson	1500 m	—N/a		3:41.15	3rd place, bronze medalist(s)
Ben Flanagan	10,000 m	—N/a		Did not advance	
Rory Linkletter	10,000 m	—N/a		28:38.49	6
Johnathan Cabral	110 m hurdles	Did not start		Did not advance	
Ryan Smeeton	3000 m steeplechase	—N/a		8:41.85	6
Mobolade Ajomale; Jerome Blake; Brendon Rodney; Gavin Smellie	4 × 100 m relay	—N/a		39.00	4
Evan Dunfee	20 km walk	—N/a		1:22:27	5
Mathieu Bilodeau	50 km walk	—N/a		DNF	

Field events

Athlete	Event	Final	
Athlete	Event	Distance	Position
Django Lovett	High jump	Did not start	
Michael Mason	High jump	2.28	2nd place, silver medalist(s)
Tim Nedow	Shot put	20.48	4

Combined events – Decathlon

Athlete	Event	100 m	LJ	SP	HJ	400 m	110H	DT	PV	JT	1500 m	Final	Rank
Pierce LePage	Result	10.51	7.64	14.35	2.00	47.74	14.15	38.85	5.10	54.57	5:01.67	8161	3rd place, bronze medalist(s)
Pierce LePage	Points	973	970	750	803	922	955	641	941	656	550	8161	3rd place, bronze medalist(s)
Damian Warner	Result	10.32	7.74	15.01	1.97	47.74	13.68	48.82	4.40	59.48	4:38.31	8513	1st place, gold medalist(s)
Damian Warner	Points	1018	995	790	776	920	1016	846	731	730	691	8513	1st place, gold medalist(s)

Women
Track and road events

Athlete	Event	Semifinals		Final	
Athlete	Event	Result	Rank	Result	Rank
Leya Buchanan	100 m	11.70	11	Did not advance	
Crystal Emmanuel	100 m	11.48	4 Q	11.41	7
Crystal Emmanuel	200 m	23.06	3 Q	22.89	4
Aiyanna Stiverne	200 m	24.25	19	Did not advance	
Kyra Constantine	400 m	52.92	7 q	51.99	5
Natassha McDonald	400 m	53.15	9	Did not advance	
Maïté Bouchard	800 m	DNF		Did not advance	
Lindsey Butterworth	800 m	2:03.82	4 q	2:02.68	5
Jessica O'Connell	5000 m	—N/a		15:36.08	2nd place, silver medalist(s)
Andrea Seccafien	5000 m	—N/a		Did not start	
Rachel Cliff	10,000 m	—N/a		32:13.34	3rd place, bronze medalist(s)
Natasha Wodak	10,000 m	—N/a		31:55.17 GR	1st place, gold medalist(s)
Keira Christie-Galloway	100 m hurdles	13.57	12	Did not advance	
Phylicia George	100 m hurdles	Did not start			
Sage Watson	400 m hurdles	56.37	7 Q	55.16 SB	1st place, gold medalist(s)
Geneviève Lalonde	3000 m steeplechase	—N/a		9:41.45 GR	1st place, gold medalist(s)
Regan Yee	3000 m steeplechase	—N/a		10:00.08	5
Ashlan Best; Khamica Bingham; Leya Buchanan; Crystal Emmanuel	4 × 100 m relay	—N/a		43.37	2nd place, silver medalist(s)
Kyra Constantine; Natassha McDonald; Aiyanna Stiverne; Sage Watson	4 × 400 m relay	—N/a		3:27.01	2nd place, silver medalist(s)

Field events

Athlete	Event	Final	
Athlete	Event	Distance	Position
Christabel Nettey	Long jump	5.96	14
Kelsie Ahbe	Pole vault	4.35	6
Alysha Newman	Pole vault	4.55	3rd place, bronze medalist(s)
Brittany Crew	Shot put	19.07 PB	2nd place, silver medalist(s)
Sarah Mitton	Shot put	17.62	6
Camryn Rogers	Hammer throw	66.09	6
Jillian Weir	Hammer throw	65.41	8
Liz Gleadle	Javelin throw	63.30	2nd place, silver medalist(s)

== Badminton ==
Canada qualified a full team of eight badminton athletes. The team was officially named on June 12, 2019.

Singles

Athlete	Event	Round of 64	Round of 32	Round of 16	Quarterfinals	Semifinals	Final	Rank
Athlete	Event	Opposition Result	Opposition Result	Opposition Result	Opposition Result	Opposition Result	Opposition Result	Rank
Jason Ho-Shue	Men's	Bye	Cabrera (DOM); W 2–0 (21-5, 21–9)	Farias (BRA); W 2–0 (21-12, 21–9)	Muñoz (MEX); W 2–0 (21-14, 21–15)	Coelho (BRA); L 1–2 (22-20, 20–22, 21–8)	Did not advance	3rd place, bronze medalist(s)
Brian Yang	Men's	Bye	Shu (USA); W 2–1 (18-21, 21–11, 21–6)	López (MEX); W 2–0 (21-11, 21–10)	Guerrero (CUB); W 2–1 (21-10, 15–21, 21–13)	Cordón (GUA); W 2–1 (15-21, 21–13, 13–3^{r})	Coelho (BRA); L 0–2 (19-21, 10–21)	2nd place, silver medalist(s)
Rachel Honderich	Women's	Bye	Lima (BRA); W 2–0 (21-14, 21–11)	Jiménez (DOM); W 2–0 (21-11, 21–10)	Oropeza (CUB); W 2–0 (21-13, 21–10)	Sotomayor (GUA); W 2–0 (21-8, 21–10)	Li (CAN); L 0–2 (11-21, 19–21)	2nd place, silver medalist(s)
Michelle Li	Women's	Bye	Polanco (DOM); W 2–0 (21-17, 21–12)	Villalobos (CRC); W 2–0 (21-7, 21–13)	Gaitan (MEX); W 2–0 (21-9, 26–24)	Wang (USA); W 2–0 (21-10, 21–5)	Honderich (CAN); W 2–0 (21-11, 21–19)	1st place, gold medalist(s)

Doubles

Athlete	Event	Round of 32	Round of 16	Quarterfinals	Semifinals	Final	Rank
Athlete	Event	Opposition Result	Opposition Result	Opposition Result	Opposition Result	Opposition Result	Rank
Jason Ho-Shue; Nyl Yakura	Men's	—N/a	Bye	Cuba (PER); Mini (PER); W 2–0 (21-13, 21–10)	Guerrero (CUB); Martínez (CUB); W 2–0 (23-21, 21–15)	Chew (USA); Chew (USA); W 2–0 (21-11, 19–21, 21–18)	1st place, gold medalist(s)
Rachel Honderich; Kristen Tsai	Women's	—N/a	Bye	Castillo (PER) la Torre Regal (PER); W 2–0 (21-3, 21–3)	Santos (BRA); Silva (BRA); W 2–0 (21-5, 21–8)	Chen (USA); Hsu (USA); W 2–0 (21-10, 21–9)	1st place, gold medalist(s)
Joshua Hurlburt-Yu; Josephine Wu	Mixed	Bye	Baque (ECU); Zambrano (ECU); W 2–0 (21-9, 21–8)	Muñoz (MEX); Gaitan (MEX); W 2–0 (21-16, 21–19)	Farias (BRA); Lima (BRA); W 2–1 (20-22, 21–17, 21–13)	Yakura (CAN); Tsai (CAN); W 2–1 (18-21, 21–12, 21–15)	1st place, gold medalist(s)
Nyl Yakura; Kristen Tsai	Mixed	Bye	Pomoceno (BRA); Silva (BRA); W 2–0 (21-11, 21–10)	Guerrero (CUB); Oropeza (CUB); W 2–0 (21-10, 21–14)	Shu (USA); Obañana (USA); W 2–0 (21-15, 21–15)	Hurlburt-Yu (CAN); Wu (CAN); L 1–2 (21-18, 12–21, 15–21)	2nd place, silver medalist(s)

== Baseball ==
Canada qualified a men's team of 24 athletes by finishing in the top four at the 2019 Pan American Games Qualifier in Brazil.

Roster

Canada's roster of 24 athletes was officially named on June 25, 2019.

- Ben Abram (P)
- Phillippe Aumont (P)
- Jordan Balazovic (P)
- Eric Cerantola (P)
- Michael Crouse (OF)
- Wes Darvill (INF)
- RJ Freure (P)
- Tyson Gillies (OF)
- Dustin Houle (C)
- Edouard Julien (INF)
- Ryan Kellogg (P)
- Jordan Lennerton (INF)
- Chris Leroux (P)
- Adam Loewen (P)
- Jonathan Malo (INF)
- Dustin Molleken (P)
- Connor Panas (OF)
- Tristan Pompey (OF
- Jordan Procyshen (C)
- Jasvir Rakkar (P)
- Scott Richmond (P)
- Evan Rutckyj (P)
- Rene Tosoni (OF)
- Eric Wood (INF)

Legend: C = Catcher • INF = Infielder • OF = Outfielder • P = Pitcher

Group B

	GP	W	L	RS	RA	DIFF
Canada	3	3	0	28	9	+19
Colombia	3	2	1	13	13	0
Cuba	3	1	2	17	14	+3
Argentina	3	0	3	2	24	−22

Qualified for the Super round

July 29; 15:05	Argentina	0–10 (F/8)	Canada	Baseball Stadium, Lima; Attendance: 2,355
July 29; 15:05		Boxscore		Baseball Stadium, Lima; Attendance: 2,355

July 30; 19:05	Canada	8–6	Cuba	Baseball Stadium, Lima; Attendance: 1,123
July 30; 19:05		Boxscore		Baseball Stadium, Lima; Attendance: 1,123

August 1; 10:05	Colombia	3–10	Canada	Baseball Stadium, Lima; Attendance: N/A
August 1; 10:05		Boxscore		Baseball Stadium, Lima; Attendance: N/A

Super round

	GP	W	L	RS	RA	DIFF
Puerto Rico	3	3	0	17	9	+8
Canada	3	2	1	25	11	+14
Colombia	3	1	2	15	13	+2
Nicaragua	3	0	3	4	28	−24

August 2; 15:05	Puerto Rico	8–5	Canada	Baseball Stadium, Lima; Attendance: 2,100
August 2; 15:05		Boxscore		Baseball Stadium, Lima; Attendance: 2,100

August 3; 15:05	Nicaragua	0–10 (F/7)	Canada	Baseball Stadium, Lima; Attendance: 1,979
August 3; 15:05		Boxscore		Baseball Stadium, Lima; Attendance: 1,979

Gold medal match

August 4; 18:05	(gold) Puerto Rico	6–1	Canada (silver)	Baseball Stadium, Lima; Attendance: N/A
August 4; 18:05		Boxscore		Baseball Stadium, Lima; Attendance: N/A

== Basketball ==
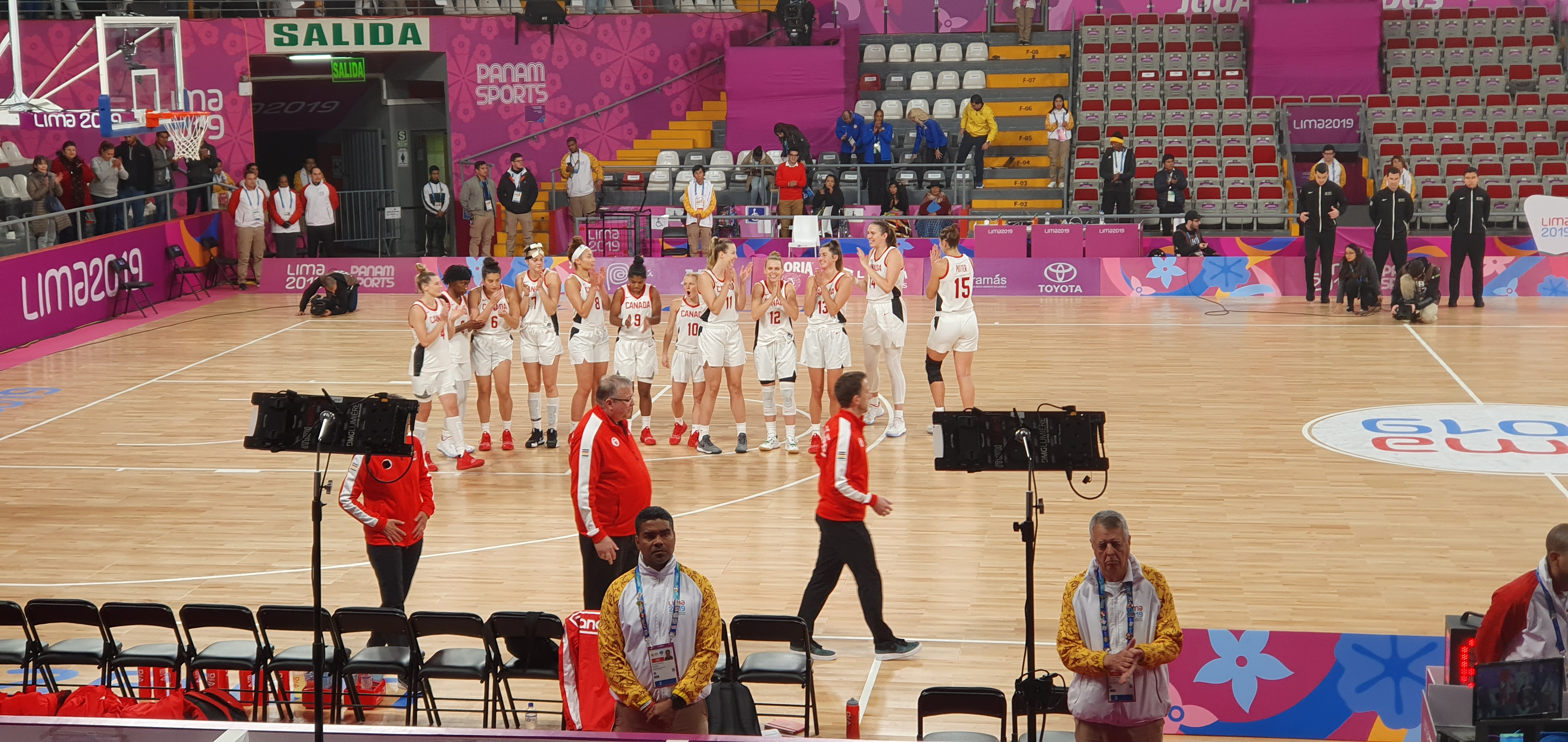
Canada women's national basketball team at the 2019 Pan American Games.

Canada qualified a women's team (of 12 athletes) by winning the 2017 FIBA Women's AmeriCup. The team entered was a developmental team, using this event to gain international experience.

=== Women's tournament ===
Roster

Canada's roster of 12 athletes was officially named on June 28, 2019.

- Hailey Brown (F)
- Cassandra Brown (F)
- Hanna Hall (G)
- Ruth Hamblin (C)
- Samantha Hill (G)
- Alyssa Jerome (F)
- Alex Kiss-Rusk (C)
- Aislinn Konig (G)
- Ceejay Nofuente (G)
- Shaina Pellington (G)
- Emily Potter (C)
- Jamie Scott (G)

Legend: C = Centre • F = Forward • G = Guard

Group A

Team	Pld	W	L	PF	PA	PD	Pts	Qualification
Brazil	3	3	0	224	166	+58	6	Qualified for the Semifinals
Puerto Rico	3	2	1	221	200	+21	5	Qualified for the Semifinals
Canada	3	1	2	224	215	+9	4	
Paraguay	3	0	3	174	262	−88	3	

6 August 2019
13:30

Report

Canada	71–79	Brazil
Scoring by quarter: 21–24, 19–16, 12–19, 19–20
Pts: Pellington 21; Rebs: Hamblin 10; Asts: Pellington, Scott 3		Pts: Dos Santos 15; Rebs: Dos Santos 11; Asts: three players 3

Coliseo Eduardo Dibos, Lima
Referees: Steven Anderson (USA)

7 August 2019
10:30

Report

Paraguay	64–90	Canada
Scoring by quarter: 17–22, 18–19, 13–23, 16–26
Pts: Ferrari 28; Rebs: Ferrari, Caraves 5 Asts: Peralta 3		Pts: Hill 14; Rebs: Hamblin 10; Asts: Pellington 3

Coliseo Eduardo Dibos, Lima
Referees: Steven Anderson (USA)

8 August 2019
21:00

Report

Canada	63–72	Puerto Rico
Scoring by quarter: 17–26, 11–14, 17–12, 18–20
Pts: Scott 16; Rebs: Jerome 7 Asts: Pellington, Jerome 2		Pts: Gwathmey 22; Rebs: Gibson 7 Asts: O'Neill, Gwathmey 4

Coliseo Eduardo Dibos, Lima
Referees: Leonardo Zalazar (ARG)

Fifth place match

9 August 2019
13:30

Report

Canada	54–59	Argentina
Scoring by quarter: 9–17, 14–8, 8–20, 23–14
Pts: Pellington 18; Rebs: Hamblin 12; Asts: Scott 2		Pts: Boquete 18; Rebs: Burani, Santana 9 Asts: Gretter 11

Coliseo Eduardo Dibos, Lima
Referees: Cristiano Maranho (BRA)

== Bowling ==
Canada qualified two women by finishing in the top two at the 2018 PABCON Female Championship. Canada later qualified two men by finishing among the top five at the PABCON Champion of Champions. The four member team was officially announced on April 9, 2019.

Singles

Athlete	Event	Qualification															Round robin		Quarterfinals	Semifinals	Finals	
Athlete	Event	Block 1 (Games 1–6)						Block 2 (Games 7–12)						Total	Average	Rank	Round robin		Quarterfinals	Semifinals	Finals	
Athlete	Event	1	2	3	4	5	6	7	8	9	10	11	12	Total	Average	Rank	Score	Rank	Opposition Scores	Opposition Scores	Opposition Scores	Rank
François Lavoie	Men's	216	236	223	277	232	226	238	189	229	184	220	186	2656	221.3	=9	Did not advance					
Dan MacLelland	Men's	235	245	266	193	290	257	223	236	300	192	198	212	2847	237.3	3 Q	1594	7	Did not advance			
Valerie Bercier	Women's	181	221	205	216	210	189	196	215	208	192	257	177	2467	205.6	12	Did not advance					
Miranda Panas	Women's	205	181	234	222	173	215	212	207	154	198	191	188	2380	198.3	17	Did not advance					

Doubles

Athlete	Event	Block 1 (Games 1–6)						Block 2 (Games 7–12)								Grand total	Final rank
Athlete	Event	1	2	3	4	5	6	7	8	9	10	11	12	Total	Average	Grand total	Final rank
François Lavoie; Dan MacLelland	Men's	278	215	214	243	148	213	279	268	258	171	232	234	2753	229.4	5352	4
François Lavoie; Dan MacLelland	Men's	237	161	228	245	233	200	279	197	190	217	231	181	2599	216.6	5352	4
Valerie Bercier; Miranda Panas	Women's	200	186	216	204	233	204	279	191	192	186	278	183	2552	212.7	4768	8
Valerie Bercier; Miranda Panas	Women's	184	168	200	176	179	155	235	176	176	195	161	211	2216	184.7	4768	8

== Boxing ==
Canada qualified six boxers (two men and four women). The official team was announced on May 15, 2019.

Athlete	Event	Quarterfinals	Semifinals	Final	Rank
Athlete	Event	Opposition Result	Opposition Result	Opposition Result	Rank
Harley-David O'Reilly	Men's 81 kg	Marley Machado (BRA); L 0–5	Did not advance		
Bryan Colwell	Men's 91 kg	Erislandy Savón (CUB); L 0–5	Did not advance		
Sabrina Aubin	Women's 57 kg	Marcela Casteneda (COL); L 2–3	Did not advance		
Irene Fiolek	Women's 60 kg	Dayana Sanchez (ARG); L 2–3	Did not advance		
Myriam Da Silva	Women's 69 kg	Bye	Brianda Cruz (MEX); W 4–1	Oshae Jones (USA); L 0–5	2nd place, silver medalist(s)
Tammara Thibeault	Women's 75 kg	Zulena Alvarez (GUA); W RSC	Jessica Caicedo (COL); L 2–3	Did not advance	2nd place, silver medalist(s)

- Tammara Thiebault was upgraded to a silver medal (from bronze) in November 2020 after the doping disqualification of the gold medallist.

== Canoeing ==
=== Slalom ===
Canada qualified a total of four slalom athletes (two men and two women). The team was officially named on June 27, 2019, the team was considered as developmental team.

Slalom

Athlete	Event	Preliminary						Semifinal		Final	
Athlete	Event	Run 1	Rank	Run 2	Rank	Best	Rank	Time	Rank	Time	Rank
Liam Smedley	Men's C-1	91.91	4	94.72	5	91.91	4 Q	96.22	4 Q	97.28	4
Keenan Simpson	Men's K-1	88.17	5	85.57	4	85.57	5 Q	95.10	5 Q	88.45	3rd place, bronze medalist(s)
Lois Betteridge	Women's C-1	97.76	2	100.88	3	97.76	3 Q	105.82	2 Q	102.95	2nd place, silver medalist(s)
Olivia Norman	Women's K-1	103.50	5	108.87	6	103.50	5 Q	112.19	3 Q	114.59	4

Extreme

Athlete	Event	Heats	Semifinal	Final
Keenan Simpson	Men's K-1	2 Q	2 Q	3rd place, bronze medalist(s)
Lois Betteridge	Women's K-1	1 Q	3	Did not advance

=== Sprint ===
Canada qualified a full team of 16 athletes in canoe sprint (eight per gender). However, the official team only had 14 athletes (seven men and seven women). The team was officially named on June 27, 2019, the team was considered as developmental team.

Men

Athlete	Event	Heats		Semifinal		Final	
Athlete	Event	Time	Rank	Time	Rank	Time	Rank
Drew Hodges	C-1 1000 metres	4.13.796	2 F	Bye		3:58.454	3rd place, bronze medalist(s)
Craig Spence; Drew Hodges	C-2 1000 metres	—N/a				3:35.646	2nd place, silver medalist(s)
Dominik Crête	K-1 200 metres	35.470	2 F	Bye		35.456	1st place, gold medalist(s)
Marshall Hughes	K-1 1000 metres	3.35.877	1 F	Bye		3:35.907	2nd place, silver medalist(s)
Jarret Kenke; Jacob Steele	K-2 1000 metres	3:20.201	1 F	Bye		3:17.144	2nd place, silver medalist(s)
Jarret Kenke; Eric Ellery; Dominik Crête; Marshall Hughes	K-4 500 metres	—N/a				3:35.646	4

Women

Athlete	Event	Heats		Semifinal		Final	
Athlete	Event	Time	Rank	Time	Rank	Time	Rank
Anna Roy-Cyr	C-1 200 metres	47.589	3 SF	46.560	1	48.294	5
Anne Lavoie-Parent; Rowan Hardy-Kavanagh	C-2 500 metres	—N/a				2:02.216	3rd place, bronze medalist(s)
Andréanne Langlois	K-1 200 metres	40.714	1 F	Bye		43.406	2nd place, silver medalist(s)
Andréanne Langlois	K-1 500 metres	1.54.528	1 F	Bye		1:53.332	2nd place, silver medalist(s)
Andréanne Langlois; Alanna Bray-Lougheed	K-2 500 metres	1:46.470	1 F	Bye		1:45.484	1st place, gold medalist(s)
Andréanne Langlois; Alanna Bray-Lougheed; Alexa Irvin; Anna Negulic	K-4 500 metres	—N/a				1:34.316	1st place, gold medalist(s)

Qualification Legend: F = Qualify to final (medal); SF = Qualify to semifinal. Position is within the heat

== Cycling ==
Canada qualified 12 cyclists (four men and eight women). The defending champion in both events, Canada, decided not to compete in mountain biking after the Pan American Championships date was changed at the last minute. After a highly successful games in 2015 on home soil, where Canada topped the cycling medal table with 20 medals, Cycling Canada decided to shift its focus to the next generation of athletes and named a team of developmental athletes. Canada originally qualified 21 cyclists, but only 13 were named to the team, later dropping to 12 after BMX racer Alex Tougas withdrew. The team was officially named on June 26, 2019.

=== Road ===
All road athletes will also compete in track cycling.

Women

Athlete	Event	Final	
Athlete	Event	Time	Rank
Erin Attwell	Road race	2:23:07	33
Miriam Brouwer	Road race	2:19:54	19
Maggie Coles-Lyster	Road race	2:20:35	28
Miriam Brouwer	Time trial	26:34.41	5
Laurie Jussaume	Time trial	26:27.15	3rd place, bronze medalist(s)

=== Track cycling ===
Sprint

Athlete	Event	Qualification		Round of 16	Repechage 1	Quarterfinals	Semifinals	Final	
Athlete	Event	Time	Rank	Opposition Time	Opposition Time	Opposition Result	Opposition Result	Opposition Result	Rank
Nick Wammes	Men's	10.100	3 Q	Bottasso (COL); L 10.910	Fonseca (BRA), Sánchez (VEN); L 10.875	Did not advance			
Joël Archambault	Men's	10.380	12 Q	Paul (TTO); L 10.482	Morales (COL), Estrada (GUA); L 10.635	Did not advance			
Kelsey Mitchell	Women's	10.890 PR	1º Q	Tarira (ECU); W 11.755	—N/a	Hacohen (GUA); W 11.485, W 11.795	Valles (MEX); W 11.526, W 11.330	Bayona (COL); W 11.415, W 11.449	1st place, gold medalist(s)
Amelia Walsh	Women's	11.453	6 Q	Hacohen (GUA); W 11.910	—N/a	González (MEX); L 11.654, L 11.778	—N/a	Guerra (CUB); Hacohen (GUA); Gaviria (COL); L	7
Kelsey Mitchell; Amelia Walsh	Women's team	34.189	2 Q	—N/a				Valles (MEX); González (MEX); L	2nd place, silver medalist(s)

Keirin

Athlete	Event	Heats	Repechage	Final
Athlete	Event	Rank	Rank	Rank
Joël Archambault	Men's	5 R	5 FB	7
Kelsie Mitchell	Women's	1 FA	—N/a	5

Madison

Athlete	Event	Points	Rank
Miriam Brouwer; Maggie Coles-Lyster	Women's	35	2nd place, silver medalist(s)

Pursuit

Athlete	Event	Qualification		Semifinals	Finals	
Athlete	Event	Time	Rank	Opposition Result	Opposition Result	Rank
Erin Attwell; Miriam Brouwer; Maggie Coles-Lyster; Laurie Jussaume	Women's team	4:29.145	2 Q	Mexico; W 4:29.145	United States; L 4:27.799	2nd place, silver medalist(s)

Omnium

Athlete	Event	Scratch race		Tempo race		Elimination race		Points race		Total	
Athlete	Event	Rank	Points	Points	Rank	Rank	Points	Points	Rank	Points	Rank
Maggie Coles-Lyster	Women's	5	32	28	7	6	30	5	7	95	7

=== BMX ===
Freestyle

Athlete	Event	Seeding				Final			
Athlete	Event	Run 1	Run 2	Score	Rank	Run 1	Run 2	Score	Rank
Jaden Chipman	Men's	73.33	80.67	77.00	6 Q	42.67	71.33	71.33	7

Racing

Athlete	Event	Seeding		Quarterfinal		Semifinal		Final	
Athlete	Event	Result	Rank	Points	Rank	Points	Rank	Time	Rank
James Palmer	Men's	33.618	5 Q	3	1 Q	12	4 Q	33.389	5
Drew Mechielsen	Women's	38.849	5 Q	—N/a		14	4 Q	39.054	7
Daina Tuchscherer	Women's	40.136	8 Q	—N/a		10	3 Q	39.601	8

== Diving ==
Canada qualified a full team of eight divers (four per gender). The team was officially announced on June 12, 2019.

Men

Athlete	Event	Preliminary		Final	
Athlete	Event	Points	Rank	Points	Rank
François Imbeau-Dulac	Men's 3m Springboard	365.15	14	Did not advance	
Philippe Gagné	Men's 3m Springboard	444.95	1	448.65	3rd place, bronze medalist(s)
Vincent Riendeau	Men's 10m Platform	424.85	4 Q	462.70	3rd place, bronze medalist(s)
Nathan Zsombor-Murray	Men's 10m Platform	422.35	5 Q	433.00	6
Philippe Gagné; François Imbeau-Dulac	Men's 3m Synchro	—N/a		414.21	2nd place, silver medalist(s)
Vincent Riendeau; Nathan Zsombor-Murray	Men's 10m Synchro Platform	—N/a		396.12	2nd place, silver medalist(s)

Women

Athlete	Event	Preliminary		Final	
Athlete	Event	Points	Rank	Points	Rank
Jennifer Abel	Women's 3m Springboard	352.35	1 Q	374.25	1st place, gold medalist(s)
Pamela Ware	Women's 3m Springboard	318.60	2 Q	330.60	4
Meaghan Benfeito	Women's 10m Platform	321.05	5 Q	375.05	1st place, gold medalist(s)
Caeli McKay	Women's 10m Platform	340.70	2 Q	365.70	2nd place, silver medalist(s)
Jennifer Abel; Pamela Ware	Women's 3m Synchro	—N/a		309.60	1st place, gold medalist(s)
Meaghan Benfeito; Caeli McKay	Women's 10m Synchro Platform	—N/a		320.64	1st place, gold medalist(s)

== Equestrian ==
Canada qualified a full team of 12 equestrians (four per discipline). The team of 12 athletes (two men and ten women) was named on June 19, 2019.

=== Dressage ===
Athlete	Horse	Event	Qualification						Grand Prix Freestyle / Intermediate I Freestyle	
Athlete	Horse	Event	Grand Prix / Prix St. Georges		Grand Prix Special / Intermediate I		Total		Grand Prix Freestyle / Intermediate I Freestyle	
Athlete	Horse	Event	Score	Rank	Score	Rank	Score	Rank	Score	Rank
Jill Irving	Degas	Individual	68.391	12	67.851	12	136.242	11	Did not advance	
Tina Irwin	Laurencio	Individual	73.735	2	73.853	2	147.588	2 Q	77.780	2nd place, silver medalist(s)
Lindsay Kellock	Floratina	Individual	73.176	3	73.147	3	146.323	3 Q	73.550	7
Naïma Moreira-Laliberté	Statesman	Individual	71.413	6	71.787	4	143.200	4 Q	73.565	6
Jill Irving; Tina Irwin; Lindsay Kellock; Naïma Moreira-Laliberté	As above	Team	219.824	2	220.287	1	440.111	1st place, gold medalist(s)	—N/a	

=== Eventing ===
Athlete	Horse	Event	Dressage		Cross-country		Jumping		Total	
Athlete	Horse	Event	Points	Rank	Points	Rank	Points	Rank	Points	Rank
Dana Cooke	Mississippi	Individual	32.80	13	77.60	23	Withdrew		Did not advance	
Colleen Loach	Golden Eye	Individual	26.20	4	61.60	22	0.00	1	87.80	20
Jessica Phoenix	Pavarotti	Individual	27.40	5	9.60	6	0.00	1	37.00	5
Karl Slezak	Fernhill Wishes	Individual	27.70	6	31.20	15	0.00	1	58.90	12
Dana Cooke; Colleen Loach; Jessica Phoenix; Karl Slezak	As above	Team	81.30	2	102.40	3	0.00	1	183.70	3rd place, bronze medalist(s)

=== Jumping ===
Athlete	Horse	Event	Qualification								Final					
Athlete	Horse	Event	Round 1		Round 2		Round 3		Total		Round A		Round B		Total	
Athlete	Horse	Event	Faults	Rank	Faults	Rank	Faults	Rank	Faults	Rank	Faults	Rank	Faults	Rank	Faults	Rank
Erynn Ballard	Fellini S	Individual	3.26	15	0	1	0	1	3.26	2 Q	8	13	4	12	12	8
Lisa Carlsen	Parette	Individual	43.24	48	8	15	8	16	59.24	38	Did not advance					
Mario Deslauriers	Amsterdam	Individual	1.57	10	16	33	4	9	21.57	19 Q	8	14	5	14	13	15
Nicole Walker	Falco van Spieveld	Individual	1.38	9	8	15	4	9	13.38	12 Q	4	6	0	2	4	4 (lost jump-off)
Erynn Ballard; Lisa Carlsen; Mario Deslauriers; Nicole Walker	As above	Team	6.21	3	16	4	8	2	30.21	4	—N/a					

== Fencing ==
Canada qualified a full team of 18 fencers (nine men and nine women). The team was announced officially on June 7, 2019.

Individual
Men

Athlete	Event	Pool Round		Round of 16	Quarterfinals	Semifinals	Final	
Athlete	Event	Victories	Seed	Opposition Score	Opposition Score	Opposition Score	Opposition Score	Rank
Marc-Antoine Blais Bélanger	Épée	3	7 Q	Henrique (CUB); W 15–11	Reytor (CUB); L 10–15	Did not advance		
Seraphim Hsieh Jarov	Épée	1	16	Did not advance				
Eli Schenkel	Foil	4	6 Q	Cervantes (MEX); W 15–6	Imboden (USA); L 5–15	Did not advance		
Maximilien Van Haaster	Foil	4	4 Q	Clairet (COL); W 15–11	Padua (PUR); W 15–11	Meinhardt (USA); L 7–15	Did not advance	3rd place, bronze medalist(s)
Shaul Gordon	Sabre	3	10 Q	Pekelman (BRA); W 15–10	Ayala (MEX); W 15–5	Homer (USA); L 14–15	Did not advance	3rd place, bronze medalist(s)
Joseph Polossifakis	Sabre	4	4 Q	Di Tella (ARG); L 12–15	Did not advance			

Women

Athlete	Event	Pool Round		Round of 16	Quarterfinals	Semifinals	Final	
Athlete	Event	Victories	Seed	Opposition Score	Opposition Score	Opposition Score	Opposition Score	Rank
Leonora Mackinnon	Épée	3	10 Q	Rodriguez (CUB); L 14–15	Did not advance			
Malinka Hoppe	Épée	3	6 Q	Mendoza (CUB); L 9–15	Did not advance			
Jessica Guo	Foil	5	3 Q	Hernández (MEX); W 15–5	Cecchini (BRA); W 15–6	Harvey (CAN); W 14–12	Kiefer (USA); L 10–15	2nd place, silver medalist(s)
Eleanor Harvey	Foil	5	2 Q	Bye	Acurero (VEN); W 15–5	Guo (CAN); L 12–14	Did not advance	3rd place, bronze medalist(s)
Gabriella Page	Sabre	4	3 Q	Ponich (CAN); W 15–9	Grench (PAN); W 15–13	Stone (USA); L 10–15	Did not advance	3rd place, bronze medalist(s)
Marissa Ponich	Sabre	2	14 Q	Page (CAN); L 9–15	Did not advance			

Team

Athlete	Event	Quarterfinals	Semifinals/Consolation	Final / BM / PM	
Athlete	Event	Opposition Score	Opposition Score	Opposition Score	Rank
Marc-Antoine Blais-Bélanger; Seraphim Hsieh Jarov; John Wright; Shaul Gordon	Men's épée	Argentina; L 23–45	Mexico; L 39–45	Peru; W 45–35	7
Eli Schenkel; Maximilien Van Haaster; Mikhail Sweet; Seraphim Hsieh Jarov	Men's foil	Peru; W 45–38	Brazil; L 43–45	Colombia; W 45–29	3rd place, bronze medalist(s)
Shaul Gordon; Joseph Polossifakis; Fares Arfa; Eli Schenkel	Men's sabre	Peru; W 45–18	Colombia; W 45–34	United States; L 41–45	2nd place, silver medalist(s)
Leonora Mackinnon; Malinka Hoppe; Alexanne Verret; Gabriella Page	Women's épée	Cuba; L 40–45	Mexico; L 42–43	Peru; W 45–28	7
Jessica Guo; Eleanor Harvey; Alanna Goldie; Gabriella Page	Women's foil	Peru; W 45–16	Mexico; W 44–27	United States; L 39–45	2nd place, silver medalist(s)
Gabriella Page; Marissa Ponich; Pamela Brind'Amour; Eleanor Harvey	Women's sabre	Argentina; W 45–33	Dominican Republic; L 42–45	Mexico; W 45–38	3rd place, bronze medalist(s)

- Fencers listed in italics were the substitute.

== Field hockey ==
Canada qualified a men's and women's team (of 16 athletes each, for a total of 32) by being ranked among the top three unqualified nations from the 2017 Men's Pan American Cup and 2017 Women's Pan American Cup respectively.

=== Men's tournament ===
Roster

Canada announced their squad on 17 June 2019.

Head coach: Paul Bundy

No.	Pos.	Player	Date of birth (age)	Caps	Club
3	DF	Brandon Pereira	30 April 1996 (aged 23)	54	(Canada) United Brothers
4	DF	Scott Tupper (Captain)	16 December 1986 (aged 32)	300	(Canada) West Vancouver
8	FW	Oliver Scholfield	11 September 1993 (aged 25)	57	(Canada) Vancouver Hawks
10	FW	Keegan Pereira	8 September 1991 (aged 27)	167	(Germany) Uhlenhorst Mülheim
11	DF	Balraj Panesar	16 March 1996 (aged 23)	64	(Canada) UBC Thunderbirds
14	MF	Adam Froese	13 August 1991 (aged 27)	183	(Canada) India Club
16	DF	Gordon Johnston	30 January 1993 (aged 26)	165	(Canada) Vancouver Hawks
17	MF	Brenden Bissett	28 January 1993 (aged 26)	124	(Canada) Vancouver Hawks
18	FW	James Wallace	14 September 1999 (aged 19)	35	(Canada) UBC Thunderbirds
19	FW	Matthew Pearson	18 June 1987 (aged 32)	268	(Canada) West Vancouver
22	DF	John Smythe	31 August 1989 (aged 29)	106	(Canada) Vancouver Hawks
23	FW	Iain Smythe	2 June 1985 (aged 34)	195	(Canada) Vancouver Hawks
24	MF	James Kirkpatrick	29 March 1991 (aged 28)	85	(Canada) West Vancouver
27	MF	Sukhi Panesar	26 December 1993 (aged 25)	137	(Canada) United Brothers
29	MF	Taylor Curran	19 May 1992 (aged 27)	173	(Canada) West Vancouver
30	GK	David Carter	4 November 1981 (aged 37)	187	(Canada) United Brothers

Preliminary round

Pos	Team	Pld	W	D	L	GF	GA	GD	Pts	Qualification
1	Canada	3	3	0	0	23	2	+21	9	Quarter-finals
2	United States	3	2	0	1	21	5	+16	6	Quarter-finals
3	Mexico	3	1	0	2	10	12	−2	3	Quarter-finals
4	Peru (H)	3	0	0	3	3	38	−35	0	Quarter-finals

Source: FIH
(H) Hosts

30 July 2019
14:00

Canada	5–1	Mexico
Scholfield 7', 39'; Pearson 28', 30'; Pereira 54'	Report	Aguilar 34'

Umpires:
Frederico Silva (ARG)
Hugo Romero (PAR)

1 August 2019
12:00

United States	0–4	Canada
	Report	Johnston 5', 11'; Pearson 18'; Kirkpatrick 38'

Umpires:
Peter Wright (RSA)
Federico Silva (ARG)

3 August 2019
16:00

Canada	14–1	Peru
I. Smythe 3'; Johnston 4'; Wallace 4', 36'; Tupper 14', 57'; Panesar 22'; Pereira 26', 55'; Scholfield 27', 41', 44'; Pearson 33', 42'	Report	Diaz Espinosa 8'

Umpires:
Deepak Joshi (IND)
Federico Silva (ARG)

Quarterfinals

5 August 2019
20:15

Trinidad and Tobago	1–5	Canada
Browne 6'	Report	I. Smythe 2'; Pearson 10'; Bissett 47'; Tupper 49', 56'

Umpires:
Deepak Joshi (IND)
Gus Soteriades (USA)

Semifinals

8 August 2019
17:15

Chile	2–3	Canada
Rodriguez 23', 54'	Report	Tupper 19', 55'; Johnston 43'

Umpires:
Deepak Joshi (IND)
Gus Soteriades (USA)

Gold medal match

10 August 2019
17:15

(gold) Argentina	5–2	Canada (silver)
Tolini 17', 19'; Ferreiro 27'; Casella 40'; Martínez 53'	Report	Tupper 16'; Johnston 60'

Umpires:
Peter Wright (RSA)
Gus Soteriades (USA)

=== Women's tournament ===
Roster

The following 16 players were named in the Canada squad.

Head Coach: Giles Bonnet

No.	Pos.	Player	Date of birth (age)	Caps	Club
1	GK	Kaitlyn Williams	15 August 1989 (aged 29)	137	(Argentina) CASI
8	DF	Elise Wong	21 January 1998 (age 28)	13	(United States) Princeton University
9	DF	Danielle Hennig	23 December 1990 (age 35)	188	(Belgium) Royal Victory
14	DF	Karli Johansen	26 March 1992 (age 34)	133	(Belgium) Royal Léopold
17	DF	Sara McManus	14 August 1993 (age 33)	175	(Belgium) KHC Leuven
25	DF	Shanlee Johnston	5 February 1990 (age 36)	115	(Belgium) Gantoise
6	MF	Anna Mollenhauer	18 September 1999 (age 27)	14	(Canada) University of Victoria
16	MF	Natalie Sourisseau	5 December 1992 (age 33)	141	(Netherlands) THC Hurley
21	MF	Amanda Woodcroft	9 October 1993 (age 33)	115	(Belgium) KHC Leuven
22	MF	Madeline Secco	15 March 1994 (age 32)	127	(Belgium) Royal Victory
3	FW	Katherine Wright (C)	14 August 1989 (age 37)	216	(Belgium) KHC Leuven
11	FW	Rachel Donohoe	17 October 1994 (age 32)	76	(Belgium) Gantoise
13	FW	Hannah Haughn	4 September 1994 (age 32)	179	(Belgium) Royal Victory
19	FW	Holly Stewart	18 May 1993 (age 33)	92	(Belgium) Hockey Namur
23	FW	Brienne Stairs	22 December 1989 (age 36)	163	(Belgium) KHC Leuven
26	FW	Stephanie Norlander	20 December 1995 (age 30)	114	(Belgium) KHC Leuven

Preliminary round

Pos	Team	Pld	W	D	L	GF	GA	GD	Pts	Qualification
1	Argentina	3	3	0	0	18	1	+17	9	Quarter-finals
2	Canada	3	2	0	1	15	3	+12	6	Quarter-finals
3	Uruguay	3	1	0	2	8	8	0	3	Quarter-finals
4	Cuba	3	0	0	3	2	31	−29	0	Quarter-finals

Source: FIH

29 July 2019
12:00

Canada	10–0	Cuba
Stairs 2', 19', 51'; McManus 11', 23'; Norlander 13', 54'; Secco 21'; Haughn 46'; Stewart 56'	Report

Umpires:
Liu Xiaoying (CHN)
Victoria Pazos (PAR)

31 July 2019
16:00

Canada	0–3	Argentina
	Report	D'Elía 5'; Rebecchi 34'; Barrionuevo 56'

Umpires:
Lix Xiaoying (CHN)
Ayanna McClean (TTO)

2 August 2019
10:00

Uruguay	0–5	Canada
	Report	Norlander 4'; Donohoe 10'; McManus 38', 43'; Stewart 51'

Umpires:
Mary Driscoll (USA)
Maria Locatelli (ARG)

Quarterfinals

4 August 2019
11:45

Canada	9–0	Mexico
Johansen 6', 41'; Donohoe 11'; Sourisseau 25', 33'; Woodcroft 28'; McManus 31'; Stairs 44'; Haughn 52'	Report

Umpires:
Catilina Montesino (CHI)
Natalia Lodeiro (URU)

Semifinals

6 August 2019
17:15

Canada	2–0	United States
Johansen 10'; Secco 35'	Report

Umpires:
Amber Church (NZL)
Victoria Pazos (PAR)

Gold medal match

9 August 2019
17:15

(gold) Argentina	5–1	Canada (silver)
Jankunas 9', 47'; D'Elía 22', 45'; Rebecchi 37'	Report	Wright 32'

Umpires:
Catalina Montesino (CHI)
Mary Driscoll (USA)

== Golf ==
Canada qualified a full team of four golfers (two men and two women). The team was officially announced on May 28, 2019.

Athlete(s)	Event	Final						
Athlete(s)	Event	Round 1	Round 2	Round 3	Round 4	Total	To par	Rank
Austin Connelly	Men's individual	69	71	65	68	273	−11	6
Joey Savoie	Men's individual	70	75	76	73	294	+10	=27
Mary Parsons	Women's individual	68	73	75	70	286	−1	5
Brigitte Thibault	Women's individual	74	73	68	75	290	+6	=9
Austin Connelly; Joey Savoie; Mary Parsons; Brigitte Thibault	Mixed team	137	144	133	138	552	−16	3rd place, bronze medalist(s)

== Gymnastics ==
Canada qualified a full gymnastics team of 21 gymnasts (seven men and 14 women). The team was officially named on June 17, 2019.

=== Artistic ===
Canada qualified a full team of ten gymnasts (five men and five women).

Men
Team & Individual Qualification

Athlete	Event	Apparatus						Total	Rank
Athlete	Event	F	PH	R	V	PB	HB	Total	Rank
Zachary Clay	Team		14.500 Q	12.700				27.200	54
René Cournoyer	Team	12.550	13.800	14.000 Q	14.500	13.500	13.550 Q	81.900 Q	3
Justin Karstadt	Team	11.550	13.900 Q	13.350	14.100 Q	13.900	12.150	78.950	9
Cory Paterson	Team	13.600	13.275	13.400	14.050	13.400	13.475	81.200 Q	6
Sam Zakutney	Team	13.500			14.200	12.750	13.500 Q	53.950	42
Total	Team	39.650	42.200	40.750	42.800	40.800	40.525	246.725	3rd place, bronze medalist(s)

Women
Team & Individual Qualification

Athlete	Event	Apparatus				Total	Rank
Athlete	Event	V	UB	BB	F	Total	Rank
Ellie Black	Team	14.550 Q	14.050 Q	12.950 Q	13.550 Q	55.100 Q	3
Brooklyn Moors	Team	12.500	13.100 Q	11.950	13.500 Q	51.050	12
Shallon Olsen	Team	14.150 Q			12.600	—N/a	
Isabela Onyshko	Team		12.950	12.550		—N/a	
Victoria-Kayen Woo	Team	13.550	12.600	12.600	13.100	51.850 Q	9
Total	Team	42.250	40.100	38.100	40.150	160.600	2nd place, silver medalist(s)

Individual finals

Athlete	Event	Apparatus				Total	Rank
Athlete	Event	V	UB	BB	F	Total	Rank
Ellie Black	All-around	14.450	14.300	13.900	12.600	55.250	1st place, gold medalist(s)
Ellie Black	Vault	14.450	—N/a			14.450	1st place, gold medalist(s)
Ellie Black	Uneven bars	—N/a	14.000	—N/a		14.000	3rd place, bronze medalist(s)
Ellie Black	Balance beam	—N/a		13.566	—N/a	13.566	2nd place, silver medalist(s)
Ellie Black	Floor	—N/a			13.433	13.433	4
Brooklyn Moors	Uneven bars	—N/a	13.000	—N/a		13.000	6
Brooklyn Moors	Floor	—N/a			13.900	13.900	1st place, gold medalist(s)
Shallon Olsen	Vault	14.183	—N/a			14.183	3rd place, bronze medalist(s)
Victoria-Kayen Woo	All-around	13.500	12.950	12.550	12.250	51.250	8

=== Rhythmic ===
Canada qualified a full team of seven gymnasts (two individuals and a group of five).

Individual

Athlete	Event	Final					
Athlete	Event	Hoop	Ball	Clubs	Ribbon	Total	Rank
Natalie Garcia	Individual all-around	16.550	16.150	17.250	13.900	63.850	6
Katherine Uchida	Individual all-around	15.950	18.400	17.150	14.700	66.200	5

Individual finals

Athlete	Event	Final	
Athlete	Event	Score	Rank
Natalie Garcia	Ball	15.300	6
Katherine Uchida	Ball	18.150	2nd place, silver medalist(s)
Natalie Garcia	Club	17.650	2nd place, silver medalist(s)
Katherine Uchida	Club	16.350	6
Natalie Garcia	Hoop	16.350	6
Katherine Uchida	Hoop	18.150	2nd place, silver medalist(s)
Katherine Uchida	Ribbon	14.950	6

Group

Athletes	Event	Final			
Athletes	Event	5 balls	3 hoops & 2 clubs	Total	Rank
Carmel Kallemaa; Diana Noskova; Vanessa Panov; Carmen Whelan; Alexandra Zilyuk	Group all-around	19.650	20.650	40.300	5
Carmel Kallemaa; Diana Noskova; Vanessa Panov; Carmen Whelan; Alexandra Zilyuk	Group 5 balls	20.500	—N/a	20.500	5
Carmel Kallemaa; Diana Noskova; Vanessa Panov; Carmen Whelan; Alexandra Zilyuk	Group 3 hoops & 2 clubs	—N/a	13.700	13.700	6

=== Trampoline ===
Canada qualified a full team of four gymnasts in trampoline (two per gender).

Athlete	Event	Qualification		Final	
Athlete	Event	Score	Rank	Score	Rank
Jason Burnett	Men's individual	83.770	10	Did not advance	
Jérémy Chartier	Men's individual	98.100	6 Q	57.440	1st place, gold medalist(s)
Sarah Milette	Women's individual	100.010	1 Q	51.515	5
Samantha Smith	Women's individual	98.905	4 Q	53.735	1st place, gold medalist(s)

== Handball ==
Canada qualified a women's team (of 14 athletes) by winning the final qualification tournament.

=== Women's tournament ===
Roster

Canada's roster of 14 athletes was officially named on June 3, 2019.

- Vassilia Gagnon
- Camilia Pivin
- Alexandra Pivin
- Audrey Marcoux
- Myriam Laplante
- Nassima Benhacine
- Myriam Zimmer
- Émily Routhier
- Catherine Léger
- Samantha Koosau
- Rosali Langlois
- Yuki Landry
- Katya Chan
- Haven Wong

Group A

Pos	Team	Pld	W	D	L	GF	GA	GD	Pts	Qualification
1	Brazil	3	3	0	0	110	48	+62	6	Semifinals
2	Cuba	3	2	0	1	75	68	+7	4	Semifinals
3	Puerto Rico	3	1	0	2	63	76	−13	2	5–8th place semifinals
4	Canada	3	0	0	3	36	92	−56	0	5–8th place semifinals

Source: Lima 2019
Rules for classification: 1) points; 2) head-to-head points; 3) head-to-head goal difference; 4) head-to-head goals scored; 5) goal difference; 6) goals scored; 7) draw.

24 July 2019; 13:00	Puerto Rico	23−9	Canada	Villa Deportiva Nacional; Referees: Paolantoni, García (ARG)
24 July 2019; 13:00	Ceballos 6	(12−4)	three players 2	Villa Deportiva Nacional; Referees: Paolantoni, García (ARG)
24 July 2019; 13:00	1× (yellow card) 1× (suspension)	Report	1× (yellow card) 3× (suspension)	Villa Deportiva Nacional; Referees: Paolantoni, García (ARG)

25 July 2019; 20:30	Canada	12−41	Brazil	Villa Deportiva Nacional; Referees: Pineda, Estrada (COL)
25 July 2019; 20:30	four players 2	(5−20)	Castro 10	Villa Deportiva Nacional; Referees: Pineda, Estrada (COL)
25 July 2019; 20:30	2× (yellow card) 4× (suspension)	Report	1× (yellow card) 1× (suspension)	Villa Deportiva Nacional; Referees: Pineda, Estrada (COL)

27 July 2019; 13:00	Cuba	28–15	Canada	Villa Deportiva Nacional; Referees: Paolantoni, García (ARG)
27 July 2019; 13:00	Rosabal, Téllez 6	(11–7)	Benhacine, Routhier 3	Villa Deportiva Nacional; Referees: Paolantoni, García (ARG)
27 July 2019; 13:00	3× (yellow card) 4× (suspension)	Report	1× (yellow card) 6× (suspension)	Villa Deportiva Nacional; Referees: Paolantoni, García (ARG)

Classification round

29 July 2019; 10:00	Dominican Republic	24–23	Canada	Villa Deportiva Nacional; Referees: Sosa, Lemes (URU)
29 July 2019; 10:00	Brito, Lorenzo 5	(9–14)	Benhacine 8	Villa Deportiva Nacional; Referees: Sosa, Lemes (URU)
29 July 2019; 10:00	2× (yellow card) 4× (suspension) 1× (red card)	Report	2× (yellow card) 3× (suspension)	Villa Deportiva Nacional; Referees: Sosa, Lemes (URU)

Seventh place match

30 July 2019; 10:00	Canada	31–12	Peru	Villa Deportiva Nacional; Referees: Pineda, Estrada (COL)
30 July 2019; 10:00	Routhier 8	(17–6)	Delgado 5	Villa Deportiva Nacional; Referees: Pineda, Estrada (COL)
30 July 2019; 10:00	1× (yellow card) 2× (suspension)	Report	1× (yellow card) 2× (suspension)	Villa Deportiva Nacional; Referees: Pineda, Estrada (COL)

== Judo ==
Canada entered a total of seven judoka into the competition, declining a few quotas earned. The team was officially named on July 12, 2019, and was considered as a developmental team as many of the country's top judoka were not named to the team.

Men

Athlete	Event	Preliminaries	Quarterfinals	Semifinals	Repechage	Final / BM	
Athlete	Event	Opposition Result	Opposition Result	Opposition Result	Opposition Result	Opposition Result	Rank
Jacob Valois	66 kg	Did not start					
Bradley Langlois	73 kg	Metellus (HAI); W 11–00S1	Wong (PER); L 00S3–10	Did not advance	Delpopolo (USA); L 00S3–10	Did not advance	=7
Mohab Elnahas	90 kg	Bye	Macedo (BRA); L 00–10	Did not advance	Peña (VEN); W 10–00H	Florentino (DOM); W 10–00	3rd place, bronze medalist(s)
Marc Deschênes	+100 kg	Nova (DOM); L 00–10S1	Did not advance				

Women

Athlete	Event	Preliminaries	Quarterfinals	Semifinals	Repechage	Final / BM	
Athlete	Event	Opposition Result	Opposition Result	Opposition Result	Opposition Result	Opposition Result	Rank
Marie Besson	52 kg	Bye	Gamarra (PER); L 00–10S1	Did not advance	de Jesús (DOM); L 00S1–10S1	Did not advance	=7
Emily Burt	70 kg	Bye	Cortés (CUB); L 00S3–10S2	Did not advance	Wright (USA); W 10–00S2	Pérez (PUR); L 00–10	=5
Mina Coulombe	78 kg	Brenes (CRC); L 01S3–11S1	Did not advance				

== Karate ==
Canada qualified four karatekas (one man and three women). The team was officially named on June 13, 2019.

Kata
Women

Athlete	Event	Round robin		Final / BM	
Athlete	Event	Points	Rank	Opposition Result	Rank
Ha Thi Ngo	Individual kata	23.82	3 QB	Armada (VEN); L 24.00–24.74	=5

Kumite

Athlete	Event	Round robin				Semifinals	Final	
Athlete	Event	Opposition Result	Opposition Result	Opposition Result	Rank	Opposition Result	Opposition Result	Rank
Daniel Gaysinsky	Men's +84 kg	Castillo (DOM); W 3–0	Irr (USA); D 0–0	Perez (MEX); W 4–1	1 Q	Lenis (COL); W 8–0	Irr (USA); L 0–5	2nd place, silver medalist(s)
Kathryn Campbell	Women's 55 kg	Vindrola (PER); L 4–5	Navarrete (VEN); W 7–6	Torres (CUB); L 0–9	2 Q	Flores (MEX); W 4–1	Kumizaki (BRA); L 1–4	2nd place, silver medalist(s)
Haya Jumaa	Women's 61 kg	Diaz (DOM); D 0–0	Caballero (MEX); L 0–3	Hill (USA); W 5–0	3	Did not advance		

== Modern pentathlon ==
Canada qualified a team of five modern pentathletes (two men and three women). The team was officially named on June 27, 2019.

Individual

Athlete	Event	Fencing (Épée One Touch + Bonus round)			Swimming (200m Freestyle)			Riding (Show Jumping)			Shooting/Running (10 m Air Pistol/3000m)			Total Points	Final Rank
Athlete	Event	Wins	Rank	MP Points	Time	Rank	MP Points	Time	Rank	MP Points	Time	Rank	MP Points	Total Points	Final Rank
Joel Riker-Fox	Men's	12	23	180	2:16.06	22	278	86.84	15	268	11:53.00	21	587	1313	15
Garnett Stevens	Men's	16	17	210	2:08.42	9	294	69.33	2	293	11:29.00	14	611	1408	11
Shauna Biddulph	Women's	12 + 6	21	186	2:59.24	28	192	121.36	16	203	13:52.00	20	468	1049	16
Kelly Fitzsimmons	Women's	19 + 1	11	230	2:23.31	7	264	75.93	2	296	13:47.00	18	473	1263	9
Claire Samulak	Women's	10 + 2	24	168	2:47.81	26	215	72.59	6	292	16:13.00	27	327	1002	19

Relay

Athlete	Event	Fencing (Épée One Touch + Bonus round)			Swimming (200m Freestyle)			Riding (Show Jumping)			Shooting/Running (10 m Air Pistol/3000m)			Total Points	Final Rank
Athlete	Event	Wins	Rank	MP Points	Time	Rank	MP Points	Time	Rank	MP Points	Time	Rank	MP Points	Total Points	Final Rank
Joel Riker-Fox; Garnett Stevens	Men's	Did not start													
Shauna Biddulph; Kelly Fitzsimmons	Women's	20	7	210	2:22.86	8	265	EL	—N/a	0	15:58.00	8	342	817	8
Joel Riker-Fox; Kelly Fitzsimmons	Mixed	22	8	202	2:06.3	7	298	118.68	5	278	12:23.00	7	557	1335	7

== Racquetball ==
Canada qualified four racquetball athletes (two men and two women). The team was officially named on June 20, 2019.

Men

Athlete	Event	Qualifying Round robin				Round of 16	Quarterfinals	Semifinals	Final	Rank
Athlete	Event	Match 1	Match 2	Match 3	Rank	Opposition Result	Opposition Result	Opposition Result	Opposition Result	Rank
Coby Iwaasa	Men's singles	(United States) Charles Pratt; W 2–1	(Argentina) Shai Manzuri; W 2–1	(Chile) Francisco Troncoso; W 2–0	1	(Colombia) Sebastian Franco; W 2–1	(Mexico) Álvaro Beltrán; L 0–2	Did not advance		5
Samuel Murray	Men's singles	(Dominican Republic) Luis Perez; W 2–1	(Argentina) Fernando Kurzbard; W 2–0	(Cuba) Enier Chacón; L 0–2	1	(Bolivia) Carlos Keller; W 2–1	(Mexico) Rodrigo Montoya; L 0–2	Did not advance		5
Coby Iwaasa; Samuel Murray	Men's doubles	(United States) Rocky Carson; Charles Pratt; L 1–2	(Guatemala) Edwin Galicia; Juan Salvatierra; W 2–1	(Argentina) Fernando Kurzbard; Shai Manzuri; W 2–0	2	(Peru) Jonathan Luque; Sebastian Mendiguri; W 2–0	(Mexico) Javier Mar; Rodrigo Montoya; L 0–2	Did not advance		5
Coby Iwaasa; Samuel Murray	Men's team	—N/a				BYE	Colombia; L 0–2	Did not advance		5

Women

Athlete	Event	Qualifying Round robin				Round of 16	Quarterfinals	Semifinals	Final	Rank
Athlete	Event	Match 1	Match 2	Match 3	Rank	Opposition Result	Opposition Result	Opposition Result	Opposition Result	Rank
Frédérique Lambert	Singles	(United States) Rhonda Rajsich; L 0–2	(Mexico) Montserrat Mejia; L 0–2	-	3	Did not advance				
Jennifer Saunders	Singles	(Costa Rica) Maricruz Ortiz; L 1–2	(United States) Kelani Lawrence; L 0–2	(Ecuador) Maria Paz Muñoz; L 0–2	4	Did not advance				
Frédérique Lambert; Jennifer Saunders	Doubles	(Bolivia) Angelica Barrios; Jenny Daza; L 1–2	(Dominican Republic) Merynanyelly Delgado; Alejandra Jimenez; L 1–2	(Guatemala) Gabriela Martínez; Maria Rodriguez; L 1–2	4	(Ecuador) Maria Jose Muñoz; Maria Paz Muñoz; W 2–1	(Argentina) Natalia Mendez; María José Vargas; L 0–2	Did not advance		5
Frédérique Lambert; Jennifer Saunders	Team	—N/a				Dominican Republic; W 2–1	Argentina; L 0–2	Did not advance		5

== Rowing ==
Canada qualified 13 rowers (five men and eight women). After winning eight gold medals at the last games on home soil, Rowing Canada decided to send a developmental team to these games. The team was officially named on June 25, 2019.

Men

Athlete	Event	Heats		Repechage		Semifinals		Final	
Athlete	Event	Time	Rank	Time	Rank	Time	Rank	Time	Rank
Matthew Finley	Single Sculls	7:10.93	2 SA/B	Bye		7:26.55	5 FB	7:06.84	7
Luc Brodeur; Graham Peeters	Double Sculls	6:53.08	5 R	6:26.77	1 FA	—N/a		6:42.33	6
Alex Bernst; Joshua King	Lwt Double Sculls	6:34.14	2 R	6:30.65	1 FA	—N/a		6:39.10	6

Women

Athlete	Event	Heats		Repechage		Final	
Athlete	Event	Time	Rank	Time	Rank	Time	Rank
Jessica Sevick	Single Sculls	7:44.33	1 FA	—N/a		7:44.51	1st place, gold medalist(s)
Trish Mara	Lwt Single Sculls	8:05.74	3 R	7:52.80	1 FA	7:53.86	4
Layla Balooch; Shannon Kennedy	Double Sculls	7:07.85	3 F	—N/a		7:41.34	6
Kate Haber; Jaclyn Stelmaszyk	Lwt Double Sculls	7:11.13	1 FA	Bye		7:10.35	1st place, gold medalist(s)
Jessie Loutit; Larissa Werbicki	Coxless Pair	7:31.43	2 FA	—N/a		7:36.06	2nd place, silver medalist(s)

Qualification Legend: FA=Final A (medal); FB=Final B (non-medal); SA/B=Semifinals A/B; R=Repechage
- Results given are within the heat.

== Rugby sevens ==
Canada qualified a men's and women's team (of 12 athletes each) automatically.

=== Men's tournament ===
Roster

Canada's roster of 12 athletes was officially named on July 16, 2019. The team was a mix of national team players and younger players looking to gain experience.

- Phil Berna
- Cooper Coats
- Admir Cejvanovic
- Sean Duke
- Nathan Hirayama
- Harry Jones
- Isaac Kaay
- Patrick Kay
- Luke McCloskey
- Josiah Morra
- Brennig Prevost
- Adam Zaruba

Pool stage

Pos	Team	Pld	W	D	L	PF	PA	PD	Pts	Qualification
1	Argentina	3	3	0	0	96	7	+89	9	Semifinals
2	Canada	3	2	0	1	69	12	+57	7	Semifinals
3	Jamaica	3	1	0	2	14	93	−79	5	5–8th place semifinals
4	Uruguay	3	0	0	3	10	77	−67	3	5–8th place semifinals

Source: Lima 2019
Rules for classification: 1) Points; 2) Head-to-head result; 3) Point difference; 4) Points scored; 5) draw.

26 July 2019
12:20

Canada	31–0	Uruguay
Try: Hirayama (2) 1'm, 3'm Cejvanovic (2) 5'c, 8'c Morra 10'c Con: Hirayama (3/5) 6', 9', 10'	Report

Villa María del Triunfo Sports Center
Referee: Cisco Lopez (United States)

27 July 2019
12:40

Canada	31–0	Jamaica
Try: Morra 0'c Coats 3'm Duke 5'c Zaruba (2) 8'c, 11'm Con: Coats (3/4) 1', 5', 8'; Kay (0/1)	Report

Villa María del Triunfo Sports Center
Referee: Cisco Lopez (United States)

27 July 2019
16:55

Argentina	12–7	Canada
Try: Gonzalez 10'c Bazan Velez 12'm Con: Mare (1/2) 10'	Report	Try: Zaruba 7'c Con: Hirayama (1/1) 7'

Villa María del Triunfo Sports Center
Referee: Pualo Duarte (Portugal)

Semifinal

28 July 2019
11:40

Brazil	5–35	Canada
Try: Tranquez 2'm Con: M. Duque (0/1)	Report	Try: Berna (2) 1'c, 4'c Cejvanovic 6'c Zaruba 8'c Jones 13'c Con: Hirayama (5/5) 2', 4', 6', 8', 13'

Villa María del Triunfo Sports Center
Referee: Paulo Duarte (Portugal)

Final

28 July 2019
16:00

(silver) Canada	10–33	Argentina (gold)
Try: Morra 0'm Duke 14'm Con: Hirayama (0/2)	Report	Try: Gonzalez (2) 2'c, 4'c Schulz 5'c Sábato 10'c Bazan Velez 12'm Con: Mare (4/5) 2', 4', 6', 11'

Villa María del Triunfo Sports Center
Referee: Paulo Duarte (Portugal)

=== Women's tournament ===
Roster

Canada's roster of 12 athletes was officially named on July 16, 2019. The team was a mix of national team players and younger players looking to gain experience.

- Delaney Aikens
- Pam Buisa
- Emma Chown
- Caroline Crossley
- Olivia De Couverer
- Asia Hogan-Rochester
- Sara Kaljuvee
- Tausani Levale
- Kaili Lukan
- Kayla Moleschi
- Breanne Nicholas
- Temitiope Ogunjimi

Pool stage

Pos	Team	Pld	W	D	L	PF	PA	PD	Pts	Qualification
1	Canada	3	3	0	0	134	0	+134	9	Semifinals
2	Brazil	3	2	0	1	78	31	+47	7	Semifinals
3	Peru	3	1	0	2	48	94	−46	5	5–8th place semifinals
4	Mexico	3	0	0	3	7	143	−136	3	5–8th place semifinals

Source: Lima 2019
Rules for classification: 1) Points; 2) Head-to-head result; 3) Point difference; 4) Points scored; 5) draw.

26 July 2019
11:05

Canada	54–0	Mexico
Try: Chown (2) 0'c, 4'c Crossley (2) 7'c, 7'c Levale (2) 9'c, 12'c de Couvreur 10'c Aikens 13'm Con: Nicholas (5/5) 1', 4', 7', 8', 11'; Levale (2/3) 9', 12'	Report

Villa María del Triunfo Sports Center
Referee: Natalie Barbier (Peru)

27 July 2019
11:25

Canada	54–0	Peru
Try: Aikens (2) 0'c, 3'c Moleschi 5'c Chown 7'c Hogan-Rochester (3) 7'c, 11'c, 14'c Buisa 10'm Con: Levale (5/5) 0', 4', 5', 7', 8'; Nicholas (2/3) 11', 14'	Report

Villa María del Triunfo Sports Center
Referee: Nerea Livoni (Argentina)

27 July 2019
15:15

Canada	26–0	Brazil
Try: Levale 3'c Lukan 7'm Buisa 9'c Ogunjimi 12'c Con: Nicholas (3/3) 4', 10', 12'; Levale (0/1)	Report

Villa María del Triunfo Sports Center
Referee: Emily Hsieh (United States)

Semifinal

28 July 2019
10:50

Canada	41–0	Colombia
Try: de Couvreur (3) 1'c, 2'm, 8'm Kaljuvee (3) 5'c, 6'c, 12'm Hogan-Rochester 11'm Con: Levale (3/5) 1', 6', 7'; Nicholas (0/2)	Report

Villa María del Triunfo Sports Center
Referee: Emily Hsieh (United States)

Gold medal match

28 July 2019
15:30

(gold) Canada	24–10	United States (silver)
Try: Hogan-Rochester (3) 1'c, 6'm, 8'c Nicholas 11'm Con: Nicholas (2/3) 1', 9'; Levale (0/1)	Report	Try: Canett 2'm Maher 12'm Con: Olsen (0/2)

Villa María del Triunfo Sports Center
Referee: Nehuen Jauri Rivero (Argentina)

== Sailing ==
Canada qualified nine boats and 14 sailors. Canada's team of 14 sailors (eight men and six women) was announced on June 18, 2019.

Men & Women's events

Athlete	Event	Race													Net Points	Final Rank
Athlete	Event	1	2	3	4	5	6	7	8	9	10	11	12	M	Net Points	Final Rank
Robert Davis	Men's laser	3	12	13	11	2	5	13	4	6	8	—N/a		18	82	6
Alex Heinzemann; Justin Barnes	Men's 49er	3	5	1	6	4	3	2	5	2	4	4	2	4	39	3rd place, bronze medalist(s)
Olivia Mew	Women's RS:X	3	6	6	6	5	5	6	5	6	6	5	5	Did not qualify	58	6
Sarah Douglas	Women's laser radial	6	2	4	2	2	3	2	2	1	1	—N/a		2	21	1st place, gold medalist(s)
Alexandra Ten Hove; Mariah Millen	Women's 49er FX	4	4	4	5	3	4	4	RDG	3	3	2	3	3	41.8	4

- RDG=Redress given

Open & Mixed

Athlete	Event	Race																					Net Points	Final Rank
Athlete	Event	1	2	3	4	5	6	7	8	9	10	11	12	13	14	15	16	17	18	M1	M2	M3	Net Points	Final Rank
Luke Ramsay	Sunfish	7	1	2	1	3	7	1	3	4	3	—N/a								8	—N/a		33	2nd place, silver medalist(s)
Michael Brodeur	Kites	4	5	4	6	5	5	7	5	6	9	5	5	4	5	5	5	DNS	4	STP	4	4	85	5
Alex Cox; Nikka Stoger; Richard Walsh	Lightning	5	7	7	6	2	7	7	7	5	7	—N/a								Did not qualify	—N/a		53	7
Max Flinn; Allie Surrette	Nacra 17	9	10	9	8	10	7	9	9	5	8	6	7	—N/a						Did not qualify	—N/a		87	9

- DNS=Did not start, STP=Standard penalty

== Shooting ==
Canada qualified 18 sport shooters (11 men and seven women). The team was officially named on June 20, 2019. Canada swapped a quota in women's rifle to men's rifle after quota allocation.

Men

Athlete	Event	Qualification		Final	
Athlete	Event	Points	Rank	Points	Rank
Stuart Burns	10 metre air pistol	568	10	Did not advance	
Mark Hynes	10 metre air pistol	550	30	Did not advance	
Jim Sandall	25 metre rapid fire pistol	Disqualified		Did not advance	
Christopher Baldwin	10 metre air rifle	618.0	9	Did not advance	
Jeremy Ellis	10 metre air rifle	606.4	21	Did not advance	
Tommy Lapointe	50 metre rifle three positions	1134	16	Did not advance	
Grzegorz Sych	50 metre rifle three positions	1138	15	Did not advance	
Matthew Van Haaren	Trap	116	=6 Q	15	6
Curtis Wennberg	Trap	114	14	Did not advance	
Richard McBride	Skeet	117	=10	Did not advance	
Trysten Routledge	Skeet	122	=3 Q	11	6

Women

Athlete	Event	Qualification		Final	
Athlete	Event	Points	Rank	Points	Rank
Kimberly Britton	10 metre air pistol	545	20	Did not advance	
Yanka Vasileva	10 metre air pistol	567	2 Q	174.1	5
Kimberly Britton	25 metre pistol	548	22	Did not advance	
Lea Wachowich	25 metre pistol	542	23	Did not advance	
Shannon Westlake	10 metre air rifle	604.5	20	Did not advance	
Cindy Luk	50 metre rifle three positions	1130	16	Did not advance	
Shannon Westlake	50 metre rifle three positions	1142	9	Did not advance	
Amanda Chudoba	Trap	107	5 Q	11	6
Elizabeth Longley	Trap	101	=8	Did not advance	

Mixed

Athlete	Event	Qualification		Final	
Athlete	Event	Points	Rank	Points	Rank
Stuart Burns; Kimberly Britton	10 metre air pistol	749	12	Did not advance	
Mark Hynes; Yanka Vasileva	10 metre air pistol	747	13	Did not advance	
Christopher Baldwin; Shannon Westlake	10 metre air rifle	813.4	18	Did not advance	
Curtis Wennberg; Amanda Chudoba	Trap	137	5 Q	30	3rd place, bronze medalist(s)
Matthew Van Haaren; Elizabeth Longley	Trap	138	2 Q	14	6

== Squash ==
Canada qualified a full squash team of six athletes (three men and three women). The team was officially named on May 14, 2019.

Singles and Doubles

Athlete	Event	Round of 32	Round of 16	Quarterfinals	Semifinals	Final	
Athlete	Event	Opposition Result	Opposition Result	Opposition Result	Opposition Result	Opposition Result	Rank
Shawn Delierre	Men's singles	Pedro Mometto (BRA); W 3–1 (12–10, 13–11, 6–11, 11–4)	César Salazar (MEX); L 0–3 (1–11, 2–11, 4–11)	Did not advance			
Nick Sachvie	Men's singles	Andrés Duany Miro (PER); W 3–0 (11–8, 11–3, 11–6)	Miguel Rodríguez (COL); L 0–3 (5–11, 7–11, 6–11)	Did not advance			
Samantha Cornett	Women's singles	—N/a	Pilar Etchechoury (ARG); W 3–0 (13–11, 11–0, 11–7)	Antonella Falcione (ARG); W 3–0 (11–5, 11–2, 11–6)	Olivia Blatchford (USA); L 0–3 (7–11, 5–11, 6–11)	Did not advance	3rd place, bronze medalist(s)
Hollie Naughton	Women's singles	—N/a	Dina Gomez (MEX); W 3–0 (11–2, 11–9, 11–5)	Ana Pinto (CHI); W 3–0 (11–6, 11–5, 11–6)	Amanda Sobhy (USA); L 0–3 (6–11, 10–12, 8–11)	Did not advance	3rd place, bronze medalist(s)
Shawn Delierre; Nick Sachvie	Men's doubles	—N/a	Israel Aguilar (ESA); Jose Mejia (ESA); W 2–1 (11–4, 10–11, 11–1)	Roberto Pezzota (ARG); Leandro Romiglio (ARG); W 2–1 (11–5, 7–11, 11–10)	Arturo Salazar (MEX); César Salazar (MEX); W 2–1 (9–11, 11–7, 11–5)	Todd Harrity (USA); Chris Hanson (USA); L 1–2 (11–6, 5–11, 8–11)	2nd place, silver medalist(s)
Samantha Cornett; Danielle Letourneau	Women's doubles	—N/a		Ximena Leight (PER); Alejandra Arana (PER); W 2–0 (11–1, 11–1)	Laura Tovar (COL); María Tovar (COL); W 2–1 (10–11, 11–6, 11–8)	Amanda Sobhy (USA); Sabrina Sobhy (USA); L 0–2 (10–11, 8–11)	2nd place, silver medalist(s)
Andrew Schnell; Hollie Naughton	Mixed doubles	—N/a		Matías Lacroix Nova (CHI); Camila Gallegos (CHI); W 2–0 (11–2, 11–4)	Catalina Peláez (COL); Miguel Rodríguez (COL); L 0–2 (10–11, 5–11)	Did not advance	3rd place, bronze medalist(s)

Team

Athlete	Event	Group Stage				Round of 16	Quarterfinals	Semifinals	Final	
Athlete	Event	Opposition Result	Opposition Result	Opposition Result	Rank	Opposition Result	Opposition Result	Opposition Result	Opposition Result	Rank
Shawn Delierre; Nick Sachvie; Andrew Schnell	Men's team	Argentina; W 3–0	El Salvador; W 3–0	—N/a	1 Q	Bye	Peru; W 2–1	Colombia; L 0–2	Did not advance	3rd place, bronze medalist(s)
Samantha Cornett; Danielle Letourneau; Hollie Naughton	Women's team	Peru; W 3–0	Colombia; W 2–1	Guyana; W 3–0	1 Q	—N/a	Chile; W 3–0	Colombia; W 3–0	United States; L 0–2	2nd place, silver medalist(s)

== Softball ==
Canada qualified a women's team (of 15 athletes) by being ranked in the top five nations at the 2017 Pan American Championships. The men's team which has won every single gold medal awarded at the Pan American Games failed to qualify.

=== Women's tournament ===
Roster

- Natalie Wideman
- Erika Polidori
- Joanne Lye
- Holly Speers
- Jennifer Salling
- Victoria Hayward
- Janet Leung
- Danielle Lawrie
- Sara Groenewegen
- Emma Entzminger
- Jennifer Gilbert
- Larissa Franklin
- Eujenna Caira
- Kaleigh Rafter
- Morgan Rackel

Preliminary round

Team	Pld	W	L	RF	RA	RD	Qualification
United States	5	5	0	37	1	+36	Qualified for the semifinals
Canada	5	4	1	23	7	+16	Qualified for the semifinals
Puerto Rico	5	3	2	18	12	+6	Qualified for the semifinals
Mexico	5	2	3	20	17	+3	Qualified for the semifinals
Venezuela	5	1	4	9	41	−32	
Peru	5	0	5	5	34	−29	

4 August 2019; 10:00	Canada	3–1	Puerto Rico	Campo de Softbol, Lima; Attendance: 357
4 August 2019; 10:00		Boxscore		Campo de Softbol, Lima; Attendance: 357

5 August 2019; 13:00	Canada	8–0	Venezuela	Campo de Softbol, Lima; Attendance: 0
5 August 2019; 13:00		Boxscore		Campo de Softbol, Lima; Attendance: 0

6 August 2019; 10:00	Canada	1–6	United States	Campo de Softbol, Lima; Attendance: 312
6 August 2019; 10:00		Boxscore		Campo de Softbol, Lima; Attendance: 312

7 August 2019; 16:00	Peru	0–7	Canada	Campo de Softbol, Lima; Attendance: 453
7 August 2019; 16:00		Boxscore		Campo de Softbol, Lima; Attendance: 453

8 August 2019; 13:00	Mexico	0–4	Canada	Campo de Softbol, Lima; Attendance: 325
8 August 2019; 13:00		Boxscore		Campo de Softbol, Lima; Attendance: 325

Semifinals

9 August 2019; 14:00	United States	2 - 3	Canada	Campo de Softbol, Lima; Attendance: 540
9 August 2019; 14:00		Boxscore		Campo de Softbol, Lima; Attendance: 540

Grand final

10 August 2019; 14:00	United States	3–1	Canada	Campo de Softbol, Lima; Attendance: 850
10 August 2019; 14:00		Boxscore		Campo de Softbol, Lima; Attendance: 850

== Swimming ==
Canada entered a total of 20 swimmers (four men and 16 women). The team is considered as a B team, full of swimmers who are up and coming and did not qualify for the 2019 World Aquatics Championships. Canada's open water swimmers were selected after the 2019 Canadian Open Water Swimming Trials held in the Cayman Islands. The winner of each event and the highest ranked swimmer born between 1999 and 2005 qualified for each respective event. Mabel Zavaros was later replaced with swimmer Mackenzie Glover.

Key

- Note – Ranks given are for the entire round
- NR – National record
- QA – Qualified for Final A
- QB – Qualified for Final B

Men

Athlete	Event	Heat		Final	
Athlete	Event	Time	Rank	Time	Rank
Javier Acevedo	100 m backstroke	55.51	5 FA	55.14	5
Javier Acevedo	200 m backstroke	2:01.19	4 FA	1:59.70	4
Javier Acevedo	200 m individual medley	2:03.33	=6 FA	2:04.23	7
James Dergousoff	100 m breaststroke	55.51	5 FA	55.14	5
James Dergousoff	200 m breaststroke	2:13.73	8 FA	2:15.00	8
James Dergousoff	200 m individual medley	1:02.17	10 FB	1:02.00	10
Raben Dommann	10 km open water	—N/a		1:55:33.1	9
Jon McKay	10 km open water	—N/a		1:54:19.5	6

Women

Athlete	Event	Heat		Final	
Athlete	Event	Time	Rank	Time	Rank
Alyson Ackman	50 m freestyle	25.78	7 FA	25.87	8
Alyson Ackman	100 m freestyle	55.78	3 FA	55.81	5
Alyson Ackman	200 m freestyle	2:00.18	3 FA	1:59.92	4
Alyson Ackman	400 m freestyle	4:12.42	2 FA	4:12.05	3rd place, bronze medalist(s)
Bailey Andison	200 m individual medley	2:15.15	3 FA	2:14.14	3rd place, bronze medalist(s)
Haley Black	100 m butterfly	59.30	4 FA	59.32	5
Madison Broad	100 m backstroke	1:02.99	8 FA	1:02.44	6
Madison Broad	200 m backstroke	2:14.25	6 FA	2:12.82	6
Tessa Cieplucha	200 m breaststroke	2:30.09	6 FA	2:29.59	7
Tessa Cieplucha	400 m individual medley	4:45.61	2 FA	4:39.90	1st place, gold medalist(s)
Alexia Zevnik	200 m backstroke	2:11.60	3 FA	2:10.95	3rd place, bronze medalist(s)
Danielle Hanus	100 m backstroke	1:00.75	2 FA	1:00.34	2nd place, silver medalist(s)
Danielle Hanus	100 m butterfly	58.94	2 FA	58.93	2nd place, silver medalist(s)
Danielle Hanus	200 m butterfly	2:13.26	6 FA	2:13.95	7
Mary-Sophie Harvey	200 m breaststroke	2:29.06	4 FA	2:28.56	5
Mary-Sophie Harvey	200 m butterfly	2:12.67	=3 FA	2:11.68	2nd place, silver medalist(s)
Mary-Sophie Harvey	400 m individual medley	4:42.70	1 FA	4:43.20	3rd place, bronze medalist(s)
Faith Knelson	100 m breaststroke	1:08.47	6 FA	1:07.42	3rd place, bronze medalist(s)
Kyla Leibel	50 m freestyle	25.77	6 FA	25.52	=4
Danica Ludlow	400 m freestyle	4:12.66	3 FA	4:11.97	2nd place, silver medalist(s)
Katerine Savard	200 m freestyle	2:01.32	7 FA	2:01.18	7
Erika Seltenreich-Hodgson	200 m individual medley	2:15.78	4 FA	2:15.52	6
Alexia Zevnik	100 m freestyle	55.36	2 FA	55.04	2nd place, silver medalist(s)
Chantel Jeffrey	10 km open water	—N/a		2:04:45.0	9
Kate Sanderson	10 km open water	—N/a		2:02:52.2	6
Alyson Ackman; Kyla Leibel; Katerine Savard; Alexia Zevnik	4 × 100 m freestyle relay	—N/a		3:41.01	3rd place, bronze medalist(s)
Alyson Ackman; Katerine Savard; Danica Ludlow; Mary-Sophie Harvey	4 × 200 m freestyle relay	—N/a		7:59.16	2nd place, silver medalist(s)
Danielle Hanus; Faith Knelson; Haley Black; Alexia Zevnik; Mackenzie Glover; Mary-Sophie Harvey; Katerine Savard; Alyson Ackman	4 × 100 m medley relay	4:10.26	3 FA	4:01.90	2nd place, silver medalist(s)

- Swimmers in italics swam in the preliminaries only and received medals.

Mixed

Athlete	Event	Heat		Final	
Athlete	Event	Time	Rank	Time	Rank
Javier Acevedo; James Dergousoff; Alyson Ackman; Alexia Zevnik; Kyla Leibel	4 × 100 m freestyle relay	3:36.27	3 FA	3:35.19	6
Javier Acevedo; James Dergousoff; Danielle Hanus; Alexia Zevnik; Haley Black; Kyla Leibel	4 × 100 m medley relay	3:54.27	3 FA	3:49.97	2nd place, silver medalist(s)

- Swimmers in italics swam in the preliminaries only and received medals (if medaled).

== Surfing ==
Canada qualified seven surfers (three men and four women) in the sport's debut at the Pan American Games. The team was officially named on June 7, 2019.

Artistic

Athlete	Event	Round 1	Round 2	Round 3	Round 4	Repechage 1	Repechage 2	Repechage 3	Repechage 4	Repechage 5	Bronze medal	Final	
Athlete	Event	Opposition Result	Opposition Result	Opposition Result	Opposition Result	Opposition Result	Opposition Result	Opposition Result	Opposition Result	Opposition Result	Opposition Result	Opposition Result	Rank
Cody Young	Men's open	Schulz (USA); W 10.43–7.50 Q	McGonagle (CRC); L 12.27–15.40	Did not advance		Bye	Correa (PER); L 11.47–16.00	Did not advance					
Finn Spencer	Men's stand up paddleboard	Martino (PER), de Armas (PUR); L 8.43 Q	Hughes (USA), de Cabo (ARG); W 12.50 Q	Gómez (COL); L 10.70–16.07	Did not advance	Bye		Diniz (BRA); L 10.17–13.14	Did not advance				
Bethany Zelasko	Women's open	Cortez (ESA); W 9.57–5.13 Q	Pellizzari (ARG); L 5.87–6.83	Did not advance		Bye	Giunta (PER); L 9.00–13.67	Did not advance					
Catherine Bruhwiler	Women's stand up paddleboard	Torres (PER), Pacelli (BRA); L 3.10	Did not advance			Soriano (PER), Pérez (CHI); W 7.10 Q	Cosoleto (ARG); L 4.74–10.40	Did not advance					
Mathea Dempfle-Olin	Women's longboard	Gil (ARG), Machuca (MEX); L 8.73 Q	Calmon (BRA), Soriano (ECU); L 8.63 Q	Thompson (USA); W 12.03–10.36	Calmon (BRA); L 10.30–10.60	Bye				—N/a	Reyes (PER); L 8.70–13.50	Did not advance	3rd place, bronze medalist(s)

Race

Athlete	Event	Time	Rank
Michael Darbyshire	Men's stand up paddleboard	DNS	
Lina Augaitis	Women's stand up paddleboard	34:40.2	4

== Table tennis ==
Canada qualified a full table tennis team of six athletes (three men and three women). The team was officially named on July 15, 2019.

Singles and Doubles

Athlete	Event	Round of 32	Round of 16	Quarterfinals	Semifinals	Final	Rank
Athlete	Event	Opposition Result	Opposition Result	Opposition Result	Opposition Result	Opposition Result	Rank
Jeremy Hazin	Men's singles	Gatica (ECU); W 4–0	Miño (ECU); L 1–4	Did not advance			
Eugene Wang	Men's singles	Pereira (CUB); W 4–3	Cifuentes (ARG); W 4–1	Aguirre (PAR); W 4–2	Calderano (BRA); L 2–4	Did not advance	3rd place, bronze medalist(s)
Alicia Côté	Women's singles	Niño (VEN); L 2–4	Did not advance				
Mo Zhang	Women's singles	Bye	Silva (MEX); L 1–4	Did not advance			
Jeremy Hazin; Eugene Wang	Men's doubles	—N/a	Aguirre / Toranzos (PAR); W 4–3	Santos / Wu (DOM); L 3–4	Did not advance		
Alicia Côté; Mo Zhang	Women's doubles	—N/a	Cordero / Enriquez (GUA); W 4–1	Ortega / Vega (CHI); W 4–1	Wu / Zhang (USA); L 1–4	Did not advance	3rd place, bronze medalist(s)
Eugene Wang; Mo Zhang	Mixed doubles	—N/a	Ramos / Medina (COL); W 4–0	Campos / Fonseca (CUB); W 4–0	Jha / Wu (USA); W 4–1	Tsuboi / Takahashi (BRA); W 4–1	1st place, gold medalist(s)

Teams

Athlete	Event	Group Stage			Quarterfinals	Semifinals	Final	
Athlete	Event	Opposition Result	Opposition Result	Rank	Opposition Result	Opposition Result	Opposition Result	Rank
Jeremy Hazin; Marko Medjugorac; Eugene Wang	Men's team	Brazil; L 0–3	Mexico; W 3–2	2 Q	Cuba; L 1–3	Did not advance		
Alicia Côté; Ivy Liao; Mo Zhang	Women's team	Chile; W 3–0	Peru; W 3–1	1 Q	Mexico; W 3–0	Puerto Rico; L 0–3	Did not advance	3rd place, bronze medalist(s)

== Taekwondo ==
Canada qualified a full team of 13 athletes in taekwondo (eight in kyorugi and five in poomsae). The team was officially named on June 11, 2019.

Kyorugi
Men

Athlete	Event	Round of 16	Quarterfinals	Semifinals	Repechage	Final / BM	Rank
Athlete	Event	Opposition Result	Opposition Result	Opposition Result	Opposition Result	Opposition Result	Rank
Miguel Diaz	-58 kg	Kim (USA); L 9–29	Did not advance				
Hervan Nkogho	-68 kg	Choy (GUY); W 24–4	Nava (MEX); W 16–12	Pie (DOM); L 7–18	—N/a	Soto (CRC); W 13–12	3rd place, bronze medalist(s)
Christopher Iliesco	-80 kg	Ferrera (HON); L 8–8	Did not advance				
Jordan Stewart	+80 kg	Alleyne (BAR); W 24–4	Andrade (BRA); L 4–14	Did not advance			

Women

Athlete	Event	Round of 16	Quarterfinals	Semifinals	Repechage	Final	Rank
Athlete	Event	Opposition Result	Opposition Result	Opposition Result	Opposition Result	Opposition Result	Rank
Yvette Yong	-49 kg	Bye	Aguirre (CUB); L 7–20	Did not advance			
Skylar Park	-57 kg	Bye	Aguirre (CHI); W 17–11	Évolo (ARG); W 14–1	Bye	Zolotic (USA); L 22–32	2nd place, silver medalist(s)
Ashley Kraayeveld	-67 kg	Molina (HON); W 16–4	Rodríguez (DOM); W 12–7	McPherson (USA); L 9–11	—N/a	Dumar (COL); L 4–13	=5
Rachel Cuma	+67 kg	Orihuella (PER); W 14–3	Carbonell (CUB); L 9–20	Did not advance			

Poomsae

Athlete (s)	Event	Round 1		Round 2		Average	Rank
Athlete (s)	Event	Result	Rank	Result	Rank	Average	Rank
Abbas Assadian Jr.	Men's individual	7.38	4	7.40	4	7.390	3rd place, bronze medalist(s)
Valerie Ho	Women's individual	7.06	6	6.96	6	7.010	6
Jinsu Ha; Michelle Lee	Mixed pairs	7.34	2	7.54	1	7.440	2nd place, silver medalist(s)
Abbas Assadian Jr. Mark Bush; Jinsu Ha; Valerie Ho; Michelle Lee	Mixed freestyle teams	7.120	2	—N/a		7.120	2nd place, silver medalist(s)

== Tennis ==
Canada qualified three female tennis athletes. The team was officially named on July 15, 2019.

Women

Athlete	Event	Round of 32	Round of 16	Quarterfinals	Semifinals	Final / BM	
Athlete	Event	Opposition Score	Opposition Score	Opposition Score	Opposition Score	Opposition Score	Rank
Jada Bui	Singles	Osorio (COL); W 5–7, 7–5, 6–4	Stefani (BRA); W 6–3, 6–2	Cepede Royg (PAR); L 4–6, 0–6	Did not advance		
Rebecca Marino	Singles	Alves (BRA); L 7–5, 4–6, 4–6	Did not advance				
Alexandra Vagramov	Singles	Zeballos (BOL); W 3–6, 6–4, 6–3	Arconada (USA); L 5–7, 2–6	Did not advance			
Jada Bui; Alexandra Vagramov	Doubles	—N/a	Guzmán (PER); Schaefer (PER); L 4–6, 4–6	Did not advance			

== Triathlon ==
Canada qualified a full triathlon team of six athletes (three men and three women). The team was officially named on May 29, 2019. Triathlon Canada is using the event as an opportunity for development and is sending a group of young athletes to gain exposure and experience.

Athlete	Event	Swim (1.5 km)	Trans 1	Bike (40 km)	Trans 2	Run (10 km)	Total	Rank
Charles Paquet	Men's individual						1.51.25	6
Taylor Forbes	Men's individual						1.56.16	19
Karol Ann Roy	Women's individual						2.06.20	13

Mixed Relay

Athletes	Event	Total Times per Athlete (Swim 250 m, Bike 7 km, Run 1.5 km)	Total Group Time	Rank
Desirae Ridenour; Charles Paquet; Hannah Rose Henry; Alexis Lepage	Mixed relay		1.20.51	2nd place, silver medalist(s)

== Volleyball ==
=== Beach ===
Canada qualified the maximum of four beach volleyball athletes (two men and two women). The team was officially named on June 26, 2019.

Athletes	Event	Preliminary round				Qualifying round	Quarterfinals	Semifinals	Finals	Rank
Athletes	Event	Opposition Score	Opposition Score	Opposition Score	Rank	Opposition Score	Opposition Score	Opposition Score	Opposition Score	Rank
Aaron Nusbaum; Mike Plantinga	Men's	Mora / López (NCA); W 2–0 (22–20, 30–28)	Ontiveros / Virgen (MEX); L 0–2 (14–21, 19–21)	M. Grimalt / E. Grimalt (CHI); L 0–2 (11–21, 14–21)	3 Q	Satterfield / Burik (USA); W 2–0 (22–20, 21–12)	Hernández / Gómez (VEN); W 2–1 (28–26, 22–24, 7–15)	M. Grimalt / E. Grimalt (CHI); L 0–2 (12–21, 14–21)	Capogrosso / Azaad (ARG); L 0–2 (17–21, 18–21)	4
Amanda Harnett; Marie-Christine Lapointe	Women's	Mendoza / Rodriguez (NCA); W 2–1 (21–17, 14–21, 15–9)	Alvarado / Bethancourt (GUA); W 2–0 (21–16, 21–9)	Gallay / Pereyra (ARG); L 1–2 (13–21, 22–20, 11–15)	2 Q	Ayala / Ríos (COL); L 1–2 (21–15, 14–21, 10–15)	Did not advance	Orellana / Revuelta (MEX); W 2–0 (21–16, 21–17)	Allcca – Mendoza (PER); W 2–0 (21–0, 21–0)	9

=== Indoor ===
Canada qualified a women's team (of 12 athletes) by winning the bronze medal at the 2018 Women's Pan-American Volleyball Cup.

=== Women's tournament ===
Roster

Canada's roster of 12 athletes was officially named on July 18, 2019. The team was a mix of national team players and younger players looking to gain experience.

- Brianna Beamish
- Megan Beedie
- Megan Cyr
- Sarah Chase
- Hilary Howe
- Sara Kovac
- Kristen Moncks
- Alicia Ogoms
- Kim Robitaille
- Lauren Sproule
- Layne Van Buskirk
- Jazmine White

Group A

Pos	Team	Pld	W	L	Pts	SW	SL	SR	SPW	SPL	SPR	Qualification
1	Dominican Republic	3	3	0	14	9	1	9.000	252	212	1.189	Semifinals
2	Colombia	3	2	1	9	7	5	1.400	289	274	1.055	Semifinals
3	Peru (H)	3	1	2	5	4	7	0.571	239	252	0.948	5th–6th place match
4	Canada	3	0	3	2	2	9	0.222	224	266	0.842	7th–8th place match

Source: Lima 2019
(H) Host

7 August 2019; 20:30	Peru	3–1	Canada	Callao Sports Center; Referees: Héctor Ortiz (PUR), Jediel Hosana de Carvalho (BRA)
7 August 2019; 20:30	(25–17, 25–21, 22–25, 25–18); P2			Callao Sports Center; Referees: Héctor Ortiz (PUR), Jediel Hosana de Carvalho (BRA)

8 August 2019; 18:30	Dominican Republic	3–0	Canada	Callao Sports Center
8 August 2019; 18:30	(25–16, 25–22, 25–23); P2 P3			Callao Sports Center

9 August 2019; 18:30	Colombia	3–1	Canada	Callao Sports Center
9 August 2019; 18:30	(25–18, 25–19, 19–25, 25–20); P2 P3			Callao Sports Center

Seventh place match

10 August 2019; 13:00	Canada	0–3	United States	Callao Sports Center
10 August 2019; 13:00	(16–25, 14–25, 23–25); P2 P3			Callao Sports Center

== Water polo ==
Canada qualified a men's and women's team (of 11 athletes each) automatically as being the only members of zone 4.

=== Men's tournament ===
Roster

Canada's roster of 11 athletes was officially named on July 5, 2019.

- Nicolas Constantin-Bicari
- Jérémie Côté
- Bogdan Djerkovic
- Reuel D'Souza
- Aleksa Gardijan
- Matthew Halajian
- Gaelan Patterso
- Milan Radenovic
- Aria Soleimanipak
- Mark Spooner
- George Torakis

Group A

Pos	Team	Pld	W	D	L	GF	GA	GD	Pts	Qualification
1	United States	3	3	0	0	58	18	+40	6	Quarterfinals
2	Canada	3	2	0	1	51	31	+20	4	Quarterfinals
3	Cuba	3	1	0	2	27	49	−22	2	Quarterfinals
4	Puerto Rico	3	0	0	3	16	54	−38	0	Quarterfinals

Source: Lima 2019
Rules for classification: 1) points; 2) head-to-head points; 3) head-to-head goal difference; 4) head-to-head number of goals scored; 5) goal difference.

4 August 2019; 18:00	Report	Canada	20–7	Puerto Rico	Villa María del Truinfo Aquatic Centre, Lima; Referees: Marcus Gresele (BRA); Daniel Vázquez (MEX)
4 August 2019; 18:00	Report	Score by quarters: 4–0, 5–1, 7–2, 4–4			Villa María del Truinfo Aquatic Centre, Lima; Referees: Marcus Gresele (BRA); Daniel Vázquez (MEX)
4 August 2019; 18:00	Report	Constantin-Bicari 5	Goals	Loubriel 3	Villa María del Truinfo Aquatic Centre, Lima; Referees: Marcus Gresele (BRA); Daniel Vázquez (MEX)

5 August 2019; 15:00	Report	Canada	11–13	United States	Villa María del Truinfo Aquatic Centre, Lima; Referees: Boris Margeta (SLO); Arkadii Voevodin (RUS)
5 August 2019; 15:00	Report	Score by quarters: 3–4, 1–1, 4–6, 3–2			Villa María del Truinfo Aquatic Centre, Lima; Referees: Boris Margeta (SLO); Arkadii Voevodin (RUS)
5 August 2019; 15:00	Report	Côté 3	Goals	Hooper 5	Villa María del Truinfo Aquatic Centre, Lima; Referees: Boris Margeta (SLO); Arkadii Voevodin (RUS)

6 August 2019; 15:00	Report	Cuba	11–20	Canada	Villa María del Truinfo Aquatic Centre, Lima; Referees: Gerardo Arellano (MEX); Boris Margeta (SLO)
6 August 2019; 15:00	Report	Score by quarters: 2–6, 3–5, 2–4, 4–5			Villa María del Truinfo Aquatic Centre, Lima; Referees: Gerardo Arellano (MEX); Boris Margeta (SLO)
6 August 2019; 15:00	Report	Carales, Contreras 3	Goals	Constantin-Bicari 6	Villa María del Truinfo Aquatic Centre, Lima; Referees: Gerardo Arellano (MEX); Boris Margeta (SLO)

Quarterfinals

8 August 2019; 15:00	Report	Canada	13–11	Mexico	Villa María del Triunfo Aquatic Centre, Lima; Referees: Steven Rotsart (USA); Juan Menéndez (CUB)
8 August 2019; 15:00	Report	Score by quarters: 4–4, 3–4, 3–2, 3–1			Villa María del Triunfo Aquatic Centre, Lima; Referees: Steven Rotsart (USA); Juan Menéndez (CUB)
8 August 2019; 15:00	Report	Constantin-Bicari, D'Souza 4	Goals	Álvarez 5	Villa María del Triunfo Aquatic Centre, Lima; Referees: Steven Rotsart (USA); Juan Menéndez (CUB)

Semifinals

9 August 2019; 18:00	Report	Canada	8–7	Brazil	Villa María del Triunfo Aquatic Centre, Lima; Referees: Boris Margeta (SLO); Reinel Castillo (PUR)
9 August 2019; 18:00	Report	Score by quarters: 3–1, 0–0, 1–3, 4–3			Villa María del Triunfo Aquatic Centre, Lima; Referees: Boris Margeta (SLO); Reinel Castillo (PUR)
9 August 2019; 18:00	Report	Constantin-Bicari, Côté 2	Goals	Coutinho, Guimarães 2	Villa María del Triunfo Aquatic Centre, Lima; Referees: Boris Margeta (SLO); Reinel Castillo (PUR)

Gold medal match

10 August 2019; 19:30	Report	(silver) Canada	6–18	United States (gold)	Villa María del Triunfo Aquatic Centre, Lima; Referees: Boris Margeta (SLO); Arkadii Voevodin (RUS)
10 August 2019; 19:30	Report	Score by quarters: 1–4, 1–6, 1–2, 3–6			Villa María del Triunfo Aquatic Centre, Lima; Referees: Boris Margeta (SLO); Arkadii Voevodin (RUS)
10 August 2019; 19:30	Report	Gardijan 2	Goals	three players 5	Villa María del Triunfo Aquatic Centre, Lima; Referees: Boris Margeta (SLO); Arkadii Voevodin (RUS)

=== Women's tournament ===
Roster

Canada's roster of 11 athletes was officially named on July 5, 2019.

- Krystina Alogbo
- Joelle Bekhazi
- Kyra Christmas
- Monika Eggens
- Shae Fournier
- Jessica Gaudreault
- Elyse Lemay-Lavoie
- Kelly McKee
- Hayley McKelvey
- Kindred Paul
- Emma Wright

Preliminary round

Pos	Team	Pld	W	D	L	GF	GA	GD	Pts	Qualification
1	Canada	3	3	0	0	75	13	+62	6	Quarterfinals
2	Cuba	3	2	0	1	37	29	+8	4	Quarterfinals
3	Mexico	3	1	0	2	32	41	−9	2	Quarterfinals
4	Peru (H)	3	0	0	3	8	69	−61	0	Quarterfinals

Source: Lima 2019
Rules for classification: 1) points; 2) head-to-head points; 3) head-to-head goal difference; 4) head-to-head number of goals scored; 5) goal difference.
(H) Hosts

4 August 2019; 9:30	Report	Cuba	5–20	Canada	Villa María del Triunfo Aquatic Centre, Lima; Referees: Reynel Torres (PUR); Amber Drury (USA)
4 August 2019; 9:30	Report	Score by quarters: 1-4, 1-4, 0-7, 3-5			Villa María del Triunfo Aquatic Centre, Lima; Referees: Reynel Torres (PUR); Amber Drury (USA)
4 August 2019; 9:30	Report	Villa 3	Goals	Crevier, Fournier 4	Villa María del Triunfo Aquatic Centre, Lima; Referees: Reynel Torres (PUR); Amber Drury (USA)

5 August 2019; 9:30	Report	Peru	2–28	Canada	Villa María del Triunfo Aquatic Centre, Lima; Referees: Marcus Gresele (BRA); Ángel Irizarry (PUR)
5 August 2019; 9:30	Report	Score by quarters: 0-9, 0-6, 1-7, 1-6			Villa María del Triunfo Aquatic Centre, Lima; Referees: Marcus Gresele (BRA); Ángel Irizarry (PUR)
5 August 2019; 9:30	Report	Deza, Urquiza 1	Goals	Crevier, Wright 5	Villa María del Triunfo Aquatic Centre, Lima; Referees: Marcus Gresele (BRA); Ángel Irizarry (PUR)

6 August 2019; 12:30	Report	Canada	27–6	Mexico	Villa María del Triunfo Aquatic Centre, Lima; Referees: Steven Rotsart (USA); Fabio Toffoli (BRA)
6 August 2019; 12:30	Report	Score by quarters: 6-3, 5-1, 9-1, 7-1			Villa María del Triunfo Aquatic Centre, Lima; Referees: Steven Rotsart (USA); Fabio Toffoli (BRA)
6 August 2019; 12:30	Report	Wright 5	Goals	Ramírez 2	Villa María del Triunfo Aquatic Centre, Lima; Referees: Steven Rotsart (USA); Fabio Toffoli (BRA)

Quarterfinal

8 August 2019; 12:30	Report	Venezuela	3–22	Canada	VMT Aquatic Centre, Lima; Referees: Diego Hernán Garibaldi (ARG); José Angel Ortiz Irizarry (PUR)
8 August 2019; 12:30	Report	Score by quarters: 0–8, 2–4, 0–6, 1–4			VMT Aquatic Centre, Lima; Referees: Diego Hernán Garibaldi (ARG); José Angel Ortiz Irizarry (PUR)

Semifinal

9 August 2019; 11:00	Report	Brazil	5–19	Canada	VMT Aquatic Centre, Lima; Referees: Arkadi Voevodin (RUS); José Angel Ortiz Irizarry (PUR)
9 August 2019; 11:00	Report	Score by quarters: 1–4, 3–5, 1–5, 0–5			VMT Aquatic Centre, Lima; Referees: Arkadi Voevodin (RUS); José Angel Ortiz Irizarry (PUR)

Gold medal match

10 August 2019; 12:30	Report	(silver) Canada	4–24	United States (gold)	VMT Aquatic Centre, Lima; Referees: Daniel Rodrigo Vázquez (MEX); Fernado Varela Llanos (PER)
10 August 2019; 12:30	Report	Score by quarters: 1–6, 2–7, 1–10, 0–1			VMT Aquatic Centre, Lima; Referees: Daniel Rodrigo Vázquez (MEX); Fernado Varela Llanos (PER)
10 August 2019; 12:30	Report	four players 1	Goals	M. Fischer 6	VMT Aquatic Centre, Lima; Referees: Daniel Rodrigo Vázquez (MEX); Fernado Varela Llanos (PER)

== Water skiing ==
Canada qualified a full team of six water skiers and wakeboarders (three per gender). The team as officially named on July 19, 2019.

Waterski and Wakeboard

Athlete	Event	Preliminary	Rank	LCQ	Rank	Final	Rank
Dorien Llewellyn	Men's jump	198	5 Q	—N/a		207	3rd place, bronze medalist(s)
Dorien Llewellyn	Men's slalom	1.00/58/10.75	7 Q	—N/a		3.00/58/10.75	=5
Dorien Llewellyn	Men's tricks	198	5 Q	—N/a		10430	2nd place, silver medalist(s)
Stephen Neveu	Men's slalom	2.00/58/10.25	2 Q	—N/a		2.00/58/10.25	2nd place, silver medalist(s)
Christian Primrose	Men's wakeboard	81.33	2 Q	Bye		68.78	4
Paige Rini	Women's jump	146	=4 Q	—N/a		147	5
Paige Rini	Women's slalom	0.50/55/10.75	3 Q	—N/a		3.00/55/11.25	3rd place, bronze medalist(s)
Paige Rini	Women's tricks	8920	2 Q	—N/a		8820	3rd place, bronze medalist(s)
Whitney McClintock	Women's jump	159	=2 Q	—N/a		158	2nd place, silver medalist(s)
Whitney McClintock	Women's slalom	0.50/55/10.25	2 Q	—N/a		5.50/55/10.75	2nd place, silver medalist(s)
Whitney McClintock	Women's tricks	8760	3 Q	—N/a		8690	4
Erika Langman	Women's wakeboard	34.89	3 LCQ	39.78	1 Q	61.78	4

Overall

Athlete	Event	Trick	Ov. Trick	Slalom	Ov. Slalom	Jump	Ov. Jump	Overall	Rank
Dorien Llewellyn	Men's overall	2.00/58/10.75	980.39	10660	1000.00	204	905.11	2885.50	1st place, gold medalist(s)
Paige Rini	Women's overall	1.00/55/10.75	882.88	4090	1000.00	134	691.87	2574.75	3rd place, bronze medalist(s)
Whitney McClintock	Women's overall	2.50/55/10.75	909.91	8060	954.98	165	968.02	2832.91	2nd place, silver medalist(s)

== Weightlifting ==
Canada qualified four weightlifters (one man and three women). The team as officially named on July 18, 2019.

Athlete	Event	Snatch		Clean & Jerk		Total	Rank
Athlete	Event	Result	Rank	Result	Rank	Total	Rank
Boady Santavy	Men's 96 kg	176	1	208	2	384	2nd place, silver medalist(s)
Rachel Leblanc-Bazinet	Women's 55 kg	85	5	108	6	193	5
Tali Darsigny	Women's 59 kg	94	4	109	9	203	7
Maude Charron	Women's 64 kg	101	4	123	4	224	4

== Wrestling ==
Canada qualified a team of 11 wrestlers (seven men and four women). The team was officially named on May 31, 2019. Jade Parsons replaced Diana Weicker, five days before the competition.

Men's freestyle

Athlete	Event	Preliminaries	Quarterfinals	Semifinals	Repechage	Final / BM	Rank
Athlete	Event	Opposition Result	Opposition Result	Opposition Result	Opposition Result	Opposition Result	Rank
Darthe Capellan	57 kg	—N/a	Ramírez (DOM); L 0–10	Did not advance	—N/a	Tigreros (COL); W 8–7	3rd place, bronze medalist(s)
Jevon Balfour	74 kg	—N/a	Guzmán (COL); W 12–4	Gómez (PUR); L 0–11	—N/a	Llano (ARG); W 10–0	3rd place, bronze medalist(s)
Alex Moore	86 kg	Báez (ARG); W 10–0	Torreblanca (CUB); L 0–10	Did not advance	Ramírez (PAR); W 10–0	Downey (USA); L 0–5^{F}	=5
Jordie Steen	97 kg	—N/a	Díaz (VEN); L 0–3	Did not advance	—N/a	Pérez (DOM); L 0–10	=5
Korey Jarvis	125 kg	—N/a	Santos (PUR); W 11–0	Gwiazdowski (USA); L 0–11	—N/a	Gunning (PER); W 7–0	3rd place, bronze medalist(s)

Greco-Roman

Athlete	Event	Preliminaries	Quarterfinals	Semifinals	Repechage	Final / BM	Rank
Athlete	Event	Opposition Result	Opposition Result	Opposition Result	Opposition Result	Opposition Result	Rank
Phillip Barreiro	87 kg	Bye	Muñoz (COL); L 0–9	Did not advance			
Thomas Barreiro	97 kg	—N/a	Hancock (USA); L 0–9	Did not advance	—N/a	Mejía (HON); L 0–8	=5

Women's freestyle

Athlete	Event	Preliminaries	Quarterfinals	Semifinals	Repechage	Final / BM	Rank
Athlete	Event	Opposition Result	Opposition Result	Opposition Result	Opposition Result	Opposition Result	Rank
Jade Parsons	53 kg	—N/a	Figueroa (COL); W 5–0^{F}	Hildebrandt (USA); L 0–10	—N/a	Valverde (ECU); W 6–3	3rd place, bronze medalist(s)
Hannah Taylor	57 kg	Bye	Penalber (BRA); L 5–6	Did not advance			
Olivia Di Bacco	68 kg	—N/a	Sánchez (CUB); W 5–2	Acosta (VEN); W 9–4^{F}	Bye	Mensah (USA); L 0–4^{F}	2nd place, silver medalist(s)
Justina Di Stasio	76 kg	—N/a	Lázaro (VEN); W 10–0	Olaya (COL); W 9–0	Bye	Ferreira (BRA); W 2–1	1st place, gold medalist(s)

== See also ==
- Canada at the 2019 Parapan American Games
- Canada at the 2020 Summer Olympics
