= Canoeing at the 2019 Pan American Games – Men's extreme slalom K-1 =

Men's extreme canoe slalom K-1 at the 2019 Pan American Games
- Venue: Cañete River, Lunahuaná
- Date: 2-4 August
- Competitors: 10 from 10 nations

Medalists
Gold medal	Pepe Gonçalves	Brazil
Silver medal	Joshua Joseph	United States
Bronze medal	Keenan Simpson	Canada

The men's extreme canoe slalom K-1 competition at the 2019 Pan American Games in Lima took place from 2 to 4 August at the Cañete River in Lunahuaná.

The gold medal was won by Pepe Gonçalves of the Brazil.

== Schedule ==
All times are Local Time (UTC−5).

Date	Time	Round
Friday, 2 August 2019	11:15	Heats
Sunday, 4 August 2019	14:45	Semi-final
Sunday, 4 August 2019	15:59	Final

== Results ==
=== Heats ===
Heat	Rank	Name	Nation	Notes
1	1	Pepe Gonçalves	Brazil	Q
1	2	Keenan Simpson	Canada	Q
1	3	Juan Singuri	Bolivia	DNF
2	1	Matías Contreras	Argentina	Q
2	2	Joshua Joseph	United States	Q
2	3	Antonio Reinoso	Mexico	
3	1	Axel Fonseca	Costa Rica	Q
3	2	Eriberto Gutiérrez	Peru	Q
3	3	Alexis Pérez	Venezuela	
3	4	Andraz Echeverría	Chile	

=== Semifinals ===
Heat	Rank	Name	Nation	Notes
1	1	Matías Contreras	Argentina	Q
1	2	Joshua Joseph	United States	Q
1	3	Eriberto Gutiérrez	Peru	
2	1	Pepe Gonçalves	Brazil	Q
2	2	Keenan Simpson	Canada	Q
2	3	Axel Fonseca	Costa Rica	

=== Final ===
Rank	Name	Nation	Notes
1st place, gold medalist(s)	Pepe Gonçalves	Brazil	
2nd place, silver medalist(s)	Joshua Joseph	United States	
3rd place, bronze medalist(s)	Keenan Simpson	Canada	
4	Matías Contreras	Argentina	
