= Canoeing at the 2019 Pan American Games – Men's slalom K-1 =

Men's canoe slalom K-1 at the 2019 Pan American Games
- Venue: Cañete River, Lunahuaná
- Date: 3-4 August
- Competitors: 10 from 10 nations
- Winning time: 93.70

Medalists
Gold medal	Pepe Gonçalves	Brazil
Silver medal	Lucas Rossi	Argentina
Bronze medal	Keenan Simpson	Canada

The men's canoe slalom K-1 competition at the 2019 Pan American Games in Lima took place between 3 and 4 August at the Cañete River in Lunahuaná.

The gold medal was won by Pepe Gonçalves of the Brazil.

== Schedule ==
All times are Local Time (UTC−5).

Date	Time	Round
Saturday, 3 August 2019	10:08	Heats
Sunday, 4 August 2019	10:02	Semi-final
Sunday, 4 August 2019	11:43	Final

== Results ==
Rank	Name	Preliminary Heats						Semifinal			Final	
Rank	Name	1st Ride	Pen.	2nd Ride	Pen.	Best	Rank	Time	Pen.	Rank	Time	Pen.
1st place, gold medalist(s)	Pepe Gonçalves (BRA)	77.52	0	82.77	6	77.52	1	88.62	2	1	85.81	0
2nd place, silver medalist(s)	Lucas Rossi (ARG)	83.43	2	86.13	4	83.43	3	91.38	4	2	86.23	0
3rd place, bronze medalist(s)	Keenan Simpson (CAN)	88.17	4	85.57	4	85.57	5	95.10	4	5	88.45	0
4	Joshua Joseph (USA)	82.55	2	83.43	2	82.55	2	92.72	4	3	88.53	2
5	Axel Fonseca (CRC)	91.66	8	90.11	6	90.11	7	97.46	4	6	92.33	0
6	Andraz Echeverría (CHI)	86.36	2	85.29	0	85.29	4	93.25	2	4	93.01	2
7	Alexis Pérez (VEN)	102.05	10	89.29	2	89.29	6	99.48	4	7	did not advance	
8	Eriberto Gutiérrez (PER)	93.77	0	145.87	52	93.77	8	did not advance				
9	Antonio Reinoso (MEX)	96.53	0	97.44	2	96.53	9	did not advance				
10	Juan Singuri (BOL)	204.65	64	151.51	2	151.51	10	did not advance				
