= Diving at the 2019 Pan American Games – Men's 10 metre platform =

Men's 10 metre platform at the 2019 Pan American Games
- Venue: Aquatics Centre
- Dates: August 5
- Competitors: 16 from 9 nations
- Winning score: 500.35

Medalists
Gold medal	Kevin Berlin	Mexico
Silver medal	Iván García	Mexico
Bronze medal	Vincent Riendeau	Canada

The men's 10 metre platform competition of the diving events at the 2019 Pan American Games was held on 5 August at the Aquatics Centre in Lima, Peru.

== Schedule ==
Date	Time	Round
August 5, 2019	10:00	Preliminary
August 5, 2019	20:37	Final

== Results ==
Green denotes finalists

Rank	Diver	Nationality	Preliminary		Final	
Rank	Diver	Nationality	Points	Rank	Points	Rank
1st place, gold medalist(s)	Kevin Berlin	Mexico	412.50	8	500.35	1
2nd place, silver medalist(s)	Iván García	Mexico	453.90	2	497.55	2
3rd place, bronze medalist(s)	Vincent Riendeau	Canada	424.85	4	462.70	3
4	Rafael Quintero	Puerto Rico	413.75	7	449.45	4
5	Steele Johnson	United States	468.50	1	448.55	5
6	Nathan Zsombor-Murray	Canada	422.35	5	433.00	6
7	José Ruvalcaba	Dominican Republic	375.85	10	420.00	7
8	Isaac Filho	Brazil	415.70	6	406.45	8
9	Jeinkler Aguirre	Cuba	387.35	9	394.15	9
10	Sebastián Villa	Colombia	437.35	3	392.40	10
11	Kawan Figueredo	Brazil	369.00	11	384.90	11
12	Víctor Ortega	Colombia	358.35	12	374.10	12
13	Benjamin Bramley	United States	355.20	13		
14	Oscar Ariza	Venezuela	332.20	14		
15	Yusmandy Paz	Cuba	317.90	15		
16	Jesus Gonzalez Reyes	Venezuela	264.80	16		
