= Gymnastics at the 2019 Pan American Games – Women's vault =

Women's vault at the 2019 Pan American Games
- Venue: Polideportivo Villa el Salvador
- Dates: July 30
- Competitors: 8 from 5 nations
- Winning score: 14.450

Medalists
Gold medal	Ellie Black	Canada
Silver medal	Yesenia Ferrera	Cuba
Bronze medal	Shallon Olsen	Canada

The women's vault gymnastic event at the 2019 Pan American Games was held on July 30 at the Polideportivo Villa el Salvador.

== Schedule ==
All times are Eastern Standard Time (UTC-3).

Date	Time	Round
July 30, 2019	14:00	Final

== Results ==
=== Final ===
Fourth place qualifier, Aleah Finnegan of the United States, withdrew from the competition due to injury. She was replaced by first reserve, Marcia Vidiaux of Cuba.

Rank	Gymnast	Vault 1				Vault 2				Total
Rank	Gymnast	D Score	E Score	Pen.	Score 1	D Score	E Score	Pen.	Score 2	Total
1st place, gold medalist(s)	Ellie Black (CAN)	5.4	9.100		14.500	5.2	9.200		14.400	14.450
2nd place, silver medalist(s)	Yesenia Ferrera (CUB)	5.4	9.200		14.600	5.2	8.983		14.183	14.391
3rd place, bronze medalist(s)	Shallon Olsen (CAN)	5.4	9.000		14.400	6.0	8.066	0.1	13.849	14.183
4	Ana Palacios (GUA)	5.4	8.433	0.1	13.733	5.2	8.766		13.966	13.849
5	Makarena Pinto (CHI)	5.2	8.800		14.00	5.2	8.400	0.1	13.500	13.750
6	Martina Dominici (ARG)	5.4	8.700		14.100	4.8	8.433		13.233	13.666
7	Marcia Vidiaux (CUB)	5.6	8.566	0.1	14.066	5.8	7.300		13.100	13.583
8	Franchesca Santi (CHI)	5.4	8.333		13.733	4.8	8.500		13.300	13.516

=== Qualification ===
Rank	Gymnast	Vault 1				Vault 2				Total	Qual.
Rank	Gymnast	D Score	E Score	Pen.	Score 1	D Score	E Score	Pen.	Score 2	Total	Qual.
1	Ellie Black (CAN)	5.400	9.150		14.550	5.200	9.100		14.300	14.425	Q
2	Yesenia Ferrera (CUB)	5.400	9.100		14.500	5.200	8.750	0.100	13.850	14.175	Q
3	Martina Dominici (ARG)	5.400	9.200		14.600	4.800	8.900		13.700	14.150	Q
4	Aleah Finnegan (USA)	5.400	9.300		14.700	4.400	9.150		13.550	14.125	Q
5	Shallon Olsen (CAN)	5.400	8.750		14.150	5.200	8.550		13.750	13.950	Q
6	Ana Palacios (GUA)	5.400	9.100	0.300	14.200	5.200	8.750	0.300	13.650	13.925	Q
7	Franchesca Santi (CHI)	5.400	8.650		14.050	4.800	8.800		13.600	13.825	Q
8	Makarena Pinto (CHI)	4.800	8.700		13.500	5.200	8.650		13.850	13.675	Q
9	Marcia Vidiaux (CUB)	5.600	8.700	0.100	14.200	5.800	7.600	0.300	13.100	13.650	R1
10	Yamilet Peña (DOM)	5.400	8.500		13.900	5.400	7.950		13.350	13.625	R2
11	Paula Mejias (PUR)	4.800	8.900		13.700	4.800	8.200		13.000	13.350	R3
