= Naïma Moreira-Laliberté =

Canadian equestrian

Personal information
- Nationality: Canada
- Discipline: Dressage
- Born: October 30, 1996 (age 29); Montreal, Quebec, Canada
Medal record
Equestrian
Representing Canada
Pan American Games
Gold medal – first place	2019 Lima	Team dressage
Bronze medal – third place	2023 Santiago	Team dressage

Naïma Moreira-Laliberté (born October 30, 1996) is a Canadian Equestrian Team athlete in dressage. She was the reigning Pan American Games champion in team dressage, when she won gold in 2019 in Lima with Jill Irving, Tina Irwin, and Lindsay Kellock. In November 2024, she won the Grand Prix Freestyle at the Royal Agricultural Winter Fair, scoring 75.745%.

Moreira-Laliberté was born in Montreal and grew up in Outremont, Quebec. She is the daughter of Canadian businessman Guy Laliberté.

She competed for Canada at the 2024 Summer Olympics, the 2019 Pan American Games, and the 2023 Pan American Games.
