= Lindsay Kellock =

Canadian equestrian (born 1990)

Personal information
- Full name: Lindsay Kellock
- Nationality: Canada
- Discipline: Dressage
- Born: April 22, 1990 (age 35); Toronto, Ontario
Medal record
Equestrian
Representing Canada
Pan American Games
| Gold medal – first place | 2019 Lima | Team dressage |

Lindsay Kellock (born April 22, 1990) is a Canadian Equestrian Team athlete in dressage. She is reigning Pan American Games champion in team dressage, when she won gold in 2019 in Lima with Jill Irving, Tina Irwin, and Naïma Moreira-Laliberté. Kellock was born in Toronto and grew up in Newmarket, Ontario, but currently resides in New York.

Kellock represented Canada at the 2020 Olympic Games in Tokyo with her horse Sebastien. She finished 50th in the individual competition.
