= Taekwondo at the 2019 Pan American Games – Men's poomsae individual =

Men's individual poomsae at the 2019 Pan American Games
- Venue: Polideportivo Callao
- Dates: July 27
- Competitors: 6 from 6 nations
- Winning score: 7.660

Medalists
Gold medal	Alex Lee	United States
Silver medal	Hugo del Castillo	Peru
Bronze medal	Marco Arroyo	Mexico
Bronze medal	Abbas Assadian Jr.	Canada

The men's individual poomsae competition of the taekwondo events at the 2019 Pan American Games took place on July 27 at the Polideportivo Callao.

== Results ==
Position	Athlete	Round 1	Round 2	Total
1st place, gold medalist(s)	Alex Lee (USA)	7.64	7.68	7.660
2nd place, silver medalist(s)	Hugo del Castillo (PER)	7.48	7.49	7.490
3rd place, bronze medalist(s)	Marco Arroyo (MEX)	7.46	7.50	7.480
3rd place, bronze medalist(s)	Abbas Assadian Jr. (CAN)	7.38	7.40	7.390
5	Dany Coy (GUA)	7.28	7.18	7.230
6	Luis M. Colon (PUR)	6.86	6.56	6.710
