= Taekwondo at the 2019 Pan American Games – Mixed poomsae pairs =

Mixed poomsae pairs at the 2019 Pan American Games
- Venue: Polideportivo Callao
- Dates: July 28
- Competitors: 12 from 6 nations
- Winning score: 7.440

Medalists
Gold medal	Leonardo Juarez; Ana Ibanez	Mexico
Silver medal	Jinsu Ha; Michelle Lee	Canada
Bronze medal	Renzo Saux; Ariana Vera	Peru

The mixed poomsae pairs competition of the taekwondo events at the 2019 Pan American Games took place on July 28 at the Polideportivo Callao.

== Results ==
Position	Athletes	Country	Round 1	Round 2	Total
1st place, gold medalist(s)	Leonardo Juarez; Ana Ibanez	Mexico	7.36	7.52	7.440
2nd place, silver medalist(s)	Jinsu Ha; Michelle Lee	Canada	7.34	7.54	7.440
3rd place, bronze medalist(s)	Renzo Saux; Ariana Vera	Peru	6.76	7.26	7.010
4	Ethan Sun; Sae-Jin Yi	United States	6.70	7.14	6.920
5	Hector Morales; Maria Higueros	Guatemala	6.46	6.74	6.660
6	Miguel Rivera; Fabiola Ruiz	Puerto Rico	6.06	6.66	6.360

- Mexico won tiebreak
