= Erynn Ballard =

Canadian equestrian

Personal information
- Born: 13 September 1980 (age 45) Oakville, Ontario, Canada

Sport
- Country: Canada
- Sport: Equestrian
- Event: Show jumping

Achievements and titles
- World finals: Tryon 2018; Herning 2022

Erynn Ballard (born 13 September 1980) is a Canadian show jumping competitor. She represented Canada at the 2019 Pan American Games in Lima, at the 2018 FEI World Equestrian Games in Tryon and the 2022 FEI World Championships in Herning. She took also part in the 2023 World Cup Finals in Omaha.

Ballard has been selected for the 2024 Summer Olympics in Paris to represent the Canadian team, which will be her first appearance at the Olympic Games.
