= Kelly McKee =

Canadian water polo player (born 1992)

Personal information
- Born: 16 June 1992 (age 34) Calgary, Alberta, Canada

Sport
- Sport: Water polo
- College team: Hawaii Rainbow Wahine; California Golden Bears
Medal record
Representing Canada
Pan American Games
Silver medal – second place	2019 Lima	Team

Kelly McKee (born June 16, 1992) is a Canadian water polo player who is a member of the Canada women's national water polo team.

== Career ==
McKee was part of Canada's silver medal winning team at the 2019 Pan American Games in Lima. This qualified the team for the 2020 Summer Olympics.

In June 2021, Walker was named to Canada's 2020 Olympic team.
