= Jill Irving =

Canadian equestrian (born 1963)

Personal information
- Full name: Jill Irving
- Nationality: Canada
- Discipline: Dressage
- Born: April 4, 1963 (age 63); Sudbury, Ontario
- Home town: Moncton, New Brunswick
Medal record
Equestrian
Representing Canada
Pan American Games
Gold medal – first place	2019 Lima	Team dressage

Jill Irving (née Gougeon, born April 4, 1963) is a Canadian Equestrian Team athlete in dressage. She won a gold medal in team dressage at the 2019 Pan American Games in Lima, Peru. Irving was born in and grew up in Ontario but has resided in Moncton, New Brunswick since her early 20s. Jill was married to industrialist Robert Irving until his death in 2026.

Jill Irving was set to make her Olympic debut at the 2024 Summer Olympics at the age of 61, alongside her horse Delacroix 11, but withdrew prior to the games when the pair was deemed unfit to compete. Irving remained on the Canadian Olympic dressage team as the travelling alternate with her secondary horse Genesis.
