= Keenan Simpson =

Canadian slalom kayaker

Personal information
- Born: 7 January 1999 (age 27)

Sport
- Country: Canada
- Sport: Slalom kayak
Medal record
Men's slalom kayak
Representing Canada
Pan American Games
Bronze medal – third place	2019 Lima	K-1
Bronze medal – third place	2019 Lima	Extreme K-1

Keenan Simpson (born 7 January 1999) is a Canadian slalom kayaker. In 2019, he won the bronze medal in the men's K-1 event at the 2019 Pan American Games held in Lima, Peru. He also won the bronze medal in the men's extreme K-1 event.
