= Argentina at the 2019 Pan American Games =

- IOC code: ARG
- NOC: Comité Olímpico Argentino

in Lima, Peru 26 July–11 August 2019
- Competitors: 519 in 42 sports
- Flag bearers: Javier Conte (opening); Delfina Pignatiello (closing)
- Medals Ranked 5th: Gold 33 Silver 34 Bronze 34 Total 101

Pan American Games appearances (overview)
- 1951; 1955; 1959; 1963; 1967; 1971; 1975; 1979; 1983; 1987; 1991; 1995; 1999; 2003; 2007; 2011; 2015; 2019; 2023; 2027

Argentina competed in the 2019 Pan American Games in Lima, Peru from July 26 to August 11, 2019.

On May 24, 2019, sailor Javier Conte was named as the country's flag bearer during the opening ceremony.

One of the most successful Argentina participations in the history of Pan American Games, the country crossed the mark of 100 medals for first time since 1995 Games which they hosted. It was also the third time to do so and the first to do in a Games which they didn't host. The 33-gold medal tally was the third highest for Argentina in the history, just only being surpassed by the 1951 and 1995 performances.

== Competitors ==
The following is the list of number of competitors (per gender) participating at the games per sport/discipline.

Sport	Men	Women	Total
Archery	3	3	6
Artistic swimming	—N/a	2	2
Athletics	10	11	21
Badminton	1	1	2
Baseball	24	0	24
Basketball	16	16	32
Basque pelota	7	6	13
Bodybuilding	0	1	1
Bowling	2	2	4
Boxing	2	2	4
Canoeing	10	8	18
Cycling	9	8	17
Equestrian	9	2	11
Fencing	9	9	18
Field hockey	16	16	32
Football	18	18	36
Golf	2	2	4
Gymnastics	5	7	12
Handball	14	14	28
Judo	4	4	8
Karate	5	2	7
Modern pentathlon	3	3	6
Racquetball	2	2	4
Roller sports	3	3	6
Rowing	17	5	22
Rugby sevens	12	12	24
Sailing	10	7	17
Shooting	9	7	16
Softball	15	0	15
Squash	3	3	6
Surfing	5	5	10
Swimming	10	7	17
Table tennis	3	3	6
Taekwondo	2	3	5
Tennis	3	3	6
Triathlon	2	2	4
Volleyball	14	14	28
Water polo	11	0	11
Water skiing	3	3	6
Weightlifting	1	4	5
Wrestling	4	1	5
Total	298	221	519

== Medalists ==
Medal	Name	Sport	Event	Date
Gold	Lucas Guzmán	Taekwondo	Men's 58 kg	27 July
Gold	Juan Sánchez	Roller sports	Men's free skating	27 July
Gold	Argentina national rugby sevens team: Santiago Álvarez; Lautaro Bazán; Felipe del Mestre; Luciano González Rizzoni; Fernando Luna; Santiago Mare; Matías Osadczuk; Gastón Revol; Franco Sábato; Germán Schulz; Francisco Ulloa; Tomás Vanni	Rugby sevens	Men's tournament	28 July
Gold	Juan Ignacio Cáceres; Gonzalo Carreras; Ezequiel Di Giacomo; Manuel Lascano	Canoeing	Men's K-4 500 metres	28 July
Gold	Eugenia De Armas	Water skiing	Women's wakeboard	29 July
Gold	Manuel Lascano; Agustín Vernice	Canoeing	Men's K-1 1000 metres	29 July
Gold	Agustín Vernice	Canoeing	Men's K-2 1000 metres	29 July
Gold	Sabrina Ameghino	Canoeing	Women's K-1 200 metres	30 July
Gold	Argentina men's national softball team: Santiago Carril; Federico Eder; Gustavo Godoy; Manuel Godoy; Román Godoy; Juan Malarczuk; Huemul Mata; Teo Migliavacca; Mariano Montero; Bruno Motroni; Gonzalo Ojeda; Alan Peker; Juan Potolicchio; Gian Scialacomo; Juan Zara	Softball	Men's tournament	1 August
Gold	Leonela Sánchez	Boxing	Women's Bantamweight	1 August
Gold	Julián Gutiérrez; Fernanda Russo	Shooting	Mixed pairs 10 meter air rifle	3 August
Gold	Nadia Podoroska	Tennis	Women's singles	4 August
Gold	Argentina national basketball team: Nicolás Brussino; Agustín Caffaro; Facundo Campazzo; Gabriel Deck; Marcos Delía; Máximo Fjellerup; Tayavek Gallizzi; Patricio Garino; Nicolás Laprovíttola; Lucio Redivo; Luis Scola; Luca Vildoza	Basketball	Men's tournament	4 August
Gold	Argentina men's national volleyball team: Manuel Balague; Nicolás Bruno; Gastón Fernández; Joaquín Gallego; Matías Giraudo; Facundo Imhoff; German Johansen; Jan Martínez; Franco Massimino; Luciano Palonsky; Matías Sánchez; Lisandro Zanotti	Volleyball	Men's tournament	4 August
Gold	Argentina men's national handball team: Santiago Baronetto; Nicolás Bonanno; Gonzalo Carou; Federico Fernández; Marcos Fischer; Leonel Maciel; Lucas Moscariello; Federico Pizarro; Ignacio Pizarro; Matías Schulz; Diego Simonet; Pablo Simonet; Sebastián Simonet; Pablo Vainstein	Handball	Men's tournament	5 August
Gold	Virginia Bardach	Swimming	Women's 200 metre butterfly	6 August
Gold	Delfina Pignatiello	Swimming	Women's 400 metre freestyle	6 August
Gold	Rodrigo Murillo; Cristian Rosso	Rowing	Men's double sculls	8 August
Gold	Iván Carino; Agustín Díaz; Francisco Esteras; Axel Haack	Rowing	Men's coxless four	8 August
Gold	Delfina Pignatiello	Swimming	Women's 800 metre freestyle	8 August
Gold	Rodrigo Murillo; Brian Rosso; Santiago Rosso; Ariel Suárez	Rowing	Men's quadruple sculls	9 August
Gold	Argentina women's national field hockey team: Agustina Albertario; Agostina Alonso; Noel Barrionuevo; Valentina Costa Biondi; Silvina D'Elía; María José Granatto; Victoria Granatto; Julieta Jankunas; Giselle Kañevsky; Rosario Luchetti; Carla Rebecchi; Micaela Retegui; Victoria Sauze; Belén Succi; Sofía Toccalino; Eugenia Trinchinetti	Field hockey	Women's tournament	9 August
Gold	Bautista Saubidet Birkner	Sailing	Men's RS:X	9 August
Gold	María Eugenia González Briozzo; Iván Nikolajuk	Archery	Mixed team compound	10 August
Gold	Pablo Fusto; Alfredo Villegas	Basque pelota	Men's doubles fronton leather ball	10 August
Gold	Santiago Andreasen; Sebastián Andreasen	Basque pelota	Men's doubles trinquete rubber ball	10 August
Gold	Lis García; Cynthia Pinto	Basque pelota	Women's doubles trinquete rubber ball	10 August
Gold	Maximiliano Richeze	Cycling	Men's road race	10 August
Gold	Argentina men's national field hockey team: Agustín Bugallo; Maico Casella; Nicolás Cicileo; Federico Fernández; Martín Ferreiro; Pedro Ibarra; Nicolás Keenan; Juan Martín López; Lucas Martínez; Agustín Mazzilli; Ignacio Ortiz; Matías Paredes; Matías Rey; Leandro Tolini; Lucas Vila; Juan Manuel Vivaldi	Field hockey	Men's tournament	10 August
Gold	Argentina national under-23 football team: Ignacio Aliseda; Aaron Barquett; Facundo Cambeses; Santiago Colombatto; Juan Pablo Cozzani; Nicolás Demartini; Adolfo Gaich; Nicolás González; Marcelo Herrera; Sebastián Lomonaco; Facundo Medina; Aníbal Moreno; Leonel Mosevich; Lucas Necul; Joaquín Novillo; Agustín Urzi; Carlos Valenzuela; Fausto Vera	Football	Men's tournament	10 August
Gold	Iván Carino; Agustín Díaz; Francisco Esteras; Axel Haack; Tomás Herrera; Joel Infante; Ariel Suárez; Joel Romero; Agustín Scenna	Rowing	Men's eight	10 August
Gold	Javier Conte; Ignacio Giammona; Paula Salerno	Sailing	Lightning	10 August
Gold	Delfina Pignatiello	Swimming	Women's 1500 metre freestyle	10 August
Silver	Giselle Soler	Roller sports	Women's free skating	27 July
Silver	Sofía Gómez	Cycling	Women's cross-country	28 July
Silver	Argentina women's national 3x3 team: Andrea Boquete; Melisa Gretter; Victoria Llorente; Natacha Pérez	Basketball	Women's 3x3 tournament	29 July
Silver	Argentina women's national handball team: Camila Bonazzola; Nadia Bordon; Rocío Campigli; Marisol Carratu; Micaela Casasola; Victoria Crivelli; Malena Cavo; Macarena Gandulfo; Elke Karsten; Antonela Mena; Luciana Mendoza; Manuela Pizzo; Macarena Sans; Rosario Urban	Handball	Women's tournament	30 July
Silver	Ana Gallay; Fernanda Pereyra	Beach volleyball	Women's tournament	30 July
Silver	Magdalena Garro; Brenda Rojas	Canoeing	Women's K-2 500 metres	30 July
Silver	Ulf Ditsch	Water skiing	Men's wakeboard	30 July
Silver	Dayana Sánchez	Boxing	Women's Lightweight	2 August
Silver	Guido Andreozzi; Facundo Bagnis	Tennis	Men's doubles	3 August
Silver	Cecilia Biagioli	Swimming	Women's marathon 10 kilometres	4 August
Silver	Nadia Riquelme	Canoeing	Women's slalom K-1	4 August
Silver	Lucas Rossi	Canoeing	Men's slalom K-1	4 August
Silver	Sebastián Rossi	Canoeing	Men's slalom C-1	4 August
Silver	Leandro Usuna	Surfing	Men's open surf	4 August
Silver	Gastón Alto; Horacio Cifuentes	Table tennis	Men's doubles	6 August
Silver	María Belén Pérez Maurice	Fencing	Women's sabre	6 August
Silver	Julia Sebastián	Swimming	Women's 100 metre breaststroke	6 August
Silver	Pascual Di Tella	Fencing	Men's sabre	7 August
Silver	María José Vargas	Racquetball	Women's singles	7 August
Silver	José Felix Domínguez; Jesús Lugones; Alessandro Taccani	Fencing	Men's team épée	8 August
Silver	José María Larocca	Equestrian	Individual jumping	9 August
Silver	Argentina women's national football team: Agustina Barroso; Micaela Cabrera; Gabriela Chávez; Aldana Cometti; Mariela Coronel; Vanina Correa; Virginia Gómez; Dalila Ippólito; Natalie Juncos; Mariana Larroquette; Miriam Mayorga; Milagros Menéndez; Yael Oviedo; Solana Pereyra; Yamila Rodríguez; Adriana Sachs; Vanesa Santana; Eliana Stábile	Football	Women's tournament	9 August
Silver	Alejandro Colomino; Carlo Lauro	Rowing	Men's lightweight double sculls	9 August
Silver	Klaus Lange; Yago Lange	Sailing	Laser	9 August
Silver	Eugenia Bosco; Mateo Majdalani	Sailing	Nacra 17	9 August
Silver	Celia Tejerina	Sailing	Women's RS:X	9 August
Silver	Virginia Bardach	Swimming	Women's 400 metre individual medley	9 August
Silver	Facundo Andreasen	Basque pelota	Men's individual fronton rubber ball	10 August
Silver	Guillermo Osorio	Basque pelota	Men's individual Peruvian fronton	10 August
Silver	Natalia Méndez; María José Vargas	Racquetball	Women's team	10 August
Silver	Milka Kraljev	Rowing	Women's lightweight single sculls	10 August
Silver	Gastón Alto; Horacio Cifuentes; Pablo Tabachnik	Table tennis	Men's team	10 August
Silver	José Torres	Cycling	Men's BMX freestyle	11 August
Bronze	Robertino Pezzota	Squash	Men's singles	27 July
Bronze	Luciano Taccone	Triathlon	Men's competition	27 July
Bronze	Sabrina Ameghino; Magdalena Garro; Micaela Maslein; Brenda Rojas	Canoeing	Women's K-4 500 metres	28 July
Bronze	Sergio Villamayor	Modern pentathlon	Men's individual	28 July
Bronze	Sergio Villamayor; Emmanuel Zapata	Modern pentathlon	Men's relay	29 July
Bronze	Julián Azaad; Nicolás Capogrosso	Beach volleyball	Men's tournament	30 July
Bronze	Ramón Quiroga	Boxing	Men's flyweight	30 July
Bronze	Rubén Rézola	Canoeing	Men's K-1 200 metres	30 July
Bronze	Federico Molinari	Gymnastics	Men's rings	30 July
Bronze	Tobías Giorgis	Water skiing	Men's overall	30 July
Bronze	Fernanda Russo	Shooting	Women's 10 metre air rifle	1 August
Bronze	Julián Gutiérrez	Shooting	Men's 10 metre air rifle	2 August
Bronze	Leandro Bottasso	Cycling	Men's keirin	4 August
Bronze	Ornella Pellizzari	Surfing	Women's open surf	4 August
Bronze	Guido Andreozzi	Tennis	Men's singles	4 August
Bronze	Natalia Méndez	Racquetball	Women's singles	6 August
Bronze	Natalia Méndez; María José Vargas	Racquetball	Women's doubles	6 August
Bronze	Isabel Di Tella	Fencing	Women's épée	7 August
Bronze	Milka Kraljev; Oriana Ruiz	Rowing	Women's double sculls	8 August
Bronze	Virginia Bardach (Heats); Andrea Berrino (Final); Federico Grabich (Final); Santiago Grassi (Final); Florencia Perotti (Heats); Lautaro Rodríguez (Heats); Julia Sebastián (Final); Rodrigo Strelkov (Final)	Swimming	Mixed 4 x 100 metre medley relay	8 August
Bronze	Julia Sebastián	Swimming	Women's 200 metre breaststroke	8 August
Bronze	Jorge Alberdi; Guillermo Osorio	Basque pelota	Men's doubles frontenis	9 August
Bronze	Sabrina Andrade; Melina Spahn	Basque pelota	Women's doubles fronton rubber ball	9 August
Bronze	Melina Spahn	Basque pelota	Women's individual Peruvian fronton	9 August
Bronze	Federico Villegas	Cycling	Men's BMX racing	9 August
Bronze	Sebastián González; Luca Impagnatiello; Martín Juiz	Karate	Men's team kata	9 August
Bronze	Agustín Díaz; Axel Haack	Rowing	Men's coxless pair	9 August
Bronze	Lucía Falasca	Sailing	Laser radial	9 August
Bronze	Belén Casetta	Athletics	Women's 3000 metres steeplechase	10 August
Bronze	Brian Rosso	Rowing	Men's single sculls	10 August
Bronze	María Sol Branz; Victoria Travascio	Sailing	49erFX	10 August
Bronze	Guido Buscaglia (Heats); Nicolás Deferrari (Heats); Federico Grabich (Final); Santiago Grassi (Final); Agustín Hernández (Final); Gabriel Morelli (Final)	Swimming	Men's 4 × 100 metre medley relay	10 August
Bronze	Agustina Roth	Cycling	Women's BMX freestyle	11 August
Bronze	Argentina women's national volleyball team: Tanya Acosta; Daniela Bulaich; Antonela Fortuna; Lucía Fresco; Valentina Galiano; Candelaria Herrera; Julieta Lazcano; Victoria Mayer; Agnes Michel; Yamila Nizetich; Tatiana Rizzo; Elina Rodríguez	Volleyball	Women's tournament	11 August

Medals by sport
Sport	1st place, gold medalist(s)	2nd place, silver medalist(s)	3rd place, bronze medalist(s)	Total
Swimming	4	3	3	10
Canoeing	4	4	2	10
Rowing	4	2	3	9
Basque pelota	3	2	3	8
Sailing	2	3	2	7
Field hockey	2	0	0	2
Cycling	1	2	3	6
Boxing	1	1	1	3
Tennis	1	1	1	3
Water skiing	1	1	1	3
Basketball	1	1	0	2
Football	1	1	0	2
Handball	1	1	0	2
Roller sports	1	1	0	2
Shooting	1	0	2	3
Volleyball	1	0	1	2
Archery	1	0	0	1
Rugby sevens	1	0	0	1
Softball	1	0	0	1
Taekwondo	1	0	0	1
Fencing	0	3	1	4
Racquetball	0	2	2	4
Table tennis	0	2	0	2
Beach volleyball	0	1	1	2
Surfing	0	1	1	2
Equestrian	0	1	0	1
Modern pentathlon	0	0	2	2
Athletics	0	0	1	1
Gymnastics	0	0	1	1
Karate	0	0	1	1
Squash	0	0	1	1
Triathlon	0	0	1	1
Total	33	33	34	100

Medals by day
Day	1st place, gold medalist(s)	2nd place, silver medalist(s)	3rd place, bronze medalist(s)	Total
27 July	2	1	2	5
28 July	2	1	2	5
29 July	3	1	1	5
30 July	1	4	5	10
1 August	2	0	1	3
2 August	0	1	1	2
3 August	1	1	0	2
4 August	3	6	3	11
5 August	1	0	0	1
6 August	2	3	2	6
7 August	0	2	2	3
8 August	3	1	3	7
9 August	3	6	7	13
10 August	10	5	4	19
11 August	0	1	2	3
Total	33	33	34	100

== Archery ==
Men

Athlete	Event	Ranking Round		Round of 32	Round of 16	Quarterfinals	Semifinals	Final / BM	Rank
Athlete	Event	Score	Seed	Opposition Score	Opposition Score	Opposition Score	Opposition Score	Opposition Score	Rank
Mario Jajarabilla	Individual recurve	658	14	M Costa (BRA); W 6–4	J Williams (USA); L 3–7	did not advance			
Kevin Sábado	Individual recurve	585	32	B Ellison (USA); L 0–6	did not advance				
Iván Nikolajuk	Individual compound	704	5	Bye	D Muñoz (COL); L 144–148	did not advance			

Women

Athlete	Event	Ranking Round		Round of 32	Round of 16	Quarterfinals	Semifinals	Final / BM	Rank
Athlete	Event	Score	Seed	Opposition Score	Opposition Score	Opposition Score	Opposition Score	Opposition Score	Rank
Florencia Leithold	Individual recurve	629	11	M Pinto (CAN); W 7–1	K Lorig (USA); L 0–6	did not advance			
Gisela Yubrin	Individual recurve	607	21	A dos Santos (BRA); L 3–7	did not advance				
María Eugenia González Briozzo	Individual compound	682	7	—N/a	M Zebadúa (GUA); W 142–137	A Mendoza (VEN); W 143–140	A Becerra (MEX); L 141–143	Bronze medal final P Pearce (USA); L 143–149	4

Mixed

Athlete	Event	Ranking Round		Round of 16	Quarterfinals	Semifinals	Final / BM	Rank
Athlete	Event	Score	Seed	Opposition Score	Opposition Score	Opposition Score	Opposition Score	Rank
Mario Jajarabilla; Gisela Yubrin	Mixed team recurve	1286	7	E Malave (VEN); M Méndez (VEN); W 5–1	A Alvarado (MEX); A Valencia (MEX); L 0–6	did not advance		
María Eugenia González Briozzo; Iván Nikolajuk	Mixed team compound	1386	4	—N/a	Cintrón (PUR); J Pizarro (PUR); W 153–153 (1–0)	S López (COL); D Muñoz (COL); W 157–154	J del Cid Carrillo (GUA); M Zebadúa (GUA); W 153–152	1st place, gold medalist(s)

== Artistic swimming ==
Argentina qualified a total of two athletes.

Athlete	Event	Technical Routine		Free Routine		Total	
Athlete	Event	Points	Rank	Points	Rank	Points	Rank
Camila Arregui; Trinidad López	Duet	75.1817	6	77.6667	6	152.8484	6

== Athletics ==
Men

Track & road events

Athlete	Event	Heat		Semifinal		Final	
Athlete	Event	Time	Rank	Time	Rank	Time	Rank
Federico Bruno	1500 m	—N/a				3:43.17	5
Diego Lacamoire	1500 m	—N/a				3:45.36	9
Federico Bruno	5000 m	—N/a				13:55.75	4
Guillermo Ruggeri	400 m hurdles	—N/a		49.97	3 Q	49.55	5
Miguel Ángel Barzola	Marathon	—N/a				2:17:18	9
Mariano Mastromarino	Marathon	—N/a				2:20:15	13
Juan Manuel Cano	20 km walk	—N/a				1:26:42	10

Field events

Athlete	Event	Result	Rank
Maximiliano Díaz	Triple jump	15.97	10
Carlos Layoy	High jump	2.10	11
Germán Chiaraviglio	Pole vault	5.51	5
Joaquín Gómez	Hammer throw	73.92	5

Women

Track & road events

Athlete	Event	Heat		Semifinal		Final	
Athlete	Event	Time	Rank	Time	Rank	Time	Rank
Victoria Woodward	100 m	—N/a		12.01	6	did not advance	
Noelia Martínez	400 m	—N/a		53.96	7	did not advance	
Fiorella Chiappe	400 m hurdles	—N/a		1:01.42	11	did not advance	
Florencia Borelli	1500 m	—N/a				4:22.50	10
Florencia Borelli	5000 m	—N/a				16:07.75	9
Fedra Luna	5000 m	—N/a				16:14.51	10
Belén Casetta	3000 m steeplechase	—N/a				9:44.46	3rd place, bronze medalist(s)
Valeria Barón; María Ayelén Diogo; Fiorella Chiappe; Noelia Martínez	4 × 400 m relay	—N/a				3:41.39	8
María Luján Urrutia	Marathon	—N/a				2:50:09	13

Field events

Athlete	Event	Result	Rank
Ailén Armada	Discus throw	51.30	11
Jennifer Dahlgren	Hammer throw	63.22	10

== Badminton ==
Argentina qualified a team of two badminton athletes (one per gender).

=== Singles ===
Athlete	Event	Round of 64	Round of 32	Round of 16	Quarter-finals	Semi-finals	Final / BM	
Athlete	Event	Opposition Score	Opposition Score	Opposition Score	Opposition Score	Opposition Score	Opposition Score	Rank
Nicolás Oliva	Men	Bye	Guerrero (CUB); L 8–21, 16–21	Did not advance				17
Iona Gualdi	Women	Bye	Oropeza (CUB); L 5–21, 12–21	Did not advance				17

=== Doubles ===
Athlete	Event	Round of 32	Round of 16	Quarter-finals	Semi-finals	Final / BM	
Athlete	Event	Opposition Score	Opposition Score	Opposition Score	Opposition Score	Opposition Score	Rank
Nicolás Oliva; Iona Gualdi	Mixed	Mini / Nishimura (PER); L 16–21, 11–21	Did not advance				17

== Baseball ==
Argentina qualified a men's team of 24 athletes by winning the 2018 South American Championships. This marked the first time the country qualified for the sport at the Pan American Games. The previous two times Argentina competed, it was because it was awarded a host spot in 1951 and 1995.

Group B

	GP	W	L	RS	RA	DIFF
Canada	3	3	0	28	9	+19
Colombia	3	2	1	13	13	0
Cuba	3	1	2	17	14	+3
Argentina	3	0	3	2	24	−22

Qualified for the Super round

July 29; 15:05	Argentina	0–10 (F/8)	Canada	Baseball Stadium, Lima; Attendance: 2,355
July 29; 15:05		Boxscore		Baseball Stadium, Lima; Attendance: 2,355

July 30; 15:05	Colombia	4–2	Argentina	Baseball Stadium, Lima; Attendance: 1,560
July 30; 15:05		Boxscore		Baseball Stadium, Lima; Attendance: 1,560

July 31; 15:05	Cuba	10–0 (F/7)	Argentina	Baseball Stadium, Lima; Attendance: 987
July 31; 15:05		Boxscore		Baseball Stadium, Lima; Attendance: 987

Seventh place match

August 2; 10:05	Peru	1–20 (F/5)	Argentina	Baseball Stadium, Lima; Attendance: 1,125
August 2; 10:05		Boxscore		Baseball Stadium, Lima; Attendance: 1,125

== Basketball ==
=== 5x5 ===
Summary

Team	Event	Preliminary round				Semifinal	Final / BM / Pl.	
Team	Event	Opposition Result	Opposition Result	Opposition Result	Rank	Opposition Result	Opposition Result	Rank
Argentina men	Men's tournament	Uruguay; W 102–65	Dominican Republic; W 102–97	Mexico; L 64–72	1 Q	United States; W 114–75	Puerto Rico; W 84–66	1st place, gold medalist(s)
Argentina women	Women's tournament	United States; L 62–70	Colombia; L 0–20	Virgin Islands; W 73–59	3	Did not advance	Fifth place match Canada; W 59–54	5

==== Men's tournament ====
Preliminary round

Team	Pld	W	L	PF	PA	PD	Pts	Qualification
Argentina	3	2	1	268	234	+34	5	Qualified for the Semifinals
Dominican Republic	3	2	1	245	220	+25	5	Qualified for the Semifinals
Uruguay	3	1	2	194	246	−52	4	
Mexico	3	1	2	194	201	−7	4	

31 July 2019
18:00

Report

Argentina	102–65	Uruguay
Scoring by quarter: 27–2, 24–15, 22–27, 29–21
Pts: Deck 23; Rebs: Scola 8 Asts: Scola 4		Pts: Parodi 11; Rebs: Four players 3 Asts: Parodi, Rodríguez, Wachsmann 2

Coliseo Eduardo Dibos, Lima
Referees: Steven Anderson (USA)

1 August 2019
13:30

Report

Dominican Republic	97–102 (OT)	Argentina
Scoring by quarter: 18–21, 19–22, 18–23, 32–21, Overtime: 10–15
Pts: De León 21; Rebs: Montero 8 Asts: Montero 3		Pts: Deck 24; Rebs: Campazzo, Deck 6 Asts: Campazzo 7

Coliseo Eduardo Dibos, Lima
Referees: Jorge Vázquez (PUR)

2 August 2019
13:30

Report

Mexico	72–64	Argentina
Scoring by quarter: 10–20, 17–15, 24–20, 21–9
Pts: Estrada 18; Rebs: Gutiérrez 8 Asts: Estrada, Machado, Velis 2		Pts: Deck 13; Rebs: Fjellerup 7 Asts: Brussino 3

Coliseo Eduardo Dibos, Lima
Referees: Luis Vazquez (PUR)

Semifinal

3 August 2019
21:00

Report

Argentina	114–75	United States
Scoring by quarter: 29–18, 32–18, 30–20, 23–19
Pts: Deck 23; Rebs: Brussino 8 Asts: Campazzo 5		Pts: Duke 16; Rebs: Reeves 6 Asts: Gillespie 5

Coliseo Eduardo Dibos, Lima
Referees: Cristiano Maranho (BRA)

Gold medal match

4 August 2019
21:00

Report

Puerto Rico	66–84	Argentina
Scoring by quarter: 18–27, 12–13, 20–20, 16–24
Pts: Collier 19; Rebs: Collier 12; Asts: Soto 3		Pts: Scola 28; Rebs: Scola 9 Asts: Campazzo 12

Coliseo Eduardo Dibos, Lima
Referees: Cristiano Maranho (BRA)

==== Women's tournament ====
Preliminary round

Team	Pld	W	L	PF	PA	PD	Pts	Qualification
United States	3	3	0	248	180	+68	6	Qualified for the Semifinals
Colombia	3	2	1	152	141	+11	5	Qualified for the Semifinals
Argentina	3	1	2	135	149	−14	3 (Note: Argentina did not receive a point for the forfeit loss to Colombia.)	
Virgin Islands	3	0	3	180	245	−65	3	

Notes:

6 August 2019
21:00

Report

United States	70–62	Argentina
Scoring by quarter: 23–16, 10–18, 18–13, 19–15
Pts: Carter 14; Rebs: Onyenwere 12; Asts: Harris, Carter 2		Pts: Boquete, González 14; Rebs: Burani 8 Asts: Gretter 8

Coliseo Eduardo Dibos, Lima
Referees: Michael Weiland (CAN)

7 August 2019
13:30

Report

Argentina	0–20 (forfeit)	Colombia

Coliseo Eduardo Dibos, Lima
Referees: Daniel García (VEN)

8 August 2019
10:30

Report

Argentina	73–59	Virgin Islands
Scoring by quarter: 19–19, 19–11, 17–18, 18–11
Pts: Llorente 19; Rebs: Llorente 8 Asts: Gretter 5		Pts: George 32; Rebs: George 14; Asts: Tate 3

Coliseo Eduardo Dibos, Lima
Referees: Jorge Vázquez (PUR)

Fifth place match

9 August 2019
13:30

Report

Canada	54–59	Argentina
Scoring by quarter: 9–17, 14–8, 8–20, 23–14
Pts: Pellington 18; Rebs: Hamblin 12; Asts: Scott 2		Pts: Boquete 18; Rebs: Burani, Santana 9 Asts: Gretter 11

Coliseo Eduardo Dibos, Lima
Referees: Cristiano Maranho (BRA)

=== 3x3 ===
Summary

Team	Event	Preliminary round						Semifinal	Final / BM / Pl.	
Team	Event	Opposition Result	Opposition Result	Opposition Result	Opposition Result	Opposition Result	Rank	Opposition Result	Opposition Result	Rank
Argentina men	Men's tournament	Puerto Rico; L 12–21	Venezuela; L 20–21	Puerto Rico; L 18–20	United States; W 22–20	Brazil; L 13–18	6	Did not advance	Fifth place match Venezuela; L 16–21	6
Argentina women	Women's tournament	United States; L 15–21	Dominican Republic; W 12–10	Uruguay; W 19–13	Brazil; W 16–13	Venezuela; W 14–11	2 Q	Dominican Republic; W 21–8	United States; L 17–21	2nd place, silver medalist(s)

==== Men's tournament ====
Preliminary round

Pos	Team	Pld	W	L	PF	PA	PD	Qualification
1	Puerto Rico	5	5	0	104	70	+34	Semifinals
2	Brazil	5	3	2	101	91	+10	Semifinals
3	United States	5	2	3	99	89	+10	Semifinals
4	Dominican Republic	5	2	3	81	98	−17	Semifinals
5	Venezuela	5	2	3	85	104	−19	Fifth place match
6	Argentina	5	1	4	86	104	−18	Fifth place match

Source: Report
Rules for classification: 1) Wins; 2) Head-to-head record; 3) Points scored.

27 July 2019
17:00

Report

Puerto Rico	21–12	Argentina
Pts: Matías 10		Pts: Romano 8

Coliseo Eduardo Dibos
Referees: Gonzalo Paz (URU) / Glenn Tuitt (USA)

27 July 2019
19:00

Report

Venezuela	21–20	Argentina
Pts: Carrera 12		Pts: Romano 6

Coliseo Eduardo Dibos
Referees: Ángel Martínez (PUR) / Carolina Zachi (BRA)

28 July 2019
15:30

Report

Argentina	16–21	Dominican Republic
Pts: Massarelli 8		Pts: Núñez 11

Coliseo Eduardo Dibos
Referees: Ángel Martínez (PUR) / Carolina Zachi (BRA)

28 July 2019
18:00

Report

United States	20–22	Argentina
Pts: Jones 12		Pts: Romano 10

Coliseo Eduardo Dibos
Referees: Sonia Maldonado (PUR) / Ángel Martínez (PUR)

28 July 2019
21:00

Report

Argentina	16–21	Brazil
Pts: Ruesga 7		Pts: Weihermann 9

Coliseo Eduardo Dibos
Referees: Kayla Herdman (CAN) / Gonzalo Paz (URU)

Fifth place match

29 July 2019
11:30

Report

Venezuela	21–16	Argentina
Pts: Carrera 11		Pts: Romano 6

Coliseo Eduardo Dibos
Referees: Ángel Martínez (PUR) / Glenn Tuitt (USA)

==== Women's tournament ====
Preliminary round

Pos	Team	Pld	W	L	PF	PA	PD	Qualification
1	United States	5	5	0	102	48	+54	Semifinals
2	Argentina	5	4	1	76	68	+8	Semifinals
3	Dominican Republic	5	3	2	68	73	−5	Semifinals
4	Brazil	5	2	3	76	89	−13	Semifinals
5	Venezuela	5	1	4	72	80	−8	Fifth place match
6	Uruguay	5	0	5	55	91	−36	Fifth place match

Source: Lima 2019
Rules for classification: 1) Wins; 2) Head-to-head record; 3) Points scored.

27 July 2019
15:30

Report

United States	21–15	Argentina
Pts: Ionescu, Hebard 9		Pts: Llorente 8

Coliseo Eduardo Dibos
Referees: Kayla Herdman (CAN) / Gonzalo Paz (URU)

27 July 2019
17:30

Report

Dominican Republic	10–12	Argentina
Pts: Monsac 5		Pts: Boquete 8

Coliseo Eduardo Dibos
Referees: Kayla Herdman (CAN) / Carolina Zachi (BRA)

27 July 2019
21:30

Report

Argentina	19–13	Uruguay
Pts: Llorente 10		Pts: Gayoso 8

Coliseo Eduardo Dibos
Referees: Kayla Herdman (CAN) / Carolina Zachi (BRA)

28 July 2019
16:30

Report

Brazil	13–16	Argentina
Pts: Silva, Mineiro 4		Pts: 4 players 4

Coliseo Eduardo Dibos
Referees: Kayla Herdman (CAN) / Ángel Martínez (PUR)

28 July 2019
19:30

Report

Argentina	14–11	Venezuela
Pts: Boquete 8		Pts: Wallen 8

Coliseo Eduardo Dibos
Referees: Gonzalo Paz (URU) / Carolina Zachi (BRA)

Semifinal

29 July 2019
9:30

Report

Argentina	21–8	Dominican Republic
Pts: Gretter 8		Pts: Reynoso 4

Coliseo Eduardo Dibos
Referees: Gonzalo Paz (URU) / Carolina Zachi (BRA)

Gold medal game

29 July 2019
13:00

Report

United States	21–17	Argentina
Pts: Ionescu, Hebard 7		Pts: Boquete 5

Coliseo Eduardo Dibos
Referees: Ángel Martínez (PUR) / Carolina Zachi (BRA)

== Basque pelota ==
Men

Athlete	Event	Preliminary round					Semifinal	Final	
Athlete	Event	Opposition Result	Opposition Result	Opposition Result	Opposition Result	Rank	Opposition Result	Opposition Result	Rank
Santiago Andreasen; Sebastián Andreasen	Men's doubles trinquete rubber ball	D García (MEX); I Pérez (MEX); W 15–13, 15–8	M Dominguez (CHI); E Romero (CHI); W 15–1, 15–12	A Bellido (PER); E Velasquez (PER); W 15–5, 15–6	A Guichon (URU); L Rivas (URU); W 15–7, 15–2	1 Q	—N/a	D García (MEX); I Pérez (MEX); W 15–8, 15–6	1st place, gold medalist(s)
Jorge Alberdi; Guillermo Osorio	Men's doubles frontenis	J García Toro (CHI); J González (CHI); W 15–3, 15–7	J López (MEX); L Molina (MEX); L 6–15, 7–15	J Bezada (PER); D Yupanqui (PER); W 15–8, 15–13	O Espinoza (USA); S Espinoza (USA); L 10–15, 7–15	3 Q	—N/a	Bronze medal match J García Toro (CHI); J González (CHI); W 15–6, 15–8	3rd place, bronze medalist(s)
Pablo Fusto; Alfredo Villegas	Men's doubles fronton leather ball	A Chappi (CUB); F Fernández (CUB); W 15–6, 15–9	A Brugues (USA); J Huarte (USA); W 15–8, 15–2	D Fernández (PER); E Velázquez (PER); W 15–6, 15–4	R Ledesma (MEX); M Urrutia (MEX); W 15–10, 15–7	1 Q	—N/a	A Chappi (CUB); F Fernández (CUB); W 15–6, 15–11	1st place, gold medalist(s)
Facundo Andreasen	Men's individual fronton rubber ball	A González (CUB); W 15–14, 15–8	R Carrasco (PER); W 15–7, 15–9	E Segura (ESA); W 15–2, 15–1	M Letelier (CHI); W 15–0, 15–1	1 Q	B Ramírez (URU); W 15–8, 15–0	A Rodríguez (MEX); L 15–12, 9–15, 7–10	2nd place, silver medalist(s)
Guillermo Osorio	Men's individual Peruvian fronton	I Pérez (MEX); W 15–8, 15–7	A González (CUB); W 15–12, 15–4	C Martínez (PER); L 13–15, 9–15	S Espinoza (USA); W 15–9, 15–3	2 Q	—N/a	C Martínez (PER); L 6–15, 11–15	2nd place, silver medalist(s)

Women

Athlete	Event	Preliminary round					Semifinal	Final	
Athlete	Event	Opposition Result	Opposition Result	Opposition Result	Opposition Result	Rank	Opposition Result	Opposition Result	Rank
Lis García; Cynthia Pinto	Women's doubles trinquete rubber ball	Y Allué (CUB); Y Rodríguez (CUB); W 15–8, 15–7	Z Solas (CHI); R Valderrama (CHI); W 15–7, 15–6	—N/a		1 Q	P Castillo (MEX); R Flores (MEX); W 15–10, 15–12	M Miranda (URU); C Naviliat (URU); W 8–15, 15–9, 10–4	1st place, gold medalist(s)
Sabrina Andrade; Melina Spahn	Women's doubles fronton rubber ball	D Figueroa (MEX); L Puentes (MEX); L 2–15, 5–15	D Darriba (CUB); Y Medina (CUB); L 15–6, 8–15, 2–10	J Bernal (PER); M Rodriguez (PER); W 15–6, 15–5	M Bastarrica (CHI); J Dominguez (CHI); W 15–3, 15–7	3 Q	—N/a	Bronze medal match J Bernal (PER); M Rodriguez (PER); W 15–0, 15–2	3rd place, bronze medalist(s)
Lucila Busson; Irina Podverisch	Women's doubles frontenis	A Cepeda (MEX); G Hernandez (MEX); L 2–15, 3–15	M Borges Vega (VEN); D Rangel (VEN); W 9–15, 15–9, 10–8	—N/a		2 Q	L Castillo (CUB); Y Medina (CUB); L 6–15, 8–15	Bronze medal match N Paredes (PER); M Rodriguez (PER); L 11–15, 12–15	4
Melina Spahn	Women's individual Peruvian fronton	R Valderrama (CHI); W 15–4, 15–7	C Suárez (PER); L 9–15, 8–15	D Rangel (VEN); L 14–15, 15–8, 5–10	W Durán (CUB); L 8–15, 12–15	4	—N/a	Bronze medal match D Rangel (VEN); W 15–15, 5–15, 10–9	3rd place, bronze medalist(s)

== Bodybuilding ==
Argentina qualified one female bodybuilder.

Athlete	Event	Pre-judging		Final	
Athlete	Event	Points	Ranking	Points	Ranking
Silvia Rojas	Women's bikini fitness	—N/a		Did not advance	

- There were no results in the pre-judging stage, with only the top six advancing.

== Bowling ==
Athlete	Event	Qualification / Final														Round robin											Semifinal	Final / BM	
Athlete	Event	Block 1						Block 2						Total	Rank	Round robin											Semifinal	Final / BM	
Athlete	Event	1	2	3	4	5	6	7	8	9	10	11	12	Total	Rank	1	2	3	4	5	6	7	8	Total	Grand total	Rank	Opposition Result	Opposition Result	Rank
Jonathan Hocsman	Men's singles	145	190	186	228	206	181	170	226	206	203	224	204	2369	28	Did not advance													
Lucas Legnani	Men's singles	276	215	268	269	183	235	236	237	187	236	243	218	2803	4 Q	225	218	195	200	212	155	212	199	1716	4519	6	did not advance		
Jonathan Hocsman; Lucas Legnani	Men's doubles	357	372	409	498	500	480	452	400	420	477	362	442	5169	10	—N/a													
Gabriela Lanzavecchia	Women's singles	154	166	192	180	212	184	194	226	201	149	144	191	2193	26	Did not advance													
Vanesa Rinke	Women's singles	175	197	189	190	183	209	165	202	192	224	163	205	2294	21	Did not advance													
Gabriela Lanzavecchia; Vanesa Rinke	Women's doubles	324	362	383	296	390	389	389	317	362	347	347	413	4319	13	—N/a													

== Boxing ==
Argentina qualified four boxers (two men and two women).

Men

Athlete	Event	Preliminaries	Quarterfinals	Semifinals	Final	Rank
Athlete	Event	Opposition Result	Opposition Result	Opposition Result	Opposition Result	Rank
Ramón Quiroga	Flyweight	—N/a	M Capilla (MEX); W 5–0	R Marte de la Rosa (DOM); L 0–5	Did not advance	3rd place, bronze medalist(s)
Francisco Verón	Middleweight	—N/a	H Carvalho (BRA); L 2–3	did not advance		

Women

Athlete	Event	Preliminaries	Quarterfinals	Semifinals	Final	Rank
Athlete	Event	Opposition Result	Opposition Result	Opposition Result	Opposition Result	Rank
Leonela Sánchez	Bantamweight	—N/a	F Goicochea (PER); W 5–0	Y Arias (COL); W 5–0	J Romeu (BRA); W 4–1	1st place, gold medalist(s)
Dayana Sánchez	Lightweight	—N/a	I Fioleke (CAN); W 3–2	E Falcón (MEX); W 4–1	B Soares (BRA); L 0–5	2nd place, silver medalist(s)

== Canoeing ==
=== Slalom ===
Argentina qualified a total of six slalom athletes (three men and three women).

Athlete	Event	Preliminary round			Heat		Semifinal		Final	
Athlete	Event	Run 1	Run 2	Rank	Time	Rank	Time	Rank	Time	Rank
Sebastián Rossi	Men's C-1	86.35	85.90	2 Q	—N/a		91.71	1 Q	90.80	2nd place, silver medalist(s)
Lucas Rossi	Men's K-1	81.43	86.13	5 Q	—N/a		91.38	2 Q	86.23	2nd place, silver medalist(s)
Matías Contreras	Men's extreme K-1	—N/a				1 Q	—N/a	1 Q	—N/a	4
Carolina Rossi	Women's C-1	105.65	103.01	4 Q	—N/a		118.86	5 Q	112.92	5
Nadia Riquelme	Women's K-1	97.94	101.86	3 Q	—N/a		115.05	4 Q	103.70	2nd place, silver medalist(s)
María Luz Cassini	Women's extreme K-1	—N/a				2 Q	—N/a	1 Q	—N/a	4

=== Sprint ===
Men

Athlete	Event	Heat		Semifinal		Final	
Athlete	Event	Time	Rank	Time	Rank	Time	Rank
Luciano Méndez	C-1 1000 m	4:10.985	3 SF	4:10.009	1 QF	4:11.414	6
Rubén Rézola	K-1 200 m	35.144	1 QF	Bye		35.996	3rd place, bronze medalist(s)
Agustín Vernice	K-1 1000 m	3:34.362	1 QF	Bye		3:31.955	1st place, gold medalist(s)
Agustín Vernice; Manuel Lascano	K-2 1000 m	3:20.426	1 QF	Bye		3:16.641	1st place, gold medalist(s)
Gonzalo Carreras; Manuel Lascano; Juan Cáceres; Ezequiel Di Giacomo	K-4 500 m	—N/a				1:22.106	1st place, gold medalist(s)

Women

Athlete	Event	Heat		Semifinal		Final	
Athlete	Event	Time	Rank	Time	Rank	Time	Rank
Sabrina Ameghino	K-1 200 m	40.751	2 QF	Bye		42.979	1st place, gold medalist(s)
Paulina Contini	K-1 500 m	2:05.926	3 SF	2:01.413	2 QF	2:01.947	6
Magdalena Garro; Brenda Rojas	K-2 500 m	1:46.644	1 QF	Bye		1:46.932	2nd place, silver medalist(s)
Magdalena Garro; Micaela Maslein; Brenda Rojas; Sabrina Ameghino	K-4 500 m	—N/a				1:35.606	3rd place, bronze medalist(s)

Qualification legend: QF – Qualify to final; SF – Qualify to semifinal

== Cycling ==
=== BMX ===
Freestyle

Athlete	Event	Qualification		Final	
Athlete	Event	Points	Rank	Points	Rank
José Torres	Men's	77.42	5	87.33	2nd place, silver medalist(s)
Agustina Roth	Women's	55.08	4	71.00	3rd place, bronze medalist(s)

Racing

Athlete	Event	Ranking round		Quarterfinal		Semifinal		Final	
Athlete	Event	Time	Rank	Points	Rank	Points	Rank	Time	Rank
Gonzalo Molina	Men's	33.224	2	4	1 Q	4	1 Q	did not finish	
Federico Villegas	Men's	34.035	9	7	2 Q	6	2 Q	32.714	3rd place, bronze medalist(s)

=== Mountain biking ===
Athlete	Event	Time	Rank
Jorge Macías	Men's cross-country	1:30:49	6
Catriel Soto	Men's cross-country	1:35:40	15
Agustina Apaza	Women's cross-country	1:33.56	5
Sofía Gómez	Women's cross-country	1:31:06	2nd place, silver medalist(s)

=== Road cycling ===
Men

Athlete	Event	Final	
Athlete	Event	Time	Rank
Tomás Contte	Road race	4:07:15	9
Rubén Ramos	Road race	4:09:27	34
Maximiliano Richeze	Road race	4:06:28	1st place, gold medalist(s)
Rubén Ramos	Time trial	48:09.85	10

Women

Athlete	Event	Final	
Athlete	Event	Time	Rank
Maribel Aguirre	Road race	2:21:17	31
Fiorella Malaspina	Road race	2:20:34	25
Anabel Yapura	Road race	2:19:53	16
Fiorella Malaspina	Time trial	27:49.91	15
Anabel Yapura	Time trial	26:36.69	6

=== Track ===
Madison

Athlete	Event	Points	Rank
Tomás Contte; Maximiliano Richeze	Men's	45	5

Sprint

Athlete	Event	Qualification		Round of 16	Repechage 1	Quarterfinals	Semifinals	Final	
Athlete	Event	Time	Rank	Opposition Time	Opposition Time	Opposition Result	Opposition Result	Opposition Result	Rank
Leandro Bottasso	Men's individual	10.308	10 Q	Wammes (CAN); W	Bye	Canelón (VEN); L	Did not advance	Race for 5th–8th place Fonseca (BRA); Tjon En Fa (SUR); Ramírez (COL)	8
Mariana Díaz Muñoz	Women's individual	12.845	13	did not advance					
Natalia Vera	Women's individual	11.935	10 Q	Gaxiola (MEX); L	Rodriguez (GUA); Cargua (ECU); 2nd place	did not advance			
Mariana Díaz Muñoz; Natalia Vera	Women's team	36.609	4 QB	—N/a				Bronze final Bayona (COL); Gaviria (COL); L	4

Omnium

Athlete	Event	Scratch race		Tempo race		Elimination race		Points race		Total	
Athlete	Event	Rank	Points	Rank	Points	Rank	Points	Rank	Points	Points	Rank
Tomás Contte	Men's	5	32	10	22	6	30	10	3	87	8
Maribel Aguirre	Women's	2	38	8	22	13	16	12	0	76	9

Keirin

Athlete	Event	Heats	Repechage	Final
Athlete	Event	Rank	Rank	Rank
Leandro Bottasso	Men's	4	2 Q	3rd place, bronze medalist(s)
Natalia Vera	Women's	4	2 Q	6

== Equestrian ==
Argentina qualified a full team of 12 equestrians (four per discipline).

=== Dressage ===
Athlete	Horse	Event	Qualification						Grand Prix Freestyle / Intermediate I Freestyle	
Athlete	Horse	Event	Grand Prix / Prix St. Georges		Grand Prix Special / Intermediate I		Total		Grand Prix Freestyle / Intermediate I Freestyle	
Athlete	Horse	Event	Score	Rank	Score	Rank	Score	Rank	Score	Rank
Fiorella Mengani	Assirio d'Atela	Individual	64.441	28	63.588	26	128.029	26	did not advance	
Vera Protzen	Wettkonig	Individual	70.059	8	71.529	5	141.588	7 Q	72.585	9
Luis Zone	Faberge d'Atela	Individual	Eliminated		did not advance					
Fiorella Mengani; Vera Protzen; Luis Zone	As above	Team	Eliminated		did not advance				—N/a	

=== Eventing ===
Athlete	Horse	Event	Dressage		Cross-country		Jumping		Total	
Athlete	Horse	Event	Faults	Rank	Faults	Rank	Faults	Rank	Faults	Rank
Juan Benitez	Espuelas Atila	Individual	40.20	24	14.80	7	8.00	17	63.00	13
Luciano Brunello	Maria Teresa	Individual	39.80	23	26.40	14	8.00	17	74.20	16
Marcelo Rawson	Felicitas Almendro	Individual	43.50	35	64.80	24	8.00	17	131.30	22
Ignacio Zone	Remonta San Jorge	Individual	37.10	19	Eliminated		did not advance			
Juan Benitez; Luciano Brunello; Marcelo Rawson; Ignacio Zone	As above	Team	117.10	6	121.00	5	24.00	7	268.50	5

=== Jumping ===
Athlete	Horse	Event	Qualification								Final					
Athlete	Horse	Event	Round 1		Round 2		Round 3		Total		Round A		Round B		Total	
Athlete	Horse	Event	Faults	Rank	Faults	Rank	Faults	Rank	Faults	Rank	Faults	Rank	Faults	Rank	Faults	Rank
Matías Albarracín	Cannavaro	Individual	10.87	33	13	29	1	7	24.87	24 Q	9	17	2	8	11	12
Carlos Cremona	Quicksilver VA	Individual	10.08	32	13	29	9	23	32.08	28 Q	22	30	did not advance			
Martín Dopazo	Call Again Cevin	Individual	5.39	19	21	40	9	23	35.39	30	did not advance					
José María Larocca	Finn Lente	Individual	2.72	13	4	9	4	9	10.72	11 Q	0	2	1	7	1	2nd place, silver medalist(s)
Matías Albarracín; Carlos Cremona; Martín Dopazo; José María Larocca	As above	Team	18.19	6	30	7	14	5	62.19	5	—N/a					

== Fencing ==
Argentina qualified a full team of 18 fencers (nine men and nine women).

Men

Athlete	Event	Pool round			Round of 16	Quarterfinal	Semifinal	Final	
Athlete	Event	W	L	Rank	Opposition Score	Opposition Score	Opposition Score	Opposition Score	Rank
José Felix Domínguez	Épée	3	2	8 Q	A Schwantes (BRA); L 10–15	did not advance			
Jesús Lugones	Épée	2	3	11 Q	E García Biel (PER); W 15–11	R Limardo (VEN); L 8–15	did not advance		
Nicolás Marino	Foil	1	4	15	did not advance				
Augusto Servello	Foil	3	2	9 Q	H Shimbo (BRA); W 15–7	G Meinhardt (USA); L 8–15	did not advance		
Pascual Di Tella	Sabre	1	4	13	J Polossifakis (CAN); W 15–12	E Dershwitz (USA); W 15–14	H Rodríguez (CUB); W 15–7	D Homer (USA); L 13–15	2nd place, silver medalist(s)
Stefano Lucchetti	Sabre	4	1	5	E Dershwitz (USA); L 9–15	did not advance			
José Felix Domínguez; Jesús Lugones; Alessandro Taccani	Team épée	—N/a				Canada; W 45–23	United States; W 45–38	Cuba; L 33–45	2nd place, silver medalist(s)
Santiago Luccheti; Nicolás Marino; Augusto Servello	Team foil	—N/a				United States; L 12–45	5th–8th place bracket Puerto Rico; W 45–43	5th place final Mexico; W 45–30	5
Pascual Di Tella; Stefano Lucchetti; Matías Ríos	Team sabre	—N/a				Venezuela; L 41–45	5th–8th place bracket Cuba; W 45–41	5th place final Brazil; W 45–25	5

Women

Athlete	Event	Pool round			Round of 16	Quarterfinal	Semifinal	Final	
Athlete	Event	W	L	Rank	Opposition Score	Opposition Score	Opposition Score	Opposition Score	Rank
Isabel Di Tella	Épée	5	0	1 Q	Bye	S Tejeda (MEX); W 15–10	P Piovesan (VEN); L 15–10	Did not advance	3rd place, bronze medalist(s)
Josefina Méndez Bello	Épée	2	3	13	M Doig (PER); L 7–15	did not advance			
Flavia Mormandi	Foil	3	2	8 Q	S van Erven (COL); W 15–6	L Kiefer (USA); L 9–15	did not advance		
Lucia Ondarts	Foil	2	3	13 Q	N Michel (MEX); L 12–15	did not advance			
María Belén Pérez Maurice	Sabre	4	1	4 Q	C Fox-Gitomer (USA); W 15–13	A Tablada (CUB); W 15–12	A Benítez (VEN); W 15–13	A Stone (USA); L 13–15	2nd place, silver medalist(s)
María Alicia Perroni	Sabre	2	3	10 Q	N Botello (MEX); W 15–11	A Stone (USA); L 5–15	did not advance		
Tamara Chwojnik; Isabel Di Tella; Josefina Méndez Bello	Team épée	—N/a				Venezuela; L 37–41	5th–8th place bracket Peru; W 45–36	5th place final Mexico; W 45–36	5
Flavia Mormandi; Lucia Ondarts; María Terni	Team foil	—N/a				Colombia; L 29–45	5th–8th place bracket Cuba; L 19–45	7th place final Peru; W 45–30	7
Florencia García; María Belén Pérez Maurice; María Alicia Perroni	Team sabre	—N/a				Canada; L 33–45	5th–8th place bracket Venezuela; W 39–45	7th place final Peru; W 45–13	7

== Field hockey ==
Argentina qualified a men's and women's team (of 16 athletes each, for a total of 32) by being winning both tournaments at the field hockey at the 2018 South American Games competition.

Summary

Team	Event	Preliminary round				Quarterfinal	Semifinal	Final / BM / Pl.	
Team	Event	Opposition Result	Opposition Result	Opposition Result	Rank	Opposition Result	Opposition Result	Opposition Result	Rank
Argentina men	Men's tournament	Chile; W 5–1	Trinidad and Tobago; W 6–0	Cuba; W 9–0	1 Q	Peru; W 14–1	United States; W 5–0	Canada; W 5–2	1st place, gold medalist(s)
Argentina women	Women's tournament	Uruguay; W 2–0	Canada; W 3–0	Cuba; W 13–1	1 Q	Peru; W 21–0	Chile; W 3–1	Canada; W 5–1	1st place, gold medalist(s)

=== Men's tournament ===
Team roster

Argentina announced their squad on 12 July 2019.

Head Coach: Germán Orozco

No.	Pos.	Player	Date of birth (age)	Caps	Club
1	GK	Juan Manuel Vivaldi	17 July 1979 (aged 40)	264	(Argentina) Banco Provincia
5	DF	Pedro Ibarra (Captain)	11 September 1985 (aged 33)	282	(Argentina) San Fernando
7	FW	Nicolás Keenan	6 May 1997 (aged 22)	7	(Netherlands) Klein Zwitserland
9	FW	Maico Casella	5 June 1997 (aged 22)	49	(Argentina) San Fernando
10	FW	Matías Paredes	1 February 1982 (aged 37)	350	(Argentina) Ducilo
12	FW	Lucas Vila	23 August 1986 (aged 32)	231	(Germany) Mannheimer HC
13	DF	Leandro Tolini	14 March 1990 (aged 29)	48	(Belgium) Gantoise
16	MF	Ignacio Ortiz	26 July 1987 (aged 32)	147	(Argentina) Banco Provincia
17	DF	Juan Martín López	27 May 1985 (aged 34)	288	(Argentina) Banco Provincia
22	DF	Matías Rey	1 December 1984 (aged 34)	194	(Spain) Real Club de Polo
23	FW	Lucas Martínez	17 November 1993 (aged 25)	51	(Netherlands) Oranje-Rood
24	DF	Nicolás Cicileo	1 October 1993 (aged 25)	35	(Netherlands) Klein Zwitserland
26	MF	Agustín Mazzilli	20 June 1989 (aged 30)	212	(Netherlands) Pinoké
28	MF	Federico Fernández	28 February 1992 (aged 27)	27	(Argentina) Ba. Na. De.
30	MF	Agustín Bugallo	23 April 1995 (aged 24)	57	(Argentina) Mitre
32	FW	Martín Ferreiro	21 October 1997 (aged 21)	30	(Argentina) Lomas

Preliminary round

Pos	Team	Pld	W	D	L	GF	GA	GD	Pts	Qualification
1	Argentina	3	3	0	0	20	1	+19	9	Quarter-finals
2	Chile	3	2	0	1	7	5	+2	6	Quarter-finals
3	Cuba	3	1	0	2	3	15	−12	3	Quarter-finals
4	Trinidad and Tobago	3	0	0	3	2	11	−9	0	Quarter-finals

Source: FIH

30 July 2019
10:00

Argentina	5–1	Chile
Tolini 4', 5'; Ferreiro 8'; Martínez 26'; Vila 30'	Report	Becerra 31'

Umpires:
Peter Wright (RSA)
Gus Soteriades (USA)

1 August 2019
16:00

Trinidad and Tobago	0–6	Argentina
	Report	Tolini 3'; Mazzilli 25', 45'; Paredes 29'; Casella 41'; Martínez 49'

Umpires:
Deepak Joshi (IND)
Rodrigo Rivadeneira (PER)

3 August 2019
14:00

Argentina	9–0	Cuba
Tolini 11', 46'; Martínez 15', 42'; Fernandez 40'; Mazzilli 51'; Keenan 53'; Casella 53', 58'	Report

Umpires:
Gus Soteriades (USA)
Benjamin Peters {USA}

Quarterfinal

5 August 2019
13:30

Argentina	14–1	Peru
Tolini 2', 35', 57'; Rey 6'; Ferreiro 13', 60'; Martínez 19'; Paredes 20', 49'; Casella 21', 25', 39', 43', 47'	Report	Diaz Espinosa 30'

Umpires:
Jonathan Altamirano (MEX)
Benjamin Peters (USA)

Semifinal

8 August 2019
15:00

Argentina	5–0	United States
Paredes 5'; Vila 14'; Mazzilli 20'; Casella 45'; Martínez 59'	Report

Umpires:
Tyler Klenk (CAN)
Hugo Romero (PAR)

Gold medal match

10 August 2019
17:15

(gold) Argentina	5–2	Canada (silver)
Tolini 17', 19'; Ferreiro 27'; Casella 40'; Martínez 53'	Report	Tupper 16'; Johnston 60'

Umpires:
Peter Wright (RSA)
Gus Soteriades (USA)

=== Women's tournament ===
The following 16 players were named in the Argentina squad, which was announced on 11 July 2019.

Head Coach: Carlos Retegui

No.	Pos.	Player	Date of birth (age)	Caps	Club
1	GK	Belén Succi	16 October 1985 (aged 33)	226	(Argentina) CASI
2	DF	Sofía Toccalino	20 March 1997 (aged 22)	69	(Argentina) St. Catherine's
25	DF	Silvina D'Elía	25 April 1986 (aged 33)	237	(Argentina) GEBA
27	DF	Noel Barrionuevo	16 May 1984 (aged 35)	320	(Argentina) Newman
32	DF	Valentina Costa Biondi	13 September 1995 (aged 23)	14	(Argentina) San Fernando
4	MF	Rosario Luchetti (C)	4 June 1984 (aged 35)	271	(Argentina) Belgrano
5	MF	Agostina Alonso	1 October 1995 (aged 23)	65	(Argentina) Banco Nación
7	MF	Giselle Kañevsky	4 August 1985 (aged 33)	134	(Argentina) Hacoaj
18	MF	Victoria Sauze	21 July 1991 (aged 28)	60	(Argentina) River Plate
22	MF	Eugenia Trinchinetti	17 July 1997 (aged 22)	82	(Argentina) San Fernando
23	MF	Micaela Retegui	23 April 1996 (aged 23)	18	(Argentina) San Fernando
11	FW	Carla Rebecchi	7 September 1984 (aged 34)	300	(Argentina) Ciudad
15	FW	María Granatto	21 April 1995 (aged 24)	108	(Argentina) Santa Bárbara
19	FW	Agustina Albertarrio	1 January 1993 (aged 26)	143	(Argentina) Lomas
21	FW	Victoria Granatto	9 April 1991 (aged 28)	12	(Argentina) Santa Bárbara
28	FW	Julieta Jankunas	20 January 1999 (aged 20)	79	(Argentina) Ciudad

Reserves:

- Cristina Cosentino (GK)
- Priscila Jardel

Preliminary round

Pos	Team	Pld	W	D	L	GF	GA	GD	Pts	Qualification
1	Argentina	3	3	0	0	18	1	+17	9	Quarter-finals
2	Canada	3	2	0	1	15	3	+12	6	Quarter-finals
3	Uruguay	3	1	0	2	8	8	0	3	Quarter-finals
4	Cuba	3	0	0	3	2	31	−29	0	Quarter-finals

Source: FIH

29 July 2019
10:00

Argentina	2–0	Uruguay
Rebecchi 7'; D'Elía 47'	Report

Umpires:
Amber Church (NZL)
Megan Robertson (CAN)

31 July 2019
16:00

Canada	0–3	Argentina
	Report	D'Elía 5'; Rebecchi 34'; Barrionuevo 56'

Umpires:
Lix Xiaoying (CHN)
Ayanna McClean (TTO)

2 August 2019
14:00

Argentina	13–1	Cuba
M. Granatto 2'; V. Granatto 9'; Barrionuevo 9', 21', 56', 59'; Jankunas 13', 27', 39'; Rebecchi 24', 43', 49'; Luchetti 28'	Report	Milanes 22'

Umpires:
Amber Church (NZL)
Diana Fuentes Castelo (MEX)

Quarterfinal

4 August 2019
09:30

Argentina	21–0	Peru
M. Granatto 3', 18', 26'; Jankunas 10', 32', 45', 55'; Costa 14'; Luchetti 18', 60'; Albertarrio 23', 30', 43'; Alonso 25', 35'; V. Granatto 29', 49', 56'; Retegui 33'; D'Elía 45'; Trinchinetti 47'	Report

Umpires:
Mary Driscoll (USA)
Maria Fuentes Castelo (Mex)

Semifinal

6 August 2019
15:00

Argentina	3–1	Chile
Rebecchi 3'; Jankunas 44', 60'	Report	Krimerman 45'

Umpires:
Ayanna McClean (TTO)
Liu Xiaoying (CHN)

Gold medal match

9 August 2019
17:15

(gold) Argentina	5–1	Canada (silver)
Jankunas 9', 47'; D'Elía 22', 45'; Rebecchi 37'	Report	Wright 32'

Umpires:
Catalina Montesino (CHI)
Mary Driscoll (USA)

== Football ==
Argentina qualified a women's team (of 18 athletes) by finishing in one of the three qualification spots at the 2018 Copa América Femenina. Argentina also qualified a men's team of 18 athletes.

Summary

Team	Event	Group stage				Semifinal	Final / BM / Pl.	
Team	Event	Opposition Result	Opposition Result	Opposition Result	Rank	Opposition Result	Opposition Result	Rank
Argentina men	Men's tournament	Ecuador; W 3–2	Mexico; L 1–2	Panama; W 3–1	2	Uruguay; W 3–0	Honduras; W 4–1	1st place, gold medalist(s)
Argentina women	Women's tournament	Peru; W 3–0	Panama; W 1–0	Costa Rica; D 0–0	2	Paraguay; W 3–0	Colombia; L 1–1 (6–7)	2nd place, silver medalist(s)

=== Men's tournament ===
Argentina qualified a men's team of 18 athletes.

Head coach: Fernando Batista

No.	Pos.	Player	Date of birth (age)	Caps	Goals	Club
1	GK	Facundo Cambeses	9 April 1997 (aged 22)	0	0	(Argentine Football Association) Banfield
12	GK	Juan Pablo Cozzani	9 October 1998 (aged 20)	0	0	(Argentine Football Association) Lanús
2	DF	Leonel Mosevich	4 February 1997 (aged 22)	0	0	(Portuguese Football Federation) Nacional
3	DF	Aaron Barquett	9 March 1999 (aged 20)	0	0	(Argentine Football Association) Argentinos Juniors
4	DF	Marcelo Herrera	3 November 1998 (aged 20)	0	0	(Argentine Football Association) San Lorenzo
6	DF	Joaquín Novillo	19 February 1998 (aged 21)	0	0	(Argentine Football Association) Belgrano
8	DF	Nicolás Demartini	4 November 1999 (aged 19)	0	0	(Argentine Football Association) Temperley
14	DF	Facundo Medina	28 May 1999 (aged 20)	0	0	(Argentine Football Association) Talleres
5	MF	Fausto Vera	26 March 2000 (aged 19)	0	0	(Argentine Football Association) Argentinos Juniors
11	MF	Santiago Colombatto	17 January 1997 (aged 22)	0	0	(Italian Football Federation) Cagliari
15	MF	Aníbal Moreno	13 May 1999 (aged 20)	0	0	(Argentine Football Association) Newell's Old Boys
16	MF	Agustín Urzi	4 May 2000 (aged 19)	0	0	(Argentine Football Association) Banfield
17	MF	Lucas Necul	21 August 1999 (aged 19)	0	0	(Argentine Football Association) Arsenal de Sarandí
7	FW	Carlos Valenzuela	22 April 1997 (aged 22)	0	0	(Argentine Football Association) Barracas Central
9	FW	Adolfo Gaich	26 February 1999 (aged 20)	0	0	(Argentine Football Association) San Lorenzo
10	FW	Nicolás González	6 April 1998 (aged 21)	0	0	(German Football Association) VfB Stuttgart
13	FW	Ignacio Aliseda	14 March 2000 (aged 19)	0	0	(Argentine Football Association) Defensa y Justicia
18	FW	Sebastián Lomonaco	17 September 1998 (aged 20)	0	0	(Argentine Football Association) Godoy Cruz

Group A

Pos	Team	Pld	W	D	L	GF	GA	GD	Pts	Qualification
1	Mexico	3	2	1	0	4	1	+3	7	Knockout stage
2	Argentina	3	2	0	1	7	5	+2	6	Knockout stage
3	Panama	3	0	2	1	2	4	−2	2	Fifth place match
4	Ecuador	3	0	1	2	3	6	−3	1	Seventh place match

Source: Lima 2019
Rules for classification: Tie-breakers
29 July 2019
13:00

Ecuador	2–3	Argentina
Rezabala 75'; Naula 89'	Report	Valenzuela 33'; Gaich 40', 76'

Estadio Universidad San Marcos
Referee: Gustavo Murillo (Colombia)
1 August 2019
13:00

Mexico	2–1	Argentina
Venegas 13' (pen.); Godínez 81' (pen.)	Report	Gaich 39'

Estadio Universidad San Marcos
Referee: Michael Espinoza (Peru)
4 August 2019
10:00

Panama	1–3	Argentina
Aguilar 45'	Report	Gaich 4'; Lomonaco 14'; Valenzuela 80'

Estadio Universidad San Marcos
Referee: Ulises Mereles (Paraguay)

Semifinals

7 August 2019
20:30

Uruguay	0–3	Argentina
	Report	Gaich 6', 85'; Valenzuela 29'

Estadio Universidad San Marcos
Referee: Wagner Magalhães (Brazil)

Gold medal match

10 August 2019
20:30

Honduras	1–4	Argentina
Martínez 42'	Report	Urzi 7'; Valenzuela 58'; Necul 61'; Vera 65'

Estadio Universidad San Marcos
Referee: Gustavo Murillo (Colombia)

=== Women's tournament ===
Head coach: Carlos Borrello

No.	Pos.	Player	Date of birth (age)	Club
1	GK	Vanina Correa	14 August 1983 (aged 35)	(Argentine Football Association) Rosario Central
12	GK	Solana Pereyra	5 April 1999 (aged 20)	(Argentine Football Association) UAI Urquiza
2	DF	Agustina Barroso	20 May 1993 (aged 26)	(Royal Spanish Football Federation) Madrid CFF
6	DF	Aldana Cometti	3 March 1996 (aged 23)	(Royal Spanish Football Federation) Sevilla
13	DF	Virginia Gómez	26 February 1991 (aged 28)	(Argentine Football Association) Rosario Central
4	DF	Adriana Sachs	25 December 1993 (aged 25)	(Argentine Football Association) UAI Urquiza
3	DF	Eliana Stábile	26 November 1993 (aged 25)	(Argentine Football Association) Boca Juniors
18	DF	Gabriela Chávez	9 April 1989 (aged 30)	(Argentine Football Association) River Plate
16	MF	Natalie Juncos	28 December 1990 (aged 28)	(Argentine Football Association) UAI Urquiza
17	MF	Mariela Coronel	20 June 1981 (aged 38)	(Royal Spanish Football Federation) Granada
10	MF	Dalila Ippólito	24 March 2002 (aged 17)	(Argentine Football Association) River Plate
14	MF	Miriam Mayorga	20 November 1989 (aged 29)	(Argentine Football Association) UAI Urquiza
5	MF	Vanesa Santana	3 September 1990 (aged 28)	(Royal Spanish Football Federation) Logroño
8	FW	Micaela Cabrera	18 July 1997 (aged 22)	(Argentine Football Association) Boca Juniors
11	FW	Mariana Larroquette	24 October 1992 (aged 26)	(Argentine Football Association) UAI Urquiza
9	FW	Milagros Menéndez	23 March 1997 (aged 22)	(Argentine Football Association) UAI Urquiza
7	FW	Yael Oviedo	22 May 1992 (aged 27)	(Royal Spanish Football Federation) Rayo Vallecano
15	FW	Yamila Rodríguez	24 January 1998 (aged 21)	(Argentine Football Association) Boca Juniors

Group B

Pos	Team	Pld	W	D	L	GF	GA	GD	Pts	Qualification
1	Costa Rica	3	2	1	0	6	2	+4	7	Knockout stage
2	Argentina	3	2	1	0	4	0	+4	7	Knockout stage
3	Panama	3	0	1	2	2	5	−3	1	Fifth place match
4	Peru (H)	3	0	1	2	2	7	−5	1	Seventh place match

Source: Lima 2019
Rules for classification: Tie-breakers
(H) Hosts
28 July 2019
20:30

Argentina	3–0	Peru
Larroquette 6', 88'; Oviedo 9'	Report

Estadio Universidad San Marcos
Referee: Dione Rissios (Chile)
31 July 2019
17:30

Panama	0–1	Argentina
	Report	Larroquette 66'

Estadio Universidad San Marcos
Referee: Yercinia Correa (Venezuela)
3 August 2019
17:30

Costa Rica	0–0	Argentina
	Report

Estadio Universidad San Marcos
Referee: Silvia Ríos (Uruguay)

Semifinals

6 August 2019
17:30

Paraguay	0–3	Argentina
	Report	Larroquette 13' (pen.); Cometti 20'; Oviedo 34'

Estadio Universidad San Marcos
Referee: Dione Rissios (Chile)

Gold medal match

9 August 2019
20:30

Argentina	1–1 (a.e.t.)	Colombia
Barroso 41'	Report	Usme 33'
Penalties
Larroquette (penalty scored); Stábile (penalty scored); Santana (penalty scored); Cometti (penalty scored); Oviedo (penalty scored); Barroso (penalty scored); Chávez (penalty missed)	6–7	(penalty scored) Usme; (penalty scored) Restrepo; (penalty scored) Gaitán; (penalty scored) Echeverri; (penalty scored) Santos; (penalty scored) Vanegas; (penalty scored) C. Arias

Estadio Universidad San Marcos
Referee: Susana Corella (Ecuador)

== Golf ==
Argentina qualified a full team of four golfers (two men and two women).

Athlete	Event	Round 1	Round 2	Round 3	Round 4	Total		
Athlete	Event	Score	Score	Score	Score	Score	Par	Rank
Miguel Ángel Carballo	Men's individual	68	65	71	70	274	−10	7
Carlos Goya	Men's individual	70	70	72	67	279	−5	14
Ela Anacona	Women's individual	76	74	69	75	294	+10	15
Manuela Carbajo	Women's individual	70	79	73	81	303	+19	24
Ela Anacona; Manuela Carbajo; Miguel Ángel Carballo; Carlos Goya	Mixed team	138	139	140	142	559	−9	6

== Gymnastics ==
=== Artistic ===
Men
Team Finals & Individual Qualification

Athlete	Event	Apparatus						Qualification		Final	
Athlete	Event	F	PH	R	V	PB	HB	Total	Rank	Total	Rank
Nicolás Córdoba	Individual	12.300	6.900	12.350	13.100	12.900	11.500	69.050	33	—N/a	
Julián Jato	Individual	DNS	—N/a	—N/a	12.650	DNS	DNS	DNF		—N/a	
Santiago Mayol	Individual	13.150	13.300	12.850	13.900	12.200	11.650	77.050	15 Q	—N/a	
Daniel Villafañe	Individual	12.700	10.500	13.850	13.675	11.350	11.750	74.350	25 Q	—N/a	
Federico Molinari	Individual	—N/a		14.500	—N/a			14.500		—N/a	
Total	Team	38.150	30.700	41.200	41.200	36.450	34.900	—N/a		222.600	8

Individual Finals

Athlete	Event	Final							
Athlete	Event	F	PH	R	V	PB	HB	Total	Rank
Santiago Mayol	Individual all-around	13.200	12.500	11.450	13.950	11.350	12.675	75.125	19
Federico Molinari	Rings	—N/a		14.066	—N/a			14.066	3rd place, bronze medalist(s)
Daniel Villafañe	Individual all-around	12.500	10.350	13.900	14.400	12.900	11.600	75.650	17
Daniel Villafañe	Rings	—N/a		13.633	—N/a			13.633	7

Women
Team Finals & Individual Qualification

Athlete	Event	Apparatus				Qualification		Final	
Athlete	Event	F	V	UB	BB	Total	Rank	Total	Rank
Martina Dominici	Individual	13.200	14.600	13.350	11.700	52.850	6 Q	—N/a	
Luna Fernández	Individual	11.800	11.650	12.300	11.750	47.500	25 Q	—N/a	
Abigail Magistrati	Individual	13.100	0.000	13.000	11.950	38.050	39	—N/a	
Valeria Pereyra	Individual	—N/a	—N/a	12.450	—N/a	12.450		—N/a	
Agustina Pisos	Individual	12.650	13.000	—N/a	12.275	37.925		—N/a	
Total	Team	38.950	39.250	38.800	36.425	—N/a		153.425	4

Individual Finals

Athlete	Event	Final					
Athlete	Event	F	V	UB	BB	Total	Rank
Martina Dominici	Individual All-around	12.850	13.850	13.300	12.800	52.800	4
Martina Dominici	Floor	13.233	—N/a			13.233	6
Martina Dominici	Vault	—N/a	13.666	—N/a		13.666	6
Martina Dominici	Uneven bars	—N/a		13.433	—N/a	13.433	5
Luna Fernández	Individual All-around	12.350	13.350	12.750	12.000	50.450	9
Abigail Magistrati	Floor	12.866	—N/a			12.866	8
Abigail Magistrati	Uneven bars	—N/a		12.200	—N/a	12.200	8
Agustina Pisos	Balance beam	—N/a			12.200	12.200	6

=== Rhythmic ===
Individual Qualification

Athlete	Event	Apparatus				Total	
Athlete	Event	Ball	Clubs	Hoop	Ribbon	Score	Rank
Celeste D'Arcángelo	All-around	15.600	13.950	15.200	11.400	56.150	13
Sol Fainberg	All-around	14.950	16.500	17.450	14.150	63.050	7

Individual Finals

Athlete	Event	Apparatus				Total	
Athlete	Event	Ball	Clubs	Hoop	Ribbon	Score	Rank
Celeste D'Arcángelo	Ball	13.850	—N/a			13.580	8
Sol Fainberg	Hoop	—N/a		17.700	—N/a	17.700	4
Sol Fainberg	Clubs	—N/a	16.050	—N/a		16.050	7

=== Trampoline ===
Argentina qualified a team of three gymnasts in trampoline (one man and two women).

Athlete	Event	Qualification		Final	
Athlete	Event	Score	Rank	Score	Rank
Lucas Adorno	Men's	102.445	5 Q	6.385	8
Mara Colombo	Women's	79.955	10	did not advance	
Lucila Maldonado	Women's	94.110	8 Q	49.350	7

== Handball ==
Argentina qualified men's and women's teams.

Summary

Team	Event	Group stage				Semifinal	Final / BM	
Team	Event	Opposition Result	Opposition Result	Opposition Result	Rank	Opposition Result	Opposition Result	Rank
Argentina men	Men's tournament	United States; W 38–25	Chile; W 31–29	Cuba; W 23–21	1 Q	Mexico; W 34–14	Chile; W 31–27	1st place, gold medalist(s)
Argentina women	Women's tournament	United States; W 26–15	Peru; W 52–7	Dominican Republic; W 27–17	1 Q	Cuba; W 31–21	Brazil; L 21–30	2nd place, silver medalist(s)

=== Men's tournament ===
Pos	Team	Pld	W	D	L	GF	GA	GD	Pts	Qualification
1	Argentina	3	3	0	0	92	75	+17	6	Semifinals
2	Chile	3	2	0	1	101	85	+16	4	Semifinals
3	United States	3	1	0	2	77	97	−20	2	5–8th place semifinals
4	Cuba	3	0	0	3	74	87	−13	0	5–8th place semifinals

Source: Lima 2019
Rules for classification: 1) points; 2) head-to-head points; 3) head-to-head goal difference; 4) head-to-head goals scored; 5) goal difference; 6) goals scored; 7) draw.

31 July 2019; 20:30	Argentina	38–25	United States	Villa Deportiva Nacional; Referees: Pinto, Menezes (BRA)
31 July 2019; 20:30	Baronetto 7	(21–13)	Fofana 7	Villa Deportiva Nacional; Referees: Pinto, Menezes (BRA)
31 July 2019; 20:30	1× (yellow card) 6× (suspension)	Report	2× (yellow card) 7× (suspension)	Villa Deportiva Nacional; Referees: Pinto, Menezes (BRA)

1 August 2019; 20:30	Chile	29−31	Argentina	Villa Deportiva Nacional; Referees: Raluy, Sabroso (ESP)
1 August 2019; 20:30	Er. Feuchtmann 7	(15−12)	Simonet 8	Villa Deportiva Nacional; Referees: Raluy, Sabroso (ESP)
1 August 2019; 20:30	3× (yellow card) 8× (suspension) 1× (red card)	Report	3× (yellow card) 6× (suspension)	Villa Deportiva Nacional; Referees: Raluy, Sabroso (ESP)

2 August 2019; 18:00	Argentina	23–21	Cuba	Villa Deportiva Nacional; Referees: Pinto, Menezes (BRA)
2 August 2019; 18:00	F. Pizarro 6	(11–10)	Corzo 5	Villa Deportiva Nacional; Referees: Pinto, Menezes (BRA)
2 August 2019; 18:00	4× (yellow card) 6× (suspension)	Report	2× (yellow card) 7× (suspension) 1× (red card)	Villa Deportiva Nacional; Referees: Pinto, Menezes (BRA)

Semifinal

4 August 2019; 20:30	Argentina	34–14	Mexico	Villa Deportiva Nacional; Referees: Sosa, Lemes (URU)
4 August 2019; 20:30	F. Pizarro 9	(16–7)	Al. Villalobos 4	Villa Deportiva Nacional; Referees: Sosa, Lemes (URU)
4 August 2019; 20:30	1× (suspension)	Report	1× (yellow card) 1× (suspension)	Villa Deportiva Nacional; Referees: Sosa, Lemes (URU)

Gold medal match

5 August 2019; 20:30	Chile	27–31	Argentina	Villa Deportiva Nacional; Referees: Raluy, Sabroso (ESP)
5 August 2019; 20:30	Er. Feuchtmann 7	(14–15)	Simonet 11	Villa Deportiva Nacional; Referees: Raluy, Sabroso (ESP)
5 August 2019; 20:30	4× (yellow card) 7× (suspension)	Report	1× (yellow card) 4× (suspension)	Villa Deportiva Nacional; Referees: Raluy, Sabroso (ESP)

=== Women's tournament ===
Pos	Team	Pld	W	D	L	GF	GA	GD	Pts	Qualification
1	Argentina	3	3	0	0	105	39	+66	6	Semifinals
2	United States	3	2	0	1	70	59	+11	4	Semifinals
3	Dominican Republic	3	1	0	2	85	69	+16	2	5–8th place semifinals
4	Peru (H)	3	0	0	3	34	127	−93	0	5–8th place semifinals

Source: Lima 2019
Rules for classification: 1) points; 2) head-to-head points; 3) head-to-head goal difference; 4) head-to-head goals scored; 5) goal difference; 6) goals scored; 7) draw.
(H) Hosts

24 July 2019; 18:00	Argentina	26−15	United States	Villa Deportiva Nacional; Referees: Zuñiga, Reyes (CUB)
24 July 2019; 18:00	Karsten 5	(13−8)	Andersen, Rhoads 5	Villa Deportiva Nacional; Referees: Zuñiga, Reyes (CUB)
24 July 2019; 18:00	1× (yellow card) 3× (suspension)	Report	2× (yellow card) 6× (suspension)	Villa Deportiva Nacional; Referees: Zuñiga, Reyes (CUB)

25 July 2019; 18:00	Peru	7−52	Argentina	Villa Deportiva Nacional; Referees: Sosa, Lemes (URU)
25 July 2019; 18:00	Cruz 4	(2−25)	Karsten 10	Villa Deportiva Nacional; Referees: Sosa, Lemes (URU)
25 July 2019; 18:00	1× (yellow card) 6× (suspension)	Report	1× (yellow card) 1× (suspension)	Villa Deportiva Nacional; Referees: Sosa, Lemes (URU)

27 July 2019; 20:30	Argentina	27–17	Dominican Republic	Villa Deportiva Nacional; Referees: Pinto, Menezes (BRA)
27 July 2019; 20:30	Pizzo 6	(13–6)	Cabrera 4	Villa Deportiva Nacional; Referees: Pinto, Menezes (BRA)
27 July 2019; 20:30	1× (yellow card) 6× (suspension)	Report	1× (yellow card) 8× (suspension) 1× (red card)	Villa Deportiva Nacional; Referees: Pinto, Menezes (BRA)

Semifinal

29 July 2019; 18:00	Argentina	31–21	Cuba	Villa Deportiva Nacional; Referees: Raluy, Sabroso (ESP)
29 July 2019; 18:00	Karsten 6	(17–7)	Rizo 8	Villa Deportiva Nacional; Referees: Raluy, Sabroso (ESP)
29 July 2019; 18:00	2× (yellow card) 3× (suspension)	Report	2× (yellow card) 3× (suspension) 1× (red card)	Villa Deportiva Nacional; Referees: Raluy, Sabroso (ESP)

Gold medal match

30 July 2019; 20:30	Argentina	21–30	Brazil	Villa Deportiva Nacional; Referees: Sosa, Lemes (URU)
30 July 2019; 20:30	Karsten 4	(12–12)	Amorim, Fachinello 5	Villa Deportiva Nacional; Referees: Sosa, Lemes (URU)
30 July 2019; 20:30	1× (yellow card) 1× (suspension)	Report	4× (yellow card) 5× (suspension)	Villa Deportiva Nacional; Referees: Sosa, Lemes (URU)

== Judo ==
Men

Athlete	Event	Round of 16	Quarterfinal	Semifinal	Repechage	Final / BM	
Athlete	Event	Opposition Result	Opposition Result	Opposition Result	Opposition Result	Opposition Result	Rank
Minoru Tamashiro	–66 kg	—N/a	J González (COL); L 00–11	did not advance			
Luis Vega	–81 kg	Bye	E Santos (BRA); L 00S2–01	Did not advance	N Peña (VEN); L 01–10	did not advance	
Tomás Spikermann	–90 kg	Bye	F Balanta (COL); L 00S3–10	Did not advance	Y Galarreta (PER); L 00S1–10	did not advance	
Héctor Campos	+100 kg	Bye	P Vineda (VEN); L 00S3–10	Did not advance	A Tadehara (VEN); L 00S3–10S2	did not advance	

Women

Athlete	Event	Round of 16	Quarterfinal	Semifinal	Repechage	Final / BM	
Athlete	Event	Opposition Result	Opposition Result	Opposition Result	Opposition Result	Opposition Result	Rank
Paula Pareto	–48 kg	Bye	L Farias (BRA); W 01S1–00S2	V Godinez (CUB); L 00S3–10S1	Bye	Bronze medal final E Carrillo (MEX); L w/o	4
Ayelén Elizeche	–52 kg	J González (CHI); W 10–00S3	L Olvera (MEX); L 00S1–10	Did not advance	K Jiménez (PAN); L 00–10S2	did not advance	
Agustina De Lucía	–63 kg	C David (HON); W 10–00S3	A Barrios (VEN); L 00S2–01	Did not advance	H Martin (USA); L 00S3–10S1	did not advance	
Lucía Cantero	–78 kg	Bye	V Chala (VEN); L 00–10	Did not advance	D Brenes (CRC); L 00S2–10	did not advance	

== Karate ==
Men

Athlete	Event	Round robin				Semifinal	Final	
Athlete	Event	Opposition Result	Opposition Result	Opposition Result	Rank	Opposition Result	Opposition Result	Rank
Agustín Farah	–60 kg	M Larrosa (URU); L 0–5	D Brose (BRA); L 0–1	A Rendón (COL); W 1–0	3	did not advance		
Agustín Pérez	+84 kg	D Gaysinsky (CAN); L 1–4	A Castillo (DOM); W 4–3	B Irr (USA); L 1–4	3	did not advance		
Sebastián González; Luca Impagnatiello; Martín Juiz	Team kata	—N/a			3 Q	—N/a	Bronze medal final Colombia; W 24.98–24.04	3rd place, bronze medalist(s)

Women

Athlete	Event	Round robin				Semifinal	Final	
Athlete	Event	Opposition Result	Opposition Result	Opposition Result	Rank	Opposition Result	Opposition Result	Rank
Yamila Benítez	–50 kg	S Nishi (USA); L 0–3	J de Paula (BRA); L 0–6	S Rodríguez (PER); L 1–7	4	did not advance		
Valentina Castro	+68 kg	C Lingl (USA); L 3–4	O Molina (VEN); L 0–3	—N/a	3	did not advance		

== Modern pentathlon ==
Argentina qualified a full team of six modern pentathletes (three men and three women).

Men

Athlete	Event	Fencing (Épée One Touch)			Swimming (200m Freestyle)			Riding (Show Jumping)			Shooting/Running (10 m Air Pistol/3000m)			Total Points	Final Rank
Athlete	Event	Results	Rank	MP Points	Time	Rank	MP Points	Penalties	Rank	MP Points	Time	Rank	MP Points	Total Points	Final Rank
Leandro Silva	Men's individual	17 V	15th	215	2:03.98	3rd	303	13	6th	287	11:32.00	16th	608	1414	9th
Sergio Villamayor	Men's individual	22 V	2nd	250	2:19.72	22nd	281	16	8th	284	10:56.00	2nd	644	1459	3rd place, bronze medalist(s)
Emmanuel Zapata	Men's individual	19 V	9th	229	2:09.52	13th	291	42	17th	258	11:06.00	5th	634	1412	10th
Sergio Villamayor; Emmanuel Zapata	Men's relay	18 V	3rd	250	1:58.89	8th	313	60	9th	240	10:36.00	2nd	664	1468	3rd place, bronze medalist(s)

Women

Athlete	Event	Fencing (Épée One Touch)			Swimming (200m Freestyle)			Riding (Show Jumping)			Shooting/Running (10 m Air Pistol/3000m)			Total Points	Final Rank
Athlete	Event	Results	Rank	MP Points	Time	Rank	MP Points	Penalties	Rank	MP Points	Time	Rank	MP Points	Total Points	Final Rank
Iryna Khokhlova	Women's individual	21 V	6th	243	DNS	32nd	0	did not finish			DNS	32nd	0	did not finish	
Ayelén Zapata	Women's individual	24 V	2nd	264	2:37.56	23rd	235	did not finish			12:17.00	4th	563	1062	15th
Pamela Zapata	Women's individual	24 V	3rd	264	2:30.47	9th	250	did not finish			13:37.00	16th	483	997	21st
Ayelén Zapata; Pamela Zapata	Women's relay	24 V	4th	230	2:24.01	9th	262	did not finish							

== Racquetball ==
Argentina qualified five racquetball athletes (two men and three women).

Athlete	Event	Preliminary round				Round of 16	Quarterfinal	Semifinal	Final	
Athlete	Event	Opposition Result	Opposition Result	Opposition Result	Rank	Opposition Result	Opposition Result	Opposition Result	Opposition Result	Rank
Fernando Kurzbard	Men's singles	E Chacón (CUB); L 12–15, 12–15	S Murray (CAN); L 7–15, 10–15	L Pérez (DOM); L 10–15, 3–15	4	did not advance				
Shalom Manzuri	Men's singles	F Troncoso (CHI); W 15–4, 15–10	C Iwaasa (CAN); L 14–15, 15–10, 2–11	C Pratt (USA); L (w/o)	3	did not advance				
María José Vargas	Women's singles	G Martínez (GUA); W 15–4, 12–15, 11–9	A Jiménez (DOM); W 15–0, 15–1	—N/a	1 Q	Bye	K Lawrence (USA); W 15–6, 15–13	A Riveros (COL); W 15–8, 15–9	P Longoria (MEX); L 7–15, 9–15	2nd place, silver medalist(s)
Natalia Méndez	Women's singles	A Riveros (COL); W 15–10, 15–13	L Zea (VEN); W 15–1, 15–5	—N/a	1 Q	G Martínez (GUA); W 15–10, 12–15, 11–6	M Muñoz (ECU); W 15–5, 10–15, 11–7	P Longoria (MEX); L 10–15, 10–15	Did not advance	3rd place, bronze medalist(s)
Fernando Kurzbard; Shalom Manzuri	Men's doubles	Edwin Galicia (GUA); J Salvatierra (GUA); W 15–9, 15–10	R Carson (USA); C Pratt (USA); L 11–15, 15–8, 4–11	C Iwaasa (CAN); S Murray (CAN); L 0–15, 0–15	3 Q	E Chacón (CUB); M Moyet (CUB); L 10–15, 15–11, 4–11	did not advance			
Natalia Méndez; María José Vargas	Women's doubles	C Amaya (COL); C Riveros (COL); W 15–11, 15–6	L Felipe (CUB); M Viera (CUB); W 15–2, 15–5	C Muñoz (CHI); J Parada (CHI); W 15–3, 15–3	1 Q	Bye	F Lambert (CAN); J Saunders (CAN); W 15–9, 15–9	G Martínez (GUA); M Rodríguez (GUA); L 9–15, 15–10, 1–11	Did not advance	3rd place, bronze medalist(s)
Fernando Kurzbard; Shalom Manzuri	Men's team	—N/a				Costa Rica; L 0–2	did not advance			
Natalia Méndez; María José Vargas	Women's team	—N/a				Bye	Canada; W 2–0	Bolivia; W 2–0	Mexico; L 0–2	2nd place, silver medalist(s)

== Roller sports ==
=== Artistic ===
Athlete	Event	Short program		Long program		Total	
Athlete	Event	Score	Rank	Score	Rank	Score	Rank
Juan Sánchez	Men's	60.95	1	91.68	1	152.63	1st place, gold medalist(s)
Giselle Soler	Women's	38.53	1	53.62	2	92.15	2nd place, silver medalist(s)

=== Speed ===
Athlete	Event	Preliminary		Semifinal		Final	
Athlete	Event	Time	Rank	Time	Rank	Time	Rank
Francisco Reyes	Men's 300 m time trial	—N/a				25.730	6
Francisco Reyes	Men's 500 m	45.201	3	did not advance			
Ken Kuwada	Men's 10,000 m endurance	—N/a				Eliminated	
María Rodríguez	Women's 300 m time trial	—N/a				27.058	4
María Rodríguez	Women's 500 m	46.985	1 Q	DSQ		did not advance	
Rocío Berbel	Women's 10,000 m endurance	—N/a				Eliminated	

== Rowing ==
Men

Athlete	Event	Heat		Repechage		Semifinal		Final	
Athlete	Event	Time	Rank	Time	Rank	Time	Rank	Time	Rank
Brian Rosso	Single sculls	7:22.85	2 SF	Bye		7:08.84	3 FA	7:08.37	3rd place, bronze medalist(s)
Rodrigo Murillo; Cristian Rosso	Double sculls	6:27.82	1 FA	Bye		—N/a		6:25.16	1st place, gold medalist(s)
Alejandro Colomino; Carlo Lauro	Lwt double sculls	6:25.90	2 FA	Bye		—N/a		6:30.62	2nd place, silver medalist(s)
Rodrigo Murillo; Brian Rosso; Cristian Rosso; Ariel Suárez	Quadruple sculls	6:36.78	3 F	—N/a				5:50.75	1st place, gold medalist(s)
Agustín Díaz; Axel Haack	Coxless pair	7:13.47	4 F	—N/a				6:38.27	3rd place, bronze medalist(s)
Iván Carino; Agustín Díaz; Francisco Esteras; Axel Haack	Coxless four	6:55.91	5 F	—N/a				6:07.02	1st place, gold medalist(s)
Pedro Dickson; Facundo Forneris; Tomás Herrera; Ignacio Pezzente	Lwt coxless four	7:07.67	5 F	—N/a				6:17.79	5
Iván Carino; Agustín Díaz; Francisco Esteras; Axel Haack; Tomás Herrera; Joel Infante; Ariel Suárez; Joel Romero; Agustín Scenna	Coxed eight	6:18.32	4 F	—N/a				5:41.66	1st place, gold medalist(s)

Women

Athlete	Event	Heat		Repechage		Semifinal		Final	
Athlete	Event	Time	Rank	Time	Rank	Time	Rank	Time	Rank
Milka Kraljev	Lwt single sculls	7:57.24	1 FA	Bye		—N/a		7:43.60	2nd place, silver medalist(s)
Milka Kraljev; Oriana Ruiz	Double sculls	7:51.90	5 Q	—N/a				7:18.85	3rd place, bronze medalist(s)
Sonia Baluzzo; Evelyn Silvestro	Lwt double sculls	7:23.46	2 R	7:16.78	1 FA	—N/a		7:20.41	4
Sonia Baluzzo; Milka Kraljev; Milagros Porta; Oriana Ruiz	Quadruple sculls	7:38.30	5 F	—N/a				6:43.39	4

== Rugby sevens ==
Summary

Team	Event	Group stage				Semifinal	Final / BM / Pl.	
Team	Event	Opposition Result	Opposition Result	Opposition Result	Rank	Opposition Result	Opposition Result	Rank
Argentina men	Men's tournament	Jamaica; W 52–0	Uruguay; W 32–0	Canada; W 12–7	1	United States; W 31–7	Canada; W 33–10	1st place, gold medalist(s)
Argentina women	Women's tournament	Colombia; L 14–24	United States; L 0–49	Trinidad and Tobago; W 41–0	did not advance		Peru; W 34–12	5

=== Men's tournament ===
Pool stage

Pos	Team	Pld	W	D	L	PF	PA	PD	Pts	Qualification
1	Argentina	3	3	0	0	96	7	+89	9	Semifinals
2	Canada	3	2	0	1	69	12	+57	7	Semifinals
3	Jamaica	3	1	0	2	14	93	−79	5	5–8th place semifinals
4	Uruguay	3	0	0	3	10	77	−67	3	5–8th place semifinals

Source: Lima 2019
Rules for classification: 1) Points; 2) Head-to-head result; 3) Point difference; 4) Points scored; 5) draw.

26 July 2019
12:45

Argentina	52–0	Jamaica
Try: Schulz 1'c Luna (2) 3'm, 4'; Del Mestre 6'c Osadczuk 7'm Ulloa (2) 8'c, 11'c Vanni 14'c Con: Mare (3/4) 1', 5', 7'; Ulloa (3/4) 9', 11', 14'	Report

Villa María del Triunfo Sports Center
Referee: Francisco Gonzalez (Uruguay)

27 July 2019
13:05

Argentina	32–0	Uruguay
Try: Álvarez 1'c Del Mestre 5'm Gonzalez 6'm Mare 10'm Bazan Velez 12'm Sábato 13'm Con: Mare (1/3) 1'; Ulloa (0/2); Revol (0/1)	Report

Villa María del Triunfo Sports Center
Referee: Paulo Duarte (Portugal)

27 July 2019
16:55

Argentina	12–7	Canada
Try: Gonzalez 10'c Bazan Velez 12'm Con: Mare (1/2) 10'	Report	Try: Zaruba 7'c Con: Hirayama (1/1) 7'

Villa María del Triunfo Sports Center
Referee: Pualo Duarte (Portugal)

Semifinal

28 July 2019
12:05

Argentina	31–7	United States
Try: Luna (2) 2'c, 3'c Osadczuk 6'c Álvarez 9'm Vanni 14'm Con: Mare (3/4) 2', 4', 7'; Bazan Velez (0/1)	Report	Try: Clark 0'c Con: Melphy (1/1) 0'

Villa María del Triunfo Sports Center
Referee: Francisco Gonzalez (Uruguay)

Final

28 July 2019
16:00

(silver) Canada	10–33	Argentina (gold)
Try: Morra 0'm Duke 14'm Con: Hirayama (0/2)	Report	Try: Gonzalez (2) 2'c, 4'c Schulz 5'c Sábato 10'c Bazan Velez 12'm Con: Mare (4/5) 2', 4', 6', 11'

Villa María del Triunfo Sports Center
Referee: Paulo Duarte (Portugal)

=== Women's tournament ===
Pool stage

Pos	Team	Pld	W	D	L	PF	PA	PD	Pts	Qualification
1	United States	3	3	0	0	142	0	+142	9	Semifinals
2	Colombia	3	2	0	1	62	62	0	7	Semifinals
3	Argentina	3	1	0	2	55	73	−18	5	5–8th place semifinals
4	Trinidad and Tobago	3	0	0	3	10	134	−124	3	5–8th place semifinals

Source: Lima 2019
Rules for classification: 1) Points; 2) Head-to-head result; 3) Point difference; 4) Points scored; 5) draw.

26 July 2019
9:50

Colombia	24–14	Argentina
Try: Romero 1'm Arzuaga 3'c Mejia (2) 6'c, 7'm Con: Lopera (2/3) 3', 7'; Romero (0/1)	Report	Try: Montero 0'c Mattus 9'c Con: Montero (1/1) 1'; Padellaro (1/1) 9'

Villa María del Triunfo Sports Center
Referee: Emily Hsieh (United States)

27 July 2019
10:35

United States	49–0	Argentina
Try: Tapper (3) 1'm, 6'm, 8'm Henrich 2'm Emba (2) 7'c, 11'm Olsen (2) 9'm, 14'm Rovetti 12'm Con: Emba (1/3) 7'; Olsen (1/6) 10'	Report

Villa María del Triunfo Sports Center
Referee: Shanda Mosher-Gallant (Canada)

27 July 2019
14:00

Argentina	41–0	Trinidad and Tobago
Try: Casas 1'm A. Moreno 3'c Trigo 4'm Montero 4'm Pedrozo 7'c Genghini 9'c Mattus 12'm Corzo 13'm Con: Padellaro (1/4) 3'; Aguilar (2/4) 8', 9'	Report

Villa María del Triunfo Sports Center
Referee: Nayara Santos (Brazil)

5th–8th place classification

28 July 2019
9:35

Argentina	32–7	Mexico
Try: Pedrozo (2) 0'm, 6'm Montero 3'c Aguilar (2) 4'm, 8'm Moreno 9'm Con: Otero (1/4) 4'; Aguilar (0/2)	Report	Try: Penalty try 12'

Villa María del Triunfo Sports Center
Referee: Nayara Santos (Brazil)

Fifth place match

28 July 2019
13:25

Peru	12–34	Argentina
Try: Flores 3'c Quesada 11'm Con: Quesada (1/2) 4'	Report	Try: Montero (3) 2'c, 5'c, 14'm Aguilar 8'm Pedrozo 10'm Mattus 12'm Con: Padellaro (2/4) 2', 5'; Aguilar (0/2)

Villa María del Triunfo Sports Center
Referee: Shanda Mosher-Gallant (Canada)

== Sailing ==
Argentina has qualified 11 boats for a total of 17 sailors.

Men

Athlete	Event	Race													Total	
Athlete	Event	1	2	3	4	5	6	7	8	9	10	11	12	M	Points	Rank
Bautista Saubidet Birkner	RS:X	2	1	1	3	1	2	3	3	3	1	1	3	4	25	1st place, gold medalist(s)
Juan Pablo Bisio	Laser	11	6	9	10	12	4	9	12	10	9	—N/a		8	84	8
Klaus Lange; Yago Lange	49er	5	3	6	1	2	2	4	1	3	OCS	5	1	2	35	2nd place, silver medalist(s)

Women

Athlete	Event	Race													Total	
Athlete	Event	1	2	3	4	5	6	7	8	9	10	11	12	M	Points	Rank
María Celia Tejerina	RS:X	1	3	1	1	4	3	1	DNF	5	2	2	4	8	35	2nd place, silver medalist(s)
Lucía Falasca	Laser radial	8	3	10	8	3	8	3	3	4	2	—N/a		6	43	3rd place, bronze medalist(s)
María Sol Branz; Victoria Travascio	49erFX	2	3	2	2	4	3	3	1	2	4	4	DSQ	2	34	3rd place, bronze medalist(s)

Mixed

Athlete	Event	Race													Total	
Athlete	Event	1	2	3	4	5	6	7	8	9	10	11	12	M	Points	Rank
Brenda Quagliotti; Luis Soubie	Snipe	6	5	1	9	6	4	4	7	1	6	—N/a		2	42	5
Javier Conte; Ignacio Giammona; Paula Salerno	Lightning	4	3	2	5	1	1	3	1	2	1	—N/a		2	20	1st place, gold medalist(s)
Eugenia Bosco; Mateo Majdalani	Nacra 17	3	1	4	2	2	2	2	3	2	10	3	3	2	27	2nd place, silver medalist(s)

Open

Athlete	Event	Race																			Total	
Athlete	Event	1	2	3	4	5	6	7	8	9	10	11	12	13	14	15	16	17	18	M	Points	Rank
Martín Alsogaray	Sunfish	8	10	3	5	6	8	3	DSQ	7	4	—N/a								12	66	7
José Fazio	Kites	9	9	7	10	9	8	9	10	9	8	10	9	10	9	9	8	7	8	—N/a	126	10

== Shooting ==
Men

Pistol and rifle

Athlete	Event	Qualification		Final	
Athlete	Event	Points	Rank	Points	Rank
Juan Manuel Fragueiro	10 m air pistol	560	20	did not advance	
Sebastián Lobo	10 m air pistol	559	22	did not advance	
Alexis Eberhardt	10 m air rifle	620.7	6 Q	203.2	4
Julián Gutiérrez	10 m air rifle	621.0	5 Q	224.5	3rd place, bronze medalist(s)
Alexis Eberhardt	50 m rifle three position	1156	6 Q	425.3	4
Alejandro Pasero	50 m rifle three position	1145	10	did not advance	

Shotgun

Athlete	Event	Qualification		Final / BM	
Athlete	Event	Points	Rank	Opposition Result	Rank
Fernando Borello	Trap	110	19	did not advance	
Fernando Vidal	Trap	107	22	did not advance	
Federico Gil	Skeet	116	14	did not advance	
Ariel Romero	Skeet	117	12	did not advance	

Women

Pistol and rifle

Athlete	Event	Qualification		Final	
Athlete	Event	Points	Rank	Points	Rank
Laura Ramos	10 m air pistol	550	17	did not advance	
Rocio Ravier	10 m air pistol	546	19	did not advance	
Fernanda Russo	10 m air rifle	618.7	8 Q	225.8	3rd place, bronze medalist(s)
Alliana Volkart	10 m air rifle	621.6	4 Q	162.1	6
Amelia Fournel	50 m rifle three position	1129	19	did not advance	
Sofía Lamarque	50 m rifle three position	1154	5 Q	390.9	8

Shotgun

Athlete	Event	Qualification		Final / BM	
Athlete	Event	Points	Rank	Opposition Result	Rank
Melisa Gil	Skeet	116	4 Q	29	4

Mixed

Athlete	Event	Qualification		Final	
Athlete	Event	Points	Rank	Points	Rank
Juan Manuel Fragueiro; Laura Cecilia Ramos	10 m air pistol	753	7	did not advance	
Sebastián Lobo; Rocio Ravier	10 m air pistol	735	19	did not advance	
Alexis Eberhardt; Alliana Volkart	10 m air rifle	819.8	13	did not advance	
Julián Gutiérrez; Fernanda Russo	10 m air rifle	828.3	4 Q	499.2	1st place, gold medalist(s)

== Softball ==
Argentina qualified a men's team (of 15 athletes) by being ranked in the top five nations at the 2017 Pan American Championships.

=== Men's tournament ===
Preliminary round

Team	Pld	W	L	RF	RA	RD	Qualification
Argentina	5	5	0	29	4	+25	Qualified for the semifinals
United States	5	4	1	38	10	+28	Qualified for the semifinals
Cuba	5	3	2	33	22	+11	Qualified for the semifinals
Mexico	5	2	3	31	23	+8	Qualified for the semifinals
Venezuela	5	1	4	7	17	−10	
Peru	5	0	5	0	62	−62	

25 July 2019; 14:00	Mexico	3–4	Argentina	Softball Field, Villa María del Triunfo; Attendance: 500
25 July 2019; 14:00		Boxscore		Softball Field, Villa María del Triunfo; Attendance: 500

27 July 2019; 10:00	Argentina	1–0 (F/8)	Venezuela	Softball Field, Villa María del Triunfo; Attendance: 612
27 July 2019; 10:00		Boxscore		Softball Field, Villa María del Triunfo; Attendance: 612

28 July 2019; 10:00	Argentina	3–0	United States	Softball Field, Villa María del Triunfo; Attendance: 715
28 July 2019; 10:00		Boxscore		Softball Field, Villa María del Triunfo; Attendance: 715

29 July 2019; 10:00	Cuba	1–8	Argentina	Softball Field, Villa María del Triunfo
29 July 2019; 10:00		Boxscore		Softball Field, Villa María del Triunfo

30 July 2019; 18:00	Argentina	13–0	Peru	Softball Field, Villa María del Triunfo
30 July 2019; 18:00		Boxscore		Softball Field, Villa María del Triunfo

Semifinals

31 July 2019; 14:00	Argentina	7–0	United States	Softball Field, Villa María del Triunfo
31 July 2019; 14:00		Boxscore		Softball Field, Villa María del Triunfo

Grand final

1 August 2019; 14:00	Argentina	5–0	United States	Softball Field, Villa María del Triunfo
1 August 2019; 14:00		Boxscore		Softball Field, Villa María del Triunfo

== Squash ==
Men

Athlete	Event	Group stage			Round of 32	Round of 16	Quarterfinal	Semifinal / Cl.	Final / BM / Pl.	
Athlete	Event	Opposition Result	Opposition Result	Rank	Opposition Result	Opposition Result	Opposition Result	Opposition Result	Opposition Result	Rank
Leandro Romiglio	Singles	—N/a			Bye	Todd Harrity (USA); L 4–11, 7–11, 3–11	did not advance			
Robertino Pezzota	Singles	—N/a			Bye	Arias (CHI); W 11–7, 11–5, 11–5	Martinez (MEX); W 14–12, 11–5, 5–11, 6–11, 13–11	Rodríguez (COL); L 11–9, 14–16, 6–11, 7–11	Did not advance	3rd place, bronze medalist(s)
Robertino Pezzota; Leandro Romiglio	Doubles	—N/a				Bye	Sachvie / Delierre (CAN); L 5–11, 11–7, 10–11	did not advance		
Robertino Pezzota; Leandro Romiglio; Gonzalo Manuel Miranda	Team	Canada; L 0–3, 0–3, 0–3	El Salvador; W 3–2, 3–1, 3–1	2	—N/a	Bermuda; W 3–0, 3–1	Mexico; L 0–3, 1–3	5th–8th place classification Brazil; L 0–3, 3–0, 2–3	Seventh place match Peru; W 3–0, 3–0, 3–0 (Retired)	7

Women

Athlete	Event	Group stage			Round of 16	Quarterfinal	Semifinal	Final / BM / Pl.	
Athlete	Event	Opposition Result	Opposition Result	Rank	Opposition Result	Opposition Result	Opposition Result	Opposition Result	Rank
Pilar Etchechoury	Singles	—N/a			Bye	Cornett (CAN); L 11–13, 0–11, 7–11	did not advance		
Maria Antonella Falcione	Singles	—N/a			Bye	Hermosa (PER); W 11–1, 11–4, 11–5	Naughton (CAN); L 5–11, 2–11, 6–11	did not advance	
Camila Grosso; Pilar Etchechoury	Doubles	—N/a				Amanda Sobhy / Sabrina Sobhy (USA); L 3–11, 8–11	did not advance		
Camila Grosso; Pilar Etchechoury; Maria Antonella Falcione	Team	Chile; W 3–1, 0–3, 3–2	Mexico; L 0–3, 2–3, 0–3	2	—N/a	Colombia; L 0–3, 0–3	5th–8th place classification Chile; W 0–3, 3–2, 2–0	Fifth place match Guyana; W 3–0, 3–1	5

Mixed

Athlete	Event	Quarterfinal	Semifinal	Final / BM	
Athlete	Event	Opposition Result	Opposition Result	Opposition Result	Rank
Maria Antonella Falcione; Gonzalo Manuel Miranda	Doubles	Ávila / García (MEX); L 2–11, 3–11	did not advance		

== Surfing ==
Argentina qualified nine surfers (five men and four women) in the sport's debut at the Pan American Games.

Artistic

Athlete	Event	Round 1	Round 2	Round 3	Round 4	Repechage 1	Repechage 2	Repechage 3	Repechage 4	Repechage 5	Bronze medal	Final	
Athlete	Event	Opposition Result	Opposition Result	Opposition Result	Opposition Result	Opposition Result	Opposition Result	Opposition Result	Opposition Result	Opposition Result	Opposition Result	Opposition Result	Rank
Santiago Muñiz	Men's open	Pérez (ESA); L 6.17–11.80	did not advance			Barona (ECU); W 17.00–6.50	Santos (BRA); W 11.46–10.00	Bellorin (VEN); W 12.17–11.10	Fillingim (CRC); W 14.16–10.30	Usuna (ARG); L 4.73–10.50	did not advance		
Leandro Usuna	Men's open	Corzo (MEX); W 10.26–9.20	Mesinas (PER); L 12.50–14.07	did not advance		Bye	Corzo (MEX); W 15.43–5.67	Correa (PER); W 13.00–12.83	McGonagle (CRC); W 13.40–12.50	Muñiz (ARG); W 10.50–4.73	Pérez (ESA); W 16.27–13.70	Mesinas (PER); L 13.77–14.00	2nd place, silver medalist(s)
Mariano De Cabo	Men's stand up paddleboard	Gómez (COL), Colucci (VEN); W 7.87	Spencer (CAN), Hughes (USA); 7.84	did not advance		Bye	Diniz (BRA); L 7.34–17.34	did not advance					
Surfiel Lo Prete	Men's longboard	Conceição (BRA), Cortéz (CHI); 14.17 Q	Robbins (USA), Schweizer (URU); 8.10	did not advance		Bye	Villao (ECU); W 11.60–5.90	Conceição (BRA); W 12.90–7.60	Schweizer (URU); L 14.73–15.00	did not advance			
Lucía Indurain	Women's open	Álvarez (VEN); W 13.00–9.60	Barona (ECU); L 7.74–12.57	did not advance		Bye	Álvarez (VEN); W 11.40–9.27	Anderson (CHI); L 9.77–11.67	did not advance				
Ornella Pellizzari	Women's open	Giunta (PER); W 13.33–2.46	Zelasko (CAN); W 6.83–5.67	Rosas (PER); L 11.67–14.17	Did not advance	Bye			Giunta (PER); W 12.90–1.57	Detmers (MEX); W 4.33–0.43	Barona (ECU); L 12.17–17.10	Did not advance	3rd place, bronze medalist(s)
Lucía Cosoleto	Women's stand up paddleboard	Gómez (COL), Soriano (ECU); 6.17 Q	Pacelli (BRA), Appleby (USA); 7.40	did not advance		Bye	Bruhwiler (CAN); W 10.40–4.74	Gómez (COL); L 3.20–10.20	did not advance				
María Gil Boggan	Women's longboard	Dempfle-Olin (CAN), Machuca (MEX); W 9.06 Q	Reyes (PER), Thompson (USA); 7.83 Q	Calmon (BRA); 9.70	Did not advance	Bye		Soriano (ECU); W 6.60–6.03	Reyes (PER); L 7.26–10.83	—N/a	did not advance		

Race

Athlete	Event	Time	Rank
Franco Faccin	Men's stand up paddleboard	28:40.4	6
Juliana González	Women's stand up paddleboard	36:58.3	5

== Swimming ==
Argentina qualified 17 swimmers (11 men and six women).

Men

Athlete	Event	Heat		Final	
Athlete	Event	Time	Rank	Time	Rank
Guido Buscaglia	50 m freestyle	23.06	5 FB	23.09	5
Santiago Grassi	50 m freestyle	22.70	3 FA	22.28	6
Guido Buscaglia	100 m freestyle	49.73; Swim-off FA; 50.19	3 Swim-off FA; 3 FB	50.15	4
Federico Grabich	100 m freestyle	49.88	4 FA	did not start	
Federico Grabich	200 m freestyle	1:50.83	3 FB	did not start	
Franco Cassini	400 m freestyle	3:58.94	5	did not advance	
Agustín Hernández	100 m backstroke	56.43	3 FB	56.15	3
Agustín Hernández	200 m backstroke	2:04.93	5 FB	2:05.52	5
Gabriel Morelli	100 m breaststroke	1:02.07	5 FB	1:02.52	5
Gabriel Morelli	200 m breaststroke	2:13.64	2 FA	2:12.83	5
Santiago Grassi	100 m butterfly	51.92	2 FA	52.15	4
Roberto Strelkov	100 m butterfly	54.18	3 FB	54.04	1
Nicolás Deferrari	200 m butterfly	2:00.37	3 FA	2:01.84	7
Guido Buscaglia; Federico Grabich; Santiago Grassi; Lautaro Rodríguez	4 × 100 m freestyle relay	—N/a		Disqualified	
Heats; Guido Buscaglia; Nicolás Deferrari; Agustín Hernández; Gabriel Morelli; Final; Federico Grabich; Santiago Grassi; Agustín Hernández; Gabriel Morelli	4 × 100 m medley relay	3:44.50	4 FA	3:38.41	3rd place, bronze medalist(s)
Guillermo Bertola	Men's marathon 10 km	—N/a		~~1:54:00.0~~	DSQ

Women

Athlete	Event	Heat		Final	
Athlete	Event	Time	Rank	Time	Rank
Delfina Pignatiello	400 m freestyle	4:12.23	1 FA	4:10.86	1st place, gold medalist(s)
Delfina Pignatiello	800 m freestyle	—N/a		8:29.42	1st place, gold medalist(s)
Delfina Pignatiello	1500 m freestyle	—N/a		16:16.54	1st place, gold medalist(s)
Andrea Berrino	100 m backstroke	1:02.34	3 FA	did not start	
Andrea Berrino	200 m backstroke	2:13.68	3 FA	2:12.71	5
Florencia Perotti	200 m backstroke	2:16.67	2 FA	2:16.75	7
Macarena Ceballos	100 m breaststroke	1:10.27	2 FB	1:09.48	1
Julia Sebastián	100 m breaststroke	1:06.98	1 FA	1:07.09	2nd place, silver medalist(s)
Macarena Ceballos	200 m breaststroke	2:32.08	3 FB	2:33.80	3
Julia Sebastián	200 m breaststroke	2:29.27	1 FA	2:25.43	3rd place, bronze medalist(s)
Virginia Bardach	200 m butterfly	2:11.37	1 FA	2:10.87	1st place, gold medalist(s)
Virginia Bardach	200 m medley	2:18.54	3 FA	2:18.54	8
Florencia Perotti	200 m medley	2:19.49	3 FB	2:20.68	2
Virginia Bardach	400 m medley	4:50.09	2 FA	4:41.05	2nd place, silver medalist(s)
Florencia Perotti	400 m medley	4:52.39	3 FA	4:49.25	6
Virginia Bardach; Andrea Berrino; Florencia Perotti; Delfina Pignatiello	4 × 200 m freestyle relay	—N/a		8:15.72	4
Heats; Andrea Berrino; Macarena Ceballos; Florencia Perotti; Julia Sebastián; Final; Andrea Berrino; Virginia Bardach; Macarena Ceballos; Julia Sebastián	4 × 100 m medley relay	4:15.44	2 FA	4:07.70	4
Cecilia Biagioli	Women's marathon 10 km	—N/a		2:01:23.2	2nd place, silver medalist(s)

Mixed

Athlete	Event	Heat		Final	
Athlete	Event	Time	Rank	Time	Rank
Heats; Andrea Berrino; Guido Buscaglia; Macarena Ceballos; Lautaro Rodríguez; Final; Andrea Berrino; Guido Buscaglia; Federico Grabich; Delfina Pignatiello	4 × 100 m freestyle relay	3:39.57	3 Q	3:34.87	5
Heats; Virginia Bardach; Florencia Perotti; Lautaro Rodríguez; Roberto Strelkov; Final; Andrea Berrino; Federico Grabich; Santiago Grassi; Julia Sebastián	4 × 100 m medley relay	4:03.14	4 Q	3:50.53	3rd place, bronze medalist(s)

== Table tennis ==
Singles

Athlete	Event	Round of 32	Round of 16	Quarterfinal	Semifinal	Final / BM	
Athlete	Event	Opposition Result	Opposition Result	Opposition Result	Opposition Result	Opposition Result	Rank
Gastón Alto	Men's singles	B Blas (PER); W 4–0	K Jha (USA); L 1–4	did not advance			
Horacio Cifuentes	Men's singles	R Tapia (ECU); W 4–2	E Wang (CAN); L 1–4	did not advance			
Camila Argüelles	Women's singles	C Barcenas (MEX); W 4–0	P Medina (COL); L 0–4	did not advance			
Ana Codina	Women's singles	H Zapata (GUA); L 3–4	did not advance				

Doubles

Athlete	Event	Round of 16	Quarterfinal	Semifinal	Final / BM	
Athlete	Event	Opposition Result	Opposition Result	Opposition Result	Opposition Result	Rank
Gastón Alto; Horacio Cifuentes	Men's doubles	Bye	N Kumar (USA); N Tio (USA); W 4–2	E Santos (DOM); J Wu (DOM); W 4–3	H Calderano (BRA); G Tsuboi (BRA); L 2–4	2nd place, silver medalist(s)
Camila Argüelles; Ana Codina	Women's doubles	N Paredes (ECU); M Plaza (ECU); W 4–1	A Díaz (PUR); M Díaz (PUR); L 1–4	did not advance		
Camila Argüelles; Horacio Cifuentes	Mixed doubles	J Campos (CUB); D Fonseca (CUB); L 3–4	did not advance			

Team competition

Athlete	Event	Preliminary round			Quarterfinal	Semifinal	Final	
Athlete	Event	Opposition Result	Opposition Result	Rank	Opposition Result	Opposition Result	Opposition Result	Rank
Gastón Alto; Horacio Cifuentes; Pablo Tabachnik	Men's team	Peru; W 3–1	Paraguay; W 3–2	1 Q	Puerto Rico; W 3–0	Cuba; W 3–0	United States; L 2–3	2nd place, silver medalist(s)
Camila Argüelles; Ana Codina; Candela Molero	Women's team	United States; L 0–3	Guatemala; W 3–1	2 Q	Puerto Rico; L 0–3	did not advance		

== Taekwondo ==
Men

Athlete	Event	Round of 16	Quarterfinals	Semifinals	Repechage	Bronze Medal	Final	
Athlete	Event	Opposition Result	Opposition Result	Opposition Result	Opposition Result	Opposition Result	Opposition Result	Rank
Lucas Guzmán	Men's −58kg	—N/a	Kim (USA); W 5–3	Souza (BRA); W 7–6	—N/a		Plaza (MEX); W 19–17	1st place, gold medalist(s)
Martín Sio	Men's +80kg	Mora (DOM); W 24–10	Healy (USA); L 12–18	Did not advance	Montalvo (COL); W 17–11	Sansores (MEX); L 13–17	—N/a	4

Women

Athlete	Event	Round of 16	Quarterfinals	Semifinals	Repechage	Bronze Medal	Final	
Athlete	Event	Opposition Result	Opposition Result	Opposition Result	Opposition Result	Opposition Result	Opposition Result	Rank
Cristina Vazquez	Women's −49kg	Stambaugh (PUR); L 10–10 (Golden Point)	did not advance					
Gianella Evolo	Women's −57kg	Moya (PER); W 7–3	Mina (ECU); W 7–5	Park (CAN); L 1–14	—N/a	Lindo (CRC); L 3–10	—N/a	4
Alexis Arnoldt	Women's −67kg	Gallardo (CHI); W 9–7	McPherson (USA); L 7–25	Did not advance	—N/a	Acosta (CUB); L 7–10	—N/a	4

== Tennis ==
Argentina qualified 6 tennis players (3 men and 3 women).

Singles

Athlete	Event	Round of 64	Round of 32	Round of 16	Quarterfinals	Semifinals	Final / Bronze Medal	Rank
Athlete	Event	Opposition Score	Opposition Score	Opposition Score	Opposition Score	Opposition Score	Opposition Score	Rank
Guido Andreozzi	Men's	Bye	B Newman (BAH); W 6–0, 6–1	T Wild (BRA); W 6–2, 6–2	R Cid (DOM); W 6–1, 6–4	M Barrios (CHI); L 5–7, 6–4, 2–6	F Bagnis (ARG); W 6–4, 7–5	3rd place, bronze medalist(s)
Facundo Bagnis	Men's	Bye	W González (GUA); W 6–3, 6–3	Mi Redlicki (USA); W 6–4, 6–1	J Hernández (DOM); W 6–3, 6–2	J Menezes (BRA); L 6–4, 2–6, 4–6	G Andreozzi (ARG); L 4–6, 5–7	4
Francisco Cerúndolo	Men's	R Phillips (JAM); W 6–1, 6–3	G Escobar (ECU); W 6–3, 6–2	J Menezes (BRA); L 6–2, 3–6, 4–6	did not advance			
Victoria Bosio	Women's	—N/a	C Römer (ECU); W 7–5, 6–3	C Alves (BRA); L 1–6, 7–6, 4–6	did not advance			
Catalina Pella	Women's	—N/a	M Zacarías (MEX); L 2–6, 1–6	did not advance				
Nadia Podoroska	Women's	—N/a	F Brito (CHI); W 6–5, 7–5	M Reasco (ECU); W 6–3, 6–2	U Arconada (USA); W 6–4, 6–4	V Cepede Royg (PAR); W 6–3, 6–4	C Dolehide (USA); W 2–6, 6–3, 7–6	1st place, gold medalist(s)

Doubles

Athlete	Event	Round of 32	Round of 16	Quarterfinals	Semifinals	Final / Bronze Medal	Rank
Athlete	Event	Opposition Score	Opposition Score	Opposition Score	Opposition Score	Opposition Score	Rank
Guido Andreozzi; Facundo Bagnis	Men's	Bye	B Newman (BAH); J Roberts (BAH); W 6–2, 6–2	A González (COL); N Mejía (COL); W 6–2, 6–1	S Galdós (PER); JP Varillas (PER); W 6–1, 7–5	G Escobar (ECU); R Quiroz (ECU); L 4–6, 6–3, 8–10	2nd place, silver medalist(s)
Catalina Pella; Nadia Podoroska	Women's	M Morales (GUA); A Weedon (GUA); W 6–1, 6–1	C Alves (BRA); L Stefani (BRA); L 2–6, 2–6	did not advance			
Victoria Bosio; Francisco Cerúndolo	Mixed	—N/a	A Iamachkine (PER); S Galdós (PER); L 3–6, 1–6	did not advance			

== Triathlon ==
Individual

Athlete	Event	Swimming (1.5 km)	Transition 1	Biking (40.02 km)	Transition 2	Running (8.88 km)	Total	Rank
Luciano Franco Taccone	Men's	17:54	0:52	1:00:04	0:24	31:52	1:51:03	3rd place, bronze medalist(s)
Martin Miguel Bedirian	Men's	17:44	0:55	1:00:31	0:25	34:20	1:53:54	17
Romina Natali Baigioli	Women's	19:56	0:53	1:07:05	0:30	35:37	2:03:58	9
Delfina Alvarez	Women's	20:55	1:00	1:10:34	0:29	39:19	2:12:14	18

== Volleyball ==
=== Beach ===
Argentina qualified four beach volleyball athletes (two men and two women).

Athlete	Event	Group stage				Round of 16	Quarterfinal	Semifinal	Final / BM	
Athlete	Event	Opposition Result	Opposition Result	Opposition Result	Rank	Opposition Result	Opposition Result	Opposition Result	Opposition Result	Rank
Nicolás Capogrosso; Julián Azaad	Men's	Phillip – Stewart (TTO); W 2–0 (21–15, 21–7)	Escobar – Vargas (ESA); W 2–0 (21–12, 21–12)	Satterfield – Burik (USA); W 2–1 (19–21, 21–10, 15–12)	1 Q	Bye	Vieyto – Cairus (URU); W 2–1 (14–21, 21–14, 18–16)	Ontiveros – Virgen (MEX); L 1–2 (9–21, 21–17, 12–15)	Nusbaum – Plantinga (CAN); W 2–0 (21–17, 21–18)	3rd place, bronze medalist(s)
Ana Gallay; Fernanda Pereyra	Women's	Alvarado – Bethancourt (GUA); W 2–0 (21–13, 21–11)	Mendoza – Rodriguez (NCA); W 2–0 (21–12, 21–11)	Harnett – Lapointe (COL); W 2–1 (21–13, 20–22, 15–11)	1 Q	Bye	Mardones – Rivas (CHI); W 2–0 (22–20, 21–18)	Delís – Martínez (CUB); W 2–0 (21–19, 24–22)	Cook – Pardon (USA); L 1–2 (21–14, 20–22, 10–15)	2nd place, silver medalist(s)

=== Indoor ===
Summary

Team	Event	Group stage				Semifinal	Final / BM / Pl.	
Team	Event	Opposition Result	Opposition Result	Opposition Result	Rank	Opposition Result	Opposition Result	Rank
Argentina men	Men's tournament	Cuba; W 3–0	Peru; W 3–0	Puerto Rico; W 3–0	1 Q	Chile; W 3–1	Cuba; W 3–0	1st place, gold medalist(s)
Argentina women	Women's tournament	United States; W 3–2	Brazil; W 3–0	Puerto Rico; L 1–3	2 Q	Dominican Republic; L 1–3	Bronze medal match Brazil; W 3–0	3rd place, bronze medalist(s)

=== Men's tournament ===
Preliminary round

Pos	Team	Pld	W	L	Pts	SW	SL	SR	SPW	SPL	SPR	Qualification
1	Argentina	3	3	0	15	9	0	MAX	231	183	1.262	Semifinals
2	Cuba	3	2	1	9	6	4	1.500	245	214	1.145	Semifinals
3	Puerto Rico	3	1	2	5	4	7	0.571	228	245	0.931	5th–6th place match
4	Peru (H)	3	0	3	1	1	9	0.111	187	249	0.751	7th–8th place match

Source: Lima 2019
(H) Host

31 July 2019; 14:30	Cuba	0–3	Argentina	Callao Sports Center; Referees: Walter Vera (PER), Paulo Luis Beal (BRA)
31 July 2019; 14:30	(26–28, 22–25, 22–25); P2 P3			Callao Sports Center; Referees: Walter Vera (PER), Paulo Luis Beal (BRA)

1 August 2019; 12:30	Peru	0–3	Argentina	Callao Sports Center; Referees: Randy Sánchez (MEX), David Reyes (PUR)
1 August 2019; 12:30	(16–25, 25–27, 24–26); P2 P3			Callao Sports Center; Referees: Randy Sánchez (MEX), David Reyes (PUR)

2 August 2019; 12:30	Argentina	3–0	Puerto Rico	Callao Sports Center; Referees: Alejandro Muñoz )CHI), Paulo Luis Beal (BRA)
2 August 2019; 12:30	(25–18, 25–12, 25–18); P2 P3			Callao Sports Center; Referees: Alejandro Muñoz )CHI), Paulo Luis Beal (BRA)

Semifinal

3 August 2019; 20:30	Argentina	3–1	Chile	Callao Sports Center; Referees: David Reyes (PUR), Josmer Perez (DOM)
3 August 2019; 20:30	(25–21, 23–25, 28–26, 25–17); P2 P3			Callao Sports Center; Referees: David Reyes (PUR), Josmer Perez (DOM)

Gold medal match

4 August 2018; 21:00	Cuba	0–3	Argentina	Callao Sports Center; Referees: Walter Vera (PER), Paulo Luis Beal (BRA)
4 August 2018; 21:00	(20–25, 17–25, 20–25); P2 P3			Callao Sports Center; Referees: Walter Vera (PER), Paulo Luis Beal (BRA)

=== Women's tournament ===
Preliminary round

Pos	Team	Pld	W	L	Pts	SW	SL	SR	SPW	SPL	SPR	Qualification
1	Brazil	3	2	1	10	6	3	2.000	215	182	1.181	Semifinals
2	Argentina	3	2	1	9	7	5	1.400	266	256	1.039	Semifinals
3	Puerto Rico	3	1	2	6	5	7	0.714	238	268	0.888	5th–6th place match
4	United States	3	1	2	5	5	8	0.625	259	272	0.952	7th–8th place match

Source: Lima 2019

7 August 2019; 15:00	United States	2–3	Argentina	Callao Sports Center; Referees: Misael Galindo Reyez (COL), Andrew Robb (CAN)
7 August 2019; 15:00	(17–25, 17–25, 25–20, 25–18, 10–15); P2 P3			Callao Sports Center; Referees: Misael Galindo Reyez (COL), Andrew Robb (CAN)

8 August 2019; 13:00	Brazil	0–3	Argentina	Callao Sports Center; Referees: Andrew Robb (CAN), James Juscamaita (PER)
8 August 2019; 13:00	(23–25, 19–25, 23–25); P2 P3			Callao Sports Center; Referees: Andrew Robb (CAN), James Juscamaita (PER)

9 August 2019; 15:00	Puerto Rico	3–1	Argentina	Callao Sports Center
9 August 2019; 15:00	(21–25, 25–16, 26–24, 25–23); P2 P3			Callao Sports Center

Semifinal

10 August 2019; 20:30	Dominican Republic	3–1	Argentina	Callao Sports Center; Referees: Héctor Ortiz (PUR), James Juscamaita (PER)
10 August 2019; 20:30	(25–18, 26–28, 25–13, 25–21); P2 P3			Callao Sports Center; Referees: Héctor Ortiz (PUR), James Juscamaita (PER)

Bronze medal match

11 August 2019; 9:00	Brazil	0–3	Argentina	Callao Sports Center; Referees: Yuri Ramírez (DOM), Misael Galindo (COL)
11 August 2019; 9:00	(24–26, 20–25, 21–25); P2 P3			Callao Sports Center; Referees: Yuri Ramírez (DOM), Misael Galindo (COL)

== Water polo ==
Summary

Team	Event	Preliminary round				Quarterfinal	Semifinal	Final / BM / Pl.	
Team	Event	Opposition Result	Opposition Result	Opposition Result	Rank	Opposition Result	Opposition Result	Opposition Result	Rank
Argentina men	Men's tournament	Mexico; W 13–11	Peru; W 12–6	Brazil; L 7–12	2 Q	Cuba; W 9–7	United States; L 1–17	Bronze medal match Brazil; L 6–9	4

=== Men's tournament ===
Preliminary round

Pos	Team	Pld	W	D	L	GF	GA	GD	Pts	Qualification
1	Brazil	3	3	0	0	36	14	+22	6	Quarterfinals
2	Argentina	3	2	0	1	32	29	+3	4	Quarterfinals
3	Mexico	3	1	0	2	30	31	−1	2	Quarterfinals
4	Peru (H)	3	0	0	3	16	40	−24	0	Quarterfinals

Source: Lima 2019
Rules for classification: 1) points; 2) head-to-head points; 3) head-to-head goal difference; 4) head-to-head number of goals scored; 5) goal difference.
(H) Hosts

4 August 2019; 19:30	Report	Mexico	11–13	Argentina	Villa María del Triunfo Aquatic Centre, Lima; Referees: Marie-Claude Deslières (CAN); Boris Margeta (SLO)
4 August 2019; 19:30	Report	Score by quarters: 0–3, 3–6, 5–3, 3–1			Villa María del Triunfo Aquatic Centre, Lima; Referees: Marie-Claude Deslières (CAN); Boris Margeta (SLO)
4 August 2019; 19:30	Report	Juárez 3	Goals	Camnasio 5	Villa María del Triunfo Aquatic Centre, Lima; Referees: Marie-Claude Deslières (CAN); Boris Margeta (SLO)

5 August 2019; 19:30	Report	Peru	6–12	Argentina	Villa María del Triunfo Aquatic Centre, Lima; Referees: Reinel Castillo (PUR); Steven Rotsart (USA)
5 August 2019; 19:30	Report	Score by quarters: 1–3, 2–2, 1–5, 2–2			Villa María del Triunfo Aquatic Centre, Lima; Referees: Reinel Castillo (PUR); Steven Rotsart (USA)
5 August 2019; 19:30	Report	Rodríguez, Villar 2	Goals	Yáñez 4	Villa María del Triunfo Aquatic Centre, Lima; Referees: Reinel Castillo (PUR); Steven Rotsart (USA)

6 August 2019; 19:30	Report	Brazil	12–7	Argentina	Villa María del Triunfo Aquatic Centre, Lima; Referees: Arkadii Voevodin (RUS); Juan Menéndez (CUB)
6 August 2019; 19:30	Report	Score by quarters: 6–0, 1–1, 3–2, 2–4			Villa María del Triunfo Aquatic Centre, Lima; Referees: Arkadii Voevodin (RUS); Juan Menéndez (CUB)
6 August 2019; 19:30	Report	Guimarães 4	Goals	Camnasio, Carabantes 2	Villa María del Triunfo Aquatic Centre, Lima; Referees: Arkadii Voevodin (RUS); Juan Menéndez (CUB)

Quarterfinal

8 August 2019; 16:30	Report	Cuba	7–9	Argentina	Villa María del Triunfo Aquatic Centre, Lima; Referees: Boris Margeta (SLO); Daniel Vázquez (MEX)
8 August 2019; 16:30	Report	Score by quarters: 1–2, 2–3, 2–2, 2–2			Villa María del Triunfo Aquatic Centre, Lima; Referees: Boris Margeta (SLO); Daniel Vázquez (MEX)
8 August 2019; 16:30	Report	Carales 5	Goals	four players 2	Villa María del Triunfo Aquatic Centre, Lima; Referees: Boris Margeta (SLO); Daniel Vázquez (MEX)

Semifinal

9 August 2019; 19:30	Report	Argentina	1–17	United States	Villa María del Triunfo Aquatic Centre, Lima; Referees: Gerardo Arellano (MEX); Leonardo González (VEN)
9 August 2019; 19:30	Report	Score by quarters: 0–4, 0–4, 1–6, 0–3			Villa María del Triunfo Aquatic Centre, Lima; Referees: Gerardo Arellano (MEX); Leonardo González (VEN)
9 August 2019; 19:30	Report	Camnasio 1	Goals	Hooper 7	Villa María del Triunfo Aquatic Centre, Lima; Referees: Gerardo Arellano (MEX); Leonardo González (VEN)

Bronze medal match

10 August 2019; 18:00	Report	(bronze) Brazil	9–6	Argentina	Villa María del Triunfo Aquatic Centre, Lima; Referees: Steven Rotsart (USA); Juan Menéndez (CUB)
10 August 2019; 18:00	Report	Score by quarters: 2–1, 2–0, 2–2, 3–3			Villa María del Triunfo Aquatic Centre, Lima; Referees: Steven Rotsart (USA); Juan Menéndez (CUB)
10 August 2019; 18:00	Report	P. Real, R. Real 2	Goals	Echenique 2	Villa María del Triunfo Aquatic Centre, Lima; Referees: Steven Rotsart (USA); Juan Menéndez (CUB)

== Water skiing ==
Argentina qualified 5 athletes (4 men and 1 woman).

Water Skiing
Men

Athlete	Event	Preliminaries		Final				
Athlete	Event	Total	Rank	Slalom	Jump	Tricks	Total	Rank
Ignacio Giorgis	Slalom	4.00/58/12.00	8	did not advance				
Ignacio Giorgis	Tricks	5890	10	did not advance				
Ignacio Giorgis	Jump	138	8 Q	—N/a	0	—N/a	0	8
Tobías Giorgis	Slalom	2.50/58/11.25	5	did not advance				
Tobías Giorgis	Tricks	6360	9	did not advance				
Tobías Giorgis	Jump	183	6 Q	—N/a	194	—N/a	194	5
Ignacio Giorgis	Overall	1708.23	10	did not advance				
Tobías Giorgis	Overall	2179.47	5 Q	3.50/58/11.25	8580	194	2524.28	3rd place, bronze medalist(s)

Women

Athlete	Event	Preliminaries		Final				
Athlete	Event	Total	Rank	Slalom	Jump	Tricks	Total	Rank
Paloma Giordano	Slalom	0.50/55/12.00	4	did not advance				
Paloma Giordano	Tricks	6240	7	did not advance				
Violeta Mociulsky	Slalom	2.00/55/12.00	2	did not advance				
Violeta Mociulsky	Tricks	3130	12	did not advance				
Violeta Mociulsky	Jump	92	7	did not advance				
Violeta Mociulsky	Overall	1338.64	8	did not advance				

Wakeboard

Athlete	Event	Semifinal		Last chance qualifier		Final	
Athlete	Event	Total	Rank	Total	Rank	Total	Rank
Ulf Ditsch	Men's wakeboard	82.45	1 Q	—N/a		78.78	2nd place, silver medalist(s)
Eugenia De Armas	Women's wakeboard	72.89	1 Q	—N/a		82.67	1st place, gold medalist(s)

== Weightlifting ==
Men

Athlete	Event	Snatch		Clean & jerk		Total	
Athlete	Event	Weight	Rank	Weight	Rank	Weight	Rank
Maximiliano Kienitz	–96 kg	148	10	180	10	328	10

Women

Athlete	Event	Snatch		Clean & jerk		Total	
Athlete	Event	Weight	Rank	Weight	Rank	Weight	Rank
Abril De Cándido	–55 kg	74	8	97	8	171	8
Tatiana Ullua	–59 kg	87	10	104	9	181	9
María Luz Casadevall	–64 kg	80	7	108	8	188	7
Carla Santillán	–87 kg	90	8	117	8	207	8

== Wrestling ==
Key:

- VT – Victory by fall.
- PP – Decision by points – the loser with technical points.
- PO – Decision by points – the loser without technical points.
- SP – Technical superiority – the loser with technical points and a margin of victory of at least 9 (Greco-Roman) or 10 (freestyle) points.
- ST – Great superiority – the loser without technical points and a margin of victory of at least 8 (Greco-Roman) or 10 (freestyle) points.
- VA – Decision by withdrawal

Men

Athlete	Event	Round of 16	Quarterfinals	Semifinals	Final / BM	Rank
Athlete	Event	Opposition Score	Opposition Score	Opposition Score	Opposition Score	Rank
Luciano del Río	Greco-Roman 130 kg	—N/a	M López (CUB); L 0–8ST	Did not advance	Bronze medal bout Y Acosta (CHI); L 0–9^{SP}	4
Agustín Destribats	Freestyle 65 kg	—N/a	W Rodríguez (VEN); W 17–10^{PP}	A Valdés (CUB); L 0–4^{VT}	Bronze medal bout J Eierman (USA); L 4–15^{SP}	4
Iván Llano	Freestyle 74 kg	—N/a	F Gómez (PUR); L 0–10ST	Did not advance	Bronze medal bout J Balfour (CAN); L 0–10ST	4
Ricardo Báez	Freestyle 86 kg	A Moore (CAN); L 0–10ST	did not advance			

Women

Athlete	Event	Quarterfinals	Semifinals	Final / BM	Rank
Athlete	Event	Opposition Score	Opposition Score	Opposition Score	Rank
Patricia Bermúdez	Freestyle 50 kg	J Mollocana (COL); L 2–9^{PP}	did not advance		

== See also ==
- Argentina at the 2019 Parapan American Games
- Argentina at the 2020 Summer Olympics
