= Basque pelota at the 2019 Pan American Games – Men's doubles fronton leather ball =

Basque pelota – Men's doubles fronton leather ball at the 2019 Pan American Games
- Venue: Villa María del Triunfo Center
- Dates: 4–10 August
- Competitors: 10 from 5 nations

Medalists
Gold medal	Pablo Fusto; Alfredo Villegas	Argentina
Silver medal	Armando Chappi; Frendy Fernández	Cuba
Bronze medal	Rodrigo Ledesma; Miguel Urrutia	Mexico

The men's doubles fronton leather ball basque pelota event at the 2019 Pan American Games was held from 4–10 August at the Basque pelota courts in the Villa María del Triunfo Sports Center in Lima, Peru. The Argentine team won the gold medal, after defeating the Cuban team in the final.

== Results ==
=== Preliminary round ===
The preliminary stage consisted of a single round robin group where every doubles team played each other once. At the end of this stage, the first two teams then played a final match for the gold medal, while the third and fourth played for bronze.

Pos	Team	Pld	W	L	PF	PA	PD	Pts
1	Argentina Pablo Fusto Alfredo Villegas	4	4	0	120	52	+68	12
2	Cuba Armando Chappi Frendy Fernández	4	3	1	105	77	+28	10
3	Mexico Rodrigo Ledesma Miguel Urrutia	4	2	2	96	81	+15	8
4	United States Agusti Brugues José Huarte	4	1	3	73	100	−27	6
5	Peru Daniel Fernández Edson Velásquez	4	0	4	36	120	−84	4

Updated to match(es) played on 10 August 2019. Source: Lima 2019

All times are local (UTC−5)

4 August; 11:18	Fusto – A. Villegas (Argentina)	2–0	(Cuba) Chappi – Fernández	Villa María del Triunfo Sports Center; Referees: Leonardo Mondada (URU), Alejandro Varela (URU)
4 August; 11:18	(15–6, 15–9); Report			Villa María del Triunfo Sports Center; Referees: Leonardo Mondada (URU), Alejandro Varela (URU)

4 August; 12:17	Brugues – Huarte (United States)	0–2	(Mexico) Ledesma – Urrutia	Villa María del Triunfo Sports Center; Referees: Alfonso Romero (CHI), Roberto Jara (CHI)
4 August; 12:17	(7–15, 5–15); Report			Villa María del Triunfo Sports Center; Referees: Alfonso Romero (CHI), Roberto Jara (CHI)

5 August; 11:29	(Argentina) Fusto – A. Villegas	2–0	Brugues – Huarte (United States)	Villa María del Triunfo Sports Center; Referees: Rolando Casteleiro (CUB), Leonardo Mondada (URU)
5 August; 11:29	(15–8, 15–2); Report			Villa María del Triunfo Sports Center; Referees: Rolando Casteleiro (CUB), Leonardo Mondada (URU)

5 August; 12:19	(Cuba) Chappi – Fernández	2–0	Fernández – Velásquez (Peru)	Villa María del Triunfo Sports Center; Referees: Leonardo Mondada (URU), Alejandro Varela (URU)
5 August; 12:19	(15–2, 15–5); Report			Villa María del Triunfo Sports Center; Referees: Leonardo Mondada (URU), Alejandro Varela (URU)

6 August; 11:41	(Mexico) Ledesma – Urrutia	0–2	Chappi – Fernández (Cuba)	Villa María del Triunfo Sports Center; Referees: Leonardo Mondada (URU), Juan Pablo Amaya (PER)
6 August; 11:41	(13–15, 6–15); Report			Villa María del Triunfo Sports Center; Referees: Leonardo Mondada (URU), Juan Pablo Amaya (PER)

6 August; 12:53	(Peru) Fernández – Velásquez	0–2	Fusto – A. Villegas (Argentina)	Villa María del Triunfo Sports Center; Referees: Andrés Caballero (CUB), Luis Alberto Sánchez (PER)
6 August; 12:53	(6–15, 4–15); Report			Villa María del Triunfo Sports Center; Referees: Andrés Caballero (CUB), Luis Alberto Sánchez (PER)

7 August; 11:14	(Argentina) Fusto – A. Villegas	2–0	Ledesma – Urrutia (Mexico)	Villa María del Triunfo Sports Center; Referees: Alejandro Varela (URU), Juan Pablo Amaya (PER)
7 August; 11:14	(15–10, 15–7); Report			Villa María del Triunfo Sports Center; Referees: Alejandro Varela (URU), Juan Pablo Amaya (PER)

7 August; 12:11	(United States) Brugues – Huarte	2–0	Fernández – Velásquez (Peru)	Villa María del Triunfo Sports Center; Referees: Pedro López (MEX), Juan Pablo Amaya (PER)
7 August; 12:11	(15–4, 15–6); Report			Villa María del Triunfo Sports Center; Referees: Pedro López (MEX), Juan Pablo Amaya (PER)

8 August; 10:00	(Cuba) Chappi – Fernández	2–0	Brugues – Huarte (United States)	Villa María del Triunfo Sports Center; Referees: Leonardo Mondada (URU), Jorge Balbi (ARG)
8 August; 10:00	(15–14, 15–7); Report			Villa María del Triunfo Sports Center; Referees: Leonardo Mondada (URU), Jorge Balbi (ARG)

8 August; 10:54	(Mexico) Ledesma – Urrutia	2–0	Fernández – Velásquez (Peru)	Villa María del Triunfo Sports Center; Referees: Jorge Balbi, (ARG), Leonardo Mondada (URU)
8 August; 10:54	(15–6, 15–3); Report			Villa María del Triunfo Sports Center; Referees: Jorge Balbi, (ARG), Leonardo Mondada (URU)

=== Bronze medal match ===
9 August; 11:00	(Mexico) Ledesma – Urrutia	2–0	Brugues – Huarte (United States)	Villa María del Triunfo Sports Center; Referees: Leonardo Mondada (URU), Alejandro Varela (URU)
9 August; 11:00	(15–11, 15–13); Report			Villa María del Triunfo Sports Center; Referees: Leonardo Mondada (URU), Alejandro Varela (URU)

=== Gold medal match ===
10 August; 15:16	(Argentina) Fusto – A. Villegas	2–0	Chappi – Fernández (Cuba)	Villa María del Triunfo Sports Center; Referees: Leonardo Mondada (URU), Juan Pablo Amaya (PER)
10 August; 15:16	(15–6, 15–11); Report			Villa María del Triunfo Sports Center; Referees: Leonardo Mondada (URU), Juan Pablo Amaya (PER)
