= Basque pelota at the 2019 Pan American Games – Men's individual Peruvian fronton =

Basque pelota – Men's individual Peruvian fronton at the 2019 Pan American Games
- Venue: Villa María del Triunfo Center
- Dates: 4–10 August
- Competitors: 5 from 5 nations

Medalists
Gold medal	Cristopher Martínez	Peru
Silver medal	Guillermo Osorio	Argentina
Bronze medal	Isaac Perez	Mexico

The men's individual Peruvian fronton basque pelota event at the 2019 Pan American Games was held from 4–10 August at the Basque pelota courts in the Villa María del Triunfo Sports Center in Lima, Peru. Cristopher Martínez won the gold medal, after defeating Guillermo Osorio in the final.

== Results ==
=== Preliminary round ===
The preliminary stage consisted of 5 competitors where everybody played each other once. At the end of this stage, the top 4 competitors advanced to the medal round.

Pos	Team	Pld	W	L	PF	PA	PD	Pts
1	Peru Cristopher Martínez	4	4	0	120	54	+66	12
2	Argentina Guillermo Osorio	4	3	1	112	73	+39	10
3	United States Salvador Espinoza	4	1	3	92	121	−29	6
4	Mexico Isaac Perez	4	1	3	95	125	−30	6
5	Cuba Alejandro González	4	1	3	78	124	−46	6

Updated to match(es) played on 18 September 2019. Source: Lima 2019

All times are local (UTC-5)

4 August; 13:09	Cristopher Martínez (Peru)	2–0	(Cuba) Alejandro González	Villa María del Triunfo Sports Center; Referees: Jorge Enrique Carpio León (PER)
4 August; 13:09	(15–4, 15–4); Report			Villa María del Triunfo Sports Center; Referees: Jorge Enrique Carpio León (PER)

4 August; 13:09	Isaac Perez (Mexico)	0-2	(Argentina) Guillermo Osorio	Villa María del Triunfo Sports Center; Referees: Diego Gonzalo Tang Voysest (PER)
4 August; 13:09	(8-15, 7-15); Report			Villa María del Triunfo Sports Center; Referees: Diego Gonzalo Tang Voysest (PER)

5 August; 12:45	Cristopher Martínez (Peru)	2-0	(Mexico) Isaac Perez	Villa María del Triunfo Sports Center; Referees: Enrique Manuel Benavides Guadalupe (PER)
5 August; 12:45	(15-4, 15-3); Report			Villa María del Triunfo Sports Center; Referees: Enrique Manuel Benavides Guadalupe (PER)

5 August; 13:25	Alejandro González (Cuba)	0-2	(United States) Salvador Espinoza	Villa María del Triunfo Sports Center; Referees: Jorge Enrique Carpio León (PER)
5 August; 13:25	(13-15, 9-15); Report			Villa María del Triunfo Sports Center; Referees: Jorge Enrique Carpio León (PER)

6 August; 12:06	Guillermo Osorio (Argentina)	2-0	(Cuba) Alejandro Gonzlez	Villa María del Triunfo Sports Center; Referees: Diego Gonzalo Tang Voysest (PER)
6 August; 12:06	(15-12, 15-4); Report			Villa María del Triunfo Sports Center; Referees: Diego Gonzalo Tang Voysest (PER)

6 August; 12:07	Salvador Espinoza (United States)	0-2	(Peru) Cristopher Martínez	Villa María del Triunfo Sports Center; Referees: Jorge Enrique Carpio León (PER)
6 August; 12:07	(7-15, 10-15); Report			Villa María del Triunfo Sports Center; Referees: Jorge Enrique Carpio León (PER)

7 August; 12:09	Isaac Perez (Mexico)	2-1	(United States) Salvador Espinoza	Villa María del Triunfo Sports Center; Referees: Enrique Manuel Benavides Guadalupe (PER)
7 August; 12:09	(15-10, 14-15, 10-8); Report			Villa María del Triunfo Sports Center; Referees: Enrique Manuel Benavides Guadalupe (PER)

7 August; 12:10	Cristopher Martínez (Peru)	2-0	(Argentina) Guillermo Osorio	Villa María del Triunfo Sports Center; Referees: Jorge Enrique Carpio León (PER)
7 August; 12:10	(15-13, 15-9); Report			Villa María del Triunfo Sports Center; Referees: Jorge Enrique Carpio León (PER)

8 August; 12:31	Alejandro González (Cuba)	2-1	(Mexico) Isaac Perez	Villa María del Triunfo Sports Center; Referees: Enrique Manuel Benavides Guadalupe (PER)
8 August; 12:31	(15-13, 7-15, 10-6); Report			Villa María del Triunfo Sports Center; Referees: Enrique Manuel Benavides Guadalupe (PER)

8 August; 12:37	Guillermo Osorio (Argentina)	2-0	(United States) Salvador Espinoza	Villa María del Triunfo Sports Center; Referees: Jorge Enrique Carpio León (PER)
8 August; 12:37	(15-9, 15-3); Report			Villa María del Triunfo Sports Center; Referees: Jorge Enrique Carpio León (PER)

=== Bronze medal match ===
9 August; 12:01	Salvador Espinoza (United States)	1-2	(Mexico) Isaac Perez	Villa María del Triunfo Sports Center; Referees: Miguel Adrián Fernández Medicci (VEN)
9 August; 12:01	(12-15, 15-11, 7-10); Report			Villa María del Triunfo Sports Center; Referees: Miguel Adrián Fernández Medicci (VEN)

=== Gold medal match ===
10 August; 13:31	Cristopher Martínez (Peru)	2-0	(Argentina) Guillermo Osorio	Villa María del Triunfo Sports Center; Referees: Enrique Manuel Benavides Guadalupe (PER)
10 August; 13:31	(15-6, 15-11); Report			Villa María del Triunfo Sports Center; Referees: Enrique Manuel Benavides Guadalupe (PER)
