= Vera Protzen =

German-born Argentine dressage rider (1975–2020)

Personal information
- Full name: Vera Beatriz Protzen
- Nationality: Argentinian
- Born: 10 February 1975 Germany
- Died: 2 November 2020 (aged 45) Buenos Aires, Argentina

Sport
- Sport: Dressage

Achievements and titles
- World finals: 2019 Pan American Games
Medal record
Equestrian
Representing Argentina
South American Games
Gold medal – first place	2006 Buenos Aires	Team Dressage
Gold medal – first place	2006 Buenos Aires	Individual Dressage
Silver medal – second place	2014 Santiago	Team Dressage

Vera Beatriz Protzen (10 February 1975 – 2 November 2020) was a German-born Argentinian Dressage rider. She competed twice at the Pan American Games; at the 2007 Pan American Games in Rio de Janeiro, where she came 5th in the finals, and at the 2019 Pan American Games in Lima where she came individual 7th in the finals. Vera won team and individual gold during the 2006 South American Games in Buenos Aires and team silver at the 2014 South American Games in Quillota, Chile.

On 2 November 2020 Vera got involved in a riding accident on her six year old horse and was discovered in the field at her stable. She was found with a serious brain trauma and was hospitalised to the Capilla del Señor Hospital in Buenos Aires, where she died.
