= Peru at the 2019 Pan American Games =

- IOC code: PER
- NOC: Peruvian Olympic Committee

in Lima, Peru 26 July–11 August 2019
- Competitors: 599 in 17 sports
- Flag bearers: Stefano Peschiera (opening); Gladys Tejeda (closing)
- Medals Ranked 10th: Gold 11 Silver 7 Bronze 23 Total 41

Pan American Games appearances (overview)
- 1951; 1955; 1959; 1963; 1967; 1971; 1975; 1979; 1983; 1987; 1991; 1995; 1999; 2003; 2007; 2011; 2015; 2019; 2023

Peru was the host nation of the 2019 Pan American Games in Lima, from July 26 to August 11, 2019.

Lima, the capital city, is the venue of the Games. The Peruvian team consisted of 599 athletes (315 men and 284 women).

During the opening ceremony of the games, sailor Stefano Peschiera carried the flag of the country as part of the parade of nations.

== Medalists ==
The following Peruvian competitors won medals at the games.

Medal	Name	Sport	Event	Date
Gold	Gladys Tejeda	Athletics	Women's marathon	July 27
Gold	Cristhian Pacheco	Athletics	Men's marathon	July 27
Gold	Diego Elías	Squash	Men's singles	July 27
Gold	Natalia Cuglievan	Water skiing	Women's tricks	July 29
Gold	Benoit Clemente	Surfing	Men's Longboard	August 4
Gold	Daniella Rosas	Surfing	Women's Open surf	August 4
Gold	Lucca Mesinas	Surfing	Men's Open surf	August 4
Gold	Carlos Lam; Jhon Trebejo; Oliver del Castillo	Karate	Men's team kata	August 9
Gold	Claudia Suárez	Basque pelota	Women's individual peruvian fronton	August 10
Gold	Cristopher Martínez	Basque pelota	Men's individual peruvian fronton	August 10
Gold	Alexandra Grande	Karate	Women's 61 kg	August 10
Silver	Hugo del Castillo	Taekwondo	Men's poomsae individual	July 27
Silver	Marcela Castillo	Taekwondo	Women's poomsae individual	July 27
Silver	Kimberly García	Athletics	Women's 20 kilometres walk	August 4
Silver	Vania Torres	Surfing	Women's SUP surf	August 4
Silver	Tamil Martino	Surfing	Men's SUP surf	August 4
Silver	María Fernanda Reyes	Surfing	Women's Longboard	August 4
Silver	Alonso Wong	Judo	Men's 73 kg	August 9
Bronze	Luis Bardalez	Weightlifting	Men's 67 kg	July 27
Bronze	Diego Elías; Alonso Escudero	Squash	Men's doubles	July 27
Bronze	Renzo Saux; Ariana Vera	Taekwondo	Mixed poomsae pairs	July 28
Bronze	Leodan Pezo	Boxing	Men's 60 kg	July 30
Bronze	José María Lúcar	Boxing	Men's 91 kg	July 30
Bronze	Marko Carrillo	Shooting	Men's 25 metre rapid fire pistol	August 1
Bronze	Francis Cachique; Robinson Ruiz; Ruben Salinas	Cycling	Men's team sprint	August 1
Bronze	Itzel Delgado	Surfing	Men's SUP race	August 2
Bronze	Nicolás Pacheco	Shooting	Men's skeet	August 3
Bronze	Sergio Galdós; Juan Pablo Varillas	Tennis	Men's doubles	August 3
Bronze	Anastasia Iamachkine; Sergio Galdós	Tennis	Mixed doubles	August 3
Bronze	Nilton Soto	Wrestling	Men's Greco-Roman 67 kg	August 7
Bronze	Thalía Mallqui	Wrestling	Women's Freestyle 50 kg	August 8
Bronze	Nathaly Paredes; Mía Rodríguez	Basque pelota	Women's doubles frontenis	August 9
Bronze	María Belén Bazo	Sailing	Women's RS:X	August 9
Bronze	Mariano Wong	Karate	Men's individual kata	August 9
Bronze	Ingrid Aranda	Karate	Women's individual kata	August 9
Bronze	Saida Salcedo; Andrea Almarza; Sol Romaní	Karate	Women's team kata	August 9
Bronze	Renzo Sanguineti	Sailing	Sunfish	August 10
Bronze	Mario Bazán	Athletics	Men's 3000 metres steeplechase	August 10
Bronze	Yuta Galarreta	Judo	Men's 90 kg	August 10
Bronze	Isabel Aco	Karate	Women's +68 kg	August 11
Bronze	Yuliana Bolívar	Judo	Women's +78 kg	August 11

Medals by sport
Sport	1st place, gold medalist(s)	2nd place, silver medalist(s)	3rd place, bronze medalist(s)	Total
Surfing	3	3	1	7
Athletics	2	1	1	4
Karate	2	0	4	6
Basque pelota	2	0	1	3
Squash	1	0	1	2
Water skiing	1	0	0	1
Taekwondo	0	2	1	3
Judo	0	1	2	3
Boxing	0	0	2	2
Sailing	0	0	2	2
Shooting	0	0	2	2
Tennis	0	0	2	2
Wrestling	0	0	2	2
Cycling	0	0	1	1
Weightlifting	0	0	1	1
Total	11	7	23	41

Medals by day
Day	Date	1st place, gold medalist(s)	2nd place, silver medalist(s)	3rd place, bronze medalist(s)	Total
1	July 27	3	2	2	7
2	July 28	0	0	1	1
3	July 29	1	0	0	1
4	July 30	0	0	2	2
5	July 31	0	0	0	0
6	August 1	0	0	1	1
7	August 2	0	0	1	1
8	August 3	0	0	3	3
9	August 4	3	4	0	7
10	August 5	0	0	0	0
11	August 6	0	0	0	0
12	August 7	0	0	1	1
13	August 8	0	0	0	0
14	August 9	1	1	5	7
15	August 10	3	0	3	6
16	August 11	0	0	2	2
Total		11	7	22	40

Medals by gender
Gender	1st place, gold medalist(s)	2nd place, silver medalist(s)	3rd place, bronze medalist(s)	Total
Female	5	4	7	16
Male	6	3	14	23
Mixed	0	0	2	2
Total	11	7	23	41

== Competitors ==
The following is the list of number of competitors (per gender) participating at the games per sport/discipline.

Sport	Men	Women	Total
Archery	2	3	5
Artistic swimming	—N/a	9	9
Badminton	4	4	8
Baseball	24	0	24
Basque pelota	8	6	14
Bodybuilding	1	1	2
Bowling	2	2	4
Boxing	8	3	11
Canoeing	3	6	9
Cycling	14	8	22
Diving	2	3	5
Equestrian	8	2	10
Fencing	9	9	18
Field hockey	16	16	32
Football	18	18	36
Golf	2	2	4
Gymnastics	1	0	1
Handball	14	14	28
Judo	7	7	14
Karate	9	9	18
Modern pentathlon	2	2	4
Racquetball	3	0	3
Roller sports	3	2	5
Rowing	5	4	9
Rugby sevens	0	12	12
Sailing	10	7	17
Shooting	9	9	18
Softball	15	15	30
Squash	3	3	6
Surfing	5	5	10
Table tennis	3	3	6
Taekwondo	7	6	13
Tennis	3	3	6
Triathlon	2	2	4
Volleyball	14	14	28
Water polo	11	11	22
Water skiing	3	2	5
Weightlifting	6	6	12
Wrestling	12	6	18
Total	268	234	502

== Archery ==
Men

Athlete	Event	Ranking round		Round of 32	Round of 16	Quarterfinal	Semifinal	Final / BM	
Athlete	Event	Score	Rank	Opposition Result	Opposition Result	Opposition Result	Opposition Result	Opposition Result	Rank
Willian O'Brien	Individual recurve	647	23	Puentes (CUB); L 0–6	Did not advance				
Gonzalo Hermoza	Individual compound	664	10	—N/a	Pizarro (PUR); L 138–146	Did not advance			

Women

Athlete	Event	Ranking round		Round of 32	Round of 16	Quarterfinal	Semifinal	Final / BM	
Athlete	Event	Score	Rank	Opposition Result	Opposition Result	Opposition Result	Opposition Result	Opposition Result	Rank
Pamela Velasquez Cuadros	Individual recurve	622	14	Sarduy (CUB); L 2–6	Did not advance				
Aleska Burga García	Individual recurve	582	28	Avitia (MEX); L 1–7	Did not advance				
Beatriz Aliaga	Individual compound	675	8	—N/a	Meleti (BRA); W 141–133	López (COL); L 142–145	Did not advance		

Misto

Atleta	Evento	Fase de ranqueamento		Oitavas-de-final	Quartas-de-final	Semifinais	Final / MB	Rank
Atleta	Evento	Pontuação	Chaveamento	Adversário Pontuação	Adversário Pontuação	Adversário Pontuação	Adversário Pontuação	Rank
Pamela Velasquez; Willian O'Brien	Team recurve	1269	9	Aguilar / Bassi (CHI); L 0–6	Did not advance			
Gonzalo Hermoza; Beatriz Aliaga	Team compound	1339	8	—N/a	Muñoz / López (COL); L 148–154	Did not advance		

== Artistic swimming ==
Athlete	Event	Technical swim		Free swim		Total	
Athlete	Event	Score	Rank	Score	Rank	Score	Rank
Carla Morales; Cielomar Romero	Duet	70.8877	9	74.3667	9	145.2544	9
Yamile Carrasco; Maria Ccoyllo; Mariafe Lopez; Carla Morales; Tania Patiño; Andrea Phillips Lescano; Sandy Quiroz; Cielomar Romero; Valeria Romero	Team	73.0739	6	75.8667	6	148.9406	6

== Badminton ==
=== Singles ===
Athlete	Event	Round of 64	Round of 32	Round of 16	Quarter-finals	Semi-finals	Final / BM	
Athlete	Event	Opposition Score	Opposition Score	Opposition Score	Opposition Score	Opposition Score	Opposition Score	Rank
Daniel la Torre Regal	Men	Bye	Muñoz (MEX); L 17–21, 11–21	Did not advance				17
José Guevara	Men	Javier (DOM); W 21–15, 21–19	López (MEX); L 16–21, 20–22	Did not advance				17
Daniela Macías	Women	Bye	Naranjo (CHI); W 21–7, 21–4	Valero Mata (MEX); W 21–11, 21–12	Wang (USA); L 10–21, 12–21	Did not advance		5
Ines Lucia Castillo Salazar	Women	Bye	Pie (DOM); W 21–10, 21–2	Silva (BRA); L 18–21, 8–21	Did not advance			9

=== Doubles ===
Athlete	Event	Round of 32	Round of 16	Quarter-finals	Semi-finals	Final / BM	
Athlete	Event	Opposition Score	Opposition Score	Opposition Score	Opposition Score	Opposition Score	Rank
José Guevara; Daniel la Torre Regal	Men	Bye		Farias / Farias (BRA); L 12–21, 21–19, 12–21	Did not advance		5
Mario Cuba; Diego Mini	Men	Bye	Araya / León (CHI); W 21–12, 21–13	Ho-Shue / Yakura (CAN); L 13–21, 10–21	Did not advance		5
Daniela Macías; Dánica Nishimura	Women	Bye		Lima / Lima (BRA); L 21–15, 15–21, 22–24	Did not advance		5
Ines Lucia Castillo Salazar; Paula la Torre Regal	Women	Bye	Scott / Williams (BAR); W 21–12, 21–13	Honderich / Tsai (CAN); L 3–21, 3–21	Did not advance		5
Diego Mini; Dánica Nishimura	Mixed	Oliva / Gualdi (ARG); W 21–16, 21–11	López / Solis (MEX); W 21–10, 21–18	Shu / Obañana (USA); L 22–20, 12–21, 16–21	Did not advance		5
Maria Cuba; Daniela Macías	Mixed	Chew / Chen (USA); L 17–21, 17–21	Did not advance				17

== Baseball ==
Peru qualified a men's team of 24 athletes automatically as host nation.

Group A

	GP	W	L	RS	RA	DIFF
Puerto Rico	3	3	0	13	5	+8
Nicaragua	3	2	1	17	9	+8
Dominican Republic	3	1	2	13	9	+4
Peru	3	0	3	4	24	−14

Qualified for the Super round

July 29; 19:05	Dominican Republic	10–3	Peru	Baseball Stadium, Lima; Attendance: 2,798
July 29; 19:05		Boxscore		Baseball Stadium, Lima; Attendance: 2,798

July 31; 19:05	Puerto Rico	4–1	Peru	Baseball Stadium, Lima; Attendance: 2,850
July 31; 19:05		Boxscore		Baseball Stadium, Lima; Attendance: 2,850

August 1; 19:05	Peru	0–10 (F/7)	Nicaragua	Baseball Stadium, Lima; Attendance: 1,994
August 1; 19:05		Boxscore		Baseball Stadium, Lima; Attendance: 1,994

Seventh place match

August 2; 10:05	Peru	1–20 (F/5)	Argentina	Baseball Stadium, Lima; Attendance: 1,125
August 2; 10:05		Boxscore		Baseball Stadium, Lima; Attendance: 1,125

== Basque pelota ==
Men

Athlete	Event	Preliminary round					Semifinal	Final / BM	Rank
Athlete	Event	Match 1	Match 2	Match 3	Match 4	Rank	Semifinal	Final / BM	Rank
Athlete	Event	Opposition Score	Opposition Score	Opposition Score	Opposition Score	Rank	Opposition Score	Opposition Score	Rank
André Bellido; Edson Velásquez	Doubles trinquete rubber ball	D García (MEX); I Pérez (MEX); L 3–15, 6–15	Sa Andreasen (ARG); Se Andreasen (ARG); L 5–15, 6–15	M Dominguez (CHI); E Romero (CHI); L 5–15, 2–15	A Guichon (URU); L Rivas (URU); L 7–15, 8–15	4	—N/a	Did not advance	
Juan Bezada; David Yupanqui	Doubles frontenis	O Espinoza (USA); S Espinoza (USA); L 5–15, 7–15	J López (MEX); L Molina (MEX); L 6–15, 6–15	J Alberdi (ARG); G Osorio (ARG); L 8–15, 13–15	J García Toro (CHI); J González (CHI); L 8–15, 15–12, 8–10	4	—N/a	Did not advance	
Daniel Fernández; Edson Velásquez	Doubles fronton leather ball	A Chappi (CUB); F Fernández (CUB); L 2–15, 5–15	P Fusto (ARG); A Villegas (ARG); L 6–15, 4–15	A Brugues (USA); J Huarte (USA); L 4–15, 6–15	R Ledesma (MEX); M Urrutia (MEX); L 6–15, 3–15	4	—N/a	Did not advance	
Rodrigo Carrasco Pro	Individual fronton rubber ball	M Letelier (CHI); W 15–5, 15–10	F Andreasen (ARG); L 7–15, 9–15	E Segura (ESA); W 15–0, 15–4	A González (CUB); L 13–15, 10–15	3	Did not advance		
Jesús Quinto	Individual hand fronton	Bazo (BOL); L 0-2	Nelson (CUB); L 0-2	—N/a		3	Did not advance		
Cristopher Martínez	Peruvian fronton	A González (CUB); W 15–4, 15–4	I Pérez (MEX); W 15–4, 15–3	S Espinoza (USA); W 15–7, 15–10	G Osorio (ARG); W 15–13, 15–9	1º Q	—N/a	G Osorio (ARG); W 15–6, 15–11	1st place, gold medalist(s)

Women

Athlete	Event	Preliminary round					Semifinal	Final / BM	Rank
Athlete	Event	Match 1	Match 2	Match 3	Match 4	Rank	Semifinal	Final / BM	Rank
Athlete	Event	Opposition Score	Opposition Score	Opposition Score	Opposition Score	Rank	Opposition Score	Opposition Score	Rank
Emily Paredes; Karla Rodríguez	Doubles trinquete rubber ball	P Castillo (MEX); R Buendia (MEX); L 5–15, 0–15	M Miranda (URU); C Naviliat (URU); L 5–15, 1–15	—N/a		3	Did not advance		
Jessenia Bernal Arévalo; Mia Rodríguez	Doubles fronton rubber ball	D Figueroa (MEX); L Puentes (MEX); L 3–15, 3–15	S Blason (ARG); M Spahn (ARG); L 6–15, 5–15	D Darriba (CUB); Y Medina (CUB); L 2–15, 5–15	M Bastarrica (CHI); J Dominguez (CHI); W 15–1, 15–2	4 Q	—N/a	S Blason (ARG); M Spahn (ARG); L 0–15, 2–15	4
Nathaly Paredes; Mia Rodríguez	Doubles frontenis	Y Medina (CUB); L Castillo (CUB); L 3–15, 11–15	M Muñoz (CHI); N Bozzo (CHI); W 15–12, 10–15, 10–8	—N/a		2 Q	G Hernandez (MEX); A Mora (MEX); L 1–15, 1–15	Bronze medal game L Busson (ARG); I Podversich (ARG); W 15–11, 15–12	3rd place, bronze medalist(s)
Claudia Suárez	Peruvian fronton	W Durán (CUB); W 15–6, 15–10	M Spahn (ARG); W 15–9, 15–8	D Rangel (VEN); W 15–9, 15–6	R Valderrama (CHI); W 15–5, 15–3	1 Q	—N/a	W Durán (CUB); W 15–4, 15–4	1st place, gold medalist(s)

== Bodybuilding ==
Peru as the host nation qualified a full team of two bodybuilders (one male and one female), automatically.

Athlete	Event	Prejudging		Final	
Athlete	Event	Points	Rank	Points	Rank
Francisco Melgarejo	Men's classic bodybuilding	—N/a		Did not advance	
Jeymmy Cardenas	Women's bikini fitness	—N/a		Did not advance	

- No results were provided for the prejudging round, with only the top six advancing.

== Bowling ==
Athlete	Event	Qualification / Final														Round robin											Semifinal	Final	
Athlete	Event	Block 1						Block 2						Total	Rank	Round robin											Semifinal	Final	
Athlete	Event	1	2	3	4	5	6	7	8	9	10	11	12	Total	Rank	1	2	3	4	5	6	7	8	Total	Grand total	Rank	Opposition Result	Opposition Result	Rank
Yum Ishikawa	Men's singles	216	176	262	278	182	254	199	194	167	247	244	193	2612	14	Did not advance													
Adrián Guibu	Men's singles	224	183	219	171	206	232	211	223	182	178	233	222	2484	22	Did not advance													
Adrián Guibui; Yum Ishikawa	Men's doubles	474	461	392	377	457	429	428	457	440	383	444	525	5267	7	—N/a													
Yumi Yuzuriha	Women's singles	171	255	257	215	172	190	202	197	180	212	168	191	2410	13	Did not advance													
Gabriela Ishikawa	Women's singles	175	195	156	238	193	180	182	157	234	174	128	213	2225	24	Did not advance													
Yumi Yuzuriha; Gabriela Ishikawa	Women's doubles	334	415	368	360	392	367	310	394	364	349	373	360	4386	12	—N/a													

== Boxing ==
Peru qualified 11 boxers (eight men and three women). Seven of these were awarded automatically as host quotas, the rest were earned at the qualification tournament.

Men

Athlete	Event	Preliminaries	Quarterfinals	Semifinals	Final	Rank
Athlete	Event	Opposition Result	Opposition Result	Opposition Result	Opposition Result	Rank
William Peña	49 kg	—N/a	Arce (CUB); L 0–5	Did not advance		
Rogger Rivera	52 kg	—N/a	Rivera (PUR); L 0–5	Did not advance		
Jorvi Farroñan	56 kg	—N/a	Ragan (USA); L 0–5	Did not advance		
Leodan Pezo	60 kg	—N/a	Martínez (PAN); W 4–1	Álvarez (CUB); L RSC	Did not advance	3rd place, bronze medalist(s)
Miguel German	64 kg	Bye	Ryan (ANT); L 1–4	Did not advance		
Luis Miranda	69 kg	—N/a	Maestre (VEN); L 0–5	Did not advance		
José María Lúcar	91 kg	—N/a	Cantabrana (MEX); W 5–0	Castillo (ECU); L 0–5	Did not advance	3rd place, bronze medalist(s)
Luis Muñoz Munayco	+91 kg	—N/a	Torrez (USA); L 0–5	Did not advance		

Women

Athlete	Event	Quarterfinals	Semifinals	Final	Rank
Athlete	Event	Opposition Result	Opposition Result	Opposition Result	Rank
Lucy Valdivia	51 kg	Valencia (COL); L 2–3	Did not advance		
Fiorela Goicochea	57 kg	Sánchez (ARG); L 0–5	Did not advance		
Esperanza Míñope	60 kg	Ferreira (BRA); L 0–5	Did not advance		

== Canoeing ==
=== Slalom ===
Peru qualified a total of four slalom athletes (two men and two women). Both kayak quotas were awarded automatically to Peru as host nation, while the canoe quotas were earned in qualification.

Athlete	Event	Preliminary round			Semifinal		Final	
Athlete	Event	Run 1	Run 2	Rank	Time	Rank	Time	Rank
John Rodríguez	Men's C-1	243.03	129.50	7	—N/a		Did not advance	
Eriberto Robles	Men's K-1	93.77	145.87	8	—N/a		Did not advance	
Eriberto Robles	Men's extreme K-1	—N/a		2 Q	—N/a	3	Did not advance	
Leslie Cuzcano	Women's C-1	441.33	590.32	7	—N/a		Did not advance	
Lenni Ramirez	Women's K-1	133.41	130.90	8	—N/a		Did not advance	
Lenni Ramirez	Women's extreme K-1	—N/a		3	Did not advance			

=== Sprint ===
Men

Athlete	Event	Heat		Semifinal		Final	
Athlete	Event	Time	Rank	Time	Rank	Time	Rank
Beldin Gaona	C-1 1000 m	4.49.417	5 SF	4:49.104	7	Did not advance	

Women

Athlete	Event	Heat		Semifinal		Final	
Athlete	Event	Time	Rank	Time	Rank	Time	Rank
Grecia Gomringer	K-1 200 m	57.671	5 SF	59.491	7	Did not advance	
Ariana Cruz	K-1 500 m	2.31.225	6 SF	2:29.348	7	Did not advance	
Katherine Ccuno; Diana Gomringer	K-2 500 m	2:24.299	5 SF	2:23.503	5	Did not advance	
Grecia Gomringer; Diana Gomringer; Katherine Ccuno; Ariana Cruz	K-4 500 m	—N/a				2:17.958	8

Qualification legend: QF – Qualify to final; SF – Qualify to semifinal

== Cycling ==
=== Road ===
Athlete	Event	Final	
Athlete	Event	Time	Rank
Alonso Zuñiga	Men's road race	4:06:29	6
Alain Colque	Men's road race	4:07:21	10
Royner Calle	Men's road race	4:09:03	20
André Zenteno	Men's road race	4:09:19	26
Angie Bustamante	Women's road race	2:20:34	26
Luddy Quispe	Women's road race	2:21:21	32
Cinthya Rodríguez	Women's road race	2:26:25	34
Hugo Callé	Men's time trial	49:25.81	14
Royner Calle	Men's time trial	50:19.22	17
Romina Ilizarbe	Women's time trial	28:58.71	18

=== Track ===
Sprint

Athlete	Event	Qualification		Round of 16	Repechage 1	Quarterfinals	Semifinals	Final	
Athlete	Event	Time	Rank	Opposition Time	Opposition Time	Opposition Result	Opposition Result	Opposition Result	Rank
Francis Linares	Men's individual	11.697	16	Did not advance					
Robinson Callé	Men's individual	12.052	17	Did not advance					
Ghillma Flores	Women's individual	13.021	14	Did not advance					
Estephany Vilchez	Women's individual	13.597	15	Did not advance					
Francis Linares; Robinson Callé; Ruben Salinas	Men's team	49.939	5	—N/a				Did not advance	(bronze) ^{[a]}^{[b]}
Ghillma Flores; Estephany Vilchez	Women's team	38.830	6	—N/a				Did not advance	

- ^{a} Kacio Fonseca, of Brazil, was disqualified for doping violation.
- ^{b} Njisane Phillip, of Trinidad and Tobago, was disqualified for doping violation.

Team pursuit

Athlete	Event	Qualifying		Elimination	Final / BM	
Athlete	Event	Time	Rank	Opposition Result	Opposition Result	Rank
Alonso Zuñiga; André Zenteno; Alain Colque; Hugo Callé	Men's	4:14.415	5	—N/a	Did not advance	
Angie Bustamante; Luddy Quispe; Romina Ilizarbe; Cinthya Rodríguez	Women's	5:09.577	8 Q	Chile; L 5:11.653	Did not advance	8

Keirin

Athlete	Event	Heats	Repechage	Final
Athlete	Event	Rank	Rank	Rank
Robinson Callé	Men's	3 R	6 FB	9
Estephany Vilchez	Women's	6 R	6 FB	9

Omnium

Athlete	Event	Scratch race		Tempo race		Elimination race		Points race		Total	
Athlete	Event	Rank	Points	Points	Rank	Rank	Points	Points	Rank	Points	Rank
Alonso Zuñiga	Men's	7	28	28	7	5	32	33	4	121	5
Angie Bustamante	Women's	12	18	26	8	12	18	0	11	62	11

Madison

Athlete	Event	Points	Rank
Renato Landa; Cesar Guarniz	Men's	Did not finish	

=== BMX ===
Freestyle

Athlete	Event	Qualification		Final	
Athlete	Event	Points	Rank	Points	Rank
Job Montañez	Men's	63.08	8	63.00	8

Racing

Athlete	Event	Ranking round		Quarterfinal		Semifinal		Final	
Athlete	Event	Time	Rank	Points	Rank	Points	Rank	Time	Rank
André Lacroix	Men's	37.089	20º	17	6	Did not advance			
Luciana Lecaros	Women's	46.572	14	—N/a		18	6	Did not advance	

=== Mountain biking ===
Athlete	Event	Time	Rank
Alexander Urbina Quispe	Men's cross-country	Did not finish	
Rolando Serrano	Men's cross-country	Did not finish	
Lucero Lino	Women's cross-country	Did not finish	

== Diving ==
Men

Athlete	Event	Preliminary		Final	
Athlete	Event	Points	Rank	Points	Rank
Daniel Pinto	Men's 1m Springboard	251.35	16	Did not advance	
Daniel Pinto	Men's 3m Springboard	321.60	18	Did not advance	
Adrian Infante; Daniel Pinto	Men's 3m Synchro	—N/a		331.29	9

Women

Athlete	Event	Preliminary		Final	
Athlete	Event	Points	Rank	Points	Rank
Mayte Salinas	Women's 1m Springboard	196.60	14	Did not advance	
Mayte Salinas	Women's 3m Springboard	196.20	15	Did not advance	
Luciana Gil; Pamela Reyes	Women's 3m Synchro	—N/a		196.23	7

== Equestrian ==
Peru qualified a team of 10 equestrians (three in dressage, four in eventing and three in jumping).

=== Dressage ===
Athlete	Horse	Event	Qualification						Grand Prix Freestyle / Intermediate I Freestyle	
Athlete	Horse	Event	Grand Prix / Prix St. Georges		Grand Prix Special / Intermediate I		Total		Grand Prix Freestyle / Intermediate I Freestyle	
Athlete	Horse	Event	Score	Rank	Score	Rank	Score	Rank	Score	Rank
Eric Chaman	Catalina	Individual	60.765	33	57.353	35	118.118	35	Did not advance	
Kerstin Rojas	Feuertanzer	Individual	65.647	21	60.941	31	126.588	31	Did not advance	
Monika von Wedemeyer	Briar's Boy	Individual	62.265	32	60.941	31	123.206	32	Did not advance	
Eric Chaman; Kerstin Rojas; Monika von Wedemeyer	As above	Team	188.677	6	179.235	6	367.912	6	—N/a	

=== Eventing ===
Athlete	Horse	Event	Dressage		Cross-country		Jumping		Total	
Athlete	Horse	Event	Points	Rank	Points	Rank	Points	Rank	Points	Rank
Hans Alva	Conterina Z	Individual	45.30	39	Eliminated		Did not advance			
Marcelino Cardenas	Vento	Individual	45.50	41	60.00	20	Eliminated		Did not advance	
Diego Farje	Qouter	Individual	43.30	33	15.20	8	0.00	1	58.50	11
Juan Francia	Alpacino Z	Individual	43.30	33	60.80	21	8.00	17	112.10	21
Hans Alva; Marcelino Cardenas; Diego Farje; Juan Francia	As above	Team	131.90	10	136.00	6	1008.00	9	1170.60	7

=== Jumping ===
Athlete	Horse	Event	Qualification								Final					
Athlete	Horse	Event	Round 1		Round 2		Round 3		Total		Round A		Round B		Total	
Athlete	Horse	Event	Faults	Rank	Faults	Rank	Faults	Rank	Faults	Rank	Faults	Rank	Faults	Rank	Faults	Rank
Noe Benlamine	Dimodo	Individual	20.51	45	31	43	31	44	82.51	43 Q	31	31	Did not advance		31	31
Julian Duprat	Crocky van Overis	Individual	21.24	46	Retired		Did not advance									
Alonso Valdéz	Chichester	Individual	43.24	48	16	33	8	16	67.24	42 Q	4	5	13	18	17	18
Noe Benlamine; Julian Duprat; Alonso Valdéz	As above	Team	84.99	12	Eliminated		Did not advance				—N/a					

== Fencing ==
Peru, as the host nation, was allocated a full team of 18 fencers (nine men and nine women).

Men

Athlete	Event	Pool Round		Round of 16	Quarterfinals	Semifinals	Final / BM	
Athlete	Event	Victories	Seed	Opposition Score	Opposition Score	Opposition Score	Opposition Score	Rank
Eduardo García Biel	Individual épée	3	6 q	Ruggeri (ARG); L 11–15	Did not advance			
Alex Landavere	Individual épée	0	17	Did not advance				
Eduardo García Biel; Renan Santaria; Alex Landavere	Team épée	—N/a			Venezuela; L 23–45	Brazil; L 27–45	Canada; L 35–45	8
Federico Cánchez	Individual foil	0	16º	Did not advance				
Marcio Orihuela	Individual foil	0	17	Did not advance				
Federico Cánchez; Joaquin Santaría; Marcio Orihuela	Team foil	—N/a			Canada; L 38–45	Mexico; L 32–45	Puerto Rico; L 26–45	8
Fabian Huapaya	Individual sabre	0	17	Did not advance				
Jet Vargas	Individual sabre	0	18	Did not advance				
Fabian Huapaya; Ángel Jave; Jet Vargas	Team sabre	—N/a			Canada; L 18–45	Brazil; L 27–45	Cuba; L 21–45	8

Women

Athlete	Event	Pool Round		Round of 16	Quarterfinals	Semifinals	Final / BM	
Athlete	Event	Victories	Seed	Opposition Score	Opposition Score	Opposition Score	Opposition Score	Rank
María Luisa Doig	Individual épée	4	4 q	Bello (ARG); W 15–7	Piovesan (VEN); L 11–14	Did not advance		
Cynthia Roldán	Individual épée	1	16	Did not advance				
María Luisa Doig; Karol Montes; Cynthia Roldán	Team épée	—N/a			United States; L 30–45	Argentina; L 36–45	Canada; L 28–45	8
Paola Gil	Individual foil	3	5 q	Bulcão (BRA); L 13–15	Did not advance			
Kusi Rosales	Individual foil	1	16	Did not advance				
Paola Gil; Michela Somocurcio; Kusi Rosales	Team foil	—N/a			Canada; L 16–45	Brazil; L 16–45	Argentina; L 30–45	8
Raisza Lucho	Individual sabre	0	17	Did not advance				
Hillary Aguilar	Individual sabre	0	18	Did not advance				
Raisza Lucho; Kate Ann Cordero; Hillary Aguilar	Team sabre	—N/a			United States; L 15–45	Colombia; L 17–45	Argentina; L 13–45	8

== Field hockey ==
Peru qualified a men's and women's team (of 16 athletes each, for a total of 32) by virtue of being the host nation.

=== Men's tournament ===
Preliminary round

Pos	Team	Pld	W	D	L	GF	GA	GD	Pts	Qualification
1	Canada	3	3	0	0	23	2	+21	9	Quarter-finals
2	United States	3	2	0	1	21	5	+16	6	Quarter-finals
3	Mexico	3	1	0	2	10	12	−2	3	Quarter-finals
4	Peru (H)	3	0	0	3	3	38	−35	0	Quarter-finals

Source: FIH
(H) Hosts

30 July 2019
16:00

United States	16–0	Peru
K. Kaeppler 2', 51'; Harris 2'; Huisman 3', 10', 11', 47', 55'; Cicchi 6', 26'; Montilla 7', 39'; Singh 31', 45'; Orozco 47'; Barratt 49'	Report

Umpires:
Deepak Joshi (IND)
Reinier Diaz (CUB)

1 August 2019
10:00

Mexico	8–2	Peru
Sosa 3', 54'; Aguilar 30+', 33'; Villegas 41', 57'; Sandoval 54'; Estrada 60'	Report	Vilakivi 49'; Dias Espinosa 55'

Umpires:
Reinier Diaz (CUB)
Hugo Romero (PAR)

3 August 2019
16:00

Canada	14–1	Peru
I. Smythe 3'; Johnston 4'; Wallace 4', 36'; Tupper 14', 57'; Panesar 22'; Pereira 26', 55'; Scholfield 27', 41', 44'; Pearson 33', 42'	Report	Diaz Espinosa 8'

Umpires:
Deepak Joshi (IND)
Federico Silva (ARG)

Quarter-finals

5 August 2019
13:30

Argentina	14–1	Peru
Tolini 2', 35', 57'; Rey 6'; Ferreiro 13', 60'; Martínez 19'; Paredes 20', 49'; Casella 21', 25', 39', 43', 47'	Report	Diaz Espinosa 30'

Umpires:
Jonathan Altamirano (MEX)
Benjamin Peters (USA)

Cross over

8 August 2019
09:30

Peru	0–7	Cuba
	Report	Lopez 27'; Aguilera 38'; Somonte 44'; Consuegra 48', 54'; Tratzant 50'; Calderon 53'

Umpires:
Peter Wright (RSA)
Jonathan Altamiano (MEX)

7th place match

10 August 2019
09:30

Peru	0–6	Mexico
	Report	Mendez 21', 22', 51'; Castillo 30'; Aguilar 49'; Hernández 58'

Umpires:
Benjamin Peters (USA)
Reinier Diaz (CUB)

=== Women's tournament ===
The following 16 players were named in the Peru squad.

Head Coach: Patricio Martínez

1. Chiara Conetta (GK)
2. Camila Levaggi
3. Solange Alonso
4. Geraldine Quino
5. Claudia Ardiles
6. María José Fermi (C)
7. Marina Montes
8. Nicole Cueva
9. Yurandi Quino
10. Marianella Álvarez
11. Camila Méndez
12. Ana Palomino (GK)
13. María Jiménez
14. Malen Moccagatta
15. Victoria Montes
16. Daniela Ramírez

Preliminary round

Pos	Team	Pld	W	D	L	GF	GA	GD	Pts	Qualification
1	United States	3	3	0	0	17	2	+15	9	Quarter-finals
2	Chile	3	2	0	1	17	4	+13	6	Quarter-finals
3	Mexico	3	1	0	2	4	7	−3	3	Quarter-finals
4	Peru (H)	3	0	0	3	0	25	−25	0	Quarter-finals

Source: FIH
(H) Hosts

29 July 2019
16:00

Chile	13–0	Peru
Maldonado 4', 54', 59'; Walbaum 5'; Villagran 10', 19', 35'; Urroz 28', 47', 59'; García 41'; De las Heras 43'; Jacob 53'	Report

Umpires:
Ayanna McClean (TTO)
Mary Driscoll (USA)

31 July 2019
10:00

Mexico	4–0	Peru
Estrada 28', 39'; Oveido 52'; González 59'	Report

Umpires:
Megan Robertson (CAN)
Natalia Lodeiro (URU)

2 August 2019
12:00

United States	8–0	Peru
Moyer 7'; Grega 29'; Matson 30'; Allessie 32', 34', 40', 49'; Sharkey 60'	Report

Umpires:
Natalia Lodeiro (URU)
Catalina Montesino (CHI)

Quarter-finals

4 August 2019
09:30

Argentina	21–0	Peru
M. Granatto 3', 18', 26'; Jankunas 10', 32', 45', 55'; Costa 14'; Luchetti 18', 60'; Albertarrio 23', 30', 43'; Alonso 25', 35'; V. Granatto 29', 49', 56'; Retegui 33'; D'Elía 45'; Trinchinetti 47'	Report

Umpires:
Mary Driscoll (USA)
Maria Fuentes Castelo (Mex)

Cross over

6 August 2019
09:30

Peru	0–14	Uruguay
	Report	Viana 3', 30', 32', 42', 45'; Oliveros 11', 56'; Stanley 17'; Taborda 23', 31', 50'; Vilar del Valle 26', 32'; Olave 35'

Umpires:
Mary Driscoll (USA)
Megan Robertson (CAN)

7th place match

9 August 2019
9:30

Peru	3–2	Cuba
Montes 10', 36'; Alvarez 14'	Report	Vera 14'; Fernandez 44'

Umpires:
Natalia Lodeiro (URU)
Victoria Pazos (PAR)

== Football ==
Peru automatically (as host nation) qualified a men's and women's team (of 18 athletes each, for a total of 36).

Summary

Team	Event	Group stage				Semifinal	Final / BM / Pl.	
Team	Event	Opposition Result	Opposition Result	Opposition Result	Rank	Opposition Result	Opposition Result	Rank
Peru men	Men's tournament	Uruguay; L 0–2	Honduras; D 2–2	Jamaica; L 0–2	4	—N/a	Ecuador; W 1–1 (4–2)	7
Peru women	Women's tournament	Argentina; L 0–3	Costa Rica; L 1–3	Panama; D 1–1	4	—N/a	Jamaica; L 0–1	8

=== Men's tournament ===
Group B

Pos	Team	Pld	W	D	L	GF	GA	GD	Pts	Qualification
1	Uruguay	3	3	0	0	7	0	+7	9	Knockout stage
2	Honduras	3	1	1	1	5	6	−1	4	Knockout stage
3	Jamaica	3	1	0	2	3	5	−2	3	Fifth place match
4	Peru (H)	3	0	1	2	2	6	−4	1	Seventh place match

Source: Lima 2019
Rules for classification: Tie-breakers
(H) Hosts
29 July 2019
20:30

Uruguay	2–0	Peru
Núñez 6'; Fernández 36'	Report

Estadio Universidad San Marcos
Referee: Ulises Mereles (Paraguay)
1 August 2019
20:30

Honduras	2–2	Peru
Vuelto 90+2'; Maldonado 90+7'	Report	Quevedo 15'; Guivin 62'

Estadio Universidad San Marcos
Referee: Felipe González (Chile)
4 August 2019
20:30

Jamaica	2–0	Peru
Beckford 55', 60'	Report

Estadio Universidad San Marcos
Referee: Fernando Echenique (Argentina)

Seventh place match

7 August 2019
10:00

Ecuador	1–1	Peru
Vivar 88'	Report	Minda 83' (o.g.)
Penalties
Vallecilla (penalty scored); Alcivar (penalty missed); Porozo (penalty scored); Minda (penalty missed)	2–4	(penalty missed) Barco; (penalty scored) Acuy; (penalty scored) Arakaki; (penalty scored) Pretell; (penalty scored) Rivera

Estadio Universidad San Marcos
Referee: José Argote (Venezuela)

=== Women's tournament ===
Group B

Pos	Team	Pld	W	D	L	GF	GA	GD	Pts	Qualification
1	Costa Rica	3	2	1	0	6	2	+4	7	Knockout stage
2	Argentina	3	2	1	0	4	0	+4	7	Knockout stage
3	Panama	3	0	1	2	2	5	−3	1	Fifth place match
4	Peru (H)	3	0	1	2	2	7	−5	1	Seventh place match

Source: Lima 2019
Rules for classification: Tie-breakers
(H) Hosts
28 July 2019
20:30

Argentina	3–0	Peru
Larroquette 6', 88'; Oviedo 9'	Report

Estadio Universidad San Marcos
Referee: Dione Rissios (Chile)
31 July 2019
20:30

Costa Rica	3–1	Peru
R. Rodríguez 55', 90+3'; C. Sánchez 84'	Report	Otiniano 14'

Estadio Universidad San Marcos
Referee: Adriana Farfán (Bolivia)
3 August 2019
20:30

Panama	1–1	Peru
Cox 39' (pen.)	Report	Otiniano 41'

Estadio Universidad San Marcos
Referee: Yercinia Correa (Venezuela)

Seventh place match

6 August 2019
10:00

Jamaica	1–0	Peru
Grey 26'	Report

Estadio Universidad San Marcos
Referee: Adriana Farfán (Bolivia)

== Golf ==
Peru as host nation automatically qualified a full team of four golfers (two men and two women).

Athlete(s)	Event	Final						
Athlete(s)	Event	Round 1	Round 2	Round 3	Round 4	Total	To par	Rank
Luis Fernando Barco	Men's individual	67	68	68	69	272	-12	5
Julián Périco	Men's individual	70	73	66	67	276	-18	=8
Micaela Faraha	Women's individual	73	73	76	74	296	+12	=17
María Siegenthaler	Women's individual	75	77	78	77	307	+23	28
Luis Fernando Barco; Julián Périco; Micaela Faraha; María Siegenthaler	Mixed team	140	141	142	141	564	-4	10

== Gymnastics ==
=== Trampoline ===
Peru qualified a one male trampolinist.

== Handball ==
Summary

Team	Event	Group stage				Semifinal	Final / BM	
Team	Event	Opposition Result	Opposition Result	Opposition Result	Rank	Opposition Result	Opposition Result	Rank
Peru men	Men's tournament	Puerto Rico; L 23–27	Brazil; L 16–40	Mexico; L 17–34	4	5th-8th place classification United States; L 16–22	Seventh place match Puerto Rico; L 19–27	8
Peru women	Women's tournament	Dominican Republic; L 16–46	Argentina; L 7–52	United States; L 11–29	4	5th-8th place classification Puerto Rico; L 14–43	Seventh place match Canada; L 12–31	8

=== Men's tournament ===
Pos	Team	Pld	W	D	L	GF	GA	GD	Pts	Qualification
1	Brazil	3	3	0	0	108	65	+43	6	Semifinals
2	Mexico	3	2	0	1	81	69	+12	4	Semifinals
3	Puerto Rico	3	1	0	2	72	82	−10	2	5–8th place semifinals
4	Peru (H)	3	0	0	3	56	101	−45	0	5–8th place semifinals

Source: Lima 2019
Rules for classification: 1) points; 2) head-to-head points; 3) head-to-head goal difference; 4) head-to-head goals scored; 5) goal difference; 6) goals scored; 7) draw.
(H) Hosts

31 July 2019; 15:30	Puerto Rico	27–23	Peru	Villa Deportiva Nacional; Referees: Paolantoni, García (ARG)
31 July 2019; 15:30	Nazario 7	(14–10)	Velez 7	Villa Deportiva Nacional; Referees: Paolantoni, García (ARG)
31 July 2019; 15:30	2× (yellow card) 1× (suspension) 1× (red card)	Report	1× (yellow card) 5× (suspension)	Villa Deportiva Nacional; Referees: Paolantoni, García (ARG)

1 August 2019; 18:00	Peru	16–40	Brazil	Villa Deportiva Nacional; Referees: Pineda, Estrada (COL)
1 August 2019; 18:00	Velez 4	(7–27)	Chiuffa 10	Villa Deportiva Nacional; Referees: Pineda, Estrada (COL)
1 August 2019; 18:00	2× (suspension)	Report	2× (yellow card) 5× (suspension)	Villa Deportiva Nacional; Referees: Pineda, Estrada (COL)

2 August 2019; 17:30	Mexico	34–17	Peru	Villa Deportiva Nacional; Referees: Pineda, Estrada (COL)
2 August 2019; 17:30	Ávalos 9	(16–9)	Trelles, Zerillo 4	Villa Deportiva Nacional; Referees: Pineda, Estrada (COL)
2 August 2019; 17:30	5× (suspension)	Report	2× (yellow card) 3× (suspension)	Villa Deportiva Nacional; Referees: Pineda, Estrada (COL)

5th-8th place classification

4 August 2019; 12:00	United States	22–16	Peru	Villa Deportiva Nacional; Referees: Pinto, Menezes (BRA)
4 August 2019; 12:00	Hoddersen 8	(13–7)	Alvarado, Zerillo 3	Villa Deportiva Nacional; Referees: Pinto, Menezes (BRA)
4 August 2019; 12:00	3× (yellow card) 2× (suspension)	Report	6× (suspension) 1× (red card)	Villa Deportiva Nacional; Referees: Pinto, Menezes (BRA)

Seventh place match

5 August 2019; 10:00	Puerto Rico	27–19	Peru	Villa Deportiva Nacional; Referees: Pineda, Estrada (COL)
5 August 2019; 10:00	Nazario 8	(12–9)	Zerillo 6	Villa Deportiva Nacional; Referees: Pineda, Estrada (COL)
5 August 2019; 10:00	1× (yellow card) 4× (suspension)	Report	2× (yellow card) 4× (suspension)	Villa Deportiva Nacional; Referees: Pineda, Estrada (COL)

=== Women's tournament ===
Pos	Team	Pld	W	D	L	GF	GA	GD	Pts	Qualification
1	Argentina	3	3	0	0	105	39	+66	6	Semifinals
2	United States	3	2	0	1	70	59	+11	4	Semifinals
3	Dominican Republic	3	1	0	2	85	69	+16	2	5–8th place semifinals
4	Peru (H)	3	0	0	3	34	127	−93	0	5–8th place semifinals

Source: Lima 2019
Rules for classification: 1) points; 2) head-to-head points; 3) head-to-head goal difference; 4) head-to-head goals scored; 5) goal difference; 6) goals scored; 7) draw.
(H) Hosts

24 July 2019; 15:30	Dominican Republic	46−16	Peru	Villa Deportiva Nacional; Referees: Pineda, Estrada (COL)
24 July 2019; 15:30	Andino 13	(22−7)	Cruz 8	Villa Deportiva Nacional; Referees: Pineda, Estrada (COL)
24 July 2019; 15:30	1× (yellow card) 5× (suspension)	Report	1× (yellow card) 7× (suspension) 1× (red card)	Villa Deportiva Nacional; Referees: Pineda, Estrada (COL)

25 July 2019; 18:00	Peru	7−52	Argentina	Villa Deportiva Nacional; Referees: Sosa, Lemes (URU)
25 July 2019; 18:00	Cruz 4	(2−25)	Karsten 10	Villa Deportiva Nacional; Referees: Sosa, Lemes (URU)
25 July 2019; 18:00	1× (yellow card) 6× (suspension)	Report	1× (yellow card) 1× (suspension)	Villa Deportiva Nacional; Referees: Sosa, Lemes (URU)

27 July 2019; 15:30	United States	29–11	Peru	Villa Deportiva Nacional; Referees: Zuñiga, Reyes (CUB)
27 July 2019; 15:30	Butler, Taylor 5	(16–8)	Cruz, Servat 4	Villa Deportiva Nacional; Referees: Zuñiga, Reyes (CUB)
27 July 2019; 15:30	3× (yellow card) 3× (suspension)	Report	1× (suspension)	Villa Deportiva Nacional; Referees: Zuñiga, Reyes (CUB)

Semifinal

29 July 2019; 12:00	Puerto Rico	43–14	Peru	Villa Deportiva Nacional; Referees: Lenci, López (ARG)
29 July 2019; 12:00	Fuentes 8	(24–7)	Cruz 4	Villa Deportiva Nacional; Referees: Lenci, López (ARG)
29 July 2019; 12:00		Report	3× (suspension)	Villa Deportiva Nacional; Referees: Lenci, López (ARG)

Seventh place match

30 July 2019; 10:00	Canada	31–12	Peru	Villa Deportiva Nacional; Referees: Pineda, Estrada (COL)
30 July 2019; 10:00	Routhier 8	(17–6)	Delgado 5	Villa Deportiva Nacional; Referees: Pineda, Estrada (COL)
30 July 2019; 10:00	1× (yellow card) 2× (suspension)	Report	1× (yellow card) 2× (suspension)	Villa Deportiva Nacional; Referees: Pineda, Estrada (COL)

== Judo ==
Men

Athlete	Event	Round of 16	Quarterfinals	Semifinals	Repechage	Final / BM	
Athlete	Event	Opposition Result	Opposition Result	Opposition Result	Opposition Result	Opposition Result	Rank
Dilmer Calle	−60 kg	Bye	E Ramírez (DOM); W 10S2–00S3	L Preciado (ECU); L 00–10	—N/a	A Diaz (USA); L 00S1–01S1	5
Juan Postigos	−66 kg	Bye	W Mateo (DOM); L 00S1–10	Did not advance	J González (COL); W 01S1–00S1	R Valderrama (VEN); L 00S2–10S1	5
Alonso Wong	−73 kg	Bye	B Langlois (CAN); W 10–00S3	E Araújo (MEX); W 10S1–00S3	—N/a	M Estrada (CUB); L 00S2–10S1	2nd place, silver medalist(s)
Luis Angeles Sotelo	−81 kg	S Ayala (MEX); L 00S1–10S2	Did not advance				9
Yuta Galarreta	−90 kg	V Ochoa (MEX); W 01S1–00S2	R Florentino (DOM); L 00S3–10	Did not advance	T Spikermann (ARG); W 10–00S1	R Macedo (BRA); W 11–00S1	3rd place, bronze medalist(s)
José Arroyo Osório	−100 kg	Bye	L Cárdona (CUB); L 00S2–10	Did not advance	C Garzón (COL); W 11S1–00S1	J Angulo (ECU); L 00S2–01S2	5
Frank Alvarado	+100 kg	A Tadehara (USA); L 00S2–10	Did not advance				9

Women

Athlete	Event	Round of 16	Quarterfinals	Semifinals	Repechage	Final / BM	
Athlete	Event	Opposition Result	Opposition Result	Opposition Result	Opposition Result	Opposition Result	Rank
Noemi Huayhuameza	−48 kg	M Dee Vargas (CHI); L 00–01	Did not advance				9
Brillith Gamarra	−52 kg	Bye	M Besson (CAN); W 01S1–00	L Pimenta (BRA); L 00S3–10	—N/a	K Jiménez (PAN); L 00S1–01S2	5
Kiara Arango	−57 kg	C Rahming (BAH); W 10–00S3	A Rosa (DOM); L 00S1–10S1	Did not advance	Y Amaris (COL); L 00–10	Did not advance	7
Ariana Cornejo	−63 kg	M Choconta (COL); L 00S2–01S2	Did not advance				9
Xsara Morales	−70 kg	C Wright (USA); L 00S1–01S3	Did not advance				9
Camila Figueroa	−78 kg	N Papadakis (USA); L 00S2–01	Did not advance				9
Yuliana Bolívar	+78 kg	L Castillo (COL); W 10–00S2	M Mojica (PUR); L 00S1–11	Did not advance	P Martínez (MEX); W 10S1–00S3	N Cutro-Kelly (USA); W 10–00S3	3rd place, bronze medalist(s)

== Karate ==
Kumite (sparring)

Athlete	Event	Round robin				Semifinal	Final	
Athlete	Event	Opposition Result	Opposition Result	Opposition Result	Rank	Opposition Result	Opposition Result	Rank
Amado Escalante	Men's –60 kg	Martínez (VEN); L 2-5	Estrada (MEX); L 0-7	Lavín (CHI); L 0-8	4	Did not advance		
Andhi Ávila	Men's –67 kg	Noriega (CUB); L 0-0	Delgado (VEN); L 0-0	Velozo (CHI); L 0-0	4	Did not advance		
José Valdívia	Men's –75 kg	Landázuri (COL); D 1-1	Scott (USA); L 0-3	Veríssimo (BRA); L 0-7	4	Did not advance		
Carlos Mendoza	Men's –84 kg	Valera (VEN); L 0-3	Espinoza (ECU); L 1-6	Sinisterra (COL); L 0-1	4	Did not advance		
Jorge Beltrán	Men's –84 kg	Lenis (COL); L 0-6	Rojas (CHI); L 0-8	Mina (ECU); L 0-1	4	Did not advance		
Selene Eliset Rodriguez	Women's –50 kg	de Paula (BRA); L 3-5	Nishi (USA); L 1-3	Benítez (ARG); W 7-1	3	Did not advance		
Alessandra Vindrola	Women's –55 kg	Campbell (CAN); W 5-4	Torres (CUB); L 0-3	Navarrete (VEN); L 1-3	3	Did not advance		
Alexandra Grande	Women's –61 kg	Factos (ECU); W 3-0	dos Santos (BRA); L 0-3	Sequera (VEN); W 8-0	1 Q	Caballero (MEX); W 3-0	Sequera (VEN); W 6-1	1st place, gold medalist(s)
Gabriela López	Women's –68 kg	Martínez (CUB); L 1-1	Rodríguez (DOM); L 1-6	Li (CHI); L 0-3	4	Did not advance		
Isabel Aco	Women's +68 kg	—N/a	Ogando (DOM); L 2-3	Quintal (MEX); W 1-0	2 Q	Molina (VEN); L 2-5	Did not advance	3rd place, bronze medalist(s)

Kata (forms)

Athlete	Event	Pool round 1		Pool round 2		Final / BM	
Athlete	Event	Score	Rank	Score	Rank	Opposition Result	Rank
Mariano Wong	Men's individual	23.66	2 Q	24.60	2 Q	Bronze medal contest Ramírez (MEX); W 24.92-24.10	3rd place, bronze medalist(s)
John Trebejo; Oliver del Castillo; Carlos Lam	Men's team	24.20	1 Q	—N/a		Mexico; V 25.48-24.20	1st place, gold medalist(s)
Ingrid Aranda	Women's individual	23.80	3 Q	23.86	2 Q	Bronze medal contest Mota (BRA); W 24.86-24.68	3rd place, bronze medalist(s)
Saida Salcedo; Sol Romani; Rosa Almarza	Women's team	23.86	2 Q	—N/a		Costa Rica; W W.O.	3rd place, bronze medalist(s)

== Modern pentathlon ==
Peru as host nation received four modern pentathlete quotas (two men and two women).

Athlete	Event	Fencing (Épée one touch)			Swimming (200 m freestyle)			Riding (Show jumping)			Shooting / Running (10 m laser pistol / 3000 m cross-country)			Total	
Athlete	Event	V – D	Rank	MP points	Time	Rank	MP points	Penalties	Rank	MP points	Time	Rank	MP points	MP points	Rank
Juan Carlos Montero	Men's individual	4-27	32	126	2:40.30	31	230	14	7	286	12:19.00	24	561	1203	19
Jair Ever Reategui	Men's individual	9-22	26	159	2:27.47	28	256	EL		0	11:53.00	21	587	1002	28
Juan Carlos Montero; Jair Ever Reategui	Men's relay	7-19	12	162	2:11.76	10	287	15	1	285	14:28.00	12	432	1166	11
Jane Vanessa Pereira	Women's individual	11-20	23	173	3:00.33	29	190	53	15	247	15:07.00	393	23	1003	18
Tony Espinoza	Women's individual	3-28	31	117	2:50.61	27	209	3	1	297	15:38.00	362	26	985	22
Jane Vanessa Pereira; Tony Espinoza	Women's relay	13-27	10	177	2:31.82	10	247	39	1	261	14:14.00	6	446	1131	5
Juan Carlos Montero; Tony Espinoza	Mixed relay	8-40	13	139	2:24.04	13	262	8	2	292	13:19.00	11	501	1194	11

== Racquetball ==
Peru qualified three male racquetball athletes.

Men

Athlete	Event	Qualifying Round robin				Round of 16	Quarterfinals	Semifinals	Final	Rank
Athlete	Event	Match 1	Match 2	Match 3	Rank	Opposition Result	Opposition Result	Opposition Result	Opposition Result	Rank
Jonatha Luque	Singles	(United States) Jacob Bredenbeck; L 0–2	(Guatemala) Edwin Galícia; L 0–2	(Colombia) Sebastián Franco; L 0–2	4	Did not advance				
Erik Mendoza	Singles	(Cuba) Maykel Moyet; L 0–2	(Mexico) Rodrigo Montoya; L 0–2	(Dominican Republic) Ramón de León; L 0–2	4	Did not advance				
Jonathan Luque; Sebastián Mendiguri	Doubles	(Colombia) Sebastian Franco; Mario Mercado; L 0–2	(Bolivia) Roland Keller; Conrrado Moscoso; L 0–2	(Ecuador) Fernando Ríos; José Ugalde; L 0–2	4	Did not advance				
Jonathan Luque; Sebastián Mendiguri; Erik Mendoza	Team	—N/a				Colombia; L 0–2	Did not advance			9

== Roller sports ==
=== Artistic ===
Athlete	Event	Short program		Long program		Total	
Athlete	Event	Score	Rank	Score	Rank	Score	Rank
Roberto Quiroz	Men's	7.65	8	14.13	8	21.78	8
Brigitte Lopez	Women's	10.98	8	15.33	8	26.31	8

=== Speed ===
Athlete	Event	Preliminary		Semifinal		Final	
Athlete	Event	Time	Rank	Time	Rank	Time	Rank
Ronaldo Guevara	Men's 300 m time trial	—N/a				26.351	8
Ronaldo Guevara	Men's 500 m	46.065	4	Did not advance			
Bernardo Gómez	Men's 10,000 m elimination	—N/a				Eliminated	
Jessica Estevez	Women's 300 m time trial	—N/a				32.378	10
Jessica Estevez	Women's 10,000 m elimination	—N/a				DNS	

== Rowing ==
Men

Athlete	Event	Heat		Repechage		Semifinal		Final	
Athlete	Event	Time	Rank	Time	Rank	Time	Rank	Time	Rank
Gonzalo del Solar	Single sculls	7:28.81	3 SF	Bye		7:17.04	3 FA	7:16.04	5
Álvaro Torres; Gerónimo Hamann	Double sculls	6:34.04	3 R	6:25.00	1 FA	—N/a		6:33.56	5
Renzo León; Gianfranco Colmenares	Lwt double sculls	6:26.80	3 R	6:31.82	2 FA	—N/a		6:36.01	5

Women

Athlete	Event	Heat		Repechage		Semifinal		Final	
Athlete	Event	Time	Rank	Time	Rank	Time	Rank	Time	Rank
Camila Valle; Pamela Noya	Lwt single sculls	7:30.49	3 R	7:17.77	3 FA	—N/a		7:27.67	5
Valeria Palacios; Alessia Palacios; Camila Valle; Pamela Noya	Quadruple sculls	8:02.90	6 F	—N/a				6:49.45	6

== Rugby sevens ==
=== Women's tournament ===
Pool stage

Pos	Team	Pld	W	D	L	PF	PA	PD	Pts	Qualification
1	Canada	3	3	0	0	134	0	+134	9	Semifinals
2	Brazil	3	2	0	1	78	31	+47	7	Semifinals
3	Peru	3	1	0	2	48	94	−46	5	5–8th place semifinals
4	Mexico	3	0	0	3	7	143	−136	3	5–8th place semifinals

Source: Lima 2019
Rules for classification: 1) Points; 2) Head-to-head result; 3) Point difference; 4) Points scored; 5) draw.

26 July 2019
10:40

Brazil	33–5	Peru
Try: Zanellato (2) 5'c, 12'c Cerullo (2) 9'c, 12'c Kochhann 14'm Con: Kochhann (2/3) 6', 9', 13'; Cerullo (1/1) 12'	Report	Try: Flores 2'm Con: Quesada (0/1)

Villa María del Triunfo Sports Center
Referee: Shanda Mosher-Gallant (Canada)

27 July 2019
11:25

Canada	54–0	Peru
Try: Aikens (2) 0'c, 3'c Moleschi 5'c Chown 7'c Hogan-Rochester (3) 7'c, 11'c, 14'c Buisa 10'm Con: Levale (5/5) 0', 4', 5', 7', 8'; Nicholas (2/3) 11', 14'	Report

Villa María del Triunfo Sports Center
Referee: Nerea Livoni (Argentina)

27 July 2019
14:50

Peru	43–7	Mexico
Try: Flores (5) 0'm, 2'c, 3'c, 12'm, 14'm Quesada 7'c Pacheco 9'c Con: Quesada (3/6) 2', 4', 7'; Chuquivala (1/1) 9'	Report	Try: Elguezabal 11'c Con: Salomón (1/1) 11'

Villa María del Triunfo Sports Center
Referee: Shanda Mosher-Gallant (Canada)

5th-8th classification

28 July 2019
9:10

Peru	31–10	Trinidad and Tobago
Try: Ratto 1'c Flores (2) 4'm, 7'm Quesada 9'c Masias 12'c Con: Quesada (3/5) 1', 9', 12'	Report	Try: Kintiba (2) 5'm, 10'm Con: Jack (0/2)

Villa María del Triunfo Sports Center
Referee: Nerea Livoni (Argentina)

Fifth place match

28 July 2019
13:25

Peru	12–34	Argentina
Try: Flores 3'c Quesada 11'm Con: Quesada (1/2) 4'	Report	Try: Montero (3) 2'c, 5'c, 14'm Aguilar 8'm Pedrozo 10'm Mattus 12'm Con: Padellaro (2/4) 2', 5'; Aguilar (0/2)

Villa María del Triunfo Sports Center
Referee: Shanda Mosher-Gallant (Canada)

== Sailing ==
Peru received automatic qualification of 11 boats for a total of 17 sailors.

Men

Athlete	Event	Race													Total	
Athlete	Event	1	2	3	4	5	6	7	8	9	10	11	12	M	Points	Rank
Alessio Botteri	RS:X	~~8~~	7	6	5	5	7	8	8	7	4	6	1	Did not advance	64	6
Stefano Peschiera	Laser	12	4	4	4	6	8	2	1	~~23~~ (UFD)	5	—N/a		12	58	5
Jean de Trazegnies; Mathias Panizo	49er	8	8	8	8	8	8	~~9~~; DNF	9 DNF	9 DNS	9 DNF	7	8	Did not advance	90	8

Women

Athlete	Event	Race													Total	
Athlete	Event	1	2	3	4	5	6	7	8	9	10	11	12	M	Points	Rank
María Belén Bazo	RS:X	2	2	2	4	3	~~7~~	4	2	2	3	1	2	10	37	3rd place, bronze medalist(s)
Paloma Schmidt	Laser radial	2	7	~~14~~	9	7	11	7	8	3	6	—N/a		14	74	7
Diana Tudela; María van Oordt	49erFX	~~5~~	5	5	2	5	5	5	4	5	5	5	4	10	60	5

Mixed

Athlete	Event	Race													Total	
Athlete	Event	1	2	3	4	5	6	7	8	9	10	11	12	M	Points	Rank
Ismael Muelle; Gali Amsel	Snipe	10	~~11~~; DSQ	10	7	8	7	8	8	8	8	—N/a		Did not advance	74	9
Daniel Mendoza; Jimena Gaviño; Sergio Levaggi	Lightning	6	6	6	1	~~7~~	6	6	5	4	6	—N/a		Did not advance	46	6
Javier Arribas; Cristina Salinas	Nacra 17	4	4	5	5	5	~~8~~	5	4	6	4	7	8	10	67	5

Open

Athlete	Event	Race																					Total	
Athlete	Event	1	2	3	4	5	6	7	8	9	10	11	12	13	14	15	16	17	18	M1	M2	M3	Points	Rank
Francesco Puliatti	Kites	8	7	7	8	6	7	6	7	7	5	~~9~~	8	~~9~~	7	7	~~9~~	6	7	Did not advance			103	8
Renzo Sanguineti	Sunfish	3	3	~~8~~	6	4	4	7	1	3	1	—N/a								2	—N/a		34	3rd place, bronze medalist(s)

== Shooting ==
Men

Athlete	Event	Qualification		Final	
Athlete	Event	Points	Rank	Points	Rank
Marko Carrillo	10 m air pistol	569	5 Q	195.7	4
Marko Carrillo	25 m rapid fire pistol	582	2 Q	21	3rd place, bronze medalist(s)
José Ullilen	10 m air pistol	556	25	Did not advance	
Kevin Altamirano	25 m rapid fire pistol	569	6 Q	7	6
Daniel Vizcarra	10 m air rifle	615.8	14	Did not advance	
Daniel Vizcarra	50 m rifle three position	1158	5 Q	404.3	6
Miguel Mejia	10 m air rifle	597.4	27	Did not advance	
Miguel Mejia	50 m rifle three position	1108	23	Did not advance	
Alessandro de Souza	Trap	122	2 Q	35	4
Asier Cilloniz	Trap	115	8	Did not advance	
Nicolás Pacheco	Skeet	120+1+2	6 Q	40	3rd place, bronze medalist(s)
Rodolfo MacPherson	Skeet	109	22	Did not advance	

Women

Athlete	Event	Qualification		Final	
Athlete	Event	Points	Rank	Points	Rank
Miriam Quintanilla	10 m air pistol	544	21	Did not advance	
Annia Becerra	10 m air pistol	543	22	Did not advance	
Liz Carrión	25 m pistol	569	6 Q	12	6
Brianda Rivera	25 m pistol	558	15	Did not advance	
Sara Vizcarra	10 m air rifle	619.5	7 Q	119.0	8
Sara Vizcarra	50 m rifle three position	1133	13	Did not advance	
Lucia Cruz	10 m air rifle	611.4	16	Did not advance	
Karina Rodríguez	50 m rifle three position	1129	18	Did not advance	
Daniela Pacheco	Trap	88	13	Did not advance	
Daniela Borda	Skeet	116	5 Q	13	6

Mixed

Athlete	Event	Qualification		Final	
Athlete	Event	Points	Rank	Points	Rank
Marko Carrillo; Annia Becerra	10 m air pistol	752	9	Did not advance	
José Ullilen; Miriam Quintanilla	10 m air pistol	734	20	Did not advance	
Daniel Vizcarra; Sara Vizcarra	10 m air rifle	821.5	9	Did not advance	
Miguel Mejia; Lucia Cruz	10 m air rifle	811.9	19	Did not advance	
Alessandro de Souza; Daniela Pacheco	Trap	121	11	Did not advance	

== Softball ==
Peru qualified a men's and women's team (of 15 athletes each) by virtue of being the host nation.

=== Men's tournament ===
Preliminary round

Team	Pld	W	L	RF	RA	RD	Qualification
Argentina	5	5	0	29	4	+25	Qualified for the semifinals
United States	5	4	1	38	10	+28	Qualified for the semifinals
Cuba	5	3	2	33	22	+11	Qualified for the semifinals
Mexico	5	2	3	31	23	+8	Qualified for the semifinals
Venezuela	5	1	4	7	17	−10	
Peru	5	0	5	0	62	−62	

25 July 2019; 16:00	Peru	0–15 (F/4)	Cuba	Softball Field, Villa María del Triunfo; Attendance: 475
25 July 2019; 16:00		Boxscore		Softball Field, Villa María del Triunfo; Attendance: 475

27 July 2019; 16:00	Mexico	11–0 (F/4)	Peru	Softball Field, Villa María del Triunfo; Attendance: 0
27 July 2019; 16:00		Boxscore		Softball Field, Villa María del Triunfo; Attendance: 0

28 July 2019; 16:00	Peru	0–3	Venezuela	Softball Field, Villa María del Triunfo; Attendance: 914
28 July 2019; 16:00		Boxscore		Softball Field, Villa María del Triunfo; Attendance: 914

29 July 2019; 16:00	Peru	0–20	United States	Softball Field, Villa María del Triunfo
29 July 2019; 16:00		Boxscore		Softball Field, Villa María del Triunfo

30 July 2019; 18:00	Argentina	13–0	Peru	Softball Field, Villa María del Triunfo
30 July 2019; 18:00		Boxscore		Softball Field, Villa María del Triunfo

=== Women's tournament ===
Preliminary round

Team	Pld	W	L	RF	RA	RD	Qualification
United States	5	5	0	37	1	+36	Qualified for the semifinals
Canada	5	4	1	23	7	+16	Qualified for the semifinals
Puerto Rico	5	3	2	18	12	+6	Qualified for the semifinals
Mexico	5	2	3	20	17	+3	Qualified for the semifinals
Venezuela	5	1	4	9	41	−32	
Peru	5	0	5	5	34	−29	

4 August 2019; 16:00	Venezuela	5–3	Peru	Campo de Softbol, Lima; Attendance: 1 160
4 August 2019; 16:00		Boxscore		Campo de Softbol, Lima; Attendance: 1 160

5 August 2019; 16:00	Peru	0–9	Mexico	Campo de Softbol, Lima; Attendance: 416
5 August 2019; 16:00		Boxscore		Campo de Softbol, Lima; Attendance: 416

6 August 2019; 16:00	Peru	2–6	Puerto Rico	Campo de Softbol, Lima; Attendance: 525
6 August 2019; 16:00		Boxscore		Campo de Softbol, Lima; Attendance: 525

7 August 2019; 16:00	Peru	0–7	Canada	Campo de Softbol, Lima; Attendance: 453
7 August 2019; 16:00		Boxscore		Campo de Softbol, Lima; Attendance: 453

8 August 2019; 16:00	United States	7–0	Peru	Campo de Softbol, Lima; Attendance: 524
8 August 2019; 16:00		Boxscore		Campo de Softbol, Lima; Attendance: 524

== Squash ==
Men

Athlete	Event	Group stage			Round of 16	Quarterfinal	Semifinal / Cl.	Final / BM / Pl.	
Athlete	Event	Opposition Result	Opposition Result	Rank	Opposition Result	Opposition Result	Opposition Result	Opposition Result	Rank
Diego Elías	Singles	—N/a			Franco (GUA); W 3-0	Harrity (USA); W 3-0	Salazar (MEX); W 3-0	Rodríguez (COL); W 3-1	1st place, gold medalist(s)
Diego Elías; Alonso Escudero	Doubles	—N/a				Herrera / Vargas (COL); W2-0	Harrity / Hanson (USA); L 0-2	Did not advance	3rd place, bronze medalist(s)
Diego Elías; Alonso Escudero; Andrés Quesada	Team	Guatemala; W 2-1	Mexico; L 1-2	2	El Salvador; W 2-0	Canada; L 1-2	Classification 5th-8th place Guatemala; L 0-2	Seventh place match Argentina; L 0-3	8

Women

Athlete	Event	Group stage				Round of 16	Quarterfinal	Semifinal	Final / BM	
Athlete	Event	Opposition Result	Opposition Result	Opposition Result	Rank	Opposition Result	Opposition Result	Opposition Result	Opposition Result	Rank
Ximena Rodríguez	Singles	—N/a				García (MEX); L 0-3	Did not advance			
Ximena Rodríguez; Alejandra Arana	Doubles	—N/a					Cornett / Letourneau (CAN); L 0-2	Did not advance		
María Pía Reaño; Ximena Rodríguez; Alejandra Arana	Team	Canada; L 0-3	Guyana; L 0-3	Colombia; L 0-3	4	—N/a	United States; D 0-3	Classification 5th-8th place Guyana; L 0-3	Seventh place match Chile; L 1-2	8

Mixed

Athlete	Event	Quarterfinal	Semifinal	Final / BM	
Athlete	Event	Opposition Result	Opposition Result	Opposition Result	Rank
Andrés Quesada; María Pía Reaño	Doubles	Douglas / Blatchford (USA); L 0-2	Did not advance		

== Surfing ==
Peru as host nation received a quota allocation of ten surfers (five men and five women) in the sport's debut at the Pan American Games.

Of the 8 medal events (Four Men and four Women), Peru won 3 gold medals, 3 silver medals and 1 bronze. Lucca Mesinas (Open surf Men), "Piccolo" Benoit Clemente (Longboard) and Daniella Rosas (Open surg Women) made history for Peru winning three gold medals in a day. Also Tamil Martino (Stand up paddle Men), Vania Torres (Stand up paddle Women) and María Fernanda Reyes (Longboard Women) got 3 silver medals. Itzel Delgado won the first medal of this sport for Peru in Stand up paddle race. The Stand up paddle race Women was the only event where Peru got no winners at all.

Artistic

Athlete	Event	Round 1	Round 2	Round 3	Round 4	Repechage 1	Repechage 2	Repechage 3	Repechage 4	Repechage 5	Bronze medal	Final	
Athlete	Event	Opposition Result	Opposition Result	Opposition Result	Opposition Result	Opposition Result	Opposition Result	Opposition Result	Opposition Result	Opposition Result	Opposition Result	Opposition Result	Rank
Lucca Mesinas	Men's open	Madrid (URU); W 14.34–9.00 Q	Usuna (ARG); W 14.07–12.50 Q	McGonagle (CRC); W 15.94–9.90 Q	Pérez (ESA); W 17.47–8.60 Q	Bye					—N/a	Usuna (ARG); W 14.00–13.77 Q	1st place, gold medalist(s)
Alonso Correa	Men's open	McGonagle (CRC); L 9.33–13.40	Did not advance			Schulz (USA); W 10.84–8.10 Q	Young (CAN); W 16.00–11.47 Q	Usuna (ARG); L 12.83–13.00	Did not advance				
Tamil Martino	Men's stand up paddleboard	Spencer (CAN), de Armas (PUR); W 15.34 Q	Gómez (COL), Rodríguez (MEX); W 14.17 Q	Hughes (USA); W 14.93–9.26 'Q	Gómez (COL); L 12.57–14.84	Bye					Hughes (USA); W 18.90–10.84 Q	Gómez (COL); L 14.70–17.33	2nd place, silver medalist(s)
Benoit Clemente	Men's longboard	Schweizer (URU), Villao (ECU); W 11.67 Q	Conceição (BRA), Flores (CRC); W 18.80 Q	Schweizer (URU); W 18.10–15.70 Q	Robbins (USA); W 15.67–13.27 Q	Bye					—N/a	Schweizer (URU); W 19.13–11.73 Q	1st place, gold medalist(s)
Daniella Rosas	Women's open	Thompson (USA); W 10.66–8.80 Q	Tuach (BAR); W 15.27–7.00 Q	Pellizzari (ARG); W 14.17–11.67 Q	Barona (ECU); W 12.40–5.07 Q	Bye					—N/a	Barona (ECU); W 13.90–12.50 Q	1st place, gold medalist(s)
Melanie Giunta	Women's open	Pellizzari (ARG); L 2.46–13.33	Did not advance			Cortez (ESA); W 11.33–4.70 Q	Zelasko (CAN); W 13.67–9.00 Q	Gómez (COL); W 13.93–13.26 Q	Pellizzari (ARG); L 1.57–12.90	Did not advance			
Vania Torres	Women's stand up paddleboard	Pacelli (BRA), Bruhwiler (CAN); W 11.33 Q	Gómez (COL), Alabi (ESA); W 9.50 Q	Appleby (USA); W 8.37–4.87 Q	Pacelli (BRA); W 13.17–5.73 Q	Bye					—N/a	Gómez (COL); L 9.94–10.73	2nd place, silver medalist(s)
María Fernanda Reyes	Women's longboard	Soriano (ECU), Fernandez (CHI); W 12.66 Q	Thompson (USA), Gil (ARG); L 5.06	Did not advance		Bye	Machuca (MEX); W 13.83–2.40 Q	Thompson (USA); W 13.97–10.86 Q	Gil (ARG); W 10.83–7.26 Q	—N/a	Dempfle-Olin (CAN); W 13.50–8.70 Q	Calmon (BRA); L 12.76–15.36	2nd place, silver medalist(s)

Race

Athlete	Event	Time	Rank
Itzel Delgado	Men's stand up paddleboard	26:24.3	3rd place, bronze medalist(s)
Giannisa Vecco	Women's stand up paddleboard	38:24.5	6

== Table tennis ==
Men

Athlete	Event	Group stage			Round of 32	Round of 16	Quarterfinal	Semifinal	Final / BM	
Athlete	Event	Opposition Result	Opposition Result	Rank	Opposition Result	Opposition Result	Opposition Result	Opposition Result	Opposition Result	Rank
Rodrigo Hidalgo	Singles	—N/a			Lamadrid (CHI); L 0–4	Did not advance				
Bryan Blas	Singles	—N/a			Alto (ARG); L 0–4	Did not advance				
Bryan Blas; Johan Chávez	Doubles	—N/a				Madrid / Villa (MEX); L 1–4	Did not advance			
Bryan Blas; Johan Chávez; Rodrigo Hidalgo	Team	Argentina; L 1–3	Paraguay; L 1–3	3	—N/a		Did not advance			

Women

Athlete	Event	Group stage			Round of 32	Round of 16	Quarterfinal	Semifinal	Final / BM	
Athlete	Event	Opposition Result	Opposition Result	Rank	Opposition Result	Opposition Result	Opposition Result	Opposition Result	Opposition Result	Rank
Angela Mori	Singles	—N/a			Silva (MEX); L 1–4	Did not advance				
Francesca Vargas	Singles	—N/a			Zhang (USA); L 0–4	Did not advance				
Angela Mori; Francesca Vargas	Doubles	—N/a				Castro / Ortíz (DOM); L 1–4	Did not advance			
Angela Mori; Francesca Vargas; Isabel Duffoo	Team	Canada; L 1–3	Chile; L 0–3	3	—N/a		Did not advance			

Mixed

Athlete	Event	Round of 16	Quarterfinal	Semifinal	Final / BM	
Athlete	Event	Opposition Result	Opposition Result	Opposition Result	Opposition Result	Rank
Rodrigo Hidalgo; Francesca Vargas	Doubles	Lamadrid / Vega (CHI); L 0–4	Did not advance			

== Taekwondo ==
Kyorugi (sparring)

Men

Athlete	Event	Preliminary round	Quarterfinal	Semifinal	Repechage	Final / BM	
Athlete	Event	Opposition Result	Opposition Result	Opposition Result	Opposition Result	Opposition Result	Rank
Luis Oblitas	–58 kg	Mansell (NCA); W 19–8	Granado (VEN); L 7–27	Did not advance			
Braulio León	–68 kg	Caicedo (ECU); W 17–15	Morales (CHI); L 5–20	Did not advance			
Franco Aurora	–80 kg	Trejos (COL); L 13–34	Did not advance				
Christian Ocampo	+80 kg	Álvarez (PUR); L 1–21	Did not advance				

Women

Athlete	Event	Preliminary round	Quarterfinal	Semifinal	Repechage	Final / BM	
Athlete	Event	Opposition Result	Opposition Result	Opposition Result	Opposition Result	Opposition Result	Rank
Julissa Diez Canseco	–49 kg	Vargas (NCA); W 11–8	Souza (MEX); L 0–9	Did not advance	Bucheli (ECU); W 3–0	Bronze medal contest Ramírez (COL); L 9–14	5
Aittana Moya	–57 kg	Évolo (ARG); L 3–7	Did not advance				
Diana Chirinos	–67 kg	Rodríguez (DOM); L 2–22	Did not advance				
Camila Orihuella	+67kg	Cuma (CAN); L 3–14	Did not advance				

Poomsae (forms)

Athlete	Event	Score	Rank
Hugo Del Castillo	Men's individual	7.490	2nd place, silver medalist(s)
Marcella Castillo	Women's individual	7.530	2nd place, silver medalist(s)
Renzo Saux; Ariana Vera	Mixed pair	7.010	3rd place, bronze medalist(s)
Marcela Castillo; Hugo Del Castillo; Jose Montejo; Renzo Saux; Ariana Vera	Mixed freestyle team	6.580	6

== Tennis ==
Men

Athlete	Event	Round of 64	Round of 32	Round of 16	Quarterfinal	Semifinal	Final / BM	
Athlete	Event	Opposition Result	Opposition Result	Opposition Result	Opposition Result	Opposition Result	Opposition Result	Rank
Juan Pablo Varillas	Singles	Bye	Arias (BOL); W 6–1, 6–1	King (BAR); W 6–1, 6–2	Barrios (CHI); L 6–4, 2–6, 6–7	Did not advance		
Nicolás Álvarez	Singles	Pérez (CUB); W 6–0, 6–0	Jarry (CHI); L 2–6, 6–7	Did not advance				
Sergio Galdós	Singles	Roberts (BAH); L 7–6, 6–7, 4–6	Did not advance					
Sergio Galdós; Juan Pablo Varillas	Doubles	—N/a	Bye	King / Lewis (BAR); W 6–7, 6–3, 10–8	Menezes / Wild (BRA); W 6–2, 6–4	Andreozzi / Bagnis (ARG); L 1–6, 5–7	Arias / Zeballos (BOL); W 6–3, 3–6, 12–10	3rd place, bronze medalist(s)

Women

Athlete	Event	Round of 32	Round of 16	Quarterfinal	Semifinal	Final / BM	
Athlete	Event	Opposition Result	Opposition Result	Opposition Result	Opposition Result	Opposition Result	Rank
Dominique Schaefer	Singles	James (GRN); W 7–5, 7–5	Cepede Royg (PAR); L 2–6, 2–6	Did not advance			
Dana Guzmán	Singles	Zarazúa (MEX); L 1–6, 1–6	Did not advance				
Anastasia Iamachkine	Singles	Arconada (USA); L 1–6, 0–6	Did not advance				
Dana Guzmán; Dominique Schaefer	Doubles	—N/a	Bui; Vagramov (CAN); W 6–4, 6–3	Arconada; Dolehide (USA); L 1–6, 1–6	Did not advance		

Mixed

Athlete	Event	Round of 16	Quarterfinal	Semifinal	Final / BM	
Athlete	Event	Opposition Result	Opposition Result	Opposition Result	Opposition Result	Rank
Sergio Galdós; Anastasia Iamachkine	Doubles	Cerúndolo / Bosio (ARG); W 6–3, 6–1	Menezes / Stefani (BRA); W 7–5, 6–4	Zeballos / Zeballos (BOL); L 6–1, 4–6, 2–10	González / Weedon (GUA); W 7–5, 6–1	3rd place, bronze medalist(s)

== Triathlon ==
Individual

Athlete	Event	Swimming (1.5 km)	Transition 1	Biking (40.02 km)	Transition 2	Running (8.88 km)	Total	Rank
Rodrigo Mejía	Men's	18:36	0:50	1:03:19	0:31	37:28	2:00:42	23
José De la Torre	Men's	18:34	0:55	1:03:16	0:26	37:53	2:01:02	24
Ada Mejía	Women's	20:05	0:53	1:13:15	0:29	40:24	2:15:04	20
Blanca Montoya	Women's	22:04	1:01	1:15:00	0:39	DNF		

Mixed relay

Athlete	Event	Swimming (300 m)	Biking (6.6 km)	Running (1.5 km)	Total (including trans.)	Rank
Ada Mejía; José De la Torre; Blanca Montoya; Rodrigo Mejía	Mixed relay	17:05	47:15	22:07	1:31:36	10

== Volleyball ==
=== Beach ===
Peru automatically qualified four beach volleyball athletes (two men and two women) as the host nation.

Athlete	Event	Group stage				Round of 16	Quarterfinal	Semifinal	Final / BM	
Athlete	Event	Opposition Result	Opposition Result	Opposition Result	Rank	Opposition Result	Opposition Result	Opposition Result	Opposition Result	Rank
Gabriel Vásquez; Bruno Seminario	Men's	Medina – Sánchez (DOM); L 0–2 (11–21, 14–21)	Hernández – Gómez (VEN); L 0–2 (8–21, 8–21)	Leonardo – García (GUA); L 0–2 (11–21, 6–21)	4	Bye		13th-16th place classification Mora – López (NCA); L 0–2 (7–21, 15–21)	15th place match Stewart – Phillip (TTO); L 0–2 (19–21, 16–21)	16
Lisbeth Allcca; Medalyn Mendoza	Women's	Vargas – Vasquez (ESA); W 2–0 (21–10, 21–10)	Caballero – Valiente (PAR); L 0–2 (10–21, 17–21)	Delís – Martínez (CUB); L 0–2 (12–21, 11–21)	3	Bye		9th-12th classification Mendoza – Rodriguez (NCA); W 2–1 (18–21, 24–22, 15–11)	9th place match Harnett – Lapointe (CAN); L 0–2 (0–21, 0–21)	10

=== Indoor ===
Summary

Team	Event	Group stage				Semifinal	Final / BM / Pl.	
Team	Event	Opposition Result	Opposition Result	Opposition Result	Rank	Opposition Result	Opposition Result	Rank
Peru men	Men's tournament	Puerto Rico; D 1–3	Argentina; D 0–3	Cuba; D 0–3	4	—N/a	Seventh place match Mexico; D 1–3	8
Peru women	Women's tournament	Canada; W 3–1	Colombia; L 1–3	Dominican Republic; L 0–3	3	—N/a	Fifth place match Puerto Rico; L 2–3	6

=== Men's tournament ===
Preliminary round

Pos	Team	Pld	W	L	Pts	SW	SL	SR	SPW	SPL	SPR	Qualification
1	Argentina	3	3	0	15	9	0	MAX	231	183	1.262	Semifinals
2	Cuba	3	2	1	9	6	4	1.500	245	214	1.145	Semifinals
3	Puerto Rico	3	1	2	5	4	7	0.571	228	245	0.931	5th–6th place match
4	Peru (H)	3	0	3	1	1	9	0.111	187	249	0.751	7th–8th place match

Source: Lima 2019
(H) Host

31 July 2019; 12:30	Peru	1–3	Puerto Rico	Callao Sports Center; Referees: José Alejandro Muñoz (CHI), Ricardo Borroto Iglesias (CUB)
31 July 2019; 12:30	(14–25, 20–25, 25–21, 11–25); P2 P3			Callao Sports Center; Referees: José Alejandro Muñoz (CHI), Ricardo Borroto Iglesias (CUB)

1 August 2019; 12:30	Peru	0–3	Argentina	Callao Sports Center; Referees: Randy Sánchez (MEX), David Reyes (PUR)
1 August 2019; 12:30	(16–25, 25–27, 24–26); P2 P3			Callao Sports Center; Referees: Randy Sánchez (MEX), David Reyes (PUR)

2 August 2019; 14:30	Peru	0–3	Cuba	Callao Sports Center; Referees: David Reyes (PUR), Brian Hemelgarn (USA)
2 August 2019; 14:30	(15–25, 18–25, 19–25); P2 P3			Callao Sports Center; Referees: David Reyes (PUR), Brian Hemelgarn (USA)

Seventh place match

3 August 2019; 12:30	Peru	1–3	Mexico	Callao Sports Center; Referees: Ricardo Borroto (PUR), Nicolás Casado (ARG)
3 August 2019; 12:30	(25–27, 24–26, 27–25, 13–25); P2 P3			Callao Sports Center; Referees: Ricardo Borroto (PUR), Nicolás Casado (ARG)

=== Women's tournament ===
Preliminary round

Pos	Team	Pld	W	L	Pts	SW	SL	SR	SPW	SPL	SPR	Qualification
1	Dominican Republic	3	3	0	14	9	1	9.000	252	212	1.189	Semifinals
2	Colombia	3	2	1	9	7	5	1.400	289	274	1.055	Semifinals
3	Peru (H)	3	1	2	5	4	7	0.571	239	252	0.948	5th–6th place match
4	Canada	3	0	3	2	2	9	0.222	224	266	0.842	7th–8th place match

Source: Lima 2019
(H) Host

7 August 2019; 20:30	Peru	3–1	Canada	Callao Sports Center; Referees: Héctor Ortiz (PUR), Jediel Hosana de Carvalho (BRA)
7 August 2019; 20:30	(25–17, 25–21, 22–25, 25–18); P2			Callao Sports Center; Referees: Héctor Ortiz (PUR), Jediel Hosana de Carvalho (BRA)

8 August 2019; 20:30	Peru	1–3	Colombia	Callao Sports Center
8 August 2019; 20:30	(25–21, 22–25, 21–25, 22–25); P2 P3			Callao Sports Center

9 August 2019; 20:30	Peru	0–3	Dominican Republic	Callao Sports Center
9 August 2019; 20:30	(19–25, 16–25, 17–25); P2 P3			Callao Sports Center

Fifth place match

10 August 2019; 15:00	Peru	2–3	Puerto Rico	Callao Sports Center
10 August 2019; 15:00	(25–22, 18–25, 20–25, 25–15, 13–15); P2 P3			Callao Sports Center

== Water polo ==
Peru automatically qualified a men's team (of 11 athletes) and a women's team (of 11 athletes) as hosts.

Summary

Team	Event	Group stage				Quarterfinal	Semifinal	Final / BM / Pl.	
Team	Event	Opposition Result	Opposition Result	Opposition Result	Rank	Opposition Result	Opposition Result	Opposition Result	Rank
Peru men	Men's tournament	Brazil; L 2–14	Argentina; L 6–12	Mexico; L 8–14	4 Q	United States; L 2–24	5th-8th place classification Cuba; L 5–17	Seventh place match Mexico; L 5–16	8
Peru women	Women's tournament	Mexico; L 1–22	Canada; L 2–28	Cuba; L 5–19	4 Q	United States; L 3–21	5th-8th place classification Puerto Rico; L 4–15	Seventh place match Venezuela; L 7–14	8

=== Men's tournament ===
Preliminary round

Pos	Team	Pld	W	D	L	GF	GA	GD	Pts	Qualification
1	Brazil	3	3	0	0	36	14	+22	6	Quarterfinals
2	Argentina	3	2	0	1	32	29	+3	4	Quarterfinals
3	Mexico	3	1	0	2	30	31	−1	2	Quarterfinals
4	Peru (H)	3	0	0	3	16	40	−24	0	Quarterfinals

Source: Lima 2019
Rules for classification: 1) points; 2) head-to-head points; 3) head-to-head goal difference; 4) head-to-head number of goals scored; 5) goal difference.
(H) Hosts

4 August 2019; 16:30	Report	Peru	2–14	Brazil	Villa María del Triunfo Aquatic Centre, Lima; Referees: José Ortiz (PUR); Steven Rotsart (USA)
4 August 2019; 16:30	Report	Score by quarters: 0–3, 0–3, 1–5, 1–3			Villa María del Triunfo Aquatic Centre, Lima; Referees: José Ortiz (PUR); Steven Rotsart (USA)
4 August 2019; 16:30	Report	Alzamora, Villar 1	Goals	three players 3	Villa María del Triunfo Aquatic Centre, Lima; Referees: José Ortiz (PUR); Steven Rotsart (USA)

5 August 2019; 19:30	Report	Peru	6–12	Argentina	Villa María del Triunfo Aquatic Centre, Lima; Referees: Reinel Castillo (PUR); Steven Rotsart (USA)
5 August 2019; 19:30	Report	Score by quarters: 1–3, 2–2, 1–5, 2–2			Villa María del Triunfo Aquatic Centre, Lima; Referees: Reinel Castillo (PUR); Steven Rotsart (USA)
5 August 2019; 19:30	Report	Rodríguez, Villar 2	Goals	Yáñez 4	Villa María del Triunfo Aquatic Centre, Lima; Referees: Reinel Castillo (PUR); Steven Rotsart (USA)

6 August 2019; 16:30	Report	Peru	8–14	Mexico	Villa María del Triunfo Aquatic Centre, Lima; Referees: Yasmany Lima (CUB); Leonardo González (VEN)
6 August 2019; 16:30	Report	Score by quarters: 1–4, 0–3, 4–3, 3–4			Villa María del Triunfo Aquatic Centre, Lima; Referees: Yasmany Lima (CUB); Leonardo González (VEN)
6 August 2019; 16:30	Report	Villar 3	Goals	Álvarez 4	Villa María del Triunfo Aquatic Centre, Lima; Referees: Yasmany Lima (CUB); Leonardo González (VEN)

Quarterfinal

8 August 2019; 18:00	Report	United States	24–2	Peru	Villa María del Triunfo Aquatic Centre, Lima; Referees: Daniel Daners (URU); Gerardo Arellano (MEX)
8 August 2019; 18:00	Report	Score by quarters: 4–0, 8–2, 6–0, 6–0			Villa María del Triunfo Aquatic Centre, Lima; Referees: Daniel Daners (URU); Gerardo Arellano (MEX)
8 August 2019; 18:00	Report	Bowen, Hallock 4	Goals	Alzamora, Villar 1	Villa María del Triunfo Aquatic Centre, Lima; Referees: Daniel Daners (URU); Gerardo Arellano (MEX)

5th–8th place semifinals

9 August 2019; 16:30	Report	Cuba	17–5	Peru	Villa María del Triunfo Aquatic Centre, Lima; Referees: Steven Rotsart (USA); Marcus Gresele (BRA)
9 August 2019; 16:30	Report	Score by quarters: 5–1, 0–0, 5–1, 7–3			Villa María del Triunfo Aquatic Centre, Lima; Referees: Steven Rotsart (USA); Marcus Gresele (BRA)
9 August 2019; 16:30	Report	Carales 8	Goals	Otero, Villar 2	Villa María del Triunfo Aquatic Centre, Lima; Referees: Steven Rotsart (USA); Marcus Gresele (BRA)

Seventh place match

10 August 2019; 15:00	Report	Mexico	16–5	Peru	Villa María del Triunfo Aquatic Centre, Lima; Referees: Yasmany Lima (CUB); Reinel Castillo (PUR)
10 August 2019; 15:00	Report	Score by quarters: 4–0, 4–0, 5–3, 3–2			Villa María del Triunfo Aquatic Centre, Lima; Referees: Yasmany Lima (CUB); Reinel Castillo (PUR)
10 August 2019; 15:00	Report	Álvarez 8	Goals	five players 1	Villa María del Triunfo Aquatic Centre, Lima; Referees: Yasmany Lima (CUB); Reinel Castillo (PUR)

=== Women's tournament ===
Preliminary round

Pos	Team	Pld	W	D	L	GF	GA	GD	Pts	Qualification
1	Canada	3	3	0	0	75	13	+62	6	Quarterfinals
2	Cuba	3	2	0	1	37	29	+8	4	Quarterfinals
3	Mexico	3	1	0	2	32	41	−9	2	Quarterfinals
4	Peru (H)	3	0	0	3	8	69	−61	0	Quarterfinals

Source: Lima 2019
Rules for classification: 1) points; 2) head-to-head points; 3) head-to-head goal difference; 4) head-to-head number of goals scored; 5) goal difference.
(H) Hosts

4 August 2019; 12:30	Report	Peru	1–22	Mexico	Villa María del Triunfo Aquatic Centre, Lima; Referees: Daniel Daners (URU); Diego Garibaldi (ARG)
4 August 2019; 12:30	Report	Score by quarters: 0-8, 1-5, 0-6, 0-3			Villa María del Triunfo Aquatic Centre, Lima; Referees: Daniel Daners (URU); Diego Garibaldi (ARG)
4 August 2019; 12:30	Report	Asmat 1	Goals	Livas 5	Villa María del Triunfo Aquatic Centre, Lima; Referees: Daniel Daners (URU); Diego Garibaldi (ARG)

5 August 2019; 9:30	Report	Peru	2–28	Canada	Villa María del Triunfo Aquatic Centre, Lima; Referees: Marcus Gresele (BRA); Ángel Irizarry (PUR)
5 August 2019; 9:30	Report	Score by quarters: 0-9, 0-6, 1-7, 1-6			Villa María del Triunfo Aquatic Centre, Lima; Referees: Marcus Gresele (BRA); Ángel Irizarry (PUR)
5 August 2019; 9:30	Report	Deza, Urquiza 1	Goals	Crevier, Wright 5	Villa María del Triunfo Aquatic Centre, Lima; Referees: Marcus Gresele (BRA); Ángel Irizarry (PUR)

6 August 2019; 9:30	Report	Cuba	19–5	Peru	Villa María del Triunfo Aquatic Centre, Lima; Referees: Reynel Torres (PUR); Amber Drury (USA)
6 August 2019; 9:30	Report	Score by quarters: 4-0, 6-0, 4-1, 5-4			Villa María del Triunfo Aquatic Centre, Lima; Referees: Reynel Torres (PUR); Amber Drury (USA)
6 August 2019; 9:30	Report	Villa 4	Goals	Deza 2	Villa María del Triunfo Aquatic Centre, Lima; Referees: Reynel Torres (PUR); Amber Drury (USA)

Quarterfinal

8 August 2019; 11:00	Report	United States	21–3	Peru	VMT Aquatic Centre, Lima; Referees: Marcus Paulo Gresele (BRA); Leonardo González Toledo (VEN)
8 August 2019; 11:00	Report	Score by quarters: 5–1, 6–1, 6–0, 4–1			VMT Aquatic Centre, Lima; Referees: Marcus Paulo Gresele (BRA); Leonardo González Toledo (VEN)

5th–8th place semifinals

9 August 2019; 09:30	Report	Puerto Rico	15–4	Peru	VMT Aquatic Centre, Lima; Referees: Marie-Claude Deslières (CAN); Yasmany Lima (CUB)
9 August 2019; 09:30	Report	Score by quarters: 3–0, 4–1, 3–1, 5–2			VMT Aquatic Centre, Lima; Referees: Marie-Claude Deslières (CAN); Yasmany Lima (CUB)

Seventh place match

10 August 2019; 08:00	Report	Venezuela	14–7	Peru	VMT Aquatic Centre, Lima; Referees: Gerardo de Jesús Arellano Báez (MEX); Marcus Paulo Gresele (BRA)
10 August 2019; 08:00	Report	Score by quarters: 3–3, 2–1, 5–1, 4–2			VMT Aquatic Centre, Lima; Referees: Gerardo de Jesús Arellano Báez (MEX); Marcus Paulo Gresele (BRA)

== Water skiing ==
Water skiing

Men

Athlete	Event	Preliminary		Final				
Athlete	Event	Score	Rank	Slalom	Jump	Tricks	Total	Rank
Rafael de Osma	Slalom	0.50/58/11.25	14	Did not advance				
Rafael de Osma	Tricks	6650	8 Q	—N/a	—N/a	6470	6470	7
Rafael de Osma	Jump	178	7 Q	—N/a	182	—N/a	182	6
Rafael de Osma	Overall	2128.37	7	Did not advance				
Felipe Franco	Slalom	1.00/58/16.00	17	Did not advance				
Felipe Franco	Tricks	7320	7 Q	—N/a	—N/a	8180	8180	5
Felipe Franco	Overall	1001.05	12	Did not advance				

Women

Athlete	Event	Preliminary		Final				
Athlete	Event	Score	Rank	Slalom	Jump	Tricks	Total	Rank
María de Osma	Slalom	2.00/55/11.25	5 Q	2.00/55/11.25	—N/a	—N/a	2.00/55/11.25	4
María de Osma	Tricks	6050	8	Did not advance				
María de Osma	Jump	144	6 Q	—N/a	144	—N/a	144	6
María de Osma	Overall	1705.59	7	Did not advance				
Natalia Cuglievan	Tricks	7970	5 Q	—N/a	—N/a	9910	9910	1st place, gold medalist(s)

Wakeboarding

Athlete	Event	Semifinal		Last chance qualifier		Final	
Athlete	Event	Score	Rank	Score	Rank	Score	Rank
Manuel Ballon	Men's	31.22	4 R	40.00	3	Did not advance	

== Weightlifting ==
As host nation, Peru was permitted to enter a full team of 12 weightlifters (six men and six women).

Men

Athlete	Event	Snatch		Clean & Jerk		Total	Rank
Athlete	Event	Result	Rank	Result	Rank	Total	Rank
Marcos Rojas	61 kg	116	7	145	7	261	7
Luis Bardalez	67 kg	127	5	164	3	291	3rd place, bronze medalist(s)
Óscar Terrones	73 kg	141	5	163	7	304	5
Santiago Villegas	73 kg	122	10	160	9	282	9
Amel Atencia	96 kg	123	15	160	14	284	15
Hernán Viera	109 kg	140	6	180	6	320	6

Women

Athlete	Event	Snatch		Clean & Jerk		Total	Rank
Athlete	Event	Result	Rank	Result	Rank	Total	Rank
Fiorella Cueva	49 kg	75	7	NM		DNF	
Shoely Mego	55 kg	83	6	110	4	193	6
Angie Cárdenas	64 kg	81	9	106	10	187	10
Eldi Paredes	64 kg	81	8	111	7	153	8
Estrella Saldarriaga	76 kg	83	8	107	8	190	8
Angie Castro	87 kg	78	9	105	9	183	9

== Wrestling ==
Key:
- VT – Victory by fall.
- PP – Decision by points – the loser with technical points.
- PO – Decision by points – the loser without technical points.
- SP – Technical superiority – the loser with technical points and a margin of victory of at least 9 (Greco-Roman) or 10 (freestyle) points.
- ST – Great superiority – the loser without technical points and a margin of victory of at least 8 (Greco-Roman) or 10 (freestyle) points.
- VA – Decision by withdrawal

Men

Athlete	Event	Round of 16	Quarterfinal	Semifinal	Final / BM	
Athlete	Event	Opposition Result	Opposition Result	Opposition Result	Opposition Result	Rank
Fidel Ramos	Freestyle 57 kg	—N/a	Tigreros (COL); L 0–10	Did not advance		
Luis Mallqui	Freestyle 65 kg	—N/a	Sánchez (ECU); L 4–15	Did not advance		
Abel Herrera	Freestyle 74 kg	—N/a	Burroughs (USA); L 0–10	Did not advance	Bronze medal contest Garzón (CUB); L 0–11	5
Pool Ambrocio	Freestyle 86 kg	Bye	Izquierdo (COL); L 4–6	Did not advance		
Ronald Valverde	Freestyle 97 kg	—N/a	Salas (CUB); L 0–11	Did not advance		
Andrew Gunning	Freestyle 125 kg	—N/a	Gwiazdowski (USA); L 0–10	Did not advance	Bronze medal contest Jarvis (CAN); L 0–7	5
Joao Benavides	Greco-Roman 60 kg	—N/a	Palencia (VEN); L 3–11	Did not advance		
Nilton Soto	Greco-Roman 67 kg	—N/a	Júnior (BRA); W 3–3	Villegas (VEN); L 0–8	Bronze medal contest López (MEX); L 1–3	(bronze) ^{[a]}
Angello Hurtado	Greco-Roman 77 kg	Bye	Benítez (MEX); L 0–8	Did not advance		
Ricardo Cárdenas	Greco-Roman 87 kg	Rau (USA); L 3–5	Did not advance			
Bryan Cruz	Greco-Roman 97 kg	—N/a	Arias (DOM); L 2–4	Did not advance		
Daniel Medina	Greco-Roman 130 kg	—N/a	Santana (DOM); L 0–8	Did not advance		

- ^{67 kg} Shalom Villegas, from Venezuela, lost the silver medal for a doping violation.

Women

Athlete	Event	Round of 16	Quarterfinal	Semifinal	Final / BM	
Athlete	Event	Opposition Result	Opposition Result	Opposition Result	Opposition Result	Rank
Thalía Mallqui	50 kg	—N/a	Guzmán (CUB); L 1–4	Did not advance	Bronze medal contest Mollocana (ECU); W 3–1	3rd place, bronze medalist(s)
Justina Benites	53 kg	—N/a	Argüello (VEN); L 0–4	Did not advance	Bronze medal contest Montero (CUB); L 0–11	5
Martha Olivares	57 kg	Bye	Rodríguez (PUR); L 5–8	Did not advance		
Jannette Mallqui	62 kg	—N/a	Yambo (PUR); L 0–10	Did not advance		
Yanet Sovero	68 kg	—N/a	Mensah (USA); L 0–12	Did not advance	Bronze medal contest Garnica (MEX); L 5–8	5
Diana Cruz	76 kg	—N/a	Ferreira (BRA); L 0–7	Did not advance	Bronze medal contest Capote (CUB); L 0–10	5

== See also ==
- Peru at the 2020 Summer Olympics
