= Judo at the 2019 Pan American Games – Women's 70 kg =

Women's 70 kg at the 2019 Pan American Games
- Venue: Polideportivo 3
- Dates: August 10
- Competitors: 10 from 10 nations

Medalists
Gold medal	Elvismar Rodríguez	Venezuela
Silver medal	Yuri Alvear	Colombia
Bronze medal	Onix Cortés	Cuba
Bronze medal	María Pérez	Puerto Rico

The women's 70 kg competition of the judo events at the 2019 Pan American Games in Lima, Peru, was held on August 10 at the Polideportivo 3.

== Results ==
All times are local (UTC−5)

=== Bracket ===
Round of 16
Ebony Drysdale Daley (JAM)	10
Leslie Villarreal (MEX)	00S3
Xsara Morales (PER)	01S3
Chantal Wright (USA)	11S1

Quarter Finals
María Pérez (PUR)	10
Ebony Drysdale Daley (JAM)	00
Elvismar Rodríguez (VEN)	01
Ellen Santana (BRA)	00S2
Yuri Alvear (COL)	11
Chantal Wright (USA)	00
Onix Cortés (CUB)	10S2
Emily Burt (CAN)	00S3

Semi Finals
María Pérez (PUR)	00S3
Elvismar Rodríguez (VEN)	10S1
Yuri Alvear (COL)	10
Onix Cortés (CUB)	00S2

Final
Elvismar Rodríguez (VEN)	10
Yuri Alvear (COL)	00

=== Repechage round ===
Two bronze medals were awarded.

Repechage		Bronze medal
Ebony Drysdale Daley (JAM)	10S1
Ellen Santana (BRA)	00	Ebony Drysdale Daley (JAM)	00S3
		Onix Cortés (CUB)	10S1

Repechage		Bronze medal
Chantal Wright (USA)	00S2
Emily Burt (CAN)	10	Emily Burt (CAN)	00
		María Pérez (PUR)	10
