= Judo at the 2018 South American Games =

Judo competition

- Venue: Coliseo José Villazón
- Location: (Bolivia) Cochabamba
- Dates: 27–30 May
- Nations: 12

There were fourteen judo events at the 2018 South American Games in Cochabamba, Bolivia. Seven for men and seven for women. The events were held between May 27 and 30 at the Coliseo José Villazón.

== Medal summary ==
=== Medal table ===
| Rank | Nation | Gold | Silver | Bronze | Total |
|---|---|---|---|---|---|
| 1 | Brazil (BRA) | 4 | 5 | 5 | 14 |
| 2 | Colombia (COL) | 3 | 0 | 2 | 5 |
| 3 | Ecuador (ECU) | 3 | 0 | 1 | 4 |
| 4 | Peru (PER) | 2 | 1 | 4 | 7 |
| 5 | Venezuela (VEN) | 1 | 6 | 2 | 9 |
| 6 | Argentina (ARG) | 1 | 1 | 5 | 7 |
| 7 | Uruguay (URU) | 0 | 1 | 1 | 2 |
| 8 | Chile (CHI) | 0 | 0 | 6 | 6 |
| 9 | Panama (PAN) | 0 | 0 | 1 | 1 |
| Totals (9 entries) | | 14 | 14 | 27 | 55 |

=== Men's events ===
| Event | Gold | Silver | Bronze |
|---|---|---|---|
| 60 kg | Lenin Preciado; Ecuador | Robson Penna; Brazil | Hugo Vera; Chile |
| 60 kg | Lenin Preciado; Ecuador | Robson Penna; Brazil | Dilmer Calle; Peru |
| 66 kg | Michael Marcelino; Brazil | Ricardo Valderrama; Venezuela | David Prestes; Uruguay |
| 66 kg | Michael Marcelino; Brazil | Ricardo Valderrama; Venezuela | Sebastián Pérez; Chile |
| 73 kg | Alonso Wong; Peru | David Lima; Brazil | Léider Navarro; Colombia |
| 73 kg | Alonso Wong; Peru | David Lima; Brazil | Sergio Mattey; Venezuela |
| 81 kg | Luis Vega; Argentina | Noel Peña; Venezuela | Tiago Pinho; Brazil |
| 81 kg | Luis Vega; Argentina | Noel Peña; Venezuela | Luis Ángeles; Peru |
| 90 kg | Yuta Galarreta; Peru | Giovanni Ferreira; Brazil | Alexis Duarte; Argentina |
| 90 kg | Yuta Galarreta; Peru | Giovanni Ferreira; Brazil | Francisco Balanta; Colombia |
| 100 kg | Leonardo Gonçalves; Brazil | Pablo Aprahamian; Uruguay | Thomas Briceño; Chile |
| 100 kg | Leonardo Gonçalves; Brazil | Pablo Aprahamian; Uruguay | Frank Alvarado; Peru |
| +100 kg | Freddy Figueroa; Ecuador | Pedro Pineda; Venezuela | João Cesarino Silva; Brazil |
| +100 kg | Freddy Figueroa; Ecuador | Pedro Pineda; Venezuela | Héctor Campos; Argentina |

=== Women's events ===
| Event | Gold | Silver | Bronze |
|---|---|---|---|
| 48 kg | Luz Álvarez; Colombia | Ingrid Perafán; Argentina | Mary Dee Vargas; Chile |
| 48 kg | Luz Álvarez; Colombia | Ingrid Perafán; Argentina | Larissa Farias; Brazil |
| 52 kg | Larissa Pimenta; Brazil | Thalia Gamarra; Peru | Kristine Jiménez; Panama |
| 52 kg | Larissa Pimenta; Brazil | Thalia Gamarra; Peru | Ayelén Elizeche; Argentina |
| 57 kg | Yadinis Amarís; Colombia | Wisneybi Machado; Venezuela | Micaela Hernández; Chile |
| 57 kg | Yadinis Amarís; Colombia | Wisneybi Machado; Venezuela | Gabrielle Gonzaga; Brazil |
| 63 kg | Anrriquelys Barrios; Venezuela | Gabriella Moraes; Brazil | Estefania García; Ecuador |
| 63 kg | Anrriquelys Barrios; Venezuela | Gabriella Moraes; Brazil | Gimena Laffeuillade; Argentina |
| 70 kg | Yuri Alvear; Colombia | Noelys Peña; Venezuela | Bruna da Silva; Brazil |
| 70 kg | Yuri Alvear; Colombia | Noelys Peña; Venezuela | Camila Figueroa; Peru |
| 78 kg | Vanessa Chalá; Ecuador | Laislaine Rocha; Brazil | Jacqueline Usnayo; Chile |
| 78 kg | Vanessa Chalá; Ecuador | Laislaine Rocha; Brazil | Karen León; Venezuela |
| +78 kg | Luiza Cruz; Brazil | Mariannys Hernández; Chile | Elizabeth Álvarez; Argentina |
| +78 kg | Luiza Cruz; Brazil | Mariannys Hernández; Chile | Not awarded |
