= Basque pelota at the 2019 Pan American Games =

- Venue: Villa María del Triunfo Sports Center
- Start date: August 4, 2019
- End date: August 10, 2019
- Competitors: 80 from 12 nations

The Basque pelota competition at the 2019 Pan American Games was held from August 4 to August 10, 2019 in Lima, Peru.

== Medal summary ==
* Host nation (Peru)

Rank	Nation	Gold	Silver	Bronze	Total
1	Mexico	5	1	3	9
2	Argentina	3	2	3	8
3	Peru*	2	0	1	3
4	Cuba	0	5	1	6
5	United States	0	1	0	1
5	Uruguay	0	1	0	1
7	Brazil	0	0	1	1
7	Chile	0	0	1	1
Totals (8 entries)		10	10	10	30

== Events ==
The following events took place at the Villa María del Triunfo Sports Center:

=== Men's events ===
Event	Gold	Silver	Bronze
Doubles trinquete rubber ball	Argentina; Sebastián Andreasen; Santiago Andreasen	Mexico; Daniel García; Isaac Pérez	Chile; Manuel Domínguez; Esteban Romero
Individual fronton rubber ball	Arturo Rodríguez; Mexico	Facundo Andreasen; Argentina	Alejandro González; Cuba
Doubles frontenis	Mexico; Josué López; Luis Molina	United States; Omar Espinoza; Salvador Espinoza	Argentina; Jorge Alberdi; Guillermo Osorio
Doubles fronton leather ball	Argentina; Pablo Fusto; Alfredo Villegas	Cuba; Armando Chappi; Frendy Fernández	Mexico; Rodrigo Ledesma; Miguel Urrutia
Individual hand fronton	David Álvarez; Mexico	Dariel Leiva; Cuba	Filipe Otheguy; Brazil
Individual Peruvian fronton	Cristopher Martínez; Peru	Guillermo Osorio; Argentina	Isaac Pérez; Mexico

=== Women's events ===
Event	Gold	Silver	Bronze
Doubles trinquete rubber ball	Argentina; Cynthia Pinto; María García	Uruguay; María Miranda; Camila Naviliat	Mexico; Paulina Castillo; Rosa Flores
Doubles fronton rubber ball	Mexico; Dulce Figueroa; Laura Puentes	Cuba; Yasmary Medina; Daniela Darriba	Argentina; Sabrina Andrade; Melina Spahn
Doubles frontenis	Mexico; Guadalupe Hernández; Ariana Cepeda	Cuba; Yasmary Medina; Leyanis Castillo	Peru; Nathaly Paredes; Mia Rodríguez
Individual Peruvian fronton	Claudia Suárez; Peru	Wendy Durán; Cuba	Melina Spahn; Argentina

== Participating nations ==
Twelve nations participated:

- Argentina (13)
- Bolivia (1)
- Brazil (1)
- Chile (11)
- Cuba (10)
- El Salvador (1)
- Guatemala (1)
- Mexico (14)
- Peru (14)
- Uruguay (6)
- United States (5)
- Venezuela (3)
