= Judo at the 2023 Central American and Caribbean Games =

Judo competition

Judo Judo at the 2023 Central American and Caribbean Games
- Venue: Gimnasio Nacional José Adolfo Pineda
- Location: San Salvador, El Salvador
- Dates: 4–7 July

Competition at external databases
- Links: JudoInside

The judo competition at the 2023 Central American and Caribbean Games will be held in San Salvador, El Salvador from 4 to 7 July at the Gimnasio Nacional José Adolfo Pineda.

== Medal table ==
* Host nation (El Salvador)

Rank	Nation	Gold	Silver	Bronze	Total
1	Cuba	9	3	2	14
2	Venezuela	2	1	7	10
3	Colombia	2	1	6	9
4	Mexico	1	4	4	9
5	Puerto Rico	1	1	2	4
6	Dominican Republic	0	4	5	9
7	Jamaica	0	1	0	1
8	Costa Rica	0	0	2	2
9	El Salvador*	0	0	1	1
9	Panama	0	0	1	1
Totals (10 entries)		15	15	30	60

== Medal summary ==
=== Men's events ===
Event	Gold	Silver	Bronze
−60 kg	Iván Salas; Venezuela	Ashley McKenzie; Jamaica	Sebastian Sancho; Costa Rica Bernabe Vergara; Panama
−66 kg	Orlando Polanco; Cuba	Robin Jara; Mexico	Willis García; Venezuela Juan Hernández; Colombia
−73 kg	Magdiel Estrada; Cuba	Antonio Tornal; Dominican Republic	Sergio Mattey; Venezuela Gilberto Cardoso; Mexico
−81 kg	Adrián Gandía; Puerto Rico	Jorge Martínez; Cuba	Medickson del Orbe; Dominican Republic Samuel Ayala; Mexico
−90 kg	Iván Silva; Cuba	Robert Florentino; Dominican Republic	Daniel Paz; Colombia Diego Díaz; Mexico
−100 kg	Francisco Balanta; Colombia	Liester Cardona; Cuba	Alexis Esquivel; Mexico Juan Turcios; El Salvador
+100 kg	Andy Granda; Cuba	Sergio del Sol; Mexico	Luis Amézquita; Venezuela José Nova; Dominican Republic

=== Women's events ===
Event	Gold	Silver	Bronze
−48 kg	Erika Lasso; Colombia	Edna Carrillo; Mexico	Zamarit Gregorio; Cuba María Giménez; Venezuela
−52 kg	Yurisleydis Hernández; Cuba	Paulina Martínez; Mexico	Francine Echevarría; Puerto Rico Fabiola Díaz; Venezuela
−57 kg	Arnaes Odelín; Cuba	Kady Cabezo; Venezuela	María Villalba; Colombia Ana Rosa; Dominican Republic
−63 kg	Prisca Awiti Alcaraz; Mexico	Maylín del Toro; Cuba	Katherine Otaño; Dominican Republic Cindy Mera; Colombia
−70 kg	Elvismar Rodríguez; Venezuela	Maria Perez; Puerto Rico	Idelannis Gómez; Cuba Diana Brenes; Costa Rica
−78 kg	Kaliema Antomarchi; Cuba	Eiraima Silvestre; Dominican Republic	Brenda Olaya; Colombia Sairy Colón; Puerto Rico
+78 kg	Idalys Ortiz; Cuba	Brigitte Carabalí; Colombia	Moira Morillo; Dominican Republic Amarantha Urdaneta; Venezuela

=== Mixed events ===
Event	Gold	Silver	Bronze
Team	Cuba (CUB); Maylín del Toro; Idelannis Gomez; Kaliema Antomarchi; Idalys Ortiz; Yurisleydis Hernandez; Arnaes Odelin; Orlando Polanco; Magdiel Estrada; Jorge Martinez; Ivan Silva; Liester Cardona	Dominican Republic (DOM); Antfernee Pepin; Elmert Ramirez; Antonio Tornal; Medickson del Orbe; Robert Florentino; Ariel Lorenzo; José Nova; Ana Rosa; Coral Velasquez; Katherine Otaño; Creymailin Valdez; Moira Morillo; Eiraima Silvestre	Colombia (COL); Brigitte Carabalí; Brenda Olaya; Arkangel Barboza; Francisco Balanta; Daniel Paz; María Villalba; Luisa Bonilla; Juan Hernández Venezuela (VEN); Luis Amézquita; Iván Salas; Elvismar Rodriguez; Antonio Rodriguez; Sergio Mattey; Kady Cabezo; Jonhelius Patete; Carlos Paez; Amarantha Urdaneta; Fabiola Diaz
