= Judo at the 2019 Pan American Games =

Judo Judo at the 2019 Pan American Games
- Venue: Polideportivo 3
- Location: Lima, Peru
- Dates: August 8–11, 2019
- No. of events: 14 (7 men, 7 women)
- Competitors: 140 from 25 nations

Competition at external databases
- Links: JudoInside

Judo competitions at the 2019 Pan American Games in Lima, Peru were held between August 8 and 11, 2019 at the Polideportivo 1, which also hosted handball.

14 medal events were contested: seven weight categories each for men and women.

The event awarded ranking points towards selection for the 2020 Summer Olympics in Tokyo, Japan.

== Medal table ==
* Host nation (Peru)

Rank	Nation	Gold	Silver	Bronze	Total
1	Cuba	5	2	6	13
2	Brazil	4	1	4	9
3	Dominican Republic	3	1	1	5
4	Venezuela	1	2	1	4
5	Chile	1	0	1	2
6	Colombia	0	3	0	3
7	Ecuador	0	1	3	4
7	United States	0	1	3	4
9	Peru*	0	1	2	3
9	Puerto Rico	0	1	2	3
11	Mexico	0	1	1	2
12	Panama	0	0	2	2
13	Canada	0	0	1	1
13	Costa Rica	0	0	1	1
Totals (14 entries)		14	14	28	56

== Medalists ==
=== Men's events ===
Event	Gold	Silver	Bronze
60 kg	Renan Torres; Brazil	Lenin Preciado; Ecuador	Roberto Almenares; Cuba
60 kg	Renan Torres; Brazil	Lenin Preciado; Ecuador	Adonis Diaz; United States
66 kg	Wander Mateo; Dominican Republic	Daniel Cargnin; Brazil	Ricardo Valderrama; Venezuela
66 kg	Wander Mateo; Dominican Republic	Daniel Cargnin; Brazil	Osniel Solís; Cuba
73 kg	Magdiel Estrada; Cuba	Alonso Wong; Peru	Jeferson Santos Junior; Brazil
73 kg	Magdiel Estrada; Cuba	Alonso Wong; Peru	Nicholas Delpopolo; United States
81 kg	Eduardo Yudy Santos; Brazil	Medickson del Orbe; Dominican Republic	Adrián Gandía; Puerto Rico
81 kg	Eduardo Yudy Santos; Brazil	Medickson del Orbe; Dominican Republic	Jorge Martínez; Cuba
90 kg	Iván Felipe Silva Morales; Cuba	Francisco Balanta; Colombia	Mohab Elnahas; Canada
90 kg	Iván Felipe Silva Morales; Cuba	Francisco Balanta; Colombia	Yuta Galarreta; Peru
100 kg	Thomas Briceño; Chile	L.A. Smith III; United States	Lewis Medina; Dominican Republic
100 kg	Thomas Briceño; Chile	L.A. Smith III; United States	Junior Angulo; Ecuador
+100 kg	Andy Granda; Cuba	Pedro Pineda; Venezuela	Freddy Figueroa; Ecuador
+100 kg	Andy Granda; Cuba	Pedro Pineda; Venezuela	David Moura; Brazil

=== Women's events ===
Event	Gold	Silver	Bronze
48 kg	Estefanía Soriano; Dominican Republic	Vanesa Godines Alemán; Cuba	Mary Dee Vargas; Chile
48 kg	Estefanía Soriano; Dominican Republic	Vanesa Godines Alemán; Cuba	Edna Carrillo; Mexico
52 kg	Larissa Pimenta; Brazil	Luz Olvera; Mexico	Kristine Jiménez; Panama
52 kg	Larissa Pimenta; Brazil	Luz Olvera; Mexico	Nahomys Acosta; Cuba
57 kg^{[a]}	Ana Rosa; Dominican Republic	Yadinis Amarís; Colombia	Anailys Dorvigny; Cuba
57 kg^{[a]}	Ana Rosa; Dominican Republic	Yadinis Amarís; Colombia	Miryam Roper; Panama
63 kg	Maylín del Toro; Cuba	Anriquelis Barrios; Venezuela	Alexia Castilhos; Brazil
63 kg	Maylín del Toro; Cuba	Anriquelis Barrios; Venezuela	Hannah Martin; United States
70 kg	Elvismar Rodríguez; Venezuela	Yuri Alvear; Colombia	Onix Cortés; Cuba
70 kg	Elvismar Rodríguez; Venezuela	Yuri Alvear; Colombia	María Pérez; Puerto Rico
78 kg	Mayra Aguiar; Brazil	Kaliema Antomarchi; Cuba	Diana Brenes; Costa Rica
78 kg	Mayra Aguiar; Brazil	Kaliema Antomarchi; Cuba	Vanessa Chalá; Ecuador
+78 kg	Idalys Ortiz; Cuba	Melissa Mojica; Puerto Rico	Beatriz Souza; Brazil
+78 kg	Idalys Ortiz; Cuba	Melissa Mojica; Puerto Rico	Yuliana Bolívar; Peru

- ^{57 kg} Rafaela Silva of Brazil was stripped of her gold medal due to a doping violation.

== Participating nations ==
A total of 25 countries qualified judokas. The number of athletes a nation entered is in parentheses beside the name of the country.

- Argentina (8)
- Aruba (1)
- Bahamas (2)
- Brazil (14)
- Canada (7)
- Chile (5)
- Colombia (10)
- Costa Rica (1)
- Cuba (14)
- Dominican Republic (9)
- Ecuador (5)
- El Salvador (1)
- Guatemala (2)
- Haiti (1)
- Honduras (1)
- Jamaica (1)
- Mexico (12)
- Nicaragua (1)
- Panama (4)
- Peru (14)
- Puerto Rico (4)
- Trinidad and Tobago (1)
- United States (13)
- Uruguay (1)
- Venezuela (8)

== Qualification ==
A total of 140 judokas qualified to compete at the games. The top nine athletes (one per NOC) in each weight category's ranking after four qualification tournaments qualified along with one spot per category for the host nation, Peru. Each nation can enter a maximum of 14 athletes (seven men and seven women).

== See also ==
- Judo at the 2020 Summer Olympics
