= Judo at the 2023 Pan American Games – Women's 57 kg =

Judo Women's 57 kg at the 2023 Pan American Games
- Venue: Contact Sports Center
- Location: Santiago, Chile
- Date: 28 October
- Competitors: 10 from 11 nations
- Website: Official website

Medalists
gold medal	Rafaela Silva (1st title)	Brazil
silver medal	Brisa Gómez	Argentina
bronze medal	Kristine Jiménez	Panama
bronze medal	María Villalba	Colombia

Competition at external databases
- Links: IJF

The women's 57 kg competition of the judo events at the 2023 Pan American Games was held on 28 October at the Contact Sports Center (Centro de Entrenamiento de los Deportes de Contacto) in Santiago, Chile. A total of 11 athletes from 10 NOCs competed.

== Schedule ==
All times are local (UTC−3)

Date	Time	Event
Saturday, 28 October 2023	10:00	Elimination round of 16
Saturday, 28 October 2023	11:00	Quarterfinals
Saturday, 28 October 2023	12:00	Repechage
Saturday, 28 October 2023	12:00	Semifinals
Saturday, 28 October 2023	15:00	Finals

== Results ==
=== Main Bracket ===
Round of 16
Mariah Holguin (USA)	00 (yellow card)
Kristine Jiménez (PAN)	01
Astrid Gavidia (ECU)	10 (yellow card)
Marian Flores (PER)	00
Elizabeth Segura (CHI)	00
Tasha Cancela (USA)	10 (yellow card)

Quarter-finals
Rafaela Silva (BRA)	10 (yellow card)
Kristine Jiménez (PAN)	00
María Villalba (COL)	10
Astrid Gavidia (ECU)	00
Brisa Gómez (ARG)	10
Renata Ortiz (MEX)	00
Ana Rosa García (DOM)	10 (yellow card)
Tasha Cancela (USA)	00

Semi-finals
Rafaela Silva (BRA)	10 (yellow card)
María Villalba (COL)	00 (yellow card)
Brisa Gómez (ARG)	10
Ana Rosa García (DOM)	00

Gold medal contest
Rafaela Silva (BRA)	10
Brisa Gómez (ARG)	00 (yellow card)

=== Repechage ===
Repechage
Kristine Jiménez (PAN)	01
Astrid Gavidia (ECU)	00 (yellow card)
Renata Ortiz (MEX)	00
Tasha Cancela (USA)	10 (yellow card)

Bronze medal contests
Kristine Jiménez (PAN)	01
Ana Rosa García (DOM)	00
Tasha Cancela (USA)	00
María Villalba (COL)	10 (yellow card)
