= 2021 Pan American Judo Championships =

Judo competition

2021 Judo Pan American Judo Championships
- Venue: Guadalajara
- Location: Guadalajara, Mexico
- Dates: 15–16 April 2021
- Competitors: 113 from 20 nations

Competition at external databases
- Links: IJF • JudoInside

The 2021 Pan American Judo Championships was a judo event which took place in Guadalajara, Mexico, from 15 to 16 April 2021.

== Medal table ==
* Host nation (Mexico)

Rank	Nation	Gold	Silver	Bronze	Total
1	Brazil (BRA)	7	4	3	14
2	Ecuador (ECU)	2	2	3	7
3	Cuba (CUB)	2	2	0	4
4	Chile (CHI)	1	1	0	2
5	Dominican Republic (DOM)	1	0	2	3
6	Canada (CAN)	1	0	1	2
7	United States (USA)	0	2	5	7
8	Mexico (MEX)*	0	1	5	6
9	Peru (PER)	0	1	3	4
10	Argentina (ARG)	0	1	0	1
11	Colombia (COL)	0	0	1	1
11	Costa Rica (CRC)	0	0	1	1
11	Panama (PAN)	0	0	1	1
11	Puerto Rico (PUR)	0	0	1	1
11	Venezuela (VEN)	0	0	1	1
Totals (15 entries)		14	14	27	55

== Results ==
=== Men's events ===
Event	Gold	Silver	Bronze
Extra-lightweight (60 kg)	Lenin Preciado; Ecuador	Steven Morocho; Ecuador	Dilmer Calle; Peru Moisés Rosado; Mexico
Half-lightweight (66 kg)	Willian Lima; Brazil	Orlando Polanco; Cuba	Wander Mateo; Dominican Republic Juan Postigos; Peru
Lightweight (73 kg)	Magdiel Estrada; Cuba	Alonso Wong; Peru	Gilberto Cardoso; Mexico Julián Sancho; Costa Rica
Half-middleweight (81 kg)	Guilherme Schimidt; Brazil	Emmanuel Lucenti; Argentina	Samuel Ayala; Mexico Medickson del Orbe; Dominican Republic
Middleweight (90 kg)	Robert Florentino; Dominican Republic	Rafael Macedo; Brazil	Francisco Balanta; Colombia Yuta Galarreta; Peru
Half-heavyweight (100 kg)	Kyle Reyes; Canada	Thomas Briceño; Chile	Leonardo Gonçalves; Brazil Nathaniel Keeve; United States
Heavyweight (+100 kg)	Rafael Silva; Brazil	David Moura; Brazil	Sergio del Sol; Mexico Freddy Figueroa; Ecuador

=== Women's events ===
Event	Gold	Silver	Bronze
Extra-lightweight (48 kg)	Mary Dee Vargas; Chile	Gabriela Chibana; Brazil	Nathalia Brigida; Brazil Luz Peña; Ecuador
Half-lightweight (52 kg)	Larissa Pimenta; Brazil	Angelica Delgado; United States	Katelyn Jarrell-Bouyssou; United States Kristine Jiménez; Panama
Lightweight (57 kg)	Arnaes Odelín; Cuba	Ketelyn Nascimento; Brazil	Jéssica Pereira; Brazil Kelly Deguchi; Canada
Half-middleweight (63 kg)	Ketleyn Quadros; Brazil	Prisca Awiti; Mexico	Alisha Galles; United States Estefania García; Ecuador
Middleweight (70 kg)	Ellen Santana; Brazil	Celinda Corozo; Ecuador	Chantal Wright; United States
Half-heavyweight (78 kg)	Vanessa Chalá; Ecuador	Kaliema Antomarchi; Cuba	Karen León; Venezuela Nefeli Papadakis; United States
Heavyweight (+78 kg)	Beatriz Souza; Brazil	Nina Cutro-Kelly; United States	Priscila Martínez; Mexico Melissa Mojica; Puerto Rico
