= Orlando Polanco =

Cuban judoka (born 1999)

Personal information
- Born: 1 January 1999 (age 27)
- Occupation: Judoka

Sport
- Country: Cuba
- Sport: Judo
- Weight class: ‍–‍66 kg

Achievements and titles
- World Champ.: 5th (2025)
- Pan American Champ.: (2026)
Medal record
Men's judo
Representing Cuba
Pan American Games
Silver medal – second place	2023 Santiago	Mixed team
Bronze medal – third place	2023 Santiago	‍–‍66 kg
Pan American Championships
Gold medal – first place	2026 Panama City	‍–‍66 kg
Silver medal – second place	2021 Guadalajara	‍–‍66 kg
Silver medal – second place	2023 Calgary	‍–‍66 kg
Bronze medal – third place	2019 Lima	‍–‍66 kg
Bronze medal – third place	2020 Guadalajara	‍–‍66 kg
Central American and Caribbean Games
Gold medal – first place	2023 San Salvador	‍–‍66 kg
Gold medal – first place	2023 San Salvador	Mixed team
Gold medal – first place	2026 Santo Domingo	‍–‍66 kg
IJF Grand Slam
Bronze medal – third place	2019 Abu Dhabi	‍–‍66 kg

Profile at external databases
- IJF: 48724
- JudoInside.com: 118291
- Updated on 25 July 2026

Orlando Polanco (born 1 January 1999) is a Cuban judoka.

Polanco is a bronze medalist from the 2019 Judo Grand Slam Abu Dhabi in the ‍–‍66 kg category.
