= Judo at the 2019 Pan American Games – Women's +78 kg =

Women's +78 kg at the 2019 Pan American Games
- Venue: Polideportivo 3
- Dates: August 11
- Competitors: 10 from 10 nations

Medalists
Gold medal	Idalys Ortiz	Cuba
Silver medal	Melissa Mojica	Puerto Rico
Bronze medal	Beatriz Souza	Brazil
Bronze medal	Yuliana Bolivar	Peru

The women's +78 kg competition of the judo events at the 2019 Pan American Games in Lima, Peru, was held on August 11 at the Polideportivo 3.

== Results ==
All times are local (UTC−5)

=== Bracket ===
Round of 16
Gabriella Wood (TTO)	11
Sasha Ingraham (BAH)	00
Laura Castillo (COL)	00S2
Yuliana Bolivar (PER)	10

Quarter Finals
Idalys Ortiz (CUB)	10
Gabriella Wood (TTO)	00
Nina Cutro-Kelly (USA)	10S1
Izayana Marenco (NCA)	00S3
Melissa Mojica (PUR)	11
Yuliana Bolivar (PER)	00S1
Beatriz Souza (BRA)	10
Priscila Martínez (MEX)	00

Semi Finals
Idalys Ortiz (CUB)	10
Nina Cutro-Kelly (USA)	00
Melissa Mojica (PUR)	01S2
Beatriz Souza (BRA)	00S1

Final
Idalys Ortiz (CUB)	10S1
Melissa Mojica (PUR)	00S3

=== Repechage round ===
Two bronze medals were awarded.

Repechage		Bronze medal
Gabriella Wood (TTO)	00
Izayana Marenco (NCA)	10	Izayana Marenco (NCA)	00S2
		Beatriz Souza (BRA)	10

Repechage		Bronze medal
Yuliana Bolivar (PER)	10S1
Priscila Martínez (MEX)	00S3	Yuliana Bolivar (PER)	10
		Nina Cutro-Kelly (USA)	00S3
