= Judo at the 2026 Central American and Caribbean Games =

- Venue: Centro Olímpico Juan Pablo Duarte
- Location: Santo Domingo, Dominican Republic
- Dates: 25 – 28 July

The judo competition at the 2026 Central American and Caribbean Games was held in Santo Domingo, Dominican Republic, from 25 to 28 July 2026 at the Centro Olímpico Juan Pablo Duarte.

== Participating nations ==
A total of 14 nations qualified athletes. The number of athletes a nation entered is in parentheses beside the name of the country.

- Bahamas (2)
- Colombia (11)
- Costa Rica (4)
- Cuba (14)
- Dominican Republic (14)
- El Salvador (8)
- Guadeloupe (1)
- Guatemala (8)
- Honduras (5)
- Mexico (13)
- Nicaragua (3)
- Panama (10)
- Puerto Rico (6)
- Venezuela (13)

== Medal table ==
* Host nation (Dominican Republic)

Rank	Nation	Gold	Silver	Bronze	Total
1	Cuba (CUB)	6	0	5	11
2	Dominican Republic (DOM)*	3	2	7	12
3	Venezuela (VEN)	3	1	7	11
4	Colombia (COL)	1	3	3	7
5	Puerto Rico (PUR)	1	3	0	4
6	Panama (PAN)	1	0	1	2
7	Mexico (MEX)	0	5	5	10
8	El Salvador (ESA)	0	1	1	2
9	Guatemala (GUA)	0	0	1	1
Totals (9 entries)		15	15	30	60

== Medal summary ==
=== Men's events ===
Event	Gold	Silver	Bronze
−60 kg	Jonathan Charon; Cuba	Jairo Moreno; El Salvador	Diego García; Dominican Republic José Ramos; Guatemala
−66 kg	Orlando Polanco; Cuba	Robin Jara; Mexico	Diego Calix; El Salvador Willis García; Venezuela
−73 kg	Marlon Herrera; Cuba	Ulises Méndez; Mexico	Maikor Louis; Dominican Republic Ferney Ruiz; Colombia
−81 kg	Adrián Gandía; Puerto Rico	Gilberto Cardoso; Mexico	Luis Pariche; Venezuela John Pérez; Colombia
−90 kg	Robert Florentino; Dominican Republic	Derik Rodríguez; Puerto Rico	Diego Díaz; Mexico Jonhelius Patete; Venezuela
−100 kg	Iván Felipe Silva Morales; Cuba	Francisco Balanta; Colombia	Alexis Esquivel; Mexico Samuel Corzo; Venezuela
+100 kg	Andy Granda; Cuba	José Nova; Dominican Republic	Luis Amezquita; Venezuela Sergio del Sol; Mexico

=== Women's events ===
Event	Gold	Silver	Bronze
−48 kg	Némesis Candelo; Panama	Estefanía Soriano; Dominican Republic	Gabriela Miranda; Venezuela Erika Lasso; Colombia
−52 kg	Dali Sentmanat; Cuba	Francine Echevarría; Puerto Rico	Paulina Martínez; Mexico Samantha Josefa; Dominican Republic
−57 kg	Ana Rosa García; Dominican Republic	María Villalba; Colombia	Audreys Pacheco; Venezuela Kristine Jiménez; Panama
−63 kg	Anriquelis Barrios; Venezuela	Prisca Awiti Alcaraz; Mexico	Creymarlin Valdez; Dominican Republic Maylín del Toro; Cuba
−70 kg	Esmeralda Damiano; Dominican Republic	Eliana Aguiar; Venezuela	Anisleidys López; Cuba Karia Castillo; Mexico
−78 kg	Brenda Olaya; Colombia	Sairy Colón; Puerto Rico	Eiraima Silvestre; Dominican Republic Lianet Cardona; Cuba
+78 kg	Karen León; Venezuela	Brigitte Carabalí; Colombia	Moira Morillo; Dominican Republic Dayanara Curbelo; Cuba

=== Mixed events ===
Event	Gold	Silver	Bronze
Team	Venezuela (VEN); Luis Pariche; Anriquelis Barrios; Samuel Corzo; Willis García; Andrés Pariche; Karen León; Audreys Pacheco; Zunilda Chávez; Jonhelius Patete	Mexico (MEX); Liliana Cárdenas; Naomi Pozo; Ulises Méndez; Alexis Esquivel; Diego Díaz; Paulina Martínez; Prisca Awiti Alcaraz	Cuba (CUB); Andy Granda; Lian Benavides; Naysdel Cardoso; Lianet Cardona; Maylín del Toro; Anisleidys Ur López; Iván Felipe Silva Morales; Dayanara Curbelo; Marlon Herrera Dominican Republic (DOM); Robert Florentino; Ana Rosa García; Esmeralda Damiano; José Nova; Maikor Louis; Moira Morillo; Medickson del Orbe
