= Judo at the 2019 Pan American Games – Men's 90 kg =

Men's 90 kg at the 2019 Pan American Games
- Venue: Polideportivo 3
- Dates: August 10
- Competitors: 10 from 10 nations

Medalists
Gold medal	Iván Felipe Silva	Cuba
Silver medal	Francisco Balanta	Colombia
Bronze medal	Mohab Elnahas	Canada
Bronze medal	Yuta Galarreta	Peru

The men's 90 kg competition of the judo events at the 2019 Pan American Games in Lima, Peru, was held on August 10 at the Polideportivo 3.

== Results ==
All times are local (UTC−5)

=== Bracket ===
Round of 16
Antony Peña (VEN)	10
José Luis Ortega (PAN)	00S1
Yuta Galarreta (PER)	01S1
Víctor Ochoa (MEX)	00S2

Quarter Finals
Iván Felipe Silva (CUB)	10
Antony Peña (VEN)	00S1
Rafael Macedo (BRA)	10
Mohab Elnahas (CAN)	00
Robert Florentino (DOM)	10
Yuta Galarreta (PER)	00S3
Francisco Balanta (COL)	10
Tomás Spikermann (ARG)	00S3

Semi Finals
Iván Felipe Silva (CUB)	10S1
Rafael Macedo (BRA)	00S3
Robert Florentino (DOM)	00
Francisco Balanta (COL)	10S2

Final
Iván Felipe Silva (CUB)	10
Francisco Balanta (COL)	00

=== Repechage round ===
Two bronze medals were awarded.

Repechage		Bronze medal
Antony Peña (VEN)	00H
Mohab Elnahas (CAN)	10	Mohab Elnahas (CAN)	10
		Robert Florentino (DOM)	00

Repechage		Bronze medal
Yuta Galarreta (PER)	10
Tomás Spikermann (ARG)	00S1	Yuta Galarreta (PER)	11
		Rafael Macedo (BRA)	00S1
