= Francisco Balanta =

Colombian judoka (born 1998)

Personal information
- Born: 16 March 1998 (age 28)
- Occupation: Judoka

Sport
- Country: Colombia
- Sport: Judo
- Weight class: ‍–‍100 kg

Achievements and titles
- World Champ.: R16 (2023, 2024)
- Pan American Champ.: (2021, 2025, 2026)
Medal record
Men's judo
Representing Colombia
Pan American Games
Silver medal – second place	2019 Lima	‍–‍90 kg
Bronze medal – third place	2023 Santiago	‍–‍100 kg
Bronze medal – third place	2023 Santiago	Mixed team
Pan American Championships
Bronze medal – third place	2021 Guadalajara	‍–‍90 kg
Bronze medal – third place	2025 Santiago	‍–‍100 kg
Bronze medal – third place	2026 Panama City	‍–‍100 kg
Central American and Caribbean Games
Gold medal – first place	2023 San Salvador	‍–‍100 kg
Silver medal – second place	2026 Santo Domingo	‍–‍100 kg
Bronze medal – third place	2018 Barranquilla	‍–‍90 kg
Bronze medal – third place	2023 San Salvador	Mixed team
South American Games
Bronze medal – third place	2018 Cochabamba	‍–‍90 kg
Bolivarian Games
Gold medal – first place	2017 Santa Marta	Team
Gold medal – first place	2025 Lima-Ayacucho	‍–‍100 kg
Silver medal – second place	2025 Lima-Ayacucho	Mixed team
Bronze medal – third place	2017 Santa Marta	‍–‍90 kg
Pan American Junior Championships
Gold medal – first place	2018 La Paz	‍–‍90 kg
Silver medal – second place	2017 Cancún	‍–‍90 kg
Bronze medal – third place	2016 Cordoba	‍–‍90 kg
South American Junior Championships
Bronze medal – third place	2015 Lima	‍–‍81 kg

Profile at external databases
- IJF: 26040
- JudoInside.com: 98853
- Updated on 23 April 2026

Francisco Balanta (born 16 March 1998) is a Colombian judoka. He won the silver medal in the ‍–‍90 kg event at the 2019 Pan American Games held in Lima, Peru.

At the 2018 South American Games held in Cochabamba, Bolivia, Balanta won one of the bronze medals in the ‍–‍90 kg event. Later that year, he also won one of the bronze medals in the ‍–‍90 kg event at the 2018 Central American and Caribbean Games held in Barranquilla, Colombia.

In 2019, Balanta competed in the ‍–‍90 kg event at the World Judo Championships held in Tokyo, Japan where he was eliminated in his first match by Abderrahmane Benamadi of Algeria.

== Achievements ==
Year	Tournament	Place	Weight class
Representing Colombia
2017	Bolivarian Games	1st	Team
2017	Bolivarian Games	3rd	–90 kg
2018	South American Games	3rd	–90 kg
2018	Central American and Caribbean Games	3rd	–90 kg
2019	Pan American Games	2nd	–90 kg
2021	Pan American Championships	3rd	–90 kg
2023	Central American and Caribbean Games	1st	–100 kg
2023	Central American and Caribbean Games	3rd	Mixed team
2023	Pan American Games	3rd	–100 kg
2023	Pan American Games	3rd	Mixed team
2025	Pan American Championships	3rd	–100 kg
2025	Bolivarian Games	1st	–100 kg
2025	Bolivarian Games	2nd	Mixed team
2026	Pan American Championships	3rd	–100 kg
2026	Central American and Caribbean Games	2nd	–100 kg
