= Yuta Galarreta =

Peruvian judoka (born 1997)

Personal information
- Full name: Roberto Yuta Galarreta Villar
- Born: 10 December 1997 (age 28)
- Occupation: Judoka

Sport
- Country: Peru
- Sport: Judo
- Weight class: ‍–‍90 kg

Achievements and titles
- World Champ.: R32 (2021, 2023)
- Pan American Champ.: (2021)
Medal record
Men's judo
Representing Peru
Pan American Games
Bronze medal – third place	2019 Lima	‍–‍90 kg
Pan American Championships
Bronze medal – third place	2021 Guadalajara	‍–‍90 kg
South American Games
Gold medal – first place	2018 Cochabamba	‍–‍90 kg
Pan American Junior Championships
Bronze medal – third place	2016 Cordoba	‍–‍81 kg
Bronze medal – third place	2017 Cancún	‍–‍90 kg
South American Junior Championships
Gold medal – first place	2015 Lima	‍–‍81 kg

Profile at external databases
- IJF: 15374
- JudoInside.com: 16289
- Updated on 11 May 2023

Roberto Yuta Galarreta Villar (born 10 December 1997) is a Peruvian judoka. He won one of the bronze medals in the men's 90 kg event at the 2019 Pan American Games held in Lima, Peru. In his bronze medal match he defeated Rafael Macedo of Brazil.

== Achievements ==
Year	Tournament	Place	Weight class
2018	South American Games	1st	90 kg
2019	Pan American Games	3rd	90 kg
2021	Pan American Championships	3rd	90 kg
