= Ana Rosa García =

Dominican judoka (born 1997)

Personal information
- Born: 2 December 1997 (age 28)
- Occupation: Judoka

Sport
- Country: Dominican Republic
- Sport: Judo
- Weight class: ‍–‍57 kg

Achievements and titles
- World Champ.: R32 (2017, 2022)
- Pan American Champ.: (2019, 2024, 2026)
Medal record
Women's judo
Representing Dominican Republic
Pan American Games
Gold medal – first place	2019 Lima	‍–‍57 kg
Bronze medal – third place	2023 Santiago	Mixed team
Pan American Championships
Bronze medal – third place	2019 Lima	‍–‍57 kg
Bronze medal – third place	2024 Rio de Janeiro	‍–‍57 kg
Bronze medal – third place	2026 Panama City	‍–‍57 kg
Central American and Caribbean Games
Gold medal – first place	2026 Santo Domingo	‍–‍57 kg

Profile at external databases
- IJF: 13597
- JudoInside.com: 22499
- Updated on 25 July 2026

Ana Smerlyn Rosa García (born on 2 December 1997) is a judoka from the Dominican Republic. She has competed in several international judo tournaments, most notably the 2019 Pan American Games in Lima, Peru, where she won the gold medal in the 57 kg division.

== Pan American Games ==
García represented her native Dominican Republic at the 2019 Pan American Games held in Lima, Peru. She advanced to her division's finals but originally lost to Brazilian competitor Rafaela Silva; Silva was, however, later found to have used fenoterol, an anabolic, during the competition and was disqualified by Pan Am Sports, the Pan Am Games' organizing association, and the gold medal was therefore transferred to García.

García joined Estefania Soriano and Wander Mateo as judo gold medalists from the Dominican Republic at the Pan American Games competition level.
