= Ellen Santana =

Brazilian judoka (born 1998)

Personal information
- Born: 13 May 1998 (age 28)
- Occupation: Judoka

Sport
- Country: Brazil
- Sport: Judo
- Weight class: ‍–‍70 kg

Achievements and titles
- Pan American Champ.: (gold) (2021)
Medal record
Women's judo
Representing Brazil
World Championships
Bronze medal – third place	2019 Tokyo	Mixed team
Pan American Championships
Gold medal – first place	2021 Guadalajara	‍–‍70 kg
IJF Grand Slam
Bronze medal – third place	2019 Düsseldorf	‍–‍70 kg
Bronze medal – third place	2023 Paris	‍–‍70 kg
Pan American Junior Championships
Gold medal – first place	2017 Cancún	‍–‍70 kg
Gold medal – first place	2018 La Paz	‍–‍70 kg

Profile at external databases
- IJF: 33902
- JudoInside.com: 106579
- Updated on 6 February 2023

Ellen Santana (born 13 May 1998) is a Brazilian judoka.

Santana won a medal at the 2019 World Judo Championships.
