= Yuliana Bolívar =

Peruvian judoka (born 1990)

Personal information
- Full name: Yuliana Vanessa Bolívar Gonzáles
- Born: 18 May 1990 (age 36)
- Occupation: Judoka

Sport
- Country: Peru
- Sport: Judo
- Weight class: +78 kg

Achievements and titles
- World Champ.: R32 (2021)
- Pan American Champ.: (2022)
Medal record
Women's judo
Representing Peru
Pan American Games
Bronze medal – third place	2019 Lima	+78 kg
Pan American Championships
Silver medal – second place	2022 Lima	+78 kg
Bronze medal – third place	2020 Guadalajara	+78 kg

Profile at external databases
- IJF: 44436
- JudoInside.com: 43857
- Updated on 3 July 2022

Yuliana Vanessa Bolívar Gonzáles (born 18 May 1990) is a Peruvian judoka. She won one of the bronze medals in the women's +78 kg event at the 2019 Pan American Games held in Lima, Peru. In her bronze medal match she defeated Nina Cutro-Kelly of the United States. She is originally from Venezuela.

In 2020, she won the bronze medal in the women's +78 kg event at the Pan American Judo Championships held in Guadalajara, Mexico. In 2021, she competed in the women's +78 kg event at the World Judo Championships held in Budapest, Hungary.

== Achievements ==
Year	Tournament	Place	Weight class
2019	Pan American Games	3rd	+78 kg
2020	Pan American Judo Championships	3rd	+78 kg
2022	Pan American Judo Championships	2nd	+78 kg
