= Kristine Jiménez =

Panamanian judoka (born 1995)

Personal information
- Nationality: Panamanian
- Born: 19 September 1995 (age 30)
- Occupation: Judoka

Sport
- Country: Panama
- Sport: Judo
- Weight class: ‍–‍52 kg, ‍–‍57 kg

Achievements and titles
- Olympic Games: R16 (2024)
- World Champ.: R16 (2024)
- Pan American Champ.: (2021)
Medal record
Women's judo
Representing Panama
Pan American Games
Bronze medal – third place	2019 Lima	‍–‍52 kg
Bronze medal – third place	2023 Santiago	‍–‍57 kg
Pan American Championships
Bronze medal – third place	2021 Guadalajara	‍–‍52 kg
Central American and Caribbean Games
Gold medal – first place	2018 Barranquilla	‍–‍52 kg
Bronze medal – third place	2026 Santo Domingo	‍–‍57 kg
Bolivarian Games
Bronze medal – third place	2013 Trujillo	‍–‍52 kg

Profile at external databases
- IJF: 17233
- JudoInside.com: 22865
- Updated on 25 July 2026

Kristine Jiménez (born 19 September 1995) is a Panamanian judoka who competes in the women's 52 kg category. She competed at the 2017 Judo Grand Prix Cancún and the 2021 World Judo Championships.

Jiménez qualified for the 2020 Summer Olympics.
