= Alfredo Villegas Arreola =

Mexican politician

- Born: 12 January 1951 (age 75); Sinaloa, Mexico
- Occupation: Politician
- Political party: PRI

Alfredo Villegas Arreola (born 12 January 1951) is a Mexican politician affiliated with the Institutional Revolutionary Party (PRI).

He has served in the Chamber of Deputies during the 55th (DF's 24th district), 57th (Sinaloa's 3rd), 59th (plurinominal, 1st region), and 61st (plurinominal, 1st region) sessions of Congress.
