= Chantal Wright =

American judoka (born 1993)

Personal information
- Born: February 1, 1993 (age 33)
- Occupation: Judoka

Sport
- Country: United States
- Sport: Judo
- Weight class: –70 kg

Achievements and titles
- World Champ.: R32 (2018, 2021)
- Pan American Champ.: (2020, 2021)
Medal record
Women's judo
Representing United States
Pan American Championships
Bronze medal – third place	2020 Guadalajara	–70 kg
Bronze medal – third place	2021 Guadalajara	–70 kg

Profile at external databases
- IJF: 17862
- JudoInside.com: 61955
- Updated on 11 May 2023

Chantal Wright (born February 1, 1993) is an American judoka, though she has previously competed for both Switzerland and the United Kingdom.

She won the 70 kg categories at the 2016 Pan American Open in San Salvador and the 2017 Pan American Open in Buenos Aires, and came second at the 2018 Pan American Open in Santo Domingo.

Wright won bronze at both the 2020 and the 2021 Pan American Judo Championships. She also competed at the 2021 World Judo Championships in the 70kg category, but was knocked out by Dutch judoka Sanne van Dijke.

== Personal life ==
Wright's two younger siblings, Kyle and Liam, also compete in judo competitions; all three are trained by their father.

Throughout the COVID-19 pandemic, Wright worked as an intensive care nurse.
