= Wander Mateo =

Dominican judoka (born 1989)

Personal information
- Nationality: Dominican
- Born: 24 December 1989 (age 36)
- Occupation: Judoka

Sport
- Sport: Judo
Medal record
Representing Dominican Republic
Pan American Games
Gold medal – first place	2019 Lima	–66 kg
Pan American Championships
Silver medal – second place	2015 Edmonton	–66 kg
Bronze medal – third place	2014 Guayaquil	–66 kg
Bronze medal – third place	2021 Guadalajara	–66 kg

Profile at external databases
- IJF: 2630
- JudoInside.com: 54099
- Updated on 3 November 2021

Wander Mateo (born 24 December 1989) is a Dominican judoka.

He participated at the 2016 Summer Olympics in Rio de Janeiro, in the men's 66 kg competition.
