= Serrano (surname) =

Serrano is a surname common in the Spanish, Portuguese, and Italian languages.

== Notable people ==
- Amanda Serrano (born 1988), Puerto Rican boxer
- Ana Serrano, artist
- Ana Serrano Redonnet (1910s—1993), Argentine composer
- Andres Serrano (born 1950), American photographer
- Antonio Serrano (born 1955), Mexican film writer-director
- Antonio Serrano (born 1965), Spanish long-distance runner
- Antonio Serrano (born 1979), Peruvian football striker
- Bartolomé Serrano (born 1969), Spanish long-distance runner
- Boni Serrano (1922–1970), Filipino veteran of the Korean War
- Carla Heredia Serrano (born 1991), Ecuadorian chess player
- Cindy Serrano (born 1983), Puerto Rican boxer
- Danny Vargas Serrano (born 1979), member of the Legislative Assembly of Costa Rica
- Dave Serrano (born 1964), American college baseball coach
- David Serrano Sobral (born 1986), Portuguese astrophysicist
- Eduardo Serrano (musician) (1911–2008), Venezuelan musician
- Eduardo Serrano (actor) (1942–2025), Venezuelan actor
- Elba Serrano, Puerto Rican neuroscientist
- Emilia Serrano de Wilson (ca. 1834–1923), Spanish writer, journalist, feminist, traveler
- Encho Serrano (born 1999), Filipino basketball player
- Eva Serrano (born 1978), French gymnast
- Felix Serrano, American comic book artist
- Francho Serrano (born 2001), Spanish footballer
- Francisco J. Serrano (1900–1982), Mexican civil engineer and architect
- Francisco Serrano y Domínguez, Duke de la Torre (1810–1885), Spanish marshal and statesman
- Irma Serrano (1933–2023), Mexican actress
- Ismael Serrano (born 1974), Spanish Singer/Songwriter
- J. Francisco Serrano Cacho (born 1937), Mexican architect
- Jorge Serrano Elías (born 1945), President of Guatemala
- José Enrique Serrano (born 1943), Democrat, U.S. House of Representatives
- José Enrique Serrano Martínez (1949–2025), Spanish politician
- José Serrano (composer) (1873–1941), Spanish composer of zarzuelas
- José António Serrano (1851–1904), Portuguese physician
- José Manuel Serrano, Spanish footballer
- José Mariano Serrano (1788–c. 1853), Bolivian member of the Congress of Tucumán
- Joseph Serrano (born 1984), Puerto Rican boxer
- Juan Serrano, sixteenth-century Portuguese navigator
- Juan Serrano (Flamenco), Spanish flamenco guitarist
- Juan René Serrano (born 1984), Mexican archer
- Julian Serrano (born 1993), Spanish-American chef
- María Isabel Prieto Serrano (born 1973), Spanish politician
- Marta Serrano (born 2003), Spanish long-distance runner and a steeplechaser
- Mary J. Serrano (c. 1840–1923), a writer, poet and translator
- Miguel Serrano (1917–2009), Chilean diplomat and writer
- Nestor Serrano (born 1955), American actor
- Nina Serrano, American poet and storyteller
- Paula Serrano (born 1991), Spanish footballer
- Pedro Serrano (police officer), New York City police officer
- Pedro Serrano (sailor), sixteenth-century Spanish sailor
- Ramón Serrano Súñer (1901–2003), Spanish politician
- Roberto Serrano (born 1964), American economist
- Rolando Serrano (1938–2022), Colombian footballer
- Rosana Serrano (born 1998), Cuban rower
- Sebastià Serrano, Spanish linguist and author
- Susana Serrano-Gazteluurrutia (born 1969), Basque lawyer, legal scholar, professor of law

== Fictional characters ==
- Heris Serrano, the central character in the Familias Regnant books
- Inèz Serrano, one of the characters in the existentialist French play No Exit by Jean-Paul Sartre.

== See also ==
- Serano
