= Antonio Serrano =

Antonio Serrano may refer to:

- Antonio Serrano (director) (born 1955), Mexican director, actor and writer
- Antonio Serrano (runner) (born 1965), Spanish marathon runner
- Antonio Serrano (footballer) (born 1979), Peruvian footballer
- Marcos-Antonio Serrano (born 1972), Spanish cyclist

== See also ==
- Serrano (surname), a Romance-language surname
