= Cuba at the 2019 Pan American Games =

- IOC code: CUB
- NOC: Cuban Olympic Committee

in Lima, Peru 26 July–11 August, 2019
- Competitors: 420 in 11 sports
- Flag bearer: Mijaín López (opening)
- Medals Ranked 6th: Gold 33 Silver 27 Bronze 38 Total 98

Pan American Games appearances (overview)
- 1951; 1955; 1959; 1963; 1967; 1971; 1975; 1979; 1983; 1987; 1991; 1995; 1999; 2003; 2007; 2011; 2015; 2019; 2023

Cuba competed in the 2019 Pan American Games in Lima, Peru from July 26 to August 11, 2019.

On July 6, 2019, wrestler Mijaín López was named as the country's flag bearer during the opening ceremony.

The Cuban team consisted of 420 athletes. With 33 gold medals, Cuba finished in the 6th place of the medal table, whice represent the lowest position for a Cuban delegation in Pan American Games since 1959 in which finished 8th.

== Medalists ==
The following Cuban competitors won medals at the games.

Medal	Name	Sport	Event	Date
Gold	Serguey Torres; Fernando Jorge	Canoeing	Men's C-2 1000 metres	July 27
Gold	Laina Pérez	Shooting	Women's 10 metre air pistol	July 27
Gold	Jorge Grau	Shooting	Men's 10 metre air pistol	July 28
Gold	Laina Pérez; Jorge Grau	Shooting	Mixed pairs air pistol	July 28
Gold	Mayvihanet Borges; Katherin Nuevo	Canoeing	Women's K-2 500 metres	July 29
Gold	Lázaro Álvarez	Boxing	Men's 60 kg	July 30
Gold	Roniel Iglesias	Boxing	Men's 69 kg	July 30
Gold	Arlen López	Boxing	Men's 75 kg	July 30
Gold	Erislandy Savón	Boxing	Men's 91 kg	July 30
Gold	Dainier Pero	Boxing	Men's +91 kg	July 30
Gold	Julio César La Cruz	Boxing	Men's 81 kg	August 1
Gold	Osvel Caballero	Boxing	Men's 56 kg	August 2
Gold	Andy Cruz	Boxing	Men's 64 kg	August 2
Gold	Ismael Borrero	Wrestling	Men's Greco-Roman 67 kg	August 7
Gold	Gabriel Rosillo	Wrestling	Men's Greco-Roman 97 kg	August 7
Gold	Aimee Hernández; Yariulvis Cobas	Rowing	Women's double sculls	August 8
Gold	Mijaín López	Wrestling	Men's Greco-Roman 130 kg	August 8
Gold	Alejandro Valdés	Wrestling	Men's Freestyle 65 kg	August 9
Gold	Ángel Fournier	Rowing	Men's single sculls	August 10
Gold	Yurieski Torreblanca	Wrestling	Men's Freestyle 86 kg	August 10
Silver	Reinier Carrera; Renier Mora; Robert Benítez; Fidel Antonio Vargas	Canoeing	Men's K-4 500 metres	July 28
Silver	Eglys De La Cruz	Shooting	Women's 50 metre rifle three positions	July 28
Silver	Fernando Jorge	Canoeing	Men's C-1 1000 metres	July 29
Silver	Elani Camara Rodriguez; Leydi Moya	Modern pentathlon	Women's relay	July 29
Silver	Rafael Alba	Taekwondo	Men's +80 kg	July 29
Silver	Yosvany Veitía	Boxing	Men's 52 kg	July 30
Silver	Yesenia Ferrera	Gymnastics	Women's vault	July 30
Silver	Boris Guerra; Adrián Oquendo	Rowing	Men's double sculls	August 8
Silver	Eduardo González; Carlos Ajete; Reidy Cardona; Jesús Rodríguez	Rowing	Men's coxless four	August 8
Silver	Yusneylys Guzmán	Wrestling	Women's Freestyle 50 kg	August 8
Silver	Jorge Patterson; Reidy Cardona; Boris Guerra; Adrian Oquendo	Rowing	Men's quadruple sculls	August 9
Silver	Rayma Ortíz; Aimee Hernández; Yariulvis Cobas; Marelis González	Rowing	Women's quadruple sculls	August 10
Silver	Óscar Pino	Wrestling	Men's Freestyle 125 kg	August 10
Bronze	Leydi Moya	Modern pentathlon	Women's 10 metre air pistol	July 27
Bronze	Sheyla González	Shooting	Women's individual	July 27
Bronze	José Cobas	Taekwondo	Men's 80 kg	July 29
Bronze	Arlettys Acosta	Taekwondo	Women's 67 kg	July 29
Bronze	Niurkis Mora; Liliamnis Rosabal; Schakira Robert; Arisleidy Márquez; Lizandra Lusson; Gleinys Reyes; Yunisleidy Camejo; Indiana Cedeño; Lorena Téllez; Eyatne Rizo; Nahomi Márquez; Yennifer Toledo; Yarumy Céspedes; Rosa Leal	Handball	Women's tournament	July 30
Bronze	Alejandro de la Cruz	Gymnastics	Men's vault	July 31
Bronze	Huber Godoy	Gymnastics	Men's horizontal bar	July 31
Bronze	Damián Arce	Boxing	Men's 49 kg	July 31
Bronze	Osleni Guerrero; Leodannis Martínez	Badminton	Men's doubles	August 2
Bronze	Claudia Arjona; Melissa Kindelán; Tatiana Frometa; Elaine Rojas; Danay Utria	Gymnastics	Women's rhythmic group 3 hoops + 2 clubs	August 5
Bronze	Luis Orta	Wrestling	Men's Greco-Roman 60 kg	August 7
Bronze	Yosvanys Peña	Wrestling	Men's Greco-Roman 77 kg	August 7
Bronze	Daniel Grégorich	Wrestling	Men's Greco-Roman 77 kg	August 7
Bronze	Lianna Montero	Wrestling	Women's Freestyle 53 kg	August 8
Bronze	Rosana Serrano; Milena Venega	Rowing	Women's lightweight double sculls	August 9
Bronze	Yudaris Sánchez	Wrestling	Women's Freestyle 68 kg	August 9
Bronze	Mabelkis Capote	Wrestling	Women's Freestyle 76 kg	August 9
Bronze	Reineri Andreu	Wrestling	Men's Freestyle 57 kg	August 9
Bronze	Ennier Tamayo; Yhoan Uribarri; Alexei Carballosa; Osvaldo Pérez	Rowing	Men's lightweight coxless four	August 10
Bronze	Milena Venega	Rowing	Women's lightweight single sculls	August 10
Bronze	Boris Guerra; Yoelvis Hernández; Eduardo González; Jorge Patterson; Carlos Ajete; Reidy Cardona; Adrian Oquendo; Jesús Rodríguez; Yadian Rodríguez	Rowing	Men's eight	August 10
Bronze	Geandry Garzón	Wrestling	Men's Freestyle 74 kg	August 10
Bronze	Reineris Salas	Wrestling	Men's Freestyle 97 kg	August 10

Medals by sport
Sport	1st place, gold medalist(s)	2nd place, silver medalist(s)	3rd place, bronze medalist(s)	Total
Shooting	8	1	1	10
Wrestling	5	2	9	16
Shooting	3	1	1	5
Rowing	2	4	4	10
Canoeing	2	2	0	4
Gymnastics	0	1	3	4
Taekwondo	0	1	2	3
Modern pentathlon	0	1	1	2
Badminton	0	0	1	1
Total	20	13	22	55

Medals by day
Day	Date	1st place, gold medalist(s)	2nd place, silver medalist(s)	3rd place, bronze medalist(s)	Total
1	July 27	2	0	2	4
2	July 28	2	2	0	4
3	July 29	1	3	2	6
4	July 30	5	2	0	7
5	July 31	0	0	2	2
6	August 1	1	0	0	1
7	August 2	2	0	2	4
8	August 3	0	0	0	0
9	August 4	0	0	0	0
10	August 5	0	0	1	1
Total		20	13	22	55

Medals by gender
Gender	1st place, gold medalist(s)	2nd place, silver medalist(s)	3rd place, bronze medalist(s)	Total
Female	3	5	9	17
Male	16	8	13	37
Mixed	1	0	0	1
Total	20	13	22	55

Multiple medalists
Name	Sport	1st place, gold medalist(s)	2nd place, silver medalist(s)	3rd place, bronze medalist(s)	Total
Laina Pérez	Shooting	2	0	0	2
Jorge Grau	Shooting	2	0	0	2
Fernando Jorge	Canoeing	1	1	0	2
Leydi Moya	Modern pentathlon	0	1	1	2

== Competitors ==
The following is the list of number of competitors (per gender) participating at the games per sport/discipline.

Sport	Men	Women	Total
Archery	3	3	6
Badminton	3	3	6
Baseball	24	0	24
Basque pelota	4	6	10
Boxing	10	0	10
Canoeing	6	6	12
Cycling	5	7	12
Diving	5	3	8
Fencing	7	7	14
Field hockey	16	16	32
Handball	14	14	28
Judo	7	7	14
Karate	1	2	3
Modern pentathlon	2	3	5
Racquetball	2	2	4
Roller sports	1	2	3
Rowing	15	7	22
Sailing	4	3	7
Shooting	8	4	12
Softball	15	0	15
Table tennis	3	3	6
Taekwondo	3	4	7
Tennis	2	0	2
Volleyball	14	2	16
Water polo	11	11	22
Weightlifting	4	4	8
Wrestling	12	6	18
Total	201	125	326

== Archery ==
Men

Athlete	Event	Ranking round		Round of 32	Round of 16	Quarterfinal	Semifinal	Final / BM	
Athlete	Event	Score	Rank	Opposition Result	Opposition Result	Opposition Result	Opposition Result	Opposition Result	Rank
Adrián Puentes	Individual recurve	659	10	O'Brien (PER); W 6–0	Álvarez (MEX); W 6–4	D'Almeida (BRA); L 0–6	Did not advance		
Hugo Franco	Individual recurve	658	13	Catariz (TTO); W 7–1	Duenas (CAN); L 1–7	Did not advance			
Juan Carlos Stevens	Individual recurve	655	16	Malavé (VEN); W 6–5	Ellison (USA); L 1–7	Did not advance			
Hugo Franco; Adrián Puentes; Juan Carlos Stevens	Team recurve	1972	5	—N/a		Canada; L 2–6	Did not advance		

Women

Athlete	Event	Ranking round		Round of 32	Round of 16	Quarterfinal	Semifinal	Final / BM	
Athlete	Event	Score	Rank	Opposition Result	Opposition Result	Opposition Result	Opposition Result	Opposition Result	Rank
Elizabeth Rodríguez	Individual recurve	635	9	Rojas (CHI); L 2–6	Did not advance				
Maydenia Sarduy	Individual recurve	609	19	Cuadros (PER); W 6–2	Román (MEX); L 0–6	Did not advance			
Karla Fals	Individual recurve	582	27	Lorig (USA); L 0–6	Did not advance				
Karla Fals; Elizabeth Rodríguez; Maydenia Sarduy	Team recurve	1826	6	—N/a		Colombia; L 2–6	Did not advance		

Mixed

Athlete	Event	Ranking round		Round of 16	Quarterfinal	Semifinal	Final / BM	
Athlete	Event	Score	Rank	Opposition Result	Opposition Result	Opposition Result	Opposition Result	Rank
Adrián Puentes; Elizabeth Rodríguez	Team recurve	1294	6	Flossbach / Pellecer (GUA); W 5–1	Pineda / Rendón (COL); L 1–5	Did not advance		

== Badminton ==
Cuba qualified a team of six badminton athletes (three per gender).

Singles

Athlete	Event	Round of 64	Round of 32	Round of 16	Quarterfinals	Semifinals	Final	Rank
Athlete	Event	Opposition Result	Opposition Result	Opposition Result	Opposition Result	Opposition Result	Opposition Result	Rank
Leodannis Palacio	Men's	Bye	Thorpe (BAR); W 2–0 (21–8, 21–6)	Coelho (BRA); L 0–2 (15–21, 20–22)	Did not advance			
Roberto Herrera Vazquez	Men's	Bye	Farias (BRA); L 1–2 (16–21, 21–18, 14–21)	Did not advance				
Osleni Guerrero	Men's	Bye	Oliva (ARG); W 2–0 (21–8, 21–6)	Opti (SUR); W 2–0 (22–20, 21–9)	Yang (CAN); L 1–2 (10–21, 21–15, 13–21)	Did not advance		
Yeily Rodríguez	Women's	Sanchez (VEN); W 2–0 (21–12, 21–18)	Lima (BRA); L 0–2 (12–21, 12–21)	Did not advance				
Marianne Gonzalez Ortiz	Women's	Bye	Zambrano (ECU); L 0–2 (14–21, 13–21)	Did not advance				
Taymara Pupo	Women's	Bye	Gualdi (ARG); W 2–0 (21–5, 21–12)	Williams (BAR); W 2–0 (21–11, 21–10)	Honderich (CAN); L 2–0 (13–21, 10–21)	Did not advance		

Doubles

Athlete	Event	Round of 32	Round of 16	Quarterfinals	Semifinals	Final	Rank
Athlete	Event	Opposition Result	Opposition Result	Opposition Result	Opposition Result	Opposition Result	Rank
Osleni Guerrero; Leodannis Palacio	Men's	Bye	Cabrera / Javier (DOM); W 2–0 (21–14, 21–15)	Henry / Ricketts (JAM); W 2–0 (21–19, 21–9)	Ho-shue / Yakura (CAN); L 0–2 (21–23, 15–21)	Did not advance	3rd place, bronze medalist(s)
Taymara Pupo; Yeily Rodríguez	Women's	Bye	Richardson / Wynter (JAM); W 2–0 (21–13, 21–11)	Chen / Hsu (USA); L 0–2 (16–21, 15–21)	Did not advance		
Leodannis Palacio; Yeily Rodríguez	Mixed	Ramdhani / Ramdhani (GUY); W 2–0 (21–8, 21–14)	Farias / Lima (BRA); L 0–2 (17–21, 17–21)	Did not advance			

== Baseball ==
Cuba qualified a men's team of 24 athletes by finishing in the top four at the 2019 Pan American Games Qualifier in Brazil.

Group B

	GP	W	L	RS	RA	DIFF
Canada	3	3	0	28	9	+19
Colombia	3	2	1	13	13	0
Cuba	3	1	2	17	14	+3
Argentina	3	0	3	2	24	−22

Qualified for the Super round

July 29; 10:05	Cuba	1–6	Colombia	Baseball Stadium, Lima; Attendance: 2,456
July 29; 10:05		Boxscore		Baseball Stadium, Lima; Attendance: 2,456

July 30; 19:05	Canada	8–6	Cuba	Baseball Stadium, Lima; Attendance: 1,123
July 30; 19:05		Boxscore		Baseball Stadium, Lima; Attendance: 1,123

July 31; 15:05	Cuba	10–0 (F/7)	Argentina	Baseball Stadium, Lima; Attendance: 987
July 31; 15:05		Boxscore		Baseball Stadium, Lima; Attendance: 987

Fifth place match

August 3; 10:05	Dominican Republic	10–9 (F/10)	Cuba	Baseball Stadium, Lima; Attendance: 2,415
August 3; 10:05		Boxscore		Baseball Stadium, Lima; Attendance: 2,415

== Basque pelota ==
Men

Athlete	Event	Preliminary round					Semifinal	Final / BM	Rank
Athlete	Event	Match 1	Match 2	Match 3	Match 4	Rank	Semifinal	Final / BM	Rank
Athlete	Event	Opposition Score	Opposition Score	Opposition Score	Opposition Score	Rank	Opposition Score	Opposition Score	Rank
Alejandro González	Individual fronton rubber ball	Andreasen (ARG); L 14-15, 8-15	Segura (ESA); W 15-9, 15-4	Letelier (CHI); W 15-4, 15-5	Carrasco (PER); W 15-0, 15-4	2 Q	Rodriguez (MEX); L 5-15, 4-15	Mesa (URU); W 15-7, 15-7	3rd place, bronze medalist(s)
Alejandro González	Peruvian fronton	Martínez (PER); L 4-15, 4-15	Espinoza (USA); L 13-15, 9-15	Osorio (ARG); L 12-15, 4-15	Perez (MEX); W 15-13, 7-15, 10-6	5	—N/a	Did not advance	
Armando Chappi; Frendy Fernández	Doubles fronton leather ball	Fusto / Villegas (ARG); L 6-15, 9-15	Fernández / Velásquez (PER); W 15-2, 15-5	Ledesma / Urrutia (MEX); W 15-13, 15-6	Brugues / Huarte (USA); W 15-14, 15-7	2 Q	—N/a	Fusto / Villegas (ARG); L 6-15, 11-15	2nd place, silver medalist(s)
Dariel Leiva Nelson	Individual hand fronton	Bazo (BOL); W 10-4, 10-4	Quinto (PER); W 10-2, 10-1	—N/a		1 Q	Otheguy (BRA); W 10-4, 10-0	Álvarez (MEX); L 0-10, 0-10	2nd place, silver medalist(s)

Women

Athlete	Event	Preliminary round					Semifinal	Final / BM	Rank
Athlete	Event	Match 1	Match 2	Match 3	Match 4	Rank	Semifinal	Final / BM	Rank
Athlete	Event	Opposition Score	Opposition Score	Opposition Score	Opposition Score	Rank	Opposition Score	Opposition Score	Rank
Yisley Rodríguez; Yurisleidis Allué	Doubles trinquete rubber ball	Pinto / García (ARG); L 4-15, 2-15	Valderrama / Solas (CHI); L 15-6, 7-15, 4-10	—N/a		3	Did not advance		
Yasmary Medina; Daniela Darriba	Doubles fronton rubber ball	Bastarrica / Domínguez (CHI); W 15-1, 15-3	Andrade / Spahn (ARG); W 6-15, 15-8, 10-2	Bernal / Rodríguez (PER); W 15-2, 15-5	Figueroa / Puentes (MEX); L 13-15, 3-15	1 Q	—N/a	Figueroa / Puentes (MEX); L 4-15, 7-15	2nd place, silver medalist(s)
Yasmary Medina; Leyanis Castillo	Doubles frontenis	Muñoz / Bozzo (CHI); W 15-2, 15-6	Paredes / Rodríguez (PER); W 15-3, 15-11	—N/a		1 Q	Busson / Podversich (ARG); W 15-6, 15-8	Hernandez / Mora (MEX); L 0-15, 5-15	2nd place, silver medalist(s)
Wendy Durán	Peruvian fronton	C Suárez (PER); L 6–15, 10–15	D Rangel (VEN); W 15–14, 15–11	R Valderrama (CHI); W 15–5, 15–2	M Spahn (ARG); W 15–8, 15–12	2 Q	—N/a	C Suárez (PER); L 4–15, 14–15	2nd place, silver medalist(s)

== Boxing ==
Cuba qualified ten male boxers.

Men

Athlete	Event	Quarterfinal	Semifinal	Final	
Athlete	Event	Opposition Result	Opposition Result	Opposition Result	Rank
Damián Arce	–49 kg	Peña (PER); W 5–0	Collazo (PUR); L 1–4	Did not advance	3rd place, bronze medalist(s)
Yosvany Veitía	–52 kg	Landázury (COL); W 5–0	Rivera (PUR); W 5–0	Marte (DOM); L 1–4	2nd place, silver medalist(s)
Osvel Caballero	–56 kg	Ávila (COL); W 5–0	De La Cruz (DOM); W 4–1	Ragan (USA); W 5–0	1st place, gold medalist(s)
Lázaro Álvarez	–60 kg	Bye	Pezo (PER); W RSC	de los Santos (DOM); W 3–2	1st place, gold medalist(s)
Andy Cruz	–64 kg	Cedeño (DOM); W 5–0	Ryan (ANT); W 5–0	Davis (USA); W 4–1	1st place, gold medalist(s)
Roniel Iglesias	–69 kg	Brenes (NCA); W 5–0	Johnson (USA); W 4–1	Polanco (DOM); W 3–2	1st place, gold medalist(s)
Arlen López	–75 kg	Cedeno (DOM); W 4–1	Espino (NCA); W 5–0	Conceição (BRA); W 5–0	1st place, gold medalist(s)
Julio César La Cruz	–81 kg	Bye	Korbaj (VEN); W 5–0	Machado (BRA); W 5–0	1st place, gold medalist(s)
Erislandy Savón	–91 kg	Colwell (CAN); W 5–0	Teixeira (BRA); W 3–2	Castillo (ECU); W 4–1	1st place, gold medalist(s)
Dainier Pero	+91 kg	dos Santo (BRA); W 5–0	Torrez (USA); W 3–2	Salcedo (COL); W 4–1	1st place, gold medalist(s)

== Canoeing ==
=== Sprint ===
Cuba qualified a total of 12 sprint athletes (six men and six women).

Men

Athlete	Event	Heat		Semifinal		Final	
Athlete	Event	Time	Rank	Time	Rank	Time	Rank
Fernando Jorge	C-1 1000 m	4.09.311	1 QF	Bye		3:48.574	2nd place, silver medalist(s)
Serguey Torres; Fernando Jorge	C-2 1000 m	—N/a				3:32.276	1st place, gold medalist(s)
Renier Mora	K-1 200 m	38.578	4 SF	37.516	1 QF	39.799	7
Fidel Antonio Vargas	K-1 1000 m	3.38.415	2 QF	Bye		3:39.675	5
Robert Benítez; Fidel Antonio Vargas	K-2 1000 m	3:22.199	2 QF	Bye		3:27.046	8
Reinier Carrera; Renier Mora; Robert Benítez; Fidel Vargas	K-4 500 m	—N/a				1:23.039	2nd place, silver medalist(s)

Women

Athlete	Event	Heat		Semifinal		Final	
Athlete	Event	Time	Rank	Time	Rank	Time	Rank
Mayvihanet Borges	C-1 200 m	46.361	2 QF	Bye		47.641	3rd place, bronze medalist(s)
Mayvihanet Borges; Katherin Nuevo	C-2 500 m	—N/a				1:56.661	1st place, gold medalist(s)
Flavia López	K-1 200 m	4 SF	43.121	4 QF	47.744	8	
Yurisledy Muñoz	K-1 500 m	2.09.382	4 SF	2:01.661	3 QF	2:06.252	7
Yurisledy Muñoz; Flavia López	K-2 500 m	1:48.125	3 SF	1:50.183	1 QF	1:55.627	5
Camila Cuello; Flavia López; Yurisledy Muñoz; Yurielky Montesino	K-4 500 m	—N/a				1:46.638	7

Qualification legend: QF – Qualify to final; SF – Qualify to semifinal

== Cycling ==
=== Mountain biking ===
Athlete	Event	Time	Rank
Ludisneli Quesada	Women's	1:40:13	11

=== Road cycling ===
Athlete	Event	Time	Rank
Yans Carlos Pérez	Men's road race	4:08:37	13
Pedro Torres	Men's road race	4:09:26	33
Frank del Sol	Men's road race	DNF	
Arlenis Cañadilla	Women's road race	2:19:49	1st place, gold medalist(s)
Yumari Valdivieso	Women's road race	2:19:52	9
Iraida Ocasio	Women's road race	2:19:53	12
Pedro Torres	Men's time trial	48:43.29	12
Jeydy Bernal	Women's time trial	26:29.87	4
Arlenis Cañadilla	Women's time trial	26:39.87	8

=== Track cycling ===
Sprint

Athlete	Event	Qualification		Round of 16	Repechage 1	Quarterfinals	Semifinals	Final	
Athlete	Event	Time	Rank	Opposition Time	Opposition Time	Opposition Result	Opposition Result	Opposition Result	Rank
Lisandra Rodríguez	Women's	11.422	4 Q	Palmer (JAM); W 11.920	—N/a	Valles (MEX); L 11.528, W 11.701, L 11.709	—N/a	5th-8th place classification Hacohen (GUA); Walsh (CAN); Gaviria (COL); W 12.115	5

Keirin

Athlete	Event	Heats	Repechage	Final
Athlete	Event	Rank	Rank	Rank
Lisandra Rodríguez	Women's	3 R	1 FA	2nd place, silver medalist(s)

Madison

Athlete	Event	Points	Rank
Alejandro Parra; Leandro Vidueiro	Men's	2	7
Jeydy Bernal; Idaris Trujillo	Women's	-18	6

Pursuit

Athlete	Event	Qualification		Semifinals	Finals	
Athlete	Event	Time	Rank	Opposition Result	Opposition Result	Rank
Yumari Valdivieso; Iraida Ocasio; Idaris Trujillo; Jeydy Bernal	Women's team	4:51.742	6 Q	Ecuador; W 4:47.309	—N/a	6

Omnium

Athlete	Event	Scratch race		Tempo race		Elimination race		Points race		Total	
Athlete	Event	Rank	Points	Points	Rank	Rank	Points	Points	Rank	Points	Rank
Yans Carlos Pérez	Men's	6	30	24	9	7	28	3	11	85	9
Arlenis Cañadilla	Women's	11	20	32	5	5	32	56	2	140	3rd place, bronze medalist(s)

== Diving ==
Men

Athlete	Event	Preliminary		Final	
Athlete	Event	Points	Rank	Points	Rank
Laydel Domínguez	Men's 1m Springboard	286.95	12 Q	309.30	12
Angello Alcebo	Men's 1m Springboard	274.50	14	Did not advance	
Angello Alcebo	Men's 3m Springboard	374.75	12	398.50	10
Laydel Domínguez	Men's 3m Springboard	330.70	17	Did not advance	
Jeinkler Aguirre	Men's 10m Platform	387.35	9 Q	394.15	9
Yusmandy Paz	Men's 10m Platform	317.90	15	Did not advance	
Laydel Domínguez; José Quintana	Men's 3m Synchro	—N/a		367.08	5
Yusmandy Paz; Jeinkler Aguirre	Men's 10m Synchro Platform	—N/a		315.90	8

Women

Athlete	Event	Preliminary		Final	
Athlete	Event	Points	Rank	Points	Rank
Anisley García	Women's 1m Springboard	234.45	6 Q	251.65	8
Prisis Ruiz	Women's 1m Springboard	217.40	11 Q	226.35	12
Anisley García	Women's 3m Springboard	244.90	10 Q	192.90	12
Prisis Ruiz	Women's 3m Springboard	209.15	13	Did not advance	
Anisley García	Women's 10m Platform	299.90	8 Q	318.30	7
Arlenys Garcia	Women's 10m Platform	215.80	11 Q	210.75	12
Anisley García; Prisis Ruiz	Women's 3m Synchro	—N/a		238.83	5
Anisley García; Arlenys Garcia	Women's 10m Synchro Platform	—N/a		260.70	4

== Fencing ==
Cuba qualified a team of 14 fencers (seven men and seven women).

Men

Athlete	Event	Pool Round		Round of 16	Quarterfinals	Semifinals	Final / BM	
Athlete	Event	Victories	Seed	Opposition Score	Opposition Score	Opposition Score	Opposition Score	Rank
Yunior Reytor	Individual épée	4	2 Q	Bye	Blais-Belanger (CAN); W 15–10	Limardo (VEN); L 9–10	Did not advance	3rd place, bronze medalist(s)
Reynier Henrique	Individual épée	2	10 q	Blais-Belanger (CAN); L 11–15	Did not advance			
Yunior Reytor; Luis Enrique Arboine; Reynier Henrique	Team épée	—N/a			Brazil; W 45–37	Venezuela; W 43–42	Argentina; W 45–31	1st place, gold medalist(s)
Humberto Aguilera	Individual foil	4	5 q	Pádua (PUR); L 14–15	Did not advance			
Harold Rodríguez	Individual sabre	5	1 Q	Bye	Vila (COL); W 15–14	Di Tella (ARG); L 7–15	Did not advance	3rd place, bronze medalist(s)
Hansel Rodriguez	Individual sabre	3	11 q	Heredia (VEN); L 10–15	Did not advance			
Fabian Huapaya; Ángel Jave; Jet Vargas	Team sabre	—N/a			United States; L 25–45	Argentina; L 41–45	Peru; W 45–21	7

Women

Athlete	Event	Pool Round		Round of 16	Quarterfinals	Semifinals	Final / BM	
Athlete	Event	Victories	Seed	Opposition Score	Opposition Score	Opposition Score	Opposition Score	Rank
Yamirka Rodriguez	Individual épée	3	7 q	Mackinnon (CAN); W 15–14	Holmes (USA); L 12–15	Did not advance		
Seily Mendoza	Individual épée	2	11 q	Hoppe (CAN); W 15–9	Moellhausen (BRA); L 5–15	Did not advance		
Yamirka Rodriguez; Diamelys Sandoval; Seily Mendoza	Team épée	—N/a			Canada; W 45–40	Brazil; W 45–37	United States; L 29–45	2nd place, silver medalist(s)
Daylen Moreno	Individual foil	3	7 q	Acurero (VEN); L 7–15	Did not advance			
Elizabeth Hidalgo	Individual foil	1	15	Did not advance				
Daylen Moreno; Elisa Zorrilla; Elizabeth Hidalgo	Team foil	—N/a			United States; L 18–45	Argentina; W 45–19	Brazil; L 28–45	6
Aymara Tablada	Individual sabre	2	12 q	Ysabel (DOM); W 15–11	Belén (ARG); L 12–15	Did not advance		

== Field hockey ==
Cuba qualified a men's and women's team (of 16 athletes each, for a total of 32) by being ranked among the top two nations at the field hockey at the 2018 Central American and Caribbean Games tournaments.

=== Men's tournament ===
Preliminary round

Pos	Team	Pld	W	D	L	GF	GA	GD	Pts	Qualification
1	Argentina	3	3	0	0	20	1	+19	9	Quarter-finals
2	Chile	3	2	0	1	7	5	+2	6	Quarter-finals
3	Cuba	3	1	0	2	3	15	−12	3	Quarter-finals
4	Trinidad and Tobago	3	0	0	3	2	11	−9	0	Quarter-finals

Source: FIH

30 July 2019
12:00

Trinidad and Tobago	2–3	Cuba
Browne 19'; Pierre 48'	Report	Consuegra 22', 50'; Aguliera 51'

Umpires:
Tyler Klenk (CAN)
Benjamin Peters (USA)

1 August 2019
14:00

Chile	4–0	Cuba
Becerra 14', 17'; Richter 36'; Fer. Renz 60'	Report

Umpires:
Gus Soteriades (USA)
Jonathan Altamirano (MEX)

3 August 2019
14:00

Argentina	9–0	Cuba
Tolini 11', 46'; Martínez 15', 42'; Fernandez 40'; Mazzilli 51'; Keenan 53'; Casella 53', 58'	Report

Umpires:
Gus Soteriades (USA)
Benjamin Peters {USA}

Quarter-finals

5 August 2019
18:00

Cuba	1–5	United States
Consuegra 38'	Report	Harris 36'; A. Käppeler 40'; Huisman 41', 51'; Singh 51'

Umpires:
Tyler Klenk (CAN)
Federico Silva (ARG)

Cross over

8 August 2019
09:30

Peru	0–7	Cuba
	Report	Lopez 27'; Aguilera 38'; Somonte 44'; Consuegra 48', 54'; Tratzant 50'; Calderon 53'

Umpires:
Peter Wright (RSA)
Jonathan Altamiano (MEX)

5th place match

10 August 2019
11:45

Cuba	1–2	Trinidad and Tobago
Calderon 22'	Report	James 10'; Te. Mercano 17'

Umpires:
Deepak Joshi (IND)
Hugo Romero (PAR)

=== Women's tournament ===
The following players were named in the Cuba squad.

Head Coach: Nelson Ginorio Vega

1. Yusnaidy Betancourt (GK)
2. Yurismailis Garcia (GK)
4. Sunaylis Nikle (C)
6. Roseli Harrys
8. Arlettis Tirse
9. Brizaida Ramos
11. Leticia Fernandez
12. Yunia Milanes
13. Yuraima Vera
14. Yadira Miclin
15. Jennifer Martinez
16. Jessica Ortiz
18. Yeskenia Gutierre
21. Yurima Soria
25. Yurisleydis Reyes
26. Lismary Gonzalez

Preliminary round

Pos	Team	Pld	W	D	L	GF	GA	GD	Pts	Qualification
1	Argentina	3	3	0	0	18	1	+17	9	Quarter-finals
2	Canada	3	2	0	1	15	3	+12	6	Quarter-finals
3	Uruguay	3	1	0	2	8	8	0	3	Quarter-finals
4	Cuba	3	0	0	3	2	31	−29	0	Quarter-finals

Source: FIH

29 July 2019
12:00

Canada	10–0	Cuba
Stairs 2', 19', 51'; McManus 11', 23'; Norlander 13', 54'; Secco 21'; Haughn 46'; Stewart 56'	Report

Umpires:
Liu Xiaoying (CHN)
Victoria Pazos (PAR)

31 July 2019
14:00

Uruguay	8–1	Cuba
Viana 2', 14'; Piazza 17', 19'; Cristiani 23'; Taborda 30'; Villar 39'; Stanley 46'	Report	Milanes 53'

Umpires:
Mary Driscoll (USA)
Catalina Montesino (CHI)

2 August 2019
14:00

Argentina	13–1	Cuba
M. Granatto 2'; V. Granatto 9'; Barrionuevo 9', 21', 56', 59'; Jankunas 13', 27', 39'; Rebecchi 24', 43', 49'; Luchetti 28'	Report	Milanes 22'

Umpires:
Amber Church (NZL)
Diana Fuentes Castelo (MEX)

Quarter-finals

4 August 2019
17:15

Cuba	0–9	United States
	Report	Moyer 8'; Hoffman 14'; Allessie 22', 43'; Umstead 36'; Grega 37', 53'; Manley 38'; Sharkey 44'

Umpires:
Megan Robertson (CAN)
Maria Locatelli (ARG)

Cross over

6 August 2019
11:45

Mexico	1–0	Cuba
Marí. Correa 12'	Report

Umpires:
Maria Locatelli (ARG)
Catalina Montesino (CHI)

7th place match

9 August 2019
9:30

Peru	3–2	Cuba
Montes 10', 36'; Alvarez 14'	Report	Vera 14'; Fernandez 44'

Umpires:
Natalia Lodeiro (URU)
Victoria Pazos (PAR)

== Handball ==
Summary

Team	Event	Group stage				Semifinal	Final / BM	
Team	Event	Opposition Result	Opposition Result	Opposition Result	Rank	Opposition Result	Opposition Result	Rank
Cuba men	Men's tournament	Chile; L 28–38	United States; L 25–26	Argentina; L 21–23	4	5th-8th place classification Puerto Rico; W 36–12	Fifth place match United States; W 32–24	5
Cuba women	Women's tournament	Brazil; L 20–29	Puerto Rico; W 27–24	Canada; W 28–15	2 Q	Argentina; L 21–31	United States; W 24–23	3rd place, bronze medalist(s)

=== Men's tournament ===
Pos	Team	Pld	W	D	L	GF	GA	GD	Pts	Qualification
1	Argentina	3	3	0	0	92	75	+17	6	Semifinals
2	Chile	3	2	0	1	101	85	+16	4	Semifinals
3	United States	3	1	0	2	77	97	−20	2	5–8th place semifinals
4	Cuba	3	0	0	3	74	87	−13	0	5–8th place semifinals

Source: Lima 2019
Rules for classification: 1) points; 2) head-to-head points; 3) head-to-head goal difference; 4) head-to-head goals scored; 5) goal difference; 6) goals scored; 7) draw.

31 July 2019; 13:00	Cuba	28–38	Chile	Villa Deportiva Nacional; Referees: Raluy, Sabroso (ESP)
31 July 2019; 13:00	Corzo 8	(10–20)	Er. Feuchtmann, R. Salinas 10	Villa Deportiva Nacional; Referees: Raluy, Sabroso (ESP)
31 July 2019; 13:00	2× (yellow card) 2× (suspension)	Report	1× (yellow card) 6× (suspension)	Villa Deportiva Nacional; Referees: Raluy, Sabroso (ESP)

1 August 2019; 15:30	United States	26−25	Cuba	Villa Deportiva Nacional; Referees: Lenci, López (ARG)
1 August 2019; 15:30	Hoddersen 7	(14−14)	Taboada, Veitía 5	Villa Deportiva Nacional; Referees: Lenci, López (ARG)
1 August 2019; 15:30	1× (yellow card) 4× (suspension)	Report	2× (yellow card) 2× (suspension)	Villa Deportiva Nacional; Referees: Lenci, López (ARG)

2 August 2019; 18:00	Argentina	23–21	Cuba	Villa Deportiva Nacional; Referees: Pinto, Menezes (BRA)
2 August 2019; 18:00	F. Pizarro 6	(11–10)	Corzo 5	Villa Deportiva Nacional; Referees: Pinto, Menezes (BRA)
2 August 2019; 18:00	4× (yellow card) 6× (suspension)	Report	2× (yellow card) 7× (suspension) 1× (red card)	Villa Deportiva Nacional; Referees: Pinto, Menezes (BRA)

5th-8th place classification

4 August 2019; 10:00	Puerto Rico	12–36	Cuba	Villa Deportiva Nacional; Referees: Lenci, López (ARG)
4 August 2019; 10:00	four players 2	(8–17)	García, Taboada 6	Villa Deportiva Nacional; Referees: Lenci, López (ARG)
4 August 2019; 10:00	1× (yellow card) 1× (suspension)	Report	1× (yellow card) 2× (suspension)	Villa Deportiva Nacional; Referees: Lenci, López (ARG)

Fifth place match

5 August 2019; 12:00	Cuba	32–24	United States	Villa Deportiva Nacional; Referees: Sosa, Lemes (URU)
5 August 2019; 12:00	Corzo, Toledano 5	(16–10)	Fofana 7	Villa Deportiva Nacional; Referees: Sosa, Lemes (URU)
5 August 2019; 12:00	1× (yellow card) 1× (suspension)	Report	3× (suspension) 1× (red card)	Villa Deportiva Nacional; Referees: Sosa, Lemes (URU)

=== Women's tournament ===
Pos	Team	Pld	W	D	L	GF	GA	GD	Pts	Qualification
1	Brazil	3	3	0	0	110	48	+62	6	Semifinals
2	Cuba	3	2	0	1	75	68	+7	4	Semifinals
3	Puerto Rico	3	1	0	2	63	76	−13	2	5–8th place semifinals
4	Canada	3	0	0	3	36	92	−56	0	5–8th place semifinals

Source: Lima 2019
Rules for classification: 1) points; 2) head-to-head points; 3) head-to-head goal difference; 4) head-to-head goals scored; 5) goal difference; 6) goals scored; 7) draw.

24 July 2019; 20:30	Brazil	29−20	Cuba	Villa Deportiva Nacional; Referees: Raluy, Sabroso (ESP)
24 July 2019; 20:30	De Paula 6	(13−9)	Rizo 4	Villa Deportiva Nacional; Referees: Raluy, Sabroso (ESP)
24 July 2019; 20:30	1× (yellow card) 4× (suspension)	Report	1× (yellow card) 4× (suspension)	Villa Deportiva Nacional; Referees: Raluy, Sabroso (ESP)

25 July 2019; 15:30	Cuba	27−24	Puerto Rico	Villa Deportiva Nacional; Referees: Lenci, López (ARG)
25 July 2019; 15:30	three players 4	(14−13)	Ceballos 6	Villa Deportiva Nacional; Referees: Lenci, López (ARG)
25 July 2019; 15:30	4× (suspension)	Report	2× (yellow card) 3× (suspension) 1× (red card)	Villa Deportiva Nacional; Referees: Lenci, López (ARG)

27 July 2019; 13:00	Cuba	28–15	Canada	Villa Deportiva Nacional; Referees: Paolantoni, García (ARG)
27 July 2019; 13:00	Rosabal, Téllez 6	(11–7)	Benhacine, Routhier 3	Villa Deportiva Nacional; Referees: Paolantoni, García (ARG)
27 July 2019; 13:00	3× (yellow card) 4× (suspension)	Report	1× (yellow card) 6× (suspension)	Villa Deportiva Nacional; Referees: Paolantoni, García (ARG)

Semifinal

29 July 2019; 18:00	Argentina	31–21	Cuba	Villa Deportiva Nacional; Referees: Raluy, Sabroso (ESP)
29 July 2019; 18:00	Karsten 6	(17–7)	Rizo 8	Villa Deportiva Nacional; Referees: Raluy, Sabroso (ESP)
29 July 2019; 18:00	2× (yellow card) 3× (suspension)	Report	2× (yellow card) 3× (suspension) 1× (red card)	Villa Deportiva Nacional; Referees: Raluy, Sabroso (ESP)

Bronze medal match

30 July 2019; 18:00	Cuba	24–23	United States	Villa Deportiva Nacional; Referees: Paolantoni, García (ARG)
30 July 2019; 18:00	Rizo 6	(13–12)	Andersen 8	Villa Deportiva Nacional; Referees: Paolantoni, García (ARG)
30 July 2019; 18:00	2× (yellow card) 4× (suspension)	Report	3× (suspension)	Villa Deportiva Nacional; Referees: Paolantoni, García (ARG)

== Judo ==
Men

Athlete	Event	Round of 16	Quarterfinals	Semifinals	Repechage	Final / BM	
Athlete	Event	Opposition Result	Opposition Result	Opposition Result	Opposition Result	Opposition Result	Rank
Roberto Almenares	−60 kg	Bye	B Vergara (PAN); W 01S2–00S2	R Torres (BRA); L 00–11	—N/a	E Ramírez (DOM); W 10–00S2	3rd place, bronze medalist(s)
Osniel Solís	−66 kg	Bye	J González (COL); W 01–00	W Mateo (DOM); L 00–01S1	—N/a	N Castillo (MEX); W 10S1–00S2	3rd place, bronze medalist(s)
Magdiel Estrada	−73 kg	Bye	L Navarro (COL); W 10S1–00S1	S Mattey (VEN); W 10S2–00S1	—N/a	A Wong (PER); W 10S1–00S2	1st place, gold medalist(s)
Jorge Martínez	−81 kg	Bye	A Gandia (PUR); W 01S1–00	M del Orbe (DOM); L 00–01S1	—N/a	N Peña (VEN); W 11S1–01S1	3rd place, bronze medalist(s)
Iván Felipe Silva	−90 kg	Bye	A Peña (VEN); W 10–00S1	R Macedo (BRA); W 10S1–00S3	—N/a	F Balanta (COL); W 10–00	1st place, gold medalist(s)
Liester Cardona	−100 kg	Bye	J Osório (PER); W 10–00S2	T Briceño (CHI); L 00S1–01S2	—N/a	L Medina (DOM); L 01S3–11S2	5
Andy Granda	+100 kg	Bye	J Nova (DOM); W 10S2–00S2	D Moura (BRA); W 10S2–00S2	—N/a	P Pineda (VEN); W 10S1–00S2	1st place, gold medalist(s)

Women

Athlete	Event	Round of 16	Quarterfinals	Semifinals	Repechage	Final / BM	
Athlete	Event	Opposition Result	Opposition Result	Opposition Result	Opposition Result	Opposition Result	Rank
Vanesa Godínez	−48 kg	Bye	A Suzuki (USA); W 10–00S3	P Pareto (ARG); W 10S1–00S3	—N/a	E Soriano (DOM); L 00S2–01S2	2nd place, silver medalist(s)
Nahomys Acosta	−52 kg	Bye	K Jiménez (PAN); W 10–00S3	L Olvera (MEX); L 00S2–10	—N/a	D de Jesús (DOM); W 01S1–00S2	3rd place, bronze medalist(s)
Anailys Dorvigny	−57 kg	Bye	E García (MEX); W 10S1–00S3	R Silva (BRA); L 00–10	—N/a	Y Amaris (COL); L 00–10S2	(bronze) ^{[a]}
Maylin del Toro	−63 kg	Bye	M Choconta (COL); W 10–00	P Awiti (MEX); W 01S1–00S2	—N/a	A Barrios (VEN); W 01S2–00S1	1st place, gold medalist(s)
Onix Cortés	−70 kg	Bye	E Burt (CAN); W 10S2–00S3	Y Alvear (COL); L 00S2–10	—N/a	E Drisdale-Daley (JAM); W 10S1–00S3	3rd place, bronze medalist(s)
Kaliema Antomarchi	−78 kg	Bye	D Brenes (CRC); W 01S2–00S2	V Chala (ECU); W 10S1–00S1	—N/a	M Aguiar (BRA); L 00S1–10S1	2nd place, silver medalist(s)
Idalys Ortiz	+78 kg	Bye	G Wood (TTO); W 10–00	N Cutro-Kelly (USA); W 10–00	—N/a	M Mojica (PUR); W 10S1–00S3	1st place, gold medalist(s)

- ^{57 kg} Rafaela Silva from Brazil was stripped of her gold medal for doping violation.

== Karate ==
Kumite (sparring)

Athlete	Event	Round robin				Semifinal	Final	
Athlete	Event	Opposition Result	Opposition Result	Opposition Result	Rank	Opposition Result	Opposition Result	Rank
Maikel Noriega	Men's –67 kg	Ávila (PER); W 0-0	Velozo (CHI); L 0-4	Delgado (VEN); L 1-5	3	Did not advance		
Baurelys Torres	Women's –55 kg	Navarrete (VEN); W 3-1	Vindrola (PER); W 3-0	Campbell (DOM); W 9-0	1 Q	Kumizaki (BRA); L 0-3	Did not advance	3rd place, bronze medalist(s)
Cirelys Martínez	Women's –68 kg	López (PER); W 1-1	Li (CHI); W 2-1	Rodríguez (DOM); L 0-3	3	Did not advance		

== Modern pentathlon ==
Cuba qualified five modern pentathletes (two men and three women).

Athlete	Event	Fencing (Épée one touch)			Swimming (200 m freestyle)			Riding (Show jumping)			Shooting / Running (10 m laser pistol / 3000 m cross-country)			Total	
Athlete	Event	V – D	Rank	MP points	Time	Rank	MP points	Penalties	Rank	MP points	Time	Rank	MP points	MP points	Rank
Lester Rosário	Men's individual	19-12	12	229	2:04.66	4	301	21	11	279	10:58.00	3	642	1451	4
José Ricardo García	Men's individual	19-12	8	231	2:14.73	19	281	7	3	293	11:13.00	7	627	1432	6
Lester Rosário; José Ricardo García	Men's relay	16-10	4	235	1:56.97	6	317	EL		0	11:46.00	9	594	1146	12
Leydi Laura López	Women's individual	20-11	8	236	2:22.01	5	266	12	7	288	12:43.00	537	7	1327	3rd place, bronze medalist(s)
Eliani Rodríguez	Women's individual	20-11	9	236	2:26.21	12	258	7	4	293	13:42.00	478	17	1265	8
Delmis Guevara	Women's individual	16-15	13	208	2:18.89	1	273	78	16	222	13:48.00	472	19	1175	12
Leydi Laura López; Eliani Rodríguez	Women's relay	20-20	6	214	2:08.28	1	294	40	2	260	12:20.00	3	560	1328	2nd place, silver medalist(s)
José Ricardo García; Leydi Laura López	Mixed relay	35-13	2	255	2:02.94	3	305	34	9	266	11:11.00	1	629	1455	2nd place, silver medalist(s)

== Racquetball ==
Cuba qualified four racquetball athletes (two men and two women).

Men

Athlete	Event	Qualifying Round robin				Round of 16	Quarterfinals	Semifinals	Final	Rank
Athlete	Event	Match 1	Match 2	Match 3	Rank	Opposition Result	Opposition Result	Opposition Result	Opposition Result	Rank
Maykel Moyet	Singles	(Dominican Republic) Ramón de León; L 1–2	(Peru) Erik Mendoza; W 2–0	(Mexico) Rodrigo Montoya; L 0–2	3	Did not advance				
Enier Chacón	Singles	(Argentina) Fernando Kurzbard; W 2–0	(Dominican Republic) Luis Pérez; L 0–2	(Canada) Samuel Murray; L 0–2	3	Did not advance				
Maykel Moyet; Enier Chacón	Doubles	(Mexico) Francisco Javier Mar; Rodrigo Montoya; L 0–2	(Costa Rica) Andrés Acuña; Felipe Camacho; L 0–2	(Dominican Republic) Ramón de León; Luis Pérez; L 1–2	4	(Argentina) Fernando Kurzbard; Shai Manzuri; W 2–1	(Bolivia) Roland Keller; Conrrado Moscoso; L 0–2	Did not advance		5
Maykel Moyet; Enier Chacón	Team	—N/a				Ecuador; L 1–2	Did not advance			9

Women

Athlete	Event	Qualifying Round robin				Round of 16	Quarterfinals	Semifinals	Final	Rank
Athlete	Event	Match 1	Match 2	Match 3	Rank	Opposition Result	Opposition Result	Opposition Result	Opposition Result	Rank
María Regla González	Singles	(Chile) Josefa Parada; W 2–0	(Bolivia) Valeria Centellas; L 0–2	(Colombia) Cristina Amaya; L 0–2	3	Did not advance				
Loraine Felipe	Singles	(Chile) Carla Muñoz; L 0–2	(Ecuador) María José Muñoz; L 0–2	(Bolivia) Angelica Barrios; L 0–2	4	Did not advance				
María Regla González; Loraine Felipe	Doubles	(Colombia) Cristina Amaya; Adriana Riveros; L 0–2	(Argentina) Natalia Mendez; María José Vargas; L 0–2	(Chile) Carla Muñoz; Josefa Parada; L 1–2	4	(Cuba) Cristina Amaya; Adriana Riveros; D 0–2	Did not advance			9
María Regla González; Loraine Felipe	Team	—N/a				Bolivia; L 0–2	Did not advance			9

== Roller sports ==
=== Speed ===
Athlete	Event	Preliminary		Semifinal		Final	
Athlete	Event	Time	Rank	Time	Rank	Time	Rank
David Martínez	Men's 10,000 m elimination	—N/a				Eliminated	
Haila Álvarez	Women's 300 m time trial	—N/a				27.505	7
Haila Álvarez	Women's 500 m	47.203	3	Did not advance			
Amanda Casadelvalle	Women's 10,000 m elimination	—N/a				Eliminated	

== Rowing ==
Men

Athlete	Event	Heat		Repechage		Semifinal		Final	
Athlete	Event	Time	Rank	Time	Rank	Time	Rank	Time	Rank
Ángel Fournier	Single sculls	7:00.27	1 SF	Bye		7:00.04	1 FA	6:51.10	1st place, gold medalist(s)
Boris Guerra; Adrián Oquendo	Double sculls	6:25.78	1 FA	Bye		—N/a		6:27.43	2nd place, silver medalist(s)
Yhoan Uribarri; Alexei Carballosa	Lightweight double sculls	6:25.78	1º FA	Bye		—N/a		6:31.66	4
Jorge Patterson; Reidy Cardona; Boris Guerra; Adrian Oquendo	Quadruple sculls	7:01.65	4 F	—N/a				5:52.74	2nd place, silver medalist(s)
Carlos Ajete; Jesús Rodríguez	Pair	7:55.03	6 F	—N/a				6:43.08	4
Eduardo González; Carlos Ajete; Reidy Cardona; Jesús Rodríguez	Four	6:29.99	3 F	—N/a				6:09.53	2nd place, silver medalist(s)
Ennier Tamayo; Yhoan Uribarri; Alexei Carballosa; Osvaldo Pérez	Lightweight Four	6:28.86	4 F	—N/a				6:08.02	3rd place, bronze medalist(s)
Boris Guerra; Yoelvis Hernández; Eduardo González; Jorge Patterson; Carlos Ajete; Reidy Cardona; Adrian Oquendo; Jesús Rodríguez; Yadian Rodríguez	Eight	7:07.73	6 F	—N/a				5:43.97	3rd place, bronze medalist(s)

Women

Athlete	Event	Heat		Repechage		Final	
Athlete	Event	Time	Rank	Time	Rank	Time	Rank
Yudeisy Rodríguez	Single sculls	7:56.93	3 R	7:47.48	2 FA	7:52.05	4
Milena Venega	Lightweight single sculls	7:50.44	2 FA	Bye		7:46.72	3rd place, bronze medalist(s)
Aimee Hernández; Yariulvis Cobas	Double sculls	7:05.77	1 F	—N/a		7:10.74	1st place, gold medalist(s)
Rosana Serrano; Milena Venega	Lightweight double sculls	7:22.60	2 R	7:16.82	2 FA	7:16.59	3rd place, bronze medalist(s)
Rayma Ortíz; Aimee Hernández; Yariulvis Cobas; Marelis González	Quadruple sculls	6:48.57	2 F	—N/a		6:34.01	2nd place, silver medalist(s)

== Sailing ==
Men

Athlete	Event	Race													Total	
Athlete	Event	1	2	3	4	5	6	7	8	9	10	11	12	M	Points	Rank
Alejandro Fernández	RS:X	7	8	7	6	7	8	7	7	4	6	8	~~9~~	Did not advance	75	8
Dennier Infante	Laser	19	~~21~~	21	17	18	21	20	20	18	19	—N/a		Did not advance	173	20

Women

Athlete	Event	Race													Total	
Athlete	Event	1	2	3	4	5	6	7	8	9	10	11	12	M	Points	Rank
Neyaris Ávila	RS:X	5	7	~~9~~; DNF	7	7	8	7	6	7	8	9	7	Did not advance	78	7
Sanlay Castro	Laser radial	16	~~17~~	13	17	16	13	16	13	14	16	—N/a		Did not advance	134	17

Mixed

Athlete	Event	Race													Total	
Athlete	Event	1	2	3	4	5	6	7	8	9	10	11	12	M	Points	Rank
Nélido Manso; Iris Manso	Snipe	~~7~~	2	4	5	3	6	3	2	4	4	—N/a		8	41	4

Open

Athlete	Event	Race											Total	
Athlete	Event	1	2	3	4	5	6	7	8	9	10	M	Points	Rank
Lester Hernández	Sunfish	10	12	12	13	11	13	10	~~14~~; UFD	11	5	Did not advance	97	13

== Shooting ==
Men

Athlete	Event	Qualification		Final	
Athlete	Event	Points	Rank	Points	Rank
Jorge Grau	10 m air pistol	574	2 Q	237.3	1st place, gold medalist(s)
Guillermo Pías	10 m air pistol	565	14	Did not advance	
Jorge Llanes	25 m rapid fire pistol	580	3 Q	28	1st place, gold medalist(s)
Leuris Pupo	25 m rapid fire pistol	581	3 Q	26	2nd place, silver medalist(s)
Alexander Molerio	10 m air rifle	613.2	15	Did not advance	
Alexander Molerio	50 m rifle three position	1146	9	Did not advance	
Rainier Quintanilla	10 m air rifle	611.5	19	Did not advance	
Rainier Quintanilla	50 m rifle three position	1139	14	Did not advance	
Juan Miguel Rodríguez	Skeet	114	17	Did not advance	
Guillermo Torres	Skeet	111	21	Did not advance	

Women

Athlete	Event	Qualification		Final	
Athlete	Event	Points	Rank	Points	Rank
Laina Pérez	10 m air pistol	561	7 Q	237.1	1st place, gold medalist(s)
Laina Pérez	25 m pistol	561	13	Did not advance	
Sheyla González	10 m air pistol	566	3 Q	213.1	3rd place, bronze medalist(s)
Sheyla González	25 m pistol	565	9	Did not advance	
Dianelys Pérez	10 m air rifle	618.1	10	Did not advance	
Dianelys Pérez	50 m rifle three position	1164	3 Q	430.8	4
Eglys de la Cruz	10 m air rifle	610.4	19	Did not advance	
Eglys de la Cruz	50 m rifle three position	1151	7 Q	454.2	2nd place, silver medalist(s)

Mixed

Athlete	Event	Qualification		Final	
Athlete	Event	Points	Rank	Points	Rank
Jorge Grau; Laina Pérez	10 m air pistol	755	5 Q	475.0 PR	1st place, gold medalist(s)
Guillermo Pías; Sheyla González	10 m air pistol	758	4 Q	326.7	5
Alexander Molerio; Eglys de la Cruz	10 m air rifle	823.6	8	Did not advance	
Rainier Quintanilla; Danielys Pérez	10 m air rifle	807.9	21	Did not advance	

== Softball ==
Cuba qualified a men's team (of 15 athletes) by being ranked in the top five nations at the 2017 Pan American Championships.

=== Men's tournament ===
Preliminary round

Team	Pld	W	L	RF	RA	RD	Qualification
Argentina	5	5	0	29	4	+25	Qualified for the semifinals
United States	5	4	1	38	10	+28	Qualified for the semifinals
Cuba	5	3	2	33	22	+11	Qualified for the semifinals
Mexico	5	2	3	31	23	+8	Qualified for the semifinals
Venezuela	5	1	4	7	17	−10	
Peru	5	0	5	0	62	−62	

25 July 2019; 16:00	Peru	0–15 (F/4)	Cuba	Softball Field, Villa María del Triunfo; Attendance: 475
25 July 2019; 16:00		Boxscore		Softball Field, Villa María del Triunfo; Attendance: 475

27 July 2019; 13:00	United States	4–2	Cuba	Softball Field, Villa María del Triunfo; Attendance: 723
27 July 2019; 13:00		Boxscore		Softball Field, Villa María del Triunfo; Attendance: 723

28 July 2019; 13:00	Cuba	12–10	Mexico	Softball Field, Villa María del Triunfo; Attendance: 667
28 July 2019; 13:00		Boxscore		Softball Field, Villa María del Triunfo; Attendance: 667

29 July 2019; 10:00	Cuba	1–8	Argentina	Softball Field, Villa María del Triunfo
29 July 2019; 10:00		Boxscore		Softball Field, Villa María del Triunfo

30 July 2019; 10:00	Venezuela	0–3	Cuba	Softball Field, Villa María del Triunfo
30 July 2019; 10:00		Boxscore		Softball Field, Villa María del Triunfo

Semifinals

31 July 2019; 10:00	Cuba	4–7	Mexico	Softball Field, Villa María del Triunfo
31 July 2019; 10:00		Boxscore		Softball Field, Villa María del Triunfo

== Table tennis ==
Men

Athlete	Event	Group stage			Round of 32	Round of 16	Quarterfinal	Semifinal	Final / BM	
Athlete	Event	Opposition Result	Opposition Result	Rank	Opposition Result	Opposition Result	Opposition Result	Opposition Result	Opposition Result	Rank
Andy Pereira	Singles	—N/a			Wang (CAN); L 3–4	Did not advance				
Jorge Campos	Singles	—N/a			Wu (DOM); L 2–4	Did not advance				
Jorge Campos; Andy Pereira	Doubles	—N/a				Gatica / Moscoso (GUA); W 4–0	Calderano / Tsuboi (BRA); L 3–4	Did not advance		
Jorge Campos; Livan Martínez; Andy Pereira	Team	Dominican Republic; W 3–1	Chile; W 3–0	1 Q	—N/a		Canada; W 1–3, 3–0, 3–2, 3–2	Argentina; L 2–3, 0–3, 2–3	Did not advance	3rd place, bronze medalist(s)

Women

Athlete	Event	Group stage			Round of 32	Round of 16	Quarterfinal	Semifinal	Final / BM	
Athlete	Event	Opposition Result	Opposition Result	Rank	Opposition Result	Opposition Result	Opposition Result	Opposition Result	Opposition Result	Rank
Daniela Fonseca	Singles	—N/a			Yamada (BRA); L 2–4	Did not advance				
Idalys Lovet	Singles	—N/a			Enríquez (GUA); W 4–3	Zhang (USA); L 0–4	Did not advance			
Daniela Fonseca; Idalys Lovet	Doubles	—N/a				Bye	Ortega / Vega (CHI); L 3–4	Did not advance		
Daniela Fonseca; Idalys Lovet; Lizdainet Rodríguez	Team	Puerto Rico; L 1–3	Dominican Republic; W 3–1	2 Q	—N/a		United States; L 0–3, 0–3, 0–3	Did not advance		

Mixed

Athlete	Event	Round of 16	Quarterfinal	Semifinal	Final / BM	
Athlete	Event	Opposition Result	Opposition Result	Opposition Result	Opposition Result	Rank
Jorge Campos; Daniela Fonseca	Doubles	Bye	Cifuentes / Argüelles (ARG); W 4–3	Wang / Zhang (CAN); L 0–4	Did not advance	

== Taekwondo ==
Kyorugi (sparring)

Men

Athlete	Event	Preliminary round	Quarterfinal	Semifinal	Repechage	Final / BM	
Athlete	Event	Opposition Result	Opposition Result	Opposition Result	Opposition Result	Opposition Result	Rank
Rogelio López	–68 kg	Nava (MEX); L 6–27	Did not advance				
José Cobas	–80 kg	Padilla (ECU); W 22–2	Rahimi (USA); W 11–3	Trejos (COL); L 19–22	Bye	Bronze medal contest Barbosa (PUR); W 12–7	3rd place, bronze medalist(s)
Rafael Alba	+80 kg	Bye	Perea (ECU); W 21–7	Sansores (BRA); W 33–25	Bye	Healy (USA); L 6–13	2nd place, silver medalist(s)

Women

Athlete	Event	Preliminary round	Quarterfinal	Semifinal	Repechage	Final / BM	
Athlete	Event	Opposition Result	Opposition Result	Opposition Result	Opposition Result	Opposition Result	Rank
Yania Aguirre	–49 kg	Pedroza (GUA); W 11–7	Yong (CAN); W 20–7	Souza (MEX); L 3–14	—N/a	Bronze medal contest Rodriguez (USA); L 7–16	5
Yamicel Núñez	–57 kg	Carstens (PAN); L 0–20	Did not advance				
Arlettys Acosta	–67 kg	Alvarado (CRC); W 0–0	Heredia (MEX); W 5–1	Titoneli (BRA); L 5–10	—N/a	Bronze medal contest Arnoldt (ARG); W 10–7	3rd place, bronze medalist(s)
Yamitsi Carbonell	+67 kg	Weekes (PUR); W' 12–2	Cuma (CAN); W 20–9	Acosta (MEX); L 8–11	Bye	Bronze medal contest Gorman-Shore (USA); L 5–8	5

== Tennis ==
Men

Athlete	Event	Round of 64	Round of 32	Round of 16	Quarterfinal	Semifinal	Final / BM	
Athlete	Event	Opposition Result	Opposition Result	Opposition Result	Opposition Result	Opposition Result	Opposition Result	Rank
Osmel Rivera Granja	Singles	Obando (HON); W 6–4, 6–1	Giraldo (COL); L 0–6, 1–6	Did not advance				
Yoan Pérez	Singles	Álvarez (PER); L 0–6, 0–6	Did not advance					
Yoan Pérez; Osmel Rivera Granja	Doubles	—N/a	Bye	Barrios / Tabilo (CHI); L 3–6, 2–6	Did not advance			

== Volleyball ==
=== Beach ===
Cuba qualified four beach volleyball athletes (two men and two women).

Athletes	Event	Preliminary Round			Rank	Round of 16	Quarterfinals	Semifinals	Final / BM	
Athletes	Event	Opposition Score	Opposition Score	Opposition Score	Rank	Opposition Score	Opposition Score	Opposition Score	Opposition Score	Rank
Sergio González; Luis Reyes	Men's tournament	Vieyto – Cairus (URU); L (21–15, 16–21, 8–15)	Alpízar – Valenciano (CRC); W (21–13, 21–16)	Brandão – Dealtry (BRA); W (16–21, 21–14, 18–16)	2 Q	Medina – Sánchez (DOM); W (21–17, 21–14)	Grimalt – Grimalt (CHI); L (13–21, 16–21)	5th-8th place classification Hernández – Gómez (VEN); W (14–21, 26–24, 15–12)	5th place match Vieyto – Cairus (URU); W (21–17, 21–16)	5
Maylen Delís; Leila Martínez	Women's tournament	Caballero – Valiente (PAR); W (16–21, 21–12, 15–13)	Vargas – Vasquez (ESA); W (18–21, 21–12, 15–7)	Allcca – Mendoza (PER); W (21–12, 21–11)	1 Q	—N/a	Araya – Valenciano (CRC); W (21–17, 21–14)	Gallay – Pereyra (ARG); L (19–21, 22–24)	Bronze medal Horta – Lavalle (BRA); L (19–21, 18–21)	4

=== Indoor ===
Cuba qualified a men's volleyball team, consisting of 12 athletes.

Summary

Team	Event	Group stage				Semifinal	Final / BM / Pl.	
Team	Event	Opposition Result	Opposition Result	Opposition Result	Rank	Opposition Result	Opposition Result	Rank
Cuba men	Men's tournament	Argentina; L 0–3	Puerto Rico; W 3–1	Peru; W 3–0	2 Q	Brazil; W 3–0	Argentina; L 0–3	2nd place, silver medalist(s)

=== Men's tournament ===
Group stage

Pos	Team	Pld	W	L	Pts	SW	SL	SR	SPW	SPL	SPR	Qualification
1	Argentina	3	3	0	15	9	0	MAX	231	183	1.262	Semifinals
2	Cuba	3	2	1	9	6	4	1.500	245	214	1.145	Semifinals
3	Puerto Rico	3	1	2	5	4	7	0.571	228	245	0.931	5th–6th place match
4	Peru (H)	3	0	3	1	1	9	0.111	187	249	0.751	7th–8th place match

Source: Lima 2019
(H) Host

31 July 2019; 14:30	Cuba	0–3	Argentina	Callao Sports Center; Referees: Walter Vera (PER), Paulo Luis Beal (BRA)
31 July 2019; 14:30	(26–28, 22–25, 22–25); P2 P3			Callao Sports Center; Referees: Walter Vera (PER), Paulo Luis Beal (BRA)

1 August 2019; 14:30	Cuba	3–1	Puerto Rico	Callao Sports Center; Referees: Luis Paulo Beal (BRA), Brian Hemelgarn (USA)
1 August 2019; 14:30	(25–18, 25–19, 25–27, 25–20); P2 P3			Callao Sports Center; Referees: Luis Paulo Beal (BRA), Brian Hemelgarn (USA)

2 August 2019; 14:30	Peru	0–3	Cuba	Callao Sports Center; Referees: David Reyes (PUR), Brian Hemelgarn (USA)
2 August 2019; 14:30	(15–25, 18–25, 19–25); P2 P3			Callao Sports Center; Referees: David Reyes (PUR), Brian Hemelgarn (USA)

Semifinals

3 August 2019; 18:30	Brazil	0–3	Cuba	Callao Sports Center; Referees: Walter Vera (PER), Brian Hemelgarn (USA)
3 August 2019; 18:30	(16–25, 22–25, 21–25); P2 P3			Callao Sports Center; Referees: Walter Vera (PER), Brian Hemelgarn (USA)

Gold medal match

4 August 2018; 21:00	Cuba	0–3	Argentina	Callao Sports Center; Referees: Walter Vera (PER), Paulo Luis Beal (BRA)
4 August 2018; 21:00	(20–25, 17–25, 20–25); P2 P3			Callao Sports Center; Referees: Walter Vera (PER), Paulo Luis Beal (BRA)

== Water polo ==
Summary

Team	Event	Group stage				Quarterfinal	Semifinal	Final / BM / Pl.	
Team	Event	Opposition Result	Opposition Result	Opposition Result	Rank	Opposition Result	Opposition Result	Opposition Result	Rank
Cuba men	Men's tournament	United States; L 6–21	Puerto Rico; W 10–8	Canada; L 11–20	3 Q	Argentina; L 7–9	5th-8th place classification Peru; W 17–5	Fifth place match Puerto Rico; W 8–7	5
Cuba women	Women's tournament	Canada; L 5–20	Mexico; W 13–4	Peru; W 19–5	2 Q	Puerto Rico; W 14–5	United States; L 7–31	Bronze medal match Brazil; L 7–8	4

=== Men's tournament ===
Preliminary round

Pos	Team	Pld	W	D	L	GF	GA	GD	Pts	Qualification
1	United States	3	3	0	0	58	18	+40	6	Quarterfinals
2	Canada	3	2	0	1	51	31	+20	4	Quarterfinals
3	Cuba	3	1	0	2	27	49	−22	2	Quarterfinals
4	Puerto Rico	3	0	0	3	16	54	−38	0	Quarterfinals

Source: Lima 2019
Rules for classification: 1) points; 2) head-to-head points; 3) head-to-head goal difference; 4) head-to-head number of goals scored; 5) goal difference.

4 August 2019; 15:00	Report	Cuba	6–21	United States	Villa María del Truinfo Aquatic Centre, Lima; Referees: Arkadii Voevodin (RUS); Fabio Toffoli (BRA)
4 August 2019; 15:00	Report	Score by quarters: 1–6, 0–5, 5–4, 0–6			Villa María del Truinfo Aquatic Centre, Lima; Referees: Arkadii Voevodin (RUS); Fabio Toffoli (BRA)
4 August 2019; 15:00	Report	Carales, Ponsa 2	Goals	Bowen 5	Villa María del Truinfo Aquatic Centre, Lima; Referees: Arkadii Voevodin (RUS); Fabio Toffoli (BRA)

5 August 2019; 18:00	Report	Cuba	10–8	Puerto Rico	Villa María del Truinfo Aquatic Centre, Lima; Referees: Daniel Daners (URU); Fernando Varela (PER)
5 August 2019; 18:00	Report	Score by quarters: 3–3, 1–3, 3–1, 3–1			Villa María del Truinfo Aquatic Centre, Lima; Referees: Daniel Daners (URU); Fernando Varela (PER)
5 August 2019; 18:00	Report	Carales 4	Goals	Loubriel 2	Villa María del Truinfo Aquatic Centre, Lima; Referees: Daniel Daners (URU); Fernando Varela (PER)

6 August 2019; 15:00	Report	Cuba	11–20	Canada	Villa María del Truinfo Aquatic Centre, Lima; Referees: Gerardo Arellano (MEX); Boris Margeta (SLO)
6 August 2019; 15:00	Report	Score by quarters: 2–6, 3–5, 2–4, 4–5			Villa María del Truinfo Aquatic Centre, Lima; Referees: Gerardo Arellano (MEX); Boris Margeta (SLO)
6 August 2019; 15:00	Report	Carales, Contreras 3	Goals	Constantin-Bicari 6	Villa María del Truinfo Aquatic Centre, Lima; Referees: Gerardo Arellano (MEX); Boris Margeta (SLO)

Quarterfinal

8 August 2019; 16:30	Report	Cuba	7–9	Argentina	Villa María del Triunfo Aquatic Centre, Lima; Referees: Boris Margeta (SLO); Daniel Vázquez (MEX)
8 August 2019; 16:30	Report	Score by quarters: 1–2, 2–3, 2–2, 2–2			Villa María del Triunfo Aquatic Centre, Lima; Referees: Boris Margeta (SLO); Daniel Vázquez (MEX)
8 August 2019; 16:30	Report	Carales 5	Goals	four players 2	Villa María del Triunfo Aquatic Centre, Lima; Referees: Boris Margeta (SLO); Daniel Vázquez (MEX)

5th–8th place semifinals

9 August 2019; 16:30	Report	Cuba	17–5	Peru	Villa María del Triunfo Aquatic Centre, Lima; Referees: Steven Rotsart (USA); Marcus Gresele (BRA)
9 August 2019; 16:30	Report	Score by quarters: 5–1, 0–0, 5–1, 7–3			Villa María del Triunfo Aquatic Centre, Lima; Referees: Steven Rotsart (USA); Marcus Gresele (BRA)
9 August 2019; 16:30	Report	Carales 8	Goals	Otero, Villar 2	Villa María del Triunfo Aquatic Centre, Lima; Referees: Steven Rotsart (USA); Marcus Gresele (BRA)

Fifth place match

10 August 2019; 16:30	Report	Puerto Rico	7–8	Cuba	Villa María del Triunfo Aquatic Centre, Lima; Referees: Doriel Terpenka (CAN); Diego Garibaldi (ARG)
10 August 2019; 16:30	Report	Score by quarters: 2–3, 2–3, 1–1, 2–1			Villa María del Triunfo Aquatic Centre, Lima; Referees: Doriel Terpenka (CAN); Diego Garibaldi (ARG)
10 August 2019; 16:30	Report	Loubriel 3	Goals	Carales 5	Villa María del Triunfo Aquatic Centre, Lima; Referees: Doriel Terpenka (CAN); Diego Garibaldi (ARG)

=== Women's tournament ===
Preliminary round

Pos	Team	Pld	W	D	L	GF	GA	GD	Pts	Qualification
1	Canada	3	3	0	0	75	13	+62	6	Quarterfinals
2	Cuba	3	2	0	1	37	29	+8	4	Quarterfinals
3	Mexico	3	1	0	2	32	41	−9	2	Quarterfinals
4	Peru (H)	3	0	0	3	8	69	−61	0	Quarterfinals

Source: Lima 2019
Rules for classification: 1) points; 2) head-to-head points; 3) head-to-head goal difference; 4) head-to-head number of goals scored; 5) goal difference.
(H) Hosts

4 August 2019; 9:30	Report	Cuba	5–20	Canada	Villa María del Triunfo Aquatic Centre, Lima; Referees: Reynel Torres (PUR); Amber Drury (USA)
4 August 2019; 9:30	Report	Score by quarters: 1-4, 1-4, 0-7, 3-5			Villa María del Triunfo Aquatic Centre, Lima; Referees: Reynel Torres (PUR); Amber Drury (USA)
4 August 2019; 9:30	Report	Villa 3	Goals	Crevier, Fournier 4	Villa María del Triunfo Aquatic Centre, Lima; Referees: Reynel Torres (PUR); Amber Drury (USA)

5 August 2019; 12:30	Report	Cuba	13–4	Mexico	Villa María del Triunfo Aquatic Centre, Lima; Referees: Leonardo González (VEN); Fabio Toffoli (BRA)
5 August 2019; 12:30	Report	Score by quarters: 3-1, 2-0, 3-2, 5-1			Villa María del Triunfo Aquatic Centre, Lima; Referees: Leonardo González (VEN); Fabio Toffoli (BRA)
5 August 2019; 12:30	Report	Leyva, Villa 4	Goals	four players 1	Villa María del Triunfo Aquatic Centre, Lima; Referees: Leonardo González (VEN); Fabio Toffoli (BRA)

6 August 2019; 9:30	Report	Cuba	19–5	Peru	Villa María del Triunfo Aquatic Centre, Lima; Referees: Reynel Torres (PUR); Amber Drury (USA)
6 August 2019; 9:30	Report	Score by quarters: 4-0, 6-0, 4-1, 5-4			Villa María del Triunfo Aquatic Centre, Lima; Referees: Reynel Torres (PUR); Amber Drury (USA)
6 August 2019; 9:30	Report	Villa 4	Goals	Deza 2	Villa María del Triunfo Aquatic Centre, Lima; Referees: Reynel Torres (PUR); Amber Drury (USA)

Quarterfinal

8 August 2019; 09:30	Report	Puerto Rico	5–14	Cuba	VMT Aquatic Centre, Lima; Referees: Marie-Claude Deslieres (CAN); Néstor Ricardo Guerra Torres (PER)
8 August 2019; 09:30	Report	Score by quarters: 1–4, 1–2, 1–4, 2–4			VMT Aquatic Centre, Lima; Referees: Marie-Claude Deslieres (CAN); Néstor Ricardo Guerra Torres (PER)

Semifinals

9 August 2019; 12:30	Report	Cuba	7–31	United States	VMT Aquatic Centre, Lima; Referees: Daniel Federico Daners (URU); Néstor Ricardo Guerra Torres (PER)
9 August 2019; 12:30	Report	Score by quarters: 2–9, 3–5, 0–11, 2–6			VMT Aquatic Centre, Lima; Referees: Daniel Federico Daners (URU); Néstor Ricardo Guerra Torres (PER)

Bronze medal match

10 August 2019; 11:00	Report	Brazil	8–7	Cuba	VMT Aquatic Centre, Lima; Referees: Marie-Claude Deslieres (CAN); Amber Marie Drury (USA)
10 August 2019; 11:00	Report	Score by quarters: 0–1, 5–3, 2–2, 1–1			VMT Aquatic Centre, Lima; Referees: Marie-Claude Deslieres (CAN); Amber Marie Drury (USA)
10 August 2019; 11:00	Report	three players 2	Goals	Carrasco 3	VMT Aquatic Centre, Lima; Referees: Marie-Claude Deslieres (CAN); Amber Marie Drury (USA)

== Weightlifting ==
Cuba qualified eight weightlifters (four men and four women).

Men

Athlete	Event	Snatch		Clean & jerk		Total	
Athlete	Event	Weight	Rank	Weight	Rank	Weight	Rank
Arley Calderon	–61 kg	115	7	155	5	270	6
Olfides Sáez	–96 kg	160	7	206	3	366	4
Juan Columbié	–109 kg	175	3	205	3	380	4
Luis Lauret	+109 kg	181	2	218	2	399	2nd place, silver medalist(s)

Women

Athlete	Event	Snatch		Clearn & jerk		Total	
Athlete	Event	Weight	Rank	Weight	Rank	Weight	Rank
Ludia Montero	–49 kg	82	3	93	5	175	5
Marina Rodríguez	–64 kg	96	5	126	3	222	5
Melissa Aguilera	–76 kg	102	5	127	5	229	5
Yaneisy Merino	–76 kg	100	6	125	6	225	6

== Wrestling ==
Key:
- VT – Victory by fall.
- PP – Decision by points – the loser with technical points.
- PO – Decision by points – the loser without technical points.
- SP – Technical superiority – the loser with technical points and a margin of victory of at least 9 (Greco-Roman) or 10 (freestyle) points.
- ST – Great superiority – the loser without technical points and a margin of victory of at least 8 (Greco-Roman) or 10 (freestyle) points.
- VA – Decision by withdrawal

Men

Athlete	Event	Round of 16	Quarterfinal	Semifinal	Final / BM	
Athlete	Event	Opposition Result	Opposition Result	Opposition Result	Opposition Result	Rank
Reineri Andreu	Freestyle 57 kg	—N/a	Mejías (VEN); W 4–0	Fix (USA); L 1–4	Bronze medal contest Nascimento (BRA); W 10–0	3rd place, bronze medalist(s)
Alejandro Valdés	Freestyle 65 kg	—N/a	Eierman (USA); W 4–0	Destribats (ARG); W 4–0	Rudesindo (DOM); W 10–0	1st place, gold medalist(s)
Geandry Garzón	Freestyle 74 kg	—N/a	Rodríguez (DOM); W 5–2	Burroughs (CUB); L 4–15	Bronze medal contest Herrera (PER); W 11–0	3rd place, bronze medalist(s)
Yurieski Torreblanca	Freestyle 86 kg	Ramírez (PAR); W 12–0	Moore (CAN); W 10–1	Downey (USA); W 7–2	Ceballos (VEN); W 4–3	1st place, gold medalist(s)
Reineris Salas	Freestyle 97 kg	—N/a	Lacey (CRC); W 11–2	Snyder (USA); L 1–3	Bronze medal contest Ramos (PUR); W 10–0	3rd place, bronze medalist(s)
Óscar Pino	Freestyle 125 kg	—N/a	Vivenes (VEN); W 6–2	Jaoude (BRA); W 10–0	Gwiazdowski (USA); L 0–10	2nd place, silver medalist(s)
Luis Orta	Greco-Roman 60 kg	—N/a	Montaño (ECU); L 6–6	Did not advance	Bronze medal contest Palencia (VEN); W 8–0	3rd place, bronze medalist(s)
Ismael Borrero	Greco-Roman 67 kg	—N/a	de León (DOM); W 8–0	Coleman (USA); W 8–0	Villegas (VEN); W 12–0	1st place, gold medalist(s)
Yosvanys Peña	Greco-Roman 77 kg	Bye	Batista (DOM); W 6–0	Rivas (VEN); L 2–5	Bronze medal contest Moreira (BRA); W 8–0	3rd place, bronze medalist(s)
Daniel Grégorich	Greco-Roman 87 kg	Bye	Adames (DOM); W 8–0	Avendaño (VEN); L 0–4	Bronze medal contest Rau (USA); W 8–2	3rd place, bronze medalist(s)
Gabriel Rosillo	Greco-Roman 97 kg	—N/a	Pérez (VEN); W 9–0	Arias (DOM); W 8–0	Hancock (USA); W 7–2	1st place, gold medalist(s)
Mijaín López	Greco-Roman 130 kg	—N/a	Del Río (ARG); W 8–0	Acosta (CHI); W 4–0	Pérez (VEN); W 9–0	1st place, gold medalist(s)

Women

Athlete	Event	Round of 16	Quarterfinal	Semifinal	Final / BM	
Athlete	Event	Opposition Result	Opposition Result	Opposition Result	Opposition Result	Rank
Yusneylys Guzmán	50 kg	—N/a	Mallqui (PER); W 4–1	Mollocana (ECU); W 2–1	Conder (USA); L 2–10	2nd place, silver medalist(s)
Lianna Montero	53 kg	—N/a	Figueroa (COL); W 8–0	Argüello (VEN); L 1–4	Bronze medal contest Benites (PER); W 11–0	3rd place, bronze medalist(s)
Lilianet Duanes	57 kg	Rodríguez (PUR); L 6–8	Did not advance			
Yaquelin Estornell	62 kg	—N/a	Grimán (VEN); L 4–8	Did not advance		
Yudaris Sánchez	68 kg	—N/a	Di Bacco (CAN); L 2–5	Did not advance	Bronze medal contest Acosta (VEN); W 5–3	3rd place, bronze medalist(s)
Mabelkis Capote	76 kg	—N/a	Reasco (ECU); W 3–1	Ferreira (BRA); L 1–2	Bronze medal contest Cruz (PER); W 10–0	3rd place, bronze medalist(s)

== See also ==
- Cuba at the 2020 Summer Olympics
