= Boxing at the 2019 Pan American Games – Men's 69 kg =

Men's Welterweight at the 2019 Pan American Games
- Venue: Miguel Grau Coliseum
- Dates: July 28– August 1, 2019
- Competitors: 8 from 8 nations

Medalists
Gold medal	Roniel Iglesias	Cuba
Silver medal	Rohan Polanco	Dominican Republic
Bronze medal	Delante Johnson	United States
Bronze medal	Gabriel Maestre	Venezuela

The Men's welterweight competition of the boxing events at the 2019 Pan American Games in Lima, Peru, was held between the 28 of July and the 1 of August 2019 at the Miguel Grau Coliseum.

Like all Pan American boxing events, the competition is a straight single-elimination tournament. Both semifinal losers are awarded bronze medals, so no boxers compete again after their first loss. Bouts consist of a 3 rounds "10-point must" scoring system used in the pro game, where the winner of each round must be awarded 10 points and the loser a lesser amount, and the elimination of the padded headgear. Five judges scored each bout. The winner will be the boxer who scored the most at the end of the match.

== Results ==
=== Bracket ===
Quarterfinals; July 28, 2019
Roniel Iglesias (CUB)	5
Jimmy Brenes (NCA)	0
Delante Johnson (USA)	4
Alexander Rangel (COL)	1
Tyron Thomas (TRI)	0
Rohan Polanco (DOM)	5
Luis Miranda (PER)	0
Gabriel Maestre (VEN)	5

Semifinals; July 30, 2019
Roniel Iglesias (CUB)	4
Delante Johnson (USA)	1
Rohan Polanco (DOM)	5
Gabriel Maestre (VEN)	0

Final; August 1, 2019
Roniel Iglesias (CUB)	3
Rohan Polanco (DOM)	2
