= Rowing at the 2019 Pan American Games – Qualification =

The following is the qualification system and qualified countries for the Rowing at the 2019 Pan American Games competition.

== Qualification system ==
A total of 220 rowers will qualify to compete at the games. A country may only enter a maximum of 26 rowers. All qualification will be done at the 2018 Qualifier Championship (except the men's eights which will be by entry only), where a specific number of boats will qualify in each of the fourteen events.

== Qualification timeline ==
Event	Date	Venue
2018 Pan American Games Qualification Regatta	28 November – 2 December 2018	(Brazil) Rio de Janeiro

== Qualification summary ==
Nation	Men								Women						Crews	Athletes
Nation	M1x	M2x	M4x	M2-	M4-	M8+	LM2x	LM4-	W1x	W2x	W4x	W2-	LW1x	LW2x	Crews	Athletes
Argentina	X	X	X	X	X	X	X	X	X	X	X		X	X	13	26
Brazil	X	X	X	X	X	X	X	X	X	X	X	X	X	X	14	26
Bermuda									X						1	1
Canada	X	X					X		X	X		X	X	X	8	13
Chile	X	X		X	X	X	X	X	X	X	X	X	X	X	13	26
Cuba	X	X	X	X	X	X	X	X	X	X	X		X	X	13	26
El Salvador													X		1	1
Guatemala														X	1	2
Haiti									X						1	1
Mexico	X	X	X	X		X	X	X				X	X	X	10	21
Nicaragua												X			1	2
Paraguay	X	X					X		X				X		5	7
Peru	X	X					X							X	4	7
Puerto Rico	X								X						2	2
Trinidad and Tobago									X						1	1
United States	X	X		X	X	X	X		X	X	X	X			10	21
Uruguay	X	X	X			X	X						X		6	11
Venezuela	X	X													2	3
Total: 18 NOCs	12	11	5	6	5	7	10	5	10	6	5	6	9	8	110	220*

== Men's events ==
=== Single sculls ===
Competition	Quotas	Qualified
2018 Pan American Games Qualification Regatta	12	Cuba; Brazil; Chile; Argentina; Paraguay; Puerto Rico; United States; Peru; Uruguay; Venezuela; Canada; Mexico
Total	12	

=== Double sculls ===
Competition	Quotas	Qualified
2018 Pan American Games Qualification Regatta	11	Argentina; Brazil; Chile; Cuba; Mexico; United States; Paraguay; Uruguay; Venezuela; Peru; Canada
Total	11	

=== Quadruple sculls ===
Competition	Quotas	Qualified
2018 Pan American Games Qualification Regatta	5	Argentina; Mexico; Uruguay; Cuba; Brazil
Total	5	

=== Pairs ===
Competition	Quotas	Qualified
2018 Pan American Games Qualification Regatta	6	Chile; Cuba; Brazil; Argentina; Mexico; United States
Total	6	

=== Fours ===
Competition	Quotas	Qualified
2018 Pan American Games Qualification Regatta	5	Argentina; Brazil; Cuba; Chile; United States
Total	5	

=== Eights ===
Competition	Quotas	Qualified
Entry		
Total		

=== Lightweight double sculls ===
Competition	Quotas	Qualified
2018 Pan American Games Qualification Regatta	10	Mexico; Chile; Argentina; Cuba; Brazil; Peru; Canada; Uruguay; United States; Paraguay
Total	10	

=== Lightweight fours ===
Competition	Quotas	Qualified
2018 Pan American Games Qualification Regatta	5	Chile; Brazil; Cuba; Mexico; Argentina
Total	5	

== Women's events ==
=== Single sculls ===
Competition	Quotas	Qualified
2018 Pan American Games Qualification Regatta	10	United States; Argentina; Trinidad and Tobago; Bermuda; Canada; Brazil; Chile; Cuba; Paraguay; Puerto Rico
Reallocation	1	Haiti
Total	11	

=== Double sculls ===
Competition	Quotas	Qualified
2018 Pan American Games Qualification Regatta	6	Chile; Cuba; Argentina; United States; Canada; Brazil
Total	6	

=== Quadruple sculls ===
Competition	Quotas	Qualified
2018 Pan American Games Qualification Regatta	5	Chile; Argentina; Cuba; Brazil; United States
Total	5	

=== Pairs ===
Competition	Quotas	Qualified
2018 Pan American Games Qualification Regatta	6	Chile; Mexico; United States; Brazil; Canada; Nicaragua
Total	6	

=== Lightweight single sculls ===
Competition	Quotas	Qualified
2018 Pan American Games Qualification Regatta	9	Mexico; Cuba; Argentina; Chile; El Salvador; Brazil; Uruguay; Paraguay; Canada
Total	9	

=== Lightweight double sculls ===
Competition	Quotas	Qualified
2018 Pan American Games Qualification Regatta	8	Chile; Argentina; Cuba; Brazil; Mexico; Peru; Canada; Guatemala
Total	8	
