= Serrano =

Serrano may refer to:

== People ==
- Serrano people, a Native American tribe of Southern California
- Serrano language, the language spoken by the Serrano people
- Serrano (surname), people with the surname Serrano

== Places ==
- Serrano, Lecce, an Italian town
- Serrano Community in El Dorado Hills, California
- Villa Serrano, Bolivia
- Calle de Serrano, Madrid

== Ships ==
- Chilean ship Serrano, ships of the Chilean Navy
- Serrano-class destroyer, a class of Chilean warship; also the name of the lead destroyer in the class

== Other uses ==
- Serrano v. Priest, three cases regarding the financing of public schools in California
- Serrano ham, a type of dry-cured Spanish ham
- Serrano (restaurant), a chain of Tex-Mex restaurants in Iceland and Sweden
- Serrano pepper, a type of chili
- Serrano Football Club, a Brazilian football club
- Serrano Futebol Clube (PE), a Brazilian football club
- Serrano Sport Club, a Brazilian football club
- Serrano (Madrid Metro), a station on Line 4
- Los Serrano, a Spanish television drama comedy
- Serrano, a series of novels by Elizabeth Moon set in the fictional Familias Regnant universe
- Serrano, code name for the Samsung Galaxy S4 Mini
