= Boxing at the 2019 Pan American Games – Men's 91 kg =

Men's Heavyweight at the 2019 Pan American Games
- Venue: Miguel Grau Coliseum
- Dates: July 28– August 2, 2019
- Competitors: 8 from 8 nations

Medalists
Gold medal	Erislandy Savón	Cuba
Silver medal	Julio Castillo	Ecuador
Bronze medal	Abner Teixeira	Brazil
Bronze medal	José María Lúcar	Peru

The Men's heavyweight competition of the boxing events at the 2019 Pan American Games in Lima, Peru, was held between the 28 of July and the 2 of August 2019 at the Miguel Grau Coliseum.

Like all Pan American boxing events, the competition is a straight single-elimination tournament. Both semifinal losers are awarded bronze medals, so no boxers compete again after their first loss. Bouts consist of a 3 rounds "10-point must" scoring system used in the pro game, where the winner of each round must be awarded 10 points and the loser a lesser amount, and the elimination of the padded headgear. Five judges scored each bout. The winner will be the boxer who scored the most at the end of the match.

== Results ==
=== Bracket ===
Quarterfinals; July 28, 2019
Erislandy Savón (CUB)	5
Bryan Colwell (CAN)	0
Abner Teixeira (BRA)	5
Joaquín Berroa (DOM)	0
José María Lúcar (PER)	5
Francisco Cantabrana (MEX)	0
Julio Castillo (ECU)	3
Deivi Julio (COL)	2

Semifinals; July 30, 2019
Erislandy Savón (CUB)	3
Abner Teixeira (BRA)	2
José María Lúcar (PER)	0
Julio Castillo (ECU)	5

Final; August 2, 2019
Erislandy Savón (CUB)	4
Julio Castillo (ECU)	1
