= Pedro Serrano =

Pedro Serrano may refer to:

- Pedro Serrano (sailor), supposedly marooned in the Americas during the 16th century
- Pedro Serrano (police officer), fought against a quota system in the New York City Police Department
- Pedro Serrano (weightlifter) (born 1931), Puerto Rican Olympic weightlifter
- Pedro Julio Serrano (born 1974), human rights activist
