= Serano =

Serano is a surname. Notable people with the surname include:

- Julia Serano (b. 1967), transgender American writer, performer, activist, and biologist
- Greg Serano (b. 1972), American actor
- Tommy Serano, German DJ, producer/remixer
- Carmen Serano (b. 1973), a Hispanic American actress

== See also ==
- Serrano
