= Basque pelota at the 2019 Pan American Games – Women's individual Peruvian fronton =

Basque pelota – Women's individual Peruvian fronton at the 2019 Pan American Games
- Venue: Villa María del Triunfo Center
- Dates: 4–10 August
- Competitors: 5 from 5 nations

Medalists
| Gold medal | Claudia Suárez | Peru |
| Silver medal | Wendy Durán | Cuba |
| Bronze medal | Melina Spahn | Argentina |

The women's individual Peruvian fronton basque pelota event at the 2019 Pan American Games was held from 4–10 August at the Basque pelota courts in the Villa María del Triunfo Sports Center in Lima, Peru. Claudia Suárez won the gold medal, after defeating Wendy Durán in the final.

== Results ==
=== Preliminary round ===
The preliminary stage consisted of 5 competitors where everybody played each other once. At the end of this stage, the top 4 competitors advanced to the medal round.

| Pos | Team | Pld | W | L | PF | PA | PD | Pts |
|---|---|---|---|---|---|---|---|---|
| 1 | Peru Claudia Suárez | 4 | 4 | 0 | 120 | 56 | +64 | 12 |
| 2 | Cuba Wendy Durán | 4 | 3 | 1 | 106 | 82 | +24 | 10 |
| 3 | Venezuela Diana Rangel | 4 | 2 | 2 | 103 | 113 | −10 | 8 |
| 4 | Argentina Melina Spahn | 4 | 1 | 3 | 101 | 104 | −3 | 6 |
| 5 | Chile Rosario Valderrama | 4 | 0 | 4 | 45 | 120 | −75 | 4 |

Updated to match(es) played on 18 September 2019. Source: Lima 2019

All times are local (UTC-5)

| 4 August; 12:30 | Melina Spahn (Argentina) | 2–0 | (Chile) Rosario Valderrama | Villa María del Triunfo Sports Center; Referees: Enrique Manuel Benavides Guadalupe (PER) |
| 4 August; 12:30 | (15–4, 15–7); Report | | | Villa María del Triunfo Sports Center; Referees: Enrique Manuel Benavides Guadalupe (PER) |

| 4 August; 12:32 | Claudia Suárez (Peru) | 2–0 | (Cuba) Wendy Durán | Villa María del Triunfo Sports Center; Referees: Jorge Enrique Carpio León (PER) |
| 4 August; 12:32 | (15–6, 15–10); Report | | | Villa María del Triunfo Sports Center; Referees: Jorge Enrique Carpio León (PER) |

| 5 August; 12:01 | Wendy Durán (Cuba) | 2–0 | (Venezuela) Diana Rangel | Villa María del Triunfo Sports Center; Referees: Diego Gonzalo Tang Voysest (PER) |
| 5 August; 12:01 | (15–14, 15–11); Report | | | Villa María del Triunfo Sports Center; Referees: Diego Gonzalo Tang Voysest (PER) |

| 5 August; 12:03 | Claudia Suárez (Peru) | 2–0 | (Argentina) Melina Spahn | Villa María del Triunfo Sports Center; Referees: Enrique Manuel Benavides Guadalupe (PER) |
| 5 August; 12:03 | (15–9, 15–8); Report | | | Villa María del Triunfo Sports Center; Referees: Enrique Manuel Benavides Guadalupe (PER) |

| 6 August; 12:39 | Rosario Valderrama (Chile) | 0-2 | (Cuba) Wendy Durán | Villa María del Triunfo Sports Center; Referees: Diego Gonzalo Tang Voysest (PER) |
| 6 August; 12:39 | (2-15, 5-15); Report | | | Villa María del Triunfo Sports Center; Referees: Diego Gonzalo Tang Voysest (PER) |

| 6 August; 12:40 | Diana Rangel (Venezuela) | 0-2 | (Peru) Claudia Suárez | Villa María del Triunfo Sports Center; Referees: Enrique Manuel Benavides Guadalupe (PER) |
| 6 August; 12:40 | (9-15, 6-15); Report | | | Villa María del Triunfo Sports Center; Referees: Enrique Manuel Benavides Guadalupe (PER) |

| 7 August; 12:46 | Claudia Suárez (Peru) | 2-0 | (Chile) Rosario Valderrama | Villa María del Triunfo Sports Center; Referees: Jorge Enrique Carpio León (PER) |
| 7 August; 12:46 | (15-5, 15-3); Report | | | Villa María del Triunfo Sports Center; Referees: Jorge Enrique Carpio León (PER) |

| 7 August; 13:06 | Melina Spahn (Argentina) | 1-2 | (Venezuela) Diana Rangel | Villa María del Triunfo Sports Center; Referees: Diego Gonzalo Tang Voysest (PER) |
| 7 August; 13:06 | (14-15, 15-8, 5-10); Report | | | Villa María del Triunfo Sports Center; Referees: Diego Gonzalo Tang Voysest (PER) |

| 8 August; 12:01 | Wendy Durán (Cuba) | 2-0 | (Argentina) Melina Spahn | Villa María del Triunfo Sports Center; Referees: Enrique Manuel Benavides Guadalupe (PER) |
| 8 August; 12:01 | (15-8, 15-12); Report | | | Villa María del Triunfo Sports Center; Referees: Enrique Manuel Benavides Guadalupe (PER) |

| 8 August; 12:02 | Rosario Valderrama (Chile) | 0-2 | (Venezuela) Diana Rangel | Villa María del Triunfo Sports Center; Referees: Diego Gonzalo Tang Voysest (PER) |
| 8 August; 12:02 | (12-15, 7-15); Report | | | Villa María del Triunfo Sports Center; Referees: Diego Gonzalo Tang Voysest (PER) |

=== Bronze medal match ===
| 9 August; 12:00 | Diana Rangel (Venezuela) | 1-2 | (Argentina) Melina Spahn | Villa María del Triunfo Sports Center; Referees: Adolfo Javier Artadi Tryon (PER) |
| 9 August; 12:00 | (12-15, 15-5, 9-10); Report | | | Villa María del Triunfo Sports Center; Referees: Adolfo Javier Artadi Tryon (PER) |

=== Gold medal match ===
| 10 August; 13:00 | Claudia Suárez (Peru) | 2-0 | (Cuba) Wendy Durán | Villa María del Triunfo Sports Center; Referees: Jorge Enrique Carpio León (PER) |
| 10 August; 13:00 | (15-4, 15-14); Report | | | Villa María del Triunfo Sports Center; Referees: Jorge Enrique Carpio León (PER) |
