= Canoeing at the 2019 Pan American Games – Men's C-2 1000 metres =

Men's C-1 1000 metres at the 2019 Pan American Games
- Venue: Albufera Medio Mundo
- Dates: July 27
- Competitors: 12 from 6 nations
- Winning time: 3:32.276

Medalists
Gold medal	Serguey Torres; Fernando Jorge	Cuba
Silver medal	Craig Spence; Drew Hodges	Canada
Bronze medal	Guillermo Quirino; Rigoberto Camilo	Mexico

The men's C-2 1000 metres canoeing event at the 2019 Pan American Games was held on 27th of July at the Albufera Medio Mundo in the city of Huacho.

== Results ==
=== Final ===
Rank	Athletes	Country	Time
1st place, gold medalist(s)	Serguey Torres; Fernando Jorge	Cuba	3:32.276
2nd place, silver medalist(s)	Craig Spence; Drew Hodges	Canada	3:35.646
3rd place, bronze medalist(s)	Guillermo Quirino; Rigoberto Camilo	Mexico	3:37.726
4	Edward Paredes; Jose Solano	Venezuela	3:56.523
5	Daniel Leon; Cristhian Sola	Ecuador	4:21.378
–	Erlon de Souza Silva; Isaquias Queiroz	Brazil	DNF
