= Cosmos Redshift 7 =

Galaxy in the constellation Sextans

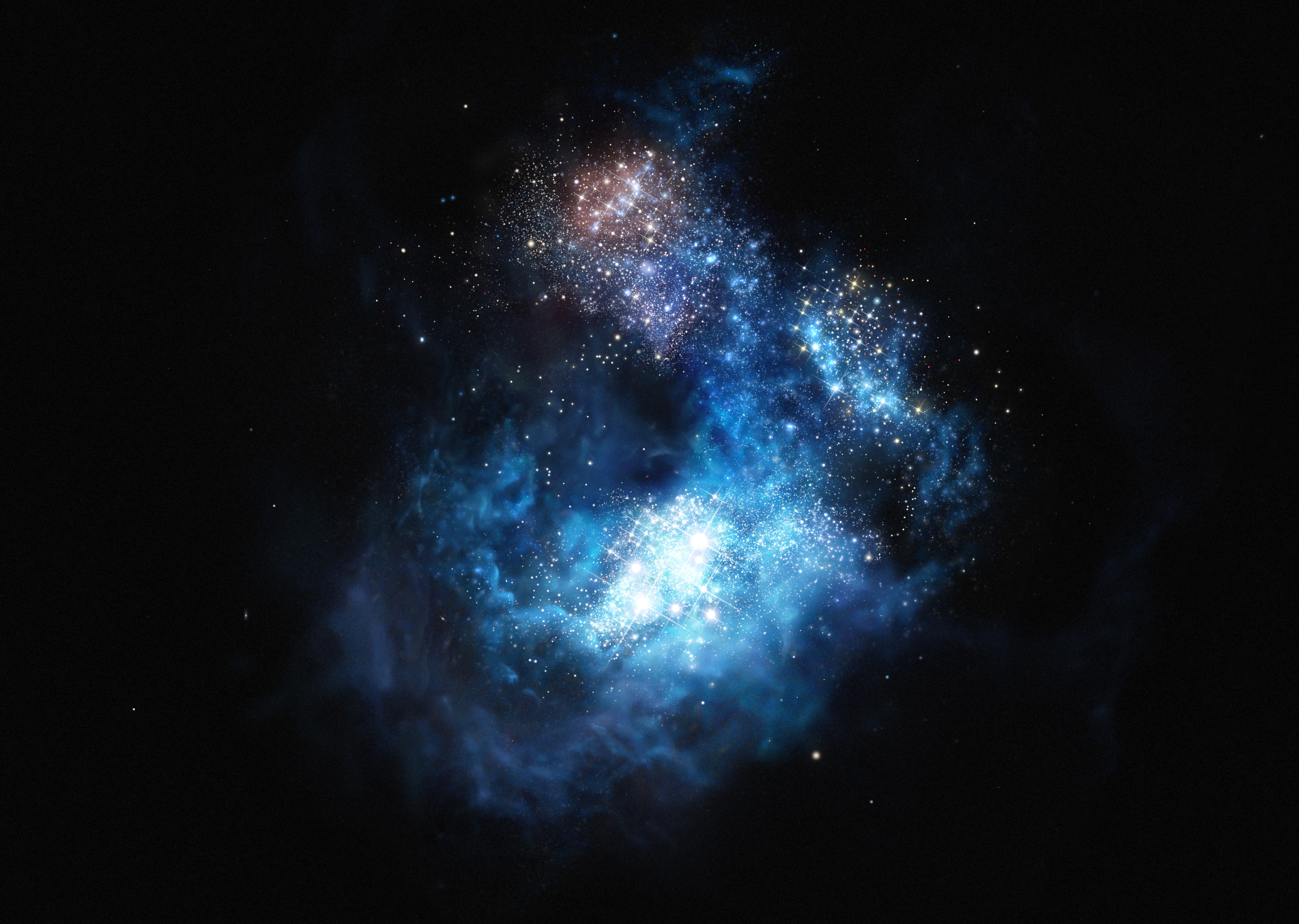
- Artist's impression of CR7

Observation data (Reionization epoch)
- Constellation: Sextans
- Right ascension: 10^{h} 00^{m} 58.005^{s}
- Declination: +01° 48′ 15.251″
- Redshift: 6.604
- Distance: 12.9 billion light-years (Light travel distance)

Characteristics
- Type: Lyman-alpha emitter
- Notable features: Galaxy Cosmos Redshift 7 is reported to be three times brighter than the brightest distant galaxy known up to the time of its discovery and to contain some of the earliest first stars that produced the chemical elements needed for the later formation of planets and life as it is known.

Other designations
- COSMOS Redshift 7; Galaxy Cosmos Redshift 7; Galaxy CR7; CR7, SMD2015 CR7

Cosmos Redshift 7 (also known as COSMOS Redshift 7, Galaxy Cosmos Redshift 7, Galaxy CR7 or CR7) is a high-redshift Lyman-alpha emitter galaxy. At a redshift z = 6.6, the galaxy is observed as it was about 800 million years after the Big Bang, during the epoch of reionisation. With a light travel time of 12.9 billion years, it is one of the oldest, most distant galaxies known.

CR7 shows some of the expected signatures of Population III stars i.e. the first generation of stars produced during early galaxy formation. These signatures were detected in a bright pocket of blue stars; the rest of the galaxy contains redder Population II stars. However, recent studies show no evidence for Population III stars in CR7.

== Description ==
Galaxy Cosmos Redshift 7 contains old Population II (metal-poor) and possibly Population III (stars with extremely poor metallicity), according to astronomers, and is three times brighter than the brightest distant galaxies (redshift, z > 6) detected up to the time of its discovery.

== Discovery ==
Astronomers led by David Sobral, a Reader in Astrophysics at the University of Lancaster, used the Very Large Telescope (VLT) at the European Southern Observatory—with help from the W. M. Keck Observatory, Subaru Telescope and the NASA/ESA Hubble Space Telescope—made the discovery. The research team included members of the University of California, Riverside, University of Geneva, University of Leiden and University of Lisbon. The name of the galaxy (Cosmos Redshift 7 Galaxy) was inspired by football player Cristiano Ronaldo, also popularly known as CR7.

== See also ==
- Galaxy formation and evolution
- List of galaxies
- Star formation
- Stellar evolution
