= Basque pelota at the 2019 Pan American Games – Women's doubles fronton rubber ball =

Basque pelota – women's doubles fronton rubber ball at the 2019 Pan American Games
- Venue: Villa María del Triunfo Center
- Dates: 4–10 August
- Competitors: 10 from 5 nations

Medalists
Gold medal	Dulce Figueroa; Laura Puentes	Mexico
Silver medal	Yasmary Medina; Daniela Darriba	Cuba
Bronze medal	Sabrina Andrade Blason; Melina Spahn	Argentina

The women's doubles fronton rubber ball basque pelota event at the 2019 Pan American Games was held from 4–10 August at the Basque pelota courts in the Villa María del Triunfo Sports Center in Lima, Peru. The Mexican team won the gold medal, after defeating Cuba in the final.

== Results ==
=== Preliminary round ===
The preliminary stage consisted of a single round robin group where every doubles team played each other once. At the end of this stage, the first two teams then played a final match for the gold medal, while the third and fourth played for bronze.

Pos	Team	Pld	W	L	PF	PA	PD	Pts
1	Mexico Dulce Figueroa Laura Puentes	4	4	0	120	31	+89	12
2	Cuba Yasmary Medina Daniela Darriba	4	3	1	107	66	+41	10
3	Argentina Sabrina Andrade Blason Melina Spahn	4	2	2	92	82	+10	8
4	Peru Jessenia Bernal Arévalo Mia Rodríguez	4	1	3	54	93	−39	6
5	Chile Julieta Domínguez Maritxu Bastarrica	4	0	4	19	120	−101	4

Updated to match(es) played on 20 September 2019. Source: Lima 2019

All times are local (UTC−5)

4 August; 14:07	Andrade Blason – Spahn (Argentina)	0-2	(Mexico) Figueroa – Puentes	Villa María del Triunfo Sports Center; Referees: Rolando Antonio Casteleiro (CUB)
4 August; 14:07	(2-15, 5-15); Report			Villa María del Triunfo Sports Center; Referees: Rolando Antonio Casteleiro (CUB)

4 August; 14:53	Medina – Darriba (Cuba)	2-0	(Chile) Domínguez – Bastarrica	Villa María del Triunfo Sports Center; Referees: Jorge Luis Balbi (ARG)
4 August; 14:53	(15-1, 15-3); Report			Villa María del Triunfo Sports Center; Referees: Jorge Luis Balbi (ARG)

5 August; 14:04	Andrade Blason – Spahn (Argentina)	1-2	(Cuba) Medina – Darriba	Villa María del Triunfo Sports Center; Referees: Pedro López (MEX)
5 August; 14:04	(15-6, 8-15, 2-10); Report			Villa María del Triunfo Sports Center; Referees: Pedro López (MEX)

5 August; 15:30	Figueroa – Puentes (Mexico)	2-0	(Peru) Bernal Arévalo – Rodríguez	Villa María del Triunfo Sports Center; Referees: Jorge Luis Balbi (ARG)
5 August; 15:30	(15-3, 15-3); Report			Villa María del Triunfo Sports Center; Referees: Jorge Luis Balbi (ARG)

6 August; 17:06	Domínguez – Bastarrica (Chile)	0-2	(Mexico) Figueroa – Puentes	Villa María del Triunfo Sports Center; Referees: Dardo Heber Ferreira (URU)
6 August; 17:06	(1-15, 1-15); Report			Villa María del Triunfo Sports Center; Referees: Dardo Heber Ferreira (URU)

6 August; 17:41	Bernal Arévalo – Rodríguez (Peru)	0-2	(Argentina) Andrade Blason – Spahn	Villa María del Triunfo Sports Center; Referees: Dardo Heber Ferreira (URU)
6 August; 17:41	(6-15, 5-15); Report			Villa María del Triunfo Sports Center; Referees: Dardo Heber Ferreira (URU)

7 August; 16:38	Andrade Blason – Spahn (Argentina)	2-0	(Chile) Domínguez – Bastarrica	Villa María del Triunfo Sports Center; Referees: Dardo Heber Ferreira (URU)
7 August; 16:38	(15-3, 15-7); Report			Villa María del Triunfo Sports Center; Referees: Dardo Heber Ferreira (URU)

7 August; 17:10	Medina – Darriba (Cuba)	2-0	(Peru) Bernal Arévalo – Rodríguez	Villa María del Triunfo Sports Center; Referees: Leonardo Gabrie Mondada (URU)
7 August; 17:10	(15-2, 15-5); Report			Villa María del Triunfo Sports Center; Referees: Leonardo Gabrie Mondada (URU)

8 August; 14:02	Figueroa – Puentes (Mexico)	2-0	(Cuba) Medina – Darriba	Villa María del Triunfo Sports Center; Referees: Alfonso Franco Romero (CHI)
8 August; 14:02	(15-13, 15-3); Report			Villa María del Triunfo Sports Center; Referees: Alfonso Franco Romero (CHI)

8 August; 15:08	Domínguez – Bastarrica (Chile)	0-2	(Peru) Bernal Arévalo – Rodríguez	Villa María del Triunfo Sports Center; Referees: Leonardo Gabrie Mondada (URU)
8 August; 15:08	(1-15, 2-15); Report			Villa María del Triunfo Sports Center; Referees: Leonardo Gabrie Mondada (URU)

=== Bronze medal match ===
9 August; 15:22	Andrade Blason – Spahn (Argentina)	2-0	(Peru) Bernal Arévalo – Rodríguez	Villa María del Triunfo Sports Center; Referees: Andrés Emilio Caballero (CUB)
9 August; 15:22	(15-0, 15-2); Report			Villa María del Triunfo Sports Center; Referees: Andrés Emilio Caballero (CUB)

=== Gold medal match ===
10 August; 11:38	Figueroa – Puentes (Mexico)	2-0	(Cuba) Medina – Darriba	Villa María del Triunfo Sports Center; Referees: Alfonso Franco Romero (CHI)
10 August; 11:38	(15-4, 15-7); Report			Villa María del Triunfo Sports Center; Referees: Alfonso Franco Romero (CHI)
