= Canoeing at the 2019 Pan American Games – Men's C-1 1000 metres =

Men's C-1 1000 metres at the 2019 Pan American Games
- Venue: Albufera Medio Mundo
- Dates: July 29
- Competitors: 11 from 11 nations
- Winning time: 3:47.631

Medalists
| Gold medal | Isaquias Queiroz | Brazil |
| Silver medal | Fernando Jorge | Cuba |
| Bronze medal | Drew Hodges | Canada |

The men's C-1 1000 metres canoeing event at the 2019 Pan American Games was held between the 27 and 29 of July at the Albufera Medio Mundo in the city of Huacho.

== Results ==
=== Heats ===
Qualification Rules: 1..2->Final, 3..6->Semifinals, Rest Out

==== Heat 1 ====
| Rank | Athletes | Country | Time | Notes |
|---|---|---|---|---|
| 1 | Fernando Jorge | Cuba | 4.09.311 | F |
| 2 | Drew Hodges | Canada | 4.13.796 | F |
| 3 | Ian Ross | United States | 4.31.018 | SF |
| 4 | Cristhian Sola | Ecuador | 4.33.588 | SF |
| 5 | Ariel Jimenez | Dominican Republic | 4.39.213 | SF |
| 6 | Edward Parades | Venezuela | 4.43.873 | SF |

==== Heat 2 ====
| Rank | Athletes | Country | Time | Notes |
|---|---|---|---|---|
| 1 | Isaquias Queiroz | Brazil | 4.00.985 | F |
| 2 | Everardo Cristóbal | Mexico | 4.01.627 | F |
| 3 | Luciano Mendez | Argentina | 4.10.985 | SF |
| 4 | Nicolas Vergara | Chile | 4.28.820 | SF |
| 5 | Beldin Gaona | Peru | 4.49.417 | SF |

=== Semifinal ===
Qualification Rules: 1..4->Final, Rest Out

| Rank | Athletes | Country | Time | Notes |
|---|---|---|---|---|
| 1 | Luciano Mendez | Argentina | 4:10.009 | F |
| 2 | Nicolas Vergara | Chile | 4:19.254 | F |
| 3 | Ian Ross | United States | 4:21.859 | F |
| 4 | Edward Parades | Venezuela | 4:27.53 | F |
| 5 | Cristhian Sola | Ecuador | 4:29.466 | |
| 6 | Ariel Jimenez | Dominican Republic | 4:43.509 | |
| 7 | Beldin Gaona | Peru | 4:49.104 | |

=== Final ===
| Rank | Athletes | Country | Time | Notes |
|---|---|---|---|---|
| 1st place, gold medalist(s) | Isaquias Queiroz | Brazil | 3:47.631 | |
| 2nd place, silver medalist(s) | Fernando Jorge | Cuba | 3:48.574 | |
| 3rd place, bronze medalist(s) | Drew Hodges | Canada | 3:58.454 | |
| 4 | Everardo Cristóbal | Mexico | 4:03.689 | |
| 5 | Edward Parades | Venezuela | 4:09.201 | |
| 6 | Luciano Mendez | Argentina | 4:11.414 | |
| 7 | Ian Ross | United States | 4:16.371 | |
| 8 | Nicolas Vergara | Chile | 4:28.971 | |
