= Basque pelota at the 2019 Pan American Games – Women's doubles frontenis =

Basque pelota – women's doubles frontenis at the 2019 Pan American Games
- Venue: Villa María del Triunfo Center
- Dates: 4–10 August
- Competitors: 12 from 6 nations

Medalists
Gold medal	Guadalupe Hernandez; Ariana Ceped Mora	Mexico
Silver medal	Yasmary Medina; Leyanis Castillo	Cuba
Bronze medal	Nathaly Paredes; Mia Rodríguez	Peru

The women's doubles frontenis basque pelota event at the 2019 Pan American Games was held from 4–10 August at the Basque pelota courts in the Villa María del Triunfo Sports Center in Lima, Peru. The Mexican team won the gold medal, after defeating Cuba in the final.

== Results ==
=== Preliminary round ===
The preliminary stage consisted of 2 pools, where every team played the other 2 teams in the same group once. At the end of this stage, the first four teams played in the semifinals and then the winning two played a final match for the gold medal, while the losing two teams played for bronze.

==== Pool A ====
Pos	Team	Pld	W	L	PF	PA	PD	Pts
1	Mexico Guadalupe Hernandez Ariana Ceped Mora	2	2	0	60	13	+47	6
2	Argentina Lucila Busson Irina Podversich	2	1	1	39	62	−23	4
3	Venezuela Maria Borges Vega Diana Rangel	2	0	2	40	64	−24	2

Updated to match(es) played on 20 September 2019. Source: Lima 2019

All times are local (UTC−5)

4 August; 11:41	Hernandez – Ceped Mora (Mexico)	2–0	(Argentina) Busson – Podversich	Villa María del Triunfo Sports Center; Referees: Andrés Emilio Caballero (CUB)
4 August; 11:41	(15-2, 15-3); Report			Villa María del Triunfo Sports Center; Referees: Andrés Emilio Caballero (CUB)

5 August; 9:02	Hernandez – Ceped Mora (Mexico)	2–0	(Venezuela) Borges Vega – Rangel	Villa María del Triunfo Sports Center; Referees: Rolando Antonio Casteleiro (CUB)
5 August; 9:02	(15-4, 15-4); Report			Villa María del Triunfo Sports Center; Referees: Rolando Antonio Casteleiro (CUB)

6 August; 10:55	Busson – Podversich (Argentina)	2–1	(Venezuela) Borges Vega – Rangel	Villa María del Triunfo Sports Center; Referees: Andrés Emilio Caballero (CUB)
6 August; 10:55	(9-15, 15-9, 10-8); Report			Villa María del Triunfo Sports Center; Referees: Andrés Emilio Caballero (CUB)

==== Pool B ====
Pos	Team	Pld	W	L	PF	PA	PD	Pts
1	Cuba Yasmary Medina Leyanis Castillo	2	2	0	60	22	+38	6
2	Peru Nathaly Paredes Mia Rodríguez	2	1	1	49	65	−16	4
3	Chile Magdalena Muñoz Natalia Bozzo	2	0	2	43	65	−22	2

Updated to match(es) played on 20 September 2019. Source: Lima 2019

All times are local (UTC−5)

4 August; 12:22	Medina – Castillo (Cuba)	2–0	(Chile) Muñoz – Bozzo	Villa María del Triunfo Sports Center; Referees: Jorge Luis Balbi (ARG)
4 August; 12:22	(15-2, 15-6); Report			Villa María del Triunfo Sports Center; Referees: Jorge Luis Balbi (ARG)

5 August; 9:49	Medina – Castillo (Cuba)	2–0	(Peru) Paredes – Rodríguez	Villa María del Triunfo Sports Center; Referees: Leonardo Gabrie Mondada (URU)
5 August; 9:49	(15-3, 15-11); Report			Villa María del Triunfo Sports Center; Referees: Leonardo Gabrie Mondada (URU)

6 August; 12:25	Muñoz – Bozzo (Chile)	1-2	(Peru) Paredes – Rodríguez	Villa María del Triunfo Sports Center; Referees: Rolando Antonio Casteleiro (CUB)
6 August; 12:25	(12-15, 15-10, 8-10); Report			Villa María del Triunfo Sports Center; Referees: Rolando Antonio Casteleiro (CUB)

=== Semifinals ===
7 August; 12:00	Hernandez – Ceped Mora (Mexico)	2-0	(Peru) Paredes – Rodríguez	Villa María del Triunfo Sports Center; Referees: Jorge Luis Balbi (ARG)
7 August; 12:00	(15-1, 15-1); Report			Villa María del Triunfo Sports Center; Referees: Jorge Luis Balbi (ARG)

7 August; 12:29	Medina – Castillo (Cuba)	2-0	(Argentina) Busson – Podversich	Villa María del Triunfo Sports Center; Referees: Roberto Andrés Jara (CHI)
7 August; 12:29	(15-6, 15-8); Report			Villa María del Triunfo Sports Center; Referees: Roberto Andrés Jara (CHI)

=== Bronze medal match ===
9 August; 9:03	Paredes – Rodríguez (Peru)	2-0	(Argentina) Busson – Podversich	Villa María del Triunfo Sports Center; Referees: Alfonso Franco Romero (CHI)
9 August; 9:03	(15-11, 15-12); Report			Villa María del Triunfo Sports Center; Referees: Alfonso Franco Romero (CHI)

=== Gold medal match ===
10 August; 9:02	Hernandez – Ceped Mora (Mexico)	2-0	(Cuba) Medina – Castillo	Villa María del Triunfo Sports Center; Referees: Jorge Luis Balbi (ARG)
10 August; 9:02	(15-0, 15-5); Report			Villa María del Triunfo Sports Center; Referees: Jorge Luis Balbi (ARG)
