= Chilean ship Serrano =

Serrano is the name of the following ships of the Chilean Navy:

- Chilean ship Serrano (APD-26), ex-USS Odum, launched in 1944, in service with Chile 1966–1984
- Chilean destroyer Serrano (1928), lead Serrano-class destroyer, in commission 1928–1962

== See also ==
- Chilean destroyer Teniente Serrano
- Teniente Serrano (LM-38), a Tiger-class fast attack craft
- Serrano (disambiguation)
