= David Sobral =

Portuguese astrophysicist

- Born: David Ricardo Serrano Gonçalves Sobral; 11 February 1986 (age 40); Barreiro, Portugal
- Citizenship: Portuguese
- Education: University of Lisbon; University of Edinburgh
- Known for: Discovery of Cosmos Redshift 7
- Scientific career
- Fields: Extragalactic astronomy

David Ricardo Serrano Gonçalves Sobral (born 11 February 1986) is a Portuguese astrophysicist, best known for the discovery of galaxy CR-7. He was an astrophysics lecturer and Reader at Lancaster University from January 2016 to August 2022.

== Publications ==
- A large H alpha survey at z=2.23, 1.47, 0.84 and 0.40: the 11 Gyr evolution of star-forming galaxies from HiZELS, Monthly Notices of the Royal Astronomical Society in 2013
- Evidence for PopIII-like stellar populations in the most luminous Lyα emitters at the epoch of reionization: spectroscopic confirmation, The Astrophysical Journal 808 (2)
- Chasing a Starlight: Investigating One of the Oldest Known Galaxies with MUSE
