= José María Lúcar =

Peruvian boxer (born 1992)

Personal information
- Born: 11 September 1992 (age 33) Lima, Peru

Sport
- Sport: Boxing
Medal record
Representing Peru
Pan American Games
Bronze medal – third place	2019 Lima	Heavyweight

José María Lúcar (born 11 September 1992) is a Peruvian boxer. He competed in the men's heavyweight event at the 2020 Summer Olympics.
