= Milena Venega =

Cuban rower (born 1997)

Personal information
- Full name: Milena Venega Cancio
- Born: 5 March 1997 (age 29) Jatibonico, Cuba

Sport
- Country: Cuba
Medal record
Pan American Games
Bronze medal – third place	2019 Lima	Lightweight single sculls
Bronze medal – third place	2019 Lima	Lightweight double sculls
Bronze medal – third place	2023 Santiago	Mixed eight

Milena Venega Cancio (Note: In this Spanish name, the first or paternal surname is Venega and the second or maternal family name is Cancio.) (born 5 March 1997) is a Cuban rower.

Venega competed at the Pan American Games in 2019, where she won bronze medals in the lightweight single sculls event and the lightweight double sculls event alongside Rosana Serrano, and in 2023, where she won a bronze medal in the mixed eight event.

She competed at the 2020 Summer Olympics.
