= Serrano, Lecce =

Town in Apulia, Italy

Coordinates: 40°11′N 18°21′E

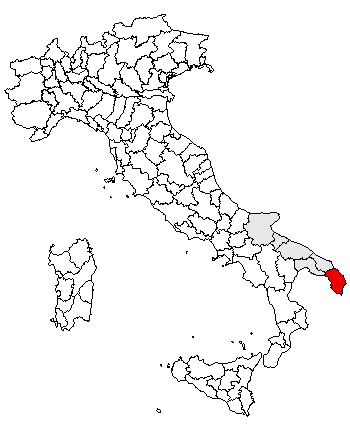
Location of the province of Lecce

Serrano is a town in the Province of Lecce, in Apulia, southern Italy. It is a frazione (subdivision) of Carpignano Salentino comune and is 13 km from Otranto and 29 from Lecce province.

The 2021 census recorded 1,169 residents. The population of the town has been in decline since at least 2001.

== Gallery ==
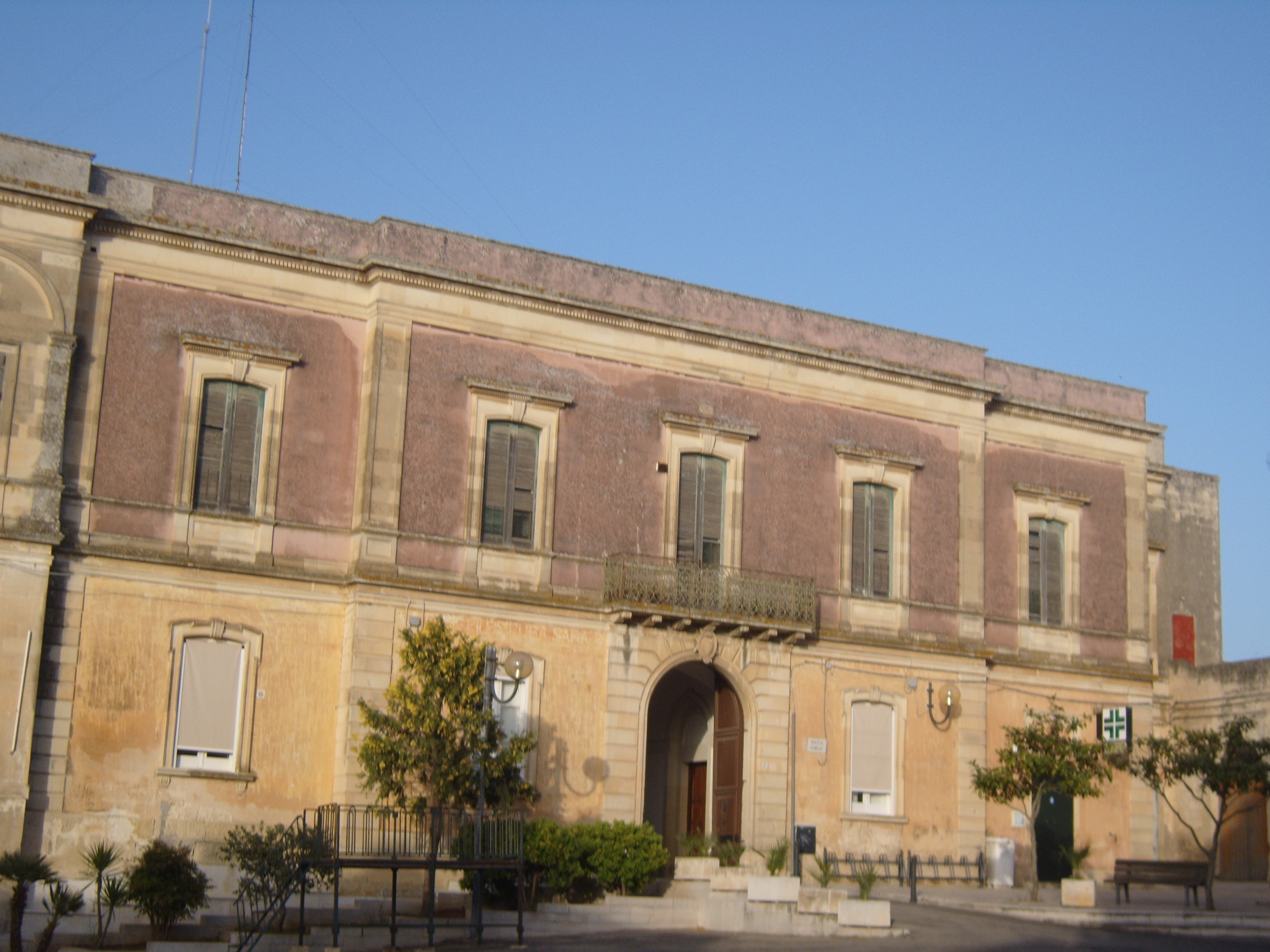
Lubelli palace in Lubelli square

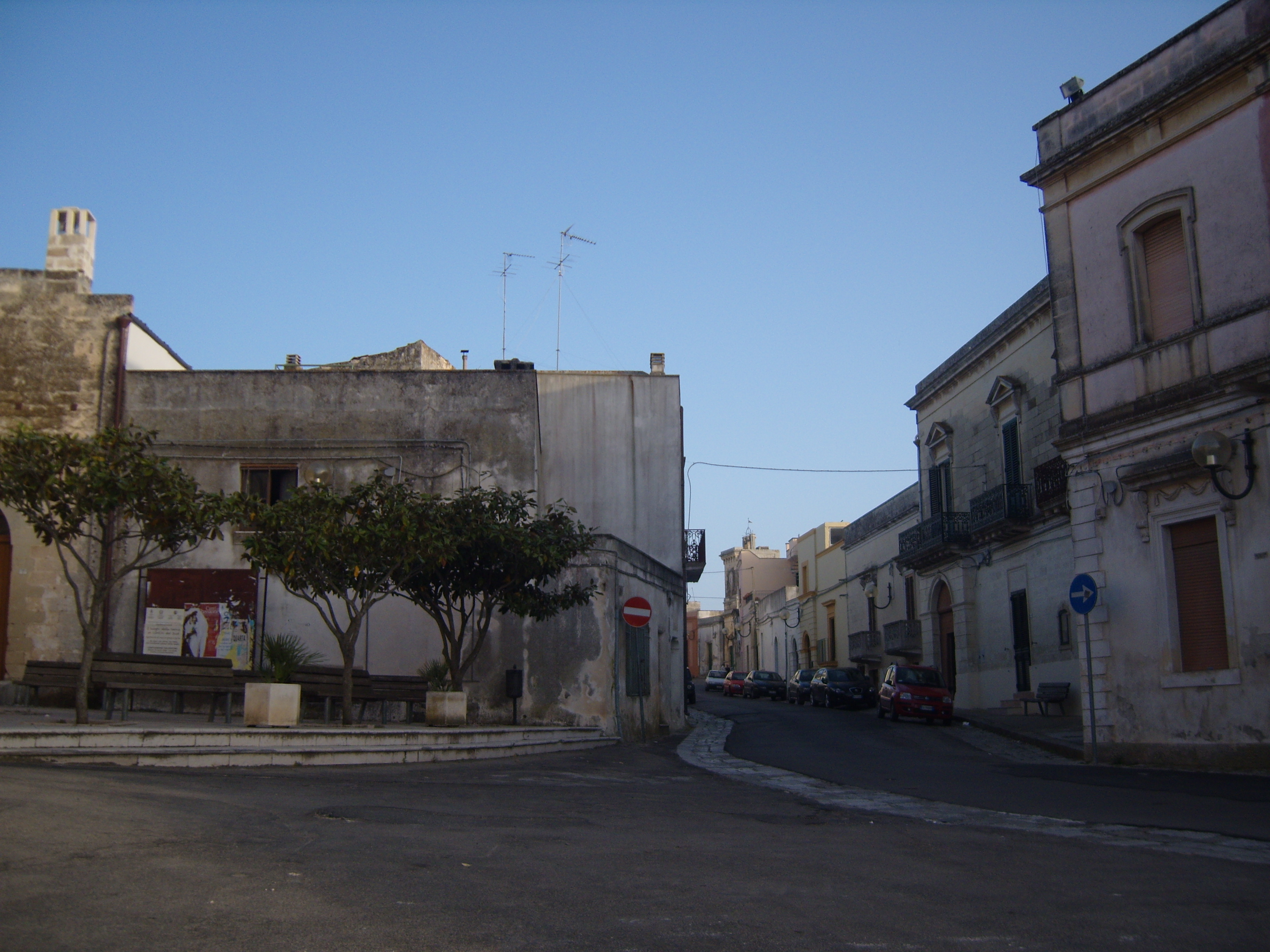
Lubelli square

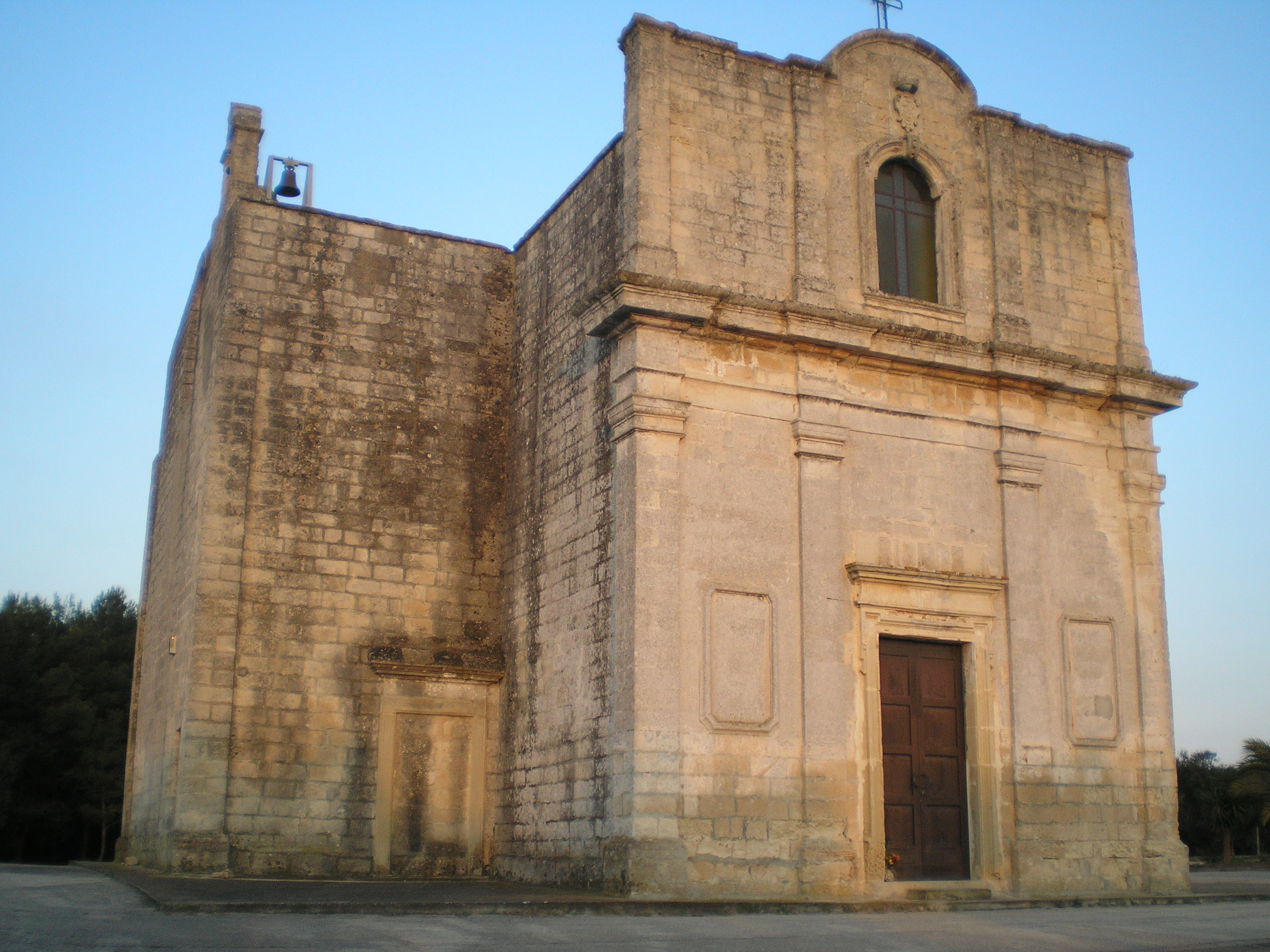
Byzantine church of Santa Marina in Stigliano, in the outlying area of Carpignano Salentino
