= Antonio Serrano (footballer) =

Peruvian footballer (born 1979)

Personal information
- Full name: Antonio Serrano Dávila
- Date of birth: 14 March 1979 (age 47)
- Place of birth: Saposoa, Peru
- Height: 1.80 m (5 ft 11 in)
- Position: Forward

Senior career*
Years	Team	Apps	(Gls)
1996–1997	San Agustín		
1998–1999	Deportivo UPAO	64	(40)
2000–2001	FAS	51	(21)
2002	Sport Boys	36	(18)
2003	Alianza Lima	13	(1)
2004	FAS		
2004	Atlético Universidad		
2004	USMP	16	(3)
2005	FBC Melgar	36	(10)
2006	José Gálvez	1	(0)
2006	Universitario	1	(0)
2007	Xiangxue Sun Hei	4	(2)
2008	Juan Aurich	9	(0)
2008	Inti Gas Deportes	2	(2)
2009	Sport Ancash	34	(11)
2010	Total Chalaco	11	(2)
2010	José Gálvez	2	(0)
2011	Real Garcilaso	6	(3)
2012	Cobresol	12	(7)
2012	Real Garcilaso	4	(0)
2013	Defensor San Alejandro	12	(3)
2013	Sport Huancayo	5	(0)

International career
2003	Peru	1	(1)
- * Club domestic league appearances and goals

Antonio Serrano Dávila (born 14 March 1979) is a Peruvian former professional footballer who played as a forward.

== Club career ==
Serrano started his career playing for Deportivo San Agustín in the 1996 Descentralizado season under manager Oscar Hamada. However San Agustín finished in last place at the end of the season and was relegated to the Segunda División Peruana (Second Division). He then played in the 1997 Segunda División season, but his club was further relegated at the end of the year.

The next season, he played for Copa Perú side Deportivo UPAO. In his second season there, Serrano helped the club reach promotion to the top-flight by winning the 1999 Copa Perú title.

From 2000–2001 he had his first experience abroad playing for El Salvador club C.D. FAS.

He returned to Peru in 2002 to play for Sport Boys first under manager Ramón Mifflin and later with Jorge Sampaoli. Serrano had one of his best seasons with the Chalacos as he managed to score 18 goals for them in the 2002 Descentralizado.

In January 2003 Serrano joined Alianza Lima.

In March 2007, Serrano joined Xiangxue Sun Hei in Hong Kong First Division League. He made four appearances in total and scored two goals, both against Hong Kong 08 on 6 April 2007. He left Xiangxue Sun Hei after the season ended in May.

== International career ==
Serrano was called up by manager Paulo Autuori for his debut match with the Peru national team on 23 February 2003. His debut match was a friendly against Haiti and finished in a 5–1 win for his side, with Serrano scoring the winning goal in the 19th minute.

== Honours ==
Deportivo UPAO

- Copa Perú: 1999

Alianza Lima

- Torneo Descentralizado: 2003
