= Pedro Serrano (police officer) =

Pedro Serrano is a New York Police Department officer who testified against the department in Floyd v. City of New York, a lawsuit brought by the Center for Constitutional Rights over the department's stop-and-frisk policies. He also made recordings of his superiors which suggested that the NYPD required arrest quotas from patrolmen which were used as evidence in the trial.
