= Rohan Polanco =

Dominican Republic boxer (born 1998)

Personal information
- Full name: Rohan Polanco Emiliano
- Nationality: Dominican
- Born: 15 October 1998 (age 27) Santo Domingo, Dominican Republic
- Height: 5 ft 10 in (178 cm)
- Weight: Welterweight

Boxing career
- Stance: Orthodox

Boxing record
- Total fights: 18
- Wins: 18
- Win by KO: 10
Medal record
Representing Dominican Republic
Pan American Games
Silver medal – second place	2019 Lima	Welterweight

Rohan Polanco Emiliano (Note: In this Spanish name, the first or paternal surname is Polanco and the second or maternal family name is Emiliano.) (born 15 October 1998) is a Dominican professional boxer. As an amateur, he competed in the men's welterweight event at the 2020 Summer Olympics.

== Professional career ==
On December 9, 2023, in Pembroke Pines, FL, Polanco stopped Keith Hunt in the sixth round.

On September 27, 2024, in New York, NY, Polanco stopped Marcelino Nicolas Lopez in the sixth round.

Polanco was scheduled to face Fabián Maidana in a welterweight bout in Las Vegas on May 4, 2025. Polanco won the fight by unanimous decision.

== Professional boxing record ==
18 fights	18 wins	0 losses
By knockout	10	0
By decision	8	0

No.	Result	Record	Opponent	Type	Round, time	Date	Location	Notes
18	Win	18–0	Alex Martin	UD	10	30 May 2026	Palacio de Recreacion, Mayagüez, Puerto Rico	
17	Win	17–0	Quinton Randall	UD	10	26 Jul 2025	The Theater at Madison Square Garden, New York City, New York, U.S.	
16	Win	16–0	Fabián Maidana	UD	10	4 May 2025	T-Mobile Arena, Paradise, Nevada, U.S.	Won vacant WBO Inter-Continental welterweight title
15	Win	15–0	Jean Carlos Torres	KO	2 (10), 1:48	14 Feb 2025	The Theater at Madison Square Garden, New York City, New York, U.S.	
14	Win	14–0	Marcelino Nicolas Lopez	TKO	6 (10), 2:08	27 Sep 2024	The Theater at Madison Square Garden, New York City, New York, U.S.	
13	Win	13–0	Luis Hernández Ramos	TKO	2 (8), 2:28	29 Jun 2024	James L. Knight Center, Miami Beach, Florida, U.S.	
12	Win	12–0	Tarik Zaina	UD	8	2 Mar 2024	Turning Stone Resort Casino, Verona, New York, U.S.	
11	Win	11–0	Keith Hunter	TKO	6 (8), 2:56	9 Dec 2023	Charles F. Dodge City Arena, Pembroke Pines, Florida, U.S.	
10	Win	10–0	Cesar Francis	TKO	5 (8), 1:05	28 Jul 2023	Palms Casino Resort, Paradise, Nevada, U.S.	
9	Win	9–0	Ricardo Quiroz	UD	6	1 Apr 2023	Hard Rock Hotel & Casino, Tulsa, Oklahoma, U.S.	
8	Win	8–0	Dedrick Bell	KO	2 (8), 2:13	6 Aug 2022	Dickies Arena, Fort Worth, Texas, U.S.	
7	Win	7–0	Ronan Nahuel Sánchez	TKO	8 (8), 1:38	28 May 2022	Zaal Stadspark, Turnhout, Belgium	
6	Win	6–0	Jonathan José Eniz	UD	8	20 Nov 2021	Moseley's on the Charles, Dedham, Massachusetts, U.S.	
5	Win	5–0	Gabriel Fernando Puñalef Calfin	TKO	3 (8), 1:23	6 Nov 2021	Exposition Building, Portland, Maine, U.S.	
4	Win	4–0	Arblin Kaba	TKO	3 (8), 2:05	29 May 2021	Hotel Agua Azul, Mao, Dominican Republic	
3	Win	3–0	Ricardo Díaz Núñez	TKO	1 (6), 1:45	6 Feb 2021	Big Punch Arena, Tijuana, Mexico	
2	Win	2–0	Leonardo Espinal	UD	6	17 Dec 2020	Hotel Catalonia Malecón Center, Santo Domingo, Dominican Republic	
1	Win	1–0	Jesús López Pérez	UD	6	19 Jul 2020	Cancha Beisball IMDET, Tijuana, Mexico	
