= Rosana Serrano =

Cuban rower

Personal information
- Born: July 17, 1998 (age 27)

Sport
- Country: Cuba
Medal record
Pan American Games
Bronze medal – third place	2019 Lima	Lightweight double sculls

Rosana Serrano (born 17 July 1998) is a Cuban rower.

Serrano competed at the 2019 Pan American Games where she won a bronze medal in the Lightweight double sculls event alongside Milena Venega.
