= Brazil at the 2019 Pan American Games =

- IOC code: BRA
- NOC: Brazilian Olympic Committee

in Lima, Peru 26 July–11 August 2019
- Competitors: 485 in 37 sports
- Flag bearers (opening): Martine Grael and Kahena Kunze
- Flag bearer (closing): Rafaela Silva
- Medals Ranked 2nd: Gold 54 Silver 45 Bronze 70 Total 169

Pan American Games appearances (overview)
- 1951; 1955; 1959; 1963; 1967; 1971; 1975; 1979; 1983; 1987; 1991; 1995; 1999; 2003; 2007; 2011; 2015; 2019; 2023; 2027

Brazil competed in the 2019 Pan American Games in Lima, Peru from July 26 to August 11, 2019.

On July 25, 2019, it was announced that, for the first time in the history of the Pan American Games, a nation would have two flag bearers during the opening ceremony. The indicated were Brazilian 49er FX class sailors Martine Grael and Kahena Kunze.

In 2019, Brazil pulled off its best performance in history, winning 54 gold and 169 overall medals, and finishing second in the standings for the first time since they hosted the competition in 1963.

== Competitors ==
The following is the list of number of competitors (per gender) participating at the games per sport/discipline.

Sport	Men	Women	Total
Archery	4	4	8
Artistic swimming	—N/a	9	9
Athletics	22	23	45
Badminton	4	4	8
Basque pelota	1	0	1
Basketball	4	16	20
Bodybuilding	1	1	2
Bowling	2	2	4
Boxing	5	3	8
Canoeing	9	7	16
Cycling	10	6	16
Diving	4	4	8
Equestrian	12	0	12
Fencing	9	6	15
Golf	2	2	4
Gymnastics	6	14	20
Handball	14	14	28
Judo	7	7	14
Karate	7	8	15
Modern pentathlon	2	3	5
Roller sports	2	1	3
Rowing	15	7	22
Rugby sevens	12	12	24
Sailing	10	7	17
Squash	3	0	3
Shooting	11	10	21
Surfing	4	4	8
Swimming	20	17	37
Table tennis	3	3	6
Taekwondo	4	4	8
Tennis	2	2	4
Triathlon	3	3	6
Volleyball	14	14	28
Water polo	11	11	22
Water skiing	2	2	4
Weightlifting	3	2	5
Wrestling	4	5	9
Total	248	237	485

== Medalists ==
The following competitors from Brazil won medals at the games. In the by discipline sections below, medalists' names are bolded.

Medal	Name	Sport	Event	Date
1st place, gold medalist(s)	Luisa Baptista	Triathlon	Women's	27 July
1st place, gold medalist(s)	Bruna Wurts	Roller sports	Women's free skating	27 July
1st place, gold medalist(s)	Edival Marques	Taekwondo	Men's 68 kg	28 July
1st place, gold medalist(s)	Francisco Barreto; Arthur Nory; Luís Guilherme Porto; Caio Souza; Arthur Zanetti	Gymnastics	Men's artistic team all-around	28 July
1st place, gold medalist(s)	Isaquias Queiroz	Canoeing	Men's C-1 1000 metres	29 July
1st place, gold medalist(s)	Luisa Baptista; Kauê Willy; Vittoria Lopes; Manoel Messias	Triathlon	Mixed relay	29 July
1st place, gold medalist(s)	Milena Titoneli	Taekwondo	Women's 67 kg	29 July
1st place, gold medalist(s)	Caio Souza	Gymnastics	Men's artistic individual all-around	29 July
1st place, gold medalist(s)	Francisco Barreto	Gymnastics	Men's pommel horse	30 July
1st place, gold medalist(s)	Fernando Reis	Weightlifting	Men's +109 kg	30 July
1st place, gold medalist(s)	Brazil women's national handball team	Handball	Women's tournament	30 July
1st place, gold medalist(s)	Francisco Barreto	Gymnastics	Men's horizontal bar	31 July
1st place, gold medalist(s)	Lena Guimarães	Surfing	Women's SUP race	2 August
1st place, gold medalist(s)	Ygor Coelho	Badminton	Men's singles	2 August
1st place, gold medalist(s)	Beatriz Ferreira	Boxing	Women's Lightweight	2 August
1st place, gold medalist(s)	Ana Marcela Cunha	Swimming	Women's marathon 10 kilometres	4 August
1st place, gold medalist(s)	Ana Sátila	Canoeing	Women's slalom C-1	4 August
1st place, gold medalist(s)	Pedro Gonçalves	Canoeing	Men's slalom K-1	4 August
1st place, gold medalist(s)	Chloé Calmon	Surfing	Women's Longboard	4 August
1st place, gold medalist(s)	Pedro Gonçalves	Canoeing	Men's extreme slalom K-1	4 August
1st place, gold medalist(s)	Ana Sátila	Canoeing	Women's extreme slalom K-1	4 August
1st place, gold medalist(s)	João Menezes	Tennis	Men's singles	4 August
1st place, gold medalist(s)	Vitoria Guerra; Deborah Medrado; Nicole Pircio; Camila Rossi; Beatriz da Silva	Gymnastics	Women's rhythmic group 3 hoops + 2 clubs	5 August
1st place, gold medalist(s)	Hugo Calderano; Gustavo Tsuboi	Table tennis	Men's doubles	6 August
1st place, gold medalist(s)	João Gomes Júnior	Swimming	Men's 100 metre breaststroke	6 August
1st place, gold medalist(s)	Leonardo de Deus	Swimming	Men's 200 metre butterfly	6 August
1st place, gold medalist(s)	Breno Correia; Marcelo Chierighini; Bruno Fratus; Pedro Spajari	Swimming	Men's 4 × 100 metre freestyle relay	6 August
1st place, gold medalist(s)	Rodrigo Lambre; Eduardo Menezes; Pedro Veniss; Marlon Zanotelli	Equestrian	Team jumping	7 August
1st place, gold medalist(s)	Darlan Romani	Athletics	Men's shot put	7 August
1st place, gold medalist(s)	Hugo Calderano	Table tennis	Men's singles	7 August
1st place, gold medalist(s)	Fernando Scheffer	Swimming	Men's 200 metre freestyle	7 August
1st place, gold medalist(s)	Alison Brendom dos Santos	Athletics	Men's 400 metres hurdles	8 August
1st place, gold medalist(s)	Renan Torres	Judo	Men's 60 kg	8 August
1st place, gold medalist(s)	Larissa Pimenta	Judo	Women's 52 kg	8 August
1st place, gold medalist(s)	Marcelo Chierighini	Swimming	Men's 100 metre freestyle	8 August
1st place, gold medalist(s)	Guilherme Guido; João Gomes Júnior; Giovanna Diamante; Larissa Oliveira	Swimming	Mixed 4 × 100 metre medley relay	8 August
1st place, gold medalist(s)	Patrícia Freitas	Sailing	Women's RS:X	9 August
1st place, gold medalist(s)	Marlon Zanotelli	Equestrian	Individual jumping	9 August
1st place, gold medalist(s)	Marco Grael; Gabriel Borges	Sailing	49er	9 August
1st place, gold medalist(s)	Ederson Pereira	Athletics	Men's 10,000 metres	9 August
1st place, gold medalist(s)	Andressa Fidelis; Vitória Cristina Rosa; Lorraine Martins; Rosângela Santos	Athletics	Women's 4 × 100 metres relay	9 August
1st place, gold medalist(s)	Rodrigo Nascimento; Jorge Henrique Vides; Derick Souza; Paulo André Camilo	Athletics	Men's 4 × 100 metres relay	9 August
1st place, gold medalist(s)	Etiene Medeiros	Swimming	Women's 50 metre freestyle	9 August
1st place, gold medalist(s)	Bruno Fratus	Swimming	Men's 50 metre freestyle	9 August
1st place, gold medalist(s)	Luiz Altamir Melo; Fernando Scheffer; João de Lucca; Breno Correia	Swimming	Men's 4 × 200 metre freestyle relay	9 August
1st place, gold medalist(s)	Martine Grael; Kahena Kunze	Sailing	49erFX	10 August
1st place, gold medalist(s)	Bruno Lobo	Sailing	Kites	10 August
1st place, gold medalist(s)	Matheus Dellagnelo	Sailing	Sunfish	10 August
1st place, gold medalist(s)	Altobeli da Silva	Athletics	Men's 3000 metres steeplechase	10 August
1st place, gold medalist(s)	Valéria Kumizaki	Karate	Women's 55 kg	10 August
1st place, gold medalist(s)	Eduardo Yudy	Judo	Men's 81 kg	10 August
1st place, gold medalist(s)	Guilherme Costa	Swimming	Men's 1500 metre freestyle	10 August
1st place, gold medalist(s)	Brazil women's national basketball team	Basketball	Women's tournament	10 August
1st place, gold medalist(s)	Mayra Aguiar	Judo	Women's 78 kg	11 August
2nd place, silver medalist(s)	Vittoria Lopes	Triathlon	Women's	27 July
2nd place, silver medalist(s)	Manoel Messias	Triathlon	Men's	27 July
2nd place, silver medalist(s)	Talisca Reis	Taekwondo	Women's 49 kg	27 July
2nd place, silver medalist(s)	Henrique Avancini	Cycling	Men's cross-country	28 July
2nd place, silver medalist(s)	Ícaro Miguel Soares	Taekwondo	Men's −80 kg	29 July
2nd place, silver medalist(s)	Arthur Nory	Gymnastics	Men's artistic individual all-around	29 July
2nd place, silver medalist(s)	Arthur Zanetti	Gymnastics	Men's rings	30 July
2nd place, silver medalist(s)	Marcelo Suartz	Bowling	Men's singles	30 July
2nd place, silver medalist(s)	Caio Souza	Gymnastics	Men's horizontal bars	31 July
2nd place, silver medalist(s)	Arthur Nory	Gymnastics	Men's horizontal bar	31 July
2nd place, silver medalist(s)	Keno Machado	Boxing	Men's 81 kg	1 August
2nd place, silver medalist(s)	Jucielen Romeu	Boxing	Women's 57 kg	1 August
2nd place, silver medalist(s)	Vinnicius Martins	Surfing	Men's SUP race	2 August
2nd place, silver medalist(s)	Hebert Conceição	Boxing	Men's Middleweight	2 August
2nd place, silver medalist(s)	Caio Bonfim	Athletics	Men's 20 kilometres walk	4 August
2nd place, silver medalist(s)	Ruy Fonseca; Rafael Losano; Carlos Parro; Marcelo Tosi	Equestrian	Team eventing	4 August
2nd place, silver medalist(s)	Bárbara Domingos	Gymnastics	Women's rhythmic individual ribbon	5 August
2nd place, silver medalist(s)	Bruna Takahashi; Gustavo Tsuboi	Table tennis	Mixed doubles	5 August
2nd place, silver medalist(s)	Altobeli da Silva	Athletics	Men's 5000 metres	6 August
2nd place, silver medalist(s)	Fernanda Martins	Athletics	Women's discus throw	6 August
2nd place, silver medalist(s)	Fernando Scheffer	Swimming	Men's 400 metre freestyle	6 August
2nd place, silver medalist(s)	Etiene Medeiros; Larissa Oliveira; Manuella Lyrio; Daynara de Paula	Swimming	Women's 4 × 100 metre freestyle relay	6 August
2nd place, silver medalist(s)	Magno Nazaret	Cycling	Men's road time trial	7 August
2nd place, silver medalist(s)	Paulo André Camilo	Athletics	Men's 100 metres	7 August
2nd place, silver medalist(s)	Breno Correia	Swimming	Men's 200 metre freestyle	7 August
2nd place, silver medalist(s)	Breno Correia; Marcelo Chierighini; Larissa Oliveira; Etiene Medeiros	Swimming	Mixed 4 × 100 metre freestyle relay	7 August
2nd place, silver medalist(s)	Guilherme Guido	Swimming	Men's 100 metre backstroke	8 August
2nd place, silver medalist(s)	Miguel Valente	Swimming	Men's 800 metre freestyle	8 August
2nd place, silver medalist(s)	Pau Vela; Xavier Vela	Rowing	Men's coxless pair	9 August
2nd place, silver medalist(s)	Bruno Fontes	Sailing	Laser	9 August
2nd place, silver medalist(s)	Paola Reis	Cycling	Women's BMX racing	9 August
2nd place, silver medalist(s)	Anderson Ezequiel	Cycling	Men's BMX racing	9 August
2nd place, silver medalist(s)	Vitória Cristina Rosa	Athletics	Women's 200 metres	9 August
2nd place, silver medalist(s)	Guilherme Toldo; Heitor Shimbo; Henrique Marques	Fencing	Men's team foil	9 August
2nd place, silver medalist(s)	Aline Silva	Wrestling	Women's Freestyle 76 kg	9 August
2nd place, silver medalist(s)	Daniel Cargnin	Judo	Men's 66 kg	9 August
2nd place, silver medalist(s)	Leonardo Coelho Santos	Swimming	Men's 400 metre individual medley	9 August
2nd place, silver medalist(s)	Cláudio Biekarck; Isabel Ficker; Gunnar Ficker	Sailing	Lightning	10 August
2nd place, silver medalist(s)	Augusto Dutra	Athletics	Men's pole vault	10 August
2nd place, silver medalist(s)	Bruna Takahashi; Caroline Kumahara; Jessica Yamada	Table tennis	Women's team	10 August
2nd place, silver medalist(s)	Caio Pumputis	Swimming	Men's 200 metre individual medley	10 August
2nd place, silver medalist(s)	Guilherme Guido; João Gomes Júnior; Vinícius Lanza; Marcelo Chierighini	Swimming	Men's 4 × 100 metre medley relay	10 August
2nd place, silver medalist(s)	Hernani Veríssimo	Karate	Men's 75 kg	11 August
2nd place, silver medalist(s)	Douglas Brose	Karate	Men's 60 kg	11 August
2nd place, silver medalist(s)	Marcus Vinicius D'Almeida	Archery	Men's individual recurve	11 August
3rd place, bronze medalist(s)	Gustavo Casado	Roller sports	Men's free skating	27 July
3rd place, bronze medalist(s)	Paulo Ricardo Melo	Taekwondo	Men's 58 kg	27 July
3rd place, bronze medalist(s)	Jade Barbosa; Thais Fidelis; Lorrane Oliveira; Carolyne Pedro; Flávia Saraiva	Gymnastics	Women's artistic team all-around	27 July
3rd place, bronze medalist(s)	Jaqueline Mourão	Cycling	Women's cross-country	28 July
3rd place, bronze medalist(s)	Júlio Antônio Almeida	Shooting	Men's 10 metre air pistol	28 July
3rd place, bronze medalist(s)	Vagner Souta	Canoeing	Men's K-1 1000 metres	29 July
3rd place, bronze medalist(s)	Ana Paula Vergutz	Canoeing	Women's K-1 500 metres	29 July
3rd place, bronze medalist(s)	Flávia Saraiva	Gymnastics	Women's artistic individual all-around	29 July
3rd place, bronze medalist(s)	João Paulo dos Santos; João Victor Oliva; Leandro Aparecido; Pedro de Almeida	Equestrian	Team dressage	29 July
3rd place, bronze medalist(s)	Maicon Andrade	Taekwondo	Men's +80 kg	29 July
3rd place, bronze medalist(s)	Isabela Abreu; Priscila Oliveira	Modern pentathlon	Women's relay	29 July
3rd place, bronze medalist(s)	Raiany Fidelis Pereira	Taekwondo	Women's +67 kg	29 July
3rd place, bronze medalist(s)	Mariana Nep Osmak	Water skiing	Women's wakeboard	29 July
3rd place, bronze medalist(s)	Carolina Horta; Ângela Lavalle	Beach volleyball	Women's tournament	30 July
3rd place, bronze medalist(s)	Abner Teixeira	Boxing	Men's 91 kg	30 July
3rd place, bronze medalist(s)	Roberto Schmits	Shooting	Men's trap	30 July
3rd place, bronze medalist(s)	Flávia Figueiredo	Boxing	Women's 75 kg	30 July
3rd place, bronze medalist(s)	Flávia Saraiva	Gymnastics	Women's floor	31 July
3rd place, bronze medalist(s)	Fabiana Silva; Tamires dos Santos	Badminton	Women's doubles	1 August
3rd place, bronze medalist(s)	Fabrício Farias; Francielton Farias	Badminton	Men's doubles	1 August
3rd place, bronze medalist(s)	Jaqueline Lima; Sâmia Lima	Badminton	Women's doubles	1 August
3rd place, bronze medalist(s)	Jaqueline Lima; Fabrício Farias	Badminton	Mixed doubles	1 August
3rd place, bronze medalist(s)	Isaac Souza; Kawan Pereira	Diving	Men's synchronized 10 metre platform	2 August
3rd place, bronze medalist(s)	Natália Gaudio	Gymnastics	Women's rhythmic individual all-around	3 August
3rd place, bronze medalist(s)	Vitoria Guerra; Deborah Medrado; Nicole Pircio; Camila Rossi; Beatriz da Silva	Gymnastics	Women's rhythmic group all-around	3 August
3rd place, bronze medalist(s)	Carolina Meligeni Alves; Luisa Stefani	Tennis	Women's doubles	3 August
3rd place, bronze medalist(s)	Nicole Pacelli	Surfing	Women's SUP surf	4 August
3rd place, bronze medalist(s)	Érica de Sena	Athletics	Women's 20 kilometres walk	4 August
3rd place, bronze medalist(s)	Viviane Jungblut	Swimming	Women's marathon 10 kilometres	4 August
3rd place, bronze medalist(s)	Victor Colonese	Swimming	Men's marathon 10 kilometres	4 August
3rd place, bronze medalist(s)	Felipe Borges	Canoeing	Men's slalom C-1	4 August
3rd place, bronze medalist(s)	Carlos Parro	Equestrian	Individual eventing	4 August
3rd place, bronze medalist(s)	Vitoria Guerra; Deborah Medrado; Nicole Pircio; Camila Rossi; Beatriz da Silva	Gymnastics	Women's rhythmic group 5 balls	4 August
3rd place, bronze medalist(s)	Brazil men's national volleyball team	Volleyball	Men's tournament	4 August
3rd place, bronze medalist(s)	Beatriz Bulcão	Fencing	Women's foil	5 August
3rd place, bronze medalist(s)	Bruna Takahashi; Jessica Yamada	Table tennis	Women's doubles	5 August
3rd place, bronze medalist(s)	Brazil men's national handball team	Handball	Men's tournament	5 August
3rd place, bronze medalist(s)	Luiz Altamir Melo	Swimming	Men's 400 metre freestyle	6 August
3rd place, bronze medalist(s)	Bruna Takahashi	Table tennis	Women's singles	7 August
3rd place, bronze medalist(s)	Nathalie Moellhausen	Fencing	Women's épée	7 August
3rd place, bronze medalist(s)	Vitória Cristina Rosa	Athletics	Women's 100 metres	7 August
3rd place, bronze medalist(s)	Larissa Oliveira	Swimming	Women's 200 metre freestyle	7 August
3rd place, bronze medalist(s)	Vinicius Lanza	Swimming	Men's 100 metre butterfly	7 August
3rd place, bronze medalist(s)	Leonardo de Deus	Swimming	Men's 200 metre backstroke	7 August
3rd place, bronze medalist(s)	Uncas Batista; Lucas Verthein	Rowing	Men's double sculls	8 August
3rd place, bronze medalist(s)	Willian Giaretton; Fábio Moreira; Alef Fontoura; Gabriel Campos	Rowing	Men's coxless four	8 August
3rd place, bronze medalist(s)	Giullia Penalber	Wrestling	Women's Freestyle 57 kg	8 August
3rd place, bronze medalist(s)	Larissa Oliveira	Swimming	Women's 100 metre freestyle	8 August
3rd place, bronze medalist(s)	Etiene Medeiros	Swimming	Women's 100 metre backstroke	8 August
3rd place, bronze medalist(s)	Viviane Jungblut	Swimming	Women's 800 metre freestyle	8 August
3rd place, bronze medalist(s)	Filipe Otheguy	Basque pelota	Men's singles hand fronton	9 August
3rd place, bronze medalist(s)	Samuel Albrecht; Gabriela Nicolino	Sailing	Nacra 17	9 August
3rd place, bronze medalist(s)	Laís Nunes	Wrestling	Women's Freestyle 62 kg	9 August
3rd place, bronze medalist(s)	Izabel Cristine Cardoso; Carolaini Pereira; Sabrina Pereira	Karate	Women's team kata	9 August
3rd place, bronze medalist(s)	Guilherme Silva; Lucas Santos; Victor Mota	Karate	Men's team kata	9 August
3rd place, bronze medalist(s)	Jeferson Santos Júnior	Judo	Men's 73 kg	8 August
3rd place, bronze medalist(s)	Brandonn Almeida	Swimming	Men's 400 metre individual medley	9 August
3rd place, bronze medalist(s)	Aline Rodrigues; Larissa Oliveira; Manuella Lyrio; Gabrielle Roncatto	Swimming	Women's 4 × 200 metre freestyle relay	9 August
3rd place, bronze medalist(s)	Brazil women's national water polo team	Water polo	Women's tournament	10 August
3rd place, bronze medalist(s)	Eduardo Rodrigues	Athletics	Men's 110 metres hurdles	10 August
3rd place, bronze medalist(s)	Rafael Martins; Juliana Duque	Sailing	Snipe	10 August
3rd place, bronze medalist(s)	Hugo Calderano; Eric Jouti; Gustavo Tsuboi	Table tennis	Men's team	10 August
3rd place, bronze medalist(s)	Jéssica de Paula	Karate	Women's 50 kg	10 August
3rd place, bronze medalist(s)	Alexia Castilhos	Judo	Women's 63 kg	10 August
3rd place, bronze medalist(s)	Brazil men's national water polo team	Water polo	Men's tournament	10 August
3rd place, bronze medalist(s)	Leonardo Coelho Santos	Swimming	Men's 200 metre individual medley	10 August
3rd place, bronze medalist(s)	Etiene Medeiros; Jhennifer Conceição; Giovanna Diamante; Larissa Oliveira	Swimming	Women's 4 × 100 metre medley relay	10 August
3rd place, bronze medalist(s)	Beatriz Souza	Judo	Women's +78 kg	11 August
3rd place, bronze medalist(s)	David Moura	Judo	Men's +100 kg	11 August
3rd place, bronze medalist(s)	Vinicius Figueira	Karate	Men's 67 kg	11 August

**Medals by sport**
**Sport**	1st place, gold medalist(s)	2nd place, silver medalist(s)	3rd place, bronze medalist(s)	Total
Swimming	11	9	13	33
Athletics	6	6	3	15
Gymnastics	5	5	6	16
Sailing	5	2	2	9
Judo	4	1	4	9
Canoeing	5	0	3	8
Taekwondo	2	2	3	7
Table tennis	2	2	3	7
Triathlon	2	2	0	4
Equestrian	2	1	2	5
Surfing	2	1	1	4
Boxing	1	3	2	6
Karate	1	2	4	7
Badminton	1	0	4	5
Roller sports	1	0	1	2
Tennis	1	0	1	2
Handball	1	0	1	2
Weightlifting	1	0	0	1
Basketball	1	0	0	1
Cycling	0	4	1	5
Rowing	0	1	2	3
Fencing	0	1	2	3
Wrestling	0	1	2	3
Bowling	0	1	0	1
Archery	0	1	0	1
Shooting	0	0	2	2
Water polo	0	0	2	2
Modern pentathlon	0	0	1	1
Water skiing	0	0	1	1
Beach volleyball	0	0	1	1
Diving	0	0	1	1
Volleyball	0	0	1	1
Basque pelota	0	0	1	1
**Total**	**54**	**45**	**70**	169

**Medals by day**
**Day**	1st place, gold medalist(s)	2nd place, silver medalist(s)	3rd place, bronze medalist(s)	**Total**
July 27	2	3	3	8
July 28	2	1	2	5
July 29	4	2	8	14
July 30	3	2	4	9
July 31	1	2	1	4
August 1	0	2	4	6
August 2	3	2	1	6
August 3	0	0	3	3
August 4	7	2	8	17
August 5	1	2	3	6
August 6	4	4	1	9
August 7	4	4	6	14
August 8	5	2	6	13
August 9	9	9	8	26
August 10	8	5	9	22
August 11	1	3	3	7
**Total**	**54**	**45**	**70**	**169**

**Medals by gender**
**Gender**	1st place, gold medalist(s)	2nd place, silver medalist(s)	3rd place, bronze medalist(s)	**Total**
Male	31	31	29	91
Female	19	10	36	65
Mixed	4	4	5	13
**Total**	**54**	**45**	**70**	**169**

== Archery ==
Brazil qualified a full team of eight athletes (four men and four women).

Men

Athlete	Event	Ranking Round		Round of 32	Round of 16	Quarterfinals	Semifinals	Final / BM	Rank
Athlete	Event	Score	Seed	Opposition Score	Opposition Score	Opposition Score	Opposition Score	Opposition Score	Rank
Marcus D'Almeida	Individual recurve	692	2	Lopez Palacios (GUA); W 6–0	Gimpel (CHI); W 7–1	Pérez (CUB); W 6–0	Oliveira (BRA); W 6–2	Duenas (CAN); L 4–6	2nd place, silver medalist(s)
Bernardo Oliveira	Individual recurve	659	11	Castro Rojas (GUA); W 6–0	Alvarado Santin (MEX); W 6–4	Williams (USA); W 6–5	D'Almeida (BRA); L 3–7	Peters (CAN); L 1–7	4
Marcelo Silva	Individual recurve	651	19	Jajarabilla (ARG); L 4–6	did not advance				
Bruno Brassaroto	Individual compound	698	6	—N/a	Bye	Hernandez (ESA); L 143–148	did not advance		
Marcus D'Almeida; Bernardo Oliveira; Marcelo Silva	Team recurve	2002	2	—N/a		Chile; L 4–5	did not advance		

Women

Athlete	Event	Ranking Round		Round of 32	Round of 16	Quarterfinals	Semifinals	Final / BM	Rank
Athlete	Event	Score	Seed	Opposition Score	Opposition Score	Opposition Score	Opposition Score	Opposition Score	Rank
Ane Marcelle dos Santos	Individual recurve	629	12	Yubrin (ARG); W 7–3	Martínez (MEX); L 2–6	did not advance			
Ana Luiza Caetano	Individual recurve	610	18	Fuenmayor (VEN); W 7–1	Kaufhold (USA); L 2–6	did not advance			
Graziela Paulino dos Santos	Individual recurve	608	20	Acosta (COL); L 5–6	did not advance				
Gisele Meleti	Individual compound	673	9	—N/a	Aliaga Hurtado (PER); L 133–141	did not advance			
Ane Marcelle dos Santos; Ana Luisa Caetano; Graziela Paulino dos Santos	Team recurve	1847	5	—N/a		Canada; W 6–0	Mexico; L 0–6	Colombia; L 1–5	4

Mixed

Athlete	Event	Ranking round		Round of 16	Quarterfinal	Semifinal	Final / BM	
Athlete	Event	Score	Rank	Opposition Result	Opposition Result	Opposition Result	Opposition Result	Rank
Marcus Vinicius D'Almeida; Ane Marcelle dos Santos	Team recurve	1321	5	Guillén / Cortez (ESA); L 2–6	Não avançou			
Bruno Brassaroto; Gisele Esposito Meleti	Team compound	1371	6	—N/a	Alba / Becerra (MEX); W 153–151	Carrillo / Zebadúa (GUA); L 150–150	Muñoz / López (COL); L 149–156	4

== Artistic swimming ==
Brazil has qualified a full team of nine athletes.

Athlete	Event	Technical Routine		Free Routine (Final)			
Athlete	Event	Points	Rank	Points	Rank	Total Points	Rank
Luisa Borges; Laura Miccuci	Women's duet	80.4881	4	81.7333	4	162.2214	4
Anna Giulia Veloso; Gabriela Regly Teixeira; Giovana Stephan; Jullia Gomes Soares; Laura Miccuci; Lorena Molinos; Luisa Borges; Maria Bruno; Maria Eduarda Miccuci	Women's team	80.3928	4	80.9000	4	161.2928	4

== Athletics ==
Men
Track & road events

Athlete	Event	Heat		Semifinal		Final	
Athlete	Event	Result	Rank	Result	Rank	Result	Rank
Paulo André de Oliveira	100m	—N/a		10.27	1	10.16	2nd place, silver medalist(s)
Rodrigo do Nascimento	100m	—N/a		10.29	2	10.27	4
Derick Silva	200 m	—N/a		20.76	10	did not advance	
Jorge Vides	200 m	—N/a		20.80	11	did not advance	
Carlos Santos	1500 m	—N/a				3:44.47	6
Altobeli da Silva	5000 m	—N/a				13:54.42	2nd place, silver medalist(s)
Ederson Pereira	5000 m	—N/a				13:58.72	7
Ederson Pereira	10,000m	—N/a				28:27.47	1st place, gold medalist(s)
Altobeli da Silva	3000 m steeplechase	—N/a				8:30.73	1st place, gold medalist(s)
Eduardo de Deus	110 m hurdles	—N/a		13.63	5	13.48	3rd place, bronze medalist(s)
Gabriel Constantino	110 m hurdles	—N/a		13.42	1	did not finish	
Alison dos Santos	400m hurdles	—N/a		49.74	2	48.45	1st place, gold medalist(s)
Wellington da Silva	Marathon	—N/a				2:17:33	11
Caio Bonfim	20 km walk	—N/a				1:21:57	2nd place, silver medalist(s)
Moacir Zimmermann	20 km walk	—N/a				1:33:14	12
Caio Bonfim	50 km walk	—N/a				3:57:54	4
Rodrigo do Nascimento; Jorge Vides; Derick Silva; Paulo André de Oliveira	4 × 100 m relay	—N/a				38.27	1st place, gold medalist(s)

Field events

Athlete	Event	Qualification		Final	
Athlete	Event	Distance	Position	Distance	Position
Fernando Ferreira	High jump	—N/a		2.26	4
Thiago Braz da Silva	Pole vault	—N/a		5.51	4
Augusto Dutra de Oliveira	Pole vault	—N/a		5.71	2nd place, silver medalist(s)
Alexsandro Melo	Long jump	—N/a		7.77	4
Alexsandro Melo	Triple jump	—N/a		16.23	8
Almir dos Santos	Triple jump	—N/a		16.70	4
Darlan Romani	Shot put	—N/a		22.07	1st place, gold medalist(s)
Welington Morais	Shot put	—N/a		19.22	7
Allan Wolski	Hammer throw	—N/a		73.25	6

Combined events – Decathlon

Athlete	Event	100 m	LJ	SP	HJ	400 m	110H	DT	PV	JT	1500 m	Final	Rank
Jefferson Santos	Result	11.25	7.05	14.44	1.97	51.01	15.37	42.95	4.20	51.85	4:58.96	7317	10
Jefferson Santos	Points	806	826	755	776	769	805	725	673	616	566	7317	10

Women
Track & road events

Athlete	Event	Heat		Semifinal		Final	
Athlete	Event	Result	Rank	Result	Rank	Result	Rank
Franciela Krasucki	100 m	—N/a		11.87	15	did not advance	
Vitória Cristina Rosa	100 m	—N/a		11.40	3	11.30	3rd place, bronze medalist(s)
Vitória Cristina Rosa	200 m	—N/a		22.72	1	22.62	2nd place, silver medalist(s)
Lorraine Martins	200 m	—N/a		23.74	11	did not advance	
July Ferreira da Silva	1500 m	—N/a				4:19.25	8
Tatiele de Carvalho	10,000 m	—N/a				33:57.62	9
Tatiane Raquel da Silva	3000 m steeplechase	—N/a				9:56.19	4
Simone Ferraz	3000 m steeplechase	—N/a				10:11.04	8
Érica de Sena	20 km walk	—N/a				1:30:34	3rd place, bronze medalist(s)
Viviane Lyra	50 km walk	—N/a				4:22:46	4
Elianay Pereira	50 km walk	—N/a				4:29:33	5
Valdilene dos Santos Silva	Marathon	—N/a				2:34:20	6
Andreia Aparecida Hessel	Marathon	—N/a				2:35:40	8
Andressa Fidelis; Vitória Cristina Rosa; Lorraine Martins; Rosângela Santos	4 × 100 m relay	—N/a				43.04	1st place, gold medalist(s)

Field events

Athlete	Event	Qualification		Final	
Athlete	Event	Distance	Position	Distance	Position
Valdiléia Martins	High jump	Bye	Bye	1.84	5
Juliana Campos	Pole vault	Bye	Bye	4.10	8
Eliane Martins	Long jump	Bye	Bye	6.19	10
Andressa de Morais	Discus throw	—N/a		65.98	(silver) DSQ
Fernanda Martins	Discus throw	—N/a		62.23	2nd place, silver medalist(s)
Mariana Marcelino	Hammer throw	—N/a		66.15	4
Laila Domingos	Javelin throw	—N/a		59.15	5
Rafaela Gonçalves	Javelin throw	—N/a		50.59	12

Combined events – Heptathlon

Athlete	Event	110H	HJ	SP	200 m	LJ	JT	800 m	Final	Rank
Vanessa Spínola	Result	14.13	1.71	12.19	24.91	5.97	45.00	2:16.67	5868	5
Vanessa Spínola	Points	960	867	674	895	840	763	869	5868	5

== Badminton ==
Brazil qualified a full team of eight athletes (four men and four women).

Men

Athlete	Event	First round	Second round	Third round	Quarterfinals	Semifinals	Final	Rank
Athlete	Event	Opposition Result	Opposition Result	Opposition Result	Opposition Result	Opposition Result	Opposition Result	Rank
Ygor Coelho	Singles	Bye	Canjura (ESA); W 21 – 19, 21 – 11	Martínez (CUB); W 21 – 15, 22 – 20	Lam (USA); W 21 – 16, 21 – 6	Ho-shue (CAN); W 20 – 22, 22 – 20, 21 – 8	Yang (CAN); W 21 – 19, 21 – 10	1st place, gold medalist(s)
Artur Pomoceno	Singles	Bye	Navarro (MEX); L 20 – 22, 11 – 21	did not advance				
Francielton Farias	Singles	Bye	Herrera (CUB); W 21 – 18, 18 – 21, 21 – 14	Ho-Shue (CAN); L 12 – 21, 9 – 21	did not advance			
Fabrício Farias; Francielton Farias	Men's doubles	—N/a		la Torre Regal / Guevara (PER); W 21 – 12, 19 – 21, 21 – 12	Solis / Ramirez (GUA); W 21 – 19, 19 – 21, 21 – 16	Chew / Chew (USA); L 22 – 20, 13 – 21, 17 – 21	Did not advance	3rd place, bronze medalist(s)

Women

Athlete	Event	First round	Second round	Third round	Quarterfinals	Semifinals	Final	Rank
Athlete	Event	Opposition Result	Opposition Result	Opposition Result	Opposition Result	Opposition Result	Opposition Result	Rank
Fabiana Silva	Singles	Bye	Solis (MEX); W 21 – 11, 21 – 16	Castillo (PER); W 21 – 18, 21 – 8	Sotomayor (GUA); L 21 – 13, 19 – 21, 13 – 21	did not advance		
Jaqueline Lopes Lima	Singles	Bye	Ortíz (CUB); W 21 – 12, 21 – 12	Gaitán (MEX); L 20 – 22, 19 – 21	did not advance			
Sâmia Lima	Singles	Bye	Honderich (CAN); L 14 – 21, 11 – 21	did not advance				
Fabiana Silva; Tamires dos Santos	Women's doubles	—N/a		Corleto / Sotomayor (GUA); W 14 – 21, 22 – 20, 21 – 16	Montre / Naranjo (CHI); W 21 – 7, 21, – 13	Honderich / Tsai (CAN); L 5 – 21, 8, – 21	Did not advance	3rd place, bronze medalist(s)
Jaqueline Lopes Lima; Sâmia Lima	Women's doubles	—N/a		Jimenez / Polanco (DOM); W 21 – 13, 21 – 23, 21 – 18	Macias / Nishimura (PER); W 15 – 21, 21 – 15, 24 – 22	Chen / Hsu (USA); W 21 – 17, 12 – 21, 18 – 21	Did not advance	3rd place, bronze medalist(s)

Mixed

Athlete	Event	First round	Second round	Quarterfinals	Semifinals	Final	Rank
Athlete	Event	Opposition Result	Opposition Result	Opposition Result	Opposition Result	Opposition Result	Rank
Artur Pomoceno; Fabiana Silva	Mixed doubles	Ricketts / Richardson (JAM); W 21 – 9, 21 – 17	Yakura / Tsai (CAN); L 11 – 21, 10 – 21	did not advance			
Fabrício Farias; Jaqueline Lopes Lima	Mixed doubles	Bye	Martínez / Ortíz (CUB); W 21 – 17, 21 – 17	Javier / Jimenez (DOM); W 21 – 8, 21 – 19	Yu / Wu (CAN); L 22 – 20, 17 – 21, 13 – 21	Did not advance	3rd place, bronze medalist(s)

== Basketball ==
=== 5x5 ===
Summary

Team	Event	Preliminary round				Semifinal	Final / BM / Pl.	
Team	Event	Opposition Result	Opposition Result	Opposition Result	Rank	Opposition Result	Opposition Result	Rank
Brazil women	Women's tournament	Canada; W 79–71	Puerto Rico; W 64–58	Paraguay; W 81–37	1 Q	Colombia; W 62–48	United States; W 79–73	1st place, gold medalist(s)

==== Women's tournament ====
Preliminary round

Team	Pld	W	L	PF	PA	PD	Pts	Qualification
Brazil	3	3	0	224	166	+58	6	Qualified for the Semifinals
Puerto Rico	3	2	1	221	200	+21	5	Qualified for the Semifinals
Canada	3	1	2	224	215	+9	4	
Paraguay	3	0	3	174	262	−88	3	

6 August 2019
13:30

Report

Canada	71–79	Brazil
Scoring by quarter: 21–24, 19–16, 12–19, 19–20
Pts: Pellington 21; Rebs: Hamblin 10; Asts: Pellington, Scott 3		Pts: Dos Santos 15; Rebs: Dos Santos 11; Asts: three players 3

Coliseo Eduardo Dibos, Lima
Referees: Steven Anderson (USA)

7 August 2019
21:00

Report

Brazil	64–58	Puerto Rico
Scoring by quarter: 13–14, 19–17, 19–9, 13–18
Pts: Dos Santos, De Souza 12; Rebs: Dos Santos 4 Asts: Costa 5		Pts: O'Neill 23; Rebs: Pagan 7 Asts: Meléndez, Gwathmey 2

Coliseo Eduardo Dibos, Lima
Referees: Leandro Lezcano (ARG)

8 August 2019
18:00

Report

Paraguay	37–81	Brazil
Scoring by quarter: 10–21, 12–14, 5–21, 10–25
Pts: Ferrari 10; Rebs: Ferrari 7 Asts: Insfrán, Caraves 2		Pts: Soares 15; Rebs: Teixeira 8 Asts: Paixão 4

Coliseo Eduardo Dibos, Lima
Referees: Andrés Bartel (URU)

Semifinal

9 August 2019
18:00

Report

Brazil	62–48	Colombia
Scoring by quarter: 13–17, 16–4, 20–14, 13–13
Pts: Dos Santos 18; Rebs: Dos Santos 13; Asts: De Souza 4		Pts: Muñoz 9 Rebs: Mosquera 7 Asts: Arias 2

Coliseo Eduardo Dibos, Lima
Referees: Luis Vázquez (PUR)

Gold medal game

10 August 2019
21:00

Report

Brazil	79–73	United States
Scoring by quarter: 20–22, 19–16, 16–15, 24–20
Pts: Paixão 24; Rebs: Paixão 7 Asts: Paixão 3		Pts: Carter, Mompremier 16; Rebs: Mompremier 12; Asts: Harris 5

Coliseo Eduardo Dibos, Lima
Referees: Leandro Lezcano (ARG)

=== 3x3 ===
Summary

Team	Event	Preliminary round						Semifinal	Final / BM / Pl.	
Team	Event	Opposition Result	Opposition Result	Opposition Result	Opposition Result	Opposition Result	Rank	Opposition Result	Opposition Result	Rank
Brazil men	Men's tournament	Dominican Republic; W 22–13	United States; W 20–19	Venezuela; L 20–22	Puerto Rico; L 18–21	Argentina; W 18–13	3 Q	United States; L 12–21	Dominican Republic; L 17–19	4
Brazil women	Women's tournament	Dominican Republic; L 14–16	Venezuela; W 22–20	United States; L 7–21	Argentina; L 13–16	Uruguay; W 20–16	4 Q	United States; L 5–21	Dominican Republic; L 15–20	4

==== Men's tournament ====
Preliminary round

Pos	Team	Pld	W	L	PF	PA	PD	Qualification
1	Puerto Rico	5	5	0	104	70	+34	Semifinals
2	Brazil	5	3	2	101	91	+10	Semifinals
3	United States	5	2	3	99	89	+10	Semifinals
4	Dominican Republic	5	2	3	81	98	−17	Semifinals
5	Venezuela	5	2	3	85	104	−19	Fifth place match
6	Argentina	5	1	4	86	104	−18	Fifth place match

Source: Report
Rules for classification: 1) Wins; 2) Head-to-head record; 3) Points scored.

27 July 2019
16:30

Report

Brazil	22–13	Dominican Republic
Pts: Weihermann 11		Pts: Beato 10

Coliseo Eduardo Dibos
Referees: Sonia Maldonado (PUR) / Glenn Tuitt (USA)

27 July 2019
20:00

Report

Brazil	20–19	United States
Pts: De Mello 9		Pts: Jones 7

Coliseo Eduardo Dibos
Referees: Sonia Maldonado (PUR) / Gonzalo Paz (URU)

28 July 2019
14:30

Report

Brazil	20–22	Venezuela
Pts: Froehlich 10		Pts: Carrera 14

Coliseo Eduardo Dibos
Referees: Ángel Martínez (PUR) / Glenn Tuitt (USA)

28 July 2019
18:30

Report

Brazil	18–21	Puerto Rico
Pts: De Camargo 6		Pts: Matías 13

Coliseo Eduardo Dibos
Referees: Kayla Herdman (CAN) / Glenn Tuitt (USA)

28 July 2019
21:00

Report

Argentina	16–21	Brazil
Pts: Ruesga 7		Pts: Weihermann 9

Coliseo Eduardo Dibos
Referees: Kayla Herdman (CAN) / Gonzalo Paz (URU)

Semifinal

29 July 2019
10:30

Report

Brazil	12–21	United States
Pts: Froehlich 6		Pts: Octeus 8

Coliseo Eduardo Dibos
Referees: Ángel Martínez (PUR) / Gonzalo Paz (URU)

Bronze medal game

29 July 2019
12:30

Report

Dominican Republic	19–17	Brazil
Pts: Piantini, Núñez 7		Pts: Froehlich 8

Coliseo Eduardo Dibos
Referees: Ángel Martínez (PUR) / Glenn Tuitt (USA)

==== Women's tournament ====
Preliminary round

Pos	Team	Pld	W	L	PF	PA	PD	Qualification
1	United States	5	5	0	102	48	+54	Semifinals
2	Argentina	5	4	1	76	68	+8	Semifinals
3	Dominican Republic	5	3	2	68	73	−5	Semifinals
4	Brazil	5	2	3	76	89	−13	Semifinals
5	Venezuela	5	1	4	72	80	−8	Fifth place match
6	Uruguay	5	0	5	55	91	−36	Fifth place match

Source: Lima 2019
Rules for classification: 1) Wins; 2) Head-to-head record; 3) Points scored.

27 July 2019
14:30

Report

Brazil	14–16	Dominican Republic
Pts: Mariano, Mineiro 5		Pts: Hernández 9

Coliseo Eduardo Dibos
Referees: Sonia Maldonado / Ángel Martínez (PUR)

27 July 2019
18:30

Report

Brazil	22–20	Venezuela
Pts: Mariano 8		Pts: Wallen 10

Coliseo Eduardo Dibos
Referees: Ángel Martínez (PUR) / Glenn Tuitt (USA)

27 July 2019
21:00

Report

United States	21–7	Brazil
Pts: Hebard 10		Pts: Mineiro 3

Coliseo Eduardo Dibos
Referees: Ángel Martínez (PUR) / Gonzalo Paz (URU)

28 July 2019
16:30

Report

Brazil	13–16	Argentina
Pts: Silva, Mineiro 4		Pts: 4 players 4

Coliseo Eduardo Dibos
Referees: Kayla Herdman (CAN) / Ángel Martínez (PUR)

28 July 2019
20:00

Report

Uruguay	16–20	Brazil
Pts: Gayoso 10		Pts: Silva 7

Coliseo Eduardo Dibos
Referees: Sonia Maldonado (PUR) / Ángel Martínez (PUR)

Semifinal

29 July 2019
9:00

Report

United States	21–5	Brazil
Pts: Ionescu 9		Pts: Mariano 2

Coliseo Eduardo Dibos
Referees: Kayla Herdman (CAN) / Sonia Maldonado (CAN)

Bronze medal game

29 July 2019
12:00

Report

Brazil	15–20	Dominican Republic
Pts: three players 4		Pts: Reynoso 8

Coliseo Eduardo Dibos
Referees: Kayla Herdman (CAN) / Sonia Maldonado (PUR)

== Basque pelota ==
Brazil qualified one athlete to the basque pelota competition.

Men

Athlete	Event	Preliminary round					Semifinal	Final / BM	Rank
Athlete	Event	Match 1	Match 2	Match 3	Match 4	Rank	Semifinal	Final / BM	Rank
Athlete	Event	Opposition Score	Opposition Score	Opposition Score	Opposition Score	Rank	Opposition Score	Opposition Score	Rank
Filipe Otheguy	Mano singles 36m fronton	Álvarez (MEX); L 0–2	Airala (URU); W 2–1	—N/a		2 Q	Leiva (CUB); L 0–2	Bazo (BOL); W 2–0	3rd place, bronze medalist(s)

== Bodybuilding ==
Brazil qualified a full team of two bodybuilders (one male and one female).

Athlete	Event	Prejudging		Final	
Athlete	Event	Points	Rank	Points	Rank
Juscelino Nascimento	Men's classic bodybuilding	—N/a		Did not advance	
Carla Ghislen	Women's bikini fitness	—N/a		Did not advance	

- No results were provided for the prejudging round, with only the top six advancing.

== Bowling ==
Brazil qualified a full team of four athletes (two men and two women).

Athlete	Event	Qualification / Final														Round robin											Semifinal	Final / BM	
Athlete	Event	Block 1						Block 2						Total	Rank	Round robin											Semifinal	Final / BM	
Athlete	Event	1	2	3	4	5	6	7	8	9	10	11	12	Total	Rank	1	2	3	4	5	6	7	8	Total	Grand total	Rank	Opposition Result	Opposition Result	Rank
Bruno Soares Costa	Men's singles	225	215	178	200	154	255	191	246	234	226	234	245	2603	16	did not advance													
Marcelo Suartz	Men's singles	279	220	246	236	184	216	159	300	214	240	247	231	2772	5 Q	211	279	214	233	233	209	177	241	1857	4629	3 Q	Perez (PUR); W 234–213	Pate (USA); L 189–190	2nd place, silver medalist(s)
Bruno Soares Costa; Marcelo Suartz	Men's doubles	463	343	411	357	383	402	360	424	434	483	406	417	4883	13	—N/a													
Stephanie Migliore Dubbio	Women's singles	184	175	215	153	171	212	232	217	171	227	224	224	2405	14	did not advance													
Roberta Camargo Rodrigues	Women's singles	205	211	189	197	202	211	178	197	154	257	190	213	2404	15	did not advance													
Stephanie Migliore Dubbio; Roberta Camargo Rodrigues	Women's doubles	444	369	370	340	423	317	359	447	362	340	409	448	4628	11	—N/a													

== Boxing ==
Brazil qualified eight boxers (five men and three women).

Men

Athlete	Event	Quarterfinal	Semifinal	Final	
Athlete	Event	Opposition Result	Opposition Result	Opposition Result	Rank
Ronaldo Bezerra da Silva	–49 kg	Kevin Adonis Arias (NCA); L 2 – 3	did not advance		
Hebert Conceição	–75 kg	Francisco Daniel Veron (ARG); W 3 – 2	Troy Isley (USA); W 4 – 1	Arlen Lopez Cardona (CUB); L 0 – 5	2nd place, silver medalist(s)
Keno Machado	–81 kg	David O'Reilly (CAN); W 5 – 0	Rogelio Romero Torres (MEX); W 5 – 0	Julio César La Cruz (CUB); L 0 – 5	2nd place, silver medalist(s)
Abner Teixeira	–91 kg	Joaquin Berroa Lugo (DOM); W 5 – 0	Erislandy Savón (CUB); L 2 – 3	DNA	3rd place, bronze medalist(s)
Cosme Henrique Nascimento	+91 kg	Dainier Christi Jústiz (CUB); L 0 – 5	did not advance		

Women

Athlete	Event	Quarterfinal	Semifinal	Final	
Athlete	Event	Opposition Result	Opposition Result	Opposition Result	Rank
Jucielen Romeu	–57 kg	Keyling Vanessa Reyes (NCA); W KO	Yarisel Ramirez (USA); W 5 – 0	Leonela Sanchez (ARG); L 1 – 4	2nd place, silver medalist(s)
Beatriz Ferreira	–60 kg	Esperanza Ipanaque (PER); W 5 – 0	Rashida Ellis (USA); W 3 – 2	Dayana Sanchez (ARG); W 5 – 0	1st place, gold medalist(s)
Flávia Figueiredo	–75 kg	Fredly Gabriela Guitierrez (NCA); W 5 – 0	Naomi Graham (USA); L 2 – 3	Did not advance	3rd place, bronze medalist(s)

== Canoeing ==
=== Slalom ===
Brazil qualified a total of six slalom athletes (three men and three women).

Athlete	Event	Preliminary round			Semifinal		Final	
Athlete	Event	Run 1	Run 2	Rank	Time	Rank	Time	Rank
Felipe Borges	Men's C-1	88.94	84.79	1 Q	95.13	3 Q	91.39	3rd place, bronze medalist(s)
Pedro Gonçalves da Silva	Men's K-1	77.52	82.77	1 Q	88.62	1 Q	85.81	1st place, gold medalist(s)
Pedro Gonçalves da Silva	Men's EK-1		—N/a	1 Q		1 Q		1st place, gold medalist(s)
Ana Sátila	Women's C-1	93.38	97.92	1 Q	96.88	1 Q	95.35	1st place, gold medalist(s)
Omira Estácia Neta	Women's K-1	92.07	92.59	2 Q	97.72	2 Q	150.74	5
Ana Sátila	Women's EK-1		—N/a	1 Q		1 Q		1st place, gold medalist(s)

=== Sprint ===
Brazil qualified a total of 10 sprint athletes (six men and four women).

Men

Athlete	Event	Heat		Semifinal		Final	
Athlete	Event	Time	Rank	Time	Rank	Time	Rank
Isaquias Queiroz	C-1 1000 m	4:00.985	1	—N/a		3:47.631	1st place, gold medalist(s)
Isaquias Queiroz; Erlon Silva	C-2 1000 m	—N/a				DNF	DNF
Edson Silva	K-1 200 m	36.189	2	—N/a		36.946	4
Vagner Souta	K-1 1000 m	3:41.095	3	—N/a		3:35.960	3rd place, bronze medalist(s)
Edson Silva; Vagner Souta	K-2 1000 m	3:26.081	4	3:30.467	2	3:24.309	6
Edson Silva; Patrick Faustino; Pedro Henrique da Costa; Vagner Souta	K-4 500 m	—N/a				1:25.436	6

Women

Athlete	Event	Heat		Semifinal		Final	
Athlete	Event	Time	Rank	Time	Rank	Time	Rank
Valdenice Conceição	C-1 200 m	46.715	2	—N/a		48.054	4
Andrea Oliveira; Angela Silva	C-2 500 m	—N/a				2:08.178	4
Ana Paula Vergutz	K-1 200 m	42.711	4	40.746	2	44.361	4
Ana Paula Vergutz	K-1 500 m	1:57.295	1	—N/a		1:54.294	3rd place, bronze medalist(s)

== Cycling ==
Brazil has qualified 16 athletes: 10 men and 6 women. The team was officially announced on June 4, 2019.

=== BMX ===
Freestyle

Athlete	Event	Seeding		Final	
Athlete	Event	Points	Rank	Points	Rank
Cauan Nascimento	Men	64.33	7	73.67	6
Derlayne Roque	Women	51.67	7	48.00	7

Racing

Athlete	Event	Ranking round		Quarterfinal		Semifinal		Final	
Athlete	Event	Time	Rank	Points	Rank	Time	Rank	Time	Rank
Renato Rezende	Men	33.698	7	5	2 Q	9	3 Q	32.957	4
Anderson de Souza Filho	Men	33.588	4	7	2 Q	10	4 Q	32.493	2nd place, silver medalist(s)
Priscilla Carnaval	Women	38.770	4	—N/a		6	2 Q	38.122	4
Paola Reis	Women	38.367	2	—N/a		5	1 Q	37.583	2nd place, silver medalist(s)

=== Mountain ===
Athlete	Event	Time	Rank
Henrique Avancini	Men's Cross-country	1:27:08	2nd place, silver medalist(s)
Guilherme Gotardelo Muller	Men's Cross-country	1:30:36	5
Jaqueline Mourão	Women's Cross-country	1:31:12	3rd place, bronze medalist(s)

=== Road ===
Men

Athlete	Event	Time	Rank
Magno Nazaret	Road race	did not finish	
Rodrigo do Nascimento	Road race	4:09:19	27
Magno Nazaret	Time trial	46:17.44	2nd place, silver medalist(s)
Rodrigo do Nascimento	Time trial	48:49.65	13

=== Track ===
Men

Sprint

Athlete	Event	Qualification		Round of 16	Repechage 1	Quarterfinals	Semifinals	Final	
Athlete	Event	Time	Rank	Opposition Time	Opposition Time	Opposition Result	Opposition Result	Opposition Result	Rank
Flavio Cipriano	Men's individual	10.546	13	did not advance					
Kacio Freitas	Men's individual	10.226	7 Q	Canelón (VEN); L	Wammes (CAN); Sanchez (VEN); 1st place	Paul (TTO); L	Did not advance	Race for 5th–8th place Tjon En Fa (SUR); Ramírez (COL); Bottasso (ARG)	5 DSQ
João Vitor da Silva; Flavio Cipriano; Kacio Freitas	Men's team	45.279	3 QB	—N/a				Bronze final Osuna (MEX); Landa (MEX); Teran (MEX); W	(bronze) DSQ

Keirin

Athlete	Event	Heats	Repechage	Final
Athlete	Event	Rank	Rank	Rank
Kacio Fonseca	Men's	3	3	8

Women

Madison

Athlete	Event	Points	Rank
Daniela Lionço; Wellyda Rodrigues	Women's	11	5

Omnium

Athlete	Event	Scratch race		Tempo race		Elimination race		Points race		Total	
Athlete	Event	Points	Rank	Points	Rank	Points	Rank	Points	Rank	Points	Rank
Wellyda Rodrigues	Women's	28	7	16	13	16	28	8	2	74	10

== Diving ==
Brazil qualified a full team of eight divers (four men and four women).

Men

Athlete	Event	Preliminary		Final	
Athlete	Event	Score	Rank	Score	Rank
Ian Matos	1 m springboard	304.10	10 Q	314.75	11
Kawan Pereira	1 m springboard	309.00	9 Q	343.00	9
Ian Matos	3 m springboard	381.15	10 Q	418.90	7
Luis Felipe Bonfim	3 m springboard	385.75	9 Q	353.55	12
Isaac Souza	10 m platform	415.70	6 Q	406.45	8
Kawan Pereira	10 m platform	369.00	11 Q	384.90	11
Luis Felipe Bonfim; Kawan Pereira	3 m synchronized springboard	—N/a		335.49	8
Kawan Pereira; Isaac Souza	10 m synchronized platform	—N/a		375.81	3rd place, bronze medalist(s)

Women

Athlete	Event	Preliminary		Final	
Athlete	Event	Score	Rank	Score	Rank
Luana Moreira	1 m springboard	249.70	3 Q	253.55	7
Juliana Veloso	1 m springboard	232.30	7 Q	241.30	9
Luana Moreira	3 m springboard	289.65	5 Q	296.45	6
Juliana Veloso	3 m springboard	234.80	12 Q	246.85	11
Andressa Bonfim	10 m platform	263.70	9 Q	233.20	9
Ingrid Oliveira	10 m platform	302.55	7 Q	257.90	8
Luana Moreira; Juliana Veloso	3 m synchronized springboard	—N/a		232.29	6

== Equestrian ==
Brazil qualified a full team of 12 equestrians (four per discipline).

=== Dressage ===
Athlete	Horse	Event	Qualification						Grand Prix Freestyle / Intermediate I Freestyle	
Athlete	Horse	Event	Grand Prix / Prix St. Georges		Grand Prix Special / Intermediate I		Total		Grand Prix Freestyle / Intermediate I Freestyle	
Athlete	Horse	Event	Score	Rank	Score	Rank	Score	Rank	Score	Rank
João Victor Marcari Oliva	Biso das Lezirias	Individual	66.618	17	65.029	23	131.647	19 Q	70.665	12
Pedro de Almeida	Aoleo	Individual	64.826	25	65.660	20	130.486	23	did not advance	
Leandro da Silva	Dicaprio	Individual	67.326	14	66.298	16	133.624	16 Q	71.420	11
João Paulo dos Santos	Carthago Comando SN	Individual	69.029	10	69.265	9	138.294	9 Q	72.685	8
João Victor Marcari Oliva; Pedro de Almeida; Leandro da Silva; João Paulo dos Santos	As above	Team	204.473	3	204.223	3	408.696	3rd place, bronze medalist(s)	—N/a	

=== Eventing ===
Athlete	Horse	Event	Dressage		Cross-country		Jumping		Total	
Athlete	Horse	Event	Points	Rank	Points	Rank	Points	Rank	Points	Rank
Ruy Fonseca	Ballypatrick SRS	Individual	31.80	12	Eliminated		did not advance			
Rafael Losano	Fuiloda G	Individual	33.00	14	4.40	3	0.40	10	37.80	6
Carlos Parro	Quaikin Qurious	Individual	28.10	8	6.80	4	0.00	1	34.90	3rd place, bronze medalist(s)
Marcelo Tosi	Starbucks	Individual	26.00	3	19.80	12	4.00	11	49.40	7
Ruy Fonseca; Rafael Losano; Carlos Parro; Marcelo Tosi	As above	Team	85.90	3	30.60	2	4.40	3	122.10	2nd place, silver medalist(s)

=== Jumping ===
Athlete	Horse	Event	Qualification								Final					
Athlete	Horse	Event	Round 1		Round 2		Round 3		Total		Round A		Round B		Total	
Athlete	Horse	Event	Faults	Rank	Faults	Rank	Faults	Rank	Faults	Rank	Faults	Rank	Faults	Rank	Faults	Rank
Rodrigo Lambre	Chacciama	Individual	1.26	7	4	9	0	1	5.26	3 Q	Withdrew					
Eduardo Menezes	H5 Chaganus	Individual	1.07	5	8	15	8	16	17.07	16	did not advance					
Pedro Veniss	Quabri de l'Isle	Individual	1.06	4	0	1	1	7	2.06	1 Q	4	9 Q	1	5	5	7
Marlon Zanotelli	Sirene de la Motte	Individual	1.60	11	0	1	4	9	5.6	5 Q	0	4 Q	0	1	0	1st place, gold medalist(s)
Rodrigo Lambre; Eduardo Menezes; Pedro Veniss; Marlon Zanotelli	As above	Team	3.39	2	4	1	5	1	12.39	1st place, gold medalist(s)	—N/a					

== Fencing ==
Brazil qualified 15 fencers (9 men, 6 women). The team was officially announced on June 5, 2019.

Men

Athlete	Event	Pool Round		Round of 16	Quarterfinals	Semifinals	Final / BM	
Athlete	Event	Result	Seed	Opposition Score	Opposition Score	Opposition Score	Opposition Score	Rank
Athos Schwantes	Individual épée	3W-2L	9	Dominguez (ARG); W 15 – 10	Limardo (VEN); L 4 – 15	did not advance		
Nicolas Ferreira	Individual épée	2W-3L	14	Limardo (VEN); L 11 – 15	did not advance			
Athos Schwantes; Nicolas Ferreira; Alexandre Camargo	Team épée	—N/a			Cuba; L 37–45	Peru; W 45–27	Mexico; W 45–33	5
Guilherme Toldo	Individual foil	3W-2L	7	Alarcón (CHI); L 12 – 15	did not advance			
Heitor Shimbo	Individual foil	3W-2L	8	Servello (ARG); L 7 – 15	did not advance			
Guilherme Toldo; Heitor Shimbo; Henrique Marques	Team foil	—N/a			Mexico; W 45–31	Canada; W 45–43	United States; L 23–45	2nd place, silver medalist(s)
Bruno Pekelman	Individual sabre	3W-2L	7	Gordon (CAN); L 10 – 15	did not advance			
Enzo Bergamo	Individual sabre	0W-5L	16	did not advance				
Bruno Pekelman; Enzo Bergamo; Henrique Garrigos	Team sabre	—N/a			Colombia; L 37–45	Peru; W 45–27	Argentina; L 25–45	6

Women

Athlete	Event	Pool Round		Round of 16	Quarterfinals	Semifinals	Final / BM	
Athlete	Event	Result	Seed	Opposition Score	Opposition Score	Opposition Score	Opposition Score	Rank
Nathalie Moellhausen	Individual épée	4W-1L	3	Netto (BRA); W 15 – 9	Mendoza (CUB); W 15 – 5	Holmes (USA); L 9 – 15	Did not advance	3rd place, bronze medalist(s)
Amanda Netto Simeão	Individual épée	1W-4L	14	Moellhausen (BRA); L 9 – 15	did not advance			
Nathalie Moellhausen; Victoria Vizeu; Amanda Netto Simeão	Team épée	—N/a			Mexico; W 45–31	Cuba; L 37–45	Venezuela; L 37–45	4
Bia Bulcão	Individual foil	2W-3L	12	Gil (PER); W 15 – 13	Michel (MEX); W 15 – 13	Kiefer (USA); L 3 – 15	did not advance	3rd place, bronze medalist(s)
Gabriela Cécchini	Individual foil	2W-3L	11	Dubrovich (USA); W 15 – 13	Guo (CAN); L 6 – 15	did not advance		
Bia Bulcão; Gabriela Cécchini; Mariana Pistoia	Team foil	—N/a			Mexico; L 34–45	Peru; W 45–16	Cuba; W 45–28	5

== Golf ==
Brazil qualified a full team of four golfers (two men and two women). The team was officially announced on June 4, 2019.

Athlete	Event	Round 1	Round 2	Round 3	Round 4	Total		
Athlete	Event	Score	Score	Score	Score	Score	Par	Rank
Adilson da Silva	Men's individual	75	71	71	67	284	E	20
Alexandre Rocha	Men's individual	70	69	73	67	279	5	14
Luiza Altmann	Women's individual	76	79	74	73	302	+18	23
Nina Rissi	Women's individual	72	72	77	75	296	+12	17
Adilson da Silva; Alexandre Rocha; Luiza Altmann; Nina Rissi	Mixed team	142	141	145	140	568	E	12

== Gymnastics ==
=== Artistic ===
Brazil qualified a team of ten gymnasts in artistic (five men and five women).

Men
Team & Individual Qualification

Athlete	Event	Final							
Athlete	Event	Apparatus						Total	Rank
Athlete	Event	F	PH	R	V	PB	HB	Total	Rank
Arthur Nory	Team	13.750 (5) Q	12.250 (21)	13.250 (14)	14.250	14.300 (5) Q	14.400 (1) Q	82.200	2 Q
Arthur Zanetti	Team	13.650 (7) Q	—N/a	15.000 (1) Q	14.200	—N/a	—N/a	42.850	—N/a
Caio Souza	Team	12.700 (28)	11.800 (26)	13.800 (8) Q	14.550	14.850 (1) Q	13.850 (3)	81.550	5 Q
Francisco Barretto Júnior	Team	—N/a	13.950 (5) Q	—N/a	—N/a	14.000 (8)	14.050 (2) Q	42.000	—N/a
Luís Guilherme Porto	Team	13.450 (15)	12.550 (16)	13.000 (19)	14.300 (3) Q	13.050 (22)	11.500 (42)	77.850	
Total	Team	40.850	38.750	42.050	43.100	43.150	42.300	250.450	1st place, gold medalist(s)

Qualification Legend: Q = Qualified to apparatus final

Individual finals

Athlete	Event	Apparatus						Total	
Athlete	Event	F	PH	R	V	PB	HB	Score	Rank
Arthur Nory	All-around	14.050	12.950	13.050	14.650	13.850	14.400	82.950	2nd place, silver medalist(s)
Caio Souza	All-around	13.600	12.950	14.250	14.600	13.700	14.400	83.500	1st place, gold medalist(s)
Arthur Nory	Floor	13.966	—N/a					13.966	4
Arthur Zanetti	Floor	13.733	—N/a					13.733	7
Francisco Barretto	Pommel horse	—N/a	13.533	—N/a				13.533	1st place, gold medalist(s)
Caio Souza	Rings	—N/a		14.066	—N/a			14.066	4
Arthur Zanetti	Rings	—N/a		14.400	—N/a			14.400	2nd place, silver medalist(s)
Luís Guilherme Porto	Vault	—N/a			13.650	—N/a		13.650	7
Francisco Barretto	Parallel bars	—N/a				13.033	—N/a	13.033	8
Caio Souza	Parallel bars	—N/a				14.366	—N/a	14.366	2nd place, silver medalist(s)
Francisco Barretto	Horizontal bar	—N/a					14.566	14.566	1st place, gold medalist(s)
Arthur Nory	Horizontal bar	—N/a					14.533	14.533	2nd place, silver medalist(s)

Women
Team & Individual Qualification

Athlete	Event	Final					
Athlete	Event	Apparatus				Total	Rank
Athlete	Event	V	UB	BB	F	Total	Rank
Carolyne Pedro	Team	13.450	13.150 (8) Q	11.950 (19)	12.800 (16)	51.350	10
Flavia Saraiva	Team	14.500	12.800 (14)	12.900 (8) Q	13.800 (3) Q	54.000	5 Q
Jade Barbosa	Team	—N/a	—N/a	—N/a	—N/a	—N/a	—N/a
Lorrane Oliveira	Team	—N/a	14.000 (5) Q	—N/a	—N/a	14.000	—N/a
Thais Fidelis	Team	13.550	12.950 (11)	12.200 (16)	13.300 (7) Q	52.000	7 Q
Total	Team	41.500	40.100	37.050	39.900	158.550	3rd place, bronze medalist(s)

Qualification Legend: Q = Qualified to apparatus final

Individual finals

Athlete	Event	Apparatus				Total	
Athlete	Event	V	UB	BB	F	Score	Rank
Thais Fidelis	All-around	13.700	12.750	13.000	13.250	52.700	6
Flávia Saraiva	All-around	14.150	12.800	13.500	13.900	54.350	3rd place, bronze medalist(s)
Lorrane Oliveira	Uneven bars	—N/a	13.833	—N/a		13.833	4
Carolyne Pedro	Uneven bars	—N/a	12.766	—N/a		12.766	7
Flávia Saraiva	Balance beam	—N/a		12.300	—N/a	12.300	5
Thais Fidelis	Floor	—N/a			12.966	12.966	7
Flávia Saraiva	Floor	—N/a			13.766	13.766	3rd place, bronze medalist(s)

=== Rhythmic ===
Brazil qualified two individual gymnasts and five gymnasts for the group event in rhythmic (seven women).

Individual

Athlete	Event	Apparatus				Total	
Athlete	Event	Ball	Clubs	Hoop	Ribbon	Score	Rank
Bárbara Domingos	All-around	15.650	16.450	17.750	17.300	67.150	4
Natália Gaudio	All-around	14.500	17.800	18.300	16.550	67.150	3rd place, bronze medalist(s)
Bárbara Domingos	Ball	17.200	—N/a			17.200	4
Bárbara Domingos	Clubs	—N/a	16.600	—N/a		16.600	5
Natália Gaudio	Clubs	—N/a	17.250	—N/a		17.250	4
Bárbara Domingos	Hoop	—N/a		16.650	—N/a	16.650	5
Natália Gaudio	Hoop	—N/a		14.550	—N/a	14.550	8
Bárbara Domingos	Ribbon	—N/a			17.450	17.450	2nd place, silver medalist(s)
Natália Gaudio	Ribbon	—N/a			13.550	13.550	8

Group

Athlete	Event	Apparatus		Total	
Athlete	Event	5 balls	3 hoops + 2 clubs	Score	Rank
Vitória Guerra; Beatriz Linhares; Débora Medrado; Nicole Pircio; Camila Rossi	All-around	23.650	19.700	43.350	3rd place, bronze medalist(s)
Vitória Guerra; Beatriz Linhares; Débora Medrado; Nicole Pircio; Camila Rossi	5 balls	22.500	—N/a	22.500	3rd place, bronze medalist(s)
Vitória Guerra; Beatriz Linhares; Débora Medrado; Nicole Pircio; Camila Rossi	3 hoops + 2 clubs	—N/a	24.250	24.250	1st place, gold medalist(s)

=== Trampoline ===
Brazil qualified three gymnasts in trampoline (one man and two women).

Athlete	Event	Qualification		Final	
Athlete	Event	Score	Rank	Score	Rank
Rayan Victor Dutra	Men's	103.440	4 Q	55.125	5
Alice Hellen Gomes	Women's	52.320	11	did not advance	
Camilla Lopes Gomes	Women's	99.375	2 Q	11.490	8

== Handball ==
Brazil qualified a men's team (of 14 athletes) by winning the 2018 South American Games.

Brazil qualified a women's team (of 14 athletes) by winning the 2018 South American Games.

Summary

Team	Event	Group stage				Semifinal	Final / BM	
Team	Event	Opposition Result	Opposition Result	Opposition Result	Rank	Opposition Result	Opposition Result	Rank
Brazil men	Men's tournament	Mexico; W 33–23	Peru; W 40–16	Puerto Rico; W 35–26	1 Q	Chile; L 29–32	Mexico; W 32–20	3rd place, bronze medalist(s)
Brazil women	Women's tournament	Cuba; W 29–20	Canada; W 41–12	Puerto Rico; W 40–16	1 Q	United States; W 34–9	Argentina; W 30–21	1st place, gold medalist(s)

=== Men's tournament ===
Pos	Team	Pld	W	D	L	GF	GA	GD	Pts	Qualification
1	Brazil	3	3	0	0	108	65	+43	6	Semifinals
2	Mexico	3	2	0	1	81	69	+12	4	Semifinals
3	Puerto Rico	3	1	0	2	72	82	−10	2	5–8th place semifinals
4	Peru (H)	3	0	0	3	56	101	−45	0	5–8th place semifinals

Source: Lima 2019
Rules for classification: 1) points; 2) head-to-head points; 3) head-to-head goal difference; 4) head-to-head goals scored; 5) goal difference; 6) goals scored; 7) draw.
(H) Hosts

31 July 2019; 18:00	Brazil	33–23	Mexico	Villa Deportiva Nacional; Referees: Zuñiga, Reyes (CUB)
31 July 2019; 18:00	Borges 9	(18–10)	Al. Villalobos 8	Villa Deportiva Nacional; Referees: Zuñiga, Reyes (CUB)
31 July 2019; 18:00	1× (yellow card) 7× (suspension)	Report	1× (suspension)	Villa Deportiva Nacional; Referees: Zuñiga, Reyes (CUB)

1 August 2019; 18:00	Peru	16–40	Brazil	Villa Deportiva Nacional; Referees: Pineda, Estrada (COL)
1 August 2019; 18:00	Velez 4	(7–27)	Chiuffa 10	Villa Deportiva Nacional; Referees: Pineda, Estrada (COL)
1 August 2019; 18:00	2× (suspension)	Report	2× (yellow card) 5× (suspension)	Villa Deportiva Nacional; Referees: Pineda, Estrada (COL)

2 August 2019; 20:30	Brazil	35–26	Puerto Rico	Villa Deportiva Nacional; Referees: Lenci, López (ARG)
2 August 2019; 20:30	Nantes 9	(18–13)	Ceballos, Nazario 7	Villa Deportiva Nacional; Referees: Lenci, López (ARG)
2 August 2019; 20:30	1× (yellow card) 6× (suspension)	Report	1× (yellow card) 5× (suspension)	Villa Deportiva Nacional; Referees: Lenci, López (ARG)

Semifinal

4 August 2019; 18:00	Brazil	29–32	Chile	Villa Deportiva Nacional; Referees: Raluy, Sabroso (ESP)
4 August 2019; 18:00	Langaro 8	(15–18)	Ayala 7	Villa Deportiva Nacional; Referees: Raluy, Sabroso (ESP)
4 August 2019; 18:00	1× (yellow card) 4× (suspension)	Report	2× (yellow card) 3× (suspension)	Villa Deportiva Nacional; Referees: Raluy, Sabroso (ESP)

Bronze medal match

5 August 2019; 18:00	Brazil	32–20	Mexico	Villa Deportiva Nacional; Referees: Lenci, López (ARG)
5 August 2019; 18:00	four players 5	(16–10)	Sandoval 6	Villa Deportiva Nacional; Referees: Lenci, López (ARG)
5 August 2019; 18:00	2× (yellow card) 3× (suspension)	Report	1× (yellow card) 1× (suspension)	Villa Deportiva Nacional; Referees: Lenci, López (ARG)

=== Women's tournament ===
Pos	Team	Pld	W	D	L	GF	GA	GD	Pts	Qualification
1	Brazil	3	3	0	0	110	48	+62	6	Semifinals
2	Cuba	3	2	0	1	75	68	+7	4	Semifinals
3	Puerto Rico	3	1	0	2	63	76	−13	2	5–8th place semifinals
4	Canada	3	0	0	3	36	92	−56	0	5–8th place semifinals

Source: Lima 2019
Rules for classification: 1) points; 2) head-to-head points; 3) head-to-head goal difference; 4) head-to-head goals scored; 5) goal difference; 6) goals scored; 7) draw.

24 July 2019; 20:30	Brazil	29−20	Cuba	Villa Deportiva Nacional; Referees: Raluy, Sabroso (ESP)
24 July 2019; 20:30	De Paula 6	(13−9)	Rizo 4	Villa Deportiva Nacional; Referees: Raluy, Sabroso (ESP)
24 July 2019; 20:30	1× (yellow card) 4× (suspension)	Report	1× (yellow card) 4× (suspension)	Villa Deportiva Nacional; Referees: Raluy, Sabroso (ESP)

25 July 2019; 20:30	Canada	12−41	Brazil	Villa Deportiva Nacional; Referees: Pineda, Estrada (COL)
25 July 2019; 20:30	four players 2	(5−20)	Castro 10	Villa Deportiva Nacional; Referees: Pineda, Estrada (COL)
25 July 2019; 20:30	2× (yellow card) 4× (suspension)	Report	1× (yellow card) 1× (suspension)	Villa Deportiva Nacional; Referees: Pineda, Estrada (COL)

27 July 2019; 18:00	Brazil	40–16	Puerto Rico	Villa Deportiva Nacional; Referees: Sosa, Lemes (URU)
27 July 2019; 18:00	Belo 8	(20–10)	Ceballos, García 4	Villa Deportiva Nacional; Referees: Sosa, Lemes (URU)
27 July 2019; 18:00	1× (yellow card) 5× (suspension)	Report	1× (yellow card) 3× (suspension) 1× (red card)	Villa Deportiva Nacional; Referees: Sosa, Lemes (URU)

Semifinal

29 July 2019; 20:30	Brazil	34–9	United States	Villa Deportiva Nacional; Referees: Pineda, Estrada (COL)
29 July 2019; 20:30	Castro 8	(15–3)	Rhoads 5	Villa Deportiva Nacional; Referees: Pineda, Estrada (COL)
29 July 2019; 20:30	1× (yellow card) 2× (suspension)	Report	1× (yellow card) 2× (suspension)	Villa Deportiva Nacional; Referees: Pineda, Estrada (COL)

Final

30 July 2019; 20:30	Argentina	21–30	Brazil	Villa Deportiva Nacional; Referees: Sosa, Lemes (URU)
30 July 2019; 20:30	Karsten 4	(12–12)	Amorim, Fachinello 5	Villa Deportiva Nacional; Referees: Sosa, Lemes (URU)
30 July 2019; 20:30	1× (yellow card) 1× (suspension)	Report	4× (yellow card) 5× (suspension)	Villa Deportiva Nacional; Referees: Sosa, Lemes (URU)

== Judo ==
Brazil has qualified a full team of fourteen judokas (seven men and seven women). The team was officially announced on May 27, 2019.

Men

Athlete	Event	Round of 16	Quarterfinals	Semifinals	Repechage	Final / BM	
Athlete	Event	Opposition Result	Opposition Result	Opposition Result	Opposition Result	Opposition Result	Rank
Renan Torres	−60 kg	—N/a	Diaz (USA); W 10S1-01	Almenares (CUB); W 11-00	—N/a	Preciado (ECU); W 01S1-00S1	1st place, gold medalist(s)
Daniel Cargnin	−66 kg	—N/a	Castillo (MEX); W 10S2-0OS3	Valderrama (VEN); W 10S2-00	—N/a	Mateo (DOM); L 00S1-01S2	2nd place, silver medalist(s)
Jeferson Santos Junior	−73 kg	—N/a	Mattey (VEN); L 00-01S2	Did not advance	Navarro (COL); W 10S1-00S3	Eduardo Araújo (MEX); W 10S1-00	3rd place, bronze medalist(s)
Eduardo Yudy	−81 kg	—N/a	Vega (ARG); W 01-00S2	Hatton (USA); W 10-00S2	—N/a	del Orbe (DOM); W 10-00	1st place, gold medalist(s)
Rafael Macedo	−90 kg	—N/a	Elnahas (CAN); W 10-00	Silva (CUB); L 00S3-10S1	—N/a	Galarreta (PER); L 00S1-11	5
David Moura	+100 kg	—N/a	Solis (CHI); W 01-00S1	Granda (CUB); L 00S2-10S2	—N/a	Tadehara (USA); W 10-00S1	3rd place, bronze medalist(s)

Women

Athlete	Event	Round of 16	Quarterfinals	Semifinals	Repechage	Final / BM	
Athlete	Event	Opposition Result	Opposition Result	Opposition Result	Opposition Result	Opposition Result	Rank
Larissa Farias	−48 kg	Solís (ARG); W 11-00	Pareto (ARG); L 00S2-01S1	Did not advance	Suzuki (USA); W 01-00	Vargas (CHI); L 00S2-01S2	5
Larissa Pimenta	−52 kg	—N/a	Jesus (DOM); W 10-00S1	Gamarra (PER); W 10-00S3	—N/a	Olvera (MEX); W 10S1-00S3	1st place, gold medalist(s)
Rafaela Silva	−57 kg	—N/a	Fulgentes (USA); W 10-00S3	Dorvigny (CUB); W 10-00	—N/a	Rosa (DOM); W 11-00	(gold) DSQ
Aléxia Castilhos	−63 kg	—N/a	Martin (USA); W 01S2-00S2	Barrios (VEN); L 00-10	—N/a	García (ECU); W 01S1-00S1	3rd place, bronze medalist(s)
Ellen Santana	−70 kg	—N/a	Rodriguez (VEN); L 01-00S2	Did not advance	Drysdale (JAM); L 00-10S1	Did not advance	7
Mayra Aguiar	−78 kg	—N/a	Papadakis (USA); W 10-00	León (VEN); W 10-00	—N/a	Antomarchi (CUB); W 10S1-00S1	1st place, gold medalist(s)
Beatriz Souza	+78 kg	—N/a	Martinez (MEX); W 10-00	Mojica (PUR); W 00S1-01S2	—N/a	Marenco (NCA); W 10-00S2	3rd place, bronze medalist(s)

== Karate ==
Brazil qualified a team of 15 karatekas (seven men and eight women).

Kumite (sparring)

Athlete	Event	Round robin				Semifinal	Final	
Athlete	Event	Opposition Result	Opposition Result	Opposition Result	Rank	Opposition Result	Opposition Result	Rank
Douglas Brose	Men's −60 kg	Rendón (COL); T 0–0	Farah (ARG); W 1–0	Larrosa (URU); T 1–1	2 Q	Martinez (VEN); W 8–4	Lavín (CHI); L 0–2	2nd place, silver medalist(s)
Vinicius Figueira	Men's −67 kg	Ferreras (DOM); W 6–0	Lindelauf (ARU); W 8–0	Rodríguez (MEX); W 1–0	1 Q	Velozo (CHI); L 4–7	Did not advance	3rd place, bronze medalist(s)
Hernani Veríssimo	Men's −75 kg	Scott (USA); L 1–4	Landázuri (COL); W 2–0	Valdivia (PER); W 7–0	2 Q	Maldonado (GUA); W 4–2	Scott (USA); L 1–2	2nd place, silver medalist(s)
Jessica Linhares	Women's −50 kg	Rodríguez (PER); W 5–3	Benítez (ARG); W 6–0	Nishi (USA); L 0–1	2 Q	Hernández (MEX); L 1–2	Did not advance	3rd place, bronze medalist(s)
Valéria Kumizaki	Women's −55 kg	Borzelli (PAN); W 1–0	Flores (MEX); L 0–1	Aros (CHI); T 0–0	2 Q	Torres (CUB); W 3–0	Campbell (CAN); W 4–1	1st place, gold medalist(s)
Érica Carla Santos	Women's −61 kg	Sequera (VEN); T 0–0	Grande (PER); W 3–0	Factos (ECU); L 0–5	3	did not advance		
Gabrielle Sepe	Women's −68 kg	Murphy (USA); L 0–1	Cuervo (VEN); L 1–6	Mosquera (COL); L 1–7	4	did not advance		

Kata (forms)

Athlete	Event	Pool round 1		Pool round 2		Final / BM	
Athlete	Event	Score	Rank	Score	Rank	Opposition Result	Rank
Williames Souza	Men's individual	22.26	4	did not advance			
Nicole Mota	Women's individual	23.32	3 Q	24.14	3	Aranda (PER); L 24.68–24.86	5
Guilherme Augusto da Silva; Lucas Silva; Victor Yonamine	Team kata	23.86	2 Q	—N/a		Hernandez / Lira / Sanchez (NCA); W 24.42–0.00	3rd place, bronze medalist(s)
Carolaini Zefino; Izabel Vieira; Sabrina Zefino	Team kata	23.00	2 Q	—N/a		Pachon / Moreno / Muñoz (COL); W 24.06–23.74	3rd place, bronze medalist(s)

== Modern pentathlon ==
Brazil qualified five modern pentathletes (two men and three women).

Athlete	Event	Fencing (Épée one touch)				Swimming (200 m freestyle)			Riding (Show jumping)			Shooting / Running (10 m laser pistol / 3000 m cross-country)			Total	
Athlete	Event	V – D	Rank	MP points	BP	Time	Rank	MP points	Penalties	Rank	MP points	Time	Rank	MP points	MP points	Rank
Danilo Fagundes	Men's individual	19–12	8	230	1	2:09.78	15	291	91.90	19	253	11:22.00	11	618	1392	12
Felipe Nascimento	Men's individual	20–11	5	236	0	2:06.60	8	297	67.80	10	279	11:24.00	12	616	1428	7
Danilo Fagundes; Felipe Nascimento	Men's relay	15–11	=6	226	1	1:56:10	4	318	52	5	248	10:29:00	1	671	1463	4
Isabela Abreu	Women's individual	19–12	11	229	0	2:22.99	6	266	77.41	12	273	13:02.00	9	518	1286	6
Maria Ieda Guimarães	Women's individual	22–9	5	250	0	2:29.68	18	251	69.05	3	293	13:07.00	11	513	1307	4
Priscila Oliveira	Women's individual	15–16	16	204	3	2:19.98	3	271	96.84	13	265	13:28.00	14	492	1232	11
Isabela Abreu; Priscila Oliveira	Women's relay	27–13	=1	245	3	2:09:01	2	292	135.04	3	230	12:55:00	5	525	1292	3rd place, bronze medalist(s)
Maria Ieda Guimarães; Felipe Nascimento	Mixed relay	28–20	5	228	2	2:04.83	6	301	101.38	1	295	11:41:00	4	599	1399	5

== Roller sports ==
=== Figure ===
Brazil qualified a team of two athletes in figure skating (one man and one woman).

Athlete	Event	Short program		Long program		Total	
Athlete	Event	Score	Rank	Score	Rank	Score	Rank
Gustavo Casado	Men's	44.90	4	83.19	3	128.09	3rd place, bronze medalist(s)
Bruna Wurts	Women's	36.70	2	66.47	1	103.17	1st place, gold medalist(s)

=== Speed ===
Brazil qualified one male athlete in speed skating.

Athlete	Event	Preliminary		Semifinal		Final	
Athlete	Event	Time	Rank	Time	Rank	Time	Rank
Gabriel Félix e Silva	Men's 300 m time trial	—N/a				26.168	7
Gabriel Félix e Silva	Men's 500 m	45.177	3	did not advance			
Gabriel Félix e Silva	Men's 10,000 m elimination	—N/a				EL	9

== Rowing ==
Brazil qualified 14 boats, for a total of 20 rowers, at the 2018 Pan American Qualification Regatta.

Men

Athlete	Event	Heat		Repechage		Final	
Athlete	Event	Time	Rank	Time	Rank	Time	Rank
Uncas Batista	Single sculls	did not start					
Pau Vela Maggi; Xavier Vela Maggi	Pair	6:48.46	2 Q	—N/a		6:34.38	2nd place, silver medalist(s)
Uncas Tales Batista; Lucas Verthein	Double sculls	6:32.16	2	6:27.46	2 Q	6:29.72	3rd place, bronze medalist(s)
Alison Eráclito; Evaldo Becker	Lightweight double sculls	6:45.50	4	6:43.71	6	Did not start	10
Uncas Batista; Evaldo Becker; Ailson Eráclito; Lucas Verthein	Quadruple sculls	did not start					
Alef Fontoura; Willian Giaretton; Gabriel Moraes; Fábio José Moreira	Four	6:07.96	1 Q	—N/a		6:10.67	3rd place, bronze medalist(s)
Emanuel Borges; Renato Cataldo; Marcos Oscar de Oliveira; Vangelys Reinke	Lightweight four	6:11.02	2 Q	—N/a		6:08.06	4
Xavier Vela; Marcos Alves; Evaldo Becker; Willian Giaretton; Alef Fontoura; Fábio Moreira; Gabriel Campos; Pau Vela; Maurício de Abreu	Eight	6:05.88	1 Q	—N/a		5:48.21	4

Women

Athlete	Event	Heat		Repechage		Final	
Athlete	Event	Time	Rank	Time	Rank	Time	Rank
Milena Matias Viana	Single sculls	8:11.29	4	8:01.09	4	8:04.22	8
Vanessa Cozzi	Lightweight single sculls	8:00.32	2 Q	—N/a		7:57.38	5
Yanka Britto; Luana Gonçalves	Double sculls	7:31.32	5 Q	—N/a		7:35.31	5
Yanka Britto; Luana Gonçalves; Dayane Pacheco dos Santos; Milena Matias Viana	Quadruple sculls	6:51.43	3 Q	—N/a		6:45.01	5

== Rugby sevens ==
Brazil qualified a women's team (of 12 athletes) by winning the Women's competition at the 2018 South American Games.

Brazil qualified a men's team (of 12 athletes) after being finalist at the 2019 Sudamérica Rugby Sevens Olympic Qualifying Tournament.

Summary

Team	Event	Group stage				Semifinal	Final / BM / Pl.	
Team	Event	Opposition Result	Opposition Result	Opposition Result	Rank	Opposition Result	Opposition Result	Rank
Brazil men	Men's tournament	Chile; D 14–14	Guyana; W 59–0	United States; W 12–10	1 Q	Canada; L 5–35	United States; L 19–24	4
Brazil women	Women's tournament	Peru; W 33–5	Mexico; W 45–0	Canada; L 0–26	2 Q	United States; L 19–33	Colombia; L 24–29	4

=== Men's tournament ===
Pos	Team	Pld	W	D	L	PF	PA	PD	Pts	Qualification
1	Brazil	3	2	1	0	85	24	+61	8	Semifinals
2	United States	3	2	0	1	92	19	+73	7	Semifinals
3	Chile	3	1	1	1	108	41	+67	6	5–8th place semifinals
4	Guyana	3	0	0	3	7	208	−201	3	5–8th place semifinals

Source: Lima 2019
Rules for classification: 1) Points; 2) Head-to-head result; 3) Point difference; 4) Points scored; 5) draw.

26 July 2019
11:30

Brazil	14–14	Chile
Try: D. Sancery 1'c L. Duque 7'c Con: M. Duque (1/1) 2'; Reeves (1/1) 9'	Report	Try: Fernández 5'c Urroz 11'c Con: Fernández (1/1) 6'; Torrealba (1/1) 12'

Villa María del Triunfo Sports Center
Referee: Paulo Duarte (Portugal)

27 July 2019
11:50

Brazil	59–0	Guyana
Try: da Silva (2) 0'm, 5'c F. Sancery 2'c Giantorno 3'm Tenório 7'c Bourda-Couhet 7'c Reeves 9'c Massari 11'c Tranquez 13'c Con: Duque (2/4) 2', 5'; Giantorno (1/1) 7'; Reeves (4/4) 7', 9', 12', 14'	Report

Villa María del Triunfo Sports Center
Referee: Dale Hall (Canada)

27 July 2019
16:05

United States	10–12	Brazil
Try: Fuala'au 3'm Clark 6'm Con: Melphy (0/2)	Report	Try: da Silva 1'm Giantorno 11'c Con: Reeves (1/1) 12'; M. Duque (0/1)

Villa María del Triunfo Sports Center
Referee: Nehuen Jauri Rivero (Argentina)

Semifinal

28 July 2019
11:40

Brazil	5–35	Canada
Try: Tranquez 2'm Con: M. Duque (0/1)	Report	Try: Berna (2) 1'c, 4'c Cejvanovic 6'c Zaruba 8'c Jones 13'c Con: Hirayama (5/5) 2', 4', 6', 8', 13'

Villa María del Triunfo Sports Center
Referee: Paulo Duarte (Portugal)

Bronze medal match

28 July 2019
15:05

Brazil	19–24 (a.e.t.)	United States
Try: Tranquez 5'c F. Sancery 7'c L. Duque 8'm Con: M. Duque (1/1) 6'; L. Duque (1/1) 7'; Reeves (0/1)	Report	Try: Wheeler (2) 3'c, 10'c Clark 12'm Tupuola 19'; Con: Melphy (2/3) 4', 11'; Drop: Melphy (0/1)

Villa María del Triunfo Sports Center
Referee: Dale Hall (Canada)

=== Women's tournament ===
Pool stage

Pos	Team	Pld	W	D	L	PF	PA	PD	Pts	Qualification
1	Canada	3	3	0	0	134	0	+134	9	Semifinals
2	Brazil	3	2	0	1	78	31	+47	7	Semifinals
3	Peru	3	1	0	2	48	94	−46	5	5–8th place semifinals
4	Mexico	3	0	0	3	7	143	−136	3	5–8th place semifinals

Source: Lima 2019
Rules for classification: 1) Points; 2) Head-to-head result; 3) Point difference; 4) Points scored; 5) draw.

26 July 2019
10:40

Brazil	33–5	Peru
Try: Zanellato (2) 5'c, 12'c Cerullo (2) 9'c, 12'c Kochhann 14'm Con: Kochhann (2/3) 6', 9', 13'; Cerullo (1/1) 12'	Report	Try: Flores 2'm Con: Quesada (0/1)

Villa María del Triunfo Sports Center
Referee: Shanda Mosher-Gallant (Canada)

27 July 2019
11:00

Brazil	45–0	Mexico
Try: B. Silva (2) 0'm, 2'm Kochhann (2) 3'c, 4'c Costa 11'c M. Silva 13'c Cerullo 14'c Con: Kochhann (2/4) 4', 5'; Cerullo (3/3) 11', 13', 14'	Report

Villa María del Triunfo Sports Center
Referee: Emily Hsieh (United States)

27 July 2019
15:15

Canada	26–0	Brazil
Try: Levale 3'c Lukan 7'm Buisa 9'c Ogunjimi 12'c Con: Nicholas (3/3) 4', 10', 12'; Levale (0/1)	Report

Villa María del Triunfo Sports Center
Referee: Emily Hsieh (United States)

Semifinal

28 July 2019
11:15

United States	33–19	Brazil
Try: Ramsey (2) 0'c, 7'c Matyas 3'm Henrich 8'c Gustaitis 12'c Con: Olsen (3/4) 1', 8', 9'; Canett (1/1) 13'	Report	Try: Costa 7'c B. Silva (2) 11', 14'; Con: Kochhann (1/2) 7'; Cerullo (1/1) 14'

Villa María del Triunfo Sports Center
Referee: Shanda Mosher-Gallant (Canada)

Bronze medal match

28 July 2019
14:40

Colombia	29–24 (a.e.t.)	Brazil
Try: Ibarra 3'c S. Acevado 5'm Lopera (2) 11'm, 16'; N. Acevado 14'c Con: Lopera (2/4) 4', 14'	Report	Try: Cerullo 0'c da Silva 2'm B. Silva 7'c de Souza 8'm Con: Kochhann (2/4) 1', 7'

Villa María del Triunfo Sports Center
Referee: Emily Hsieh (United States)

== Sailing ==
Brazil has qualified 11 boats for a total of 17 sailors.

Men

Athlete	Event	Race													Total	
Athlete	Event	1	2	3	4	5	6	7	8	9	10	11	12	M	Points	Rank
Brenno Francioli	RS:X	5	4	2	1	6	4	4	4	1	5	4	~~7~~	6	46	4
Bruno Fontes	Laser	6	8	~~16~~	1	1	3	1	2	2	4	—N/a		6	34	2nd place, silver medalist(s)
Gabriel Borges; Marco Grael	49er	1	2	2	2	1	1	1	3	1	2	1	~~7~~	6	23	1st place, gold medalist(s)

Women

Athlete	Event	Race													Total	
Athlete	Event	1	2	3	4	5	6	7	8	9	10	11	12	M	Points	Rank
Patrícia Freitas	RS:X	~~8~~; ~~OCS~~	1	3	2	1	1	2	1	1	1	3	1	4	21	1st place, gold medalist(s)
Gabriella Kidd	Laser radial	14	5	9	6	4	~~19~~; ~~DSQ~~	8	4	7	9	—N/a		16	82	8
Martine Grael; Kahena Kunze	49erFX	1	~~2~~	1	1	2	1	1	2	1	1	1	1	6	19	1st place, gold medalist(s)

Mixed

Athlete	Event	Race													Total	
Athlete	Event	1	2	3	4	5	6	7	8	9	10	11	12	M	Points	Rank
Rafael Martins; Juliana Duque	Snipe	4	4	5	3	1	3	~~6~~	3	6	2	—N/a		4	35	3rd place, bronze medalist(s)
Cláudio Biekarck; Gunnar Ficker; Isabel Ficker	Lightning	~~7~~	4	1	2	3	2	1	2	1	2	—N/a		6	24	2nd place, silver medalist(s)
Samuel Albrecht; Gabriela Nicolino	Nacra 17	1	2	3	3	3	3	3	2	~~8~~; ~~UFD~~	1	2	2	6	31	3rd place, bronze medalist(s)

Open

Athlete	Event	Race																					Total	
Athlete	Event	1	2	3	4	5	6	7	8	9	10	11	12	13	14	15	16	17	18	M1	M2	M3	Points	Rank
Bruno Lobo	Kites	2 STP	1	~~11~~; ~~RET~~	~~3~~	~~3~~	1	1	1	1	1	2	2	1	1	1	1	1	1	1	1	1	21	1st place, gold medalist(s)
Matheus Dellagnelo	Sunfish	4	2	5	2	1	2	~~8~~	2	1	2	—N/a								4	—N/a		25	1st place, gold medalist(s)

== Shooting ==
Brazil qualified a team of 21 shooters (twelve men and nine women).

Men

Pistol and rifle

Athlete	Event	Qualification		Final	
Athlete	Event	Points	Rank	Points	Rank
Júlio Almeida	10 m air pistol	571-16x	4th Q	217.3	3rd place, bronze medalist(s)
Philipe Chateaubriand	10 m air pistol	572-14x	3rd Q	154.9	6th
Emerson Duarte	25 m rapid fire pistol	561-12x	8th	did not advance	
Vladimir da Silveira	25 m rapid fire pistol	556-11x	9th	did not advance	
Leonardo Nascimento	10 m air rifle	616.00	13th	did not advance	
Jefferson Lima	10 m air rifle	605.00	25th	did not advance	
Leonardo Nascimento	50 m rifle three position	1162-43x	3rd	393.6	8th
Cassio Rippel	50 m rifle three position	1144-52x	11th	did not advance	

Shotgun

Athlete	Event	Qualification		Semifinal		Final / BM	
Athlete	Event	Points	Rank	Points	Rank	Opposition Result	Rank
Roberto Schmits	Trap	120	3 Q	—N/a		32	3rd place, bronze medalist(s)
Fernando Silveira	Trap	115	9th	did not advance			
Renato Portela	Skeet	112	20th	did not advance			
José Vendruscolo	Skeet	108	23rd	did not advance			

Women

Pistol and rifle

Athlete	Event	Qualification		Final	
Athlete	Event	Points	Rank	Points	Rank
Thais Carvalho Moura	10 m air pistol	554-10x	15th	did not advance	
Rachel de Castro	10 m air pistol	548-6x	18th	did not advance	
Ana Luiza Ferrão	25 m pistol	568-9x	7 Q	16	4th
Geovana Meyer	10 m air rifle	615.0	13th	did not advance	
Simone Prachthauser	10 m air rifle	594.7	23rd	did not advance	
Rosane Budag Ewald	50 m rifle three position	1113-24x	24th	did not advance	
Roberta Tesch	50 m rifle three position	1126-29x	20th	did not advance	

Shotgun

Athlete	Event	Qualification		Semifinal		Final / BM	
Athlete	Event	Points	Rank	Points	Rank	Opposition Result	Rank
Janice Teixeira	Trap	94	12	did not advance			
Georgia Bastos	Skeet	112	7th	did not advance			
Danielle Gedeon	Skeet	97	10th	did not advance|			

Mixed

Athlete	Event	Qualification		Final	
Athlete	Event	Points	Rank	Points	Rank
Thais Carvalho Moura; Júlio Antônio Souza	10 m air pistol	742	15th	did not advance	
Rachel de Castro; Philipe Chateaubriand	10 m air pistol	736	18th	did not advance	
Geovana Meyer; Leonardo Nascimento	10 m air rifle	826.6	6th	did not advance	
Janice Teixeira; Roberto Schmits	Trap	126	10th	did not advance	

== Squash ==
Brazil qualified a male team of 3 athletes through the 2018 Pan American Squash Championships.

Men

Athlete	Event	Group stage			Round of 32	Round of 16	Quarterfinal	Semifinal / Cl.	Final / BM / Pl.	
Athlete	Event	Opposition Result	Opposition Result	Rank	Opposition Result	Opposition Result	Opposition Result	Opposition Result	Opposition Result	Rank
Pedro Mometto	Singles	—N/a			Delierre (CAN); L 10–12, 11–13, 11–6, 4–11	did not advance				17
Diego Gobbi Tschick	Singles	—N/a			Elías (PER); L 7–11, 10–12, 11–8, 11–9, 8–11	did not advance				17
Rafael Alarçón; Pedro Mometto	Doubles	—N/a				Herrera; Vargas (COL); L 3–11, 2–11	did not advance			9
Rafael Alarçón; Pedro Mometto; Diego Gobbi Tschick	Team	Bermuda; W 3–0, 3–0, 3–0	Colombia; L 3–0, 2–3, 0–3	2 Q	—N/a	Chile; W 3–0, 3–0, 3–0	United States; L 0–3, 0–3	Argentina; W 3–0, 0–3, 3–2	Guatemala; L 0–3, 2–3	6

== Surfing ==
Brazil qualified eight surfers (four men and four women) in the sport's debut at the Pan American Games.

Artistic

Athlete	Event	Round 1	Round 2	Round 3	Round 4	Repechage 1	Repechage 2	Repechage 3	Repechage 4	Repechage 5	Final / BM	
Athlete	Event	Opposition Result	Opposition Result	Opposition Result	Opposition Result	Opposition Result	Opposition Result	Opposition Result	Opposition Result	Opposition Result	Opposition Result	Rank
Robson Santos Coleta	Men's open	Barona (ECU); W 14.50 – 7.60	Perez (ESA); L 7.67 – 14.94	—N/a			Muñiz (ARG); L 11.10 – 11.46	did not advance				
Luiz Eduardo Diniz	Men's stand up paddleboard	Hughes (USA), Rodriguez (MEX); L 7.50	—N/a			de Armas (PUR), Colucci (VEN); W 13.00	de Cabo (ARG); W 17.34 – 7.34	Spencer (CAN); W 13.14 – 10.17	Hughes (USA); L 6.00 – 11.20	did not advance		
Wenderson Conceição	Men's longboard	Gil Lo Prete (ARG), Cortéz (CHI); L 10.76 Q	Clemente (PER), Flores (CRC); L 13.00 Q	Robbins (USA); L 11.90	—N/a			Gil Lo Prete (ARG) L 7.60 – 12.90	did not advance			
Karol Ribeiro	Women's open	Alonso (PAN); W 8.90 – 8.77	Detmers (MEX); L 4.90 – 9.73	—N/a			Anderson (CHI); L 3.70 – 9.33	did not advance				
Nicole Pacelli	Women's stand up paddleboard	Torres (PER), Bruhwiler (CAN); L 7.50 Q	Appleby (USA), Cosoleto (ARG); W 8.76 Q	Gómez (COL); W 13.00 – 10.90	Torres (PER); L 5.73 – 13.17	—N/a				Gómez (COL); L 11.56 – 14.10	Did not advance	3rd place, bronze medalist(s)
Chloé Gama	Women's longboard	Thompson (USA), Bermudez (VEN); W 13.07 Q	Soriano (ECU), Dempfle-Olin (CAN); W 14.66 Q	Gil Boggan (ARG); W 12.83- 9.70	Dempfle-Olin (CAN); W 10.60- 10.30	—N/a					Reyes (PER); W 15.36- 12.76	1st place, gold medalist(s)

Race

Athlete	Event	Time	Rank
Vinnicius Martins	Men's stand up paddleboard	25:51.3	2nd place, silver medalist(s)
Lena Ribeiro	Women's stand up paddleboard	33:25.7	1st place, gold medalist(s)

== Swimming ==
Brazil has qualified 35 athletes total, 18 men and 17 women:

Men

Event	Athletes	Heats		Final	
Event	Athletes	Time	Position	Time	Position
50 m freestyle	Bruno Fratus	22.02	2	21.61	1st place, gold medalist(s)
50 m freestyle	Pedro Spajari	22.17	4	22.27	5
100 m freestyle	Marcelo Chierighini	49.02	2	48.09	1st place, gold medalist(s)
100 m freestyle	Breno Correia	49.24	5	49.14	5
200 m freestyle	Fernando Scheffer	1:49.86	7	1:46.68	1st place, gold medalist(s)
200 m freestyle	Breno Correia	1:48.21	3	1:47.47	2nd place, silver medalist(s)
400 m freestyle	Fernando Scheffer	3:50.80	3	3:49.60	2nd place, silver medalist(s)
400 m freestyle	Luiz Altamir Melo	3:53.87	5	3:49.91	3rd place, bronze medalist(s)
800 m freestyle	Miguel Valente	—N/a		7:56.37	2nd place, silver medalist(s)
800 m freestyle	Diogo Villarinho	—N/a		8:03.17	6
1500 m freestyle	Guilherme Costa	—N/a		15:09.93	1st place, gold medalist(s)
1500 m freestyle	Diogo Villarinho	—N/a		15:26.94	6
100 m backstroke	Guilherme Guido	54.52	2	53.54	2nd place, silver medalist(s)
200 m backstroke	Leonardo de Deus	2:01.51	5	1:58.73	3rd place, bronze medalist(s)
200 m backstroke	Brandonn Almeida	2:01.51	5	2:01.51	6
100 m breaststroke	João Gomes Júnior	59.57	1	59.51	1st place, gold medalist(s)
100 m breaststroke	Felipe Lima	59.91	2	1:00.36	4
200 m breaststroke	Caio Pumputis	2:14.77	11	did not advance	
200 m breaststroke	Felipe Lima	did not start			
100 m butterfly	Vinicius Lanza	53.11	4	51.88	3rd place, bronze medalist(s)
200 m butterfly	Leonardo de Deus	2:00.00	5	1:55.86	1st place, gold medalist(s)
200 m butterfly	Luiz Altamir Melo	1:58.76	3	1:57.78	4
200 m individual medley	Leonardo Coelho Santos	2:02.74	5	2:00.29	3rd place, bronze medalist(s)
200 m individual medley	Caio Pumputis	2:02.48	2	2:00.12	2nd place, silver medalist(s)
400 m individual medley	Brandonn Almeida	4:23.24	2	4:21.10	3rd place, bronze medalist(s)
400 m individual medley	Leonardo Coelho Santos	4:24.51	5	4:19.41	2nd place, silver medalist(s)
4 × 100 m freestyle relay	Breno Correia; Marcelo Chierighini; Bruno Fratus; Pedro Spajari	—N/a		3:12.61	1st place, gold medalist(s)
4 × 200 m freestyle relay	Luiz Altamir Melo; Fernando Scheffer; João de Lucca; Breno Correia	—N/a		7:10.66	1st place, gold medalist(s)
4 × 100 m medley relay	Guilherme Guido; João Gomes Júnior; Vinicius Lanza; Marcelo Chierighini; Leonardo de Deus; Felipe Lima; Luiz Altamir Melo; Breno Correia	3:40.11	2	3:30.98	2nd place, silver medalist(s)
10 km marathon	Victor Colonese	—N/a		1:54:03.6	3rd place, bronze medalist(s)
10 km marathon	Allan do Carmo	—N/a		2:03:33.5	13

Women

Event	Athletes	Heats		Final	
Event	Athletes	Time	Position	Time	Position
50 m freestyle	Etiene Medeiros	25.53	4	24.88	1st place, gold medalist(s)
50 m freestyle	Lorrane Ferreira	25.50	2	25.52	4
100 m freestyle	Larissa Oliveira	56.02	4	55.25	3rd place, bronze medalist(s)
100 m freestyle	Daynara de Paula	56.65	6	56.88	7
200 m freestyle	Larissa Oliveira	2:01.08	6	1:59.78	3rd place, bronze medalist(s)
200 m freestyle	Manuella Lyrio	2:00.42	4	2:00.44	6
400 m freestyle	Aline Rodrigues	4:14.15	4	4:12.79	5
400 m freestyle	Viviane Jungblut	4:16.79	8	4:15.35	6
800 m freestyle	Viviane Jungblut	—N/a		8:36.04	3rd place, bronze medalist(s)
800 m freestyle	Ana Marcela Cunha	—N/a		8:48.33	7
1500 m freestyle	Viviane Jungblut	—N/a		16:30.00	5
1500 m freestyle	Ana Marcela Cunha	—N/a		16:39.83	7
100 m backstroke	Etiene Medeiros	1:02.85	7	1:00.67	3rd place, bronze medalist(s)
100 m backstroke	Fernanda de Goeij	1:01.63	4	1:01.59	5
200 m backstroke	Fernanda de Goeij	2:12.63	4	2:11.95	4
200 m backstroke	Maria Luiza Pessanha	did not start			
100 m breaststroke	Jhennifer Conceição	1:08.37	5	1:08.00	5
100 m breaststroke	Pâmela de Souza	1:10.65	10	1:10.78	10
200 m breaststroke	Pâmela de Souza	2:32.11	10	2:31.30	9
200 m breaststroke	Bruna Leme	2:35.20	13	2:31.98	10
100 m butterfly	Giovanna Diamante	1:00.32	6	59.31	4
100 m butterfly	Daynara de Paula	1:00.21	5	1:00.41	6
200 m butterfly	Maria Luiza Pessanha	did not start			
200 m butterfly	Giovanna Diamante	2:15.55	9	2:16.22	11
200 m individual medley	Gabrielle Roncatto	2:21.39	12	2:22.61	13
200 m individual medley	Camila Mello	2:18.85	8	2:17.22	7
400 m individual medley	Fernanda de Goeij	4:50.84	5	4:50.83	7
400 m individual medley	Maria Eduarda Sumida	5:00.95	10	4:58.01	10
4 × 100 m freestyle relay	Etiene Medeiros; Larissa Oliveira; Manuella Lyrio; Daynara de Paula	—N/a		3:40.39	2nd place, silver medalist(s)
4 × 200 m freestyle relay	Aline Rodrigues; Larissa Oliveira; Manuella Lyrio; Gabrielle Roncatto	—N/a		8:07.77	3rd place, bronze medalist(s)
4 × 100 m medley relay	Etiene Medeiros; Jhennifer Conceição; Giovanna Diamante; Larissa Oliveira; Fernanda de Goeij; Pâmela de Souza; Daynara de Paula; Manuella Lyrio	4:09.82	2	4:04.96	3rd place, bronze medalist(s)
10 km marathon	Ana Marcela Cunha	—N/a		2:00:51.9	1st place, gold medalist(s)
10 km marathon	Viviane Jungblut	—N/a		2:01:24.0	3rd place, bronze medalist(s)

Mixed

Event	Athletes	Heats		Final	
Event	Athletes	Time	Position	Time	Position
4 × 100 m freestyle relay	Breno Correia; Marcelo Chierighini; Larissa Oliveira; Etiene Medeiros; João de Lucca; Pedro Spajari; Lorrane Ferreira; Camila Mello	3:32.32	1	3:25.97	2nd place, silver medalist(s)
4 × 100 m medley relay	Guilherme Guido; João Gomes Júnior; Giovanna Diamante; Larissa Oliveira; Leonardo de Deus; Jhennifer Conceição; Vinicius Lanza; Manuella Lyrio	3:52.42	2	3:48.61	1st place, gold medalist(s)

== Table tennis ==
Brazil qualified a full team of six athletes (three men and three women). The team was officially announced on June 10, 2019.

Men

Athlete	Event	Group stage				First round	Second round	Quarterfinal	Semifinal	Final / BM	
Athlete	Event	Opposition Result	Opposition Result	Opposition Result	Rank	Opposition Result	Opposition Result	Opposition Result	Opposition Result	Opposition Result	Rank
Hugo Calderano	Singles	—N/a					Lamadrid (CHI); W 4 – 1	Madrid (MEX); W 4 – 0	Wang (CAN); W 4 – 2	Wu (DOM); W 4 – 3	1st place, gold medalist(s)
Gustavo Tsuboi	Singles	—N/a					Wu (DOM); L 2 – 4	did not advance			
Gustavo Tsuboi; Hugo Calderano	Doubles	—N/a						Campos / Pereira (CUB); W 4 – 3	Afanador / González (PUR); W 4 – 2	Alto / Cifuentes (ARG); W 4 – 2	1st place, gold medalist(s)
Eric Jouti; Gustavo Tsuboi; Hugo Calderano	Team	—N/a	Canada; W 3–0	Mexico; W 3–0		—N/a		Paraguay; W 3–0	United States; L 1–3	Did not advance	3rd place, bronze medalist(s)

Women

Athlete	Event	Group stage				First round	Second round	Quarterfinal	Semifinal	Final / BM	
Athlete	Event	Opposition Result	Opposition Result	Opposition Result	Rank	Opposition Result	Opposition Result	Opposition Result	Opposition Result	Opposition Result	Rank
Bruna Takahashi	Singles	—N/a				Paredes (ECU); W 4 – 1	Ortiz (DOM); W 4 – 0	Zhang (USA); W 4 – 3	Díaz (PUR); L 0 – 4	Did not advance	3rd place, bronze medalist(s)
Jessica Yamada	Singles	—N/a				Fonseca (CUB); W 4 – 2	Wu (USA); L 3 – 4	did not advance			
Bruna Takahashi; Jessica Yamada	Doubles	—N/a						Castro / Ortiz (DOM); W 4 – 1	Díaz / Díaz (PUR); L 2 – 4	Did not advance	3rd place, bronze medalist(s)
Bruna Takahashi; Caroline Kumahara; Jessica Yamada	Team	—N/a	Mexico; W 3–1	Colombia; W 3–0		—N/a		Chile; W 3–0	United States; W 3–2	Puerto Rico; L 2–3	2nd place, silver medalist(s)

Mixed

Athlete	Event	First Round	Quarterfinal	Semifinal	Final / BM	
Athlete	Event	Opposition Result	Opposition Result	Opposition Result	Opposition Result	Rank
Bruna Takahashi; Gustavo Tsuboi	Doubles	Navas / Niño (VEN); W 4 – 2	Madrid / Silva (MEX); W 4 – 1	Afanador / Díaz (PUR); W 4 – 1	Wang / Zhang (CAN); L 1 – 4	2nd place, silver medalist(s)

== Taekwondo ==
Brazil has qualified a full team of eight athletes (four men and four women) at Kyorugi events. The team was officially announced on June 4, 2019.

Kyorugi

Men

Athlete	Event	Round of 16	Quarterfinals	Semifinals	Repechage	Final/ BM	
Athlete	Event	Opposition Result	Opposition Result	Opposition Result	Opposition Result	Opposition Result	Rank
Paulo Melo	–58kg	Bye	Heiner Oviedo (CRC); W 29 – 21	Lucas Guzmán (ARG); L 6 – 7	Bye	Jefferson Ochoa (COL); W 13 – 11	3rd place, bronze medalist(s)
Edival Pontes	–68kg	Bye	Juan José Soto (CRC); W 30 – 17	Ignacio Morales (CHI); W 18 – 7	Bye	Bernardo Pie (DOM); W 17 – 14	1st place, gold medalist(s)
Ícaro Miguel Soares	–80kg	Bye	Elvis Barbosa (PUR); W 21 – 17	Moises Hernandez (DOM); W 8 – 17	Bye	Miguel Trejos (COL); L 17 – 19	2nd place, silver medalist(s)
Maicon Andrade	+80kg	Stuart Achly Smit (ARU); W 19 – 6	Jordan Stewart (CAN); W 14 – 4	Jonathan Healy (USA); L 4 – 9	Bye	Jesus Perea (ECU); W 15 – 4	3rd place, bronze medalist(s)

Women

Athlete	Event	Round of 16	Quarterfinals	Semifinals	Repechage	Final / BM	
Athlete	Event	Opposition Result	Opposition Result	Opposition Result	Opposition Result	Opposition Result	Rank
Talisca Reis	–49kg	Bye	Monique Rodriguez (USA); W 29 – 21	Andrea Ramírez (COL); W 3 – 1	Bye	Daniela Souza (MEX); L 2 – 4	2nd place, silver medalist(s)
Rafaela Araújo	–57kg	Mell Mina (ECU); L 5 – 10	did not advance				9
Milena Titoneli	–67kg	Bye	Katherine Dumar (COL); W 9 – 8	Arlettys Acosta (CUB); W 10 – 5	Bye	Paige McPherson (USA); W 9 – 8	1st place, gold medalist(s)
Raiany Fidelis Pereira	+67kg	Aniya Louissaint (HAI); W 18 – 3	Katherine Rodriguez (DOM); W 12 – 11	Gloria Mosquera (COL); L 10 – 23	Bye	Carolina Fernandez (VEN); W 7 – 0	3rd place, bronze medalist(s)

== Tennis ==
Brazil has qualified a full team of six athletes (three men and three women). After the withdrawal of Marcelo Demoliner and Beatriz Haddad Maia, the nation competed with two athletes of each gender.

Men

Athlete	Event	Round of 64	Round of 32	Round of 16	Quarterfinal	Semifinal	Final / BM	
Athlete	Event	Opposition Result	Opposition Result	Opposition Result	Opposition Result	Opposition Result	Opposition Result	Rank
João Menezes	Singles	Bye	Roncadelli (URU); W 6 – 4, 6 – 0	Cerúndolo (ARG); W 2 – 6, 6 – 3, 6 – 4	Jarry (CHI); W 7 – 5, 6 – 4	Bagnis (ARG); W 4 – 6, 6 – 2, 6 – 4	Barrios (CHI); W 7 – 5, 3 – 6, 6 – 4	1st place, gold medalist(s)
Thiago Seyboth Wild	Singles	Bye	King (USA); W 6 – 4, 6 – 2	Andreozzi (ARG); L 2 – 6, 2 – 6	did not advance			
João Menezes; Thiago Seyboth Wild	Doubles	—N/a	Bye	Gonzalez / Gonzalez (GUA); W 6 – 1, 6 – 4	Galdos / Varillas (PER); L 2 – 6, 4 – 6	did not advance		

Women

Athlete	Event	Round of 32	Round of 16	Quarterfinal	Semifinal	Final / BM	
Athlete	Event	Opposition Result	Opposition Result	Opposition Result	Opposition Result	Opposition Result	Rank
Carolina Meligeni Alves	Singles	Marino (CAN); W 5 – 7, 6 – 4, 6 – 4	Bosio (ARG); W 6 – 1, 6 – 7, 6 – 4	Zarazúa (MEX); W 6 – 2, 6 – 0	Dolehide (USA); L 6 – 7, 2 – 6	Royg (PAR); L 3 – 6, 4 – 6	4
Luisa Stefani	Singles	Olmos (MEX); W 6 – 2, 6 – 7, 6 – 2	Bui (CAN); L 3 – 6, 2 – 6	did not advance			
Carolina Meligeni Alves; Luisa Stefani	Doubles	—N/a	Bye	Pella / Podoroska (ARG); W 6 – 2, 6 – 2	Royg / González (PAR); L 5 – 7, 7 – 6, 4 – 10	Guarachi / Seguel (CHI); W 2 – 6, 7 – 5, 11 – 9	3rd place, bronze medalist(s)

Mixed

Athlete	Event	Round of 16	Quarterfinal	Semifinal	Final / BM	
Athlete	Event	Opposition Result	Opposition Result	Opposition Result	Opposition Result	Rank
João Menezes; Luisa Stefani	Doubles	—N/a	Galdos / Iamachkine (PER); L 5 – 7, 4 – 6	did not advance		

== Triathlon ==
Brazil qualified a full triathlon team of six athletes (three men and three women). The team was officially named on June 2, 2019.

Athlete	Event	Swim (1.5 km)	Trans 1	Bike (40 km)	Trans 2	Run (10 km)	Total	Rank
Manoel Messias	Men's individual	17:53	00:48	1:00:23	00:26	31:26	1:50:55	2nd place, silver medalist(s)
Diogo Sclebin	Men's individual	17:58	00:45	1:00:20	00:27	32:21	1:51:49	9
Kauê Willy	Men's individual	17:52	00:52	1:00:19	00:31	32:40	1:52:12	13
Luisa Baptista	Women's individual	19:08	00:54	1:05:28	00:27	34:58	2:00:55	1st place, gold medalist(s)
Beatriz Neres	Women's individual	20:05	00:59	1:06:48	00:26	36:33	2:04:49	9
Vittoria Lopes	Women's individual	18:32	00:56	1:05:06	00:28	35:28	2:01:27	2nd place, silver medalist(s)

Mixed relay

Athlete	Event	Swimming (300 m)	Transition 1	Biking (6.6 km)	Transition2	Running (1.5 km)	Total	Rank
Luisa Baptista	Mixed relay	3:54	0:49	10:48	0:23	4:40	20:32	—N/a
Kaue Willy	Mixed relay	3:52	0:47	9:50	0:26	4:27	19:19	—N/a
Vittoria Lopes	Mixed relay	4:12	0:50	10:48	0:28	5:07	21:24	—N/a
Manoel Messias	Mixed relay	3:53	0:48	9:41	0:26	4:34	19:21	—N/a
Total	Mixed relay	—N/a					1:20:34	1st place, gold medalist(s)

== Volleyball ==
=== Beach ===
Brazil has qualified a men's and women's pair for a total of four athletes.

Athlete	Event	Group stage				Round of 16	Quarterfinal	Semifinal	Final / BM	
Athlete	Event	Opposition Result	Opposition Result	Opposition Result	Rank	Opposition Result	Opposition Result	Opposition Result	Opposition Result	Rank
Oscar Brandão; Thiago Dealtry	Men's	Alpízar – Valenciano (CRC); W 2–0 (21–13, 21–14)	Vieyto – Cairus (URU); W 2–0 (21–16, 21–14)	González – Reyes (CUB); L 1–2 (21–16, 14–21, 16–18)	1 Q	Bye	Ontiveros – Virgen (MEX); L 0–2 (25–27, 20–22)	Vieyto – Cairus (URU); L 0–2 (13–21, 20–22)	Gomez – Hernandez (VEN); W 2–0 (21–17, 21–11)	7
Ângela Lavalle; Carolina Horta	Women's	Charles – Valenciana (ISV); W 2–0 (21–8, 21–7)	Mardones – Rivas (CHI); W 2–0 (21–16, 21–19)	Orellana – Revuelta (MEX); W 2–0 (21–10, 21–11)	1 Q	Bye	Ayala – Ríos (COL); W 2–0 (21–17, 21–13)	Cook – Pardon (USA); L 0–2 (22–24, 16–21)	Delís – Martínez (CUB); W 2–0 (21–19, 21–18)	3rd place, bronze medalist(s)

=== Indoor ===
Brazil qualified a men's team (of 12 athletes) by finishing in the top five at the 2018 Men's Pan-American Volleyball Cup.

Brazil qualified a women's team (of 12 athletes) by finishing in the top five at the 2018 Women's Pan-American Volleyball Cup.

Summary

Team	Event	Group stage				Semifinal	Final / BM / Pl.	
Team	Event	Opposition Result	Opposition Result	Opposition Result	Rank	Opposition Result	Opposition Result	Rank
Brazil men	Men's tournament	Mexico; W 3–1	Chile; W 3–1	United States; W 3–2	1 Q	Cuba; L 0–3	Chile; W 3–0	3rd place, bronze medalist(s)
Brazil women	Women's tournament	Puerto Rico; W 3–0	Argentina; L 0–3	United States; W 3–0	1 Q	Colombia; L 2–3	Argentina; L 0–3	4

==== Men's tournament ====
Group stage

Pos	Team	Pld	W	L	Pts	SW	SL	SR	SPW	SPL	SPR	Qualification
1	Brazil	3	3	0	11	9	4	2.250	303	260	1.165	Semifinals
2	Chile	3	2	1	9	7	5	1.400	263	266	0.989	Semifinals
3	United States	3	1	2	8	6	6	1.000	252	270	0.933	5th–6th place match
4	Mexico	3	0	3	2	2	9	0.222	246	268	0.918	7th–8th place match

Source: Lima 2019

31 July 2019; 20:30	Brazil	3–1	Mexico	Callao Sports Center; Referees: Brian Hemelgarn (USA), Josmer Perez (DOM)
31 July 2019; 20:30	(25–23, 25–19, 22–25, 25–22); P2 P3			Callao Sports Center; Referees: Brian Hemelgarn (USA), Josmer Perez (DOM)

1 August 2019; 20:30	Brazil	3–1	Chile	Callao Sports Center; Referees: Ricardo Borroto (CUB), Walter Vera (PER)
1 August 2019; 20:30	(25–18, 22–25, 25–16, 25–17); P2 P3			Callao Sports Center; Referees: Ricardo Borroto (CUB), Walter Vera (PER)

2 August 2019; 20:30	United States	2–3	Brazil	Callao Sports Center; Referees: Josmer Perez (DOM), Randy Sánchez (MEX)
2 August 2019; 20:30	(25–23, 25–21, 17–25, 19–25, 9–15); P2 P3			Callao Sports Center; Referees: Josmer Perez (DOM), Randy Sánchez (MEX)

Semifinal

3 August 2019; 18:30	Brazil	0–3	Cuba	Callao Sports Center; Referees: Walter Vera (PER), Brian Hemelgarn (USA)
3 August 2019; 18:30	(16–25, 22–25, 21–25); P2 P3			Callao Sports Center; Referees: Walter Vera (PER), Brian Hemelgarn (USA)

Bronze medal match

4 August 2019; 18:00	Brazil	3–0	Chile	Callao Sports Center; Referees: Josmer Perez (DOM), Nicolás Casado (ARG)
4 August 2019; 18:00	(25–12, 25–19, 25–21); P2 P3			Callao Sports Center; Referees: Josmer Perez (DOM), Nicolás Casado (ARG)

==== Women's tournament ====
Group stage

Pos	Team	Pld	W	L	Pts	SW	SL	SR	SPW	SPL	SPR	Qualification
1	Brazil	3	2	1	10	6	3	2.000	215	182	1.181	Semifinals
2	Argentina	3	2	1	9	7	5	1.400	266	256	1.039	Semifinals
3	Puerto Rico	3	1	2	6	5	7	0.714	238	268	0.888	5th–6th place match
4	United States	3	1	2	5	5	8	0.625	259	272	0.952	7th–8th place match

Source: Lima 2019

7 August 2019; 13:00	Brazil	3–0	Puerto Rico	Callao Sports Center
7 August 2019; 13:00	(25–16, 25–16, 25–15); P2 P3			Callao Sports Center

8 August 2019; 13:00	Brazil	0–3	Argentina	Callao Sports Center; Referees: Andrew Robb (CAN), James Juscamaita (PER)
8 August 2019; 13:00	(23–25, 19–25, 23–25); P2 P3			Callao Sports Center; Referees: Andrew Robb (CAN), James Juscamaita (PER)

9 August 2019; 13:00	United States	0–3	Brazil	Callao Sports Center
9 August 2019; 13:00	(21–25, 22–25, 17–25); P2 P3			Callao Sports Center

Semifinal

10 August 2019; 18:30	Brazil	2–3	Colombia	Callao Sports Center
10 August 2019; 18:30	(25–22, 27–25, 14–25, 26–28, 9–15); P2 P3			Callao Sports Center

Bronze medal match

11 August 2019; 9:00	Brazil	0–3	Argentina	Callao Sports Center; Referees: Yuri Ramírez (DOM), Misael Galindo (COL)
11 August 2019; 9:00	(24–26, 20–25, 21–25); P2 P3			Callao Sports Center; Referees: Yuri Ramírez (DOM), Misael Galindo (COL)

== Water polo ==
Brazil qualified a men's team (of 11 athletes) by winning the 2018 South American Swimming Championships.

Brazil qualified a women's team (of 11 athletes) by winning the 2018 South American Swimming Championships.

Summary

Team	Event	Group stage				Quarterfinal	Semifinal	Final / BM / Pl.	
Team	Event	Opposition Result	Opposition Result	Opposition Result	Rank	Opposition Result	Opposition Result	Opposition Result	Rank
Brazil men	Men's tournament	Peru; W 14–2	Mexico; W 10–5	Argentina; W 12–7	1 Q	Puerto Rico; W 15–4	Canada; L 7–8	Argentina; W 9–6	3rd place, bronze medalist(s)
Brazil women	Women's tournament	Venezuela; W 15–4	United States; L 4–20	Puerto Rico; W 12–8	2 Q	Mexico; W 13–3	Canada; L 5–19	Cuba; W 8–7	3rd place, bronze medalist(s)

=== Men's tournament ===
Preliminary round

Pos	Team	Pld	W	D	L	GF	GA	GD	Pts	Qualification
1	Brazil	3	3	0	0	36	14	+22	6	Quarterfinals
2	Argentina	3	2	0	1	32	29	+3	4	Quarterfinals
3	Mexico	3	1	0	2	30	31	−1	2	Quarterfinals
4	Peru (H)	3	0	0	3	16	40	−24	0	Quarterfinals

Source: Lima 2019
Rules for classification: 1) points; 2) head-to-head points; 3) head-to-head goal difference; 4) head-to-head number of goals scored; 5) goal difference.
(H) Hosts

4 August 2019; 16:30	Report	Peru	2–14	Brazil	Villa María del Triunfo Aquatic Centre, Lima; Referees: José Ortiz (PUR); Steven Rotsart (USA)
4 August 2019; 16:30	Report	Score by quarters: 0–3, 0–3, 1–5, 1–3			Villa María del Triunfo Aquatic Centre, Lima; Referees: José Ortiz (PUR); Steven Rotsart (USA)
4 August 2019; 16:30	Report	Alzamora, Villar 1	Goals	three players 3	Villa María del Triunfo Aquatic Centre, Lima; Referees: José Ortiz (PUR); Steven Rotsart (USA)

5 August 2019; 16:30	Report	Mexico	5–10	Brazil	Villa María del Triunfo Aquatic Centre, Lima; Referees: Amber Drury (USA); Doriel Terpenka (CAN)
5 August 2019; 16:30	Report	Score by quarters: 0–2, 0–1, 4–3, 1–4			Villa María del Triunfo Aquatic Centre, Lima; Referees: Amber Drury (USA); Doriel Terpenka (CAN)
5 August 2019; 16:30	Report	Álvarez, Mercado 2	Goals	Guimarães 3	Villa María del Triunfo Aquatic Centre, Lima; Referees: Amber Drury (USA); Doriel Terpenka (CAN)

6 August 2019; 19:30	Report	Brazil	12–7	Argentina	Villa María del Triunfo Aquatic Centre, Lima; Referees: Arkadii Voevodin (RUS); Juan Menéndez (CUB)
6 August 2019; 19:30	Report	Score by quarters: 6–0, 1–1, 3–2, 2–4			Villa María del Triunfo Aquatic Centre, Lima; Referees: Arkadii Voevodin (RUS); Juan Menéndez (CUB)
6 August 2019; 19:30	Report	Guimarães 4	Goals	Camnasio, Carabantes 2	Villa María del Triunfo Aquatic Centre, Lima; Referees: Arkadii Voevodin (RUS); Juan Menéndez (CUB)

Quarterfinal

8 August 2019; 19:30	Report	Puerto Rico	4–15	Brazil	Villa María del Triunfo Aquatic Centre, Lima; Referees: Fernando Varela (PER); Yasmany Lima (CUB)
8 August 2019; 19:30	Report	Score by quarters: 1–5, 1–4, 1–4, 1–2			Villa María del Triunfo Aquatic Centre, Lima; Referees: Fernando Varela (PER); Yasmany Lima (CUB)
8 August 2019; 19:30	Report	Andino 2	Goals	Guimarães 4	Villa María del Triunfo Aquatic Centre, Lima; Referees: Fernando Varela (PER); Yasmany Lima (CUB)

Semifinal

9 August 2019; 18:00	Report	Canada	8–7	Brazil	Villa María del Triunfo Aquatic Centre, Lima; Referees: Boris Margeta (SLO); Reinel Castillo (PUR)
9 August 2019; 18:00	Report	Score by quarters: 3–1, 0–0, 1–3, 4–3			Villa María del Triunfo Aquatic Centre, Lima; Referees: Boris Margeta (SLO); Reinel Castillo (PUR)
9 August 2019; 18:00	Report	Constantin-Bicari, Côté 2	Goals	Coutinho, Guimarães 2	Villa María del Triunfo Aquatic Centre, Lima; Referees: Boris Margeta (SLO); Reinel Castillo (PUR)

Bronze medal match

10 August 2019; 18:00	Report	(bronze) Brazil	9–6	Argentina	Villa María del Triunfo Aquatic Centre, Lima; Referees: Steven Rotsart (USA); Juan Menéndez (CUB)
10 August 2019; 18:00	Report	Score by quarters: 2–1, 2–0, 2–2, 3–3			Villa María del Triunfo Aquatic Centre, Lima; Referees: Steven Rotsart (USA); Juan Menéndez (CUB)
10 August 2019; 18:00	Report	P. Real, R. Real 2	Goals	Echenique 2	Villa María del Triunfo Aquatic Centre, Lima; Referees: Steven Rotsart (USA); Juan Menéndez (CUB)

=== Women's tournament ===
Preliminary round

Pos	Team	Pld	W	D	L	GF	GA	GD	Pts	Qualification
1	United States	3	3	0	0	66	10	+56	6	Quarterfinals
2	Brazil	3	2	0	1	31	32	−1	4	Quarterfinals
3	Puerto Rico	3	1	0	2	20	40	−20	2	Quarterfinals
4	Venezuela	3	0	0	3	12	47	−35	0	Quarterfinals

Source: Lima 2019
Rules for classification: 1) points; 2) head-to-head points; 3) head-to-head goal difference; 4) head-to-head number of goals scored; 5) goal difference.

4 August 2019; 8:00	Report	Brazil	15–4	Venezuela	Villa María del Triunfo Aquatic Centre, Lima; Referees: Juan Menéndez (CUB); Gerardo Arellano (MEX)
4 August 2019; 8:00	Report	Score by quarters: 2-1, 4-2, 5-0, 4-1			Villa María del Triunfo Aquatic Centre, Lima; Referees: Juan Menéndez (CUB); Gerardo Arellano (MEX)
4 August 2019; 8:00	Report	Bahia 6	Goals	Torres 3	Villa María del Triunfo Aquatic Centre, Lima; Referees: Juan Menéndez (CUB); Gerardo Arellano (MEX)

5 August 2019; 11:00	Report	Brazil	4–20	United States	Villa María del Triunfo Aquatic Centre, Lima; Referees: Nestor Torres (PER); Daniel Vázquez (MEX)
5 August 2019; 11:00	Report	Score by quarters: 1-3, 1–3, 2-7, 0-7			Villa María del Triunfo Aquatic Centre, Lima; Referees: Nestor Torres (PER); Daniel Vázquez (MEX)
5 August 2019; 11:00	Report	four players 1	Goals	Fischer 4	Villa María del Triunfo Aquatic Centre, Lima; Referees: Nestor Torres (PER); Daniel Vázquez (MEX)

6 August 2019; 8:00	Report	Brazil	12–8	Puerto Rico	Villa María del Triunfo Aquatic Centre, Lima; Referees: Fernando Varela (PER); Daniel Daners (URU)
6 August 2019; 8:00	Report	Score by quarters: 3-1, 4-3, 2-1, 3-3			Villa María del Triunfo Aquatic Centre, Lima; Referees: Fernando Varela (PER); Daniel Daners (URU)
6 August 2019; 8:00	Report	Coutinho 4	Goals	Montero 3	Villa María del Triunfo Aquatic Centre, Lima; Referees: Fernando Varela (PER); Daniel Daners (URU)

Quarterfinal

8 August 2019; 08:00	Report	Brazil	13–3	Mexico	VMT Aquatic Centre, Lima; Referees: Arkadi Voevodin (RUS); Amber Marie Drury (USA)
8 August 2019; 08:00	Report	Score by quarters: 2–1, 2–1, 4–0, 5–1			VMT Aquatic Centre, Lima; Referees: Arkadi Voevodin (RUS); Amber Marie Drury (USA)

Semifinals

9 August 2019; 11:00	Report	Brazil	5–19	Canada	VMT Aquatic Centre, Lima; Referees: Arkadi Voevodin (RUS); José Angel Ortiz Irizarry (PUR)
9 August 2019; 11:00	Report	Score by quarters: 1–4, 3–5, 1–5, 0–5			VMT Aquatic Centre, Lima; Referees: Arkadi Voevodin (RUS); José Angel Ortiz Irizarry (PUR)

Bronze medal match

10 August 2019; 11:00	Report	Brazil	8–7	Cuba	VMT Aquatic Centre, Lima; Referees: Marie-Claude Deslieres (CAN); Amber Marie Drury (USA)
10 August 2019; 11:00	Report	Score by quarters: 0–1, 5–3, 2–2, 1–1			VMT Aquatic Centre, Lima; Referees: Marie-Claude Deslieres (CAN); Amber Marie Drury (USA)
10 August 2019; 11:00	Report	three players 2	Goals	Carrasco 3	VMT Aquatic Centre, Lima; Referees: Marie-Claude Deslieres (CAN); Amber Marie Drury (USA)

== Water skiing ==
Brazil qualified two water skiers (one of each gender) and two wakeboarders (one of each gender).

Men

Athlete	Event	Preliminary		Repechage		Final				
Athlete	Event	Score	Rank	Score	Rank	Slalom	Jump	Tricks	Total	Rank
Felipe Simioni	Slalom	5.00/58/12.00	7	did not advance						
Marcelo Giardi	Wakeboard	54.33	3	61.33	2	—N/a			40.78	6

Women

Athlete	Event	Preliminary		Final				
Athlete	Event	Score	Rank	Slalom	Jump	Tricks	Total	Rank
Tamires Serrano Aguiar	Slalom	4.50/55/18.25 5.00/58/12.00	7	did not advance				
Mariana Nep Osmak	Wakeboard	52.45	2	—N/a			62.22	3rd place, bronze medalist(s)

== Weightlifting ==
Brazil qualified five weightlifters (three men and two women). The team was officially announced on May 29, 2019.

Athlete	Event	Snatch			Clean & Jerk			Total	Rank
Athlete	Event	Attempt 1	Attempt 2	Attempt 3	Attempt 1	Attempt 2	Attempt 3	Total	Rank
Serafim Veli	Men's 96 kg	163	167	170	~~192~~	195	~~203~~	365	5
Marco Túlio Machado	Men's 96 kg	~~165~~	~~165~~	166	192	~~197~~	~~198~~	358	7
Fernando Reis	Men's +109 kg	180	185	190	212	220	230	420	1st place, gold medalist(s)
Natasha Figueiredo	Women's 49 kg	75	78	80	~~90~~	96	~~98~~	176	4
Jaqueline Ferreira	Women's 87 kg	100	~~105~~	105	125	131	~~135~~	236	6

== Wrestling ==
Brazil qualified nine wrestlers (four men and five women).

Key:

- VT – Victory by fall.
- PP – Decision by points – the loser with technical points.
- PO – Decision by points – the loser without technical points.
- SP – Technical superiority – the loser with technical points and a margin of victory of at least 9 (Greco-Roman) or 10 (freestyle) points.
- ST – Great superiority – the loser without technical points and a margin of victory of at least 8 (Greco-Roman) or 10 (freestyle) points.
- VA – Decision by withdrawal

Men

Athlete	Event	Quarterfinal	Semifinal	Final / BM	
Athlete	Event	Opposition Result	Opposition Result	Opposition Result	Rank
Daniel Nascimento	Freestyle 57 kg	Fix (USA); L 0–10ST	Did not advance	Andreu (CUB); L 0–10ST	5
Antoine Jaoude	Freestyle 125 kg	Mancheno (ECU); W 5–5^{PP}	Pino (CUB); L 0-10ST	Vivenes (COL); L 0-11ST	5
Joílson Júnior	Greco-Roman 67 kg	Coleman (USA); L 3–8^{VT}	did not advance		
Ângelo Moreira	Greco-Roman 77 kg	Rivas (VEN); L 0–9ST	Did not advance	Peña (CUB); L 0–8ST	5

Women

Athlete	Event	Quarterfinal	Semifinal	Final / BM	
Athlete	Event	Opposition Result	Opposition Result	Opposition Result	Rank
Kamila Barbosa	50 kg	Diaz (MEX); W 4–1^{PP}	Conder (USA); L 0-10ST	Castillo (COL); L 2–5^{PP}	5
Camila Fama	53 kg	Montero (CUB); L 0–8^{PO}	did not advance		
Giullia Penalber	57 kg	Taylor (CAN); W 6–5^{PP}	Burkert (CAN); L 0-11ST	Ramirez (NCA); W 2–2^{VT}	3rd place, bronze medalist(s)
Lais Nunes	62 kg	Miracle (USA); L 1–8^{VT}	Did not advance	Grimán (VEN); W 4–1^{PP}	3rd place, bronze medalist(s)
Aline Silva	76 kg	Cruz (PER); W 7–0^{PO}	Capote (CUB); W 2–1^{PP}	Di Stasio (CAN); L 1–1^{PP}	2nd place, silver medalist(s)

== See also ==
- Brazil at the 2019 Parapan American Games
- Brazil at the 2020 Summer Olympics
