= Miguel Valente =

Brazilian swimmer (born 1993)

Personal information
- Born: 16 July 1993 (age 32) Belo Horizonte, Minas Gerais, Brazil
- Height: 1.77 m (5 ft 10 in)
- Weight: 71 kg (157 lb)

Sport
- Sport: Swimming
- Strokes: Freestyle
- Club: Minas TC
Medal record
Men's Swimming
Representing Brazil
Pan American Games
Silver medal – second place	2019 Lima	800 m freestyle

Miguel Leite Valente (born 16 July 1993) is a Brazilian swimmer. He competed in the men's 1500-metre freestyle event at the 2016 Summer Olympics. At the 2016 Summer Olympics, he finished 31st in the men's 1500-metre freestyle.

On 14 September 2016, at the José Finkel Trophy (short-course competition), he broke the South American record in the 800-metre freestyle, with a time of 7:42.79. He surpassed Armando Negreiros' time of 7:43.52, conquered in 2009.

At the 2019 Pan American Games held in Lima, Peru, Valente won the silver medal in the Men's 800 metre freestyle, with a time of 7:56.37. He led most of the race, being surpassed only in the end by the American Andrew Abruzzo.
