= Judo at the 2019 Pan American Games – Men's 60 kg =

Men's 60 kg at the 2019 Pan American Games
- Venue: Polideportivo 3
- Dates: August 8
- Competitors: 10 from 10 nations

Medalists
Gold medal	Renan Torres	Brazil
Silver medal	Lenin Preciado	Ecuador
Bronze medal	Roberto Almenares	Cuba
Bronze medal	Adonis Diaz	United States

The men's 60 kg competition of the judo events at the 2019 Pan American Games in Lima, Peru, was held on August 8 at the Polideportivo 3.

== Results ==
All times are local (UTC−5)

=== Bracket ===
Round of 16
John Futtinico (COL)	11S1
Hugo Vera (CHI)	00S2
Bernabé Vergara (PAN)	01S2
Julio Molina (GUA)	00

Quarter Finals
Lenin Preciado (ECU)	10S2
John Futtinico (COL)	00S1
Elmert Ramírez (DOM)	00S3
Dilmer Calle (PER)	10S2
Roberto Almenares (CUB)	01S2
Bernabé Vergara (PAN)	00S2
Renan Torres (BRA)	10S1
Adonis Diaz (USA)	01

Semi Finals
Lenin Preciado (ECU)	10
Dilmer Calle (PER)	00
Roberto Almenares (CUB)	00
Renan Torres (BRA)	11

Final
Lenin Preciado (ECU)	00S1
Renan Torres (BRA)	01S1

=== Repechage round ===
Two bronze medals were awarded.

Repechage		Bronze medal
John Futtinico (COL)	00S3
Elmert Ramírez (DOM)	10S2	Elmert Ramírez (DOM)	00S2
		Roberto Almenares (CUB)	10

Repechage		Bronze medal
Bernabé Vergara (PAN)	00S1
Adonis Diaz (USA)	01S1	Adonis Diaz (USA)	01S1
		Dilmer Calle (PER)	00S1
