= Swimming at the 2019 Pan American Games – Men's 800 metre freestyle =

Men's 800 metre freestyle at the 2019 Pan American Games
- Venue: Villa Deportiva Nacional, VIDENA
- Dates: August 8 (Final)
- Competitors: 13 from 9 nations
- Winning time: 7:54.70

Medalists
Gold medal	Andrew Abruzzo	United States
Silver medal	Miguel Valente	Brazil
Bronze medal	Ricardo Vargas	Mexico

The men's 800 metre freestyle competition of the swimming events at the 2019 Pan American Games was held on August 8, 2019 at the Villa Deportiva Nacional Videna cluster.

== Records ==
Prior to this competition, the existing World Record was as follows:

World record	Zhang Lin (CHN)	7:32.12	Rome, Italy	July 29, 2009

As there was no existing Pan American Games record in the event, the following record was established during the competition:

Date	Event	Swimmer	Nation	Time	Record
August 8	Final	Andrew Abruzzo	United States	7:54.70	GR

== Results ==
KEY:	q	Fastest non-qualifiers	Q	Qualified	GR	Games record	NR	National record	PB	Personal best	SB	Seasonal best

=== Final ===
The final round was held on August 8.

Rank	Heat	Lane	Name	Nationality	Time	Notes
1st place, gold medalist(s)	2	4	Andrew Abruzzo	United States	7:54.70	GR
2nd place, silver medalist(s)	2	3	Miguel Valente	Brazil	7:56.37	
3rd place, bronze medalist(s)	2	6	Ricardo Vargas	Mexico	7:56.78	NR
4	2	5	Nicholas Sweetser	United States	7:56.96	
5	2	2	Marcelo Acosta	El Salvador	8:00.98	
6	2	7	Diogo Villarinho	Brazil	8:03.17	
7	1	4	Rafael Zambrano	Venezuela	8:05.43	
8	2	1	Christian Bayo	Puerto Rico	8:12.17	
9	1	3	Joseph Rubio	Ecuador	8:20.67	
10	1	6	Rodolfo Falcón Mojarrieta	Cuba	8:23.30	
11	1	5	Joaquín Vargas	Peru	8:24.63	
12	2	8	Andy Arteta Gomez	Venezuela	8:29.42	
13	1	2	Piero Nascimiento	Peru	8:31.56	
