= Swimming at the 2019 Pan American Games – Men's 400 metre freestyle =

Men's 400 metre freestyle at the 2019 Pan American Games
- Venue: Villa Deportiva Nacional, VIDENA
- Dates: August 6 (preliminaries and finals)
- Competitors: 18 from 15 nations

Medalists
Gold medal	Andrew Abruzzo	United States
Silver medal	Fernando Scheffer	Brazil
Bronze medal	Luiz Altamir Melo	Brazil

The men's 400 metre freestyle competition of the swimming events at the 2019 Pan American Games were held on August 6, 2019 at the Villa Deportiva Nacional Videna cluster.

== Records ==
Prior to this competition, the existing world and Pan American Games records were as follows:

World record	Paul Biedermann (GER)	3:40.07	Rome, Italy	July 26, 2009
Pan American Games record	Ryan Cochrane (CAN)	3:48.29	Toronto, Canada	July 17, 2015

== Results ==
KEY:	q	Fastest non-qualifiers	Q	Qualified	GR	Games record	NR	National record	PB	Personal best	SB	Seasonal best

=== Heats ===
The first round was held on August 6.

Rank	Heat	Lane	Name	Nationality	Time	Notes
1	3	4	Andrew Abruzzo	United States	3:49.46	QA
2	2	4	Christopher Wieser	United States	3:50.23	QA
3	3	5	Fernando Scheffer	Brazil	3:50.80	QA
4	3	3	Marcelo Acosta	El Salvador	3:52.17	QA
5	2	5	Luiz Altamir Melo	Brazil	3:53.87	QA
6	2	6	Santiago Corredor	Colombia	3:54.03	QA
7	2	3	Ricardo Vargas	Mexico	3:54.12	QA
8	3	6	Rafael Zambrano	Venezuela	3:55.58	QA
9	3	2	Christian Bayo	Puerto Rico	3:55.85	QB
10	3	7	Alex Sobers	Barbados	3:57.66	QB
11	2	2	Franco Cassini	Argentina	3:58.94	WD
12	2	7	Joaquín Vargas	Peru	3:59.15	QB
13	2	1	Matheo Mateos	Paraguay	4:00.39	QB
14	3	1	Yugo Tsukikawa	Ecuador	4:02.31	QB
15	1	5	John Michael Bodden	Cayman Islands	4:04.34	QB
16	3	8	Christian Martinelli	Peru	4:06.62	QB
17	1	4	Graham Chatoor	Trinidad and Tobago	4:07.58	QB
18	1	3	Daniel Scott	Guyana	4:28.29	

=== Final B ===
The B final was also held on August 6.

Rank	Lane	Name	Nationality	Time	Notes
9	5	Alex Sobers	Barbados	3:58.39	
10	4	Christian Bayo	Puerto Rico	3:58.64	
11	3	Joaquín Vargas	Peru	3:59.09	
12	2	Yugo Tsukikawa	Ecuador	4:00.68	
13	8	Graham Chatoor	Trinidad and Tobago	4:02.77	
14	6	Matheo Mateos	Paraguay	4:02.81	
15	1	Christian Martinelli	Peru	4:05.20	
16	7	John Michael Bodden	Cayman Islands	4:10.70	

=== Final A ===
The A final was also held on August 6.

Rank	Lane	Name	Nationality	Time	Notes
1st place, gold medalist(s)	4	Andrew Abruzzo	United States	3:48.41	
2nd place, silver medalist(s)	3	Fernando Scheffer	Brazil	3:49.60	
3rd place, bronze medalist(s)	2	Luiz Altamir Melo	Brazil	3:49.91	
4	5	Christopher Wieser	United States	3:50.39	
5	8	Rafael Zambrano	Venezuela	3:52.27	
6	1	Ricardo Vargas	Mexico	3:52.68	
7	6	Marcelo Acosta	El Salvador	3:54.20	
8	7	Santiago Corredor	Colombia	3:56.00	
