= Renan Torres =

Brazilian judoka (born 1999)

Personal information
- Born: 25 January 1999 (age 27)

Sport
- Country: Brazil
- Sport: Judo
- Weight class: –60 kg
Medal record
Men's judo
Representing Brazil
Pan American Games
Gold medal – first place	2019 Lima	–60 kg
World Juniors Championships
Bronze medal – third place	2018 Nassau	–60 kg

Renan Torres (born 25 January 1999) is a Brazilian judoka. He won the gold medal in the men's 60 kg event at the 2019 Pan American Games held in Lima, Peru.
