= Andrew Abruzzo =

American swimmer (born 1999)

Personal information
- National team: USA
- Born: November 18, 1999 (age 26) Philadelphia, Pennsylvania, U.S.
- Occupations: Treasury Analyst, Finance
- Height: 6 ft 2 in (1.88 m)
- Weight: 180 lb (82 kg)

Sport
- Sport: Swimming
- Strokes: Freestyle, Distance
- Club: Germantown Academy Aquatic Club (GAAC)
- College team: University of Georgia (BA Finance) (MA Business Analytics)
- Coach: Jeff Thompson (GAAC); Jack Bauerle (U. Georgia)
Medal record
Pan American Games
Gold medal – first place	2019 Lima	400 m freestyle
Gold medal – first place	2019 Lima	800 m freestyle
Gold medal – first place	2019 Lima	4×100 m freestyle
World Junior Swimming Championships
Gold medal – first place	2017 Indianapolis	400 m freestyle
Gold medal – first place	2017 Indianapolis	800 m freestyle
Gold medal – first place	2017 Indianapolis	1500 m freestyle
Junior Pan Pacific Championships
Gold medal – first place	2016 Maui	400 m freestyle
Silver medal – second place	2016 Maui	800 m freestyle
Silver medal – second place	2016 Maui	1500 m freestyle
Silver medal – second place	2016 Maui	4×200 m freestyle

Andrew Joseph Abruzzo (born November 18, 1999) is an American swimmer who trained and competed for Germantown Academy, and later for the University of Georgia. He won six gold medals at the 2019 Pan American Games in Lima, Peru, and the 2017 FINA World Junior Swimming Championships in Indianapolis, Indiana, in individual distance freestyle and 4x100 freestyle relay events. He was a member of the USA Swimming National Team from 2018 to 2019.

== Early life and swimming ==
Abruzzo was born November 18, 1999, to Joseph Michael and Karen Abruzzo in Philadelphia, Pennsylvania, and attended Fort Washington's Germantown Academy.

Born into a swimming family; three of Abruzzo's siblings would swim competitively.

By his High School Senior year, his best times in Long Course (50 meter) events were:

- 100 fly: :54.64
- 200 fly: 2:00.27
- 200 back: 2:06.84
- 200 IM: 2:06.30
- 400 IM: 4:23.20
- 200 free: 1:50.93
- 400 free: 3:49.19
- 800 free: 7:54.58
- 1500 free: 15:06.48

In his High School Senior year, his best times in Short Course Yards events were:

- 100 fly: :48.59
- 200 fly: 1:46.56
- 200 back: 1:45.51
- 200 IM: 1:50.33
- 400 IM: 3:51.3
- 200 free: 1:38.01
- 500 free: 4:23.52
- 1000 free: 8:56.26
- 1650 free: 15:06.67

== International competition highlights ==
=== Junior Pan Pacs ===
At the 2016 Junior Pan Pacific Games in Maui, Hawaii, he placed first in the 400-meter freestyle and finished second in both the 1500 meter freestyle, and the 800-meter freestyle events and placed second in the 4x200-meter freestyle relay.

=== World Jr. Championships ===
He won three gold medals at the 2017 FINA World Junior Swimming Championships held in Indianapolis, Indiana. He took first in the 400-meter with a 3:49.19, another first in the 800-meter with a 7:54.58, and his third in the 1,500-meter with a 15:06.48, with all three events being his fastest times to date.

=== Pan American Games ===
He won the gold medal in both the men's 400 metre freestyle and men's 800 metre freestyle events at the 2019 Pan American Games held in Lima, Peru. He also won the gold medal in the mixed 4 × 100 metre freestyle relay event.

=== 2021 Olympic trials ===
In the June, 2021 Olympic Swim Trials in Omaha, Nebraska, he completed the 800 freestyle final, swimming a 8:01.81, and placing eighth, but did not qualify for the U.S. Olympic team. He finished eighth in the 400-meter freestyle, and finished 23rd in 200-meter butterfly preliminaries, not making the finals. In a high point in his career, he was named to the USA Swimming National Team in 2018-19 and 2019–20.

== University of Georgia ==
Abruzzo enrolled at the University of Georgia in Athens from the Fall of 2018 through 2023 where he graduated with a bachelor's degree in finance, and later studied for an MA in Business Analytics. With the Georgia Swim Team, he was managed by accomplished Head Coach Jack Bauerle, a former University of Georgia swimmer, a 2008 Head U.S. Women's Olympic Coach, and a 2020 Paris U.S. Olympic team Assistant Coach. Beginning in 2022, he was coached at Georgia by Head Coach Neal Versfeld, a former Associate Coach. In Abruzzo's Senior year in NCAA National Championship competition in the 2022–2023 season, in the 200 butterfly he finished 29th and in the 500 freestyle finished 39th. In the 2022–3 season, he was 13th in the 500 freestyle, and 19th in the 400 IM at the Southeastern Conference (SEC) Championships, and in his best SEC conference showing that year was eighth in the 200 butterfly.

=== Honors ===
In 2020, he was listed among the top twenty boy's swimmers for the Senior High School Class of 2018 as an Honorable Mention by Swimswam Magazine. His Collegiate honors at University of Georgia included:

- J. Reid Parker Director of Athletics Honor Roll
- College Sports Communicators Academic All-America Third Team
- College Sports Communicators Academic All-District Team
- SEC Academic Honor Roll
- U. of Georgia Presidential Scholar honors for fall semester 2020
- CSCAA Scholar All-America First Team

Utilizing his undergraduate finance degree, Abruzzo has worked as a Treasury Analyst for Ally Financial a bank holding company, in Charlotte, North Carolina where he began around 2023.
