= 2017 Jamaican Athletics Championships =

- Dates: 22–25 June
- Host city: Kingston, Jamaica
- Venue: Independence Park
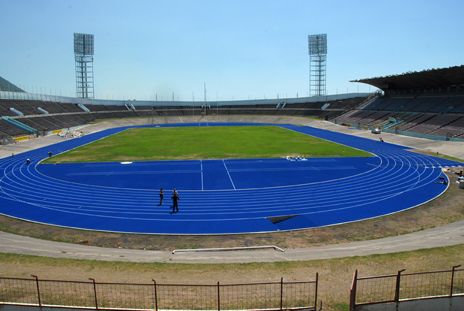

The 2017 Jamaican Athletics Championships was the year's national outdoor track and field championships for Jamaica. It was held from 22–25 June at the Independence Park in Kingston, Jamaica.

== Results ==
=== Men ===
Event	Gold		Silver		Bronze	
100 metres	Yohan Blake	9.90	Julian Forte	10.04	Senoj-Jay Givans	10.05
200 metres	Yohan Blake	19.97	Rasheed Dwyer	20.26	Warren Weir	20.39
400 metres	Nathon Allen	44.58	Demish Gaye	44.64	Steven Gayle	45.09
800 metres	Daniel Glave	1:47.47	Strymar Livingston	1:47.58	Chadoye Dawson	1:47.68
1500 metres	Thaleetio Green	3:59.75	Kevin Campbell	4:01.89	Darryll Oliver	4:27.30
5000 metres	Kemoy Campbell	13:53.61	Oshane Archibald	15:30.02	Only two finishers	
110 m hurdles	Omar McLeod	12.90 NR	Ronald Levy	13.13	Hansle Parchment	13.19
400 m hurdles	Jaheel Hyde	48.53	Kemar Mowatt	48.53	Ricardo Cunningham	48.83
High jump	Clayton Brown	2.15 m	Carlington Moulton	2.15 m	Lushane Wilson	2.10 m
Pole vault	Akeem Kerr	4.20 m	Dane Smith	4.20	Only two finishers	
Long jump	Ramone Bailey	8.16 m (+0.0 m/s)	Damar Forbes	8.03 m (+0.4 m/s)	Tajay Gayle	7.87 m (-0.1 m/s)
Triple jump	Clive Pullen	16.83 m (+1.9 m/s)	Wilbert Walker	16.02 m (+1.3 m/s)	Clayton Brown	15.97 m (+1.1 m/s)
Shot put	O'Dayne Richards	21.29 m	Fedrick Dacres	20.25 m	Ashinia Miller	20.22 m
Discus throw	Fedrick Dacres	66.52 m	Traves Smikle	63.26 m	Chad Wright	60.20 m
Hammer throw	Caniggia Raynor	70.93 m NR	Only one finisher			
Javelin throw	Adrian Mitchell	67.16 m	Zaavan Richards	64.38 m	Orlando Thomas	63.41 m

=== Women ===
Event	Gold		Silver		Bronze	
100 metres	Elaine Thompson	10.71	Simone Facey	11.04	Jura Levy	11.06
200 metres	Shashalee Forbes	22.71	Simone Facey	22.74	Jodean Williams	22.95
400 metres	Shericka Jackson	50.05	Chrisann Gordon	50.13	Novlene Williams-Mills	50.14
800 metres	Natoya Goule	2:00.90	Jazmine Fray	2:02.28	Samantha James	2:03.42
100 m hurdles	Danielle Williams	12.56	Megan Simmonds	12.63	Yanique Thompson	12.69
400 m hurdles	Ronda Whyte	54.29	Ristananna Tracey	54.49	Leah Nugent	54.54
High jump	Kimberly Williamson	1.88 m	Saniél Atkinson-Grier	1.85 m	Natrena Hooper	1.75 m
Long jump	Jessica Noble	6.46 m (-0.3 m/s)	Shanice Mcpherson	6.43 m (-0.1 m/s)	Tissanna Hickling	6.37 m (-1.0 m/s)
Triple jump	Kimberly Williams	14.60 (+5.1 m/s) w	Shanieka Ricketts	14.39 m (+2.4 m/s) w	Shardia Lawrence	13.63 m (+2.8 m/s) w
Shot put	Danniel Thomas	18.80 m	Gleneve Grange	16.28 m	Isheka Binns	15.86 m
Discus throw	Kellion Knibb	62.73 m NR	Isheka Binns	58.84 m	Samantha Hall	58.75 m
Hammer throw	Natalie Grant	56.87 m	Kadine Johnson	54.49 m	Nayoka Clunis	49.53 m
Javelin throw	Kateema Riettie	48.53	Olivia Marshal	46.10 m	Salcia Slack	44.29 m
