= 2016 Jamaican Athletics Championships =

- Dates: 30 June – 3 July
- Host city: Kingston, Jamaica
- Venue: Independence Park
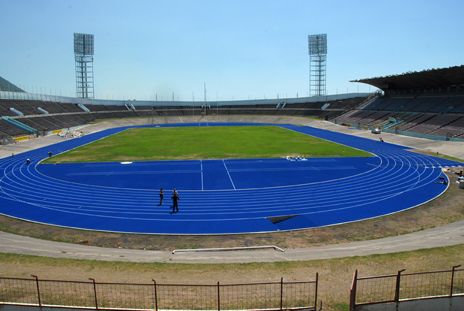

The 2016 Jamaican Athletics Championships was the year's national outdoor track and field championships for Jamaica. It was held from 30 June – 3 July at the Independence Park in Kingston, Jamaica.

== Results ==
=== Men ===
Event	Gold		Silver		Bronze	
100 metres	Yohan Blake	9.95	Nickel Ashmeade	9.96	Jevaughn Minzie	10.02
200 metres	Yohan Blake	20.29	Nickel Ashmeade	20.45	Julian Forte	20.45
400 metres	Javon Francis	44.95	Fitzroy Dunkley	45.35	Nathon Allen	45.52
800 metres	Jowayne Hibbert	1:47.59	Sadiki White	1:47.65	Strymar Livingston	1:47.93
1500 metres	Giovani Mowatt	3:55.97	Obrien Frith	4:01.97	Darryll Oliver	4:18.17
5000 metres	Kemoy Campbell	13:43.21	Dwayne Graham	15:42.84	Robin Rowe	16:31.66
110 m hurdles (wind: +0.4 m/s)	Omar McLeod	13.01	Deuce Carter	13.21	Andrew Riley	13.49
400 m hurdles	Annsert Whyte	48.66	Jaheel Hyde	48.81	Roxroy Cato	48.96
High jump	Christoff Bryan	2.25 m	Matthew Campbell	2.05 m	Kobe-Jordan Rhooms	2.00 m
Pole vault	Xavier Boland	4.60 m	Only one finisher			
Long jump	Damar Forbes	8.16 m (+1.5 m/s)	Jerome Wilson	7.61 m (+3.8 m/s) w	Shawn-D Thompson	7.56 m (+2.0 m/s)
Triple jump	Clive Pullen	16.90 m (+1.9 m/s)	Damon Mclean	16.46 m (+3.2 m/s) w	Wilbert Walker	16.42 m (+3.1 m/s) w
Shot put	O'Dayne Richards	20.82 m	Ashinia Miller	19.21 m	Warren Barrett	17.73 m
Discus throw	Fedrick Dacres	62.27 m	Chad Wright	61.83 m	Traves Smikle	61.72 m
Hammer throw	Caniggia Raynor	70.91 m NR	Kyle Davis-Hammerquist	57.15 m	Only two finishers	
Javelin throw	Orlando Thomas	69.98 m	Zaavan Richards	64.02 m	Adrian Mitchell	63.94 m

=== Women ===
Event	Gold		Silver		Bronze	
100 metres	Elaine Thompson	10.70 NR	Shelly-Ann Fraser-Pryce	10.93	Christania Williams	10.97
200 metres	Simone Facey	22.65	Veronica Campbell-Brown	22.80	Kali Davis-White	22.94
400 metres	Stephenie Ann McPherson	50.04	Christine Day	50.29	Shericka Jackson	50.42
800 metres	Natoya Goule	2:00.23	Kenia Sinclair	2:01.11	Simoya Campbell	2:02.85
100 m hurdles	Megan Simmonds	12.79	Shermaine Williams	12.90	Nickiesha Wilson	12.97
400 m hurdles	Ristananna Tracey	54.75	Leah Nugent	55.44	Kaliese Spencer	55.83
High jump	Kimberly Williamson	1.86 m	Saniél Atkinson-Grier	1.83 m	Tamoya Walters	1.70 m
Long jump	Chanice Porter	6.59 m (+0.2 m/s) PB	Jessica Noble	6.28 m (+0.6 m/s)	Tricia Moss	6.13 m (-0.3 m/s)
Triple jump	Kimberly Williams	14.66 m (+2.6 m/s) w	Shanieka Thomas	14.44 m (+3.0 m/s) w	Shardia Lawrence	13.28 m (+1.9 m/s)
Shot put	Danniel Thomas	16.84 m	Janel Fullerton	15.03 m	Latifah Smith	14.25 m
Discus throw	Tara-Sue Barnett	59.03 m	Shadae Lawrence	58.95 m	Kellion Knibb	57.56 m
Hammer throw	Daina Levy	64.18 m	Natalie Grant	57.34 m	Kadine Johnson	52.56 m
Javelin throw	Kateema Riettie	49.89 m	Olivia McKoy	47.29 m	Olivia Leckford	47.19 m
