= 2018 Jamaican Athletics Championships =

- Dates: 21–24 June
- Host city: Kingston, Jamaica
- Venue: Independence Park
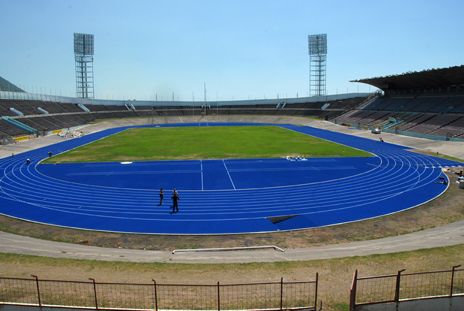

The 2018 Jamaican Athletics Championships was the year's national outdoor track and field championships for Jamaica. It was held from 21–24 June at the Independence Park in Kingston, Jamaica. The national junior championships were staged alongside the senior events.

== Results ==
=== Men ===
Event	Gold		Silver		Bronze	
100 metres	Tyquendo Tracey	10.07	Kenroy Anderson	10.24	Nesta Carter	10.31
200 metres	Jahnoy Thompson	20.21	Nigel Ellis	20.37	Tyquendo Tracey	20.51
400 metres	Christopher Taylor	44.88	Demish Gaye	45.23	Fitzroy Dunkley	45.77
800 metres	Jauavney James	1:50.07	Eric Mckenzie	1:50.77	Ackeen Colley	1:51.72
1500 metres	Kemoy Campbell	3:51.04	Thaleetio Green	3:52.29	Only two entrants	
110 m hurdles	Ronald Levy	13.16	Hansle Parchment	13.40	Andrew Riley	13.53
400 m hurdles	Annsert Whyte	48.80	Shawn Rowe	49.04	Kemar Mowatt	49.16
High jump	Brown Clayton	2.20 m	Damar Robinson	2.10 m	Only two finishers	
Long jump	Ramone Bailey	8.10 m (+0.1 m/s)	Tajay Gayle	8.08 m (+1.2 m/s)	Wayne Pinnock	7.96 m (+0.3 m/s)
Triple jump	Jordan Scott	16.55 m (+1.4 m/s)	Odaine Lewis	16.44 m (+0.2 m/s)	Brown Clayton	16.19 m (+0.9 m/s)
Shot put	Odayne Richards	20.86 m	Ashinia Miller	19.90 m	Fedrick Dacres	18.51 m
Discus throw	Fedrick Dacres	65.13 m	Basil Bingham	58.47 m	Glenford Watson	57.60 m
Hammer throw	Caniggia Raynor	64.72 m	Only one entrant			
Javelin throw	Orlando Thomas	69.27 m	Elvis Graham	66.56 m	Zaavan Richards	63.64 m

=== Women ===
Event	Gold		Silver		Bronze	
100 metres	Elaine Thompson	11.01	Shelly-Ann Fraser-Pryce	11.09	Shericka Jackson	11.13
200 metres	Shericka Jackson	22.28	Shashalee Forbes	22.95	Jodean Williams	23.23
400 metres	Stephenie Ann McPherson	50.74	Christine Day	51.41	Anastasia Le-Roy	52.00
800 metres	Natoya Goule	1:58.85	Simoya Campbell	2:00.59	Fellan Ferguson	2:03.56
100 m hurdles	Danielle Williams	12.63	Yanique Thompson	12.78	Jeanine Williams	12.94
400 m hurdles	Janieve Russell	54.18	Leah Nugent	54.70	Ronda Whyte	54.90
High jump	Saniél Atkinson-Grier	1.83 m	Only one entrant			
Long jump	Tissanna Hickling	6.50 m (+0.1 m/s)	Todea-Kay Willis	6.05 m (-0.2 m/s)	Shanice Lewis	5.85 m (+0.1 m/s)
Triple jump	Shanieka Ricketts	14.39m (+0.6 m/s)	Jehvania Whyte	13.10 m (+1.4 m/s)	Shardia Lawrence	12.98 m (+0.6 m/s)
Shot put	Lloydricia Cameron	16.73 m	Gleneve Grange	15.99 m	Nayoka Clunis	15.48 m
Discus throw	Shadae Lawrence	61.44	Tara-Sue Barnett	57.34 m	Shanice Love	56.92 m
Hammer throw	Nayoka Clunis	57.83 m	Kadine Johnson	52.16 m	Only two entrants	
Javelin throw	Kateema Riettie	51.52	Ayesha Champagnie	49.55 m	Georgetta Samuels	41.81 m
