= Elaine Thompson-Herah =

Jamaican sprinter (born 1992)

The Honourable Elaine Thompson-Herah CD OD
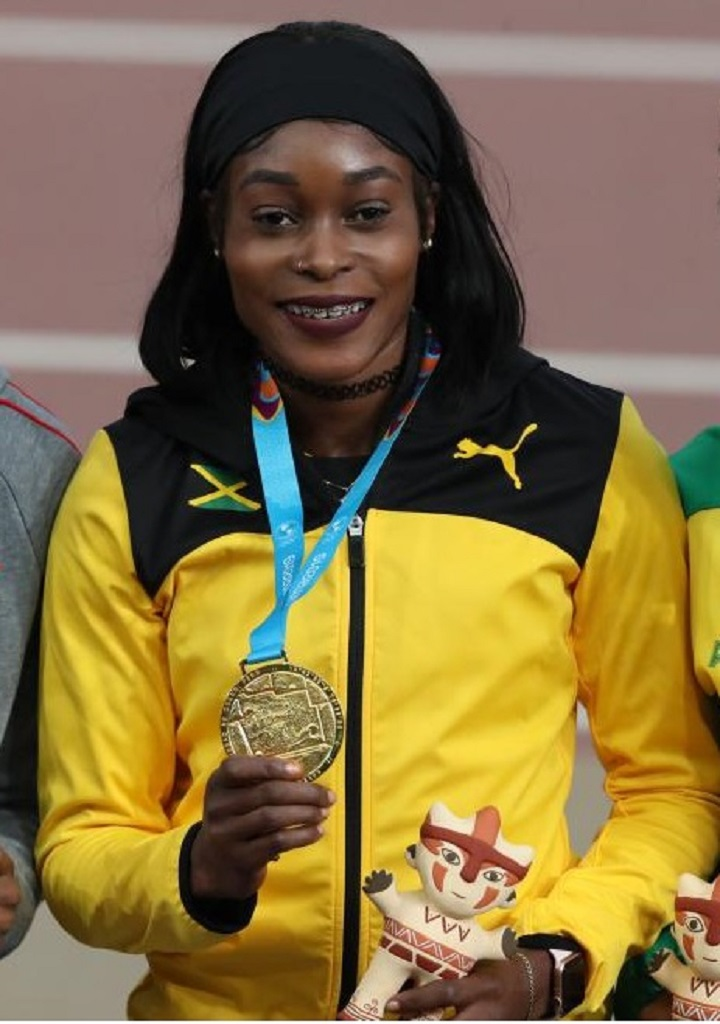
- Thompson-Herah at the 2019 Pan American Games

Personal information
- Full name: Elaine Sandra-Lee Thompson-Herah
- Born: Elaine Sandra-Lee Thompson; 28 June 1992 (age 34) Manchester, Jamaica
- Height: 1.68 m (5 ft 6 in)
- Weight: 56 kg (123 lb)
- Spouse: Derron Herah (married 2019)

Sport
- Country: Jamaica
- Sport: Track and Field
- Events: 60 m, 100 m, 200 m
- College team: UTech
- Club: Elite Performance Track Club (2023-present); New Era Track Club (2022–2023); MVP Track Club (2012–2021)
- Coached by: Reynaldo Walcott (2023-present); Shanikie Osbourne (2023); Derron Herah (2021–2023); Stephen Francis (2012–2021)

Achievements and titles
- Olympic finals: 2016 Rio de Janeiro; 100 m, Gold; 200 m, Gold; 4 × 100 m, Silver; 2020 Tokyo; 100 m, Gold; 200 m, Gold; 4 × 100 m, Gold
- World finals: 2015; 200 m, Silver; 4 × 100 m, Gold; 2017; 100 m, 5th; 2019; 100 m, 4th; 2022; 100 m, Bronze; 200 m, 7th; 4 × 100 m, Silver
- Personal bests: 60 m: 6.98i (Birmingham 2017); 100 m: 10.54 NR 2nd all time (Eugene 2021); 200 m: 21.53 (Tokyo 2021)
Medal record
Women's athletics
Representing Jamaica
Olympic Games
Gold medal – first place	2016 Rio de Janeiro	100 m
Gold medal – first place	2016 Rio de Janeiro	200 m
Gold medal – first place	2020 Tokyo	100 m
Gold medal – first place	2020 Tokyo	200 m
Gold medal – first place	2020 Tokyo	4 × 100 m relay
Silver medal – second place	2016 Rio de Janeiro	4 × 100 m relay
World Championships
Gold medal – first place	2015 Beijing	4 × 100 m relay
Silver medal – second place	2015 Beijing	200 m
Silver medal – second place	2022 Eugene	4 × 100 m relay
Silver medal – second place	2023 Budapest	4 × 100 m relay
Bronze medal – third place	2022 Eugene	100 m
World Indoor Championships
Bronze medal – third place	2016 Portland	60 m
Diamond League
First place	2016	100 m
First place	2017	100 m
First place	2021 Zurich	100 m
Third place	2019 Zurich	200 m
Third place	2023 Eugene	100 m
World Athletics Relays
Gold medal – first place	2017 Nassau	4 × 200 m relay
Gold medal – first place	2026 Gaborone	4 × 100 m relay
Bronze medal – third place	2019 Yokohama	4 × 200 m relay
Commonwealth Games
Gold medal – first place	2014 Glasgow	4 × 100 m relay
Gold medal – first place	2022 Birmingham	100 m
Gold medal – first place	2022 Birmingham	200 m
Silver medal – second place	2018 Gold Coast	4 × 100 m relay
Silver medal – second place	2022 Birmingham	4 × 100 m relay
Pan American Games
Gold medal – first place	2019 Lima	100 m
CAC Championships
Gold medal – first place	2013 Morelia	4 × 100 m relay

Elaine Sandra-Lee Thompson-Herah, née Thompson, (born 28 June 1992) is a Jamaican sprinter who competes in the 60 metres, 100 metres and 200 metres. Regarded as one of the greatest female sprinters of all time, she is a five-time Olympic champion, the fastest woman alive in the 100 m, and the fifth fastest ever in the 200 m.

Thompson-Herah is the first-ever female sprinter, and the second sprinter after Usain Bolt, to win the "sprint double" at consecutive Olympics, capturing 100 m and 200 m gold at the 2016 Rio Olympics, and defending both titles at the 2020 Tokyo Olympics. A six-time Olympic medallist, she rose to prominence at the 2015 World Athletics Championships, winning silver in the 200 m and, at the time, becoming the fifth-fastest woman in history over the distance. The next year at the Rio Olympics, she became the first woman since Florence Griffith Joyner in 1988 to win 100 m and 200 m gold at the Olympics.

After the Rio Olympics, Thompson-Herah suffered an Achilles tendon injury, which affected her performance at the 2017 and 2019 World Athletics Championships. However, she returned to the top of athletics at the Tokyo Olympics, retaining her 100 m title in a new Olympic record of 10.61 s, and her 200 m title in a new personal best and national record of 21.53 s. After winning a third gold medal in the 4 × 100 m relay, she became the third sprinter after Griffith Joyner and Bolt to complete an Olympic sprinting triple.

At the 2021 Prefontaine Classic, Thompson-Herah set another 100 m personal best, Jamaican and Diamond League record of 10.54 s, becoming the first woman to break the 40 km/h barrier. For her 2021 season, she was voted Laureus Sportswoman of the Year, and World Athletics Female Athlete of the Year. She won a bronze medal in the individual 100 m at the 2022 World Championships and a silver medal in the women's 4 × 100 m relay at both the 2022 and 2023 World Championships. After struggling with numerous injuries that caused her to miss the 2024 Summer Olympics and the entire 2025 season, she made a return to the sport in 2026.

One of the most dominant sprinters in the world, she is the 100 m 2019 Pan American Games champion and a three-time Diamond League winner. In 2022, retired American sprinter Michael Johnson called Thompson-Herah and her compatriot Shelly-Ann Fraser-Pryce the two greatest female sprinters of all time.

== Early life ==
Thompson is a native of Banana Ground in Manchester Parish, Jamaica. Running for Christiana High School and later Manchester High School, she was a good but not outstanding scholastic sprinter; her best result at the Jamaican ISSA Grace Kennedy Boys and Girls Championships came in 2009, when she placed fourth in the Class Two 100 metres in 12.01 seconds. In 2011, her final year at Manchester High, she was left off the track team for disciplinary reasons.

== Athletics career ==
After high school, Thompson was recruited to the University of Technology, Jamaica by Paul Francis, brother of MVP Track Club head coach Stephen Francis. With MVP coaching, her times started improving steadily.

In 2013, she clocked a seasonal best of 11.41 s at the Gibson Relays and placed second behind Carrie Russell at the Jamaican Intercollegiate Championships. At the Central American and Caribbean Championships in Morelia, she won gold in the 4 × 100 metres relay, running the first leg on the Jamaican team as it won in 43.58 s.

In 2014, Thompson won her first intercollegiate title, placed fifth in 11.26 s at the national championships, and had a seasonal best of 11.17 s. She represented Jamaica at the Commonwealth Games in Glasgow, running in the 4 × 100 metres relay heats; Jamaica won their heat in 42.44 s, and went on to win gold in the final with Thompson-Herah not in the line-up.

=== 2015: Breakthrough and World medals ===
Thompson made her international breakthrough in 2015. She repeated as Jamaican intercollegiate champion in March and broke 11 seconds for the first time at the UTech Classic on 11 April, running a world-leading 10.92 s. She ran 10.97 s at the Jamaica International Invitational in Kingston, defeating a field that included Blessing Okagbare and Allyson Felix. At the Prefontaine Classic in Eugene, she was narrowly beaten by English Gardner in the B-race as both were timed in 10.84 s, a new personal best for Thompson.

She was expected to run the 100 metres at the Jamaican National Championships, which doubled as trials for the 2015 World Championships in Beijing; however, her coach Stephen Francis pulled her from that event and instead had her concentrate on the 200 metres, in which she had set a personal best of 22.37 s in May. The move generated controversy in Jamaica; Francis stated that Thompson was not ready to double and that she had been prepared for the 200 m in which her main weakness, the start, would not play as large a role. She won the national 200 m title in 22.51s, qualifying for the World Championships.

At the London Grand Prix on 25 July, Thompson won a non-scoring Diamond League 200 m race in 22.10 s, defeating Americans Tori Bowie and Candyce McGrone; the time was her new personal best and broke Merlene Ottey's meeting record from 1991.

At the Beijing World Championships, she won a silver medal in the 200 m, finishing just 0.03 s behind Dafne Schippers of Netherlands. Thompson's time of 21.66 s was faster than the previous championships record. Fellow Jamaican Veronica Campbell Brown was third in 21.97 s. She went onto be part of Jamaica's 4 × 100 m relay team, winning a gold medal.

=== 2016: Double Rio Olympic champion ===
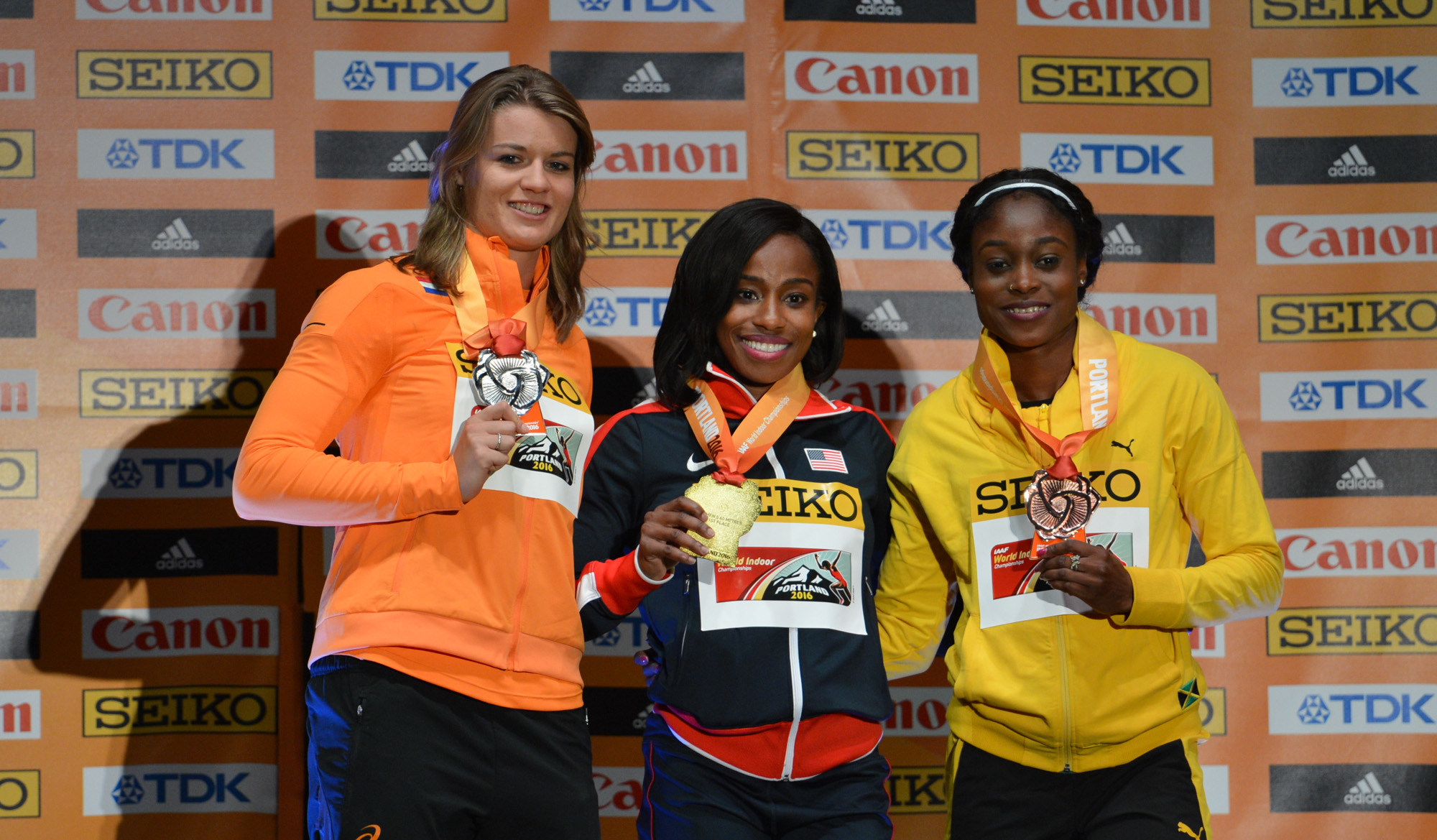
Thompson on the podium at the 2016 World Indoor Championships, alongside Dafne Schippers and Barbara Pierre

Thompson kicked off her season indoors running multiple 60 m races, including finishing second at the Glasgow Indoor Grand Prix in a new personal best of 7.14 s. At the World Indoor Championships in Portland, she would win a bronze medal in the 60 m final finishing with a time of 7.06 s, she had previously improved her personal best to 7.04 s in the semi-finals.

On 22 May, Thompson won her first scoring Diamond League event, triumphing over 100 m at the Rabat Diamond League in 11.02 s, beating a strong field that included Blessing Okagbare and Carmelita Jeter. She continued her good form by winning over the same distance at the Rome Diamond League in 10.87 s, her second-fastest clocking. At the Jamaican Championships, Thompson ran a new personal best and equal national record of 10.70 s to win over Shelly-Ann Fraser-Pryce and Christania Williams. Thompson won her heat in the 200 m in 23.34 s, but pulled out of the semi-finals due to injury. She was granted a medical exemption to compete in the 200 m at the Olympics.

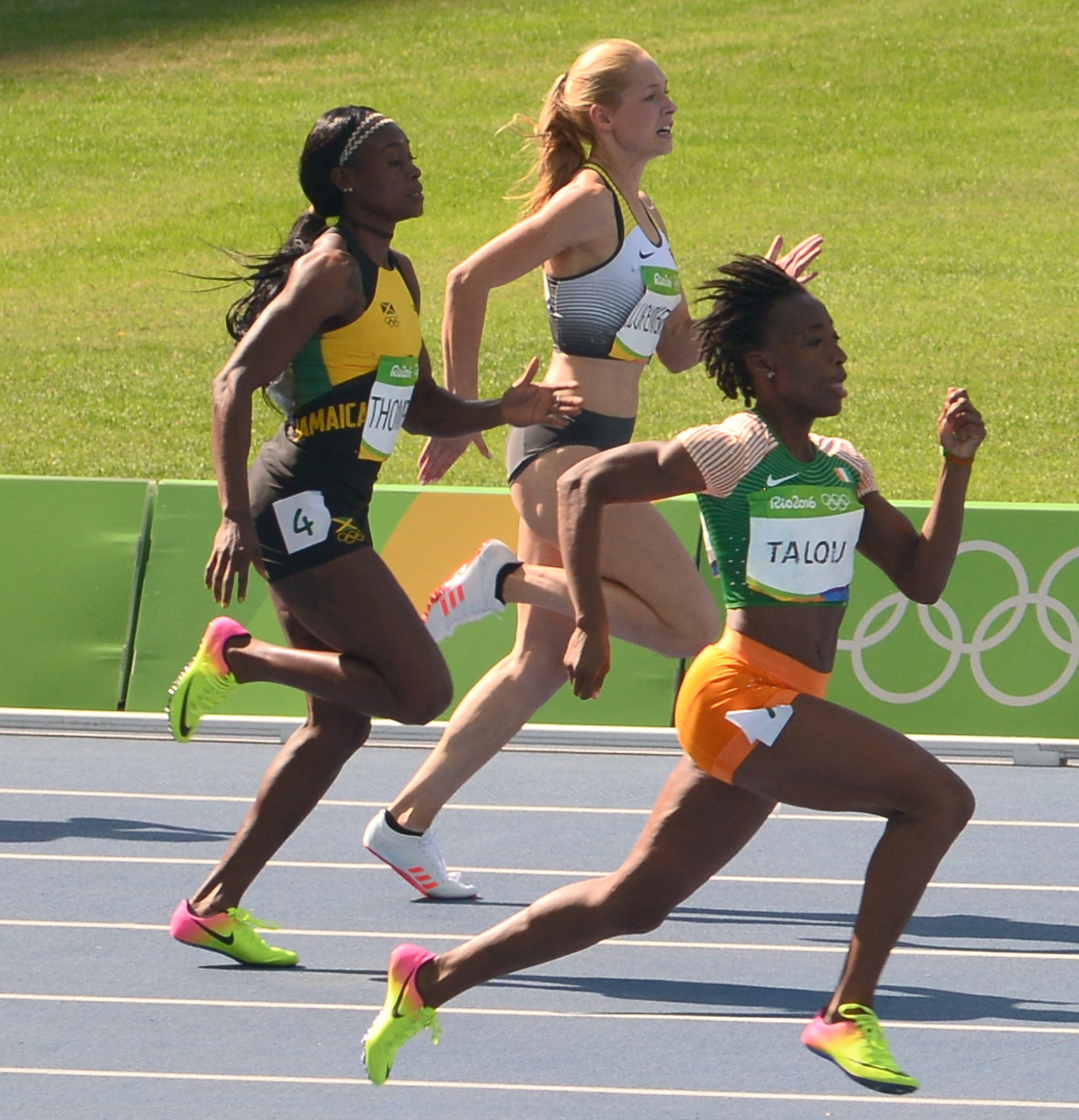
Thompson (L) competing in the 200 m heats at the 2016 Rio Olympics alongside Gina Lückenkemper and Marie-Josée Ta Lou

In the 100 m final of the 2016 Olympic Games in Rio de Janeiro, Thompson won the gold medal with a time of 10.71 s, ahead of Tori Bowie (10.83 s), and the 2008 Beijing Olympics and 2012 London Olympics winner, fellow Jamaican, Shelly-Ann Fraser-Pryce (10.86 s). In the 200 m final, she won her second gold, clocking 21.78 s; Dafne Schippers placed second in 21.88 s and Tori Bowie third in 22.15 s. She was the first female Jamaican sprinter to win both the 100 m and 200 m at a single Olympic Games. She was also the seventh sprinter to achieve this overall but the first for 28 years. She also ran in the 4 × 100 m relay final alongside Williams, Fraser-Pryce, and Veronica Campbell-Brown, winning silver in 41.36 s.

Thompson competed at the Lausanne Diamond League on 25 August, winning the 100 m in 10.78 s. At the Diamond League Finals in Zürich and Brussels, she won over both 100 m and 200 m in 10.72 s and 21.85 s, respectively.

=== 2017–2019: Continued success ===
On 18 February, Thompson competed in the 60 m at the Birmingham Indoor Grand Prix, the final meeting of the 2017 IAAF World Indoor Tour. She ran a personal best of 6.98 s, making her the equal seventh-fastest woman of all time and one of eight to break the 7 second barrier over the distance at the time.

At the World Relays in Nassau, Thompson ran in the 4 × 200 m relay, with the team running a time of 1:29.04 to win gold. She enjoyed a strong start to her outdoor season, winning her first three individual international races, running 22.19 s to win the 200 m at the Doha Diamond League, whilst also clocking a world lead of 10.78 s to win over 100 m at the Shanghai Diamond League, and winning at the Jamaica International Invitational, running 22.09 s for 200 m. In June, Thompson won the Jamaican title over 100 m, running 10.71 s - just 0.01 s outside her personal best.

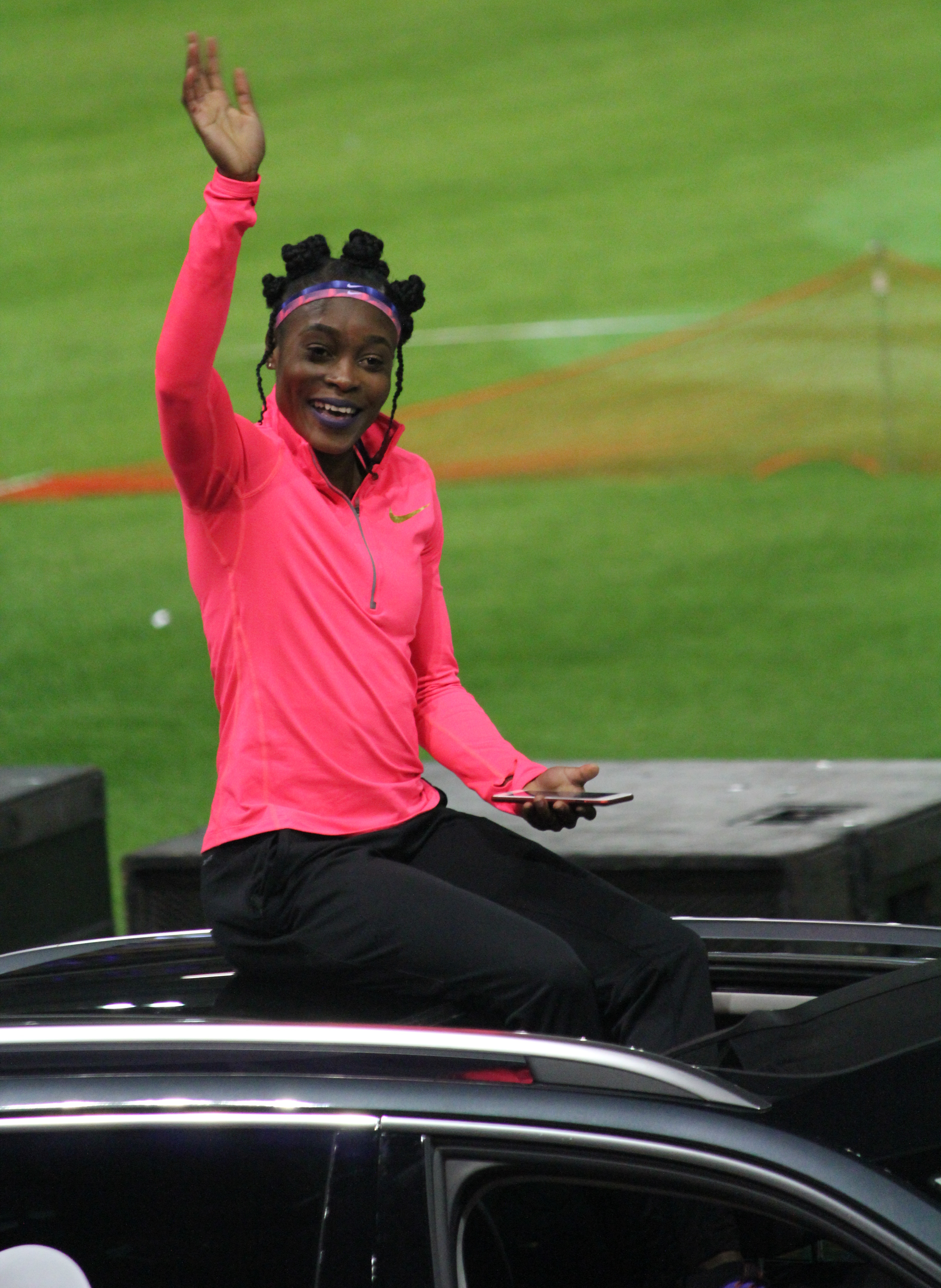
Thompson at the Brussels Memorial Van Damme in 2017

At the 2017 World Championships held in London, Thompson finished fifth in the 100 m final in a time of 10.98 s. She recovered from her disappointment at the Diamond League Finals, placing second behind Shaunae Miller-Uibo in the 200 m in 22.00 s and winning the 100 m in 10.92 s.

In 2018, Thompson competed at the World Indoor Championships in Birmingham, finishing fourth in the 60 m in 7.08 s. In April, she ran at the Commonwealth Games on the Gold Goast, finishing fourth in the 200 m and winning a silver medal in the 4 × 100 m relay. She retained her 100 m title at the Jamaican Championships in June, holding off Shelly-Ann Fraser-Pryce to win in 11.01 s.

The following year, Thompson was a part of Jamaica's team at the World Relays, where she won a bronze medal in the 4 × 200 m relay, running a time of 1:33.21 seconds. On 21 June, she took home her fourth successive 100 m title at the Jamaican Championships, winning in 10.73 s, beating out Shelly-Ann Fraser-Pryce by three-thousandths of a second. The race was the first time two women had gone sub-10.75 s in one race. She returned two days later to also win the 200 m, clocking 22.00 s. In August, she competed at the Pan American Games in Lima, winning gold in the 100 m in 11.18 s. Later that month, she secured victory over 100 m at the Paris Diamond League, running a time of 10.98 s.

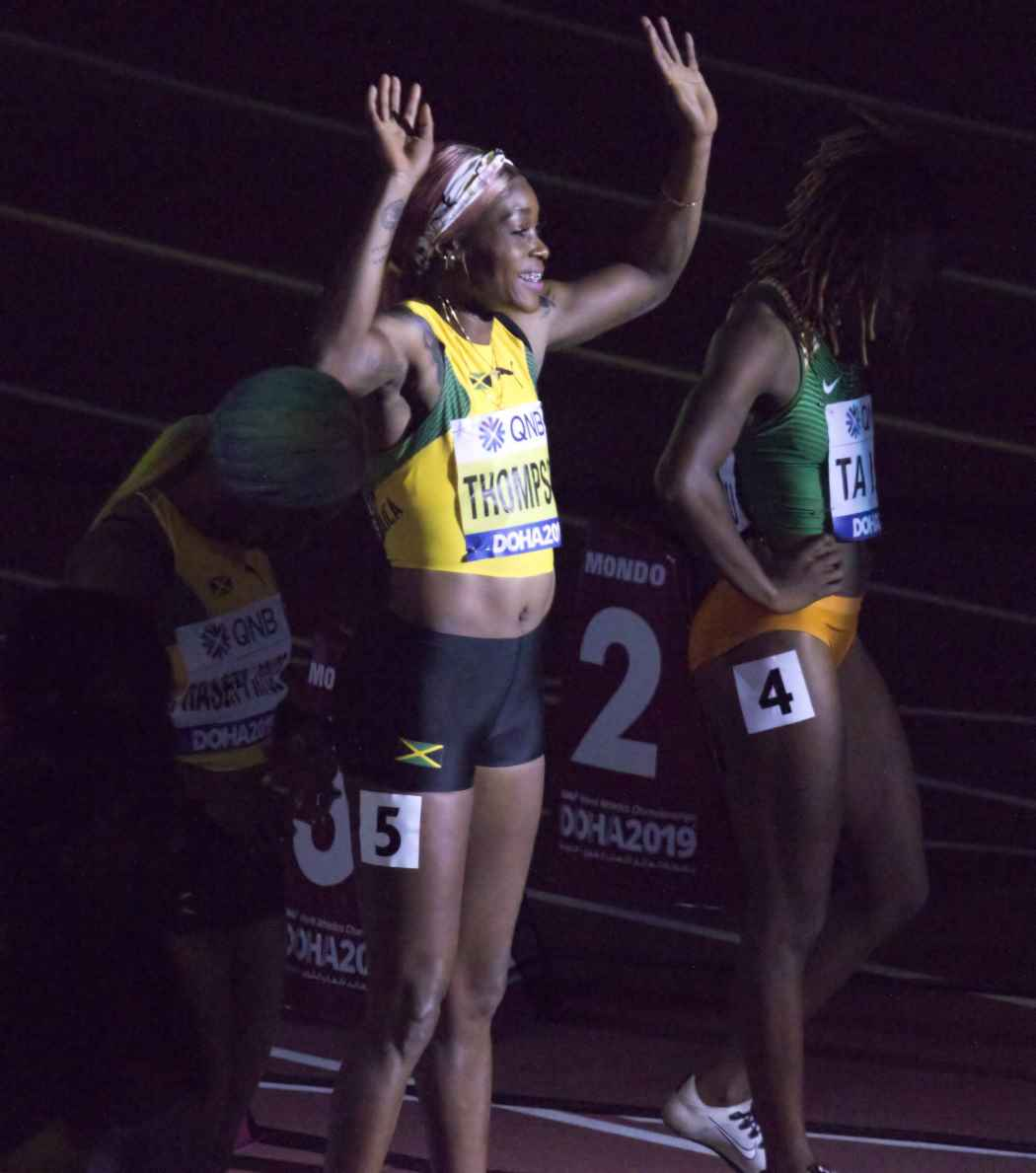
Thompson before the 100 m final at the 2019 World Championships

At the 2019 World Championships in Doha, she finished fourth in the 100 m running 10.93 s. Thompson-Herah achieved a time of 22.61 s in winning her 200 m heat, qualifying for the semi-finals, but she was unable to start due to an Achilles tendon injury.

=== 2020–2021: Triple Tokyo Olympic champion and 10.54 s clocking ===
Thompson recorded the fastest time in the COVID-19-interrupted 2020 season, running 10.85 s to win at the Rome Diamond League on 17 September. She followed it up by winning the same event at the Doha Diamond League on 25 September, in 10.87 s.

In 2021, Thompson-Herah enjoyed a strong start to her season, winning the 100 m at the Pure Athletics Sprint meet in Clermont on 2 May, in 10.78 s. At the Jamaican Championships, in June, she placed third in both the 100 m and 200 m, with times of 10.84 s and 22.02 s, respectively, qualifying for the delayed 2020 Tokyo Olympics in both events. On 6 July, at the Gyulai István Memorial, she won the 100 m in 10.71 s-a new meeting record and her fastest time since 2017.

At the Tokyo Games, Thompson-Herah won the 100 m final, winning a gold medal as Jamaica completed a medal sweep of the podium, with Shelly-Ann Fraser-Pryce and Shericka Jackson receiving silver and bronze medals, respectively. Running into an 0.6 m/s headwind, she achieved the joint second-fastest time in history of 10.61 seconds, setting both the Jamaican record and the Olympic record, breaking Florence Griffith Joyner's mark of 10.62 s set at the 1988 Seoul Olympics. Thompson-Herah ran a top speed of 39.7 km/h, the fastest speed ever achieved by a female sprinter; the previous top speed was from Griffith Joyner who reached 39.1 km/h in 1988. Competing in the 200 m, she first equalled her personal best of 21.66 s in the semi-finals. In the final, she won the gold medal with a new lifetime best of 21.53 seconds, also the then-second-fastest result in history. In addition, she was a part of 4 × 100 m relay team which won the competition in the third-fastest time ever and a new national record of 41.02 s to regain a title last won by Jamaica at the 2004 Athens Games.

In her first post-Olympic race on 21 August, competing at the Prefontaine Classic in Eugene, Thompson-Herah stormed to the 100 m victory with a new personal best of 10.54 seconds, the second-fastest time in women's history and only 0.05 s off the world record. She became the first woman to break the 40 km/h barrier. At the Athletissima meet, she placed second in the 100 m in 10.64 s, behind Fraser-Pryce who powered to her new lifetime best of 10.60 s, recording, however, the fastest runner-up time in history. She concluded her very successful season with wins at both the Meeting de Paris and Diamond League Final in Zürich with times of 10.72 s and 10.65 s, respectively, to take her third Diamond Trophy, breaking meeting records at both meets.

As of the end of the season, Thompson-Herah had many placements in the women's all-time top 10 in her specialist distances. She was the first woman to hold more than three marks in the all-time top 10 over 100 m (four) and more than two marks in the 200 m (three) simultaneously. She was also the first woman to run more than three legal times under 10.70 seconds (four), and the first woman to achieve more than two legal times under 21.70 seconds (three), respectively.

For her history-making season, Thompson-Herah received the World Athletics Female Athlete of the Year award, was named Sportswoman of the Year by Laureus, Best Female Athlete of the Year by the International Sports Press Association (529 journalists from 114 countries), Female Athlete of the Year by the North American, Central American and Caribbean Athletic Association, Athlete of the Year by Track & Field News, and Jamaican Person of the Year by the Best of Jamaica among many other accolades.

=== 2022: World Bronze medal and Double Commonwealth champion ===
In her first outdoor international competition of the year on 16 April, Thompson-Herah ran a world lead of 10.89 s to win her heat at the USATF Golden Games, before pulling out of the final. On 28 May, she competed over 100 m at the Prefontaine Classic, winning in 10.79 s. She kept up her good form with another win at the Rabat Diamond League, in 10.83 s. At the Jamaican Championships, she placed third in the 100 m clocking 10.89 s and second in the 200 m, running 22.05 s.

At the World Championships in Eugene, Thompson-Herah finished third in the 100 m with a time of 10.81 s, being part of a Jamaican medal sweep with Shelly-Ann Fraser-Pryce winning gold and Shericka Jackson taking silver. In the 200 m, she finished seventh in 22.39 s, despite running 21.97 s in the semi-finals. She recovered from her disappointment to win a silver medal in the 4 × 100 m relay.

In August, she competed at the Commonwealth Games in Birmingham. In the 100 m, she held off Julien Alfred to win in a time of 10.95 s. Thompson-Herah completed a sprint double by also winning over 200 m in a games record of 22.02 s. She won her third medal of the Games by winning bronze in the 4 × 100 m relay, later upgraded to silver due to Nigeria's doping disqualification.

=== 2023–2025: World silver medal and injury issues ===
In 2023, Thompson-Herah had an injury-disrupted start to the season, which culminated in her finishing fifth in the 100 m at the Jamaican Championships in 11.06 s, missing out on individual qualification for the 2023 World Athletics Championships in Budapest. She did compete in the heats of the 4 × 100 m relay in Budapest, winning a silver medal as Jamaica went onto place second in the final.

In the latter half of the season, Thompson-Herah's form improved as she finished third over 100 m at the Zürich Diamond League on 31 August in 11.00 s. On 4 September, she ran her first sub-11-second clocking of the season, running 10.92 s to take the win at the Galà dei Castelli meet in Bellinzona. She won again at the Brussels Diamond League on 8 September, running 10.84 s over 100 m. At the Diamond League Final on 16 September, Thompson-Herah finished third over 100 m, in a season's best of 10.79 s.

The following year, Thompson-Herah suffered an Achilles injury at the New York City Grand Prix on 9 June and had to be carried off the track. She announced she would miss the 2024 Summer Olympics as a result.

=== 2026: Return to competition ===
On 11 February, Thompson-Herah competed in her first race in 615 days, running 7.24 s to finish third behind Lavanya Williams and Shaniqua Bascombe over 60 m at the Camperdown Classics meet in Kingston. She competed in her first 100 m of the year on 19 April at the Velocity Fest 19 meet, running 10.92 s.

Thompson-Herah represented Jamaica internationally for the first time since the 2023 World Championships at the World Relays in Gaborone. She ran in the final of the women's 4 × 100 m relay and was able to anchor her team to victory despite having to adjust her stride due to a hamstring niggle. At the Jamaican Championships in June, she ran 11.18 s to finish second in her heat behind Alana Reid, but pulled out of the final. She improved her season's best to 10.91 s by finishing first at the Boris Hanzekovic Memorial in Zagreb on 26 June.

== Personal life ==
Thompson is married to former sprinter and coach Derron Herah.

== Achievements ==
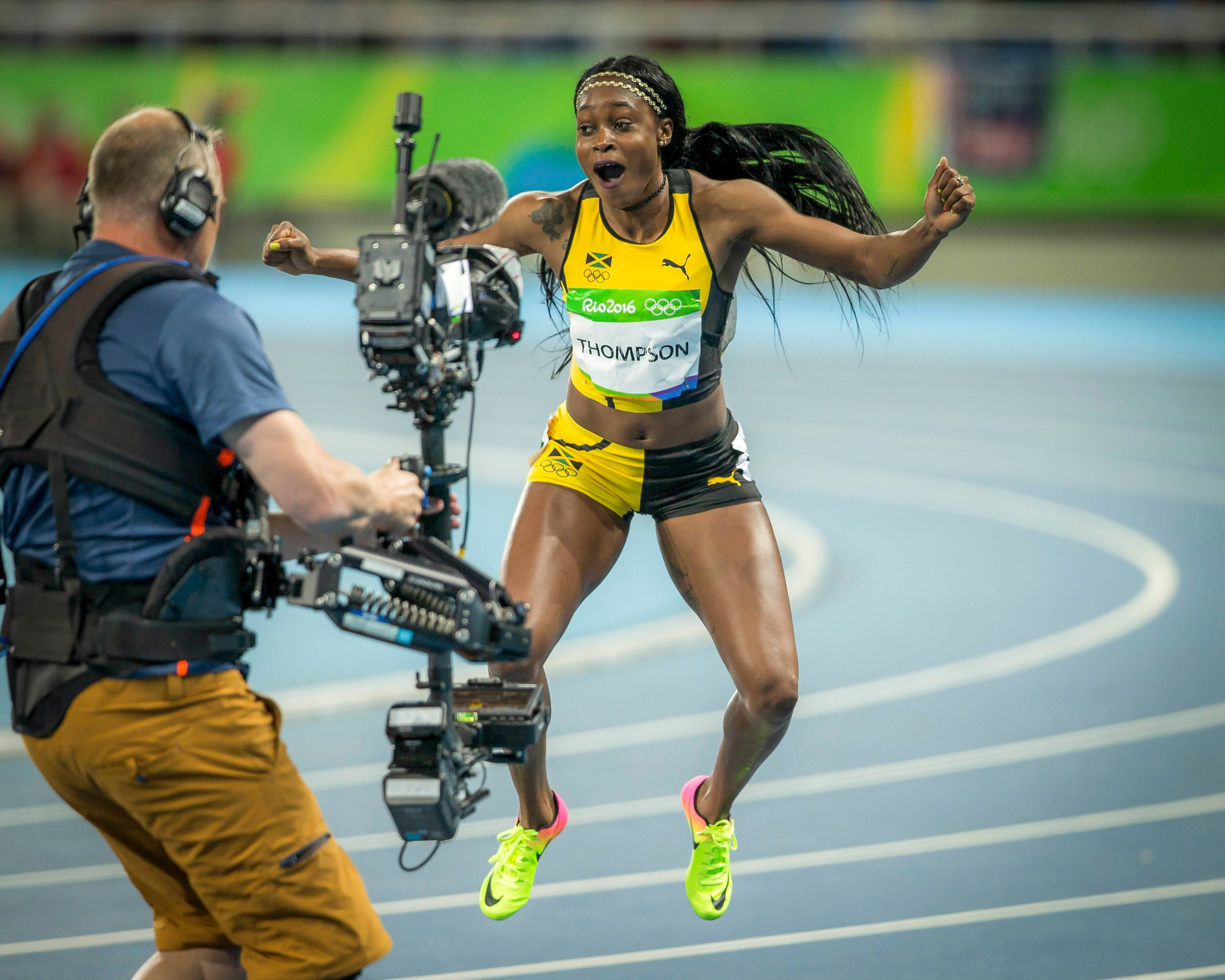
Thompson celebrates her 100 m victory at the 2016 Rio Olympics.

=== Personal bests ===
Event	Time (s)	Wind	Venue	Date	Notes
60 metres outdoor	7.02	+1.7 m/s	Kingston, Jamaica	28 January 2017	NR
60 metres indoor	6.98		Birmingham, United Kingdom	18 February 2017	11th of all time
100 metres	10.54	+0.9 m/s	Eugene, OR, United States	21 August 2021	NR, 2nd of all time
200 metres	21.53	+0.8 m/s	Tokyo, Japan	3 August 2021	5th of all time
4 × 100 metres relay	41.02		Tokyo, Japan	6 August 2021	NR, 2nd of all time
4 × 200 metres relay	1:29.04		Nassau, Bahamas	22 April 2017	NR

=== Progression ===
As of April 2022, Thompson-Herah has achieved 63 finishes under 11 seconds in the 100 metres.

View chart definition.
View chart definition.

=== International competitions ===
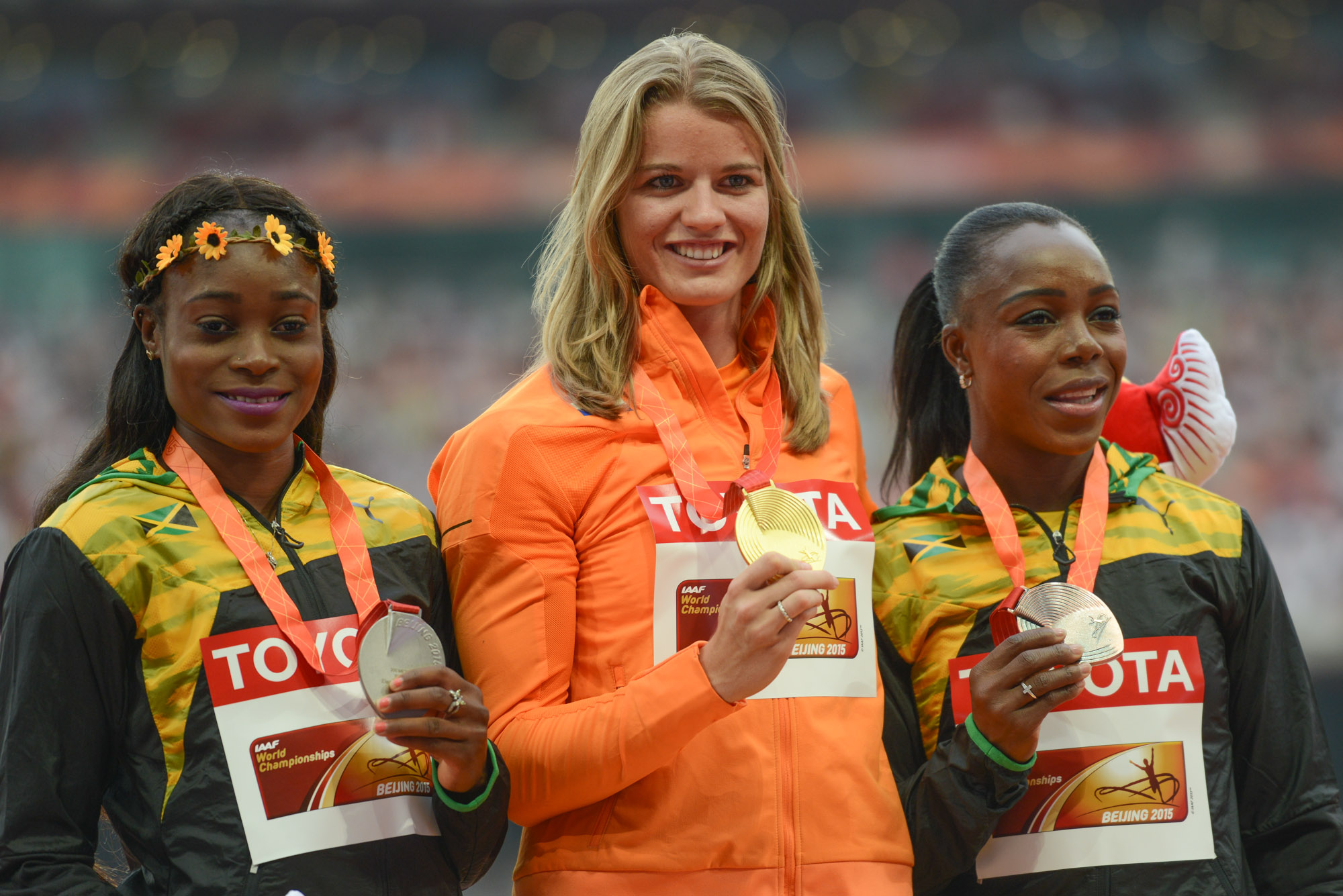
Elaine Thompson (L) with her silver for the 200 m at the 2015 World Championships in Athletics in Beijing, with Dafne Schippers and Veronica Campbell-Brown (R)

Representing Jamaica
Year	Competition	Venue	Position	Event	Time	Notes
2013	2013 CAC Championships	Morelia, Mexico	1st	4 × 100 m relay	43.58	
2014	Commonwealth Games	Glasgow, United Kingdom	1st	4 × 100 m relay	42.44	GR (Note: Time from the heats; Thompson was replaced in the final.)
2015	World Championships	Beijing, China	2nd	200 m	21.66	(+0.2 m/s)
2015	World Championships	Beijing, China	1st	4 × 100 m relay	41.07	WL CR
2016	World Indoor Championships	Portland, OR, United States	3rd	60 m	7.06	
2016	Olympic Games	Rio de Janeiro, Brazil	1st	100 m	10.71	(+0.5 m/s) (Note: Thompson became the first woman to win a gold medal in both the 100 m and 200 m at the same Olympics (Rio 2016) since Florence Griffith Joyner accomplished the feat at the 1988 Seoul Olympics.)
2016	Olympic Games	Rio de Janeiro, Brazil	1st	200 m	21.78	(+0.5 m/s) WL
2016	Olympic Games	Rio de Janeiro, Brazil	2nd	4 × 100 m relay	41.36	SB
2017	World Relays	Nassau, Bahamas	1st	4 × 200 m relay	1:29.04	CR NR
2017	World Championships	London, United Kingdom	5th	100 m	10.98	(+0.1 m/s)
2018	World Indoor Championships	Birmingham, United Kingdom	4th	60 m	7.08	
2018	Commonwealth Games	Gold Coast, Australia	4th	200 m	22.30	(+0.9 m/s) SB
2018	Commonwealth Games	Gold Coast, Australia	2nd	4 × 100 m relay	42.52	
2019	World Relays	Yokohama, Japan	3rd	4 × 200 m relay	1:33.21	
2019	Pan American Games	Lima, Peru	1st	100 m	11.18	(-0.6 m/s)
2019	World Championships	Doha, Qatar	4th	100 m	10.93	(+0.1 m/s)
2019	World Championships	Doha, Qatar	7th (heats)	200 m	22.61	(+0.7 m/s) Q (Note: Qualified for the semifinals, but did not start (Achilles injury))
2021	Olympic Games	Tokyo, Japan	1st	100 m	10.61	(-0.6 m/s) WL OR (Note: Tied for second-fastest result of all time in women's 100 m to this point, but Griffith Joyner ran a wind-aided 10.54. Thompson-Herah's mark has been labeled by the media as the 'unofficial' world record at that distance.)
2021	Olympic Games	Tokyo, Japan	1st	200 m	21.53	(+0.8 m/s) WL, PB, 3rd all time
2021	Olympic Games	Tokyo, Japan	1st	4 × 100 m relay	41.02	NR
2022	World Championships	Eugene, OR, United States	3rd	100 m	10.81	(+0.8 m/s)
2022	World Championships	Eugene, OR, United States	7th	200 m	22.39	(+0.6 m/s)
2022	World Championships	Eugene, OR, United States	2nd	4 × 100 m relay	41.18	SB
2022	Commonwealth Games	Birmingham, United Kingdom	1st	100 m	10.95	(+0.4 m/s)
2022	Commonwealth Games	Birmingham, United Kingdom	1st	200 m	22.02	(+0.6 m/s) GR
2022	Commonwealth Games	Birmingham, United Kingdom	2nd	4 × 100 m relay	43.08	
2023	World Championships	Budapest, Hungary	2nd	4 × 100 m relay	41.70	
2026	World Relays	Gaborone, Botswana	1st	4 × 100 m relay	42.00	

=== Circuit wins and titles ===
- Diamond League Overall 100 m winner: 2016 2017, 2021
  - 2015 (2): London (200 m), Zürich 4 × 100 m relay)
  - 2016 (6): Rabat (100 m), Rome (100 m), Lausanne (100 m), Zürich (200 m & 4 × 100 m relay), Brussels (100 m)
  - 2017 (8): Doha (200 m), Shanghai (100 m), Paris (100 m), London (100 m), Rabat (100 m), Birmingham (100 m), Zürich 4 × 100 m relay), Brussels (100 m)
  - 2019 (4): Rome (100 m), London (200 m & 4 × 100 m relay), Paris (100 m)
  - 2020 (2): Rome (100 m), Doha (100 m)
  - 2021 (4): London Grand Prix in Gateshead (200 m), Eugene (100 m MR DLR NR), Paris (100 m MR), Zürich (100 m MR)
  - 2022 (2): Eugene (100 m), Rabat (100 m MR)
  - 2023 (1): Brussels (100 m)
- World Indoor Tour (60 m)
  - 2017: Birmingham
  - 2019: Birmingham
  - 2022: Birmingham

=== National titles ===
- Jamaican Athletics Championships
  - 100 metres (4): 2016, 2017, 2018, 2019
  - 200 metres (2): 2015, 2019

== See also ==
- List of Olympic medalists in athletics (women)
- List of World Athletics Championships medalists (women)
- 100 metres
- 200 metres
- 2019 in 100 metres
- 2020 in 100 metres

== Notes ==
Awards
Preceded by Yulimar Rojas	World Athletics Female Athlete of the Year; 2021	Succeeded by Sydney McLaughlin-Levrone
Preceded by Naomi Osaka	Laureus World Sportswoman of the Year; 2022	Succeeded by Incumbent
