= List of Jamaican records in athletics =

The following are the national records in athletics in Jamaica maintained by its national athletics federation: Jamaica Athletics Administrative Association (JAAA).

== Outdoor ==
Key to tables: Awaiting ratification Record not kept by JAAA Not ratified or later rescinded by JAAA

=== Men ===
Event	Record	Athlete	Date	Meet	Place	Ref.	Video
50 m	5.47+ (+0.9 m/s)	Usain Bolt	16 August 2009	World Championships	Berlin, Germany		
60 m	6.31+ (+0.9 m/s)	Usain Bolt	16 August 2009	World Championships	Berlin, Germany		
100 y	9.07+ (−0.5 m/s) ^{[WB]}	Asafa Powell	27 May 2010	Golden Spike Ostrava	Ostrava, Czech Republic		
100 m	9.58 (+0.9 m/s)	Usain Bolt	16 August 2009	World Championships	Berlin, Germany		
150 m (bend)	14.44+ (−0.3 m/s)	Usain Bolt	20 August 2009	World Championships	Berlin, Germany		
150 m (straight)	14.35 (+1.1 m/s)	Usain Bolt	17 May 2009	Manchester City Games	Manchester, United Kingdom		
200 m	19.19 (−0.3 m/s)	Usain Bolt	20 August 2009	World Championships	Berlin, Germany		
300 m	30.97	Usain Bolt	27 May 2010	Golden Spike Ostrava	Ostrava, Czech Republic		
400 m	43.93	Rusheen McDonald	23 August 2015	World Championships	Beijing, China		
800 m	1:42.76	Navasky Anderson	20 September 2025	World Championships	Tokyo, Japan		
1000 m	2:17.0 h	Byron Dyce	15 August 1973		Copenhagen, Denmark		
1500 m	3:39.19	Steve Green	28 August 1994	Commonwealth Games	Victoria, Canada		
Mile	3:57.34 (Note: 3:57.3 by federation source)	Byron Dyce	1 July 1974		Stockholm, Sweden		
3000 m	7:41.87	Kemoy Campbell	10 June 2017	Racers Grand Prix	Kingston, Jamaica		
5000 m	13:20.39	Kemoy Campbell	2 May 2015	Payton Jordan Cardinal Invitational	Palo Alto, United States		
10,000 m	28:06.40	Kemoy Campbell	31 March 2017	Stanford Invitational	Stanford, United States		
10 km (road)	29:47	Mark Elliot	2 November 1991		Montgomery, United States		
Half marathon	1:09:10	Wainard Talbert	3 December 2005		Negril, Jamaica		
Marathon	2:16:39	Derick Adamson	25 November 1984	Philadelphia Marathon	Philadelphia, United States		
110 m hurdles	12.90 (+0.7 m/s)	Omar McLeod	24 June 2017	Jamaican Championships	Kingston, Jamaica		
200 m hurdles (straight)	23.02 (+1.4 m/s)	Leford Green	17 May 2014	Manchester City Games	Manchester, United Kingdom		
300 m hurdles	35.22	Kemel Thompson	30 June 2002	Norwich Union Classic	Sheffield, United Kingdom		
400 m hurdles	47.34	Roshawn Clarke	21 August 2023	World Championships	Budapest, Hungary		
3000 m steeplechase	8:52.82	Lionel Scott	4 May 1985		Indianapolis, United States		
High jump	2.34 m	Germaine Mason	9 August 2003	Pan American Games	Santo Domingo, Dominican Republic		
Pole vault	5.35 m	K'Don Samuels	7 July 2012	NACAC Under-23 Championships	Irapuato, Mexico		
Long jump	8.69 m (+0.5 m/s)	Tajay Gayle	28 September 2019	World Championships	Doha, Qatar		
Triple jump	17.92 m (+1.9 m/s)	James Beckford	20 May 1995		Odessa, United States		
Shot put	23.08 m	Rajindra Campbell	5 September 2026	Memorial Van Damme	Brussels, Belgium		
Discus throw	72.01 m	Ralford Mullings	16 August 2025	Oklahoma Throw Series	Ramona, United States		
Hammer throw	70.93 m	Caniggia Raynor	24 June 2017	Jamaican Championships	Kingston, Jamaica		
Javelin throw	77.31 m	Elvis Graham	10 June 2023	JAAA All Comers Meet 4	Kingston, Jamaica		
Decathlon	8644 pts	Maurice Smith	31 August–1 September 2007	World Championships	Osaka, Japan		
Decathlon	100m (wind) / Long jump (wind) / Shot put / High jump / 400m / 110m H (wind) / Discus / Pole vault / Javelin / 1500m; 10.62 (+0.7 m/s) / 7.50 m (±0.0 m/s) / 17.32 m / 1.97 m / 47.48 / 13.91 (−0.2 m/s) / 52.36 m / 4.80 m / 53.61 m / 4:33.52						
20 km walk (road)	1:40:11	Byron Williams	15 April 1972		Brighton, United Kingdom		
4 × 100 m relay	36.84	Nesta Carter; Michael Frater; Yohan Blake; Usain Bolt	11 August 2012	Olympic Games	London, Great Britain		
4 × 200 m relay	1:18.63	Nickel Ashmeade; Warren Weir; Jermaine Brown; Yohan Blake	24 May 2014	IAAF World Relays	Nassau, Bahamas		
Swedish relay	1:46.59	Puma Reggae Team; Christopher Williams (100m); Usain Bolt (200m); Davian Clarke (300m); Jermaine Gonzales (400 m)	25 July 2006	DN Galan	Stockholm, Sweden		
4 × 400 m relay	2:56.75	Jamaica; Michael McDonald; Greg Haughton; Danny McFarlane; Davian Clarke	10 August 1997	World Championships	Athens, Greece		
Sprint medley relay (2,2,4,8)	3:19.97	Jamaica; Mario Forsythe (200 m); Jamari Rose (200 m); Allodin Fothergill (400 m); Jo-Wayne Hibbert (800 m)	29 April 2017	Penn Relays	Philadelphia, United States		
Sprint medley relay (2,2,4,8)	3:19.25	Jamaica; Chad Walker (200 m); Rasheed Dwyer (200 m); Rusheen McDonald (400 m); Daniel Glave (800 m)	27 April 2019	Penn Relays	Philadelphia, United States		

=== Women ===
Event	Record	Athlete	Date	Meet	Place	Ref.	Video
60 m	7.02 (+1.7 m/s)	Elaine Thompson-Herah	28 January 2017	Queens Grace Invitational	Kingston, Jamaica		
100 y	9.91+ (+1.1 m/s) ^{[WB]}	Veronica Campbell-Brown	31 May 2011	Golden Spike Ostrava	Ostrava, Czech Republic		
100 m	10.54 (+0.9 m/s)	Elaine Thompson-Herah	21 August 2021	Prefontaine Classic	Eugene, United States		
150 m (bend)	16.09+ (+0.2 m/s)	Shericka Jackson	8 September 2023	Memorial van Damme	Brussels, Belgium		
150 m (straight)	16.75 (−0.7 m/s)	Shashalee Forbes	20 May 2018	Adidas Boost Boston Games	Boston, United States		
200 m	21.41 (+0.1 m/s)	Shericka Jackson	25 August 2023	World Championships	Budapest, Hungary		
200 m (straight)	22.16 (+0.9 m/s)	Anastasia Le-Roy	20 May 2018	Adidas Boost Boston Games	Boston, United States		
300 m	35.73+	Novlene Williams-Mills	29 August 2007	World Championships	Osaka, Japan		
400 m	48.57	Nickisha Pryce	20 July 2024	London Athletics Meet	London, United Kingdom		
600 m	1:24.09	Natoya Goule	30 April 2022	Penn Relays	Philadelphia, United States		
800 m	1:55.96	Natoya Goule	17 September 2023	Prefontaine Classic	Eugene, United States		
1000 m	2:34.37	Natoya Goule-Toppin	25 August 2024	Kamila Skolimowska Memorial	Chorzów, Poland		
1500 m	3:58.77	Adelle Tracey	20 August 2023	World Championships	Budapest, Hungary		
Mile	4:24.64	Yvonne Mai-Graham	17 August 1994	Weltklasse Zürich	Zürich, Switzerland		
Mile (road)	4:29.30 Wo	Adelle Tracey	19 September 2026	World Road Running Championships	Copenhagen, Denmark		
3000 m	8:37.07	Yvonne Mai-Graham	16 August 1995	Weltklasse Zürich	Zürich, Switzerland		
5000 m	15:07.50	Aisha Praught-Leer	16 May 2019		Los Angeles, United States		
10,000 m							
10 km (road)	33:56	Korene Hinds	15 January 2011	Bermuda International 10 K	Hamilton, Bermuda		
Half marathon	1:28:20	Tamica Thomas	2 December 2006		San Diego, United States		
Marathon	2:35:28	Mishka-Mae Hyde	23 November 2025	Philadelphia Marathon	Philadelphia, United States		
100 m hurdles	12.24 (−0.4 m/s)	Ackera Nugent	30 August 2024	Golden Gala	Rome, Italy		
200 m hurdles (straight)	24.86 (+0.1 m/s)	Shiann Salmon	23 May 2021	Adidas Boost Boston Games	Boston, United States		
300 m hurdles	38.69	Shiann Salmon	18 July 2026	KBC Night of Athletics	Heusden-Zolder, Belgium		
400 m hurdles	52.42	Melaine Walker	20 August 2009	World Championships	Berlin, Germany		
3000 m steeplechase	9:14.09	Aisha Praught	31 August 2018	Memorial Van Damme	Brussels, Belgium		
High jump	1.97 m	Lamara Distin	30 April 2022	Alumni Muster	College Station, United States		
Pole vault	3.40 m	Maria Newton	10 May 1998		Ashford, United Kingdom		
Pole vault	3.40 m	Maria Newton	6 June 1999		Wigan, United Kingdom		
Long jump	7.16 m A (−0.1 m/s)	Elva Goulbourne	22 May 2004		Mexico City, Mexico		
Triple jump	15.16 m (+0.7 m/s)	Trecia Smith	2 August 2004		Linz, Austria		
Shot put	19.77 m	Danniel Thomas-Dodd	27 May 2023	USATF Los Angeles Grand Prix	Westwood, United States		
Discus throw	67.05 m	Shadae Lawrence	22 May 2021	USATF Throws Festival	Tucson, United States		
Hammer throw	71.48 m	Daina Levy	25 June 2016	Lawrence Last Chance Series #3	Lawrence, United States		
Javelin throw	61.10 m	Olivia McKoy	10 July 2005	Central American and Caribbean Championships	Nassau, Bahamas		
Heptathlon	6527 pts	Diane Guthrie-Gresham	2–3 June 1995		Knoxville, United States		
Heptathlon	100m H (wind) / High jump / Shot put / 200m (wind) / Long jump (wind) / Javelin / 800m; 13.86w / 1.86 m / 13.80 m / 24.91 (−1.3 m/s) / 6.92 m w / 49.04 m / 2:20.82						
20 km walk							
4 × 100 m relay	41.02	Jamaica; Briana Williams; Elaine Thompson-Herah; Shelly-Ann Fraser-Pryce; Shericka Jackson	6 August 2021	Olympic Games	Tokyo, Japan		
4 × 200 m relay	1:29.04	Jamaica; Jura Levy; Shericka Jackson; Sashalee Forbes; Elaine Thompson	22 April 2017	IAAF World Relays	Nassau, Bahamas		
Sprint medley relay (1,1,2,4)	1:36.67	Audra Segree (100 m); Natasha Morrison (100 m); Anastasia Le-Roy (200 m); Verone Chambers (400 m)	29 April 2017	Penn Relays	Philadelphia, Pennsylvania		
Swedish relay	2:03.42	Christania Williams (100 m); Shericka Jackson (200 m); Olivia James (300 m); Chrisann Gordon (400 m)	10 July 2011		Lille, France		
4 × 400 m relay	3:18.71	Jamaica; Rosemarie Whyte; Davita Prendergast; Novlene Williams-Mills; Shericka Williams	3 September 2011	World Championships	Daegu, South Korea		
Sprint medley relay (2,2,4,8)	3:34.56	Sherri-Ann Brooks (200 m); Rosemarie Whyte(200 m); Moya Thompson 51.7 (400 m); Kenia Sinclair 1:57.43 (800 m)	April 2009	Penn Relays	Philadelphia, United States		
4 × 800 m relay	8:16.04	Jamaica; Kimarra McDonald; Simoya Campbell; Natoya Goule; Samantha James	3 May 2014	IAAF World Relays	Nassau, Bahamas		

=== Mixed ===
Event	Record	Athlete	Date	Meet	Place	Ref.
4 × 100 m relay	39.62	Jamaica; Ackeem Blake; Tina Clayton; Kadrian Goldson; Tia Clayton	3 May 2026	World Relays	Gaborone, Botswana	
4 × 400 m relay	3:11.06	Jamaica; Reheem Hayles; Junelle Bromfield; Zandrion Barnes; Stephenie Ann McPherson	2 August 2024	Olympic Games	Saint-Denis, France	

== Indoor ==
=== Men ===
Event	Record	Athlete	Date	Meet	Place	Ref.	Video
50 m	5.61+	Michael Green	16 February 1997	Meeting Pas de Calais	Liévin, France		
55 m	6.06 A	Syan Williams	14 February 1998		Colorado Springs, United States		
60 m	6.44 (heat)	Asafa Powell	18 March 2016	World Championships	Portland, United States		
60 m	6.44 (semifinal)	Asafa Powell	18 March 2016	World Championships	Portland, United States		
150 m	15.66 OT	Lerone Clarke	11 February 2010	Botnia Games	Korsholm, Finland		
200 m	20.42	Demar Francis	23 February 2024	Big 12 Championships	Lubbock, United States		
300 m	32.56	Christopher Taylor	12 February 2022	American Track League	Louisville, United States		
400 m	44.86	Akeem Bloomfield	10 March 2018	NCAA Division I Championships	College Station, United States		
800 m	1:44.75	Navasky Anderson	22 February 2026	Copernicus Cup	Toruń, Poland		
1000 m	2:18.53	Navasky Anderson	31 January 2026	Penn State National Open	State College, United States		
1500 m	3:40.7 h	Byron Dyce	8 February 1974	Millrose Games	New York City, United States		
3000 m	7:40.79 (Note: outdoor mark ratified as absolute record)	Kemoy Campbell	20 February 2016	Millrose Games	New York City, United States		
5000 m	13:14.45 (Note: outdoor mark ratified as absolute record)	Kemoy Campbell	26 February 2017	Boston University Last Chance Meet	Boston, United States		
50 m hurdles	6.58	Richard Phillips	28 January 2011	U.S. Open Track and Field	New York City, United States		
60 m hurdles	7.41	Omar McLeod	20 March 2016	World Championships	Portland, United States		
300 m hurdles	36.02 OT	Dinsdale Morgan	4 February 1998	Pirkkahall	Tampere, Finland		
400 m hurdles	50.05	Isa Phillips	6 February 2017	Meeting Elite en salle de l'Eure	Val-de-Reuil, France		
High jump	2.30 m	Germaine Mason	8 February 2003	Hochsprung mit Musik	Arnstadt, Germany		
Pole vault	5.25 m A	K'Don Samuels	28 January 2011	Pole Vault Summit	Reno, United States		
Long jump	8.40 m	James Beckford	9 February 1996		Madrid, Spain		
Long jump	8.40 m A	Carey McLeod	10 March 2023	NCAA Division I Championships	Albuquerque, United States		
Long jump	8.40 m	Wayne Pinnock	8 March 2024	NCAA Division I Championships	Boston, United States		
Triple jump	17.54 m A	Jaydon Hibbert	11 March 2023	NCAA Division I Championships	Albuquerque, United States		
Shot put	22.16 m	Rajindra Campbell	23 February 2024	Villa de Madrid Indoor Meeting	Madrid, Spain		
Weight throw	22.75 m	Daniel Cope	26 January 2024	Bob Pollock Invitational	Clemson, United States		
Discus throw	63.40 m	Fedrick Dacres	13 February 2016	ISTAF Indoor	Berlin, Germany		
Heptathlon	6035 pts	Maurice Smith	25–26 February 2005	SEC Championships	Fayetteville, United States		
Heptathlon	60m / Long jump / Shot put / High jump / 60m H / Pole vault / 1000m; 6.94 / 7.11 m / 16.03 m / 1.98 m / 7.88 / 4.50 m / 2:39.32						
5000 m walk							
4 × 200 m relay	1:25.63	Jamaica; Colin King; Kevon Rattray; Jermaine Browne; Andre Clarke	27 January 2018	Dr. Norb Sander Invitational	New York City, United States		
4 × 400 m relay	3:03.69	Jamaica; Errol Nolan; Allodin Fothergill; Akheem Gauntlett; Edino Steele	9 March 2014	World Championships	Sopot, Poland		

=== Women ===
Event	Record	Athlete	Date	Meet	Place	Ref.
50 m	6.00	Merlene Ottey	4 February 1994		Moscow, Russia	
55 m	6.68 A	Peta-Gaye Dowdie	6 February 1998		Colorado Springs, United States	
60 m	6.96	Merlene Ottey	14 February 1992		Madrid, Spain	
200 m	21.87	Merlene Ottey	13 February 1993	Meeting Pas de Calais	Liévin, France	
300 m	35.69	Patricia Hall	14 February 2012	Meeting Pas de Calais	Liévin, France	
400 m	50.47	Dejanea Oakley	14 March 2026	NCAA Division I Championships	Fayetteville, United States	
500 m	1:08.34	Leah Anderson	4 February 2023	New Balance Indoor Grand Prix	Boston, United States	
600 m	1:25.35	Natoya Goule	17 February 2017	Clemson Last Chance Invitational	Clemson, United States	
800 m	1:58.46	Natoya Goule	17 February 2022	Meeting Hauts-de-France Pas-de-Calais	Liévin, France	
1000 m	2:37.55	Natoya Goule	26 January 2019	Dr. Sander Columbia Challenge	New York City, United States	
1500 m	4:04.95	Aisha Praught-Leer	10 February 2018	New Balance Indoor Grand Prix	Roxbury, United States	
Mile	4:30.17	Adelle Tracey	8 February 2023	Copernicus Cup	Toruń, Poland	
3000 m	8:41.10	Aisha Praught-Leer	3 February 2018	Millrose Games	New York City, United States	
50 m hurdles	6.67+	Michelle Freeman	13 February 2000	Meeting Pas de Calais	Liévin, France	
55 m hurdles	7.26+	Ackera Nugent	8 February 2025	Millrose Games	New York City, United States	
60 m hurdles	7.72 A	Ackera Nugent	10 March 2023	NCAA Division I Championships	Albuquerque, United States	
High jump	2.00 m	Lamara Distin	24 February 2024	SEC Championships	Fayetteville, United States	
Pole vault	3.36 m	Sandé Swaby	23 February 2001		Lincoln, United States	
Long jump	6.91 m	Elva Goulbourne	23 February 2002	SEC Championships	Fayetteville, United States	
Triple jump	14.84 m	Trecia Smith	11 March 2006	World Championships	Moscow, Russia	
Shot put	19.22 m	Danniel Thomas-Dodd	2 March 2018	World Championships	Birmingham, United Kingdom	
Weight throw	22.95 m	Kim Barrett	12 March 2004	NCAA Division I Championships	Fayetteville, United States	
Pentathlon	4181 pts	Salcia Slack	14 March 2015	NCAA Division II Championships	Birmingham, United States	
Pentathlon	60m H / High jump / Shot put / Long jump / 800m; 8.57 / 1.60 m / 13.39 m / 5.90 m / 2:16.52					
3000 m walk						
4 × 200 m relay	1:34.83	Jamaica; Verone Chambers; Yanique Ellington; Sonequa Walker; Shavine Hodges	27 January 2018	Dr. Norb Sander Invitational	New York City, United States	
4 × 400 m relay	3:26.54	Jamaica; Patricia Hall; Anneisha McLaughlin; Kaliese Spencer; Stephenie Ann McPherson	9 March 2014	World Championships	Sopot, Poland	
4 × 800 m relay	8:17.75	Fellan Ferguson; Simoya Campbell; Kimarra McDonald; Natoya Goule	3 February 2018	Millrose Games	New York City, United States	

== U20 (Junior) records ==
=== Men outdoor ===
Event	Record	Athlete	Date	Meet	Place	Age	Ref.
100 m	9.93 (+0.6 m/s)	Gary Card	19 June 2026	Jamaican Championships	Kingston, Jamaica	19 years, 16 days	
200 m	19.93	Usain Bolt	11 Apr 2004		Hamilton, Bermuda	17 years, 234 days	
400 m	44.88	Christopher Taylor	24 June 2018	JAAA/SVL National Trials	Kingston, Jamaica	18 years, 266 days	
800 m	1:46.6 h	Neville Myton	15 Aug 1964		Kingston, Jamaica	18 years, 79 days	
1500 m	3:42.57	Kemoy Campbell	7 Jun 2008		New York City, United States	17 years, 145 days	
Mile run	4:10.59	Ackeen Colley	28 Apr 2017	123rd Penn Relays	Philadelphia, United States	19 years, 26 days	
3000 m	8:20.14	Kemoy Campbell	23 Apr 2010		Philadelphia, United States	19 years, 99 days	
2000 m steeplechase	5:49.46	Aryamanya Rodgers	22 Mar 2018	ISSA/Grace Kennedy Boys and Girls Champs	Kingston, Jamaica	17 years, 111 days	
110 m hurdles	13.32	Dejour Russell	24 Jun 2017	National Championships	Kingston, Jamaica	17 years, 84 days	
400 m hurdles	47.34	Roshawn Clarke	21 Aug 2023	18th World Athletics Championships	Budapest, Hungary	19 years, 51 days	
High jump	2.27 m	Germaine Mason	20 Jun 2002		Kingston, Jamaica	19 years, 151 days	
Long jump	8.13 m	James Beckford	20 May 1994		Odessa, United States	19 years, 131 days	
Triple jump	17.87 m	Jaydon Hibbert	13 May 2023	SEC Championships	Baton Rouge, United States	18 years, 116 days	
Shot put	18.66 m	Kobe Lawrence	11 Feb 2023	King Of The Ring	Kingston, Jamaica	19 years, 9 days	
Discus throw	59.83 m	Traves Smikle	25 Jun 2011		Kingston, Jamaica	19 years, 49 days	
Javelin throw	64.08 m	Devon Spencer	29 Mar 2014	ISSA/Grace Kennedy Boys and Girls Champs, National Stadium	Kingston, Jamaica	19 years, 139 days	
Decathlon	6996 pts	Maurice Smith	9 Jul 1999		Tampa, United States	18 years, 284 days	
4 × 100 m relay	38.61 A	Jamaica	22 Aug 2021	18th World Athletics U20 Championships	Nairobi, Kenya		
4 × 400 m relay	3:00.99 A	Jamaica	21 Jul 2019	20th Panamerican U20 Championships, Estadio Nacional	San José, Costa Rica		

=== Women outdoor ===
Event	Record	Athlete	Date	Meet	Place	Age	Ref.
100 m	10.92	Alana Reid	29 Mar 2023	ISSA/Grace Kennedy Boys And Girls Championships	Kingston, Jamaica	18 years, 68 days	
200 m	22.50	Briana Williams	14 Jul 2018	17th IAAF World U20 Championships	Tampere, Finland	16 years, 115 days	
400 m	50.92	Sandie Richards	16 May 1987		Odessa, United States	18 years, 191 days	
800 m	2:02.67	Kayann Thompson	16 Jul 2004	10th IAAF World Junior Championships	Grosseto, Italy	19 years, 168 days	
1500 m	4:22.30	Evette Turner	18 Sep 1992	4th IAAF World Junior Championships	Seoul, South Korea	15 years, 204 days	
2000 m steeplechase	6:59.79	Aneisha Ingram	26 Feb 2019	Central Championships	Spanish Town, Jamaica	18 years, 236 days	
100 m hurdles	12.71	Britany Anderson	24 Jul 2019	Motonet GP	Joensuu, Finland	18 years, 202 days	
400 m hurdles	54.58	Ristananna Tracey	24 Jun 2011		Kingston, Jamaica	19 years, 46 days	
High jump	1.88 m	Kimberly Williamson	25 Feb 2011		Spanish Town, Jamaica	17 years, 146 days	
Pole vault	4.00 m	Lloydricia Cameron	5 Apr 2013	Florida Relays	Gainesville, United States	16 years, 362 days	
Long jump	6.58 m	Chanice Porter	13 Jul 2012	14th IAAF World Junior Championships	Barcelona, Spain	18 years, 49 days	
Triple jump	13.99 m A	Lacena Golding-Clarke	16 Apr 1994		College Station, United States	19 years, 27 days	
Shot put	15.72 m	Lloydricia Cameron	28 May 2015	NCAA East Preliminary Round, Hodges Stadium, University of North Florida	Jacksonville, United States	19 years, 50 days	
Discus throw	57.84 m	Cedricka Williams	29 Mar 2023	ISSA/Grace Kennedy Boys And Girls Championships	Kingston, Jamaica	18 years, 300 days	
Hammer throw	56.90 m	Daina Levy	18 Jun 2011		Greensboro, United States	18 years, 22 days	
Javelin throw	49.72 m	Isheka Binns	6 Apr 2015	44th Carifta Games, Silver Jubilee Stadium	Basseterre, Saint Kitts and Nevis	19 years, 87 days	
Heptathlon	5411 pts	Salsa Slack	15 Mar 2008		Kingston, Jamaica	18 years, 96 days	
4 × 100 m relay	42.58	Jamaica	17 Apr 2022	CARIFTA Games	Kingston, Jamaica		
4 × 400 m relay	3:29.66	Jamaica	28 Apr 2001		Philadelphia, United States		

=== Men indoor ===
Event	Record	Athlete	Date	Meet	Place	Age	Ref.
60 m	6.66	Dexter Lee	12 Feb 2010		Fayetteville, United States	19 years, 25 days	
200 m	21.04	Tahj Hamm	4 Mar 2023	NJCAA Championships	Topeka, United States	18 years, 360 days	
400 m	46.15	Jermaine Gonzales	16 Mar 2003		New York City, United States	18 years, 110 days	
600 m	1:18.48	Reheem Hayles	7 Mar 2020	NYSPHSAA/NYS Federation Championships	Staten Island, United States	18 years, 364 days	
800 m	1:52.19	Ackeen Colley	9 Dec 2017	Yale Season Opener	New Haven, United States	19 years, 251 days	
60 m hurdles	7.75	Damion Thomas	27 Jan 2017	David Oliver Classic	Winston-Salem, United States	17 years, 212 days	
High jump	2.28 m	Christoffe Bryan	14 Feb 2015	Tyson Invitational	Fayetteville, United States	18 years, 294 days	
Long jump	7.77 m	Tarik Batchelor	23 Jan 2009		Fayetteville, United States	18 years, 307 days	
Triple jump	17.54 m A	Jaydon Hibbert	11 Mar 2023	NCAA Championships	Albuquerque, United States	18 years, 53 days	
Shot put	16.90 m	Kyle Mitchell	20 Feb 2016	Margaret Bradley Invitational	Chicago, United States	17 years, 219 days	

=== Women indoor ===
Event	Record	Athlete	Date	Meet	Place	Age	Ref.
60 m	7.18	Briana Williams	8 Feb 2020	113th NYRR Millrose Games	New York City, United States	17 years, 324 days	
200 m	23.38	Samantha Henry-Robinson	9 Mar 2007		Fayetteville, United States	18 years, 165 days	
400 m	52.85	Nadonnia Rodriques	16 Mar 2008		New York City, United States	17 years, 170 days	
600 m	1:29.69	Stacey Ann Livingston	23 Feb 2002		New York City, United States	19 years, 0 days	
800 m	2:06.16	Stacey Ann Livingston	8 Feb 2002		New York City, United States	18 years, 350 days	
1000 m	2:43.15	Jazmine Fray	10 Dec 2016	Reveille Invitational	College Station, United States	19 years, 187 days	
60 m hurdles	7.91	Ackera Nugent	26 Feb 2021	Big 12 Championships	Lubbock, United States	18 years, 303 days	
High jump	1.85 m A	Ahshareah Enoe	10 Dec 2022	Mountaineer Open and Multi	Gunnison, United States	19 years, 183 days	
Long jump	6.41 m	Chanice Porter	25 Jan 2013	Razorback Invitational	Fayetteville, United States	18 years, 245 days	
Triple jump	13.39 m	Shelly-Ann Gallimore	11 Mar 2000		Fayetteville, United States	19 years, 1 day	
Shot put	16.02 m	Zara Northover	8 Mar 2003		Boston, United States	19 years, 2 days	
Weight throw	18.59 m	Daina Levy	8 Jan 2011	Ed Temple Invite	Nashville, United States	17 years, 226 days	
Pentathlon	3852 pts (55 Hurdles)	Keke Clarke	24 Feb 2006	SEC Championships	Gainesville, United States	18 years, 361 days	
