= Shashalee Forbes =

Jamaican sprinter (born 1996)

Personal information
- Nationality: Jamaican
- Born: 10 May 1996 (age 30)
- Height: 1.60 m (5 ft 3 in)
- Weight: 55 kg (121 lb)

Sport
- Country: Jamaica
- Sport: Track and field
- Event: Sprint
- College team: GC Foster College
- Club: SprinTec
- Coached by: Maurice Wilson
Medal record
Women's athletics
Representing Jamaica
Olympic Games
Silver medal – second place	2016 Rio de Janeiro	4 x 100 m relay
World Championships
Silver medal – second place	2023 Budapest	4 x 100 m relay
Bronze medal – third place	2017 London	4 x 100 m relay
Central American and Caribbean Games
Gold medal – first place	2018 Barranquilla	200 m
World Relays
Gold medal – first place	2017 Nassau	4 x 200 m relays
Silver medal – second place	2017 Nassau	4 x 100 m relay
Silver medal – second place	2019 Yokohama	4 x 100 m relay
Universiade
Gold medal – first place	2017 Taipei	100 m
NACAC Under-23 Championship
Gold medal – first place	2016 San Salvador	100 m
Silver medal – second place	2016 San Salvador	4 x 100 m relay

Shashalee Forbes (also Sashalee Forbes; born 10 May 1996) is a Jamaican athlete who specialises in the sprints. She has participated at both the 2016 and 2024 Summer Olympics, winning a silver medal for the 4×100 m relay in 2016.

== Biography ==
Forbes was born in Manchester, Jamaica where she attended Holmwood Technical High School, and represented the school at the ISSA Boys and Girls Championships.

== Career ==
In 2016, Forbes set a new 100 m personal best of 11.17 s at the Jamaican Championships to be selected for the Jamaican 4×100 m at the 2016 Summer Olympics. At the Olympics, Forbes ran in the heats of the 4×100 m and won a silver medal.

The following year, Forbes competed over 200 m at the 2017 World Championships in London, reaching the semi-finals. She went onto win a bronze medal as part of the 4×100 m team as Jamaica finished behind Great Britiain and the United States. At the 2017 Summer Universiade, she won gold over 100 m in a time of 11.18 s.

Forbes participated at the 2018 Commonwealth Games held on the Gold Coast, she made it to the final of the 200 m where she finished fifth before being disqualified. On 1 August 2018, she won gold over 200 m at the CAC Games in a time of 22.80 s.

In 2019, Forbes finished fourth over 200 m at the Jamaican Championships to qualify for the World Championships in Doha, where she made it to the semi-finals.

Forbes ran a big personal best over 60 m in finishing second behind Tina Clayton at the Gibson McCook Relays on 25 February 2023. On 13 May 2023, Forbes won over 100 m at the NACAC New Life Invitational in Freeport with a time of 11.17 s. She broke the 11-second barrier for the 100 m for the first time by finishing second at the USATF Bermuda Grand Prix in a time of 10.98 s. Forbes improved her personal best again at the 2023 Jamaican Championships as she finished second in 10.96 s. At the 2023 World Championships in Budapest, Forbes competed in the 100 m, where she made the semi-finals. In the 4×100 m relay, Forbes was part of the Jamaican quartet that won the silver medal, finishing behind the USA.

On 4 February 2024, Forbes won over 60 m at the ISTAF Indoor Düsseldorf meeting in a time of 7.11 s. She ran 7.15 s to finish fifth in her semi-final at the 2024 World Indoor Championships, failing to make it to the final. She finished fourth over 100 m at the Jamaican Championships in a time of 11.04 s to be named in the Jamaican team for the 4×100 m relay at the 2024 Summer Olympics. However, after Shericka Jackson pulled out of her events due to injury, Forbes competed over the individual 100 m, where she made the semi-finals.

In an interview with Pulse Sports in December 2024, she revealed that injuries hindered her performance for the last few seasons. Furthermore, when asked about the Paris Olympics, she expressed gratitude for the opportunity to compete, after Shericka withdrew from participation.

== Athletics achievements ==
Information from her World Athletics profile unless otherwise noted.

=== Personal bests ===
Type	Distance	Time (s)	Wind (m/s)	Venue	Date	Notes
Individual events
Outdoor	60 metres	7.03	+2.0	Kingston, Jamaica	25 February 2023	
Outdoor	60 metres	7.03	+0.6	Kingston, Jamaica	27 January 2024	
Outdoor	100 metres	10.96	+1.0	Kingston, Jamaica	7 July 2023	
Outdoor	200 metres	22.71	+0.8	Kingston, Jamaica	25 June 2017	
Outdoor	400 metres	59.82	—N/a	Spanish Town, Jamaica	11 February 2023	
Team events
Outdoor	4 × 100 metres relay	41.21	—N/a	Budapest, Hungary	26 August 2023	
Outdoor	4 × 200 metres relay	1:29.04	—N/a	Nassau, The Bahamas	22 April 2017	NR

=== International competitions ===
Representing Jamaica
Year	Competition	Venue	Position	Event	Time	Notes
2014	CAC Junior Championships	Morelia, Mexico	4th	100 m	11.76	
2014	CAC Junior Championships	Morelia, Mexico	—	200 m	DNS	
2014	CAC Junior Championships	Morelia, Mexico	2nd	4 x 100 m relay	44.33	
2014	World Junior Championships	Eugene, United States	2nd	4 x 100 m relay	43.97	SB
2015	Pan American Junior Championships	Edmonton, Canada	7th	100 m	11.73	
2015	Pan American Junior Championships	Edmonton, Canada	2nd	4 x 100 m relay	3:38.77	
2016	NACAC U23 Championships	San Salvador, El Salvador	1st	100 m	11.51	
2016	NACAC U23 Championships	San Salvador, El Salvador	2nd	4 x 100 m relay	43.63	
2016	Olympic Games	Rio de Janeiro, Brazil	2nd	4 x 100 m relay	41.79 (Note: Time from the heats; she did not run in the final)	
2017	World Relays	Nassau, The Bahamas	2nd	4 x 100 m relay	42.95	SB
2017	World Relays	Nassau, The Bahamas	1st	4 x 200 m relay	1:29.04	CR
2017	World Championships	London, United Kingdom	13th (sf)	200 m	23.09	
2017	World Championships	London, United Kingdom	3rd	4 x 100 m relay	42.19	SB
2017	Universiade	Taipei, Taiwan	1st	100 m	11.22	
2018	Commonwealth Games	Gold Coast, Australia	—	200 m	DQ	TR17.2.3
2018	Central American and Caribbean Games	Barranquilla, Colombia	1st	200 m	22.80	SB
2019	World Relays	Yokohama, Japan	2nd	4 x 100 m relay	43.29	
2019	Pan American Games	Lima, Peru	4th	4 x 100 m relay	43.74	
2019	World Championships	Doha, Qatar	20th (sf)	200 m	23.14	
2023	World Championships	Budapest, Hungary	14th (sf)	100 m	11.12	
2023	World Championships	Budapest, Hungary	2nd	4 x 100 m relay	41.21	SB
2024	World Indoor Championships	Glasgow, United Kingdom	11th (sf)	60 m	7.15	
2024	Olympic Games	Paris, France	16th (sf)	100 m	11.20	
2024	Olympic Games	Paris, France	5th	4 x 100 m relay	42.29	SB
