= Shericka Jackson =

Jamaican sprinter (born 1994)

The Honourable Shericka Jackson CD OD
- Shericka Jackson at a press conference during the Wanda Diamond League Athletissima athletics competition.

Personal information
- Born: 16 July 1994 (age 32) Saint Ann, Jamaica
- Height: 1.73 m (5 ft 8 in)
- Weight: 61 kg (134 lb)

Sport
- Country: Jamaica
- Sport: Track and field
- Event: Sprint
- Team: Puma & MVP Track Club
- Coached by: Paul Francis

Achievements and titles
- Olympic finals: 2016 Rio de Janeiro; 400 m, Bronze; 4 × 400 m, Silver; 2020 Tokyo; 100 m, Bronze; 4 × 100 m, Gold; 4 × 400 m, Bronze
- World finals: 2015 Beijing; 400 m, Bronze; 4 × 400 m, Gold; 2017 London; 400 m, 5th; 2019 Doha; 400 m, Bronze; 4 × 100 m, Gold; 4 × 400 m, Bronze; 2022 Eugene; 100 m, Silver; 200 m, Gold; 4 × 100 m, Silver; 2023 Budapest; 100 m, Silver; 200 m, Gold; 4 × 100 m, Silver
- Highest world ranking: 1st (200 m, 2023)
- Personal bests: 100 m: 10.65 (Kingston 2023); 200 m: 21.41 NR 2nd all time (Budapest 2023); 400 m: 49.47 (Doha 2019); Indoors; 60 m: 7.04i (Belgrade 2022)
Medal record
Women's athletics
Representing Jamaica
Olympic Games
Gold medal – first place	2020 Tokyo	4 × 100 m relay
Silver medal – second place	2016 Rio de Janeiro	4 × 400 m relay
Bronze medal – third place	2016 Rio de Janeiro	400 m
Bronze medal – third place	2020 Tokyo	100 m
Bronze medal – third place	2020 Tokyo	4 × 400 m relay
World Championships
Gold medal – first place	2015 Beijing	4 × 400 m relay
Gold medal – first place	2019 Doha	4 × 100 m relay
Gold medal – first place	2022 Eugene	200 m
Gold medal – first place	2023 Budapest	200 m
Silver medal – second place	2022 Eugene	100 m
Silver medal – second place	2022 Eugene	4 × 100 m relay
Silver medal – second place	2023 Budapest	100 m
Silver medal – second place	2023 Budapest	4 × 100 m relay
Bronze medal – third place	2015 Beijing	400 m
Bronze medal – third place	2019 Doha	400 m
Bronze medal – third place	2019 Doha	4 × 400 m relay
Bronze medal – third place	2025 Tokyo	200 m
Diamond League
First place	2022 Zurich	200 m
First place	2023 Eugene	100 m
First place	2023 Eugene	200 m
Second place	2022 Zurich	100 m
Second place	2021 Zurich	200 m
Commonwealth Games
Silver medal – second place	2018 Gold Coast	200 m
Pan American Games
Gold medal – first place	2019 Lima	400 m
NACAC Championships
Gold medal – first place	2018 Toronto	200 m
Gold medal – first place	2022 Freeport	100 m
Silver medal – second place	2018 Toronto	4 × 100 m relay
World Athletics Relays
Gold medal – first place	2017 Nassau	4 × 200 m relay
Gold medal – first place	2026 Gaborone	4 x 100 m relay
Silver medal – second place	2014 Nassau	4 × 400 m relay
Bronze medal – third place	2019 Yokohama	4 × 200 m relay
Bronze medal – third place	2025 Guangzhou	4 × 100 m relay

Shericka Jackson (born 16 July 1994) is a Jamaican sprinter competing in the 60 m, 100 m, 200 m, and 400 metres. In the 100 m, she is the joint seventh fastest woman of all time, while in the 200 m, she is the second fastest woman in history.

Jackson started her career as a 400 m sprinter, winning individual bronze medals at the 2015 World Championships, 2016 Rio Olympics, and 2019 World Championships. At these competitions, she won silver in the 4 × 400 m relay at the 2016 Olympics, then gold and bronze respectively at the 2015 and 2019 World Championships. At the 2019 Championships, she also won gold in the 4 × 100 m relay.

After Jackson shifted to shorter sprints in 2021 she won bronze in the 100 m at the 2020 Tokyo Olympics, also adding a gold in the 4 × 100 m relay. At the 2022 World Championships, she won gold in the 200 m setting a new national record, whilst also winning silver in the 100 m and 4 × 100 m relay. She was the 2022 Diamond League 200 m champion. The following year, she retained her 200 m title at the 2023 World Championships, running in 21.41 s, the second-fastest time in history. She also won silver medals in the 100 m and 4 × 100 m relays.

Jackson is the first athlete in World Championship history to win medals in the 100, 200 and 400 metres, including the 4 × 100 and 4 × 400 metres relays. She is also the second athlete in history, behind Marita Koch to win medals in the 100, 200, 400, 4 × 100 and 4 × 400 metres at the World Championships and/or the Olympic Games. With her personal bests of 10.65 s in the 100 m, 21.41 s in the 200 m and 49.47 s in the 400 m, she is one of few women to reach high marks in all three events. Jackson has run five of the world's 10 fastest 200 m times – second, third, fourth, sixth and eighth.

== Background ==
Jackson was born in Saint Ann, Jamaica. She participated in track and field at Steer Town Academy and Vere Technical schools. At age 14, she represented Jamaica at the 2008 CARIFTA Games.

== Career ==
=== 2008-2014: Early career ===
By 2009, Jackson had won age-group gold medals at the CARIFTA Games and the CACAC Junior Championships. She placed in the 200 m finals of the 2010 Youth Olympics, 2011 World Youth Championships (third), and the 2012 World Junior Championships.

In 2014, Jackson made her first professional appearance for Jamaica, competing in the 4 × 400 m relay at the inaugural World Relays in Nassau, winning a silver medal.

=== 2015-2016: Breakthrough, World and Olympic medals ===
At the Jamaican Championships in June, Jackson improved her 400 m personal best to 50.31 s to finish second and secure her place at the World Championships in Beijing. She followed it up by winning over 200 m at the Spitzen Leichtathletik Luzern meet in Lucerne, with a time of 22.87 s.

At the World Championships, Jackson won a shock bronze medal in the 400 m, running 49.99 s, her first sub-50 clocking. In the 4 × 400 m relay, Jackson was part of the Jamaican quartet that won gold over the United States.

The following year, in June, Jackson ran her first sub-51 clocking of the season to win at the Racers Grand Prix in 50.72 s. At the Jamaican Championships, she finished third over 400 m to secure her place at the Olympics in Rio de Janeiro.

At the Olympics, Jackson took the bronze medal over 400 m, finishing behind Shaunae Miller-Uibo and Allyson Felix in 49.85 s. She had previously run a new personal best of 49.83 s in the heats. She followed her strong performance up by winning a silver medal in the 4 × 400 m relay. On 9 September, at the Diamond League Final in Brussels, she finished fourth over 400 m in 50.73 s.

=== 2017-2020: Continued success ===
In April, Jackson ran a new 200 m personal best of 22.57 s at the UTech Classic in Kingston. Later that month, she won a gold medal in the 4 × 200 m relay at the World Relays in Yokohama.

Jackson continued her strong form by winning over 400 m at the Jamaican Championships in a season's best of 50.05 s. At the World Championships in London, she finished fifth in the 400 m final in 50.76 s. She once again improved her 200 m personal best to 22.46 s at the ISTAF Berlin meet on 27 August. At the Diamond League Final in Brussels, Jackson finished fifth over 400 m clocking a time of 51.16 s.

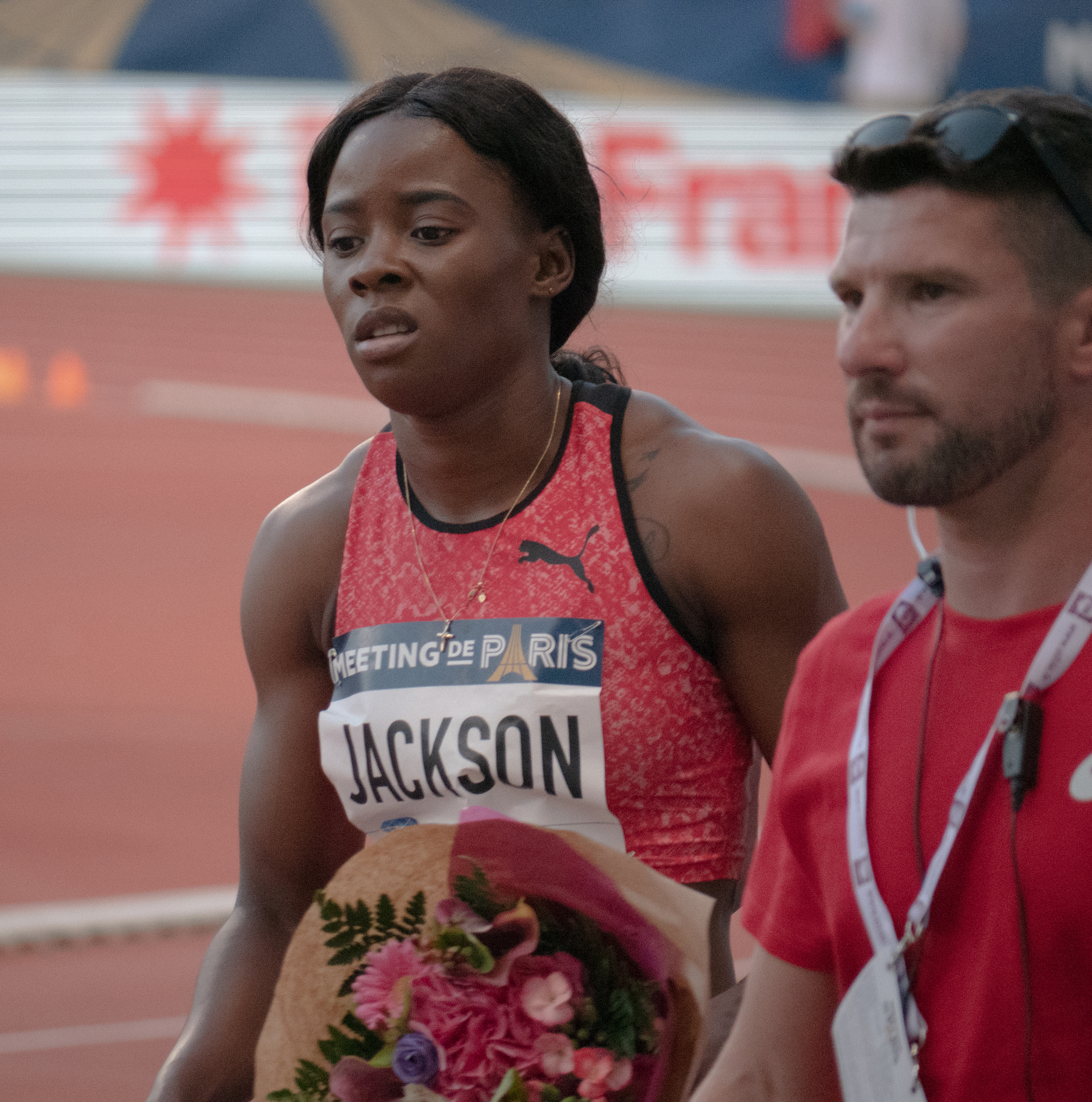
Jackson after winning over 200 m at the Paris Diamond League

In 2018, she competed at the Commonwealth Games held on the Gold Coast in April, winning a silver medal over 200 m, running a personal best of 22.18 s. At the Jamaican Championships, Jackson dropped down in distance to finish third over 100 m in a personal best of 11.13 s, before winning the 200 m in a time of 22.28 s. She followed it up by recording her first ever Diamond League win in Paris, emerging victorious over 200 m in a personal best of 22.05 s.

At the inaugural Athletics World Cup held in London, Jackson won gold over 200 m in 22.35 s and silver in the 4 × 100 m relay. In August, she competed at the NACAC Championships, also winning gold over 200 m and silver in the 4 × 100 m relay. At the Diamond League Final, she finished fourth in the 200 m in 22.72 s. Jackson also finished fourth over the same distance at the Continental Cup in Prague, clocking 22.62 s.

In May 2019, Jackson competed at the World Relays in Yokohama, winning a bronze medal in the 4 × 200 m relay. Later that year in June, she finished second over her specialist 400 m distance at the Rome Diamond League, running a time of 51.05 s. She competed at the Jamaican Championships later that month, winning the 400 m in a new personal best of 49.78 s. She followed it up with a strong performance to win at the London Diamond League in 50.69 s.

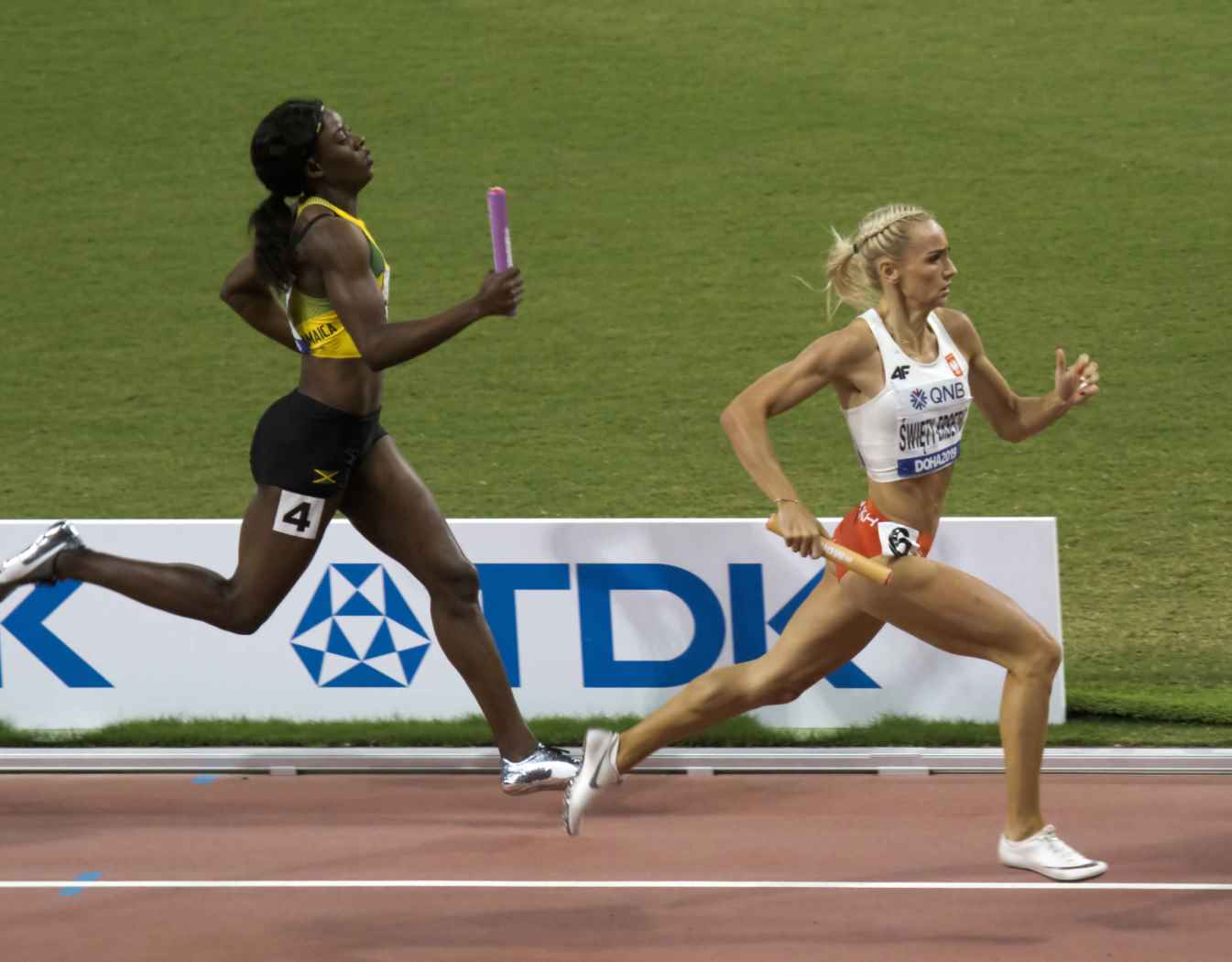
Jackson behind Justyna Swiety-Ersetic in the 4 × 400 m final at the 2019 World Championships

At the Pan American Games in Lima, Jackson won the 400 m in 50,78 s, pulling away from Paola Moran and Courtney Okolo in the last 100 m to secure her victory. She followed her success up by competing at the World Championships in Doha, winning a bronze medal in the 400 m in a new personal best of 49.47 s. In the 4 × 100 m relay, Jackson anchored Jamaica to win her first World Championship gold medal, whilst also winning her second bronze medal of the Championships in the 4 × 400 m relay.

=== 2021: Switch to short sprints and 100 m Olympic bronze medal ===
Under the guidance of renowned coach Stephen Francis, Jackson switched to the 100 m and 200 m sprints for the 2021 season. On 29 May, she ran a new 100 m personal best of 11.02 s at the Olympic Destiny Series 2 meet in Kingston. At the Jamaican Olympic Trials, she finished second in the 100 m behind Shelly-Ann Fraser-Pryce in a time of 10.82 s, having run a personal best of 10.77 s in the semi-finals. Meanwhile, in the 200 m, Jackson once again finished second behind Fraser-Pryce in a personal best of 21.82 s, her first time under the 22-second barrier.

She came third in the 100 m at the delayed 2020 Tokyo Olympics with another personal best of 10.76 s, just behind fellow country woman Shelly-Ann Fraser-Pryce who clocked 10.74 s. The Jamaicans swept the medal stand in the event for the second time in history as Elaine Thompson-Herah took the gold medal in 10.61 s. In the 200 m, she failed to advance out of the heats after she eased down before the finish line and was passed by Dalia Kaddari for the third automatic qualifying spot by four-thousandths of a second; her time of 23.26 s was not fast enough to earn one of the non-automatic qualifying places. She recovered from her disappointment to win the gold medal in the 4 × 100 m relay, with the Jamaican quartet running 41.02 s, the second-fastest time ever at the time. Jackson also ran in the women's 4 × 400 m relay, winning a bronze medal.

In her first post-Olympic race, Jackson equalled her 100 m personal best of 10.76 s to finish third at the Prefontaine Classic on 21 August, in a Jamaican 1-2-3 with Elaine Thompson-Herah and Shelly-Ann Fraser-Pryce. She followed it up with another third place at the Lausanne Diamond League in 10.92 s, finishing behind Thompson-Herah and Fraser-Pryce. Over 200 m, at the Memorial Van Damme on 3 September, she was edged out by Christine Mboma, clocking a time of 21.95 s. At the Diamond League Final, Jackson ran a new 200 m personal best of 21.81 s, narrowly finishing behind Mboma.

=== 2022: World 200 m title and NACAC 100 m title ===
In March, Jackson competed over 60 m at the World Indoor Championships in Belgrade, running a personal best of 7.04 s to finish sixth. In her first Diamond League of the season in Doha on 13 May, she finished second behind Gabrielle Thomas over 200 m, in 22.07 s. She followed it up with a third-placed finish at the Prefontaine Classic on 28 May, clocking 10.92 s to finish behind Elaine Thompson-Herah and Sha'Carri Richardson. Jackson won over 200 m at the Rome Diamond League, running a time of 21.91 s. At the Jamaican Championships, she won the 100 m in 10.77 s, only 0.01 s behind her personal best. In the 200 m, she stormed to a new personal best of 21.55 s to win over Thompson-Herah.

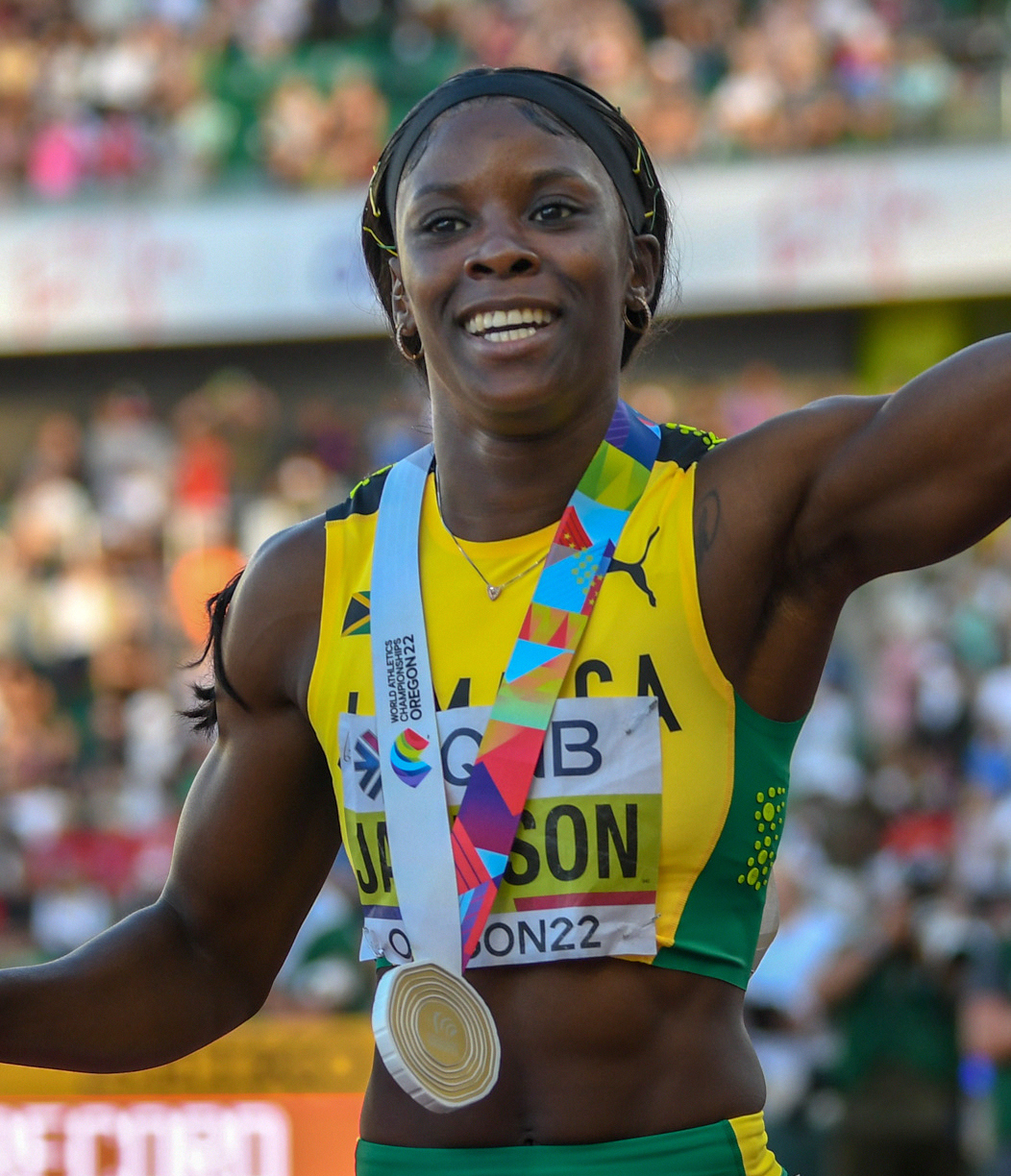
Jackson after winning 200 m at the 2022 World Championships

At the World Championships in Eugene, Jackson won silver over 100 m in a new personal best of 10.73 s, being part of a Jamaican 1-2-3 as Shelly-Ann Fraser-Pryce won gold in 10.69 s and Elaine Thompson-Herah won bronze in 10.81 s. She went on to win over 200 m in 21.45 s, setting a new Championship record and moving her up to second on the all-time lists. She also competed in the 4 × 100 m, winning a silver medal behind the United States.

On 6 August, Jackson won the 200 m at the Silesia Diamond League in 21.84 s. Two days later, she also won over the same distance at the Gyulai István Memorial, running a time of 22.02 s. She improved her 100 m personal best to 10.71 s in finishing second behind Shelly-Ann Fraser-Pryce at the Monaco Diamond League on 10 August. At the 2022 NACAC Championships in Freeport, Jackson won gold in the 100 m, running a Championship record of 10.82 s. She won again at the Brussels Diamond League on 2 September, running 10.73 s over 100 m, her second-fastest time. At the Diamond League Final in Zürich, she finished second behind Fraser-Pryce in the 100 m, running 10.81 s, but she recovered to win the 200 m in 21.80 s.

=== 2023: Second World 200 m title and second-fastest 200 m time ===
In her first 100 m of the season, Jackson ran 10.82 s to win at the MVP Velocity Fest 13 meet in Kingston. She finished second behind Sha'Carri Richardson at the Doha Diamond League on 5 May, clocking a time of 10.85 s. She continued her good form by winning the 200 m at the Rabat Diamond League, in 21.98 s. On 3 June, Jackson ran a season's best of 10.78 s over 100 m to win at the Racers Grand Prix in Kingston. At the Jamaican Championships, Jackson won the 100 m in a new personal best and world lead of 10.65 s, moving her up to fifth on the all-time toplists. She returned for the 200 m, winning in 21.71 s, a new world lead. On 21 July, she won over 200 m against a strong field at the Monaco Diamond League, clocking 21.86 s.

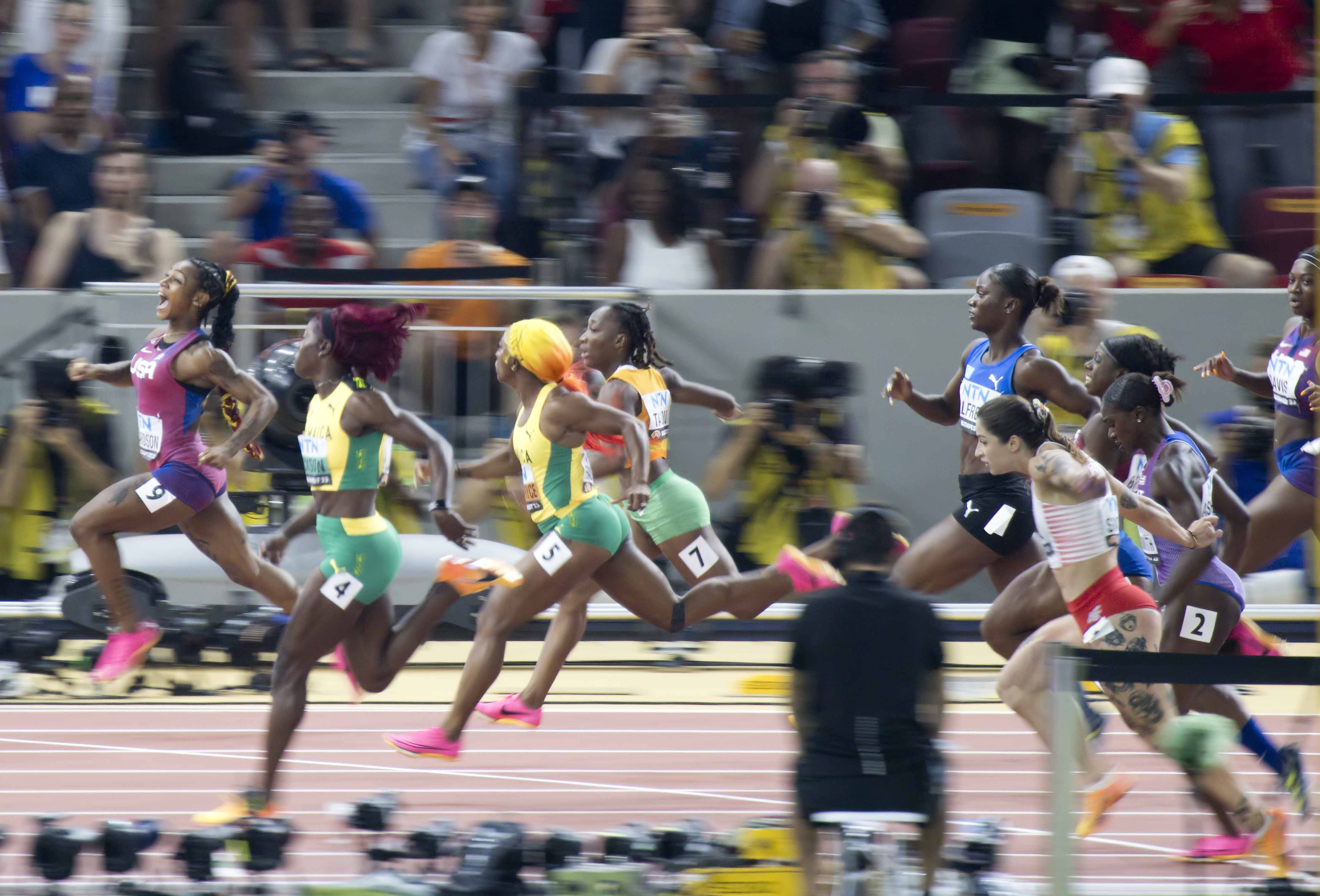
Jackson finishing in second in the 100 m final at the 2023 World Championships

At the 2023 World Championships in Budapest, Jackson a silver medal over 100 m, running 10.72 s to finish behind Sha'Carri Richardson who ran 10.65 s. In the 200 m, she retained her gold medal in 21.41 s, the second-fastest time ever and a new Jamaican record. Jackson also competed in the 4 × 100 m relay, anchoring Jamaican to the silver medal behind the United States, who were anchored by Richardson.

After the Championships, she secured victory in the 200 m at the Zürich Diamond League, running a time of 21.82 s to win over second-placed Daryll Neita. She won again at the Brussels Diamond League, clocking a new Diamond League record of 21.48 s, her third-fastest time ever and the fourth fastest overall. At the Diamond League Final in Eugene on 16 September, Jackson won over 100 m, clocking 10.70 s to win by 0.05 s from Marie Josée Ta Lou-Smith. She returned the following day to also take home the 200 m title, running a meeting record of 21.57 s. Jackson ended the season with six out of the top ten fastest 200 m times of the year.

=== 2024-2025: Injury problems and World Relays bronze ===
On 19 May, Jackson won the 200 m at the Marrakesh Diamond League in a time of 22.82 s. She placed a disappointing fifth over 200 m at the Bislett Games, ending her two-year unbeaten streak in the event. She returned to winning ways at the Stockholm Diamond League, running a season's best of 22.69 s despite a -2.0 headwind to beat Julia Henriksson. At the Jamaican Championships, she won the 100 m in 10.84 s, before also taking the 200 m title in 22.29 s, narrowly holding off Lanae-Tava Thomas who ran 22.34 s. However, after pulling up injured in the 200 m at the Gyulai István Memorial, Jackson was forced to withdraw from the Olympics in Paris with injury.

The following year, she opened her outdoor season over 300 m at the Miramar Invitational on 5 April, finishing second behind Julien Alfred in a personal best of 36.13 s. She competed at the World Relays in Guangzhou, winning a bronze medal in the 4 × 100 m. On 25 May, she won over 100 m at the Rabat Diamond League, clocking a time of 11.04 s. Jackson improved her 200 m season's best to 22.53 s to win at the Racers Grand Prix in Kingston on 7 June. She placed fourth at the women's 100m final at the 2025 World Athletics Championships, behind Julien Alfred, Tina Clayton, and Melissa Jefferson-Wooden. She won the bronze medal in the 200m at the same championships in a time of 22.18s.

=== 2026 ===
Shericka opened the season at Velocity Fest 18 in Kingston, Jamaica running the 400 metres in 52.04s to win. A month later at Velocity Fest 19, she competed in the 400 metres again, this time recording 52.55s for second behind training partner Barbadian Sada Williams.

On May 2, at the 2026 World Athletics Relays - Women's 4 × 100 metres relay in Gaborone, Botswana, she raced on the first leg of the heats to qualify the team to the finals. They won in a season best 41.96s. She did not run in the finals. The next day, they won gold in a time of 42.00 with Thompson Herah showcasing her stellar talent on the anchor leg.

At the 2026 Shanghai Diamond league, she won her first 200 metres of the season in 22.07s against a stacked field that included Shaunae Miller-Uibo and Shacarri Richardson.

== Achievements ==
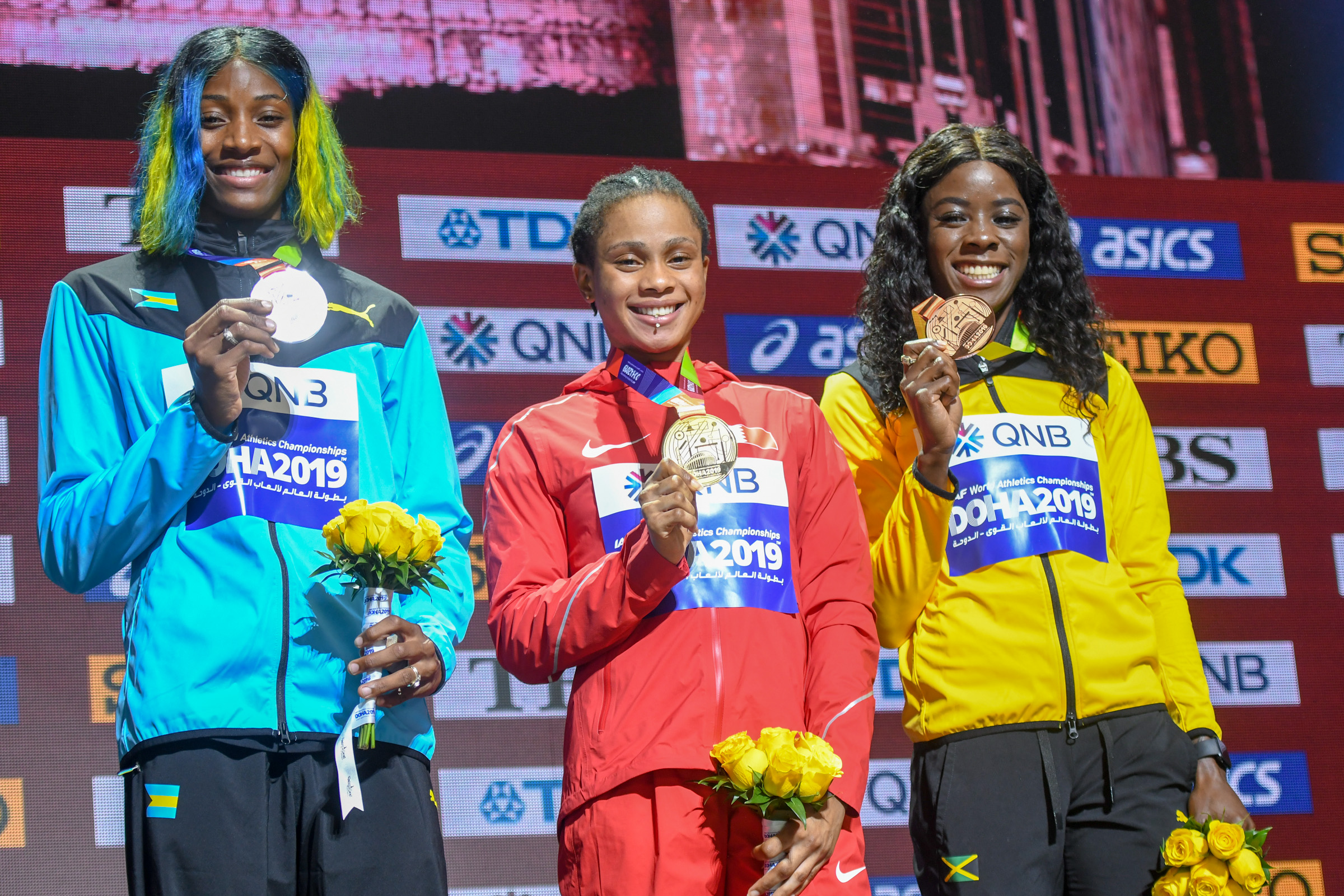
Jackson won 400 m bronze at the 2019 World Championships.

Information from World Athletics profile.

=== Personal bests ===
Event	Time (s)	Wind (m/s)	Venue	Date	Notes
60 metres	7.23	-1.2	Spanish Town, Jamaica	5 February 2022	
60 metres indoor	7.04	—N/a	Belgrade, Serbia	18 March 2022	
100 metres	10.65	+1.0	Kingston, Jamaica	7 July 2023	6th of all time
200 metres	21.41	+0.1	Budapest, Hungary	25 August 2023	NR, 2nd of all time
400 metres	49.47	—N/a	Doha, Qatar	3 October 2019	

=== International competitions ===
Representing Jamaica
Year	Competition	Venue	Position	Event	Time
2008	CARIFTA Games (U17)	Basseterre, Saint Kitts and Nevis	1st	400 m	54.52
2008	CARIFTA Games (U17)	Basseterre, Saint Kitts and Nevis	1st	4 × 400 m relay	3:39.62
2009	CARIFTA Games (U17)	Vieux Fort, Saint Lucia	1st	200 m	23.62
2009	CARIFTA Games (U17)	Vieux Fort, Saint Lucia	1st	400 m	53.48
2009	CARIFTA Games (U17)	Vieux Fort, Saint Lucia	1st	4 × 100 m relay	45.05
2009	CARIFTA Games (U17)	Vieux Fort, Saint Lucia	1st	4 × 400 m relay	3:38:09
2010	CARIFTA Games (U18)	George Town, Cayman Islands	1st	200 m	23.64 w
2010	CARIFTA Games (U18)	George Town, Cayman Islands	2nd	400 m	53.71
2010	CARIFTA Games (U18)	George Town, Cayman Islands	1st	4 × 100 m relay	45.98
2010	CARIFTA Games (U18)	George Town, Cayman Islands	1st	4 × 400 m relay	3:44.02
2010	Central American and Caribbean; Junior Championships (U18)	Santo Domingo, Dominican Republic	1st	200 m	24.23
2010	Central American and Caribbean; Junior Championships (U18)	Santo Domingo, Dominican Republic	1st	4 × 100 m relay	45.67
2010	Central American and Caribbean; Junior Championships (U18)	Santo Domingo, Dominican Republic	1st	4 × 400 m relay	3:43.08
2010	World Junior Championships	Moncton, Canada	4th	4 × 100 m relay	44.68 (Note: Time from the heats; Jackson was replaced in the final.)
2010	Youth Olympic Games	Singapore	4th	200 m	24.08
2011	CARIFTA Games (U20)	Montego Bay, Jamaica	2nd	200 m	23.48
2011	CARIFTA Games (U20)	Montego Bay, Jamaica	1st	4 × 100 m relay	44.08
2011	World Youth Championships	Villeneuve-d'Ascq, France	3rd	200 m	23.62
2011	World Youth Championships	Villeneuve-d'Ascq, France	1st	Medley relay	2:03.42
2012	CARIFTA Games (U20)	Hamilton, Bermuda	3rd	200 m	24.03
2012	CARIFTA Games (U20)	Hamilton, Bermuda	2nd	4 × 100 m relay	45.18
2012	Central American and Caribbean; Junior Championships (U20)	San Salvador, El Salvador	2nd	200 m	23.87
2012	Central American and Caribbean; Junior Championships (U20)	San Salvador, El Salvador	1st	4 × 400 m relay	3:37.21
2012	World Junior Championships	Barcelona, Spain	8th	200 m	23.53
2012	World Junior Championships	Barcelona, Spain	2nd	4 × 400 m relay	3:32.97
2013	CARIFTA Games (U20)	Nassau, Bahamas	2nd	200 m	22.84
2013	CARIFTA Games (U20)	Nassau, Bahamas	1st	4 × 400 m relay	3:34.36
2014	World Relays	Nassau, Bahamas	2nd	4 × 400 m relay	3:23.26
2015	World Championships	Beijing, China	3rd	400 m	49.99
2015	World Championships	Beijing, China	1st	4 × 400 m relay	3:19.13 WL
2016	Olympic Games	Rio de Janeiro, Brazil	3rd	400 m	49.85
2016	Olympic Games	Rio de Janeiro, Brazil	2nd	4 × 400 m relay	3:20.34
2017	World Relays	Nassau, Bahamas	1st	4 × 200 m relay	1:29.04 CR NR
2017	World Championships	London, United Kingdom	5th	400 m	50.76
2017	World Championships	London, United Kingdom	DNF	4 × 400 m relay	DNF
2018	Commonwealth Games	Gold Coast, Australia	2nd	200 m	22.18
2018	World Cup	London, United Kingdom	1st	200 m	22.35
2018	World Cup	London, United Kingdom	2nd	4 × 100 m relay	42.60
2018	NACAC Championships	Toronto, Canada	1st	200 m	22.64
2018	NACAC Championships	Toronto, Canada	2nd	4 × 100 m relay	43.33
2019	World Relays	Yokohama, Japan	3rd	4 × 200 m relay	1:33.21
2019	Pan American Games	Lima, Peru	1st	400 m	50.73
2019	World Championships	Doha, Qatar	3rd	400 m	49.47 PB
2019	World Championships	Doha, Qatar	1st	4 × 100 m relay	41.44 WL
2019	World Championships	Doha, Qatar	3rd	4 × 400 m relay	3:22.37
2021	Olympic Games	Tokyo, Japan	3rd	100 m	10.76
2021	Olympic Games	Tokyo, Japan	29th (h)	200 m	23.26
2021	Olympic Games	Tokyo, Japan	1st	4 × 100 m relay	41.02 NR
2021	Olympic Games	Tokyo, Japan	3rd	4 × 400 m relay	3:21.24 SB
2022	World Indoor Championships	Belgrade, Serbia	6th	60 m	7.04
2022	World Championships	Eugene, United States	2nd	100 m	10.73
2022	World Championships	Eugene, United States	1st	200 m	21.45
2022	World Championships	Eugene, United States	2nd	4 × 100 m relay	41.18 SB
2022	NACAC Championships	Freeport, Bahamas	1st	100 m	10.83
2023	World Championships	Budapest, Hungary	2nd	100 m	10.72
2023	World Championships	Budapest, Hungary	1st	200 m	21.41 CR, NR
2023	World Championships	Budapest, Hungary	2nd	4 × 100 m relay	41.21
2025	World Relays	Guangzhou, China	3rd	4 × 100 m relay	42.33
2025	World Championships	Tokyo, Japan	4th	100 m	10.88
2025	World Championships	Tokyo, Japan	3rd	200 m	22.18
2026	World Relays	Gaborone, Botswana	1st	4 × 100 m relay	42.00

=== Circuit wins and titles ===
- Diamond League champion 100 m: 2023
- Diamond League champion 200 m: 2022, 2023
  - 2018: Paris Meeting (200 m)
  - 2019: London Anniversary Games (400 m)
  - 2021: Stockholm Bauhaus-Galan (200 m)
  - 2022: Rome Golden Gala (200 m, MR SB), Chorzów Kamila Skolimowska Memorial (200 m, MR), Brussels Memorial Van Damme (100 m), Zürich Weltklasse (200 m)
  - 2023: Rabat Meeting International (200 m, MR SB), Monaco Herculis (200 m), Zürich (200 m), Brussels (200 m, DLR MR), Eugene Prefontaine Classic (100 m & 200 m, MR )

=== National titles ===
- Jamaican Athletics Championships
  - 200 metres: 2018, 2022, 2023
  - 400 metres: 2017, 2019
  - 100 metres: 2022, 2023
