= Daina Levy =

Jamaican hammer thrower

Personal information
- Born: 27 May 1993 (age 33) Mississauga, Canada

Sport
- Sport: Track and field
- Event: Hammer throw

Daina Levy (born 27 May 1993) is a Jamaican hammer thrower. She competed at the 2016 Summer Olympics in the women's hammer throw event; her result in the qualifying round did not qualify her for the final.

Levy was born in Canada and represented Canada at the 2010 World Junior Championships in Athletics, but she later changed allegiance to Jamaica as both her parents were from Jamaica. She was an All-American for the Kansas Jayhawks track and field team, finishing 3rd in the weight throw at the 2016 NCAA Division I Indoor Track and Field Championships.

Outdoor

Discipline	Performance	Wind	Place	Date	Records	Results Score
Shot Put	13.85		Powder Springs, GA (USA)	16 April 2011		824
Discus Throw	53.73		Austin, TX (USA)	29 May 2015		956
Hammer Throw	71.48		Lawrence, KS (USA)	25 June 2016	NR	1117
