= Kateema Riettie =

Jamaican javelin thrower (born 1973)

Personal information
- Born: 5 December 1973 (age 52)

Sport
- Sport: Track and field
Medal record
Representing Jamaica
Central American and Caribbean Games
| Gold medal – first place | 2010 Mayaguez | Javelin throw |

Kateema Riettie (born 5 December 1973) is a Jamaican female track and field athlete who competes in the javelin throw. She is a nine-time national champion, taking titles from 2002 to 2017. Riettie has had success at the regional level, including a gold medal at the 2010 Central American and Caribbean Games and minor medals at the Central American and Caribbean Championships in Athletics in 2003 and 2008.

Riettie has also represented Jamaica at the 2010 Commonwealth Games and 2011 Pan American Games, being a finalist at both events. She is based in Bridgeport, Connecticut, where she works as a fitness instructor for the local police department. She moved to the American city in 1989 and attended Southern Connecticut State University, for which she competed athletically.

In 2024, while working as a police officer, Riettie left her firearm unattended at a special events detail.

== International competitions ==
| Year | Competition | Venue | Position | Event | Notes |
|---|---|---|---|---|---|
| 2003 | CAC Championships | St. George's, Grenada | 2nd | Javelin throw | 51.36 m |
| 2005 | CAC Championships | Nassau, Bahamas | 5th | Javelin throw | 51.61 m |
| 2008 | CAC Championships | Cali, Colombia | 3rd | Javelin throw | 54.90 m |
| 2010 | CAC Games | Mayagüez, Puerto Rico | 1st | Javelin throw | 53.77 m |
| 2010 | Commonwealth Games | New Delhi, India | 6th | Javelin throw | 53.80 m |
| 2011 | Pan American Games | Guadalajara, Mexico | 8th | Javelin throw | 50.97 m |
| 2018 | CAC Games | Barranquilla, Colombia | 6th | Javelin throw | 42.23 m |

== National titles ==
- Jamaican Athletics Championships
  - Javelin throw: 2002, 2003, 2007, 2010, 2012, 2013, 2014, 2016, 2017
