= Chanice Porter =

Jamaican long jumper (born 1994)

Personal information
- Nationality: Jamaican
- Born: 25 May 1994 (age 32)

Sport
- Sport: Athletics
- Event: Long jump
Medal record
NACAC Championships
| Bronze medal – third place | 2022 Freeport | Long jump |
World Youth Championships
| Gold medal – first place | 2011 Lille | Long jump |
| Bronze medal – third place | 2011 Lille | High jump |

Chanice Porter (born 25 May 1994) is a Jamaican track and field athlete who specializes in long jump. She represented Jamaica at the 2019 World Athletics Championships, competing in women's long jump.

She represented Jamaica at the 2020 and 2024 Summer Olympics.

== High school career ==
An athletic standout at Manchester High School, she competed primarily in the high jump and long jump events at the junior level. However, as a class four athlete, she finished sixth in the 100 metres.

At the 2008 ISSA Boys and Girls Champs, Porter earned fourth and sixth-place finishes in the long jump and high jump respectively. These finishes were improved upon at the 2009 championships. Here, she earned a bronze medal in the high jump and silver in the long jump events in the Girls Class 3 category.

She went on to set a meet record of 6.43 metres in the long jump event at the 2010 championships.

Porter earned silver medals in the Class 2 high jump and long jump events at the 2011 staging of the championships. She completed her high school career by earning gold medal finishes in both the Class 1 high jump and long jump. She posted new meet records of 1.86 metres and 6.52 metres respectively, erasing the previous high jump record which had stood for 9 years prior.

== NCAA career ==
Competing for the Georgia Bulldogs women's track and field team, Porter won the 2016 long jump at the NCAA Division I Outdoor Track and Field Championships.
