= Kemoy Campbell =

Jamaican athlete

Personal information
- Born: January 14, 1991 (age 35) Mandeville, Jamaica

Sport
- Country: Jamaica
- Sport: Track and Field
- Event(s): 1500 meters, Mile, 5000 meters
- College team: South Plains College; Arkansas Razorbacks
- Club: Reebok
- Turned pro: 2015

Achievements and titles
- Olympic finals: 2016; 5000 m, 25th (h)
- World finals: 2015; 5000 m, 31st (h); 2017; 5000 m, 10th
- Personal bests: 800 m: 1:49.95 (Lubbock 2012); 1500 m: 3:41.00 (Eugene 2013); Indoor Mile: 4:00.98i NR (Fayetteville 2013); 3000 m: 7:41.87 NR (Kingston 2017); Indoor 3000 m: 7:40.79i NR (New York 2016); 5000 m: 13:20.39 NR (Palo Alto 2015); Indoor 5000 m: 13:14.45i NR (Boston 2017); 10,000 m: 28:06.40 NR (Palo Alto 2017)
Medal record
Men's athletics
Representing Jamaica
CARIFTA Games
Gold medal – first place	2007 Providenciales	U17 boy's 1500m
Gold medal – first place	2007 Providenciales	U17 boy's 3000m
Gold medal – first place	2008 Basseterre	U20 men's 5000m
Gold medal – first place	2009 Vieux Fort	U20 men's 5000m
Gold medal – first place	2010 George Town	U20 men's 1500m
Gold medal – first place	2010 George Town	U20 men's 5000m
Silver medal – second place	2006 Les Abymes	U17 boy's 1500m
Silver medal – second place	2006 Les Abymes	U17 boy's 3000m
Silver medal – second place	2008 Basseterre	U20 men's 1500m
Silver medal – second place	2009 Vieux Fort	U20 men's 1500m
Central American and Caribbean Junior Championships
Gold medal – first place	2010 Santo Domingo	U20 men's 1500m
NACAC Cross Country Championships
Gold medal – first place	2010 Tobago	U20 men's 6K
Gold medal – first place	2010 Santo Domingo	U20 men's 1500m

Kemoy Campbell (born January 14, 1991) is a retired Jamaican distance runner who competed in various events from 800 meters to 5000 metres. Since competing in the American collegiate circuit, he has developed a reputation for having remarkable range, having competitive experience from the 800 meters to the 10K. Campbell holds multiple Jamaican records in athletics.

== Running career ==
=== Youth ===
As a youngster, Campbell ran on the track team of Bellefield High School, in Manchester Parish, Jamaica. Although the overwhelming majority on the team were sprinters, Campbell was coached for distance running; one of his first races was a 5K road race. While still in Bellefield HS, Campbell was scouted by the University of Arkansas, the school he would attend many years later. In 2010, he became the first Jamaican high schooler to win the high school boys 3000m at the Penn Relays.

=== Collegiate ===
Campbell first ran with South Plains College of Levelland, Texas, with whom he won NJCAA titles in the 800 meters and in cross country. He subsequently transferred to the same university which had scouted him back in Jamaica, University of Arkansas. At Arkansas, Campbell was coached by Chris Bucknam. At the 2013 NCAA DI Outdoor T&F Championships, Campbell placed fifth in the men's 5000 meters final and placed second in the men's 3000 meters at the 2013 NCAA Division 1 Indoor Track and Field Championships.

=== Professional ===
Campbell opened the indoor season with an altitude 4:02.59 mile in Flagstaff, Arizona representing New Balance on January 22, 2016. Campbell set a PR and Jamaican indoor record in the men's 3000 meters representing New Balance at the 2016 Millrose Games on February 20.

Kemoy Campbell placed fifth in 13:30.09 in the 5000 metres on May 20, 2016 at the Hoka One One Mid Distance Classic hosted by Occidental College.

On February 26, 2017, Campbell ran 13:14.45 indoors at the BU Last Chance meet to break the Jamaican 5000m record.

Kemoy added a fourth national championship title to his collection on June 23, 2017, when he won the 5000m.

On August 12, 2017, Kemoy became the first male Jamaican distance runner to compete in a final at the IAAF World Championships in London. He finished 10th with a time of 13:39.74.

During the Millrose Games in 2019, Campbell lost consciousness due to sudden cardiac arrest, and CPR was performed by bystanders. A defibrillator had to be used to revive him. Campbell was setting the pace in the men's 3000m event.

On September 5, 2019, Campbell announced his retirement from competitive running.

He is currently coaching track and has been forced to limit his physical activity on the orders of his cardiologist.
