= Jamaican Athletics Championships =

Annual outdoor track and field competition

- Sport: Track and field
- Country: Jamaica

The Jamaican Athletics Championships is an annual outdoor track and field competition organised by the Jamaica Athletics Administrative Association, which serves as the national championship for the sport in Jamaica.

== Events ==
The number of athletics events on the Jamaican Championship competition programme varies according to demand. Several events almost always feature on the programme for both men and women, including: the three sprint events (100 m, 200 m and 400 m), the two middle-distance events (800 m and 1500 m), two hurdles events (sprint hurdles and 400 m hurdles), two horizontal jumping events (long jump and triple jump) and three throwing events (shot put, discus throw and javelin throw). Beyond these 12 core events, it is common for other national championship events to be skipped due to lack of entrants. These include long-distance events (5000 m and 10,000 m), the pole vault and high jump, and the hammer throw. On rare occasions, national championships events for steeplechase and combined track and field events have taken place.

Track running

- 100 metres, 200 metres, 400 metres, 800 metres, 1500 metres, 5000 metres (non-regular), 10,000 metres (non-regular)

Obstacle events

- 100 metres hurdles (women only), 110 metres hurdles (men only), 400 metres hurdles

Jumping events

- Pole vault (non-regular), high jump (non-regular), long jump, triple jump

Throwing events

- Shot put, discus throw, javelin throw, hammer throw (non-regular)

== Championships records ==
=== Men ===
Event	Record	Athlete/Team	Date	Place	Ref.
100 m	9.75 (+1.1 m/s)	Yohan Blake	29 June 2012	Kingston	
200 m					
400 m					
400 m hurdles	47.42	Malik James-King	28 June 2024	Kingston	

=== Women ===
Event	Record	Athlete/Team	Date	Place	Ref.
100 m	10.65 (+1.0 m/s)	Shericka Jackson	7 July 2023	Kingston	
200 m	21.55 (±0.0 m/s)	Shericka Jackson	26 June 2022	Kingston	
800 m	1:57.84	Natoya Goule-Topp	26 June 2021	Kingston	
100 m hurdles	12.28 (+0.5 m/s) NR	Ackera Nugent	30 June 2024	Kingston	
400 m hurdles	52.51	Rushell Clayton	28 June 2024	Kingston	
