= Athletics at the 2019 Pan American Games – Qualification =

The following is the qualification system for the Athletics at the 2019 Pan American Games competition.

== Qualification system ==
A total of 740 athletes will qualify to compete. Each nation may enter a maximum of two athletes in each individual event, and one team per relay event. Each event has a maximum number of competitors and a minimum performance standard. Peru as host nation, is granted an automatic athlete slot per event, in the event no one qualifies for that respective event.

The winner of each individual event (plus top two relay teams per event), from three regional qualification tournaments automatically qualified with the standard (even if not reached). If an event quota is not filled, athletes will be invited till the maximum number per event is reached.

For relays, each country can enter two relay only competitors to participate. The other members of each relay team must be registered in an individual event.

Qualifying standards must be achieved between 1 January 2018 and 23 June 2019.

== Qualification timeline ==
Events	Date	Venue
2018 South American Games	5–8 June 2018	Cochabamba, Bolivia
2018 Central American and Caribbean Games	29 July–3 August 2018	Barranquilla, Colombia
2018 NACAC Championships	10–12 August 2018	Toronto, Canada

== Quota per event ==
Men's events		Women's events	
Event	Quota	Event	Quota
Men's 100 metres	24	Women's 100 metres	24
Men's 200 metres	24	Women's 200 metres	24
Men's 400 metres	18	Women's 400 metres	18
Men's 800 metres	16	Women's 800 metres	16
Men's 1500 metres	14	Women's 1500 metres	14
Men's 5000 metres	14	Women's 5000 metres	14
Men's 10,000 metres	14	Women's 10,000 metres	14
Men's marathon	18	Women's marathon	18
Men's 3000 steeplechase	14	Women's 3000 steeplechase	14
Men's 110 metres hurdles	16	Women's 100 metres hurdles	16
Men's 400 metres hurdles	16	Women's 400 metres hurdles	16
Men's high jump	14	Women's high jump	14
Men's pole vault	14	Women's pole vault	14
Men's long jump	16	Women's long jump	16
Men's triple jump	16	Women's triple jump	16
Men's shot put	14	Women's shot put	14
Men's discus throw	14	Women's discus throw	14
Men's hammer throw	14	Women's hammer throw	14
Men's javelin throw	14	Women's javelin throw	14
Men's decathlon	14	Women's heptathlon	14
Men's 20 kilometres walk	14	Women's 20 kilometres walk	14
Men's 50 kilometres walk	14	Women's 50 kilometres walk	14
Men's 4x100 metres relay	12 teams	Women's 4x100 metres relay	12 teams
Men's 4x400 metres relay	12 teams	Women's 4x400 metres relay	12 teams

== Qualification standards ==
Men's events		Women's events	
Event	Standard	Event	Standard
Men's 100 metres	10.30	Women's 100 metres	11.60
Men's 200 metres	20.60	Women's 200 metres	23.40
Men's 400 metres	46.10	Women's 400 metres	53.45
Men's 800 metres	1:48.80	Women's 800 metres	2:04.00
Men's 1500 metres	3:47.50	Women's 1500 metres	4:22.00
Men's 5000 metres	14:10.00	Women's 5000 metres	16:48.00
Men's 10,000 metres	29:50.00	Women's 10,000 metres	34:10.00
Men's marathon	2:20.00	Women's marathon	2:50:00
Men's 3000 steeplechase	8:55.00	Women's 3000 steeplechase	10:15.00
Men's 110 metres hurdles	13.80	Women's 100 metres hurdles	13.20
Men's 400 metres hurdles	50.70	Women's 400 metres hurdles	56.30
Men's high jump	2.22	Women's high jump	1.80
Men's pole vault	5.20	Women's pole vault	4.15
Men's long jump	7.90	Women's long jump	6.48
Men's triple jump	16.50	Women's triple jump	13.60
Men's shot put	18.50	Women's shot put	16.30
Men's discus throw	60.00	Women's discus throw	54.30
Men's hammer throw	68.00	Women's hammer throw	65.40
Men's javelin throw	76.00	Women's javelin throw	53.00
Men's decathlon	7300	Women's heptathlon	5570
Men's 20 kilometres walk	1:25.00	Women's 20 kilometres walk	1:37:00
Men's 50 kilometres walk	4:15.00	Women's 50 kilometres walk	4:55.00
