= Jamaica at the 2019 Pan American Games =

- IOC code: JAM
- NOC: Jamaica Olympic Association

in Lima, Peru 26 July–11 August 2019
- Competitors: 124 in 17 sports
- Flag bearer: Christopher Binnie (opening)
- Medals Ranked 13th: Gold 6 Silver 6 Bronze 7 Total 19

Pan American Games appearances (overview)
- 1951; 1955; 1959; 1963; 1967; 1971; 1975; 1979; 1983; 1987; 1991; 1995; 1999; 2003; 2007; 2011; 2015; 2019; 2023

Jamaica competed in the 2019 Pan American Games in Lima, Peru from July 26 to August 11, 2019.

The Jamaica Olympic Association's goal was to the send the most athletes, compete in the most sports and win the most medals at any one appearance by the country. The Jamaican team consisted of 124 athletes (69 men and 55 women) competing in 17 sports.

During the opening ceremony of the games, squash player Christopher Binnie carried the flag of the country as part of the parade of nations.

Jamaica finished the games with a record 19 medals won, surpassing the previous high of 14 won in 1959.

== Competitors ==
The following is the list of number of competitors (per gender) participating at the games per sport/discipline.

| Sport | Men | Women | Total |
|---|---|---|---|
| Athletics (track and field) | 22 | 28 | 50 |
| Badminton | 2 | 2 | 4 |
| Bodybuilding | 0 | 1 | 1 |
| Boxing | 2 | 0 | 2 |
| Canoeing | 1 | 0 | 1 |
| Cycling | 0 | 1 | 1 |
| Diving | 1 | 0 | 1 |
| Gymnastics | 2 | 3 | 5 |
| Football | 18 | 18 | 36 |
| Judo | 0 | 1 | 1 |
| Rugby sevens | 12 | 0 | 12 |
| Shooting | 2 | 0 | 2 |
| Squash | 3 | 0 | 3 |
| Swimming | 1 | 1 | 2 |
| Taekwondo | 1 | 0 | 1 |
| Tennis | 1 | 0 | 1 |
| Wrestling | 1 | 0 | 1 |
| Total | 69 | 55 | 124 |

== Medalists ==
The following competitors from Jamaica won medals at the games. In the by discipline sections below, medalists' names are bolded.

| Medal | Name | Sport | Event | Date |
|---|---|---|---|---|
| Gold | Fedrick Dacres | Athletics | Men's discus throw | August 6 |
| Gold | Elaine Thompson | Athletics | Women's 100 metres | August 7 |
| Gold | Natoya Goule | Athletics | Women's 800 metres | August 7 |
| Gold | Shericka Jackson | Athletics | Women's 400 metres | August 8 |
| Gold | Danniel Thomas-Dodd | Athletics | Women's shot put | August 9 |
| Gold | Shelly-Ann Fraser-Pryce | Athletics | Women's 200 metres | August 9 |
| Silver | Yona Knight-Wisdom | Diving | Men's 1 metre springboard | August 1 |
| Silver | Traves Smikle | Athletics | Men's discus throw | August 6 |
| Silver | Tajay Gayle | Athletics | Men's long jump | August 7 |
| Silver | Demish Gaye | Athletics | Men's 400 metres | August 8 |
| Silver | Aisha Praught-Leer | Athletics | Women's 1500 metres | August 9 |
| Silver | Shanieka Ricketts | Athletics | Women's triple jump | August 9 |
| Bronze | Ricardo Brown | Boxing | Men's +91 kg | July 30 |
| Bronze | Tissanna Hickling | Athletics | Women's long jump | August 6 |
| Bronze | Rushell Clayton | Athletics | Women's 400 metres hurdles | August 8 |
| Bronze | Megan Simmonds | Athletics | Women's 100 metres hurdles | August 8 |
| Bronze | Kemar Mowatt | Athletics | Men's 400 metres hurdles | August 8 |
| Bronze | Kimberly Williamson | Athletics | Women's high jump | August 8 |
| Bronze | Stephenie Ann McPherson; Tiffany James; Natoya Goule; Roneisha McGregor | Athletics | Women's 4 × 400 metres relay | August 10 |

**Medals by sport**
| **Sport** | 1st place, gold medalist(s) | 2nd place, silver medalist(s) | 3rd place, bronze medalist(s) | **Total** |
| Athletics | 6 | 5 | 6 | 17 |
| Diving | 0 | 1 | 0 | 1 |
| Boxing | 0 | 0 | 1 | 1 |
| **Total** | **6** | **6** | **7** | **19** |

Medals by gender
| **Day** | 1st place, gold medalist(s) | 2nd place, silver medalist(s) | 3rd place, bronze medalist(s) | **Total** |
| Women | 5 | 2 | 5 | 12 |
| Men | 1 | 4 | 2 | 7 |
| Total | 6 | 6 | 7 | 19 |

== Athletics (track and field) ==
Jamaica qualified 50 athletes in track and field (22 men and 28 women). The team was officially named on June 28, 2019, and originally consisted of 60 athletes.

Key

- Note–Ranks given for track events are for the entire round
- Q = Qualified for the next round
- q = Qualified for the next round as a fastest loser or, in field events, by position without achieving the qualifying target
- GR = Games record
- NR = National record
- PB = Personal best
- SB = Seasonal best
- DNS = Did not start

Men
Track events

| Athlete | Event | Semifinals | | Final | |
| Athlete | Event | Result | Rank | Result | Rank |
|---|---|---|---|---|---|
| Oshane Bailey | 100 m | 10.43 | 9 | Did not advance | |
| Rasheed Dwyer | 100 m | 10.32 | 5 Q | 10.32 | 5 |
| Andre Ewers | 200 m | 20.69 | 8 q | 20.91 | 8 |
| Julian Forte | 200 m | 21.18 | 12 | Did not advance | |
| Demish Gaye | 400 m | 45.47 | 5 Q | 44.94 | 2nd place, silver medalist(s) |
| Terry Thomas | 400 m | 46.97 | 13 | Did not advance | |
| Jauavney James | 800 m | 1:50.38 | 10 | Did not advance | |
| Orlando Bennett | 110 m hurdles | DSQ | | Did not advance | |
| Romel Lewis | 400 m hurdles | 50.87 | 11 | Did not advance | |
| Kemar Mowatt | 400 m hurdles | 49.84 | 4 Q | 49.09 | 3rd place, bronze medalist(s) |
| Andre Ewers; Rasheed Dwyer; Julian Forte; Oshane Bailey; Seno-Jay Givans; Romel Lewis; Jevaughn Minzie | 4 × 100 m relay | —N/a | | 39.01 | 5 |
| Rusheen McDonald; Romel Lewis; Terry Thomas; Javon Francis; Demish Gaye; Kemar Mowatt | 4 × 400 m relay | —N/a | | 3:06.83 | 6 |

- Athletes in italics did not compete

Field events

| Athlete | Event | Final | |
| Athlete | Event | Distance | Position |
|---|---|---|---|
| Tajay Gayle | Long jump | 8.17 | 2nd place, silver medalist(s) |
| Adrian Riley | Long jump | 7.57 | 8 |
| Clive Pullen | Triple jump | 16.35 | 5 |
| Jordan Scott | Triple jump | 16.13 | 9 |
| Ashinia Miller | Shot put | 19.17 | 8 |
| O'Dayne Richards | Shot put | 20.07 | 5 |
| Fedrick Dacres | Discus throw | 67.68 PR | 1st place, gold medalist(s) |
| Traves Smikle | Discus throw | 65.02 | 2nd place, silver medalist(s) |

Women
Track events

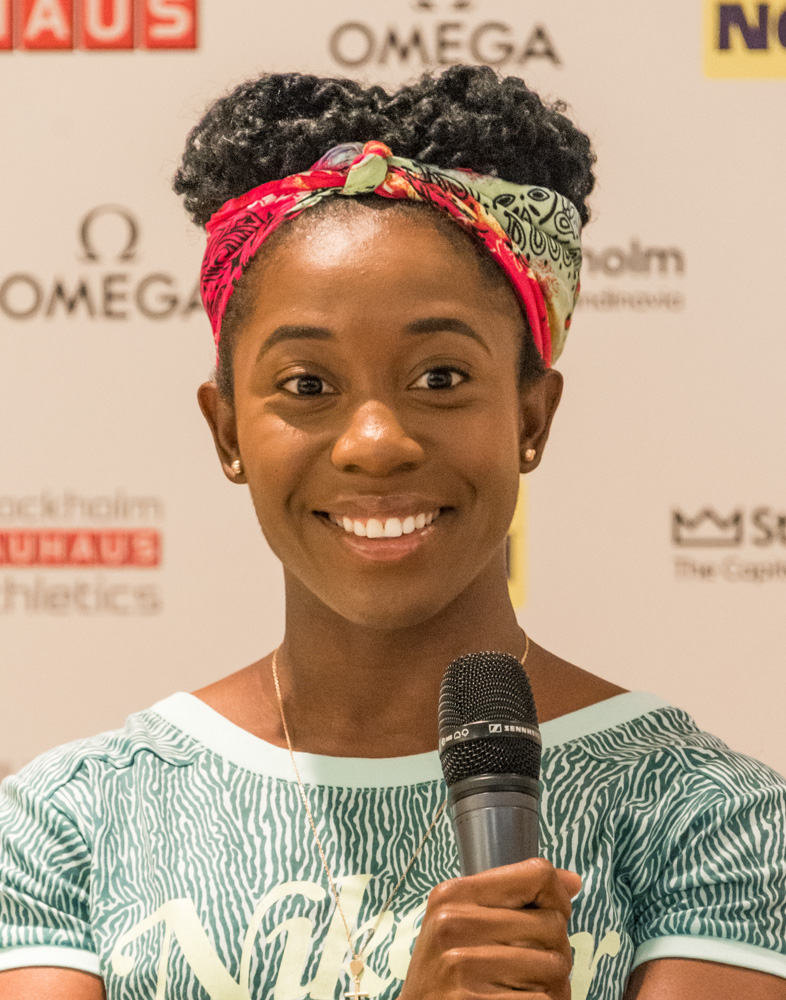
Shelly-Ann Fraser-Pryce won the 200 m gold in a Games Record

| Athlete | Event | Semifinals | | Final | |
| Athlete | Event | Result | Rank | Result | Rank |
|---|---|---|---|---|---|
| Natasha Morrison | 100 m | 11.59 | =7 | 11.40 | 6 |
| Elaine Thompson | 100 m | 11.36 | 1 Q | 11.18 | 1st place, gold medalist(s) |
| Schillonie Calvert | 200 m | 23.46 | 9 | Did not advance | |
| Shelly-Ann Fraser-Pryce | 200 m | 22.90 | 2 Q | 22.43 GR | 1st place, gold medalist(s) |
| Shericka Jackson | 400 m | 51.99 | 2 Q | 50.73 | 1st place, gold medalist(s) |
| Anastasia Le-Roy | 400 m | 54.18 | 14 | Did not advance | |
| Jazmine Fray | 800 m | 2:10.14 | 13 | Did not advance | |
| Natoya Goule | 800 m | 2:02.68 | 1 Q | 2:01.26 | 1st place, gold medalist(s) |
| Aisha Praught-Leer | 1500 m | —N/a | | 4:08.26 | 2nd place, silver medalist(s) |
| Megan Simmonds | 100 m hurdles | 13.10 | 7 Q | 13.01 | 3rd place, bronze medalist(s) |
| Yanique Thompson | 100 m hurdles | 12.90 | 3 Q | 13.11 | 4 |
| Rushell Clayton | 400 m hurdles | 55.93 | 2 Q | 55.53 | 3rd place, bronze medalist(s) |
| Ronda Whyte | 400 m hurdles | 56.47 | 6 Q | 57.42 | 8 |
| Schillonie Calvert; Natasha Morrison; Ronda Whyte; Shashalee Forbes; Shelly-Ann Fraser-Pryce; Roneisha McGregor; Stephenie Ann McPherson | 4 × 100 m relay | —N/a | | 43.74 | 5 |
| Stephenie Ann McPherson; Tiffany James; Natoya Goule; Roneisha McGregor; Shericka Jackson; Anastasia Le-Roy; Shiann Salmon | 4 × 400 m relay | —N/a | | 3:27.61 | 3rd place, bronze medalist(s) |

- Athletes in italics did not compete and did not receive a medal.

Field events

| Athlete | Event | Final | |
| Athlete | Event | Distance | Position |
|---|---|---|---|
| Sashane Hanson | High jump | DNS | |
| Kimberly Williamson | High jump | 1.84 | 3rd place, bronze medalist(s) |
| Tissanna Hickling | Long jump | 6.59 | 3rd place, bronze medalist(s) |
| Chanice Porter | Long jump | 6.44 | 7 |
| Shanieka Ricketts | Triple jump | 14.77 PB | 2nd place, silver medalist(s) |
| Kimberly Williams | Triple jump | 14.15 | 4 |
| Lloydricia Cameron | Shot put | 17.57 SB | 7 |
| Danniel Thomas-Dodd | Shot put | 19.55 GR, NR | 1st place, gold medalist(s) |
| Shadae Lawrence | Discus throw | 58.99 | 6 |
| Shanice Love | Discus throw | 59.82 | 5 |

== Badminton ==
Jamaica qualified a team of four badminton athletes (two per gender).

Singles

| Athlete | Event | Round of 64 | Round of 32 | Round of 16 | Quarterfinals | Semifinals | Final | Rank |
| Athlete | Event | Opposition Result | Opposition Result | Opposition Result | Opposition Result | Opposition Result | Opposition Result | Rank |
|---|---|---|---|---|---|---|---|---|
| Gareth Henry | Men's singles | Castellanos (GUA); L 0–2 (12–21, 5–21) | Did not advance | | | | | |
| Samuel Ricketts | Men's singles | Bye | Ramdhani (GUY); W 2–0 (21–13, 25–23) | Cordón (GUA); L 0–2 (15–21, 13–21) | Did not advance | | | |
| Tahlia Richardson | Women's singles | Bye | Williams (BAR); L 0–2 (19–21, 15–21) | Did not advance | | | | |
| Katherine Wynter | Women's singles | Yau (PAN); W 2–0 (21–4, 21–3) | Scott (BAR); W 2–0 (22–20, 21–11) | Wang (USA); L 0–2 (4–21, 6–21) | Did not advance | | | |

Doubles

| Athlete | Event | Round of 32 | Round of 16 | Quarterfinals | Semifinals | Final | Rank |
| Athlete | Event | Opposition Result | Opposition Result | Opposition Result | Opposition Result | Opposition Result | Rank |
|---|---|---|---|---|---|---|---|
| Gareth Henry; Samuel Ricketts | Men's doubles | —N/a | Bye | Guerrero / Martínez (CUB); L 0–2 (19–21, 9–21) | Did not advance | | |
| Tahlia Richardson; Katherine Wynter | Women's doubles | —N/a | Oropeza / Rodriguez (CUB); L 0–2 (13–21, 11–21) | Did not advance | | | |
| Gareth Henry; Katherine Wynter | Mixed doubles | Muñoz / Gaitan (MEX); L 0–2 (16–21, 13–21) | Did not advance | | | | |
| Samuel Ricketts; Tahlia Richardson | Mixed doubles | Pomoceno / Silva (BRA); L 0–2 (9–21, 17–21) | Did not advance | | | | |

== Bodybuilding ==
Jamaica qualified one female bodybuilder.

Women

| Athlete | Event | Prejudging | | Final | |
| Athlete | Event | Points | Rank | Points | Rank |
|---|---|---|---|---|---|
| Samantha Clarke | Bikini fitness | —N/a | | Did not advance | |

- No results were provided for the prejudging round, with only the top six advancing.

== Boxing ==
Jamaica qualified two male boxers.

Men

| Athlete | Event | Quarterfinals | Semifinals | Final | Rank |
| Athlete | Event | Opposition Result | Opposition Result | Opposition Result | Rank |
|---|---|---|---|---|---|
| Shiloh Defreitas | 60 kg | Cabrera (VEN); L 1–4 | Did not advance | | |
| Ricardo Brown | +91 kg | Rodríguez (NCA); W 3–2 | Salcedo (COL); L 0–5 | Did not advance | 3rd place, bronze medalist(s) |

== Canoeing ==
=== Sprint ===
Jamaica received one wild card in canoe sprint.

Men

| Athlete | Event | Heats | | Semifinal | | Final | |
| Athlete | Event | Time | Rank | Time | Rank | Time | Rank |
|---|---|---|---|---|---|---|---|
| Clive Greyson | K-1 200 metres | Did not start | | | | | |
| Clive Greyson | K-1 1000 metres | 5:44.595 | 8 | Did not advance | | | |

Position is within the heat

== Cycling ==
Jamaica qualified one woman cyclist.

=== Track ===
Women
Keirin

Key

- Note – Ranks given are within the heat
- QB – Qualified for Final B
- R – Qualified for the Repechage

| Athlete | Event | 1st round | Repechage | Final |
| Athlete | Event | Rank | Rank | Rank |
|---|---|---|---|---|
| Dahlia Palmer | Keirin | 3 R | 3 QB | 7 |

Sprint

| Athlete | Event | Qualification | | Round 1 | Repechage 1 | Quarterfinals | Semifinals | Final (5th-8th) | |
| Athlete | Event | Time Speed (km/h) | Rank | Opposition Time Speed (km/h) | Opposition Time Speed (km/h) | Opposition Time Speed (km/h) | Opposition Time Speed (km/h) | Opposition Time Speed (km/h) | Rank |
|---|---|---|---|---|---|---|---|---|---|
| Dahlia Palmer | Sprint | 11.884; 60.585 | 9 Q | Guerra (CUB); L | Rendon (COL); Lozano (ECU); L | Did not advance | | | |

== Diving ==
Jamaica qualified one male diver. Yona Knight-Wisdom's silver medal performance in the one metre springboard clinched Jamaica's first ever Pan American Games medal in the sport.

Men

| Athlete | Event | Preliminary | | Final | |
| Athlete | Event | Points | Rank | Points | Rank |
|---|---|---|---|---|---|
| Yona Knight-Wisdom | 1 m springboard | 378.20 | 1 Q | 429.90 | 2nd place, silver medalist(s) |
| Yona Knight-Wisdom | 3 m springboard | 405.95 | 5 Q | 437.65 | 5 |

== Football ==
Jamaica qualified a men's and women's team (of 18 athletes each, for a total of 36).

=== Men's tournament ===
Roster

The 18-man squad was announced on 21 July 2019. On 23 July defender Alwayne Harvey was replaced by Andre Leslie.

| No. | Pos. | Player | Date of birth (age) | Caps | Goals | Club |
|---|---|---|---|---|---|---|
| | GK | Jeadine White | 7 July 2000 (aged 19) | 2 | 0 | (Jamaica Football Federation) Humble Lions |
| | GK | Shamar Jemison | 20 April 1998 (aged 21) | 0 | 0 | Unattached |
| | DF | Javain Brown | 9 March 1999 (aged 20) | 4 | 0 | (United States Soccer Federation) University of South Florida Bulls |
| | DF | Andre Leslie | 5 February 1997 (aged 22) | 0 | 0 | (Jamaica Football Federation) Waterhouse |
| | DF | Ajeanie Talbott | 27 March 1998 (aged 21) | 2 | 0 | (Jamaica Football Federation) Harbour View |
| | DF | Ricardo Thomas | 30 August 1997 (aged 21) | 0 | 0 | (Jamaica Football Federation) Waterhouse |
| | DF | Clifton Woodbine | 7 July 1999 (aged 20) | 0 | 0 | (Jamaica Football Federation) Cavalier |
| | MF | Tevin Shaw | 24 February 1997 (aged 22) | 6 | 0 | (Jamaica Football Federation) Tivoli Gardens |
| | MF | Luca Levee | 21 February 1997 (aged 22) | 0 | 0 | (Jamaica Football Federation) Harbour View |
| | MF | Lamar Walker | 5 December 1999 (aged 19) | 0 | 0 | (Jamaica Football Federation) Portmore United |
| | MF | Kaheem Parris | 6 January 2000 (aged 19) | 3 | 0 | (Jamaica Football Federation) Cavalier |
| | MF | Deshane Beckford | 18 March 1998 (aged 21) | 0 | 0 | (Jamaica Football Federation) Montego Bay United |
| | MF | Tyreek Magee | 27 October 1999 (aged 19) | 2 | 0 | Unattached |
| | MF | Leonardo Jibbison | 14 January 1999 (aged 20) | 0 | 0 | (Jamaica Football Federation) Humble Lions |
| | MF | Venton Evans | 19 June 1998 (aged 21) | 0 | 0 | (Jamaica Football Federation) Portmore United |
| | FW | Alex Marshall | 24 February 1998 (aged 21) | 8 | 0 | (Jamaica Football Federation) Cavalier |
| | FW | Daniel Green | 10 June 1997 (aged 22) | 0 | 0 | (Jamaica Football Federation) Mount Pleasant |
| | FW | Jourdaine Fletcher | 23 September 1997 (aged 21) | 2 | 0 | (Jamaica Football Federation) Mount Pleasant |

Group B

| Pos | Team | Pld | W | D | L | GF | GA | GD | Pts | Qualification |
|---|---|---|---|---|---|---|---|---|---|---|
| 1 | Uruguay | 3 | 3 | 0 | 0 | 7 | 0 | +7 | 9 | Knockout stage |
| 2 | Honduras | 3 | 1 | 1 | 1 | 5 | 6 | −1 | 4 | Knockout stage |
| 3 | Jamaica | 3 | 1 | 0 | 2 | 3 | 5 | −2 | 3 | Fifth place match |
| 4 | Peru (H) | 3 | 0 | 1 | 2 | 2 | 6 | −4 | 1 | Seventh place match |

Source: Lima 2019
Rules for classification: Tie-breakers
(H) Hosts
29 July 2019
17:30

| Jamaica | 1–3 | Honduras |
|---|---|---|
| Beckford 46' | Report | Vuelto 71', 80'; Martínez 78' |

Estadio Universidad San Marcos
Referee: Fernando Echenique (Argentina)

1 August 2019
17:30

| Jamaica | 0–2 | Uruguay |
|---|---|---|
| | Report | Fernández 61', 72' |

Estadio Universidad San Marcos
Referee: Wagner Magalhães (Brazil)

4 August 2019
20:30

| Jamaica | 2–0 | Peru |
|---|---|---|
| Beckford 55', 60' | Report |

Estadio Universidad San Marcos
Referee: Fernando Echenique (Argentina)

Fifth place match

7 August 2019
13:00

| Panama | 4–0 | Jamaica |
|---|---|---|
| Aguilar 3'; Carrasquilla 11'; Ayarza 28'; Zúñiga 58' | Report |

Estadio Universidad San Marcos
Referee: Miguel Santibañez (Peru)

=== Women's tournament ===
Roster

The following 18 players were named to the roster for the 2019 Pan American Games. Konya Plummer was injured and replaced by Trudi Carter. Carter was then replaced by Lauren Silver due to injury.

| No. | Pos. | Player | Date of birth (age) | Caps | Goals | Club |
|---|---|---|---|---|---|---|
| 1 | GK | Sydney Schneider | 31 August 1999 (aged 19) | 11 | 0 | (United States Soccer Federation) UNC Wilmington Seahawks |
| 13 | GK | Yazmeen Jamieson | 17 March 1998 (aged 21) | 3 | 0 | (New Zealand Football) Papakura City FC |
| 14 | DF | Den-Den Blackwood | 7 March 1997 (aged 22) | 15 | 3 | Unattached |
| 17 | DF | Toriana Patterson | 2 February 1994 (aged 25) | 10 | 0 | (Italian Football Federation) Pink Sport Time |
| 15 | DF | Jadyn Matthews | 16 November 1999 (aged 19) | 7 | 0 | (United States Soccer Federation) Cornell Big Red |
| 3 | DF | Chanel Hudson-Marks | 14 September 1997 (aged 21) | 4 | 0 | Unattached |
| 8 | DF | Chyanne Dennis | 9 April 1999 (aged 20) | 3 | 0 | (United States Soccer Federation) South Florida Bulls |
| 2 | DF | Jayda Hylton-Pelaia | 30 May 1998 (aged 21) | | | (United States Soccer Federation) East Carolina Pirates |
| 5 | DF | Rachelle Smith | 18 September 1996 (aged 22) | | | Unattached |
| 16 | DF | Madiya Harriott | 16 February 1999 (aged 20) | 0 | 0 | (United States Soccer Federation) Vanderbilt Commodores |
| 18 | MF | Lauren Silver | 22 March 1993 (aged 26) | | | (Norwegian Football Federation) SK Trondheims-Ørn |
| 12 | MF | Sashana Campbell | 2 March 1991 (aged 28) | 24 | 3 | (Israel Football Association) Maccabi Kishronot Hadera |
| 4 | MF | Chantelle Swaby | 6 August 1998 (aged 20) | 11 | 0 | (United States Soccer Federation) Rutgers Scarlet Knights |
| 7 | MF | Tarania Clarke | 3 October 1999 (aged 19) | | | (Jamaica Football Federation) Waterhouse |
| 10 | FW | Jody Brown | 16 April 2002 (aged 17) | 14 | 8 | (United States Soccer Federation) Montverde Academy |
| 9 | FW | Olufolasade Adamolekun | 21 February 2001 (aged 18) | 3 | 0 | (United States Soccer Federation) USC Trojans |
| 6 | FW | Mireya Grey | 7 September 1998 (aged 20) | 3 | 0 | (United States Soccer Federation) Washington Huskies |
| 11 | FW | Shayla Smart | 30 May 2000 (aged 19) | | | (United States Soccer Federation) Wake Forest Demon Deacons |

Group A

| Pos | Team | Pld | W | D | L | GF | GA | GD | Pts | Qualification |
|---|---|---|---|---|---|---|---|---|---|---|
| 1 | Paraguay | 3 | 2 | 1 | 0 | 5 | 2 | +3 | 7 | Knockout stage |
| 2 | Colombia | 3 | 1 | 2 | 0 | 4 | 2 | +2 | 5 | Knockout stage |
| 3 | Mexico | 3 | 1 | 1 | 1 | 5 | 4 | +1 | 4 | Fifth place match |
| 4 | Jamaica | 3 | 0 | 0 | 3 | 1 | 7 | −6 | 0 | Seventh place match |

Source: Lima 2019
Rules for classification: Tie-breakers
28 July 2019
10:00

| Mexico | 2–0 | Jamaica |
|---|---|---|
| Palacios 39'; Corral 58' | Report |

Estadio Universidad San Marcos
Referee: Elizabeth Tintaya (Peru)

31 July 2019
13:00

| Jamaica | 0–2 | Colombia |
|---|---|---|
| | Report | Santos 58', 85' |

Estadio Universidad San Marcos
Referee: Milagros Arruela (Peru)

3 August 2019
13:00

| Paraguay | 3–1 | Jamaica |
|---|---|---|
| J. Martínez 4', 63'; Quintana 90+1' | Report | Hudson-Marks 31' |

Estadio Universidad San Marcos
Referee: Elizabeth Tintaya (Peru)

Seventh place match

6 August 2019
10:00

| Jamaica | 1–0 | Peru |
|---|---|---|
| Grey 26' | Report |

Estadio Universidad San Marcos
Referee: Adriana Farfán (Bolivia)

== Gymnastics ==
=== Artistic ===
Jamaica qualified a team of five artistic gymnasts (two men and three women). This will mark Jamaica's debut in the sport at the Pan American Games.

Men

| Athlete | Event | Qualification | | | | | | Total | Rank | Final | | | | | | Total | Rank |
| Athlete | Event | F | PH | R | V | PB | HB | Total | Rank | F | PH | R | V | PB | HB | Total | Rank |
|---|---|---|---|---|---|---|---|---|---|---|---|---|---|---|---|---|---|
| Reiss Beckford | Individual all-around | 13.600 | 12.050 | 12.950 | 13.600 | 13.150 | 12.600 | 77.950 | 13 Q | 11.700 | 10.650 | 13.300 | 13.800 | 13.200 | 9.900 | 72.550 | 22 |
| Caleb Faulk | Individual all-around | 11.450 | 11.050 | 12.900 | 12.900 | 11.100 | 11.550 | 70.950 | 31 | Did not advance | | | | | | | |

Women
Team & Individual Qualification

| Athlete | Event | Apparatus | | | | Total | Rank |
| Athlete | Event | V | UB | BB | F | Total | Rank |
|---|---|---|---|---|---|---|---|
| Danusia Francis | Team | 13.350 | 12.875 | 12.950 Q | 12.800 | 51.975Q | 8 |
| Kiara Richmon | Team | 12.600 | 11.400 | 9.950 | 10.650 | 44.600 | 33 |
| Toni-Ann Williams | Team | | 10.800 | 11.350 | | 22.150 | 52 |
| Total | Team | 25.950 | 35.075 | 34.250 | 23.450 | 118.725 | 10 |

Individual finals

| Athlete | Event | Apparatus | | | | Total | Rank |
| Athlete | Event | V | UB | BB | F | Total | Rank |
|---|---|---|---|---|---|---|---|
| Danusia Francis | All-around | 13.500 | 12.750 | 12.750 | 12.650 | 51.650 | 7 |
| Danusia Francis | Balance beam | —N/a | | 11.733 | —N/a | 11.733 | 7 |

== Judo ==
Jamaica qualified one female judoka.

Women

| Athlete | Event | Preliminaries | Quarterfinals | Semifinals | Repechage | Final / BM | |
| Athlete | Event | Opposition Result | Opposition Result | Opposition Result | Opposition Result | Opposition Result | Rank |
|---|---|---|---|---|---|---|---|
| Ebony Drysdale Daley | 70 kg | Villarreal (MEX); W 10–00S3 | Pérez (PUR); L 00–10 | Did not advance | Santana (BRA); W 10S1–00 | Cortés (CUB); L 00S3–10S1 | =5 |

== Rugby sevens ==
Jamaica qualified a men's team of 12 athletes, by winning the 2018 RAN Sevens. This will mark the country's debut in the sport at the Pan American Games.

=== Men's tournament ===
Pool stage

| Pos | Team | Pld | W | D | L | PF | PA | PD | Pts | Qualification |
|---|---|---|---|---|---|---|---|---|---|---|
| 1 | Argentina | 3 | 3 | 0 | 0 | 96 | 7 | +89 | 9 | Semifinals |
| 2 | Canada | 3 | 2 | 0 | 1 | 69 | 12 | +57 | 7 | Semifinals |
| 3 | Jamaica | 3 | 1 | 0 | 2 | 14 | 93 | −79 | 5 | 5–8th place semifinals |
| 4 | Uruguay | 3 | 0 | 0 | 3 | 10 | 77 | −67 | 3 | 5–8th place semifinals |

Source: Lima 2019
Rules for classification: 1) Points; 2) Head-to-head result; 3) Point difference; 4) Points scored; 5) draw.

26 July 2019
12:45

| Argentina | 52–0 | Jamaica |
| Try: Schulz 1'c Luna (2) 3'm, 4'; Del Mestre 6'c Osadczuk 7'm Ulloa (2) 8'c, 11'c Vanni 14'c Con: Mare (3/4) 1', 5', 7'; Ulloa (3/4) 9', 11', 14' | Report |

Villa María del Triunfo Sports Center
Referee: Francisco Gonzalez (Uruguay)

27 July 2019
12:40

| Canada | 31–0 | Jamaica |
| Try: Morra 0'c Coats 3'm Duke 5'c Zaruba (2) 8'c, 11'm Con: Coats (3/4) 1', 5', 8'; Kay (0/1) | Report |

Villa María del Triunfo Sports Center
Referee: Cisco Lopez (United States)

27 July 2019
16:30

| Uruguay | 10–14 | Jamaica |
| Try: Passadore 7'm McCubbin 12'm Con: Pastore (0/1); Brazionis (0/1) | Report | Try: Caton-Brown 1'c Osborne 3'c Con: Adamson (2/2) 2', 3' |

Villa María del Triunfo Sports Center
Referee: Dale Hall (Canada)

5th–8th place classification

28 July 2019
10:25

| Jamaica | 33–19 | Guyana |
| Try: Caton-Brown 2'c Caven 3'c Facey (2) 4'c, 8'c Osborne 10'm Con: Adamson (4/5) 2', 3', 4', 8' | Report | Try: King (2) 11'c, 14'c Schroeder 12'm Con: Broomes (2/3) 11', 14' |

Villa María del Triunfo Sports Center
Referee: Cisco Lopez (United States)

Fifth place match

28 July 2019
14:15

| Chile | 50–12 | Jamaica |
| Try: Brangier 2'c Sigren 4'm Blanc 5'm Silva (2) 7'c, 14'c Penalty try 7'; Tredinick 9'm Fe. Neira 10'c Con: Fernández (2/5) 3', 7'; Tredinick (2/2) 11', 14' | Report | Try: Dixon 6'c Smith 12'm Con: Adamson (1/2) 6' |

Villa María del Triunfo Sports Center
Referee: Francisco Gonzalez (Uruguay)

== Shooting ==
Jamaica received two reallocated spots in men's shotgun.

Men

| Athlete | Event | Qualification | | Final | |
| Athlete | Event | Points | Rank | Points | Rank |
|---|---|---|---|---|---|
| Shaun Barnes | Skeet | 87 | 28 | Did not advance | |
| Christian Sasso | Skeet | 103 | 25 | Did not advance | |

== Squash ==
Jamaica qualified a men's team of three athletes, marking its return to the sport at the Pan American Games for the first time since 2011. As Jamaica's top ranked player Christopher Binnie qualified for the team automatically. The other two qualified after being the top two ranked during a trials.

Men
Singles and Doubles

| Athlete | Event | Round of 32 | Round of 16 | Quarterfinals | Semifinals | Final | |
| Athlete | Event | Opposition Result | Opposition Result | Opposition Result | Opposition Result | Opposition Result | Rank |
|---|---|---|---|---|---|---|---|
| Christopher Binnie | Singles | Bye | Camiruaga (CHI); L WD | Did not advance | | | |
| Bruce Burrowes | Singles | Pinto (CHI); L 1–3 | Did not advance | | | | |
| Christopher Binnie; Lewis Walters | Doubles | —N/a | Enríquez (GUA); Enríquez (GUA); W 2–1 | Salazar (MEX); Salazar (MEX); L 0–2 | Did not advance | | |

- Due to an injury sustained five weeks before the games, Christopher Binnie withdrew from the men's singles to focus on the other two events.

Team

| Athlete | Event | Group stage | | | Round of 16 | 9 to 12 round | 9th place match | |
| Athlete | Event | Opposition Result | Opposition Result | Rank | Opposition Result | Opposition Result | Opposition Result | Rank |
|---|---|---|---|---|---|---|---|---|
| Christopher Binnie; Bruce Burrowes; Lewis Walters | Team | United States; L 0–3 | Chile; W 2–1 | 2 Q | Guatemala; L 1–2 | El Salvador; W 2–0 | Chile; W 2–0 | 9 |

== Swimming ==
Jamaica qualified two swimmers (one man and one woman).

Key

- Note – Ranks given are for the entire round
- QB – Qualified for the B final

| Athlete | Event | Heat | | Final | |
| Athlete | Event | Time | Rank | Time | Rank |
|---|---|---|---|---|---|
| Michael Gunning | Men's 200 m freestyle | 1:52.55 | 13 QB | 1:52.10 | 10 |
| Michael Gunning | Men's 200 m butterfly | 2:02.73 | 14 QB | 2:01.68 | 12 |
| Michael Gunning | Men's 200 m individual medley | 2:08.52 | 20 | Did not advance | |
| Emily MacDonald | Women's 50 m freestyle | 26.90 | =18 | Did not advance | |
| Emily MacDonald | Women's 100 m freestyle | 58.19 | 15 QB | 58.07 | 15 |
| Emily MacDonald | Women's 100 m butterfly | 1:04.74 | 19 | Did not advance | |

== Taekwondo ==
Jamaica received one wildcard in the men's 68 kg event.

Kyorugi
Men

| Athlete | Event | Round of 16 | Quarterfinals | Semifinals | Repechage | Final / BM | Rank |
| Athlete | Event | Opposition Result | Opposition Result | Opposition Result | Opposition Result | Opposition Result | Rank |
|---|---|---|---|---|---|---|---|
| Brandon Sealy | -68 kg | Nickolas (USA); L 18–25 | Did not advance | | | | |

== Tennis ==
Jamaica received one wildcard to enter a male singles competitor.

Men

| Athlete | Event | First round | Round of 32 | Round of 16 | Quarterfinals | Semifinals | Final / BM | |
| Athlete | Event | Opposition Score | Opposition Score | Opposition Score | Opposition Score | Opposition Score | Opposition Score | Rank |
|---|---|---|---|---|---|---|---|---|
| Rowland Phillips | Singles | Cerúndolo (ARG); L 3–6, 1–6 | Did not advance | | | | | |

== Wrestling ==
Jamaica received one wild card in the men's freestyle discipline.

Men's freestyle

| Athlete | Event | Preliminaries | Quarterfinals | Semifinals | Repechage | Final / BM | Rank |
| Athlete | Event | Opposition Result | Opposition Result | Opposition Result | Opposition Result | Opposition Result | Rank |
|---|---|---|---|---|---|---|---|
| Angus Arthur | 86 kg | Bye | Downey (USA); L 4–14 | Did not advance | | | |

== Non-competing sports ==
=== Karate ===
Jamaica qualified one female karateka in the kumite discipline, marking the country's scheduled debut in the sport at the Pan American Games. However, Jessica Cargill did not compete or appear in the entry list.

== See also ==
- Jamaica at the 2020 Summer Olympics
