= 2018 NACAC Championships =

III NACAC Championships
- Dates: August 10–12, 2018
- Host city: Toronto, Canada
- Venue: Varsity Stadium
- Level: Senior
- Events: 42
- Participation: 319 athletes from 29 nations

The 2018 North American, Central American and Caribbean Championships was a regional track and field competition held at Varsity Stadium in Toronto, Canada, from August 10–12, 2018. It was the third edition of a senior track and field championship for the NACAC region, held three years after the 2015 NACAC Championships. The winner of each event qualified (granted their country would ultimately pick them) for the 2019 Pan American Games competition, which was held in Lima, Peru.

== Medal summary ==
=== Men ===
Event	Gold		Silver		Bronze	
100 metres (wind: +0.4 m/s)	Tyquendo Tracey; Jamaica	10.03 CR	Kendal Williams; United States	10.11	Cameron Burrell; United States	10.12
200 metres (wind: +1.7 m/s)	Kyle Greaux; Trinidad and Tobago	20.11 CR	Aaron Brown; Canada	20.20	Nigel Ellis; Jamaica	20.57
400 metres	Demish Gaye; Jamaica	45.47	Nery Brenes; Costa Rica	45.67	Fitzroy Dunkley; Jamaica	45.76
800 metres	Brandon McBride; Canada	1:46.14	Marco Arop; Canada	1:46.82	Wesley Vázquez; Puerto Rico	1:47.63
1500 metres	Izaic Yorks; United States	3:51.85	Patrick Casey; United States	3:51.87	Charles Philibert-Thiboutot; Canada	3:52.60
5000 metres	Hassan Mead; United States	14:00.18	Riley Masters; United States	14:01.04	Justyn Knight; Canada	14:01.77
10,000 metres	Lopez Lomong; United States	29:49.03 CR	Elkanah Kibet; United States	29:51.37	Reed Fischer; United States	29:53.63
110 metres hurdles (wind: +0.4 m/s)	Hansle Parchment; Jamaica	13.28	Aleec Harris; United States	13.49	Shane Brathwaite; Barbados	13.52
400 metres hurdles	Kyron McMaster; British Virgin Islands	48.18 CR	Annsert Whyte; Jamaica	48.91	Khallifah Rosser; United States	49.13
3000 metres steeplechase	Andy Bayer; United States	8:28.55 CR	Travis Mahoney; United States	8:29.29	Jordan Mann; United States	8:45.14
4 × 100 metres relay	Canada; Bismark Boateng; Jerome Blake; Mobolade Ajomale; Aaron Brown	38.57	Barbados; Shane Brathwaite; Mario Burke; Burkheart Ellis Jr; Jaquone Hoyte	38.69	Trinidad and Tobago; Nathan Farinha; Jonathan Farinha; Jalen Purcell; Kyle Greaux	38.89
4 × 400 metres relay	United States; Nathan Strother; Obi Igbokwe; Michael Cherry; Kahmari Montgomery	3:00.60	Bahamas; O'Jay Ferguson; Teray Smith; Michael Mathieu; Alonzo Russell	3:03.80	Cuba; Leandro Zamora; Adrián Chacón; Rubén Caballero; Yoandys Lescay	3:04.11
20,000 metres walk	Evan Dunfee; Canada	1:25:39 CR	Nick Christie; United States	1:30:11	John Cody Risch; United States	1:36:05
High jump	Jeron Robinson; United States	2.28 m CR	Michael Mason; Canada	2.28 m	Donald Thomas; Bahamas; Django Lovett; Canada	2.28 m
Pole vault	Scott Houston; United States	5.45 m CR	Shawnacy Barber; Canada	5.40 m	Not Awarded	
Long jump	Marquis Dendy; United States	8.29 m CR	Tajay Gayle; Jamaica	8.24 m	Ramone Bailey; Jamaica	8.09 m
Triple jump	Jordan Díaz; Cuba	16.83 m	Chris Benard; United States	16.73 m	KeAndre Bates; United States	16.65 m
Shot put	Darrell Hill; United States	21.68 m CR	Tim Nedow; Canada	21.02 m	O'Dayne Richards; Jamaica	20.89 m
Discus throw	Fedrick Dacres; Jamaica	68.47 m CR	Traves Smikle; Jamaica	65.46 m	Reggie Jagers; United States	62.70 m
Hammer throw	Roberto Sawyers; Costa Rica	72.94 m CR	Alex Young; United States	72.75 m	Adam Keenan; Canada	72.72 m
Javelin throw	Anderson Peters; Grenada	79.65 m CR	Curtis Thompson; United States	76.02 m	Markim Felix; Grenada	75.14 m

- Only three competitors were in the men's pole vault, with the third placed athlete not registering a height. This meant a bronze medal was not awarded.

=== Women ===
Event	Gold		Silver		Bronze	
100 metres (wind: +0.9 m/s)	Jenna Prandini; United States	10.96 CR	Jonielle Smith; Jamaica	11.07	Crystal Emmanuel; Canada	11.11
200 metres (wind: -0.3 m/s)	Shericka Jackson; Jamaica	22.64	Crystal Emmanuel; Canada	22.67	Phyllis Francis; United States	22.91
400 metres	Stephenie Ann McPherson; Jamaica	51.15	Aiyanna Stiverne; Canada	52.00	Brionna Thomas; United States	52.19
800 metres	Ajeé Wilson; United States	1:57.52 CR	Natoya Goule; Jamaica	1:57.95	Rosemary Almanza; Cuba	2:00.15
1500 metres	Kate Grace; United States	4:06.23 CR	Shannon Osika; United States	4:06.92	Gabriela Stafford; Canada	4:07.36
5000 metres	Rachel Schneider; United States	15:26.19 CR	Lauren Paquette; United States	15:39.40	Kate Van Buskirk; Canada	15:50.35
10,000 metres	Marielle Hall; United States	33:27.19	Rochelle Kanuho; United States	33:28.33	Rachel Cliff; Canada	33:30.16
100 metres hurdles (wind: 0.0 m/s)	Kendra Harrison; United States	12.55 CR	Danielle Williams; Jamaica	12.61	Andrea Vargas; Costa Rica	12.91
400 metres hurdles	Shamier Little; United States	53.32 CR	Janieve Russell; Jamaica	53.81	Georganne Moline; United States	54.26
3000 metres steeplechase	Mel Lawrence; United States	9:45.36 CR	Emily Oren; United States	9:56.66	Megan Rolland; United States	9:59.85
4 × 100 metres relay	United States; Kiara Parker; Shania Collins; Dezerea Bryant; Jenna Prandini	42.50	Jamaica; Shelly-Ann Fraser-Pryce; Jura Levy; Jonielle Smith; Shericka Jackson	43.33	Canada; Shaina Harrison; Crystal Emmanuel; Phylicia George; Jellisa Westney	43.50
4 × 400 metres relay	United States; Briana Guillory; Jasmine Blocker; Kiana Horton; Courtney Okolo	3:26.08	Jamaica; Stephenie Ann McPherson; Tiffany James; Anastasia Le-Roy; Christine Day	3:27.25	Canada; Micha Powell; Aiyanna Stiverne; Travia Jones; Alicia Brown	3:28.04
20,000 metres walk	Maria Michta-Coffey; United States	1:36:34 CR	Mirna Ortiz; Guatemala	1:38:36	Katie Burnett; United States	1:39:31
High jump	Levern Spencer; Saint Lucia	1.91 m CR	Elizabeth Patterson; United States	1.88 m	Loretta Blaut; United States	1.82 m
Pole vault	Katie Nageotte; United States	4.75 m CR	Yarisley Silva; Cuba	4.70 m	Sandi Morris; United States	4.65 m
Long jump	Sha'Keela Saunders; United States	6.60 m	Quanesha Burks; United States	6.59 m	Tissanna Hickling; Jamaica	6.38 m
Triple jump	Shanieka Ricketts; Jamaica	14.25 m CR	Tori Franklin; United States	14.09 m	Thea LaFond; Dominica	13.74 m
Shot put	Maggie Ewen; United States	18.22 m	Cleopatra Borel; Trinidad and Tobago	17.83 m	Jessica Ramsey; United States	17.80 m
Discus throw	Yaime Pérez; Cuba	61.97 m CR	Valarie Allman; United States	59.67 m	Maggie Ewen; United States	59.00 m
Hammer throw	DeAnna Price; United States	74.60 m CR	Jillian Weir; Canada	71.96 m	Brooke Andersen; United States	70.05 m
Javelin throw	Ariana Ince; United States	59.59 m	Bethany Drake; United States	54.07 m	Coralys Ortiz; Puerto Rico	53.11 m

== Medal table ==
Rank	Nation	Gold	Silver	Bronze	Total
1	United States (USA)	25	19	17	61
2	Jamaica (JAM)	7	10	5	22
3	Canada (CAN)*	3	8	10	21
4	Cuba (CUB)	2	1	1	4
5	Costa Rica (CRC)	1	1	1	3
5	Trinidad and Tobago (TRI)	1	1	1	3
7	Grenada (GRN)	1	0	1	2
8	British Virgin Islands (IVB)	1	0	0	1
8	Saint Lucia (LCA)	1	0	0	1
10	Barbados (BAR)	0	1	1	2
11	Guatemala (GUA)	0	1	0	1
12	Bahamas (BAH)	0	0	2	2
12	Puerto Rico (PUR)	0	0	2	2
14	Dominica (DMA)	0	0	1	1
Totals (14 entries)		42	42	42	126

== Participating nations ==
According to an unofficial count, 319 athletes from 29 countries participated.

- Anguilla (1)
- Antigua and Barbuda (1)
- Aruba (1)
- Bahamas (13)
- Barbados (14)
- Bermuda (4)
- British Virgin Islands (10)
- Canada (48)
- Cayman Islands (1)
- Costa Rica (5)
- Cuba (14)
- Dominica (2)
- Dominican Republic (3)
- Grenada (3)
- Guatemala (1)
- Haiti (9)
- Honduras (2)
- Jamaica (40)
- Mexico (4)
- Montserrat (2)
- Puerto Rico (6)
- Saint Kitts and Nevis (5)
- Saint Lucia (1)
- Saint Vincent and the Grenadines (7)
- El Salvador (2)
- Trinidad and Tobago (19)
- Turks and Caicos Islands (6)
- United States (94)
- United States Virgin Islands (1)

== Schedule ==
August 10
EST Time	Event
10:05 a.m.	Women's long jump Qualification
10:20 a.m.	Women's 100m Qualification
10:34 a.m.	Men's 100m Qualification
10:50 a.m.	Women's 400m Semi-Finals
11:00 a.m.	Men's and Women's 20 km RW Final (Off-site)
11:17 a.m.	Men's 400m Semi-Finals
11:40 a.m.	Men's long jump qualification
11:50 a.m.	Women's 100mH Qualification
12:07 p.m.	Men's 110mH Qualification
12:30 p.m.	Women's 200m Qualification
12:46 p.m.	Men's 200m Qualification
6:00 p.m.	Women's Hammer Final
6:30 p.m.	Women's 400mH Semi-Finals
6:55 p.m.	Men's 400mH Semi-Finals
7:00 p.m.	Men's Triple jump Final
7:20 p.m.	Women's 800m Semi-Finals
7:30 p.m.	Men's Shot Final
7:35 p.m.	Men's 800m Semi-Finals
7:45 p.m.	Women's Discus Final
7:50 p.m.	Women's 3000m Steeplechase Final
8:00 p.m.	Women's High jump Final
8:10 p.m.	Women's 100mH Semi-Finals
8:30 p.m.	Men's 110mH Semi-Finals
8:50 p.m.	Women's 200m Semi-Finals
9:10 p.m.	Men's 200m Semi-Finals
9:30 p.m.	Women's 5000m Final
9:55 p.m.	Men's 10000m Final
August 11
3:30 p.m.	Men's Hammer Final
3:30 p.m.	Men's High jump Final
3:55 p.m.	Women's 100m Semi-Finals
4:00 p.m.	Women's Long jump Final
4:13 p.m.	Men's 100m Semi-Finals
4:35 p.m.	Women's 800m Final
4:45 p.m.	Men's 800m Final
5:00 p.m.	Women's Pole vault Final
5:00 p.m.	Men's Javelin Final
5:00 p.m.	Women's 100mH Final
5:10 p.m.	Men's 110mH Final
5:20 p.m.	Women's 400m Final
5:30 p.m.	Men's 400m Final
5:40 p.m.	Women's 100m Final
5:50 p.m.	Men's 100m Final
6:00 p.m.	Men's 5000m Final
6:25 p.m.	Women's 10000m Final
August 12
1:00 p.m.	Men's Discus Final
1:00 p.m.	Men's Long jump Final
2:00 p.m.	Men's Pole vault Final
2:00 p.m.	Women's Shot Final
2:00 p.m.	Women's 400mH Final
2:10 p.m.	Men's 400mH Final
2:20 p.m.	Women's 200m Final
2:30 p.m.	Men's 200m Final
2:40 p.m.	Men's 3000m Steeplechase Final
3:00 p.m.	Women's Javelin Final
3:00 p.m.	Women's Triple jump Final
3:10 p.m.	Women's 1500m Final
3:25 p.m.	Men's 1500m Final
3:40 p.m.	Women's 4 × 400 m Final
3:55 p.m.	Men's 4 × 400 m Final
4:10 p.m.	Women's 4 × 100 m Final
4:30 p.m.	Men's 4 × 100 m Final

== See also ==
- Athletics at the 2019 Pan American Games – Qualification
