= Athletics at the 2019 Pan American Games =

- Athletics pictogram
- Venues: Athletics Stadium; Parque Kennedy
- Dates: July 27 – August 11, 2019
- Competitors: 678 from 40 nations

Athletics competitions at the 2019 Pan American Games in Lima, Peru were held between July 27 and August 11, 2019 at the Athletics Stadium in the Villa Deportiva Nacional Videna cluster, with the marathon and walks being held at Kennedy Park.

A total of 48 events were contested, equally divided among men and women. The women's 50 km walk was added for this edition of the Games, marking the first time that men and women competed in an equal number of events.

== Qualification ==
Up to a total of 740 athletes were qualified to compete. Each nation may enter a maximum of two athletes in each individual event, and one team per relay event. Each event has a maximum number of competitors and a minimum performance standard. Peru as host nation, is granted an automatic athlete slot per event, in the event no one qualifies for that respective event.

== Competition schedule ==
The competition schedule for athletics at the 2019 Pan American Games is announced.

== Participating nations ==
A total of 40 nations entered athletes, with Suriname being the only country that did not register any in the sport, as their only athlete was injured. The number of athletes a nation has entered is in parentheses beside the name of the country.

- Antigua and Barbuda (2)
- Argentina (22)
- Aruba (1)
- Bahamas (24)
- Barbados (10)
- Belize (1)
- Bermuda (2)
- Bolivia (5)
- Brazil (47)
- British Virgin Islands (4)
- Canada (47)
- Cayman Islands (1)
- Chile (28)
- Colombia (44)
- Costa Rica (8)
- Cuba (44)
- Dominica (2)
- Dominican Republic (12)
- Ecuador (31)
- El Salvador (2)
- Grenada (8)
- Guatemala (10)
- Guyana (5)
- Haiti (3)
- Honduras (1)
- Jamaica (55)
- Mexico (31)
- Nicaragua (1)
- Panama (8)
- Paraguay (3)
- Peru (39)
- Puerto Rico (17)
- Saint Kitts and Nevis (4)
- Saint Lucia (4)
- Saint Vincent and the Grenadines (1)
- Trinidad and Tobago (26)
- United States (92)
- Uruguay (7)
- Venezuela (27)
- Virgin Islands (2)

== Medal summary ==
=== Medal table ===
* Host nation (Peru)

Rank	Nation	Gold	Silver	Bronze	Total
1	United States	7	14	12	33
2	Brazil	6	7	2	15
3	Jamaica	6	5	6	17
4	Canada	5	6	4	15
5	Cuba	5	2	3	10
6	Ecuador	4	0	2	6
7	Mexico	3	4	3	10
8	Colombia	3	1	3	7
9	Peru*	2	1	1	4
10	Chile	1	1	1	3
11	Grenada	1	1	0	2
12	Saint Lucia	1	0	1	2
12	Venezuela	1	0	1	2
14	Barbados	1	0	0	1
14	British Virgin Islands	1	0	0	1
14	Costa Rica	1	0	0	1
17	Trinidad and Tobago	0	3	1	4
18	Antigua and Barbuda	0	1	1	2
18	Guatemala	0	1	1	2
18	Puerto Rico	0	1	1	2
21	Uruguay	0	0	2	2
22	Argentina	0	0	1	1
22	Bahamas	0	0	1	1
22	Dominican Republic	0	0	1	1
Totals (24 entries)		48	48	48	144

== Results ==
=== Men ===
Event	Gold		Silver		Bronze	
100 metres	Mike Rodgers; United States	10.09	Paulo André de Oliveira; Brazil	10.16	Cejhae Greene; Antigua and Barbuda	10.23
200 metres	Álex Quiñónez; Ecuador	20.27	Jereem Richards; Trinidad and Tobago	20.38	Yancarlos Martínez; Dominican Republic	20.44
400 metres	Anthony Zambrano; Colombia	44.83	Demish Gaye; Jamaica	44.94	Justin Robinson; United States	45.07
800 metres	Marco Arop; Canada	1:44.25; GR, PB	Wesley Vázquez; Puerto Rico	1:44.48	Ryan Sánchez; Puerto Rico	1:45.19
1500 metres	José Carlos Villarreal; Mexico	3:39.93	John Gregorek Jr. United States	3:40.42	William Paulson; Canada	3:41.15
5000 metres	Fernando Martínez; Mexico	13:53.87	Altobeli da Silva; Brazil	13:54.42	Carlos Díaz; Chile	13:54.43
10,000 metres	Ederson Pereira; Brazil	28:27.47; PB	Reid Buchanan; United States	28:28.41	Lawi Lalang; United States	28:31.75
110 metres hurdles	Shane Brathwaite; Barbados	13.31	Freddie Crittenden; United States	13.32	Eduardo de Deus; Brazil	13.48
400 metres hurdles	Alison dos Santos; Brazil	48.45; PB	Amere Lattin; United States	48.98	Kemar Mowatt; Jamaica	49.09
3000 metres steeplechase	Altobeli da Silva; Brazil	8:30.73	Carlos San Martín; Colombia	8:32.24	Mario Bazán; Peru	8:32.34
4 × 100 metres relay	Brazil; Rodrigo do Nascimento; Jorge Vides; Derick Silva; Paulo André de Oliveira	38.27	Trinidad and Tobago; Jerod Elcock; Keston Bledman; Akanni Hislop; Kyle Greaux	38.46; SB	United States; Jarret Eaton; Cravon Gillespie; Bryce Robinson; Mike Rodgers	38.79
4 × 400 metres relay	Colombia; Jhon Perlaza; Diego Palomeque; Jhon Solís; Anthony Zambrano	3:01.41	United States; Mar'Yea Harris; Michael Cherry; Justin Robinson; Wilbert London	3:01.72	Trinidad and Tobago; Dwight St. Hillaire; Jereem Richards; Deon Lendore; Machel Cedenio	3:02.25
Marathon	Cristhian Pacheco; Peru	2:09:31; GR	José Luis Santana; Mexico	2:10:54; PB	Juan Joel Pacheco; Mexico	2:12:10
20 kilometres walk	Brian Pintado; Ecuador	1:21:51	Caio Bonfim; Brazil	1:21:57	José Alejandro Barrondo; Guatemala	1:21:57
50 kilometres walk	Claudio Villanueva; Ecuador	3:50:01; PB	Horacio Nava; Mexico	3:51:45; SB	Diego Pinzón; Colombia	3:53:49; PB
High jump	Luis Zayas; Cuba	2.30; PB	Michael Mason; Canada	2.28	Roberto Vílches; Mexico	2.26
Pole vault	Chris Nilsen; United States	5.76	Augusto Dutra; Brazil	5.71	Clayton Fritsch; United States	5.61
Long jump	Juan Miguel Echevarría; Cuba	8.27	Tajay Gayle; Jamaica	8.17	Emiliano Lasa; Uruguay	7.87
Triple jump	Omar Craddock; United States	17.42	Jordan Díaz; Cuba	17.38	Andy Díaz; Cuba	16.83
Shot put	Darlan Romani; Brazil	22.07; GR	Jordan Geist; United States	20.67	Uziel Muñoz; Mexico	20.56
Discus throw	Fedrick Dacres; Jamaica	67.68; GR	Traves Smikle; Jamaica	65.02	Reginald Jagers III; United States	64.48
Hammer throw	Gabriel Kehr; Chile	74.98	Humberto Mansilla; Chile	74.38	Sean Donnelly; United States	74.23
Javelin throw	Anderson Peters; Grenada	87.31; GR	Keshorn Walcott; Trinidad and Tobago	83.55	Albert Reynolds; Saint Lucia	82.19; PB
Decathlon	Damian Warner; Canada	8513	Lindon Victor; Grenada	8240	Pierce LePage; Canada	8161

=== Women ===
Event	Gold		Silver		Bronze	
100 metres^{[a]}	Elaine Thompson; Jamaica	11.18	Vitória Cristina Rosa; Brazil	11.30	Ángela Gabriela Tenorio; Ecuador	11.34
200 metres	Shelly-Ann Fraser-Pryce; Jamaica	22.43; GR	Vitória Cristina Rosa; Brazil	22.62	Tynia Gaither; Bahamas	22.76
400 metres	Shericka Jackson; Jamaica	50.73	Paola Morán; Mexico	51.02; PB	Courtney Okolo; United States	51.22
800 metres	Natoya Goule; Jamaica	2:01.26	Rose Mary Almanza; Cuba	2:01.64	Déborah Rodríguez; Uruguay	2:01.66
1500 metres	Nikki Hiltz; United States	4:07.14	Aisha Praught; Jamaica	4:08.26	Alexa Efraimson; United States	4:08.63
5000 metres	Laura Galván; Mexico	15:35:47	Jessica O'Connell; Canada	15:36:08	Kim Conley; United States	15:36:95
10,000 metres	Natasha Wodak; Canada	31:55.17; GR	Risper Gesabwa; Mexico	31.59.00; PB	Rachel Cliff; Canada	32:13.34
100 metres hurdles	Andrea Vargas; Costa Rica	12.82	Chanel Brissett; United States	12.99	Megan Simmonds; Jamaica	13.01
400 metres hurdles	Sage Watson; Canada	55.16; SB	Anna Cockrell; United States	55.50	Rushell Clayton; Jamaica	55.53
3000 metres steeplechase	Geneviève Lalonde; Canada	9:41.45; GR	Marisa Howard; United States	9:43.78	Belén Casetta; Argentina	9:44.46
4 × 100 metres relay	Brazil; Andressa Fidelis; Vitória Cristina Rosa; Lorraine Martins; Rosângela Santos	43.04; SB	Canada; Khamica Bingham; Crystal Emmanuel; Ashlan Best; Leya Buchanan	43.37; SB	United States; Chanel Brissett; Twanisha Terry; Shania Collins; Lynna Irby	43.39
4 × 400 metres relay	United States; Lynna Irby; Jaide Stepter; Anna Cockrell; Courtney Okolo	3:26.46	Canada; Natassha McDonald; Aiyanna Stiverne; Kyra Constantine; Sage Watson	3:27.01	Jamaica; Stephanie McPherson; Tiffany James; Natoya Goule; Roniesha McGregor	3:27.61
Marathon	Gladys Tejeda; Peru	2:30:55; GR	Bethany Sachtleben; United States	2:31:20; PB	Angie Orjuela; Colombia	2:32:27; PB
20 kilometres walk	Sandra Arenas; Colombia	1:28:03; GR, NR	Kimberly García; Peru	1:29:00; SB	Érica de Sena; Brazil	1:30:34
50 kilometres walk	Johana Ordóñez; Ecuador	4:11:12; GR, AR	Mirna Ortiz; Guatemala	4:15:21	Paola Pérez; Ecuador	4:16:54
High jump	Levern Spencer; Saint Lucia	1.87	Priscilla Frederick; Antigua and Barbuda	1.87	Kimberly Williamson; Jamaica	1.84
Pole vault	Yarisley Silva; Cuba	4.75; SB	Katie Nageotte; United States	4.70	Alysha Newman; Canada	4.55
Long jump	Chantel Malone; British Virgin Islands	6.68	Keturah Orji; United States	6.66	Tissanna Hickling; Jamaica	6.59
Triple jump	Yulimar Rojas; Venezuela	15.11; GR	Shanieka Ricketts; Jamaica	14.77; PB	Liadagmis Povea; Cuba	14.60
Shot put	Danniel Thomas-Dodd; Jamaica	19.55; GR	Brittany Crew; Canada	19.07; PB	Jessica Ramsey; United States	19.01; SB
Discus throw^{[b]}	Yaime Pérez; Cuba	66.58; GR	Fernanda Martins; Brazil	62.23	Denia Caballero; Cuba	60.46
Hammer throw	Gwen Berry; United States	74.62	Brooke Andersen; United States	71.07	Rosa Rodríguez; Venezuela	69.48
Javelin throw	Kara Winger; United States	64.92; SB	Elizabeth Gleadle; Canada	63.30	Ariana Ince; United States	62.32
Heptathlon	Adriana Rodríguez; Cuba	6113	Annie Kunz; United States	5990	Martha Araújo; Colombia	5925

- ^{100 metres} Silver medalist Michelle-Lee Ahye of Trinidad and Tobago was disqualified for whereabouts failures.
- ^{discus throw} Silver medalist Andressa de Morais of Brazil was disqualified for doping violations.

== See also ==
- Athletics at the 2015 Pan American Games
- Athletics at the 2019 European Games
- Athletics at the 2019 Parapan American Games
- Athletics at the 2020 Summer Olympics
