= Justin Robinson (sprinter) =

American sprinter (born 2002)

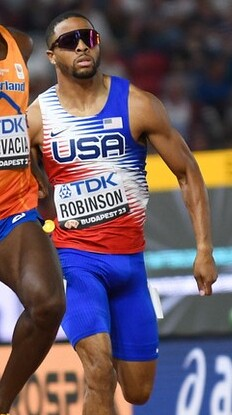
- Robinson in 2023

Personal information
- Born: March 30, 2002 (age 24) St. Louis, Missouri, U.S.
- Height: 5 ft 9 in (1.75 m)
- Weight: 150 lb (68 kg)

Sport
- Country: United States
- Sport: Track and field
- Event: Sprints
- College team: Arizona State Sun Devils
- Coached by: Dion Miller; Sean Burris

Achievements and titles
- Personal bests: 100 m: 10.32 (2019); 200 m: 20.37 (2023); 400 m: 44.47 (2023, WYB)
Medal record
Men's athletics
Representing the United States
World Championships
Gold medal – first place	2023 Budapest	4 × 400 m relay
Gold medal – first place	2023 Budapest	4 × 400 m mixed
World Indoor Championships
Gold medal – first place	2026 Toruń	4 × 400 m relay
Pan American Games
Silver medal – second place	2019 Lima	4 × 400 m relay
Bronze medal – third place	2019 Lima	400 m
World U20 Championships
Silver medal – second place	2018 Tampere	4 × 400 m relay
Pan American U20 Championships
Gold medal – first place	2019 San José	400 m
Gold medal – first place	2019 San José	4 × 400 m relay

Justin Robinson (born March 30, 2002) is an American sprinter specializing in the 400 meters. He set the world under-18 best in the boys' 400 meters in June 2019 becoming the first U18 athlete to break the 45 second barrier with a time of 44.84 seconds. He was the 2019 Pan American under-20 champion in the men's 400 meters, and helped set the world under-20 record in winning the men's 4 × 400 meters relay for the United States, splitting 43.7 seconds on the last lap for a time of 2:59.30.

Robinson has additionally won medals at the 2019 Pan American Games, earning a bronze medal in the 400 meters and a silver in the 4 × 400 meters relay, as well as a silver at the 2018 World Under-20 Championships in the 4 × 400 meters relay.

== Biography ==
Robinson's speed was noticed after winning a footrace and playing football with a cousin in his freshman year of high school, who introduced him to track and field.

Robinson set a new Boy's World Youth Best of 44.84 seconds over 400 metres on June 8, 2019. It was the fastest 400-meter time for an American high schooler since Darrell Robinson in 1982.

At the 2018 IAAF World U20 Championships in Tampere, Finland, Robinson won a silver medal as part of the men's 4 × 400 m relay squad.

He graduated from Hazelwood West High School in Hazelwood, Missouri in May 2020. He signed a letter of intent to attend Arizona State University.

His 2020 season was limited due to the COVID-19 pandemic, but in his only 400 m race he ran 44.91 s, the fastest time in the world that year.

Records
Preceded by (United States) Obea Moore	Boys' world under-18 best holder, 400 metres 8 June 2019 – 21 June 2024	Succeeded by (United States) Quincy Wilson
