= Juan Pacheco (runner) =

Mexican long-distance runner

Personal information
- Born: 11 December 1990 (age 35) Torreón, Mexico

Sport
- Country: Mexico
- Sport: Athletics
- Event: Long-distance running
Medal record
Representing Mexico
Pan American Games
Bronze medal – third place	2019 Lima	Marathon

Juan Pacheco (born 11 December 1990) is a Mexican long-distance runner. He competed in the men's race at the 2020 World Athletics Half Marathon Championships held in Gdynia, Poland.

In 2019, he won the bronze medal in the men's marathon at the Pan American Games held in Lima, Peru.

He represented Mexico in the men's marathon at the 2020 Summer Olympics in Tokyo, Japan.
