= Kyra Constantine =

Canadian sprinter (born 1998)

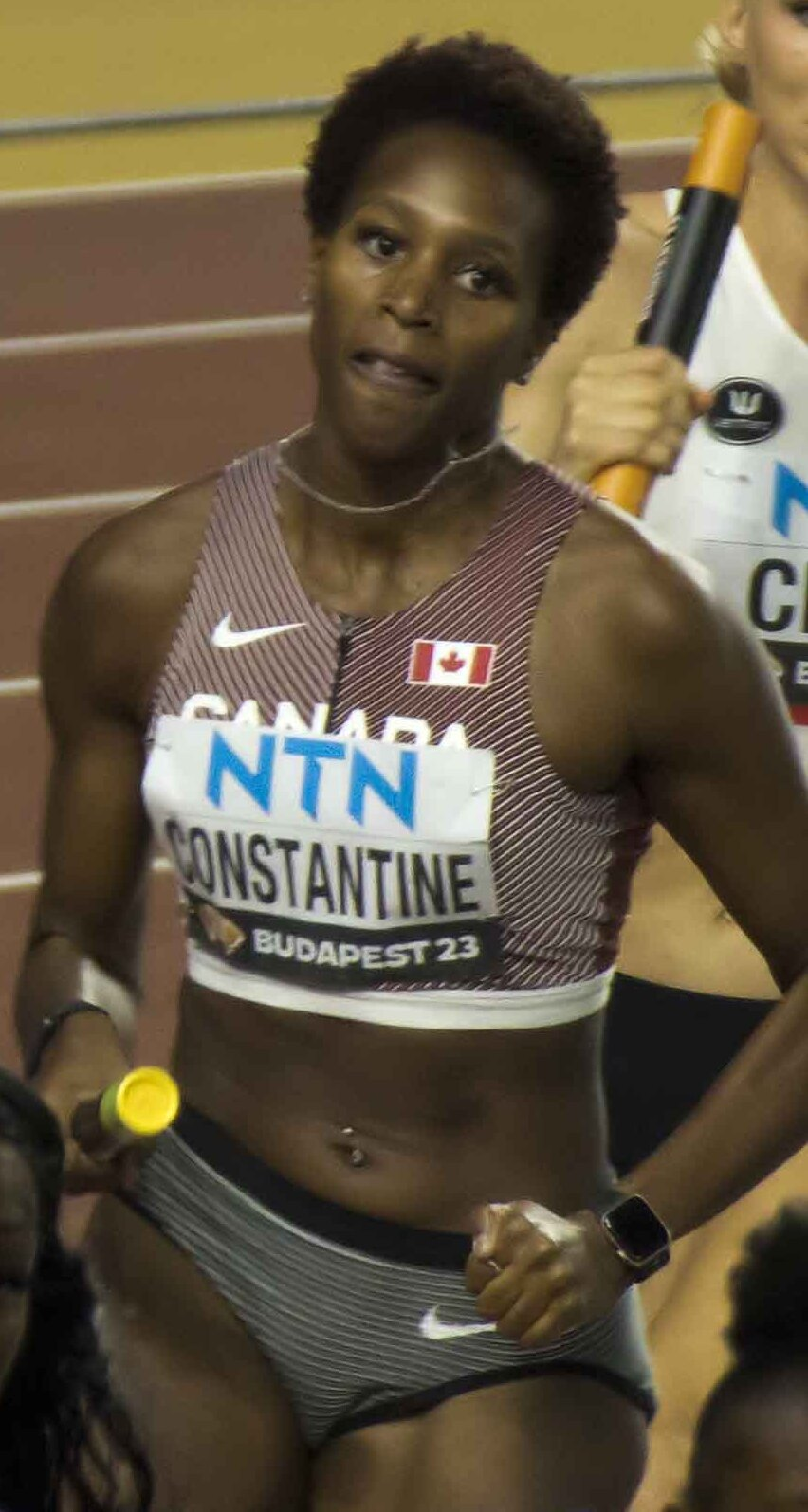
- Kyra Constantine in 2023

Personal information
- Full name: Kyra Cheresse Constantine
- Born: August 1, 1998 (age 27) Toronto, Ontario
- Height: 175 cm (5 ft 9 in)

Sport
- Country: Canada
- Sport: Athletics
- Event: Sprints
- College team: USC Trojans (2017–2021)

Achievements and titles
- Personal best: 400 m: 50.87 (2021)
Medal record
Women's athletics
Representing Canada
World Athletics Relays
Bronze medal – third place	2024 Nassau	4×400 m relay
Commonwealth Games
Gold medal – first place	2022 Birmingham	4×400 m relay
Pan American Games
Silver medal – second place	2019 Lima	4×400 m relay
Pan American U20 Championships
Silver medal – second place	2017 Trujillo	4×400 m relay
Bronze medal – third place	2017 Trujillo	400 m
World Youth Championships
Bronze medal – third place	2015 Cali	4×400 m mixed

Kyra Cheresse Constantine (born August 1, 1998) is a Canadian sprinter specializing in the 400 metres. She won the silver medal in the women's 4 × 400 metres relay event at the 2019 Pan American Games held in Lima, Peru. She also competed in the women's 400 metres event.

In 2014, she competed in the girls' 400 metres event at the Summer Youth Olympics held in Nanjing, China.

She competed in the women's 400 metres event at the 2020 Summer Olympics held in Tokyo, Japan. As well, she was part of the Canadian team that finished in fourth place in the 4 × 400 metres relay.

At the 2022 Commonwealth Games, she was the anchor leg of the Canada team that won gold in the women's 4 x 400 metres relay final. Ironically, she had actually finished second, behind England's Jessie Knight by 0.01 seconds in a photo-finish, but was awarded the gold due to an earlier lane infraction by England.

She attended St. Roch Secondary School as a high school student. From 2016 - 2021 she attended the University of Southern California. While there she was a PAC 12 Champion in the women’s 400m and 9 time NCAA All American.
