= Athletics at the 2019 Pan American Games – Men's 200 metres =

Men's 200 metres at the 2019 Pan American Games
- Venue: Athletics Stadium
- Dates: August 8 – August 9
- Competitors: 20 from 13 nations
- Winning time: 20.27

Medalists
| Gold medal | Álex Quiñónez; Ecuador |
| Silver medal | Jereem Richards; Trinidad and Tobago |
| Bronze medal | Yancarlos Martínez; Dominican Republic |

The men's 200 metres competition of the athletics events at the 2019 Pan American Games will take place between the 8 and 9 of August at the 2019 Pan American Games Athletics Stadium. The defending Pan American Games champion is Andre De Grasse from Canada.

== Summary ==
10 years off his greatest success, returning bronze medalist Alonso Edward was the early leader, burning the turn with Reynier Mena making up the stagger on Álex Quiñónez to his outside, the next contender and Jerome Blake on the far outside. From dead last mid-turn, Quiñónez began to gain as they came off the turn. At a much faster cadence, he passed Edward 50 metres from the finish and was off for gold. On the far inside, Jereem Richards also accelerated and was catching people from behind. And last onto the home stretch, Yancarlos Martínez was also picking up ground. Martínez passed Edwards 8 meters from the finish, crossing two metres behind Quiñónez and a metre behind Richards.

== Records ==
Prior to this competition, the existing world and Pan American Games records were as follows:

| World record | Usain Bolt (JAM) | 19.19 | Berlin, Germany | August 20, 2009 |
| Pan American Games record | Rasheed Dwyer (JAM) | 19.80 | Toronto, Canada | July 23, 2015 |

== Schedule ==
| Date | Time | Round |
|---|---|---|
| August 8, 2019 | 16:00 | Semifinal |
| August 9, 2019 | 16:30 | Final |

== Results ==
All times shown are in seconds.

| KEY: | q | Fastest non-qualifiers | Q | Qualified | NR | National record | PB | Personal best | SB | Seasonal best | DQ | Disqualified |

=== Semifinal ===
Qualification: First 2 in each heat (Q) and next 2 fastest (q) qualified for the final.
Wind:
Heat 1: -0.1 m/s, Heat 2: +0.4 m/s, Heat 3: -0.9 m/s

| Rank | Heat | Name | Nationality | Time | Notes |
|---|---|---|---|---|---|
| 1 | 1 | Álex Quiñónez | Ecuador | 20.41 | Q |
| 2 | 1 | Yancarlos Martínez | Dominican Republic | 20.45 | Q, PB |
| 3 | 1 | Jereem Richards | Trinidad and Tobago | 20.48 | q |
| 4 | 2 | Reynier Mena | Cuba | 20.56 | Q |
| 5 | 2 | Jerome Blake | Canada | 20.63 | Q, SB |
| 6 | 3 | Alonso Edward | Panama | 20.65 | Q |
| 7 | 3 | Roberto Skyers | Cuba | 20.66 | Q |
| 8 | 2 | Andre Ewers | Jamaica | 20.69 | q |
| 9 | 3 | Brendon Rodney | Canada | 20.74 | |
| 10 | 3 | Derick Silva | Brazil | 20.76 | |
| 11 | 2 | Jorge Vides | Brazil | 20.80 | |
| 12 | 1 | Julian Forte | Jamaica | 21.18 | |
| 13 | 1 | Brandon Valentine-Parris | Saint Vincent and the Grenadines | 21.47 | |
| 14 | 1 | Cliff Resias | Bahamas | 21.74 | |
| 15 | 2 | Hector Allen | Costa Rica | 21.79 | |
| 16 | 3 | Kyle Greaux | Trinidad and Tobago | 22.71 | |
| 17 | 3 | Andrew Hudson | United States | 42.96 | |
| | 1 | Virjilio Griggs | Panama | DNF | |
| | 2 | Bernardo Baloyes | Colombia | DSQ | |
| | 3 | Mauricio Garrido | Peru | DSQ | |

=== Final ===
The results were as follows

Wind: -1.0 m/s

| Rank | Lane | Name | Nationality | Time | Notes |
|---|---|---|---|---|---|
| 1st place, gold medalist(s) | 5 | Álex Quiñónez | Ecuador | 20.27 | |
| 2nd place, silver medalist(s) | 2 | Jereem Richards | Trinidad and Tobago | 20.38 | |
| 3rd place, bronze medalist(s) | 7 | Yancarlos Martínez | Dominican Republic | 20.44 | |
| 4 | 6 | Alonso Edward | Panama | 20.55 | |
| 5 | 4 | Reynier Mena | Cuba | 20.62 | |
| 6 | 9 | Jerome Blake | Canada | 20.66 | |
| 7 | 8 | Roberto Skyers | Cuba | 20.67 | |
| 8 | 3 | Andre Ewers | Jamaica | 20.91 | |
