= Athletics at the 2019 Pan American Games – Men's 400 metres hurdles =

Men's 400 metres hurdles at the 2019 Pan American Games
- Venue: Athletics Stadium
- Dates: August 6 – August 8
- Competitors: 14 from 11 nations
- Winning time: 48.45

Medalists
| Gold medal | Alison dos Santos | Brazil |
| Silver medal | Amere Lattin | United States |
| Bronze medal | Kemar Mowatt | Jamaica |

The men's 400 metres hurdles competition of the athletics events at the 2019 Pan American Games will take place between the 6 and 8 of August at the 2019 Pan American Games Athletics Stadium. The defending Pan American Games champion is Jeffery Gibson from the Bahamas.

== Summary ==
Leading semi-finalist Juander Santos continued his domination of the field, building to a significant 3 step lead on his nearest chaser by the 8th hurdle. He began to pay for his early speed, slowing as he turned for home. Alison dos Santos was gaining over the 9th hurdle and Juander could sense a challenge coming as he stretched his steps to get over the 10th. Juander's lead foot hit the hurdle squarely and he crashed to the ground. Clearing it cleanly, Alison cruised in, hands outstretched, to an easy win.

== Records ==
Prior to this competition, the existing world and Pan American Games records were as follows:

| World record | Kevin Young (USA) | 46.78 | Barcelona, Spain | August 8, 1992 |
| Pan American Games record | Omar Cisneros (CUB) | 47.99 | Guadalajara, Mexico | October 27, 2011 |

== Schedule ==
| Date | Time | Round |
|---|---|---|
| August 6, 2019 | 16:40 | Semifinal |
| August 8, 2019 | 18:15 | Final |

== Results ==
All times shown are in seconds.

| KEY: | q | Fastest non-qualifiers | Q | Qualified | NR | National record | PB | Personal best | SB | Seasonal best | DQ | Disqualified |

=== Semifinal ===
Qualification: First 3 in each heat (Q) and next 2 fastest (q) qualified for the final. The results were as follows:

| Rank | Heat | Name | Nationality | Time | Notes |
|---|---|---|---|---|---|
| 1 | 1 | Juander Santos | Dominican Republic | 49.44 | Q, SB |
| 2 | 1 | Alison dos Santos | Brazil | 49.74 | Q |
| 3 | 2 | Amere Lattin | United States | 49.75 | Q |
| 4 | 2 | Kemar Mowatt | Jamaica | 49.84 | Q |
| 5 | 1 | Guillermo Ruggeri | Argentina | 49.97 | Q |
| 6 | 1 | Norman Grimes | United States | 50.04 | q |
| 7 | 2 | Jeffery Gibson | Bahamas | 50.09 | Q |
| 8 | 2 | Leandro Zamora | Cuba | 50.31 | q |
| 9 | 2 | Gerald Drummond | Costa Rica | 50.35 | |
| 10 | 1 | Pablo Andrés Ibáñez | El Salvador | 50.70 | SB |
| 11 | 1 | Romel Lewis | Jamaica | 50.87 | |
| 12 | 1 | Andre Colebrook | Bahamas | 51.76 | |
| 13 | 2 | Alfredo Sepúlveda | Chile | 52.77 | |
| 14 | 2 | Paulo Herrera | Peru | 54.09 | |

=== Final ===
The results were as follows:

| Rank | Lane | Name | Nationality | Time | Notes |
|---|---|---|---|---|---|
| 1st place, gold medalist(s) | 5 | Alison dos Santos | Brazil | 48.45 | AU20R |
| 2nd place, silver medalist(s) | 7 | Amere Lattin | United States | 48.98 | |
| 3rd place, bronze medalist(s) | 4 | Kemar Mowatt | Jamaica | 49.09 | |
| 4 | 9 | Jeffery Gibson | Bahamas | 49.53 | SB |
| 5 | 8 | Guillermo Ruggeri | Argentina | 49.55 | SB |
| 6 | 2 | Norman Grimes | United States | 49.65 | |
| 7 | 3 | Leandro Zamora | Cuba | 50.29 | |
| 8 | 6 | Juander Santos | Dominican Republic | 2:09.37 | |
