= Alexa Efraimson =

American middle-distance runner

Alexa Gusman (née Efraimson)
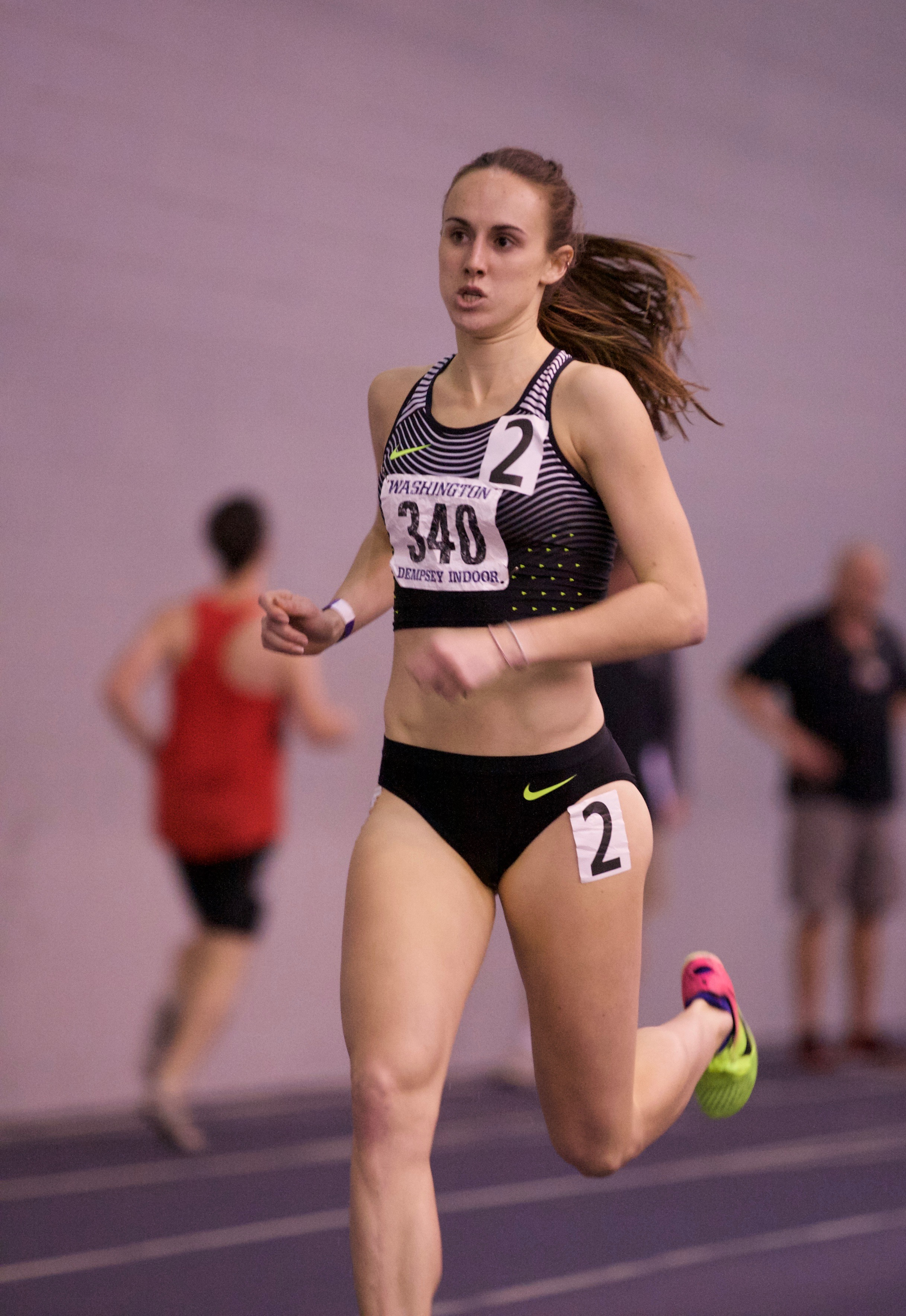
- Efraimson in 2017

Personal information
- Born: February 20, 1997 (age 29) Camas, Washington, U.S.
- Height: 5 ft 8 in (173 cm)

Sport
- Sport: Track, Running
- Events: 800 metres, 1500 metres, cross country running
- Club: Nike
- Turned pro: 2014
- Coached by: Pete Julian
- Retired: 2022
Medal record
Representing United States
Pan American Games
| Bronze medal – third place | 2019 Lima | 1500 m |
World Youth Championships in Athletics
| Bronze medal – third place | 2013 Donetsk | 1500 m |

Alexa Efraimson (born February 20, 1997), now Alexa Gusman, is an American former professional middle distance runner from Camas, Washington who competed for Nike. Efraimson is now a Registered Dietitian. During the 2014 indoor and outdoor season, as a junior, she set a pair of U.S. high-school records, breaking Mary Cain's 2013 mark in the indoor 3,000 meters (9:02.10) with a time of 9:00.16 and running 4:33.29 in the 1,600 meters to shave 0.53 seconds from Christine Babcock's 4:33.82, set in 2008. Efraimson captured the bronze medal in the 1,500 meters at the 2013 World (U18) Youth Championships in Donetsk, Ukraine.

== 2013 ==
Alexa won the Washington State track and field meet in 800 metres in 2:08.17 and 1600 metres in 4:39.25. Efraimson earned bronze medal placing 3rd in 4:16.07 in the 1500m at the 8th IAAF World Youth Championships. She was also the 2013 Nike Cross Nationals champion. Alexa was the Gatorade® National Girls Cross Country Runner of the Year.

== 2014 ==
On February 1, high school junior Alexa Efraimson ran 9:00.16 to finish 4th in the 3,000m at the 2014 University of Washington Invitational, breaking Mary Cain's 9:02.10 United States high school national records in track and field which Mary ran on the same track one year earlier. At the Washington State High School track and field meet, Alexa continued her record-breaking ways, winning the 800 metres in 2:04.10 (Breaking the state meet record) and won the 1600m, setting a national high school record times for the 1600 metres in 4:33.29.

Alexa won the high school national Brooks PR Invitational on the Renton Memorial Stadium track in the 800 metres running 2:03.26, defeating Raevyn Rogers, defending national champion and bronze medalist from the 2013 World Youth Championships at 800m.

2014 Diamond League
Alexa raced against professionals at New York City Adidas Grand Prix in the 1500 meters on June 14, 2014, and finished 10th running a Personal Best time of 4:07.05.

2014 USA Junior Outdoor Championships
Alexa Efraimson held off Elise Cranny in the featured 1500 metres running 4:16.87 on July 6 in Eugene, Oregon at the 2014 US Junior Outdoor championships to win her first US Junior title and qualify to the IAAF World Junior Outdoor championships.

2014 IAAF World Junior Championships
Efraimson raced the 1st round of the 1500 metres on July 25 at 12:15 PM PST and Final on July 27 at 3:55 PM PST. Efraimson finished 4th in the prelims in 4:16.87 to Automatically Qualify to the final. Alexa finished 6th in final of the 1500 meters in 4:13.31.

== 2015 ==
16:09.44 PAYTON JORDAN May 2, 2015
4:09.43 Walnut (Hilmer Lodge), CA April 17, 2015
2:01.13 Portland, OR May 17, 2015
4:03.39 1500m PRE Classic May 30, 2015 (New American High School & Junior Record)

== 2016 ==
Alexa Efraimson competed well setting lifetime personal best in the following events.
800m 2:00.99 Portland (USA) May 15, 2016
1500m ind. 4:09.20 New York (USA) February 20, 2016 Millrose Games
Mile 4:27.39 Rovereto (ITA) 06.09.2016
Mile ind. 4:28.91 New York (USA) February 20, 2016 Millrose Games
3000m 9:11.48 Lausanne (SUI) August 25, 2016

At the 2016 United States Olympic Trials placed 6th in 1500 meters in 4:07.34.

== 2017 ==
Mile Road 4:35.0h Brooklyn (USA) August 20, 2017
1500m 4:04.75 Heusden-Zolder (BEL) July 22, 2017
800m 2:00.95 Portland, OR (USA) 11.06.2017
At the 2017 USA Outdoor Track and Field Championships, placed 5th in 1500 meters in 4:08.36. Alexa Efraimson is ranked 20th in global rankings in the 1500 meters.
1500m 4:17.54 Des Moines (USA) April 29, 2017 Drake Relays
Mile ind. 4:29.54 New York (USA) November 2, 2017 Millrose Games

At the 2017 USA Indoor Track and Field Championships, Alexa Efraimson placed 5th in Mile in 4:48.49.

== 2018 ==
At the 2018 Millrose Games, Alexa Efraimson placed 7th in the mile in 4:32.73.

At the 2018 USA Indoor Track and Field Championships, Alexa Efraimson placed 6th in 1500.

At the 2018 Prefontaine Classic, Alexa Efraimson placed 2nd in 1500 in a time of 4:08

At the 2018 USA Outdoor Track and Field Championships, Alexa Efraimson placed 22nd in 1500.

At the 2018 KBC Night of Athletics, Alexa Efraimson placed 3rd in 1500 in a season best time of 4:07.06.

== Professional career ==
Alexa Efraimson, the 2013 Nike Cross Nationals and 2014 USA Junior 1500-meter champion, has signed a contract with Nike, and will forgo her final year of high school and collegiate racing eligibility. She'll continue to work with her high school coach, Michael Hickey. Coach Hickey has consulted with Nike Oregon Project coach Alberto Salazar over several years and said that there could be situations where Efraimson joins Cain and other Nike athletes for workouts. Efraimson is represented by Flynn Sports Management.

Camas Mayor Scott Higgins on Monday night, following his proclamation that Friday, August 8, would be "Alexa Efraimson Appreciation Day".

On September 27, 2014, Alexa debuted as a professional athlete running for her Nike sponsor at Stanford Invitational 6 km cross country race where Efraimson finished 3rd after leading most of the race.

Efraimson announced on her Instagram page on November 2, 2022, that she was retiring from her professional running career.

| Year | Competition | Venue | Position | Event | Notes |
Representing the United States
International Championships
| 2013 | 2013 IAAF World Youth (U18) Championships | Donetsk, Ukraine | 3rd | 1500 m | 4:16.07 |
| 2014 | 2014 IAAF World Junior (U20) Championships | Eugene, Oregon | 6th | 1500 m | 4:13.31 |
| 2019 | Pan American Games | Lima, Peru | 3rd | 1500 m | 4:08.63 |
USA Track and Field Championships
| 2013 | 2013 World Youth Track & Field Trials | Edwardsville, Illinois | 1st | 1500 m | 4:23.12 |
| 2014 | USA Junior (U20) Outdoor Track and Field Championships | Eugene, Oregon | 1st | 1500 m | 4:16.87 |
| 2014 | USA Outdoor Track and Field Championships | Sacramento, California | 16th | 1500 m | 4:12.89 |
| 2014 | Representing Nike | | | | |
| 2015 | USA Indoor Track and Field Championships | Boston, Massachusetts | 6th | 1000 m | 2:41.23 |
| 2015 | USA Outdoor Track and Field Championships | Eugene, Oregon | 14th | 1500 m | 4:15.21 |
| 2016 | USA Indoor Track and Field Championships | Portland, Oregon | 6th | 1500 m | 4:13.44 |
| 2016 | USA Olympic Trials Track and Field Championships | Eugene, Oregon | 6th | 1500 m | 4:07.34 |
| 2017 | USA Indoor Track and Field Championships | Albuquerque, New Mexico | 5th | Mile | 4:48.49 |
| 2017 | USA Outdoor Track and Field Championships | Sacramento, California | 5th | 1500 m | 4:08.36 |
| 2018 | USA Indoor Track and Field Championships | Albuquerque, New Mexico | 6th | 1500 m | 4:15.57 |
| 2018 | USA Outdoor Track and Field Championships | Des Moines, Iowa | 22nd | 1500 m | 4:15.90 |
| 2019 | USA Outdoor Track and Field Championships | Des Moines, Iowa | 15th | 1500 m | 4:12.35 |

== Personal life ==
Alexa's mother, Chantel (born 1976), was a member of the swim team and an Oregon State University graduate.
