= Jessica Ramsey =

American shot putter (born 1991)

Personal information
- Born: July 26, 1991 (age 34) Boynton Beach, Florida
- Home town: Boynton Beach, Florida
- Height: 5 ft 6 in (168 cm)
- Weight: 205 lb (93 kg)

Sport
- Country: United States
- Sport: Athletics/ Track and field
- Event: Shot put
- University team: Western Kentucky Hilltoppers track and field South Plains College
- Club: Adidas
- Turned pro: 2014
Medal record
Representing United States
Pan American Games
Bronze medal – third place	2019 Lima	Shot put
NACAC Championships
Silver medal – second place	2025 Freeport	Shot put
Bronze medal – third place	2018 Toronto	Shot put
Bronze medal – third place	2022 Freeport	Shot put

Jessica Ramsey (born July 26, 1991) is an American shot putter. She won the bronze medal in the women's shot put event at the 2019 Pan American Games held in Lima, Peru.

From Boynton Beach, Florida, she went to Western Kentucky University to study Social and Behavioral Science. She became the first woman from Western Kentucky ever to qualify for the NCAA Outdoor Track and Field Championships in three separate individual events: discus, shot put and hammer throw.

At the 2019 Shanghai IAAF Diamond League meet she finished 4th in the shot put competition. In Marietta, Georgia on August 29, 2020 Ramsey threw 18.64 m (61 ft 2 in) which put her in the top 10 for the year worldwide for the shot put in 2020.

At the Olympic Trials on 24 June 2021, Ramsey threw a US Olympic Trials Championships Record to win the women's shot put 20.12 m (66 ft 0 in).

== Competition record ==
Year	Competition	Venue	Position	Event	Notes
Representing the United States
2018	NACAC Championships	Toronto, Canada	3rd	Shot Put	17.80 m (58 ft 5 in)
2019	Pan American Games	Lima, Peru	3rd	Shot Put	19.01 m (62 ft 4 in)
2021	Olympic Games	Tokyo, Japan	12th	Shot Put	Foul
2022	NACAC Championships	Freeport, Bahamas	3rd	Shot put	18.74 m
2025	World Indoor Championships	Nanjing, China	11th	Shot put	17.81 m
2025	NACAC Championships	Freeport, Bahamas	2nd	Shot put	18.27 m

== College ==
Ramsey is a 6-time All-American in college while she represented Western Kentucky University and South Plains College. Ramsey won 7 Sun Belt Conference titles in the Shot Put, Hammer, Discus, and Weight throw as a Western Kentucky Lady Toppers.

Ramsey holds the Western Kentucky Lady Toppers school record in the outdoor shot put (17.49 m (57 ft 5 in), Discus (53.85 m (176 ft 8 in), 2nd place in the hammer (61.44 m (201 ft 7 in), Indoor shot put (16.47 m (54 ft 0 in), Weight Throw (20.37 m (66 ft 10 in)).

Western Kentucky	Sun Belt Conference Indoor track and field Championship	NCAA Indoor track and field Championship	Sun Belt Conference Outdoor Track and Field Championship	NCAA Outdoor Track and Field Championship
Senior 2014	Shot Put; 16.47 m (54 ft 0 in) 1st		Shot Put; 16.99 m (55 ft 9 in) 1st	Shot Put; 16.79 m (55 ft 1 in) 8th
Senior 2014	Weight Throw; 19.38 m (63 ft 7 in) 1st		Discus; 52.50 m (172 ft 3 in) 1st	Discus; 46.24 m (151 ft 8 in) 24th
Senior 2014	Weight Throw; 19.38 m (63 ft 7 in) 1st		Hammer; 61.45 m (201 ft 7 in) 1st	Hammer; 60.56 m (198 ft 8 in) 14th
Junior 2013	Shot Put; 15.24 m (50 ft 0 in) 1st		Shot Put; 15.86 m (52 ft 0 in) 1st	Shot Put; 14.77 m (48 ft 5 in) 68th
Junior 2013	Weight Throw; 15.52 m (50 ft 11 in) 9th		Discus; 45.70 m (149 ft 11 in) 4th	Discus; Foul 23rd
Junior 2013	Weight Throw; 15.52 m (50 ft 11 in) 9th		Hammer; 51.70 m (169 ft 7 in) 3rd	
South Plains	NJCAA Indoor track and field		National Junior College Athletic Association Outdoor Track and Field	
Sophomore 2012			Discus; 47.47 m (155 ft 9 in) 4th	
Sophomore 2012			Shot Put; 15.37 m (50 ft 5 in) 2nd	
Sophomore 2012			Javelin; 29.89 m (98 ft 1 in) 11th	
Freshman 2011	Shot Put; 14.15 m (46 ft 5 in) 4th			

== Prep ==
Ramsey is a 2010 graduate of Boynton Beach Community High School in Boynton Beach, Florida where she set high school best Discus (29.32 m (96 ft 2 in)), Shot Put (14.33 m (47 ft 0 in)), 100 Meters (12.77), 200 Meters (28.30).

Ramsey set a Boynton Beach High School record in the discus which was broken in 2018 by Amber Powell. Ramsey holds a school record in the shot put.

Ramsey won 2010 Florida High School Athletic Association shot put 2A state championship with a throw of 13.098 m (42 ft 11.7 in). Ramsey won 2009 Florida High School Athletic Association shot put 3A state championship with a throw of 13.43 m (44 ft 1 in). As a sophomore, Ramsey placed 7th in the 2008 Florida High School Athletic Association shot put 3A regional championship with a throw of 11.32 m (37 ft 2 in).
