= Demish Gaye =

Jamaican sprinter (born 1993)

Personal information
- Born: 20 January 1993 (age 33) Manchester Parish, Jamaica
- Education: GC Foster College of Physical Education and Sport
- Height: 1.91 m (6 ft 3 in)
- Weight: 80 kg (176 lb)

Sport
- Country: Jamaica
- Sport: Athletics
- Event: 400 metres
Medal record
Men's athletics
Representing Jamaica
World Championships
Silver medal – second place	2019 Doha	4×400 m relay
World Relays
Silver medal – second place	2019 Yokohama	4×400 m relay
Bronze medal – third place	2017 Nassau	4×400 m relay
Pan American Games
Silver medal – second place	2019 Lima	400 m
Commonwealth Games
Bronze medal – third place	2018 Gold Coast	4×400 m relay
NACAC Championships
Gold medal – first place	2018 Toronto	400 m
Silver medal – second place	2022 Freeport	4×400 m relay
Silver medal – second place	2022 Freeport	Mixed 4×400 m relay

Demish Gaye (born 20 January 1993) is a Jamaican sprinter specialising in the 400 metres. He represented his country at the 2017 World Championships reaching the final. A year earlier he competed in the 4 × 400 metres relay at the World Indoor Championships finishing fourth.

== International competitions ==
Year	Competition	Venue	Position	Event	Notes
Representing Jamaica
2016	World Indoor Championships	Portland, United States	4th	4 × 400 m relay	3:06.02
2017	World Relays	Nassau, Bahamas	3rd	4 × 400 m relay	3:02.84
2017	World Championships	London, United Kingdom	6th	400 m	45.04
2018	Commonwealth Games	Gold Coast, Australia	6th	400 m	45.56
2018	Commonwealth Games	Gold Coast, Australia	3rd	4 × 400 m relay	3:01.97
2018	NACAC Championships	Toronto, Canada	1st	400 m	45.47
2018	NACAC Championships	Toronto, Canada	–	4 × 400 m relay	DQ
2019	World Relays	Yokohama, Japan	2nd	4 × 400 m relay	3:01.57
2019	Pan American Games	Lima, Peru	2nd	400 m	44.94
2019	World Championships	Doha, Qatar	4th	400 m	44.46
2019	World Championships	Doha, Qatar	2nd	4 × 400 m relay	2:57.90
2021	Olympic Games	Tokyo, Japan	11th (sf)	400 m	45.09
2021	Olympic Games	Tokyo, Japan	6th	4 × 400 m relay	2:58.76
2022	NACAC Championships	Freeport, Bahamas	2nd	4 × 400 m relay	3:05.47

== Personal bests ==
Outdoor

- 200 metres – 20.48 (+0.4 m/s, Kingston 2017)
- 400 metres – 44.55 (London 2017)
