= Aisha Praught-Leer =

Jamaican middle-distance runner

Aisha Praught
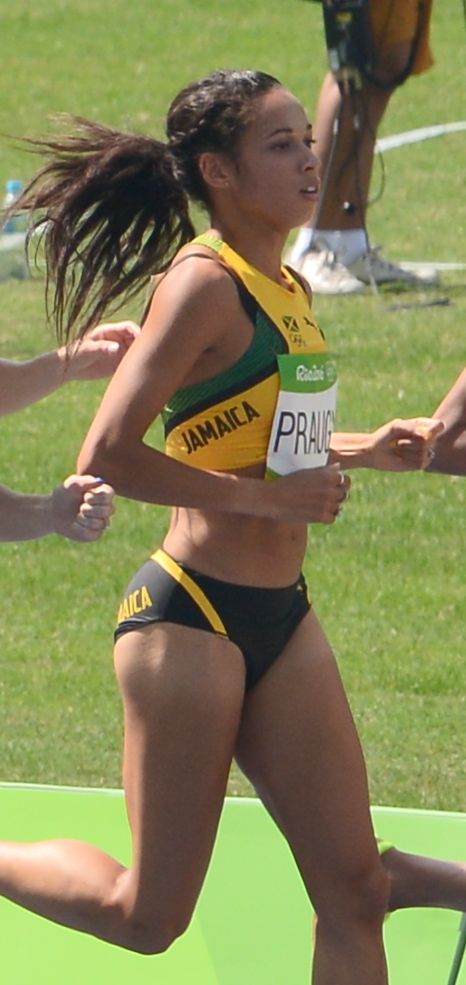
- Aisha Praught at the 2016 Olympics

Personal information
- Full name: Aisha Praught-Leer
- Nationality: Jamaican American
- Born: 14 December 1989 (age 36) Moline, Illinois, U.S.
- Height: 1.62 m (5 ft 4 in)
- Weight: 50 kg (110 lb)
- Spouse: Will Leer (2016–present)

Sport
- Country: Jamaica
- Sport: Track and field
- Events: 1500 m, 3000 m steeplechase

Achievements and titles
- Olympic finals: 2016 Rio de Janeiro; 3000 m s’chase - 14th; 2020 Tokyo; 1500 m - 40th (h)
- World finals: 2015 Beijing; 3000 m s’chase - ~~26th~~ DQ; 2017 London; 3000 m s’chase - ~~14th~~ DQ; 2019 Doha; 1500 m - 29th (h)
- Personal bests: Outdoor; 800 m: 2:05.31 (Kingston 2021); 1500 m: 4:05.52 (Kawasaki 2015); Mile: 4:26.14 (Monaco 2019); 3000 m: 8:53.43 (Lucerne 2017); 5000 m: 15:07.50 NR (Los Angeles 2019); 3000 m s’chase: 9:14.09 NR (Brussels 2018); Indoor; 1500 m: 4:04.95 i NR (Boston 2018); Mile: 4:32.86 i (Birmingham 2015); 3000 m: 8:41.10 i NR (New York 2018)
Medal record
Women's athletics
Representing Jamaica
Commonwealth Games
Gold medal – first place	2018 Gold Coast	3000 m s'chase
Pan American Games
Silver medal – second place	2019 Lima	1500 m
- Updated on 9 August 2019

Aisha Praught-Leer (born 14 December 1989 in Moline, Illinois) is a middle-distance runner from Illinois competing for Jamaica. She attended Woodrow Wilson Middle School and Moline High School. Praught competed in Athletics at the 2016 Summer Olympics after running the 1500 meters and steeplechase standards in 2015. Praught competed in the Women's 3000 metres steeplechase event at the 2015 World Championships in Athletics in Beijing, China, but was disqualified. She was the gold medalist in the steeplechase at the 2018 Commonwealth Games.

== Biography ==
Although raised by two white American parents, Aisha's biological father is a Jamaican reggae musician with whom her mother had a relationship for several years. The relationship ended after Aisha's mother returned to the United States to give birth. She married her current husband four years after Aisha's birth. In 2013, Aisha travelled to Germany to meet her birth father for the first time. She then decided to represent Jamaica to honour her heritage. She married professional runner Will Leer in 2016.

She is now a correspondent for Citius Mag, where she covers track and field events.

== 2016 Olympics ==
In the steeplechase at the 2016 Olympics, Praught was involved in an incident that also left Etenesh Diro and Sara Louise Treacy lying on the track. All three athletes were advanced to the final, where Praught beat Diro to finish in 14th place.

== Competition record ==
Year	Competition	Venue	Position	Event	Notes
2015	World Championships	Beijing, China	–	3000 m s'chase	DQ
2016	Olympic Games	Rio de Janeiro, Brazil	14th	3000 m s'chase	9:34.20
2017	World Championships	London, United Kingdom	4th (h)	3000 m s'chase	9:26.37^{1}
2018	World Indoor Championships	Birmingham, United Kingdom	6th	1500 m	4:12.86
2018	Commonwealth Games	Gold Coast, Australia	1st	3000 m s'chase	9:21.00
2019	Pan American Games	Lima, Peru	2nd	1500 m	4:08.26
2019	World Championships	Doha, Qatar	29th (h)	1500 m	4:09.81
2021	Olympic Games	Tokyo, Japan	40th (h)	1500 m	4:15.31
2023	Pan American Games	Santiago, Chile	6th	5000 m	16:23.06

^{1}Disqualified in the final

== Personal records ==
- 1500 m: 4:04.95
- 3000 m: 8:41.10
- 5000 m: 15:07.5
- 3000 m steeplechase: 9:14.09

== See also ==
- Jamaica at the 2015 World Championships in Athletics
