= Athletics at the 2019 Pan American Games – Men's 110 metres hurdles =

Men's 110 metres hurdles at the 2019 Pan American Games
- Venue: Athletics Stadium
- Dates: August 9 – August 10
- Competitors: 13 from 9 nations
- Winning time: 13.31

Medalists
Gold medal	Shane Brathwaite	Barbados
Silver medal	Freddie Crittenden	United States
Bronze medal	Eduardo de Deus	Brazil

The men's 110 metres hurdles competition of the athletics events at the 2019 Pan American Games took place between the 9 and 10 of August at the 2019 Pan American Games Athletics Stadium. The defending Pan American Games champion was David Oliver from the United States.

== Summary ==
Out of the blocks, Greggmar Swift was the first over the first hurdle with Jarret Eaton in lane 9 on the far outside a close second hitting his first. Swift and Eaton were almost stride for stride through 3 hurdles, though Eaton had flattened all of his hurdles and Gabriel Constantino, next to Swift sped into contention. At the fifth hurdle, Eaton hit it square with his foot, riding it down off balance and Swift was also slightly off balance, drifting to his left going into five, giving Constantino the lead. Eaton sidestepped six, taking himself off the track and the faster moving Constantino had a clear lead. Shane Brathwaite and Freddie Crittenden were pulling even with Swift. At the seventh everything changed, Constantino looks like he came up too close to the hurdle and tried to quick step it. He failed miserably crashing to the ground. Brathwaite and Crittenden found themselves in a neck and neck battle for the lead as Swift struggled. Dodging Constantino as he fell into his lane, Crittenden seized a slight advantage over 9 and 10, but Brathwaite was faster on the run in to take the narrow win. Eduardo Rodrigue caught Swift at the 9th hurdle and continued in for bronze. The final two finishers Roger Iribarne and Fanor Escobar were both judged to have cleared their barriers improperly and were disqualified.

== Records ==
Prior to this competition, the existing world and Pan American Games records were as follows:

World record	Aries Merritt (USA)	12.80	Brussels, Belgium	September 7, 2012
Pan American Games record	David Oliver (USA)	13.07	Toronto, Canada	July 24, 2015

== Schedule ==
Date	Time	Round
August 9, 2019	15:30	Semifinal
August 10, 2019	14:40	Final

== Results ==
All times shown are in seconds.

KEY:	q	Fastest non-qualifiers	Q	Qualified	NR	National record	PB	Personal best	SB	Seasonal best	DQ	Disqualified

=== Semifinal ===
The heats took place on 9 August at 15:30. The results were as follows:
Qualification: First 3 in each heat (Q) and the next 2 fastest (q) advance to the Final

Rank	Heat	Name	Nationality	Time	Notes
1	2	Gabriel Constantino	Brazil	13.42	Q
2	2	Shane Brathwaite	Barbados	13.49	Q
3	1	Freddie Crittenden	United States	13.53	Q
4	1	Greggmar Swift	Barbados	13.59	Q
5	1	Eduardo de Deus	Brazil	13.63	Q
6	1	Fanor Escobar	Colombia	13.63	q
7	2	Jarret Eaton	United States	13.71	Q
8	1	Roger Iribarne	Cuba	13.79	q
9	2	Yohan Chaverra	Colombia	13.81	
10	1	Ruebin Walters	Trinidad and Tobago	13.88	SB
11	2	Jeffrey Julmis	Haiti	14.02	
12	1	Javier McFarlane	Peru	14.20	
	2	Orlando Bennett	Jamaica	DSQ	
	1	Johnathan Cabral	Canada	DNS	
	2	Eddie Lovett	Virgin Islands	DNS	

=== Final ===
The final took place on 10 August at 14:40. The results were as follows:
Wind: +1.8 m/s

Rank	Lane	Name	Nationality	Time	Notes
1st place, gold medalist(s)	7	Shane Brathwaite	Barbados	13.31	SB
2nd place, silver medalist(s)	6	Freddie Crittenden	United States	13.32	
3rd place, bronze medalist(s)	8	Eduardo de Deus	Brazil	13.48	
4	4	Greggmar Swift	Barbados	13.51	
	9	Jarret Eaton	United States	DNF	
	5	Gabriel Constantino	Brazil	DNF	
	3	Fanor Escobar	Colombia	DSQ	
	2	Roger Iribarne	Cuba	DSQ	
