= Athletics at the 2019 Pan American Games – Women's 1500 metres =

Women's 1500 metres at the 2019 Pan American Games
- Venue: Athletics Stadium
- Dates: August 9
- Competitors: 11 from 9 nations
- Winning time: 4:07.14

Medalists
Gold medal	Nikki Hiltz	United States
Silver medal	Aisha Praught-Leer	Jamaica
Bronze medal	Alexa Efraimson	United States

The women's 1500 metres competition of the athletics events at the 2019 Pan American Games took place the 9 August at the 2019 Pan American Games Athletics Stadium. The defending Pan American Games champion is Muriel Coneo from Colombia. Aisha Praught-Leer moved into marking position and that is the way the lead group held for the next lap and a half.

== Summary ==
Alexa Efraimson took the lead from the gun into the first turn, then 200 meters into the race, defending champion Muriel Coneo moved into the lead. On the penultimate backstretch, Praught moved past Coneo. Nikki Hiltz used that cue to move from the back of the pack up to Efraimson's back, immediately behind Praught. As they approached the bell, then around the turn, Hiltz moved around Efraimson and into a marking position on Praught's shoulder. Cuneo tried to stay with the leaders until 200 to go when the top 3 made a break. With 100 meters to go, Hiltz put on a burst of speed and the race was over. Efraimson tried to catch Praught for silver, but couldn't make any progress.

== Records ==
Prior to this competition, the existing world and Pan American Games records were as follows:

World record	Genzebe Dibaba (ETH)	3:50.07	Monaco	July 17, 2015
Pan American Games record	Mary Decker (USA)	4:05.70	San Juan, Puerto Rico	July 13, 1979

== Schedule ==
Date	Time	Round
August 9, 2019	17:35	Final

== Results ==
All times shown are in seconds.

KEY:	q	Fastest non-qualifiers	Q	Qualified	NR	National record	PB	Personal best	SB	Seasonal best	DQ	Disqualified

=== Final ===
The results were as follows

Rank	Name	Nationality	Time	Notes
1st place, gold medalist(s)	Nikki Hiltz	United States	4:07.14	
2nd place, silver medalist(s)	Aisha Praught-Leer	Jamaica	4:08.26	
3rd place, bronze medalist(s)	Alexa Efraimson	United States	4:08.63	
4	Laura Galván	Mexico	4:10.53	PB
5	María Pía Fernández	Uruguay	4:10.93	PB
6	Muriel Coneo	Colombia	4:11.97	SB
7	Rose Mary Almanza	Cuba	4:14.81	SB
8	July da Silva	Brazil	4:19.25	
9	Alma Cortes	Mexico	4:22.29	
10	Mariana Borelli	Argentina	4:22.50	
11	Angelin Figueroa	Puerto Rico	4:25.28	
