= Reginald Jagers III =

American athlete (born 1994)

Personal information
- Born: August 28, 1994 (age 31) Cleveland, Ohio, United States
- Education: Solon High School; Kent State University
- Height: 6 ft 2 in (188 cm)
- Weight: 260 lb (118 kg)

Sport
- Sport: Athletics
- Event: Discus throw
Medal record
Representing United States
Pan American Games
Bronze medal – third place	2019 Lima	Discus throw
Summer Universiade
Gold medal – first place	2017 Taipei	Discus throw

Reginald "Reggie" Jagers III (born August 28, 1994) is an American athlete specializing in the discus throw. He won the gold medal at the 2017 Summer Universiade.

Jagers was an All-American thrower for the Kent State Golden Flashes track and field team, finishing runner-up in the discus at the 2017 NCAA Division I Outdoor Track and Field Championships.

He set the left handed discus world record while competing at the 2018 USA Outdoor Track and Field Championships.

In 2019, he won the bronze medal at Pan American Games in Lima, Peru.

He qualified to represent the United States at the 2020 Summer Olympics and the 2024 Summer Olympics in the discus throw event.

== International competitions ==
Year	Competition	Venue	Position	Event	Notes
Representing United States
2017	Universiade	Taipei, Taiwan	1st	Discus throw	61.24 m
2019	Pan American Games	Lima, Peru	3rd	Discus throw	64.48 m
2021	Olympic Games	Tokyo, Japan	19th (q)	Discus throw	61.47 m
2025	NACAC Championships	Freeport, Bahamas	4th	Discus throw	60.46 m
2026	Pan American Championships	Medellín, Colombia	4th	Discus throw	61.89 m
