= Athletics at the 2019 Pan American Games – Men's 400 metres =

Men's 400 metres at the 2019 Pan American Games
- Venue: Athletics Stadium
- Dates: August 7–8
- Competitors: 17 from 12 nations
- Winning time: 44.83

Medalists
Gold medal	Anthony Zambrano	Colombia
Silver medal	Demish Gaye	Jamaica
Bronze medal	Justin Robinson	United States

The men's 400 metres competition of the athletics events at the 2019 Pan American Games will take place between the 7 and 8 of August at the 2019 Pan American Games Athletics Stadium. The defending Pan American Games champion is Luguelín Santos from the Dominican Republic.

== Summary ==
Demish Gaye on the outside and Bralon Taplin in the middle of the track edged out to a slight lead, but down the backstretch it was almost an even stagger across the track. Through the turn, Taplin started to lose ground putting Gaye into the lead coming off the turn. Really as they hit the straightaway, Gaye's one step forward and Anthony Zambrano's one step back were the only thing that interrupted a shoulder to shoulder wall across the track. On the run for home, Taplin and defending champion Luguelín Santos went out the back. Gaye continue to hold the edge as the others struggled. The only one to make a serious forward move was Zambrano, who gained all the way past Gaye to take the win. 17 year old Justin Robinson picked up bronze.

== Records ==
Prior to this competition, the existing world and Pan American Games records were as follows:

World record	Wayde van Niekerk (RSA)	43.03	Rio de Janeiro, Brazil	August 14, 2016
Pan American Games record	Ronnie Ray (USA)	44.45	Havana, Cuba	October 18, 1975

== Schedule ==
Date	Time	Round
August 7, 2019	15:40	Semifinal
August 8, 2019	17:20	Final

== Results ==
All times shown are in seconds.

KEY:	q	Fastest non-qualifiers	Q	Qualified	NR	National record	PB	Personal best	SB	Seasonal best	DQ	Disqualified

=== Semifinal ===
Qualification: First 3 in each heat (Q) and next 2 fastest (q) qualified for the final. The results were as follows:

Rank	Heat	Name	Nationality	Time	Notes
1	2	Anthony Zambrano	Colombia	45.13	Q
2	1	Jhon Perlaza	Colombia	45.21	Q
3	1	Justin Robinson	United States	45.38	Q
4	2	Bralon Taplin	Grenada	45.38	Q
5	2	Demish Gaye	Jamaica	45.47	Q
6	1	Jonathan Jones	Barbados	45.60	Q
7	2	Wilbert London	United States	45.78	q
8	1	Luguelín Santos	Dominican Republic	45.88	q, SB
9	2	Dwight St. Hillaire	Trinidad and Tobago	46.04	
10	1	Yoandys Lescay	Cuba	46.60	SB
11	2	Lidio Feliz	Dominican Republic	46.76	
12	1	Machel Cedenio	Trinidad and Tobago	46.77	
13	1	Terry Thomas	Jamaica	46.97	
14	2	Kelvis Padrino	Venezuela	46.99	
15	2	Nery Brenes	Costa Rica	47.48	SB
16	1	Brandon Parris	Saint Vincent and the Grenadines	48.14	
	2	Philip Osei	Canada	DNF	

=== Final ===
The results were as follows:

Rank	Lane	Name	Nationality	Time	Notes
1st place, gold medalist(s)	7	Anthony Zambrano	Colombia	44.83	
2nd place, silver medalist(s)	8	Demish Gaye	Jamaica	44.94	
3rd place, bronze medalist(s)	5	Justin Robinson	United States	45.07	
4	2	Wilbert London	United States	45.22	
5	9	Jonathan Jones	Barbados	45.35	
6	4	Jhon Perlaza	Colombia	45.37	
7	3	Luguelín Santos	Dominican Republic	45.73	SB
8	6	Bralon Taplin	Grenada	46.01	
