= Athletics at the 2019 Pan American Games – Men's marathon =

Men's marathon at the 2019 Pan American Games
- Venue: Parque Kennedy
- Dates: July 27
- Competitors: 18 from 14 nations
- Winning time: 2:09:31

Medalists
Gold medal	Cristhian Pacheco	Peru
Silver medal	José Luis Santana	Mexico
Bronze medal	Juan Joel Pacheco	Mexico

The men's marathon competition of the athletics events at the 2019 Pan American Games took place on the 27th July on a temporary circuit around the Parque Kennedy in Lima, Peru. The defending Pan American Games champion is Richer Pérez of Cuba.

== Records ==
World record	Eliud Kipchoge (KEN)	2:01:39	Berlin, Germany	September 16, 2018
Pan American Games record	Jorge González (PUR)	2:12:43	Caracas, Venezuela	August 28, 1983

== Schedule ==
Date	Time	Round
July 27, 2019	9:30	Final

== Abbreviations ==
- All times shown are in hours:minutes:seconds

KEY:	q	Fastest non-qualifiers	Q	Qualified	NR	National record	PB	Personal best	SB	Seasonal best	DQ	Disqualified

== Results ==
Rank	Athlete	Nation	Time	Notes
1st place, gold medalist(s)	Cristhian Pacheco	Peru	2:09:31	GR
2nd place, silver medalist(s)	José Luis Santana	Mexico	2:10:54	PB
3rd place, bronze medalist(s)	Juan Joel Pacheco	Mexico	2:12:10	
4	Augustus Maiyo	United States	2:12:25	PB
5	Derlis Ayala	Paraguay	2:12:54	NR
6	Willy Canchanya	Peru	2:13:22	
7	Nicolás Cuestas	Uruguay	2:13:59	PB
8	Segundo Jami	Ecuador	2:14:14	
9	Miguel Ángel Barzola	Argentina	2:17:18	
10	Williams Julajuj	Guatemala	2:17:21	PB
11	Wellington Bezerra da Silva	Brazil	2:17:33	
12	Eduardo Garcia	Virgin Islands	2:19:12	
13	Mariano Mastromarino	Argentina	2:20:15	
14	Aaron Braun	United States	2:21:55	
15	John Tello	Colombia	2:27:15	
16	Juan Carlos Trujillo	Guatemala	2:28:18	
	Leslie Encina	Chile	DNF	
	Jeison Suárez	Colombia	DNF	

Report:
