= Athletics at the 2019 Pan American Games – Women's 400 metres =

Women's 400 metres at the 2019 Pan American Games
- Venue: Athletics Stadium
- Dates: August 7 – August 8
- Competitors: 17 from 13 nations
- Winning time: 50.73

Medalists
| Gold medal | Shericka Jackson | Jamaica |
| Silver medal | Paola Morán | Mexico |
| Bronze medal | Courtney Okolo | United States |

The women's 400 metres competition of the athletics events at the 2019 Pan American Games will take place between the 7 and 8 of August at the 2019 Pan American Games Athletics Stadium. The defending Pan American Games champion is Kendall Baisden from the United States.

== Summary ==
Right out of the blocks, Shericka Jackson was moving ahead of the stagger. Just inside of her, Paola Morán was trying to key off of her. Down the backstretch the center lanes of the track, including Courtney Okolo were moving ahead. The separation continued all the way to the finish.

== Records ==
Prior to this competition, the existing world and Pan American Games records were as follows:

| World record | Marita Koch (GDR) | 47.60 | Canberra, Australia | October 6, 1985 |
| Pan American Games record | Ana Quirot (CUB) | 49.61 | Havana, Cuba | August 5, 1991 |

== Schedule ==
| Date | Time | Round |
|---|---|---|
| August 7, 2019 | 15:20 | Semifinal |
| August 8, 2019 | 17:10 | Final |

== Results ==
All times shown are in seconds.

| KEY: | q | Fastest non-qualifiers | Q | Qualified | NR | National record | PB | Personal best | SB | Seasonal best | DQ | Disqualified |

=== Semifinal ===
Qualification: First 3 in each heat (Q) and next 2 fastest (q) qualified for the final. The results were as follows:

| Rank | Heat | Name | Nationality | Time | Notes |
|---|---|---|---|---|---|
| 1 | 2 | Paola Morán | Mexico | 51.58 | Q |
| 2 | 1 | Shericka Jackson | Jamaica | 51.99 | Q |
| 3 | 1 | Roxana Gómez | Cuba | 52.04 | Q |
| 4 | 1 | Jaide Stepter | United States | 52.17 | Q |
| 5 | 2 | Courtney Okolo | United States | 52.31 | Q |
| 6 | 2 | Sada Williams | Barbados | 52.39 | Q |
| 7 | 1 | Kyra Constantine | Canada | 52.92 | q |
| 8 | 1 | Aliyah Abrams | Guyana | 52.95 | q |
| 9 | 2 | Natassha McDonald | Canada | 53.15 | |
| 10 | 1 | Jennifer Padilla | Colombia | 53.20 | |
| 11 | 2 | Lina Licona | Colombia | 53.53 | |
| 12 | 1 | Noelia Martinez | Argentina | 53.96 | |
| 13 | 2 | Maria MacKenna | Chile | 54.11 | |
| 14 | 2 | Anastasia Le-Roy | Jamaica | 54.18 | |
| 15 | 2 | Ashley Kelly | British Virgin Islands | 54.42 | |
| 16 | 1 | Kanika Beckles | Grenada | 54.64 | |
| 17 | 1 | Maitte Torres | Peru | 54.66 | |

=== Final ===
The results were as follows:

| Rank | Lane | Name | Nationality | Time | Notes |
|---|---|---|---|---|---|
| 1st place, gold medalist(s) | 5 | Shericka Jackson | Jamaica | 50.73 | |
| 2nd place, silver medalist(s) | 4 | Paola Morán | Mexico | 51.02 | PB |
| 3rd place, bronze medalist(s) | 6 | Courtney Okolo | United States | 51.22 | |
| 4 | 7 | Roxana Gómez | Cuba | 51.65 | SB |
| 5 | 3 | Kyra Constantine | Canada | 51.99 | |
| 6 | 9 | Sada Williams | Barbados | 52.25 | |
| 7 | 2 | Aliyah Abrams | Guyana | 52.63 | |
| | 8 | Jaide Stepter | United States | DSQ | |
