= Tissanna Hickling =

Jamaican athlete (born 1998)

Tissanna Hanson
Personal information
- Nationality: Jamaica
- Born: 7 January 1998 (age 28)

Sport
- Sport: Athletics
- Event: Long jump
- Coached by: Kerry Lee Ricketts

Achievements and titles
- Personal best: Long jump: 6.85 m (2023)
Medal record
Women's athletics
Representing Jamaica
Athletics World Cup
Silver medal – second place	2018 London	4×100 m relay
Bronze medal – third place	2018 London	Long jump
Pan Am Games
Bronze medal – third place	2019 Lima	Long jump
NACAC Championships
Bronze medal – third place	2018 Toronto	Long jump
Pan American U20 Championships
Silver medal – second place	2017 Trujillo	Long jump
CARIFTA Games U20
Gold medal – first place	2017 Willemstad	Long jump
Silver medal – second place	2017 Willemstad	Triple jump
Bronze medal – third place	2016 St. George's	Long jump
Bronze medal – third place	2016 St. George's	Triple jump

Tissanna Hanson (born 7 January 1998) is a Jamaican athlete specialising in the long jump.

== Biography ==
Hickling attended St. Jago High School located in St. Catherine, Jamaica.

== Career ==
She represented her country at the 2019 World Championships in Doha without reaching the final. Earlier that year, she won a bronze medal competing in Athletics at the 2019 Pan American Games.

She had qualified to represent Jamaica at the 2020 Summer Olympics.

Her personal best in the event was 6.82 metres (+1.7 m/s) set in Kingston in 2019).

== International competitions ==
Year	Competition	Venue	Position	Event	Notes
Representing Jamaica
2015	World Youth Championships	Cali, Colombia	14th (q)	Long jump	5.85 m
2016	CARIFTA Games (U20)	St. George's, Grenada	3rd	Long jump	5.84 m
2016	CARIFTA Games (U20)	St. George's, Grenada	3rd	Triple jump	12.17 m
2016	NACAC U23 Championships	San Salvador, El Salvador	6th	Long jump	5.70 m
2016	NACAC U23 Championships	San Salvador, El Salvador	5th	Triple jump	12.68 m
2017	CARIFTA Games (U20)	Willemstad, Curaçao	1st	4 × 100 m relay	44.83 s
2017	CARIFTA Games (U20)	Willemstad, Curaçao	1st	Long jump	6.22 m
2017	CARIFTA Games (U20)	Willemstad, Curaçao	2nd	Triple jump	12.87 m
2017	Pan American U20 Championships	Trujillo, Peru	2nd	Long jump	6.36 m
2017	Pan American U20 Championships	Trujillo, Peru	6th	Triple jump	12.85 m
2018	World Cup	London, United Kingdom	2nd	4 × 100 m relay	42.60 s
2018	World Cup	London, United Kingdom	3rd	Long jump	6.47 m
2018	NACAC Championships	Toronto, Canada	3rd	Long jump	6.38
2019	Pan American Games	Lima, Peru	3rd	Long jump	6.59 m
2019	World Championships	Doha, Qatar	16th (q)	Long jump	6.49 m
2021	Olympic Games	Tokyo, Japan	25th (q)	Long jump	6.19 m
2023	World Championships	Budapest, Hungary	30th (q)	Long jump	6.29 m
2024	World Indoor Championships	Glasgow, United Kingdom	10th	Long jump	6.43 m

== Personal Life ==
Tissanna is married with one child.
