= Athletics at the 2019 Pan American Games – Women's 800 metres =

Women's 800 metres at the 2019 Pan American Games
- Venue: Athletics Stadium
- Dates: August 6 – August 7
- Competitors: 14 from 10 nations
- Winning time: 2:01.26

Medalists
Gold medal	Natoya Goule	Jamaica
Silver medal	Rose Mary Almanza	Cuba
Bronze medal	Deborah Rodríguez	Uruguay

The women's 800 metres competition of the athletics events at the 2019 Pan American Games will take place between the 6 and 7 of August at the 2019 Pan American Games Athletics Stadium. The defending Pan American Games champion is Melissa Bishop from the Canada.

== Summary ==
From the beginning of the final, Rose Mary Almanza asserted herself, hitting the break line first and pushing out to the front of the tight pack. For most of the first lap, Sade Sealy sat immediately on Almanza's outer shoulder until the first pass down the home straight, when Natoya Goule moved forward into the outer position, briefly poking into the lead at the bell. Almanza would not let Goule get far enough ahead to move in. Sealy had to drop directly behind Almanza, with Déborah Rodríguez boxing her from the outside. At the beginning of the final turn, Goule tried to accelerate around Almanza, but was held to the outside through the entire turn. Coming off the turn, Almanza accelerated and gained a slight advantage, the two battling almost shoulder to shoulder down the home straight. 50 metres to go, Almanza's face began to show strain, Goule gained the advantage and went on for the win. Fighting as she tied up, Almanza strained to hold off the fast closing Rodríguez, making one last jerk to get her torso over the finish line .02 ahead to retain silver

== Records ==
Prior to this competition, the existing world and Pan American Games records were as follows:

World record	Jarmila Kratochvilova (CZE)	1:53.28	Munich, Germany	July 26, 1983
Pan American Games record	Ana Quirot (CUB)	1:58.71	Havana, Cuba	August 8, 1991

== Schedule ==
Date	Time	Round
August 6, 2019	17:07	Semifinal
August 7, 2019	16:00	Final

== Results ==
All times shown are in seconds.

KEY:	q	Fastest non-qualifiers	Q	Qualified	NR	National record	PB	Personal best	SB	Seasonal best	DQ	Disqualified

=== Semifinal ===
Qualification: First 3 in each heat (Q) and next 2 fastest (q) qualified for the final. The results were as follows:

Rank	Heat	Name	Nationality	Time	Notes
1	2	Natoya Goule	Jamaica	2:02.68	Q
2	2	Sade Sealy	Barbados	2:03.23	Q, PB
3	2	Alena Brooks	Trinidad and Tobago	2:03.79	Q
4	2	Lindsey Butterworth	Canada	2:03.82	q
5	1	Rose Mary Almanza	Cuba	2:05.25	Q
6	2	Mariela Luisa Real	Mexico	2:05.73	q
7	1	Sonia Gaskin	Barbados	2:05.85	Q
8	2	Johana Arrieta	Colombia	2:06.00	
9	1	Déborah Rodríguez	Uruguay	2:06.30	Q
10	1	Alethia Marrero	Colombia	2:06.87	
11	2	Athing Mu	United States	2:07.30	
12	1	Andrea Calderón	Ecuador	2:08.49	
13	1	Jazmine Fray	Jamaica	2:10.14	
	1	Maïté Bouchard	Canada	DNF	

=== Final ===
The results were as follows:

Rank	Name	Nationality	Time	Notes
1st place, gold medalist(s)	Natoya Goule	Jamaica	2:01.26	
2nd place, silver medalist(s)	Rose Mary Almanza	Cuba	2:01.64	
3rd place, bronze medalist(s)	Déborah Rodríguez	Uruguay	2:01.66	SB
4	Sade Sealy	Barbados	2:02.23	NR
5	Lindsey Butterworth	Canada	2:02.68	
6	Alena Brooks	Trinidad and Tobago	2:02.75	
7	Mariela Luisa Real	Mexico	2:04.56	
8	Sonia Gaskin	Barbados	2:05.68	
