= Rubén Caballero =

Chilean-born engineer (born 1967)

- Born: December 20, 1967 (age 58); Santiago, Chile
- Citizenship: Spanish–Canadian–American
- Education: Collège Laval; Collège Jean-de-Brébeuf; École Polytechnique de Montréal (B.Eng., 1991); New Mexico State University (M.Sc., 1996); Polytechnique Montréal (Honorary Doctorate, 2019)
- Occupations: Engineer, inventor, technology executive
- Known for: Founding leader of Apple’s iPhone hardware team; Founder of Apple’s Wireless Design & Technology group
- Children: Two

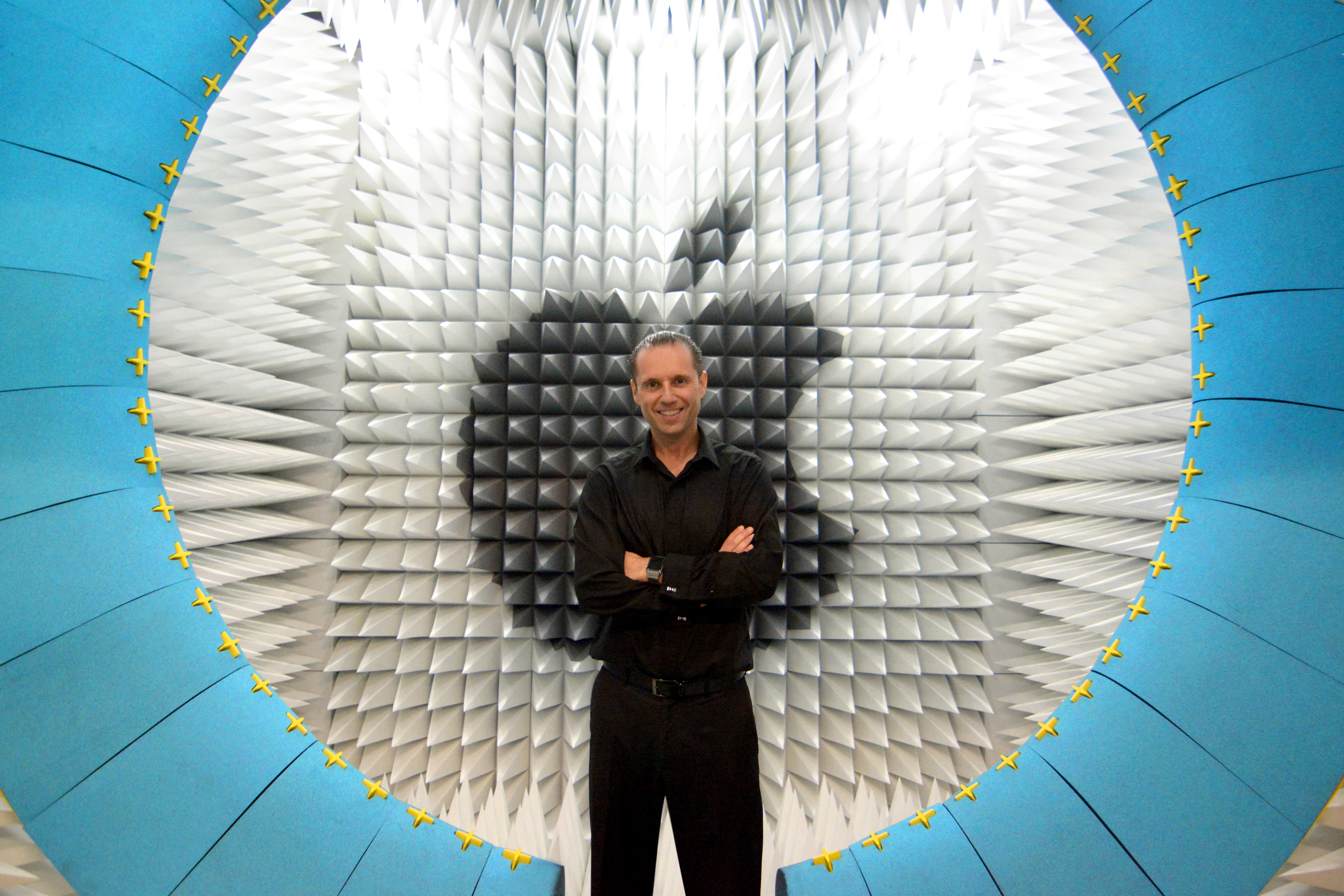
Rubén Caballero - Apple Wireless R&D Lab in Tantau 3, Infinite Loop, Cupertino, California on 03 March 2015

Rubén Caballero (born December 20, 1967) is a Chilean-born Spanish–Canadian–American engineer, inventor, technology executive and former Canadian Airforce Captain. He is one of the founding leaders of Apple’s iPhone hardware team and the founder of its Wireless Design & Technology group. Caballero later served as Corporate Vice President of Engineering at Microsoft, where he worked on HoloLens and mixed-reality.

== Career ==
=== Canadian military ===
In 1988, Caballero joined the Canadian military, where he served for 13 years as an Aerospace Engineering Officer. He was promoted to Captain in 1994.

=== Apple (2005–2019) ===
Caballero joined Apple in 2005, working initially with Tony Fadell. He played a central role in the development of the first-generation iPhone, later contributing to the design and evolution of other hardware products, including the iPad, Mac computers, Apple Watch, AirPods, Apple TV, and AirPort.

By 2019, Caballero was Vice President of Engineering at Apple, where he led the company’s 5G wireless technology efforts. He departed the company that year.

=== Microsoft (2020–2024) ===
In April 2020, Caballero joined Microsoft as Corporate Vice President of Engineering within its Devices & Technology division. His role focused on augmented and mixed reality, artificial intelligence, and advanced hardware development. He contributed to projects including the HoloLens mixed reality headset.

=== Humane and Hewlett-Packard (2024–present) ===
In June 2024, Caballero joined Humane, an artificial intelligence startup, as Chief of Engineering and Strategy. From 2019 to 2021, Caballero served as the Chief Wireless Strategist at Keyssa Inc.
