= Athletics at the 2019 Pan American Games – Women's shot put =

Women's shot put at the 2019 Pan American Games
- Venue: Athletics Stadium
- Dates: August 9
- Competitors: 11 from 8 nations
- Winning distance: 19.55

Medalists
Gold medal	Danniel Thomas-Dodd	Jamaica
Silver medal	Brittany Crew	Canada
Bronze medal	Jessica Ramsey	United States

The women's shot put competition of the athletics events at the 2019 Pan American Games took place on the 9th of August at the 2019 Pan American Games Athletics Stadium. The defending Pan American Games champion was Cleopatra Borel from Trinidad and Tobago.

== Records ==
Prior to this competition, the existing world and Pan American Games records were as follows:

World record	Natalya Lisovskaya (URS)	22.63	Moscow, Soviet Union	June 7, 1987
Pan American Games record	María Elena Sarría (CUB)	19.34	Caracas, Venezuela	August 28, 1983

== Schedule ==
Date	Time	Round
August 9, 2019	16:20	Final

== Results ==
All distances shown are in meters.

KEY:	q	Fastest non-qualifiers	Q	Qualified	NR	National record	PB	Personal best	SB	Seasonal best	DQ	Disqualified

=== Final ===
The final took place on 9 August at 16:20. The results were as follows:

Rank	Name	Nationality	#1	#2	#3	#4	#5	#6	Time	Notes
1st place, gold medalist(s)	Danniel Thomas-Dodd	Jamaica	18.62	x	19.16	18.78	x	19.55	19.55	GR, NR
2nd place, silver medalist(s)	Brittany Crew	Canada	17.70	18.24	17.89	x	18.47	19.07	19.07	NR
3rd place, bronze medalist(s)	Jessica Ramsey	United States	18.00	18.01	17.46	x	18.88	19.01	19.01	SB
4	Daniella Hill	United States	17.31	17.99	x	x	18.06	17.99	18.06	
5	Yaniuvis López	Cuba	17.60	17.66	17.99	17.60	17.81	17.59	17.99	
6	Sarah Mitton	Canada	17.02	16.92	17.62	17.21	x	17.31	17.62	
7	Lloydricia Cameron	Jamaica	x	16.31	16.60	16.70	17.57	17.25	17.57	SB
8	Cleopatra Borel	Trinidad and Tobago	x	16.97	16.57	17.04	17.37	17.36	17.37	
9	Portious Warren	Trinidad and Tobago	16.44	x	16.55				16.55	
10	Ahymara Espinoza	Venezuela	15.79	16.49	x				16.49	
11	Ivana Gallardo	Chile	14.96	16.43	x				16.43	
