= Athletics at the 2019 Pan American Games – Men's discus throw =

Men's discus throw at the 2019 Pan American Games
- Venue: Athletics Stadium
- Dates: August 6
- Competitors: 10 from 8 nations
- Winning distance: 67.68 m

Medalists
Gold medal	Fedrick Dacres	Jamaica
Silver medal	Traves Smikle	Jamaica
Bronze medal	Reginald Jagers III	United States

The men's discus throw competition of the athletics events at the 2019 Pan American Games took place on the 6th of August at the 2019 Pan American Games Athletics Stadium. The defending Pan American Games champion is Fedrick Dacres from Jamaica.

== Records ==
Prior to this competition, the existing world and Pan American Games records were as follows:

World record	Jürgen Schult (GDR)	74.08 m	Neubrandenburg, East Germany	June 6, 1986
Pan American Games record	Luis Delis (CUB)	67.32 m	Caracas, Venezuela	August 25, 1983

== Schedule ==
Date	Time	Round
August 6, 2019	15:30	Final

== Results ==
All times shown are in meters.

KEY:	q	Fastest non-qualifiers	Q	Qualified	NR	National record	PB	Personal best	SB	Seasonal best	DQ	Disqualified

=== Final ===
The results were as follows:

Rank	Name	Nationality	#1	#2	#3	#4	#5	#6	Mark	Notes
1st place, gold medalist(s)	Fedrick Dacres	Jamaica	66.14	67.68	x	65.02	65.07	x	67.68	GR
2nd place, silver medalist(s)	Traves Smikle	Jamaica	62.96	x	64.23	63.92	65.02	63.48	65.02	
3rd place, bronze medalist(s)	Reginald Jagers III	United States	x	64.48	x	x	x	x	64.48	
4	Jorge Fernández	Cuba	63.21	64.24	63.73	63.58	62.42	62.33	64.24	
5	Mauricio Ortega	Colombia	58.69	61.15	59.91	x	x	x	61.15	
6	Juan José Caicedo	Ecuador	56.92	57.81	x	x	x	x	57.81	
7	Josh Boateng	Grenada	56.92	x	55.31	55.88	55.20	56.61	56.92	
8	Abel Vest	Haiti	x	47.26	x	x	48.76	48.39	48.76	
	Brian Williams II	United States	x	x	x				NM	
	Claudio Romero	Chile	x	x	x				NM	
