= Fedrick Dacres =

Jamaican discus thrower (born 1994)

Personal information
- Born: 28 February 1994 (age 32) Kingston, Jamaica
- Height: 1.91 m (6 ft 3 in)
- Weight: 104 kg (229 lb)

Sport
- Country: Jamaica
- Sport: Track and field
- Events: Shot put Discus throw

Achievements and titles
- Personal bests: SP (7.26 kg): 20.46 m (Kingston 2017); DT (2 kg): 70.78 m (Rabat 2019) Former NR
Medal record
Men's track and field
Representing Jamaica
World Championships
Silver medal – second place	2019 Doha	Discus throw
Commonwealth Games
Gold medal – first place	2018 Gold Coast	Discus throw
Silver medal – second place	2026 Glasgow	Discus throw
Pan American Games
Gold medal – first place	2015 Toronto	Discus throw
Gold medal – first place	2019 Lima	Discus throw
Bronze medal – third place	2023 Santiago	Discus throw
NACAC Championships
Gold medal – first place	2018 Toronto	Discus throw
Gold medal – first place	2025 Freeport	Discus throw
Silver medal – second place	2022 Freeport	Discus throw
Diamond League
First place	2018	Discus Throw
Third place	2021 Zurich	Discus Throw
Third place	2019 Brussels	Discus Throw
World Junior Championships
Gold medal – first place	2012 Barcelona	Discus throw
Pan American Junior Championships
Bronze medal – third place	2011 Miramar	Discus throw
CAC Junior Championships
Gold medal – first place	2012 San Salvador	Discus throw
Silver medal – second place	2010 Santo Domingo	Discus throw
CARIFTA Games (Junior)
Gold medal – first place	2012 Hamilton	Discus throw
World Youth Championships
Gold medal – first place	2011 Lille	Discus throw
CARIFTA Games (Youth)
Gold medal – first place	2010 George Town	Discus throw
Representing Americas
Continental Cup
Gold medal – first place	2018 Ostrava	Discus throw

Fedrick Dacres (born 28 February 1994) is a Jamaican discus thrower.

== Early Life ==
He began his throwing career as a student at Calabar High School in Jamaica along with other accomplished throwers such as Chad Wright and Traves Smikle, under the guidance of former Calabar athlete coach Julian Robinson.

== Career ==
He won a gold medal at the 2011 World Youth Championships in Athletics, becoming the first Jamaican discus thrower ever to do so. He went on to win a gold medal at the 2012 World Junior Championships in Athletics, also becoming the first Jamaican discus thrower ever to do so.

Dacres participated in the boys' discus throw at the 2010 Summer Youth Olympics.

He has qualified to represent Jamaica at the 2020 Summer Olympics.
