= Andre Ewers =

Jamaican sprinter

Personal information
- Nationality: Jamaican
- Born: 7 June 1995 (age 30)

Sport
- Sport: Athletics
- Event: Sprinting

Andre Ewers (born 7 June 1995) is a Jamaican athlete. He competed in the men's 200 metres event at the 2019 World Athletics Championships.
