= Kemar Mowatt =

Jamaican hurdler

Personal information
- Nationality: Jamaican
- Born: 12 March 1995 (age 31)

Sport
- Sport: Track and field
- Event: 400m hurdles
- College team: Arkansas Razorbacks
Medal record
Pan American Games
Bronze medal – third place	2019 Lima	400 m hurdles

Kemar Mowatt (born 12 March 1995) is a professional Jamaican hurdler.

== Personal life ==
In 2018 he became a graduate of the University of Arkansas.

== Career ==
He was a 2 time SEC champion, and a double time NCAA finalist, and a medalist at his national championship in Jamaica in 2017 and 2018. Without any previous merits at the international level, he finished fourth at the 2017 World Championships. He won the 2019 Jamaican 400m hurdles National Championships.

His personal best time is 48.49 seconds, achieved in June 2017 in Eugene, Oregon.

He qualified to represent Jamaica at the 2020 Summer Olympics where he reached the semi-finals.
