= Traves Smikle =

Jamaican discus thrower (born 1992)

Personal information
- Full name: Traves Jamie Smikle
- Born: 7 May 1992 (age 34) Kingston, Jamaica
- Height: 1.91 m (6 ft 3 in)
- Weight: 123 kg (271 lb)

Sport
- Country: Jamaica
- Sport: Athletics
- Event: Discus throw
- Coached by: Julian Robinson
Medal record
Men's athletics
Representing Jamaica
Pan American Games
Silver medal – second place	2019 Lima	Discus throw
Commonwealth Games
Silver medal – second place	2018 Gold Coast	Discus throw
Bronze medal – third place	2022 Birmingham	Discus throw
NACAC Championships
Gold medal – first place	2022 Freeport	Discus throw
Silver medal – second place	2018 Toronto	Discus throw
Central American and Caribbean Games
Bronze medal – third place	2018 Barranquilla	Discus throw
Pan American Junior Championships
Gold medal – first place	2011 Miramar	Discus throw
Bronze medal – third place	2009 Port of Spain	Discus throw

Traves Jamie Smikle (born 7 May 1992) is a Jamaican athlete. He competed for Jamaica in discus at the 2012 Summer Olympics, the 2020 Summer Olympics, and the 2024 Summer Olympics. He is a five time National Champion winning the Jamaican National Senior Championships (Trials) in 2011, 2012, 2019, 2022 and 2023. He has represented Jamaica at the World Championships in 2017, 2019 and 2022.
