= Athletics at the 2022 Commonwealth Games – Men's 200 metres =

Men's 200 metres at the 2022 Commonwealth Games
- Venue: Alexander Stadium
- Dates: 4 August (first round); 5 August (semifinals); 6 August (final)
- Competitors: 58 from 34 nations
- Winning time: 19.80

Medalists
gold medal	Jereem Richards	Trinidad and Tobago
silver medal	Zharnel Hughes	England
bronze medal	Joseph Amoah	Ghana

The men's 200 metres at the 2022 Commonwealth Games, as part of the athletics programme, took place in the Alexander Stadium in Birmingham on 4-6 August 2022.

The winning margin was 0.32 seconds which as of 2024 is the greatest winning margin in the men's 200 metres at these games.

== Records ==
Prior to this competition, the existing world and Games records were as follows:

World record	Usain Bolt (JAM)	19.19	Berlin, Germany	20 August 2009
Commonwealth record	Usain Bolt (JAM)	19.19	Berlin, Germany	20 August 2009
Games record	Frankie Fredericks (NAM)	19.97	Victoria, Canada	26 August 1994

== Schedule ==
The schedule was as follows:

Date	Time	Round
Thursday 4 August 2022	11:45	First round
Friday 5 August 2022	19:09	Semifinals
Saturday 6 August 2022	21:18	Final

All times are British Summer Time (UTC+1)

== Results ==
=== First round ===
First 2 in each heat (Q) and the next 8 fastest (q) advance to the Semifinals.

Wind:

- Heat 1: +2.1 m/s
- Heat 2: +0.2 m/s
- Heat 3: +3.4 m/s
- Heat 4: +2.7 m/s
- Heat 5: +1.4 m/s
- Heat 6: +0.1 m/s
- Heat 7: +0.8 m/s
- Heat 8: 0.0 m/s

Rank	Heat	Lane	Name	Nation	Result	Notes
1	3	4	Zharnel Hughes	England	20.30	Q
2	1	7	Emmanuel Eseme	Cameroon	20.44	Q
3	5	3	Joseph Amoah	Ghana	20.58	Q
4	4	5	Jereem Richards	Trinidad and Tobago	20.68	Q
5	7	2	Dan Asamba	Kenya	20.76	Q
6	4	3	Sibusiso Matsenjwa	Eswatini	20.79	Q
7	3	9	Mike Nyang'au	Kenya	20.82	Q
8	2	1	Brendon Rodney	Canada	20.84	Q
9	1	4	Dwight St. Hillaire	Trinidad and Tobago	20.85	Q
10	6	7	Adam Gemili	England	20.92	Q
11	5	6	Kyle Greaux	Trinidad and Tobago	21.01	Q
12	8	4	Shajar Abbas	Pakistan	21.12 [.120]	Q
12	1	3	Ifeanyi Emmanuel Ojeli	Nigeria	21.12 [.120]	q
14	7	8	Russel Taib	Malaysia	21.13	Q
15	4	4	Warren Hazel	Saint Kitts and Nevis	21.17	q
16	2	2	Udodi Onwuzurike	Nigeria	21.18	Q
17	6	2	Kadrian Goldson	Jamaica	21.19 [.188]	Q
18	8	5	Delan Edwin	Saint Lucia	21.19 [.190]	Q
19	6	3	Nadale Buntin	Saint Kitts and Nevis	21.22 [.213]	q
20	5	8	Lenyn Leonce	Saint Lucia	21.22 [.217]	q
21	1	9	Darion Skerritt	Antigua and Barbuda	21.24	q
22	4	6	Ibrahim Bangura	Sierra Leone	21.28 [.276]	q
23	7	6	Alaba Akintola	Nigeria	21.28 [.278]	q
24	5	5	Hesborn Ochieng	Kenya	21.30	q
25	2	3	Abdul-Rasheed Saminu	Ghana	21.32	PB
26	6	5	Zachary Saunders	Jersey	21.35	PB
27	1	5	Akeem Stewart	Guyana	21.42	
28	6	4	Stern Noel Liffa	Malawi	21.43	SB
29	7	3	Jeremy Dodson	Samoa	21.46	
30	3	7	Alieu Joof	The Gambia	21.49	
31	7	4	Denzel Adem	Seychelles	21.51	PB
32	4	2	Sengan Jobe	The Gambia	21.53	
33	6	6	Joe Chadwick	Guernsey	21.54	PB
34	6	8	Julius Morris	Montserrat	21.57	SB
35	2	8	Raphael Ngaguele Mberlina	Cameroon	21.60	
36	8	8	Leroy Kamau	Papua New Guinea	21.67	
37	3	6	Reuben Rainer Lee	Singapore	21.72 [.714]	
38	8	6	Adama Jammeh	The Gambia	21.72 [.719]	
39	8	7	Noelex Holder	Guyana	21.77	=SB
40	4	7	Jabari Michael-Khensu	Saint Vincent and the Grenadines	21.81	
41	7	5	Sean Crowie	Saint Helena	21.94	
42	2	5	Troy Mason	Grenada	21.96	
43	3	8	Benele Dlamini	Eswatini	22.17	
44	2	6	Arinze Chance	Guyana	22.22	
45	2	7	Hassan Saaid	Maldives	22.32	SB
46	5	9	Xander Ho Ann Heng	Singapore	22.37	PB
47	3	3	Johnny Key	Samoa	22.38	
48	5	7	Jonathan Dende	Papua New Guinea	22.41	PB
49	3	2	Md Rakibu Hasan	Bangladesh	22.46	
50	5	4	Farook Mponda	Malawi	22.61	
51	8	3	Saymon Rijo	Anguilla	22.66	PB
52	1	2	Craig Gill	Gibraltar	22.74	
53	1	8	Deshawn Wilkins	Montserrat	23.12	
54	3	5	Obediah Timbaci	Vanuatu	23.45	
55	8	4	Sanjay Weekes	Montserrat	23.50	
56	7	7	James Mebupe	Solomon Islands	23.56	
57	1	6	Aiden Yon-Stevens	Saint Helena	23.70	
	4	8	William Hunt	Samoa	DQ	TR 17.3.1
	5	2	Jireh Agege	Nauru	DNS	

=== Semifinals ===
First 2 in each heat (Q) and the next 2 fastest (q) advance to the Final.

Wind:

- Heat 1: +2.1 m/s
- Heat 2: +1.9 m/s
- Heat 3: +0.1 m/s

Rank	Heat	Lane	Name	Nation	Result	Notes
1	1	6	Zharnel Hughes	England	20.32	Q
2	3	5	Jereem Richards	Trinidad and Tobago	20.40	Q
3	3	7	Joseph Amoah	Ghana	20.51	Q
4	2	8	Udodi Onwuzurike	Nigeria	20.59	Q
5	1	7	Brendon Rodney	Canada	20.68	Q
6	2	4	Emmanuel Eseme	Cameroon	20.69	Q
7	3	4	Sibusiso Matsenjwa	Eswatini	20.81	q, SB
8	1	5	Shajar Abbas	Pakistan	20.89	q
9	3	6	Mike Nyang'au	Kenya	20.90	
10	1	4	Kyle Greaux	Trinidad and Tobago	20.91	
11	2	7	Dwight St. Hillaire	Trinidad and Tobago	20.95	
12	2	6	Adam Gemili	England	20.97	
13	2	5	Dan Asamba	Kenya	20.99	
14	2	9	Kadrian Goldson	Jamaica	21.13	
15	1	2	Alaba Akintola	Nigeria	21.16	
16	3	8	Delan Edwin	Saint Lucia	21.32 [.316]	
17	1	8	Russel Taib	Malaysia	21.32 [.317]	
18	3	9	Ifeanyi Emmanuel Ojeli	Nigeria	21.39	
19	1	9	Warren Hazel	Saint Kitts and Nevis	21.40	
20	2	2	Darion Skerritt	Antigua and Barbuda	21.41	
21	3	2	Nadale Buntin	Saint Kitts and Nevis	21.42	
22	2	3	Lenyn Leonce	Saint Lucia	21.53	
23	1	3	Hesborn Ochieng	Kenya	21.56	
24	3	3	Ibrahim Bangura	Sierra Leone	21.62	SB

=== Final ===
The medals were determined in the final.

Wind: +1.1m/s

Rank	Lane	Name	Result	Notes
1st place, gold medalist(s)	7	Jereem Richards (TTO)	19.80	GR, PB
2nd place, silver medalist(s)	4	Zharnel Hughes (ENG)	20.12	SB
3rd place, bronze medalist(s)	5	Joseph Amoah (GHA)	20.49	
4	8	Emmanuel Eseme (CMR)	20.61	SB
5	9	Brendon Rodney (CAN)	20.65	
6	6	Udodi Onwuzurike (NGR)	20.76	
7	2	Sibusiso Matsenjwa (SWZ)	20.92	
8	3	Shajar Abbas (PAK)	21.16	
