= Athletics at the 2022 Commonwealth Games – Men's 4 × 100 metres relay =

Men's 4 × 100 metres relay at the 2022 Commonwealth Games
- Venue: Alexander Stadium
- Dates: 6 August (first round); 7 August (final)
- Competitors: 56 from 13 nations
- Winning time: 38.35

Medalists
gold medal	Jona Efoloko; Zharnel Hughes; Nethaneel Mitchell-Blake; Ojie Edoburun; Harry Aikines-Aryeetey	England
silver medal	Jerod Elcock; Eric Harrison Jr. Kion Benjamin; Kyle Greaux; Akanni Hislop	Trinidad and Tobago
bronze medal	Udodi Onwuzurike; Favour Ashe; Alaba Akintola; Raymond Ekevwo; Seye Ogunlewe	Nigeria

The men's 4 × 100 metres relay at the 2022 Commonwealth Games, as part of the athletics programme, took place in the Alexander Stadium on 6 and 7 August 2022.

== Records ==
Prior to this competition, the existing world and Games records were as follows:

World record	Jamaica (Nesta Carter, Michael Frater, Yohan Blake, Usain Bolt)	36.84	London, United Kingdom	11 August 2012
Commonwealth record	Jamaica (Nesta Carter, Michael Frater, Yohan Blake, Usain Bolt)	36.84	London, United Kingdom	11 August 2012
Games record	Jamaica (Jason Livermore, Kemar Bailey-Cole, Nickel Ashmeade, Usain Bolt)	37.58	Glasgow, Scotland	2 August 2014

== Schedule ==
The schedule was as follows:

Date	Time	Round
Saturday 6 August 2022	12:47	First round
Sunday 7 August 2022	12:40	Final

All times are British Summer Time (UTC+1)

== Results ==
=== First round ===
The first three in each heat (Q) and the next two fastest (q) qualified for the final.

Rank	Heat	Lane	Nation	Athletes	Time	Notes
1	1	8	England	Jona Efoloko, Harry Aikines-Aryeetey, Nethaneel Mitchell-Blake, Ojie Edoburun	38.48	Q, SB
2	1	5	Trinidad and Tobago	Jerod Elcock, Eric Harrison Jr., Kion Benjamin, Akanni Hislop	38.84	Q, SB
3	2	3	Nigeria	Raymond Ekevwo, Favour Ashe, Alaba Akintola, Seye Ogunlewe	38.85	Q
4	2	8	Kenya	Samwel Imeta, Mike Nyang'au, Hesborn Ochieng, Ferdinand Omanyala	38.92	Q, NR
5	2	4	The Gambia	Sengan Jobe, Alieu Joof, Ebrahima Camara, Adama Jammeh	39.77	Q, SB
6	1	2	Guyana	Akeem Stewart, Emanuel Archibald, Arinze Chance, Noelex Holder	39.82	Q, SB
7	1	4	Singapore	Marc Brian Louis, Joshua Chua, Xander Ho Ann Heng, Ian Koe	39.95	q
8	2	6	Saint Lucia	Michael Joseph, Delan Edwin, Lenyn Leonce, Stephan Charles	39.96	q, NR
9	1	7	Samoa	William Hunt, Kelvin Masoe, Johnny Key, Jeremy Dodson	40.60	SB
10	2	7	Turks and Caicos Islands	Courtney Missick, Ifeanyichukwu Otuonye, Angelo Garland, Wilkinson Fenelon	41.17	NR
11	1	2	Montserrat	Johmari Lee, Julius Morris, Sanjay Weekes, Tevique Benjamin	41.47	NR
	1	6	Australia	Joshua Azzopardi, Jacob Despard, Jack Hale, Rohan Browning	DNF	
	2	5	Ghana	Sean Safo-Antwi, Benjamin Azamati, Barnabas Aggerh, Joseph Amoah	DQ	TR 24.11

=== Final ===
The medals were determined in the final.

Rank	Lane	Nation	Athletes	Time	Notes
1st place, gold medalist(s)	4	England	Jona Efoloko, Zharnel Hughes, Nethaneel Mitchell-Blake, Ojie Edoburun	38.35	SB
2nd place, silver medalist(s)	5	Trinidad and Tobago	Jerod Elcock, Eric Harrison Jr., Kion Benjamin, Kyle Greaux	38.70	SB
3rd place, bronze medalist(s)	6	Nigeria	Udodi Onwuzurike, Favour Ashe, Alaba Akintola, Raymond Ekevwo	38.81	
4	8	Guyana	Akeem Stewart, Emanuel Archibald, Arinze Chance, Noelex Holder	40.05	
5	2	Saint Lucia	Michael Joseph, Delan Edwin, Lenyn Leonce, Stephan Charles	40.17	
6	9	The Gambia	Sengan Jobe, Alieu Joof, Ebrahima Camara, Adama Jammeh	40.18	
7	3	Singapore	Marc Brian Louis, Joshua Chua, Xander Ho Ann Heng, Ian Koe	40.24	
	7	Kenya	Samwel Imeta, Dan Asamba, Mike Nyang'au, Ferdinand Omanyala	DNF	
