= Montserrat at the 2026 Commonwealth Games =

- Flag of Montserrat
- CG code: MSR
- CGA: Montserrat Commonwealth Games Association

in Glasgow, Scotland 23 July 2026 – 2 August 2026
- Competitors: 7 in 1 sport
- Flag bearer: Julius Morris
- Baton bearer: Amani Kirnon
- Medals: Gold 0 Silver 0 Bronze 0 Total 0

Commonwealth Games appearances (overview)
- 1994; 1998; 2002; 2006; 2010; 2014; 2018; 2022; 2026; 2030

Montserrat competed at the 2026 Commonwealth Games in Glasgow, Scotland. This marked Montserrat's ninth participation at the games, after making its debut at the 1994 Commonwealth Games.

The King's Baton relay stopped in Montserrat in May 2025.

The Montserrat team consisted of seven athletes (six men and one woman) competing in one sport. Team official, and former athlete Julius Morris was the country's flagbearer during the opening ceremony. Meanwhile, sprinter Amani Kirnon was the baton bearer during the opening ceremony.

== Competitors ==
The following is the list of number of competitors participating at the Games per sport/discipline.

Sport	Men	Women	Total
Athletics	6	1	7
Total	6	1	7

== Athletics ==
Montserrat entered seven athletes (six men and one woman).

Key

Ranks given for track events are within the athlete's heat only.

- Q = Qualified for the next round
- q = Qualified for the next round as a fastest loser or, in field events, by position without achieving the qualifying target

Track events

Athlete	Event	Round one		Semifinal		Final	
Athlete	Event	Result	Rank	Result	Rank	Result	Rank
Tevique Benjamin	Men's 100 m	10.88	6	Did not advance			
Shernyl Burns	Men's 100 m	11.26	7	Did not advance			
Rolston Daley	Men's 100 m	Did not start					
Tevique Benjamin	Men's 200 m	22.00 PB	6	Did not advance			
Adin Corbette	Men's 400 m	51.31	8	Did not advance			
Mario Greenaway	Men's 400 m	49.53	6	Did not advance			
Amani Kirnon	Women's 200 m	24.13	4	Did not advance			
Amani Kirnon	Women's 400 m	DQ		Did not advance			

Field event

Athlete	Event	Qualification		Final	
Athlete	Event	Distance	Rank	Distance	Rank
Sydney Mendes	Men's long jump	6.42	20	Did not advance	
