= Turks and Caicos Islands at the 2018 Commonwealth Games =

- Flag of the Turks and Caicos Islands
- CG code: TCA
- CGA: Turks and Caicos Islands Commonwealth Games Association

in Gold Coast, Australia 4 April 2018 – 15 April 2018
- Competitors: 7 in 2 sports
- Flag bearer: Latoya Rigby (opening)
- Medals: Gold 0 Silver 0 Bronze 0 Total 0

Commonwealth Games appearances (overview)
- 1978; 1982–1994; 1998; 2002; 2006; 2010; 2014; 2018; 2022; 2026; 2030

The Turks and Caicos Islands competed at the 2018 Commonwealth Games in the Gold Coast, Australia from April 4 to April 15, 2018.

Sport shooter Latoya Rigby was the island's flag bearer during the opening ceremony.

== Competitors ==
The following is the list of number of competitors participating at the Games per sport/discipline.

Sport	Men	Women	Total
Athletics	5	0	5
Shooting	1	1	2
Total	6	1	7

== Athletics ==
The Turks and Caicos Islands participated with 5 athletes (5 men).

Men
Track & road events

Athlete	Event	Heat		Semifinal		Final	
Athlete	Event	Result	Rank	Result	Rank	Result	Rank
Frantzley Benjamin	100 m	11.46	8	did not advance			
Devante Gardiner	100 m	10.74	6	did not advance			
Devante Gardiner	200 m	21.79	5	did not advance			
Angelo Garland	400 m	48.38	5	did not advance			
Frantzley Benjamin; Devante Gardiner; Angelo Garland; Ifeanyi Otuonye	4 × 400 m relay	3:13.70	5 q	—N/a		3:16.39	6

Field events

Athlete	Event	Qualification		Final	
Athlete	Event	Distance	Rank	Distance	Rank
Kivarno Handfield	High jump	2.10	19	did not advance	
Ifeanyi Otuonye	Long jump	8.03	3 Q	7.80	9

== Shooting ==
The Turks and Caicos Islands participated with 2 athletes (1 man and 1 woman).

Athlete	Event	Qualification		Final	
Athlete	Event	Points	Rank	Points	Rank
Dovar Moultrie	Men's 10 metre air pistol	440	24	did not advance	
Latoya Rigby	Women's 10 metre air pistol	292	25	did not advance	
