= 2018 NACAC Championships – Results =

These are the full results of the 2018 NACAC Championships in Toronto, Ontario, Canada, from August 10 to 12, 2018 at Varsity Stadium.

== Men's results ==
=== 100 metres ===
Preliminaries – August 11
Wind:
Heat 1: +0.4 m/s, Heat 2: +1.1 m/s

Rank	Heat	Name	Nationality	Time	Notes
1	1	Hakeem Huggins	Saint Kitts and Nevis	10.60	Q
2	1	Yohandris Andújar	Dominican Republic	10.61	Q
3	2	Shaquoy Stephens	British Virgin Islands	10.67	Q
4	1	Cliff Resias	Bahamas	10.71	Q
5	2	Stanley del Carmen	Dominican Republic	10.84	Q
6	2	Devante Gardiner	Turks and Caicos Islands	10.95	Q
7	2	Lavon Allen	Montserrat	10.95	q
8	2	McKish Compton	Saint Vincent and the Grenadines	10.96	q
9	1	Reberto Boyde	Saint Vincent and the Grenadines	11.01	q
10	1	Emmanuel Agenor	Turks and Caicos Islands	11.21	
11	1	Saymon Rijo	Anguilla	11.42	
	2	Darien Johnson	Haiti	DNS	

Heats – August 11
Wind:
Heat 1: +1.4 m/s, Heat 2: +1.5 m/s, Heat 3: +2.9 m/s

Rank	Heat	Name	Nationality	Time	Notes
1	1	Tyquendo Tracey	Jamaica	10.12	Q
2	3	Kenroy Anderson	Jamaica	10.13	Q
3	2	Kendal Williams	United States	10.15	Q
4	1	Gavin Smellie	Canada	10.15	Q
5	3	Cameron Burrell	United States	10.16	Q
6	1	Warren Fraser	Bahamas	10.20	q
7	2	Bismark Boateng	Canada	10.23	Q
8	2	Jason Rogers	Saint Kitts and Nevis	10.23	q
9	2	Mario Burke	Barbados	10.29	
10	3	Reynier Mena	Cuba	10.30	
11	1	Burkheart Ellis Jr	Barbados	10.46	
12	3	Yohandris Andújar	Dominican Republic	10.49	
13	3	Julius Morris	Montserrat	10.50	
14	3	Hakeem Huggins	Saint Kitts and Nevis	10.51	
15	1	Shaquoy Stephens	British Virgin Islands	10.52	
16	2	Cliff Resias	Bahamas	10.61	
17	2	Jalen Purcell	Trinidad and Tobago	10.72	
18	1	Stanley del Carmen	Dominican Republic	10.73	
19	3	Melique García	Honduras	10.76	
20	1	Devante Gardiner	Turks and Caicos Islands	10.78	
21	2	McKish Compton	Saint Vincent and the Grenadines	10.85	
22	3	Reberto Boyde	Saint Vincent and the Grenadines	10.90	
23	2	Lavon Allen	Montserrat	11.00	
	1	Keston Bledman	Trinidad and Tobago	DNS	

Final – August 11
Wind: +0.4 m/s

Rank	Lane	Name	Nationality	Time	Notes
1st place, gold medalist(s)	4	Tyquendo Tracey	Jamaica	10.03	CR
2nd place, silver medalist(s)	5	Kendal Williams	United States	10.11	
3rd place, bronze medalist(s)	7	Cameron Burrell	United States	10.12	
4	8	Bismark Boateng	Canada	10.16	
5	6	Gavin Smellie	Canada	10.21	
6	2	Warren Fraser	Bahamas	10.26	
	3	Kenroy Anderson	Jamaica	DNF	
	1	Jason Rogers	Saint Kitts and Nevis	DQ	R162.8

=== 200 metres ===
Heats – August 10
Wind:
Heat 1: +0.1 m/s, Heat 2: +0.5 m/s, Heat 3: +0.5 m/s

Rank	Heat	Name	Nationality	Time	Notes
1	3	Aaron Brown	Canada	20.58	Q
2	1	Kyle Greaux	Trinidad and Tobago	20.74	Q
3	1	Nigel Ellis	Jamaica	20.76	Q
4	1	Jaquone Hoyte	Barbados	20.77	q
5	2	Jahnoy Thompson	Jamaica	20.79	Q
6	2	Jerome Blake	Canada	20.81	Q
7	1	Terrell Smith	United States	20.85	q
8	3	Andrew Hudson	United States	20.87	Q
9	3	Teray Smith	Bahamas	20.90	
10	2	Julius Morris	Montserrat	21.11	
11	2	Cliff Resias	Bahamas	21.32	
12	3	Robert Moise	Haiti	21.32	
13	3	Arnaldo Romero	Cuba	21.70	
14	2	Nathan Farinha	Trinidad and Tobago	21.70	
15	1	Yariel Matute	Honduras	21.71	
16	3	Alexander Ramadin	Antigua and Barbuda	21.87	
17	2	Devante Gardiner	Turks and Caicos Islands	22.05	
18	2	Melique García	Honduras	22.26	
19	1	Reuberth Boyde	Saint Vincent and the Grenadines	22.59	
	3	Warren Hazel	Saint Kitts and Nevis	DNS	

Final – August 12
Wind:
+1.7 m/s

Rank	Lane	Name	Nationality	Time	Notes
1st place, gold medalist(s)	4	Kyle Greaux	Trinidad and Tobago	20.11	CR
2nd place, silver medalist(s)	6	Aaron Brown	Canada	20.20	
3rd place, bronze medalist(s)	5	Nigel Ellis	Jamaica	20.57	
4	3	Jahnoy Thompson	Jamaica	20.59	
5	7	Jerome Blake	Canada	20.64	
6	8	Andrew Hudson	United States	20.67	
7	1	Jaquone Hoyte	Barbados	21.20	
	2	Terrell Smith	United States	DQ	R162.8

=== 400 metres ===
Heats – August 10

Rank	Heat	Name	Nationality	Time	Notes
1	2	Myles Pringle	United States	46.28	Q
2	2	Bralon Taplin	Grenada	46.37	Q
3	2	Fitzroy Dunkley	Jamaica	46.55	Q
4	1	Nery Brenes	Costa Rica	46.55	Q
5	1	Demish Gaye	Jamaica	46.62	Q
6	1	Alonzo Russell	Bahamas	46.88	Q
7	2	Yoandys Lescay	Cuba	46.94	q
8	1	Luis Charles	Dominican Republic	47.09	q
9	2	Austin Cole	Canada	47.13	
10	1	Joshua Cunningham	Canada	47.19	
11	2	Anderson Devonish	Barbados	47.73	
12	1	Rubén Rey	Cuba	48.18	
13	2	Kimorie Shearman	Saint Vincent and the Grenadines	48.19	
14	2	McDaniel Olivier	Haiti	48.60	
15	1	OJ Junior Jackson	Saint Vincent and the Grenadines	49.10	
	1	Warren Hazel	Saint Kitts and Nevis	DNS	

Final – August 11

Rank	Lane	Name	Nationality	Time	Notes
1st place, gold medalist(s)	6	Demish Gaye	Jamaica	45.47	
2nd place, silver medalist(s)	4	Nery Brenes	Costa Rica	45.67	
3rd place, bronze medalist(s)	7	Fitzroy Dunkley	Jamaica	45.76	
4	3	Myles Pringle	United States	45.99	
5	1	Yoandys Lescay	Cuba	46.21	
6	8	Alonzo Russell	Bahamas	46.26	
7	2	Luis Charles	Dominican Republic	47.27	
8	5	Bralon Taplin	Grenada	47.80	YC

=== 800 metres ===
August 11

Rank	Name	Nationality	Time	Notes
1st place, gold medalist(s)	Brandon McBride	Canada	1:46.14	
2nd place, silver medalist(s)	Marco Arop	Canada	1:46.82	
3rd place, bronze medalist(s)	Wesley Vázquez	Puerto Rico	1:47.63	
4	Anthonio Mascoll	Barbados	1:48.00	
5	Drew Piazza	United States	1:48.31	
6	Brandon Lasater	United States	1:50.91	
7	Kasique Oliver	Saint Vincent and the Grenadines	1:51.34	
8	Akani Slater	Saint Vincent and the Grenadines	1:51.34	
9	Ashton Gill	Trinidad and Tobago	1:52.83	
10	Dage Minors	Bermuda	1:53.10	

=== 1500 metres ===
August 12

Rank	Name	Nationality	Time	Notes
1st place, gold medalist(s)	Izaic Yorks	United States	3:51.85	
2nd place, silver medalist(s)	Patrick Casey	United States	3:51.87	
3rd place, bronze medalist(s)	Charles Philibert-Thiboutot	Canada	3:52.60	
4	Pedro Acuña	Cuba	3:54.08	
	Dage Minors	Bermuda	DNS	

=== 5000 metres ===
August 11

Rank	Name	Nationality	Time	Notes
1st place, gold medalist(s)	Hassan Mead	United States	14:00.18	
2nd place, silver medalist(s)	Riley Masters	United States	14:01.04	
3rd place, bronze medalist(s)	Justyn Knight	Canada	14:01.77	
4	Emmanuel Bor	United States	14:02.40	
5	Kemoy Campbell	Jamaica	14:10.68	

=== 10,000 metres ===
August 10

Rank	Name	Nationality	Time	Notes
1st place, gold medalist(s)	Lopez Lomong	United States	29:49.03	
2nd place, silver medalist(s)	Elkanah Kibet	United States	29:51.37	
3rd place, bronze medalist(s)	Reed Fischer	United States	29:53.63	
4	Sergio Raez	Canada	30:20.31	
	Yasser Fernando Reyes	Nicaragua	DNS	

=== 110 metres hurdles ===
Heats – August 10
Wind:
Heat 1: +0.5 m/s, Heat 2: +0.8 m/s

Rank	Heat	Name	Nationality	Time	Notes
1	2	Devon Allen	United States	13.37	Q
2	2	Hansle Parchment	Jamaica	13.42	Q
3	1	Johnathan Cabral	Canada	13.43	Q
4	1	Aleec Harris	United States	13.49	Q
5	2	Shane Brathwaite	Barbados	13.53	Q
6	1	Ruebin Walters	Trinidad and Tobago	13.66	Q
7	1	Jeffery Julmis	Haiti	13.71	q
8	1	Rasheem Brown	Cayman Islands	14.42	q
9	2	Aaron Lewis	Trinidad and Tobago	15.48	
	2	Roger Iribarne	Cuba	DQ	R162.8

Final – August 11
Wind:
+0.4 m/s

Rank	Lane	Name	Nationality	Time	Notes
1st place, gold medalist(s)	6	Hansle Parchment	Jamaica	13.28	
2nd place, silver medalist(s)	3	Aleec Harris	United States	13.49	
3rd place, bronze medalist(s)	7	Shane Brathwaite	Barbados	13.52	
4	2	Jeffery Julmis	Haiti	13.63	
5	8	Ruebin Walters	Trinidad and Tobago	13.72	
6	5	Johnathan Cabral	Canada	14.07	
7	1	Rasheem Brown	Cayman Islands	14.42	
	4	Devon Allen	United States	DQ	R168.7

=== 400 metres hurdles ===
Heats – August 10

Rank	Heat	Name	Nationality	Time	Notes
1	1	Kyron McMaster	British Virgin Islands	49.16	Q
2	2	Annsert Whyte	Jamaica	49.56	Q
3	1	Khallifah Rosser	United States	49.68	Q
4	2	TJ Holmes	United States	49.71	Q
5	2	Leandro Zamora	Cuba	49.76	Q
6	1	Shawn Rowe	Jamaica	49.91	Q
7	2	Jehue Gordon	Trinidad and Tobago	50.02	q
8	1	Emmanuel Niño	Costa Rica	50.14	q
9	2	Pablo Andrés Ibáñez	El Salvador	50.50	
10	2	Gerald Drummond	Costa Rica	50.65	
11	2	Kion Joseph	Barbados	50.93	
12	1	Fabian Norgrove	Barbados	51.47	
13	1	Malik Metivier	Canada	51.64	
14	2	Lloyd Hanley-Byron	Saint Kitts and Nevis	52.86	
	1	Boaz Madeus	Haiti	DNF	

Final – August 12

Rank	Lane	Name	Nationality	Time	Notes
1st place, gold medalist(s)	3	Kyron McMaster	British Virgin Islands	48.18	CR
2nd place, silver medalist(s)	6	Annsert Whyte	Jamaica	48.91	
3rd place, bronze medalist(s)	4	Khallifah Rosser	United States	49.13	
4	7	Shawn Rowe	Jamaica	49.40	
5	5	TJ Holmes	United States	49.79	
6	8	Leandro Zamora	Cuba	50.01	
7	1	Jehue Gordon	Trinidad and Tobago	50.12	
8	2	Emmanuel Niño	Costa Rica	51.13	

=== 3000 metres steeplechase ===
August 12

Rank	Name	Nationality	Time	Notes
1st place, gold medalist(s)	Andy Bayer	United States	8:28.55	
2nd place, silver medalist(s)	Travis Mahoney	United States	8:29.29	
3rd place, bronze medalist(s)	Jordan Mann	United States	8:45.14	

=== 4 × 100 metres relay ===
August 12

Rank	Lane	Nation	Competitors	Time	Notes
1st place, gold medalist(s)	6	Canada	Bismark Boateng, Jerome Blake, Mobolade Ajomale, Aaron Brown	38.57	
2nd place, silver medalist(s)	5	Barbados	Shane Brathwaite, Mario Burke, Burkheart Ellis Jr, Jaquone Hoyte	38.69	
3rd place, bronze medalist(s)	7	Trinidad and Tobago	Nathan Farinha, Jonathan Farinha, Jalen Purcell, Kyle Greaux	38.89	
4	3	Jamaica	Javoy Tucker, Tyquendo Tracey, Nesta Carter, Nigel Ellis	38.96	
5	8	Turks and Caicos Islands	Colby Jennings, Ifeanyichukwu Otuonye, Devante Gardiner, Emmanuel Agenor	41.21	
	4	United States	Jeff Demps, Kendal Williams, Cordero Gray, Cameron Burrell	DNF	

=== 4 × 400 metres relay ===
August 12

Rank	Nation	Competitors	Time	Notes
1st place, gold medalist(s)	United States	Nathan Strother, Obi Igbokwe, Michael Cherry, Kahmari Montgomery	3:00.60	
2nd place, silver medalist(s)	Bahamas	O'Jay Ferguson, Teray Smith, Michael Mathieu, Alonzo Russell	3:03.80	
3rd place, bronze medalist(s)	Cuba	Leandro Zamora, Adrián Chacón, Rubén Caballero, Yoandys Lescay	3:04.11	
4	Canada	Daniel Harper, Austin Cole, Philip Osei, Nathan George	3:04.74	
5	Barbados	Anderson Devonish, Anthonio Mascoll, Kion Joseph, Fabian Norgrove	3:05.97	
	Saint Vincent and the Grenadines	OJ Junior Jackson, Kasique Oliver, Akani Slater, Kimorie Shearman	DQ	R170.19
	Jamaica	Rusheen McDonald, Fitzroy Dunkley, Ivan Henry, Demish Gaye	DQ	R170.19
	Turks and Caicos Islands		DNS	

=== 20,000 metres walk ===
August 10

Rank	Name	Nationality	Time	Notes
1st place, gold medalist(s)	Evan Dunfee	Canada	1:25:39.00	
2nd place, silver medalist(s)	Nick Christie	United States	1:30:11.00	
3rd place, bronze medalist(s)	John Cody Risch	United States	1:36:05.00	
	Emmanuel Corvera	United States	DQ	

=== High jump ===
August 11

Rank	Name	Nationality	2.00	2.05	2.10	2.13	2.16	2.19	2.22	2.25	2.28	2.31	Result	Notes
1st place, gold medalist(s)	Jeron Robinson	United States	–	–	–	–	o	–	xo	xxo	o	xxx	2.28	CR
2nd place, silver medalist(s)	Michael Mason	Canada	–	–	o	–	xo	o	o	xo	xo	xxx	2.28	CR
3rd place, bronze medalist(s)	Donald Thomas	Bahamas	–	–	o	–	–	o	–	xxo	xxo	xxx	2.28	CR
3rd place, bronze medalist(s)	Django Lovett	Canada	–	–	xo	–	o	o	o	xo	xxo	r	2.28	
5	Jamaal Wilson	Bahamas	–	–	o	–	o	–	xo	xxx			2.22	
6	Edgar Rivera	Mexico	–	–	o	–	o	–	xxo	xxx			2.22	
7	Clayton Brown	Jamaica	–	o	o	o	o	xxx					2.16	
8	Trey Culver	United States	–	–	o	xo	o	xxx					2.16	
9	Luis Castro	Puerto Rico	–	–	xxo	–	xxo	–	xxx				2.16	
10	Kareem Roberts	Trinidad and Tobago	xo	–	xxo	xxx							2.10	
11	Kivarno Handfield	Turks and Caicos Islands	xo	xxx									2.00	

=== Pole vault ===
August 12

Rank	Name	Nationality	5.10	5.20	5.30	5.40	5.45	5.50	Result	Notes
1st place, gold medalist(s)	Scott Houston	United States	xo	–	xo	–	xo	xxx	5.45	CR
2nd place, silver medalist(s)	Shawnacy Barber	Canada	o	–	o	xo	xx–	x	5.40	
	Cole Walsh	United States	–	–	xxx				NM	

=== Long jump ===
August 12

Rank	Name	Nationality	#1	#2	#3	#4	#5	#6	Result	Notes
1st place, gold medalist(s)	Marquis Dendy	United States	8.29	x	x	7.94	7.80	x	8.29	CR
2nd place, silver medalist(s)	Tajay Gayle	Jamaica	x	7.98	8.15	7.94	8.13	8.24	8.24	
3rd place, bronze medalist(s)	Ramone Bailey	Jamaica	x	7.82	7.87	7.77	7.60	8.09	8.09	
4	Tyrone Smith	Bermuda	7.57	x	x	7.21	7.82	7.98	7.98	
5	Andwuelle Wright	Trinidad and Tobago	7.60	7.58	x	7.93	7.75	7.80	7.93	
6	Ifeanyichukwu Otuonye	Turks and Caicos Islands	x	x	7.77	x	7.78	x	7.78	
7	Damarcus Simpson	United States	x	x	7.54	7.57	x	7.76	7.76	
8	Jared Kerr	Canada	7.58	7.51	x	7.25	x	7.57	7.58	
9	Charles Greaves	Barbados	7.43	7.43	7.49				7.49	
10	Lavon Allen	Montserrat	6.95	x	7.43				7.43	
11	Quincy Breell	Aruba	x	6.93	6.16				6.93	
	Ángel Marcelo Suárez	Nicaragua							DNS	

=== Triple jump ===
August 10

Rank	Name	Nationality	#1	#2	#3	#4	#5	#6	Result	Notes
1st place, gold medalist(s)	Jordan Díaz	Cuba	16.32	16.67	16.83	16.51	–	16.58	16.83	
2nd place, silver medalist(s)	Chris Benard	United States	16.61	x	16.73	16.27	x	16.65	16.73	
3rd place, bronze medalist(s)	Keandre Bates	United States	14.95	16.58	15.56	15.40	16.12	x	16.58	
4	Yordanys Durañona	Dominica	x	15.60	16.05	–	x	x	16.05	
5	Kaiwan Culmer	Bahamas	x	x	x	14.11	15.86	16.01	16.01	
6	Alberto Álvarez	Mexico	15.59	15.11	15.69	x	15.64	15.76	15.76	
7	Patrick Hanna	Canada	15.32	15.11	15.36	15.20	15.16	x	15.36	
	Jordan Scott	Jamaica	x	–	–	–	–	–	NM	

=== Shot put ===
August 10

Rank	Name	Nationality	#1	#2	#3	#4	#5	#6	Result	Notes
1st place, gold medalist(s)	Darrell Hill	United States	20.62	21.52	21.68	x	x	x	21.68	CR
2nd place, silver medalist(s)	Tim Nedow	Canada	21.02	20.65	20.50	20.19	20.60	20.72	21.02	
3rd place, bronze medalist(s)	O'Dayne Richards	Jamaica	19.80	20.89	20.35	20.78	20.13	x	20.89	
4	Ashinia Miller	Jamaica	x	19.74	19.80	19.49	20.85	20.09	20.85	
5	Eldred Henry	British Virgin Islands	19.25	19.80	20.63	20.56	19.17	18.38	20.63	
6	Curtis Jensen	United States	19.51	20.17	20.20	20.44	20.23	20.29	20.44	
7	Hezekiel Romeo	Trinidad and Tobago	16.31	17.66	17.78	18.01	17.84	17.69	18.01	
8	Rickssen Opont	Haiti	16.04	x	x	16.16	14.39	15.62	16.16	

=== Discus throw ===
August 12

Rank	Name	Nationality	#1	#2	#3	#4	#5	#6	Result	Notes
1st place, gold medalist(s)	Fedrick Dacres	Jamaica	65.89	67.39	64.19	x	66.46	68.47	68.47	CR
2nd place, silver medalist(s)	Traves Smikle	Jamaica	64.48	63.67	61.77	x	65.46	64.75	65.46	
3rd place, bronze medalist(s)	Reggie Jagers	United States	55.25	x	62.42	62.70	x	x	62.70	
4	Mason Finley	United States	59.22	58.46	60.09	59.80	61.55	58.61	61.55	
5	Abel Gilet	Haiti	33.24	41.50	x	x	42.91	x	42.91	
6	Rickssen Opont	Haiti	35.81	40.70	x	x	x	x	40.70	
	Akeem Stewart	Trinidad and Tobago							DNS	

=== Hammer throw ===
August 11

Rank	Name	Nationality	#1	#2	#3	#4	#5	#6	Result	Notes
1st place, gold medalist(s)	Roberto Sawyers	Costa Rica	69.31	x	71.05	70.56	72.94	70.22	72.94	CR
2nd place, silver medalist(s)	Alex Young	United States	68.31	70.81	x	70.10	68.43	72.75	72.75	
3rd place, bronze medalist(s)	Adam Keenan	Canada	70.19	71.40	72.72	71.05	71.98	x	72.72	
4	Rudy Winkler	United States	68.52	70.45	70.41	67.72	x	70.36	70.45	
5	Caniggia Raynor	Jamaica	60.76	x	63.49	60.72	x	64.83	64.83	

=== Javelin throw ===
August 11

Rank	Name	Nationality	#1	#2	#3	#4	#5	#6	Result	Notes
1st place, gold medalist(s)	Anderson Peters	Grenada	78.67	x	77.51	x	79.65	77.38	79.65	CR
2nd place, silver medalist(s)	Curtis Thompson	United States	73.08	74.18	76.02	72.34	75.23	72.83	76.02	
3rd place, bronze medalist(s)	Markim Felix	Grenada	67.49	72.62	75.14	73.08	69.94	68.06	75.14	
4	Capers Williamson	United States	72.24	74.39	71.72	65.14	69.96	64.12	74.39	
5	Evan Karakolis	Canada	63.39	66.56	64.81	66.09	68.02	x	68.02	
6	Brian Donna	Haiti	51.46	x	46.54	41.27	x	47.80	51.46	

== Women's results ==
=== 100 metres ===
Heats – August 11
Wind:
Heat 1: +1.0 m/s, Heat 2: +0.8 m/s

Rank	Heat	Name	Nationality	Time	Notes
1	1	Jenna Prandini	United States	11.01	Q
2	2	Jonielle Smith	Jamaica	11.17	Q
3	2	Crystal Emmanuel	Canada	11.19	Q
4	2	Dezerea Bryant	United States	11.22	Q
5	1	Shelly-Ann Fraser-Pryce	Jamaica	11.25	Q
6	2	Khalifa St. Fort	Trinidad and Tobago	11.39	q
7	1	Leya Buchanan	Canada	11.62	Q
8	1	Tahesia Harrigan-Scott	British Virgin Islands	11.62	q
9	2	Laverne Jones-Ferrette	United States Virgin Islands	11.76	
10	1	Taahira Butterfield	Bermuda	12.22	
	2	Akia Guerrier	Turks and Caicos Islands	DQ	R162.8

Final – August 11
Wind:
+0.9 m/s

Rank	Lane	Name	Nationality	Time	Notes
1st place, gold medalist(s)	4	Jenna Prandini	United States	10.96	CR
2nd place, silver medalist(s)	6	Jonielle Smith	Jamaica	11.07	
3rd place, bronze medalist(s)	3	Crystal Emmanuel	Canada	11.11	
4	7	Dezerea Bryant	United States	11.17	
5	5	Shelly-Ann Fraser-Pryce	Jamaica	11.18	
6	2	Khalifa St. Fort	Trinidad and Tobago	11.28	
7	1	Tahesia Harrigan-Scott	British Virgin Islands	11.61	
8	8	Leya Buchanan	Canada	11.63	

=== 200 metres ===
Heats – August 10
Wind:
Heat 1: -0.2 m/s, Heat 2: +0.3 m/s

Rank	Heat	Name	Nationality	Time	Notes
1	2	Crystal Emmanuel	Canada	22.82	Q
2	2	Shericka Jackson	Jamaica	22.97	Q
3	1	Jodean Williams	Jamaica	23.03	Q
4	2	Phyllis Francis	United States	23.07	Q
5	1	Brittany Brown	United States	23.22	Q
6	1	Semoy Hackett	Trinidad and Tobago	23.31	Q
7	1	Ty'nia Gaither	Bahamas	23.37	q
8	1	Reyare Thomas	Trinidad and Tobago	23.62	q
9	1	Leya Buchanan	Canada	23.91	
10	2	Laverne Jones-Ferrette	United States Virgin Islands	24.36	

Final – August 12
Wind:
-0.3 m/s

Rank	Lane	Name	Nationality	Time	Notes
1st place, gold medalist(s)	6	Shericka Jackson	Jamaica	22.64	
2nd place, silver medalist(s)	5	Crystal Emmanuel	Canada	22.67	
3rd place, bronze medalist(s)	7	Phyllis Francis	United States	22.91	
4	3	Jodean Williams	Jamaica	23.19	
5	8	Semoy Hackett	Trinidad and Tobago	23.27	
6	1	Ty'nia Gaither	Bahamas	23.41	
7	4	Brittany Brown	United States	23.46	
8	2	Reyare Thomas	Trinidad and Tobago	23.73	

=== 400 metres ===
Heats – August 10

Rank	Heat	Name	Nationality	Time	Notes
1	2	Courtney Okolo	United States	51.81	Q
2	1	Stephenie Ann McPherson	Jamaica	52.22	Q
3	2	Christine Day	Jamaica	52.53	Q
4	1	Brionna Thomas	United States	53.18	Q
5	1	Aiyanna Stiverne	Canada	53.27	Q
6	2	Madeline Price	Canada	53.54	Q
7	2	Kineke Alexander	Saint Vincent and the Grenadines	54.91	q
8	2	Lisa Anne Barrow	Barbados	56.62	q
9	1	Tarika Moses	British Virgin Islands	57.94	

Final – August 11

Rank	Lane	Name	Nationality	Time	Notes
1st place, gold medalist(s)	4	Stephenie Ann McPherson	Jamaica	51.15	
2nd place, silver medalist(s)	7	Aiyanna Stiverne	Canada	52.00	
3rd place, bronze medalist(s)	3	Brionna Thomas	United States	52.19	
4	5	Courtney Okolo	United States	52.21	
5	6	Christine Day	Jamaica	53.04	
6	8	Madeline Price	Canada	53.13	
7	1	Kineke Alexander	Saint Vincent and the Grenadines	55.36	
8	2	Lisa Anne Barrow	Barbados	56.68	

=== 800 metres ===
August 11

Rank	Name	Nationality	Time	Notes
1st place, gold medalist(s)	Ajeé Wilson	United States	1:57.52	CR
2nd place, silver medalist(s)	Natoya Goule	Jamaica	1:57.95	
3rd place, bronze medalist(s)	Rose Mary Almanza	Cuba	2:00.15	
4	Raevyn Rogers	United States	2:00.75	
5	Lindsey Butterworth	Canada	2:00.81	
6	Simoya Campbell	Jamaica	2:00.98	
7	Alena Brooks	Trinidad and Tobago	2:03.77	
8	Sade Sealy	Barbados	2:05.08	
9	Sonia Gaskin	Barbados	2:06.54	

=== 1500 metres ===
August 12

Rank	Name	Nationality	Time	Notes
1st place, gold medalist(s)	Kate Grace	United States	4:06.23	
2nd place, silver medalist(s)	Shannon Osika	United States	4:06.92	
3rd place, bronze medalist(s)	Gabriela Stafford	Canada	4:07.36	
4	Rachel Schneider	United States	4:09.50	
5	Nicole Sifuentes	Canada	4:18.77	
6	Angelin Figueroa	Puerto Rico	4:33.15	

=== 5000 metres ===
August 10

Rank	Name	Nationality	Time	Notes
1st place, gold medalist(s)	Rachel Schneider	United States	15:26.19	
2nd place, silver medalist(s)	Lauren Paquette	United States	15:39.40	
3rd place, bronze medalist(s)	Kate Van Buskirk	Canada	15:50.35	

=== 10,000 metres ===
August 11

Rank	Name	Nationality	Time	Notes
1st place, gold medalist(s)	Marielle Hall	United States	33:27.19	
2nd place, silver medalist(s)	Rochelle Kanuho	United States	33:28.33	
3rd place, bronze medalist(s)	Rachel Cliff	Canada	33:30.16	
4	Sarah Pagano	United States	33:33.35	

=== 100 metres hurdles ===
Heats – August 10
Wind:
Heat 1: +0.2 m/s, Heat 2: +0.5 m/s

Rank	Heat	Name	Nationality	Time	Notes
1	2	Kendra Harrison	United States	12.66	Q
2	1	Danielle Williams	Jamaica	12.72	Q
3	2	Andrea Vargas	Costa Rica	12.94	Q
4	1	Queen Harrison	United States	13.03	Q
5	2	Devynne Charlton	Bahamas	13.07	Q
6	2	Yanique Thompson	Jamaica	13.17	q
7	1	Vanessa Clerveaux	Haiti	13.28	Q
8	1	Christie Moerman	Canada	13.35	q
9	2	Kierre Beckles	Barbados	13.45	
10	1	Kieshonna Brooks	Saint Kitts and Nevis	13.80	
11	1	Deya Erickson	British Virgin Islands	13.80	
12	2	Nancy Sandoval	El Salvador	14.31	
	2	Reanda Richards	Saint Kitts and Nevis	DNS	

Final – August 11
Wind:
+0.9 m/s

Rank	Lane	Name	Nationality	Time	Notes
1st place, gold medalist(s)	3	Kendra Harrison	United States	12.55	CR
2nd place, silver medalist(s)	5	Danielle Williams	Jamaica	12.67	
3rd place, bronze medalist(s)	4	Andrea Vargas	Costa Rica	12.91	
4	6	Queen Harrison	United States	12.93	
5	8	Devynne Charlton	Bahamas	13.01	
6	2	Yanique Thompson	Jamaica	13.02	
7	7	Vanessa Clerveaux	Haiti	13.21	
8	1	Christie Moerman	Canada	13.33	

=== 400 metres hurdles ===
Heats – August 10

Rank	Heat	Name	Nationality	Time	Notes
1	2	Leah Nugent	Jamaica	54.85	Q
2	1	Janieve Russell	Jamaica	55.07	Q
3	1	Georganne Moline	United States	55.38	Q
4	1	Zurian Hechevarría	Cuba	55.53	Q
5	2	Shamier Little	United States	56.30	Q
6	1	Noelle Montcalm	Canada	56.73	q
7	2	Sparkle McKnight	Trinidad and Tobago	57.14	Q
8	2	Tia-Adana Belle	Barbados	57.67	q
9	1	Katrina Seymour	Bahamas	57.79	
10	1	Janeil Bellille	Trinidad and Tobago	58.81	
11	2	Reanda Richards	Saint Kitts and Nevis	59.86	

Final – August 12

Rank	Lane	Name	Nationality	Time	Notes
1st place, gold medalist(s)	6	Shamier Little	United States	53.32	CR
2nd place, silver medalist(s)	4	Janieve Russell	Jamaica	53.81	
3rd place, bronze medalist(s)	3	Georganne Moline	United States	54.26	
4	7	Zurian Hechevarría	Cuba	55.71	
5	5	Leah Nugent	Jamaica	55.74	
6	8	Sparkle McKnight	Trinidad and Tobago	56.33	
7	2	Noelle Montcalm	Canada	56.97	
8	1	Tia-Adana Belle	Barbados	58.82	

=== 3000 metres steeplechase ===
August 10

Rank	Name	Nationality	Time	Notes
1st place, gold medalist(s)	Mel Lawrence	United States	9:45.36	CR
2nd place, silver medalist(s)	Emily Oren	United States	9:56.66	
3rd place, bronze medalist(s)	Megan Rolland	United States	9:59.85	

=== 4 × 100 metres relay ===
August 12

Rank	Lane	Nation	Competitors	Time	Notes
1st place, gold medalist(s)	4	United States	Kiara Parker, Shania Collins, Dezerea Bryant, Jenna Prandini	42.50	
2nd place, silver medalist(s)	5	Jamaica	Shelly-Ann Fraser-Pryce, Jura Levy, Jonielle Smith, Shericka Jackson	43.33	
3rd place, bronze medalist(s)	6	Canada	Shaina Harrison, Crystal Emmanuel, Phylicia George, Jellisa Westney	43.50	
	3	Trinidad and Tobago		DNS	

=== 4 × 400 metres relay ===
August 12

Rank	Nation	Competitors	Time	Notes
1st place, gold medalist(s)	United States	Briana Guillory, Jasmine Blocker, Kiana Horton, Courtney Okolo	3:26.08	
2nd place, silver medalist(s)	Jamaica	Stephenie Ann McPherson, Tiffany James, Anastasia Le-Roy, Christine Day	3:27.25	
3rd place, bronze medalist(s)	Canada	Micha Powell, Aiyanna Stiverne, Travia Jones, Alicia Brown	3:28.04	

=== 20,000 metres walk ===
August 10

Rank	Name	Nationality	Time	Notes
1st place, gold medalist(s)	Maria Michta-Coffey	United States	1:36:34.00	CR
2nd place, silver medalist(s)	Mirna Sucely	Guatemala	1:38:36.00	
3rd place, bronze medalist(s)	Katie Burnett	United States	1:39:31.00	
4	Dalia Oliveras	Puerto Rico	1:41:01.00	
	Robyn Stevens	United States	DQ	

=== High jump ===
August 10

Rank	Name	Nationality	1.73	1.76	1.79	1.82	1.85	1.88	1.91	1.94	Result	Notes
1st place, gold medalist(s)	Levern Spencer	Saint Lucia	–	–	–	xo	o	–	xo	xxx	1.91	CR
2nd place, silver medalist(s)	Elizabeth Patterson	United States	–	–	o	–	o	xxo	xx–	x	1.88	
3rd place, bronze medalist(s)	Loretta Blaut	United States	o	xxo	o	xo	xxx				1.82	
4	Ximena Esquivel	Mexico	–	xo	–	xxo	xxx				1.82	
	Alyxandria Treasure	Canada	–	xxx							NM	

=== Pole vault ===
August 11

Rank	Name	Nationality	4.10	4.30	4.40	4.45	4.60	4.65	4.70	4.75	4.80	Result	Notes
1st place, gold medalist(s)	Katie Nageotte	United States	–	–	–	o	xo	–	xo	xo	xxx	4.75	CR
2nd place, silver medalist(s)	Yarisley Silva	Cuba	–	–	xo	o	–	xo	xxo	xxx		4.70	
3rd place, bronze medalist(s)	Sandi Morris	United States	–	–	–	o	xo	o	xxx			4.65	
4	Alisandra Negrete	Mexico	o	xxx								4.10	
	Anicka Newell	Canada	–	–	xxx							NM	

=== Long jump ===
August 11

Rank	Name	Nationality	#1	#2	#3	#4	#5	#6	Result	Notes
1st place, gold medalist(s)	Sha'Keela Saunders	United States	6.60	6.34	6.33	6.48	x	x	6.60	
2nd place, silver medalist(s)	Quanesha Burks	United States	6.28	6.52	6.55	6.47	6.59	6.42	6.59	
3rd place, bronze medalist(s)	Tissanna Hickling	Jamaica	6.38	x	6.10	x	x	4.68	6.38	
4	Tyra Gittens	Trinidad and Tobago	5.53	6.09	6.25	5.83	6.02	5.78	6.25	
5	Chantel Malone	British Virgin Islands	6.00	6.18	6.05	6.17	6.18	6.19	6.19	
6	Bianca Stuart	Bahamas	5.99	x	5.94	6.09	x	6.07	6.09	
7	Alysbeth Félix	Puerto Rico	5.98	6.00	6.04	x	x	6.00	6.04	
8	Kala Penn	British Virgin Islands	6.01	5.95	x	x	5.97	–	6.01	

=== Triple jump ===
August 12

Rank	Name	Nationality	#1	#2	#3	#4	#5	#6	Result	Notes
1st place, gold medalist(s)	Shanieka Ricketts	Jamaica	13.79	14.04	x	13.55	14.21	14.25	14.25	CR
2nd place, silver medalist(s)	Tori Franklin	United States	13.82	13.99	x	x	14.09	13.83	14.09	
3rd place, bronze medalist(s)	Thea LaFond	Dominica	x	x	13.74	12.56	x	13.60	13.74	
4	Caroline Ehrhardt	Canada	x	13.26	13.54	13.63	x	13.36	13.63	
5	Lynnika Pitts	United States	12.98	13.39	13.32	13.32	11.23	13.17	13.39	
6	Ayanna Alexander	Trinidad and Tobago	12.91	12.94	x	12.86	12.89	12.91	12.94	
7	Odrine Belot	Haiti	12.24	x	x	11.88	12.30	12.06	12.30	
	Kala Penn	British Virgin Islands							DNS	

=== Shot put ===
August 12

Rank	Name	Nationality	#1	#2	#3	#4	#5	#6	Result	Notes
1st place, gold medalist(s)	Maggie Ewen	United States	17.06	17.35	18.22	17.84	17.95	x	18.22	
2nd place, silver medalist(s)	Cleopatra Borel	Trinidad and Tobago	17.01	17.83	x	17.39	17.42	17.08	17.83	
3rd place, bronze medalist(s)	Jessica Ramsey	United States	17.80	x	x	16.89	x	x	17.80	
	Trevia Gumbs	British Virgin Islands	x	x	x	–	–	–	NM	
	Lloydricia Cameron	Jamaica							DNS	

=== Discus throw ===
August 10

Rank	Name	Nationality	#1	#2	#3	#4	#5	#6	Result	Notes
1st place, gold medalist(s)	Yaime Pérez	Cuba	60.10	60.89	59.42	61.65	61.97	59.77	61.97	CR
2nd place, silver medalist(s)	Valarie Allman	United States	49.08	59.67	x	54.00	55.74	x	59.67	
3rd place, bronze medalist(s)	Maggie Ewen	United States	58.71	x	x	59.00	58.60	x	59.00	
4	Rachel Andres	Canada	53.40	54.27	55.65	53.99	55.05	54.14	55.65	
5	Trevia Gumbs	British Virgin Islands	x	46.95	x	44.75	x	x	46.95	
6	Tiara Derosa	Bermuda	36.63	x	40.47	42.00	42.47	43.01	43.01	
	Shadae Lawrence	Jamaica							DNS	
	Tynelle Gumbs	British Virgin Islands							DNS	

=== Hammer throw ===
August 10

Rank	Name	Nationality	#1	#2	#3	#4	#5	#6	Result	Notes
1st place, gold medalist(s)	DeAnna Price	United States	73.92	74.60	74.14	x	x	x	74.60	CR
2nd place, silver medalist(s)	Jillian Weir	Canada	66.59	69.00	x	71.96	69.95	69.97	71.96	
3rd place, bronze medalist(s)	Brooke Andersen	United States	70.05	x	67.09	68.09	x	67.53	70.05	
4	Tynelle Gumbs	British Virgin Islands	58.78	x	x	53.49	x	x	58.78	

=== Javelin throw ===
August 12

Rank	Name	Nationality	#1	#2	#3	#4	#5	#6	Result	Notes
1st place, gold medalist(s)	Ariana Ince	United States	58.25	52.27	57.72	57.11	x	59.59	59.59	
2nd place, silver medalist(s)	Bethany Drake	United States	54.71	51.45	50.59	50.13	x	54.07	54.71	
3rd place, bronze medalist(s)	Coralys Ortiz	Puerto Rico	48.71	51.51	54.71	51.77	51.12	53.11	54.71	
4	Rachel Andres	Canada	41.70	41.00	43.40	41.13	x	–	43.40	
	Kateema Riettie	Jamaica							DNS	
