= Montserrat at the 2014 Commonwealth Games =

- CG code: MSR
- CGA: Montserrat Commonwealth Games Association

in Glasgow, Scotland
- Competitors: 4 in 1 sport
- Flag bearer: Julius Morris
- Medals: Gold 0 Silver 0 Bronze 0 Total 0

Commonwealth Games appearances (overview)
- 1994; 1998; 2002; 2006; 2010; 2014; 2018; 2022; 2026; 2030

Montserrat competed in the 2014 Commonwealth Games in Glasgow, Scotland from 23 July to 3 August 2014. Montserrat's team consisted of four male athletes in athletics.

== Athletics ==
Key

- Note–Ranks given for track events are within the athlete's heat only
- Q = Qualified for the next round
- q = Qualified for the next round as a fastest loser or, in field events, by position without achieving the qualifying target
- NR = National record
- DQ = Disqualified
- N/A = Round not applicable for the event
- Bye = Athlete not required to compete in round

Men

Athlete	Event	Round 1		Semifinal		Final	
Athlete	Event	Result	Rank	Result	Rank	Result	Rank
Alford Dyett	100 m	11.13	=63	did not advance			
Julius Morris	100 m	10.55	32	did not advance			
Julius Morris	200 m	21.44	43	did not advance			
Lester Ryan	100 m	10.99	55	did not advance			
Lester Ryan	200 m	DSQ		did not advance			
Arlen Skerritt	200 m	24.37	67	did not advance			
Alford Dyett; Julius Morris; Lester Ryan; Arlen Skerritt	4 × 100 m relay	DSQ		—N/a		did not advance	
