= Montserrat at the 2022 Commonwealth Games =

- Flag of Montserrat
- CG code: MSR
- CGA: Montserrat Commonwealth Games Association

in Birmingham, England 28 July 2022 – 8 August 2022
- Competitors: 5 (5 men and 0 women) in 1 sport
- Flag bearer (opening): Julius Morris
- Flag bearer (closing): TBD
- Medals: Gold 0 Silver 0 Bronze 0 Total 0

Commonwealth Games appearances (overview)
- 1994; 1998; 2002; 2006; 2010; 2014; 2018; 2022; 2026; 2030

Montserrat was represented at the 2022 Commonwealth Games in Birmingham, England, United Kingdom by the Montserrat Commonwealth Games Association.

In total, five athletes – all men – represented Montserrat in one sport: athletics.

Julius Morris served as the territory's flagbearer during the opening ceremony.

== Competitors ==
In total, five athletes represented Montserrat at the 2022 Commonwealth Games in Birmingham, England, United Kingdom across one sport.

Sport	Men	Women	Total
Athletics	5	0	5
Total	5	0	5

== Athletics ==
In total, five Montserratian athletes participated in the athletics events – Tevique Benjamin and Johmari Lee in the men's 100 m and the men's 4 × 100 m relay, Julius Morris in the men's 100 m, the men's 200 m and the men's 4 × 100 m relay, Sanjay Weekes in the men's 200 m and the men's 4 × 100 m relay and Deshawn Wilkins in the men's 200 m.

The athletics events took place at Alexander Stadium in Perry Bar, Birmingham between 30 July and 7 August 2022.

The heats for the men's 100 m took place on 30 July 2022. Benjamin finished sixth in his heat in a time of 11.06 seconds. Lee finished sixth in his heat in a time of 11.03 seconds. Morris finished fourth in his heat in a time of 10.56 seconds. Of the three competitors, none advanced to the semi-final.

The heats for the men's 200 m took place on 4 August 2022. Morris finished seventh in his heat in a time of 21.57 seconds. Weekes finished seventh in his heat in a time of 23.5 seconds. Wilkins finished seventh in his heat in a time of 23.12 seconds. Of the three competitors, none advanced to the semi-final.

The heats for the men's 4 x 100 m relay took place on 6 August 2022. Montserrat finished sixth in their heat in a time of 41.47 seconds and they did not advance to the semi-final.

Athlete	Event	Heat		Semifinal		Final	
Athlete	Event	Result	Rank	Result	Rank	Result	Rank
Tevique Benjamin	100 m	11.06	6	did not advance			
Johmari Lee	100 m	11.03	6	did not advance			
Julius Morris	100 m	10.56	4	did not advance			
Julius Morris	200 m	21.57	7	did not advance			
Sanjay Weekes	200 m	23.50	7	did not advance			
Deshawn Wilkins	200 m	23.12	7	did not advance			
Johmari Lee; Julius Morris; Sanjay Weekes; Tevique Benjamin	4 × 100 m relay	41.47	6	—N/a		did not advance	
