= Montserrat at the 2018 Commonwealth Games =

- Flag of Montserrat
- CG code: MSR
- CGA: Montserrat Commonwealth Games Association

in Gold Coast, Australia 4 April 2018 – 15 April 2018
- Competitors: 7 in 1 sport
- Medals: Gold 0 Silver 0 Bronze 0 Total 0

Commonwealth Games appearances (overview)
- 1994; 1998; 2002; 2006; 2010; 2014; 2018; 2022; 2026; 2030

Montserrat competed at the 2018 Commonwealth Games in the Gold Coast, Australia from April 4 to April 15, 2018.

The delegation from Montserrat consisted of seven track and field athletes.

== Competitors ==
The following is the list of number of competitors participating at the Games per sport/discipline.

Sport	Men	Women	Total
Athletics	7	0	7
Total	7	0	7

== Athletics ==
Montserrat participated with 7 athletes (7 men).

Men
Track & road events

Athlete	Event	Heat		Semifinal		Final	
Athlete	Event	Result	Rank	Result	Rank	Result	Rank
Shernyl Burns	100 m	10.76	6	Did not advance			
Aj Lee	100 m	11.38	7	Did not advance			
Lester Ryan	100 m	10.90	6	Did not advance			
Johmari Lee	200 m	22.43	7	Did not advance			
Julius Morris	200 m	20.67	1 Q	20.69	3	Did not advance	

Field events

Athlete	Event	Qualification		Final	
Athlete	Event	Distance	Rank	Distance	Rank
Lavon Allen	Long jump	NM		Did not advance	
Darren Morson	Long jump	7.51	17	Did not advance	
