= Bryce Robinson =

American sprinter

Personal information
- Nationality: American
- Born: November 13, 1993 (age 32) Oklahoma City, Oklahoma
- Home town: Edmond, Oklahoma
- Education: Edmond Memorial High School
- Height: 5 ft 10 in (178 cm)
- Weight: 170 lb (77 kg)

Sport
- Sport: Athletics
- Event: 60 metres – 400 metres
- College team: Tulsa Golden Hurricane
- Club: Asics
Medal record
Men's athletics
Representing the United States
Summer Universiade
Silver medal – second place	2015 Gwangju	200 m
Pan American Games
Bronze medal – third place	2019 Lima	4×100 m relay

Bryce Robinson (born November 13, 1993) is an American sprinter. He competed collegiately for the University of Tulsa. He won a bronze medal in the 4×100 m relay at the 2019 Pan American Games.

== Personal bests ==
Outdoor

- 100 m: 9.99 (Storrs, Connecticut 2015)
- 200 m: 20.30 (Lubbock, Texas 2015)
- 300 m: 32.76 (Philadelphia 2022)
- 400 m: 45.62 (Fayetteville, Arkansas 2022)

Indoor

- 60 m: 6.51 (Albuquerque 2018)
- 200 m: 20.63 (Lincoln, Nebraska 2016)
- 300 m: 34.01 (Ostrava 2019)
- 400 m: 46.75 (New York City 2015)
