= 2022 World Athletics Indoor Championships – Women's 60 metres hurdles =

Women's 60 metres hurdles at the 2022 World Athletics Indoor Championships
- Venue: Štark Arena
- Dates: 19 March
- Competitors: 43 from 35 nations
- Winning time: 7.78

Medalists
gold medal	Cyréna Samba-Mayela	France
silver medal	Devynne Charlton	Bahamas
bronze medal	Gabriele Cunningham	United States

The women's 60 metres hurdles at the 2022 World Athletics Indoor Championships took place on 19 March 2022.

== Results ==
=== Heats ===
Qualification: First 3 in each heat (Q) and the next 6 fastest (q) advance to the Semi-Finals

The heats were started at 10:30.

Rank	Heat	Lane	Name	Nationality	Time	Notes
1	1	3	Cyréna Samba-Mayela	France	7.91	Q
2	3	7	Gabriele Cunningham	United States	7.93	Q
3	6	8	Noemi Zbären	Switzerland	7.95	Q, PB
4	1	2	Ditaji Kambundji	Switzerland	7.97	Q
5	3	3	Zoë Sedney	Netherlands	7.98	Q
6	3	8	Liz Clay	Australia	7.99	Q, PB
7	5	6	Devynne Charlton	Bahamas	8.02	Q
8	4	3	Alaysha Johnson	United States	8.03	Q
9	1	8	Sarah Lavin	Ireland	8.03	Q, PB
10	5	2	Anne Zagré	Belgium	8.04	Q, SB
11	3	1	Yoveinny Mota	Venezuela	8.05	q, NR
12	1	7	Mathilde Heltbech	Denmark	8.07	q, PB
13	2	2	Mette Graversgaard	Denmark	8.08	Q
14	6	6	Ebony Morrison	Liberia	8.09	Q, NR
15	3	2	Vanessa Clerveaux	Haiti	8.10	q, SB
15	6	4	Britany Anderson	Jamaica	8.10	Q
17	4	2	Michelle Harrison	Canada	8.11	Q, PB
18	2	3	Maayke Tjin-A-Lim	Netherlands	8.11	Q, PB
19	1	5	Teresa Errandonea	Spain	8.12	q, SB
20	4	8	Anamaria Nesteriuc	Romania	8.13	Q
21	2	4	Elisa Di Lazzaro	Italy	8.16	Q
22	3	5	Viktória Forster	Slovakia	8.17	q
23	6	3	Anna Plotitsyna	Ukraine	8.17	q
23	5	7	Julia Wennersten	Sweden	8.17	Q
25	5	5	Monika Zapalska	Germany	8.17	
26	6	2	Mulern Jean	Haiti	8.18	
27	1	1	Megan Marrs	Great Britain	8.19	
28	2	8	Ivana Lončarek	Croatia	8.19	
29	6	5	Natalia Christofi	Cyprus	8.20	
30	5	3	Klaudia Wojtunik	Poland	8.21	
31	1	4	Sidonie Fiadanantsoa	Madagascar	8.22	PB
32	2	7	Kreete Verlin	Estonia	8.23	
33	2	6	Danielle Williams	Jamaica	8.23	
34	4	5	Anja Lukić	Serbia	8.25	
35	2	5	Helena Jiranová	Czech Republic	8.25	
36	6	7	Elisavet Pesiridou	Greece	8.30	
37	5	4	Miho Suzuki	Japan	8.32	SB
38	3	6	Maribel Caicedo	Ecuador	8.33	
39	5	8	Ketiley Batista	Brazil	8.37	PB
40	1	6	Lui Lai Yiu	Hong Kong	8.45	SB
41	4	1	Vitoria Batista Alves	Brazil	8.65	
	4	4	Deya Erickson	British Virgin Islands	DNF	
	3	4	Xènia Benach	Spain	DQ	TR16.8
	4	6	Luca Kozák	Hungary	DNS	
	4	7	Andrea Vargas	Costa Rica	DNS	

=== Semifinals ===
First 2 in each heat (Q) and the next 2 fastest (q) advance to the Final

The heats were started at 18:15.

Rank	Heat	Lane	Name	Nationality	Time	Notes
1	1	4	Devynne Charlton	Bahamas	7.81	Q, NR
2	2	3	Cyréna Samba-Mayela	France	7.85	Q
2	1	8	Britany Anderson	Jamaica	7.85	Q
4	2	4	Ditaji Kambundji	Switzerland	7.89	Q, NR
5	3	5	Zoë Sedney	Netherlands	7.95	Q, PB
6	3	8	Sarah Lavin	Ireland	7.97	Q, PB
7	2	2	Yoveinny Mota	Venezuela	7.99	q, NR
8	3	3	Gabriele Cunningham	United States	8.00	q
9	1	5	Noemi Zbären	Switzerland	8.01	
10	2	8	Liz Clay	Australia	8.01	
11	2	6	Alaysha Johnson	United States	8.02	
12	3	6	Mette Graversgaard	Denmark	8.03	
13	1	6	Ebony Morrison	Liberia	8.07	NR
14	1	3	Anne Zagré	Belgium	8.08	
15	3	4	Michelle Harrison	Canada	8.09	PB
15	1	1	Mathilde Heltbech	Denmark	8.09	
17	3	7	Elisa Di Lazzaro	Italy	8.11	PB
18	1	7	Anamaria Nesteriuc	Romania	8.13	
19	2	5	Maayke Tjin-A-Lim	Netherlands	8.13	
20	3	1	Vanessa Clerveaux	Haiti	8.15	
21	1	2	Teresa Errandonea	Spain	8.16	
22	2	7	Julia Wennersten	Sweden	8.21	
23	2	1	Anna Plotitsyna	Ukraine	8.22	
24	3	2	Viktória Forster	Slovakia	8.22	

=== Final ===
The final was started on 19 March at 21:08

Rank	Lane	Name	Nationality	Time	Notes
1st place, gold medalist(s)	5	Cyréna Samba-Mayela	France	7.78	NR
2nd place, silver medalist(s)	4	Devynne Charlton	Bahamas	7.81	=NR
3rd place, bronze medalist(s)	2	Gabriele Cunningham	United States	7.87	
4	3	Britany Anderson	Jamaica	7.96	
5	1	Yoveinny Mota	Venezuela	8.05	
6	6	Zoë Sedney	Netherlands	8.07	
7	7	Sarah Lavin	Ireland	8.09	
	8	Ditaji Kambundji	Switzerland	DNF	
