= Athletics at the 2019 Pan American Games – Women's 100 metres hurdles =

Women's 100 metres hurdles at the 2019 Pan American Games
- Venue: Athletics Stadium
- Dates: August 7 – August 8
- Competitors: 15 from 10 nations
- Winning time: 12.82

Medalists
Gold medal	Andrea Vargas	Costa Rica
Silver medal	Chanel Brissett	United States
Bronze medal	Megan Simmonds	Jamaica

The women's 100 metres hurdles competition of the athletics events at the 2019 Pan American Games will take place between the 7 and 8 of August at the 2019 Pan American Games Athletics Stadium. The defending Pan American Games champion is Queen Harrison from the United States.

== Summary ==
Over the first hurdle, Sharika Nelvis was first, barely ahead of Andrea Vargas. Over each hurdle, Nelvis gained inches over Vargas. By the sixth hurdle, the two had a stride over the field, with Vanessa Clerveaux battling Megan Simmonds for third. Going into the seventh hurdle, things began to change. Nelvis started to get awkward approaching the hurdle. She still cleared but her balance was off, Vargas continued smoothly into the lead. Nelvis continued swinging her arms and stayed close to Vargas. Clerveaux struggled, while Simmonds was hitting the eighth hurdle, collegian Chanel Brissett pulled even with Simmonds. Nelvis hit the ninth hurdle and lost her step, listing to the left going into the final barrier. Vargas continued to gold, Brissett edging Simmonds for silver while Nelvis barely got over the tenth, finishing in seventh.

== Records ==
Prior to this competition, the existing world and Pan American Games records were as follows:

World record	Kendra Harrison (USA)	12.20	London, Great Britain	July 22, 2016
Pan American Games record	Queen Harrison (USA)	12.52	Toronto, Canada	July 21, 2015

== Schedule ==
Date	Time	Round
August 7, 2019	15:00	Semifinal
August 8, 2019	16:45	Final

== Results ==
All times shown are in seconds.

KEY:	q	Fastest non-qualifiers	Q	Qualified	NR	National record	PB	Personal best	SB	Seasonal best	DQ	Disqualified

=== Semifinal ===
Qualification: First 3 in each heat (Q) and next 2 fastest (q) qualified for the final. The results were as follows:

Wind:
Heat 1: +0.1 m/s, Heat 2: +0.5 m/s

Rank	Heat	Name	Nationality	Time	Notes
1	1	Andrea Vargas	Costa Rica	12.75	Q, NR
2	1	Sharika Nelvis	United States	12.85	Q
3	2	Yanique Thompson	Jamaica	12.90	Q
4	2	Pedrya Seymour	Bahamas	12.94	Q
5	2	Vanessa Clerveaux	Haiti	12.99	Q
6	2	Chanel Brissett	United States	13.08	q
7	1	Megan Simmonds	Jamaica	13.10	Q
8	1	Genesis Romero	Venezuela	13.18	q
9	2	Diana Bazalar	Peru	13.25	NR
10	1	Devynne Charlton	Bahamas	13.49	
11	1	Maribel Caicedo	Ecuador	13.53	
12	1	Keira Christie-Galloway	Canada	13.57	
13	2	Yoveinny Mota	Venezuela	13.60	
	1	Jenea McCammon	Guyana	DNF	
	2	Phylicia George	Canada	DNS	

=== Final ===
The results were as follows:

Rank	Lane	Name	Nationality	Time	Notes
1st place, gold medalist(s)	4	Andrea Vargas	Costa Rica	12.82	
2nd place, silver medalist(s)	2	Chanel Brissett	United States	12.99	
3rd place, bronze medalist(s)	9	Megan Simmonds	Jamaica	13.01	
4	6	Yanique Thompson	Jamaica	13.11	
5	7	Pedrya Seymour	Bahamas	13.12	
6	8	Vanessa Clerveaux	Haiti	13.17	
7	5	Sharika Nelvis	United States	13.23	
8	3	Genesis Romero	Venezuela	13.44	
