= Athletics at the 2019 Pan American Games – Men's 4 × 100 metres relay =

Men's 4 × 100 metres relay at the 2019 Pan American Games
- Venue: Athletics Stadium
- Dates: August 9
- Competitors: 36 from 9 nations
- Winning time: 38.27

Medalists
Gold medal	Rodrigo do Nascimento; Jorge Vides; Derick Silva; Paulo André de Oliveira	Brazil
Silver medal	Jerod Elcock; Keston Bledman; Akanni Hislop; Kyle Greaux	Trinidad and Tobago
Bronze medal	Jarret Eaton; Cravon Gillespie; Bryce Robinson; Mike Rodgers	United States

The men's 4 × 100 metres relay competition of the athletics events at the 2019 Pan American Games took place on the 9 of August at the 2019 Pan American Games Athletics Stadium. The defending Pan American Games champion is United States.

== Summary ==
The semi-finals were cancelled as the race scratched down to a 9 lane final. Brazil's first leg, Rodrigo do Nascimento blazed the turn to give them a clear lead at the first handoff while the rest of the staggers remained true. Down the backstretch, Trinidad and Tobago's Olympic double Olympic medal relay veteran Keston Bledman and Jamaica's 2015 relay world champion Rasheed Dwyer put their teams into contention. Cravon Gillespie ran a strong backstretch and Bryce Robinson likewise a strong turn to put USA into contention. A strong final handoff for Brazil to 100 silver medalist Paulo André de Oliveira and Brazil was gone to take gold. Trinidad made a smooth handoff from Akanni Hislop to Kyle Greaux and would have no challenge for silver after Jamaica's Oshane Bailey and USA's 100 gold medalist Mike Rodgers had to look back for their handoff. Way too late to challenge Trinidad, Rodgers outran Canada's Mobolade Ajomale to take bronze.

== Records ==
Prior to this competition, the existing world and Pan American Games records were as follows:

World record	Jamaica	36.84	London, United Kingdom	August 11, 2012
Pan American Games record	Antigua and Barbuda	38.14	Toronto, Canada	July 24, 2015

== Schedule ==
Date	Time	Round
August 9, 2019	19:05	Final

== Results ==
All times shown are in seconds.

KEY:	q	Fastest non-qualifiers	Q	Qualified	NR	National record	PB	Personal best	SB	Seasonal best	DQ	Disqualified

=== Final ===
The results were as follows

Rank	Lane	Nation	Name	Time	Notes
1st place, gold medalist(s)	3	Brazil	Rodrigo do Nascimento, Jorge Vides, Derick Silva, Paulo André de Oliveira	38.27	
2nd place, silver medalist(s)	8	Trinidad and Tobago	Jerod Elcock, Keston Bledman, Akanni Hislop, Kyle Greaux	38.46	SB
3rd place, bronze medalist(s)	4	United States	Jarret Eaton, Cravon Gillespie, Bryce Robinson, Mike Rodgers	38.79	
4	7	Canada	Gavin Smellie, Jerome Blake, Brendon Rodney, Mobolade Ajomale	39.00	
5	5	Jamaica	Andre Ewers, Rasheed Dwyer, Julian Forte, Oshane Bailey	39.01	
6	6	Dominican Republic	Christopher Valdez, Mayobanex de Óleo, José González Soto, Yancarlos Martínez	39.15	
7	2	Cuba	Harlyn Pérez, Roberto Skyers, Reynier Mena, José Luis Gaspar	39.19	SB
8	9	Venezuela	Alberto Aguilar, Abdel Kalil, Alexis Nieves, Rafael Vásquez Leon	39.73	
9	1	Peru	Frank Sanchez Mozombite, Luis Iriarte, Mauricio Garrido, Andy Martínez	41.19	
