= Athletics at the 2019 Pan American Games – Women's 4 × 100 metres relay =

Women's 4 × 100 metres relay at the 2019 Pan American Games
- Venue: Athletics Stadium
- Dates: August 9
- Competitors: 36 from 9 nations
- Winning time: 43.04

Medalists
Gold medal	Andressa Fidelis; Vitória Cristina Rosa; Lorraine Martins; Rosângela Santos	Brazil
Silver medal	Khamica Bingham; Crystal Emmanuel; Ashlan Best; Leya Buchanan	Canada
Bronze medal	Chanel Brissett; Twanisha Terry; Shania Collins; Lynna Irby	United States

The women's 4 × 100 metres relay competition of the athletics events at the 2019 Pan American Games took place on 9 of August at the 2019 Pan American Games Athletics Stadium. The defending Pan American Games champion is United States.

== Summary ==
USA tried to use the advantage of USC teammates Chanel Brissett and Twanisha Terry on their first two legs. It didn't work because the two teammates didn't hand off at USC, USA found themselves in dead last at the first exchange. The lost their stagger advantage to Brazil on their inside, while on the far outside, Trinidad and Tobago and Canada with returning 2015 bronze medalists Khamica Bingham and Crystal Emmanuel were out ahead. Ecuador took too long to pass at the first exchange and were disqualified. Terry did gain some ground back from Brazil's Vitória Cristina Rosa on her leg. Brazil was first to make the second pass, with Trinidad arriving ahead of Canada but making a slow handoff from veteran Michelle-Lee Ahye to Mauricia Prieto. Peru and Bahamas disappeared at the second handoff. Shania Collins burned the turn for USA, catching up to within a step of Lorraine Martins for Brazil by the third handoff, ahead of Trinidad and Canada. It was a looking like battle as Lynna Irby would try to pull in Brazilian veteran Rosângela Santos but Irby's 400 speed was no match for Santos. Instead Canada's Leya Buchanan ran past Trinidad's veteran Kelly-Ann Baptiste and nipped Irby at the line for silver.

== Records ==
Prior to this competition, the existing world and Pan American Games records were as follows:

World record	United States	40.82	London, United Kingdom	August 10, 2012
Pan American Games record	United States	42.58	Toronto, Canada	July 25, 2015

== Schedule ==
Date	Time	Round
August 9, 2019	18:55	Final

== Results ==
All times shown are in seconds.

KEY:	q	Fastest non-qualifiers	Q	Qualified	NR	National record	PB	Personal best	SB	Seasonal best	DQ	Disqualified

=== Final ===
The results were as follows

Rank	Lane	Nation	Name	Time	Notes
1st place, gold medalist(s)	4	Brazil	Andressa Fidelis, Vitória Cristina Rosa, Lorraine Martins, Rosângela Santos	43.04	SB
2nd place, silver medalist(s)	8	Canada	Khamica Bingham, Crystal Emmanuel, Ashlan Best, Leya Buchanan	43.37	SB
3rd place, bronze medalist(s)	5	United States	Chanel Brissett, Twanisha Terry, Shania Collins, Lynna Irby	43.39	
4	6	Jamaica	Schillonie Calvert, Natasha Morrison, Ronda Whyte, Shashalee Forbes	43.74	
5	1	Venezuela	Nediam Vargas, Andrea Purica, Génesis Romero, Aries Sánchez	44.73	
	3	Bahamas	Devynne Charlton, Brianne Bethel, Pedrya Seymour, Tynia Gaither	DNF	
	2	Peru	Paola Mautino, Diana Bazalar, Giara Garate, Triana Alonso	DNF	
	6	Ecuador	Ángela Tenorio, Gabriela Suárez, Marina Poroso, Maribel Caicedo	DSQ	
	7	Trinidad and Tobago	Kamaria Durant, Michelle-Lee Ahye, Mauricia Prieto, Kelly-Ann Baptiste	DSQ	
