= Jerod Elcock =

Trinidadian athlete (born 1998)

Personal information
- Born: 30 July 1998 (age 27) Caroni, Trinidad
- Education: El Dorado East High School
- Height: 1.88 m (6 ft 2 in)
- Weight: 96 kg (212 lb)

Sport
- Sport: Track and field
- Event(s): 100 metres, 200 metres
- College team: Butler Community College
Medal record
Men's Athletics
Representing Trinidad and Tobago
Commonwealth Games
Silver medal – second place	2022 Birmingham	4×100 m relay
Pan American Games
Silver medal – second place	2019 Lima	4×100 m relay
NACAC Championships
Silver medal – second place	2022 Freeport	4×100 m relay
CARIFTA Games (U18)
Silver medal – second place	2015 Basseterre	4×100 m relay
Pan American U20 Championships
Bronze medal – third place	2017 Trujillo	4x100m

Jerod Elcock (born 30 July 1998) is a Trinidad and Tobago sprinter. He won a silver medal in the 4 × 100 m relay at the 2019 Pan American Games. He also won a silver medal in the same event at the 2022 Commonwealth Games. At the 2022 World Athletics Indoor Championships, he competed in the 60 metres, where he placed 6th in the final.

He competed for Butler Community College in El Dorado, Kansas, where he was named the 2022 NJCAA Outdoor Track and Field Athlete of the Year.

== Personal bests ==
Outdoor

- 100 metres – 10.03 (Port-of-Spain 2022)
- 200 metres – 20.64 (El Dorado, KS 2022)
- 400 metres – 47.21 (Arima 2017)

Indoor

- 60 metres – 6.60 (Pittsburg, KS 2022)
- 200 metres – 21.85 (Topeka, KS 2021)
