= Athletics at the 2018 Commonwealth Games – Men's 4 × 400 metres relay =

Men's 4 × 400 metres relay at the 2018 Commonwealth Games
- Venue: Carrara Stadium
- Dates: 13 April (heats); 14 April (final)
- Nations: 13
- Winning time: 3:01.78

Medalists
gold medal	Leaname Maotoanong; Baboloki Thebe; Onkabetse Nkobolo; Isaac Makwala	Botswana
silver medal	O'Jay Ferguson; Teray Smith; Stephen Newbold; Alonzo Russell; Michael Mathieu; Ramon Miller	Bahamas
bronze medal	Jermaine Gayle; Demish Gaye; Jamari Rose; Javon Francis; Peter Matthews	Jamaica

The men's 4 × 400 metres relay at the 2018 Commonwealth Games, as part of the athletics programme, took place in the Carrara Stadium on 13 and 14 April 2018.

== Records ==
Prior to this competition, the existing world and Games records were as follows:

World record	United States (Andrew Valmon, Quincy Watts, Butch Reynolds, Michael Johnson)	2:54.29	Stuttgart, Germany	22 August 1993
Games record	Jamaica (Michael McDonald, Roxbert Martin, Greg Haughton, Davian Clarke)	2:59.03	Kuala Lumpur, Malaysia	21 September 1998

== Schedule ==
The schedule was as follows:

Date	Time	Round
Friday 13 April 2018	12:05	First round
Saturday 14 April 2018	17:07	Final

All times are Australian Eastern Standard Time (UTC+10)

== Results ==
=== First round ===
The first round consisted of two heats. The three fastest teams per heat (plus two fastest losers) advanced to the final.

Heat 1

Rank	Nation	Athletes	Result	Notes	Qual.
1	Botswana	Leaname Maotoanong; Baboloki Thebe; Onkabetse Nkobolo; Isaac Makwala	3:05.71	SB	Q
2	Kenya	Collins Omae Gichana; Mike Mokamba Nyang'au; Peter Mwai Ndichu; Boniface Ontuga Mweresa	3:13.52		Q
3	Fiji	Samuela Railoa; Aaron Powell; Kameli Sauduadua; Petero Veitaqomaki	3:19.19		Q
–	England	Matthew Hudson-Smith; Dwayne Cowan; Rabah Yousif; Jack Green	DNF	Note	
–	Nigeria	Orukpe Eraiyokan; Samson Nathaniel; Salihu Isah; Chidi Okezie	DQ	R 163.3a	
–	Mozambique		DNS		

Heat 2

Rank	Nation	Athletes	Result	Notes	Qual.
1	Jamaica	Peter Matthews; Demish Gaye; Jamari Rose; Javon Francis	3:03.97		Q
2	India	Jeevan Karekoppa Suresh; Jacob Amoj; Mohammad Anas Yahiya; Arokia Rajiv	3:04.05		Q
3	Bahamas	O'Jay Ferguson; Alonzo Russell; Michael Mathieu; Ramon Miller	3:04.62		Q
4	Trinidad and Tobago	Renny Quow; Deon Lendore; Lalonde Gordon; Machel Cedenio	3:05.84		q
5	Turks and Caicos Islands	Angelo Garland; Ifeanyi Otuonye; Devante Gardiner; Frantzley Benjamin	3:13.70	NR	q
–	Australia	Murray Goodwin; Daniel Mowen; Joshua Ralph; Steven Solomon	DQ	R 170.20	
–	Papua New Guinea		DNS		

=== Final ===
The medals were determined in the final.

Rank	Nation	Athletes	Result	Notes
1st place, gold medalist(s)	Botswana	Leaname Maotoanong; Baboloki Thebe; Onkabetse Nkobolo; Isaac Makwala	3:01.78	SB
2nd place, silver medalist(s)	Bahamas	O'Jay Ferguson; Teray Smith; Stephen Newbold; Alonzo Russell	3:01.92	SB
3rd place, bronze medalist(s)	Jamaica	Jermaine Gayle; Demish Gaye; Jamari Rose; Javon Francis	3:01.97	SB
4	Trinidad and Tobago	Deon Lendore; Jereem Richards; Renny Quow; Machel Cedenio	3:02.85	
5	Fiji	Samuela Railoa; Aaron Powell; Kameli Sauduadua; Petero Veitaqomaki	3:15.10	SB
6	Turks and Caicos Islands	Angelo Garland; Ifeanyi Otuonye; Frantzley Benjamin; Devante Gardiner	3:16.39	
–	India	Dharun Ayyasamy; Jacob Amoj; Mohammad Anas Yahiya; Arokia Rajiv	DNF	Note
–	Kenya	Collins Omae Gichana; Boniface Ontuga Mweresa; Aron Kipchumba Koech; Nicholas Kiplagat Bett	DQ	R 170.20
