= Athletics at the 2018 Commonwealth Games – Men's 200 metres =

Men's 200 metres at the 2018 Commonwealth Games
- Venue: Carrara Stadium
- Dates: 10 April (heats); 11 April (semifinals); 12 April (final)
- Competitors: 70 from 43 nations
- Winning time: 20.12

Medalists
gold medal	Jereem Richards	Trinidad and Tobago
silver medal	Aaron Brown	Canada
bronze medal	Leon Reid	Northern Ireland

The men's 200 metres at the 2018 Commonwealth Games, as part of the athletics programme, took place in the Carrara Stadium between 10 and 12 April 2018.

In the final, it initially appeared that England's Zharnel Hughes had edged Jereem Richards of Trinidad and Tobago at the line, recording the same time of 20.12 seconds. However, upon review Hughes was disqualified for impeding Richards (running in the next lane) using his arm. Richards was declared Commonwealth Games champion, with Canada's Aaron Brown and Leon Reid of Northern Ireland filling out the podium.

== Records ==
Prior to this competition, the existing world and Games records were as follows:

World record	Usain Bolt (JAM)	19.19	Berlin, Germany	20 August 2009
Games record	Frankie Fredericks (NAM)	19.97	Victoria, Canada	26 August 1994

== Schedule ==
The schedule was as follows:

Date	Time	Round
Tuesday 10 April 2018	13:05	First round
Wednesday 11 April 2018	20:50	Semifinals
Thursday 12 April 2018	21:56	Final

All times are Australian Eastern Standard Time (UTC+10)

== Results ==
=== First round ===
The first round consisted of nine heats. The two fastest competitors per heat (plus six fastest losers) advanced to the semifinals.

Heat 1

Rank	Lane	Name	Reaction Time	Result	Notes	Qual.
1	7	Warren Weir (JAM)	0.185	20.60		Q
2	4	Leon Reid (NIR)	0.132	20.73		Q
3	3	Emmanuel Arowolo (NGR)	0.135	20.99		q
4	2	Harold Houston (BER)	0.132	21.67		
5	8	Jonah Harris (NRU)	0.160	21.96	NR	
6	1	Nazmie-Lee Marai (PNG)	0.150	22.14		
7	6	Mohamed Othman (SLE)	0.164	22.22		
–	5	Jeremy Dodson (SAM)	0.142	DNF		
				Wind: -0.4 m/s		

Heat 2

Rank	Lane	Name	Reaction Time	Result	Notes	Qual.
1	5	Aaron Brown (CAN)	0.146	20.59		Q
2	4	Kenroy Anderson (JAM)	0.180	20.89		Q
3	8	Adama Jammeh (GAM)	0.153	21.11		
4	2	Pius Adome (UGA)	0.149	21.39		
5	7	Theo Piniau (PNG)	0.155	21.76		
6	1	Vivian Williams (SLE)	0.148	21.89		
7	6	Sam Dawkins (JER)	0.198	21.91	NR	
–	3	Mauriel Carty (AIA)	0.202	DNF		
				Wind: -1.0 m/s		

Heat 3

Rank	Lane	Name	Reaction Time	Result	Notes	Qual.
1	5	Rasheed Dwyer (JAM)	0.177	20.78		Q
2	6	Martin Owusu-Antwi (GHA)	0.170	21.02	SB	Q
3	8	Mark Otieno Odhiambo (KEN)	0.147	21.03		q
4	4	Marie Jean-Yann de Grace (MRI)	0.149	21.18		
5	2	Devante Gardiner (TCA)	0.139	21.79		
6	3	Leeroy Henriette (SEY)	0.122	21.97		
7	7	Aaron Powell (FIJ)	0.168	22.05		
–	1	Shavez Hart (BAH)		DNS		
				Wind: -1.4 m/s		

Heat 4

Rank	Lane	Name	Reaction Time	Result	Notes	Qual.
1	6	Julius Morris (MSR)	0.150	20.67		Q
2	1	Teray Smith (BAH)	0.170	20.82		Q
3	7	Jared Jarvis (ANT)	0.162	21.21		
4	2	Nicholas Deshong (BAR)	0.148	21.26		
5	8	Thandaza Zwane (SWZ)	0.164	21.55		
6	4	Ebrahima Camara (GAM)	0.151	21.58		
7	5	Rohan Marcelle (GRN)	0.147	21.58		
8	3	Brandon Jones (BIZ)	0.172	21.66		
				Wind: -1.2 m/s		

Heat 5

Rank	Lane	Name	Reaction Time	Result	Notes	Qual.
1	8	Jereem Richards (TTO)	0.153	20.33		Q
2	3	Alex Hartmann (AUS)	0.136	20.66		Q
3	5	Sibusiso Matsenjwa (SWZ)	0.164	20.81		q
4	2	Sharry Dodin (SEY)	0.192	21.38	PB	
5	6	Jerai Torres (GIB)	0.154	22.23		
–	4	Mosito Lehata (LES)		DNS		
–	7	Kimorie Shearman (SVG)		DNS		
				Wind: -1.5 m/s		

Heat 6

Rank	Lane	Name	Reaction Time	Result	Notes	Qual.
1	3	Clarence Munyai (RSA)	0.150	20.95		Q
2	7	Richard Kilty (ENG)	0.135	21.08		Q
3	6	Nathan Farinha (TTO)	0.159	21.62		
4	5	Mitchel Davis (DMA)	0.156	21.75		
5	2	Jonathan Celestin (LCA)	0.159	21.92		
–	8	Kemroy Cupid (SVG)	0.171	DNF		
–	4	Shane Brathwaite (BAR)		DQ	R 162.8	
				Wind: -0.7 m/s		

Heat 7

Rank	Lane	Name	Reaction Time	Result	Notes	Qual.
1	8	Anaso Jobodwana (RSA)	0.130	20.89		Q
2	5	Joseph Millar (NZL)	0.147	21.10		Q
3	6	Mike Mokamba (KEN)	0.182	21.14		
4	3	Winston George (GUY)	0.192	21.19		
5	1	Ali Khamis Gulam (TAN)	0.161	21.43		
6	2	Abdoulie Asim (GAM)	0.169	21.79		
7	7	Kelvin Masoe (SAM)	0.149	21.98	PB	
–	4	Pako Seribe (BOT)	0.148	DNF		
				Wind: +0.3 m/s		

Heat 8

Rank	Lane	Name	Reaction Time	Result	Notes	Qual.
1	8	Kyle Greaux (TTO)	0.154	20.67		Q
2	5	Burkheart Ellis (BAR)	0.164	21.02		Q
3	1	Tahir Walsh (ANT)	0.145	21.10		q
4	2	Wesley Logorava (PNG)	0.159	22.00		
5	6	Bradly Toa (VAN)	0.203	22.43		
–	4	Sean Crowie (SHN)		DNS		
–	3	Karabo Mothibi (BOT)		DNS		
–	7	Dylan Sicobo (SEY)		DNS		
				Wind: -0.4 m/s		

Heat 9

Rank	Lane	Name	Reaction Time	Result	Notes	Qual.
1	2	Zharnel Hughes (ENG)	0.145	20.34		Q
2	6	Sydney Siame (ZAM)	0.160	20.65		Q
3	5	Bismark Boateng (CAN)	0.147	20.80	SB	q
4	4	Joseph Amoah (GHA)	0.169	20.84		q
5	3	Peter Ndichu (KEN)	0.150	21.27		
6	8	Kyle Webb (BER)	0.167	21.73		
7	7	Johmari Lee (MSR)	0.173	22.43		
8	1	Saymon Rijo (AIA)	0.167	23.17		
				Wind: -0.4 m/s		

=== Semifinals ===
Three semi-finals were held. The two fastest competitors per semi (plus two fastest losers) advanced to the final.

Semifinal 1

Rank	Lane	Name	Reaction Time	Result	Notes	Qual.
1	6	Aaron Brown (CAN)	0.143	20.18		Q
2	3	Clarence Munyai (RSA)	0.139	20.36		Q
3	5	Sydney Siame (ZAM)	0.160	20.51		q
4	4	Warren Weir (JAM)	0.185	20.62		q
5	7	Richard Kilty (ENG)	0.125	20.67		
6	8	Burkheart Ellis (BAR)	0.147	20.79		
7	1	Joseph Amoah (GHA)	0.149	20.99		
8	2	Emmanuel Arowolo (NGR)	0.146	21.25		
				Wind: 0.0 m/s		

Semifinal 2

Rank	Lane	Name	Reaction Time	Result	Notes	Qual.
1	6	Zharnel Hughes (ENG)	0.131	20.37		Q
2	4	Kyle Greaux (TTO)	0.159	20.66		Q
3	5	Alex Hartmann (AUS)	0.134	20.76		
4	2	Sibusiso Matsenjwa (SWZ)	0.158	21.16		
5	1	Mark Odhiambo (KEN)	0.150	21.29		
6	7	Martin Owusu-Antwi (GHA)	0.151	25.95		
–	8	Kenroy Anderson (JAM)	0.158	DQ	R 163.3a	
–	3	Anaso Jobodwana (RSA)		DQ	R 162.8	
				Wind: 0.0 m/s		

Semifinal 3

Rank	Lane	Name	Reaction Time	Result	Notes	Qual.
1	6	Jereem Richards (TTO)	0.147	20.41		Q
2	5	Leon Reid (NIR)	0.136	20.61		Q
3	4	Julius Morris (MSR)	0.147	20.69		
4	8	Teray Smith (BAH)	0.150	20.71		
5	3	Rasheed Dwyer (JAM)	0.144	20.82		
6	7	Joseph Millar (NZL)	0.144	21.01		
7	1	Bismark Boateng (CAN)	0.138	21.06		
8	2	Tahir Walsh (ANT)	0.151	21.13		
				Wind: +0.3 m/s		

=== Final ===
The medals were determined in the final.

Rank	Lane	Name	Reaction Time	Result	Notes
1st place, gold medalist(s)	4	Jereem Richards (TTO)	0.133	20.12	
2nd place, silver medalist(s)	3	Aaron Brown (CAN)	0.144	20.34	
3rd place, bronze medalist(s)	7	Leon Reid (NIR)	0.133	20.55	
4	6	Clarence Munyai (RSA)	0.140	20.58	
5	2	Sydney Siame (ZAM)	0.171	20.62	
6	8	Kyle Greaux (TTO)	0.173	20.63	
7	1	Warren Weir (JAM)	0.153	20.71	
–	5	Zharnel Hughes (ENG)	0.143	DQ; ~~20.12~~	R 163.2
				Wind: +0.9 m/s	
