= Athletics at the 2018 Commonwealth Games – Men's long jump =

Men's long jump at the 2018 Commonwealth Games
- Venue: Carrara Stadium
- Dates: 10 April (qualifying round); 11 April (final)
- Competitors: 28 from 20 nations
- Winning distance: 8.41 m GR

Medalists
gold medal	Luvo Manyonga	South Africa
silver medal	Henry Frayne	Australia
bronze medal	Ruswahl Samaai	South Africa

The men's long jump at the 2018 Commonwealth Games, as part of the athletics programme, took place in the Carrara Stadium on 10 and 11 April 2018.

== Records ==
Prior to this competition, the existing world and Games records were as follows:

World record	Mike Powell (USA)	8.95 m	Tokyo, Japan	30 August 1991
Games record	Fabrice Lapierre (AUS)	8.30 m	New Delhi, India	9 October 2010

== Schedule ==
The schedule was as follows:

Date	Time	Round
Tuesday 10 April 2018	11:30	Qualification
Wednesday 11 April 2018	20:32	Final

All times are Australian Eastern Standard Time (UTC+10)

== Results ==
=== Qualifying round ===
Across two groups, those who jumped ≥7.90 m (Q) or at least the 12 best performers (q) advanced to the final.

Rank	Group	Name	#1	#2	#3	Result	Notes	Qual.
1	B	Henry Frayne (AUS)	8.34 +1.1 m/s			8.34	GR, PB	Q
2	A	Ruswahl Samaai (RSA)	8.06 +1.2 m/s			8.06		Q
3	A	Ifeanyichukwu Otuonye (TCA)	8.03 +0.1 m/s			8.03	PB	Q
4	A	Dan Bramble (ENG)	7.60 +1.0 m/s	8.02 +1.3 m/s		8.02	=SB	Q
5	B	Damar Forbes (JAM)	7.93 +0.5 m/s			7.93		Q
6	B	Luvo Manyonga (RSA)	7.91 -0.7 m/s			7.91		Q
7	A	Tyrone Smith (BER)	7.52; 0.0 m/s	7.89 -0.2 m/s	–	7.89		q
8	B	Tajay Gayle (JAM)	5.68 w +2.9 m/s	7.06 +0.6 m/s	7.88 +1.1 m/s	7.88		q
9	A	Marcel Mayack (CMR)	7.73 +0.8 m/s	7.70 +0.7 m/s	7.84 +1.0 m/s	7.84		q
10	B	D.A.G. Janaka Wimalasari (SRI)	7.56 +0.5 m/s	7.70 +1.5 m/s	7.84 +0.8 m/s	7.84		q
11	B	Chris Mitrevski (AUS)	7.75 +1.8 m/s	7.82 +2.0 m/s	7.73 +0.7 m/s	7.82		q
12	A	Fabrice Lapierre (AUS)	7.54 -0.1 m/s	x +0.9 m/s	7.76 +1.4 m/s	7.76		q
13	A	Shawn-D Thompson (JAM)	7.55 +0.4 m/s	7.69 +1.1 m/s	7.30 +1.2 m/s	7.69		
14	A	Adam McMullen (NIR)	7.66 +0.7 m/s	7.43 +0.8 m/s	x +0.9 m/s	7.66		
15	A	David Registe (DMA)	7.40 +0.2 m/s	7.25 +1.3 m/s	7.59 +1.8 m/s	7.59		
16	A	Bethwel Lagat (KEN)	7.49 +0.7 m/s	7.45 +0.1 m/s	7.58 -0.4 m/s	7.58		
17	A	Darren Morson (MSR)	7.51 +0.7 m/s	7.21 +0.3 m/s	x +1.4 m/s	7.51	NR	
18	A	Ian Grech (MLT)	7.22 +0.5 m/s	x +0.6 m/s	7.43 +0.7 m/s	7.43	PB	
19	B	Jonathan Drack (MRI)	7.33 +0.9 m/s	7.37 +0.8 m/s	7.22 +1.1 m/s	7.37	=SB	
20	B	Melvin Echard (GRN)	x -0.5 m/s	7.29 +0.4 m/s	7.07 +0.8 m/s	7.29		
21	B	Emanuel Archibald (GUY)	x 0.0 m/s	7.24 +1.4 m/s	7.24 -0.9 m/s	7.24		
22	A	Anthony Mwanga (TAN)	7.20 +1.8 m/s	6.83 +1.1 m/s	6.83 +0.7 m/s	7.20	PB	
23	A	Peniel Richard (PNG)	6.79 +0.6 m/s	6.84 +1.6 m/s	6.98 +0.6 m/s	6.98	SB	
24	B	Andrew Cassar Torreggiani (MLT)	x +0.5 m/s	6.65 -0.1 m/s	6.87 +1.2 m/s	6.87		
25	B	Eugene Vollmer (FIJ)	6.85 +0.8 m/s	6.67; 0.0 m/s	6.62 -0.1 m/s	6.85		
–	B	Lavon Allen (MSR)	x +1.3 m/s	–	–	NM		
–	B	Carl Morgan (CAY)	x +1.2 m/s	x +0.7 m/s	x +0.2 m/s	NM		
–	B	Bavon Sylvain (DMA)	x +0.9 m/s	x +1.2 m/s	–	NM		

=== Final ===
The medals were determined in the final.

Rank	Name	#1	#2	#3	#4	#5	#6	Result	Notes
1st place, gold medalist(s)	Luvo Manyonga (RSA)	8.24 +1.2 m/s	8.21 +0.4 m/s	x +0.7 m/s	8.35 +0.5 m/s	x +0.9 m/s	8.41 +0.6 m/s	8.41	GR
2nd place, silver medalist(s)	Henry Frayne (AUS)	8.00; 0.0 m/s	8.33 +0.8 m/s	x +0.5 m/s	8.08 +0.2 m/s	x +1.2 m/s	x +1.1 m/s	8.33	
3rd place, bronze medalist(s)	Ruswahl Samaai (RSA)	8.06 +0.6 m/s	8.22 +0.2 m/s	8.17 +0.9 m/s	7.89 +1.0 m/s	8.18 +0.7 m/s	8.08 +0.7 m/s	8.22	
4	Tajay Gayle (JAM)	7.92 +0.6 m/s	7.98 +0.4 m/s	8.12 -0.1 m/s	x +0.3 m/s	7.94 +0.3 m/s	8.00 +0.6 m/s	8.12	PB
5	Dan Bramble (ENG)	7.58 +0.9 m/s	7.56 +0.4 m/s	7.94 +0.1 m/s	7.72 +0.9 m/s	7.76 +0.6 m/s	7.41 +0.9 m/s	7.94	
6	Chris Mitrevski (AUS)	7.50 +0.9 m/s	7.66 +0.8 m/s	7.81 +0.7 m/s	7.43 +0.6 m/s	7.81 +0.5 m/s	7.90 +0.8 m/s	7.90	
7	D.A.G. Janaka Wimalasari (SRI)	x +0.6 m/s	7.52 +0.9 m/s	7.89 +0.5 m/s	7.50 +0.3 m/s	x +0.4 m/s	x +0.2 m/s	7.89	
8	Damar Forbes (JAM)	x +0.4 m/s	7.88 +0.9 m/s	7.86 +0.2 m/s	7.60 +0.3 m/s	x +0.4 m/s	7.69 +0.7 m/s	7.88	
9	Ifeanyichukwu Otuonye (TCA)	7.45 +0.2 m/s	7.70 +1.0 m/s	7.80 +0.7 m/s	—N/a			7.80	
10	Tyrone Smith (BER)	x +0.8 m/s	7.79 +0.3 m/s	x +0.1 m/s	—N/a			7.79	
11	Marcel Mayack (CMR)	7.36 +0.8 m/s	7.61 +0.9 m/s	7.70 +0.5 m/s	—N/a			7.70	
12	Fabrice Lapierre (AUS)	x +0.5 m/s	7.56 +0.7 m/s	x +0.2 m/s	—N/a			7.56	
