= Udo Edidiong =

Nigerian sprinter (born 1999)

Personal information
- Full name: Udo Edidiong Okon
- Born: 31 January 1999 (age 27)

Sport
- Sport: Athletics
- Event: Sprint

Achievements and titles
- Personal best: 400m: 44.91 (2026)
Medal record
Men's athletics
Representing Nigeria
Commonwealth Games
| Bronze medal – third place | 2026 Glasgow | 4×400m Mixed |

Udo Edidiong Okon (born 31 January 1999) is a Nigerian sprinter. He won the Nigerian Championships over 400 metres in 2022.

== Biography ==
From Ikot Ekpene, Nigeria, Udo won the Nigerian Athletics Championships over 400 metres in Benin City in June 2022. He accepted a scholarship to attend Ohio State University, but had to overcome loss in February 2025 when both his parents died within seven days. Despite that, Udo qualified for the individual 400 metres at the 2025 NCAA Indoor Championships.

Udo began his career as an 800 metres runner before switching to the 400 metres, later saying he felt competing in the 800 metres had been a mistake and that the 400 metres was the event in which he found success. He has a personal best of 1:49.87 in the 800 metres, set in 2021 at Samuel Ogbemudia Stadium in Benin City.

Having qualified to run at the 2026 NCAA Indoor Championships in March, in May 2026, he ran a new personal best of 44.91 at the Big Ten Outdoor Championships. That month, Udo ran 45.39 seconds at the NCAA East Regionals. Despite being unable to compete at the Nigeria trials due to his commitments in the United States, Udo was selected to represent Nigeria at the 2026 Commonwealth Games. Competing at the Games in Glasgow, Scotland in July, he qualified for the final with a time of 45.73 seconds in the first round and 45.55 in the semi-final, placing eighth overall. At the Games, he also ran in the mixed 4 x 400 metres relay with the Nigeria team ultimately winning the bronze medal.
