= Cravon Gillespie =

American sprinter

Cravon Gillespie OLY
Personal information
- Nationality: American
- Born: July 31, 1996 (age 30) Pasadena, California, U.S.
- Height: 6 ft 0 in (183 cm)

Sport
- Country: United States
- Sport: Track and field
- Event: Sprinting
- College team: Oregon Ducks
- Turned pro: 2019
- Coached by: John Smith (2019-2021); Stuart McMillan (2024-Present); Robert Johnson (2017 - 2019)

Achievements and titles
- Personal bests: 100 m: 9.93 (2019); 200 m: 19.93 (2019)
Medal record
Men's track and field
Representing the United States
World Championships
Gold medal – first place	2019 Doha	4 × 100 m relay
Pan American Games
Bronze medal – third place	2019 Lima	4 × 100 m relay

Cravon Tommy Gillespie (born July 31, 1996) is an American professional track and field sprinter who specializes in the 100 metres and 200 metres races. He represented the United States at the 2019 World Athletics Championships, earning a gold medal in the 4 × 100 metres relay.

== College career ==
Following stints at Monrovia High School and Mount San Antonio College, Gillespie became an All-American multiple times for the Oregon Ducks and Mt. SAC Mounties.

=== 2018 ===
In 2018, Gillespie won the PAC-12 100 m title and finished second in the 200 m. He qualified for the 100 m final at the Outdoor NCAA Championships, where he finished fourth in 10.27 seconds.

=== 2019 ===
After finishing 4th in the 60 m at NCAA Indoors, Gillespie's breakthrough came outdoors; he defended his PAC-12 100 m title in 9.97 seconds, breaking 10 seconds for the first time. He also won the 200 m in 20.17 seconds. At NCAAs, he was second in both 100 m and 200 m, setting Oregon school records of 9.93 and 19.93 seconds, respectively.

== International career ==
=== 2019 ===
On June 14, 2019, just seven days after his breakthrough NCAA performances, Gillespie turned professional and signed with Nike. He focused on the 100 metres for the rest of the season, finishing fourth at the US Championships and qualifying for the US' World Championship 4 × 100 metres relay team. He was also selected to represent USA at the 2019 Pan American Games, where he finished sixth in the 100 metres and won bronze in the 4 × 100 metres relay.

Gillespie was scheduled to compete in the 100 meters at the 2019 World Athletics Championships. He ultimately did not race individually, but did race as part of the 4 × 100 metres relay heats; he did not race in the relay final, but due to racing in the heats was awarded a gold medal.

He entered the Championships with a tie for the fifth fastest time in the world.

=== 2020 ===
On August 6, 2020, Gillespie won his first race as a professional at the PVAMU Back To The Track Series 3 in Prairie View, Texas.

=== 2021 ===
After a rocky start to his season, Gillespie returned to Mt. San Antonio for the USATF Golden Games, where he would compete against Seattle Seahawks wide receiver DK Metcalf in the 100 metres. He won his heat with ease in 10.11 seconds, then won the final in a season's best of 9.96 seconds; his first sub-10 since NCAAS two years prior. He then set his sights on the Olympic Trials, where he finished sixth in 10.00 seconds. He also competed in the 2020 Summer Olympics in Tokyo, Japan where he ran the anchor leg of the 4 × 100 m relay team also featuring Trayvon Bromell, Fred Kerley, and Ronnie Baker.

== Coaching career ==
Gillespie signed with Athletes Untapped as a private track and field coach on June 7, 2024.
