= Montserrat at the Commonwealth Games =

- CGF code: MSR (MNT used at these Games)
- CGA: Montserrat Amateur Athletic Association
- Medals Ranked 0th: Gold 0 Silver 0 Bronze 0 Total 0

Commonwealth Games appearances (overview)
- 1994; 1998; 2002; 2006; 2010; 2014; 2018; 2022; 2026; 2030

Montserrat have competed at each of the last nine Commonwealth Games, making their first appearance in 1994. They have not won a medal.

== 2002 ==
Montserrat competed in their third Commonwealth Games in 2002. Only one athlete, Gavin Lee, took part; he competed in the Men's High Jump and jumped 1.95 meters, finishing 16th.
