= Vanessa Clerveaux =

Haitian hurdler (born 1994)

Personal information
- Born: 17 June 1994 (age 32) Brockton, Massachusetts
- Education: Eastern Michigan University; University of Alabama

Sport
- Sport: Athletics
- Event: 100 metres hurdles
- College team: Eastern Michigan Eagles; Alabama Crimson Tide

Vanessa Clerveaux (born 17 June 1994) is an American-born Haitian athlete specialising in the high hurdles. She won a silver medal at the 2018 Central American and Caribbean Games. Clerveaux also placed seventh and sixth at the 2018 NACAC Championships and the 2019 Pan American Games. She had been selected to represent Haiti at the 2020 Summer Olympics, however she had to drop out due to an injury.

== Early life and education ==
Vanessa Clerveaux was born on 17 June 1994 in Brockton, Massachusetts to Lauve Lorcy and Frantz Clerveaux, both of whom were born in Haiti. She has one brother. She attended the Davis School and Brockton High School. While attending the latter, she became interested in competing in the hurdles, eventually winning the Massachusetts 55 meter hurdles and 4x200 meter relay indoor state championships in 2011. She also won the outdoor state championship in the 55-meter hurdles and the 4x100-meter relay the same year. Clerveaux graduated from the school in 2012, before majoring in dentistry at Eastern Michigan University, while competing with the Eastern Michigan Eagles track and field team. After her freshman year, she transferred to the University of Alabama, where she specialised in the hurdles and sprinting. She graduated from the university in 2017.

== Career ==
After finishing her education, Clerveaux was accepted into the Haitian Olympic team and began training with them in Florida. Two weeks after graduating, she participated in her first professional competition.

During the 2018 Central American and Caribbean Games, Clerveaux won a silver medal for Haiti in the 100 meter hurdles with a time of 13.07 seconds. The same year, she competed at the NACAC Championships and placed seventh with a time of 13.17 seconds in the same event. In the subsequent year, she placed sixth at the Pan American Games in Peru and 27th at the 2019 World Athletics Championships in Doha.

Clerveaux was selected for the postponed 2020 Summer Olympics but withdrew in July 2021 due to a sprained ankle she sustained during a race in April.

She competed in the 60 meter hurdles at the 2022 World Athletics Indoor Championships in Belgrade, where she reached the semi-finals. Clerveaux again raced the 60 meter hurdles at the 2024 World Athletics Indoor Championships in Glasgow, where she had a time of 8.29 seconds.

== International competitions ==
Year	Competition	Venue	Position	Event	Notes
Representing Haiti
2018	Central American and Caribbean Games	Barranquilla, Colombia	2nd	100 m hurdles	13.07
2018	NACAC Championships	Toronto, Canada	7th	100 m hurdles	13.21
2019	Pan American Games	Lima, Peru	6th	100 m hurdles	13.17
2019	World Championships	Doha, Qatar	27th (h)	100 m hurdles	13.15
2022	World Indoor Championships	Belgrade, Serbia	20th (sf)	60 m hurdles	8.15
2024	World Indoor Championships	Glasgow, United Kingdom	35th (h)	60 m hurdles	8.29
