= Chanel Brissett =

American track and field athlete

Personal information
- Born: August 10, 1999 (age 26)
- Education: University of Southern California University of Texas - Austin

Sport
- Country: United States
- Sport: Track and field
- Event: 100 metres hurdles
Medal record
Women's athletics
Representing United States
Pan American Games
Silver medal – second place	2019 Lima	100 m hurdles
Bronze medal – third place	2019 Lima	4×100 m relay

Chanel Brissett (born August 10, 1999) is an American track and field athlete who specializes in the 100 metres hurdles. She won the silver medal in the women's 100 metres hurdles event at the 2019 Pan American Games held in Lima, Peru. She also won the bronze medal in the women's 4×100 metres relay event.

Running for the USC Trojans track and field team, Brissett won the 2019 60 meter hurdles at the NCAA Division I Indoor Track and Field Championships with a time of 7.90 seconds.
