= Michelle Harrison (athlete) =

Canadian athlete

Personal information
- Nationality: Canadian
- Born: December 6, 1992 (age 33) Saskatoon, Saskatchewan

Sport
- Sport: Athletics
- Event: 100m hurdles

Achievements and titles
- Personal bests: 60m hurdles: 8.09 (Belgrade, 2022); 100m: 11.36 (Sollentuna, 2023); 100m hurdles: 12.74 (Eugene, 2022)

Michelle Harrison (born December 6, 1992) is a Canadian track and field athlete. She is a multiple-time national champion in the 100 metres hurdles.

== Early life ==
From Saskatoon, Harrison attended Lakeridge Elementary School, Evan Hardy Collegiate for high school, and the University of Saskatchewan.

== Career ==
Harrison won three Canadian university championship titles in the 60m metres hurdles, whilst competing for the Saskatchewan Huskies. Setting a Canada West Championship record (8.21s) and USports Championship record (8.15s) in her final year with the Huskies.

In March 2022, Harrison set a new personal best time of 8.09 seconds in the 60 metres hurdles at the 2022 World Athletics Indoor Championships in Belgrade, Serbia.

Harrison followed up back-to-back Canadian national titles in the 100 metres hurdles with a new personal best time of 12.74 seconds in the semi-final of the 2022 World Athletics Championships in Eugene, Oregon in August 2023. Selected for the 2022 Commonwealth Games in Birmingham, she qualified for the final and finished in eighth place.

In July 2023, she won her third national 100m hurdles title, running 12.82 seconds to beat Mariam Abdul-Rashid by 0.01 seconds. In August 2023, she competed at the 2023 World Athletics Championships in Budapest and qualified for the semi-finals.

She competed in the 100m hurdles at the 2024 Paris Olympics.

== International competitions ==
Harrison has represented Canada on 8 occasions - 2009 World Youth Championships (400m Hurdles); 2014 NACAC U23 Championships (100m Hurdles); 2015 World University Games (100m Hurdles); 2022 World Indoor Championships (60m Hurdles); 2022 World Championships (100m Hurdles); 2022 Commonwealth Games (100m Hurdles); 2022 NACAC Championships (100m Hurdles); 2023 World Championships (100m Hurdles).
