= List of Montserrat records in athletics =

The following are the national records in athletics in Montserrat maintained by Montserrat's national athletics federation: Montserrat Amateur Athletic Association (MAAA).

== Outdoor ==
Key to tables: Awaiting ratification Record not kept by MAAA Not ratified or later rescinded by MAAA

=== Men ===
Event	Record	Athlete	Date	Meet	Place	Ref.
100 m	10.12 (+1.8 m/s)	Julius Morris	12 May 2018	Conference USA Championships	Houston, United States	
200 m	20.28 A (+0.7 m/s)	Julius Morris	14 May 2017	Conference USA Championships	El Paso, United States	
400 m	48.55	Stephen Lewis	1 May 1992		Spokane, United States	
800 m	1:54.92	Henry Sweeney	6 May 1995		Long Beach, United States	
800 m	1:53.76 (Note: erroneous report)	Henry Sweeney	6 May 1995		Long Beach, United States	
1500 m	4:21.1 h	Cardinal Maynard	9 July 1977		Road Town, British Virgin Islands	
3000 m						
5000 m	17:16.34	Herman Lewis	4 May 1991		Castries, Saint Lucia	
10,000 m						
10 km (road)	41:28	Anthony Glaser (Note: citizenship unclear)	4 July 2018	AJC Peachtree Road Race 10k	Atlanta, United States	
Half marathon	1:38:36+	Anthony Glaser (Note: citizenship unclear)	17 February 2019	A1A Fort Lauderdale Marathon	Fort Lauderdale, United States	
30 km	2:19:35+	Anthony Glaser (Note: citizenship unclear)	17 February 2019	A1A Fort Lauderdale Marathon	Fort Lauderdale, United States	
Marathon	3:15:45	Anthony Glaser (Note: citizenship unclear)	17 February 2019	A1A Fort Lauderdale Marathon	Fort Lauderdale, United States	
110 m hurdles	16.14 NWI	Gavin Lee	30 May 2000	Bergen County Meet of Champs	Hackensack, United States	
400 m hurdles	1:05.44	Gavin Gerald	25 March 2006	Richard Stockton Invitational	Pomona, United States	
3000 m steeplechase						
High jump	2.03 m	Gavin Lee	17 April 2002			
Pole vault	3.58 m	Lloyd Maloney	14 September 1959		Uxbridge, United Kingdom	
Long jump	7.51 m (+0.7 m/s)	Darren Morsen	10 April 2018	Commonwealth Games	Gold Coast, Australia	
Triple jump	14.69 m NWI	Oswald Phillip (Note: by World Athletics statistic handbook; Phillip Oswald by World Athletics profile)	24 July 1982		Plymouth, Montserrat	
Shot put	13.51 m	Bruce Farara	2 June 1974		Basseterre, Saint Kitts and Nevis	
Discus throw	34.24 m	Eugene Skerritt	24 July 1982		Plymouth, Montserrat	
Hammer throw						
Javelin throw	51.81 m (Note: record set during decathlon competition)	Oswald Phillip (Note: by World Athletics statistic handbook; Phillip Oswald by World Athletics profile)	20 April 1990		San Juan, Puerto Rico	
Decathlon	6216 pts h	Oswald Phillip (Note: by World Athletics statistic handbook; Phillip Oswald by World Athletics profile)	20–21 April 1990		San Juan, Puerto Rico	
Decathlon	100m / Long jump / Shot put / High jump / 400m / 110m H / Discus / Pole vault / Javelin / 1500m; 11.5 h (NWI) / 6.86 m (NWI) / 10.47 m / 1.77 m / 50.8 h / 17.3 h (NWI) / 30.84 m / 3.37 m / 51.81 m / 4:32.28					
20 km walk (road)						
50 km walk (road)						
4 × 100 m relay	42.34	Montserrat; Julius Morris; L. Ryan; A. Skerritt; A. Dyett	22 February 2014		Vieux Fort, Saint Lucia	
4 × 100 m relay	41.47	Montserrat; Johmari Lee; Julius Morris; Sanjay Weekes; Tevique Benjamin	6 August 2022	Commonwealth Games	Birmingham, United Kingdom	
4 × 400 m relay	3:52.2 h	Montserrat	24 July 1982		Plymouth, Montserrat	

=== Women ===
Event	Record	Athlete	Date	Meet	Place	Ref.
100 m	13.17 NWI	Tenecia Pollard	28 May 2005		St. John's, Montserrat	
200 m	26.69 NWI	Jenalyn Weekes	28 February 2016		Vieux-Fort, Saint Lucia	
400 m	1:01.80	Jenalyn Weekes	28 February 2016		Vieux-Fort, Saint Lucia	
400 m	57.7 h	Lyn Ryan	17 May 1970		Leamington Spa, United Kingdom	
800 m	2:31.5 h	Estelle Furlonge	5 July 1992		Road Town, British Virgin Islands	
1500 m	5:48.3 h	Magdalena O'Brien	9 July 1977		Road Town, British Virgin Islands	
3000 m	11:31.8 h	Judith Allen	8 May 1988		St. John's, Montserrat	
5000 m						
10,000 m						
Marathon						
100 m hurdles	18.6 h NWI	Lynette Lee	25 April 1970		Enfield, United Kingdom	
400 m hurdles						
3000 m steeplechase						
High jump	1.57 m	Lynette Lee	23 May 1971		London, United Kingdom	
Pole vault						
Long jump	5.62 m NWI	Lynette Lee	23 May 1971		London, United Kingdom	
Triple jump						
Shot put	11.52 m	Jenita Shields	24 July 1982		Plymouth, Montserrat	
Discus throw	26.95 m	Ericca Fredericks	March 1999		Road Town, British Virgin Islands	
Hammer throw						
Javelin throw						
Heptathlon						
Heptathlon	100m H / High jump / Shot put / 200m / Long jump / Javelin / 800m					
20 km walk (road)						
4 × 100 m relay	51.9 h	Montserrat	24 May 1987		St. George's, Grenada	
4 × 400 m relay						

== Indoor ==
=== Men ===
Event	Record	Athlete	Date	Meet	Place	Ref.
60 m	6.70	Julius Morris	20 January 2018	Vanderbilt Invitational	Nashville, United States	
200 m	20.89	Julius Morris	25 February 2018	Boston University Last Chance Qualifier	Boston, United States	
400 m	50.32	Julius Morris	6 January 2017	Gene Edmonds Open	West Lafayette, United States	
400 m	48.00 OT	Julius Morris	5 December 2017	Vanderbilt Opener	Nashville, United States	
400 m	49.31 OT	Julius Morris	5 December 2015	Vanderbilt Opener	Nashville, United States	
600 m	1:28.44	Julius Morris	13 January 2018	Gene Edmonds Invitational	West Lafayette, United States	
800 m						
1500 m						
3000 m						
60 m hurdles						
High jump						
Pole vault						
Long jump	7.34 m	Lavon Allen	22 February 2020		Columbia, United States	
Triple jump						
Shot put						
Heptathlon						
Heptathlon	60m / Long jump / Shot put / High jump / 60m H / Pole vault / 1000m					
5000 m walk						
4 × 400 m relay						

=== Women ===
Event	Record	Athlete	Date	Meet	Place	Ref.
60 m						
200 m						
400 m						
800 m						
1500 m						
3000 m						
60 m hurdles						
High jump						
Pole vault						
Long jump						
Triple jump						
Shot put						
Pentathlon						
Pentathlon	60m H / High jump / Shot put / Long jump / 800m					
3000 m walk						
4 × 400 m relay						
