= Gabbi Cunningham =

American hurdler (born 1998)

Personal information
- Born: Gabriele Cunningham; February 22, 1998 (age 28) Charlotte, North Carolina, U.S.

Sport
- Sport: Track and Field
- Event: 100 metres hurdles
- College team: North Carolina State University
Medal record
Women's Athletics
Representing United States
World Indoor Championships
| Bronze medal – third place | 2022 Belgrade | 60 m hurdles |

Gabriele “Gabbi” Cunningham (born February 22, 1998) is an American Olympic track athlete. She won the bronze medal in the 60 metres hurdles at the 2022 World Indoor Championships in Belgrade.

Cunningham is from Charlotte, North Carolina and attended Mallard Creek High School. She is an alumna of North Carolina State University. Cunningham was a 2018 NCAA All-American for the Indoor 60m hurdles, and a 2019 NCAA All-American for the Indoor 60m and the 60m hurdles. She was a two time Pan Am Junior Championships Medalist in 2017, with gold in the 4 × 100 m relay and bronze in the 200m.

In Albuquerque on February 15, 2020, Cunningham ran 7.92 for the indoor 60m hurdles which placed her in the top 10 for the year in that discipline worldwide.

Cunningham finished fourth in the 100m hurdles at the 2020 United States Olympic Trials (track and field) in a personal best time of 12:53, and replaced Brianna McNeal in the US Olympic squad for the 2020 Summer Games. Cunningham ran 13.01s to place seventh in the event's final on 2 August.

In 2022, she earned the bronze medal for the 60m hurdles at the World Indoor Championships held in Belgrade with a time of 7.87 seconds. Cyréna Samba-Mayela won gold and Devynne Charlton captured silver.

== International competitions ==
Representing the United States
| Year | Competition | Venue | Position | Event | Time |
|---|---|---|---|---|---|
| 2017 | Pan American U20 Championships | Trujillo, Peru | 3rd | 200 m | 23.60 |
| 2017 | Pan American U20 Championships | Trujillo, Peru | 1st | 4 × 100 m relay | 44.07 |
| 2021 | Olympic Games | Tokyo, Japan | 7th | 100 m hurdles | 13.01 |
| 2022 | World Indoor Championships | Belgrade, Serbia | 3rd | 60 m hurdles | 7.87 |

== Personal bests ==
- 60 metres indoor – 7.23 (Lubbock, TX 2019)
- 60 metres hurdles indoor – 7.82 (Spokane, WA 2022)

- 100 metres – 11.21 (+1.8 m/s, Des Moines, IA 2018)
- 100 metres hurdles – 12.53 (+0.8 m/s, Eugene, OR 2021)
- 200 metres – 23.04 (+0.4 m/s, Coral Gables, FL 2018)
