= Alaba Akintola =

Nigerian athlete (born 2001)

Alaba Olukunle
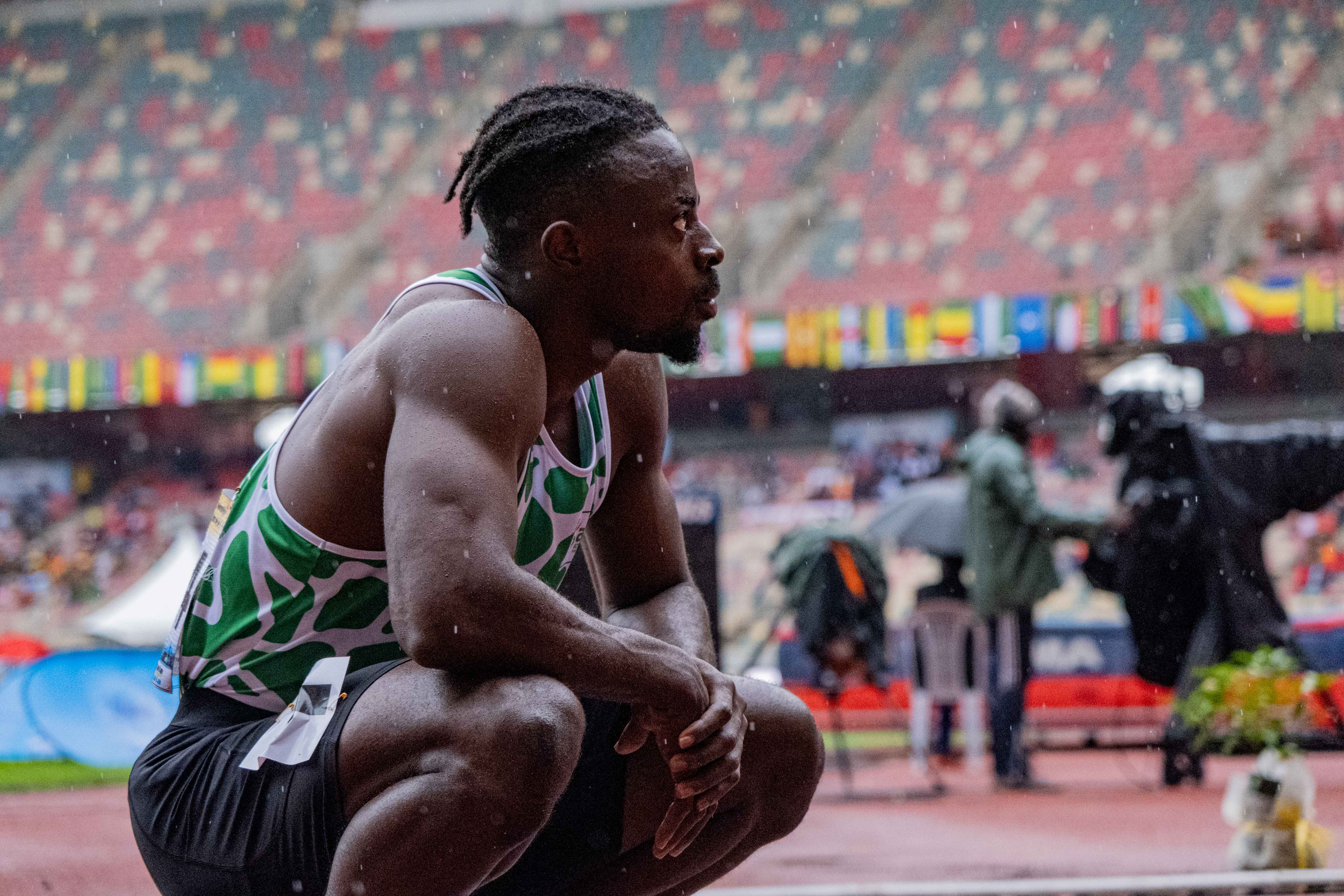

Personal information
- Full name: Alaba Akintola Olukunle
- Nationality: Nigerian
- Born: 14 September 2001 (age 24)
- Education: Middle Tennessee State University

Sport
- Sport: Track and Field
- Events: 100m & 200m

Achievements and titles
- Personal best: 100m - 10.04s 200m - 20.23s
Medal record
Men's athletics
Representing Nigeria
Commonwealth Games
| Bronze medal – third place | 2022 Birmingham | 4×100 m relay |
African Games
| Gold medal – first place | 2023 Accra | 4×100 m relay |
African Championships
| Silver medal – second place | 2024 Douala | 4×100 m relay |

Alaba Akintola Olukunle (born 14 September 2001) is a Nigerian track and field athlete who competes in the short sprints.

He competed for Nigeria at local and international track and field competitions. Olukunle participated in the men's 4 x 100 metres relay competition at the 2022 Commonwealth Games representing Nigeria.

== Achievements ==
Olukunle represented Nigeria at the 2018 Youth Olympic Games in Buenos Aires, Argentina where he won the silver medal in the 100 metres event behind Luke Davids of South Africa.

He was part of the team alongside Udodi Onwuzurike, Raymond Ekevwo and Favour Ashe that won bronze medal in the 4 × 100 m relay at the 2022 Commonwealth Games in Birmingham, England.
