= Kyle Greaux =

Trinidadian athlete (born 1988)

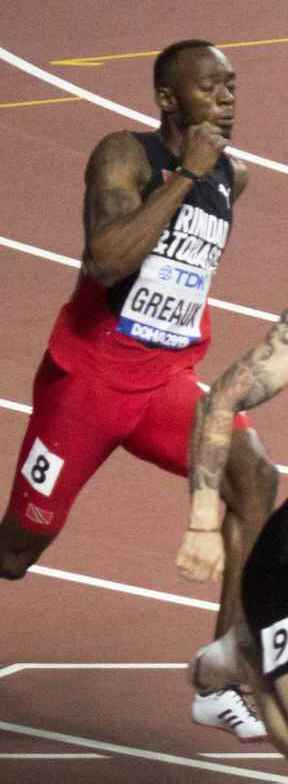

Personal information
- Born: 26 April 1988 (age 38) Sangre Grande, Trinidad
- Height: 1.88 m (6 ft 2 in)
- Weight: 96 kg (212 lb)

Sport
- Sport: Track and field
- Events: 100 metres, 200 metres
Medal record
Men's Athletics
Representing Trinidad and Tobago
Commonwealth Games
Silver medal – second place	2022 Birmingham	4×100 m relay
Pan American Games
Silver medal – second place	2019 Lima	4×100 m relay

Kyle Vernie Peter Greaux (born 26 April 1988) is a Trinidad and Tobago sprinter competing primarily in the 200 metres. He competed at the 2013 and 2015 World Championships without advancing from the first round. He also competed at the Track and Field Racers Series 5 at the Hasely Crawford Stadium in Port-of-Spain on 20 January 2018 where he ran the fastest 100m heat of 10.41 seconds with wind being 2.1 m/s. On 17 February 2018, the month after, he competed in the NAAA Pre-Commonwealth Meet at the same venue in the 200 metres where he ran the fastest 200 metres with a time of 20.40 seconds with wind being 3.9 m/s. He was the only one in the Men's 200 metres to qualify for the Commonwealth Games which was held at the Gold Coast in Australia by surpassing the world standard of 20.50 seconds.

== Competition record ==
Year	Competition	Venue	Position	Event	Notes
Representing Trinidad and Tobago
2013	Central American and Caribbean Championships	Morelia, Mexico	5th	200 m	20.58
2013	World Championships	Moscow, Russia	32nd (h)	200 m	20.89
2014	Commonwealth Games	Glasgow, United Kingdom	21st (sf)	200 m	20.93
2014	Central American and Caribbean Games	Xalapa, Mexico	5th	200 m	20.95
2015	Pan American Games	Toronto, Canada	14th (h)	200 m	20.69
2015	NACAC Championships	San José, Costa Rica	5th	200 m	20.64
2015	NACAC Championships	San José, Costa Rica	5th	4 × 100 m relay	38.90
2015	World Championships	Beijing, China	31st (h)	200 m	20.51
2016	Olympic Games	Rio de Janeiro, Brazil	45th (h)	200 m	20.61
2017	IAAF World Relays	Nassau, Bahamas	1st (B)	4 × 100 m relay	39.04
2017	IAAF World Relays	Nassau, Bahamas	4th	4 × 200 m relay	1:21.39
2017	World Championships	London, United Kingdom	19th (sf)	200 m	20.65
2017	World Championships	London, United Kingdom	9th (h)	4 × 100 m relay	38.61
2018	Commonwealth Games	Gold Coast, Australia	6th	200 m	20.63
2018	Central American and Caribbean Games	Barranquilla, Colombia	3rd	200 m	20.26
2018	NACAC Championships	Toronto, Canada	1st	200 m	20.11
2018	NACAC Championships	Toronto, Canada	3rd	4 × 100 m relay	38.89
2019	Pan American Games	Lima, Peru	16th (h)	200 m	22.71
2019	Pan American Games	Lima, Peru	2nd	4 × 100 m relay	38.46
2019	World Championships	Doha, Qatar	8th	200 m	20.39
2021	Olympic Games	Tokyo, Japan	30th (h)	200 m	20.77
2022	NACAC Championships	Freeport, Bahamas	4th (h)	200 m	20.68^{1}
2022	NACAC Championships	Freeport, Bahamas	2nd	4 × 100 m relay	38.93
2023	Pan American Games	Santiago, Chile	6th	200 m	21.32
2023	Pan American Games	Santiago, Chile	4th	4 × 100 m relay	39.54

^{1}Did not finish in the final

== Personal bests ==
Outdoor

- 100 metres – 10.16 (+1.8 m/s, Port-of-Spain 2017)
- 200 metres – 19.97 (CAC Games, Colombia 2018)
- 400 metres – 47.14 (Port-of-Spain 2013)

Indoor

- 60 metres – 6.87 (New York 2015)
- 200 metres – 21.25 (New York 2015)
