= Leya Buchanan =

Canadian sprinter (born 1996)

Personal information
- Born: 17 August 1996 (age 29) Mississauga, Ontario, Canada

Sport
- Sport: Sprinting
- Event(s): 100 metres, 200 metres
Medal record
Representing Canada
Pan American Games
Silver medal – second place	2019 Lima	4×100 m relay

Leya Buchanan (born 17 August 1996) is a Canadian sprinter from Mississauga, Ontario. She competed in the women's 100 metres at the 2017 World Championships in Athletics.
