= Ifeanyichukwu Otuonye =

Turks and Caicos Islands long jumper

Personal information
- Born: 27 June 1994 (age 32) Benin City, Nigeria

Sport
- Country: Turks and Caicos Islands
- Sport: Track and field
- Event: Long jump

Ifeanyichukwu Otuonye (born 27 June 1994) is a Nigerian-born Turks and Caicos Islander long jumper. He competed at the 2015 World Championships in Beijing without recording a valid jump.

Otuonye graduated from HJ Robinson High School in Cockburn Town, the only high school in the Turks and Caicos Islander capital. Otuonye formerly was a student athlete of Kansas State University, where he set the national long jump record at 7.58 metres. A competitor in international competitions since 2010, Otuonye retired in 2023 with his final long jump placing him fifth at the Central American and Caribbean Games.

== Competition record ==
Year	Competition	Venue	Position	Event	Notes
Representing Turks and Caicos Islands
2010	CARIFTA Games (U17)	George Town, Cayman Islands	2nd	High jump	1.98 m
2010	CARIFTA Games (U17)	George Town, Cayman Islands	8th	Long jump	6.36 m
2011	CARIFTA Games (U20)	Montego Bay, Jamaica	5th	4 × 100 m relay	41.71 s
2011	CARIFTA Games (U20)	Montego Bay, Jamaica	10th	High jump	1.75 m
2011	CARIFTA Games (U20)	Montego Bay, Jamaica	6th	Long jump	6.86 m
2011	Commonwealth Youth Games	Douglas, Isle of Man	13th (sf)	200 m	23.02 s (w)
2011	Commonwealth Youth Games	Douglas, Isle of Man	3rd	Long jump	7.15 m
2012	CARIFTA Games (U20)	Hamilton, Bermuda	3rd	4 × 100 m relay	41.48 s
2012	CARIFTA Games (U20)	Hamilton, Bermuda	5th	Long jump	6.98 m
2012	CAC Junior Championships (U20)	San Salvador, El Salvador	–	High jump	NM
2012	CAC Junior Championships (U20)	San Salvador, El Salvador	2nd	Long jump	7.18 m
2013	CARIFTA Games (U20)	Nassau, Bahamas	3rd	4 × 100 m relay	44.11 s
2013	CARIFTA Games (U20)	Nassau, Bahamas	4th	Long jump	7.34 m
2014	Commonwealth Games	Glasgow, United Kingdom	11th (h)	4 × 400 m relay	3:19.11 s
2014	Commonwealth Games	Glasgow, United Kingdom	16th (q)	Long jump	7.47 m
2014	NACAC U23 Championships	Kamloops, Canada	9th	Long jump	3.84 m
2015	IAAF World Relays	Nassau, Bahamas	–	4 × 200 m relay	DQ
2015	NACAC Championships	San José, Costa Rica	3rd	Long jump	7.71 m
2015	World Championships	Beijing, China	–	Long jump	NM
2016	World Indoor Championships	Portland, United States	11th	Long jump	7.40 m
2016	NACAC U23 Championships	San Salvador, El Salvador	1st	Long jump	7.88 m
2017	World Championships	London, United Kingdom	44th (h)	200 m	21.91
2018	Commonwealth Games	Gold Coast, Australia	6th	4 × 400 m relay	3:16.39 s
2018	Commonwealth Games	Gold Coast, Australia	9th	Long jump	7.80 m
2018	Central American and Caribbean Games	Barranquilla, Colombia	–	4 × 400 m relay	DNF
2018	Central American and Caribbean Games	Barranquilla, Colombia	6th	Long jump	7.66 m
2018	NACAC Championships	Toronto, Canada	5th	4 × 100 m relay	41.21
2018	NACAC Championships	Toronto, Canada	6th	Long jump	7.78 m
2022	NACAC Championships	Freeport, Bahamas	7th	Long jump	7.47 m
2023	Central American and Caribbean Games	San Salvador, El Salvador	5th	Long jump	7.21 m
