= Julius Morris =

Montserratian sprinter

Personal information
- Born: 14 April 1994 (age 31) Plymouth, Montserrat
- Education: Western Kentucky University

Sport
- Country: Montserrat
- Sport: Track and field
- Event(s): 100 metres, 200 metres

Julius Morris (born 14 April 1994) is a Montserratian sprinter. He competed in the 200 metres at the 2015 World Championships in Beijing. He holds national records on several distances.

Morris was an All-American sprinter for the Western Kentucky Hilltoppers track and field team, anchoring their 5th-place 4 × 100 meters relay team at the 2016 NCAA Division I Outdoor Track and Field Championships.

== Competition record ==
Year	Competition	Venue	Position	Event	Notes
Representing Montserrat
2012	CARIFTA Games (U20)	Hamilton, Bermuda	18th (h)	100 m	11.00 (w)
2012	CARIFTA Games (U20)	Hamilton, Bermuda	25th (h)	200 m	23.01
2013	Leeward Islands Junior Championships	Road Town, British Virgin Islands	2nd	200 m	21.51
2013	Central American and Caribbean Championships	Morelia, Mexico	18th (h)	100 m	10.54
2013	Central American and Caribbean Championships	Morelia, Mexico	21st (h)	200 m	21.66
2014	Commonwealth Games	Glasgow, United Kingdom	32nd (h)	100 m	10.55
2014	Commonwealth Games	Glasgow, United Kingdom	43rd (h)	200 m	21.44
2014	Commonwealth Games	Glasgow, United Kingdom	–	4 × 100 m relay	DQ
2014	NACAC U23 Championships	Kamloops, Canada	4th	100 m	10.41
2014	NACAC U23 Championships	Kamloops, Canada	4th	200 m	20.52
2015	NACAC Championships	San José, Costa Rica	7th (sf)	100 m	10.06 (w)
2015	NACAC Championships	San José, Costa Rica	4th	200 m	20.48
2015	World Championships	Beijing, China	35th (h)	200 m	20.56
2016	World Indoor Championships	Portland, United States	42nd (h)	60 m	6.85
2018	Commonwealth Games	Gold Coast, Australia	10th (sf)	200 m	20.69
2018	NACAC Championships	Toronto, Canada	13th (h)	100 m	10.50
2018	NACAC Championships	Toronto, Canada	10th (h)	200 m	21.11

== Personal bests ==
Outdoor

- 100 metres – 10.12 (+1.8 m/s, Houston, TX 2018) NR
- 200 metres – 20.28 (+ m/s, El Paso 2017) NR

Indoor

- 60 metres – 6.74 (Nashville 2016) NR
- 200 metres – 20.99 (Birmingham, AL 2016) NR
- 400 metres – 49.31 (Nashville, AL 2015) NR
