= Tennis at the 2019 Pan American Games – Qualification =

Qualification
- Tennis at the 2019 Pan American Games

Events
Singles	men	women
Doubles	men	women	mixed
Qualification
- Pan American Games

== Qualification system ==
A total of 80 tennis players will qualify to compete at the Games (48 men and 32 women). Each country is allowed to enter a maximum of three male and three female athletes (with one pair maximum in each of the doubles events). The singles events will consist of 48 men and 32 women respectively, with those athletes competing in the doubles events. The host nation Peru was allowed to enter with a maximum team of 6 athletes, while the remaining spots were distributed using the ATP rankings, WTA rankings and ITF rankings. A further four wildcards for men and one for women was also awarded.

== Qualification summary ==
Nation	Men		Women		Mixed	Total
Nation	Singles	Doubles	Singles	Doubles	Doubles	Athletes
Antigua and Barbuda	1					1
Argentina	3	X	3	X	X	6
Bahamas	2	X				2
Barbados	3	X				3
Bolivia	2	X	1		X	3
Brazil	2	X	2	X	X	4
Canada			3	X		3
Chile	3	X	2	X	X	6
Colombia	3	X	3	X	X	6
Cuba	2	X				2
Dominican Republic	3	X	1		X	4
Ecuador	2	X	2	X		4
El Salvador	3	X				3
Grenada			1			1
Guatemala	2	X	2	X	X	4
Honduras	2	X				2
Jamaica	1					1
Mexico	3	X	3	X	X	6
Paraguay			2	X		2
Peru	3	X	3	X	X	6
United States	3	X	3	X	X	6
Uruguay	2	X				2
Total: 22 NOCs	45	17	31	11	10	77

=== Men's singles ===
Event	Vacancies	Qualifiers
Hosts	3	Juan Pablo Varillas (PER); Nicolás Álvarez (PER); Sergio Galdós (PER)
2018 South American Games	2	Tomás Barrios (CHI); Francisco Cerúndolo (ARG)
2018 Central American and Caribbean Games	2	Víctor Estrella (DOM); Roberto Cid (DOM)
ATP or ITF ranking	38	Nicolás Jarry (CHI); Guido Andreozzi (ARG); Facundo Bagnis (ARG); Darian King (BAR); Roberto Quiroz (ECU); Santiago Giraldo (COL); João Menezes (BRA); José Hernández (DOM); Gonzalo Escobar (ECU); Michael Redlicki (USA); Alejandro Tabilo (CHI); Kevin King (USA); Thiago Wild (BRA); Alejandro González (COL); Manuel Sánchez (MEX); Sam Riffice (USA); Federico Zeballos (BOL); Nicolás Mejía (COL); Wilfredo González (GUA); Alex Hernández (MEX); Justin Roberts (BAH); Baker Newman (BAH); Jody Maginley (ATG); Alan Rubio (MEX); Boris Arias (BOL); Franco Roncadelli (URU); Haydn Lewis (BAR); Seanon Williams (BAR); Stefan González (GUA); Alejandro Obando (HON); Keny Turcios (HON); Francisco Llanes (URU); Yoan Pérez (CUB); Rowland Phillips (JAM); Kyle Johnson (ESA); Alberto Alvarado (ESA); Osmel Rivera (CUB); Lluis Miralles (ESA)
Total	45	

=== Men's doubles ===
Event	Vacancies	Qualifiers
Host	1	Peru
World ranking	16	Ecuador; Argentina; Bolivia; Colombia; Dominican Republic; Brazil; Chile; El Salvador; Guatemala; Mexico; Barbados; United States; Uruguay; Bahamas; Honduras; Cuba
Total	17	

=== Women's singles ===
Event	Vacancies	Qualifiers
Hosts	3	Dominique Schaefer (PER); Dana Guzmán (PER); Anastasia Iamachkine (PER)
2018 South American Games	2	Montserrat González (PAR); Daniela Seguel (CHI)
WTA or ITF ranking	26	Rebecca Marino (CAN); Verónica Cepede Royg (PAR); Nadia Podoroska (ARG); Caroline Dolehide (USA); Renata Zarazúa (MEX); Usue Arconada (USA); Carolina Alves (BRA); Victoria Bosio (ARG); Camila Osorio (COL); Giuliana Olmos (MEX); Luisa Stefani (BRA); María Fernanda Herazo (COL); Catalina Pella (ARG); Fernanda Brito (CHI); Marcela Zacarías (MEX); Alexa Graham (USA); Emiliana Arango (COL); Charlotte Römer (ECU); Jada Bui (CAN); Alexandra Vagramov (CAN); Andrea Weedon (GUA); Melissa Morales (GUA); Noelia Zeballos (BOL); Akilah James (GRN); Mell Reasco (ECU); Kelly Williford (DOM)
Total	31	

=== Women's doubles ===
Event	Vacancies	Qualifiers
Host	1	Peru
World ranking	10	United States; Mexico; Brazil; Chile; Colombia; Canada; Paraguay; Guatemala; Ecuador; Argentina
Total	11	

=== Mixed doubles ===
Event	Vacancies	Qualifiers
Host	1	Peru
World ranking	9	Chile; Brazil; Bolivia; Argentina; Guatemala; United States; Mexico; Colombia; Dominican Republic
Total	10	
