= Badminton at the 2019 Pan American Games – Qualification =

The following is the qualification system and qualified athletes for the Badminton at the 2019 Pan American Games competitions.

== Qualification system ==
A total of 88 athletes (44 men and 44 women) will qualify to compete at the games. A nation may enter a maximum of four athletes per gender. As host nation, Peru automatically qualifies a full team of eights athletes. All other quotas were awarded through the team world rankings as of February 28, 2019. Each nation's highest ranked athlete/pair's points in each of the five events were added to determine a country's point total. The top three ranked will qualify eight athletes, the next four countries will qualify six each (three per gender) and the next four after that will qualify four each (two per gender). All other nations will qualify two athletes each (one per gender).

== Qualification summary ==
A total of 22 nations qualified athletes.

NOC	Men	Women	Athletes
Argentina	1	1	2
Barbados	2	2	4
Bolivia		1	1
Brazil	4	4	8
Canada	4	4	8
Chile	2	2	4
Colombia		1	1
Costa Rica	1	1	2
Cuba	3	3	6
Dominican Republic	3	3	6
Ecuador	1	1	2
El Salvador	1	1	2
Guatemala	4	3	7
Guyana	1	1	2
Jamaica	2	2	4
Mexico	3	3	6
Panama	1	1	2
Peru	4	4	8
Suriname	2		2
Trinidad and Tobago		1	1
United States	4	4	8
Venezuela	1	1	2
Total: 22 NOC's	44	44	88

== Qualification standings ==
Rank	Quota	NOC	Ranking points
–	8	Peru (host nation)	70,863
1	8	Canada	160,951
2	8	United States	103,164
3	8	Brazil	77,883
4	7	Guatemala	66,065
5	6	Cuba	64,900
6	6	Mexico	42,326
7	6	Dominican Republic	31,911
8	4	Barbados	19,330
9	4	Jamaica	17,923
10	4	Chile	17,190
11	4	Suriname	15,510
12	2	Costa Rica	12,920
13	2	Argentina	9,925
14	2	El Salvador	9,580
15	2	Venezuela	9,340
16	2	Ecuador	8,260
17	2	Panama	5,550
18	1	Trinidad and Tobago	5,320
19	2	Guyana	4,680
20	1	Bolivia	350
20	1	Colombia	0

- Suriname declined two female quotas and these were reallocated to Bolivia and Colombia.
- Trinidad and Tobago declined one male quota, which was redistributed to Guatemala.
