= Tennis at the 2020 Summer Olympics – Qualification =

Qualification
- Tennis at the 2020 Summer Olympics

Events
Singles	men	women
Doubles	men	women	mixed
Qualification
- Summer Olympics

Qualification for tennis at the 2020 Summer Olympics in Tokyo, Japan was determined primarily by the rankings maintained by the Association of Tennis Professionals (ATP) and the Women's Tennis Association (WTA). The 2020 Summer Olympics were postponed to 2021 due to the COVID-19 pandemic.

== Qualifying criteria ==
The main qualifying criterion will be players' positions on the ATP and WTA ranking lists published on 14 June 2021 (after 2021 French Open). The players entering were formally submitted by the International Tennis Federation. The ATP and WTA rankings were based on performances from the previous 52 weeks, and there were several tournaments in the two-month period between the time of the rankings being frozen for entry and the beginning of the tennis events at the Olympics. Players had to be part of a nominated team for three Billie Jean King Cup (women) or Davis Cup (men) events between the 2016 and 2020 Olympics. This requirement was reduced to two Fed/Davis Cup events during the Olympic cycle from 2016 to 2020 if their nation competed at the Zone Group round robin level for three of the four years or if the player had represented their nation at least twenty times. All players were required to have been part of a nominated team for a Fed/Davis Cup event in 2019 or 2020, and to have had a good standing with their National Olympic Committee.

Each National Olympic Committee (NOC) could enter 6 male and 6 female athletes, with a maximum of 4 entries in the individual events, and 2 pairs in the doubles events. A total of 172 athletes will qualify to compete.

For the singles competitions, the top 56 players in the world rankings on a later date to be announced of the WTA and ATP tours are qualified for the Olympics. However, entry has been limited to four players from a country. This means that players who are ranked in the top 56 but represent the NOCs with four higher-ranked players already participating do not qualify, allowing players who are ranked outside of the top 56 but from countries with fewer than four players already qualified to compete. A player could only participate if they been part of a final nominated team to represent their country in Davis Cup or Billie Jean King Cup (formerly known as Fed Cup) ties on three occasions during the olympic cycle, with one of the years featuring a nomination being either 2019 or 2020–21. The required nominations was reduced to two if the player represented a nation spending at least three of the four seasons in the Olympic cycle on the zonal level of the relevant Cup or had been nominated for at least 20 ties during their career. Six of the remaining eight slots will be allocated by continent: two in the 2019 Pan American Games, one in the 2018 Asian Games, one in the 2019 African Games, and one each for Europe and Oceania for the highest-ranked athlete from an NOC with no other qualifiers. The final two spots are reserved, one for the host nation and one for a previous Olympic gold medalist or Grand Slam champion who didn't secure a direct entry.

In the men's and women's doubles competitions, 32 teams qualify. Up to 10 places are reserved for players in the top 10 of the doubles ranking, who could select any player from their NOC ranked in the top 300. Slots were then allocated to teams with the best combined ranking until 24 teams had been qualified. If the quota of 86 players in the relevant gender had not yet been met, additional places continued to be allotted via combined ranking. Once the quota was met, remaining teams with both players qualified in the singles were selected based on their best combined ranking. If this resulted in fewer than 32 teams, additional places were assigned to teams with one player qualified in singles, followed by remaining teams without any singles-qualified players if necessary. One team per gender was reserved for the host nation.

No quota spots are available for mixed doubles; instead, all teams have to consist of players already on site having qualified in the singles or doubles. Fifteen teams, based on combined ranking, and the host nation qualified.

== Qualified players ==
^{a}	Player did not participate as a result of injury, chose not to compete or was not selected by their governing body
^{b}	Player has not met the minimum Fed Cup / Davis Cup representation level
^{c}	Player is ineligible due quota limitations on athletes form a single country
^{d}	Player has retired from the sport
^{e}	Player received special dispensation for the Davis Cup / Fed Cup requirements from the ITF

=== Men's singles ===
No.	Rank	Player	NOC	ATP Points	NOC Rank
World Ranking
1	1	Novak Djokovic	Serbia	12,113	1
2	2	Daniil Medvedev	ROC	10,143	1
^{a}	3	Rafael Nadal	Spain	8,630	–
3	4	Stefanos Tsitsipas	Greece	7,980	1
^{a}	5	Dominic Thiem	Austria	7,425	–
4	6	Alexander Zverev	Germany	7,350	1
5	7	Andrey Rublev	ROC	5,910	2
^{a}	8	Roger Federer	Switzerland	5,065	–
^{a}	9	Matteo Berrettini	Italy	4,103	–
^{a}	10	Roberto Bautista Agut	Spain	3,170	–
6	11	Diego Schwartzman	Argentina	3,105	1
7	12	Pablo Carreño Busta	Spain	2,905	1
^{a}	13	David Goffin	Belgium	2,830	–
^{a}	14	Denis Shapovalov	Canada	2,780	–
^{a}	15	Casper Ruud	Norway	2,690	–
8	16	Gaël Monfils	France	2,568	1
9	17	Hubert Hurkacz	Poland	2,533	1
^{a}	18	Milos Raonic	Canada	2,473	–
^{a}	19	Cristian Garín	Chile	2,440	–
^{b}	20	Grigor Dimitrov	Bulgaria	2,431	–
10	21	Félix Auger-Aliassime	Canada	2,423	1
^{a}	22	Alex de Minaur	Australia	2,350	–
^{a}	23	Jannik Sinner	Italy	2,320	–
11^{e}	24	Aslan Karatsev	ROC	2,274	3
^{a}	25	Daniel Evans	Great Britain	2,106	–
12	26	Lorenzo Sonego	Italy	2,042	1
13	27	Karen Khachanov	ROC	2,010	4
^{a}	28	Stan Wawrinka	Switzerland	1,966	–
14	29	Fabio Fognini	Italy	1,843	2
15	30	Nikoloz Basilashvili	Georgia	1,820	1
16	31	Ugo Humbert	France	1,815	2
^{a}	32	Reilly Opelka	United States	1,806	–
^{a}	33	John Isner	United States	1,775	–
^{a}	34	Borna Ćorić	Croatia	1,758	–
17	35	Alejandro Davidovich Fokina	Spain	1,723	2
^{a}	36	Taylor Fritz	United States	1,715	–
18	37	Marin Čilić	Croatia	1,615	1
^{a}	38	Albert Ramos Viñolas	Spain	1,595	–
19	39	Alexander Bublik	Kazakhstan	1,591	1
^{a}	40	Dušan Lajović	Serbia	1,540	–
^{a}	41	Cameron Norrie	Great Britain	1,510	–
^{a}	42	Adrian Mannarino	France	1,501	–
20	43	John Millman	Australia	1,496	1
^{a}	44	Filip Krajinović	Serbia	1,479	–
21	45	Jan-Lennard Struff	Germany	1,455	2
^{a}	46	Benoît Paire	France	1,387	–
22	47	Miomir Kecmanović	Serbia	1,384	2
^{a}	48	Federico Delbonis	Argentina	1,360	–
23	49	Márton Fucsovics	Hungary	1,344	1
24^{e}	50	Tommy Paul	United States	1,225	1
^{a}	51	Lloyd Harris	South Africa	1,198	–
^{b}	52	Sebastian Korda	United States	1,187	–
25	53	Dominik Koepfer	Germany	1,170	3
^{a}	54	Richard Gasquet	France	1,168	–
^{a}	55	Laslo Đere	Serbia	1,168	–
26	56	Yoshihito Nishioka	Japan	1,142	1
27	57	Kei Nishikori	Japan	1,138	2
^{a}	58	Nick Kyrgios	Australia	1,135	–
28	59	Jérémy Chardy	France	1,133	3
^{b}	60	Aljaž Bedene	Slovenia	1,121	–
29^{e} (Note: The player qualified as a result of a late withdrawal of one of the original official entrants.)	61	Lorenzo Musetti	Italy	1,120	3
^{a}	62	Guido Pella	Argentina	1,114	–
^{a}	63	Sam Querrey	United States	1,113	–
^{a}	64	Feliciano López	Spain	1,080	–
30	65	Frances Tiafoe	United States	1,078	2
^{a}	66	Vasek Pospisil	Canada	1,033	–
^{a}	67	Alexei Popyrin	Australia	1,030	–
31^{e}	68	Tennys Sandgren	United States	1,011	3
^{b}	69	Jaume Munar	Spain	1,009	–
32^{e}	70	Pablo Andújar	Spain	1,005	3
33	71	Gilles Simon	France	973	4
34	71^{PR(624)}	Lu Yen-hsun	Chinese Taipei	45	1
^{a}	72	Steve Johnson	United States	958	–
^{a}	73	Jiří Veselý	Czech Republic	954	–
^{a}	74	Emil Ruusuvuori	Finland	951	–
35^{e}	75	Marcos Giron	United States	945	4
36	76	Egor Gerasimov	Belarus	937	1
^{a}	77	Kyle Edmund	Great Britain	935	–
^{b}	78	Carlos Alcaraz	Spain	924	–
37	79	Kwon Soon-woo	South Korea	921	1
^{c}	80	Jo-Wilfried Tsonga	France	902	–
^{a}	81	Jordan Thompson	Australia	900	–
^{c}	82	Gianluca Mager	Italy	893	–
38	83	Thiago Monteiro	Brazil	891	1
^{a}	84	Ričardas Berankis	Lithuania	884	–
^{a}	85	Pablo Cuevas	Uruguay	881	–
^{bc}	86	Marco Cecchinato	Italy	878	–
^{c}	87	Pierre-Hugues Herbert	France	875	–
^{c}	88	Stefano Travaglia	Italy	870	–
39	89	Norbert Gombos	Slovakia	867	1
40	90	Ilya Ivashka	Belarus	855	2
^{c}	91	Andreas Seppi	Italy	854	–
41	92	James Duckworth	Australia	851	2
^{a}	93	Radu Albot	Moldova	848	–
^{bc}	94	Corentin Moutet	France	838	–
^{c}	95	Lucas Pouille	France	835	–
42	96	Facundo Bagnis	Argentina	828	2
43	96^{PR(128)}	Philipp Kohlschreiber	Germany	617	4
^{bc}	97	Salvatore Caruso	Italy	814	–
^{a}	98	Mikael Ymer	Sweden	796	–
^{bc}	99	Yannick Hanfmann	Germany	793	–
44^{e}	100	Roberto Carballés Baena	Spain	786	4
^{b}	101	Kevin Anderson	South Africa	775	–
^{c}	102	Fernando Verdasco	Spain	760	–
45^{e}	103	Federico Coria	Argentina	755	3
46	104	Taro Daniel	Japan	751	3
47	105	Mikhail Kukushkin	Kazakhstan	740	2
^{bc}	106	Pedro Martínez	Spain	736	–
48	107	Yūichi Sugita	Japan	730	4
49	108	Pedro Sousa	Portugal	718	1
50	109	João Sousa	Portugal	714	2
^{a}	110	Dennis Novak	Austria	714	–
51	111	Daniel Elahi Galán	Colombia	711	1
52	112	Kamil Majchrzak	Poland	706	2
^{a}	113	Attila Balázs	Hungary	703	–
^{c}	114	Mackenzie McDonald	United States	700	–
^{a}	115	Andrej Martin	Slovakia	698	–
^{bc}	116	Yasutaka Uchiyama	Japan	697	–
53	117	Francisco Cerúndolo	Argentina	694	4
^{c}	118	Denis Kudla	United States	683	–
^{bc}	119	Arthur Rinderknech	France	677	–
^{a}	120	Tallon Griekspoor	Netherlands	673	–
^{bc}	121	Benjamin Bonzi	France	658	–
^{bc}	122	Bernabé Zapata Miralles	Spain	649	–
^{a}	123	Thiago Seyboth Wild	Brazil	643	–
54	124	Andy Murray	Great Britain	640	1
^{a}	125	Damir Džumhur	Bosnia and Herzegovina	638	–
^{a}	126	Jozef Kovalík	Slovakia	638	–
^{bc}	127	Juan Ignacio Londero	Argentina	636	–
55	129	Hugo Dellien	Bolivia	610	1
^{bc}	130	Grégoire Barrère	France	609	–
^{b}	131	Christopher O'Connell	Australia	609	–
^{c}	132	Peter Gojowczyk	Germany	608	–
56 (Note: The player received one of the reallocated unused quotas.)	133	Juan Pablo Varillas	Peru	599	1
^{bc}	134	Carlos Taberner	Spain	582	–
^{a}	135	Jurij Rodionov	Austria	579	–
^{bc}	136	Cedrik-Marcel Stebe	Germany	570	–
^{a}	137	Henri Laaksonen	Switzerland	552	–
^{bc}	138	Brandon Nakashima	United States	549	–
^{a}	139	Botic van de Zandschulp	Netherlands	540	–
^{c}	140	Evgeny Donskoy	ROC	537	–
^{c}	141	Juan Manuel Cerúndolo	Argentina	532	–
^{bc}	142	Federico Gaio	Italy	523	–
^{bc}	143	J. J. Wolf	United States	512	–
57	144	Sumit Nagal	India	511	1
Eu1	145	Tomáš Macháč	Czech Republic	507	1
58	146	Liam Broady	Great Britain	499	2
Continental places
Eu1	145	Tomáš Macháč	Czech Republic	See World Ranking above	
Af1	165	Mohamed Safwat	Egypt	431	1
As1	187	Denis Istomin	Uzbekistan	371	1
Am1	206	João Menezes	Brazil	333	2
Am2	232	Tomás Barrios	Chile	293	1
Oc1	908	~~Ajeet Rai~~ (Note: Quota was reallocated to direct entry through rankings as the player hadn’t met the minimum ranking requirement (within top 300) for qualification.)	~~New Zealand~~	16	–
Legacy gold medalist / Grand Slam Champion
L1		Reallocated to direct entry			
Other entries (Note: The following entries were added to the entry list as late replacements instead of original entrants who had withdrawn.)
59	254	Lukáš Klein	Slovakia	241	2
Host Nation
H1		Reallocated to direct entry	Japan		

=== Women's singles ===
No.	Rank	Player	NOC	WTA Points	NOC Rank
World Ranking
1	1	Ashleigh Barty	Australia	8,245	1
2	2	Naomi Osaka	Japan	7,401	1
^{a}	3	Simona Halep	Romania	6,330	–
3	4	Aryna Sabalenka	Belarus	6,195	1
^{a}	5	Sofia Kenin	United States	5,865	–
4	6	Elina Svitolina	Ukraine	5,835	1
^{a}	7	Bianca Andreescu	Canada	5,265	–
^{a}	8	Serena Williams	United States	4,931	–
5	9	Iga Świątek	Poland	4,435	1
6	10	Karolína Plíšková	Czech Republic	4,285	1
7	11	Petra Kvitová	Czech Republic	4,115	2
8	12	Belinda Bencic	Switzerland	4,080	1
9	13	Garbiñe Muguruza	Spain	4,000	1
10	14	Jennifer Brady	United States	3,840	1
11	15	Barbora Krejčíková	Czech Republic	3,733	3
^{a}	16	Victoria Azarenka	Belarus	3,696	–
12	17	Elise Mertens	Belgium	3,685	1
13	18	Maria Sakkari	Greece	3,480	1
14	19	Anastasia Pavlyuchenkova	ROC	3,300	1
15	20	Kiki Bertens	Netherlands	3,220	1
16^{e}	21	Elena Rybakina	Kazakhstan	3,043	1
^{c}	22	Karolína Muchová	Czech Republic	2,876	–
^{a}	23	Coco Gauff	United States	2,780	–
17	24	Ons Jabeur	Tunisia	2,415	1
^{b}	25	Petra Martić	Croatia	2,360	–
18	26	Jessica Pegula	United States	2,339	2
^{a}	27	Angelique Kerber	Germany	2,320	–
^{a}	28	Madison Keys	United States	2,306	–
19	29	Anett Kontaveit	Estonia	2,265	1
^{a}	30	Johanna Konta	Great Britain	2,265	–
20	31	Alison Riske	United States	2,181	3
21	32	Veronika Kudermetova	ROC	2,100	2
22^{e}	33	Paula Badosa	Spain	2,060	2
23	34	Ekaterina Alexandrova	ROC	1,940	3
^{a}	35	Daria Kasatkina	ROC	1,860	–
^{a}	36	Zhang Shuai	China	1,798	–
24	37	Dayana Yastremska	Ukraine	1,765	2
As1	38	Wang Qiang	China	1,700	1
^{a}	39	Svetlana Kuznetsova	ROC	1,692	–
Am1	40	Nadia Podoroska	Argentina	1,687	1
25	41	Markéta Vondroušová	Czech Republic	1,686	4
26	42	Yulia Putintseva	Kazakhstan	1,685	2
27	43	Jeļena Ostapenko	Latvia	1,680	1
28	44	Magda Linette	Poland	1,698	2
^{a}	45	Sorana Cîrstea	Romania	1,614	–
^{c}	46	Shelby Rogers	United States	1,558	–
^{a}	47	Tamara Zidanšek	Slovenia	1,550	–
29	47^{PR(435)}	Yaroslava Shvedova	Kazakhstan	107	3
^{c}	48	Danielle Collins	United States	1,529	–
30	49	Fiona Ferro	France	1,500	1
^{bc}	50	Marie Bouzková	Czech Republic	1,475	–
31	51	Zheng Saisai	China	1,460	2
^{a}	52	Jil Teichmann	Switzerland	1,460	–
32	52^{PR(357)}	Elena Vesnina	ROC	141	4
33	53	Sara Sorribes Tormo	Spain	1,440	3
34	54	Donna Vekić	Croatia	1,440	1
35	55	Laura Siegemund	Germany	1,428	1
^{d}	56	Barbora Strýcová	Czech Republic	1,412	–
36	57	Anastasija Sevastova	Latvia	1,405	2
37	58	Rebecca Peterson	Sweden	1,330	1
38	59	Kristina Mladenovic	France	1,320	2
^{a}	60	Danka Kovinić	Montenegro	1,330	–
^{b}	61	Patricia Maria Țig	Romania	1,264	–
^{b}	62	Hsieh Su-wei	Chinese Taipei	1,263	–
39	63	Alizé Cornet	France	1,240	3
40	64	Alison Van Uytvanck	Belgium	1,235	2
^{a}	65	Marta Kostyuk	Ukraine	1,170	–
41	66	Leylah Annie Fernandez	Canada	1,159	1
^{c}	67	Sloane Stephens	United States	1,157	–
^{bc}	68	Ann Li	United States	1,142	–
42	68^{PR(138)}	Carla Suárez Navarro	Spain	582	4
^{bc}	69	Bernarda Pera	United States	1,140	–
43	70	Heather Watson	Great Britain	1,129	1
44	71	Viktorija Golubic	Switzerland	1,126	2
45	72	Ajla Tomljanović	Australia	1,110	2
^{b}	73	Polona Hercog	Slovenia	1,106	–
46	74	Caroline Garcia	France	1,100	4
^{c}	75	Kateřina Siniaková	Czech Republic	1,085	–
47	76	Camila Giorgi	Italy	1,080	1
^{a}	77	Kaia Kanepi	Estonia	1,048	–
^{a}	78	Irina-Camelia Begu	Romania	1,044	–
^{c}	79	Amanda Anisimova	United States	1,040	–
^{c}	80	Madison Brengle	United States	1,025	–
48	81	Misaki Doi	Japan	1,021	2
^{c}	82	Anastasia Potapova	ROC	1,001	–
^{a}	83	Arantxa Rus	Netherlands	1,001	–
49	84	Nao Hibino	Japan	993	3
50	85	Nina Stojanović	Serbia	983	1
^{bc}	86	Varvara Gracheva	ROC	966	–
51	87	Jasmine Paolini	Italy	958	2
^{c}	88	Anna Blinkova	ROC	940	–
^{c}	89	Lauren Davis	United States	930	–
^{bc}	90	Tereza Martincová	Czech Republic	910	–
52	90^{PR(279)}	Ivana Jorović	Serbia	240	2
^{b}	91	Ana Bogdan	Romania	880	–
^{c}	92	Kristýna Plíšková	Czech Republic	870	–
^{a}	93	Clara Tauson	Denmark	870	–
53	94	Camila Osorio	Colombia	868	1
^{a}	95	Kirsten Flipkens	Belgium	862	–
^{bc}	96	Christina McHale	United States	847	–
^{c}	97	Vera Zvonareva	ROC	847	–
^{a}	98	Martina Trevisan	Italy	841	–
^{b}	99	Zhu Lin	China	837	–
^{bc}	100	Margarita Gasparyan	ROC	826	–
^{a}	101	Aliaksandra Sasnovich	Belarus	818	–
54	101^{PR(187)}	Mona Barthel	Germany	366	2
55	102	Zarina Diyas	Kazakhstan	816	4
^{c}	103	Venus Williams	United States	814	–
^{a}	104	Kaja Juvan	Slovenia	783	–
Eu1	104^{PR(160)}	Mihaela Buzărnescu	Romania	485	1
^{a}	105	Viktoriya Tomova	Bulgaria	775	–
^{bc}	106	Liudmila Samsonova	ROC	756	–
56	107	Sara Errani	Italy	754	3
^{c}	108	Anna Kalinskaya	ROC	751	–
57	109	Anna-Lena Friedsam	Germany	749	3
Continental places
As1	38	Wang Qiang	China	See World Ranking above	
Am1	40	Nadia Podoroska	Argentina	See World Ranking above	
Eu1	104^{PR(160)}	Mihaela Buzărnescu	Romania	See World Ranking above	
Af1	117	Mayar Sherif	Egypt	696	1
Am2	191	Verónica Cepede Royg (Note: Quota was passed from 2019 Pan American Games silver medalist Caroline Dolehide to the next highest placed competitor at the Pan American Games as four athletes from the United States had already qualified.)	Paraguay	363	1
Oc1	434	~~Paige Hourigan~~	~~New Zealand~~	108	–
Legacy gold medalist / Grand Slam Champion
L1	145	Samantha Stosur (Note: 2011 US Open Singles champion. Quota was passed from four-time Olympic gold medalist and multiple Grand Slam Champion Venus Williams as four athletes from the United States had already qualified. Defending women's singles champion Monica Puig would have been entered into the draw, but withdrew due to ongoing shoulder injury.)	Australia	545	3
Other entries
58	137	Renata Zarazúa	Mexico	582	1
Host Nation
H1		Reallocated to direct entry	Japan		

=== Men's doubles ===
No.	CR^{*}	Player A			Player B			NOC
No.	CR^{*}	SR^{†}	DR^{‡}	Name	SR^{†}	DR^{‡}	Name	NOC
World Ranking
1	3	–	1	Mate Pavić	–	2	Nikola Mektić	Croatia
2	10	305	3	Nicolas Mahut	87	7	Pierre-Hugues Herbert	France
3	9	–	4	Robert Farah	–	5	Juan Sebastián Cabal	Colombia
4	71	–	6	Horacio Zeballos	–	65	Andrés Molteni	Argentina
5	45	–	8	Ivan Dodig	37	235	Marin Čilić	Croatia
6	250	–	9	Filip Polášek	254	241	Lukáš Klein	Slovakia
7	115	–	10	Joe Salisbury	124	105	Andy Murray	Great Britain
Combined Ranking
8	26	2	237	Daniil Medvedev	24	232	Aslan Karatsev	ROC
9	34	7	71	Andrey Rublev	27	92	Karen Khachanov	ROC
10	34	17	73	Hubert Hurkacz	–	17	Łukasz Kubot	Poland
11	40	–	19	Neal Skupski	–	21	Jamie Murray	Great Britain
12	41	–	14	Wesley Koolhof	–	27	Jean-Julien Rojer	Netherlands
13	47	12	68	Pablo Carreño Busta	35	220	Alejandro Davidovich Fokina	Spain
14	51	6	112	Alexander Zverev	45	56	Jan-Lennard Struff	Germany
15	57	–	28	Joran Vliegen	–	29	Sander Gillé	Belgium
16	60	688	20	Kevin Krawietz	1182	40	Tim Pütz	Germany
17	61	–	15	Michael Venus	–	46	Marcus Daniell	New Zealand
18	66	–	18	Marcelo Melo	–	48	Marcelo Demoliner	Brazil
19	66	–	30	Oliver Marach	–	36	Philipp Oswald	Austria
20	69	280	44	Max Purcell	–	25	John Peers	Australia
21	72	26	409	Yoshihito Nishioka	46	781	Taro Daniel	Japan
22	73	16	–	Gaël Monfils	59	57	Jérémy Chardy	France
23	76	–	11	Rajeev Ram	65	198	Frances Tiafoe	United States
24	76	407	33	Luke Saville	43	251	John Millman	Australia
Singles Priority
25	78	39	49	Alexander Bublik	856	39	Andrey Golubev	Kazakhstan
26	87	26	160	Lorenzo Sonego	61	305	Lorenzo Musetti^{e}	Italy
27	107	11	139	Diego Schwartzman	96	166	Facundo Bagnis	Argentina
28	118	–	50	Austin Krajicek	68	207	Tennys Sandgren	United States
29	166	90	1071	Ilya Ivashka	76	905	Egor Gerasimov	Belarus
30	170	70	131	Pablo Andújar	100	163	Roberto Carballés Baena	Spain
31	204	109	96	João Sousa	108	316	Pedro Sousa	Portugal
Host
H1	99	–	42	Ben McLachlan	57	815	Kei Nishikori	Japan

^* Combined ranking. The best ranking (singles or doubles) of Player A is added to that of Player B to calculate the combined ranking.

^† Singles ranking on 14 June 2021.

^‡ Doubles ranking on 14 June 2021.

=== Women's doubles ===
No.	CR^{*}	Player A			Player B			NOC
No.	CR^{*}	SR^{†}	DR^{‡}	Name	SR^{†}	DR^{‡}	Name	NOC
World Ranking
1	3	15	1	Barbora Krejčíková	75	2	Kateřina Siniaková	Czech Republic
2	27	52^{PR(357)}	1^{PR(141)}	Elena Vesnina	32	26	Veronika Kudermetova	ROC
3	77	59	3	Kristina Mladenovic	74	125	Caroline Garcia	France
^{b}		62	4	Hsieh Su-Wei				Chinese Taipei
^{d}		56	5	Barbora Strycová				Czech Republic
^{a}			6	Tímea Babos				Hungary
4	71	17	7	Elise Mertens	64	100	Alison Van Uytvanck	Belgium
^{a}		4	8	Aryna Sabalenka				Belarus
5	40	1098	9	Nicole Melichar^{e}	31	78	Alison Riske	United States
6	104	–	9^{PR(160)}	Sania Mirza	181	95	Ankita Raina	India
7	30	–	10	Demi Schuurs	20	109	Kiki Bertens	Netherlands
Combined Ranking
8	36	–	18	Latisha Chan	–	18	Chan Hao-ching	Chinese Taipei
9	39	269	13	Bethanie Mattek-Sands	26	57	Jessica Pegula	United States
10	40	519	11	Gabriela Dabrowski	–	29	Sharon Fichman	Canada
11	43	6	656	Elina Svitolina	37	138	Dayana Yastremska	Ukraine
12	51	10	68	Karolína Plíšková	41	122	Markéta Vondroušová	Czech Republic
13	58	–	12	Xu Yifan	740	46	Yang Zhaoxuan	China
14	62	1	27	Ashleigh Barty	149	61	Storm Sanders	Australia
~~15~~	~~76~~	–	~~22~~	~~Darija Jurak~~	~~54~~	~~174~~	~~Donna Vekić~~	~~Croatia~~
16	77	43	20	Jeļena Ostapenko	57	209	Anastasija Sevastova	Latvia
17	81	13	342	Garbiñe Muguruza	68^{PR(138)}	1321	Carla Suárez Navarro	Spain
18	81	725	38	Duan Yingying	51	43	Zheng Saisai	China
19	83	12	133	Belinda Bencic	71	124	Viktorija Golubic	Switzerland
20	87	33	357	Paula Badosa	54	70	Sara Sorribes Tormo	Spain
21	87	55	33	Laura Siegemund	109	54	Anna-Lena Friedsam	Germany
22	91	–	40	Raluca Olaru	191	51	Monica Niculescu	Romania
23	93	897	45	Nadiia Kichenok	–	48	Lyudmyla Kichenok	Ukraine
Singles Priority
24	111	85	53	Nina Stojanović	246	58	Aleksandra Krunić	Serbia
25	112	49	629	Fiona Ferro	63	172	Alizé Cornet	France
26	121	921	56	Makoto Ninomiya	84	65	Nao Hibino	Japan
27	132	44	87	Magda Linette	–	88	Alicja Rosolska	Poland
28	136	229	50	Ellen Perez	145	86	Samantha Stosur	Australia
Other entries
29	165	446	28	Giuliana Olmos	137	245	Renata Zarazúa	Mexico
30	213	788	23	Luisa Stefani	314	190	Laura Pigossi	Brazil
31	364	–	175	Hsieh Yu-chieh	515	189	Hsu Chieh-yu	Chinese Taipei
Alternates
Alt	194	87	164	Jasmine Paolini	107	156	Sara Errani	Italy
Host
H1	28	1354	14	Shuko Aoyama	492	14	Ena Shibahara	Japan

^* Combined ranking. The best ranking (singles or doubles) of Player A is added to that of Player B to calculate the combined ranking.

^† Singles ranking on 14 June 2021.

^‡ Doubles ranking on 14 June 2021.

=== Mixed doubles ===
No.	CR^{*}	Player A			Player B			NOC
No.	CR^{*}	SR^{†}	DR^{‡}	Name	SR^{†}	DR^{‡}	Name	NOC
Combined Ranking
1	6	59	3	Kristina Mladenovic	305	3	Nicolas Mahut	France
2	22	18	228	Maria Sakkari	4	148	Stefanos Tsitsipas	Greece
3	24	269	13	Bethanie Mattek-Sands	–	11	Rajeev Ram	United States
4	25	52^{PR(357)}	1^{PR(141)}	Elena Vesnina	24	232	Aslan Karatsev	ROC
5	26	1	27	Ashleigh Barty	–	25	John Peers	Australia
6	26	19	83	Anastasia Pavlyuchenkova	7	71	Andrey Rublev	ROC
7	26	9	42	Iga Świątek	–	17	Łukasz Kubot	Poland
8	30	–	22	Darija Jurak	–	8	Ivan Dodig	Croatia
9	32	519	11	Gabriela Dabrowski	21	81	Félix Auger-Aliassime	Canada
10	41	788	23	Luisa Stefani	–	18	Marcelo Melo	Brazil
~~11~~	~~45~~	~~33~~	~~357~~	~~Paula Badosa~~	~~12~~	~~68~~	~~Pablo Carreño Busta~~	~~Spain~~
12	46	40	69	Nadia Podoroska	–	6	Horacio Zeballos	Argentina
13	53	55	33	Laura Siegemund	688	20	Kevin Krawietz	Germany
14	53	47^{PR(435)}	14^{PR}	Yaroslava Shvedova	856	39	Andrey Golubev	Kazakhstan
15	54	85	53	Nina Stojanović	1	219	Novak Djokovic	Serbia
Alternates
Alt	56	49	629	Fiona Ferro	87	7	Pierre-Hugues Herbert	France
Host
H1	56	492	14	Ena Shibahara	–	42	Ben McLachlan	Japan

^* Combined ranking. The best ranking (singles or doubles) of Player A is added to that of Player B to calculate the combined ranking.

^† Singles ranking on 14 June 2021.

^‡ Doubles ranking on 14 June 2021.

^{a}	Player did not participate as a result of injury, chose not to compete or was not selected by their governing body
^{b}	Player has not met the minimum Fed Cup / Davis Cup representation level
^{c}	Player is ineligible due to too many players from a certain country
^{d}	Player has retired from the sport
^{e}	Player received special dispensation for the Davis Cup / Fed Cup requirements from the ITF
