= Taekwondo at the 2019 Pan American Games – Qualification =

The following is the qualification system and qualified athletes for the Taekwondo at the 2019 Pan American Games competitions.

== Qualification timeline ==
Events	Date	Venue
Pan American Games Qualification Tournament	March 7–8, 2019	(Dominican Republic) Santo Domingo

== Qualification system ==
A total of 140 taekwondo athletes will qualify to compete. Each nation may enter a maximum of 13 athletes (eight in Kyorugi and five in Poomsae). The host nation, Peru, automatically qualifies the maximum number of athletes (13) and is entered in each event. There will also nine wild card spots awarded in Kyorugi. The spots were awarded at the qualification tournament held in Santo Domingo in March 2019.

In the Kyorugi discipline, a total of 12 athletes (8 in the +67 kg event for women) will qualify along with one spot in each event for the host nation. In Poomsae, the top five nations in the mixed teams event along with Peru as host nation will qualify a team of five athletes. An extra quota was also awarded in the women's individual event. In poomsae, countries with qualified teams can enter three men and two women, or two men and three women.

== Qualification summary ==
NOC	Men					Women					Mixed		Total
NOC	58 kg	68 kg	80 kg	+80 kg	PO I.	49 kg	57 kg	67 kg	+67 kg	PO I.	PO MP.	PO MT.	Total
Argentina	X			X		X	X	X					5
Aruba				X									1
Barbados				X									1
Brazil	X	X	X	X		X	X	X	X				8
Canada	X	X	X	X	X	X	X	X	X	X	X	X	13
Chile	X	X		X			X	X					5
Colombia	X	X	X	X		X	X	X	X				8
Costa Rica	X	X					X	X					4
Cuba		X	X	X		X	X	X	X				7
Dominican Republic	X	X	X	X			X	X	X				7
Ecuador	X	X	X	X		X	X			X			7
Guatemala					X	X				X	X	X	6
Guyana		X											1
Haiti									X				1
Honduras			X					X	X				3
Jamaica		X											1
Mexico	X	X	X	X	X	X	X	X	X	X	X	X	13
Nicaragua	X					X							2
Panama							X						1
Peru	X	X	X	X	X	X	X	X	X	X	X	X	13
Puerto Rico		X	X	X	X	X			X	X	X	X	10
Suriname		X											1
Trinidad and Tobago									X				1
United States	X	X	X	X	X	X	X	X	X	X	X	X	13
Uruguay			X										1
Venezuela	X		X	X		X	X	X	X				7
Total: 26 NOCs	13	15	13	15	6	13	14	13	13	7	6	6	140

== Kyorugi ==
- Countries qualified are listed in random order as the nature of the tournament did not determine medalists.

=== Men's 58 kg ===
Competition	Quotas	Qualified
Host Nation	1	Peru
Pan American Games Qualification Tournament	12	Argentina; Colombia; Costa Rica; Venezuela; Mexico; Canada; Chile; Brazil; Nicaragua; United States; Dominican Republic; Ecuador
TOTAL	13	

=== Men's 68 kg ===
Competition	Quotas	Qualified
Host Nation	1	Peru
Pan American Games Qualification Tournament	12	Brazil; Costa Rica; Canada; Dominican Republic; Chile; United States; Suriname; Mexico; Colombia; Cuba; Ecuador; Puerto Rico
Wildcard	2	Guyana; Jamaica
TOTAL	15	

=== Men's 80 kg ===
Competition	Quotas	Qualified
Host Nation	1	Peru
Pan American Games Qualification Tournament	12	Colombia; Ecuador; Puerto Rico; Brazil; Mexico; Canada; Cuba; Dominican Republic; Uruguay; Venezuela; United States; Honduras
TOTAL	13	

=== Men's +80 kg ===
Competition	Quotas	Qualified
Host Nation	1	Peru
Pan American Games Qualification Tournament	12	United States; Chile; Cuba; Brazil; Canada; Argentina; Ecuador; Mexico; Colombia; Dominican Republic; Venezuela; Puerto Rico
Wildcard	2	Aruba; Barbados
TOTAL	15	

=== Women's 49 kg ===
Competition	Quotas	Qualified
Host Nation	1	Peru
Pan American Games Qualification Tournament	11	Canada; Argentina; Mexico; Puerto Rico; Colombia; Venezuela; Guatemala; Brazil; United States; Nicaragua; Ecuador; Cuba
TOTAL	13	

=== Women's 57 kg ===
Competition	Quotas	Qualified
Host Nation	1	Peru
Pan American Games Qualification Tournament	12	Canada; United States; Ecuador; Colombia; Mexico; Dominican Republic; Venezuela; Brazil; Chile; Argentina; Costa Rica; Cuba
Wildcard	1	Panama
TOTAL	14	

=== Women's 67 kg ===
Competition	Quotas	Qualified
Host Nation	1	Peru
Pan American Games Qualification Tournament	12	United States; Argentina; Brazil; Mexico; Dominican Republic; Colombia; Chile; Canada; Costa Rica; Cuba; Honduras; Venezuela
TOTAL	13	

=== Women's +67 kg ===
Competition	Quotas	Qualified
Host Nation	1	Peru
Pan American Games Qualification Tournament	8	Mexico; Cuba; Brazil; Puerto Rico; Canada; Honduras; Colombia; United States
Wildcard	4	Dominican Republic; Haiti; Trinidad and Tobago; Venezuela
TOTAL	13	

== Poomsae ==
Competition	Athletes per NOC	Quotas	Qualified
Host Nation	5	5	Peru
Pan American Games Qualification Tournament	5	25	Mexico; Canada; Puerto Rico; United States; Guatemala
Pan American Games Qualification Tournament	1	1	Ecuador
TOTAL		31	
