= Golf at the 2019 Pan American Games – Qualification =

The following is the qualification system and qualified athletes for golf at the 2019 Pan American Games competitions.

== Qualification system ==
A total of 64 golfers (32 per gender) qualified to compete. Each nation was able to enter a maximum of 4 athletes (two per gender). The host nation, Peru, automatically qualified the maximum number of athletes (4). The rest of the spots were awarded across the Official World Golf Ranking and Women's World Golf Rankings as of May 7, 2019. Any remaining spots were allocated using the World Amateur Golf Ranking as of May 9, 2019.

An athlete must be ranked in the World Rankings, while not exceeding a handicap score of 4.0 if ranked in the World Amateur Golf Ranking. NOC's qualifying in both men and women also qualified for the mixed team event.

== Qualification summary ==
NOC	Men	Women	Mixed team	Athletes
Argentina	2	2	X	4
Barbados		1		1
Bolivia		2		2
Brazil	2	2	X	4
Canada	2	2	X	4
Chile	2	2	X	4
Colombia	2	2	X	4
Costa Rica	2			2
Dominican Republic	2	1	X	3
Ecuador	1	2	X	3
Guatemala	2	2	X	4
Mexico	2	2	X	4
Panama	2	1	X	3
Paraguay	2	2	X	4
Peru	2	2	X	4
Puerto Rico	1			1
Trinidad and Tobago		1		1
United States	2	2	X	4
Uruguay	2	2	X	4
Venezuela	2	2	X	4
Total: 20 NOC's	32	32	15	64
