= Tennis at the 2019 Pan American Games – Men's doubles =

Tennis – Men's doubles at the 2019 Pan American Games
- Venue: Club Lawn Tennis de La Exposcicion
- Dates: July 29 – August 3, 2019
- Competitors: 34 from 17 nations
- Teams: 17
- Gold medal match score: 6–4, 3–6, [10–8]

Medalists
Gold medal	Gonzalo Escobar; Roberto Quiroz	Ecuador
Silver medal	Guido Andreozzi; Facundo Bagnis	Argentina
Bronze medal	Sergio Galdós; Juan Pablo Varillas	Peru

Men's doubles
- Tennis at the 2019 Pan American Games

Events
Singles	men	women
Doubles	men	women	mixed
Qualification
- Pan American Games

The men's doubles tennis event of the 2019 Pan American Games was held from July 29 through August 3 at the Club Lawn Tennis de La Exposcicion in Lima, Peru.

Gonzalo Escobar and Roberto Quiroz of Ecuador won the gold medal, defeating Guido Andreozzi and Facundo Bagnis of Argentina in the final, 6–4, 3–6, [10–8].

Sergio Galdós and Juan Pablo Varillas of Peru won the bronze medal, defeating Boris Arias and Federico Zeballos of Bolivia in the bronze-medal match, 6–3, 3–6, [12–10].

== Seeds ==
1. Gonzalo Escobar / Roberto Quiroz (ECU) (champions, gold medalists)
2. Guido Andreozzi / Facundo Bagnis (ARG) (final, silver medalists)
3. Sergio Galdós / Juan Pablo Varillas (PER) (semifinals, bronze medalists)
4. Boris Arias / Federico Zeballos (BOL) (semifinals)
5. Alejandro González / Nicolás Mejía (COL) (quarterfinals)
6. Roberto Cid / Víctor Estrella (DOM) (quarterfinals)
7. João Menezes / Thiago Wild (BRA) (quarterfinals)
8. Tomás Barrios / Alejandro Tabilo (CHI) (quarterfinals)

== Draw ==
Key

- Q = Qualifier
- WC = Wild card
- LL = Lucky loser
- Alt = Alternate
- ITF = ITF entry
- PR = Protected ranking
- SR = Special ranking
- SE = Special exempt
- JE = Junior exempt
- JR = Junior Accelerator Programme entrant
- CO = College Accelerator Programme entrant
- NG = Next Gen Accelerator Program entrant
- w/o = Walkover
- r = Retired
- d = Defaulted

=== Finals ===
Semifinals
1	Gonzalo Escobar (ECU); Roberto Quiroz (ECU)	6	6
4	Boris Arias (BOL); Federico Zeballos (BOL)	3	4
3	Sergio Galdós (PER); Juan Pablo Varillas (PER)	1	5
2	Guido Andreozzi (ARG); Facundo Bagnis (ARG)	6	7

Final (gold-medal match)
1	Gonzalo Escobar (ECU); Roberto Quiroz (ECU)	6	3	[10]
2	Guido Andreozzi (ARG); Facundo Bagnis (ARG)	4	6	[8]
Bronze-medal match
4	Boris Arias (BOL); Federico Zeballos (BOL)	3	6	[10]
3	Sergio Galdós (PER); Juan Pablo Varillas (PER)	6	3	[12]

=== Top half ===
First round
A Alvarado (ESA); L Miralles (ESA)	1	1
K King (USA); Mi Redlicki (USA)	6	6

Second round
1	G Escobar (ECU); R Quiroz (ECU)	6	6
K King (USA); Mi Redlicki (USA)	3	0
Y Pérez (CUB); O Rivera (CUB)	3	2
8	T Barrios (CHI); A Tabilo (CHI)	6	6
4	B Arias (BOL); F Zeballos (BOL)	6	6
J Hernández (MEX); A Rubio (MEX)	1	2
F Llanes (URU); F Roncadelli (URU)	1	5
6	R Cid (DOM); V Estrella (DOM)	6	7

Quarterfinals
1	G Escobar (ECU); R Quiroz (ECU)	6	6
8	T Barrios (CHI); A Tabilo (CHI)	4	4
4	B Arias (BOL); F Zeballos (BOL)	6	6^{3}	[10]
6	R Cid (DOM); V Estrella (DOM)	2	7^{7}	[2]

Semifinals
1	G Escobar (ECU); R Quiroz (ECU)	6	6
4	B Arias (BOL); F Zeballos (BOL)	3	4

=== Bottom half ===
First round

Second round
7	J Menezes (BRA); T Wild (BRA)	6	6
S González (GUA); W González (GUA)	1	4
D King (BAR); H Lewis (BAR)	7^{8}	3	[8]
3	S Galdós (PER); JP Varillas (PER)	6^{6}	6	[10]
5	A González (COL); N Mejía (COL)	6	6
A Obando (HON); K Turcios (HON)	4	2
B Newman (BAH); J Roberts (BAH)	2	2
2	G Andreozzi (ARG); F Bagnis (ARG)	6	6

Quarterfinals
7	J Menezes (BRA); T Wild (BRA)	2	4
3	S Galdós (PER); JP Varillas (PER)	6	6
5	A González (COL); N Mejía (COL)	2	1
2	G Andreozzi (ARG); F Bagnis (ARG)	6	6

Semifinals
3	S Galdós (PER); JP Varillas (PER)	1	5
2	G Andreozzi (ARG); F Bagnis (ARG)	6	7
