= Tennis at the 2019 Pan American Games – Women's doubles =

Tennis – Women's doubles at the 2019 Pan American Games
- Venue: Club Lawn Tennis de La Exposcicion
- Dates: July 30 – August 3, 2019
- Competitors: 22 from 11 nations
- Teams: 11
- Gold medal match score: 6–0, 6–4

Medalists
Gold medal	Usue Arconada; Caroline Dolehide	United States
Silver medal	Verónica Cepede Royg; Montserrat González	Paraguay
Bronze medal	Carolina Alves; Luisa Stefani	Brazil

Women's doubles
- Tennis at the 2019 Pan American Games

Events
Singles	men	women
Doubles	men	women	mixed
Qualification
← 2015 ·	Pan American Games	· 2023 →

The women's doubles tennis event of the 2019 Pan American Games was held from July 30 through August 3 at the Club Lawn Tennis de La Exposcicion in Lima, Peru.

Usue Aroncada and Caroline Dolehide of the United States won the gold medal, defeating Verónica Cepede Royg and Montserrat González of Paraguay in the final, 6–0, 6–4.

Carolina Alves and Luisa Stefani of Brazil won the bronze medal, defeating Alexa Guarachi and Daniela Seguel of Chile in the Bronze-medal match, 2–6, 7–5, [11–9].

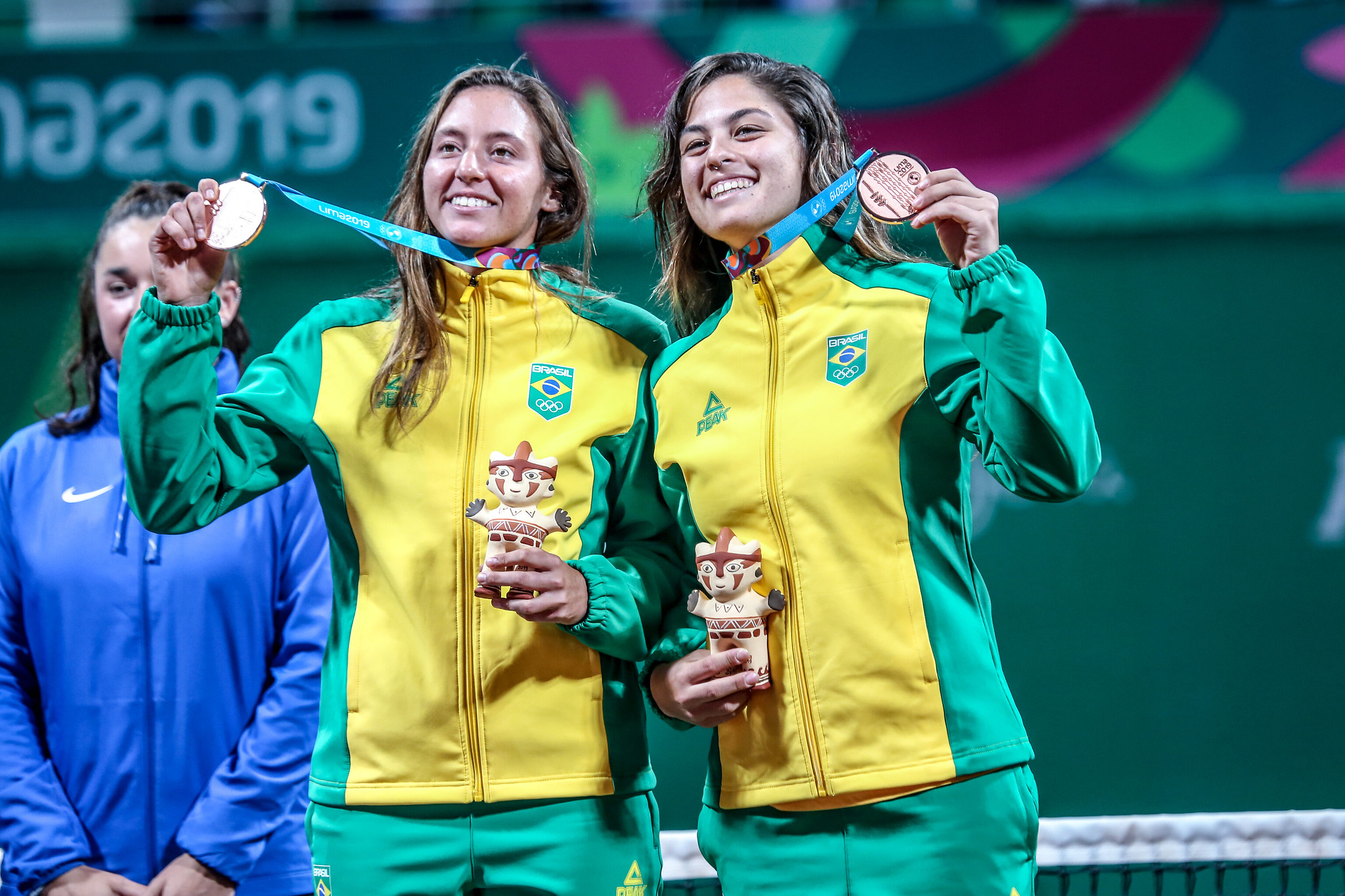
Brazilians Luisa Stefani and Carolina Meligeni Alves, bronze medalists

== Seeds ==
1. Usue Arconada / Caroline Dolehide (USA) (champions, gold medalists)
2. Giuliana Olmos / Renata Zarazúa (MEX) (quarterfinals)
3. Carolina Alves / Luisa Stefani (BRA) (semifinals, bronze medalists)
4. Alexa Guarachi / Daniela Seguel (CHI) (semifinals)

== Draw ==
=== Key ===
- Q = Qualifier
- WC = Wild card
- LL = Lucky loser
- Alt = Alternate
- ITF = ITF entry
- PR = Protected ranking
- SR = Special ranking
- SE = Special exempt
- JE = Junior exempt
- JR = Junior Accelerator Programme entrant
- CO = College Accelerator Programme entrant
- NG = Next Gen Accelerator Program entrant
- w/o = Walkover
- r = Retired
- d = Defaulted

=== Draw ===
First round
D Guzmán (PER); D Schaefer (PER)	6	6
J Bui (CAN); A Vagramov (CAN)	4	4
C Pella (ARG); N Podoroska (ARG)	6	6
M Morales (GUA); A Weedon (GUA)	1	1
V Cepede Royg (PAR); M González (PAR)	6	6
M Reasco (ECU); C Römer (ECU)	1	2

Quarterfinals
1	U Arconada (USA); C Dolehide (USA)	6	6
D Guzmán (PER); D Schaefer (PER)	1	1
4	A Guarachi (CHI); D Seguel (CHI)	6	6
E Arango (COL); MF Herazo (COL)	2	1
C Pella (ARG); N Podoroska (ARG)	2	2
3	C Alves (BRA); L Stefani (BRA)	6	6
V Cepede Royg (PAR); M González (PAR)	6^{2}	6	[10]
2	G Olmos (MEX); R Zarazúa (MEX)	7^{7}	3	[4]

Semifinals
1	U Arconada (USA); C Dolehide (USA)	7	6
4	A Guarachi (CHI); D Seguel (CHI)	5	3
3	C Alves (BRA); L Stefani (BRA)	5	7^{12}	[4]
V Cepede Royg (PAR); M González (PAR)	7	6^{10}	[10]

Final (gold-medal match)
1	U Arconada (USA); C Dolehide (USA)	6	6
V Cepede Royg (PAR); M González (PAR)	0	4
Bronze-medal match
4	A Guarachi (CHI); D Seguel (CHI)	6	5	[9]
3	C Alves (BRA); L Stefani (BRA)	2	7	[11]
