= Tennis at the 2019 Pan American Games – Men's singles =

Tennis – Men's singles at the 2019 Pan American Games
- Venue: Club Lawn Tennis de la Exposición
- Dates: July 29 – August 4, 2019
- Competitors: 45 from 19 nations

Medalists
Gold medal	João Menezes	Brazil
Silver medal	Tomás Barrios	Chile
Bronze medal	Guido Andreozzi	Argentina

Men's singles
- Tennis at the 2019 Pan American Games

Events
Singles	men	women
Doubles	men	women	mixed
Qualification
- Pan American Games

The men's singles tennis event of the 2019 Pan American Games was held July 29 – August 4 at the Club Lawn Tennis de la Exposición in Lima, Peru.

João Menezes of Brazil won the gold medal, defeating Tomás Barrios of Chile in the final, 7–5, 3–6, 6–4.

Guido Andreozzi of Argentina won the bronze medal, defeating Facundo Bagnis of Argentina in the bronze-medal match, 6–4, 7–5.

== Seeds ==
1. Nicolás Jarry (CHI) (quarterfinals)
2. Guido Andreozzi (ARG) (semifinals, bronze medalist)
3. Facundo Bagnis (ARG) (semifinals)
4. Darian King (BAR) (third round)
5. Santiago Giraldo (COL) (third round)
6. Roberto Quiroz (ECU) (third round)
7. João Menezes (BRA) (champion, gold medalist)
8. José Hernández (DOM) (quarterfinals)
9. Tomás Barrios (CHI) (finalist, silver medalist)
10. Roberto Cid (DOM) (quarterfinals)
11. Alejandro Tabilo (CHI) (third round)
12. Gonzalo Escobar (ECU) (second round)
13. Michael Redlicki (USA) (third round)
14. Thiago Wild (BRA) (third round)
15. Juan Pablo Varillas (PER) (quarterfinals)
16. Alejandro González (COL) (third round)

== Draw ==
Key

- Q = Qualifier
- WC = Wild card
- LL = Lucky loser
- Alt = Alternate
- ITF = ITF entry
- PR = Protected ranking
- SR = Special ranking
- SE = Special exempt
- JE = Junior exempt
- JR = Junior Accelerator Programme entrant
- CO = College Accelerator Programme entrant
- NG = Next Gen Accelerator Program entrant
- w/o = Walkover
- r = Retired
- d = Defaulted

=== Finals ===
Quarterfinals
1	Nicolás Jarry (CHI)	5	4
7	João Menezes (BRA)	7	6
3	Facundo Bagnis (ARG)	6	6
8	José Hernández (DOM)	2	3
9	Tomás Barrios (CHI)	4	6	7^{8}
15	Juan Pablo Varillas (PER)	6	2	6^{6}
10	Roberto Cid (DOM)	1	4
2	Guido Andreozzi (ARG)	6	6

Semifinals
7	João Menezes (BRA)	4	6	6
3	Facundo Bagnis (ARG)	6	2	4
9	Tomás Barrios (CHI)	7	4	6
2	Guido Andreozzi (ARG)	5	6	2

Final (gold-medal match)
7	João Menezes (BRA)	7	3	6
9	Tomás Barrios (CHI)	5	6	4
Bronze-medal match
3	Facundo Bagnis (ARG)	4	5
2	Guido Andreozzi (ARG)	6	7

=== Top half ===
==== Section 1 ====
First round
N Álvarez (PER)	6	6
Y Pérez (CUB)	0	0
R Phillips (JAM)	3	1
F Cerúndolo (ARG)	6	6
S Williams (BAR)	0	0
F Roncadelli (URU)	6	6

Second round
1	N Jarry (CHI)	6	7^{7}
N Álvarez (PER)	2	6^{4}
A Rubio (MEX)	0	1
16	A González (COL)	6	6
12	G Escobar (ECU)	3	2
F Cerúndolo (ARG)	6	6
F Roncadelli (URU)	4	0
7	J Menezes (BRA)	6	6

Third round
1	N Jarry (CHI)	6	7^{7}
16	A González (COL)	2	6^{1}
F Cerúndolo (ARG)	6	3	4
7	J Menezes (BRA)	2	6	6

Quarterfinals
1	N Jarry (CHI)	5	4
7	J Menezes (BRA)	7	6

==== Section 2 ====
First round
M Sánchez (MEX)	4	3
W González (GUA)	6	6
K Turcios (HON)	3	6	1
F Zeballos (BOL)	6	4	6
J Maginley (ANT)	6	6
K Johnson (ESA)	4	3
J Roberts (BAH)	6^{5}	7^{8}	6
S Galdós (PER)	7^{7}	6^{6}	4

Second round
3	F Bagnis (ARG)	6	6
W González (GUA)	3	3
F Zeballos (BOL)	2	0
13	Mi Redlicki (USA)	6	6
11	A Tabilo (CHI)	6	6
J Maginley (ANT)	1	3
J Roberts (BAH)	4	2
8	J Hernández (DOM)	6	6

Third round
3	F Bagnis (ARG)	6	6
13	Mi Redlicki (USA)	4	1
11	A Tabilo (CHI)	2	6	4
8	J Hernández (DOM)	6	3	6

Quarterfinals
3	F Bagnis (ARG)	6	6
8	J Hernández (DOM)	2	3

=== Bottom half ===
==== Section 3 ====
First round
N Mejía (COL)	4	2
V Estrella (DOM)	6	6
A Alvarado (ESA)	6	6
S González (GUA)	1	4
S Riffice (USA)	6	4	7
F Llanes (URU)	1	6	5

Second round
6	R Quiroz (ECU)	7	6
V Estrella (DOM)	5	1
A Alvarado (ESA)	2	2
9	T Barrios (CHI)	6	6
15	JP Varillas (PER)	6	6
B Arias (BOL)	1	1
S Riffice (USA)	4	3
4	D King (BAR)	6	6

Third round
6	R Quiroz (ECU)	0	3
9	T Barrios (CHI)	6	6
15	JP Varillas (PER)	6	6
4	D King (BAR)	1	2

Quarterfinals
9	T Barrios (CHI)	4	6	7^{8}
15	JP Varillas (PER)	6	2	6^{6}

==== Section 4 ====
First round
O Rivera (CUB)	6	6
A Obando (HON)	4	1
H Lewis (BAR)	6	7^{7}
J Hernández (MEX)	3	6^{5}
B Newman (BAH)	6	6
L Miralles (ESA)	2	2

Second round
5	S Giraldo (COL)	6	6
O Rivera (CUB)	0	1
H Lewis (BAR)	2	3
10	R Cid (DOM)	6	6
14	T Wild (BRA)	6	6
K King (USA)	4	2
B Newman (BAH)	0	1
2	G Andreozzi (ARG)	6	6

Third round
5	S Giraldo (COL)	2	5
10	R Cid (DOM)	6	7
14	T Wild (BRA)	2	2
2	G Andreozzi (ARG)	6	6

Quarterfinals
10	R Cid (DOM)	1	4
2	G Andreozzi (ARG)	6	6
