= Tennis at the 2019 Pan American Games – Women's singles =

Tennis – Women's singles at the 2019 Pan American Games
- Venue: Club Lawn Tennis de La Exposcicion
- Dates: July 29 – August 4, 2019
- Competitors: 31 from 14 nations

Medalists
Gold medal	Nadia Podoroska	Argentina
Silver medal	Caroline Dolehide	United States
Bronze medal	Verónica Cepede Royg	Paraguay

Women's singles
- Tennis at the 2019 Pan American Games

Events
Singles	men	women
Doubles	men	women	mixed
Qualification
← 2015 ·	Pan American Games	· 2023 →

The women's singles tennis event of the 2019 Pan American Games was held from July 29 through August 4 at the Club Lawn Tennis de La Exposcicion in Lima, Peru.

Nadia Podoroska of Argentina won the gold medal, defeating Caroline Dolehide of the United States in the final, 2–6, 6–3, 7–6^{(7–4)}.

Verónica Cepede Royg of Paraguay, won the bronze medal, defeating Carolina Alves of Brazil in the bronze-medal match, 6–3, 6–4.

== Seeds ==
1. Verónica Cepede Royg (PAR) (semifinals, bronze medalist)
2. Rebecca Marino (CAN) (first round)
3. Usue Arconada (USA) (quarterfinals)
4. Caroline Dolehide (USA) (final, silver medalist)
5. Daniela Seguel (CHI) (quarterfinals)
6. Renata Zarazúa (MEX) (quarterfinals)
7. Nadia Podoroska (ARG) (champion, gold medalist)
8. Camila Osorio (COL) (first round)

== Draw ==
=== Key ===
- Q = Qualifier
- WC = Wild card
- LL = Lucky loser
- Alt = Alternate
- ITF = ITF entry
- PR = Protected ranking
- SR = Special ranking
- SE = Special exempt
- JE = Junior exempt
- JR = Junior Accelerator Programme entrant
- CO = College Accelerator Programme entrant
- NG = Next Gen Accelerator Program entrant
- w/o = Walkover
- r = Retired
- d = Defaulted

=== Finals ===
Semifinals
1	Verónica Cepede Royg (PAR)	3	4
7	Nadia Podoroska (ARG)	6	6
4	Caroline Dolehide (USA)	7^{7}	6
Carolina Alves (BRA)	6^{5}	2

Final (gold-medal match)
7	Nadia Podoroska (ARG)	2	6	7^{7}
4	Caroline Dolehide (USA)	6	3	6^{4}
Bronze-medal match
1	Verónica Cepede Royg (PAR)	6	6
Carolina Alves (BRA)	3	4

=== Top half ===
First round
D Schaefer (PER)	7	7
A James (GRN)	5	5
L Stefani (BRA)	6	6^{5}	6
G Olmos (MEX)	2	7^{7}	2
J Bui (CAN)	5	7	6
8	C Osorio (COL)	7	5	4
3	U Arconada (USA)	6	6
A Iamachkine (PER)	1	0
N Zeballos (BOL)	6	4	3
A Vagramov (CAN)	3	6	6
M Reasco (ECU)	6	6
A Weedon (GUA)	4	4
F Brito (CHI)	2	5
7	N Podoroska (ARG)	6	7

Second round
1	V Cepede Royg (PAR)	6	6
D Schaefer (PER)	2	2
L Stefani (BRA)	3	2
J Bui (CAN)	6	6
3	U Arconada (USA)	7	6
A Vagramov (CAN)	5	2
M Reasco (ECU)	3	2
7	N Podoroska (ARG)	6	6

Quarterfinals
1	V Cepede Royg (PAR)	6	6
J Bui (CAN)	4	0
3	U Arconada (USA)	4	4
7	N Podoroska (ARG)	6	6

Semifinals
1	V Cepede Royg (PAR)	3	4
7	N Podoroska (ARG)	6	6

=== Bottom half ===
First round
5	D Seguel (CHI)	6	6
M Morales (GUA)	1	0
MF Herazo (COL)	6	6
K Williford (DOM)	0	3
M Zacarías (MEX)	6	6
C Pella (ARG)	2	1
M González (PAR)	4	6	4
4	C Dolehide (USA)	6	2	6
6	R Zarazúa (MEX)	6	6
D Guzmán (PER)	1	1
E Arango (COL)	2	2
A Graham (USA)	6	6
V Bosio (ARG)	7	6
C Römer (ECU)	5	3
C Alves (BRA)	5	6	6
2	R Marino (CAN)	7	4	4

Second round
5	D Seguel (CHI)	6	6
MF Herazo (COL)	2	1
M Zacarías (MEX)	1	7^{7}	1
4	C Dolehide (USA)	6	6^{3}	6
6	R Zarazúa (MEX)	7^{8}	6
A Graham (USA)	6^{6}	4
V Bosio (ARG)	1	7^{8}	4
C Alves (BRA)	6	6^{6}	6

Quarterfinals
5	D Seguel (CHI)	5	6^{2}
4	C Dolehide (USA)	7	7^{7}
6	R Zarazúa (MEX)	2	0
C Alves (BRA)	6	6

Semifinals
4	C Dolehide (USA)	7^{7}	6
C Alves (BRA)	6^{5}	2
