= Tennis at the 2019 Pan American Games – Mixed doubles =

Tennis – Mixed doubles at the 2019 Pan American Games
- Venue: Club Lawn Tennis de la Exposición
- Dates: July 30 – August 3, 2019
- Competitors: 20 from 10 nations
- Teams: 10
- Gold medal match score: 6–1, 6–3

Medalists
Gold medal	Alexa Guarachi; Nicolás Jarry	Chile
Silver medal	Noelia Zeballos; Federico Zeballos	Bolivia
Bronze medal	Anastasia Iamachkine; Sergio Galdós	Peru

Mixed doubles
- Tennis at the 2019 Pan American Games

Events
Singles	men	women
Doubles	men	women	mixed
Qualification
- Pan American Games

The mixed doubles tennis event of the 2019 Pan American Games was held from July 30 through August 3 at the Club Lawn Tennis de la Exposición in Lima, Peru.

Alexa Guarachi and Nicolás Jarry of Chile won the gold medal, defeating Noelia Zeballos and Federico Zeballos of Bolivia in the final, 6–1, 6–3.

Anastasia Iamachkine and Sergio Galdós of Peru won the bronze medal, defeating Andrea Weedon and Wilfredo González of Guatemala in the bronze-medal match, 7–5, 6–1.

== Seeds ==
1. Alexa Guarachi (CHI) / Nicolás Jarry (CHI) (champions, gold medalists)
2. Luisa Stefani (BRA) / João Menezes (BRA) (quarterfinals)
3. Noelia Zeballos (BOL) / Federico Zeballos (BOL) (finalists, silver medalists)
4. Kelly Williford (DOM) / José Hernández (DOM) (quarterfinals)

== Draw ==
Key

- Q = Qualifier
- WC = Wild card
- LL = Lucky loser
- Alt = Alternate
- ITF = ITF entry
- PR = Protected ranking
- SR = Special ranking
- SE = Special exempt
- JE = Junior exempt
- JR = Junior Accelerator Programme entrant
- CO = College Accelerator Programme entrant
- NG = Next Gen Accelerator Program entrant
- w/o = Walkover
- r = Retired
- d = Defaulted

=== Draw ===
First round
A Graham (USA); S Riffice (USA)	3	6	[3]
C Osorio (COL); S Giraldo (COL)	6	3	[10]
V Bosio (ARG); F Cerúndolo (ARG)	3	1
A Iamachkine (PER); S Galdós (PER)	6	6

Quarterfinals
1	A Guarachi (CHI); N Jarry (CHI)	6	6
C Osorio (COL); S Giraldo (COL)	2	3
4	K Williford (DOM); J Hernández (DOM)	2	5
A Weedon (GUA); W González (GUA)	6	7
G Olmos (MEX); M Sánchez (MEX)	2	6	[5]
3	N Zeballos (BOL); F Zeballos (BOL)	6	2	[10]
A Iamachkine (PER); S Galdós (PER)	7	6
2	L Stefani (BRA); J Menezes (BRA)	5	4

Semifinals
1	A Guarachi (CHI); N Jarry (CHI)	6	6
A Weedon (GUA); W González (GUA)	1	2
3	N Zeballos (BOL); F Zeballos (BOL)	1	6	[10]
A Iamachkine (PER); S Galdós (PER)	6	4	[2]

Final (gold-medal match)
1	A Guarachi (CHI); N Jarry (CHI)	6	6
3	N Zeballos (BOL); F Zeballos (BOL)	1	3
Bronze-medal match
A Weedon (GUA); W González (GUA)	5	1
A Iamachkine (PER); S Galdós (PER)	7	6
