= Tennis at the 2019 Pan American Games =

- Tennis pictogram
- Venue: Club Lawn Tennis de La Exposición
- Dates: July 29 – August 4, 2019
- No. of events: 5 (2 men, 2 women, 1 mixed)
- Competitors: 78 from 22 nations

Tennis at the 2019 Pan American Games

Champions

Men's singles
- João Menezes (BRA)

Women's singles
- Nadia Podoroska (ARG)

Men's doubles
- Gonzalo Escobar & Roberto Quiroz (ECU)

Women's doubles
- Usue Arconada & Caroline Dolehide (USA)

Mixed doubles
- Alexa Guarachi & Nicolás Jarry (CHI)
- Pan American Games

Tennis competitions at the 2019 Pan American Games in Lima, Peru are scheduled to be held from July 29 to August 4. The competitions will take place at the Club Lawn Tennis de La Exposición.

A total of 80 athletes (48 men and 32 women) are scheduled to compete in five events: singles and doubles for each gender and a mixed doubles event.

The top two in each individual event will qualify for the 2020 Summer Olympics, if ranked in the top 300 in the world by June 8, 2020, and if their country has not passed the maximum quota.

== Competition schedule ==
The following is the competition schedule for the tennis competitions:

E	Eliminations	½	Semifinals	F	Final

Event	Date						
Event	Mon 29	Tue 30	Wed 31	Thu 1	Fri 2	Sat 3	Sun 4
Men's singles	E	E	E	E	E	½	F
Men's doubles	E	E	E	E	½	F	
Women's singles	E	E	E	E	E	½	F
Women's doubles		E			½	F	
Mixed doubles		E	E	E	½	F	

== Medal table ==
The following is the medal standings as of 3 August 2019.

* Host nation (Peru)

Rank	Nation	Gold	Silver	Bronze	Total
1	Argentina	1	1	1	3
2	Chile	1	1	0	2
2	United States	1	1	0	2
4	Brazil	1	0	1	2
5	Ecuador	1	0	0	1
6	Paraguay	0	1	1	2
7	Bolivia	0	1	0	1
8	Peru*	0	0	2	2
Totals (8 entries)		5	5	5	15

== Medalists ==
Event	Gold	Silver	Bronze
Men's singles	João Menezes; Brazil	Tomás Barrios; Chile	Guido Andreozzi; Argentina
Men's doubles	Ecuador; Gonzalo Escobar; Roberto Quiroz	Argentina; Guido Andreozzi; Facundo Bagnis	Peru; Sergio Galdós; Juan Pablo Varillas
Women's singles	Nadia Podoroska; Argentina	Caroline Dolehide; United States	Verónica Cepede Royg; Paraguay
Women's doubles	United States; Usue Arconada; Caroline Dolehide	Paraguay; Verónica Cepede Royg; Montserrat González	Brazil; Carolina Alves; Luisa Stefani
Mixed doubles	Chile; Alexa Guarachi; Nicolás Jarry	Bolivia; Noelia Zeballos; Federico Zeballos	Peru; Anastasia Iamachkine; Sergio Galdós

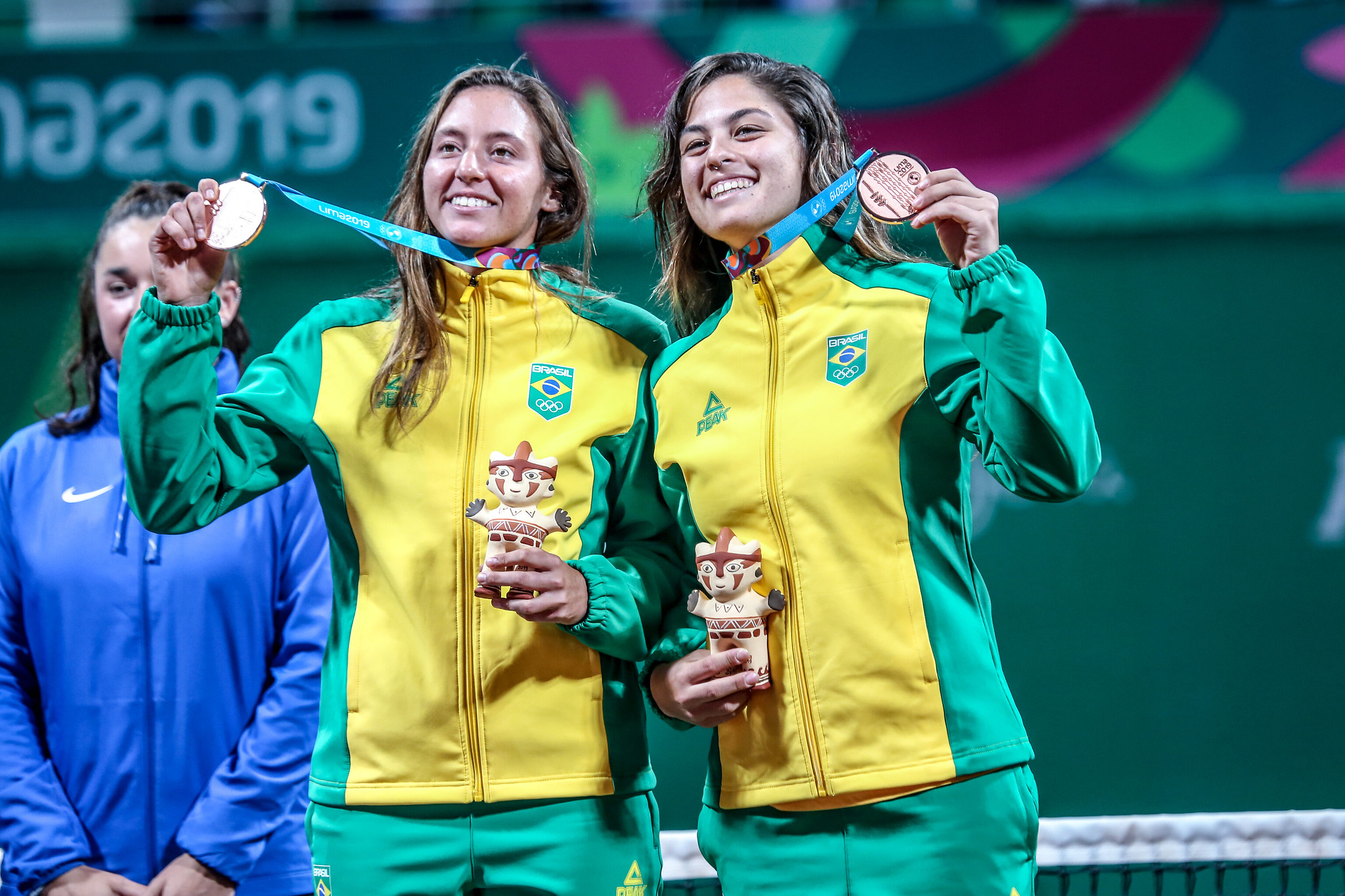
Brazilians Luisa Stefani and Carolina Meligeni Alves, woman's doubles bronze medalists

== Participating nations ==
A total of 22 countries had qualified athletes.

- Antigua and Barbuda (2)
- Argentina (6)
- Bahamas (2)
- Barbados (3)
- Bolivia (3)
- Brazil (4)
- Canada (3)
- Chile (6)
- Colombia (6)
- Cuba (2)
- Dominican Republic (4)
- Ecuador (4)
- El Salvador (3)
- Grenada (1)
- Guatemala (4)
- Honduras (2)
- Jamaica (1)
- Mexico (6)
- Paraguay (2)
- Peru (6)
- United States (6)
- Uruguay (2)

== Qualification ==
A total of 80 tennis players will qualify (48 men and 32 women). The host nation automatically qualifies the maximum team size of six athletes (three per gender). Four wild cards for men and three for women will also be awarded, with the rest of the spots being awarded using the ATP ranking and WTA ranking as of June 11, 2019. If spaces are still left over, the ITF rankings will be used.

Qualification method	Men's singles	Women's singles	Men's doubles	Women's doubles	Mixed doubles
Host country	3	3	1	1	1
2018 South American Games	2	2	—N/a	—N/a	—N/a
2018 Central American and Caribbean Games	2	2	—N/a	—N/a	—N/a
ATP and WTA rankings	37	22	20	13	13
Wild Cards	4	3	3	2	2
Total	48	32	24	16	16

== See also ==
- Wheelchair tennis at the 2019 Parapan American Games
- Tennis at the 2020 Summer Olympics
