= Dominican Republic at the 2019 Pan American Games =

- IOC code: DOM
- NOC: Dominican Republic Olympic Committee

in Lima, Peru 26 July–11 August 2019
- Competitors: 209 in 33 sports
- Flag bearer: Crismery Santana (opening)
- Medals Ranked 9th: Gold 11 Silver 12 Bronze 17 Total 40

Pan American Games appearances (overview)
- 1951; 1955; 1959; 1963; 1967; 1971; 1975; 1979; 1983; 1987; 1991; 1995; 1999; 2003; 2007; 2011; 2015; 2019; 2023

Dominican Republic competed in the 2019 Pan American Games in Lima, Peru from July 26 to August 11, 2019.

On July 2, 2019, weightlifter Crismery Santana was named as the country's flag bearer during the opening ceremony.

The Dominican Republic team consisted of 209 athletes.

== Medalists ==
The following Dominican Republic competitors won medals at the games.

Medal	Name	Sport	Event	Date
Gold	Beatriz Pirón	Weightlifting	Women's 49 kg	July 27
Gold	Robert Pigozzi	Water skiing	Men's slalom	July 29
Gold	Cándida Arias; Brenda Castillo; Bethania de la Cruz; Camil Domínguez; Lisvel Eve; Gaila González; Niverka Marte; Brayelin Martínez; Jineiry Martínez; Yonkaira Peña; Prisilla Rivera; Annerys Vargas	Volleyball	Women's tournament	August 11
Silver	Bernardo Pie	Taekwondo	Men's 68 kg	July 28
Silver	Zacarias Bonnat	Weightlifting	Men's 80 kg	July 28
Silver	Crismery Santana	Weightlifting	Women's +87 kg	July 30
Silver	Verónica Saladín	Weightlifting	Women's 87 kg	July 30
Silver	Jiaji Wu	Table tennis	Men's singles	August 7
Silver	Juan Rubelín Ramírez	Wrestling	Men's Freestyle 57 kg	August 9
Silver	Álbaro Rudesindo	Wrestling	Men's Freestyle 65 kg	August 9
Bronze	Astrid Valiente; Aumi Guerra	Bowling	Women's doubles	July 27
Bronze	Santa Cotes	Weightlifting	Women's 49 kg	July 27
Bronze	Julio Cedeño	Weightlifting	Men's 73 kg	July 28
Bronze	Carolay Hernandez; Sugeiry Monsac; Giocelis Reynoso; Nelsy Sentil	Basketball	Women's 3x3 tournament	July 29
Bronze	Reyson Beato; Adonis Nuñez; Bryan Piantini; Henry Valdez	Basketball	Men's 3x3 tournament	July 29
Bronze	Moisés Hernández	Taekwondo	Men's 80 kg	July 29
Bronze	Emil Santos; Jiaji Wu	Table tennis	Men's doubles	August 5
Bronze	Leo Santana	Wrestling	Men's Greco-Roman 130 kg	August 8
Bronze	Luis Miguel Pérez	Wrestling	Men's Freestyle 97 kg	August 10

Medals by sport
Sport	1st place, gold medalist(s)	2nd place, silver medalist(s)	3rd place, bronze medalist(s)	Total
Weightlifting	1	3	2	6
Volleyball	1	0	0	1
Water skiing	1	0	0	1
Wrestling	0	2	2	4
Table tennis	0	1	1	2
Taekwondo	0	1	1	2
Basketball	0	0	2	2
Bowling	0	0	1	1
Total	3	7	9	19

Medals by day
Day	Date	1st place, gold medalist(s)	2nd place, silver medalist(s)	3rd place, bronze medalist(s)	Total
1	July 27	1	0	2	3
2	July 28	0	2	1	3
3	July 29	1	0	3	4
4	July 30	0	2	0	2
5	July 31	0	0	0	0
6	August 1	0	0	0	0
7	August 2	0	0	0	0
8	August 3	0	0	0	0
9	August 4	0	0	0	0
10	August 5	0	0	1	1
11	August 6	0	0	0	0
12	August 7	0	1	0	1
13	August 8	0	0	1	1
14	August 9	0	2	0	2
15	August 10	0	0	1	1
16	August 11	1	0	0	1
Total		3	7	9	19

Medals by gender
Gender	1st place, gold medalist(s)	2nd place, silver medalist(s)	3rd place, bronze medalist(s)	Total
Female	2	2	3	7
Male	1	7	4	12
Mixed	0	0	0	0
Total	3	7	9	19

Multiple medalists
Name	Sport	1st place, gold medalist(s)	2nd place, silver medalist(s)	3rd place, bronze medalist(s)	Total
		0	0	0	0

== Competitors ==
The following is the list of number of competitors (per gender) participating at the games per sport/discipline.

Sport	Men	Women	Total
Archery	0	1	1
Badminton	3	3	6
Baseball	24	0	24
Basketball	16	4	20
Bodybuilding	1	0	1
Boxing	9	2	11
Bowling	2	2	4
Canoeing	3	0	3
Cycling	3	1	4
Diving	2	0	2
Equestrian	1	3	4
Fencing	0	4	4
Golf	2	1	3
Gymnastics	0	1	1
Handball	0	14	14
Judo	6	3	9
Karate	3	7	10
Modern pentathlon	2	2	4
Racquetball	2	2	4
Rowing	1	0	1
Sailing	1	0	1
Shooting	5	1	6
Table tennis	3	3	6
Taekwondo	4	3	7
Tennis	3	1	4
Triathlon	0	1	1
Volleyball	2	12	14
Water skiing	1	1	2
Weightlifting	3	4	7
Wrestling	10	0	10
Total	112	76	188

== Archery ==
Women

Athlete	Event	Ranking round		Round of 32	Round of 16	Quarterfinal	Semifinal	Final / BM	
Athlete	Event	Score	Rank	Opposition Result	Opposition Result	Opposition Result	Opposition Result	Opposition Result	Rank
Stefany Jerez	Individual recurve	612	17	Chénier (CAN); L 2–6	did not advance				

== Badminton ==
The Dominican Republic qualified a team of six badminton athletes (three per gender).

Singles

Athlete	Event	Round of 64	Round of 32	Round of 16	Quarterfinals	Semifinals	Final	Rank
Athlete	Event	Opposition Result	Opposition Result	Opposition Result	Opposition Result	Opposition Result	Opposition Result	Rank
William Cabrera	Men's	Bye	Ho-shue (CAN); L 0–2 (5–21, 9–21)	Did not advance				
Nelson Javier	Men's	Guevara (PER); L 0–2 (15–21, 19–21)	Did not advance					
César Brito	Men's	Cordón (GUA); L 0–2 (8–21, 18–21)	Bye	Did not advance				
Bermary Muñoz	Women's	Bye	Li (CAN); L 0–2 (17–21, 12–21)	Did not advance				
Clarisa Pie	Women's	Bye	Castillo (PER); L 0–2 (10–21, 2–21)	Did not advance				
Nairoby Jiménez	Women's	Bye	Paiz (GUA); W 2–0 (21–13, 21–16)	Honderich (CAN); L 0–2 (11–21, 10–21)	Did not advance			

Doubles

Athlete	Event	Round of 32	Round of 16	Quarterfinals	Semifinals	Final	Rank
Athlete	Event	Opposition Result	Opposition Result	Opposition Result	Opposition Result	Opposition Result	Rank
William Cabrera; Nelson Javier	Men's	Guerrero / Palacio (CUB); L 0–2 (14–21, 15–21)	Did not advance				
Bermary Muñoz; Nairoby Jiménez	Women's	Lima / Lima (PER); L 1–2 (13–21, 23–21, 18–21)	Did not advance				
Nelson Javier; Nairoby Jiménez	Mixed	Araya / Naranjo (CHI); W 2–0 (21–19, 21–15)	Thorpe / Williams (BAR); W 2–0 (21–16, 21–12)	Farias / Lima (BRA); L 0–2 (8–21, 19–21)	Did not advance		

== Baseball ==
The Dominican Republic qualified a men's team of 24 athletes by finishing in the top four at the 2019 Pan American Games Qualifier in Brazil.

Group A

	GP	W	L	RS	RA	DIFF
Puerto Rico	3	3	0	13	5	+8
Nicaragua	3	2	1	17	9	+8
Dominican Republic	3	1	2	13	9	+4
Peru	3	0	3	4	24	−14

Qualified for the Super round

July 29; 19:05	Dominican Republic	10–3	Peru	Baseball Stadium, Lima; Attendance: 2,798
July 29; 19:05		Boxscore		Baseball Stadium, Lima; Attendance: 2,798

July 31; 10:05	Nicaragua	4–2	Dominican Republic	Baseball Stadium, Lima; Attendance: 577
July 31; 10:05		Boxscore		Baseball Stadium, Lima; Attendance: 577

August 1; 15:05	Dominican Republic	1–2 (F/10)	Puerto Rico	Baseball Stadium, Lima; Attendance: 1,780
August 1; 15:05		Boxscore		Baseball Stadium, Lima; Attendance: 1,780

Fifth place match

August 3; 10:05	Dominican Republic	10–9 (F/10)	Cuba	Baseball Stadium, Lima; Attendance: 2,415
August 3; 10:05		Boxscore		Baseball Stadium, Lima; Attendance: 2,415

== Basketball ==
=== 5 × 5 ===
Summary

Team	Event	Preliminary round				Semifinal	Final / BM / Pl.	
Team	Event	Opposition Result	Opposition Result	Opposition Result	Rank	Opposition Result	Opposition Result	Rank
Dominican Republic	Men's tournament	Mexico; W 65-61	Argentina; L 97-102	Uruguay; W 83-57	2 Q	Puerto Rico; L 63-65	United States; L 83-92	4

==== Men's tournament ====
Preliminary round

Team	Pld	W	L	PF	PA	PD	Pts	Qualification
Argentina	3	2	1	268	234	+34	5	Qualified for the Semifinals
Dominican Republic	3	2	1	245	220	+25	5	Qualified for the Semifinals
Uruguay	3	1	2	194	246	−52	4	
Mexico	3	1	2	194	201	−7	4	

31 July 2019
21:00

Report

Mexico	61–65 (OT)	Dominican Republic
Scoring by quarter: 6–20, 13–13, 22–14, 14–8, Overtime: 6–10
Pts: Estrada 18; Rebs: Gutiérrez 9 Asts: Estrada 5		Pts: Rojas, Suero 13; Rebs: Santos, Vargas 6 Asts: Four players 1

Coliseo Eduardo Dibos, Lima
Referees: Jorge Vázquez (PUR)

1 August 2019
13:30

Report

Dominican Republic	97–102 (OT)	Argentina
Scoring by quarter: 18–21, 19–22, 18–23, 32–21, Overtime: 10–15
Pts: De León 21; Rebs: Montero 8 Asts: Montero 3		Pts: Deck 24; Rebs: Campazzo, Deck 6 Asts: Campazzo 7

Coliseo Eduardo Dibos, Lima
Referees: Jorge Vázquez (PUR)

2 August 2019
10:30

Report

Uruguay	57–83	Dominican Republic
Scoring by quarter: 19–15, 12–20, 12–19, 14–29
Pts: Four players 9 Rebs: Wachsmann 13; Asts: Parodi 5		Pts: Figueroa 16; Rebs: Rojas, Vargas 5 Asts: Solano 9

Coliseo Eduardo Dibos, Lima
Referees: Jorge Vazquez (PUR)

Semifinal

3 August 2019
18:00

Report

Puerto Rico	65–63	Dominican Republic
Scoring by quarter: 13–18, 21–8, 15–14, 16–23
Pts: Sosa 13; Rebs: Andujar, Reese 7 Asts: Soto 3		Pts: Suero, Vargas 15; Rebs: Rojas, Vargas 7 Asts: Montero 2

Coliseo Eduardo Dibos, Lima
Referees: Leandro Lezcano (ARG)

Bronze medal match

4 August 2019
18:00

Report

Dominican Republic	83–92	United States
Scoring by quarter: 20–20, 18–16, 27–24, 18–32
Pts: Solano 26; Rebs: Montero 9 Asts: De León 4		Pts: Diallo 23; Rebs: Groselle 10; Asts: Diallo 3

Coliseo Eduardo Dibos, Lima
Referees: Leandro Lezcano (ARG)

=== 3 × 3 ===
Summary

Team	Event	Preliminary round						Semifinal	Final / BM / Pl.	
Team	Event	Opposition Result	Opposition Result	Opposition Result	Opposition Result	Opposition Result	Rank	Opposition Result	Opposition Result	Rank
Dominican Republic men	Men's tournament	Brazil; L 13-22	Puerto Rico; L 12-21	Argentina; W 21-16	Venezuela; W 22-18	United States; L 13-21	4 Q	Puerto Rico; L 8-21	Brazil; W 19-17	3rd place, bronze medalist(s)
Dominican Republic women	Women's tournament	Brazil; W 16-14	Argentina; L 10-12	Dominican Republic; W 18-13	Uruguay; W 17-13	United States; L 7-21	3Q	Argentina; L 8-21	Brazil; W 20-15	3rd place, bronze medalist(s)

==== Men's tournament ====
Preliminary round

Pos	Team	Pld	W	L	PF	PA	PD	Qualification
1	Puerto Rico	5	5	0	104	70	+34	Semifinals
2	Brazil	5	3	2	101	91	+10	Semifinals
3	United States	5	2	3	99	89	+10	Semifinals
4	Dominican Republic	5	2	3	81	98	−17	Semifinals
5	Venezuela	5	2	3	85	104	−19	Fifth place match
6	Argentina	5	1	4	86	104	−18	Fifth place match

Source: Report
Rules for classification: 1) Wins; 2) Head-to-head record; 3) Points scored.

27 July 2019
16:30

Report

Brazil	22–13	Dominican Republic
Pts: Weihermann 11		Pts: Beato 10

Coliseo Eduardo Dibos
Referees: Sonia Maldonado (PUR) / Glenn Tuitt (USA)

27 July 2019
19:30

Report

Dominican Republic	12–21	Puerto Rico
Pts: Beato 8		Pts: Fernández 9

Coliseo Eduardo Dibos
Referees: Kayla Herdman (CAN) / Glenn Tuitt (USA)

28 July 2019
15:30

Report

Argentina	16–21	Dominican Republic
Pts: Massarelli 8		Pts: Núñez 11

Coliseo Eduardo Dibos
Referees: Ángel Martínez (PUR) / Carolina Zachi (BRA)

28 July 2019
17:30

Report

Venezuela	18–22	Dominican Republic
Pts: Sifontes, Carrera 7		Pts: Núñez 17

Coliseo Eduardo Dibos
Referees: Gonzalo Paz (URU) / Glenn Tuitt (USA)

28 July 2019
21:30

Report

Dominican Republic	13–21	United States
Pts: Beato 7		Pts: Jones 8

Coliseo Eduardo Dibos
Referees: Kayla Herdman (CAN) / Ángel Martínez (PUR)

Semifinal

29 July 2019
10:00

Report

Puerto Rico	21–8	Dominican Republic
Pts: Fernández 11		Pts: Piantini 4

Coliseo Eduardo Dibos
Referees: Kayla Herdman (CAN) / Glenn Tuitt (USA)

Bronze medal match

29 July 2019
12:30

Report

Dominican Republic	19–17	Brazil
Pts: Piantini, Núñez 7		Pts: Froehlich 8

Coliseo Eduardo Dibos
Referees: Ángel Martínez (PUR) / Glenn Tuitt (USA)

==== Women's tournament ====
Preliminary round

Pos	Team	Pld	W	L	PF	PA	PD	Qualification
1	United States	5	5	0	102	48	+54	Semifinals
2	Argentina	5	4	1	76	68	+8	Semifinals
3	Dominican Republic	5	3	2	68	73	−5	Semifinals
4	Brazil	5	2	3	76	89	−13	Semifinals
5	Venezuela	5	1	4	72	80	−8	Fifth place match
6	Uruguay	5	0	5	55	91	−36	Fifth place match

Source: Lima 2019
Rules for classification: 1) Wins; 2) Head-to-head record; 3) Points scored.

27 July 2019
14:30

Report

Brazil	14–16	Dominican Republic
Pts: Mariano, Mineiro 5		Pts: Hernández 9

Coliseo Eduardo Dibos
Referees: Sonia Maldonado / Ángel Martínez (PUR)

27 July 2019
17:30

Report

Dominican Republic	10–12	Argentina
Pts: Monsac 5		Pts: Boquete 8

Coliseo Eduardo Dibos
Referees: Kayla Herdman (CAN) / Carolina Zachi (BRA)

27 July 2019
20:30

Report

Venezuela	13–18	Dominican Republic
Pts: Wallen 7		Pts: Monsac, Hernández 6

Coliseo Eduardo Dibos
Referees: Sonia Maldonado (PUR) / Carolina Zachi (BRA)

28 July 2019
16:00

Report

Dominican Republic	17–13	Uruguay
Pts: Reynoso 9		Pts: Dolinsky 6

Coliseo Eduardo Dibos
Referees: Sonia Maldonado (PUR) / Glenn Tuitt (USA)

28 July 2019
19:00

Report

United States	21–7	Dominican Republic
Pts: Hebard, Willams 7		Pts: Monsac 5

Coliseo Eduardo Dibos
Referees: Carolina Zachi (BRA) / Sonia Maldonado (PUR)

Semifinal

29 July 2019
9:30

Report

Argentina	21–8	Dominican Republic
Pts: Gretter 8		Pts: Reynoso 4

Coliseo Eduardo Dibos
Referees: Gonzalo Paz (URU) / Carolina Zachi (BRA)

Bronze medal match

29 July 2019
12:00

Report

Brazil	15–20	Dominican Republic
Pts: three players 4		Pts: Reynoso 8

Coliseo Eduardo Dibos
Referees: Kayla Herdman (CAN) / Sonia Maldonado (PUR)

== Bodybuilding ==
The Dominican Republic qualified a male bodybuilder.

Atleta	Evento	Pré-julgamento		Final	
Atleta	Evento	Pontos	Posição	Pontos	Posição
Michael Ventura	Men's class bodybuilding	—N/a		did not advance	

- There were no results in the pre-judging stage, with only the top six advancing.

== Bowling ==
Athlete	Event	Qualification / Final														Round robin											Semifinal	Final	
Athlete	Event	Block 1						Block 2						Total	Rank	Round robin											Semifinal	Final	
Athlete	Event	1	2	3	4	5	6	7	8	9	10	11	12	Total	Rank	1	2	3	4	5	6	7	8	Total	Grand total	Rank	Opposition Result	Opposition Result	Rank
Alex Prats	Men's singles	280	187	249	157	265	219	215	227	228	277	198	200	2702	8 Q	226	173	169	182	158	236	195	210	1569	4271	8	did not advance		
Rolando Sebelen	Men's singles	255	196	231	179	228	236	226	245	203	235	189	225	2648	11	Did not advance													
Alex Prats; Rolando Sebelen	Men's doubles	446	424	432	410	376	442	443	435	450	326	399	457	5040	11	—N/a													
Aumi Guerra	Women's singles	152	190	193	202	226	257	194	163	248	204	278	222	2529	8 Q	192	172	195	204	196	160	196	195	1570	4099	7	did not advance		
Astrid Valiente	Women's singles	257	201	212	210	226	194	227	151	214	202	191	211	2496	9	Did not advance													
Aumi Guerra; Astrid Valiente	Women's doubles	427	418	466	410	449	430	370	312	403	507	414	408	5014	3rd place, bronze medalist(s)	—N/a													

== Boxing ==
The Dominican Republic qualified 11 boxers (nine men and two women).

Men

Athlete	Event	Preliminaries	Quarterfinal	Semifinal	Final	
Athlete	Event	Opposition Result	Opposition Result	Opposition Result	Opposition Result	Rank
Mario Lavegar	–49 kg	Bye	Martínez (COL); L 0–5	Did not advance		
Rodrigo Marte	–52 kg	Bye	Tapia (CHI); W 5–0	Quiroga (ARG); W 5–0	Veitía (CUB); W 4–1	1st place, gold medalist(s)
Alexy De La Cruz	–56 kg	Bye	Caicedo (ECU); W 5–0	Caballero (CUB); L 1–4	Did not advance	3rd place, bronze medalist(s)
Leonel de los Santos	–60 kg	Bye	Carrington (USA); W 5–0	Cabrera (VEN); W WO	Álvarez (CUB); L 2–3	2nd place, silver medalist(s)
Hendri Cedeño	–64 kg	Ferrín (COL); W 3–2	Cruz (CUB); L 0–5	Did not advance		
Rohan Polanco	–69 kg	Bye	Thomas (TTO); W 5–0	Maestre (VEN); W 5–0	Iglesias (CUB); L 2–3	2nd place, silver medalist(s)
Euri Cedeno	–75 kg	Bye	López (CUB); L 1–4	Did not advance		
Euri Cedeno	–81 kg	Bye	Korbaj (VEN); L RSC	Did not advance		
Joaquín Berroa	–91 kg	Bye	Teixeira (BRA); L 0–5	Did not advance		

Women

Athlete	Event	Quarterfinal	Semifinal	Final	
Athlete	Event	Opposition Result	Opposition Result	Opposition Result	Rank
Miguelina Hernández	–51 kg	Esquivel (NCA); W 4–1	Valencia (COL); L 0–5	Did not advance	3rd place, bronze medalist(s)
Maria Moronta	–69 kg	Calderón (COL); W 5–0	Jones (USA); L 1–4	Did not advance	3rd place, bronze medalist(s)

== Canoeing ==
=== Sprint ===
Men

Athlete	Event	Heat		Semifinal		Final	
Athlete	Event	Time	Rank	Time	Rank	Time	Rank
Ariel Jimenez	C-1 1000 m	4.39.213	5 SF	4:43.509	6	did not advance	
Cristian Guerrero	K-1 200 m	38.219	5 SF	37.703	2 QF	39.934	8
Cristian Guerrero	K-1 1000 m	3.43.312	4 SF	3:45.145	3	did not advance	
Rafael Feliz; Cristian Guerrero	K-2 1000 m	3:33.014	3 SF	3:31.332	4 QF	3:27.024	7

Qualification legend: QF – Qualify to final; SF – Qualify to semifinal

== Cycling ==
=== Road cycling ===
Athlete	Event	Time	Rank
Wellinton Capellán	Men's road race	4:09:21	30
Geovanny García	Men's road race	4:09:26	31
Junior Aguilera	Men's road race	DNF	
Juana Veras	Women's road race	2:32:03	35

=== Track cycling ===
Madison

Athlete	Event	Points	Rank
Wellinton Capellán; Geovanny García	Men's	DNF	

Omnium

Athlete	Event	Scratch race		Tempo race		Elimination race		Points race		Total	
Athlete	Event	Rank	Points	Points	Rank	Rank	Points	Points	Rank	Points	Rank
Junior Aguilera	Men's	14	14	16	13	14	14	2	DNF	46	12
Juana Veras	Women's	17	8	8	17	16	10	0	DNF	26	17

== Diving ==
Men

Athlete	Event	Preliminary		Final	
Athlete	Event	Points	Rank	Points	Rank
Frandiel Gómez	Men's 1m Springboard	261.95	15	Did not advance	
José Ruvalcaba	Men's 3m Springboard	368.40	8 Q	405.80	8
Frandiel Gómez	Men's 3m Springboard	314.40	19	Did not advance	
José Ruvalcaba	Men's 10m Platform	375.85	10 Q	420.00	7
José Ruvalcaba; Frandiel Gómez	Men's 3m Synchro	—N/a		359.82	6
José Ruvalcaba; Frandiel Gómez	Men's 10m Synchro Platform	—N/a		339.66	6

== Equestrian ==
Dominican Republic qualified four equestrians.

=== Dressage ===
Athlete	Horse	Event	Qualification						Grand Prix Freestyle / Intermediate I Freestyle	
Athlete	Horse	Event	Grand Prix / Prix St. Georges		Grand Prix Special / Intermediate I		Total		Grand Prix Freestyle / Intermediate I Freestyle	
Athlete	Horse	Event	Score	Rank	Score	Rank	Score	Rank	Score	Rank
Yvonne Losos de Muñiz	Aquamarijn	Individual	70.370	7	69.872	8	140.242	8 Q	75.430	4

=== Jumping ===
Athlete	Horse	Event	Qualification								Final					
Athlete	Horse	Event	Round 1		Round 2		Round 3		Total		Round A		Round B		Total	
Athlete	Horse	Event	Faults	Rank	Faults	Rank	Faults	Rank	Faults	Rank	Faults	Rank	Faults	Rank	Faults	Rank
María Brugal	Diablo VII	Individual	11.07	34	12	27	10	27	33.07	29 Q	20	28	Did not advance		20	28
Maria de la Torre	Elexo	Individual	23.24	47	35	44	26	42	84.24	44	did not advance					
Hector Florentino	Carnaval	Individual	5.72	21	9	25	9	23	23.72	23 Q	4	5	6	17	10	11
María Brugal; Maria de la Torre; Hector Florentino	As above	Team	40.03	9	56	9	45	7	141.03	9	—N/a					

== Fencing ==
The Dominican Republic qualified a team of 4 female fencers.

Women

Athlete	Event	Pool Round		Round of 16	Quarterfinals	Semifinals	Final / BM	
Athlete	Event	Victories	Seed	Opposition Score	Opposition Score	Opposition Score	Opposition Score	Rank
Violeta Ramírez	Individual épée	1	17	Did not advance				
Heyddys Ysabel	Individual sabre	4	5 Q	Tablada (CUB); L 11-15	Did not advance			
Rossy Félix	Individual sabre	1	15	Did not advance				
Heyddys Ysabel; Melody Martínez; Rossy Félix	Team sabre	—N/a			Venezuela; W 45-44	Canada; W 45-42	United States; L 31-45	2nd place, silver medalist(s)

== Golf ==
The Dominican Republic qualified a full team of four golfers (two men and two women).

Athlete	Event	Round 1	Round 2	Round 3	Round 4	Total		
Athlete	Event	Score	Score	Score	Score	Score	Par	Rank
Guillermo Pumarol	Men's individual	73	69	69	68	279	−5	14
Juan José Guerra	Men's individual	72	70	72	72	286	+2	21
Rachel Kuehn	Women's individual	73	71	75	74	293	+9	14
Guillermo Pumarol; Juan José Guerra; Rachel Kuehn	Mixed team	145	140	144	142	571	+3	13

== Gymnastics ==
=== Trampoline ===
The Dominican Republic qualified a one female trampolinist.

== Handball ==
Summary

Team	Event	Group stage				Semifinal	Final / BM	
Team	Event	Opposition Result	Opposition Result	Opposition Result	Rank	Opposition Result	Opposition Result	Rank
Dominican Republic women	Women's tournament	Peru; W 46–16	United States; L 22–26	Argentina; L 17–27	3	5th-8th place classification Canada; W 24–23	Fifth place match Puerto Rico; W 26–24	5

=== Women's tournament ===
Pos	Team	Pld	W	D	L	GF	GA	GD	Pts	Qualification
1	Argentina	3	3	0	0	105	39	+66	6	Semifinals
2	United States	3	2	0	1	70	59	+11	4	Semifinals
3	Dominican Republic	3	1	0	2	85	69	+16	2	5–8th place semifinals
4	Peru (H)	3	0	0	3	34	127	−93	0	5–8th place semifinals

Source: Lima 2019
Rules for classification: 1) points; 2) head-to-head points; 3) head-to-head goal difference; 4) head-to-head goals scored; 5) goal difference; 6) goals scored; 7) draw.
(H) Hosts

24 July 2019; 15:30	Dominican Republic	46−16	Peru	Villa Deportiva Nacional; Referees: Pineda, Estrada (COL)
24 July 2019; 15:30	Andino 13	(22−7)	Cruz 8	Villa Deportiva Nacional; Referees: Pineda, Estrada (COL)
24 July 2019; 15:30	1× (yellow card) 5× (suspension)	Report	1× (yellow card) 7× (suspension) 1× (red card)	Villa Deportiva Nacional; Referees: Pineda, Estrada (COL)

25 July 2019; 13:00	United States	26−22	Dominican Republic	Villa Deportiva Nacional; Referees: Pinto, Menezes (BRA)
25 July 2019; 13:00	Rhoads, Taylor, 7	(11−10)	three players 4	Villa Deportiva Nacional; Referees: Pinto, Menezes (BRA)
25 July 2019; 13:00	2× (yellow card) 4× (suspension)	Report	3× (yellow card) 5× (suspension)	Villa Deportiva Nacional; Referees: Pinto, Menezes (BRA)

27 July 2019; 20:30	Argentina	27–17	Dominican Republic	Villa Deportiva Nacional; Referees: Pinto, Menezes (BRA)
27 July 2019; 20:30	Pizzo 6	(13–6)	Cabrera 4	Villa Deportiva Nacional; Referees: Pinto, Menezes (BRA)
27 July 2019; 20:30	1× (yellow card) 6× (suspension)	Report	1× (yellow card) 8× (suspension) 1× (red card)	Villa Deportiva Nacional; Referees: Pinto, Menezes (BRA)

5th-8th place classification

29 July 2019; 10:00	Dominican Republic	24–23	Canada	Villa Deportiva Nacional; Referees: Sosa, Lemes (URU)
29 July 2019; 10:00	Brito, Lorenzo 5	(9–14)	Benhacine 8	Villa Deportiva Nacional; Referees: Sosa, Lemes (URU)
29 July 2019; 10:00	2× (yellow card) 4× (suspension) 1× (red card)	Report	2× (yellow card) 3× (suspension)	Villa Deportiva Nacional; Referees: Sosa, Lemes (URU)

Fifth place match

30 July 2019; 12:00	Dominican Republic	26–24	Puerto Rico	Villa Deportiva Nacional; Referees: Zuñiga, Reyes (CUB)
30 July 2019; 12:00	Nova 6	(13–14)	four players 4	Villa Deportiva Nacional; Referees: Zuñiga, Reyes (CUB)
30 July 2019; 12:00	3× (yellow card) 2× (suspension)	Report	2× (yellow card) 1× (suspension) 1× (red card)	Villa Deportiva Nacional; Referees: Zuñiga, Reyes (CUB)

== Judo ==
Men

Athlete	Event	Round of 16	Quarterfinals	Semifinals	Repechage	Final / BM	
Athlete	Event	Opposition Result	Opposition Result	Opposition Result	Opposition Result	Opposition Result	Rank
Elmert Ramírez	−60 kg	Bye	D Calle (PER); L 00S3–10S2	Did not advance	J Futtinico (COL); W 10S2–00S3	R Almenares (CUB); L 00S2–10	5
Wander Mateo	−66 kg	Bye	J Postigos (PER); W 10–00S1	O Solís (CUB); W 01S1–00	Bye	D Cargnin (BRA); W 01S2–00S1	1st place, gold medalist(s)
Medickson del Orbe	−81 kg	Bye	S Ayala (MEX); W 01S1–00S2	J Martínez (CUB); W 01S1–00	—N/a	E Yudy (BRA); L 00–10	2nd place, silver medalist(s)
Robert Florentino	−90 kg	Bye	Y Galarreta (PER); W 10–00S3	F Balanta (COL); L 00–10S2	—N/a	M Elnahas (CAN); L 00–10	5
Lewis Medina	−100 kg	Bye	J Angulo (ECU); L 01–10	Did not advance	A Esquivel (MEX); W 10–00	L Cárdona (CUB); W 11S2–01S3	3rd place, bronze medalist(s)
José Nova	+100 kg	M Deschenes (CAN); W 10S1–00	A Granda (CUB); L 00S2–10S2	Did not advance	F Solís (CHI); L 00S2–01S1	Did not advance	7

Women

Athlete	Event	Round of 16	Quarterfinals	Semifinals	Repechage	Final / BM	
Athlete	Event	Opposition Result	Opposition Result	Opposition Result	Opposition Result	Opposition Result	Rank
Estefania Soriano	−48 kg	Bye	L Álvarez (COL); W 01S1–00S2	M Dee Vargas (CHI); W 10–00S1	—N/a	V Godinez (CUB); W 01S2–00S2	1st place, gold medalist(s)
Diana de Jesús	−52 kg	Bye	L Pimenta (BRA); L 00S1–10	Did not advance	M Besson (CAN); W 01S1–00S1	N Acosta (CUB); L 00S2–01S1	5
Ana Rosa	−57 kg	Bye	K Arango (PER); W 10S1–00S1	M Roper (PAN); W 10S2–00S1	—N/a	R Silva (BRA); L 00–11	(gold) ^{[a]}

- ^{57 kg} Rafaela Silva, of Brazil, was stripped of her gold medal for doping violation.

== Karate ==
Kumite (sparring)

Athlete	Event	Round robin				Semifinal	Final	
Athlete	Event	Opposition Result	Opposition Result	Opposition Result	Rank	Opposition Result	Opposition Result	Rank
Deivis Ferreras	Men's –67 kg	Figueira (BRA); L 0-6	Rodríguez (MEX); W 1-0	Lindelauf (ARU); W 7-1	2 Q	Delgado (VEN); L 1-1	Did not advance	3rd place, bronze medalist(s)
Anderson Soriano	Men's –75 kg	Charpentier (CHI); W 6-2	Ortuño (VEN); W 6-3	Maldonado (GUA); L 0-3	2 Q	Scott (USA); L 0-4	Did not advance	3rd place, bronze medalist(s)
Anel Castillo	Men's +84 kg	Gaysinsky (CAN); L 0-5	Pérez (ARG); L 3-4	Irr (USA); L 0-1	4	Did not advance		
Ana Villanueva	Women's –50 kg	Hernández (MEX); L 2-2	González (GUA); L 0-1	Servin (PAR); W 4-0	3	Did not advance		
Karina Medina	Women's –61 kg	Jumaa (CAN); D 0-0	Hill (USA); W 1-0	Caballero (MEX); W 1-1	1 Q	Claudymar Sequera Sequera (VEN); L 0-5	Did not advance	3rd place, bronze medalist(s)
Tanya Rodríguez	Women's –68 kg	Li (CHI); L 2-4	Gabriela López López (PER); W 6-1	Martínez (CHI); W 3-0	1 Q	Mosquera (COL); W 3-3	Li (CHI); W 4-1	1st place, gold medalist(s)
Pamela Ogando	Women's +68 kg	—N/a	Aco (PER); W 3-2	Quintal (MEX); W 4-3	1 Q	Lingl (USA); W 5-3	Molina (VEN); W 6-2	1st place, gold medalist(s)

Kata (forms)

Athlete	Event	Pool round 1		Pool round 2		Final / BM	
Athlete	Event	Score	Rank	Score	Rank	Opposition Result	Rank
Maria Dimitrova	Women's individual	25.00	1 Q	25.22	1 Q	Kokumai (USA); L 0.00-25.82	2nd place, silver medalist(s)
Maria Dimitrova; Franchel Oviedo; Sasha Rodríguez	Women's team	24.22	1 Q	—N/a		Mexico; W 24.80-24.18	1st place, gold medalist(s)

== Modern pentathlon ==
The Dominican Republic qualified four modern pentathletes (two men and two women).

Athlete	Event	Fencing (Épée one touch)			Swimming (200 m freestyle)			Riding (Show jumping)			Shooting / Running (10 m laser pistol / 3000 m cross-country)			Total	
Athlete	Event	V – D	Rank	MP points	Time	Rank	MP points	Penalties	Rank	MP points	Time	Rank	MP points	MP points	Rank
Gabriel Bido	Men's individual	9-22	25	159	2:17.79	23	275	EL		0	11:17.00	8	623	1057	27
Brayan Almonte	Men's individual	8-23	28	153	2:45.41	32	220	EL		0	12:17.00	23	563	936	30
Brayan Almonte; Gabriel Bido	Men's relay	13-13	8	212	2:13.36	11	284	39	4	261	11:15.00	6	625	1382	8
Katherine Espinosa	Women's individual	13-18	20	187	2:29.15	16	252	DNS		0	15:16.00	384	24	823	25
Cecilia Karina Hernández	Women's individual	14-17	19	194	2:31.70	20	247	EL		0	16:45.00	295	28	736	27
Cecilia Karina Hernández; Katherine Espinosa	Women's relay	14-26	9	180	2:19.61	7	271	EL		0	DNF				
Gabriel Bido; Cecilia Karina Hernández	Mixed relay	26-22	6	208	2:09.05	9	292	17	4	283	12:40.00	9	540	1323	8

== Racquetball ==
The Dominican Republic qualified four racquetball athletes (two men and two women).

Men

Athlete	Event	Qualifying Round robin				Round of 16	Quarterfinals	Semifinals	Final	Rank
Athlete	Event	Match 1	Match 2	Match 3	Rank	Opposition Result	Opposition Result	Opposition Result	Opposition Result	Rank
Ramón de León	Singles	(Mexico) Rodrigo Montoya; L 0–2	(Cuba) Maykel Moyet; W 2–1	(Peru) Erik Mendoza; W 2–0	2 Q	(United States) Jake Bredenbeck; L 0–2	Did not advance			9
Luis Pérez	Singles	(Canada) Samuel Murray; L 1–2	(Cuba) Enier Chacón; W 2–0	(Argentina) Fernando Kurzbard; W 2–0	2 Q	(United States) Charles Pratt; L 1–2	Did not advance			9
Luis Pérez; Ramón de León	Doubles	(Costa Rica) Andrés Acuña; Felipe Camacho; L 0–2	(Mexico) Francisco Javier García; Rodrigo Montoya; L 1–2	(Cuba) Enier Chacón; Maykel Moyet; W 2–1	3	(Colombia) Sebastian Franco; Mario Mercado; L 0–2	Did not advance			9
Luis Pérez; Ramón de León	Team	—N/a				Guatemala; L 1–2	Did not advance			9

Women

Athlete	Event	Qualifying Round robin				Round of 16	Quarterfinals	Semifinals	Final	Rank
Athlete	Event	Match 1	Match 2	Match 3	Rank	Opposition Result	Opposition Result	Opposition Result	Opposition Result	Rank
Alejandra Jiménez	Singles	(Guatemala) Gabriela Martínez; L 0–2	(Argentina) María José Vargas; L 0–2	-	3	Did not advance				
Merynanyelly Delgado	Singles	(Mexico) Paola Longoria; L 0–2	(Guatemala) María Rodríguez; W 2–1	-	2 Q	(United States) Rhonda Rajsich; L 0–2	Did not advance			9
Alejandra Jiménez; Merynanyelly Delgado	Doubles	(Bolivia) Angelica Barrios; Jenny Daza; L 1–2	(Canada) Frédérique Lambert; Jennifer Saunders; W 2–1	(Guatemala) Gabriela Martínez; María Rodríguez; L 0–2	3 Q	(Chile) Carla Muñoz; Josefa Parada; W 2–0	(Mexico) Paola Longoria; Samantha Salas; L 0–2	Did not advance		5
Alejandra Jiménez; Merynanyelly Delgado	Team	—N/a				Canada; L 1–2	Did not advance			9

== Rowing ==
Men

Athlete	Event	Heat		Repechage		Semifinal		Final	
Athlete	Event	Time	Rank	Time	Rank	Time	Rank	Time	Rank
Ignacio Vasquez	Single sculls	7:44.32	4 R	7:21.20	1 SF	7:36.21	6 FB	7:22.88	10

== Sailing ==
Dominican Republic has qualified 1 boat for a total of 1 sailor.

Open

Athlete	Event	Race																					Total	
Athlete	Event	1	2	3	4	5	6	7	8	9	10	11	12	13	14	15	16	17	18	M1	M2	M3	Points	Rank
Cristino Soto	Kites	7	10	8	5	7	9	8	8	5	7	8	11 (DNF)	7	11 (DNF)	11 (DNF)	4	3	6	Did not advance			102	7

== Shooting ==
Men

Athlete	Event	Qualification		Final	
Athlete	Event	Points	Rank	Points	Rank
Josué Hernández	10 m air pistol	557	24	Did not advance	
Josué Hernández	25 m rapid fire pistol	DNS		Did not advance	
Hosman Duran	10 m air rifle	574.0	29	Did not advance	
Hosman Duran	50 m rifle three position	1069	26	Did not advance	
Eduardo Casasnovas	Trap	111	17	Did not advance	
David Yunes	Trap	110	19	Did not advance	
Julio Dujarric	Skeet	120	7	Did not advance	

Women

Athlete	Event	Qualification		Final	
Athlete	Event	Points	Rank	Points	Rank
Victória González	10 m air pistol	522	28	Did not advance	
Victória González	10 m air pistol	517	25	Did not advance	

Mixed

Athlete	Event	Qualification		Final	
Athlete	Event	Points	Rank	Points	Rank
Josué Hernández; Victória González	10 m air pistol	707	24	Did not advance	

== Table tennis ==
Men

Athlete	Event	Group stage			Round of 32	Round of 16	Quarterfinal	Semifinal	Final / BM	
Athlete	Event	Opposition Result	Opposition Result	Rank	Opposition Result	Opposition Result	Opposition Result	Opposition Result	Opposition Result	Rank
Emil Santos	Singles	—N/a			Kumar (USA); L 2–4	did not advance				
Jiaji Wu	Singles	—N/a			Campos (CUB); W 4–2	Tsuboi (BRA); W 4–2	Afanador (PUR); W 4–1	Jha (USA); W 4–2	Calderano (BRA); L 3–4	2nd place, silver medalist(s)
Emil Santos; Jiaji Wu	Doubles	—N/a				Gómez / Lamadrid (CHI); V 4–1	Hazin / Wang (CAN); V 4–3	Alto / Cifuentes (ARG); D 3–4	Did not advance	3rd place, bronze medalist(s)
Emil Santos; Jiaji Wu; Samuel Galvez	Team	Chile; W 3–1	Cuba; L 1–3	2 Q	—N/a		United States; L 1–3, 0–3, 3–0, 0–3	did not advance		

Women

Athlete	Event	Group stage			Round of 32	Round of 16	Quarterfinal	Semifinal	Final / BM	
Athlete	Event	Opposition Result	Opposition Result	Rank	Opposition Result	Opposition Result	Opposition Result	Opposition Result	Opposition Result	Rank
Eva Brito	Singles	—N/a			Chung (TTO); W 4–1	Díaz (PUR); L 0–4	Não avançou			
Yasiris Ortíz	Singles	—N/a			Ortega (CHI); W 4–3	Takahashi (BRA); L 0–4	Não avançou			
Esmerlyn Castro; Yasiris Ortíz	Doubles	—N/a				Mori / Vargas (PER); W 4–1	Takahashi / Yamada (BRA); L 1–4	did not advance		
Eva Brito; Esmerlyn Castro; Yasiris Ortíz	Team	Puerto Rico; L 1–3	Cuba; L 1–3	3	—N/a		did not advance			

Mixed

Athlete	Event	Round of 16	Quarterfinal	Semifinal	Final / BM	
Athlete	Event	Opposition Result	Opposition Result	Opposition Result	Opposition Result	Rank
Jiaji Wu; Yasiris Ortíz	Doubles	Aguirre / Gómez (PAR); W 4–2	Jha / Wu (USA); L 2–4	did not advance		

== Taekwondo ==
Kyorugi (sparring)

Men

Athlete	Event	Preliminary round	Quarterfinal	Semifinal	Repechage	Final / BM	
Athlete	Event	Opposition Result	Opposition Result	Opposition Result	Opposition Result	Opposition Result	Rank
Luisito Pie	–58 kg	Granado (VEN); L 5-9	Did not advance				
Bernardo Pie	–68 kg	Hernández (PUR); W 16-4	Nickolas (USA); W 10-9	—N/a	Nkogho (CAN); W 18-7	Pontes (BRA); L 14-17	2nd place, silver medalist(s)
Moisés Hernández	–80 kg	Bye	Ferrera (HON); W 15-7	Martins (BRA); L 0-1	—N/a	Bronze medal contest Lizarraga (MEX); W 8-5	3rd place, bronze medalist(s)
Fraily Mora	+80 kg	Sio (VEN); L 10-24	Did not advance				

Women

Athlete	Event	Preliminary round	Quarterfinal	Semifinal	Repechage	Final / BM	
Athlete	Event	Opposition Result	Opposition Result	Opposition Result	Opposition Result	Opposition Result	Rank
Génesis Andújar	–57 kg	Aguirre (CHI); L 7-27	Did not advance				
Madelyn Rodríguez	–67 kg	Chirinos (PER); W 22-2	Kraayeveld (CAN); L 7-12	Did not advance			
Katherine Rodríguez	+67 kg	Bye	Fidelis (BRA); L RSC	Did not advance			

== Tennis ==
Men

Athlete	Event	Round of 64	Round of 32	Round of 16	Quarterfinal	Semifinal	Final / BM	
Athlete	Event	Opposition Result	Opposition Result	Opposition Result	Opposition Result	Opposition Result	Opposition Result	Rank
José Hernández-Fernández	Singles	Bye	Roberts (BAH); W 6–4, 6–2	Tabilo (CHI); W 6–2, 3–6, 6–4	Bagnis (ARG); L 2–6, 3–6	Did not advance		
Víctor Estrella Burgos	Singles	Mejía (COL); W 6–4, 6–2	Quiroz (DOM); L 5–7, 1–6	Did not advance				
Roberto Cid Subervi	Singles	Bye	Lewis (BAR); W 6–2, 6–3	Giraldo (COL); W 6–2, 7–5	Andreozzi (ARG); L 1–6, 4–6	Did not advance		
Roberto Cid; Víctor Estrella	Doubles	—N/a	Bye	Llanes / Roncadelli (URU); V 6–1, 7–5	Arias / Zeballos (BOL); D 2–6, 7–6, 2–10	Did not advance		

Women

Athlete	Event	Round of 32	Round of 16	Quarterfinal	Semifinal	Final / BM	
Athlete	Event	Opposition Result	Opposition Result	Opposition Result	Opposition Result	Opposition Result	Rank
Kelly Williford	Singles	Herazo (COL); L 0–6, 3–6	Did not advance				

Mixed

Athlete	Event	Round of 16	Quarterfinal	Semifinal	Final / BM	
Athlete	Event	Opposition Result	Opposition Result	Opposition Result	Opposition Result	Rank
José Hernández; Kelly Williford	Doubles	Bye	González / Weedon (GUA); L 2–6, 5–7	Did not advance		

== Triathlon ==
Individual

Athlete	Event	Swimming (1.5 km)	Transition 1	Biking (40.02 km)	Transition 2	Running (8.88 km)	Total	Rank
Camila Taveras	Women's	21:39	1:00	DNF				

== Volleyball ==
=== Beach ===
The Dominican Republic qualified a men's pair.

Athlete	Event	Group stage				Round of 16	Quarterfinal	Semifinal	Final / BM	
Athlete	Event	Opposition Result	Opposition Result	Opposition Result	Rank	Opposition Result	Opposition Result	Opposition Result	Opposition Result	Rank
Alex Medina; William Sánchez	Men's	Vásquez – Seminario (PER); W (21–11, 21-14)	Leonardo – García (GUA); L (19–21, 15-21)	Hernández – Gómez (VEN); L (14–21, 16-21)	3 Q	González – Reyes (CUB); L (17–21, 14-21)	—N/a	9th-12th place classification Satterfield – Burik (USA); L (13–21, 12-21)	11th place match Escobar – Vargas (ESA); W (21–11, 21-14)	11

=== Indoor ===
The Dominican Republic qualified a women's team (of 12 athletes) by winning the silver medal at the 2018 Women's Pan-American Volleyball Cup.

Summary

Team	Event	Group stage				Semifinal	Final / BM / Pl.	
Team	Event	Opposition Result	Opposition Result	Opposition Result	Rank	Opposition Result	Opposition Result	Rank
Dominican Republic women	Women's tournament	Colombia; W 3–1	Canada; W 3–0	Peru; W 3–0	1 Q	Argentina; W 3–1	Colombia; W 3–1	1st place, gold medalist(s)

=== Women's tournament ===
Group stage

Pos	Team	Pld	W	L	Pts	SW	SL	SR	SPW	SPL	SPR	Qualification
1	Dominican Republic	3	3	0	14	9	1	9.000	252	212	1.189	Semifinals
2	Colombia	3	2	1	9	7	5	1.400	289	274	1.055	Semifinals
3	Peru (H)	3	1	2	5	4	7	0.571	239	252	0.948	5th–6th place match
4	Canada	3	0	3	2	2	9	0.222	224	266	0.842	7th–8th place match

Source: Lima 2019
(H) Host

7 August 2019; 18:30	Dominican Republic	3–1	Colombia	Callao Sports Center; Referees: Josmer Pérez Broche (FIV), Karina Rene (ARG)
7 August 2019; 18:30	(26–24, 27–25, 22–25, 27–25); P2 P3			Callao Sports Center; Referees: Josmer Pérez Broche (FIV), Karina Rene (ARG)

8 August 2019; 18:30	Dominican Republic	3–0	Canada	Callao Sports Center
8 August 2019; 18:30	(25–16, 25–22, 25–23); P2 P3			Callao Sports Center

9 August 2019; 20:30	Peru	0–3	Dominican Republic	Callao Sports Center
9 August 2019; 20:30	(19–25, 16–25, 17–25); P2 P3			Callao Sports Center

Semifinal

10 August 2019; 20:30	Dominican Republic	3–1	Argentina	Callao Sports Center; Referees: Héctor Ortiz (PUR), James Juscamaita (PER)
10 August 2019; 20:30	(25–18, 26–28, 25–13, 25–21); P2 P3			Callao Sports Center; Referees: Héctor Ortiz (PUR), James Juscamaita (PER)

Gold medal match

11 August 2019; 11:00	Colombia	1–3	Dominican Republic	Callao Sports Center
11 August 2019; 11:00	(20–25, 25–19, 25–27, 16–25); P2 P3			Callao Sports Center

== Water skiing ==
Water skiing

Men

Athlete	Event	Preliminary		Final				
Athlete	Event	Score	Rank	Slalom	Jump	Tricks	Total	Rank
Robert Pigozzi	Slalom	2.50/58/10.25	1 Q	2.50/58/10.25	—N/a	—N/a	2.50/58/10.25	1st place, gold medalist(s)

Women

Athlete	Event	Preliminary		Final				
Athlete	Event	Score	Rank	Slalom	Jump	Tricks	Total	Rank
Francesca Pigozzi	Slalom	5.00/55/18.25	12	did not advance				
Francesca Pigozzi	Tricks	180	13	did not advance				
Francesca Pigozzi	Jump	48	10	did not advance				
Francesca Pigozzi	Overall	110.39	10	did not advance				

== Weightlifting ==
The Dominican Republic qualified eight weightlifters (four men and four women).

Men

Athlete	Event	Snatch		Clean & jerk		Total	
Athlete	Event	Weight	Rank	Weight	Rank	Weight	Rank
Luis García	–61 kg	121	5	160	4	281	4
Julio Cedeño	–73 kg	144	3	174	3	318	3rd place, bronze medalist(s)
Zacarias Bonnat	–81 kg	160	2	200	1	360	2nd place, silver medalist(s)

Women

Athlete	Event	Snatch		Clean & jerk		Total	
Athlete	Event	Weight	Rank	Weight	Rank	Weight	Rank
Beatriz Pirón	–49 kg	87	1	106	1	193	1st place, gold medalist(s)
Santa Cotes	–49 kg	80	4	97	3	177	3rd place, bronze medalist(s)
Crismery Santana	–87 kg	117	1	141	3	258	2nd place, silver medalist(s)
Veronica Saladin	+87kg	130	1	153	2	283	2nd place, silver medalist(s)

== Wrestling ==
Key:
- VT – Victory by fall.
- PP – Decision by points – the loser with technical points.
- PO – Decision by points – the loser without technical points.
- SP – Technical superiority – the loser with technical points and a margin of victory of at least 9 (Greco-Roman) or 10 (freestyle) points.
- ST – Great superiority – the loser without technical points and a margin of victory of at least 8 (Greco-Roman) or 10 (freestyle) points.
- VA – Decision by withdrawal

Men

Athlete	Event	Round of 16	Quarterfinal	Semifinal	Final / BM	
Athlete	Event	Opposition Result	Opposition Result	Opposition Result	Opposition Result	Rank
Juan Rubelín Ramírez	Freestyle 57 kg	—N/a	Capellan (CAN); W 10–0	Tigreros (COL); W 9–4	Fix (USA); L 0–11	2nd place, silver medalist(s)
Álbaro Rudesindo	Freestyle 65 kg	—N/a	Díaz (MEX); W 10–0	Sánchez (ECU); W 10–0	Valdés (CUB); L 0–10	2nd place, silver medalist(s)
Julio Rodríguez	Freestyle 74 kg	—N/a	Garzón (CUB); L 2–5	did not advance		
Luis Miguel Pérez	Freestyle 97 kg	—N/a	Lacey (CRC); W 12–2	Díaz (VEN); L 1–8	Bronze medal contest Steen (CAN); W 10–0	3rd place, bronze medalist(s)
Jancel Pimentel	Greco-Roman 60 kg	—N/a	Pérez (MEX); L 0–9	did not advance		
Luis de León	Greco-Roman 67 kg	—N/a	Borrero (CUB); L 0–8	Did not advance	Bronze medal contest Coleman (USA); L 1–4	5
Johan Batista	Greco-Roman 77 kg	Bye	Peña (CUB); L 0–6	did not advance		
Carlos Adames	Greco-Roman 87 kg	Bye	Grégorich (CUB); L 0–8	did not advance		
José Antonio Arias	Greco-Roman 97 kg	—N/a	Cruz (PER); W 4–2	Rosillo (CUB); L 0–8	Bronze medal contest Pérez (VEN); L 0–9	5
Leo Santana	Greco-Roman 130 kg	—N/a	Medina (PER); W 8–0	Pérez (VEN); L 0–7	Bronze medal contest López (PUR); W 2–0	3rd place, bronze medalist(s)
