= Dominique Schaefer =

Peruvian-American tennis player

- Country (sports): Peru; United States
- Residence: California, United States
- Born: 7 January 1999 (age 27) Lima, Peru
- Plays: Right-handed (two-handed backhand)
- Prize money: $14,187

Singles
- Career record: 65–51
- Career titles: 0
- Highest ranking: No. 589 (1 July 2019)

Grand Slam singles results
- French Open Junior: 1R (2016)
- Wimbledon Junior: 1R (2016)

Doubles
- Career record: 26–20
- Career titles: 0
- Highest ranking: No. 630 (22 July 2019)

Grand Slam doubles results
- French Open Junior: 1R (2016)
- Wimbledon Junior: 1R (2016)

Team competitions
- Fed Cup: 7–5
- Last updated on: 21 April 2024.

Dominique Schaefer (born 7 January 1999) is an inactive Peruvian–American tennis player and current pickleball player.

On the tennis junior tour, she has a career-high junior ranking of 25, achieved in May 2016.

Playing for Peru Fed Cup team, Schaefer has a win–loss record of 7–5 in Fed Cup competition.

== ITF Circuit finals ==
=== Doubles: 3 (3 runner–ups) ===
Legend
$25,000 tournaments
$15,000 tournaments

Result	Date	Tournament	Surface	Partner	Opponents	Score
Loss	Dec 2017	ITF Guayaquil, Ecuador	Hard	(United States) Stephanie Nemtsova	(Mexico) María Portillo Ramírez (United States) Sofia Sewing	5–7, 2–6
Loss	Mar 2018	ITF São José dos Campos, Brazil	Clay	(Greece) Eleni Kordolaimi	(Brazil) Carolina Alves (Brazil) Thaisa Grana Pedretti	4–6, 1–6
Loss	Apr 2018	ITF Villa del Dique, Argentina	Clay	(Chile) Fernanda Brito	(Brazil) Nathaly Kurata (Brazil) Eduarda Piai	0–6, 4–6
