= Justin Roberts (tennis) =

Bahamian tennis player

- Country (sports): Bahamas
- Residence: Nassau, Bahamas
- Born: 4 December 1996 (age 29) Nassau, Bahamas
- Height: 1.83 m (6 ft 0 in)
- Plays: Right-handed (one-handed backhand)
- College: Arizona State University
- Coach: Chris Begg, Shariq Khan, Matt Hill
- Prize money: US $42,205

Singles
- Career record: 0–0 (at ATP Tour level, Grand Slam level, and in Davis Cup)
- Career titles: 0
- Highest ranking: No. 753 (16 September 2019)
- Current ranking: No. 965 (19 October 2026)

Doubles
- Career record: 0–0 (at ATP Tour level, Grand Slam level, and in Davis Cup)
- Career titles: 0
- Highest ranking: No. 908 (16 November 2020)
- Current ranking: No. 1,550 (19 October 2026)

Team competitions
- Davis Cup: 1–0
- Last updated on: 19 October 2026.

Justin Roberts (born 4 December 1996) is a Bahamian tennis player. He has a career high ATP singles ranking of No. 753 achieved on 16 September 2019 and a career high ATP doubles ranking of No. 908 achieved on 16 November 2020. Roberts has won one ITF singles title and one ITF doubles title on the tour.

Roberts represents Bahamas at the Davis Cup, where he has a win–loss record of 1–0.
