= Barbados at the 2019 Pan American Games =

- IOC code: BAR
- NOC: Barbados Olympic Association

in Lima, Peru 26 July–11 August 2019
- Competitors: 31 in 12 sports
- Flag bearer: Chelsea Tuach (opening)
- Medals Ranked =23rd: Gold 1 Silver 0 Bronze 0 Total 1

Pan American Games appearances (overview)
- 1963; 1967; 1971; 1975; 1979; 1983; 1987; 1991; 1995; 1999; 2003; 2007; 2011; 2015; 2019; 2023

Barbados competed at the 2019 Pan American Games in Lima, Peru from July 26 to August 11, 2019.

On July 19, 2019, the Barbados Olympic Association announced a team of 31 (16 men and 15 women) athletes competing in 12 sports. Surfer Chelsea Tuach was also named as the country's flag bearer during the opening ceremony.

During the opening ceremony of the games, surfer Chelsea Tuach carried the flag of the country as part of the parade of nations.

Hurdler Shane Brathwaite won the country's first ever gold medal at the Pan American Games. Brathwaite's medal was the only one that was won by the country. This ranked the country an equal 23rd with the British Virgin Islands.

== Competitors ==
The following is the list of number of competitors (per gender) participating at the games per sport/discipline.

Sport	Men	Women	Total
Athletics (track and field)	4	6	10
Badminton	2	2	4
Cycling	0	1	1
Equestrian	0	1	1
Golf	0	1	1
Sailing	0	1	1
Shooting	2	1	3
Surfing	0	1	1
Swimming	3	1	4
Taekwondo	1	0	1
Tennis	3	0	3
Triathlon	1	0	1
Total	16	15	31

== Medalists ==
The following competitors from Barbados won medals at the games. In the by discipline sections below, medalists' names are bolded.

Medal	Name	Sport	Event	Date
Gold	Shane Brathwaite	Athletics	Men's 110 m hurdles	August 10

== Athletics (track and field) ==
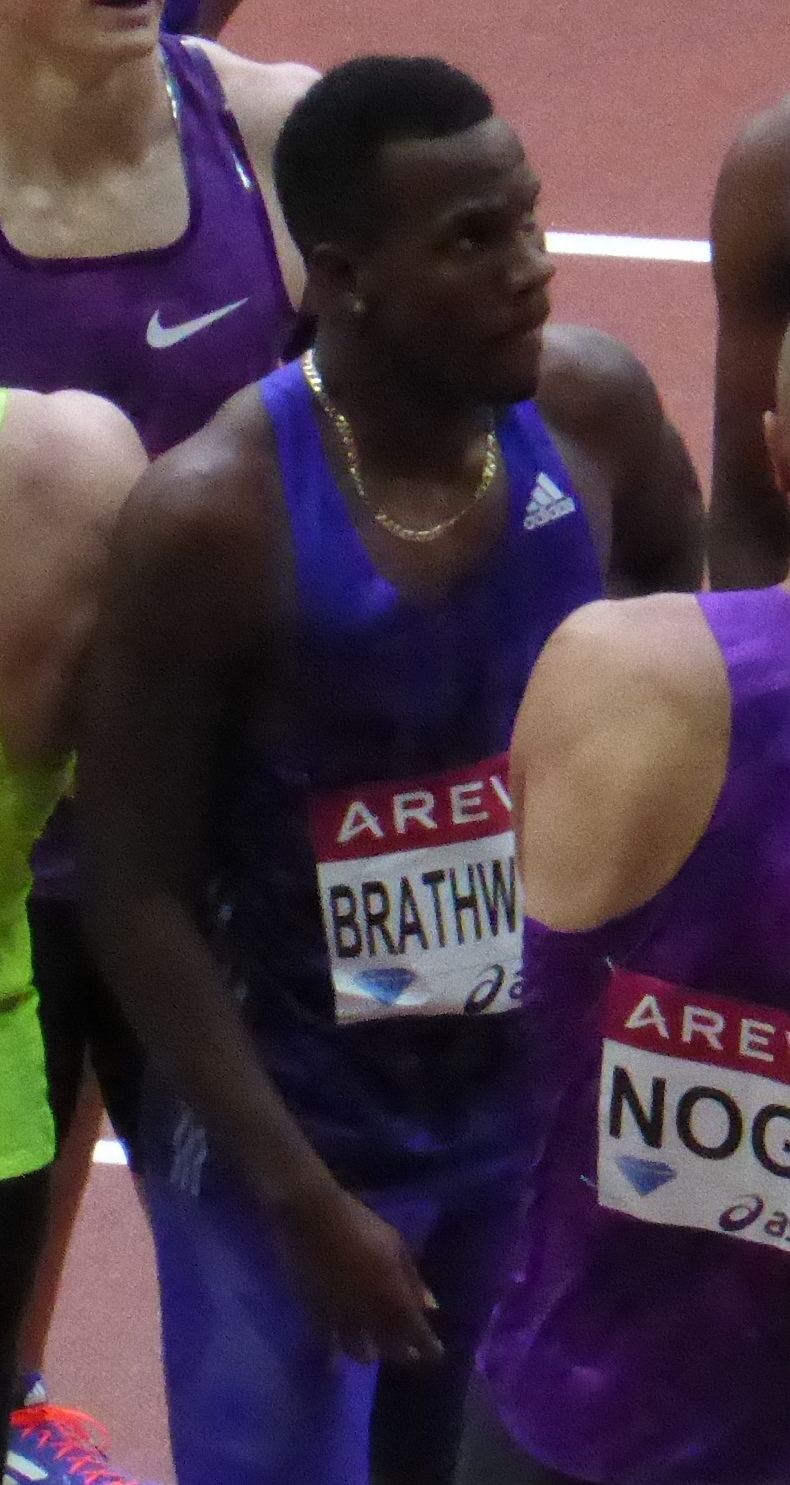
Shane Brathwaite became Barbados' first ever Pan American Games champion

Barbados qualified ten athletes (four men and six women).

Key

- Note–Ranks given for track events are for the entire round
- **Q** = Qualified for the next round
- **q** = Qualified for the next round as a fastest loser
- **NR** = National record
- **PB** = Personal best
- **SB** = Seasonal best

Men
Track events

Athlete	Event	Semifinals		Final	
Athlete	Event	Result	Rank	Result	Rank
Mario Burke	100 m	10.46	14	Did not advance	
Jonathan Jones	400 m	45.60	6 **Q**	45.35	5
**Shane Brathwaite**	110 m hurdles	13.49	2 **Q**	13.31 **SB**	1st place, gold medalist(s)
Greggmar Swift	110 m hurdles	13.59	4 **Q**	13.51	4

Women
Track events

Athlete	Event	Semifinals		Final	
Athlete	Event	Result	Rank	Result	Rank
Tristan Evelyn	100 m	11.89	16	Did not advance	
Ariel Jackson	100 m	12.31	20	Did not advance	
Sada Williams	400 m	52.39	6 **Q**	52.25	6
Sonia Gaskin	800 m	2:05.85	7 **Q**	2:05.68	8
Sade Sealy	800 m	2:03.23 **PB**	2 **Q**	2:02.23 **NR**	4
Tia-Adana Belle	400 m hurdles	56.53	7 **q**	55.93	5

== Badminton ==
Barbados qualified a team of four badminton athletes (two per gender).

Singles

Athlete	Event	Round of 64	Round of 32	Round of 16	Quarterfinals	Semifinals	Final	Rank
Athlete	Event	Opposition Result	Opposition Result	Opposition Result	Opposition Result	Opposition Result	Opposition Result	Rank
Damien Howell	Men's singles	Seixas (PAN); **L** 0–2 (17–21, 17–21)	Did not advance					
Dakeil Thorpe	Men's singles	Bye	Martínez (CUB); **L** 0–2 (8–21, 6–21)	Did not advance				
Sabrina Scott	Women's singles	Bye	Wynter (JAM); **L** 0–2 (20–22, 11–21)	Did not advance				
Tamisha Williams	Women's singles	Siviora (BOL); **W** 2–0 (21–7, 21–4)	Richardson (JAM); **W** 2–0 (21–19, 21–15)	Oropeza (CUB); **L** 0–2 (11–21, 10–21)	Did not advance			

Doubles

Athlete	Event	Round of 32	Round of 16	Quarterfinals	Semifinals	Final	Rank
Athlete	Event	Opposition Result	Opposition Result	Opposition Result	Opposition Result	Opposition Result	Rank
Damien Howell; Dakeil Thorpe	Men's doubles	—N/a	López / Navarro (MEX); **L** 0–2 (14–21, 14–21)	Did not advance			
Sabrina Scott; Tamisha Williams	Women's doubles	—N/a	Salazar / Regal (PER); **L** 0–2 (12–21, 12–21)	Did not advance			
Damien Howell; Sabrina Scott	Mixed doubles	Guerrero / Oropeza (CUB); **L** 0–2 (7–21, 10–21)	Did not advance				
Dakeil Thorpe; Tamisha Williams	Mixed doubles	Cavallotti / Villalobos (CRC); **W** 2–0 (21–13, 21–10)	Javier / Jiménez (DOM); **L** 0–2 (16–21, 12–21)	Did not advance			

== Cycling ==
Barbados qualified one female cyclist.

=== Track ===
Women

Athlete	Event	Scratch		Tempo		Elimination		Points race		Total points	
Athlete	Event	Points	Rank	Points	Rank	Points	Rank	Points	Rank	Points	Rank
Amber Joseph	Omnium	34	4	1	6	98	4	12	6	110	6

== Equestrian ==
Barbados qualified a single equestrian.

=== Dressage ===
Athlete	Horse	Event	Qualification						Grand Prix Freestyle / Intermediate I Freestyle	
Athlete	Horse	Event	Grand Prix / Prix St. Georges		Grand Prix Special / Intermediate I		Total		Grand Prix Freestyle / Intermediate I Freestyle	
Athlete	Horse	Event	Score	Rank	Score	Rank	Score	Rank	Score	Rank
Roberta Foster	Chic Chic	Individual	66.618	17	67.059	14	133.677	15 **Q**	69.115	14

== Golf ==
Barbados qualified one female golfer. Emily Odwin was the youngest female golfer at the games, and finished in a tie for 26th place in a field of 32 golfers.

Athlete(s)	Event	Final						
Athlete(s)	Event	Round 1	Round 2	Round 3	Round 4	Total	To par	Rank
Emily Odwin	Women's individual	80	73	78	74	305	+21	=26

== Sailing ==
Barbados received a universality spot in the women's laser radial event.

Women

Athlete	Event	Race											Net points	Final rank
Athlete	Event	1	2	3	4	5	6	7	8	9	10	M	Net points	Final rank
Amy Cox	Laser radial	17	15	17	15	13	14	14	17	15	13	Did not qualify	133	16

== Shooting ==
Barbados qualified three sport shooters (two men and one woman).

Athlete	Event	Qualification		Final	
Athlete	Event	Points	Rank	Points	Rank
Michael Maskell	Men's skeet	108	23	Did not advance	
Justin St John	Men's trap	103	25	Did not advance	
Michelle Elliot	Women's skeet	106	8	Did not advance	

== Surfing ==
Barbados qualified one female surfer in the sport's debut at the Pan American Games.

Women

Athlete	Event	Main round 1	Main round 2	Repechage 1	Repechage 2	Main round 3	Repechage 3	Repechage 4	Repechage 5	Main round 4	Final / BM	Rank
Athlete	Event	Opposition Result	Opposition Result	Opposition Result	Opposition Result	Opposition Result	Opposition Result	Opposition Result	Opposition Result	Opposition Result	Opposition Result	Rank
Chelsea Tuach	Open surf	Gómez (COL); **W** 12.40–8.00	Rosas (PER); **W** 7.00–15.27	Bye	Gómez (COL); **L** 10.83–13.40	Did not advance						=9

== Swimming ==
Barbados qualified four swimmers (three men and one woman).

Key

- Note – Ranks given are for the entire round
- **NR** – National record
- **QA** – Qualified for Final A
- **QB** – Qualified for Final B

Athlete	Event	Heat		Final	
Athlete	Event	Time	Rank	Time	Rank
Jack Kirby	Men's 50 m freestyle	23.82	22	Did not advance	
Jack Kirby	Men's 100 m backstroke	56.08	8 **QA**	56.38	8
Jack Kirby	Men's 200 m backstroke	2:05.59	14 **QB**	2:07.66	16
Alex Sobers	Men's 100 m freestyle	52.45	25	Did not advance	
Alex Sobers	Men's 200 m freestyle	1:51.76	11 **QB**	1:50.87	9
Alex Sobers	Men's 400 m freestyle	3:57.66	10 **QB**	3:58.39	9
Luis Weekes	Men's 100 m breaststroke	1:05.65	21	Did not advance	
Luis Weekes	Men's 200 m breaststroke	2:25.95	20	Did not advance	
Luis Weekes	Men's 200 m individual medley	2:17.60	24	Did not advance	
Danielle Titus	Women's 100 m backstroke	1:05.40	16 **QB**	1:04.95	14
Danielle Titus	Women's 200 m backstroke	2:21.37 **NR**	15 **QB**	2:27.44	16

== Taekwondo ==
Barbados received one wildcard in the men's +80 kg event.

Kyorugi
Men

Athlete	Event	Round of 16	Quarterfinals	Semifinals	Repechage	Final / BM	Rank
Athlete	Event	Opposition Result	Opposition Result	Opposition Result	Opposition Result	Opposition Result	Rank
Askia Alleyne	+80 kg	Stewart (CAN); **L** 4–24	Did not advance				

== Tennis ==
Barbados qualified three male tennis players.

Men

Athlete	Event	First round	Round of 32	Round of 16	Quarterfinals	Semifinals	Final / BM	
Athlete	Event	Opposition Score	Opposition Score	Opposition Score	Opposition Score	Opposition Score	Opposition Score	Rank
Darian King	Singles	Bye	Riffice (USA); **W** 6–4, 6–3	Varillas (PER); **L** 1–6, 2–6	Did not advance			
Haydn Lewis	Singles	Hernández (MEX); **W** 6–3, 7–6	Subervi (DOM); **L** 2–6, 3–6	Did not advance				
Seanon Williams	Singles	Roncadelli (URU); **L** 0–6, 0–6	Did not advance					
Darian King; Haydn Lewis	Doubles	—N/a	Bye	Galdós / Varillas (PER); **L** 7–6, 3–6, [8–10]	Did not advance			

== Triathlon ==
Barbados qualified one male triathlete.

Men

Athlete	Event	Swim (1.5 km)	Trans 1	Bike (40 km)	Trans 2	Run (8.88 km)	Total	Rank
Matthew Wright	Individual	17:49	:47	1:00:32	:22	32:34	1:52:00	10

== See also ==
- Barbados at the 2020 Summer Olympics
