= Archery at the 2019 Pan American Games – Men's individual recurve =

Men's individual recurve at the 2019 Pan American Games
- Venue: Villa Maria de Triunfo
- Dates: August 7–11
- Competitors: 32 from 14 nations

Medalists
Gold medal	Crispin Duenas	Canada
Silver medal	Marcus Vinicius D'Almeida	Brazil
Bronze medal	Eric Peters	Canada

The men's individual recurve competition of the archery events at the 2019 Pan American Games was held from 7 August to 11 August at the Archery field at the Villa Maria de Triunfo in Lima, Peru.

== Schedule ==
Date	Time	Round
August 7, 2019	8:30	Ranking round
August 9, 2019	9:00	1/16 elimination
August 9, 2019	9:35	1/8 elimination
August 9, 2019	11:20	Quarterfinals
August 11, 2019	11:34	Semifinals
August 11, 2019	14:42	Finals

== Results ==
=== Ranking round ===
The results were as follows:

Rank	Archer	Nation	Score	Notes
1	Brady Ellison	United States	702	WR
2	Marcus Vinicius D'Almeida	Brazil	692	
3	Jack Williams	United States	689	
4	Crispin Duenas	Canada	681	
5	Daniel Pineda	Colombia	673	
6	Ángel Alvarado	Mexico	672	
7	Luis Álvarez	Mexico	672	
8	Thomas Stanwood	United States	666	
9	Eric Peters	Canada	661	
10	Adrián Puentes	Cuba	659	
11	Bernardo Oliveira	Brazil	659	
12	Andrés Pila	Colombia	659	
13	Hugo Franco	Cuba	658	
14	Mario Jajarabilla	Argentina	657	
15	Andres Aguilar Gimpel	Chile	656	
16	Juan Carlos Stevens	Cuba	655	
17	Elías Malavé	Venezuela	634	
18	Ricardo Soto	Chile	652	
19	Marcelo Costa	Brazil	651	
20	Daniel Catariz	Trinidad and Tobago	649	
21	Thomas Flossbach	Guatemala	649	
22	Diego Castro Rojas	Guatemala	648	
23	Willian O'Brien	Peru	647	
24	Jose Alvarez Muñoz	Ecuador	645	
25	Ernesto Boardman	Mexico	639	
26	Brian Maxwell	Canada	638	
27	Oscar Guillén	El Salvador	654	
28	Daniel Betancur	Colombia	633	
29	Lester Ortegon	Ecuador	624	
30	Juan Painevil	Chile	624	
31	José López Palacios	Guatemala	605	
32	Kevin Sabado	Argentina	585	

=== Elimination rounds ===
The results were as follows:

==== Finals ====
Semifinals
9	Eric Peters (CAN)	2	27	26	26	29
4	Crispin Duenas (CAN)	6	27	30	28	29
11	Bernardo Oliveira (BRA)	3	28	25	27	28	25
2	Marcus Vinicius D'Almeida (BRA)	7	27	29	27	29	28

Final
4	Crispin Duenas (CAN)	6	28	28	26	28	28
2	Marcus Vinicius D'Almeida (BRA)	4	27	27	28	28	28
Third place
9	Eric Peters (CAN)	7	28	28	27	30
11	Bernardo Oliveira (BRA)	1	28	26	26	28

==== Top half ====
1/16 elimination
1	Brady Ellison (USA)	6	30	29	29
32	Kevin Sabado (ARG)	0	24	23	23
17	Elías Malavé (VEN)	5^{8}	26	27	26	26	30
16	Juan Carlos Stevens (CUB)	6^{9}	27	27	27	24	28
9	Eric Peters (CAN)	6	29	26	28	29
24	Jose Alvarez Muñoz (ECU)	2	27	28	27	26
25	Ernesto Boardman (MEX)	6	27	25	29	27	27
8	Thomas Stanwood (USA)	4	27	28	28	27	25
5	Daniel Pineda (COL)	6	27	28	27	29
28	Daniel Betancur (COL)	2	26	25	28	27
21	Thomas Flossbach (GUA)	1	26	27	24	26
12	Andrés Pila (COL)	7	29	27	27	'28
13	Hugo Franco (CUB)	7	26	29	27	27
20	Daniel Catariz (TTO)	1	26	24	24	26
29	Lester Ortegon (ECU)	0	25	27	28
4	Crispin Duenas (CAN)	6	27	29	29

1/8 elimination
1	Brady Ellison (USA)	7	28	29	28	28
16	Juan Carlos Stevens (CUB)	1	27	27	28	25
9	Eric Peters (CAN)	7	29	27	28	26	29
25	Ernesto Boardman (MEX)	3	28	27	26	27	26
5	Daniel Pineda (COL)	6^{19}	28	26	27	28	29
12	Andrés Pila (COL)	5^{18}	28	26	27	29	26
13	Hugo Franco (CUB)	1	25	29	25	29
4	Crispin Duenas (CAN)	7	28	29	29	30

Quarter-finals
1	Brady Ellison (USA)	0	28	27	29
9	Eric Peters (CAN)	6	29	29	30
5	Daniel Pineda (COL)	2	28	29	28	27
4	Crispin Duenas (CAN)	6	30	26	29	29

Semifinals
9	Eric Peters (CAN)	2	27	26	26	29
4	Crispin Duenas (CAN)	6	27	30	28	29

==== Bottom half ====
1/16 elimination
3	Jack Williams (USA)	6	29	28	27	29
30	Juan Painevil (CHI)	2	27	28	21	29
19	Marcelo Costa (BRA)	4	23	25	27	27	26
14	Mario Jajarabilla (ARG)	6	27	29	26	26	28
11	Bernardo Oliveira (BRA)	6	21	29	28	27
22	Diego Castro Rojas (GUA)	2	28	24	26	25
27	Oscar Guillén (ESA)	2	27	28	26	25
6	Ángel Alvarado (MEX)	6	26	29	28	29
7	Luis Álvarez (MEX)	6	28	28	25
26	Brian Maxwell (CAN)	0	24	26	24
23	Willian O'Brien (PER)	0	25	24	27
10	Adrián Puentes (CUB)	6	26	28	29
15	Andres Aguilar Gimpel (CHI)	6	27	29	29
18	Ricardo Soto (CHI)	0	24	28	28
31	José López Palacios (GUA)	0	24	28	26
2	Marcus Vinicius D'Almeida (BRA)	6	29	30	30

1/8 elimination
3	Jack Williams (USA)	7	26	30	28	28	29
14	Mario Jajarabilla (ARG)	3	28	26	25	28	27
11	Bernardo Oliveira (BRA)	6	29	28	28	27	27
6	Ángel Alvarado (MEX)	4	27	28	25	28	27
7	Luis Álvarez (MEX)	4	30	26	29	28	26
10	Adrián Puentes (CUB)	6	26	27	25	29	28
15	Andres Aguilar Gimpel (CHI)	1	22	27	28	27
2	Marcus Vinicius D'Almeida (BRA)	7	29	30	28	28

Quarter-finals
3	Jack Williams (USA)	5^{9}	28	29	28	28	28
11	Bernardo Oliveira (BRA)	6^{10}	25	29	25	29	29
10	Adrián Puentes (CUB)	0	26	27	28
2	Marcus Vinicius D'Almeida (BRA)	6	30	29	29

Semifinals
11	Bernardo Oliveira (BRA)	3	28	25	27	28	25
2	Marcus Vinicius D'Almeida (BRA)	7	27	29	27	29	28
