= Archery at the 2019 Pan American Games – Men's team recurve =

Men's team recurve at the 2019 Pan American Games
- Venue: Villa Maria de Triunfo
- Dates: August 7–11
- Competitors: 24 from 8 nations

Medalists
Gold medal	Crispin Duenas; Brian Maxwell; Eric Peters; Canada
Silver medal	Andres Aguilar Gimpel; Juan Painevil; Ricardo Soto; Chile
Bronze medal	Brady Ellison; Thomas Stanwood; Jack Williams; United States

The men's team recurve competition of the archery events at the 2019 Pan American Games was held from 7 August to 11 August at the Archery field at the Villa Maria de Triunfo in Lima, Peru.

== Schedule ==
Date	Time	Round
August 7, 2019	8:30	Ranking round
August 7, 2019	14:30	Quarterfinals
August 7, 2019	15:00	Semifinals
August 11, 2019	10:32	Finals

== Results ==
=== Ranking round ===
The results were as follows:

Rank	Nation	Archers	Score	Total	Notes
1	United States	Brady Ellison; Thomas Stanwood; Jack Williams	702; 666; 689	2057	PR
2	Brazil	Marcelo Costa; Marcus Vinicius D'Almeida; Bernardo Oliveira	651; 692; 659	2002	
3	Mexico	Ángel Alvarado; Luis Álvarez; Ernesto Boardman	672; 672; 639	1983	
4	Canada	Crispin Duenas; Brian Maxwell; Eric Peters	681; 638; 661	1980	
5	Cuba	Hugo Franco; Adrián Puentes; Juan Carlos Stevens	658; 659; 655	1972	
6	Colombia	Daniel Betancur; Andrés Pila; Daniel Pineda	633; 659; 673	1965	
7	Chile	Andres Aguilar Gimpel; Juan Painevil; Ricardo Soto	656; 624; 652	1932	
8	Guatemala	Diego Castro Rojas; Thomas Flossbach; José López Palacios	648; 649; 605	1902	

=== Elimination rounds ===
The results were as follows:

Quarterfinals
1	United States	6	58	58	58
8	Guatemala	0	50	50	55
5	Cuba	2	52	54	52	53
4	Canada	6	53	49	56	54
3	Mexico	5	54	56	52	55	26
6	Colombia	4	55	53	55	52	26
7	Chile	5	58	56	52	56	28
2	Brazil	4	59	52	57	55	28

Semifinals
1	United States	1	56	59	54
4	Canada	5	58	59	57
3	Mexico	0	52	53	53
7	Chile	6	56	55	54

Final
4	Canada	5	53	54	54	53	27
7	Chile	4	51	53	55	55	24
Bronze medal match
1	United States	5	52	54	56	52
3	Mexico	3	51	54	56	52
