= Archery at the 2023 Pan American Games – Men's team recurve =

Men's team recurve at the 2023 Pan American Games
- Venue: Archery Center
- Dates: November 1, November 4
- Competitors: 24 from 8 nations

Medalists
Gold medal	Brady Ellison; Jackson Mirich; Jack Williams	United States
Silver medal	Carlos Rojas; Matías Grande; Caleb Urbina	Mexico
Bronze medal	Marcus D'Almeida; Matheus Gomes; Matheus Ely	Brazil

The men's team recurve competition of the archery events at the 2023 Pan American Games was held on November 1 and 4 at the Archery Center in Santiago, Chile.

== Schedule ==
Date	Time	Round
November 1, 2023	09:00	Ranking Round
November 1, 2023	11:20	Quarterfinals
November 1, 2023	09:30	Semifinals
November 4, 2023	11:15	Final

== Results ==
=== Ranking round ===
The results were as follows:

Rank	Archer	Nation	Score	Note
1	Brady Ellison; Jackson Mirich; Jack Williams	United States	2034	
2	Santiago Arcila; Daniel Betancur; Jorge Enríquez	Colombia	2013	
3	Carlos Rojas; Matías Grande; Caleb Urbina	Mexico	2005	
4	Marcus D'Almeida; Matheus Gomes; Matheus Ely	Brazil	2001	
5	Crispin Duenas; Eric Peters; Brandon Xuereb	Canada	1990	
6	Hugo Franco; Juan Santiesteban; Javier Vega	Cuba	1973	
7	Andrés Aguilar; Andrés Gallardo; Ricardo Soto	Chile	1961	
8	Diego Castro; Thomas Flossbach; Marco López	Independent Athletes Team	1908	

=== Elimination rounds ===
The results were as follows:

Quarterfinals
1	United States	57	59	56
8	Independent Athletes Team	56	50	55
5	Canada	57	56	55
4	Brazil	57	58	58
3	Mexico	54	56	54	58
6	Cuba	53	50	57	53
7	Chile	54	55	53	54
2	Colombia	55	50	53	57

Semifinals
1	United States	55	58	58	59
4	Brazil	56	56	57	54
3	Mexico	56	58	56	53
2	Colombia	55	56	57	53

Final
1	United States	58	52	58	57
3	Mexico	56	54	56	54
Bronze medal match
4	Brazil	56	53	56	56
2	Colombia	54	56	52	56
