= Archery at the 2019 Pan American Games – Mixed team recurve =

Mixed team recurve at the 2019 Pan American Games
- Venue: Villa Maria de Triunfo
- Dates: August 7–11
- Competitors: 24 from 12 nations

Medalists
Gold medal	Brady Ellison; Casey Kaufhold; United States
Silver medal	Ana Rendón; Daniel Pineda; Colombia
Bronze medal	Alejandra Valencia; Ángel Alvarado; Mexico

The mixed team recurve competition of the archery events at the 2019 Pan American Games was held from 7 August to 11 August at the Archery field at the Villa Maria de Triunfo in Lima, Peru.

== Schedule ==
Date	Time	Round
August 7, 2019	8:30	Ranking round
August 10, 2019	9:00	1/8 elimination
August 10, 2019	9:30	Quarterfinals
August 10, 2019	10:00	Semifinals
August 11, 2019	9:00	Finals

== Results ==
=== Ranking round ===
The results were as follows:

Rank	Nation	Archer	Score	Notes
1	United States	Casey Kaufhold; Brady Ellison	1364	PR
2	Mexico	Alejandra Valencia; Ángel Alvarado	1347	
3	Colombia	Ana Rendón; Daniel Pineda	1325	
4	Canada	Stephanie Barrett; Crispin Duenas	1322	
5	Brazil	Ane Marcelle dos Santos; Marcus Vinicius D'Almeida	1321	
6	Cuba	Elizabeth Rodriguez; Adrián Puentes	1294	
7	Argentina	Florencia Leithold; Mario Jajarabilla	1286	
8	Chile	Isabella Bassi; Andres Aguilar Gimpel	1285	
9	Peru	Pamela Velasquez; Willian O'Brien	1269	
10	Venezuela	Mayra Méndez; Elías Malavé	1268	
11	Guatemala	Cinthya Pellecer; Thomas Flossbach	1244	
12	El Salvador	Marcela Cortez; Oscar Guillén	1216	

=== Elimination rounds ===
The results were as follows:

Round of 16
1
16
9	Pamela Velasquez (PER); Willian O'Brien (PER)	0	33	30	33
8	Isabella Bassi (CHI); Andres Aguilar Gimpel (CHI)	6	34	37	35
5	Ane Marcelle dos Santos (BRA); Marcus Vinicius D'Almeida (BRA)	2	35	36	36	36
12	Marcela Cortez (ESA); Oscar Guillén (ESA)	6	37	33	37	37
4
13
6
11
11	Cinthya Pellecer (GUA); Thomas Flossbach (GUA)	1	33	35	33
6	Elizabeth Rodriguez (CUB); Adrián Puentes (CUB)	5	35	35	36
7	Florencia Leithold (ARG); Mario Jajarabilla (ARG)	5	33	38	38
10	Mayra Méndez (VEN); Elías Malavé (VEN)	1	33	36	34
2
15

Quarterfinals
1	Brady Ellison (USA); Casey Kaufhold (USA)	6	37	38	38
8	Isabella Bassi (CHI); Andres Aguilar Gimpel (CHI)	0	36	36	36
12	Marcela Cortez (ESA); Oscar Guillén (ESA)	3	35	38	34	37
4	Stephanie Barrett (CAN); Crispin Duenas (CAN)	5	37	36	36	37
3	Ana Rendón (COL); Daniel Pineda (COL)	5	37	33	34	36	19
6	Elizabeth Rodriguez (CUB); Adrián Puentes (CUB)	1	33	38	32	39	17
7	Florencia Leithold (ARG); Mario Jajarabilla (ARG)	0	31	35	37
2	Alejandra Valencia (MEX); Ángel Alvarado (MEX)	6	36	36	40

Semifinals
1	Brady Ellison (USA); Casey Kaufhold (USA)	6	39	35	39	38
4	Stephanie Barrett (CAN); Crispin Duenas (CAN)	2	36	36	36	37
3	Ana Rendón (COL); Daniel Pineda (COL)	5	36	35	37	32	20
2	Alejandra Valencia (MEX); Ángel Alvarado (MEX)	4	34	38	36	34	19

Final
1	Brady Ellison (USA); Casey Kaufhold (USA)	5	37	38	35	38
3	Ana Rendón (COL); Daniel Pineda (COL)	3	39	31	35	32
Bronze medal match
4	Stephanie Barrett (CAN); Crispin Duenas (CAN)	3	36	37	34	35
2	Alejandra Valencia (MEX); Ángel Alvarado (MEX)	5	32	37	37	36
