= Archery at the 2023 Pan American Games – Men's individual recurve =

Men's individual recurve at the 2023 Pan American Games
- Venue: Archery Center
- Dates: November 1 – November 5
- Competitors: 33 from 16 nations

Medalists
| Gold medal | Jackson Mirich | United States |
| Silver medal | Matías Grande | Mexico |
| Bronze medal | Ricardo Soto | Chile |

The men's individual recurve competition of the archery events at the 2023 Pan American Games was held from November 1 to 5 at the Archery Center in Santiago, Chile.

== Schedule ==
| Date | Time | Round |
|---|---|---|
| November 1, 2023 | 09:00 | Ranking Round |
| November 2, 2023 | 09:20 | Round of 32 |
| November 2, 2023 | 09:55 | Round of 16 |
| November 3, 2023 | 11:56 | Quarterfinals |
| November 5, 2023 | 10:06 | Semifinals |
| November 5, 2023 | 11:06 | Final |

== Results ==
=== Ranking round ===
The results were as follows:

| Rank | Archer | Nation | Score | Note |
|---|---|---|---|---|
| 1 | Marcus D'Almeida | Brazil | 689 | |
| 2 | Brady Ellison | United States | 685 | |
| 3 | Matías Grande | Mexico | 684 | |
| 4 | Jorge Enríquez | Colombia | 681 | |
| 5 | Jack Williams | United States | 678 | |
| 6 | Eric Peters | Canada | 675 | |
| 7 | Carlos Rojas | Mexico | 673 | |
| 8 | Santiago Arcila | Colombia | 672 | |
| 9 | Jackson Mirich | United States | 671 | |
| 10 | Crispin Duenas | Canada | 667 | |
| 11 | Juan Santiesteban | Cuba | 663 | |
| 12 | Oscar Ticas | El Salvador | 661 | |
| 13 | Ricardo Soto | Chile | 661 | |
| 14 | Daniel Betancur | Colombia | 660 | |
| 15 | Matheus Ely | Brazil | 659 | |
| 16 | Thomas Flossbach | Independent Athletes Team | 658 | |
| 17 | Javier Vega | Cuba | 657 | |
| 18 | Hugo Franco | Cuba | 653 | |
| 19 | Matheus Gomes | Brazil | 653 | |
| 20 | Andrés Gallardo | Chile | 652 | |
| 21 | Nicholas D'Amour | Virgin Islands | 652 | |
| 22 | Damian Jajarabilla | Argentina | 651 | |
| 23 | Brandon Xuereb | Canada | 648 | |
| 24 | Andrés Aguilar | Chile | 648 | |
| 25 | Caleb Urbina | Mexico | 648 | |
| 26 | Diego Castro | Independent Athletes Team | 628 | |
| 27 | Marco López | Independent Athletes Team | 622 | |
| 28 | Daniel Velarde | Peru | 617 | |
| 29 | Devin Permaul | Guyana | 611 | |
| 30 | Victor Palacio | Venezuela | 609 | |
| 31 | Adrián Muñoz | Puerto Rico | 602 | |
| 32 | Lester Ortegón | Ecuador | 597 | |

=== Competition rounds ===
The results during the elimination rounds and final rounds were as follows:

==== Finals ====
Semifinals
3 | J Mirich (USA) | 1 | 2 | 2 | 1
13 | R Soto (CHI) | 1 | 0 | 0 | 1
3 | M Grande (MEX) | 1 | 0 | 1 | 2 | 2
2 | B Ellison (USA) | 1 | 2 | 1 | 0 | 0

Finals
9 | J Mirich (USA) | 1 | 1 | 2 | 0 | 2
3 | M Grande (MEX) | 1 | 1 | 0 | 2 | 0
Third place
13 | R Soto (CHI) | 2 | 0 | 1 | 2 | 1
2 | B Ellison (USA) | 0 | 2 | 1 | 0 | 1

==== Top half ====
Round of 32
1 | M D'Almeida (BRA) | 2 | 2 | 2
32 | L Ortegón (ECU) | 0 | 0 | 0
17 | J Vega (CUB) | 2 | 2 | 2
16 | T Flossbach (EAI) | 0 | 0 | 0
9 | J Mirich (USA) | 2 | 2 | 0 | 2
24 | A Aguilar (CHI) | 0 | 0 | 2 | 0
25 | C Urbina (MEX) | 1 | 0 | 2 | 0 | 0
8 | S Arcila (COL) | 1 | 2 | 0 | 2 | 2
5 | J Williams (USA) | 2 | 2 | 0 | 2
28 | D Velarde (PER) | 0 | 0 | 2 | 0
21 | N D'Amour (ISV) | 2 | 2 | 0 | 1 | 0 | 0
12 | O Ticas (ESA) | 0 | 0 | 2 | 1 | 2 | 1
13 | R Soto (CHI) | 2 | 2 | 2
20 | A Gallardo (CHI) | 0 | 0 | 0
29 | D Permaul (GUY) | 0 | 0 | 0
4 | J Enríquez (COL) | 2 | 2 | 2

Round of 16
1 | M D'Almeida (BRA) | 1 | 2 | 2 | 0 | 0 | 0
17 | J Vega (CUB) | 1 | 0 | 0 | 2 | 2 | 1
9 | J Mirich (USA) | 2 | 2 | 2
8 | S Arcila (COL) | 0 | 0 | 0
5 | J Williams (USA) | 2 | 2 | 0 | 2
12 | O Ticas (ESA) | 0 | 0 | 1 | 2 | 0
13 | R Soto (CHI) | 1 | 1 | 1 | 2 | 2
4 | J Enríquez (COL) | 1 | 1 | 1 | 0 | 0

Quarterfinals
17 | J Vega (CUB) | 0 | 0 | 0
9 | J Mirich (USA) | 2 | 2 | 2
5 | J Williams (USA) | 0 | 1 | 0 | 1
13 | R Soto (CHI) | 2 | 1 | 2 | 1

Semifinals
9 | J Mirich (USA) | 1 | 2 | 2 | 1
13 | R Soto (CHI) | 1 | 0 | 0 | 1

==== Bottom half ====
Round of 32
3 | M Grande (MEX) | 2 | 2 | 0 | 2
30 | V Palacio (VEN) | 0 | 0 | 2 | 0
19 | M Gomes (BRA) | 0 | 0 | 2 | 1 | 0
14 | D Betancur (COL) | 2 | 2 | 0 | 1 | 2
11 | J Santiesteban (CUB) | 2 | 1 | 2 | 0 | 2
22 | D Jajarabilla (ARG) | 0 | 1 | 0 | 2 | 0
27 | M López (EAI) | 0 | 1 | 2 | 2 | 0 | 0
6 | E Peters (CAN) | 2 | 1 | 0 | 0 | 2 | 1
7 | C Rojas (MEX) | 2 | 0 | 2 | 0 | 2
26 | D Castro (EAI) | 0 | 2 | 0 | 2 | 0
23 | B Xuereb (CAN) | 2 | 0 | 0 | 0
10 | C Duenas (CAN) | 0 | 2 | 2 | 2
15 | M Ely (BRA) | 0 | 2 | 0 | 0
18 | H Franco (CUB) | 2 | 0 | 2 | 2
31 | A Muñoz (PUR) | 0 | 0 | 0
2 | B Ellison (USA) | 2 | 2 | 2

Round of 16
3 | M Grande (MEX) | 2 | 1 | 2 | 2
14 | D Betancur (COL) | 0 | 1 | 0 | 0
11 | J Santiesteban (CUB) | 0 | 2 | 2 | 2
6 | E Peters (CAN) | 2 | 0 | 0 | 0
7 | C Rojas (MEX) | 2 | 2 | 2
10 | C Duenas (CAN) | 0 | 0 | 0
18 | H Franco (CUB) | 0 | 1 | 0 | 0
2 | B Ellison (USA) | 2 | 1 | 2 | 2

Quarterfinals
3 | M Grande (MEX) | 2 | 2 | 0 | 2
11 | J Santiesteban (CUB) | 0 | 0 | 2 | 0
7 | C Rojas (MEX) | 0 | 0 | 2 | 2 | 1 | 0
2 | B Ellison (USA) | 2 | 2 | 0 | 0 | 1 | 1

Semifinals
3 | M Grande (MEX) | 1 | 0 | 1 | 2 | 2
2 | B Ellison (USA) | 1 | 2 | 1 | 0 | 0
