= 2023 World Archery Championships – Men's individual recurve =

Archery competition

The men's individual recurve competition at the 2023 World Archery Championships took place from 1 to 6 August in Berlin, Germany.

== Schedule ==
All times are Central European Summer Time (UTC+02:00).

Date	Time	Round
Tuesday, 1 August	09:30	Qualification round
Thursday, 3 August	09:45; 10:30; 11:15; 11:55	1/48 finals 1/24 finals 1/16 finals 1/8 finals
Sunday, 6 August	14:02; 14:50; 15:19; 15:31	Quarterfinals; Semifinals; Bronze medal match Final

== Qualification round ==
Results after 72 arrows.

Rank	Name	Nation	Score	10+X	X
1	Kim Woo-jin	South Korea	688	46	18
2	Dhiraj Bommadevara	India	683	42	14
3	Marcus D'Almeida	Brazil	682	44	18
4	Lee Woo-seok	South Korea	682	18	6
5	Steve Wijler	Netherlands	678	37	11
6	Kim Je-deok	South Korea	678	34	14
7	Brady Ellison	United States	672	35	14
8	Qi Xiangshuo	China	671	31	7
9	Tang Chih-chun	Chinese Taipei	669	32	11
10	Mete Gazoz	Turkey	669	31	7
11	Pablo Acha	Spain	669	28	8
12	Li Zhongyuan	China	666	34	13
13	Florian Unruh	Germany	666	27	8
14	Mauro Nespoli	Italy	664	32	11
15	Baptiste Addis	France	664	29	11
16	Su Yu-yang	Chinese Taipei	663	32	12
17	Ulaş Berkim Tümer	Turkey	663	30	11
18	Nguyễn Duy	Vietnam	662	33	10
19	Hugo Franco	Cuba	661	31	11
20	Jean-Charles Valladont	France	661	27	6
21	Takaharu Furukawa	Japan	660	28	10
22	Federico Musolesi	Italy	660	27	9
23	Moritz Wieser	Germany	660	26	11
24	Fumiya Saito	Japan	659	30	10
25	Jackson Mirich	United States	659	30	9
26	Crispin Duenas	Canada	659	29	6
27	Ilfat Abdullin	Kazakhstan	659	28	3
28	Alen Remar	Croatia	659	27	6
29	Maximilian Weckmüller	Germany	658	28	12
30	Senna Roos	Netherlands	658	27	8
31	Ram Krishna Saha	Bangladesh	658	24	11
32	Ryan Tyack	Australia	657	25	10
33	Dorjsürengiin Dashnamjil	Mongolia	657	24	5
34	Peter Boukouvalas	Australia	656	30	11
35	Žiga Ravnikar	Slovenia	656	30	11
36	Eric Peters	Canada	656	28	9
37	Keziah Chabin	Switzerland	656	26	9
38	Mihajlo Stefanović	Serbia	656	26	7
39	Jorge Enríquez	Colombia	655	26	7
40	Gijs Broeksma	Netherlands	656	24	10
41	Alviyanto Prastyadi	Indonesia	656	24	9
42	Carlos Rojas	Mexico	656	22	4
43	Deevang Gupta	Canada	656	14	4
44	Riau Ega Agatha	Indonesia	655	26	11
45	Dauletkeldi Zhangbyrbay	Kazakhstan	655	15	5
46	Caleb Urbina	Mexico	654	19	2
47	James Woodgate	Great Britain	652	29	13
48	Jack Williams	United States	652	27	10
49	Arif Dwi Pangestu	Indonesia	652	27	8
50	Ricardo Soto	Chile	652	27	7
51	Wang Dapeng	China	652	23	4
52	Roy Dror	Israel	651	31	8
53	Nuno Carneiro	Portugal	651	27	9
54	Baatarkhuyagiin Otgonbold	Mongolia	651	22	8
55	Tushar Prabhakar Shelke	India	650	24	21
56	Monty Orton	Great Britain	650	23	10
57	Tai Yu-hsuan	Chinese Taipei	650	20	8
58	Junya Nakanishi	Japan	649	27	6
59	Khairul Anuar Mohamad	Malaysia	649	21	4
60	Nicolas Bernardi	France	649	18	7
61	Antti Vikström	Finland	648	22	5
62	Jai Crawley	Australia	647	20	7
63	Andrés Aguilar	Chile	646	28	8
64	Niv Frenkel	Israel	646	25	6
65	Nicholas D'Amour	United States Virgin Islands	646	23	9
66	Dan Habjan Malavasić	Slovenia	646	23	5
67	Muhamad Zarif Syahiir Zolkepeli	Malaysia	646	20	6
68	Temur Makievi	Georgia	645	26	10
69	Ivan Kozhokar	Ukraine	645	25	6
70	Mátyás László Balogh	Hungary	645	22	9
70	Li Yue Long	Singapore	645	21	7
72	Kacper Sierakowski	Poland	645	20	7
73	Muhammed Abdullah Yıldırmış	Turkey	644	23	7
74	Andrés Temiño	Spain	644	21	7
75	Mohammad Hakim Ahmed Rubel	Bangladesh	644	18	10
76	Oleksii Hunbin	Ukraine	644	16	4
77	Kaj Sjöberg	Sweden	643	25	8
78	Sanzhar Mussayev	Kazakhstan	643	19	4
79	Alessandro Paoli	Italy	641	17	6
80	Dāvis Blāze	Latvia	641	11	2
81	Thomas Rufer	Switzerland	640	27	8
82	Matheus Zwick Ely	Brazil	640	20	9
83	Mrinal Chauhan	India	640	17	6
84	Lovro Černi	Croatia	639	24	13
85	Oskar Kasprowski	Poland	639	23	8
86	Josef Křesala	Czech Republic	639	22	7
87	Pit Klein	Luxembourg	639	19	4
88	Jeff Henckels	Luxembourg	639	18	4
89	Jarno De Smedt	Belgium	639	15	6
90	Florian Faber	Switzerland	638	22	4
91	Antti Tekoniemi	Finland	637	22	7
92	Muhammad Syafiq Busthamin	Malaysia	637	19	5
93	Andreas Gstöttner	Austria	636	21	6
94	Miha Rožič	Slovenia	635	22	8
95	Théo Carbonetti	Belgium	635	19	9
96	Itay Shanny	Israel	635	18	5
97	Artem Ovchynnikov	Ukraine	635	15	5
98	Miroslav Duchoň	Slovakia	634	21	7
99	Tanapat Pathairat	Thailand	634	18	2
100	Christian Christensen	Denmark	633	24	9
101	Matheus Gomes	Brazil	632	21	8
102	Sajeev De Silva	Sri Lanka	632	17	10
103	Óscar Ticas	El Salvador	632	13	4
104	Luís Gonçalves	Portugal	632	11	3
105	Modestas Šliauteris	Lithuania	631	23	7
106	Ivan Banchev	Bulgaria	631	18	6
107	Romans Sergejevs	Latvia	630	19	6
108	Alex Wise	Great Britain	630	18	4
109	Märt Oona	Estonia	630	16	3
110	Oliver Staudt	Denmark	629	18	7
111	Lê Quốc Phong	Vietnam	628	20	6
112	Vasil Shahnazaryan	Armenia	628	18	5
113	Md Sagor Islam	Bangladesh	628	13	7
114	Jantsangiin Gantögs	Mongolia	627	17	8
115	Juraj Duchoň	Slovakia	626	20	5
116	Matías Grande	Mexico	626	17	2
117	Adam Li	Czech Republic	625	18	1
118	Bahaaeldin Aly	Egypt	624	18	8
119	Daniel Medveczky	Slovakia	624	18	5
120	Charalambos Charalambous	Cyprus	623	20	7
121	Mansour Alwi	Saudi Arabia	623	19	6
122	Mario Țîmpu	Romania	623	18	8
123	Dalius Mačernius	Lithuania	623	18	1
124	Dragisa Jevtić	Serbia	622	16	5
125	Youssouf Tolba	Egypt	621	19	9
126	Andrés Gallardo	Chile	621	19	4
127	Miguel Alvariño	Spain	619	21	8
128	Elian Van Steen	Belgium	619	17	5
129	Lester Ortegón	Ecuador	619	14	4
130	Aly Abdelar	Egypt	618	19	9
131	Phonthakorn Chaisilp	Thailand	617	16	5
132	Jaba Moseshvili	Georgia	614	19	3
133	Jerome Ansel	Luxembourg	611	19	4
134	Caleb Tong	Hong Kong	610	17	9
135	Israel Madaye	Chad	610	16	2
136	Witthaya Thamwong	Thailand	609	17	6
137	Ludvig Henriksen	Denmark	607	14	4
138	Mahammadali Aliyev	Azerbaijan	607	8	3
139	Rashed Alsubaie	Saudi Arabia	607	8	3
140	Jouni Aartola	Finland	604	14	3
141	Andrey Hovhannisyan	Armenia	604	12	4
142	Hamlet Poghosyan	Armenia	602	14	1
143	Abdulla Al-Ketbi	United Arab Emirates	601	12	2
144	Mike Gerard	United States Virgin Islands	600	16	5
145	Tanel Kaasik	Estonia	600	12	2
146	Hoàng Văn Lộc	Vietnam	599	14	4
147	Paweł Ceklarz	Poland	599	12	4
148	Wan Chun Kit	Hong Kong	598	14	5
149	Abdulrahman Al-Musa	Saudi Arabia	598	12	5
150	Aleksandre Machavariani	Georgia	596	10	4
151	Franck Eyeni	Ivory Coast	595	18	5
152	Michal Hlahůlek	Czech Republic	593	11	4
153	Lau Chun Hei	Hong Kong	585	14	8
154	Marko Vulić	Serbia	580	11	3
155	Tamas Moreh	Romania	580	10	3
156	Alexander Mendoza	Bolivia	570	8	1
157	Hans Petur Højgaard	Faroe Islands	569	11	6
158	Leonardo Tura	San Marino	569	11	5
159	Wasim Nayef	Palestine	567	9	0
160	Hendrik Õun	Estonia	564	9	3
161	Emilis Tamulionis	Lithuania	561	7	1
162	Koffi Morokant	Ivory Coast	541	5	1
163	Dagur Örn Fannarsson	Iceland	530	6	1
164	Gnagne N'Dri	Ivory Coast	517	9	3
165	Bruce Arnold	United States Virgin Islands	494	2	1
166	Oliver Ormar Ingvarsson	Iceland	438	9	4
167	Toms Ābelis	Latvia	403	4	0

== Final round ==
Quarterfinals
49	(Indonesia) Arif Dwi Pangestu	6^{10}	25	28	26	27	30
24	(Japan) Fumiya Saito	5^{9}	25	27	27	28	29
5	(Netherlands) Steve Wijler	4	17	27	28	26	27
36	(Canada) Eric Peters	6	27	26	26	28	28
3	(Brazil) Marcus D'Almeida	6	29	30	28
6	(South Korea) Kim Je-deok	0	28	29	27
10	(Turkey) Mete Gazoz	6	30	27	22	29
50	(Chile) Ricardo Soto	2	24	26	27	26

Semifinals
49	(Indonesia) Arif Dwi Pangestu	4	25	27	28	29	24
36	(Canada) Eric Peters	6	26	28	26	28	29
3	(Brazil) Marcus D'Almeida	3	28	29	28	27	28
10	(Turkey) Mete Gazoz	7	28	29	28	28	29

Finals
36	(Canada) Eric Peters	4	28	28	24	30	28
10	(Turkey) Mete Gazoz	6	27	30	28	28	29
Third place
49	(Indonesia) Arif Dwi Pangestu	4	26	29	27	28	29
3	(Brazil) Marcus D'Almeida	6	25	29	28	30	29

== Elimination round ==
=== Section 1 ===
1/48 finals
1	(South Korea) Kim W-j
Bye
33	(Mongolia) D Dorjsürengiin	6	27	27	24	28
80	(Latvia) D Blāze	2	22	20	25	15
81	(Switzerland) T Rufer	0	25	24	25
32	(Australia) R Tyack	6	27	26	27
17	(Turkey) UB Tümer	6	29	27	27
96	(Israel) I Shanny	0	27	21	25
65	(United States Virgin Islands) N D'Amour	6	28	29	28	27
48	(United States) J Williams	2	29	26	26	26
49	(Indonesia) AD Pangestu	6	28	28	24
64	(Israel) N Frenkel	0	26	25	23
97	(Ukraine) A Ovchynnikov	4	27	25	26	25	23
16	(Chinese Taipei) Su Y-y	6	28	25	23	25	27

1/24 finals
1	(South Korea) Kim W-j
Bye
33	(Mongolia) D Dorjsürengiin	3	24	28	25	22	22
32	(Australia) R Tyack	7	24	26	28	27	27
17	(Turkey) UB Tümer	7	25	25	26	24	27
65	(United States Virgin Islands) N D'Amour	3	20	26	25	24	23
49	(Indonesia) AD Pangestu	7	27	28	27	25	27
16	(Chinese Taipei) Su Y-y	3	27	27	22	26	20

1/16 finals
1	(South Korea) Kim W-j	6^{9+}	23	28	27	29	26
32	(Australia) R Tyack	5^{9}	28	25	27	25	27
17	(Turkey) UB Tümer	2	27	27	24	24
49	(Indonesia) AD Pangestu	6	24	28	27	25

1/8 finals
1	(South Korea) Kim W-j	5^{9}	27	22	24	26	25
49	(Indonesia) AD Pangestu	6^{10}	24	26	24	27	23

=== Section 2 ===
1/48 finals
9	(Chinese Taipei) Tang C-c	6	29	23	27	26	28
104	(Portugal) L Gonçalves	4	29	24	27	23	24
57	(Chinese Taipei) Tai Y-h	6	26	23	27	26
56	(United Kingdom) M Orton	2	28	20	25	23
41	(Indonesia) A Prastyadi	6^{10}	25	21	25	24	29
72	(Poland) K Sierakowski	5^{8}	25	23	21	26	28
89	(Belgium) J De Smedt	2	22	28	26	28
24	(Japan) F Saito	6	25	29	23	29
25	(United States) J Mirich	7	29	25	27	27	26
88	(Luxembourg) J Henckels	3	28	26	25	27	21
73	(Turkey) MA Yıldırmış	6	26	21	28	25	27
40	(Netherlands) G Broeksma	4	24	23	26	27	26
Bye
15	(China) Qi XS

1/24 finals
9	(Chinese Taipei) Tang C-c	7	27	26	28	26
57	(Chinese Taipei) Tai Y-h	1	26	24	28	23
41	(Indonesia) A Prastyadi	2	22	29	23	25
24	(Japan) F Saito	6	26	25	26	28
25	(United States) J Mirich	0	27	25	18
73	(Turkey) MA Yıldırmış	6	28	26	28
Bye
8	(China) Qi XS

1/16 finals
9	(Chinese Taipei) Tang C-c	1	23	25	26	24
24	(Japan) F Saito	7	27	25	27	27
73	(Turkey) MA Yıldırmış	0	20	26	27
8	(China) Qi XS	6	25	28	29

1/8 finals
24	(Japan) F Saito	6	23	26	26
8	(China) Qi XS	0	22	23	21

=== Section 3 ===
1/48 finals
5	(Netherlands) S Wijler
Bye
37	(Switzerland) K Chabin	6^{7}	25	27	22	28	26
76	(Ukraine) O Hunbin	5^{4}	27	25	27	28	22
85	(Poland) O Kasprowski	6^{9}	24	24	25	25	27
28	(Croatia) A Remar	5^{7}	27	23	27	24	27
21	(Japan) T Furukawa	6	27	25	25	27	24
92	(Malaysia) MS Busthamin	4	27	21	26	21	24
69	(Ukraine) I Kozhokar	3	28	27	26	22	27
44	(Indonesia) REA Salsabila	7	28	26	27	27	29
53	(Portugal) N Carneiro	0	23	20	24
60	(France) N Bernardi	6	26	26	27
101	(Brazil) M Gomes	0	24	24	26
12	(China) Li ZY	6	27	28	27

1/24 finals
5	(Netherlands) S Wijler
Bye
37	(Switzerland) K Chabin	3	26	23	26	25	17
85	(Poland) O Kasprowski	7	27	23	22	28	20
21	(Japan) T Furukawa	1	25	24	25	24
44	(Indonesia) REA Salsabila	7	25	28	28	26
60	(France) N Bernardi	6	26	25	28	24	26
12	(China) Li ZY	4	27	24	27	25	23

1/16 finals
5	(Netherlands) S Wijler	7	24	29	26	28	25
85	(Poland) O Kasprowski	3	25	26	24	28	24
44	(Indonesia) REA Salsabila	3	25	23	27	24	26
60	(France) N Bernardi	7	25	24	24	27	27

1/8 finals
5	(Netherlands) S Wijler	6^{9+}	26	21	25	24	25
60	(France) N Bernardi	5^{9}	26	26	19	28	22

=== Section 4 ===
1/48 finals
13	(Germany) F Unruh	6	29	28	28
100	(Denmark) CB Christensen	0	26	20	26
61	(Finland) A Vikström	4	26	24	27	25	24
52	(Israel) R Dror	6	27	27	26	25	24
45	(Kazakhstan) D Zhangbyrbay	1	24	26	26	22
68	(Georgia (country)) T Makievi	7	27	28	26	23
93	(Austria) A Gstöttner	5^{7}	25	25	27	21	28
20	(France) JC Valladont	6^{9}	27	25	25	22	23
29	(Germany) M Weckmüller	7	23	28	27	24	28
84	(Croatia) L Černi	3	23	23	22	26	24
77	(Sweden) K Sjöberg	0	26	18	28
36	(Canada) E Peters	6	28	25	29
Bye
15	(South Korea) Lee W-s

1/24 finals
13	(Germany) F Unruh	6	28	27	27	27
52	(Israel) R Dror	2	23	28	25	26
68	(Georgia (country)) T Makievi	6	24	26	27
20	(France) JC Valladont	0	19	25	23
29	(Germany) M Weckmüller	2	30	27	22	26
36	(Canada) E Peters	6	26	29	24	29
Bye
4	(South Korea) Lee W-s

1/16 finals
13	(Germany) F Unruh	7	24	26	27	30	29
68	(Georgia (country)) T Makievi	3	25	26	24	23	26
36	(Canada) E Peters	7	26	29	28	29	27
4	(South Korea) Lee W-s	3	27	28	25	29	26

1/8 finals
13	(Germany) F Unruh	4	26	25	25	28	21
36	(Canada) E Peters	6	26	27	19	28	29

=== Section 5 ===
1/48 finals
3	(Brazil) M D'Almeida
Bye
35	(Slovenia) Ž Ravnikar	6	28	25	24	27	23
78	(Kazakhstan) S Mussayev	4	26	28	27	23	21
83	(India) M Chauhan	4	28	23	27	27	24
30	(Netherlands) S Roos	6	25	29	28	19	25
19	(Cuba) H Franco	6^{8+}	25	28	24	24	27
94	(Slovenia) M Rožič	5^{8}	26	23	24	29	25
67	(Malaysia) MZS Zolkepeli	1	26	23	25	23
46	(Mexico) C Urbina	7	28	23	27	26
51	(China) Wang DP	4	28	24	25	26	22
62	(Australia) J Crawley	6	29	21	27	21	27
99	(Thailand) T Pathairat	1	24	16	28	22
14	(Italy) M Nespoli	7	26	24	28	28

1/24 finals
3	(Brazil) M D'Almeida
Bye
35	(Slovenia) Ž Ravnikar	1	26	27	23	27
30	(Netherlands) S Roos	7	27	27	24	28
19	(Cuba) H Franco	0	22	26	26
46	(Mexico) C Urbina	6	24	29	27
62	(Australia) J Crawley	0	23	22	22
14	(Italy) M Nespoli	6	24	23	24

1/16 finals
3	(Brazil) M D'Almeida	7	23	28	27	28
30	(Netherlands) S Roos	1	23	26	25	25
46	(Mexico) C Urbina	0	23	23	26
14	(Italy) M Nespoli	6	24	29	27

1/8 finals
3	(Brazil) M D'Almeida	7	28	25	28	28
14	(Italy) M Nespoli	1	24	25	24	23

=== Section 6 ===
1/48 finals
11	(Spain) P Acha	6^{8}	24	21	28	26	27
102	(Sri Lanka) S De Silva	5^{6}	26	26	28	17	24
59	(Malaysia) KA Mohamad	4	27	23	28	25	25
54	(Mongolia) O Baatarkhuyagiin	6	28	25	23	24	27
43	(Canada) D Gupta	6	28	27	28
70	(Hungary) M Balogh	0	25	23	25
91	(Finland) A Tekoniemi	6^{8,8}	26	26	29	24	26
22	(Italy) F Musolesi	5^{8,5}	28	25	28	27	26
27	(Kazakhstan) I Abdullin	4	26	20	27	20	24
86	(Czech Republic) J Křesala	6	23	25	25	27	25
75	(Bangladesh) MHA Rubel	6^{7+}	29	21	25	26	26
38	(Serbia) M Stefanović	5^{7}	27	19	26	27	26
Bye
15	(South Korea) Kim J-d

1/24 finals
11	(Spain) P Acha	6	25	26	27
54	(Mongolia) O Baatarkhuyagiin	0	22	25	23
43	(Canada) D Gupta	2	25	23	23	25
91	(Finland) A Tekoniemi	6	26	27	20	26
86	(Czech Republic) J Křesala	2	20	26	22	21
75	(Bangladesh) MHA Rubel	6	28	25	28	26
Bye
6	(South Korea) Kim J-d

1/16 finals
11	(Spain) P Acha	6	26	26	28	25	28
91	(Finland) A Tekoniemi	4	26	20	25	26	28
75	(Bangladesh) MHA Rubel	4	21	24	27	30	26
6	(South Korea) Kim J-d	6	22	29	25	27	27

1/8 finals
11	(Spain) P Acha	2	25	25	20	27
6	(South Korea) Kim J-d	6	28	29	20	27

=== Section 7 ===
1/48 finals
7	(United States) B Ellison
Bye
39	(Colombia) J Enríquez	4	25	26	24	27	23
74	(Spain) A Temiño	6	23	30	29	26	28
87	(Luxembourg) P Klein	2	28	24	25	23
26	(Canada) C Duenas	6	22	25	28	25
23	(Germany) M Wieser	4	26	24	24	28	26
90	(Switzerland) F Faber	6	29	16	28	26	30
71	(Singapore) Li YL	4	28	20	28	24	24
42	(Mexico) C Rojas	6	27	25	27	26	28
55	(India) TP Shelke	6	29	20	25	29	27
58	(Japan) J Nakanishi	4	26	24	28	26	20
103	(El Salvador) Ó Ticas	3	24	21	26	25	21
10	(Turkey) M Gazoz	7	27	22	24	25	30

1/24 finals
7	(United States) B Ellison
Bye
74	(Spain) A Temiño	4	22	28	25	26	23
26	(Canada) C Duenas	6	25	26	27	24	26
90	(Switzerland) F Faber	7	24	27	27	26	21
42	(Mexico) C Rojas	3	20	28	25	26	19
55	(India) TP Shelke	0	24	27	26
10	(Turkey) M Gazoz	6	28	28	29

1/16 finals
7	(United States) B Ellison	6^{9,8+}	24	27	25	28	25
26	(Canada) C Duenas	5^{9,8}	24	26	28	24	26
90	(Switzerland) F Faber	0	22	25	23
10	(Turkey) M Gazoz	6	26	26	29

1/8 finals
7	(United States) B Ellison	0	23	27	26
10	(Turkey) M Gazoz	6	27	28	28

=== Section 8 ===
1/48 finals
15	(France) B Addis	7	27	25	27	29	25
98	(Slovakia) M Duchoň	3	26	25	28	21	24
63	(Chile) A Aguilar	2	27	22	26	22
50	(Chile) R Soto	6	26	26	27	27
47	(United Kingdom) J Woodgate	4	27	23	29	25	26
66	(Slovenia) D Habjan Malavasić	6	29	24	28	23	27
95	(Belgium) T Carbonetti	4	26	19	25	24
15	(Vietnam) Nguyễn D	6	30	25	25	24
31	(Bangladesh) RK Saha	3	28	24	27	25	22
82	(Brazil) M Zwick Ely	7	27	26	28	25	28
79	(Italy) A Paoli	2	26	28	26	24
34	(Australia) P Boukouvalas	6	27	26	27	27
Bye
15	(India) D Bommadevara

1/24 finals
15	(France) B Addis	4	25	25	27	26	13
50	(Chile) R Soto	6	25	25	23	29	22
66	(Slovenia) D Habjan Malavasić	7	23	27	26	28
15	(Vietnam) Nguyễn D	1	21	24	26	26
82	(Brazil) M Zwick Ely	7	26	25	24	25
34	(Australia) P Boukouvalas	1	25	24	24	22
Bye
2	(India) D Bommadevara

1/16 finals
50	(Chile) R Soto	6	23	23	26	27
66	(Slovenia) D Habjan Malavasić	2	14	26	22	25
82	(Brazil) M Zwick Ely	4	25	22	26	25	25
2	(India) D Bommadevara	6	18	24	26	28	25

1/8 finals
50	(Chile) R Soto	6	24	28	23	25	27
2	(India) D Bommadevara	4	26	26	21	28	25
