= Chile at the 2019 Pan American Games =

- IOC code: CHI
- NOC: Chilean Olympic Committee

in Lima, Peru 26 July–11 August 2019
- Competitors: 317 in 34 sports
- Flag bearer (opening): Felipe Miranda
- Flag bearer (closing): Soraya Jadué
- Medals Ranked 8th: Gold 13 Silver 19 Bronze 18 Total 50

Pan American Games appearances (overview)
- 1951; 1955; 1959; 1963; 1967; 1971; 1975; 1979; 1983; 1987; 1991; 1995; 1999; 2003; 2007; 2011; 2015; 2019; 2023; 2027

Chile competed in the 2019 Pan American Games in Lima, Peru from July 26 to August 11, 2019.

On July 1, 2019, water skier Felipe Miranda was named as the country's flag bearer during the opening ceremony.

The Chilean team consisted of 317 athletes.

Santiago hosted the 2023 Pan American Games and a Chilean segment was performed at the closing ceremony.

== Medalists ==
The following Chilean competitors won medals at the games.

Medal	Name	Sport	Event	Date
Gold	Tomás González	Gymnastics	Men's floor	July 30
Gold	Esteban Grimalt; Marco Grimalt	Beach volleyball	Men's tournament	July 30
Gold	María Fernanda Valdés	Weightlifting	Women's -87 kg	July 30
Gold	Alexa Guarachi; Nicolás Jarry	Tennis	Mixed doubles	Aug 3
Gold	Antonio Cabrera; Felipe Peñaloza	Cycling	Men's madison	Aug 4
Gold	Antonia Abraham; Melita Abraham	Rowing	Women's coxless pair	Aug 8
Gold	Gabriel Kehr	Athletics	Men's hammer throw	Aug 8
Gold	Ignacio Abraham; Christopher Kalleg	Rowing	Men's coxless pair	Aug 9
Gold	María José Moya	Roller sports	Women's 300 metres time-trial	Aug 9
Gold	Felipe Cárdenas; Roberto Liewald; Fabián Oyarzún; Felipe Oyarzún	Rowing	Men's lightweight coxless four	Aug 10
Gold	Antonia Abraham; Melita Abraham; Soraya Jadué; Isidora Niemeyer	Rowing	Women's quadruple sculls	Aug 10
Gold	Thomas Briceño	Judo	Men's 100 kg	Aug 11
Gold	Joaquín González	Karate	Men's 60 kg	Aug 11
Silver	Esteban Bustos	Modern pentathlon	Men's individual	July 28
Silver	María Mailliard; Karen Roco	Canoeing	Women's C-2 500 metres	July 29
Silver	Felipe Miranda	Water skiing	Men's jump	July 29
Silver	María Mailliard	Canoeing	Women's C-1 200 metres	July 30
Silver	Rodrigo Miranda	Water skiing	Men's overall	July 30
Silver	Francisca Crovetto	Shooting	Women's skeet	Aug 2
Silver	Tomás Barrios	Tennis	Men's singles	Aug 4
Silver	Daniel Ayala; Felipe Barrientos; Sebastián Ceballos; Victor Donoso; Emil Feuchtmann; Erwin Feuchtmann; Javier Frelijj; Felipe García; Marco Oneto; Elías Oyarzún; Sebastián Pavez; Diego Reyes; Esteban Salinas; Rodrigo Salinas	Handball	Men's tournament	Aug 5
Silver	Gustavo Alarcón	Fencing	Men's foil	Aug 6
Silver	Humberto Mansilla	Athletics	Men's hammer throw	Aug 8
Silver	Yoselyn Cárcamo; Isidora Niemeyer	Rowing	Women's lightweight double sculls	Aug 9
Silver	César Abaroa; Alfredo Abraham; Ignacio Abraham; Selim Echeverría; Christopher Kalleg; Francisco Lapostol; Antonia Liewald; Nelson Martínez; Óscar Vásquez	Rowing	Men's eight	Aug 10
Silver	Hugo Ramírez	Roller sports	Men's 10,000 metres elimination	Aug 10
Silver	Javiera San Martín	Roller sports	Women's 10,000 metres elimination	Aug 10
Silver	Kristel Köbrich	Swimming	Women's 1500 metre freestyle	Aug 10
Silver	Andrés Aguilar; Juan Painevil; Ricardo Soto	Archery	Men's team recurve	Aug 11
Silver	Camilo Velozo	Karate	Men's 67 kg	Aug 11
Silver	Susana Li	Karate	Women's 68 kg	Aug 11
Silver	Macarena Perez Grasset	Cycling	Women's BMX freestyle	Aug 11
Bronze	Martin Vidaurre Kossman	Cycling	Men's cross-country	July 28
Bronze	Giselle Delgado; Ana Pinto	Squash	Women's doubles	July 28
Bronze	Ignacio Morales	Taekwondo	Men's 68 kg	July 28
Bronze	Fernanda Aguirre	Taekwondo	Women's 57 kg	July 28
Bronze	Valentina González	Water skiing	Women's jump	July 29
Bronze	Felipe Peñaloza	Cycling	Men's omnium	Aug 1
Bronze	Antonio Cabrera; Diego Ferreyra; Felipe Peñaloza; José Luis Rodríguez; Pablo Seisdedos	Cycling	Men's team pursuit	Aug 3
Bronze	Carlos Díaz	Athletics	Men's 5000m	Aug 6
Bronze	José Luis Rodríguez	Cycling	Men's road time trial	Aug 7
Bronze	Mary Dee Vargas	Judo	Women's 48 kg	Aug 8
Bronze	Yasmani Acosta	Wrestling	Men's Greco-Roman 130 kg	Aug 8
Bronze	César Abaroa; Eber Sanhueza	Rowing	Men's lightweight double sculls	Aug 9
Bronze	Soraya Jadué	Rowing	Women's single sculls	Aug 9
Bronze	Manuel Domínguez; Esteban Romero	Basque pelota	Men's double trinquete rubber	Aug 9
Bronze	Macarena Figueroa	Bodybuilding	Women's bikini fitness	Aug 10
Bronze	Rodrigo Rojas	Karate	Men's +84 kg	Aug 10
Bronze	Felipe Robles; Andrés Guevara; Paula Herman	Sailing	Lightning	Aug 10
Bronze	Guillermo Pereira	Golf	Men's individual	Aug 11

Medals by sport
Sport	1st place, gold medalist(s)	2nd place, silver medalist(s)	3rd place, bronze medalist(s)	Total
Rowing	4	2	2	8
Karate	1	2	1	4
Roller sports	1	2	0	3
Cycling	1	1	4	6
Athletics	1	1	1	3
Tennis	1	1	0	2
Judo	1	0	1	2
Beach volleyball	1	0	0	1
Gymnastics	1	0	0	1
Weightlifting	1	0	0	1
Water skiing	0	2	1	3
Canoeing	0	2	0	2
Archery	0	1	0	1
Fencing	0	1	0	1
Handball	0	1	0	1
Modern pentathlon	0	1	0	1
Shooting	0	1	0	1
Swimming	0	1	0	1
Taekwondo	0	0	2	2
Basque pelota	0	0	1	1
Bodybuilding	0	0	1	1
Golf	0	0	1	1
Sailing	0	0	1	1
Squash	0	0	1	1
Wrestling	0	0	1	1
Total	13	19	18	50

Medals by day
Day	Date	1st place, gold medalist(s)	2nd place, silver medalist(s)	3rd place, bronze medalist(s)	Total
2	July 28	0	1	4	5
3	July 29	0	2	1	3
4	July 30	3	2	0	5
5	July 31	0	0	0	0
6	August 1	0	0	1	1
7	August 2	0	1	0	1
8	August 3	1	0	1	2
9	August 4	1	1	0	2
10	August 5	0	1	0	1
11	August 6	0	1	1	2
12	August 7	0	0	1	1
13	August 8	2	1	2	5
14	August 9	2	1	3	6
15	August 10	2	4	3	9
16	August 11	2	4	1	7
Total		13	19	18	50

Medals by gender
Gender	1st place, gold medalist(s)	2nd place, silver medalist(s)	3rd place, bronze medalist(s)	Total
Female	4	8	6	18
Male	8	11	11	30
Mixed	1	0	1	2
Total	13	19	18	50

Multiple medalists
Name	Sport	1st place, gold medalist(s)	2nd place, silver medalist(s)	3rd place, bronze medalist(s)	Total
Antonia Abraham	Rowing	2	0	0	2
Melita Abraham	Rowing	2	0	0	2
Ignacio Abraham	Rowing	1	1	0	2
Christopher Kalleg	Rowing	1	1	0	2
Isidora Niemeyer	Rowing	1	1	0	2
Felipe Peñaloza	Cycling	1	0	2	3
Antonio Cabrera	Cycling	1	0	1	2
Soraya Jadué	Rowing	1	0	1	2
María Mailliard	Canoeing	0	2	0	2
César Abaroa	Rowing	0	1	1	2
José Luis Rodríguez	Cycling	0	0	2	2

== Competitors ==
The following is the list of number of competitors (per gender) participating at the games per sport/discipline.

Sport	Men	Women	Total
Archery	3	3	6
Artistic swimming	—N/a	2	2
Athletics	15	13	28
Badminton	2	2	4
Basque pelota	5	6	11
Bodybuilding	1	1	2
Boxing	1	0	1
Canoeing	3	8	11
Cycling	10	8	18
Diving	2	2	4
Equestrian	9	2	11
Fencing	3	0	3
Field hockey	16	16	32
Golf	2	2	4
Gymnastics	2	6	8
Handball	14	0	14
Judo	3	2	5
Karate	4	2	6
Modern pentathlon	2	1	3
Racquetball	1	2	3
Roller sports	3	3	6
Rowing	15	8	23
Rugby sevens	12	0	12
Sailing	8	4	12
Shooting	6	5	11
Squash	3	3	6
Surfing	2	3	5
Swimming	5	5	10
Taekwondo	3	2	5
Table tennis	3	3	6
Tennis	3	3	6
Triathlon	3	3	6
Volleyball	14	2	16
Water skiing	3	3	6
Weightlifting	3	3	6
Wrestling	1	0	1
Total	188	128	316

== Archery ==
Men

Athlete	Event	Ranking round		Round of 32	Round of 16	Quarterfinal	Semifinal	Final / BM	
Athlete	Event	Score	Rank	Opposition Result	Opposition Result	Opposition Result	Opposition Result	Opposition Result	Rank
Andrés Aguilar Gimpel	Individual recurve	656	15	Soto (CHI); W 6–0	D'Almeida (BRA); L 1–7	did not advance			
Ricardo Soto	Individual recurve	652	18	Gimpel (CHI); D 0–6	did not advance				
Juan Painevil	Individual recurve	624	30	Williams (USA); D 2–6	did not advance				
Andrés Aguilar Gimpel; Juan Painevil; Ricardo Soto	Team recurve	1932	7º	—N/a		Brazil; W 5–4	Mexico; W 6–0	Canada; L 4–5	2nd place, silver medalist(s)

Women

Athlete	Event	Ranking round		Round of 32	Round of 16	Quarterfinal	Semifinal	Final / BM	
Athlete	Event	Score	Rank	Opposition Result	Opposition Result	Opposition Result	Opposition Result	Opposition Result	Rank
Isabella Bassi	Individual recurve	629	10	Pellecer (GUA); L 5–6	did not advance				
Catalina Marquez Rojas	Individual recurve	592	24	Rodríguez (CUB); W 6–2	Mickelberry (USA); L 2–6	did not advance			
Javiera Andrades	Individual recurve	561	30	Román (MEX); L 0–6	did not advance				
Javiera Andrades; Isabella Bassi; Catalina Marquez	Team recurve	1782	7	—N/a		United States; L 0–6	did not advance		

Mixed

Athlete	Event	Ranking round		Round of 16	Quarterfinal	Semifinal	Final / BM	
Athlete	Event	Score	Rank	Opposition Result	Opposition Result	Opposition Result	Opposition Result	Rank
Andrés Aguilar Gimpel; Isabella Bassi	Team recurve	1285	8	O'Brien / Velasquez (PER); W 6–0	Ellison / Kaufhold (USA); L 0–6	did not advance		

== Artistic swimming ==
Chile qualified a duet of two athletes.

Women

Athlete	Event	Technical Routine		Free Routine (Final)			
Athlete	Event	Points	Rank	Points	Rank	Total Points	Rank
Isidora Letelier; Natalie Lubascher	Duet	73.0259	8	75.4000	7	148.4259	7

== Badminton ==
Chile qualified a team of four badminton athletes (two per gender).

Men

Athlete	Event	Round of 64	Round of 32	Round of 16	Quarterfinals	Semifinals	Final / BM	
Athlete	Event	Opposition Score	Opposition Score	Opposition Score	Opposition Score	Opposition Score	Opposition Score	Rank
Cristián Araya	Singles	BYE	Muñoz (PAN); W 21–11, 21–12	Montoya (MEX); L 12–21, 14–21	did not advance			
Iván León	Singles	Darmohoetomo (SUR); W 22–20, 21–11	Cavallotti (CRC); W 21–12, 21–15	Muñoz (MEX); L 10–21, 9–21	did not advance			
Cristián Araya; Iván León	Doubles	—N/a	—N/a	Cuba / Mini (PER); L 12–21, 13–21	did not advance			

Women

Athlete	Event	Round of 64	Round of 32	Round of 16	Quarterfinals	Semifinals	Final / BM	
Athlete	Event	Opposition Score	Opposition Score	Opposition Score	Opposition Score	Opposition Score	Opposition Score	Rank
Ashley Montre	Singles	Zambrano (ECU); L 12–21, 10–21	did not advance					
Constanza Naranjo	Singles	BYE	Macías (PER); L 7–21, 4–21	did not advance				
Ashley Montre; Constanza Naranjo	Doubles	—N/a	—N/a	BYE	Santos / Silva (BRA); L 7–21, 13–21	did not advance		

Mixed

Athlete	Event	Round of 32	Round of 16	Quarterfinals	Semifinals	Final / BM	
Athlete	Event	Opposition Score	Opposition Score	Opposition Score	Opposition Score	Opposition Score	Rank
Cristián Araya; Constanza Naranjo	Doubles	Javier / Jiménez (DOM); L 19–21, 15–21	did not advance				
Iván León; Ashley Montre	Doubles	Barrios / Sánchez (VEN); W 21–18, 21–12	Shu / Obañana (USA); L 21–17, 14–21, 11–21	did not advance			

== Basque pelota ==
Men

Athlete	Event	Preliminary round					Semifinal	Final / BM	
Athlete	Event	Opposition Result	Opposition Result	Opposition Result	Opposition Result	Rank	Opposition Result	Opposition Result	Rank
Manuel Domínguez; Esteban Romero	Men's Doubles Trinquete Rubber	A Guichon (URU); L Rivas (URU); W 15–10, 10–15, 10–6	Sa Andreasen (ARG); Se Andreasen (ARG); L 1–15, 12–15	A Bellido (PER); E Velasquez (PER); W 15–5, 15–2	D García (MEX); I Pérez (MEX); L 10–15, 12–15	3 Q	—N/a	A Guichon (URU); L Rivas (URU); W 15–8, 15–4	3rd place, bronze medalist(s)
Jesús García Toro; Julián González	Men's Doubles Frontenis	J Alberdi (ARG); G Osorio (ARG); L 3–15, 7–15	O Espinoza (USA); S Espinoza (USA); L 7–15, 5–15	J López (MEX); L Molina (MEX); L 9–15, 8–15	J Bezada (PER); D Yupanqui (PER); W 15–8, 12–15, 10–8	4 Q	—N/a	J Alberdi (ARG); G Osorio (ARG); L 6–15, 8–15	4
Martín Letelier	Men's Individual Fronton Rubber	R Carrasco (PER); L 5–15, 10–15	A González (CUB); L 4–15, 5–15	F Andreasen (ARG); L 0–15, 1–15	E Segura (ESA); L 6–15, 14–15	5	did not advance		

Women

Athlete	Event	Preliminary round					Semifinal	Final / BM	
Athlete	Event	Opposition Result	Opposition Result	Opposition Result	Opposition Result	Rank	Opposition Result	Opposition Result	Rank
Zita Solas; Rosario Valderrama	Women's Doubles Trinquete Rubber	ML García (ARG); C Pinto (ARG); L 7–15, 6–15	Y Allué (CUB); Y Rodríguez (CUB); W 6–15, 15–7, 10–4	—N/a		2 Q	M Miranda (URU); C Naviliat (URU); L 9–15, 10–15	P Castillo (MEX); R Flores (MEX); L 11–15, 15–9, 7–10	4
Julieta Domínguez; Maritxu Bastarrica	Women's Doubles Fronton Rubber	D Darriba (CUB); Y Medina (CUB); L 1–15, 3–15	D Figueroa (MEX); L Puentes (MEX); L 1–15, 1–15	S Andrade (ARG); M Spahn (ARG); L 3–15, 7–15	J Bernal (PER); M Rodríguez (PER); L 1–15, 2–15	5	—N/a	did not advance	
Magdalena Muñoz; Natalia Bozzo	Women's Doubles Frontenis	L Castillo (CUB); Y Medina (CUB); L 2–15, 6–15	N Paredes (PER); M Rodríguez (PER); L 12–15, 15–10, 8–10	—N/a		3	did not advance		
Rosario Valderrama	Women's Individual Peruvian Fronton	M Spahn (ARG); L 4–15, 7–15	W Durán (CUB); L 2–15, 5–15	C Suárez (PER); L 5–15, 3–15	D Rangel (VEN); L 12–15, 7–15	5	—N/a	did not advance	

== Bodybuilding ==
Chile qualified a full team of two bodybuilders.

Athlete	Event	Pre-judging		Final	
Athlete	Event	Points	Ranking	Points	Ranking
Pablo Barnert	Men's class bodybuilding	—N/a		Não avançou	
Macarena Miranda	Women's bikini fitness	—N/a		31	3rd place, bronze medalist(s)

- There were no results in the pre-judging stage, with only the top six advancing.

== Boxing ==
Chile qualified one male boxer.

Men

Athlete	Event	Quarterfinals	Semifinals	Final
Athlete	Event	Opposition Result	Opposition Result	Opposition Result
Héctor Tapia	52 kg	Marte de la Rosa (DOM); L 0–5	did not advance	

== Canoeing ==
=== Slalom ===
Chile qualified a total of three slalom athletes (one man and two women).

Athlete	Event	Preliminary round			Semifinal		Final	
Athlete	Event	Run 1	Run 2	Rank	Time	Rank	Time	Rank
Andraz Echeverría	Men's K-1	86.36	85.29	4 Q	93.25	4 Q	93.01	6
Andraz Echeverría	Men's extreme K-1	—N/a		4	did not advance			
Maria Inzunza	Women's K-1	118.79	115.81	7 Q	134.35	7	did not advance	
Constanza Nobis	Women's extreme K-1	—N/a		3	did not advance			

=== Sprint ===
Chile qualified a total of 8 sprint athletes (two men and six women).

Men

Athlete	Event	Heat		Semifinal		Final	
Athlete	Event	Time	Rank	Time	Rank	Time	Rank
Nicolás Vergara	C-1 1000 m	4:28.820	4 SF	4:19.254	2 QF	4:28.971	8
Miguel Valencia	K-1 200 m	36.856	3 QF	Bye		37.266	5
Miguel Valencia	K-1 1000 m	3:57.279	6 SF	3:50.795	4	did not advance	

Women

Athlete	Event	Heat		Semifinal		Final	
Athlete	Event	Time	Rank	Time	Rank	Time	Rank
María Mailliard	C-1 200 m	45.993	1 QF	Bye		47.031	2nd place, silver medalist(s)
María Mailliard; Karen Roco	C-2 500 m	Bye				1:59.158	2nd place, silver medalist(s)
Ysumy Orellana	K-1 200 m	43.258	2 QF	Bye		45.121	6th
Ysumy Orellana	K-1 500 m	2:00.722	3 SF	2:00.283	1 QF	1:59.714	5th
Ysumy Orellana; Fabiola Zamorano	K-2 500 m	1:55.844	3 SF	1:52.628	2 QF	1:57.214	7th
Fernanda Iracheta; Ysumy Orellana; Goviana Reyes; Fabiola Zamorano	K-4 500 m	Bye				1:40.811	4th

Qualification legend: QF – Qualify to final; SF – Qualify to semifinal

== Cycling ==
=== BMX ===
Freestyle

Athlete	Event	Qualification		Final	
Athlete	Event	Points	Rank	Points	Rank
Macarena Perez Grasset	Women's	72.50	2º	76.67	2nd place, silver medalist(s)

Racing

Athlete	Event	Ranking round		Quarterfinal		Semifinal		Final	
Athlete	Event	Time	Rank	Points	Rank	Time	Rank	Time	Rank
Hernán Godoy	Men's	35.030	13	12	4 Q	22	8	Did not advance	
Mauricio Molina	Men's	35.286	14	10	3 Q	18	6	Did not advance	
Rocío Pizarro	Women's	44.650	12	—N/a		17	6	Did not advance	

=== Mountain biking ===
Athlete	Event	Time	Rank
Martín Vidaurre	Men's	1:27:31	3rd place, bronze medalist(s)
Sebastián Miranda	Men's	1:34:22	12
María Fernanda González	Women's	DNF	

=== Road cycling ===
Athlete	Event	Time	Rank
José Aguilar	Men's road race	4:06:29	7
Pablo Cares	Men's road race	4:09:03	16
Felipe Peñaloza	Men's road race	4:09:50	35
Diego Geldrez	Men's road race	4:09:20	36
José Aguilar	Men's time trial	46:25.51	3rd place, bronze medalist(s)
Diego Geldrez	Men's time trial	48:27.62	12
Denisse Riquelme	Women's road race	2:19:50	4
Anany Ramos	Women's road race	2:19:52	11
Aranza Villalón	Women's road race	2:19:53	17
Aranza Villalón	Women's time trial	26:45.07	9

=== Track cycling ===
Keirin

Athlete	Event	Heats	Repechage	Final
Athlete	Event	Rank	Rank	Rank
Anany Ramos	Women's	4 R	4 FB	8

Madison

Athlete	Event	Points	Rank
Antonio Cabrera Torres; Felipe Peñaloza	Men's	88	1st place, gold medalist(s)
Aranza Villalón; Paula Villalón	Women's	-40	7

Pursuit

Athlete	Event	Qualification		Semifinals	Finals	
Athlete	Event	Time	Rank	Opposition Result	Opposition Result	Rank
Felipe Peñaloza; Antonio Cabrera Torres; José Luís Aguilar; Pablo Duque	Men's team	4:07.393	3 QB	—N/a	Mexico; W 4:03.970	3rd place, bronze medalist(s)
Victoria Retamal; Denisse Riquelme; Aranza Sánchez; Paula Sánchez	Women's team	4:46.776	5 Q	Peru; W 4:46.886	—N/a	5

Omnium

Athlete	Event	Scratch race		Tempo race		Elimination race		Points race		Total	
Athlete	Event	Rank	Points	Points	Rank	Rank	Points	Points	Rank	Points	Rank
Felipe Peñaloza	Men's	2	38	38	2	1	40	50	3	166	3rd place, bronze medalist(s)
Aranza Sánchez	Women's	1	40	34	4	14	14	23	4	111	5

== Diving ==
Men

Athlete	Event	Preliminary		Final	
Athlete	Event	Points	Rank	Points	Rank
Donato Neglia	Men's 1m Springboard	289.45	11 Q	333.25	10
Diego Carquin	Men's 1m Springboard	286.55	13	Did not advance	
Donato Neglia	Men's 3m Springboard	363.40	15	Did not advance	
Diego Carquin	Men's 3m Springboard	344.55	16	Did not advance	
Donato Neglia; Diego Carquin	Men's 3m Synchro	—N/a		341.64	7

Women

Athlete	Event	Preliminary		Final	
Athlete	Event	Points	Rank	Points	Rank
Alison Maillard	Women's 1m Springboard	227.30	8 Q	254.70	6
Wendy Espina	Women's 1m Springboard	202.15	13	Did not advance	
Alison Maillard	Women's 3m Springboard	244.70	11 Q	253.45	10
Wendy Espina	Women's 3m Springboard	203.40	14	Did not advance	

== Equestrian ==
Chile qualified a full team of 12 equestrians (four per discipline).

=== Dressage ===
Athlete	Horse	Event	Qualification						Grand Prix Freestyle / Intermediate I Freestyle	
Athlete	Horse	Event	Grand Prix / Prix St. Georges		Grand Prix Special / Intermediate I		Total		Grand Prix Freestyle / Intermediate I Freestyle	
Athlete	Horse	Event	Score	Rank	Score	Rank	Score	Rank	Score	Rank
Carlos Fernandez	Destinado XXXVII	Individual	64.676	26	62.765	29	127.441	28	did not advance	
Barbara Weber	Entusiasta	Individual	Eliminated		did not advance					
Virginia Yarur	E Rava	Individual	69.500	9	61.265	30	130.765	21	did not advance	
Carlos Fernandez; Barbara Weber; Virginia Yarur	As above	Team	Eliminated		did not advance				—N/a	

=== Eventing ===
Athlete	Horse	Event	Dressage		Cross-country		Jumping		Total	
Athlete	Horse	Event	Points	Rank	Points	Rank	Points	Rank	Points	Rank
Guillermo Garin	Bipolar	Individual	45.40	40	Eliminated		did not advance			
Luis Larrondo	Puerto Octay	Individual	40.90	26	35.20	18	9.20	21	85.30	18
Carlos Lobos	Ranco	Individual	31.00	10	18.40	11	4.00	11	53.40	9
Carlos Villarroel	Quilano	Individual	39.20	22	Eliminated		did not advance			
Guillermo Garin; Luis Larrondo; Carlos Lobos; Carlos Villarroel	As above	Team	111.10	5	1053.60	7	13.20	6	1138.70	6

=== Jumping ===
Athlete	Horse	Event	Qualification								Final					
Athlete	Horse	Event	Round 1		Round 2		Round 3		Total		Round A		Round B		Total	
Athlete	Horse	Event	Faults	Rank	Faults	Rank	Faults	Rank	Faults	Rank	Faults	Rank	Faults	Rank	Faults	Rank
Rodrigo Carrasco	Acapulco FZ	Individual	15.26	38	Eliminated		Did not advance									
Nicolas Imschenetzky	Valentino Massuere	Individual	43.24	48	Eliminated		Did not advance									
Ignacio Montesinos	Cornetboy	Individual	5.33	18	0	1	0	1	5.33	4 Q	12	19	0	1	12	14
Bernardo Naveillan	Daisy Grand Moustier	Individual	7.90	27	4	9	4	9	15.90	14 Q	16	24	Did not advance		16	24
Rodrigo Carrasco; Nicolas Imschenetzky; Ignacio Montesinos; Bernardo Naveillan	As above	Team	28.49	8	Eliminated		did not advance				—N/a					

== Fencing ==
Chile qualified a team of 3 male fencers.

Athlete	Event	Ranking round			Round of 16	Quarterfinal	Semifinal	Final / BM	
Athlete	Event	Victories	Defeats	Rank	Opposition Result	Opposition Result	Opposition Result	Opposition Result	Rank
Pablo Nuñez	Individual épée	0	5	18	did not advance				18
Gustavo Alarcón	Individual foil	2	3	10 Q	Toldo (BRA); W 15-12	Sconzo (COL); W 15-14	Imboden (USA); W 15-13	Meinhardt (USA); L 11-15	2nd place, silver medalist(s)
Ricardo Álvarez García	Individual sabre	1	4	14 Q	Homer (USA); L 3-15	did not advance			16

== Field hockey ==
Chile qualified a men's and women's team (of 16 athletes each, for a total of 32). The men qualified by being ranked second at the 2018 South American Games. The women's team qualified by being ranked as one of the top three nations not already qualified from the 2017 Women's Pan American Cup.

=== Men's tournament ===
Preliminary round

Pos	Team	Pld	W	D	L	GF	GA	GD	Pts	Qualification
1	Argentina	3	3	0	0	20	1	+19	9	Quarter-finals
2	Chile	3	2	0	1	7	5	+2	6	Quarter-finals
3	Cuba	3	1	0	2	3	15	−12	3	Quarter-finals
4	Trinidad and Tobago	3	0	0	3	2	11	−9	0	Quarter-finals

Source: FIH

30 July 2019
10:00

Argentina	5–1	Chile
Tolini 4', 5'; Ferreiro 8'; Martínez 26'; Vila 30'	Report	Becerra 31'

Umpires:
Peter Wright (RSA)
Gus Soteriades (USA)

1 August 2019
14:00

Chile	4–0	Cuba
Becerra 14', 17'; Richter 36'; Fer. Renz 60'	Report

Umpires:
Gus Soteriades (USA)
Jonathan Altamirano (MEX)

3 August 2019
10:00

Chile	2–0	Trinidad and Tobago
Rodriguez 15'; Amoroso 37'	Report

Umpires:
Tyler Klenk (CAN)
Jonathan Altamirano (MEX)

Quarter-finals

5 August 2019
15:45

Chile	2–0	Mexico
Fel. Renz 22'; Richter 54'	Report

Umpires:
Peter Wright (RSA)
Hugo Romero (PAR)

Semi-finals

8 August 2019
17:15

Chile	2–3	Canada
Rodriguez 23', 54'	Report	Tupper 19', 55'; Johnston 43'

Umpires:
Deepak Joshi (IND)
Gus Soteriades (USA)

Bronze medal match

10 August 2019
15:00

United States	2–1	Chile
Huisman 2'; A. Käppeler 38'	Report	Renz 50'

Umpires:
Federico Silva (ARG)
Tyler Klenk (CAN)

=== Women's tournament ===
The following 16 players were named in the Chile squad.

Head Coach: Diego Amoroso

No.	Pos.	Player	Date of birth (age)	Caps	Club
1	GK	Claudia Schüler	28 November 1987 (aged 31)	213	(Germany) Club an der Alster
3	DF	Fernanda Villagran	12 August 1997 (aged 21)	56	(Chile) Club Manquehue
4	DF	Catalina Barahona	2 January 1994 (aged 25)	31	(United States) ODU Monarchs
6	DF	Fernanda Flores	14 September 1993 (aged 25)	155	(Chile) Universidad Católica
13	DF	Camila Caram (C)	22 April 1989 (aged 30)	225	(Chile) Prince of Wales Country Club
16	DF	Constanza Palma	29 March 1992 (aged 27)	159	(Chile) Universidad Católica
5	MF	Denise Krimerman	4 July 1994 (aged 25)	148	(Chile) Old Reds
8	MF	Carolina García	21 March 1985 (aged 34)	245	(Chile) Prince of Wales Country Club
19	MF	Agustina Solano	5 April 1995 (aged 24)	45	(Chile) Universidad Católica
20	MF	Francisca Parra	6 October 1999 (aged 19)	20	(Chile) Universidad Católica
25	MF	María Maldonado	13 August 1997 (aged 21)	49	(Chile) Prince of Wales Country Club
2	FW	Sofía Walbaum	18 May 1989 (aged 30)	203	(Chile) Prince of Wales Country Club
9	FW	Kim Jacob	5 August 1996 (aged 22)	60	(Chile) Club Manquehue
10	FW	Manuela Urroz	24 September 1991 (aged 27)	187	(Belgium) Royal Antwerp
21	FW	Josefa Villalabeitia	12 October 1990 (aged 28)	171	(Chile) Prince of Wales Country Club
30	FW	Consuelo de las Heras	22 September 1995 (aged 23)	34	(Chile) S.M.O.G.

Reserves:

- Mariana Lagos
- Natalia Salvador (GK)

Preliminary round

Pos	Team	Pld	W	D	L	GF	GA	GD	Pts	Qualification
1	United States	3	3	0	0	17	2	+15	9	Quarter-finals
2	Chile	3	2	0	1	17	4	+13	6	Quarter-finals
3	Mexico	3	1	0	2	4	7	−3	3	Quarter-finals
4	Peru (H)	3	0	0	3	0	25	−25	0	Quarter-finals

Source: FIH
(H) Hosts

29 July 2019
16:00

Chile	13–0	Peru
Maldonado 4', 54', 59'; Walbaum 5'; Villagran 10', 19', 35'; Urroz 28', 47', 59'; García 41'; De las Heras 43'; Jacob 53'	Report

Umpires:
Ayanna McClean (TTO)
Mary Driscoll (USA)

31 July 2019
12:00

Chile	2–4	United States
De las Heras 12'; Urroz 36'	Report	Matson 50'; Moyer 51'; Froede 53'; Sharkey 56'

Umpires:
Amber Church (NZL)
Victoria Pazos (PAR)

2 August 2019
16:00

Mexico	0–2	Chile
	Report	García 31'; Urroz 33'

Umpires:
Liu Xiaoying (CHN)
Victoria Pazos (PAR)

Quarter-finals

4 August 2019
15:00

Uruguay	0–5	Chile
	Report	Maldonado 15', 17', 34'; Villagran 37'; Urroz 49'

Umpires:
Liu Xiaoying (CHN)
Ayanna McClean (TTO)

Semi-finals

6 August 2019
15:00

Argentina	3–1	Chile
Rebecchi 3'; Jankunas 44', 60'	Report	Krimerman 45'

Umpires:
Ayanna McClean (TTO)
Liu Xiaoying (CHN)

Bronze medal match

9 August 2019
15:00

Chile	1–5	United States
De las Heras 3'	Report	Moyer 2'; Matson 19', 24', 52'; Sharkey 21'

Umpires:
Amber Church (NZL)
Maria Locatelli (ARG)

== Golf ==
Chile qualified a full team of four golfers (two men and two women).

Athlete(s)	Event	Final						
Athlete(s)	Event	Round 1	Round 2	Round 3	Round 4	Total	To par	Rank
Guillermo Pereira	Men's individual	67	67	69	66	269	-15	3rd place, bronze medalist(s)
Felipe Aguilar	Men's individual	76	74	72	75	297	+13	30
Antonia Matte	Women's individual	79	71	76	74	300	+16	21
Natalia Villavicencio	Women's individual	71	80	78	76	305	+21	26
Guillermo Pereira; Felipe Aguilar; Antonia Matte; Natalia Villavicencio	Mixed team	138	138	145	140	561	-7	8

== Gymnastics ==
=== Artistic ===
Chile qualified two male gymnasts and a team of five female gymnasts.

Men
Individual Qualification

Athlete	Event	Final							
Athlete	Event	Apparatus						Total	Rank
Athlete	Event	F	PH	R	V	PB	HB	Total	Rank
Joel Álvarez	Qualification	12.700 (26)	11.100 (36)	12.800 (27)	—N/a	13.550 (14) R3	12.900 (17)	—N/a	—N/a
Tomás González	Qualification	13.900 (4) Q	—N/a	—N/a	—N/a	—N/a	—N/a	—N/a	—N/a

Qualification Legend: Q = Qualified to apparatus final R# = Reserve for the final

Individual Finals

Athlete	Event	Final							
Athlete	Event	Floor	Pommel horse	Rings	Vault	Parallel bars	Horizontal bar	Total	Rank
Joel Álvarez	Individual All-around	13.150	10.750	12.000	13.950	13.000	12.900	75.750	15th
Tomás González	Individual Floor	14.600						14.600	1st place, gold medalist(s)

Women
Team & Individual Qualification

Athlete	Event	Final					
Athlete	Event	Apparatus				Total	Rank
Athlete	Event	F	V	UB	BB	Total	Rank
Simona Castro	Qualification	12.050	13.300	12.200	10.700	48.250	20 Q
María del Mar Pérez	Qualification	—N/a	—N/a	11.750	11.750	—N/a	—N/a
María del Sol Pérez	Qualification	11.350	11.950	11.950	10.800	46.050	29 Q
Makarena Pinto	Qualification	11.150	13.675 Q	—N/a	—N/a	—N/a	—N/a
Franchesca Santi	Qualification	12.100	13.825 Q	12.900	10.650	45.150	31
Total	Team	35.500	40.850	35.900	33.250	145.500	8

Qualification Legend: Q = Qualified to apparatus final

Individual Finals

Athlete	Event	Final					
Athlete	Event	Vault	Floor	Balance Beam	Uneven bars	Total	Rank
Simona Castro	Individual All-around	13.250	11.700	12.650	10.650	48.250	14th
María del Sol Pérez	Individual All-around	11.700	10.550	11.600	10.150	44.000	24th
Makarena Pinto	Individual Vault	13.750					5th
Franchesca Santi	Individual Vault	13.516					8th

=== Trampoline ===
Chile qualified a one male trampolinist.

== Handball ==
Chile qualified a men's team of 14 athletes.

=== Men's tournament ===
Pool stage

Pos	Team	Pld	W	D	L	GF	GA	GD	Pts	Qualification
1	Argentina	3	3	0	0	92	75	+17	6	Semifinals
2	Chile	3	2	0	1	101	85	+16	4	Semifinals
3	United States	3	1	0	2	77	97	−20	2	5–8th place semifinals
4	Cuba	3	0	0	3	74	87	−13	0	5–8th place semifinals

Source: Lima 2019
Rules for classification: 1) points; 2) head-to-head points; 3) head-to-head goal difference; 4) head-to-head goals scored; 5) goal difference; 6) goals scored; 7) draw.

31 July 2019; 13:00	Cuba	28–38	Chile	Villa Deportiva Nacional; Referees: Raluy, Sabroso (ESP)
31 July 2019; 13:00	Corzo 8	(10–20)	Er. Feuchtmann, R. Salinas 10	Villa Deportiva Nacional; Referees: Raluy, Sabroso (ESP)
31 July 2019; 13:00	2× (yellow card) 2× (suspension)	Report	1× (yellow card) 6× (suspension)	Villa Deportiva Nacional; Referees: Raluy, Sabroso (ESP)

1 August 2019; 20:30	Chile	29−31	Argentina	Villa Deportiva Nacional; Referees: Raluy, Sabroso (ESP)
1 August 2019; 20:30	Er. Feuchtmann 7	(15−12)	Simonet 8	Villa Deportiva Nacional; Referees: Raluy, Sabroso (ESP)
1 August 2019; 20:30	3× (yellow card) 8× (suspension) 1× (red card)	Report	3× (yellow card) 6× (suspension)	Villa Deportiva Nacional; Referees: Raluy, Sabroso (ESP)

2 August 2019; 13:00	United States	26−34	Chile	Villa Deportiva Nacional; Referees: Sosa, Lemes (URU)
2 August 2019; 13:00	Hines 5	(11−17)	Ceballos, R. Salinas 8	Villa Deportiva Nacional; Referees: Sosa, Lemes (URU)
2 August 2019; 13:00	3× (yellow card) 3× (suspension)	Boxscore	1× (yellow card) 4× (suspension)	Villa Deportiva Nacional; Referees: Sosa, Lemes (URU)

Semifinals

4 August 2019; 18:00	Brazil	29–32	Chile	Villa Deportiva Nacional; Referees: Raluy, Sabroso (ESP)
4 August 2019; 18:00	Langaro 8	(15–18)	Ayala 7	Villa Deportiva Nacional; Referees: Raluy, Sabroso (ESP)
4 August 2019; 18:00	1× (yellow card) 4× (suspension)	Report	2× (yellow card) 3× (suspension)	Villa Deportiva Nacional; Referees: Raluy, Sabroso (ESP)

Final

5 August 2019; 20:30	Chile	27–31	Argentina	Villa Deportiva Nacional; Referees: Raluy, Sabroso (ESP)
5 August 2019; 20:30	Er. Feuchtmann 7	(14–15)	Simonet 11	Villa Deportiva Nacional; Referees: Raluy, Sabroso (ESP)
5 August 2019; 20:30	4× (yellow card) 7× (suspension)	Report	1× (yellow card) 4× (suspension)	Villa Deportiva Nacional; Referees: Raluy, Sabroso (ESP)

== Karate ==
Kumite (sparring)

Athlete	Event	Round robin				Semifinal	Final	
Athlete	Event	Opposition Result	Opposition Result	Opposition Result	Rank	Opposition Result	Opposition Result	Rank
Joaquín Lavín	Men's –60 kg	Estrada (MEX); W 5-5	Martínez (VEN); L 3-5	Escalante (PER); W 8-0	2 Q	Larrosa (URU); W 3-0	Brose (BRA); W 2-0	1st place, gold medalist(s)
Camilo Velozo	Men's –67 kg	Delgado (VEN); L 4-5	Noriega (CUB); W 4-0	Ávila (PER); W 0-0	2 Q	Figueira (BRA); W 7-4	Delgado (VEN); L 0-0	2nd place, silver medalist(s)
Germán Charpentier	Men's –75 kg	Soriano (DOM); L 2-6	Maldonado (GUA); L 0-3	Ortuño (VEN); W HSK	3	Did not advance		
Rodrigo Rojas	Men's +84 kg	Mina (ECU); W 1-0	Beltrán (PER); W 8-0	Lenis (COL); W 1-1	1 Q	Irr (USA); L 1-2	Did not advance	3rd place, bronze medalist(s)
Tihare Astudillo	Women's –55 kg	Flores (MEX); L 4-5	Borzelli (PAN); L 1-8	Kumizaki (BRA); L 0-0	4	Did not advance		
Susana Li	Women's –68 kg	Rodríguez (DOM); W 4-2	Martínez (CHI); L 1-2	Gabriela López López (PER); W 3-0	2 Q	Baute (VEN); W 2-2	Rodríguez (DOM); L 1-4	2nd place, silver medalist(s)

== Modern pentathlon ==
Chile qualified three modern pentathletes (two men and one woman).

Athlete	Event	Fencing (Épée One Touch)			Swimming (200m Freestyle)			Riding (Show Jumping)			Shooting/Running (10 m Air Pistol/3000m)			Total Points	Final Rank
Athlete	Event	Victories	Rank	MP Points	Time	Rank	MP Points	Penalties	Rank	MP Points	Time	Rank	MP Points	Total Points	Final Rank
Esteban Bustos	Men's	22	1	250	2:09.38	11	292	0	1	300	11:00.00	4	640	1482	2nd place, silver medalist(s)
Benjamín Ortiz	Men's	15	20	201	2:13.64	18	283	21	9	279	11:19.621	9	621	1384	13
María José Bravo	Women's	5	30	135	2:40.90	24	229	Eliminated			12:55.00	8	525	889	24

Athletes	Event	Fencing			Swimming			Riding			Shooting/Running			Total Points	Final Rank
Athletes	Event	Victories	Rank	MP Points	Time	Rank	MP Points	Penalties	Rank	MP Points	Time	Rank	MP Points	Total Points	Final Rank
María José Bravo; Benjamín Ortiz	Mixed relay	19	10	190	2:15.97	10	279	did not start						469	12

== Racquetball ==
Chile qualified three racquetball athletes (one man and two women).

Men

Athlete	Event	Qualifying Round robin				Round of 16	Quarterfinals	Semifinals	Final	Rank
Athlete	Event	Match 1	Match 2	Match 3	Rank	Opposition Result	Opposition Result	Opposition Result	Opposition Result	Rank
Francisco Troncoso	Singles	Manzuri (ARG); L 0-2	Pratt (USA); L 0-2	Iwaasa (CAN); L 0-2	4	Did not advance				

Women

Athlete	Event	Qualifying Round robin				Round of 16	Quarterfinals	Semifinals	Final	Rank
Athlete	Event	Match 1	Match 2	Match 3	Rank	Opposition Result	Opposition Result	Opposition Result	Opposition Result	Rank
Josefa Parada	Singles	Viera (CUB); L 0-2	Centellas (BOL); L 0-2	Amaya (COL); L 0-2	4	Did not advance				
Carla Muñoz	Singles	Barrios (BOL); L 0-2	Muñoz (ECU); W 2-0	Felipe (CUB); W 2-0	2Q	Lawrence (USA); L 0-2	Did not advance			16
Carla Muñoz; Josefa Parada	Doubles	(Argentina) Natalia Mendez; María José Vargas; L 0–2	(Mexico) Paola Longoria; Samantha Solis; L 0–2	-	3	(Dominican Republic) Merynanyelly Delgado; Alejanda Jiménez; L 0–2	Did not advance			9
Josefa Parada; Carla Muñoz	Team	—N/a				Ecuador; L 0-2	Did not advance			9

== Roller sports ==
=== Artistic ===
Athlete	Event	Short program		Long program		Total	
Athlete	Event	Score	Rank	Score	Rank	Score	Rank
José Luís Díaz	Men's	47.15	3	65.51	6	112.66	5
Francisca Cabrera	Women's	26.14	4	41.89	5	68.03	4

=== Speed ===
Athlete	Event	Preliminary		Semifinal		Final	
Athlete	Event	Time	Rank	Time	Rank	Time	Rank
Emanuelle Santibañez	Men's 300 m time trial	—N/a				24.979	4
Emanuelle Santibañez	Men's 500 m	44.188	2 Q	44.833	2 Q	41.313	4
Hugo Boada	Men's 10,000 m elimination	—N/a				16:37.560	2nd place, silver medalist(s)
María José Sepúlveda	Women's 300 m time trial	—N/a				26.441	1st place, gold medalist(s)
María José Sepúlveda	Women's 500 m	46.715	2 Q	46.921	3	Did not advance	
Javiera Pendavis	Women's 10,000 m elimination	—N/a				19:34.253	2nd place, silver medalist(s)

== Rugby sevens ==
=== Men's tournament ===
Pool stage

Pos	Team	Pld	W	D	L	PF	PA	PD	Pts	Qualification
1	Brazil	3	2	1	0	85	24	+61	8	Semifinals
2	United States	3	2	0	1	92	19	+73	7	Semifinals
3	Chile	3	1	1	1	108	41	+67	6	5–8th place semifinals
4	Guyana	3	0	0	3	7	208	−201	3	5–8th place semifinals

Source: Lima 2019
Rules for classification: 1) Points; 2) Head-to-head result; 3) Point difference; 4) Points scored; 5) draw.

26 July 2019
11:30

Brazil	14–14	Chile
Try: D. Sancery 1'c L. Duque 7'c Con: M. Duque (1/1) 2'; Reeves (1/1) 9'	Report	Try: Fernández 5'c Urroz 11'c Con: Fernández (1/1) 6'; Torrealba (1/1) 12'

Villa María del Triunfo Sports Center
Referee: Paulo Duarte (Portugal)

27 July 2019
12:15

United States	20–7	Chile
Try: Clark (3) 7'm, 7'm, 9'm Melphy 9'm Con: Melphy (0/4)	Report	Try: Blanc 5'c Con: Fernández (1/1) 6'

Villa María del Triunfo Sports Center
Referee: Francisco Gonzalez (Uruguay)

27 July 2019
15:40

Chile	87–7	Guyana
Try: Urroz 0'c Brangier (3) 1'c, 11'c, 12'c Silva (4) 2'c, 6'c, 7'm, 7'c Fe. Neira 5'c Fernández 8'c Blanc (2) 9'c, 13'm Tredinick 10'c Con: Urroz (4/5) 0', 1', 6', 8'; Fernández (7/8) 3', 5', 9', 9', 11', 11', 12'	Report	Try: Angus 14'c Con: Broomes (1/1) 14'

Villa María del Triunfo Sports Center
Referee: Cisco Lopez (United States)

5th-8th classification

28 July 2019
10:00

Chile	24–5	Uruguay
Try: Fe. Neira 0'm Blanc (2) 5'c, 14'c Fernández 7'm Con: Fernández (2/4) 6', 14'	Report	Try: Ardao 11'm Con: Brazionis (0/1)

Villa María del Triunfo Sports Center
Referee: Neheun Jauri Rivero (Argentina)

5th place match

28 July 2019
14:15

Chile	50–12	Jamaica
Try: Brangier 2'c Sigren 4'm Blanc 5'm Silva (2) 7'c, 14'c Penalty try 7'; Tredinick 9'm Fe. Neira 10'c Con: Fernández (2/5) 3', 7'; Tredinick (2/2) 11', 14'	Report	Try: Dixon 6'c Smith 12'm Con: Adamson (1/2) 6'

Villa María del Triunfo Sports Center
Referee: Francisco Gonzalez (Uruguay)

== Sailing ==
Men

Athlete	Event	Race													Total	
Athlete	Event	1	2	3	4	5	6	7	8	9	10	11	12	M	Points	Rank
Clemente Seguel	Laser	~~17~~	9	12	12	10	7	8	8	3	6	—N/a		16	91	10
Benjamín Grez; Exequiel Grez	49er	~~7~~	7	3	4	7	5	5	4	5	3	3	4	12; DNF	62	5

Women

Athlete	Event	Race													Total	
Athlete	Event	1	2	3	4	5	6	7	8	9	10	11	12	M	Points	Rank
María José Poncell	Laser radial	13	13	11	10	11	12	13	14	8	~~15~~	—N/a		Did not advance	105	13

Mixed

Athlete	Event	Race													Total	
Athlete	Event	1	2	3	4	5	6	7	8	9	10	11	12	M	Points	Rank
Antonio Poncell; Maria Jesús Seguel	Snipe	2	~~9~~	6	4	7	5	7	6	5	7	—N/a		Did not advance	49	6
Felipe Robles; Paula Herman; Andrés Guevara	Lightning	1	1	4	3	4	3	2	6	3	5	—N/a		12; OCS	38	3rd place, bronze medalist(s)
Sebastián Fuenzalida; Trinidad González	Nacra 17	10	8	10	9	9	10	10	10	8	9	9	~~12~~; DNF	Did not advance	102	10

Open

Athlete	Event	Race											Total	
Athlete	Event	1	2	3	4	5	6	7	8	9	10	M	Points	Rank
Diego González	Sunfish	6	6	7	4	~~9~~	6	2	7	6	8	10	62	5

== Shooting ==
Men

Athlete	Event	Qualification		Final	
Athlete	Event	Points	Rank	Points	Rank
Manuel Sánchez	10 m air pistol	568	8 Q	174.2	5
Anyelo Parada	10 m air rifle	617.3	10	Did not advance	
Anyelo Parada	50 m rifle three position	1144	13	Did not advance	
Gianluca Dapelo	Trap	115	13	Did not advance	
Cláudio Vergara	Trap	112	16	Did not advance	
Héctor Flores	Skeet	122+3+2	3 Q	23	5
Jorge Atalah	Skeet	118	8	Did not advance	

Women

Athlete	Event	Qualification		Final	
Athlete	Event	Points	Rank	Points	Rank
Jocelyn Núñez	10 m air pistol	540	24	Did not advance	
Jocelyn Núñez	25 m pistol	555	18	Did not advance	
Gabriela Lobos	10 m air rifle	612.6	14	Did not advance	
Gabriela Lobos	50 m rifle three position	1152	6 Q	392.3	7
Karina Cerpa	10 m air rifle	612.3	15	Did not advance	
Karina Cerpa	50 m rifle three position	1138	10	Did not advance	
Pamela Salman	Trap	101	8	Did not advance	
Francisca Crovetto	Skeet	115	6 Q	47	2nd place, silver medalist(s)

Mixed

Athlete	Event	Qualification		Final	
Athlete	Event	Points	Rank	Points	Rank
Manuel Sánchez; Jocelyn Núñez	10 m air pistol	737	17	Did not advance	
Anyelo Parada; Karina Cerpa	10 m air rifle	820.7	10	Did not advance	
Cláudio Vergara; Pamela Salman	Trap	129	8	Did not advance	

== Squash ==
Chile nominated 6 tennis players (3 men and 3 women) to compete in the tournament.

Men

Athlete	Event	Round of 32	Round of 16	Quarterfinals	Semifinals	Final / BM	
Athlete	Event	Opposition Score	Opposition Score	Opposition Score	Opposition Score	Opposition Score	Rank
Maximiliano Camiruaga	Singles	Browne (BER); W 3–1	Binnie (JAM); W WD	Salazar (MEX); L 0–3	did not advance		
Jaime Pinto	Singles	Burrowes (JAM); W 3–1	Pezzota (ARG); L 0–3	did not advance			
Maximiliano Camiruaga; Jaime Pinto	Doubles	—N/a	Browne / Franklin (BER); L 1–2	did not advance			

Women

Athlete	Event	Round of 16	Quarterfinals	Semifinals	Final / BM	
Athlete	Event	Opposition Score	Opposition Score	Opposition Score	Opposition Score	Rank
Giselle Delgado	Singles	Khalil (GUY); W 3–1	Sobhy (USA); L 0–3	did not advance		
Ana Pinto	Singles	Fung-A-Fat (GUY); W 3–1	Cornett (CAN); L 0–3	did not advance		
Giselle Delgado; Ana Pinto	Doubles	—N/a	Khalil / Fernandes (GUY); W 2–1	Sobhy / Sobhy (USA); L 0–2	Did not advance	3rd place, bronze medalist(s)

Mixed

Athlete	Event	Quarterfinals	Semifinals	Final / BM	
Athlete	Event	Opposition Score	Opposition Score	Opposition Score	Rank
Matías Lacroix Nova; Camila Gallegos	Doubles	Schnell/ Naughton (CAN); L 0–2	did not advance		

Teams

Athlete	Event	Preliminary Round			Round of 16	Quarterfinals	Semifinals	Final / BM	
Athlete	Event	Opposition Score	Opposition Score	Opposition Score	Opposition Score	Opposition Score	Opposition Score	Opposition Score	Rank
Maximiliano Camiruaga; Matías Lacroix Nova; Jaime Pinto	Men's team	Jamaica; L 1–2	United States; L 0–3	—N/a	Brazil; L 0–3	9th to 12th round Bermuda; W 2–1	9th-10th place match Jamaica; L 0–2	Did not advance	10
Giselle Delgado; Camila Gallegos; Ana Pinto	Women's team	Mexico; L 0–3	Argentina; L 1–2	United States; L 0–3	—N/a	Canada; L 0–3	5th to 8th round Argentina; L 1–2	7th-8th place match Peru; W 2–1	7

== Surfing ==
Chile qualified five surfers (two men and three women) in the sport's debut at the Pan American Games.

Artistic

Athlete	Event	Round 1	Round 2	Round 3	Round 4	Repechage 1	Repechage 2	Repechage 3	Repechage 4	Repechage 5	Bronze medal	Final	
Athlete	Event	Opposition Result	Opposition Result	Opposition Result	Opposition Result	Opposition Result	Opposition Result	Opposition Result	Opposition Result	Opposition Result	Opposition Result	Opposition Result	Rank
Guillermo Satt	Men's open	Bellorin (VEN); W 9.04–11.97	Did not advance			Delgado (PUR); W 12.06–6.90 Q	Bellorin (VEN); L 5.66–12.67	Did not advance					
Rafael Cortéz	Men's longboard	Gil (ARG), Conceição (BRA); L 9.56	Did not advance			Villao (ECU), Ferrer (PUR); W 11.67 Q	Flores (CRC); W 12.43–7.94 Q	Schweizer (URU); L 7.03–15.10	Did not advance				
Jessica Anderson	Women's open	Detmers (MEX); L 7.87–12.00	Did not advance			Alonso (PAN); W 10.10–7.33 Q	Ribeiro (BRA); W 9.33–3.70 Q	Indurain (ARG); W 11.67–9.77 Q	Detmers (MEX); L 9.66–9.77	Did not advance			
Carla Pérez	Women's stand up paddleboard	Appleby (USA), Alabi (ESA); L 0.00	Did not advance			Bruhwiler (CAN), Soriano (ECU); L 2.33	Did not advance						
Constanza Fernandez	Women's longboard	Reyes (PER), Soriano (ECU); L 4.70	Did not advance			Machuca (MEX), Bermudez (VEN); W 4.60 Q	Soriano (ECU); L 3.33–7.84	Did not advance					

Race

Athlete	Event	Time	Rank
Carla Pérez	Women's stand up paddleboard	42:18.4	10

== Swimming ==
Chile qualified nine swimmers (five men and four women).

Men

Event	Athletes	Heats		Final	
Event	Athletes	Time	Position	Time	Position
50 m freestyle	Oliver Elliot	23.25	16 QB	23.25	15
100 m freestyle	Gabriel Araya	51.45	17 QB	51.25	14
200 m freestyle	Gabriel Araya	1:53.35	17 QB	1:52.85	12
100 m backstroke	Maximiliano Valdovinos	58.30	14 QB	58.29	14
200 m backstroke	Maximiliano Valdovinos	2:10.27	21	did not advance	
100 m breaststroke	José Gálvez Engels	1:06.47	23	did not advance	
200 m breaststroke	José Gálvez Engels	2:23.50	15 QB	2:23.97	14
100 m butterfly	Gabriel Araya	56.13	18	did not advance	
200 m butterfly	Gabriel Araya	2:02.40	13 QB	2:02.73	13
200 m individual medley	Manuel Osorio Moran	2:07.38	17 QB	2:07.44	13
400 m individual medley	Manuel Osorio Moran	4:37.11	17	did not advance	

Women

Event	Athletes	Heats		Final	
Event	Athletes	Time	Position	Time	Position
50 m freestyle	Inés Marín	26.90	=18	did not advance	
100 m freestyle	Inés Marín	58.08	13 QB	57.89	13
200 m freestyle	Inés Marín	2:06.09	11 QB	2:06.64	13
800 m freestyle	Kristel Köbrich	—N/a		8:37.22	4
1500 m freestyle	Kristel Köbrich	—N/a		16:18.19	2nd place, silver medalist(s)
100 m backstroke	Trinidad Ardiles Quiroz	1:06.66	20	did not advance	
200 m backstroke	Trinidad Ardiles Quiroz	2:22.69	18	did not advance	
200 m butterfly	Inés Marín	2:19.60	13 QB	2:19.69	13
200 m individual medley	Fernanda Reyes Hinrichsen	2:27.63	17 QB	2:29.60	16

== Table tennis ==
Men

Athlete	Event	Group stage			Round of 32	Round of 16	Quarterfinal	Semifinal	Final / BM	
Athlete	Event	Opposition Result	Opposition Result	Rank	Opposition Result	Opposition Result	Opposition Result	Opposition Result	Opposition Result	Rank
Juan Lamadrid	Singles	—N/a			Hidalgo (PER); W 4–0	Calderano (BRA); L 1–4	did not advance			
Gustavo Gómez	Singles	—N/a			Villa (MEX); W 4–1	Afanador (PUR); L 3–4	did not advance			
Gustavo Gómez; Juan Lamadrid	Doubles	—N/a				Santos / Wu (DOM); L 1–4	did not advance			
Gustavo Gómez; Juan Lamadrid; Manuel Moya	Team	Cuba; L 0–3	Dominican Republic; L 1–3	3	—N/a		did not advance			

Women

Athlete	Event	Group stage			Round of 32	Round of 16	Quarterfinal	Semifinal	Final / BM	
Athlete	Event	Opposition Result	Opposition Result	Rank	Opposition Result	Opposition Result	Opposition Result	Opposition Result	Opposition Result	Rank
Paulina Vega	Singles	—N/a			Perdomo (COL); W 4–2	Zapata (GUA); W 4–3	Wu (USA); L 0–4	did not advance		
Daniela Ortega	Singles	—N/a			Ortíz (DOM); L 3–4	did not advance				
Daniela Ortega; Paulina Vega	Doubles	—N/a				Fonseca / Lovet (CUB); W 4–3	Cóté / Zhang (CAN); L 1–4	did not advance		
Daniela Ortega; Paulina Vega; Judith Morales	Team	Canada; L 0–3	Peru; W 3–0	2 Q	—N/a		Brazil; L 0–3, 2–3, 0–3	did not advance		

Mixed

Athlete	Event	Round of 16	Quarterfinal	Semifinal	Final / BM	
Athlete	Event	Opposition Result	Opposition Result	Opposition Result	Opposition Result	Rank
Juan Lamadrid; Paulina Vega	Doubles	Hidalgo / Vargas (PER); W 4–0	Afanador / Díaz (PUR); L 2–4	did not advance		

== Taekwondo ==
Kyorugi (sparring)

Men

Athlete	Event	Preliminary round	Quarterfinal	Semifinal	Repechage	Final / BM	
Athlete	Event	Opposition Result	Opposition Result	Opposition Result	Opposition Result	Opposition Result	Rank
Jorge Ramos	–58 kg	Ochoa (COL); L 11–24	Did not advance				
Ignacio Morales	–68 kg	Van Dijk (SUR); W DSQ	León (PER); W 20–5	Pontes (BRA); L 7–18	Bye	Bronze medal contest Nickolas (USA); W 30–11	3rd place, bronze medalist(s)
Fernando Baeza	+80 kg	Perea (ECU); L 25–27	Did not advance				

Women

Athlete	Event	Preliminary round	Quarterfinal	Semifinal	Repechage	Final / BM	
Athlete	Event	Opposition Result	Opposition Result	Opposition Result	Opposition Result	Opposition Result	Rank
Fernanda Aguirre	–57 kg	Andújar (DOM); W 27–7	Park (CAN); L 11–17	Did not advance	—N/a	Bronze medal contest Carstens (PAN); W 12–7	3rd place, bronze medalist(s)
Claudia Gallardo	–67 kg	Arnoldt (ARG); L 7–9	Did not advance				

== Tennis ==
Chile nominated 6 tennis players (3 men and 3 women) to compete in the tournament.

Men

Athlete	Event	Round of 64	Round of 32	Round of 16	Quarterfinals	Semifinals	Final / BM	
Athlete	Event	Opposition Score	Opposition Score	Opposition Score	Opposition Score	Opposition Score	Opposition Score	Rank
Tomás Barrios	Singles	BYE	Alvarado (ESA); W 6–2, 6–2	Quiroz (ECU); W 6–0, 6–3	Varillas (PER); W 4–6, 6–2, 7–6^{(8–6)}	Andreozzi (ARG); W 7–5, 4–6, 6–2	Menezes (BRA); L 5–7, 6–3, 4–6	2nd place, silver medalist(s)
Nicolás Jarry	Singles	BYE	Álvarez (PER); W 6–2, 7–6^{(7–4)}	González (COL); W 6–2, 7–6^{(7–1)}	Menezes (BRA); L 5–7, 4–6	did not advance		
Alejandro Tabilo	Singles	BYE	Maginley (ANT); W 6–1, 6–3	Hernández (DOM); L 2–6, 6–3, 4–6	did not advance			
Tomás Barrios; Alejandro Tabilo	Doubles	—N/a	BYE	Rivera / Pérez (CUB); W 6–3, 6–2	Escobar / Quiroz (ECU); L 4–6, 4–6	did not advance		

Women

Athlete	Event	Round of 32	Round of 16	Quarterfinals	Semifinals	Final / BM	
Athlete	Event	Opposition Score	Opposition Score	Opposition Score	Opposition Score	Opposition Score	Rank
Fernanda Brito	Singles	Podoroska (ARG); L 2–6, 5–7	did not advance				
Daniela Seguel	Singles	Morales (GUA); W 6–1, 6–0	Herazo (COL); W 6–2, 6–1	Dolehide (USA); L 5–7, 6–7^{(2–7)}	did not advance		
Alexa Guarachi; Daniela Seguel	Doubles	—N/a	BYE	Arango / Herazo (COL); W 6–2, 6–1	Arconada / Dolehide (USA); L 5–7, 3–6	Alves / Stefani (BRA); L 6–2, 5–7, [9–11]	4

Mixed

Athlete	Event	Round of 16	Quarterfinals	Semifinals	Final / BM	
Athlete	Event	Opposition Score	Opposition Score	Opposition Score	Opposition Score	Rank
Alexa Guarachi; Nicolás Jarry	Doubles	BYE	Osorio / Giraldo (COL); W 6–2, 6–3	Weedon / González (GUA); W 6–1, 6–2	N Zeballos / F Zeballos (BOL); W 6–1, 6–3	1st place, gold medalist(s)

== Triathlon ==
Athlete	Event	Swim (1.5 km)	Trans 1	Bike (40 km)	Trans 2	Run (10 km)	Total time	Rank
Felipe Barraza	Men's	17:41	0:46	1:00:36	0:25	32:34	1:52:02	11
Gaspar Riveros	Men's	17:49	0:47	1:00:28	0:28	32:11	1:51:41	8
Diego Moya	Men's	17:43	0:45	1:00:37	0:23	33:04	1:52:31	14
Bárbara Riveros	Women's	19:52	0:55	1:04:41	0:30	36:44	2:02:42	5
Catalina Salazar	Women's	20:55	1:00	1:15:21	0:35	45:25	2:23:16	26
Macarena Salazar	Women's	19:52	0:55	1:07:05	0:31	40:16	2:08:38	15

Mixed relay

Athlete	Event	Swimming (300 m)	Trans 1	Biking (6.6 km)	Trans 2	Running (1.5 km)	Total	Rank
Catalina Salazar	Mixed relay	4:04	1:04	12:21	0:28	6:13	24:07	—N/a
Felipe Barraza	Mixed relay	3:55	0:45	10:00	0:24	4:26	19:28	—N/a
Macarena Salazar	Mixed relay	4:29	0:51	11:32	0:27	5:28	22:46	—N/a
Diego Moya	Mixed relay	3:56	0:45	10:27	0:24	4:42	20:11	—N/a
Total	Mixed relay	—N/a					1:26:30	8

== Volleyball ==
=== Beach ===
Chile qualified four beach volleyball athletes (two men and two women).

Athlete	Event	Preliminary Round			Rank	Round of 16	Quarterfinals	Semifinals	Final	Final
Athlete	Event	Opposition Score	Opposition Score	Opposition Score	Rank	Opposition Score	Opposition Score	Opposition Score	Opposition Score	Rank
Esteban Grimalt; Marco Grimalt	Men's	Ontiveros / Virgen (MEX); W (21-15, 16-21, 15-10)	Mora / López (NCA); W (21-19, 19-21, 15-13)	Nusbaum / Plantinga (CAN); W (21-11, 21-14)	1 Q	—N/a	Gonzalez / Reyes (CUB); W (21-13, 21-16)	Nusbaum / Plantinga (CAN); W (21-12, 21-14)	Ontiveros / Virgen (MEX); W (21-19, 22-24, 15-9)	1st place, gold medalist(s)
Pilar Mardones; Francisca Rivas	Women's	Orellana / Revuelta (MEX); W (21-19, 21-15)	Horta / Lavalle (BRA); L (16-21, 19-21)	Charles / Valenciana (ISV); W (21-15, 21-10)	2 Q	Allca / Mendoza (PER); W (21-11, 21-17)	Gallay / Pereyra (ARG); L (20-22, 18-21)	Araya / Valenciano (CRC); W (21-10, 21-9)	Ayala / Ríos (COL); L (12-21, 19-21)	6

=== Indoor ===
Chile qualified a men's volleyball team, consisting of 12 athletes.

Summary

Team	Event	Group stage				Semifinal	Final / BM / Pl.	
Team	Event	Opposition Result	Opposition Result	Opposition Result	Rank	Opposition Result	Opposition Result	Rank
Chile men	Men's tournament	United States; W 3–1	Brazil; L 1–3	Mexico; W 3–1	2 Q	Argentina; L 1–3	Brazil; L 0–3	4

=== Men's tournament ===
Group stage

Pos	Team	Pld	W	L	Pts	SW	SL	SR	SPW	SPL	SPR	Qualification
1	Brazil	3	3	0	11	9	4	2.250	303	260	1.165	Semifinals
2	Chile	3	2	1	9	7	5	1.400	263	266	0.989	Semifinals
3	United States	3	1	2	8	6	6	1.000	252	270	0.933	5th–6th place match
4	Mexico	3	0	3	2	2	9	0.222	246	268	0.918	7th–8th place match

Source: Lima 2019

31 July 2019; 18:30	United States	1–3	Chile	Callao Sports Center; Referees: David Reyes (PUR), Nicolás Casado (ARG)
31 July 2019; 18:30	(17–25, 17–25, 25–17, 22–25); P2 P3			Callao Sports Center; Referees: David Reyes (PUR), Nicolás Casado (ARG)

1 August 2019; 20:30	Brazil	3–1	Chile	Callao Sports Center; Referees: Ricardo Borroto (CUB), Walter Vera (PER)
1 August 2019; 20:30	(25–18, 22–25, 25–16, 25–17); P2 P3			Callao Sports Center; Referees: Ricardo Borroto (CUB), Walter Vera (PER)

2 August 2019; 18:30	Mexico	1–3	Chile	Callao Sports Center; Referees: Walter Vera (PER), Nicolas Casado (ARG)
2 August 2019; 18:30	(25–20, 21–25, 22–25, 20–25); P2 P3			Callao Sports Center; Referees: Walter Vera (PER), Nicolas Casado (ARG)

Semifinals

3 August 2019; 20:30	Argentina	3–1	Chile	Callao Sports Center; Referees: David Reyes (PUR), Josmer Perez (DOM)
3 August 2019; 20:30	(25–21, 23–25, 28–26, 25–17); P2 P3			Callao Sports Center; Referees: David Reyes (PUR), Josmer Perez (DOM)

Bronze medal match

4 August 2019; 18:00	Brazil	3–0	Chile	Callao Sports Center; Referees: Josmer Perez (DOM), Nicolás Casado (ARG)
4 August 2019; 18:00	(25–12, 25–19, 25–21); P2 P3			Callao Sports Center; Referees: Josmer Perez (DOM), Nicolás Casado (ARG)

== Weightlifting ==
Chile qualified five weightlifters (two men and three women).

Athlete	Event	Snatch		Clean & jerk		Total	Rank
Athlete	Event	Result	Rank	Result	Rank	Total	Rank
Katherine Landeros	Women's –49 kg	68	11	90	6	158	7
Bastián López	Men's –73 kg	125	9	160	8	285	8
Lenka Rojas	Women's –76 kg	90	7	118	7	208	7
María Fernanda Valdés	Women's –87 kg	112	2	147	1	259	1st place, gold medalist(s)
Camilo Zapata	Men's –96 kg	136	12	175	12	311	12

== Wrestling ==
Men

Athlete	Event	Round of 16	Quarterfinal	Semifinal	Final / BM	
Athlete	Event	Opposition Result	Opposition Result	Opposition Result	Opposition Result	Rank
Yasmani Acosta	Greco-Roman 130 kg	—N/a	Adam Coon (USA); W 8–0	López (CUB); L 0–4	Bronze medal contest Del Río (ARG); W 9–0	3rd place, bronze medalist(s)

== See also ==
- Chile at the 2020 Summer Olympics
