= Archery at the 2019 Pan American Games =

- Archery pictogram
- Venue: Archery field
- Dates: August 7–11, 2019
- No. of events: 8 (3 men, 3 women, 2 mixed)
- Competitors: 84 from 17 nations

Archery competitions at the 2019 Pan American Games in Lima, Peru were held between August 7 and 11, 2019 at the Archery field in the Villa María del Triunfo cluster.

In 2017, Panam Sports added compound events (individual and mixed team), marking the first time ever the discipline has been held at the Pan American Games. Also in 2017, the International Olympic Committee approved the addition of a mixed team event in the recurve discipline, which meant it was subsequently added to these games' event program. This means a total of eight events will be held: three each for men and women, along with two mixed events.

The highest ranked athlete in each individual recurve event (that has not yet qualified) will earn a quota spot for their country at the 2020 Summer Olympics in Tokyo, Japan along with the top mixed recurve team.

== Schedule ==
All times are Lima Time (UTC−5).

== Medal table ==
Rank	Nation	Gold	Silver	Bronze	Total
1	United States	2	2	3	7
2	Canada	2	0	1	3
3	Mexico	1	2	1	4
4	Colombia	1	1	3	5
5	Argentina	1	0	0	1
5	El Salvador	1	0	0	1
7	Brazil	0	1	0	1
7	Chile	0	1	0	1
7	Guatemala	0	1	0	1
Totals (9 entries)		8	8	8	24

== Medalists ==
=== Recurve ===
Event	Gold	Silver	Bronze
Men's individual	Crispin Duenas; Canada	Marcus D'Almeida; Brazil	Eric Peters; Canada
Men's team	Canada; Crispin Duenas; Brian Maxwell; Eric Peters	Chile; Andrés Aguilar; Juan Painevil; Ricardo Soto	United States; Brady Ellison; Thomas Stanwood; Jack Williams
Women's individual	Alejandra Valencia; Mexico	Khatuna Lorig; United States	Casey Kaufhold; United States
Women's team	United States; Casey Kaufhold; Khatuna Lorig; Erin Mickelberry	Mexico; Mariana Avitia; Aída Román; Alejandra Valencia	Colombia; Valentina Acosta; Ana Rendón; Maira Sepúlveda
Mixed team	United States; Casey Kaufhold; Brady Ellison	Colombia; Ana Rendón; Daniel Pineda	Mexico; Alejandra Valencia; Ángel Alvarado

=== Compound ===
Event	Gold	Silver	Bronze
Men's individual	Roberto Hernández; El Salvador	Braden Gellenthien; United States	Daniel Muñoz; Colombia
Women's individual	Sara López; Colombia	Andrea Becerra; Mexico	Paige Pearce; United States
Mixed team	Argentina; María González; Ivan Nikolajuk	Guatemala; María Zebadúa; José del Cid	Colombia; Sara López; Daniel Muñoz

== Participating nations ==
A total of 84 athletes from 17 countries competed across eight events.

- Argentina (6)
- Bolivia (3)
- Brazil (8)
- Canada (7)
- Chile (6)
- Colombia (8)
- Cuba (6)
- Dominican Republic (1)
- Ecuador (3)
- El Salvador (3)
- Guatemala (6)
- Mexico (8)
- Peru (5)
- Puerto Rico (2)
- Trinidad and Tobago (1)
- United States (8)
- Venezuela (3)

== Qualification ==
A total of 84 archers will qualify to compete at the games (42 per gender). A country may enter a maximum of eight archers (four per gender). As host nation, Peru qualifies four athletes automatically (one per individual event). Two qualification tournaments were used to determine the 62 qualifiers in recurve and 18 in compound.

== See also ==
- Archery at the 2020 Summer Olympics
