= Roller sports at the 2019 Pan American Games – Qualification =

The following is the qualification system and qualified countries for the Roller sports at the 2019 Pan American Games competition held in Lima, Peru.

== Qualification ==
A total of 56 roller sports athletes will qualify to compete. 16 will qualify in artistic and 40 in speed skating. The Pan American Championships for each discipline held in 2018 was used to determine the qualifiers.

== Qualification timeline ==
Events	Date	Venue
2018 Artistic Skating Pan American Championships	August 23 – September 8, 2018	(Colombia) Bogotá
2018 Pan American Nations Championship	November 16–25, 2018	(Mexico) Monterrey

== Qualification summary ==
NOC	Figure		Speed		Total
NOC	Men	Women	Men	Women	Total
Argentina	1	1	2	2	6
Brazil	1	1	1		3
Chile	1	1	2	2	6
Colombia	1	1	2	2	6
Costa Rica			2		2
Cuba			1	2	3
Ecuador		1	1	2	4
El Salvador				2	2
Guatemala			1	2	3
Mexico	1		2	2	5
Paraguay	1				1
Peru	1	1	2	1	5
United States	1	1	2	1	5
Uruguay		1			1
Venezuela			2	2	4
Total: 15 NOCs	8	8	20	20	56

== Figure ==
The top seven countries in each event qualified along with hosts Peru, who were given an automatic entrant into each event. A nation could enter a maximum one skater per event. A total of 16 quotas were available (eight per gender).

Event	Qualified Men	Qualified Women
Host nation	Peru	Peru
2018 Pan American Championship	Paraguay; Argentina; United States; Brazil; Colombia; Chile; Mexico	Argentina; Colombia; United States; Brazil; Chile; Ecuador; Uruguay
TOTAL	8	8

== Speed ==
A total of 40 speed skaters qualified. Peru as host nation received the maximum quota allocation of four (two men and two women). The remaining 36 spots were allocated using the results of the Pan American Nations Championship held in Monterrey, Mexico in November 2018.

Event	Skaters per NOC	Qualified Men	Qualified Women
Host nation	2/1	Peru	Peru*
2018 Pan American Nations Championship	2	Argentina; Colombia; Chile; Costa Rica; Mexico; United States; Venezuela	Argentina; Colombia; Chile; Cuba; Ecuador; El Salvador; Guatemala; Mexico; Venezuela
2018 Pan American Nations Championship	1	Brazil; Cuba; Ecuador; Guatemala	United States
TOTAL		20	20

- Peru entered only one female athlete.
