= 2018 Pan American Archery Championships =

- Location: Medellín, Colombia
- Dates: 14–19 August 2018

The 2018 Pan American Archery Championships was held in Medellín, Colombia from 14 to 19 August 2018.

== Medal summary ==
=== Recurve ===
Event	Gold	Silver	Bronze
Men's individual	Ernesto Boardman (MEX)	Crispin Duenas (CAN)	Jack Williams (USA)
Women's individual	Alejandra Valencia (MEX)	Mackenzie Brown (USA)	LaNola Shepherd (USA)
Men's team	United States; Brady Ellison; Matthew Requa; Jack Williams	Chile; Felipe Pérez; Ricardo Soto; Andrés Aguilar	Colombia; Estiven Ramírez; Andrés Pila; Daniel Betancur
Women's team	United States; Kathuna Lorig; Mackenzie Brown; LaNola Shepherd	Mexico; Mariana Avitia; Aída Román; Alejandra Valencia	Brazil; Ane Marcelle dos Santos; Marina Canetta; Ana Luiza Caetano
Mixed team	United States; Mackenzie Brown; Brady Ellison	Brazil; Marina Canetta; Marcus Vinicius D'Almeida	Mexico; Alejandra Valencia; Luis Álvarez

=== Compound ===
Event	Gold	Silver	Bronze
Men's individual	Antonio Hidalgo; Mexico	Bridger Deaton; United States	Camilo Cardona; Colombia
Women's individual	Sara López; Colombia	Nora Valdez; Colombia	Mariana Bernal; Mexico
Men's team	Colombia; Daniel Muñoz; Camilo Cardona; Sebastián Arenas	United States; Reo Wilde; Kris Schaff; Matt Sullivan	Puerto Rico; Bryan Alvarado; Jean Pizarro; José Juan Reyes
Women's team	Mexico; Esmeralda Sánchez; Andrea Becerra; Linda Ochoa-Anderson	Colombia; Sara López; Nora Valdez; Alejandra Usquiano	United States; Paige Pearce; Cassidy Cox; Jamie van Natta
Mixed team	United States; Paige Pearce; Matt Sullivan	Colombia; Sara López; Daniel Muñoz	Mexico; Esmeralda Sánchez; Antonio Hidalgo

== Medal table ==
* Host nation (Colombia)

Rank	Nation	Gold	Silver	Bronze	Total
1	United States	4	3	3	10
2	Mexico	4	1	3	8
3	Colombia*	2	3	2	7
4	Brazil	0	1	1	2
5	Canada	0	1	0	1
5	Chile	0	1	0	1
7	Puerto Rico	0	0	1	1
Totals (7 entries)		10	10	10	30
