= Swimming at the 2019 Pan American Games – Women's 1500 metre freestyle =

Women's 1500 metre freestyle at the 2019 Pan American Games
- Venue: Villa Deportiva Nacional, VIDENA
- Dates: August 10 (Final)
- Competitors: 12 from 8 nations
- Winning time: 16:16.54

Medalists
Gold medal	Delfina Pignatiello	Argentina
Silver medal	Kristel Köbrich	Chile
Bronze medal	Rebecca Mann	United States

The women's 1500 metre freestyle competition of the swimming events at the 2019 Pan American Games was held on 10 August 2019 at the Villa Deportiva Nacional Videna cluster.

== Records ==
Prior to this competition, the existing World Record was as follows:

World record	Katie Ledecky (USA)	15:20.48	Indianapolis, United States	May 16, 2018

== Results ==
KEY:	q	Fastest non-qualifiers	Q	Qualified	GR	Games record	NR	National record	PB	Personal best	SB	Seasonal best

=== Final ===
The final round was held on August 10.

Rank	Heat	Lane	Name	Nationality	Time	Notes
1st place, gold medalist(s)	2	5	Delfina Pignatiello	Argentina	16:16.54	
2nd place, silver medalist(s)	2	4	Kristel Köbrich	Chile	16:18.19	
3rd place, bronze medalist(s)	2	6	Rebecca Mann	United States	16:23.23	
4	2	3	Mariah Denigan	United States	16:27.50	
5	2	2	Viviane Jungblut	Brazil	16:30.00	
6	2	8	Allyson Macías Alba	Mexico	16:35.34	
7	2	7	Ana Marcela Cunha	Brazil	16:39.83	
8	1	4	Regina Caracas Ramírez	Mexico	17:02.06	
9	1	5	María Álvarez	Colombia	17:11.21	
10	2	1	María Bramont-Arias	Peru	17:13.47	
11	1	3	Fanny Sanchez	Peru	17:15.85	
12	1	6	Mariangela Cincotti	Venezuela	18:12.51	
