= Stephanie Barrett =

Canadian archer (born 1979)

Personal information
- Full name: Stephanie Laure Barrett
- Born: January 26, 1979 (age 47) Newmarket, Ontario, Canada
- Height: 186 cm (6 ft 1 in)
- Weight: 84 kg (185 lb)
Medal record
Women's Archery
Representing Canada
Pan American Archery Championships
Bronze medal – third place	2022 Santiago	Women's team

Stephanie Laure Barrett (born January 26, 1979) is a Canadian archer. Barrett took up the sport at 37, and has been practising the sport since a few weeks before the 2016 Summer Olympics.

== Career ==
Barrett began practising archery in 2016, and came first in the Canadian Field and Target Championships in 2018. She competed at the 2019 Pan American Games in Lima, Peru, where she finished tied for 17th in the individual recurve, tied fifth for team and fourth in the mixed team.

In March 2021, Barrett claimed one of three available quota places for the 2020 Summer Olympics in the women's individual recurve at the 2021 Pan American Archery Championships in Monterrey, Mexico, where she won silver. Barrett was officially nominated to the team on May 12, 2021. A week later at the World Cup stop in Lausanne, Switzerland, Barrett scored a 652 in the qualification round, the highest ever by a Canadian woman in an international competition. Barrett competed in women's individual archery at the Olympics in July 2021. At the qualifiers, she ranked #46 out of 64 with a score of 630; she and Crispin Duenas did not have a high enough combined score to qualify for the mixed team event. She lost her individual match with Yasemin Anagoz 6–2.
