= Brian Maxwell (archer) =

Canadian recurve archer

Personal information
- Nationality: Canadian
- Born: January 13, 1986 (age 40) Abbotsford, British Columbia
- Height: 1.84 m (6 ft 0 in)
- Weight: 72 kg (159 lb)

Sport
- Sport: Archery
Medal record
Men's recurve archery
Representing Canada
World Field Championships
Bronze medal – third place	2024 Lac La Biche	Team
Pan American Games
Gold medal – first place	2019 Lima	Team

Brian Maxwell (born January 13, 1986) is a Canadian recurve archer. He won gold at the 2019 Pan American Games in Lima as part of the team competition alongside teammates Crispin Duenas and Eric Peters.
