= Roller sports at the 2019 Pan American Games =

- Roller sports pictograms
- Venues: Polideportivo 3 (artistic); Pista de Patinaje (speed skating)
- Dates: July 26 – August 10, 2019
- No. of events: 8 (4 men, 4 women)
- Competitors: 56 from 15 nations

Roller sports competitions at the 2019 Pan American Games in Lima, Peru were held at the Polideportivo 3 (artistic), and Pista de Patinaje (speed skating).

The artistic competitions started on July 26 and finished on the 27th. Speed skating competitions took place on the 9th and 10th of August.

In 2016, the International Olympic Committee (IOC) made several changes to its sports program, which were subsequently implemented for these games. Included in this was the addition of skateboarding events for the first time to the Pan American Games sports program.

In May 2019, Panam Sports announced that skateboarding was removed from the sports program because World Skate could not guarantee the best athletes competing. Panam Sports also cited a "lack of respect" because World Skate scheduled a World Tour event at the same time as the games and would not authorize the competition as an Olympic qualifier.

8 medal events are scheduled to be contested, two in artistic and six in speed skating. A total of 56 qualified to compete at the games.

== Medal table ==
Rank	Nation	Gold	Silver	Bronze	Total
1	Colombia	5	1	0	6
2	Chile	1	2	0	3
3	Argentina	1	1	0	2
4	Brazil	1	0	1	2
5	Mexico	0	1	2	3
6	Guatemala	0	1	1	2
6	United States	0	1	1	2
6	Venezuela	0	1	1	2
9	Ecuador	0	0	2	2
Totals (9 entries)		8	8	8	24

== Medalists ==
=== Artistic skating ===
Event	Gold	Silver	Bronze
Men's free skating	Juan Sánchez; Argentina	John Burchfield; United States	Gustavo Casado; Brazil
Women's free skating	Bruna Wurts; Brazil	Giselle Soler; Argentina	Eduarda Fuentes; Ecuador

=== Speed skating ===
Event	Gold	Silver	Bronze
Men's 300 metres time-trial	Pedro Causil; Colombia	Johan Guzmán; Venezuela	Jorge Martínez; Mexico
Men's 500 metres	Pedro Causil; Colombia	Jorge Martínez; Mexico	Johan Guzmán; Venezuela
Men's 10,000 metres elimination	Álex Cujavante; Colombia	Hugo Ramírez; Chile	Jorge Bolaños; Ecuador
Women's 300 metres time-trial	María José Moya; Chile	Geiny Pájaro; Colombia	Dalia Soberanis; Guatemala
Women's 500 metres	Geiny Pájaro; Colombia	Dalia Soberanis; Guatemala	Verónica Elías; Mexico
Women's 10,000 metres elimination	Johana Viveros; Colombia	Javiera San Martín; Chile	Kelsey Helman; United States

== Qualification ==
A total of 56 roller sports athletes will qualify to compete. 16 will qualify in artistic and 40 in speed skating. The Pan American Championships for each discipline held in 2018 was used to determine the qualifiers.
