= Ángel Alvarado =

Mexican archer (born 2000)

Personal information
- Full name: Ángel David Alvarado Santín
- Born: 10 October 2000 (age 25)

Sport
- Sport: Archery (recurve)
Medal record
Men's archery
Representing Mexico
Pan American Games
Bronze medal – third place	2019 Lima	Mixed team
World Cup
Gold medal – first place	2021 Guatemala City	Mixed team
Bronze medal – third place	2021 Guatemala City	Individual

Ángel David Alvarado Santín (Note: In this Spanish name, the first or paternal surname is Alvarado and the second or maternal family name is Santín.) (born 10 October 2000) is a Mexican athlete who competes in recurve archery. He is a 2019 Pan American Games bronze medalist in the mixed team recurve archery event.
