= Eric Peters (archer) =

Canadian recurve archer (born 1997)

Personal information
- Full name: Eric Lingfeng Peters
- Born: May 30, 1997 (age 29) Ottawa, Ontario, Canada
- Height: 1.73 m (5 ft 8 in)
- Weight: 81 kg (179 lb)

Sport
- Sport: Archery
Medal record
Men's recurve archery
Representing Canada
World Championships
Silver medal – second place	2023 Berlin	Individual
Pan American Championships
Silver medal – second place	2026 Tlaxcala	Individual
Pan American Games
Gold medal – first place	2019 Lima	Team
Bronze medal – third place	2019 Lima	Individual
Representing (International Olympic Committee) Mixed-NOCs
Youth Olympic Games
Bronze medal – third place	2014 Nanjing	Mixed Team

Eric Lingfeng Peters (born May 30, 1997) is a Canadian recurve archer.

== Career ==
Peters made his international debut at the 2014 Summer Youth Olympics. He finished 17th in the individual event. He won bronze in the international mixed team event alongside Finnish archer Mirjam Tuokkola.

He won gold at the 2019 Pan American Games in Lima as part of the team competition alongside teammates Crispin Duenas and Brian Maxwell. Peters also won a bronze in the individual event in Lima, upsetting world record holder Brady Ellison in the quarterfinals. Eric Peters won a silver medal in 2023 World Archery Championships where he lost to Mete Gazoz by a 6-4 score in Berlin.

In 2024, Peters was named to his first Olympic team. At the 2024 Paris Olympics Peters scored 659 in the qualification round, seeding him 36th. He then made it to the round of 16 via a close shootoff against 4th seed Dhiraj Bommadevara before being knocked out by Tokyo Olympics Silver medallist Mauro Nespoli.
