= Adrián Puentes =

Cuban archer (born 1988)

Personal information
- Full name: Adrián Andres Puentes Peréz
- National team: 2007-
- Born: 3 July 1988 (age 37) Sancti Spíritus, Cuba
- Height: 1.71 m (5 ft 7 in)
- Weight: 76 kg (168 lb)

Sport
- Country: Cuba
- Sport: Archery
- Event: Recurve
Medal record
Representing Cuba
Pan American Games
Gold medal – first place	2007 Rio de Janeiro	Men's individual
- Updated on 1 August 2015

Adrián Andres Puentes Peréz (Note: In this Spanish name, the first or paternal surname is Puentes and the second or maternal family name is Peréz.) (born 3 July 1988 in Sancti Spíritus), known as Adrián Puentes, is a Cuban male recurve archer and part of the national team. He competed at the 2007, 2011 and 2015 Pan American Games in the men's individual and team event.
