= Jack Williams (archer) =

American archer (born 2000)

Personal information
- Born: April 22, 2000 (age 26) Mission Viejo, California, U.S.

Sport
- Sport: Archery
Medal record
Men's recurve archery
Representing United States
World Championships
Silver medal – second place	2021 Yankton	Team
Pan American Games
Gold medal – first place	2023 Santiago	Team
Bronze medal – third place	2019 Lima	Team
Pan American Championships
Gold medal – first place	2018 Medellín	Team
Bronze medal – third place	2018 Medellín	Individual
Bronze medal – third place	2022 Santiago	Team
Bronze medal – third place	2024 Medellín	Individual
Bronze medal – third place	2024 Medellín	Team

Jack Williams (born April 22, 2000) is an American archer. He competed in the men's individual event at the 2020 Summer Olympics held in Tokyo, Japan. Two months later, he won the silver medal in the men's team event at the 2021 World Archery Championships held in Yankton, United States. The following weekend he competed at the 2021 Hyundai World Archery World Cup Final, and became the first archer appearing at the season-ending event as a host representative to take gold.
