= Ricardo Soto =

Chilean recurve archer (born 1999)

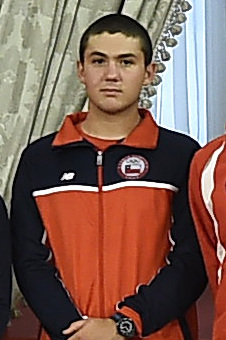
- Soto in 2016

Personal information
- Born: 20 October 1999 (age 26) Concepción, Chile
- Height: 183 cm (72 in)
- Weight: 88 kg (194 lb)

Sport
- Country: Chile
- Sport: Archery
- Event: Recurve
Medal record
Representing Chile
Men's recurve archery
Pan American Games
Silver medal – second place	2019 Lima	Team
Bronze medal – third place	2023 Santiago	Individual
South American Games
Bronze medal – third place	2022 Asunción	Mixed team
Bolivarian Games
Bronze medal – third place	2022 Valledupar	Team
World Youth Championships
Bronze medal – third place	2017 Rosario	Individual

Ricardo Andrés Soto Pedraza (born 20 October 1999) is a Chilean recurve archer from Concepción. In 2009, he moved to Arica. He competed in the archery event at the 2016 Summer Olympics in Rio de Janeiro.

== Career ==
=== 2016 Summer Olympics ===
At the 2016 Summer Olympics in Rio de Janeiro Soto finished his ranking round with a total of 675 points, which gave him the 13th seed for the final competition bracket in which he faced Anton Prylepau in the Round of 64, he won the match 5(29)–5(27). He played Bernardo Oliveira in the Round of 32, winning the match 7–1. In the Round of 16 he played Sjef van den Berg, losing the match 5–6.

=== Pan American Games ===
At the 2023 Pan American Games in Santiago, Chile, Soto won bronze in the Men's individual event.

== Olympic results ==
Year	Event	Ranking round		Round of 64	Round of 32	Round of 16	Quarterfinals	Semifinals	Final / BM	
Year	Event	Score	Seed	Opposition Score	Opposition Score	Opposition Score	Opposition Score	Opposition Score	Opposition Score	Rank
2016	Men's individual	675	13	Prylepau (BLR); W 5 (29)–5 (27)	Oliveira (BRA); W 7–1	van den Berg (NED); L 5–6	did not advance			
