= Marcus Vinicius D'Almeida =

Brazilian archer (born 1998)

Marcus D'Almeida
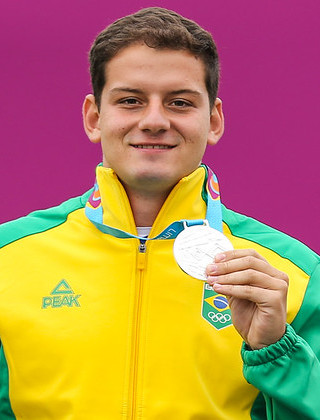
- D'Almeida in 2019

Personal information
- Full name: Marcus Vinicius Carvalho Lopes D'Almeida
- Born: 30 January 1998 (age 28) Rio de Janeiro, RJ
- Height: 183 cm (6 ft 0 in)
- Weight: 90 kg (198 lb)
Medal record
Men's recurve archery
Representing Brazil
World Championships
| Silver medal – second place | 2021 Yankton | Individual |
| Silver medal – second place | 2025 Gwangju | Individual |
| Bronze medal – third place | 2023 Berlin | Individual |
World Cup
| Gold medal – first place | 2023 Hermosillo | Individual |
| Silver medal – second place | 2025 Nanjing | Individual |
| Silver medal – second place | 2014 Lausanne | Individual |
| Bronze medal – third place | 2024 Tlaxcala | Individual |
Pan American Championships
| Gold medal – first place | 2021 Monterrey | Team |
| Gold medal – first place | 2021 Monterrey | Mixed team |
| Gold medal – first place | 2022 Santiago | Individual |
| Gold medal – first place | 2024 Medellín | Mixed team |
| Gold medal – first place | 2026 Tlaxcala | Individual |
| Silver medal – second place | 2018 Medellín | Mixed team |
| Silver medal – second place | 2021 Monterrey | Individual |
| Bronze medal – third place | 2022 Santiago | Mixed team |
| Bronze medal – third place | 2026 Tlaxcala | Mixed team |
Pan American Games
| Silver medal – second place | 2019 Lima | Individual |
| Silver medal – second place | 2023 Santiago | Mixed team |
| Bronze medal – third place | 2015 Toronto | Team |
| Bronze medal – third place | 2023 Santiago | Team |
South American Games
| Gold medal – first place | 2014 Santiago | Individual |
| Gold medal – first place | 2014 Santiago | Team |
| Gold medal – first place | 2014 Santiago | Mixed team |
| Gold medal – first place | 2022 Asunción | Team |
| Gold medal – first place | 2026 Santa Fe | Team |
| Gold medal – first place | 2026 Santa Fe | Mixed team |
| Silver medal – second place | 2022 Asunción | Individual |
| Silver medal – second place | 2022 Asunción | Mixed team |
| Silver medal – second place | 2026 Santa Fe | Individual |
Military World Games
| Gold medal – first place | 2019 Wuhan | Recurve mixed team |
Summer Youth Olympics
| Silver medal – second place | 2014 Nanjing | Individual |
World Youth Championships
| Gold medal – first place | 2015 Yankton | Cadet individual |
| Bronze medal – third place | 2015 Yankton | Cadet team |

Marcus Vinicius Carvalho Lopes D'Almeida (born 30 January 1998, in Rio de Janeiro) is a Brazilian athlete who competes in recurve archery. In February 2023, he became the first Brazilian to lead the world archery ranking in his category, the recurve bow.

== Career ==
D'Almeida first competed internationally in 2013, and in 2014 won three gold medals at the South American Games (where he broke all South American records for 1440 Rounds) and qualified for the 2014 Archery World Cup Final as the second highest qualifier, where he won a silver medal, losing to Brady Ellison in the final by shoot-off. His spectacular rise to the upper echelons of the sport while still a teenager has earned him the nickname, "Archery's Neymar".

He won a silver medal in the individual competition at the 2014 Summer Youth Olympics, in Nanjing, China, where he was the flagbearer for Brazil.

At the 2019 Pan American Games, he won the silver medal, losing only to Canadian Crispin Duenas, bronze medalist at the 2013 World Archery Championships, for a tight 6x4 score.

At the Olympic Games in Tokyo 2020, by beating Dutchman Sjef van den Berg and advancing to the round of 16, he obtained the best result of a Brazilian archer in the history of archery in the Olympics. He was eliminated in the round of 16 by Italian Mauro Nespoli, who finished with Olympic silver in this competition. Nespoli hit all the arrows in the most central part of the target (always getting 9 or 10 points).

In September 2021 he won the first medal in Brazil's history at the World Archery Championships. He won the silver medal, in a competition that featured all the medalists of the Tokyo Olympics.

In June 2022, he reached the 4th place in the world ranking after the title at the World Cup in Paris, where he defeated three Olympic champions, two of them South Koreans.

In February 2023, he became the first Brazilian to lead the world archery ranking in his category, the recurve bow. On May, he won his second title at a stage of the Archery World Cup with a win on the second stage in Shanghai. On August, at the 2023 World Archery Championships in Berlin, D'Almeida went on to win his second World Championships medal, with a bronze, defeating 6–4 Indonesia's Arif Dwi Pangestu. Two weeks later, he won a bronze medal at the 4th stage of the 2023 Archery World Cup in Paris and, onde 10 September, he won another gold medal on the Final World Cup stage in Hermosillo, Mexico, defeating at the final south korean Lee Woo-seok 6–4, the most important title of his career.

D'Almeida was named the best archer of the year in the world in 2023, by World Archery Federation. He also won the Brazilian Olympic Committee award for the best athlete in the country in 2023.

In June 2024, 1 month before the Olympics, he obtained a silver medal at the World Cup stage that took place in Antalya, Turkey, losing the final to South Korean three-time world champion Kim Woo-jin in the "tiebreaker arrow".

At the 2024 Olympic Games in Paris, he had problems in the ranking phase and qualified only in 17th place. This caused an "early final" between Marcus, number 1 in the world, and South Korean Kim Woo-Jin, number 2 in the world, to take place in the round of 16. Kim Woo-Jin was practically perfect, hitting almost all of his arrows in the center of the target, beating Marcus 7–1 and subsequently becoming the gold medalist of the competition.

In September 2025, at the 2025 World Archery Championships, he secured a rematch against South Korea's Kim Woo-Jin, eliminating his rival 6-4 in the third round, in the opponent's own homeland. He ended up winning the silver medal, his third in the world championships. He also led Brazil to a fourth place finish in the team event, losing to Japan in the bronze medal match.
