= Andrés Aguilar (archer) =

Chilean archer (born 1996)

Personal information
- Full name: Andrés Felipe Aguilar Gimpel
- Born: 7 December 1996 (age 29) Santiago, Chile
Medal record
Men's archery
Representing Chile
Pan American Games
Silver medal – second place	2019 Lima	Team
Bolivarian Games
Silver medal – second place	2017 Santa Marta	Team
Bronze medal – third place	2013 Trujillo	Individual
Bronze medal – third place	2022 Valledupar	Team
Bronze medal – third place	2025 Ayacucho-Lima	Team
Pan American Archery Championships
Silver medal – second place	2018 Medellín	Team

Andrés Felipe Aguilar Gimpel (born 7 December 1996) is a Chilean archer. He competed at the 2020 Summer Olympics in the individual competition.

In addition to the Olympics, Aguilar has also represented Chile at the Archery World Championships, Pan American Games, Pan American Archery Championships, and the Archery World Cup.
