= Crispin Duenas =

Canadian recurve archer

Personal information
- Full name: Crispin Nataniel Duenas
- Born: January 5, 1986 (age 40) North York, Ontario, Canada
- Height: 1.70 m (5 ft 7 in)
- Weight: 72 kg (159 lb)

Sport
- Sport: Archery
Medal record
World Championships
| Bronze medal – third place | 2013 Belek | Individual recurve |
Pan American Games
| Gold medal – first place | 2019 Lima | Individual |
| Gold medal – first place | 2019 Lima | Team |
| Silver medal – second place | 2007 Rio de Janeiro | Team |
| Silver medal – second place | 2011 Guadalajara | Individual |
World Cup
| Silver medal – second place | 2009 Santo Domingo | Individual |
| Bronze medal – third place | 2017 Berlin | Individual |
- Updated on September 2023

Crispin Natanie Duenas (born January 5, 1986) is a Canadian recurve archer who represented Canada at the 2008 Summer Olympics in Beijing, the 2012 Summer Olympics in London, the 2016 Summer Olympics in Rio de Janeiro, and the 2020 Summer Olympics in Tokyo.

Crispin is one of Canada's top male archers with a successful international career as both a cadet and junior. He holds degrees in physics and education from the University of Toronto.

== Career ==
=== 2008 Summer Olympics ===
At the 2008 Summer Olympics in Beijing, Duenas finished his ranking round with a total of 664 points. This gave him the 16th seed for the final competition bracket in which he faced Magnus Petersson in the first round. Both scored 108 points in the regular match, and they had to go to an extra round. In this extra round, Duenas scored 18 points, while Petersson advanced to the second round with 19 points.

Together with John David Burnes and Jason Lyon, he also took part in the team event. With his 664 score from the ranking round combined with the 644 of Burns and the 646 of Lyon, the Canadians were in 11th position after the ranking round. In the first round, they were beaten by the Italian team 219-217. Italy would go on to reach the final and win the silver medal.

=== 2012 Summer Olympics ===
At the 2012 Summer Olympics, Duenas only competed in the men's individual event. In the ranking round, he shot 678 to seed him 8th in the competition. However, Duenas lost to Ahmed El-Nemr in the first knockout round.

=== 2016 Summer Olympics ===
Duenas competed in the men's individual event at the 2016 Summer Olympics in Rio de Janeiro, shooting a 669 in the ranking round to seed him 18th overall. In the first round he defeated Marco Galiazzo of Italy, but lost in the second round to Zach Garrett of the United States.

=== 2020 Summer Olympics ===
In his fourth Olympic appearance Duenas competed in the men’s individual event at the 2020 Summer Olympics in Tokyo, postponed to 2021 due to the global COVID-19 pandemic. He seeded 16th after the ranking round with a score of 665, and ended with a final ranking of 9th place after losing in the third round to Florian Unruh of Germany. This was Canada’s best showing in archery at the Olympics since 1976.

== Accomplishments ==
2007

- Breaking and re-breaking national records in the FITA round
- Placing 17th individually at the world championship
- Anchoring the Canadian men's team to an 8th-place finish and qualifying the team for the Beijing Olympics
- Placed 6th in the El Salvador World Cup

2008

- 2nd in the 2008 Canadian Olympic trials
- 3rd Arizona Cup World Ranking event
- 2nd in the Ontario Spring Classic
- Member of the Canadian men's team to an 8th-place finish in Dominican Republic World Cup

2009

- 1st in the Ontario Spring Classic

2010

- 3rd in the Pan American Championships (men's individual recurve)

2013

- 3rd in 2013 World Archery Championships (men's individual recurve)

2014

- 1st in Recurve at Lancaster Archery Supply Classic (unofficial)
- 2nd in the Pan American Olympic Festival
