= Squash at the 2019 Pan American Games – Men's team =

Squash – Men's team at the 2019 Pan American Games
- Venue: CAR Voleibol en la Videna
- Dates: July 28–31
- Competitors: 36 from 12 nations

Medalists
Gold medal	Andrew Douglas; Chris Hanson; Todd Harrity	United States
Silver medal	Miguel Ángel Rodríguez; Andrés Herrera; Juan Camilo Vargas	Colombia
Bronze medal	Shawn Delierre; Nick Sachvie; Andrew Schnell	Canada
Bronze medal	Alfredo Ávila; César Salazar; Arturo Salazar	Mexico

The men's team squash event of the 2019 Pan American Games was held from July 28 – July 31 at the CAR Voleibol en la Videna in Lima, Peru. The defending Pan American Games champion is the team from Canada.

The United States team took the gold by defeating Colombia in the finals. Defending champion Canada and Mexico took home the bronze medals.

== Results ==
=== Round Robin ===
The round robin will be used as a qualification round. The 12 teams will be split into groups of three. All teams will advance to the round of 16. The following is the group results.

==== Pool A ====
Nation	Pld	W	L	GF	GA	PF	PA	Points
Mexico	2	2	0	15	4	192	117	4
Peru	2	1	1	12	9	193	167	2
Guatemala	2	0	2	3	17	106	208	0

==== Pool B ====
Nation	Pld	W	L	GF	GA	PF	PA	Points
Colombia	2	2	0	15	6	205	187	4
Brazil	2	1	1	14	6	209	162	2
Bermuda	2	0	2	2	18	138	203	0

==== Pool C ====
Nation	Pld	W	L	GF	GA	PF	PA	Points
United States	2	2	0	18	0	198	79	4
Jamaica	2	1	1	6	15	134	208	2
Chile	2	0	2	6	15	153	198	0

==== Pool D ====
Nation	Pld	W	L	GF	GA	PF	PA	Points
Canada	2	2	0	18	0	202	104	4
Argentina	2	1	1	9	13	184	190	2
El Salvador	2	0	2	4	18	142	234	0

== Playoffs ==
The following is the playoff results.

Round of 16
Bermuda	0
Argentina	2
Brazil	3
Chile	0
El Salvador	0
Peru	2
Jamaica	1
Guatemala	2

Quarterfinals
Mexico	2
Argentina	0
Brazil	0
United States	2
Canada	2
Peru	1
Guatemala	0
Colombia	2

Semifinals
Mexico (bronze)	1
United States	2
Canada (bronze)	0
Colombia	2

Gold medal match
United States (gold)	2
Colombia (silver)	1

=== 5th-8th place ===
The following is 5th-8th place round results.

5th-8th place
Argentina	1
Brazil	2
Peru	0 (WO)
Guatemala	2

5th place
Brazil	0
Guatemala	2
7th place
Argentina	3
Peru	0 (RET)

=== 9th-12th place ===
The following is 9th-12th place round results.

9th-12th place
Bermuda	1
Chile	2
El Salvador	0
Jamaica	2

9th place
Chile	0
Jamaica	2
11th place
Bermuda	1
El Salvador	2

== Final standings ==
Rank	Nation	Name
1st place, gold medalist(s)	United States	Andrew Douglas; Chris Hanson; Todd Harrity
2nd place, silver medalist(s)	Colombia	Miguel Ángel Rodríguez; Andrés Herrera; Juan Camilo Vargas
3rd place, bronze medalist(s)	Canada	Shawn Delierre; Nick Sachvie; Andrew Schnell
3rd place, bronze medalist(s)	Mexico	Alfredo Ávila; César Salazar; Arturo Salazar
5	Guatemala	Josué Enríquez; Alejandro Enríquez; Mauricio Sedano
6	Brazil	Rafael Alarcón; Pedro Mometto; Diego Tschick
7	Argentina	Robertino Pezzota; Leandro Romiglio; Gonzalo Miranda
8	Peru	Andrés Duany; Diego Elías; Alonso Escudero
9	Jamaica	Christopher Binnie; Bruce Burrowes; Lewis Walters
10	Chile	Maximiliano Camiruaga; Matías Lacroix Nova; Jaime Pinto
11	El Salvador	Israel Aguilar; José Mejia; Jose Porras Diaz
12	Bermuda	Noah Browne; Micah Franklin; Nicholas Kyme
