= Squash at the 2019 Pan American Games – Men's singles =

Squash – Men's singles at the 2019 Pan American Games
- Venue: CAR Voleibol en la Videna
- Dates: July 25–27
- Competitors: 23 from 12 nations

Medalists
| Gold medal | Diego Elías | Peru |
| Silver medal | Miguel Ángel Rodríguez | Colombia |
| Bronze medal | César Salazar | Mexico |
| Bronze medal | Roberto Pezzota | Argentina |

The men's singles squash event at the 2019 Pan American Games will be held from July 25 – July 27 at the CAR Voleibol en la Videna in Lima, Peru.

== Format ==
Each National Olympic Committee could enter a maximum of two athletes into the competition. The athletes will be drawn into an elimination stage draw. Once an athlete lost a match, they will be no longer able to compete. Each match will be contested as the best of five games.

== Results ==
=== Final ===
| Final |
| Diego Elías (PER) | 11 | 7 | 12 | 11 |
| Miguel Ángel Rodríguez (COL) | 6 | 11 | 10 | 8 |

=== Top half ===
Round of 32
Jose Porras Diaz (ESA) | 3 | 11 | 9 | 2
Edwin Franco (GUA) | 11 | 4 | 11 | 11
Maximiliano Camiruaga (CHI) | 8 | 12 | 11 | 11
Noah Browne (BER) | 11 | 10 | 3 | 5
Shawn Delierre (CAN) | 12 | 13 | 6 | 11
Pedro Mometto (BRA) | 10 | 11 | 11 | 4

Round of 16
Diego Elías (PER) | 11 | 11 | 11
Edwin Franco (GUA) | 4 | 7 | 7
Leandro Romiglio (ARG) | 4 | 7 | 3
Todd Harrity (USA) | 11 | 11 | 11
Christopher Binnie (JAM) | WD
Maximiliano Camiruaga (CHI)
Shawn Delierre (CAN) | 1 | 2 | 4
César Salazar (MEX) | 11 | 11 | 11

Quarterfinals
Diego Elías (PER) | 12 | 11 | 11
Todd Harrity (USA) | 10 | 5 | 5
Maximiliano Camiruaga (CHI) | 2 | 5 | 4
César Salazar (MEX) | 11 | 11 | 11

Semifinals
Diego Elías (PER) | 11 | 11 | 11
César Salazar (MEX) | 1 | 9 | 8

=== Bottom half ===
Round of 32
Micah Franklin (BER) | 6 | 11 | 11 | 11
Israel Aguilar (ESA) | 11 | 8 | 8 | 4
Jamie Pinto (CHI) | 7 | 11 | 11 | 11
Anthony Burrowes (JAM) | 11 | 5 | 3 | 6
Junior Franco (GUA) | 11 | 12 | 8 | 9 | 11
Diego Tschick (BRA) | 7 | 10 | 11 | 11 | 8
Nick Sachvie (CAN) | 11 | 11 | 11
Andres Duany Miro (PER) | 8 | 3 | 6

Round of 16
Arturo Salazar (MEX) | 11 | 11 | 11
Micah Franklin (BER) | 7 | 7 | 5
Jamie Pinto (CHI) | 7 | 5 | 5
Roberto Pezzota (ARG) | 11 | 11 | 11
Chris Hanson (USA) | 11 | 11 | 11
Junior Franco (GUA) | 4 | 2 | 2
Nick Sachvie (CAN) | 5 | 7 | 6
Miguel Ángel Rodríguez (COL) | 11 | 11 | 11

Quarterfinals
Arturo Salazar (MEX) | 12 | 5 | 11 | 11 | 11
Roberto Pezzota (ARG) | 14 | 11 | 5 | 6 | 13
Chris Hanson (USA) | 5 | 7 | 11
Miguel Ángel Rodríguez (COL) | 11 | 11 | 13

Semifinals
Roberto Pezzota (ARG) | 11 | 14 | 6 | 7
Miguel Ángel Rodríguez (COL) | 9 | 16 | 11 | 11
