= Squash at the 2019 Pan American Games – Men's doubles =

Squash – Men's doubles at the 2019 Pan American Games
- Venue: CAR Voleibol en la Videna
- Dates: 26 July – 28 July
- Competitors: 24 from 12 nations

Medalists
Gold medal	Todd Harrity; Chris Hanson	United States
Silver medal	Shawn Delierre; Nick Sachvie	Canada
Bronze medal	Arturo Salazar; César Salazar	Mexico
Bronze medal	Diego Elías; Alonso Escudero	Peru

The men's doubles squash event at the 2019 Pan American Games will be held from 26 July – 28 July at the CAR Voleibol en la Videna in Lima, Peru.

Each National Olympic Committee could enter a maximum of one pair into the competition. The athletes will be drawn into an elimination stage draw. Once a pair lost a match, they will be no longer able to compete. Each match will be contested as the best of three games.

== Results ==
=== Bracket ===
Round of 16
Christopher Binnie (JAM); Lewis Walters (JAM)	11	5	11
Josué Enríquez (GUA); Alejandro Enríquez (GUA)	10	11	5
Shawn Delierre (CAN); Nick Sachvie (CAN)	11	10	11
Israel Aguilar (ESA); José Mejia (ESA)	4	11	1
Maximiliano Camiruaga (CHI); Jaime Pinto (CHI)	11	7	2
Noah Browne (BER); Micah Franklin (BER)	9	11	11
Pedro Mometto (BRA); Rafael Alarçón (BRA)	3	2
Andrés Herrera (COL); Juan Camilo Vargas (COL)	11	11

Quarterfinals
Arturo Salazar (MEX); César Salazar (MEX)	11	11
Christopher Binnie (JAM); Lewis Walters (JAM)	10	2
Shawn Delierre (CAN); Nick Sachvie (CAN)	11	7	11
Robertino Pezzota (ARG); Leandro Romiglio (ARG)	5	11	10
Todd Harrity (USA); Chris Hanson (USA)	11	11
Noah Browne (BER); Micah Franklin (BER)	6	7
Andrés Herrera (COL); Juan Camilo Vargas (COL)	2	10
Diego Elías (PER); Alonso Escudero (PER)	11	11

Semifinals
Arturo Salazar (MEX); César Salazar (MEX)	11	7	5
Shawn Delierre (CAN); Nick Sachvie (CAN)	9	11	11
Todd Harrity (USA); Chris Hanson (USA)	11	11
Diego Elías (PER); Alonso Escudero (PER)	8	8

Final
Shawn Delierre (CAN); Nick Sachvie (CAN)	11	5	8
Todd Harrity (USA); Chris Hanson (USA)	6	11	11
