= Torneo Internacional PSA Sporta =

Squash tournament in Guatemala

Details
- Event name: Torneo Internacional PSA Sporta
- Location: Santa Catarina Pinula, Guatemala

Men's PSA World Tour
- Category: World Tour International 50
- Prize money: $50,000
- Most recent champion(s): (Colombia) Miguel Ángel Rodríguez
- Current: Torneo Internacional PSA Sporta 2017

The Torneo Internacional PSA Sporta is a squash tournament held in Santa Catarina Pinula, Guatemala in May. It is part of the PSA World Tour.

== Past Results ==
Year	Champion	Runner-up	Score in final
2018	(Colombia) Miguel Ángel Rodríguez	(Peru) Diego Elías	11-7, 11-5, 11-6
2017	(Egypt) Mohamed Abouelghar	(Egypt) Zahed Mohamed	11-6, 11-5, 11-3
2016	(Spain) Borja Golán	(Mexico) César Salazar	11-8, 13-11, 11-4
2015	(Egypt) Omar Mosaad	(Mexico) César Salazar	11-5, 8-11, 11-7, 11-6
2014	(Egypt) Marwan El Shorbagy	(Canada) Shawn Delierre	11-7, 11-8, 11-7
2013	(Colombia) Miguel Ángel Rodríguez	(South Africa) Stephen Coppinger	11-5, 9-11, 11-8, 11-0
2012	(Mexico) César Salazar	(Mexico) Arturo Salazar	11-4, 11-2, 11-4
2011	(Mexico) Arturo Salazar	(Mexico) Eric Gálvez	14-12, 11-8, 11-2
2010	(Mexico) Arturo Salazar	(Mexico) Eric Gálvez	11-2, 11-9, 6-11, 10-12, 11-6
2009	(Colombia) Miguel Ángel Rodríguez	(Mexico) Eric Gálvez	7-11, 11-8, 11-2, 11-2
2008	(Mexico) José Ángel Becerril	(Mexico) César Salazar	12-10, 11-6, 6-11, 5-11, 11-7
