= Squash at the 2011 Pan American Games – Men's team =

Squash – Men's team at the 2011 Pan American Games
- Venue: Squash Complex
- Dates: October 18–20
- Competitors: 33 from 11 nations

Medalists
Gold medal	Arturo Salazar; Eric Gálvez; César Salazar	Mexico
Silver medal	Shawn Delierre; Andrew Schnell; Shahier Razik	Canada
Bronze medal	Vinicius De Lima; Vinicius Rodrigues; Rafael Fernandes	Brazil
Bronze medal	Julian Illingworth; Christopher Gordon; Graham Bassett	United States

The men's team competition of the squash events at the 2011 Pan American Games will be held from October 18 to 20 at the Squash Complex in Guadalajara, Mexico. The defending Pan American Games champion is the team from Colombia (Javier Castilla, Miguel Rodríguez and Bernardo Samper).

== Round robin ==
The round robin will be used as a qualification round. The twelve teams will be split into groups of three or four. The top two teams from each group will advance to the first round of playoffs.

=== Pool A ===
Nation	Pld	W	L	GF	GA	PF	PA	Points
Mexico	2	2	0	15	3	181	103	2
United States	2	1	1	12	8	180	53	1
El Salvador	2	0	2	2	18	109	214	0

18 October; 10:00	Report	United States	3–0	El Salvador	Squash Complex
Score by game:
Julian Illingworth	3–1	Walter Weisskopf
Graham Bassett	3–1	José Molina
Christopher Gordon	3–0	Byron Garcia

18 October; 16:00	Report	Mexico	3–0	El Salvador	Squash Complex
Score by game:
Arturo Salazar	3–0	Walter Weisskopf
Eric Gálvez	3–0	José Molina
César Salazar	3–0	Byron Garcia

19 October; 15:00	Report	Mexico	2–1	United States	Squash Complex
Score by game:
Eric Gálvez	3–0	Graham Bassett
Arturo Salazar	3–0	Julian Illingworth
César Salazar (RET)	0–3	Christopher Gordon

=== Pool B ===
Nation	Pld	W	L	GF	GA	PF	PA	Points
Canada	3	3	0	27	4	326	176	3
Colombia	3	2	1	20	11	282	236	2
Chile	3	1	2	9	21	208	293	1
Guatemala	3	0	3	5	25	190	301	0

18 October; 10:00	Report	Canada	3–0	Chile	Squash Complex
Score by game:
Shahier Razik	3–0	Jaime Pinto
Andrew Schnell	3–0	Rafael Allendes
Shawn Delierre	3–0	Maximiliano Camiruaga

18 October; 13:00	Report	Colombia	3–0	Guatemala	Squash Complex
Score by game:
Miguel Rodríguez	3–0	Mauricio Sedano
Javier Castilla	3–0	Bryan Bonilla
Andrés Vargas	3–0	José Méndez

19 October; 9:00	Report	Canada	3–0	Guatemala	Squash Complex
Score by game:
Andrew Schnell	3–0	Bryan Bonilla
Shahier Razik	3–0	Mauricio Sedano
Shawn Delierre	3–2	José Méndez

19 October; 9:00	Report	Chile	0–3	Colombia	Squash Complex
Score by game:
Rafael Allendes	0–3	Javier Castilla
Jamie Pinto	1–3	Miguel Rodríguez
Maximiliano Camiruaga	1–3	Andrés Vargas

19 October; 15:00	Report	Canada	3–0	Colombia	Squash Complex
Score by game:
Andrew Schnell	3–1	Javier Castilla
Shahier Razik	3–0	Miguel Rodríguez
Shawn Delierre	3–0	Andrés Vargas

19 October; 19:00	Report	Guatemala	1–2	Chile	Squash Complex
Score by game:
Bryan Bonilla	3–1	Rafael Allendes
Mauricio Sedano	0–3	Bryan Bonilla
José Méndez	0–3	Maximiliano Camiruaga

=== Pool C ===
Nation	Pld	W	L	GF	GA	PF	PA	Points
Brazil	3	3	0	27	4	339	211	3
Argentina	3	2	1	19	16	314	313	2
Paraguay	3	1	2	9	23	242	319	1
Peru	3	0	3	9	21	247	297	0

18 October; 10:00	Report	Brazil	3–0	Paraguay	Squash Complex
Score by game:
Rafael Fernandes	3–0	Esteban Casarino
Vinicius De Lima	3–0	Nicolas Caballero
Vinicius Rodrigues	3–0	André L'Heureux

18 October; 13:00	Report	Argentina	2–1	Peru	Squash Complex
Score by game:
Gonzalo Miranda	0–3	Andrés Duany
Roberto Pezotta	3–0	Diego Elías
Hernán D'Arcangelo	3–1	Alonso Escudero

19 October; 9:00	Report	Brazil	3–0	Peru	Squash Complex
Score by game:
Vinicius De Lima	3–0	Diego Elías
Rafael Fernandes	3–0	Andrés Duany
Vinicius Rodrigues	3–0	Alonso Escudero

19 October; 9:00	Report	Paraguay	0–3	Argentina	Squash Complex
Score by game:
Nicolas Caballero	1–3	Roberto Pezotta
Esteban Casarino	2–3	Gonzalo Miranda
André L'Heureux	0–3	Hernán D'Arcangelo

19 October; 15:00	Report	Brazil	3–0	Argentina	Squash Complex
Score by game:
Vinicius De Lima	3–1	Roberto Pezotta
Rafael Fernandes	3–1	Gonzalo Miranda
Vinicius Rodrigues	3–2	Hernán D'Arcangelo

19 October; 19:00	Report	Peru	1–2	Paraguay	Squash Complex
Score by game:
Diego Elías	3–0	Nicolas Caballero
Andrés Duany	0–3	Esteban Casarino
Alonso Escudero	2–3	André L'Heureux

== Playoffs ==
Quarterfinals					Semifinals					Final
					A1	Mexico	0	3	3
B2	Colombia	3	1	1	C1	Brazil	3	0	0
C1	Brazil	1	3	3						A1	Mexico	3	1	3
C2	Argentina	2	0							B2	Canada	1	3	0
A2	United States	3	3		A2	United States	0	2
					B2	Canada	1	3

=== Quarterfinals ===
20 October; 11:00	Report	Colombia	1–2	Brazil	Squash Complex
Score by game:
Miguel Rodríguez	3–1	Rafael Fernandes
Andrés Vargas	1–3	Vinicius Rodrigues
Javier Castilla	1–3	Vinicius de Lima

20 October; 11:00	Report	Argentina	0–2	United States	Squash Complex
Score by game:
Gonzalo Miranda	2–3	Julian Illingworth
Hernán D'Arcangelo	0–3	Christopher Gordon

=== Semifinals ===
20 October; 15:00	Report	Mexico	2–1	Brazil	Squash Complex
Score by game:
Arturo Salazar	0–3	Rafael Fernandes
César Salazar	3–0	Vinicius Rodrigues
Eric Gálvez	3–0	Vinicius de Lima

20 October; 15:00	Report	United States	0–2	Canada	Squash Complex
Score by game:
Julian Illingworth (ret.)	0–1	Shahier Razik
Christopher Gordon	2–3	Shawn Delierre

=== Final ===
21 October; 15:00	Report	Mexico	2–1	Canada	Squash Complex
Score by game:
César Salazar	3–1	Shawn Delierre
Arturo Salazar	1–3	Shahier Razik
Eric Gálvez	3–0	Andrew Schnell
