= Torneo Internacional PSA Sporta 2016 =

- 9th Torneo Internacional PSA Sporta

Details
- Event name: Sporta IX Torneo Internacional PSA Sporta 2016
- Location: Santa Catarina Pinula, Guatemala
- Website www.squashsite.co.uk/2016/sporta2016.htm

Men's Winner
- Category: International 50
- Prize money: $50,000
- Year: World Tour 2016

The Torneo Internacional PSA Sporta 2016 is the men's edition of the 2016 Torneo Internacional PSA Sporta, which is a tournament of the PSA World Tour event International (prize money: $50,000). The event took place in Santa Catarina Pinula in Guatemala from 18 September to 21 May. Borja Golán won his first Torneo Internacional PSA Sporta trophy, beating César Salazar in the final.

== Prize money and ranking points ==
For 2016, the prize purse was $ 50,000. The prize money and points breakdown was as follows:

Prize money Torneo Internacional PSA Sporta (2016)
Event	W	F	SF	QF	1R
Points (PSA)	875	575	350	215	125
Prize money	$ 8,075	$ 5,525	$ 3,615	$ 2,230	$ 1,275

== Seeds ==
1. (Egypt) Marwan El Shorbagy (first round)
2. (Spain) Borja Golán (champion)
3. (Egypt) Mazen Hesham (semifinals)
4. (Egypt) Mohamed Abouelghar (first round)
5. (South Africa) Stephen Coppinger (quarterfinals)
6. (Egypt) Zahed Mohamed (quarterfinals)
7. (Egypt) Omar Abdel Meguid (quarterfinals)
8. (Mexico) César Salazar (final)

== Draw and results ==
First round
1	(Egypt) Marwan El Shorbagy	13	3	9
(Peru) Diego Elías	15	11	11
Q	(Finland) Henrik Mustonen	2	5	5
8	(Mexico) César Salazar	11	11	11
6	(Egypt) Zahed Mohamed	11	11	11
WC	(England) Eddie Charlton	6	5	8
(Mexico) Alfredo Ávila	11	6	13	12
4	(Egypt) Mohd Abouelghar	6	11	11	10
3	(Egypt) Mazen Hesham	11	11	11	11
(Jamaica) Christopher Binnie	13	7	6	7
(Scotland) Greg Lobban	8	9	4
5	(South Africa) Stephen Coppinger	11	11	11
7	(Egypt) Omar Abdel Meguid	16	11	11
Q	(New Zealand) Campbell Grayson	14	6	10
Q	(Mexico) Arturo Salazar	11	6	8	11	8
2	(Spain) Borja Golán	7	11	11	6	11

Quarter finals
(Peru) Diego Elías	11	4	3	3
8	(Mexico) César Salazar	7	11	11	11
6	(Egypt) Zahed Mohamed	11	5	7	11	11
(Mexico) Alfredo Ávila	9	11	11	5	4
3	(Egypt) Mazen Hesham	4	11	4	11	11
5	(South Africa) Stephen Coppinger	11	8	11	5	4
7	(Egypt) Omar Abdel Meguid	11	13	12	6
2	(Spain) Borja Golán	7	15	14	11

Semi finals
8	(Mexico) César Salazar	6	6	11	11	11
6	(Egypt) Zahed Mohamed	11	11	4	7	8
3	(Egypt) Mazen Hesham	8	7	5
2	(Spain) Borja Golán	11	11	11

Final
8	(Mexico) César Salazar	8	11	4
2	(Spain) Borja Golán	11	13	11

== See also ==
- 2016 PSA World Tour
- Torneo Internacional PSA Sporta
