= Archery at the 2019 Pan American Games – Qualification =

The following is the qualification system and qualified athletes, countries and teams for the Archery at the 2019 Pan American Games competitions.

== Qualification system ==
A total of 84 archers will qualify to compete at the games (42 per gender). A country may enter a maximum of eight archers (four per gender). As host nation, Peru qualifies four athletes automatically (one per individual event). Two qualification tournaments were used to determine the 62 qualifiers in recurve and 18 in compound.

=== Recurve ===
A country may enter a maximum of three recurve athletes per gender (for a maximum of six total). As host, Peru automatically receives one quota per gender. At the first qualification tournament, the top six teams in the team event qualify along with four individuals per gender. At the second qualification tournament, the top two team along with three individuals will qualify per gender. If a country that won an individual quota(s) at the first tournament, wins a team quota at the second tournament, those individual spots will be reallocated to the second qualification individual event.

=== Compound ===
A total of ten archers per gender will qualify. As host, Peru automatically receives one quota per gender. The top four mixed teams in the first qualification tournament will qualify along with three individuals per gender. The remaining two spots per gender will be decided at the second qualification tournament.

== Qualification timeline ==
Events	Date	Venue
2018 Pan American Archery Championships	August 14–19, 2018	(Colombia) Medellín
2nd Qualification Tournament	April 2–9, 2019	(Chile) Santiago

== Qualification summary ==
Nation	Men			Women			Mixed		Total
Nation	I. recurve	T. recurve	I. compound	I. recurve	T. recurve	I. compound	T. recurve	T. compound	Athletes
Argentina	2		1	2		1		X	6
Bolivia				3	X				3
Brazil	3	X	1	3	X	1	X	X	8
Canada	3	X		3	X	1	X		7
Chile	3	X		3	X		X		6
Colombia	3	X	1	3	X	1	X	X	8
Cuba	3	X		3	X		X		6
Dominican Republic				1					1
Ecuador	2		1						3
El Salvador	1		1	1					3
Guatemala	3	X	1	1		1	X	X	6
Mexico	3	X	1	3	X	1	X	X	8
Peru	1		1	2		1		X	5
Puerto Rico			1			1		X	2
Trinidad and Tobago	1								1
United States	3	X	1	3	X	1	X	X	8
Venezuela	1			1		1			3
Total: 17 NOCs	32	8	10	32	8	10	8	8	84

== Recurve men ==
Event	Qualified	Archers per NOC	Total
Host nation	Peru	1	1
2018 Pan American Championships team event	United States; Chile; Colombia; Guatemala; Cuba; Mexico	3	18
2018 Pan American Championships individual event	~~Brazil~~; ~~Canada~~; El Salvador; Trinidad and Tobago	1	~~4~~ 2
2nd Qualification Tournament team event	Brazil; Canada	3	6
2nd Qualification Tournament individual event	Venezuela; Argentina; Ecuador; Argentina; Ecuador	1	~~3~~ 5
TOTAL			32

== Recurve women ==
Event	Qualified	Archers per NOC	Total
Host nation	Peru	1	1
2018 Pan American Championships team event	Mexico; United States; Brazil; Colombia; Chile; Bolivia	3	18
2018 Pan American Championships individual event	~~Canada~~; Argentina; ~~Cuba~~; Guatemala	1	~~4~~ 2
2nd Qualification Tournament team event	Cuba; Canada	3	6
2nd Qualification Tournament individual event	Venezuela; Dominican Republic; El Salvador; Argentina; Peru	1	~~3~~ 5
TOTAL			32

== Compound men ==
Event	Qualified	Archers per NOC	Total
Host nation	Peru	1	1
2018 Pan American Championships mixed team event	United States; Colombia; Mexico; Puerto Rico	1	4
2018 Pan American Championships individual event	El Salvador; Guatemala; Brazil	1	3
2nd Qualification Tournament individual event	Ecuador; Argentina	1	2
TOTAL			10

== Compound women ==
Event	Qualified	Archers per NOC	Total
Host nation	Peru	1	1
2018 Pan American Championships mixed team event	United States; Colombia; Mexico; Puerto Rico	1	4
2018 Pan American Championships individual event	Argentina; Guatemala; Canada	1	3
2nd Qualification Tournament individual event	Brazil; Venezuela	1	2
TOTAL			10
