= Swimming at the 2019 Pan American Games – Qualification =

The following is the qualification system and qualified athletes for the swimming at the 2019 Pan American Games competitions.

== Qualification system ==
A total of 350 swimmers will qualify in the pool and a total of 40 additional open water swimmers will qualify as well. As Host Country, Peru automatically will qualify 18 male and 18 female competitors in the pool. Each National Olympic Committee may use proven swim times attained during the qualification period of those swimmers who have met the qualifying standards established by the UANA for the 2019 Pan American Games at a competition recognized by the FINA from the official list of approved qualifying competitions for the 18th FINA World Aquatics Championships held in Gwangju, Korea. Each event (besides the relays) has an A standard (two entries allowed) or a B standard (one entry allowed). Countries not qualified can enter one male and one female swimmer through the universality rule. In open water, Canada and the USA automatically qualify two per gender, with eight spots being awarded in each gender to CONSANAT and CCCAN.

== Swimming qualification times ==
The time standards (all long course) for the 2019 Pan American Games are:

| Male | | Event | Female | |
| A standard (2 entries) | B standard (1 entry) | Event | A standard (2 entries) | B standard (1 entry) |
| 22.68 | 24.07 | 50 freestyle | 25.89 | 27.44 |
| 49.80 | 52.79 | 100 freestyle | 56.56 | 59.95 |
| 1:49.66 | 1:56.24 | 200 freestyle | 2:03.55 | 2:10.96 |
| 3:54.44 | 4:08.51 | 400 freestyle | 4:16.91 | 4:32.33 |
| 8:10.19 | 8:39.60 | 800 freestyle | 8:50.99 | 9:24.97 |
| 15:43.36 | 16:39.97 | 1500 freestyle | 16:50.89 | 17:51.54 |
| 56.49 | 59.99 | 100 backstroke | 1:03.36 | 1:07.17 |
| 2:02.89 | 2:10.26 | 200 backstroke | 2:18.45 | 2:26.76 |
| 1:02.26 | 1:06.00 | 100 breaststroke | 1:11.11 | 1:15.38 |
| 2:17.52 | 2:25.79 | 200 breaststroke | 2:34.43 | 2:43.79 |
| 53.73 | 56.95 | 100 butterfly | 1:01.25 | 1:04.93 |
| 2:00.54 | 2:07.77 | 200 butterfly | 2:14.13 | 2:22.19 |
| 2:04.43 | 2:11.90 | 200 individual medley | 2:19.99 | 2:28.92 |
| 4:27.69 | 4:43.79 | 400 individual medley | 4:57.99 | 5:17.99 |

== Swimming ==
A total of 37 countries qualified swimmers or received universality spots. Only 326 of 350 quota spots were distributed. A total of 167 male swimmers and 159 swimmers were entered.

| NOC | Men | Women | Athletes |
|---|---|---|---|
| Antigua and Barbuda | 1 | 1 | 2 |
| Argentina | 11 | 6 | 17 |
| Aruba | 2 | 1 | 3 |
| Bahamas | 6 | 4 | 10 |
| Barbados | 3 | 2 | 5 |
| Bermuda | 1 | 2 | 3 |
| Bolivia | 3 | 1 | 4 |
| Brazil | 18 | 17 | 35 |
| Canada | 2 | 14 | 16 |
| Cayman Islands | 2 | 1 | 3 |
| Chile | 5 | 4 | 9 |
| Colombia | 8 | 6 | 14 |
| Costa Rica | 2 | 1 | 3 |
| Cuba | 7 | 5 | 12 |
| Dominican Republic | 1 | 1 | 2 |
| Ecuador | 5 | 4 | 9 |
| El Salvador | 1 | 2 | 3 |
| Grenada | 1 | 1 | 2 |
| Guatemala | 2 | 2 | 4 |
| Guyana | 1 | 1 | 2 |
| Haiti | 1 | 1 | 2 |
| Honduras | 3 | 4 | 7 |
| Jamaica | 1 | 1 | 2 |
| Mexico | 11 | 11 | 22 |
| Nicaragua | 2 | 2 | 4 |
| Panama | 4 | 5 | 9 |
| Paraguay | 5 | 4 | 9 |
| Peru | 15 | 15 | 30 |
| Puerto Rico | 4 | 3 | 7 |
| Saint Lucia | 1 | 0 | 1 |
| Saint Vincent and the Grenadines | 1 | 1 | 2 |
| Suriname | 1 | 1 | 2 |
| Trinidad and Tobago | 3 | 3 | 6 |
| United States | 18 | 18 | 36 |
| Uruguay | 2 | 3 | 5 |
| Venezuela | 11 | 10 | 21 |
| Virgin Islands | 2 | 1 | 3 |
| Total: 37 NOC's | 167 | 159 | 326 |

== Open water swimming ==
=== Qualification timeline ===
| Event | Date | Venue |
|---|---|---|
| 2018 Central American and Caribbean Games | July 28–29 | (Colombia) Barranquilla |
| 2018 South American Championships | November 2 | (Peru) Lake Bujama |
| Canadian Ranking | April 27, 2019 | (Canada) Ottawa |
| USA Qualifier | May 3, 2019 | (United States) Miami |

=== Summary ===
| NOC | Men | Women | Athletes |
|---|---|---|---|
| Argentina | 2 | 2 | 4 |
| Brazil | 2 | 2 | 4 |
| Canada | 2 | 2 | 4 |
| Chile | | 1 | 1 |
| Costa Rica | 1 | | 1 |
| Cuba | 2 | 2 | 4 |
| Ecuador | 2 | 1 | 3 |
| El Salvador | 1 | 1 | 2 |
| Guatemala | 2 | 2 | 4 |
| Mexico | 2 | 2 | 4 |
| Peru | 1 | 1 | 2 |
| Trinidad and Tobago | | 1 | 1 |
| United States | 2 | 2 | 4 |
| Venezuela | 1 | 1 | 2 |
| Total: 14 NOC's | 20 | 20 | 40 |

=== Qualified swimmers ===
The following countries earned quotas:

| Event | Quotas | Men | Women |
|---|---|---|---|
| Canada | 2/2 | Canada; Canada | Canada; Canada |
| United States | 2/2 | United States; United States | United States; United States |
| Caribbean/Central America | 8/8 | Costa Rica; Cuba; Cuba; El Salvador; Guatemala; Guatemala; Mexico; Mexico | Cuba; Cuba; El Salvador; Guatemala; Guatemala; Mexico; Mexico; Trinidad and Tobago |
| South America | 8/8 | Argentina; Argentina; Brazil; Brazil; Ecuador; Ecuador; Peru; Venezuela | Argentina; Argentina; Brazil; Brazil; Chile; Ecuador; Peru; Venezuela |
| Total | 40 | 20 | 20 |
