= Squash at the 2011 Pan American Games – Men's singles =

Squash – Men's singles at the 2011 Pan American Games
- Venue: Squash Complex
- Dates: October 15–17
- Competitors: 24 from 13 nations

Medalists
Gold medal	Miguel Ángel Rodríguez	Colombia
Silver medal	César Salazar	Mexico
Bronze medal	Arturo Salazar	Mexico
Bronze medal	Shawn Delierre	Canada

The men's singles squash event of the 2011 Pan American Games will be held from October 15–17 at the Squash Complex in Guadalajara. The defending Pan American Games champion is Eric Gálvez of Mexico.

The athletes will be drawn into elimination stage draw. Once an athlete loses a match, they will no longer be able to compete. Each match is contested as the best of five games. A game is won when one side first scores 11 points. A point is awarded to the winning side of each rally. If the score becomes 10-all, the side which gains a two-point lead first, will win that game.

== Draw ==
=== Finals ===
Semifinals
C Salazar (MEX)	11	11	11
A Salazar (MEX)	2	8	2
S Delierre (CAN)	7	3	7
M Rodríguez (COL)	11	11	11

Final
C Salazar (MEX)	7	9	4
M Rodríguez (COL)	11	11	11

=== Top half ===
First Round
W Weisskopf (ESA)	11	7	2	11	3
G Bassett (USA)	7	11	11	5	11
V Rodrigues (BRA)	11	4	11	12
M Camiruaga (CHI)	7	11	6	10
C Casarino (PAR)	11	11	7	11
A Vargas (COL)	6	8	11	4
C Binnie (JAM)	11	11	13
J Mendez (GUA)	5	4	11

Second Round
S Razik (CAN)	11	11	11
G Bassett (USA)	5	5	5
C Salazar (MEX)	11	11	11
V Rodrigues (BRA)	6	7	8
A Salazar (MEX)	11	11	11
C Casarino (PAR)	6	4	2
C Gordon (USA)	11	11	11
C Binnie (JAM)	7	5	5

Quarterfinals
S Razik (CAN)	9	3	4
C Salazar (MEX)	11	11	11
A Salazar (MEX)	10	11	11	12
C Gordon (USA)	12	4	5	10

Semifinals
C Salazar (MEX)	11	11	11
A Salazar (MEX)	2	8	2

=== Bottom half ===
First Round
M Sedano (GUA)	7	7	8
J Pinto (CHI)	11	11	11
A L'Heureux (PAR)	7	11	5	11	11
Shawn Simpson (BAR)	11	4	11	6	2
B Garica (ESA)	3	2	10
A Duany (PER)	11	11	12
A Escudero (PER)	11	4	3
H D'Arcangelo (ARG)	13	11	11

Second Round
J Pinto (CHI)	11	9	2	11	6
R Fernandes (BRA)	9	11	11	5	11
A L'Heureux (PAR)	0	3	7
S Delierre (CAN)	11	11	11
A Duany (PER)	4	7	3
G Miranda (ARG)	11	11	11
H D'Arcangelo (ARG)	7	7	9
M Rodríguez (COL)	11	11	11

Quarterfinals
R Fernandes (BRA)	7	11	9	7
S Delierre (CAN)	11	8	11	11
G Miranda (ARG)	13	3	2
M Rodríguez (COL)	15	11	11

Semifinals
S Delierre (CAN)	7	3	7
M Rodríguez (COL)	11	11	11
