= Gymnastics at the 2019 Pan American Games – Qualification =

The following is the qualification system and qualified gymnasts for the Gymnastics at the 2019 Pan American Games competition to be held in Lima, Peru.

== Qualification timeline ==
Event	Date	Venue
2018 Pan American Gymnastics Championships	September 7–30, 2018	(Peru) Lima

== Qualification summary ==
*In Artistic Gymnastics, NOCs with 5 entered gymnasts may also enter the team competition.

Nation	Artistic		Rhythmic		Trampoline		Total
Nation	Men	Women	Individual	Group	Men	Women	Total
Argentina	5	5	2		1	2	15
Bolivia	1	1					2
Brazil	5	5	2	5	1	2	20
Canada	5	5	2	5	2	2	21
Cayman Islands		1					1
Chile	2	5	1		1		9
Colombia	5	2	2		1	1	11
Costa Rica	2	2					4
Cuba	5	5	1	5	1		17
Dominican Republic	1	2				1	3
Ecuador	1						1
El Salvador	1	1					2
Guatemala	1	1					2
Jamaica	2	2					4
Mexico	5	5	2	5	2	1	20
Panama		1					1
Peru	2	2			1		5
Puerto Rico	2	5	1				8
Trinidad and Tobago	1						1
United States	5	5	2	5	2	2	21
Uruguay	1	1					2
Venezuela	5	1	1	5		1	13
Total: 22 NOCs	57	57	16	30	12	12	184

== Artistic ==
The top eight teams in each event qualified five gymnasts each. Teams 9-13 each qualified two gymnasts each. A further seven spots were available (per gender) for individual qualification (with a maximum of one quota per gender per nation).

=== Men ===
Event	Criterion	Qualified	Gymnasts per NOC	Total
2018 Pan American Championship	Teams 1–8	Cuba; United States; Brazil; Canada; Colombia; Mexico; Venezuela; Argentina	5	40
2018 Pan American Championship	Teams places 9–13	Puerto Rico; Peru; Costa Rica; Chile; Jamaica	2	10
2018 Pan American Championship	Individual all around top 7 countries not already qualified	Dominican Republic; Guatemala; Uruguay; Trinidad and Tobago; Ecuador; El Salvador; Bolivia	1	7
TOTAL				57

=== Women ===
Event	Criterion	Qualified	Gymnasts per NOC	Total
2018 Pan American Championship	Teams 1–8	United States; Brazil; Mexico; Argentina; Cuba; Canada; Chile; Puerto Rico	5	40
2018 Pan American Championship	Teams places 9–13	Colombia; Costa Rica; Jamaica; Peru; Dominican Republic	2	10
2018 Pan American Championship	Individual all around top 7 countries not already qualified	Guatemala; Venezuela; Bolivia; El Salvador; Cayman Islands; Uruguay; Panama	1	7
TOTAL				57

== Rhythmic ==
The top six nations in the individual event at the Pan American Championship qualified two gymnasts. The last four spots went to the top four nations in the individual event, that have not earned any quotas (each with one gymnast). The top six nations in the group event also qualified, with each group consisting of 5 gymnasts. If the host nation has not qualified, the organizing committee will need to provide an additional quota for the country to compete.

=== Individual ===
Event	Gymnasts per NOC	Qualified
2018 Pan American Championship individual event	2	United States; Mexico; Brazil; Canada; Colombia; Argentina
2018 Pan American Championship individual event	1	Puerto Rico; Venezuela; Cuba; Chile
TOTAL	16	

=== Group ===
Event	Criterion	Qualified
2018 Pan American Championship group event	Top 6	Mexico; United States; Brazil; Canada; Cuba; Venezuela
TOTAL	6	

== Trampoline ==
The top three countries, defined by the top two results of the individual event at the Pan American Championship qualified two gymnasts in each respective event. The last six spots in each event went to the top six nations in the individual event, that have not earned any quotas. The host nation Peru is guaranteed a quota if it does not qualify and would take the place of the 12th place ranked athlete.

=== Men ===
Peru did not finish in the top 12 spots, and its best placed athlete was awarded the final slot.

Event	Gymnasts per NOC	Total	Qualified
2018 Pan American Championship individual event	2	6	United States; Canada; Mexico
2018 Pan American Championship individual event	1	5	Colombia; Brazil; Argentina; Cuba; Chile
Host nation	1	1	Peru
TOTAL		12	

=== Women ===
Only 8 nations competed in the qualification tournament, which meant the fourth placed nation received an extra quota spot.

Event	Gymnasts per NOC	Total	Qualified
2018 Pan American Championship individual event	2	8	Canada; United States; Brazil; Argentina
2018 Pan American Championship individual event	1	4	Mexico; Venezuela; Dominican Republic; Colombia
TOTAL		12	
