= Squash at the 2019 Pan American Games – Qualification =

The following is the qualification system and qualified countries for the Squash at the 2019 Pan American Games competition in Lima, Peru.

== Qualification system ==
A total of 60 squash athletes (36 men and 24 women) qualified to compete. Each nation may enter a maximum of 6 athletes (three per gender). The host nation, Peru automatically qualified the maximum team size. The top eleven men's team (of three athletes) and top seven women's teams (of three athletes), excluding Peru, at the 2018 Pan American Championships also qualified.

== Qualification timeline ==
Event	Date	Venue
2018 Pan American Squash Championships	August 26 – September 1, 2018	(Cayman Islands) George Town

== Qualification summary ==
Nation	Men			Women			Mixed	Total
Nation	Individual	Doubles	Team	Individual	Doubles	Team	Doubles	Athletes
Argentina	2	1	X	2	1	X	X	6
Bermuda	2	1	X					3
Brazil	2	1	X					3
Canada	2	1	X	2	1	X	X	6
Chile	2	1	X	2	1	X	X	6
Colombia	2	1	X	2	1	X	X	6
El Salvador	2	1	X					3
Guatemala	2	1	X					3
Guyana				2	1	X		3
Jamaica	2	1	X					3
Mexico	2	1	X	2	1	X	X	6
Peru	2	1	X	2	1	X	X	6
United States	2	1	X	2	1	X	X	6
Total: 13 NOCs	24	12	12	16	8	8	7	60

== Men ==
Event	Criterion	Qualified	Athletes per NOC	Total
Host nation	—N/a	Peru	3	3
2018 Pan American Championships	Top 11 (besides host nation)	Mexico; Colombia; Canada; United States; Brazil; Argentina; Jamaica; Guatemala; El Salvador; Chile; Bermuda	3	33
TOTAL				36

== Women ==
Event	Criterion	Qualified	Athletes per NOC	Total
Host nation	—N/a	Peru	3	3
2018 Pan American Championships	Top 7 (besides host nation)	United States; Canada; Colombia; Mexico; Chile; Guyana; Argentina	3	21
TOTAL				24
