= Bodybuilding at the 2019 Pan American Games – Qualification =

The following is the qualification system and qualified athletes for the bodybuilding at the 2019 Pan American Games competitions.

== Qualification system ==
A total of 32 athletes qualified. The top 15 athletes (one per nation) after reallocation and the host nation Peru, qualified in each event. Qualification was done at the 2018 Pan American Championships held in Antigua, Guatemala in November.

== Qualification timeline ==
Events	Date	Venue
2018 Pan American Bodybuilding Championships	November 20–25, 2018	Antigua, Guatemala

== Qualification summary ==
NOC	Men	Women	Total
Argentina		1	1
Belize	1		1
Bolivia	1	1	2
Brazil	1	1	2
Chile	1		1
Colombia	1	1	2
Costa Rica	1		1
Dominican Republic	1	1	2
Ecuador	1	1	2
El Salvador	1	1	2
Guatemala	1	1	2
Honduras	1	1	2
Jamaica		1	1
Mexico	1	1	2
Nicaragua	1	1	2
Paraguay		1	1
Peru	1	1	2
Uruguay	1	1	2
Venezuela	1	1	2
Total: 19 NOCs	16	16	32

== Qualified NOC's ==
Event	Qualified Men	Qualified Women
Host nation	Peru	Peru
2018 Pan American Championship	Belize; Bolivia; Brazil; Chile; Colombia; Costa Rica; Dominican Republic; Ecuador; El Salvador; Guatemala; Honduras; Mexico; Nicaragua; Uruguay; Venezuela	Argentina; Bolivia; Brazil; Colombia; Dominican Republic; Ecuador; El Salvador; Guatemala; Honduras; Jamaica; Mexico; Nicaragua; Paraguay; Uruguay; Venezuela
TOTAL	16	16

- Countries are listed in alphabetical order after qualification and reallocation.
