= Basque pelota at the 2019 Pan American Games – Men's individual fronton rubber ball =

Basque pelota – Men's individual fronton rubber ball at the 2019 Pan American Games
- Venue: Villa María del Triunfo Center
- Dates: 4–10 August
- Competitors: 10 from 10 nations

Medalists
Gold medal	Arturo Rodriguez	Mexico
Silver medal	Facundo Andreasen	Argentina
Bronze medal	Alejandro Gonzalez	Cuba

The men's individual fronton rubber ball basque pelota event at the 2019 Pan American Games was held from 4–10 August at the Basque pelota courts in the Villa María del Triunfo Sports Center in Lima, Peru. Arturo Rodriguez won the gold medal, after defeating Facundo Andreasen in the final.

== Results ==
=== Preliminary round ===
The preliminary stage consisted of 2 pools where every competitor played each other competitor in the same pool once. At the end of this stage, the first two teams from each pool played in the semifinals, and then the medal round.

==== Pool A ====
Pos	Team	Pld	W	L	PF	PA	PD	Pts
1	Mexico Arturo Rodriguez	4	4	0	120	32	+88	12
2	Uruguay Braian Ramirez Mesa	4	3	1	97	60	+37	10
3	Guatemala Juan Blas Fernandez	4	2	2	77	100	−23	8
4	Venezuela Jaime Vera	4	1	3	77	119	−42	6
5	United States Rolando Tejeda	4	0	4	65	125	−60	4

Updated to match(es) played on 17 September 2019. Source: Lima 2019

All times are local (UTC-5)

4 August; 15:28	Arturo Rodriguez (Mexico)	2–0	(Venezuela) Jaime Vera	Villa María del Triunfo Sports Center; Referees: Roberto Andrés Caballero (CHI)
4 August; 15:28	(15–4, 15–3); Report			Villa María del Triunfo Sports Center; Referees: Roberto Andrés Caballero (CHI)

4 August; 16:55	Braian Ramirez Mesa (Uruguay)	2–0	(United States) Rolando Tejeda	Villa María del Triunfo Sports Center; Referees: Roberto Andrés Jara (CHI)
4 August; 16:55	(15–4, 15–4); Report			Villa María del Triunfo Sports Center; Referees: Roberto Andrés Jara (CHI)

5 August; 16:11	Arturo Rodriguez (Mexico)	2–0	(Uruguay) Braian Ramirez Mesa	Villa María del Triunfo Sports Center; Referees: Jorge Luis Balbi (ARG)
5 August; 16:11	(15–3, 15–4); Report			Villa María del Triunfo Sports Center; Referees: Jorge Luis Balbi (ARG)

5 August; 17:44	Jaime Vera (Venezuela)	0-2	(Guatemala) Juan Blas Fernandez	Villa María del Triunfo Sports Center; Referees: Jorge Luis Balbi (ARG)
5 August; 17:44	(10-15, 10-15); Report			Villa María del Triunfo Sports Center; Referees: Jorge Luis Balbi (ARG)

6 August; 14:26	Rolando Tejeda (United States)	1-2	(Venezuela) Jaime Vera	Villa María del Triunfo Sports Center; Referees: Alfonso Franco Romero (CHI)
6 August; 14:26	(12-15, 15-10, 2-10); Report			Villa María del Triunfo Sports Center; Referees: Alfonso Franco Romero (CHI)

6 August; 16:03	Juan Blas Fernandez (Guatemala)	0-2	(Mexico) Arturo Rodriguez	Villa María del Triunfo Sports Center; Referees: Roberto Andrés Jara (CHI)
6 August; 16:03	(6-15, 4-15); Report			Villa María del Triunfo Sports Center; Referees: Roberto Andrés Jara (CHI)

7 August; 14:02	Arturo Rodriguez (Mexico)	2-0	(United States) Rolando Tejeda	Villa María del Triunfo Sports Center; Referees: Dardo Heber Ferreira (URU)
7 August; 14:02	(15-3, 15-5); Report			Villa María del Triunfo Sports Center; Referees: Dardo Heber Ferreira (URU)

7 August; 15:02	Braian Ramirez Mesa (Uruguay)	2-0	(Guatemala) Juan Blas Fernandez	Villa María del Triunfo Sports Center; Referees: Andrés Emilio Caballero (CUB)
7 August; 15:02	(15-5, 15-2); Report			Villa María del Triunfo Sports Center; Referees: Andrés Emilio Caballero (CUB)

8 August; 15:51	Jaime Vera (Venezuela)	0-2	(Uruguay) Braian Ramirez Mesa	Villa María del Triunfo Sports Center; Referees: Roberto Andrés Jara (CHI)
8 August; 15:51	(12-15, 3-15); Report			Villa María del Triunfo Sports Center; Referees: Roberto Andrés Jara (CHI)

8 August; 17:32	Rolando Tejeda (United States)	0-2	(Guatemala) Juan Blas Fernandez	Villa María del Triunfo Sports Center; Referees: Dardo Heber Ferreira (URU)
8 August; 17:32	(8-15, 12-15); Report			Villa María del Triunfo Sports Center; Referees: Dardo Heber Ferreira (URU)

==== Pool B ====
Pos	Team	Pld	W	L	PF	PA	PD	Pts
1	Argentina Facundo Andreasen	4	4	0	120	32	+88	12
2	Cuba Alejandro González	4	3	1	97	60	+37	10
3	Peru Rodrigo Carrasco Pro	4	2	2	77	100	−23	8
4	El Salvador Efrain Segura	4	1	3	77	119	−42	6
5	Chile Martín Letelier	4	0	4	65	125	−60	4

Updated to match(es) played on 17 September 2019. Source: Lima 2019

All times are local (UTC-5)

4 August; 16:01	Facundo Andreasen (Argentina)	2-0	(Cuba) Alejandro González	Villa María del Triunfo Sports Center; Referees: Pedro López (MEX)
4 August; 16:01	(15-14, 15-8); Report			Villa María del Triunfo Sports Center; Referees: Pedro López (MEX)

4 August; 17:28	Rodrigo Carrasco Pro (Peru)	2-0	(Chile) Martín Letelier	Villa María del Triunfo Sports Center; Referees: Andrés Emilio Caballero (CUB)
4 August; 17:28	(15-5, 15-10); Report			Villa María del Triunfo Sports Center; Referees: Andrés Emilio Caballero (CUB)

5 August; 16:55	Facundo Andreasen (Argentina)	2-0	(Peru) Rodrigo Carrasco Pro	Villa María del Triunfo Sports Center
5 August; 16:55	(15-7, 15-9); Report			Villa María del Triunfo Sports Center

5 August; 18:23	Alejandro González (Cuba)	2-0	(El Salvador) Efrain Segura	Villa María del Triunfo Sports Center; Referees: Pedro López (MEX)
5 August; 18:23	(15-9, 15-4); Report			Villa María del Triunfo Sports Center; Referees: Pedro López (MEX)

6 August; 15:26	Martín Letelier (Chile)	0-2	(Cuba) Alejandro González	Villa María del Triunfo Sports Center; Referees: Jorge Luis Balbi (ARG)
6 August; 15:26	(4-15, 5-15); Report			Villa María del Triunfo Sports Center; Referees: Jorge Luis Balbi (ARG)

6 August; 16:36	Efrain Segura (El Salvador)	0-2	(Argentina) Facundo Andreasen	Villa María del Triunfo Sports Center; Referees: Roberto Andrés Jara (CHI)
6 August; 16:36	(2-15, 1-15); Report			Villa María del Triunfo Sports Center; Referees: Roberto Andrés Jara (CHI)

7 August; 14:31	Facundo Andreasen (Argentina)	2-0	(Chile) Martín Letelier	Villa María del Triunfo Sports Center; Referees: Andrés Emilio Caballero (CUB)
7 August; 14:31	(15-0, 15-1); Report			Villa María del Triunfo Sports Center; Referees: Andrés Emilio Caballero (CUB)

7 August; 15:46	Rodrigo Carrasco Pro (Peru)	2-0	(El Salvador) Efrain Segura	Villa María del Triunfo Sports Center; Referees: Alfonso Franco Romero (CHI)
7 August; 15:46	(15-0, 15-4); Report			Villa María del Triunfo Sports Center; Referees: Alfonso Franco Romero (CHI)

8 August; 16:35	Alejandro González (Cuba)	2-0	(Peru) Rodrigo Carrasco Pro	Villa María del Triunfo Sports Center; Referees: Pedro López (MEX)
8 August; 16:35	(15-13, 15-10); Report			Villa María del Triunfo Sports Center; Referees: Pedro López (MEX)

8 August; 18:10	Martín Letelier (Chile)	0-2	(El Salvador) Efrain Segura	Villa María del Triunfo Sports Center; Referees: Pedro López (MEX)
8 August; 18:10	(6-15, 14-15); Report			Villa María del Triunfo Sports Center; Referees: Pedro López (MEX)

=== Semifinals ===
9 August; 14:01	Arturo Rodriguez (Mexico)	2-0	(Cuba) Alejandro González	Villa María del Triunfo Sports Center; Referees: Dardo Heber Ferreira (URU)
9 August; 14:01	(15-5, 15-4); Report			Villa María del Triunfo Sports Center; Referees: Dardo Heber Ferreira (URU)

9 August; 14:35	Facundo Andreasen (Argentina)	2-0	(Cuba) Braian Ramirez Mesa	Villa María del Triunfo Sports Center; Referees: Roberto Andrés Jara (CHI)
9 August; 14:35	(15-8, 15-0); Report			Villa María del Triunfo Sports Center; Referees: Roberto Andrés Jara (CHI)

=== Bronze medal match ===
10 August; 13:01	Alejandro González (Cuba)	2-0	(Cuba) Braian Ramirez Mesa	Villa María del Triunfo Sports Center; Referees: Pedro López (MEX)
10 August; 13:01	(15-7, 15-7); Report			Villa María del Triunfo Sports Center; Referees: Pedro López (MEX)

=== Gold medal match ===
10 August; 13:49	Arturo Rodriguez (Mexico)	2-1	(Argentina) Facundo Andreasen	Villa María del Triunfo Sports Center; Referees: Andrés Emilio Caballero
10 August; 13:49	(12-15, 15-9, 10-7); Report			Villa María del Triunfo Sports Center; Referees: Andrés Emilio Caballero
