= Longest squash match records =

This article is a list the longest squash match records by duration.

== Overall ==
=== Men ===
- 2 h 50 Holtrand Gas City Pro-Am 2015, semifinal:

(Hong Kong) Leo Au def. (Canada) Shawn Delierre, 11–6, 4–11, 11–6, 7–11, 16–14 (170 min).

- 2 h 46 Chichester Festival 1983, final:

(Pakistan) Jahangir Khan def. (Egypt) Gamal Awad, 9–10, 9–5, 9–7, 9–2 (166 min).

- 2 h 37 National Capital Open 2013, final:

(Canada) Shawn Delierre def. (England) Adrian Waller, 11–13, 12–10, 14–12, 4–11, 14–12 (157 min).

- 2 h 30 Baltimore Cup 2008, semifinal:

(Canada) Shawn Delierre def. (Canada) Shahier Razik, 9–11, 8–11, 11–7, 13–11, 11–5 (150 min).

- 2 h 26 Hong Kong Open 2006, 2nd round:

(France) Grégory Gaultier def. (England) Adrian Grant, 12–10, 11–3, 3–11, 7–11, 13–11 (146 min).

=== Women ===
- 2 h 10 PSA Word Tour Finals 2023, final

(Egypt) Nouran Gohar def. (Egypt) Hania El Hammamy, 10–11, 11–9, 9-11, 11–6, 12–10 (130 min).

- 2 h 07 PSA Word Championships 1981, final

(Australia) Rhonda Thorne def. (Australia) Vicki Cardwell, 8–10, 9–4, 9–5, 7–9, 9–7 (127 min).

== See also ==
- Squash
- PSA World Tour
