= Squash at the 2019 Pan American Games =

- Squash pictogram
- Venue: CAR Voleibol en la Videna
- Dates: July 25–31, 2019
- No. of events: 7 (3 men, 3 women, 1 mixed)
- Competitors: 60 from 13 nations

Squash competitions at the 2019 Pan American Games in Lima, Peru were held from 25 to 31 July 2019 at the CAR Voleibol en la Videna.

7 medal events were contested, a singles, doubles and team event for each gender along with a mixed doubles event. This was the first time the mixed doubles event was contested at the Pan American Games.

== Medalists ==
=== Medal table ===
* Host nation (Peru)

Rank	Nation	Gold	Silver	Bronze	Total
1	United States	5	1	1	7
2	Colombia	1	2	2	5
3	Peru*	1	0	1	2
4	Canada	0	3	4	7
5	Mexico	0	1	4	5
6	Argentina	0	0	1	1
6	Chile	0	0	1	1
Totals (7 entries)		7	7	14	28

=== Men's events ===
Event	Gold	Silver	Bronze
Singles	Diego Elías; Peru	Miguel Ángel Rodríguez; Colombia	César Salazar; Mexico
Singles	Diego Elías; Peru	Miguel Ángel Rodríguez; Colombia	Robertino Pezzota; Argentina
Doubles	United States; Todd Harrity; Chris Hanson	Canada; Shawn Delierre; Nick Sachvie	Mexico; Arturo Salazar; César Salazar
Doubles	United States; Todd Harrity; Chris Hanson	Canada; Shawn Delierre; Nick Sachvie	Peru; Diego Elías; Alonso Escudero
Team	United States; Andrew Douglas; Chris Hanson; Todd Harrity	Colombia; Miguel Ángel Rodríguez; Andrés Herrera; Juan Camilo Vargas	Canada; Shawn Delierre; Nick Sachvie; Andrew Schnell
Team	United States; Andrew Douglas; Chris Hanson; Todd Harrity	Colombia; Miguel Ángel Rodríguez; Andrés Herrera; Juan Camilo Vargas	Mexico; Alfredo Ávila; César Salazar; Arturo Salazar

=== Women's events ===
Event	Gold	Silver	Bronze
Singles	Amanda Sobhy; United States	Olivia Clyne; United States	Samantha Cornett; Canada
Singles	Amanda Sobhy; United States	Olivia Clyne; United States	Hollie Naughton; Canada
Doubles	United States; Amanda Sobhy; Sabrina Sobhy	Canada; Samantha Cornett; Danielle Letourneau	Chile; Giselle Delgado; Ana Pinto
Doubles	United States; Amanda Sobhy; Sabrina Sobhy	Canada; Samantha Cornett; Danielle Letourneau	Colombia; Laura Tovar; María Tovar
Team	United States; Olivia Clyne; Amanda Sobhy; Sabrina Sobhy	Canada; Samantha Cornett; Danielle Letourneau; Hollie Naughton	Mexico; Dina Anguiano; Samantha Terán; Diana García
Team	United States; Olivia Clyne; Amanda Sobhy; Sabrina Sobhy	Canada; Samantha Cornett; Danielle Letourneau; Hollie Naughton	Colombia; Catalina Peláez; Laura Tovar; María Tovar

=== Mixed events ===
Event	Gold	Silver	Bronze
Doubles	Colombia; Miguel Ángel Rodríguez; Catalina Peláez	Mexico; Alfredo Ávila; Diana García	Canada; Andrew Schnell; Hollie Naughton
Doubles	Colombia; Miguel Ángel Rodríguez; Catalina Peláez	Mexico; Alfredo Ávila; Diana García	United States; Andrew Douglas; Olivia Clyne

== Participating nations ==
A total of 13 countries qualified athletes. The number of athletes a nation entered is in parentheses beside the name of the country. Bermuda made its debut in squash at the Pan American Games.

- Argentina (6)
- Bermuda (3)
- Brazil (3)
- Canada (6)
- Chile (6)
- Colombia (6)
- El Salvador (3)
- Guatemala (3)
- Guyana (3)
- Jamaica (3)
- Mexico (6)
- Peru (6)
- United States (6)

== Qualification ==
A total of 60 squash athletes (36 men and 24 women) qualified to compete. Each nation may enter a maximum of 6 athletes (three per gender). The host nation, Peru automatically qualified the maximum team size. The top eleven men's team (of three athletes) and top seven women's teams (of three athletes), excluding Peru, at the 2018 Pan American Championships also qualified.
