= Victor Colonese =

Brazilian swimmer (born 1992)

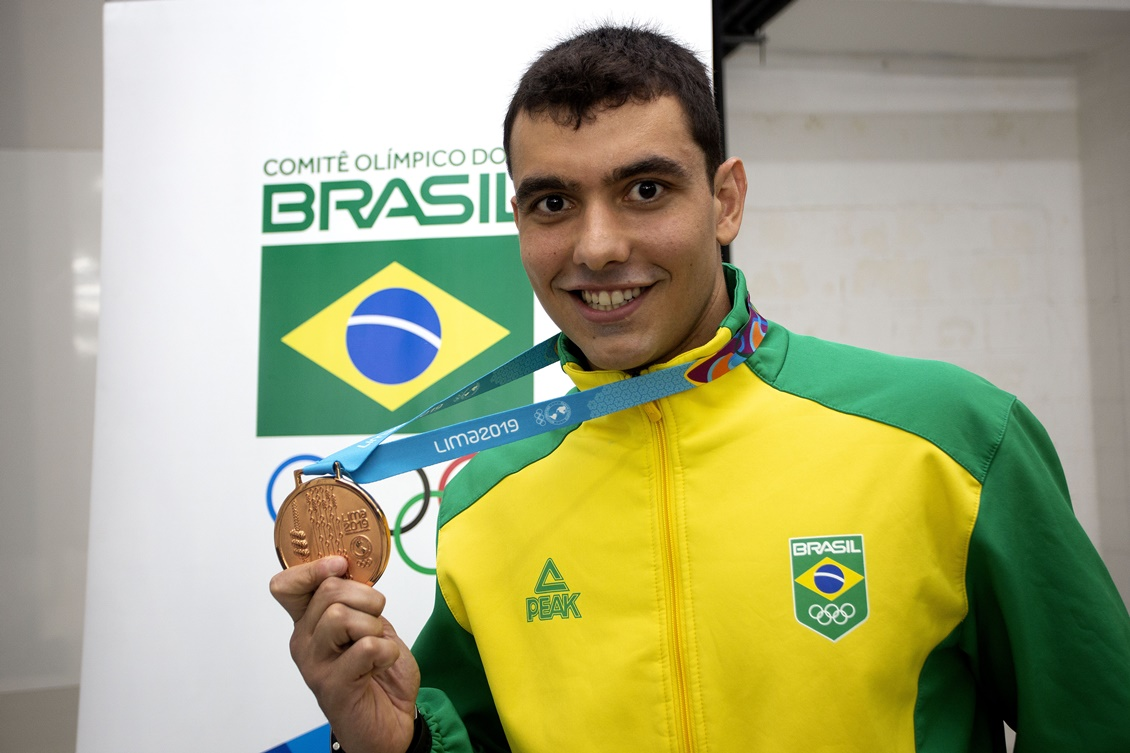

Personal information
- Full name: Victor Hugo Ribeiro Colonese
- Nationality: Brazil
- Born: 16 January 1992 (age 34) Salvador, Bahia, Brazil

Sport
- Sport: Swimming
- Strokes: Freestyle
Medal record
Men's swimming
Representing Brazil
Pan American Games
Bronze medal – third place	2019 Lima	10 km marathon

Victor Hugo Ribeiro Colonese (born January 16, 1992, in Salvador) is a Brazilian swimmer, who specialized in open water marathon.

At the 2011 FINA World Championships in Shanghai, Colonese placed 22nd in the 5 km marathon, with a time of 56:39.7.

At the 2011 Summer Universiade in Shenzhen, he finished 9th in the Men's 10 kilometre marathon.

At the 2015 FINA World Championships in Kazan, he finished 9th in the 5 km marathon.

At the 2017 FINA World Championships in Budapest, he finished 22nd in the 25 km marathon and 39th in the 5 km marathon

At the 2019 Pan American Games held in Lima, Peru, he finished 4th in the Men's marathon 10 kilometres. In July 2020, he inherited the bronze medal, three weeks after the announcement of doping by Argentine Guillermo Bertola, who had been silver in the race.
