= Bowling at the 2019 Pan American Games – Men's doubles =

Men's doubles at the 2019 Pan American Games
- Venue: Bowling Centre
- Dates: July 25–27, 2019
- Competitors: 32 from 16 nations
- Winning score: 5816

Medalists
| Gold medal | Jakob Butturff; Nicholas Pate | United States |
| Silver medal | Manuel Otalora; Alfredo Quintana | Colombia |
| Bronze medal | José Llergo; Arturo Quintero | Mexico |

The men's doubles bowling competitions at the 2019 Pan American Games in Lima, Peru were held between 25 and 27 July 2019.

== Schedule ==
All times are in Peru Time (UTC-5).

| Date | Time | Round | Ref. |
|---|---|---|---|
| 25 July 2019 | 9:00 | First Block (Games 1–6) | |
| 27 July 2019 | 16:00 | Second Block (Games (7–12) | |

== Results ==
| Rank | Nation | Athlete | Total | Grand Total |
|---|---|---|---|---|
| 1st place, gold medalist(s) | United States | Jakob Butturff; Nicholas Pate | 3054; 2491 | 5545 |
| 2nd place, silver medalist(s) | Colombia | Manuel Otalora; Alfredo Quintana | 2763; 2752 | 5515 |
| 3rd place, bronze medalist(s) | Mexico | José Llergo; Arturo Quintero | 2771; 2608 | 5379 |
| 4 | Canada | Francois Lavoie; Dan Maclelland | 2753; 2599 | 5352 |
| 5 | Costa Rica | Jonaykel Conejo; Marco Moretti | 2605; 2744 | 5349 |
| 6 | Venezuela | Luis Rovaina; Ildemaro Ruiz | 2539; 2763 | 5302 |
| 7 | Peru | Adrian Guibu; Yum Ishikawa | 2506; 2761 | 5267 |
| 8 | Bermuda | Damien Matthews; David Maycock | 2570; 2630 | 5200 |
| 9 | Argentina | Jonathan Hocsman; Lucas Legnani | 2408; 2761 | 5169 |
| 10 | Guatemala | Diego Aguilar; Armando Batres | 2535; 2510 | 5045 |
| 11 | Dominican Republic | Alex Prats; Rolando Sebelen | 2581; 2459 | 5040 |
| 12 | Brazil | Bruno Costa; Marcelo Suartz | 2482; 2401 | 4883 |
| 13 | Aruba | Jonathan Bremo; Yannick Roos | 2239; 2413 | 4652 |
| 14 | Panama | Santiago Escobar; Donald Lee | 2730; 2280 | 4650 |
| 15 | El Salvador | Julio Acosta; Luis Bendeck | 2158; 2342 | 4500 |
| DSQ (Note: Jean Pérez Faure has tested positive for doping with chlorthalidone, a prohibited diuretic. The Panam Sports Disciplinary Commission announced this positive the day the Lima Games are closed, on 11 August 2019. As a consequence, the Puerto Rican duo loses gold, which passes to the United States. Colombia gets the silver and the bronze goes to the Mexico team. (Source ).) | Puerto Rico | Cristian Azcona; Jean Pérez Faure | ~~2927~~; ~~2889~~ | ~~5816~~ |
