= Bodybuilding at the 2019 Pan American Games =

- Bodybuilding pictogram
- Venue: Coliseo Mariscal Caceres
- Dates: August 10, 2019
- Competitors: 32 from 19 nations

Bodybuilding competitions at the 2019 Pan American Games in Lima, Peru were held on August 10, 2019 at the Coliseo Mariscal Caceres. The venue also hosted the weightlifting competitions.

In November 2016, Panam Sports added the sport to the Pan American Games sport program, which meant the sport made its debut at the games. A total of two events will be contested: one for men (classic bodybuilding) and one for women (bikini fitness). A total of 32 bodybuilders (16 per gender) competed.

El Salvador won both gold medals on offer.

== Medal table ==
Rank	Nation	Gold	Silver	Bronze	Total
1	El Salvador	2	0	0	2
2	Colombia	0	1	0	1
2	Mexico	0	1	0	1
4	Chile	0	0	1	1
4	Guatemala	0	0	1	1
Totals (5 entries)		2	2	2	6

== Medalists ==
Event	Gold		Silver		Bronze	
Men's class bodybuilding	William Rodríguez; El Salvador	36	Carlos Giraldo; Colombia	38	Jonathan Martínez; Guatemala	40
Women's bikini fitness	Paulina Zamora; El Salvador	21	Xyomara Valdivia; Mexico	36	Macarena Figueroa; Chile	41

== Participating nations ==
A total of 19 countries qualified athletes.

- Argentina (1)
- Belize (1)
- Bolivia (2)
- Brazil (2)
- Chile (2)
- Colombia (2)
- Costa Rica (1)
- Dominican Republic (1)
- Ecuador (2)
- El Salvador (2)
- Guatemala (2)
- Honduras (2)
- Jamaica (1)
- Mexico (2)
- Nicaragua (2)
- Paraguay (1)
- Peru (2)
- Uruguay (2)
- Venezuela (2)

== Qualification ==
A total of 32 athletes qualified. The top 15 athletes (one per nation) after reallocation and the host nation Peru, qualified in each event. Qualification was done at the 2018 Pan American Championships held in Antigua, Guatemala in November.
