= Swimming at the 2019 Pan American Games – Men's marathon 10 kilometres =

Men's marathon 10 kilometre at the 2019 Pan American Games
- Venue: Laguna Bujama
- Dates: August 4
- Competitors: 20 from 12 nations
- Winning time: 1:53:46.7

Medalists
Gold medal	Esteban Enderica	Ecuador
Silver medal	Taylor Abbott	United States
Bronze medal	Victor Colonese	Brazil

The men's marathon 10 kilometre competition of the swimming events at the 2019 Pan American Games were held on August 4, 2019, at Laguna Bujama.

In July 2020, Taylor Abbott inherited the silver medal and Victor Colonese inherited the bronze medal, three weeks after the announcement of doping by Argentine Guillermo Bertola, who had been silver in the race.

== Schedule ==
Date	Time	Round
August 4, 2019	14:30	Final

== Results ==
Rank	Name	Nationality	Time	Notes
1st place, gold medalist(s)	Esteban Enderica	Ecuador	1:53:46.7	
2nd place, silver medalist(s)	Taylor Abbott	United States	1:54:02.7	
3rd place, bronze medalist(s)	Victor Colonese	Brazil	1:54:03.6	
4	David Farinango	Ecuador	1:54:05.8	
5	Franco Cassini	Argentina	1:54:06.2	
6	Jon McKay	Canada	1:54:19.5	
7	Diego Vera	Venezuela	1:54:36.0	
8	Arturo Pérez Vertti	Mexico	1:55:31.7	
9	Raben Dommann	Canada	1:55:33.1	
10	Theodore Smith	United States	1:57:27.6	
11	Fernando Betanzos	Mexico	2:01:50.4	
12	Allan do Carmo	Brazil	2:03:33.5	
13	Diego Serida	Peru	2:04:09.1	
14	Cristian Vidal	Cuba	2:07:31.4	
15	David Marroquín	Guatemala	2:09:48.3	
16	José Reyes Saravia	Guatemala	2:09:49.0	
17	Nector Segovia	El Salvador	2:13:21.0	
18	Cristofer Lanuza	Costa Rica	2:19:26.5	
	Rodolfo Falcón Jr	Cuba	DNF	
	Guillermo Bertola	Argentina	~~1:54:00.0~~	DSQ
