= Swimming at the 2019 Pan American Games – Women's marathon 10 kilometres =

Women's marathon 10 kilometre at the 2019 Pan American Games
- Venue: Laguna Bujama
- Dates: August 4
- Competitors: 20 from 13 nations
- Winning time: 2:00:51.9

Medalists
Gold medal	Ana Marcela Cunha	Brazil
Silver medal	Cecilia Biagioli	Argentina
Bronze medal	Viviane Jungblut	Brazil

The women's marathon 10 kilometre competition of the swimming events at the 2019 Pan American Games was held August 4, 2019 at Laguna Bujama.

== Schedule ==
Date	Time	Round
August 4, 2019	9:00	Final

== Results ==
Rank	Name	Nationality	Time	Notes
1st place, gold medalist(s)	Ana Marcela Cunha	Brazil	2:00:51.9	
2nd place, silver medalist(s)	Cecilia Biagioli	Argentina	2:01:23.2	
3rd place, bronze medalist(s)	Viviane Jungblut	Brazil	2:01:24.0	
4	Romina Imwinkelried	Argentina	2:01:44.7	
5	Kathryn Campbell	United States	2:01:57.5	
6	Kate Sanderson	Canada	2:02:52.2	
7	María Bramont-Arias	Peru	2:02:56.9	
8	Martha Sandoval	Mexico	2:03:44.4	
9	Chantel Jeffrey	Canada	2:04:45.0	
10	Rebecca Mann	United States	2:04:47.0	
11	Paola Pérez	Venezuela	2:05:27.3	
12	Martha Aguilar	Mexico	2:07:46.7	
13	Mahina Valdivia	Chile	2:08:05.5	
14	Jada Chatoor	Trinidad and Tobago	2:14:50.6	
15	Yanci Vanegas	Guatemala	2:17:59.4	
16	Fatima Flores	El Salvador	2:18:05.9	
17	Fatima Portillo	El Salvador	2:25:22.2	
	Mayte González	Cuba	DNF	
	Isabela Cabrera	Guatemala	DNF	
	Samantha Arévalo	Ecuador	DNF	
