= Guatemala at the 2019 Pan American Games =

- IOC code: GUA
- NOC: Guatemalan Olympic Committee

in Lima, Peru 26 July–11 August 2019
- Competitors: 147 in 29 sports
- Flag bearer: Jorge Vega (opening)
- Medals Ranked 16th: Gold 2 Silver 9 Bronze 8 Total 19

Pan American Games appearances (overview)
- 1951; 1955; 1959; 1963; 1967; 1971; 1975; 1979; 1983; 1987; 1991; 1995; 1999; 2003; 2007; 2011; 2015; 2019; 2023

Other related appearances
- Independent Athletes Team (2023)

Guatemala competed in the 2019 Pan American Games in Lima, Peru from July 26 to August 11, 2019.

The Guatemalan team consisted of 147 athletes (74 men and 73 women) that competed in 29 sports.

On July 3, 2019, gymnast Jorge Vega was named as the country's flag bearer during the opening ceremony.

== Medalists ==
The following Guatemalan competitors won medals at the games.

Medal	Name	Sport	Event	Date
Gold	Charles Fernández	Modern pentathlon	Men's individual	July 28
Silver	Edgar Pineda	Weightlifting	Men's 67 kg	July 27
Silver	Gabriela Martinez; Maria Rodriguez	Racquetball	Women's Doubles	August 7
Bronze	María Diéguez; Charles Fernández	Modern pentathlon	Mixed relay	July 30

Medals by sport
Sport	1st place, gold medalist(s)	2nd place, silver medalist(s)	3rd place, bronze medalist(s)	Total
Modern pentathlon	1	0	1	2
Racquetball	0	1	0	1
Weightlifting	0	1	0	1
Total	1	2	1	4

Medals by day
Day	Date	1st place, gold medalist(s)	2nd place, silver medalist(s)	3rd place, bronze medalist(s)	Total
1	July 27	0	1	0	1
2	July 28	1	0	0	1
4	July 30	0	0	1	1
12	August 7	0	1	0	1
Total		1	2	1	4

Medals by gender
Gender	1st place, gold medalist(s)	2nd place, silver medalist(s)	3rd place, bronze medalist(s)	Total
Female	0	1	0	1
Male	1	1	0	2
Mixed	0	0	1	1
Total	1	2	1	4

== Competitors ==
The following is the list of number of competitors (per gender) participating at the games per sport/discipline.

Sport	Men	Women	Total
Archery	4	2	6
Artistic swimming	—N/a	9	9
Athletics (track and field)	7	3	10
Badminton	4	3	7
Basque pelota	1	0	1
Bodybuilding	1	1	2
Boxing	0	1	1
Bowling	2	2	4
Canoeing	1	1	2
Cycling	5	3	8
Equestrian	5	4	9
Golf	2	2	4
Gymnastics	1	1	2
Judo	1	1	2
Karate	1	1	2
Modern pentathlon	2	3	5
Racquetball	2	2	4
Roller sports	1	2	3
Rowing	0	2	2
Sailing	4	3	7
Shooting	9	7	16
Squash	3	0	3
Swimming	4	4	8
Table tennis	2	3	5
Taekwondo	3	3	6
Tennis	2	2	4
Triathlon	1	2	3
Volleyball	2	2	4
Weightlifting	3	3	6
Wrestling	1	0	1
Total	74	72	146

== Archery ==
Men

Athlete	Event	Ranking round		Round of 32	Round of 16	Quarterfinal	Semifinal	Final / BM	
Athlete	Event	Score	Rank	Opposition Result	Opposition Result	Opposition Result	Opposition Result	Opposition Result	Rank
Thomas Flossbach	Individual recurve	649	21	Pila (COL); L 1–7	did not advance				
Diego Castro Rojas	Individual recurve	648	22	Oliveira (BRA); L 2–6	did not advance				
José López Palacios	Individual recurve	605	31	D'Almeida (BRA); L 0–6	did not advance				
José Del Cid Carrillo	Individual compound	689	8	—N/a	Oleas (ECU); W 142–139	Gellenthien (USA); L 146–149	did not advance		
Diego Castro Rojas; Thomas Flossbach; José López Palacios	Team recurve	1902	8	—N/a		United States; L 0–6	did not advance		

Women

Athlete	Event	Ranking round		Round of 32	Round of 16	Quarterfinal	Semifinal	Final / BM	
Athlete	Event	Score	Rank	Opposition Result	Opposition Result	Opposition Result	Opposition Result	Opposition Result	Rank
Cinthya Pellecer	Individual recurve	595	23	Bassi (CHI); W 6–5	Sepúlveda (COL); W 6–2	Kaufhold (USA); L 0–6	did not advance		
Maria Jose Zebadúa	Individual compound	672	10	—N/a	González (ARG); L 137–142	did not advance			

Mixed

Athlete	Event	Ranking round		Round of 16	Quarterfinal	Semifinal	Final / BM	
Athlete	Event	Score	Rank	Opposition Result	Opposition Result	Opposition Result	Opposition Result	Rank
Thomas Flossbach; Cinthya Pellecer	Team recurve	1244	11	Puentes / Rodríguez (CUB); L 1–5	did not advance			
José Del Cid Carrillo; Maria José Zebadúa	Team compound	1361	7	—N/a	Gellenthien / Pearce (USA); W 156–155	Brassaroto / Meleti (BRA); W 150–150	Nikolajuk / González (ARG); L 152–153	2nd place, silver medalist(s)

== Artistic swimming ==
Guatemala qualified a full team of nine artistic swimmers.

Women

Athlete	Event	Technical Routine		Free Routine (Final)			
Athlete	Event	Points	Rank	Points	Rank	Total Points	Rank
Adaya Gamez; Ninoshka Gamez	Duet	64.4536	10	65.0000	11	129.4536	10
Sofia Barillas; Adaya Gamez; Ninoshka Gamez; Yarin Gamez; Rebecka Gonzalez; Fatima Leal; Jennifer Paniagua; Rebeca Urias; Keren Rivera*	Team	62.5421	8	62.2667	8	124.8088	8

- Keren Rivera was the reserve swimmer.

== Athletics (track and field) ==
Guatemala qualified ten track and field athletes (seven men and three women).

Key

- PB = Personal best
- SB = Seasonal best
- DNF = Did not finish
- DSQ = Disqualified

Men
Track and road events

Athlete	Event	Final	
Athlete	Event	Result	Rank
Mario Pacay	5000 m	14:00.99	9
Mario Pacay	10,000 m	29:30.83	10
Williams Julajuj	Marathon	2:17:21 PB	10
Juan Carlos Trujillo	Marathon	2:28:18	16
José Alejandro Barrondo	20 km walk	1:21:57	3rd place, bronze medalist(s)
José María Raymundo	20 km walk	DNF	
Bernardo Barrondo	50 km walk	DSQ	
Erick Barrondo	50 km walk	DNF	

Women
Road events

Athlete	Event	Final	
Athlete	Event	Result	Rank
Maritza Poncio	20 km walk	1:36:49	9
Mayra Herrera	50 km walk	4:30:52 SB	6
Mirna Ortiz	50 km walk	4:15:21	2nd place, silver medalist(s)

== Badminton ==
Guatemala qualified a team of seven badminton athletes (four men and three women). Guatemala was later reallocated an additional male quota, from the original three it had originally qualified.

Singles

Athlete	Event	Round of 64	Round of 32	Round of 16	Quarterfinals	Semifinals	Final	Rank
Athlete	Event	Opposition Result	Opposition Result	Opposition Result	Opposition Result	Opposition Result	Opposition Result	Rank
Rubén Castellanos	Men's singles	Bye	Henry (JAM); W 2–0 (21–12, 21–5)	Lam (USA); L 0–2 (9–21, 17–21)	did not advance			
Kevin Cordón	Men's singles	Bye	González (DOM); W 2–0 (21–8, 21–18)	Ricketts (JAM); W 2–0 (21–15, 21–13)	Navarro (MEX); W 2–0 (21–16, 21–13)	Yang (CAN); L 1–2 (21–15, 13–21, 3^{r}–13)	Did not advance	3rd place, bronze medalist(s)
Diana Corleto	Women's singles	Bye	Gaitan (MEX); L 0–2 (10–21, 18–21)	did not advance				
Alejandra Paiz	Women's singles	Bye	Jiménez (DOM); L 0–2 (13–21, 16–21)	did not advance				
Nikte Sotomayor	Women's singles	Bye	Giraldo (COL); W 2–0 (21–8, 21–16)	Zambrano (ECU); W 2–1 (21–7, 19–21, 21–9)	Silva (BRA); W 2–1 (13–21, 21–19, 21–13)	Honderich (CAN); L 0–2 (8–21, 10–21)	Did not advance	3rd place, bronze medalist(s)

Doubles

Athlete	Event	Round of 32	Round of 16	Quarterfinals	Semifinals	Final	Rank
Athlete	Event	Opposition Result	Opposition Result	Opposition Result	Opposition Result	Opposition Result	Rank
Jonathan Solís; Rodolfo Ramírez	Men's doubles	—N/a	Darmohoetomo / Opti (SUR); W 2–0 (21–7, 21–9)	Farias / Farias (BRA); L 1–2 (19–21, 21–19, 16–21)	did not advance		
Diana Corleto; Nikte Sotomayor	Women's doubles	—N/a	Santos / Silva (PER); L 1–2 (21–14, 20–22, 16–21)	did not advance			
Jonathan Solís; Diana Corleto	Mixed doubles	Artiga / Fuentes (ESA); W 2–0 (21–15, 21–11)	Guerrero / Oropeza (CUB); L 0–2 (13–21, 10–21)	did not advance			

== Basque pelota ==
Guatemala qualified one athlete in basque pelota.

Men

Athlete	Event	Group Stage					Semifinals	Final / BM	
Athlete	Event	Opposition Result	Opposition Result	Opposition Result	Opposition Result	Rank	Opposition Result	Opposition Result	Rank
Juan Blas Fernandez	Individual fronton rubber ball	Vera (VEN); W 2–0	Rodriguez (MEX); L 0–2	Mesa (URU); L 0–2	Tejeda (USA); W 2–0	3	did not advance		

== Bodybuilding ==
Guatemala qualified a full team of two bodybuilders (one male and one female).

Athlete	Event	Prejudging		Final	
Athlete	Event	Points	Rank	Points	Rank
Jonathan Martinez Catalan	Men's classic bodybuilding	—N/a		40	3rd place, bronze medalist(s)
Paula Recinos Orellana	Women's bikini fitness	—N/a		did not advance	

- No results were provided for the prejudging round, with only the top six advancing.

== Boxing ==
Guatemala qualified one woman boxer.

Women

Athlete	Event	Quarterfinals	Semifinals	Final	Rank
Athlete	Event	Opposition Result	Opposition Result	Opposition Result	Rank
Zulena Alvarez	75 kg	Thibeault (CAN); L RSC	did not advance		

== Bowling ==
Athlete	Event	Qualification / Final														Round robin											Semifinal	Final	
Athlete	Event	Block 1						Block 2						Total	Rank	Round robin											Semifinal	Final	
Athlete	Event	1	2	3	4	5	6	7	8	9	10	11	12	Total	Rank	1	2	3	4	5	6	7	8	Total	Grand total	Rank	Opposition Result	Opposition Result	Rank
Armando Batres	Men's singles	203	235	224	253	249	195	159	216	232	192	164	167	2489	21	did not advance													
Diego Aguilar	Men's singles	255	198	212	202	202	221	215	158	156	212	201	210	2442	25	did not advance													
Armando Batres; Diego Aguilar	Men's doubles	383	466	460	416	415	413	403	381	421	431	408	448	5045	10º	—N/a													
Sofía Granda	Women's singles	167	212	201	211	206	197	255	192	226	245	195	235	2542	7 Q	150	172	151	225	203	202	178	165	1486	4028	8	did not advance		
Ana Bolaños	Women's singles	200	146	175	183	177	160	164	178	173	164	196	183	2099	31	did not advance													
Sofía Granda; Ana Bolaños	Women's doubles	398	371	408	406	435	335	393	366	439	397	395	384	4727	9	—N/a													

== Canoeing ==
=== Sprint ===
Guatemala qualified two athletes in canoe sprint (one per gender).

Athlete	Event	Heats		Semifinal		Final	
Athlete	Event	Time	Rank	Time	Rank	Time	Rank
Jeffrey Gonzalez	Men's K-1 200 metres	42.030	7 SF	42.968	8	did not advance	
Jeffrey Gonzalez	Men's K-1 1000 metres	4.24.327	7 SF	4:28.320	8	did not advance	
Clara Montesdeoca	Women's C-1 200 metres	53.156	5 SF	50.725	4 F	52.559	8

Position is within the heat, SF – Qualified for the semifinals, F – Qualified for the final

== Cycling ==
Guatemala qualified eight cyclists (five men and three women).

=== BMX ===
Guatemala entered two athletes (one per gender) in the BMX racing event.

Athlete	Event	Time trial		Quarterfinal		Semifinal		Final	
Athlete	Event	Result	Rank	Points	Rank	Time	Rank	Time	Rank
Sergio Marroquin	Men's BMX	37.439	21	16	5	did not advance			
Andrea Gonzalez	Women's BMX	46.200	13	—N/a		20	7	did not advance	

=== Mountain biking ===
Guatemala entered one male in the cross-country event.

Men

Athlete	Event	Time	Rank
Jhonathan de Leon	Cross-country	1:32:48	9

=== Road ===
Four cyclists (three men and one woman) competed in the road events.

Athlete	Event	Final	
Athlete	Event	Time	Rank
Jhonathan de Leon	Men's road race	4:09:20	29
Dorian Monterroso	Men's road race	4:09:03	17
Manuel Rodas	Men's road race	4:06:47	8
Manuel Rodas	Men's time trial	47:42.39	9
Jasmin Soto	Women's road race	2:19:53	14

=== Track ===
Sprint

Athlete	Event	Qualification		Round of 16	Repechage 1	Quarterfinals	Semifinals	Final	
Athlete	Event	Time	Rank	Opposition Time	Opposition Time	Opposition Result	Opposition Result	Opposition Result	Rank
Brandon Estrada	Men's individual	10.261	8 Q	En Fa (SUR); L 10.994	Morales (COL), Archambault (CAN); L 10.635	Did not advance			
Joanne Hacohen	Women's individual	11.659	7 Q	Walsh (CAN); L 11.910	Vera (ARG), Sevilla (ECU); W 12.037	Mitchell (CAN); L 11.486, L 11.795	—N/a	Disputa pelo 5º-8º lugar Guerra (CUB), Walsh (CAN), Gaviria (COL); L 12.115	6

Keirin

Athlete	Event	Heats	Repechage	Final
Athlete	Event	Rank	Rank	Rank
Brandon Estrada	Men's	5 R	1 FA	4
Joanne Hacohen	Women's	2 FA	—N/a	4

Omnium

Athlete	Event	Scratch race		Tempo race		Elimination race		Points race		Total	
Athlete	Event	Rank	Points	Points	Rank	Rank	Points	Points	Rank	Points	Rank
Dorian Monterroso	Men's	10	22	20	11	12	18	9	8	69	11
Jasmin López	Women's	13	16	20	11	15	12	2	9	50	13

== Equestrian ==
Guatemala qualified a full team of 12 equestrians (four per discipline). However, only 9 combinations competed.

=== Dressage ===
Athlete	Horse	Event	Qualification						Grand Prix Freestyle / Intermediate I Freestyle	
Athlete	Horse	Event	Grand Prix / Prix St. Georges		Grand Prix Special / Intermediate I		Total		Grand Prix Freestyle / Intermediate I Freestyle	
Athlete	Horse	Event	Score	Rank	Score	Rank	Score	Rank	Score	Rank
Isabel Arzú	Macchiato	Individual	63.765	30	63.235	27	127.000	29	did not advance	
Alexandra Dominguez	Etanga	Individual	68.647	11	66.118	18	134.765	13 Q	64.930	18

=== Eventing ===
Athlete	Horse	Event	Dressage		Cross-country		Jumping		Total	
Athlete	Horse	Event	Points	Rank	Points	Rank	Points	Rank	Points	Rank
Stefanie Brand	Ginfer Palo Blanco	Individual	41.40	29	Eliminated		did not advance			
Sarka Kolackova	Carneval	Individual	35.70	17	Retired		did not advance			
Wylder Rodriguez	Espacito-S	Individual	40.60	25	24.00	13	4.00	11	68.60	14
Carlos Sueiras	Valentina RN	Individual	43.50	35	Eliminated		did not advance			
Stefanie Brand; Sarka Kolackova; Wylder Rodriguez; Carlos Sueiras	As above	Team	117.70	7	2024.00	8	4.00	3	2068.60	8

=== Jumping ===
Athlete	Horse	Event	Qualification								Final					
Athlete	Horse	Event	Round 1		Round 2		Round 3		Total		Round A		Round B		Total	
Athlete	Horse	Event	Faults	Rank	Faults	Rank	Faults	Rank	Faults	Rank	Faults	Rank	Faults	Rank	Faults	Rank
Juan Pivaral	Zippo CG	Individual	19.13	44	Eliminated		did not advance									
Juan Rodriguez	Magnolia Mystic Rose	Individual	7.90	27	4	9	9	23	20.90	18 Q	12	19 Q	1	5	13	16
Wylder Rodriguez	d'Artagnan	Individual	18.20	43	Eliminated		did not advance									
Juan Saenz	Ferdinand	Individual	14.33	36	24	42	21	37	59.33	39 Q	Retired					
Juan Pivaral; Juan Rodriguez; Wylder Rodriguez; Juan Saenz	As above	Team	40.43	11	Eliminated		did not advance				—N/a					

== Golf ==
Guatemala qualified a full team of four golfers (two men and two women).

Athlete(s)	Event	Final						
Athlete(s)	Event	Round 1	Round 2	Round 3	Round 4	Total	To par	Rank
Daniel Gurtner	Men's individual	68	70	73	69	280	-4	18
José Toledo	Men's individual	69	68	68	64	269	-15	2nd place, silver medalist(s)
Pilar Echeverria	Women's individual	71	78	70	73	292	+8	13
Valeria Mendizabal	Women's individual	75	78	71	71	295	+11	16
Daniel Gurtner; José Toledo; Pilar Echeverria; Valeria Mendizabal	Mixed team	139	146	138	135	558	-10	5

== Gymnastics ==
=== Artistic ===
Guatemala qualified one male and one female artistic gymnast.

Men

Women

== Judo ==
Guatemala qualified two judoka (one male and one female).

Athlete	Event	Preliminaries	Quarterfinals	Semifinals	Repechage	Final / BM	
Athlete	Event	Opposition Result	Opposition Result	Opposition Result	Opposition Result	Opposition Result	Rank
Julio Molina	Men's 60 kg	Vergara (PAN); L 00–01S2	did not advance				
Jacqueline Solís	Women's 48 kg	Farias (BRA); L 00–11	did not advance				

== Karate ==
Guatemala qualified two karateka (one per gender).

Kumite

Atleta	Evento	Fase de grupos				Semifinal	Final	
Atleta	Evento	Adversário Resultado	Adversário Resultado	Adversário Resultado	Posição	Adversário Resultado	Adversário Resultado	Posição
Allan Maldonado	Men's -75 kg	Ortuno (VEN); D 0–0	Charpentier (CHI); W 3–0	Soriano (DOM); W 3–0	1 Q	Verissimo (BRA); L 2–4	Did not advance	3rd place, bronze medalist(s)
Cheili Gonzalez	Women's –50 kg	Servin (PAR); W 4–0	Villanueva (DOM); W 1–0	Hernández (MEX); L 0–2	2 Q	Nishi (USA); L 2–3	Did not advance	3rd place, bronze medalist(s)

== Modern Pentathlon ==
Guatemala qualified five modern pentathletes (two men and three women).

Athlete	Event	Fencing (Épée one touch)			Swimming (200 m freestyle)			Riding (Show jumping)			Shooting / Running (10 m laser pistol / 3000 m cross-country)			Total	
Athlete	Event	V – D	Rank	MP points	Time	Rank	MP points	Penalties	Rank	MP points	Time	Rank	MP points	MP points	Rank
Charles David Wanke	Men's individual	21-10	3	243	2:02.40	2	306	9	4	291	10:48.00	1	652	1492	1st place, gold medalist(s)
Jorge David Cabrera	Men's individual	20-11	5	242	2:09.43	12	292	EL		0	11:19.00	9	621	1155	20
Charles David Wanke; Jorge David Cabrera	Men's relay	18-8	2	252	1:55.48	3	320	117.01	10	227	11:27.00	8	613	1412	5
Ana Sophia Cuellar	Women's individual	19-12	10	231	2:25.31	11	260	14	8	286	13:06.00	514	10	1291	5
Maria Ximena Godoy	Women's individual	23-8	4	257	2:24.40	8	262	EL		0	13:33.00	487	15	1006	17
Sofia Escobar	Women's individual	20-11	7	236	2:25.20	10	260	EL		0	13:16.00	504	13	1000	20
Ana Sophia Cuellar; Sofia Escobar	Women's relay	26-14	3	242	2:13.44	4	284	190.54	5	155	12:30.00	4	550	1231	4
Charles David Wanke; Maria Ximena Godoy	Mixed relay	31-17	4	238	2:01.52	2	307	118.78	8	271	11:14.00	2	626	1442	3rd place, bronze medalist(s)

== Racquetball ==
Guatemala qualified four racquetball athletes (two men and two women).

Men

Athlete	Event	Qualifying Round robin				Round of 16	Quarterfinals	Semifinals	Final	Rank
Athlete	Event	Match 1	Match 2	Match 3	Rank	Opposition Result	Opposition Result	Opposition Result	Opposition Result	Rank
Edwin Galicia	Singles	Luque (PER); W 2–0	Franco (COL); L 0–2	Bredenbeck (USA); L 0–2	3	did not advance				
Juan Salvatierra	Singles	Mercado (COL); L 0–2	Keller (BOL); L 0–2	—N/a	3	did not advance				
Edwin Galicia; Juan Salvatierra	Doubles	Kurzbard / Manzuri (ARG); L 0–2	Iwaasa / Murray (CAN); L 1–2	Carson / Pratt (USA); L 0–2	4 Q	Rios / Ugalde (CUB); W 2–0	Acuna / Camacho (CRC); L 0–2	did not advance		
Edwin Galicia; Juan Salvatierra	Team	—N/a				Dominican Republic; W 2–1	Bolivia; L 0–2	did not advance		

Women

Athlete	Event	Qualifying Round robin				Round of 16	Quarterfinals	Semifinals	Final	Rank
Athlete	Event	Match 1	Match 2	Match 3	Rank	Opposition Result	Opposition Result	Opposition Result	Opposition Result	Rank
Gabriela Martinez	Singles	Vargas (ARG); L 1–2	Jimenez (DOM); W 2–0	—N/a	2 Q	Mendez (ARG); L 1–2	did not advance			
Maria Rodriguez	Singles	Delgado (DOM); L 1–2	Longoria (MEX); L 0–2	—N/a	3	did not advance				
Gabriela Martinez; Maria Rodriguez	Doubles	Jimenez / Delgado (DOM); W 2–0	Barrios / Daza (BOL); W 2–1	Lambert / Saunders (CAN); W 2–1	1 Q	Bye	Amaya / Riveros (COL); W 2–1	Vargas / Mendez (ARG); W 2–1	Longoria / Salas (MEX); L 1–2	2nd place, silver medalist(s)
Gabriela Martinez; Maria Rodriguez	Team	—N/a				Bye	Bolivia; L 0–2	did not advance		

== Roller sports ==
=== Speed ===
Athlete	Event	Preliminary		Semifinal		Final	
Athlete	Event	Time	Rank	Time	Rank	Time	Rank
Walter Urrutia	Men's 300 m time trial	—N/a				25.582	5
Walter Urrutia	Men's 500 m	44.744	3	Did not advance			
Dalia Marenco	Women's 300 m time trial	—N/a				26.800	3rd place, bronze medalist(s)
Dalia Marenco	Women's 500 m	47.004	2 Q	46.636	2 Q	47.370	2nd place, silver medalist(s)
Angélica García	Women's 10,000 m elimination	—N/a				Eliminated	

== Rowing ==
Women

Athlete	Event	Heat		Repechage		Semifinal		Final A/B	
Athlete	Event	Time	Rank	Time	Rank	Time	Rank	Time	Rank
Jennieffer Zuñiga; Yulisa López	Lightweight double sculls	7:41.11	4 R	7:25.24	6 FB	—N/a		Not held	8

== Sailing ==
Guatemala qualified seven sailors and five boats. The team consisted of four men and three women.

Key

- STP= Standard penalty
- UFD= U flag disqualification

Athlete	Event	Race													Net Points	Final Rank
Athlete	Event	1	2	3	4	5	6	7	8	9	10	11	12	M	Net Points	Final Rank
Juan Ignacio Maegli	Men's laser	1	3	1	3	8	2	7	3	1	3	—N/a		4	28	1st place, gold medalist(s)
Isabella Maegli	Women's laser radial	4	9	3	7	8	4	10	5	6	7	—N/a		10	63	6
David Hernandez	Open sunfish	11	9	9	9	2	3	4	5	STP	6	—N/a		14	64	6
Daniel Hernandez; Josselyn Echeverria	Mixed snipe	3	8	9	10	10	10	10	10	10	10	—N/a		Did not qualify	80	10
Jason Hess; Katya Castellanos	Mixed nacra 17	2	5	6	4	8	9	8	8	UFD	7	5	6	Did not qualify	68	7

== Shooting ==
Guatemala qualified 21 sport shooters (11 men and ten women). The nation entered only 16 sport shooters (9 men and 7 women).

Men

Athlete	Event	Qualification		Final	
Athlete	Event	Points	Rank	Points	Rank
Albino Jiménez	10 m air pistol	569	6 Q	134.8	7
Albino Jiménez	25 m rapid fire pistol	548	14	Did not advance	
José Castillo	10 m air pistol	564	17	Did not advance	
José Castillo	25 m rapid fire pistol	550	13	Did not advance	
Douglas Arias	10 m air rifle	611.7	17	Did not advance	
Allan Chinchilla	10 m air rifle	611.2	20	Did not advance	
Allan Chinchilla	50 m rifle three position	1132	19	Did not advance	
Octavio Sandoval	50 m rifle three position	1133	18	Did not advance	
Jean Brol	Trap	115	11	Did not advance	
Hebert Brol	Trap	107	21	Did not advance	
Juan Schaeffer	Skeet	123	1 Q	48	2nd place, silver medalist(s)
Santiago Romero	Skeet	115	16	Did not advance	

Women

Athlete	Event	Qualification		Final	
Athlete	Event	Points	Rank	Points	Rank
Kimberly Linares	10 m air pistol	557	11	Did not advance	
Kimberly Linares	25 m pistol	561	14	Did not advance	
Delmi Cruz	10 m air pistol	557	12	Did not advance	
Lucia Menendez	25 m pistol	562	12	Did not advance	
Jazmine Matta	10 m air rifle	620.7	5 Q	141.4	7
Jazmine Matta	50 m rifle three position	1138	11	Did not advance	
Polymaria Velasquez	10 m air rifle	615.6	11	Did not advance	
Polymaria Velasquez	50 m rifle three position	1119	23	Did not advance	
Ana Soto	Trap	110	3 Q	21	4
Ana Soto	Skeet	56	11	Did not advance	
Stefanie Goetzke	Trap	108	4 Q	18	5

Mixed

Athlete	Event	Qualification		Final	
Athlete	Event	Points	Rank	Points	Rank
José Castillo; Delmi Monzón	10 m air pistol	751	11	Did not advance	
Albino Jiménez; Kimberly Linares	10 m air pistol	746	14	Did not advance	
Douglas Arias; Jazmine Matta	10 m air rifle	819.9	12	Did not advance	
Juan Chinchilla; Polymaria Velasquez	10 m air rifle	815.5	16	Did not advance	
Jean Brol; Adriana Ruano	Trap	138	4 Q	17	5
Hebert Brol; Ana Soto	Trap	133	7	Did not advance	

== Squash ==
Men

Athlete	Event	Group stage			Round of 16	Quarterfinal	Semifinal / Cl.	Final / BM / Pl.	
Athlete	Event	Opposition Result	Opposition Result	Rank	Opposition Result	Opposition Result	Opposition Result	Opposition Result	Rank
Edwin Franco	Singles	—N/a			Diaz (ESA); W 3-1	Elías (PER); L 0-3	did not advance		
Alejandro Franco	Singles	—N/a			Tschick (BRA); W 3-2	Hanson (USA); L 0-3	did not advance		
Edwin Franco; Alejandro Franco	Doubles	—N/a				Binnie / Walters (JAM); L1-2	did not advance		
Edwin Franco; Alejandro Franco; Mauricio Muñoz	Team	Peru; L 1-2	Mexico; L 0-3	3	Jamaica; W 2-1	Colombia; L 0-2	Classification 5th-8th place Argentina; W 2-0	Fifth place match Brazil; W 2-0	5

== Swimming ==
Guatemala qualified four swimmers (two per gender). Guatemala also qualified four open water swimmers (two per gender).

Key

- Note – Ranks given are for the entire round
- GR – Pan American Games record
- NR – National record
- QA – Qualified for Final A
- QB – Qualified for Final B
- DNF – Did not finish

Men

Athlete	Event	Heat		Final	
Athlete	Event	Time	Rank	Time	Rank
Erick Guzmán	200 m backstroke	2:04.36	11 QB	2:04.88	11
Erick Guzmán	200 m individual medley	2:06.06 NR	11 QB	2:05.99 NR	10
Erick Guzmán	400 m individual medley	4:26.64 NR	7 QA	4:25.62	7 QA
Luis Martínez	50 m freestyle	22.85	11 QB	22.99	12
Luis Martínez	100 m butterfly	51.44 GR, NR	1 QA	51.63	2nd place, silver medalist(s)
David Marroquín	10 k open water	—N/a		2:09:48.3	16
José Reyes Saravia	10 k open water	—N/a		2:09:49.0	17

Women

Athlete	Event	Heat		Final	
Athlete	Event	Time	Rank	Time	Rank
María Mejia	50 m freestyle	27.56	23	did not advance	
María Mejia	100 m freestyle	58.57	16 QB	57.94	14
María Mejia	200 m freestyle	2:08.32	17	did not advance	
Krista Schmoock	100 m breaststroke	1:16.20	18	did not advance	
Krista Schmoock	200 m breaststroke	2:41.14	14 QB	2:42.98	15
Krista Schmoock	400 m individual medley	5:17.28	13 QB	5:12.72	12
Isabela Cabrera	10 k open water	—N/a		DNF	
Yanci Vanegas	10 k open water	—N/a		2:17:59.4	15

== Table tennis ==
Guatemala qualified two men and three women table tennis players.

Men

Athlete	Event	Group stage			Round of 32	Round of 16	Quarterfinal	Semifinal	Final / BM	
Athlete	Event	Opposition Result	Opposition Result	Rank	Opposition Result	Opposition Result	Opposition Result	Opposition Result	Opposition Result	Rank
Heber Moscoso	Singles	—N/a			Aguirre (PAR); L 0–4	did not advance				
Héctor Gatica	Singles	—N/a			Hazin (CAN); L 0–4	did not advance				
Héctor Gatica; Heber Moscoso	Doubles	—N/a				Campos / Pereira (CUB); L 0–4	did not advance			

Women

Athlete	Event	Group stage			Round of 32	Round of 16	Quarterfinal	Semifinal	Final / BM	
Athlete	Event	Opposition Result	Opposition Result	Rank	Opposition Result	Opposition Result	Opposition Result	Opposition Result	Opposition Result	Rank
Hidalynn Zapata	Singles	—N/a			Codina (ARG); W 4–3	Vega (CHI); L 3–4	did not advance			
Mabelyn Enríquez	Singles	—N/a			Lovet (CUB); L 3–4	did not advance				
Lucía Cordero; Mabelyn Enríquez	Doubles	—N/a				Côté / Zhang (CAN); L 1–4	did not advance			
Lucía Cordero; Mabelyn Enríquez; Hidalynn Zapata	Team	United States; L 0–3	Argentina; L 1-3	3	—N/a		did not advance			9

Mixed

Athlete	Event	Round of 16	Quarterfinal	Semifinal	Final / BM	
Athlete	Event	Opposition Result	Opposition Result	Opposition Result	Opposition Result	Rank
Héctor Gatica; Mabelyn Enríquez	Doubles	Bye	Madrid / Silva (MEX); L 2–4	did not advance		

== Taekwondo ==
Guatemala qualified six taekwondo athletes (three per gender). Five contested the poomsae events, while one competed in kyorugi.

Kyorugi
Women

Athlete	Event	Round of 16	Quarterfinals	Semifinals	Repechage	Final / BM	Rank
Athlete	Event	Opposition Result	Opposition Result	Opposition Result	Opposition Result	Opposition Result	Rank
Estefanie Pedroza	49 kg	Aguirre (CUB); L 7–11	did not advance				

Poomsae

Athlete (s)	Event	Round 1		Round 2		Average	Rank
Athlete (s)	Event	Result	Rank	Result	Rank	Average	Rank
Dany Coy	Men's individual	7.28	5	7.18	5	7.230	5
Maria Eufragio	Women's individual	6.84	7	6.68	7	6.760	7
Hector Morales; Maria Higueros	Mixed pairs	6.46	5	6.74	5	6.660	5
Eduardo Garrido; Maria Eufragio; Dany Coy; Hector Morales; Maria Higueros	Mixed freestyle teams	6.860	5	—N/a		6.860	5

== Tennis ==
Men

Athlete	Event	Round of 64	Round of 32	Round of 16	Quarterfinal	Semifinal	Final / BM	
Athlete	Event	Opposition Result	Opposition Result	Opposition Result	Opposition Result	Opposition Result	Opposition Result	Rank
Wilfredo González	Singles	Sánchez (MEX); W 6–4, 6–3	Bagnis (ARG); L 3–6, 3–6	did not advance				
Stefan González	Singles	Alvarado (ESA); L 1–6, 4–6	did not advance					
Stefan González; Wilfredo González	Doubles	—N/a	Bye	Menezes / Wild (BRA); L 1–6, 4–6	did not advance			

Women

Athlete	Event	Round of 32	Round of 16	Quarterfinal	Semifinal	Final / BM	
Athlete	Event	Opposition Result	Opposition Result	Opposition Result	Opposition Result	Opposition Result	Rank
Andrea Weedon	Singles	Reasco (ECU); L 4–6, 4–6	did not advance				
Melissa Morales	Singles	Seguel (CHI); L 0–6, 1–6	did not advance				
Melissa Morales; Andrea Weedon	Doubles	—N/a	Pella; Podoroska (ARG); L 1–6, 1–6	did not advance			

Mixed

Athlete	Event	Round of 16	Quarterfinal	Semifinal	Final / BM	
Athlete	Event	Opposition Result	Opposition Result	Opposition Result	Opposition Result	Rank
Wilfredo González; Andrea Weedon	Doubles	Bye	Hernández / Williford (DOM); W 6–2, 7–5	Jarry / Guarachi (CHI); W 1–6, 2–6	Galdós / Iamachkine (PER); L 5–7, 1–6	4

== Triathlon ==
Individual

Athlete	Event	Swimming (1.5 km)	Transition 1	Biking (40 km)	Transition 2	Running (10 km)	Total	Rank
Gerardo Pontaza	Men's	19:18	0:55	1:06:38	0:28	37:33	2:04:50	27
Barbara Daniela Rabanale	Women's	21:45	1:06	1:15:14	0:48	41:38	2:20:29	24
Barbara Marleny Rabanale	Women's	21:40	1:33	1:14:53	0:32	42:05	2:20:41	25

== Volleyball ==
=== Beach ===
Guatemala qualified four beach volleyball athletes (two men and two women).

Athletes	Event	Preliminary Round				Qualifying finals	Placement round	Placement match	Rank
Athletes	Event	Opposition Score	Opposition Score	Opposition Score	Rank	Opposition Score	Opposition Score	Opposition Score	Rank
Andy Leonardo; Luis García	Men's	Hernández / Gómez (VEN); L 0–2 (18–21, 19–21)	Medina / Sánchez (DOM); W 2–9 (21–19, 21–15)	Vásquez / Seminario (PER); W 2–0 (21–11, 21–6)	2 Q	Vieyto / Cairus (URU); L 0–2 (15–21, 17–21)	Escobar / Vargas (ESA); W 2–1 (21–13, 17–21, 15–11)	Satterfield / Burik (USA); W 2–1 (22–24, 37–35, 15–11)	9
Paola Alvarado; Estefanie Bethancourt	Women's	Gallay / Pereyra (ARG); L 0–2 (13–21, 11–21)	Harnett / Lapointe (CAN); L 0–2 (16–21, 9–21)	Mendoza / Rodriguez (NCA); L 0–2 (15–21, 18–21)	4	—N/a	Vargas / Vasquez (ESA); L 0–2 (15–21, 20–22)	Charles / Valenciana (ISV); W 2–0 (21–17, 21–8)	15

== Weightlifting ==
Guatemala qualified six weightlifters (three men and three women).

Athlete	Event	Snatch		Clean & Jerk		Total	Rank
Athlete	Event	Result	Rank	Result	Rank	Total	Rank
Edgar Pineda	Men's 67 kg	132	3	165	2	297	2nd place, silver medalist(s)
Óscar Valdizón	Men's 73 kg	127	6	165	6	292	6
Gilberto Lemus	Men's +109 kg	170	5	205	5	375	5
Margoth Reynoso	Women's 49 kg	75	7	88	7	163	6
Lesbia Cruz	Women's 64 kg	80	10	108	9	188	9
Scarleth Ucelo	Women's +87 kg	76	5	110	5	186	5

== Wrestling ==
Guatemala received one wild card in the Greco-Roman discipline.

Men

Athlete	Event	Qualification	Quarterfinals	Semifinals	Repechage	Final / BM	Rank
Athlete	Event	Opposition Result	Opposition Result	Opposition Result	Opposition Result	Opposition Result	Rank
David Choc	Greco-Roman 77 kg	Batista (DOM); L 0–8	did not advance				

== See also ==
- Guatemala at the 2020 Summer Olympics
