= Brandon Estrada =

Vocalist. American pole vaulter

Brandon Estrada (born October 28, 1987, as Brandon Michael-Paul Estrada) is an American pole vaulter. He graduated from the University of Southern California in 2011.

He is the son of actor Erik Estrada and entertainment executive Peggy Lynn Rowe. After graduating from USC, Estrada went on to study jazz voice at University of Cincinnati (CCM) under Patricia Linehart. In 2019, he released the single "Coming for You".

Estrada was the All-Time United States Indoor Track and Field Pole Vault record holder, He also held the indoor national record for Puerto Rico, and was the silver medalist for Puerto Rico at the 2010 Central American and Caribbean Games. He represented the University of Southern California as a pole vaulter.

In 2010, Estrada was the UCLA USC Dual Meet pole vault champion.

His personal best vault is 18–1.25 / 5.52 meters achieved on April 16, 2011, at the 53rd AnnualMt. SAC Relays in Walnut, California.

Estrada is still involved in Track and Field as an adviser.

== Accomplishments ==
NCAA Indoor National All-Time United States PV

2010 NCAA Indoor Division 1 ranked #1

2010 Indoor and Outdoor #1 leader in California

2010 NCAA Outdoor National Championships 5th place

Two time NCAA Div 1 All American

2010 Caribbean Central American Games Silver Medalist.

USC All Time Pole Vault #4

2010 Clovis North American Championships runner up Elite section.

2010 NCAA West Regionals 1st place.

2010 PAC 10 runner up

UCLA USC Dual Meet Champion; ending UCLA's 7 year win streak against USC.

IAAF 2011 World Ranked IAAF 2010 World Ranked

USC All-Americans (Indoors)

== See also ==
- List of Puerto Ricans
