= Javier Castilla =

Colombian squash player (born 1981)

Personal information
- Full name: Javier Castilla Conde
- Born: April 18, 1981 (age 45) Bogotá, Colombia

Sport
Medal record
Representing Colombia
Men's squash
Pan American Games
Gold medal – first place	2007 Rio de Janeiro	Team
South American Games
Gold medal – first place	2010 Medellín	Doubles
Gold medal – first place	2010 Medellín	Team

Javier Castilla Conde (born April 18, 1981, in Bogotá) is a professional male squash player who represented Colombia. He reached a career-high world ranking of World No. 186 in March 2007 after having joined the Professional Squash Association (PSA) in 2006.
