= Andrew Schnell =

Canadian squash player (born 1991)

Personal information
- Born: November 1, 1991 (age 34) Calgary, Alberta, Canada
- Height: 1.80 m (5 ft 11 in)
- Weight: 64 kg (141 lb)

Sport
- Country: Canada
- Turned pro: 2007
- Coached by: Graeme Schnell
- Retired: Active
- Racquet used: Dunlop

Men's singles, Men's Doubles
- Highest ranking: No. 60 (October, 2016)
- Current ranking: No. 70 (January, 2017)
- Titles: CVSL Sacramento Open, Samson Seattle Open, Lew-Lapointe Mount Royal Open
Medal record
Men's squash
Representing Canada
Pan American Games
Silver medal – second place	2011 Guadalajara	Team
Bronze medal – third place	2019 Lima	Team
- Updated on January 2017

Andrew Schnell (born November 1, 1991) is a professional squash player who represents Canada. He reached a career-high world ranking of World No. 60 in October 2016. He is the elder brother of professional squash player Graeme Schnell, who also represents Canada internationally.
