= El Salvador at the 2019 Pan American Games =

- IOC code: ESA
- NOC: El Salvador Olympic Committee

in Lima, Peru 26 July–11 August 2019
- Competitors: 59 in 22 sports
- Flag bearer: Roberto Hernández (opening)
- Medals Ranked 15th: Gold 3 Silver 0 Bronze 1 Total 4

Pan American Games appearances (overview)
- 1951; 1955; 1959; 1963; 1967; 1971; 1975; 1979; 1983; 1987; 1991; 1995; 1999; 2003; 2007; 2011; 2015; 2019; 2023; 2027

El Salvador competed in the 2019 Pan American Games in Lima, Peru from July 26 to August 11, 2019.

On July 1, 2019, archer Roberto Hernández was named as the country's flag bearer during the opening ceremony. On the same day the El Salvador Olympic Committee announced the full team of 56 athletes (29 men and 27 women) competing in 21 sports. Later three athletes (one man and two women) were added to the team.

== Competitors ==
The following is a gender-wise breakdown of the number of the country's competitors at the games per sport/discipline.

Sport	Men	Women	Total
Archery	2	1	3
Artistic swimming	—N/a	2	2
Athletics (track and field)	2	0	2
Badminton	1	1	2
Basque pelota	1	0	1
Bodybuilding	1	1	2
Bowling	2	2	4
Boxing	0	2	2
Fencing	0	1	1
Gymnastics	1	1	2
Judo	1	0	1
Roller sports	0	2	2
Rowing	0	1	1
Sailing	1	0	1
Shooting	4	5	9
Squash	3	0	3
Surfing	1	2	3
Swimming	2	4	6
Tennis	3	0	3
Triathlon	1	0	1
Volleyball	2	2	4
Weightlifting	2	1	3
Wrestling	0	1	1
Total	30	29	59

== Medalists ==
The following competitors from El Salvador won medals at the games. In the by discipline sections below, medalists' names are in bold text.

Medal	Name	Sport	Event	Date
Gold	Roberto Hernández	Archery	Men's individual compound	August 10
Gold	Paulina Zamora	Bodybuilding	Women's bikini fitness	August 10
Gold	Yuri Rodriguez	Bodybuilding	Men's class bodybuilding	August 10
Bronze	Bryan Pérez	Surfing	Men's open surf	August 5

**Medals by sport**
**Sport**	1st place, gold medalist(s)	2nd place, silver medalist(s)	3rd place, bronze medalist(s)	**Total**
Bodybuilding	2	0	0	2
Archery	1	0	0	1
Surfing	0	0	1	1
**Total**	**3**	**0**	**1**	**4**

== Archery ==
At the first qualifier, El Salvador won two quota spots (one each in men's recurve compound). El Salvador would later qualify a woman in the recurve category in the final qualification tournament.

Athlete	Event	Ranking Round		Round of 32	Round of 16	Quarterfinals	Semifinals	Final / BM	Rank
Athlete	Event	Score	Seed	Opposition Score	Opposition Score	Opposition Score	Opposition Score	Opposition Score	Rank
**Roberto Hernández**	Men's compound individual	708	3 **Q**	—N/a	Bye	Brassaroto (BRA); **W** 148–143	Gonzalez de Alba (MEX); **W** 146–145	Gellenthien (USA); **W** 147–146	1st place, gold medalist(s)
Oscar Guillén	Men's recurve individual	634	27 **Q**	Alvarado (MEX); **L** 2–6	Did not advance				
Marcela Cortez	Women's recurve individual	579	29 **Q**	Rendón (COL); **L** 2–6	Did not advance				
Oscar Guillén; Marcela Cortez	Mixed team recurve	1216	12 **Q**	—N/a	D'Almeida/ dos Santos (BRA); **W** 6–2	Duenas/ Barrett (CAN); **L** 3–5	Did not advance		

== Artistic swimming ==
El Salvador qualified a duet of two athletes, marking the first time the country has competed in the sport since 2003.

Women

Athlete	Event	Technical Routine		Free Routine (Final)			
Athlete	Event	Points	Rank	Points	Rank	Total points	Rank
Fernanda Cruz; Grecia Mendoza	Duet	63.1943	11	65.4333	10	128.6276	11

== Athletics (track and field) ==
El Salvador qualified two male athletes.

Key

- Note–Ranks given for track events are for the entire round
- **NH** = No height
- **SB** = Season's best

Men
Track event

Athlete	Event	Semifinals		Final	
Athlete	Event	Result	Rank	Result	Rank
Pablo Andrés Ibáñez	400 m hurdles	50.70 **SB**	10	Did not advance	

Field events

Athlete	Event	Final	
Athlete	Event	Distance	Position
Natán Rivera	Pole vault	NH	

== Badminton ==
El Salvador qualified a team of two badminton athletes (one per gender).

Athlete	Event	Round of 64	Round of 32	Round of 16	Quarterfinals	Semifinals	Final	Rank
Athlete	Event	Opposition Result	Opposition Result	Opposition Result	Opposition Result	Opposition Result	Opposition Result	Rank
Uriel Artiga	Men's singles	Bye	Coelho (BRA); **L** 0–2 (19–21, 11–21)	Did not advance				
Fatima Fuentes	Women's singles	Bye	Wang (USA); **L** 0–2 (8–21, 8–21)	Did not advance				
Uriel Artiga; Fatima Fuentes	Mixed doubles	—N/a	Solís / Soto (GUA); **L** 0–2 (15–21, 11–21)	Did not advance				

== Basque pelota ==
El Salvador qualified one athlete in basque pelota.

Men

Athlete	Event	Group stage					Semifinals	Final / BM	
Athlete	Event	Opposition Result	Opposition Result	Opposition Result	Opposition Result	Rank	Opposition Result	Opposition Result	Rank
Efrain Segura	Individual fronton rubber ball	González (CUB); **L** 0–2	Andreasen (ARG); **L** 0–2	Carrasco (PER); **L** 0–2	Letelier (CHI); **W** 2–0	4	Did not advance		

== Bodybuilding ==
El Salvador qualified a full team of two bodybuilders (one male and one female). In the sport's debut at the Pan American Games, the country won both gold medals on offer.

Athlete	Event	Prejudging		Final	
Athlete	Event	Points	Rank	Points	Rank
**Yuri Rodriguez**	Men's classic bodybuilding	—N/a		36	1st place, gold medalist(s)
**Paulina Zamora**	Women's bikini fitness	—N/a		21	1st place, gold medalist(s)

- No results were provided for the prejudging round, with only the top six advancing.

== Bowling ==
El Salvador qualified a full team of two men and two women, for a total of four bowlers, by finishing among the top five at the PABCON Champion of Champions.

Athlete	Event	Qualification / Final														Round robin											Semifinal	Final	
Athlete	Event	Block 1						Block 2						Total	Rank	Round robin											Semifinal	Final	
Athlete	Event	1	2	3	4	5	6	7	8	9	10	11	12	Total	Rank	1	2	3	4	5	6	7	8	Total	Grand total	Rank	Opposition Result	Opposition Result	Rank
Luis Bendeck	Men's singles	182	245	267	251	214	244	187	206	167	211	217	237	2628	12	Did not advance													
Júlio Acosta	Men's singles	171	233	176	193	180	191	170	202	186	209	210	196	2317	30	Did not advance													
Luis Bendeck; Júlio Acosta	Men's doubles	334	409	374	384	343	301	353	397	433	430	366	376	4500	15	—N/a													
Edith Quintanilla	Women's singles	247	188	173	180	202	235	161	199	163	183	187	174	2292	22	Did not advance													
Sandra Quintanilla	Women's singles	141	197	157	203	191	217	131	194	197	216	166	190	2200	25	Did not advance													
Edith Quintanilla; Sandra Quintanilla	Women's doubles	334	312	336	382	324	391	327	320	329	355	402	365	4177	15	—N/a													

== Boxing ==
El Salvador qualified two women boxers.

Women

Athlete	Event	Quarterfinals	Semifinals	Final	Rank
Athlete	Event	Opposition Result	Opposition Result	Opposition Result	Rank
Cynthia Madrid	51 kg	Cardozo (VEN); **L** 0–5	Did not advance		
Yamileth Solórzano	57 kg	Ramirez (USA); **L** 0–5	Did not advance		

== Fencing ==
El Salvador qualified one female fencer in the foil discipline, after Puerto Rico declined its quota.

Women

Athlete	Event	Pool Round		Round of 16	Quarterfinals	Semifinals	Final	
Athlete	Event	Victories	Seed	Opposition Score	Opposition Score	Opposition Score	Opposition Score	Rank
Ivania Carballo	Foil	0	17	Did not advance				

== Gymnastics ==
=== Artistic ===
El Salvador qualified one male and one female artistic gymnast.

Men

Athlete	Event	Qualification						Total	Rank	Final						Total	Rank
Athlete	Event	F	PH	R	V	PB	HB	Total	Rank	F	PH	R	V	PB	HB	Total	Rank
Fabio Chicas	Individual all-around	8.500	11.650	9.500	12.250	12.200	9.850	63.950	38	Did not advance							

Women

Athlete	Event	Qualification				Total	Rank	Final				Total	Rank
Athlete	Event	V	UB	BB	F	Total	Rank	V	UB	BB	F	Total	Rank
Paola Ruano	Individual all-around	12.400	11.025	11.800	11.350	46.575	27 **Q**	12.150	10.825	11.700	11.100	45.775	23

== Judo ==
El Salvador qualified one male judoka. Juan Diego Turcios qualified to compete in the 81 kg event, but did not make weight. Therefore he did not compete in the event.

== Roller sports ==
El Salvador qualified two women in the speed discipline.

=== Speed ===
Women

Athlete	Event	Heat		Semifinal		Final	
Athlete	Event	Time	Rank	Time	Rank	Time/Points	Rank
Ivonne Nóchez	300 m time trial	—N/a				27.685	8
Ivonne Nóchez	500 m	48.091	4	Did not advance			
Elizabeth Giron	10,000 m points race	—N/a				EL (19)	

== Rowing ==
El Salvador qualified one female rower.

Women

Athlete	Event	Heats		Repechage		Final	
Athlete	Event	Time	Rank	Time	Rank	Time	Rank
Adriana Escobar	Lwt. single sculls	8:45.78	4 **R**	8:01.08	3 **FB**	8:12.86	8

Qualification Legend: FB=Final B R=Repechage
- Results given are within the heat.

== Sailing ==
El Salvador qualified a spot in the men's laser event.

Men

Athlete	Event	Race											Net points	Final rank
Athlete	Event	1	2	3	4	5	6	7	8	9	10	M	Net points	Final rank
Enrique Arathoon	Laser	13	2	5	7	4	9	3	7	8	1	2	48	4

== Shooting ==
El Salvador qualified nine sport shooters (three men and six women). Later the country swapped one women's pistol quota for a men's pistol spot.

Men

Athlete	Event	Qualification		Final	
Athlete	Event	Points	Rank	Points	Rank
Angel Barquero	10 m air pistol	552	29	Did not advance	
Angel Barquero	25 m rapid fire pistol	539	16	Did not advance	
Jorge Pimentel	10 m air pistol	550	31	Did not advance	
Jorge Pimentel	25 m rapid fire pistol	538	17	Did not advance	
Israel Gutierrez	10 m air rifle	552	29	Did not advance	
Israel Gutierrez	50 m rifle three positions	1131	20	Did not advance	
Noe Preza	10 m air rifle	605.9	22	Did not advance	
Noe Preza	50 m rifle three positions	612.8	16	Did not advance	

Women

Athlete	Event	Qualification		Final	
Athlete	Event	Points	Rank	Points	Rank
Ashely Dominguez	10 m air pistol	530	26	Did not advance	
Ashely Dominguez	25 m pistol	539	16	Did not advance	
Erika Landaverde	10 m air pistol	556	17	Did not advance	
Erika Landaverde	25 m pistol	553	19	Did not advance	
Ana Ramirez	10 m air rifle	618.1	9	Did not advance	
Ana Ramirez	50 m rifle three positions	1131	15	Did not advance	
Melissa Perez	10 m air rifle	601.2	21	Did not advance	
Johanna Pineda	50 m rifle three positions	1136	12	Did not advance	

Mixed

Athlete	Event	Qualification		Final	
Athlete	Event	Points	Rank	Points	Rank
Jorge Pimentel; Erika Landaverde	10 metre air pistol	731	21	Did not advance	
Angel Barquero; Ashely Dominguez	10 metre air pistol	721	23	Did not advance	
Israel Gutierrez; Ana Ramirez	10 metre air rifle	820.4	11	Did not advance	
Noe Preza; Melissa Perez	10 metre air rifle	815.6	15	Did not advance	

== Swimming ==
El Salvador qualified six swimmers (two men and four women), including three in the open water discipline.

Key

- Note – Ranks given are for the entire round
- **NR** – National record
- **QA** – Qualified for Final A
- **QB** – Qualified for Final B

Athlete	Event	Heat		Final	
Athlete	Event	Time	Rank	Time	Rank
Marcelo Acosta	Men's 200 m freestyle	1:52.91	15 **QB**	1:52.87	13
Marcelo Acosta	Men's 400 m freestyle	3:52.17	4 **QA**	3:54.20	7
Marcelo Acosta	Men's 800 m freestyle	—N/a		8:00.98	5
Marcelo Acosta	Men's 1500 m freestyle	—N/a		15:21.03	4
Nector Segovia	Men's 10 k open water	—N/a		2:13:21.0	18
Carmen Marquez Orellana	Women's 100 m backstroke	1:01.92 **NR**	5 **QA**	1:03.07	7
Carmen Marquez Orellana	Women's 200 m backstroke	2:18.68 **NR**	11 **QB**	2:14.76 **NR**	9
Elisa Funes Jovel	Women's 100 m breaststroke	1:14.85 **NR**	15 **QB**	1:14.67 **NR**	15
Elisa Funes Jovel	Women's 200 m breaststroke	2:43.92	16 **QB**	2:41.49 **NR**	14
Elisa Funes Jovel	Women's 200 m individual medley	2:27.80	19	Did not advance	
Fatima Flores	Women's 10 k open water	—N/a		2:18:05.9	16
Fatima Portillo	Women's 10 k open water	—N/a		2:25:22.2	17

== Squash ==
El Salvador qualified a men's team of three athletes, marking its return to the sport at the Pan American Games for the first time since 2011.

Men
Singles and Doubles

Athlete	Event	Round of 32	Round of 16	Quarterfinals	Semifinals	Final	
Athlete	Event	Opposition Result	Opposition Result	Opposition Result	Opposition Result	Opposition Result	Rank
Israel Aguilar	Singles	Franklin (BER); **L** 1–3	Did not advance				
Jose Porras Diaz	Singles	Franco (GUA); **L** 1–3	Did not advance				
Israel Aguilar; José Mejia	Doubles	—N/a	Delierre (CAN); Sachvie (CAN); **L** 1–2	Did not advance			

Team

Athlete	Event	Group stage			Round of 16	9 to 12 round	11th place match	
Athlete	Event	Opposition Result	Opposition Result	Rank	Opposition Result	Opposition Result	Opposition Result	Rank
Israel Aguilar; José Mejia; Jose Porras Diaz	Team	Argentina; **L** 0–3	Canada; **L** 0–3	3 **Q**	Peru; **L** 0–2	Jamaica; **L** 0–2	Bermuda; **W** 2–1	11

== Surfing ==
El Salvador qualified three surfers (one man and two women) in the sport's debut at the Pan American Games.

Athlete	Event	Main round 1	Main round 2	Repechage 1	Repechage 2	Main round 3	Repechage 3	Repechage 4	Repechage 5	Main round 4	Final / BM	Rank
Athlete	Event	Opposition Result	Opposition Result	Opposition Result	Opposition Result	Opposition Result	Opposition Result	Opposition Result	Opposition Result	Opposition Result	Opposition Result	Rank
**Bryan Perez**	Men's open surf	Muniz (ARG); **W** 11.80–6.17	Santos (BRA); **W** 14.94–7.67	Bye		Fillingim (CRC); **W** 12.57–11.34	Bye			Mesinas (PER); **L** 8.60–17.47	Usuna (ARG); **L** 13.70–16.27	3rd place, bronze medalist(s)
Vanessa Cortez	Women's open surf	Zelasko (CAN); **L** 5.13–9.57	Did not advance	Giunta (PER); **L** 4.70–11.33	Did not advance							=13
Josselyn Alabi	Women's SUP surf	4.70 **Q**	5.80	Bye	Soriano (ECU); **L** 5.11–5.34	Did not advance						=7

== Tennis ==
El Salvador qualified three male tennis players.

Men

Athlete	Event	First round	Round of 32	Round of 16	Quarterfinals	Semifinals	Final / BM	
Athlete	Event	Opposition Score	Opposition Score	Opposition Score	Opposition Score	Opposition Score	Opposition Score	Rank
Alberto Alvarado	Singles	González (GUA); **W** 6–1, 6–4	Barrios (CHI); **L** 2–6, 2–6	Did not advance				
Kyle Johnson	Singles	Maginley (ANT); **L** 4–6, 3–6	Did not advance					
Lluis Miralles	Singles	Newman (BAH); **L** 2–6, 2–6	Did not advance					
Alberto Alvarado; Lluis Miralles	Doubles	—N/a	King / Redlicki (USA); **L** 1–6, 1–6	Did not advance				

== Triathlon ==
El Salvador received a wild card to enter one male triathlete.

Men

Athlete	Event	Swim (1.5 km)	Trans 1	Bike (40 km)	Trans 2	Run (8.88 km)	Total	Rank
Ricardo Garcia	Individual	Lapped						

== Volleyball ==
=== Beach ===
El Salvador qualified four beach volleyball athletes (two men and two women).

Athletes	Event	Preliminary Round				Qualifying finals	Placement round	Placement match	Rank
Athletes	Event	Opposition Score	Opposition Score	Opposition Score	Rank	Opposition Score	Opposition Score	Opposition Score	Rank
Carlos Escobar; David Vargas	Men's	Satterfield / Burik (USA); **L** 0–2 (12–21, 10–21)	Capogrosso / Azaad (ARG); **L** 0–2 (12–21, 12–21)	Stewart / Phillip (TTO); **W** 2–0 (21–19, 21–13)	3 **Q**	Ontiveros / Virgen (MEX); **L** 0–2 (16–21, 12–21)	Leonardo / García (GUA); **L** 1–2 (13–21, 21–17, 11–15)	Medina / Sánchez (DOM); **L** 0–2 (11–21, 14–21)	12
María Vargas; Kathya Vasquez	Women's	Allcca / Mendoza (PER); **L** 0–2 (10–21, 10–21)	Delís / Martínez (CUB); **L** 1–2 (21–18, 12–21, 7–15)	Caballero / Valiente (PAR); **L** 0–2 (17–21, 13–21)	4	—N/a	Alvarado / Bethancourt (GUA); **W** 2–0 (21–15, 22–20)	Davidson / Grant (TTO); **W** 2–0 (22–20, 21–14)	13

== Weightlifting ==
El Salvador qualified three weightlifters (two men and one woman).

Athlete	Event	Snatch		Clean & jerk		Total	Rank
Athlete	Event	Result	Rank	Result	Rank	Total	Rank
Julio Salamanca	Men's 61 kg	105	8	137	8	242	8
Juan Carlos Álvarez	Men's 96 kg	125	14	160	13	285	13
Caren Torres de Fuentes	Women's +87 kg	90	4	115	4	205	4

== Wrestling ==
El Salvador received one wild card in the women's freestyle discipline.

Freestyle
Women

Athlete	Event	Quarterfinals	Semifinals	Repechage	Final / BM	Rank
Athlete	Event	Opposition Result	Opposition Result	Opposition Result	Opposition Result	Rank
Josselyn Portillo	76 kg	Olaya (COL); **L** 0–3^{F}	Did not advance			

== See also ==
- El Salvador at the 2020 Summer Olympics
