= Todd Harrity =

American squash player (born 1990)

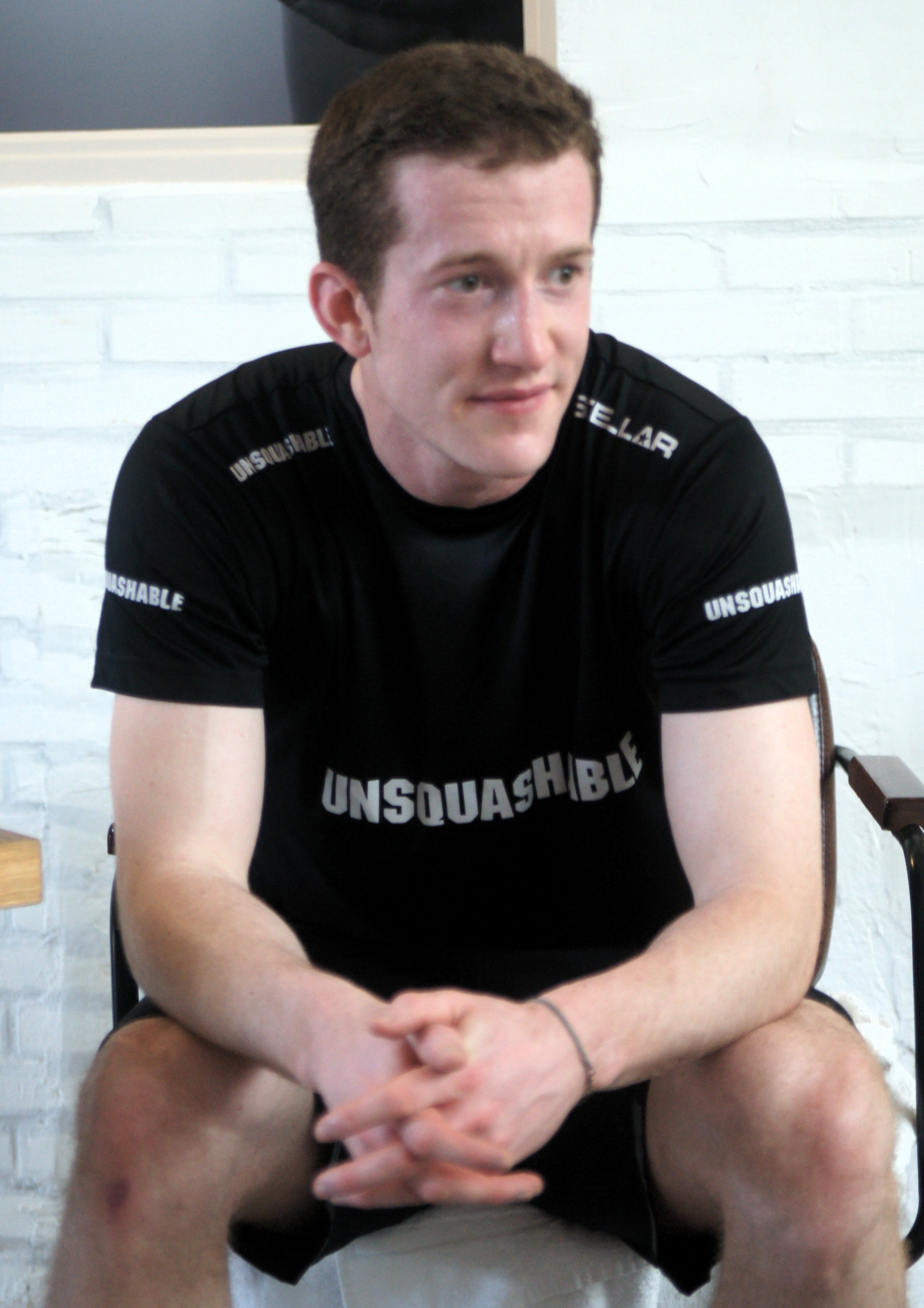
- Harrity in 2019

Personal information
- Born: September 16, 1990 (age 35) Bryn Mawr, Pennsylvania, U.S.
- Height: 6 ft 1 in 1.85 m (6 ft 1 in)
- Weight: 174

Sport
- Country: United States
- Turned pro: 2013
- Coached by: Hadrian Stiff, Scott Devoy
- Retired: 2024
- Racquet used: Unsquashable

Men's singles
- Highest ranking: No. 34 (February 2022)
- Title: 4
- Tour final: 11
Medal record
Men's squash
Representing United States
Pan American Games
Gold medal – first place	2019 Lima	Team
Gold medal – first place	2019 Lima	Doubles
Bronze medal – third place	2015 Toronto	Team
Pan American Championship
Gold medal – first place	2016 Hartford	Team
Bronze medal – third place	2014 Toluca	Team
Bronze medal – third place	2018 Cayman Island	Individual
Bronze medal – third place	2018 Cayman Island	Doubles
Bronze medal – third place	2018 Cayman Island	Team

Todd Harrity (born September 16, 1990) is a retired American professional squash player who reached a career-high PSA ranking of World No. 34 in February 2022. He is a three-time National Champion, winning in 2015, 2016 and 2019. In 2018, he came out as gay, announcing it on Twitter, thus becoming the first openly gay professional male squash player in the world. At the time he was ranked No. 1 in the United States out of all male squash players.

He is class of 2013 at Princeton University, and he played number 1 all four years for the Tigers varsity squash team. He won the individual championship during his sophomore season. He led the Tigers to the team national championship during his junior season.

== Career statistics ==
=== PSA Titles (4) ===
All Results for Todd Harrity in PSA World's Tour tournament

No.	Date	Tournament	Opponent in Final	Score in Final
1.	22 March 2014	New York Pro Open, US	(India) Ramit Tandon	11-8, 11-8, 11-4
2.	2 November 2014	Madison Open, US	(England) Declan James	11-4, 11-6, 11-4
3.	23 September 2018	International Tournament Madeira Island, Portugal	(England) Joshua Masters	10-12, 11-5, 11-9, 11-3
4.	2 April 2021	HCL SRFI Indian Tour Tournament Chennai, India	(India) Mahesh Mangaonkar	11-9, 11-6, 7-11, 2-11, 11-0

=== PSA Tour Finals (Runner-Up) (7) ===
No.	Date	Tournament	Opponent in Final	Score in Final
1.	13 April 2014	Rochester ProAm, US	(Australia) Zac Alexander	11-6, 4-11, 11-13, 11-13
2.	9 November 2014	Minneapolis Open, US	(Germany) Jens Schoor	8-11, 11-9, 5-11, 8-11
3.	10 November 2015	President Gold Cup International Tournament, Pakistan	(Pakistan) Nasir Iqbal	8-11, 9-11, 5-11
4.	14 February 2016	Cactus Open, US	(Egypt) Omar Abdel Meguid	7-11, 10-12, 8-11, 5-11
5.	3 December 2016	Salt Lake City Open, US	(Mexico) Alfredo Avila	5-11, 6-11, 12-14
6.	4 March 2017	Oregon Open, US	(Finland) Olli Tuominen	11-8, 13-15, 7-11, 4-11
7.	6 May 2018	CAC Open, US	(United States) Chris Hanson	6-11, 9-11, 11-9, 9-11
