= Gonzalo Miranda (squash player) =

Argentine squash player (born 1989)

Personal information
- Born: November 28, 1989 (age 36) La Plata, Argentina
- Height: 1.68 m (5 ft 6 in)

Sport
- Country: Argentina
- Turned pro: 2008
- Coached by: Juan Martin Hargouas
- Retired: Active
- Racquet used: Head

Men's singles
- Highest ranking: No. 80 (July, 2013)
- Current ranking: No. 88 (June, 2014)
Medal record
Men's squash
Representing Argentina
South American Games
Bronze medal – third place	2010 Medellín	Team
- Updated on June, 2014

Gonzalo Miranda (born November 28, 1989, in La Plata) is a professional squash player who represents Argentina. He reached a career-high world ranking of World No. 80 in July 2013.
