= Nick Sachvie =

Canadian squash player (born 1991)

Personal information
- Born: December 22, 1991 (age 34) St. Catharines, Ontario, Canada
- Education: Cornell University
- Years active: 4
- Height: 175 cm (5 ft 9 in)
- Weight: 74 kg (163 lb)

Sport
- Country: Canada
- Handedness: Right-handed
- Turned pro: 2014
- Coached by: Chris Sachvie
- Retired: Active
- Racquet used: Harrow
- Highest ranking: No. 64 (November 2017)
- Current ranking: N/A
- Title: 6
- Tour final: 8
Medal record
Men's Squash
Representing Canada
Pan American Games
Silver medal – second place	2019 Lima	Doubles
Bronze medal – third place	2019 Lima	Team
- Updated on March 2018

Nicholas William Sachvie (born December 22, 1991) is a Canadian professional squash player. He reached a highest world ranking of 64 in 2017. He is currently retired from the Professional Tour as of 2023.

Sachvie attended Cornell University and majored in Communications while playing for the men's squash team from 2010 to 2014.

He is the 2017 and 2019 Canadian National Champion and he played for Canada in the 2015 and 2017 WSF World Team Squash Championships.

In 2008, a 16-year-old Sachvie won the under-17 national squash championship.
