= Lewis Walters =

Jamaican squash player (born 1988)

Personal information
- Born: 26 February 1988 (age 38) Nottingham, England

Sport
- Country: Jamaica
- Handedness: Right Handed
- Turned pro: 2007
- Retired: Active
- Racquet used: Salming

Men's singles
- Highest ranking: No. 91 (October 2013)
- Current ranking: No. 512 (June 2020)
- Updated on June 2020

Lewis Walters (born 26 February 1988 in Nottingham) is a Jamaican squash player. He has represented Jamaica at the Commonwealth Games.

In 2019, Walters was named to Jamaica's 2019 Pan American Games team.
