= César Salazar (squash player) =

Mexican squash player (born 1988)

Personal information
- Full name: César Orlando Salazar Martínez
- Born: January 3, 1988 (age 38) San Luis Potosí, Mexico
- Height: 1.78 m (5 ft 10 in)
- Weight: 66 kg (146 lb)

Sport
- Country: Mexico
- Turned pro: 2007
- Coached by: Arturo Salazar Rodriguez
- Retired: Active
- Racquet used: Head

Men's singles
- Highest ranking: No. 17 (November 2017)
- Current ranking: No. 27 (July, 2016)
- Title: 2
- Tour final: 6
Medal record
Men's squash
Representing Mexico
Pan American Games
Gold medal – first place	2011 Guadalajara	Team
Silver medal – second place	2011 Guadalajara	Singles
Silver medal – second place	2023 Santiago	Doubles
Bronze medal – third place	2019 Lima	Singles
Bronze medal – third place	2019 Lima	Doubles
Bronze medal – third place	2019 Lima	Team
Bronze medal – third place	2023 Santiago	Singles
- Updated on November 2017

César Orlando Salazar Martínez (born January 3, 1988) is a Mexican professional squash player. He reached a career-high world ranking of World No. 17 in November 2017. He won a gold and a silver medal at the 2011 Pan American Games, in the team and singles events. His twin brother Arturo Israel Salazar Martínez is also a professional squash player.
