= Micah Franklin (squash player) =

Bermudian squash player (born 1992)

Personal information
- Born: 2 September 1992 (age 33) Bermuda

Sport
- Country: Bermuda
- Coached by: Denise Somers, Lucas Buit
- Retired: Active
- Highest ranking: No. 149 (April 2017)
- Current ranking: No. 160 (December 2019)
- Tour final: 1
- Updated on February 2018

Micah Franklin (born 2 September 1992) is a Bermudian professional squash player. As of February 2018, he was ranked number 223 in the world.
