= Shawn Delierre =

Canadian squash player (born 1982)

Personal information
- Full name: Shawn Adam Delierre
- Born: May 25, 1982 (age 44) Montreal, Quebec. Canada
- Height: 5 ft 11 in (180 cm)
- Weight: 155 lb (70 kg)

Sport
- Turned pro: 2000
- Coached by: Yvon Provençal
- Retired: 2024
- Racquet used: Black Knight Lava

Men's singles
- Highest ranking: No. 35 (March 2013)
- Title: 17
- Tour final: 34
Medal record
Men's squash
Representing Canada
Pan American Games
Gold medal – first place	2015 Toronto	Team
Silver medal – second place	2007 Rio de Janeiro	Team
Silver medal – second place	2011 Guadalajara	Team
Silver medal – second place	2019 Lima	Doubles
Bronze medal – third place	2007 Rio de Janeiro	Singles
Bronze medal – third place	2011 Guadalajara	Singles
Bronze medal – third place	2015 Toronto	Singles
Bronze medal – third place	2019 Lima	Team
- Updated on September 2024

Shawn Adam Delierre (born May 25, 1982) is a retired professional squash player who represented Canada. He reached a career-high world ranking of World No. 35 in March 2013.

He has played in three of the four longest ever PSA squash matches.
