= Chris Hanson (squash player) =

American professional squash player (born 1990)

Personal information
- Born: December 12, 1990 (age 35) New York, United States
- Education: Dartmouth College
- Height: 5 ft 10 in (178 cm)
- Weight: 165 lb (75 kg)

Sport
- Country: United States
- Handedness: Left Handed
- Turned pro: 2010
- Coached by: Rodney Martin
- Retired: 2022
- Racquet used: Harrow

Men's singles
- Highest ranking: No. 60 (July 2018)
- Current ranking: No. 73 (Marich 2020)
- Title: 5
- Tour final: 7
Medal record
Men's squash
Representing the United States
Pan American Games
Gold medal – first place	2019 Lima	Team
Gold medal – first place	2019 Lima	Doubles
- Updated on February, 2018

Chris Hanson (born 12 December 1990 in New York) is a former American professional squash player. He achieved his career-high PSA ranking of world number 60 in July 2018.
