= Arturo Salazar =

Mexican squash player (born 1988)

Personal information
- Full name: Arturo Israel Salazar Martínez
- Born: January 3, 1988 (age 38) San Luis Potosí, Mexico
- Height: 1.75 m (5 ft 9 in)
- Weight: 70 kg (154 lb)

Sport
- Turned pro: 2006
- Coached by: Arturo Salazar Rodriguez (father)
- Retired: Active
- Racquet used: Black Knight

Men's singles
- Highest ranking: No. 36 (January, 2011)
- Current ranking: No. 50 (July, 2016)
- Title: 6
- Tour final: 8
Medal record
Men's squash
Representing Mexico
Pan American Games
Gold medal – first place	2011 Guadalajara	Doubles
Gold medal – first place	2011 Guadalajara	Team
Bronze medal – third place	2011 Guadalajara	Singles
Bronze medal – third place	2019 Lima	Doubles
Bronze medal – third place	2019 Lima	Team
- Updated on July, 2016

Arturo Israel Salazar Martínez (born January 3, 1988), known as Arturo Salazar, is a professional squash player who represented Mexico. He reached a career-high world ranking of World No. 36 in January 2011. He won two gold medals and a bronze at the 2011 Pan American Games, in the Doubles, Team and Singles events. His twin brother César Orlando Salazar Martínez is also a professional squash player.
