= Christopher Binnie =

Jamaican squash player (born 1989)

Personal information
- Full name: Christopher James Binnie
- Born: 26 January 1989 (age 37) Kingston, Jamaica
- Height: 1.90 m (6 ft 3 in)
- Weight: 91 kg (201 lb)

Sport
- Country: Jamaica

Men's singles
- Highest ranking: No. 65 (January, 2018)
- Current ranking: No. 76 (13 June 2020)
- Title: 1
- Updated on June 2020

Christopher James Binnie (born 26 January 1989, in Kingston) is a professional squash player who represents Jamaica. He reached a career-high world ranking of World No. 65 in January 2018.

In 2019, Binnie was named to Jamaica's 2019 Pan American Games team.
