= Ecuador at the 2019 Pan American Games =

- IOC code: ECU
- NOC: Ecuadorian National Olympic Committee
- Website: coe.org.ec

in Lima, Peru 26 July – 11 August 2019
- Competitors: 201 in 28 sports
- Flag bearer: Tamara Salazar (opening)
- Medals: Gold 10 Silver 7 Bronze 15 Total 32

Pan American Games appearances (overview)
- 1951; 1955; 1959; 1963; 1967; 1971; 1975; 1979; 1983; 1987; 1991; 1995; 1999; 2003; 2007; 2011; 2015; 2019; 2023; 2027

Ecuador competed in the 2019 Pan American Games in Lima, Peru from July 26 to August 11, 2019.

On 10 July 2019, the Ecuadorian National Olympic Committee officially named the team of 191 athletes competing in twenty eight sports. Weightlifter Tamara Salazar was named as the country's flag bearer during the opening ceremony.

The Ecuadorian team consisted of 201 athletes, the largest ever team the country has ever sent to the Pan American Games.

== Medalists ==
The following Ecuadorian competitors won medals at the games.

Medal	Name	Sport	Event	Date
Gold	Neisi Dájomes	Weightlifting	Women's 76 kg	July 29
Gold	Andrés Montaño	Wrestling	Men's Greco-Roman 60 kg	August 7
Gold	Lissette Antes	Wrestling	Women's Freestyle 57 kg	August 8
Silver	Alexandra Escobar	Weightlifting	Women's 59 kg	July 28
Silver	Andrea Pérez Peña	Shooting	Women's 10 metre air pistol	July 27
Bronze	Claudia Cardenas	Taekwondo	Women's 49 kg	July 27
Bronze	Eduarda Fuentes	Roller sports	Women's free skating	July 27
Bronze	Angie Palacios	Weightlifting	Women's 64 kg	July 29
Bronze	Jorge Arroyo	Weightlifting	Men's 109 kg	July 29
Bronze	Tamara Salazar	Weightlifting	Women's 87 kg	July 30
Bronze	Lisseth Ayoví	Weightlifting	Women's +87 kg	July 30
Bronze	Mauricio Sánchez	Wrestling	Men's Freestyle 65 kg	August 9

Medals by sport
Sport	1st place, gold medalist(s)	2nd place, silver medalist(s)	3rd place, bronze medalist(s)	Total
Wrestling	2	0	1	3
Wrestling	2	0	1	3
Weightlifting	1	1	4	6
Roller sports	0	0	1	1
Taekwondo	0	0	1	1
Total	3	2	7	12

Medals by day
Day	Date	1st place, gold medalist(s)	2nd place, silver medalist(s)	3rd place, bronze medalist(s)	Total
1	July 27	0	1	2	3
2	July 28	0	1	0	1
3	July 29	1	0	2	3
4	July 30	0	0	2	2
5	July 31	0	0	0	0
6	August 1	0	0	0	0
7	August 2	0	0	0	0
8	August 3	0	0	0	0
9	August 4	0	0	0	0
10	August 5	0	0	0	0
11	August 6	0	0	0	0
12	August 7	1	0	0	1
13	August 8	1	0	0	1
14	August 9	0	0	1	1
15	August 10	0	0	0	0
16	August 11	0	0	0	0
Total		3	2	7	12

Medals by gender
Gender	1st place, gold medalist(s)	2nd place, silver medalist(s)	3rd place, bronze medalist(s)	Total
Female	2	2	5	9
Male	1	0	2	3
Mixed	0	0	0	0
Total	3	2	7	12

== Competitors ==
The following is the list of number of competitors (per gender) participating at the games per sport/discipline.

Sport	Men	Women	Total
Archery	3	0	3
Badminton	1	1	2
Bodybuilding	1	1	2
Bowling	0	2	2
Boxing	3	1	4
Canoeing	5	4	9
Cycling	9	11	20
Equestrian	4	1	5
Football	18	0	18
Golf	1	2	3
Judo	3	2	5
Karate	3	2	5
Modern pentathlon	2	2	4
Racquetball	2	2	4
Roller sports	1	3	4
Rowing	0	1	1
Sailing	5	3	8
Shooting	3	4	7
Surfing	3	3	6
Table tennis	3	2	5
Taekwondo	4	3	7
Tennis	2	2	4
Triathlon	2	2	4
Weightlifting	5	6	11
Wrestling	4	6	10
Total	87	66	153

== Archery ==
Men

Athlete	Event	Ranking round		Round of 32	Round of 16	Quarterfinal	Semifinal	Final / BM	
Athlete	Event	Score	Rank	Opposition Result	Opposition Result	Opposition Result	Opposition Result	Opposition Result	Rank
José Álvarez Muñoz	Individual recurve	645	24	Peters (CAN); L 2–6	Did not advance				
Lester Ortegon	Individual recurve	624	29	Duenas (CAN); L 0–6	Did not advance				
Mateo Oleas	Individual compound	677	9	—N/a	Cid (GUA); L 139–142	Did not advance			

== Badminton ==
Ecuador qualified a team of two badminton athletes (one per gender).

=== Singles ===
Athlete	Event	Round of 64	Round of 32	Round of 16	Quarterfinal	Semifinal	Final / BM	Rank
Athlete	Event	Opposition Result	Opposition Result	Opposition Result	Opposition Result	Opposition Result	Opposition Result	Rank
Andy Jésus Baque	Men's singles	Bye	Opti (SUR); L 17–21, 21–13, 17–21	Did not advance				17
Maria Delia Zambrano	Women's singles	Montre (CHI); W 21–12, 21–10	Ortiz (CUB); W 21–14, 21–13	Sotomayor (GUA); L 7–21, 21–19, 9–21	Did not advance			9

=== Doubles ===
Athlete	Event	Round of 32	Round of 16	Quarterfinal	Semifinal	Final / BM	Rank
Athlete	Event	Opposition Result	Opposition Result	Opposition Result	Opposition Result	Opposition Result	Rank
Andy Jésus Baque; Maria Delia Zambrano	Mixed doubles	Seixas / Yau (PAN); W 21–11, 21–7	Hurlburt-Yu / Wu (CAN); L 9–21, 8–21	Did not advance			9

== Bodybuilding ==
Ecuador qualified a full team of two bodybuilders (one male and one female).

Athlete	Event	Pre-judging		Final	
Athlete	Event	Points	Ranking	Points	Ranking
Angelo Carpio	Men's class bodybuilding	—N/a		69	5
Ana Lucia Falconi	Women's bikini fitness	—N/a		48	6

- There were no results in the pre-judging stage, with only the top six advancing.

== Bowling ==
Ecuador qualified two women bowlers.

Athlete	Event	Qualification / Final														Round robin											Semifinal	Final	
Athlete	Event	Block 1						Block 2						Total	Rank	Round robin											Semifinal	Final	
Athlete	Event	1	2	3	4	5	6	7	8	9	10	11	12	Total	Rank	1	2	3	4	5	6	7	8	Total	Grand total	Rank	Opposition Result	Opposition Result	Rank
Diana Rosero	Women's singles	130	158	147	198	191	190	151	167	209	168	188	212	2109	29	Did not advance													
Dennise Quezada	Women's singles	141	160	158	136	203	235	214	168	172	157	159	199	2102	30	Did not advance													
Diana Rosero; Dennise Quezada	Women's doubles	312	357	345	328	299	332	307	424	358	374	364	380	4178	14	—N/a													

== Boxing ==
Ecuador qualified four boxers (three men and one woman).

Men

Athlete	Event	Quarterfinal	Semifinal	Final	
Athlete	Event	Opposition Result	Opposition Result	Opposition Result	Rank
Luis Delgado	–49 kg	Collazo (PUR); L 0–5	Did not advance		
Jean Caicedo	–56 kg	De La Cruz (DOM); L 0–5	Did not advance		
Julio Castillo	–91 kg	Julio (COL); W 3–2	José Lucar (PER); W 5–0	Savón (CUB); L 1–4	2nd place, silver medalist(s)

Women

Athlete	Event	Quarterfinal	Semifinal	Final	
Athlete	Event	Opposition Result	Opposition Result	Opposition Result	Rank
Erika Pachito	–75 kg	Caicedo (COL); L 1–4	Did not advance		(bronze) ^{[a]}

- ^{a} Jessica Caicedo, of Colombia, lost the gold medal for doping violation.

== Canoeing ==
=== Sprint ===
Men

Athlete	Event	Heat		Semifinal		Final	
Athlete	Event	Time	Rank	Time	Rank	Time	Rank
Cristhian Sola	C-1 1000 m	4.33.588	4 SF	4:29.466	5	Did not advance	
Daniel León; Cristhian Sola	C-2 1000 m	—N/a				4:21.378	5
César de Cesare	K-1 200 m	34.983	1 QF	Bye		35.906	2nd place, silver medalist(s)
Walter Rojas	K-1 1000 m	4.05.342	7 SF	4:11.403	7	Did not advance	
Willy Montaño; Walter Rojas	K-2 1000 m	3:52.883	5 SF	3:55.339	6	Did not advance	

Women

Athlete	Event	Heat		Semifinal		Final	
Athlete	Event	Time	Rank	Time	Rank	Time	Rank
Belén Ibarra	C-1 200 m	57.018	4 SF	52.260	5	Did not advance	
Stefanie Perdomo	K-1 200 m	42.411	3 SF	40.686	1 QF	44.444	5
Maoli Angulo	K-1 500 m	2.11.128	4 SF	2:06.088	4 QF	2:07.239	8
Maoli Angulo; Tamya Rios	K-2 500 m	2:03.474	4 SF	1:56.170	4 QF	1:59.142	8

Qualification legend: QF – Qualify to final; SF – Qualify to semifinal

== Cycling ==
=== BMX ===
Freestyle

Athlete	Event	Qualification		Final	
Athlete	Event	Points	Rank	Points	Rank
Júlio Mosquera	Men's	83.50	1	83.00	4
Anahi Molina	Women's	52.50	6	59.00	6

Racing

Athlete	Event	Ranking round		Quarterfinal		Semifinal		Final	
Athlete	Event	Time	Rank	Points	Rank	Time	Rank	Time	Rank
Alfredo Campo	Men's	33.328	3	3	1 Q	3	1 Q	32.113	1st place, gold medalist(s)
Emilio Falla	Men's	34.779	12	8	3 Q	19	6	Did not advance	
Domenica Azuero	Women's	33.698	7	25	7	Did not advance			
Karla Carrera	Women's	42.959	11	15	5	Did not advance			

=== Mountain biking ===
Athlete	Event	Time	Rank
William Tobay	Men's	1:32:32	8
Miryam Padilla	Women's	1:34:15	6
Michela Molina	Women's	1:34:45	7

=== Road cycling ===
Athlete	Event	Time	Rank
Jhonnatan Prado	Men's road race	4:06:28	5
Bayron de la Cruz	Men's road race	4:09:03	19
Jimmy Montenegro	Men's road race	4:09:05	22
Jefferson Ortíz	Men's road race	4:09:06	23
Miryam Padilla	Women's road race	2:19:54	20
Leslye Rivera	Women's road race	2:20:33	23
Dayana García	Women's road race	2:21:16	30
Miryam Padilla	Women's time trial	27:23.87	12
Ariadna Herrera	Women's time trial	30:15.12	21

=== Track cycling ===
Sprint

Athlete	Event	Qualification		Round of 16	Repechage 1	Quarterfinals	Semifinals	Final	
Athlete	Event	Time	Rank	Opposition Time	Opposition Time	Opposition Result	Opposition Result	Opposition Result	Rank
Katheryne Sevilla	Women's	12.339	11 Q	Bayona (COL); L 11.904	Hacohen (GUA), Vera (ARG); L 12.037	Did not advance			
Genesis Tarira	Women's	12.677	12 Q	Mitchell (CAN); L 11.755	Gaviria (COL), Palmer (JAM); L 11.962	Did not advance			
Katheryne Sevilla; Genesis Tarira	Women's team	37.482	5	—N/a				Did not advance	

Keirin

Athlete	Event	Heats	Repechage	Final
Athlete	Event	Rank	Rank	Rank
Katheryne Sevilla	Women's	5 R	5 FB	11

Madison

Athlete	Event	Points	Rank
Carlos Quishpe; Bayron de la Cruz	Men's	4	6
Ariadna Teran; Dayana García	Women's	DNF	

Pursuit

Athlete	Event	Qualification		Semifinals	Finals	
Athlete	Event	Time	Rank	Opposition Result	Opposition Result	Rank
Leslye Rivera; Miryam Padilla; Dayana García; Ariadna Terán	Women's team	5:04.560	7 Q	Cuba; L 4:58.333	—N/a	7

Omnium

Athlete	Event	Scratch race		Tempo race		Elimination race		Points race		Total	
Athlete	Event	Rank	Points	Points	Rank	Rank	Points	Points	Rank	Points	Rank
Carlos Quishpe	Men's	11	20	26	8	8	26	5	9	77	10
Dayana García	Women's	15	12	18	12	9	24	−20	14	34	14

== Equestrian ==
Ecuador qualified five equestrians.

=== Dressage ===
Athlete	Horse	Event	Qualification						Grand Prix Freestyle / Intermediate I Freestyle	
Athlete	Horse	Event	Grand Prix / Prix St. Georges		Grand Prix Special / Intermediate I		Total		Grand Prix Freestyle / Intermediate I Freestyle	
Athlete	Horse	Event	Score	Rank	Score	Rank	Score	Rank	Score	Rank
Carolina Espinosa	Findus K	Individual	65.500	23	65.647	21	131.147	20 Q	66.025	17

=== Eventing ===
Athlete	Horse	Event	Dressage		Cross-country		Jumping		Total	
Athlete	Horse	Event	Points	Rank	Points	Rank	Points	Rank	Points	Rank
Carlos Narvaez	Que Loco	Individual	39.00	21	Eliminated		Did not advance			
Nicolas Wettstein	Onzieme Framoni	Individual	35.10	16	Eliminated		Did not advance			

=== Jumping ===
Athlete	Horse	Event	Qualification								Final					
Athlete	Horse	Event	Round 1		Round 2		Round 3		Total		Round A		Round B		Total	
Athlete	Horse	Event	Faults	Rank	Faults	Rank	Faults	Rank	Faults	Rank	Faults	Rank	Faults	Rank	Faults	Rank
Ivan Christiansen	Olivia Z	Individual	16.58	42	Eliminated		Did not advance									
Diego Vivero	Zambia Mystic Rose	Individual	9.78	30	8	15	8	16	25.78	25 Q						

== Football ==
Summary

Team	Event	Group stage				Semifinal	Final / BM / Pl.	
Team	Event	Opposition Result	Opposition Result	Opposition Result	Rank	Opposition Result	Opposition Result	Rank
Ecuador men	Men's tournament	Argentina; L 2–3	Panama; D 1–1	Mexico; L 0–2	4	—N/a	Peru; L 1–1 (PSO 2–4)	8

=== Men's tournament ===
Ecuador qualified a men's team of 18 athletes.

Group A

Pos	Team	Pld	W	D	L	GF	GA	GD	Pts	Qualification
1	Mexico	3	2	1	0	4	1	+3	7	Knockout stage
2	Argentina	3	2	0	1	7	5	+2	6	Knockout stage
3	Panama	3	0	2	1	2	4	−2	2	Fifth place match
4	Ecuador	3	0	1	2	3	6	−3	1	Seventh place match

Source: Lima 2019
Rules for classification: Tie-breakers
29 July 2019
13:00

Ecuador	2–3	Argentina
Rezabala 75'; Naula 89'	Report	Valenzuela 33'; Gaich 40', 76'

Estadio Universidad San Marcos
Referee: Gustavo Murillo (Colombia)
1 August 2019
10:00

Panama	1–1	Ecuador
Zúñiga 27'	Report	Campana 53'

Estadio Universidad San Marcos
Referee: Miguel Santibañez (Peru)
4 August 2019
13:00

Ecuador	0–2	Mexico
	Report	Vásquez 25'; Lainez 90+5'

Estadio Universidad San Marcos
Referee: Wagner Magalhães (Brazil)

Seventh place match

7 August 2019
10:00

Ecuador	1–1	Peru
Vivar 88'	Report	Minda 83' (o.g.)
Penalties
Vallecilla (penalty scored); Alcivar (penalty missed); Porozo (penalty scored); Minda (penalty missed)	2–4	(penalty missed) Barco; (penalty scored) Acuy; (penalty scored) Arakaki; (penalty scored) Pretell; (penalty scored) Rivera

Estadio Universidad San Marcos
Referee: José Argote (Venezuela)

== Golf ==
Ecuador qualified three golfers (one man and two women).

Athlete	Event	Round 1	Round 2	Round 3	Round 4	Total		
Athlete	Event	Result	Result	Result	Result	Result	Par	Ranking
José Miranda	Men's individual	71	74	73	75	293	+9	26
Mercedes Solange Gómez	Women's individual	78	75	75	76	304	+20	25
Maria B. Arizaga	Women's individual	79	DSQ					
José Miranda; Mercedes Solange Gómez; Maria B. Arizaga	Mixed team	149	149	146	150	594	+26	14

== Judo ==
Men

Athlete	Event	Round of 16	Quarterfinals	Semifinals	Repechage	Final / BM	
Athlete	Event	Opposition Result	Opposition Result	Opposition Result	Opposition Result	Opposition Result	Rank
Lenin Preciado	−60 kg	Bye	J Futtinico (COL); W 10S2–00S1	D Calle (PER); W 10–00	R Torres (BRA); L 00S1–01S1	—N/a	2nd place, silver medalist(s)
J Angulo	−100 kg	Bye	L Medina (DOM); W 10–01	L Smith III (USA); L 00S3–10S1	—N/a	Bronze medal contest J Osório (PER); W 01S2–00S2	3rd place, bronze medalist(s)
F Figueroa	+100 kg	Bye	A Tadehara (USA); W 10–00	P Pineda (VEN); L 00S2–10	—N/a	Bronze medal contest F Solís (CHI); W 01S2–00S1	3rd place, bronze medalist(s)

Women

Athlete	Event	Round of 16	Quarterfinals	Semifinals	Repechage	Final / BM	
Athlete	Event	Opposition Result	Opposition Result	Opposition Result	Opposition Result	Opposition Result	Rank
Estefania García	−63 kg	Bye	P Awiti (MEX); L 00S2–01S1	—N/a	M Choconta (COL); W 10S2–00S3	A Castilhos (BRA); L 00S1–01S1	5
Vanessa Chala	−78 kg	Bye	L Cantero (ARG); W 10–00	K Antomarchi (CUB); L 00S1–10S1	—N/a	Bronze medal contest L Cárdenas (MEX); W 10–00S2	3rd place, bronze medalist(s)

== Karate ==
Kumite (sparring)

Athlete	Event	Round robin				Semifinal	Final	
Athlete	Event	Opposition Result	Opposition Result	Opposition Result	Rank	Opposition Result	Opposition Result	Rank
Esteban Espinoza	Men's −84 kg	Sinisterra (COL); D 0–0	Mendoza (PER); W 6–1	Valera (VEN); L 0–1	3	Did not advance		
Franklin Mina	Men's +84 kg	Rojas (CHI); L 0–1	Lenis (COL); L 1–2	Beltrán (PER); W 1–0	3	Did not advance		
Jacqueline Factos	Women's −61 kg	Grande (PER); L 0–3	Sequera (VEN); L 3–4	dos Santos (BRA); W 5–0	4	Did not advance		

Kata (forms)

Athlete	Event	Pool round 1		Pool round 2		Final / BM	
Athlete	Event	Score	Rank	Score	Rank	Opposition Result	Rank
Andrés Tejada	Men's individual	23.18	3 Q	22.66	2 Q	Bronze medal contest Cención (PAN); L 23.32–23.98	5
Cristina Orbe	Women's individual	23.74	4	Did not advance			

== Modern pentathlon ==
Ecuador qualified four modern pentathletes (two men and two women).

Athlete	Event	Fencing (Épée one touch)			Swimming (200 m freestyle)			Riding (Show jumping)			Shooting / Running (10 m laser pistol / 3000 m cross-country)			Total	
Athlete	Event	V – D	Rank	MP points	Time	Rank	MP points	Penalties	Rank	MP points	Time	Rank	MP points	MP points	Rank
Nelson Torres Robles	Men's individual	21–10	4	243	2:06.50	7	297	EL		0	11:43.00	19	597	1137	22
Andrés Torres Robles	Men's individual	12–19	22	182	2:04.86	5	301	DNS		0	11:39.00	18	601	1084	25
Nelson Torres Robles; Andrés Torres Robles	Men's relay	10–16	11	188	1:51.47	1	328	57	8	243	10:54.00	5	646	1405	6
Lourdes Marcela Hernández	Women's individual	10–21	25	167	2:31.85	21	247	14	9	286	14:47.00	413	21	1113	13
Valerie Calero	Women's individual	7–24	29	145	2:26.92	13	257	DNS						402	31
Lourdes Marcela Hernández; Valerie Calero	Women's relay	14–26	8	181	2:17.60	5	275	EL		0	14:52.00	7	408	864	7
Andrés Torres Robles; Lourdes Marcela Hernández	Mixed relay	18–30	11	186	2:03.99	4	303	27	6	273	12:39.00	8	541	1303	9

== Racquetball ==
Ecuador qualified four racquetball athletes (two men and two women).

Men

Athlete	Event	Qualifying Round robin				Round of 16	Quarterfinals	Semifinals	Final	Rank
Athlete	Event	Match 1	Match 2	Match 3	Rank	Opposition Result	Opposition Result	Opposition Result	Opposition Result	Rank
Fernando Ríos	Men's singles	(Mexico) Álvaro Beltrán; L 0–2	(Costa Rica) Felipe Camacho; L 1–2	-	4	Did not advance				
José Ugalde	Men's singles	(Costa Rica) Andrés Acuña; L 1–2	(Bolivia) Conrrado Moscoso; W 2–1	-	3 Q	(Mexico) Rodrigo Montoya; L 0–2	Did not advance			9
José Ugalde; Fernando Ríos	Men's doubles	(Bolivia) Roland Keller; Conrrado Moscoso; L 0–2	(Colombia) Sebastian Franco; Mario Mercado; W 2–0	(Peru) Jonathan Luque; Sebastian Mendiguri; W 2–0	3	(Guatemala) Edwin Galicia; Juan Salvatierra; L 0–2	Did not advance			9
José Ugalde; Fernando Ríos	Men's team	—N/a				Cuba; W 2–1	Mexico; L 0–2	Did not advance		5

Women

Athlete	Event	Qualifying Round robin				Round of 16	Quarterfinals	Semifinals	Final	Rank
Athlete	Event	Match 1	Match 2	Match 3	Rank	Opposition Result	Opposition Result	Opposition Result	Opposition Result	Rank
María José Muñoz	Singles	(Bolivia) Angelica Barrios; L 0–2	(Cuba) Loraine Felipe; W 2–0	(Chile) Carla Muñoz; L 0–2	3	Não avançou				
María Paz Muñoz	Singles	(United States) Kelani Lawrence; W 2–0	(Costa Rica) Maricruz Ortiz; W 2–0	(Canada) Jennifer Saunders; W 2–0	1 Q	(Mexico) Montserrat Meija; W 2–1	(Argentina) Natalia Mendez; L 1–2	Não avançou		5
María José Muñoz; María Paz Muñoz	Doubles	(United States) Kelani Lawrence; Rhonda Rajsich; L 0–2	(Mexico) Paola Longoria; Samantha Solis; L 0–2	-	3	(Canada) Frédérique Lambert; Jennifer Saunders; L 1–2	Não avançou			9
María José Muñoz; María Paz Muñoz	Team	—N/a				Chile; W 2–0	Mexico; L 0–2	Did not advance		5

== Roller sports ==
=== Artistic ===
Athlete	Event	Short program		Long program		Total	
Athlete	Event	Score	Rank	Score	Rank	Score	Rank
Eduarda Fuentes	Women's	27.37	3	43.31	4	70.68	3rd place, bronze medalist(s)

=== Speed ===
Athlete	Event	Preliminary		Semifinal		Final	
Athlete	Event	Time	Rank	Time	Rank	Time	Rank
Jorge Villacorte	Men's 10,000 m elimination	—N/a				16:37.708	3rd place, bronze medalist(s)
María Loreto Armijos	Women's 300 m time trial	—N/a				27.223	5
María Loreto Armijos	Women's 500 m	47.593	4	Did not advance			
Gabriela Sarmiento	Women's 10,000 m elimination	—N/a				Eliminated	

== Rowing ==
Women

Athlete	Event	Heat		Repechage		Semifinal		Final	
Athlete	Event	Time	Rank	Time	Rank	Time	Rank	Time	Rank
Kristen del Rosário	Single sculls	8:40.12	5 R	8:40.29	5 FB	—N/a		8:30.64	9

== Sailing ==
Men

Athlete	Event	Race													Total	
Athlete	Event	1	2	3	4	5	6	7	8	9	10	11	12	M	Points	Rank
Matias Dyck	Laser	~~18~~	14	8	8	13	18	6	6	12	12	—N/a		Did not advance	97	12

Women

Athlete	Event	Race													Total	
Athlete	Event	1	2	3	4	5	6	7	8	9	10	11	12	M	Points	Rank
Rafaela Arteaga	Laser radial	12	~~16~~	16	16	15	15	15	12	16	15; STP	—N/a		Did not advance	132	15

Mixed

Athlete	Event	Race													Total	
Athlete	Event	1	2	3	4	5	6	7	8	9	10	11	12	M	Points	Rank
Jesus Bailon; Andrea Quevedo	Snipe	8	1	8	8	~~9~~	8	5	5	9	9	—N/a		Did not advance	61	8
Julio Velez; Irene Suarez; Eduardo Viteri	Lightning	3	5	5	4	~~6~~	4	5	4	6	4	—N/a		4	44	4

Open

Athlete	Event	Race											Total	
Athlete	Event	1	2	3	4	5	6	7	8	9	10	M	Pontos	Posição
Jonathan Martinetti	Sunfish	1	5	6	~~13~~	7	5	5	8	9	11	Did not advance	57	8

== Shooting ==
Ecuador qualified seven sport shooters (three men and four women).

Men

Athlete	Event	Qualification		Final	
Athlete	Event	Points	Rank	Points	Rank
Yautung Cueva	10 m air pistol	568	11	Did not advance	
Yautung Cueva	25 m rapid fire pistol	524	21	Did not advance	
Milton Camacho	10 m air rifle	622.7	2 Q	139.6	7
Milton Camacho	50 m rifle three position	DNS		Did not advance	
Cristian Santacruz	10 m air rifle	605.1	24	Did not advance	
Cristian Santacruz	50 m rifle three position	1134	17	Did not advance	

Women

Athlete	Event	Qualification		Final	
Athlete	Event	Points	Rank	Points	Rank
Andrea Pérez	10 m air pistol	562	5 Q	234.7	2nd place, silver medalist(s)
Andrea Pérez	25 m pistol	578	2 Q	18	3rd place, bronze medalist(s)
Diana Durango	10 m air pistol	555	13	Did not advance	
Diana Durango	25 m pistol	583	1 Q	27+2+3	2nd place, silver medalist(s)
Ana Karina Cruz	10 m air rifle	610.9	17	Did not advance	
Ana Karina Cruz	50 m rifle three position	1132	14	Did not advance	
Sofía Padilla	10 m air rifle	610.6	18	Did not advance	
Sofía Padilla	50 m rifle three position	1126	22	Did not advance	

Mixed

Athlete	Event	Qualification		Final	
Athlete	Event	Points	Rank	Points	Rank
Yautung Cueva; Andrea Pérez	10 m air pistol	765 PR	1 Q	411.0	3rd place, bronze medalist(s)
Milton Camacho; Sofía Padilla	10 m air pistol	10 m air rifle	815.7	14	Did not advance
Cristian Santacruz; Ana Karina Cruz	813.9	10 m air rifle	17	Did not advance	

== Surfing ==
Ecuador qualified six surfers (three men and three women) in the sport's debut at the Pan American Games.

Artistic

Athlete	Event	Round 1	Round 2	Round 3	Round 4	Repechage 1	Repechage 2	Repechage 3	Repechage 4	Repechage 5	Bronze medal	Final	
Athlete	Event	Opposition Result	Opposition Result	Opposition Result	Opposition Result	Opposition Result	Opposition Result	Opposition Result	Opposition Result	Opposition Result	Opposition Result	Opposition Result	Rank
Israel Barona	Men's open	Santos (BRA); L 7.60–14.50	Did not advance			Muñiz (ARG); L 6.50–17.00	Did not advance						
Isidro Villao	Men's longboard	Clemente (PER), Schweizer (URU); L 7.36	Did not advance			Cortéz (CHI), Ferrer (PUR); L 8.17 Q	Gil (ARG); L 5.90–11.60	Did not advance					
Dominic Barona	Women's open	Berrezueta (ECU); W 13.50–5.00 Q	Indurain (ARG); W 12.57–7.74 Q	Detmers (MEX); W 12.24–10.66 Q	Rosas (ECU); L 5.07–12.40	Bye					Pellizzari (ARG); W 17.10–12.17 Q	Rosas (ECU); L 12.50–13.90	2nd place, silver medalist(s)
Susana Berrezueta	Women's open	Barona (ECU); L 5.00–13.50	Did not advance			Cortez (ESA); W 11.33–4.70 Q	Zelasko (CAN); W 13.67–9.00 Q	Gómez (COL); W 13.93–13.26 Q	Pellizzari (ARG); L 1.57–12.90	Did not advance			
Michell Soriano	Women's stand up paddleboard	Gómez (COL), Cosoleto (ARG); L 1.73	Did not advance			Bruhwiler (CAN), Pérez (CHI); L 5.00 Q	Alabi (ESA); W 5.34–5.14 Q	Appleby (USA); L 1.50–5.54	Did not advance				
Michell Soriano	Women's longboard	Reyes (PER), Fernandez (CHI); L 5.50 Q	Calmon (BRA), Dempfle-Olin (CAN); L 5.13	Did not advance		Bye	Fernández (CHI); W 7.84–3.33 Q	Gil (ARG); L 6.03–6.60	Did not advance				

Race

Athlete	Event	Time	Rank
Carlos Gómez	Men's stand up paddleboard	31:19.2	8

== Table tennis ==
Men

Athlete	Event	Group stage			First round	Second round	Quarterfinal	Semifinal	Final / BM	
Athlete	Event	Opposition Result	Opposition Result	Rank	Opposition Result	Opposition Result	Opposition Result	Opposition Result	Opposition Result	Rank
Rodrigo Tapia	Singles	—N/a			Cifuentes (ARG); L 2–4	Did not advance				
Alberto Miño	Singles	—N/a			Navas (VEN); V 4–0	Hazin (CAN); W 4–1	Jha (USA); L 1–4	Did not advance		
Alberto Miño; Emiliano Riofrio	Doubles	—N/a				Kumar / Tio (USA); L 3–4	Did not advance			
Alberto Miño; Rodrigo Tapia; Emiliano Riofrio	Team	United States; L 0–3	Puerto Rico; L 1–3	3	—N/a		Did not advance			

Women

Athlete	Event	Group stage			First round	Second round	Quarterfinal	Semifinal	Final / BM	
Athlete	Event	Opposition Result	Opposition Result	Rank	Opposition Result	Opposition Result	Opposition Result	Opposition Result	Opposition Result	Rank
Mylena Plaza	Singles	—N/a			Wu (USA); L 0–4	Did not advance				
Nathaly Paredes	Singles	—N/a			Takahashi (BRA); L 1–4	Did not advance				
Nathaly Paredes; Mylena Plaza	Doubles	—N/a				Argüelles / Codina (ARG); L 1–4	Did not advance			

Mixed

Athlete	Event	First round	Quarterfinal	Semifinal	Final / BM	
Athlete	Event	Opposition Result	Opposition Result	Opposition Result	Opposition Result	Rank
Alberto Miño; Nathaly Paredes	Doubles	Bye	Afanador / Díaz (PUR); L 0–4	Did not advance		

== Taekwondo ==
Kyorugi (sparring)

Men

Athlete	Event	Preliminary round	Quarterfinal	Semifinal	Repechage	Final / BM	
Athlete	Event	Opposition Result	Opposition Result	Opposition Result	Opposition Result	Opposition Result	Rank
Adrián Miranda	–58 kg	Oviedo (CRC); L 22–23	Did not advance				
Carlos Caicedo	–68 kg	León (PER); L 15–17	Did not advance				
Darlyn Padilla	–80 kg	Cobas (CUB); L 2–22	Did not advance				
Jesús Perea	+80 kg	Baeza (CHI); W 27–25	Alba (CUB); L 7–21	Did not advance	—N/a	Bronze medal contest Andrade (BRA); L 4–15	5

Women

Athlete	Event	Preliminary round	Quarterfinal	Semifinal	Repechage	Final / BM	
Athlete	Event	Opposition Result	Opposition Result	Opposition Result	Opposition Result	Opposition Result	Rank
Maria Bucheli	–49 kg	Souza (MEX); L 11–25	Did not advance				
Mell Mina	–57 kg	Vieira (BRA); W 10–5	Évolo (ARG); L 7–8	Did not advance			

Poomsae (forms)

Athlete	Event	Score	Rank
Claudia Cárdenas	Women's individual	7.210	3rd place, bronze medalist(s)

== Tennis ==
Men

Athlete	Event	Round of 64	Round of 32	Round of 16	Quarterfinals	Semifinals	Final / BM	
Athlete	Event	Opposition Score	Opposition Score	Opposition Score	Opposition Score	Opposition Score	Opposition Score	Rank
Gonzalo Escobar	Singles	Bye	Cerúndolo (ARG); L 3–6, 2–6	Did not advance				
Roberto Quiroz	Singles	Bye	Estrella (DOM); W 7–5, 6–1	Barrios (CHI); L 0–6, 3–6	Did not advance			
Gonzalo Escobar; Roberto Quiroz	Doubles	—N/a	Bye	King / Redlicki (USA); W 6–3, 6–0	Barrios / Tabilo (CHI); W 6–4, 6–4	Arias / Zeballos (BOL); W 6–3, 6–4	Andreozzi / Bagnis (ARG); W 6–4, 3–6, 10–8	1st place, gold medalist(s)

Women

Athlete	Event	Round of 32	Round of 16	Quarterfinals	Semifinals	Final / BM	
Athlete	Event	Opposition Score	Opposition Score	Opposition Score	Opposition Score	Opposition Score	Rank
Mell Reasco	Singles	Weedon (GUA); W 6–4, 6–4	Podoroska (ARG); L 3–6, 2–6	Did not advance			
Charlotte Paredes	Singles	Bosio (ARG); L 5–7, 3–6	Did not advance				
Charlotte Paredes; Mell Reasco	Doubles	—N/a	Cepede Royg; González (PAR); L 1–6, 2–6	Did not advance			

== Triathlon ==
Individual

Athlete	Event	Swim (1.5 km)	Trans 1	Bike (40 km)	Trans 2	Run (10 km)	Total	Rank
Juan Figueroa	Men's individual	17:50	0:48	1:00:28	0:22	32:11	1:51:37	7
Ramón Álava	Men's individual						1:54:30	18
Elizabeth Bravo	Women's individual	20:02	0:53	1:06:56	0:31	35:38	2:03:59	10
Paula Andrade	Women's individual	20:19	0:57	1:09:35	0:28	40:55	2:12:12	17

Mixed relay

Athlete	Event	Swimming (300 m)	Biking (6.6 km)	Running (1.5 km)	Total (including transitions)	Rank
Elizabeth Bravo; Juan Figueroa; Paula Andrade; Ramón Álava	Mixed relay	16:55	42:03	19:12	1:22:47	5

== Weightlifting ==
Ecuador qualified a full team of 12 weightlifters (six man and six women).

Men

Athlete	Event	Snatch		Clean & jerk		Total	
Athlete	Event	Weight	Rank	Weight	Rank	Weight	Rank
Cristhian Zurita	–61 kg	125	3	151	6	276	5
Wilmer Contreras	–96 kg	156	9	195	6	351	9
Jorge Arroyo	–109 kg	190	1	195	5	385	3rd place, bronze medalist(s)
Dixon Arroyo	–109 kg	No mark				DNF	
Fernando Salas	+109 kg	178	3	206	4	384	4

Women

Athlete	Event	Snatch		Clean & jerk		Total	
Athlete	Event	Weight	Rank	Weight	Rank	Weight	Rank
Angélica Campoverde	–49 kg	76	6	No mark		DNF	
Alexandra Escobar	–59 kg	97	1	123	2	220	2nd place, silver medalist(s)
Angie Palacios	–64 kg	105	1	123	3	228	3rd place, bronze medalist(s)
Neisi Dájomes	–76 kg	115	1	140	1	255	1st place, gold medalist(s)
Tamara Salazar	–87 kg	110	4	146	2	256	3rd place, bronze medalist(s)
Lisseth Ayoví	+87kg	115	3	140	3	255	3rd place, bronze medalist(s)

== Wrestling ==
Key:
- VT – Victory by fall.
- PP – Decision by points – the loser with technical points.
- PO – Decision by points – the loser without technical points.
- SP – Technical superiority – the loser with technical points and a margin of victory of at least 9 (Greco-Roman) or 10 (freestyle) points.
- ST – Great superiority – the loser without technical points and a margin of victory of at least 8 (Greco-Roman) or 10 (freestyle) points.
- VA – Decision by withdrawal

Men

Athlete	Event	Round of 16	Quarterfinal	Semifinal	Final / BM	
Athlete	Event	Opposition Result	Opposition Result	Opposition Result	Opposition Result	Rank
Mauricio Sánchez	Freestyle 65 kg	—N/a	L Mallqui (PER); W 15–4^{SP}	A Rudesindo (DOM); L 0-10ST	Bronze medal contest B Díaz (MEX); L 3–0^{PO}	3rd place, bronze medalist(s)
Víctor Mancheno	Freestyle 125 kg	—N/a	A Jaoude (BRA); L 5–5^{PP}	Did not advance		
Andrés Montaño	Greco-Roman 60 kg	—N/a	L Orta (CUB); W 6–6^{PP}	A Palencia (VEN); W 8-0ST	D Toro (COL); W 10–1^{SP}	1st place, gold medalist(s)
Cristhian Rivas	Greco-Roman 67 kg	N Soto (PER); L 3–3^{PP}	Did not advance			

Women

Athlete	Event	Quarterfinal	Semifinal	Final / BM	
Athlete	Event	Opposition Result	Opposition Result	Opposition Result	Rank
Jacqueline Mollocana	50 kg	P Bermúdez (ARG); W 9–2^{PP}	Y Guzmán (COL); L 1–2^{PP}	Bronze medal contest T Mallqui (PER); L 1–3^{PP}	5
Luisa Valverde	53 kg	S Hildebrandt (USA); L 0–8^{PO}	Did not advance	Bronze medal contest J Parsons (CAN); L 3–6^{PP}	5
Lissette Antes	57 kg	A Romero (MEX); W 4–1^{PP}	N Rodríguez (PUR); W 13–2^{SP}	J Burkert (USA); W 2–1^{PP}	1st place, gold medalist(s)
Mayra Antes	62 kg	J Rentería (COL); L 0–3^{PO}	Did not advance	Bronze medal contest A Yambo (PUR); L 2–4^{VT}	5
Leonela Ayoví	68 kg	M Acosta (VEN); L 0–8^{PO}	Did not advance		
Génesis Reasco	76 kg	M Capote (CUB); L 1–3^{PP}	Did not advance		
