= Jacqueline Mollocana =

Ecuadorian freestyle wrestler

Personal information
- Full name: Jacqueline del Rocío Mollocana Eleno
- Born: 29 January 1994 (age 32)

Sport
- Country: Ecuador
- Sport: Amateur wrestling
- Weight class: 50 kg
- Event: Freestyle
Medal record
Women's freestyle wrestling
Representing Ecuador
Pan American Games
Silver medal – second place	2023 Santiago	50 kg
Bolivarian Games
Gold medal – first place	2022 Valledupar	50 kg
Silver medal – second place	2017 Santa Marta	48 kg
South American Games
Gold medal – first place	2022 Asunción	50 kg
Bronze medal – third place	2018 Cochabamba	50 kg
Pan American Championships
Gold medal – first place	2024 Acapulco	50 kg
Silver medal – second place	2021 Guatemala City	50 kg
Silver medal – second place	2023 Buenos Aires	50 kg
Bronze medal – third place	2020 Ottawa	50 kg
Bronze medal – third place	2022 Acapulco	50 kg

Jacqueline del Rocío Mollocana Eleno (born 29 January 1994) is an Ecuadorian freestyle wrestler. She won the gold medal in the women's 50 kg event at the 2022 Bolivarian Games held in Valledupar, Colombia. Mollocana is a gold medalist at the South American Games and a five-time medalist, including gold, at the Pan American Wrestling Championships.

== Career ==
In 2018, Mollocana lost her bronze medal match against Mariana Díaz Muñoz of Mexico in the women's 50 kg event at the Pan American Wrestling Championships held in Lima, Peru. A month later, she won the bronze medal in the women's 50 kg event at the 2018 South American Games held in Cochabamba, Bolivia.

In 2019, Mollocana represented Ecuador at the Pan American Games held in Lima, Peru. She lost her bronze medal match against Thalía Mallqui of Peru in the women's 50 kg event.

At the 2020 Pan American Wrestling Championships held in Ottawa, Canada, she won one of the bronze medals in the 50 kg event. In the same year, she also competed in the Pan American Olympic Qualification Tournament, also held in Ottawa, Canada. She did not qualify for the 2020 Summer Olympics in Tokyo, Japan as she was eliminated in her first match.

In March 2021, Mollocana won the gold medal in the 55 kg event at the Matteo Pellicone Ranking Series 2021 held in Rome, Italy. In May 2021, she won the silver medal in the women's 50 kg event at the Pan American Wrestling Championships held in Guatemala City, Guatemala.

Mollocana won one of the bronze medals in her event at the 2022 Pan American Wrestling Championships held in Acapulco, Mexico. She won the gold medal in her event at the 2022 Bolivarian Games held in Valledupar, Colombia. Mollocana also won the gold medal in her event at the 2022 South American Games held in Asunción, Paraguay. She defeated Mariana Rojas of Venezuela in her gold medal match both at the 2022 Bolivarian Games and the 2022 South American Games.

In 2023, Mollocana won the silver medal in her event at the Pan American Wrestling Championships held in Buenos Aires, Argentina. A few months later, she also won the silver medal in the women's 50 kg event at the 2023 Pan American Games held in Santiago, Chile.

Mollocana won the gold medal in her event at the 2024 Pan American Wrestling Championships held in Acapulco, Mexico. She defeated Mariana Rojas of Venezuela in her gold medal match. Mollocana competed at the 2024 Pan American Wrestling Olympic Qualification Tournament held in Acapulco, Mexico hoping to qualify for the 2024 Summer Olympics in Paris, France. She was eliminated in her first match by Yusneylys Guzmán of Cuba. Mollocana also competed at the 2024 World Wrestling Olympic Qualification Tournament held in Istanbul, Turkey without qualifying for the Olympics. She was eliminated in her first match by Emanuela Liuzzi of Italy.

== Achievements ==
Year	Tournament	Location	Result	Event
2017	Bolivarian Games	Santa Marta, Colombia	2nd	Freestyle 48 kg
2018	South American Games	Cochabamba, Bolivia	3rd	Freestyle 50 kg
2020	Pan American Wrestling Championships	Ottawa, Canada	3rd	Freestyle 50 kg
2021	Pan American Wrestling Championships	Guatemala City, Guatemala	2nd	Freestyle 50 kg
2022	Pan American Wrestling Championships	Acapulco, Mexico	3rd	Freestyle 50 kg
2022	Bolivarian Games	Valledupar, Colombia	1st	Freestyle 50 kg
2022	South American Games	Asunción, Paraguay	1st	Freestyle 50 kg
2023	Pan American Wrestling Championships	Buenos Aires, Argentina	2nd	Freestyle 50 kg
2023	Pan American Games	Santiago, Chile	2nd	Freestyle 50 kg
2024	Pan American Wrestling Championships	Acapulco, Mexico	1st	Freestyle 50 kg
