= Racquetball at the 2019 Pan American Games – Qualification =

The following is the qualification system and qualified athletes for the racquetball at the 2019 Pan American Games competitions.

== Qualification system ==
A total of 60 racquetball athletes qualified to compete. Each nation may enter a maximum of 8 athletes (four per gender). In each gender there will be a total of 30 athletes qualified, with the 2019 Pan American Championships being used to determine the countries qualified. Peru as host nation did not qualify any athletes automatically.

== Qualification summary ==
A total of 15 countries qualified 60 athletes.

NOC	Men	Women	Athletes
Argentina	2	3	5
Bolivia	4	3	7
Canada	2	2	4
Chile	1	2	3
Colombia	2	3	5
Costa Rica	2	1	3
Cuba	2	2	4
Dominican Republic	2	2	4
Ecuador	2	2	4
Guatemala	2	2	4
Mexico	3	4	7
Peru	3		3
United States	3	2	5
Venezuela		2	2
Total: 14 NOC's	30	30	60

== Qualification timeline ==
Events	Date	Venue
2019 Pan American Racquetball Championships	April 23–28, 2019	(Colombia) Barranquilla

== Men ==
Event	Athletes per NOC	Total	Qualified
2019 Pan American Racquetball Championships	4	4	Bolivia
2019 Pan American Racquetball Championships	3	9	Mexico; United States; Peru
2019 Pan American Racquetball Championships	2	16	Canada; Costa Rica; Colombia; Ecuador; Dominican Republic; Cuba; Guatemala; Argentina
2019 Pan American Racquetball Championships	1	1	Chile
TOTAL		30	

== Women ==
Event	Athletes per NOC	Total	Qualified
2019 Pan American Racquetball Championships	4	4	Mexico
2019 Pan American Racquetball Championships	3	9	Argentina; Bolivia; Colombia
2019 Pan American Racquetball Championships	2	16	Ecuador; United States; Canada; Dominican Republic; Cuba; Guatemala; Chile; Venezuela
2019 Pan American Racquetball Championships	1	1	Costa Rica
TOTAL		30	
