= Canoeing at the 2019 Pan American Games – Men's K-1 1000 metres =

Men's K-1 1000 metres at the 2019 Pan American Games
- Venue: Albufera Medio Mundo
- Dates: July 29
- Competitors: 16 from 16 nations
- Winning time: 3:31.955

Medalists
Gold medal	Agustín Vernice	Argentina
Silver medal	Marshall Hughes	Canada
Bronze medal	Vagner Souta	Brazil

The men's K-1 1000 metres canoeing event at the 2019 Pan American Games was held between the 27 and 29 of July at the Albufera Medio Mundo in the city of Huacho.

== Results ==
=== Heats ===
Qualification Rules: 1..3->Final, 4..7 and 8th best time->Semifinals, Rest Out

==== Heat 1 ====
Rank	Athletes	Country	Time	Notes
1	Agustín Vernice	Argentina	3.34.362	F
2	Sebastian Delgado	Uruguay	3.39.182	F
3	Jesse Lishchuk	United States	3.39.762	F
4	Nael Irizarry	Puerto Rico	3.47.779	SF
5	Amado Cruz	Belize	3.48.139	SF
6	Miguel Valencia	Chile	3.57.279	SF
7	Jeffrey Gonzalez	Guatemala	4.24.327	SF
8	Matthew Robinson	Trinidad and Tobago	4.33.159	

==== Heat 2 ====
Rank	Athletes	Country	Time	Notes
1	Marshall Hughes	Canada	3:35.877	F
2	Fidel Antonio Vargas	Cuba	3:38.415	F
3	Vagner Souta	Brazil	3:41.095	F
4	Cristian Guerrero	Dominican Republic	3:43.312	SF
5	Edwin Amaya	Colombia	3:48.522	SF
6	Juan Rodriguez	Mexico	4:05.087	SF
7	Walter Rojas	Ecuador	4:05.342	SF
8	Clive Greyson	Jamaica	5:44.595	

=== Semifinal ===
Qualification Rules: 1..2->Final, Rest Out

Rank	Athletes	Country	Time	Notes
1	Juan Rodriguez	Mexico	3:44.999	F
2	Edwin Amaya	Colombia	3:45.004	F
3	Cristian Guerrero	Dominican Republic	3:45.145	
4	Miguel Valencia	Chile	3:50.795	
5	Nael Irizarry	Puerto Rico	3:56.923	
6	Amado Cruz	Belize	3:57.633	
7	Walter Rojas	Ecuador	4:11.403	
8	Jeffrey Gonzalez	Guatemala	4:28.320	

=== Final ===
Rank	Athletes	Country	Time	Notes
1st place, gold medalist(s)	Agustín Vernice	Argentina	3:31.955	
2nd place, silver medalist(s)	Marshall Hughes	Canada	3:35.907	
3rd place, bronze medalist(s)	Vagner Souta	Brazil	3:35.960	
4	Sebastian Delgado	Uruguay	3:39.135	
5	Fidel Antonio Vargas	Cuba	3:39.675	
6	Jesse Lishchuk	United States	3:45.645	
7	Juan Rodriguez	Mexico	3:45.877	
8	Edwin Amaya	Colombia	3:47.667	
