= Carla Perez =

Carla Perez may refer to:

- Carla Pérez (born 1982), Ecuadorian mountaineer and climber
- Carla Perez (actress) (born 1977), Brazilian singer, dancer, television presenter, and actress
- Carla Pérez (actress, born 1978), Spanish actress known for the 2015 film The Gunman

== See also ==
- Carola Pérez (born 1978), Spanish medical cannabis patient and manager of the International Association for Cannabinoid Medicines patient council
