= Canoeing at the 2019 Pan American Games – Men's K-2 1000 metres =

Men's K-2 1000 metres at the 2019 Pan American Games
- Venue: Albufera Medio Mundo
- Dates: July 27–29
- Competitors: 22 from 11 nations
- Winning time: 3:16.641

Medalists
Gold medal	Manuel Lascano; Agustín Vernice	Argentina
Silver medal	Jarret Kenke; Jacob Steele	Canada
Bronze medal	Osbaldo Fuentes; Mauricio Figueroa	Mexico

The men's K-2 1000 metres canoeing event at the 2019 Pan American Games was held between the 27 and 29 of July at the Albufera Medio Mundo in the city of Huacho.

== Results ==
=== Heats ===
Qualification Rules: 1..2->Final, Rest -> Semifinals

==== Heat 1 ====
Rank	Athletes	Country	Time	Notes
1	Manuel Lascano; Agustín Vernice	Argentina	3:20.426	F
2	Robert Benítez; Fidel Antonio Vargas	Cuba	3:22.199	F
3	Rafael Feliz; Cristian Guerrero	Dominican Republic	3:33.014	SF
4	Sebastian Delgado; Matias Otero	Uruguay	3:45.966	SF
5	Eddy Barranco; Nael Irizarry	Puerto Rico	3:50.676	SF
6	Matthew Robinson; Nicholas Robinson	Trinidad and Tobago	4:12.806	SF

==== Heat 2 ====
Rank	Athletes	Country	Time	Notes
1	Jarret Kenke; Jacob Steele	Canada	3:20.201	F
2	Osbaldo Fuentes; Mauricio Figueroa	Mexico	3:22.261	F
3	Owen Farleyklacik; Alexander Lee	United States	3:22.471	SF
4	Vagner Souta; Edson Silva	Brazil	3:26.081	SF
5	Willy Montaño; Walter Rojas	Ecuador	3:52.883	SF

=== Semifinal ===
Qualification Rules: 1..4->Final, Rest Out

Rank	Athletes	Country	Time	Notes
1	Owen Farleyklacik; Alexander Lee	United States	3:27.619	F
2	Vagner Souta; Edson Silva	Brazil	3:30.467	F
3	Sebastian Delgado; Matias Otero	Uruguay	3:30.504	F
4	Rafael Feliz; Cristian Guerrero	Dominican Republic	3:31.332	F
5	Eddy Barranco; Nael Irizarry	Puerto Rico	3:33.702	
6	Willy Montaño; Walter Rojas	Ecuador	3:55.339	
7	Matthew Robinson; Nicholas Robinson	Trinidad and Tobago	4:17.392	

=== Final ===
Rank	Athletes	Country	Time	Notes
1st place, gold medalist(s)	Manuel Lascano; Agustín Vernice	Argentina	3:16.641	
2nd place, silver medalist(s)	Jarret Kenke; Jacob Steele	Canada	3:17.144	
3rd place, bronze medalist(s)	Osbaldo Fuentes; Mauricio Figueroa	Mexico	3:18.439	
4	Owen Farleyklacik; Alexander Lee	United States	3:20.851	
5	Sebastian Delgado; Matias Otero	Uruguay	3:23.449	
6	Vagner Souta; Edson Silva	Brazil	3:24.309	
7	Rafael Feliz; Cristian Guerrero	Dominican Republic	3:27.024	
8	Robert Benítez; Fidel Antonio Vargas	Cuba	3:27.046	
