= Wrestling at the 2023 Pan American Games – Women's freestyle 50 kg =

Women's freestyle 50 kg at the 2023 Pan American Games
- Venue: Olympic Training Center in Ñuñoa
- Dates: November 2
- Competitors: 7 from 7 nations

Medalists
Gold medal	Yusneylys Guzmán	Cuba
Silver medal	Jacqueline Mollocana	Ecuador
Bronze medal	Mariana Rojas	Venezuela

The women's freestyle 50 kg competition of the Wrestling events at the 2023 Pan American Games in Ñuñoa was held on November 2.

== Qualification ==
The winner of each weight category at the 2021 Junior Pan American Games in Cali, Colombia qualified directly, along with the top four at the 2022 Pan American Wrestling Championships and 2023 Pan American Wrestling Championships. The host country (Chile) is guaranteed a spot in each event, but its athletes must compete in both the 2022 and 2023 Pan American Championship. If Chile does not qualify at any of the first two events, it will take the fourth spot available at the 2023 Pan American Championships. A further six wildcards (four men and two women) will be awarded to nations without any qualified athlete but took part in the qualification tournaments.

== Schedule ==
All times are local (UTC−3)

Date	Time	Event
Wednesday, 2 November 2023	10:00	Round 1
Wednesday, 2 November 2023	10:00	Round 2
Wednesday, 2 November 2023	11:00	Round 3
Wednesday, 2 November 2023	12:00	Semifinals
Wednesday, 2 November 2023	17:00	Finals

== Results ==
Legend

- F — Won by fall

Elimination groups

Group A

Pos	Athlete	Pld	W	L	CP	TP
1	Yusneylys Guzmán (CUB)	3	3	0	12	25
2	Mariana Rojas (VEN)	3	2	1	7	16
3	Thalia Freitas (BRA)	3	1	2	4	10
4	Yorlenis Morán (PAN)	3	0	3	1	6

Source: UWW

	Score		CP
Mariana Rojas (VEN)	10–0	Yorlenis Morán (PAN)	4–0 SU
Thalia Freitas (BRA)	0–10	Yusneylys Guzmán (CUB)	0–4 SU
Thalia Freitas (BRA)	1–6	Mariana Rojas (VEN)	1–3 PO1
Yusneylys Guzmán (CUB)	10–0 Fall	Yorlenis Morán (PAN)	5–0 FA
Yusneylys Guzmán (CUB)	5–0	Mariana Rojas (VEN)	3–0 PO
Thalia Freitas (BRA)	9–6	Yorlenis Morán (PAN)	3–1 PO1

Group B

Pos	Athlete	Pld	W	L	CP	TP
1	Jacqueline Mollocana (ECU)	2	2	0	8	4
2	Erin Golston (USA)	2	1	1	5	0
—	Patricia Bermúdez (ARG)	2	0	2	0	0

Source: UWW

	Score		CP
Erin Golston (USA)	WO	Patricia Bermúdez (ARG)	5–0 FO
Jacqueline Mollocana (ECU)	4–0	Erin Golston (USA)	3–0 PO
Patricia Bermúdez (ARG)	WO	Jacqueline Mollocana (ECU)	0–5 FO

Knockout round

Semifinals
Yusneylys Guzmán (CUB)	11
Erin Golston (USA)	0
Jacqueline Mollocana (ECU)	4^{F}
Mariana Rojas (VEN)	0

Finals
Yusneylys Guzmán (CUB)	5
Jacqueline Mollocana (ECU)	2
Bronze medal match
Erin Golston (USA)	0
Mariana Rojas (VEN)	3

== Final standing ==
Rank	Athlete
1st place, gold medalist(s)	Yusneylys Guzmán (CUB)
2nd place, silver medalist(s)	Jacqueline Mollocana (ECU)
3rd place, bronze medalist(s)	Mariana Rojas (VEN)
4	Erin Golston (USA)
5	Thalia Freitas (BRA)
6	Yorlenis Morán (PAN)
—	Patricia Bermúdez (ARG)
