= Wrestling at the 2019 Pan American Games – Men's Greco-Roman 60 kg =

Men's Greco-Roman 60 kg at the 2019 Pan American Games
- Venue: Miguel Grau Coliseum
- Dates: August 7
- Competitors: 8 from 8 nations

Medalists
Gold medal	Andrés Montaño	Ecuador
Silver medal	Dicther Toro	Colombia
Bronze medal	Luis Orta	Cuba
Bronze medal	Ildar Hafizov	United States

The Men's Greco-Roman 60 kg competition of the Wrestling events at the 2019 Pan American Games in Lima was held on August 7 at the Miguel Grau Coliseum.

== Results ==
All times are local (UTC−5)

=== Final ===
Quarterfinals		Semifinals		Finals
Andrés Montaño (ECU)	6
Luis Orta (CUB)	6	Andrés Montaño (ECU)	8
Joao Benavides (PER)	3	Anthony Palencia (VEN)	0
Anthony Palencia (VEN)	11			Andrés Montaño (ECU)	10
Jancel Pimentel (DOM)	0			Dicther Toro (COL)	1
Emilio Pérez (MEX)	9	Emilio Pérez (MEX)	0
Ildar Hafizov (USA)	3	Dicther Toro (COL)	9
Dicther Toro (COL)	8

=== Repechage ===
Bronze medal match
Luis Orta (CUB)	8
Anthony Palencia (VEN)	0
Ildar Hafizov (USA)	7
Emilio Pérez (MEX)	2
