= Wrestling at the 2019 Pan American Games – Women's freestyle 50 kg =

Women's Freestyle 50 kg at the 2019 Pan American Games
- Venue: Miguel Grau Coliseum
- Dates: August 8
- Competitors: 8 from 8 nations

Medalists
Gold medal	Whitney Conder	United States
Silver medal	Yusneylys Guzmán	Cuba
Bronze medal	Thalía Mallqui	Peru
Bronze medal	Carolina Castillo	Colombia

The women's freestyle 50 kg competition of the Wrestling events at the 2019 Pan American Games in Lima were held on August 8 at the Miguel Grau Coliseum.

== Results ==
All times are local (UTC−5)

=== Final ===
Quarterfinals		Semifinals		Finals
Yusneylys Guzmán (CUB)	4
Thalía Mallqui (PER)	1	Yusneylys Guzmán (CUB)	2
Jacqueline Mollocana (ECU)	9	Jacqueline Mollocana (ECU)	1
Patricia Bermúdez (ARG)	2			Yusneylys Guzmán (CUB)	2
Kamila Barbosa (BRA)	4			Whitney Conder (USA)	10
Mariana Díaz Muñoz (MEX)	1	Kamila Barbosa (BRA)	0
Carolina Castillo (COL)	0	Whitney Conder (USA)	10
Whitney Conder (USA)	10

=== Repechage ===
Bronze medal match
Thalía Mallqui (PER)	3
Jacqueline Mollocana (ECU)	1
Carolina Castillo (COL)	5
Kamila Barbosa (BRA)	2
