= Wrestling at the 2015 Pan American Games – Women's freestyle 48 kg =

Women's Freestyle 48 kg at the 2015 Pan American Games
- Venue: Mississauga Sports Centre
- Dates: July 16
- Competitors: 8 from 8 nations

Medalists
| Gold medal | Genevieve Morrison | Canada |
| Silver medal | Thalia Mallqui | Peru |
| Bronze medal | Alyssa Lampe | United States |
| Bronze medal | Carolina Castillo | Colombia |

The women's freestyle 48 kg competition of the Wrestling events at the 2015 Pan American Games in Toronto were held on July 16 at the Mississauga Sports Centre.

== Schedule ==
All times are Eastern Daylight Time (UTC-4).

| Date | Time | Round |
|---|---|---|
| July 16, 2015 | 15:02 | Quarterfinals |
| July 16, 2015 | 15:38 | Semifinals |
| July 16, 2015 | 21:08 | Bronze medal matches |
| July 16, 2015 | 21:26 | Final |

== Results ==
Legend

- F — Won by fall

=== Final ===
| Quarterfinals | | Semifinals | | Finals |
| Yusneylys Guzmán (CUB) | 15 |
| Kamila Barbosa (BRA) | 4 | Yusneylys Guzmán (CUB) | 0 |
| Geneviève Morrison (CAN) | 12 | Geneviève Morrison (CAN) | 6 |
| Alyssa Lampe (USA) | 8 | | | Geneviève Morrison (CAN) | 5 |
| Thalia Mallqui (PER) | 3 | | | Thalia Mallqui (PER) | 4 |
| Angelica Bustos (ECU) | 0 | Thalia Mallqui (PER) | 4 |
| Carolina Castillo (COL) | 10 | Carolina Castillo (COL) | 3 |
| Sehilyn Oliveros (VEN) | 0 |

=== Repechage ===
Bronze medal match
Alyssa Lampe (USA) | 12
Yusneylys Guzmán (CUB) | 2
Angelica Bustos (ECU) | 1
Carolina Castillo (COL) | 1
