= Roller sports at the 2019 Pan American Games – Women's free skating =

Women's free skating at the 2019 Pan American Games
- Venue: Polideportivo 3
- Dates: July 26–27
- Competitors: 8 from 8 nations
- Winning score: 103.17

Medalists
Gold medal	Bruna Wurts	Brazil
Silver medal	Giselle Soler	Argentina
Bronze medal	Eduarda Fuentes	Ecuador

The women's artistic skating free skating at the 2019 Pan American Games in Lima, Peru was held between July 26–27 at the Polideportivo 3.

== Results ==
8 athletes from 8 countries competed.

Rank	Name	Nation	SP	Rank	LP	Rank	Total points
1st place, gold medalist(s)	Bruna Wurts	Brazil	36.70	2	66.47	1	103.17
2nd place, silver medalist(s)	Giselle Soler	Argentina	38.53	1	53.62	2	92.15
3rd place, bronze medalist(s)	Eduarda Fuentes	Ecuador	27.37	3	43.31	4	70.68
4	Francisca Cabrera	Chile	26.14	4	41.89	5	68.03
5	Valentina Apolinar	Colombia	17.66	7	45.87	3	63.53
6	Alexis Herbert	United States	18.51	6	30.88	6	49.39
7	Agustina Suanes	Uruguay	18.83	5	22.90	7	41.73
8	Brigitte Lopez	Peru	10.98	8	15.33	8	26.31

Short Program source:
Long Program source:
