= 2022 Bolivarian Games =

Multi-sport event in Colombia

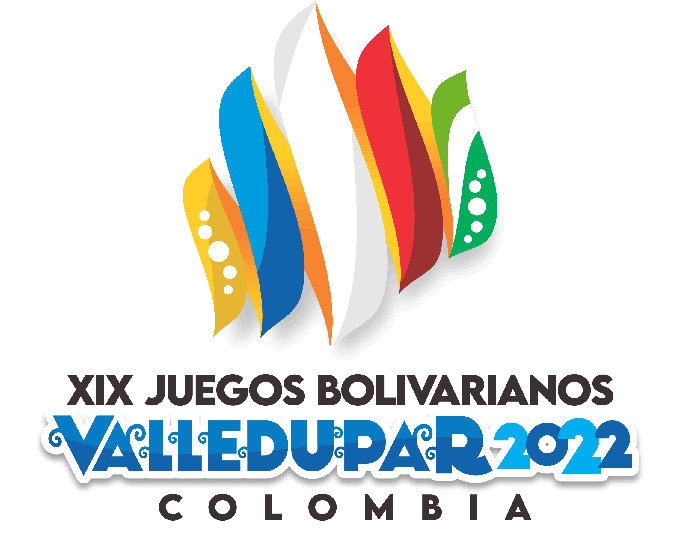
- Host city: Valledupar
- Country: Colombia
- Nations: 11
- Events: 45 sports
- Opening: 24 June 2022
- Closing: 5 July 2022
- Opened by: Guillermo Herrera
- Main venue: Estadio Armando Maestre Pavajeau
- Website: www.bolivarianosvalledupar.com

The 2022 Bolivarian Games (Spanish: Juegos Bolivarianos), officially the XIX Bolivarian Games Valledupar 2022, was an international multi-sport event that was held in Valledupar, Colombia from June 24 to July 5. It was the fifth time of the event in Colombia.

== Participating nations ==
All 7 nations of the Organización Deportiva Bolivariana (ODEBO) and 4 invited nations competed in these Games.

ODEBO nations

- Bolivia
- Chile
- Colombia (host)
- Ecuador
- Panama
- Peru
- Venezuela

Invited nations

- El Salvador
- Guatemala
- Paraguay
- Dominican Republic

== Sports ==
The Games featured 389 events in 32 different sports, encompassing a total of 45 disciplines.

- Aquatics
  - Artistic swimming (3)
  - Open water swimming (4)
  - Swimming (36)
  - Water polo (2)
- Archery (10)
- Athletics (44)
- Badminton (6)
- Baseball
  - Baseball (1)
  - Softball (1)
- Basketball
  - 3x3 basketball (2)
  - Basketball (2)
- Bowling (6)
- Boxing (13)
- Canoeing (12)
- Cycling
  - BMX racing (2)
  - Mountain biking (2)
  - Road cycling (4)
  - Track cycling (12)
- Equestrian (5)
- Fencing (12)
- Football
  - Football (2)
  - Futsal (1)
- Golf (3)
- Gymnastics
  - Artistic gymnastics (14)
  - Rhythmic gymnastics (8)
  - Trampolining (3)
- Handball (2)
- Judo (15)
- Karate (14)
- Roller sports
  - Artistic roller skating (2)
  - Inline speed skating (6)
- Rowing (12)
- Rugby sevens (2)
- Sailing (7)
- Shooting (14)
- Squash (7)
- Table tennis (7)
- Taekwondo (12)
- Tennis (5)
- Triathlon (5)
- Volleyball
  - Beach volleyball (2)
  - Volleyball (2)
- Water skiing (8)
- Weightlifting (40)
- Wrestling (17)

== Calendar ==
The sports program is as follows.

OC	Opening ceremony	●	Event competitions	1	Medal events	CC	Closing ceremony

June/July		23 Thu	24 Fri	25 Sat	26 Sun	27 Mon	28 Tue	29 Wed	30 Thu	1 Fri	2 Sat	3 Sun	4 Mon	5 Tue	Medal Events
Ceremonies (opening / closing)			OC											CC	—N/a
Aquatics	Artistic swimming								●	3					3
Aquatics	Open water swimming											2		2	4
Aquatics	Swimming										10	10	8	8	36
Aquatics	Water polo			●	●	●	2								2
Archery										2	4	●	4		10
Athletics										12	8	5	11	8	44
Badminton				●	1	●	●	5							6
Basketball	Basketball		●	●	●	●	1		●	●	●	●	●	1	2
Basketball	3x3 basketball				●	●	1				●	●	1		2
Baseball/Softball	Baseball							●	●	●	●	●	●	1	2
Baseball/Softball	Softball			●	●	●	●	●	1						2
Bowling			●	2	2	2									6
Boxing				●	●	●	●		13						13
Canoeing (sprint)									2	7	3				12
Cycling	BMX									2					2
Cycling	Mountain biking								2						2
Cycling	Road cycling		2		2										4
Cycling	Track cycling								3	3	3	3			12
Equestrian				●	●	1	●	1		1	1		1		5
Fencing		2	2	2	2	2	2								12
Football					●	●	1				●	●	1		2
Futsal				●	●	●	●	1							1
Gymnastics	Artistic gymnastics			2	2	2	8								14
Gymnastics	Rhythmic gymnastics									●	2	6			8
Gymnastics	Trampoline										●	3			3
Golf							●	●	●	3					3
Handball				●	●	●	1		●	●	●	●	1		2
Judo				5	4	5	1								15
Karate				5	7	2									14
Roller sports	Artistic skating									●	2				2
Roller sports	Speed skating			4	2										6
Rowing				4	4	4									12
Rugby sevens						●	●	2							2
Sailing						●	●	●	●	●	7				7
Shooting						3	1	4	2	●	3	1			14
Squash				●	●	●	●	7							7
Table tennis									●	2	●	3	●	2	7
Taekwondo												4	3	5	12
Tennis								●	●	●	●	1	2	2	5
Triathlon													4	1	5
Volleyball	Beach volleyball										●	●	●	2	2
Volleyball	Volleyball		●	●	●	●	1			●	●	●	●	1	2
Water skiing											●	●	8		8
Weightlifting										8	8	8	8	8	40
Wrestling												6	6	5	17
Total events		2	4	24	26	21	19	20	23	43	51	52	58	46	389
Cumulative total		2	6	30	56	77	96	116	139	182	233	285	343	389	N/A
June/July		23 Thu	24 Fri	25 Sat	26 Sun	27 Mon	28 Tue	29 Wed	30 Thu	1 Fri	2 Sat	3 Sun	4 Mon	5 Tue	Medal Events

== Medal table ==
* Host nation (Colombia)

Rank	NOC	Gold	Silver	Bronze	Total
1	Colombia*	171	104	79	354
2	Venezuela	61	69	79	209
3	Ecuador	40	51	56	147
4	Chile	37	49	71	157
5	Peru	33	40	72	145
6	Dominican Republic	22	24	44	90
7	Guatemala	7	18	23	48
8	Paraguay	7	15	15	37
9	Panama	5	8	20	33
10	El Salvador	4	5	5	14
11	Bolivia	2	6	6	14
Totals (11 entries)		389	389	470	1,248

Source: Bolivarianos Valledupar 2022 – Medallería

== Medalists ==
=== Archery ===
Recurve

Event	Gold	Silver	Bronze
Men's individual	Lester Ortegón; Ecuador	Óscar Guillen; El Salvador	Jorge Enríquez; Colombia
Women's individual	Javiera Andrades; Chile	Valentina Contreras; Colombia	Valeria Yepes; Colombia
Men's team	Colombia; Daniel Betancur; Jorge Enríquez; Daniel Pineda	Venezuela; Victor Palacio; Ricardo Vasquez; Luis Vivas	Chile; Andrés Aguilar; Pablo Pardenas; Ricardo Soto
Women's team	Colombia; Valentina Contreras; Valeria Yepes; Ana Rendón	Chile; Gabriella Abalde; Gabriela Anabalón; Javiera Andrades	Peru; Mariana Illescas; Gianella Hermoza; Alexandra Zavala
Mixed team	Venezuela; Mayra Alejandra Mendez; Ricardo Vasquez	Colombia; Jorge Enríquez; Ana Rendón	Guatemala; Gabriel Bermudez; Nancy Enriquez

Compound

Event	Gold	Silver	Bronze
Men's individual	Daniel Muñoz; Colombia	Jagdeep Singh; Colombia	Douglas Nolasco; El Salvador
Women's individual	Sara López; Colombia	Maria Valentina Suárez; Colombia	Ana Gabriela Mendoza; Venezuela
Men's team	Colombia; Pablo Gómez; Daniel Muñoz; Jagdeep Singh	Guatemala; Julio Barillas; José del Cid; Pedro Salazar	Dominican Republic; Mario Bergés; Paris Goico; Ruben Jiménez
Women's team	Colombia; Sara López; María Suárez; Alejandra Usquiano	El Salvador; Camila Alvarenga; Paola Corado; Sofía Paiz	Venezuela; Olga Bosch; Luzmary Guedez; Ana Gabriela Mendoza
Mixed team	Colombia; Sara López; Daniel Muñoz	El Salvador; Roberto Hernández; Sofía Paiz	Ecuador; Mateo Rodriguez; Blanca Rodrigo

=== Artistic swimming ===
Event	Gold	Silver	Bronze
Women's duet	Colombia; Melisa Ceballos; Estefanía Roa	Chile; Soledad Garcia; Trinidad Garcia	Peru; Yamile Carrasco; Maria Jose Ccoyllo
Mixed duet	Colombia; Jennifer Cerquera; Gustavo Sánchez	Peru; Alvaro Aronez; Sandy Quiroz	Guatemala; Kevin Garcia; Rebeca Urias
Women's free routine combination	Colombia; Sofia Abarca; Kerly Barrera; Isabella Franco; Laura Marquez; Valentina Orozco; Sara Rodríguez; Viviana Valle	Chile; Soledad Garcia; Trinidad Garcia; Theodora Garrido; Isidora Letelier; Antonia Mella; Josefa Morales; Fiona Prieto; Valentina Valdivia; Rocio Vargas	Peru; Yamile Carrasco; Maria Jose Ccoyllo; Ariana Coronado; Camila Fernandez; Mariafe Lopez; Lia Luna; Angie Paredes; Tania Patiño; Adriana Toulier

=== Baseball ===
Event	Gold	Silver	Bronze
Men	Dominican Republic; Edwin Adon; Ricardo Andújar; Trinitty Berroa; Samuel Burgos; Josuel Chalas; Nicolas Debora; Luis Espinal; Alfredo Fígaro; Randy Francisco; Marcos Frias; Rafael García; Darlin Germán; Mario German; Luis Guzman; Stanley Javier; Winston López; Omarlyn Luna; Víctor Luna; Frangely Morel; Rando Moreno; Wildert Pujols; Wandherley del Rosario; Isaac Silva; Franklin Soto	Colombia; Jose Altamiranda; Luis Arrieta; Carlos de Avila; Diover Avila; Luis Castro; Randy Cuentas; Carlos Diaz; Gabriel Hernandez; Gerson Jimenez; Jhonatan Lozada; David Lozano; Keiner Manrique; Sugar Ray Marimon; Yeizer Marrugo; Edilberto Mendoza; Bryan Niño; Gaspar Palacio; Sergio Palacio; Jhon Elkin Peluffo; Edwin Pertuz; Jesus Posso; Rafael Romero; Jesus Sepulveda; Eduin Villa	Venezuela; Oscar Abreu; Gabriel Acosta; Victor Aguilar; Keith Arevalo; Juan Daniel Bidau; Neljuk Castellano; Yhostin Chirinos; Jose Gregorio Garcia; Javier Gorrin; Anderson Hidalgo; Fernando Kelli; Junnell Ledezma; Angel Leon; Frank Lopez; Alejandro Lubo; Anderson Melendez; Beicker Mendoza; Jose Gabriel Ortega; Jose Manuel Pastrano; Cristhian Pedroza; Yoandy Rea; Ronny Rincones; Jesus Tona; Gilmael Troya

=== Bowling ===
Event	Gold	Silver	Bronze
Men's singles	Luis Eduardo Rovaina; Venezuela	Andrés Gómez; Colombia	Santiago Mejía; Colombia
Men's singles	Luis Eduardo Rovaina; Venezuela	Andrés Gómez; Colombia	Manuel Otalora; Colombia
Women's singles	María Rodríguez; Colombia	Ana Patricia Morales; Guatemala	Clara Guerrero; Colombia
Women's singles	María Rodríguez; Colombia	Ana Patricia Morales; Guatemala	Aumi Guerra; Dominican Republic
Men's doubles	Venezuela; Rogelio Felice; Luis Eduardo Rovaina	Peru; Aldo Guibu; Victor Tateishi	Guatemala; Diego Aguilar; Marvin Leon
Men's doubles	Venezuela; Rogelio Felice; Luis Eduardo Rovaina	Peru; Aldo Guibu; Victor Tateishi	Colombia; Andrés Gómez; Jaime González
Women's doubles	Colombia; Laura Plazas; María Rodríguez	Colombia; Juliana Franco; Clara Guerrero	Guatemala; Ana Patricia Morales; Sofia Rodríguez
Women's doubles	Colombia; Laura Plazas; María Rodríguez	Colombia; Juliana Franco; Clara Guerrero	Venezuela; Alicia Marcano; Karen Marcano
Men's team	Colombia; Andrés Gómez; Jaime González; Santiago Mejía; Manuel Otalora	Peru; Adrian Guibu; Aldo Guibu; Kenny Kishimoto; Victor Tateishi	Guatemala; Diego Aguilar; Armando Batres; Marvin Leon; Juan Gerardo Pineda
Men's team	Colombia; Andrés Gómez; Jaime González; Santiago Mejía; Manuel Otalora	Peru; Adrian Guibu; Aldo Guibu; Kenny Kishimoto; Victor Tateishi	Venezuela; Rogelio Felice; Rodolfo Monacelli; Luis Eduardo Rovaina; Roberto Serrapiglio
Women's team	Colombia; Juliana Franco; Clara Guerrero; Laura Plazas; María Rodríguez	Guatemala; Laura Barrios; Ana Lorena Bolaños; Ana Patricia Morales; Sofia Rodríguez	Venezuela; Patricia de Faria; Gilant Gonzalez; Alicia Marcano; Karen Marcano
Women's team	Colombia; Juliana Franco; Clara Guerrero; Laura Plazas; María Rodríguez	Guatemala; Laura Barrios; Ana Lorena Bolaños; Ana Patricia Morales; Sofia Rodríguez	Dominican Republic; Virginia Bello; Aumi Guerra; Shantalle Humgria; Ana Soto

=== Canoeing ===
Event	Gold	Silver	Bronze
Men's C1 1000 m	Alejandro Rodríguez; Colombia	Eduard Paredes; Venezuela	Michael Martinez; Chile
Men's C2 500 m	Colombia; Alejandro Rodríguez; Daniel Pacheco	Venezuela; Yasser Bello; Eduard Paredes	Ecuador; Gerson León; Cristhian Solá
Men's K1 200 m	César de Cesare; Ecuador	Miguel Valencia; Chile	Cristian Canache; Venezuela
Men's K1 1000 m	Leocadio Pinto; Colombia	Ray Acuña; Venezuela	Cristian Guerrero; Dominican Republic
Men's K2 500 m	Chile; Marcelo Godoy; Miguel Valencia	Venezuela; Ray Acuña; Cristian Canache	Dominican Republic; Alexander Concepcion; Cristian Guerrero
Men's K4 500 m	Chile; Julian Cartes; Marcelo Godoy; Matias Nuñez; Miguel Valencia	Venezuela; Ray Acuña; Cristian Canache; Rafael Cardoza; Daniel Roman	Dominican Republic; Alexander Concepcion; Cristian Guerrero; Jose Jimenez; Juan Plasencia
Women's C1 200 m	Anggie Avegno; Ecuador	Karen Roco; Chile	Manuela Gómez; Colombia
Women's C2 500 m	Colombia; Manuela Gómez; Yurely Marín	Ecuador; Neida Angulo; Anggie Avegno	Chile; Paula Gomez; Karen Roco
Women's K1 200 m	Tatiana Muñoz; Colombia	Ysumy Orellana; Chile	Stefanie Perdomo; Ecuador
Women's K1 500 m	Tatiana Muñoz; Colombia	Milenca Hernandez; Venezuela	Goviana Reyes; Chile
Women's K2 500 m	Chile; Daniela Castillo; Jeanarett Valenzuela	Colombia; Mónica Hincapié; Diexe Molina	Venezuela; Yocelin Canache; Mara Guerrero
Women's K4 500 m	Colombia; Mónica Hincapié; Diexe Molina; Karen Molina; Tatiana Muñoz	Chile; Daniela Castillo; Fernanda Iracheta; Ysumy Orellana; Jeanarett Valenzuela	Venezuela; Yocelin Canache; Giomar Fernandez; Mara Guerrero; Enexi Mendoza

=== Equestrian ===
Event	Gold	Silver	Bronze
Individual jumping	Manuel Fernandez; Dominican Republic	Priscila Simpson; Ecuador	Carlos Bedoya; Bolivia
Team jumping	Colombia; Rodrigo Díaz; Enrique Goez; Santiago Medina	Dominican Republic; Juan Jose Bancalari; María Gabriela Brugal; Manuel Fernandez; Hector Florentino	Venezuela; Luis Larrazabal; Valentina Mauri; Antonio Martinez; Juan Andres Vegas
Individual dressage	Julio Cesar Mendoza Loor; Ecuador	Diego Pérez; Colombia	Andrea Vargas; Colombia
Team dressage	Ecuador; Carolina Espinosa; Maria Jose Granja; Dealan Mendoza; Julio Cesar Mendoza Loor	Colombia; Raul Corchuelo; Juliana Gutierrez; Diego Pérez; Andrea Vargas	Venezuela; Alejandro Gomez Sigala; Ivan Lobo; Farida Nagel; Maria Andrea Podlinski
Individual eventing	Elissa Gallego; Colombia	Andres Gomez; Colombia	Gonzalo Meza; Ecuador

=== Golf ===
Event	Gold	Silver	Bronze
Men's individual	Luis Barco; Peru	José Toledo; Guatemala	Camilo Aguado; Colombia
Women's individual	Mariajo Uribe; Colombia	Daniela Darquea; Ecuador	Valery Plata; Colombia
Mixed team	Colombia; Camilo Aguado; Santiago Gomez; Valery Plata; Mariajo Uribe	Ecuador; Daniela Darquea; José Andrés Miranda; Juan Alberto Moncayo; Anika Veintemilla	Guatemala; Lucia Polo; José Rolz; José Toledo; Jasmine Youn

=== Roller sports ===
Artistic roller skating

Event	Gold	Silver	Bronze
Men's freeskating	Juan Sebastián Lemus; Colombia	Deivi Rojas; Colombia	Abel Latallada; Chile
Women's freeskating	Sandra García; Colombia	Micaela Marcelloni; Dominican Republic	Samia Alava; Ecuador

Inline speed skating

Event	Gold	Silver	Bronze
Men's 200 m	Steven Villegas; Colombia	Andrés Jiménez; Colombia	Emanuelle Silva; Chile
Men's 500 m	Andrés Jiménez; Colombia	Ricardo Verdugo; Chile	Emanuelle Silva; Chile
Men's 10 km elimination	Andrés Gómez; Colombia	Juan Mantilla; Colombia	Hugo Ramírez; Chile
Women's 200 m	Dalia Soberanis; Guatemala	María Fernanda Timms; Colombia	Ivonne Nóchez; El Salvador
Women's 500 m	María Fernanda Timms; Colombia	Catalina Lorca; Chile	Valeria Rodríguez; Colombia
Women's 10 km elimination	Gabriela Rueda; Colombia	Gabriela Vargas; Ecuador	Angy Quintero; Venezuela

=== Rugby sevens ===
Event	Gold	Silver	Bronze
Men	Chile; Clemente Armstrong; Lucca Avelli; Julio Blanc; Manuel Bustamante; Damian Fliegel; Cristóbal Game; Baltazar Jana; Gaspar Moltedo; Luca Strabucchi; Ernesto Tchimino; Benjamín de Vidts; Diego Warnken	Colombia; Juan David Agudelo; Alain Altahona; Diver Ceballos; Alvaro Gamarra; Neider García; Alejandro Guisao; Bryan Guzmán; Michael Houston; Julian Navarro; Jhojan Ortiz; Andres Tellez; Jhon Urrutia	Venezuela; Samir Abache; Wilkinson Arrieta; Larry Brito; Gustavo Carreño; Ely Chourio; Jefferson Davila; Asdrubal Figueroa; Jose Gastello; Jonas Hussein; Adrian Madriz; Davisson Pire; Nicolas Ramirez; Ramon Ruiz
Women	Paraguay; Ingrid Alfonso; Sofia Armoa; Chiara Baez; Kiara Benitez; Maria Cecilia Benza; Cinthia Cristaldo; Paula Denis; Maria Elena Gauto; Romina Gonzalez; Maira Mendez; Aracelli Nicolini; Liz Veronica Romero	Colombia; Laura Alvarez; Ángela Alzate; Daniela Alzate; María Isabel Arzuaga; Sara Florez; María Daniela Hurtado; Camila Lopera; Laura Mejia; Maribel Mestra; Valeria Muñoz; Juliana Soto; Valentina Tapias	Venezuela; Rosangela Aguilar; Kelly Angulo; Yulianny Camacho; Anibel Jose Diaz; Anibel Maria Diaz; Cristina Guidotti; Caren Gutierrez; Teresa Le Maitre; Maria de Fatima Perez; Yolanda Perez; Greisy Ramirez; Keyzhi Rojas

=== Table tennis ===
Event	Gold	Silver	Bronze
Men's singles	Jiaji Wu Zhang; Dominican Republic	Gustavo Gómez; Chile	Alberto Miño; Ecuador
Men's singles	Jiaji Wu Zhang; Dominican Republic	Gustavo Gómez; Chile	Rodrigo Tapia; Ecuador
Women's singles	Daniela Ortega; Chile	María Paulina Vega; Chile	Eva Brito; Dominican Republic
Women's singles	Daniela Ortega; Chile	María Paulina Vega; Chile	Esmerlyn Castro; Dominican Republic
Men's doubles	Ecuador; Alberto Miño; Emiliano Riofrio	Chile; Nicolas Burgos; Gustavo Gómez	Peru; Carlos Fernandez; Rodrigo Garcia
Men's doubles	Ecuador; Alberto Miño; Emiliano Riofrio	Chile; Nicolas Burgos; Gustavo Gómez	Colombia; Camilo Gonzalez; Santiago Montes
Women's doubles	Colombia; Manuela Echeverri; Cory Tellez	Dominican Republic; Esmerlyn Castro; Yasiris Ortiz	Ecuador; Nathaly Paredes; Astrid Salazar
Women's doubles	Colombia; Manuela Echeverri; Cory Tellez	Dominican Republic; Esmerlyn Castro; Yasiris Ortiz	Venezuela; Cristina Gomez; Camila Obando
Mixed doubles	Chile; Gustavo Gómez; Daniela Ortega	Chile; Nicolas Burgos; María Paulina Vega	Peru; Felipe Duffoo; Isabel Duffoo
Mixed doubles	Chile; Gustavo Gómez; Daniela Ortega	Chile; Nicolas Burgos; María Paulina Vega	Colombia; Manuela Echeverri; Julian Ramos
Men's team	Dominican Republic; Samuel Galvez; Jiaji Wu Zhang; Isaac Vila	Chile; Nicolas Burgos; Gustavo Gómez; Alfonso Olave	Peru; Felipe Duffoo; Carlos Fernandez; Rodrigo Garcia; Adrian Rubiños
Men's team	Dominican Republic; Samuel Galvez; Jiaji Wu Zhang; Isaac Vila	Chile; Nicolas Burgos; Gustavo Gómez; Alfonso Olave	Ecuador; Jorge Miño; Emiliano Riofrio; Rodrigo Tapia
Women's team	Chile; Judith Morales; Daniela Ortega; María Paulina Vega	Dominican Republic; Eva Brito; Esmerlyn Castro; Yasiris Ortiz	Colombia; Marta Casas; Manuela Echeverri; Juliana Lozada; Cory Tellez
Women's team	Chile; Judith Morales; Daniela Ortega; María Paulina Vega	Dominican Republic; Eva Brito; Esmerlyn Castro; Yasiris Ortiz	Venezuela; Isaleym Cardenas; Cristina Gomez; Roxi González; Camila Obando

=== Taekwondo ===
Event	Gold	Silver	Bronze
Men's individual poomsae	Hugo del Castillo; Peru	Isaac Velez; Colombia	Fernando Salgado; Ecuador
Women's individual poomsae	Laura Olarte; Colombia	Gabriela Castillo; Peru	Daniela Rodríguez; Panama
Pair poomsae	Colombia; Leandro Rodriguez; Dariana Suache	Peru; Carmela de la Barra; Luis Sacha	Dominican Republic; Sebastián Merán; Ana Patricia Peña
Team poomsae	Colombia; Juan Bustamante; Laura Olarte; Leandro Rodriguez; Dariana Suache; Isaac Velez	Ecuador; Andee Campos; Katlen Jerves; Fernando Salgado; Lissette Segura; Mario Troya	Peru; Carmela de la Barra; Gabriela Castillo; Hugo del Castillo; Caleb Pandal; Luis Sacha
Men's kyorugi 58 kg	Jefferson Ochoa; Colombia	Yohandry Granadp; Venezuela	Raymiguel Barreto; Peru
Men's kyorugi 58 kg	Jefferson Ochoa; Colombia	Yohandry Granadp; Venezuela	Yeuri Santos; Dominican Republic
Men's kyorugi 68 kg	David Paz; Colombia	Ignacio Morales; Chile	Jose Carlos Nieto; Ecuador
Men's kyorugi 68 kg	David Paz; Colombia	Ignacio Morales; Chile	Alexander Ruiz; Venezuela
Men's kyorugi 80 kg	Miguel Trejos; Colombia	Joaquin Churchill; Chile	Pedro Martinez; Dominican Republic
Men's kyorugi 80 kg	Miguel Trejos; Colombia	Joaquin Churchill; Chile	Franco Rios; Bolivia
Men's kyorugi +80 kg	Luis Alvarez; Venezuela	Luis Soto; Colombia	Julio Arroyo; Ecuador
Men's kyorugi +80 kg	Luis Alvarez; Venezuela	Luis Soto; Colombia	Guillermo Alba; Bolivia
Women's kyorugi 49 kg	Andrea Ramírez; Colombia	Virginia Dellan; Venezuela	Deisy Guelet; Chile
Women's kyorugi 49 kg	Andrea Ramírez; Colombia	Virginia Dellan; Venezuela	Karoline Castillo; Panama
Women's kyorugi 57 kg	Carolena Carstens; Panama	Fernanda Aguirre; Chile	Alba Gomez; Colombia
Women's kyorugi 57 kg	Carolena Carstens; Panama	Fernanda Aguirre; Chile	Genesis Gonzalez; Venezuela
Women's kyorugi 67 kg	Claudia Gallardo; Chile	Madelyn Rodríguez; Dominican Republic	Katherine Dumar; Colombia
Women's kyorugi 67 kg	Claudia Gallardo; Chile	Madelyn Rodríguez; Dominican Republic	Mell Mina; Ecuador
Women's kyorugi +67 kg	Gloria Mosquera; Colombia	Matvelin Espinoza; Ecuador	Marlin de la Cruz; Dominican Republic
Women's kyorugi +67 kg	Gloria Mosquera; Colombia	Matvelin Espinoza; Ecuador	Carolina Fernandez; Venezuela

=== Triathlon ===
Event	Gold	Silver	Bronze
Men's individual	Juan José Andrade; Ecuador	Cristóbal Baeza; Chile	Brian Moya; Colombia
Women's individual	Carolina Velásquez; Colombia	Josseline Yuqui; Ecuador	Diana Castillo; Colombia
Men's pair	Ecuador; Juan José Andrade; Ramon Matute	Colombia; Brian Moya; Esteban Tibocha	Venezuela; Yhousman Perdomo; Luis Velasquez
Women's pair	Colombia; Diana Castillo; Carolina Velásquez	Ecuador; Paula Vega; Josseline Yuqui	Chile; Catalina Salazar; Macarena Salazar
Mixed relay	Colombia; Diana Castillo; Brian Moya; Carlos Quinchara; Carolina Velásquez	Ecuador; Juan José Andrade; Elizabeth Bravo; Paula Jara; Ramon Matute	Chile; Cristóbal Baeza; Fernando Jacome; Catalina Salazar; Macarena Salazar

=== Water polo ===
Event	Gold	Silver	Bronze
Men	Colombia; Luis Aranda; Alejandro Arbelaez; Nelson Bejarano; Camilo Camacho; Juan Pablo Guapacha; Enzo Hernandez; Jairo Lizarazo; Andres Mora; Sebastian Muñoz; Manuel Quintero; Jose Manuel Rengifo; Carlos Sanchez; Stefano Talaga	Venezuela; Mikail de Bei; Jaime Blum; Axel Devonish; Douglas Espinoza; Antony Fernandez; Joaquin Lopez; Jesus Marquez; Antonio Medina; Alexander Morey; Jonathan Morillo; Jonder Perdomo; Kelvin Romero; Hugo Velazquez	Peru; Eduardo Alzamora; Ulises Angulo; Mauricio Bustamante; Diego Contreras; Nicolas Contreras; Eduardo Grandez; Yamil Leon; Jefferson Pinedo; Simon Regalado; Joaquin Robinson; German Rodriguez; Lorenzo Rodriguez; Alfredo Tassano
Women	Peru; Stefanny Alvarez; Alyssa Barnuvo; Diana Garnica; Anna López; Elisa López; Maria Fe Menacho; Miranda Nieto; Carolina Rodriguez; Rebeca Rodriguez; Areli Rolando; Abigail Sirio; Belen Torres; Daniela Torres	Venezuela; Jeisnaesmil Agelvis; Alexandra Carangelo; Aikel Dominguez; Franyelis Escalona; Beatriz Escobar; Zamely Fernandez; Oriana Gil; Dulce Hernandez; Ambar Inojosa; Jermany Silva; Samanta Torres; Osmary Toro; Maryori Villa	Colombia; Salome Agudelo; Eliana Cadavid; Maria Fernanda Delgado; Maria Jose Erazo; Liz Guerrero; Isabela Ochoa; Tamara Ochoa; Juanita Pacheco; Gabriela Quiroga; Juliana Ramos; Melanie Rojas; Paula Rozo; Daniela Vargas

=== Wrestling ===
Event	Gold	Silver	Bronze
Men's Greco-Roman 60 kg	Dicther Toro; Colombia	Joao Benavides; Peru	Raiber Rodríguez; Venezuela
Men's Greco-Roman 67 kg	Andrés Montaño; Ecuador	Neiser Marimon; Venezuela	Julián Horta; Colombia
Men's Greco-Roman 67 kg	Andrés Montaño; Ecuador	Neiser Marimon; Venezuela	Enyer Feliciano; Dominican Republic
Men's Greco-Roman 77 kg	Wuileixis Rivas; Venezuela	Luis Alfredo de León; Dominican Republic	Jose Mosquera; Colombia
Men's Greco-Roman 87 kg	Carlos Muñoz; Colombia	Luis Avendaño; Venezuela	Pool Ambrocio; Peru
Men's Greco-Roman 97 kg	Luillys Pérez; Venezuela	Carlos Adames; Dominican Republic	Haner Ramirez; Colombia
Men's Greco-Roman 130 g	Yasmani Acosta; Chile	José Daniel Díaz; Venezuela	Cristián Bravo; Colombia
Men's freestyle 57 kg	Óscar Tigreros; Colombia	Enrique Herrera; Peru	Juan Rubelín Ramírez; Dominican Republic
Men's freestyle 65 kg	Wilfredo Rodríguez; Venezuela	Mauricio Sánchez; Ecuador	Sixto Auccapiña; Peru
Men's freestyle 65 kg	Wilfredo Rodríguez; Venezuela	Mauricio Sánchez; Ecuador	Álbaro Rudesindo; Dominican Republic
Men's freestyle 74 kg	Anthony Montero; Venezuela	Andres Ramirez; Colombia	Angel Cortes; Panama
Men's freestyle 86 kg	Pedro Ceballos; Venezuela	Eduardo Gajardo; Chile	Jorge Andy; Ecuador
Men's freestyle 97 kg	Cristian Sarco; Venezuela	Luis Miguel Pérez; Dominican Republic	Miller Mondragon; Colombia
Women's freestyle 50 kg	Jacqueline Mollocana; Ecuador	Mariana Rojas; Venezuela	Thalía Mallqui; Peru
Women's freestyle 53 kg	Lucía Yépez; Ecuador	Betzabeth Argüello; Venezuela	Sandy Yalixa; Colombia
Women's freestyle 57 kg	Luisa Valverde; Ecuador	Tatiana Hurtado; Colombia	Antonia Valdes; Chile
Women's freestyle 62 kg	Nathaly Grimán; Venezuela	Leonela Ayoví; Ecuador	Katherine Rentería; Colombia
Women's freestyle 68 kg	Soleymi Caraballo; Venezuela	Yanet Sovero; Peru	Yessica Oviedo; Dominican Republic
Women's freestyle 76 kg	Tatiana Rentería; Colombia	Génesis Reasco; Ecuador	María Acosta; Venezuela
