= Bruna Wurts =

Brazilian artistic roller skater

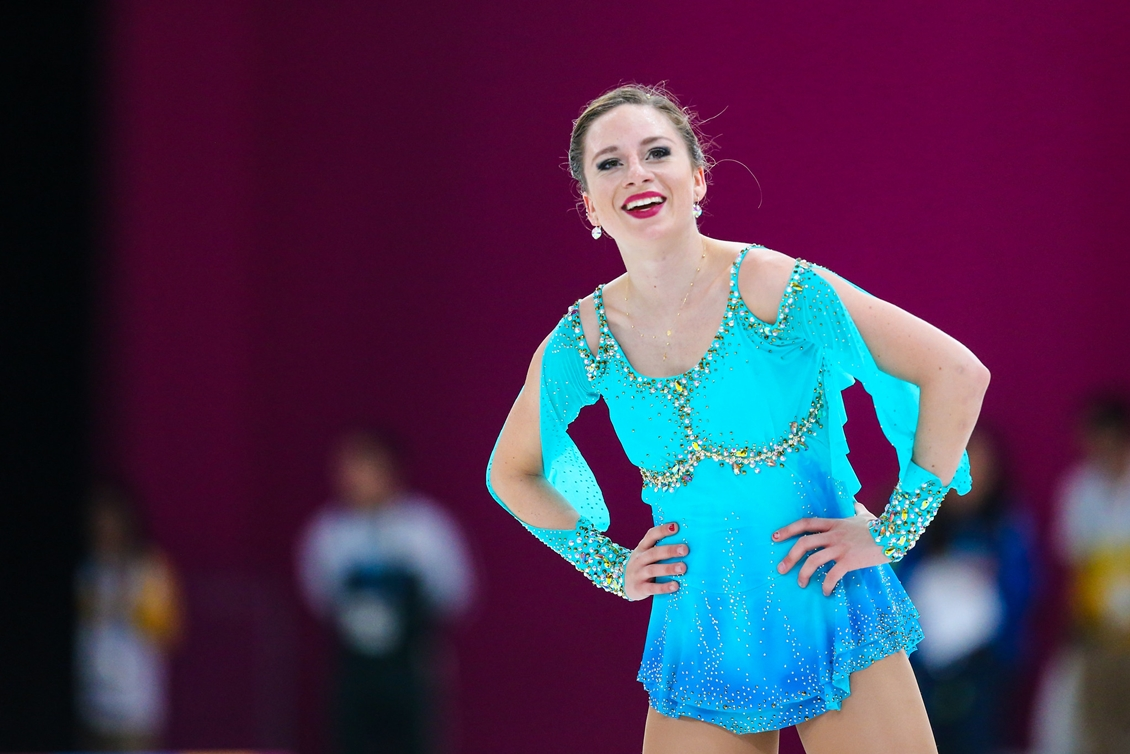
- Wurts at the 2019 Pan American Games

Personal information
- Nationality: Brazilian
- Born: 19 August 2000 (age 25)

Sport
- Sport: Roller skating
Medal record
Pan American Games
Gold medal – first place	2019 Lima	Free skating
South American Games
Gold medal – first place	2018 Cochabamba	Free skating

Bruna Wurts (born 19 August 2000) is a Brazilian artistic roller skater also married to professional footballer Tomáš Rigo.

Wurts competed at the 2018 South American Games, where she won a gold medal, and at the 2019 Pan American Games where she won a gold medal in the free skating event.
