= Mariana Rojas =

Venezuelan freestyle wrestler

Personal information
- Full name: Mariana Raimary Rojas Díaz
- Born: 28 April 2003 (age 23)

Sport
- Country: Venezuela
- Sport: Amateur wrestling
- Weight class: 50 kg; 53 kg
- Event: Freestyle
Medal record
Women's freestyle wrestling
Representing Venezuela
Pan American Games
Bronze medal – third place	2023 Santiago	50 kg
Pan American Championships
Silver medal – second place	2024 Acapulco	50 kg
Silver medal – second place	2025 Monterrey	53 kg
Central American and Caribbean Games
Bronze medal – third place	2023 San Salvador	50 kg
South American Games
Silver medal – second place	2022 Asunción	50 kg
Bolivarian Games
Silver medal – second place	2022 Valledupar	50 kg
Junior Pan American Games
Bronze medal – third place	2021 Cali-Valle	53 kg

Mariana Raimary Rojas Díaz (Note: In this Spanish name, the first or paternal surname is Rojas and the second or maternal family name is Díaz.) (born 28 April 2003) is a Venezuelan freestyle wrestler. She won the silver medal in the women's 50 kg event at the 2022 Bolivarian Games held in Valledupar, Colombia. She also won the silver medal in her event at the 2022 South American Games held in Asunción, Paraguay.

== Career ==
In 2021, Rojas won one of the bronze medals in the women's 53 kg event at the Junior Pan American Games held in Cali, Colombia.

Rojas competed in the women's 53 kg event at the 2022 U23 World Wrestling Championships held in Pontevedra, Spain. She won one of the bronze medals in the women's 50 kg event at the 2023 Pan American Games held in Santiago, Chile. She defeated Erin Golston of the United States in her bronze medal match.

Rojas won the silver medal in her event at the 2024 Pan American Wrestling Championships held in Acapulco, Mexico. She competed at the 2024 Pan American Wrestling Olympic Qualification Tournament held in Acapulco, Mexico hoping to qualify for the 2024 Summer Olympics in Paris, France. She was eliminated in her first match by Geneviève Morrison of Canada.

== Achievements ==
Year	Tournament	Location	Result	Event
2022	Bolivarian Games	Valledupar, Colombia	2nd	Freestyle 50 kg
2022	South American Games	Asunción, Paraguay	2nd	Freestyle 50 kg
2023	Central American and Caribbean Games	San Salvador, El Salvador	3rd	Freestyle 50 kg
2023	Pan American Games	Santiago, Chile	3rd	Freestyle 50 kg
2024	Pan American Wrestling Championships	Acapulco, Mexico	2nd	Freestyle 50 kg
2025	Pan American Wrestling Championships	Monterrey, Mexico	2nd	Freestyle 53 kg
