= Sofia Padilla =

Ecuadorian sports shooter

Personal information
- Born: 19 May 1989 (age 37) Guayaquil, Ecuador
- Height: 5 ft 2 in (1.57 m)
- Weight: 130 lb (59 kg)

Sport
- Sport: Sports shooting
- Coached by: Jose Padilla

Sofia Padilla (born 19 May 1989) is an Ecuadorian sports shooter. She competed in the Women's 10 metre air rifle event at the 2012 Summer Olympics.
