= Yusneylys Guzmán =

Cuban freestyle wrestler

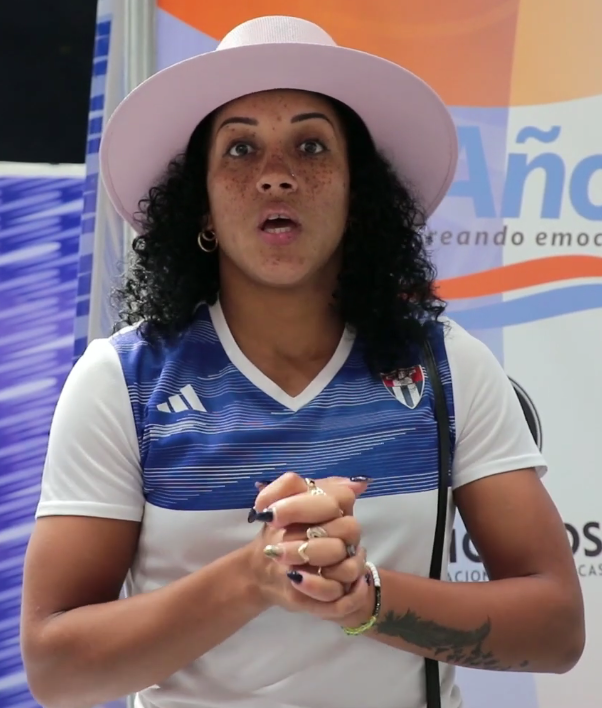
- Guzmán in 2025

Personal information
- Full name: Yusneylys Guzmán Lopez
- Born: 8 August 1996 (age 29) Havana, Cuba

Sport
- Country: Cuba
- Sport: Amateur wrestling
- Weight class: 50 kg
- Event: Freestyle
Medal record
Women's freestyle wrestling
Representing Cuba
Olympic Games
Silver medal – second place	2024 Paris	50 kg
Pan American Games
Gold medal – first place	2023 Santiago	50 kg
Silver medal – second place	2019 Lima	50 kg
Pan American Championships
Gold medal – first place	2019 Buenos Aires	50 kg
Bronze medal – third place	2023 Buenos Aires	50 kg
Bronze medal – third place	2025 Monterrey	50 kg
Central American and Caribbean Games
Gold medal – first place	2023 San Salvador	50 kg
Silver medal – second place	2014 Veracruz	48 kg
Bronze medal – third place	2018 Barranquilla	50 kg

Yusneylys Guzmán Lopez (Note: In this Spanish name, the first or paternal surname is Guzmán and the second or maternal family name is Lopez.) (born 8 August 1996) is a Cuban freestyle wrestler. She is a gold medalist at the Pan American Games and the Pan American Wrestling Championships. She is also a three-time medalist, including gold, at the Central American and Caribbean Games. Guzmán competed in the women's 50 kg event at the 2020 Summer Olympics held in Tokyo, Japan. Guzmán lost to Vinesh Phogat in semifinal but still qualified to the final round of women's 50 kg event at the 2024 Summer Olympics held in Paris, France as Vinesh Phogat, the original opponent of Sarah Hildebrandt was disqualified before the final game for being overweight by 100 grams. She lost to Hildebrandt, but would win the silver medal.

== Career ==
Guzmán competed at the Central American and Caribbean Games both in 2014 and in 2018: she won the silver medal in the women's 48 kg event in 2014 and she won one of the bronze medals in the 50 kg event in 2018.

In 2015, Guzmán represented Cuba at the Pan American Games held in Toronto, Canada in the 48 kg event without winning a medal. She lost her bronze medal match against Alyssa Lampe of the United States. The following year, she competed in the 2016 Pan American Wrestling Olympic Qualification Tournament without qualifying for the 2016 Summer Olympics in Rio de Janeiro, Brazil. In this competition, she also lost her bronze medal match against Alyssa Lampe.

In 2019, Guzmán won the gold medal in the 50 kg event at the Pan American Wrestling Championships held in Buenos Aires, Argentina. She won the silver medal in the 50 kg event at the 2019 Pan American Games held in Lima, Peru. In that same year, Guzmán also competed in the 50 kg event at the 2019 World Wrestling Championships where she was eliminated in her first match.

In March 2020, Guzmán qualified at the Pan American Olympic Qualification Tournament held in Ottawa, Canada to represent Cuba at the 2020 Summer Olympics. She competed in the women's 50 kg event at the 2020 Summer Olympics held in Tokyo, Japan. She lost her first match against eventual silver medalist Sun Yanan of China and she was then eliminated in the repechage by Oksana Livach of Ukraine.

Guzmán won one of the bronze medals in her event at the 2023 Pan American Wrestling Championships held in Buenos Aires, Argentina. A few months later, she won the gold medal in the women's 50 kg event at the 2023 Pan American Games held in Santiago, Chile. She defeated Jacqueline Mollocana of Ecuador in her gold medal match.

In 2024, at the Pan American Wrestling Olympic Qualification Tournament held in Acapulco, Mexico, she earned a quota place for Cuba for the 2024 Summer Olympics held in Paris, France. At the 2024 Olympics, Guzmàn lost in semifinal to Indian wrestler Vinesh Phogat by 5-0 but still qualified for the final match as finalist Phogat was disqualified for being overweight by 100 grams. In the final, she settled for the silver medal after losing to American wrestler Sarah Hildebrandt.

== Achievements ==
Year	Tournament	Location	Result	Event
2014	Central American and Caribbean Games	Veracruz, Mexico	2nd	Freestyle 48 kg
2018	Central American and Caribbean Games	Barranquilla, Colombia	3rd	Freestyle 50 kg
2019	Pan American Wrestling Championships	Buenos Aires, Argentina	1st	Freestyle 50 kg
2019	Pan American Games	Lima, Peru	2nd	Freestyle 50 kg
2023	Pan American Wrestling Championships	Buenos Aires, Argentina	3rd	Freestyle 50 kg
2023	Central American and Caribbean Games	San Salvador, El Salvador	1st	Freestyle 50 kg
2023	Pan American Games	Santiago, Chile	1st	Freestyle 50 kg
2024	Olympic Games	Paris, France	2nd	Freestyle 50 kg
2025	Pan American Wrestling Championships	Monterrey, Mexico	3rd	Freestyle 50 kg
