= 2019 Pan American Racquetball Championships =

The 2019 Pan American Racquetball Championships took place in Barranquilla, Colombia from April 12–20 at the Parque de Racquetas La Castellana, which was used for the 2018 Central American and Caribbean Games. Bolivia won both Men's Singles and Doubles for the 1st time in tournament history, while Mexico won both Women's Singles and Doubles for the 5th time.

Carlos Keller of Bolivia successfully defended the gold medal he won in 2018 by defeating the USA's Charlie Pratt in the Men's Singles final, and Keller's brother Roland won gold in Men's Doubles with Conrrado Moscoso, as they defeated Canadians Coby Iwaasa and Samuel Murray in the final. Roland Keller's gold was his 2nd in Men's Doubles at the Pan Am Championships, as he'd previously won gold with Ricardo Monroy in 2012.

Paola Longoria won Pan Am Championship gold in Women's Singles for a record extending 8th time in Barranquilla, where she defeated María José Vargas in the final. Longoria and Samantha Salas won Women's Doubles for a 6th time together. Their win over Colombians Cristina Amaya and Adriana Riveros in the final was the 6th consecutive title for Mexico. Mexico has won 9 of the last 10 Women's Doubles titles at the Pan Am Championships, and either Longoria or Salas (or both) has been part of the winning team.

== Tournament format ==
The competition had four events: Men's and Women's Singles and Doubles. Each event had a group stage followed by a medal round. The results of the group stage were used to seed players for the medal round. The group stage began April 13 and concluded April 15. The medal round began April 17.

== Participating nations ==
A total of 15 countries have entered athletes: 42 men and 32 women.

- Argentina (4)
- Bolivia (6)
- Canada (6)
- Chile (6)
- Colombia (5)
- Costa Rica (3)
- Cuba (4)
- Dominican Republic (4)
- Ecuador (6)
- Guatemala (5)
- Honduras (2)
- Mexico (7)
- Peru (3)
- Venezuela (6)
- United States (7)

== Medal summary ==
=== Medal table ===
Rank	Nation	Gold	Silver	Bronze	Total
1	Mexico (MEX)	2	0	2	4
2	Bolivia (BOL)	2	0	1	3
3	Argentina (ARG)	0	1	1	2
3	Canada (CAN)	0	1	1	2
5	Colombia (COL)	0	1	0	1
5	United States (USA)	0	1	0	1
7	Costa Rica (CRC)	0	0	2	2
8	Ecuador (ECU)	0	0	1	1
Totals (8 entries)		4	4	8	16

=== Medalists ===
Event	Gold	Silver	Bronze
Men's events
Singles	Carlos Keller; Bolivia	Charles Pratt; United States	Andrés Acuña; Costa Rica Álvaro Beltrán; Mexico
Doubles	Roland Keller; Conrrado Moscoso; Bolivia	Coby Iwaasa; Samuel Murray; Canada	Javier Mar; Rodrigo Montoya; Mexico Andrés Acuña; Felipe Camacho; Costa Rica
Women's events
Singles	Paola Longoria; Mexico	María José Vargas; Argentina	Maria Paz Muñoz; Ecuador Natalia Mendez; Argentina
Doubles	Paola Longoria; Samantha Salas; Mexico	Cristina Amaya; Adriana Riveros; Colombia	Valeria Centellas; Yazmine Sabja; Bolivia Danielle Drury; Jen Saunders; Canada

== Men's singles ==
=== Preliminary round ===
Group A

Players	Pld	W	L	GW	GL	PW	PL	Points
(Mexico) Alejandro Landa	2	2	0	4	0	60	17	4
(Guatemala) Edwin Galicia	2	1	1	2	2	42	52	3
(Chile) Johan Igor	2	0	2	0	4	27	60	2

Group B

Players	Pld	W	L	GW	GL	PW	PL	Points
(United States) David Horn	3	2	0	4	0	60	25	4
(Cuba) Mykel Mollet	3	1	1	2	3	49	54	3
(Colombia) Andrés Gómez	3	0	2	2	4	33	63	2

Group C

Players	Pld	W	L	GW	GL	PW	PL	Points
(Mexico) Álvaro Beltrán	3	3	0	6	1	98	60	6
(Guatemala) Juan Salvatierra	3	2	1	4	3	82	74	5
(Chile) Francisco Troncoso	3	1	2	4	4	97	84	4
(Peru) Sebastian Mendiguri	3	0	3	0	6	31	90	3

Group D

Players	Pld	W	L	GW	GL	PW	PL	Points
(United States) Charles Pratt	3	3	0	6	1	90	39	6
(Colombia) Mario Mercado	3	2	1	5	2	84	60	5
(Cuba) Enier Chacon	3	1	2	2	4	55	69	4
(Peru) Jonathan Luque	3	0	3	0	6	20	90	3

Group E

Players	Pld	W	L	GW	GL	PW	PL	Points
(Bolivia) Conrrado Moscoso	3	3	0	6	0	90	32	6
(Ecuador) Jose Daniel Ugalde	3	2	1	4	3	72	69	5
(Argentina) Shai Manzuri	3	1	2	3	4	72	66	4
(Honduras) Jesus Icaza	3	0	3	0	6	23	90	3

Group F

Players	Pld	W	L	GW	GL	PW	PL	Points
(Dominican Republic) Luis Pérez	3	2	1	5	4	113	89	5
(Canada) Samuel Murray	3	2	1	5	2	93	63	5
(Costa Rica) Felipe Camacho	3	1	2	3	4	72	76	4
(Venezuela) Roberto Leyes	3	1	2	0	6	12	90	4

Group G

Players	Pld	W	L	GW	GL	PW	PL	Points
(Bolivia) Carlos Keller	3	3	0	6	0	90	48	6
(Ecuador) Fernando Rios	3	2	1	4	3	88	63	5
(Argentina) Fernando Kurzbard	3	1	2	3	4	74	81	4
(Honduras) Carlos Medrano	3	0	3	0	6	30	90	3

Group H

Players	Pld	W	L	GW	GL	PW	PL	Points
(Costa Rica) Andrés Acuña	3	3	0	6	0	90	42	6
(Canada) Coby Iwaasa	3	2	1	4	2	75	63	5
(Dominican Republic) Ramón de León	3	1	2	2	4	59	72	4
(Venezuela) Felipe Luis Zea	3	0	3	0	6	43	90	3

=== Medal round ===
Round of 32
1	(Mexico) Alejandro Landa
32	BYE
17	(Chile) Francisco Troncoso	10, 8
16	(Cuba) Mykel Mollet	15, 15
9	(Ecuador) Fernando Rios	15, 15
24	(Costa Rica) Felipe Camacho	14, 12
25	(Honduras) Jesus Icaza	5, 3
8	(Costa Rica) Andrés Acuña	15, 15
5	(Bolivia) Conrrado Moscoso	15, 15
28	(Venezuela) Luis Felip Zea	10, 9
21	(Argentina) Fernando Kurzbard	0, 5
12	(Canada) Samuel Murray	15, 15
13	(Guatemala) Juan Salvatierra	15, 15
20	(Colombia) Andrés Gómez	14, 14
29	(Peru) Sebastian Mendiguri	2, 4
4	(United States) Charles Pratt	15, 15
3	(Mexico) Álvaro Beltrán	15, 15
30	(Peru) Jonathan Luque	0, 3
19	(Chile) Johan Igor	6, 6
14	(Colombia) Mario Mercado	15, 15
11	(Ecuador) Jose Daniel Ugalde	15, 15
22	(Dominican Republic) Ramón de León	11, 11
27	(Honduras) Carlos Medrano	2, 3
6	(Dominican Republic) Luis Pérez	15, 15
7	(Bolivia) Carlos Keller	15, 15
26	(Venezuela) Roberto Leyes	2, 6
23	(Argentina) Shai Manzuri	4, 8
10	(Canada) Coby Iwaasa	15, 15
15	(Guatemala) Edwin Galicia	15, 15
18	(Cuba) Enier Chacon	7, 1
31	BYE
2	(United States) David Horn

Round of 16
1	(Mexico) Alejandro Landa	15, 15
17	(Cuba) Mykel Mollet	9, 3
9	(Ecuador) Fernando Rios	14, 2
8	(Costa Rica) Andrés Acuña	15, 15
5	(Bolivia) Conrrado Moscoso	15, 15
12	(Canada) Samuel Murray	6, 6
13	(Guatemala) Juan Salvatierra	3, 6
4	(United States) Charles Pratt	15, 15
3	(Mexico) Álvaro Beltrán	12, 15, 11
14	(Colombia) Mario Mercado	15, 8, 1
11	(Ecuador) Jose Daniel Ugalde	7, 15, 1
6	(Dominican Republic) Luis Pérez	15, 13, 11
7	(Bolivia) Carlos Keller	15, 15
10	(Canada) Coby Iwaasa	10, 9
15	(Guatemala) Edwin Galicia	5, 7
2	(United States) David Horn	15, 15

Quarterfinals
1	(Mexico) Alejandro Landa	15, 14, 7
9	(Costa Rica) Andrés Acuña	6, 15, 11
5	(Bolivia) Conrrado Moscoso	15, 12, 10
4	(United States) Charles Pratt	3, 15, 11
3	(Mexico) Álvaro Beltrán	15, 15
6	(Dominican Republic) Luis Pérez	9, 6
7	(Bolivia) Carlos Keller	15, 15
2	(United States) David Horn	12, 10

Semi finals
8	(Costa Rica) Andrés Acuña	15, 11, 7
4	(United States) Charles Pratt	13, 15, 11
3	(Mexico) Álvaro Beltrán	13, 8
7	(Bolivia) Carlos Keller	15, 15

Finals
4	(United States) Charles Pratt	2, 15, 5
7	(Bolivia) Carlos Keller	15, 8, 11

== Men's doubles ==
Group A

Players	Pld	W	L	GW	GL	PW	PL	Points
(Mexico) Javier Mar / Rodrigo Montoya	2	2	0	4	0	60	41	4
(Dominican Republic) Ramón de León / Luis Pérez	2	1	1	2	2	49	53	3
(Guatemala) Edwin Galicia / Christian Wer	2	0	2	0	4	45	60	2

Group B

Players	Pld	W	L	GW	GL	PW	PL	Points
(United States) Jake Bredenbeck / Mauro Rojas	3	3	0	6	0	90	34	6
(Colombia) Andrés Gómez / Mario Mercado	3	2	1	4	2	75	53	5
(Argentina) Fernando Kurzbard / Shai Manzuri	3	1	2	2	4	71	66	4
(Peru) Sebastian Mendiguri / Óscar Navarro	3	0	3	0	6	7	90	3

Group C

Players	Pld	W	L	GW	GL	PW	PL	Points
(Costa Rica) Andrés Acuña / Felipe Camacho	3	2	1	5	4	108	85	5
(Cuba) Enier Chacon / Mykel Mollet	3	2	1	5	4	93	77	5
(Ecuador) Juan Francisco Cueva / Jose Daniel Ugalde	3	2	1	4	3	91	86	5
(Chile) Rafael Gatica / Francisco Troncoso	3	0	3	1	6	52	96	3

Group D

Players	Pld	W	L	GW	GL	PW	PL	Points
(Bolivia) Roland Keller / Conrrado Moscoso	3	3	0	6	1	99	62	6
(Canada) Coby Iwaasa / Samuel Murray	3	2	1	5	2	97	54	5
(Venezuela) Gregorio Machado / Luis Reveron	3	1	2	2	5	57	90	4
(Honduras) Jesus Icaza / Carlos Medrano	3	0	3	1	6	46	93	3

=== Medal Round ===
First Round
9	(Venezuela) Gregorio Machado (Venezuela) Luis Reveron	14	1
8	(Ecuador) Juan Francisco Cueva (Ecuador) Juan Daniel Ugalde	15	15
5	(Colombia) Andrés Gómez (Colombia) Mario Mercado	15	15
12	(Guatemala) Edwin Galicia (Guatemala) Christian Wer	9	6
13	(Chile) Rafael Gatica (Chile) Francisco Troncoso	1	6
4	(Bolivia) Roland Keller (Bolivia) Conrrado Moscoso	15	15
3	(Costa Rica) Andrés Acuña (Costa Rica) Felipe Camacho	15	15
4	(Honduras) Jesus Icaza (Honduras) Carlos Medrano	4	2
11	(Argentina) Fernando Kurzbard (Argentina) Shai Manzuri	12	15	11
6	(Dominican Republic) Ramón de León (Dominican Republic) Luis Pérez	15	8	5
7	(Canada) Coby Iwaasa (Canada) Samuel Murray	15	15
10	(Cuba) Enier Chacon (Cuba) Maykel Moyet	11	4
15	(Peru) Sebastian Mendiguri (Peru) Óscar Navarro	0	0
2	(United States) Jake Bredenbeck (United States) Mauro Rojas	15	15

Quarterfinals
1	(Mexico) Javier Mar (Mexico) Rodrigo Montoya	15	15
8	(Ecuador) Juan Francisco Cueva (Ecuador) Juan Daniel Ugalde	2	6
5	(Colombia) Andrés Gómez (Colombia) Mario Mercado	3	5
4	(Bolivia) Roland Keller (Bolivia) Conrrado Moscoso	15	15
3	(Costa Rica) Andrés Acuña (Costa Rica) Felipe Camacho	15	12	11
11	(Argentina) Fernando Kurzbard (Argentina) Shai Manzuri	5	15	1
7	(Canada) Coby Iwaasa (Canada) Samuel Murray	13	15	11
2	(United States) Jake Bredenbeck (United States) Mauro Rojas	15	1	7

Semifinals
1	(Mexico) Javier Mar (Mexico) Rodrigo Montoya	15	11	7
4	(Bolivia) Roland Keller (Bolivia) Conrrado Moscoso	14	15	11
3	(Costa Rica) Andrés Acuña (Costa Rica) Felipe Camacho	15	1	3
7	(Canada) Coby Iwaasa (Canada) Samuel Murray	8	15	11

Final
4	(Bolivia) Roland Keller (Bolivia) Conrrado Moscoso	2	15	11
7	(Canada) Coby Iwaasa (Canada) Samuel Murray	15	9	2

== Women's singles ==
=== Preliminary round ===
Group A

Players	Pld	W	L	GW	GL	PW	PL	Points
(Mexico) Montserrat Mejia	2	2	0	4	1	67	47	4
(Colombia) Adriana Riveros	2	1	1	2	2	49	53	3
(Ecuador) Maria Paz Muñoz	2	0	2	1	4	51	60	2

Group B

Players	Pld	W	L	GW	GL	PW	PL	Points
(Colombia) Cristina Amaya	2	2	0	4	1	70	48	4
(United States) Rhonda Rajsich	2	1	1	3	2	67	56	3
(Ecuador) Maria Jose Muñoz	2	0	2	0	4	27	60	2

Group C

Players	Pld	W	L	GW	GL	PW	PL	Points
(Mexico) Paola Longoria	2	2	0	4	0	60	28	4
(Argentina) María José Vargas	2	1	1	2	2	55	39	3
(Venezuela) Lilian Zea	2	0	2	0	4	12	60	2

Group D

Players	Pld	W	L	GW	GL	PW	PL	Points
(Chile) Carla Muñoz	3	3	0	6	1	91	48	6
(United States) Kelani Bailey Lawrence	3	2	1	5	2	84	49	5
(Cuba) Yurisleidis Alluie	3	1	2	2	5	72	95	4
(Canada) Erin Geeraert	3	0	3	1	6	42	97	3

Group E

Players	Pld	W	L	GW	GL	PW	PL	Points
(Guatemala) Maria Renee Rodriguez	3	3	0	6	0	90	53	6
(Venezuela) Mariana Tobon	3	2	1	4	2	76	56	5
(Dominican Republic) Alejandra Jimenez	3	1	2	2	4	65	60	4
(Argentina) Natalia Mendez	3	0	3	0	6	42	90	2

Group F

Players	Pld	W	L	GW	GL	PW	PL	Points
(Bolivia) Valeria Centellas	3	3	0	6	0	90	22	6
(Cuba) María Regla Viera	3	2	1	4	3	77	69	5
(Canada) Michèle Morissette	3	1	2	3	4	76	71	4
(Chile) Josefina Toro	3	0	3	0	6	9	90	3

Group G

Players	Pld	W	L	GW	GL	PW	PL	Points
(Bolivia) Angélica Barrios	3	2	0	6	1	94	64	6
(Dominican Republic) Merynanyelly Delgado	3	2	1	5	3	100	70	5
(Costa Rica) Maricruz Ortiz	3	1	2	3	4	77	68	4
(Guatemala) Marie Gomar	3	0	3	0	6	21	90	3

=== Medal round ===
Round of 32
1	(Mexico) Montserrat Mejia
32	BYE
17	(Chile) Lilian Zea	14, 1
16	(Ecuador) Maria Jose Muñoz	15, 15
9	(Cuba) Maria Regla Viera	5, 2
24	(Argentina) Natalia Mendez	15, 15
25	(Canada) Erin Geeraert	4, 4
8	(Bolivia) Angélica Barrios	15, 15
5	(Guatemala) Maria Renee Rodriguez
BYE
21	(Costa Rica) Maricruz Ortiz	5, 9
12	(Argentina) María José Vargas	15, 15
13	(United States) Rhonda Rajsich	15, 15
20	(Canada) Michele Morissette	11, 9
BYE
4	(Chile) Carla Muñoz
3	(Mexico) Paola Longoria
BYE
19	(Dominican Republic) Alejandra Jimenez	6, 4
14	(Colombia) Adriana Riveros	15, 15
11	(United States) Kelani Bailey Lawrence	15, 15
22	(Guatemala) Marie Gomar	7, 2
BYE
6	(Bolivia) Valeria Centellas
7	(Dominican Republic) Merynanyelly Delgado
BYE
23	(Chile) Josefina Toro	2, 4
10	(Venezuela) Mariana Tobon	15, 15
15	(Ecuador) Maria Paz Muñoz	15, 15
18	(Cuba) Yurisleidis Alluie	4, 2
31	BYE
2	(Colombia) Cristina Amaya

Round of 16
1	(Mexico) Montserrat Mejia
16	(Ecuador) Maria Jose Muñoz	9, 4
24	(Argentina) Natalia Mendez	15, 15
8	(Bolivia) Angélica Barrios	3, 11
5	(Guatemala) Maria Renee Rodriguez	2, 0
12	(Argentina) María José Vargas	15, 15
13	(United States) Rhonda Rajsich	15, 15
4	(Chile) Carla Muñoz	10, 14
3	(Mexico) Paola Longoria	15, 15
14	(Colombia) Adriana Riveros	2, 7
11	(United States) Kelani Bailey Lawrence	7, 8
6	(Bolivia) Valeria Centellas	15, 15
7	(Dominican Republic) Merynanyelly Delgado	12, 15, 11
10	(Venezuela) Marian Tobon	15, 12, 0
15	(Ecuador) Maria Paz Muñoz	9, 15, 11
2	(Colombia) Cristina Amaya	15, 7, 8

Quarterfinals
1	(Mexico) Montserrat Mejia	13, 13
24	(Argentina) Natalia Mendez	15, 15
12	(Argentina) María José Vargas	15, 15
13	(United States) Rhonda Rajsich	4, 8
3	(Mexico) Paola Longoria	14, 15, 11
6	(Bolivia) Valeria Centellas	15, 4, 7
7	(Dominican Republic) Merynanyelly Delgado	15, 13, 3
15	(Ecuador) Maria Paz Muñoz	14, 15, 11

Semi finals
24	(Argentina) Natalia Mendez	9, 15, 7
12	(Argentina) María José Vargas	15, 14, 11
3	(Mexico) Paola Longoria	15, 15
15	(Ecuador) Maria Paz Muñoz	5, 3

Finals
12	(Argentina) María José Vargas	7, 2
3	(Mexico) Paola Longoria	15, 15

== Women's doubles ==
=== Preliminary round ===
Group A

Players	Pld	W	L	GW	GL	PW	PL	Points
(Mexico) Paola Longoria / Samantha Salas	2	2	0	4	0	60	22	4
(Cuba) Yurisleidis Alluie / Maria Regla Viera	2	1	1	2	3	51	63	3
(Canada) Danielle Drury / Jennifer Saunders	2	0	2	1	4	41	67	2

Group B

Players	Pld	W	L	GW	GL	PW	PL	Points
(Colombia) Cristina Amaya / Adriana Riveros	2	2	0	4	1	68	40	4
(Argentina) Natalia Méndez / María José Vargas	2	1	1	3	2	54	56	3
(United States) Kelani Bailey Lawrence / Sheryl Lotts	2	0	2	0	4	34	60	2

Group C

Players	Pld	W	L	GW	GL	PW	PL	Points
(Ecuador) Maria Jose Muñoz / Ana Lucia Sarmiento	2	2	0	4	0	60	36	4
(Dominican Republic) Merynanyelly Delgado / Alejandra Jimenez	2	1	1	2	2	43	52	3
(Chile) Carla Muñoz / Josefa Parada	2	0	2	0	4	45	60	2

Group D

Players	Pld	W	L	GW	GL	PW	PL	Points
(Bolivia) Valeria Centella / Yazmine Sabja	2	2	0	4	0	60	20	4
(Guatemala) Marie Gomar / María Renee Rodriguez	2	1	1	2	3	52	67	3
(Venezuela) Mariana Tobon / Lilian Zea	2	0	2	1	4	43	68	2

=== Medal round ===
First Round
9	(Chile) Carla Muñoz (Chile) Josefa Parada	7	8
8	(Argentina) Natalia Mendez (Argentina) María José Vargas	15	15
5	(Dominican Republic) Merynanyelly Delgado (Dominican Republic) Alejandra Jimenez	8	15	5
12	(United States) Kelani Bailey Lawrence (United States) Sheryl Lotts	15	11	11
11	(Canada) Danielle Drury (Canada) Jennifer Saunders	6	15	11
6	(Guatemala) Marie Gomar (Guatemala) Maria Renee Rodriguez	15	9	4
7	(Cuba) Yurisleidis Alluie (Cuba) Maria Regla Viera	15	15
10	(Venezuela) Mariana Tobon (Venezuela) Lilian Zea	7	3

Quarterfinals
1	(Mexico) Paola Longoria (Mexico) Samantha Salas	15	15
(Argentina) Natalia Mendez (Argentina) María José Vargas	7	6
(United States) Kelani Bailey Lawrence (United States) Sheryl Lotts	2	5
4	(Bolivia) Valeria Centellas (Bolivia) Yazmine Sabja	15	15
3	(Ecuador) Maria Paz Muñoz (Ecuador) Ana Lucia Sarmiento	15	9	8
(Canada) Danielle Drury (Canada) Jennifer Saunders	8	15	11
(Cuba) Yurisleidis Alluie (Cuba) Maria Regla Viera	3	4
2	(Colombia) Cristina Amaya (Colombia) Adriana Riveros	15	15

Semifinals
(Mexico) Paola Longoria (Mexico) Samantha Salas	15	15
(Bolivia) Valeria Centellas (Bolivia) Yazmine Sabja	2	6
(Canada) Danielle Drury (Canada) Jennifer Saunders	15	3	8
(Colombia) Cristina Amaya (Colombia) Adriana Riveros	13	15	11

Final
(Mexico) Paola Longoria (Mexico) Samantha Salas	15	15
(Colombia) Cristina Amaya (Colombia) Adriana Riveros	8	6
