= Andrés Montaño (wrestler) =

Ecuadorian Greco-Roman wrestler (born 1990)

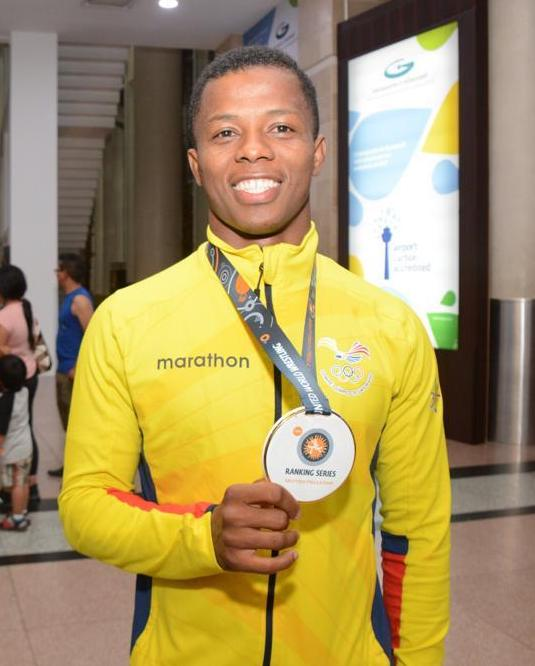
- Montaño in 2020

Personal information
- Full name: Andrés Roberto Montaño Arroyo
- Born: 6 April 1990 (age 36) Esmeraldas, Ecuador
- Height: 166 cm (5 ft 5 in)
- Weight: 59 kg (130 lb)
Medal record
Men's Greco-Roman wrestling
Representing Ecuador
Pan American Games
Gold medal – first place	2015 Toronto	59 kg
Gold medal – first place	2019 Lima	60 kg
Bronze medal – third place	2023 Santiago	67 kg
Bolivarian Games
Gold medal – first place	2022 Valledupar	67 kg
Pan American Championships
Gold medal – first place	2021 Guatemala City	63 kg
Silver medal – second place	2024 Acapulco	67 kg
Bronze medal – third place	2023 Buenos Aires	67 kg

Andrés Roberto Montaño Arroyo (Note: In this Spanish name, the first or paternal surname is Montaño and the second or maternal family name is Arroyo.) (born 6 April 1990) is an Ecuadorian Greco-Roman wrestler. He competed in the men's Greco-Roman 59 kg event at the 2016 Summer Olympics, in which he was eliminated in the round of 16 by Wang Lumin.

Montaño won the gold medal in his event at the 2022 Bolivarian Games held in Valledupar, Colombia.

Montaño won the silver medal in his event at the 2024 Pan American Wrestling Championships held in Acapulco, Mexico. A few days later, at the Pan American Wrestling Olympic Qualification Tournament held in Acapulco, Mexico, he earned a quota place for Ecuador for the 2024 Summer Olympics held in Paris, France. He competed in the 67 kg event at the Olympics.
