= Carla Pérez =

Ecuadorian mountaineer

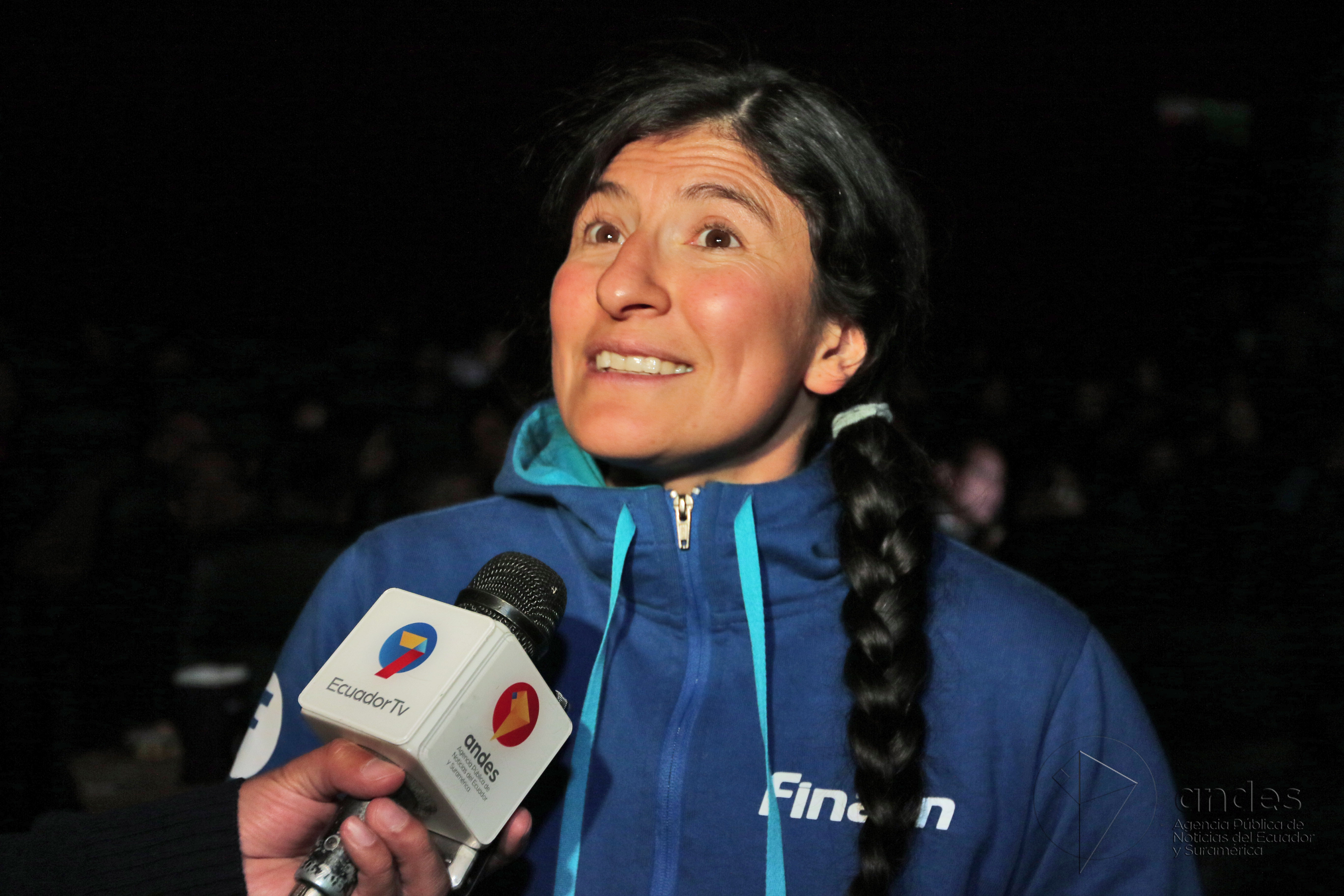
- Carla Pérez in 2017

Personal information
- Nationality: Ecuadorian
- Born: 28 December 1982 (age 43)

Climbing career
- Type of climber: Alpine climbing; Mountaineering
- Known for: First woman to successfully summit both Everest and K2 in the same year (2019)

Carla Pérez (born 28 December 1982) is an Ecuadorian climber. In 2019 she became the first woman to successfully summit both Everest and K2 in the same year (in 1995 Alison Hargreaves reached both summits unsupported and without supplemental oxygen but died descending K2), and the first woman from the Americas to summit K2 without supplemental oxygen.

== Early life ==
When Pérez was four years old her father took her to a 14,000-foot volcano near their home at Quito, Ecuador, which inspired her to become a mountain climber.

== Notable climbs ==
=== Manaslu ===
In 2012, Pérez reached the summit of Manaslu without supplemental oxygen.

=== Cho Oyu ===
In 2014, Pérez completed a solo ascent of Cho Oyu without supplemental oxygen.

=== Broad Peak ===
In 2015, Pérez reached the summit of Broad Peak without supplemental oxygen.

=== Mount Everest ===
Pérez has spent time on Mount Everest as both a mountain guide and a climber. In 2016, she became the first woman from Latin America to reach the summit without supplemental oxygen. In 2019, she successfully guided clients to the summit via the northeast ridge.

=== K2 ===
In 2019, Pérez became the first woman from the Americas to reach the summit of K2 without supplemental oxygen. In so doing, she became the second woman to reach the summit of Mount Everest and K2 in the same year. Alison Hargreaves being the first, in 1995 who climbed unsupported and without supplemental oxygen but died in a storm during descent.

=== Dhaulagiri ===
In 2021, Pérez climbed on Dhaulagiri but was not able to reach the summit.

=== Makalu ===
In 2022, Pérez reached the summit of Makalu without supplemental oxygen.
