= Thalía Mallqui =

Peruvian freestyle wrestler

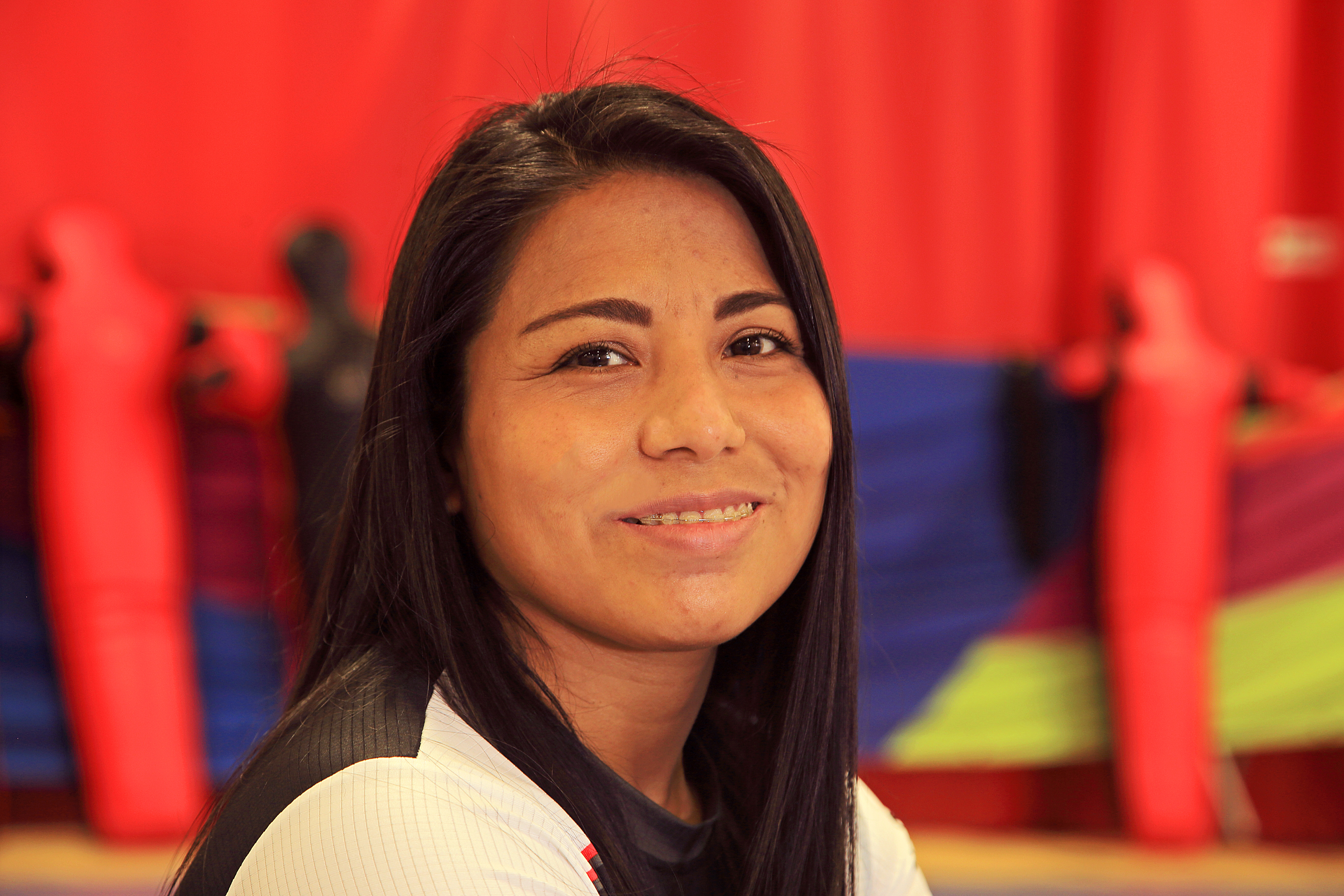
- Mallqui in 2019

Personal information
- Full name: Thalía Jihann Mallquí Peche
- Born: 11 May 1987 (age 39)

Sport
- Country: Peru
- Sport: Amateur wrestling
- Event: Freestyle
Medal record
Women's freestyle wrestling
Representing Peru
Pan American Games
Silver medal – second place	2015 Toronto	48 kg
Bronze medal – third place	2019 Lima	50 kg
South American Games
Silver medal – second place	2018 Cochabamba	50 kg
Silver medal – second place	2022 Asunción	53 kg
Bolivarian Games
Gold medal – first place	2017 Santa Marta	48 kg
Silver medal – second place	2013 Trujillo	48 kg
Bronze medal – third place	2022 Valledupar	50 kg
Pan American Championships
Silver medal – second place	2017 Lauro de Freitas	48 kg
Bronze medal – third place	2014 Mexico City	48 kg
Bronze medal – third place	2019 Buenos Aires	50 kg

Thalía Jihann Mallquí Peche (Note: In this Spanish name, the first or paternal surname is Mallquí and the second or maternal family name is Peche.) (born 11 May 1987) is a Peruvian freestyle wrestler. She is a two-time medalist at the Pan American Games.

Mallqui won one of the bronze medals in the women's 48 kg event at the 2014 Pan American Wrestling Championships held in Mexico City, Mexico.

Mallqui won the silver medal in the 48 kg event at the 2015 Pan American Games held in Toronto, Canada. Four years later, in 2019, she won one of the bronze medals in the 50 kg event at the Pan American Games held in Lima, Peru.

At the 2017 Pan American Wrestling Championships held in Lauro de Freitas, Brazil, she won the silver medal in the 48 kg event.

In March 2020, Mallqui competed at the Pan American Olympic Qualification Tournament held in Ottawa, Canada hoping to qualify for the 2020 Summer Olympics in Tokyo, Japan. She finished in 3rd place. She also failed to qualify for the Olympics at the World Olympic Qualification Tournament held in Sofia, Bulgaria.

Mallqui won the bronze medal in her event at the 2022 Bolivarian Games held in Valledupar, Colombia. She won the silver medal in her event at the 2022 South American Games held in Asunción, Paraguay.

Mallqui lost her bronze medal match in her event at the 2023 Pan American Wrestling Championships held in Buenos Aires, Argentina. A few months later, she also lost her bronze medal match in the women's 53 kg event at the 2023 Pan American Games held in Santiago, Chile.
