= Walter Rojas =

Argentine footballer

Personal information
- Full name: Walter Gabriel Rojas
- Date of birth: 15 January 1971 (age 55)
- Place of birth: Argentina
- Positions: Midfielder; winger

Senior career*
Years	Team	Apps	(Gls)
-1991	San Lorenzo de Almagro		(0)
1991	Dundee United F.C.	0	(0)
1991-1992	San Lorenzo de Almagro		(0)
1993-1994	Deportivo Armenio		
1996-1999	Talleres de Remedios de Escalada	71	(9)
2000	Huracán Buceo	2	(0)
2001	Deportivo Laferrere	1	(0)
- * Club domestic league appearances and goals

Walter Rojas (born 15 January 1971 in Argentina) is an Argentinean retired footballer.
