= Triathlon at the Pan American Games =

- No. of events: 3 (men: 1; women: 1; mixed: 1)

Triathlon has been a sport of the Pan American Games since the 1995 games in Mar del Plata, Argentina.

In 1993 the then Pan American Sports Organization added the sport to the sports program.

== Men's individual ==
Event	Gold	Silver	Bronze
1995	Leandro Macedo; Brazil	Mark Bates; Canada	Oscar Galíndez; Argentina
1999	Gilberto González; Venezuela	Hunter Kemper; United States	Simon Whitfield; Canada
2003	Hunter Kemper; United States	Virgilio de Castilho; Brazil	Oscar Galíndez; Argentina
2007	Andy Potts; United States	Brent McMahon; Canada	Juraci Moreira; Brazil
2011	Reinaldo Colucci; Brazil	Manuel Huerta; United States	Brent McMahon; Canada
2015	Crisanto Grajales; Mexico	Kevin McDowell; United States	Irving Pérez; Mexico
2019	Crisanto Grajales; Mexico	Manoel Messias; Brazil	Luciano Taccone; Argentina
2023	Miguel Hidalgo; Brazil	Matthew McElroy; United States	Crisanto Grajales; Mexico

== Women's individual ==
Event	Gold	Silver	Bronze
1995	Karen Smyers; United States	Kristie Otto; Canada	Fiona Cribb; Canada
1999	Sharon Donnelly; Canada	Carla Moreno; Brazil	Carol Montgomery; Canada
2003	Jill Savege; Canada	Sheila Taormina; United States	Becky Gibbs; United States
2007	Julie Ertel; United States	Sarah Haskins; United States	Lauren Groves; Canada
2011	Sarah Haskins; United States	Bárbara Riveros Díaz; Chile	Pâmella Oliveira; Brazil
2015	Bárbara Riveros Díaz; Chile	Paola Díaz; Mexico	Flora Duffy; Bermuda
2019	Luisa Baptista; Brazil	Vittória Lopes; Brazil	Cecilia Pérez Flores; Mexico
2023	Lizeth Rueda; Mexico	Carolina Velásquez; Colombia	Rosa Tapia; Mexico

== Mixed relay ==
Event	Gold	Silver	Bronze
2019	Brazil; Luisa Baptista; Kauê Willy; Vittória Lopes; Manoel Messias	Canada; Desirae Ridenour; Charles Paquet; Hannah Rose; Alexis Lepage	Mexico; Cecilia Pérez Flores; Irving Pérez; Claudia Rivas; Crisanto Grajales
2023	Brazil; Miguel Hidalgo; Djenyfer Arnold; Manoel Messias; Vittória Lopes	United States; Seth Rider; Erika Ackerlund; Matthew McElroy; Virginia Sereno	Canada; Brock Hoel; Emy Legault; Liam Donnelly; Dominika Jamnicky

== Medal table ==
Updated after the 2023 Pan American Games.

Rank	Nation	Gold	Silver	Bronze	Total
1	United States	6	7	2	15
2	Brazil	6	4	2	12
3	Mexico	4	1	6	11
4	Canada	2	5	6	13
5	Chile	1	1	0	2
6	Venezuela	1	0	0	1
7	Argentina	0	1	3	4
8	Colombia	0	1	0	1
9	Bermuda	0	0	1	1
Totals (9 entries)		20	20	20	60

== Nations ==
The following nations have taken part in the triathlon competition.

Nation	95	99	03	07	11	15	19	23	Total
Argentina	6	6	6	6	5	6	6	4	8
Aruba	-	-	-	-	-	1	-	-	1
Barbados	1	-	-	-	1	1	2	1	5
Belize	-	-	-	-	-	1	1	-	2
Bermuda	-	-	-	1	2	1	3	2	5
Bolivia	-	1	1	2	1	1	1	1	7
Brazil	6	5	6	6	6	6	6	7	8
Canada	6	5	6	6	3	6	6	6	8
Cayman Islands	1	-	-	-	-	-	-	-	1
Chile	6	1	3	3	6	6	4	4	8
Colombia	5	2	3	4	4	1	4	4	8
Costa Rica	4	3	5	4	3	2	2	3	8
Cuba	-	4	3	6	3	4	4	4	7
Dominican Republic	-	-	4	3	-	1	1	2	5
Ecuador	-	-	3	2	4	6	4	6	6
El Salvador	-	-	-	1	1	-	1	-	3
Grenada	-	-	-	1	-	-	-	-	1
Guatemala	3	-	1	1	3	3	3	4	7
Honduras	3	-	-	-	-	-	-	-	1
Jamaica	-	1	-	-	-	-	1	-	2
Mexico	6	4	5	6	6	6	6	7	8
Netherlands Antilles	-	1	-	-					1
Nicaragua	-	-	-	-	1	1	-	-	2
Panama	-	-	-	-	1	1	2	1	4
Paraguay	-	-	1	-	1	1	-	-	3
Peru	-	-	1	-	-	3	4	-	3
Puerto Rico	1	-	-	2	3	3	1	2	6
Suriname	-	-	1	-	-	-	-	-	1
United States	6	6	6	6	6	6	6	6	8
Uruguay	-	-	1	2	2	1	-	2	5
Venezuela	-	1	3	4	4	2	1	4	7
Virgin Islands	1	-	-	-	1	-	1	-	3
Total NOCs	14	13	18	20	22	24	23	19	32
