= Triathlon at the 2019 Pan American Games – Women's =

Triathlon – Women's individual at the 2019 Pan American Games
- Venue: Agua Dulce
- Dates: July 27
- Competitors: 29 from 15 nations
- Winning time: 2:00:55

Medalists
Gold medal	Luisa Baptista	Brazil
Silver medal	Vittoria Lopes	Brazil
Bronze medal	Cecilia Pérez	Mexico

The women's individual competition of the triathlon events at the 2019 Pan American Games was held on July 27 at the Agua Dulce in Lima, Peru. The defending Pan American Games champion is Bárbara Riveros of Chile.

The Pan American Games triathlon contains three components; a 1.5 km (0.93 mi) swim, 40 km (25 mi) cycle, and a 8.88 km (5.52 mi) run.

== Schedule ==
All times are Peru Time (UTC-5).

Date	Time	Round
July 27, 2019	10:00	Final

== Results ==
29 competitors from 15 countries were scheduled to compete.

Rank	Triathlete	Nation	Time	Diff
1st place, gold medalist(s)	Luisa Baptista	Brazil	2:00:55	
2nd place, silver medalist(s)	Vittória Lopes	Brazil	2:01:27	+0:33
3rd place, bronze medalist(s)	Cecilia Pérez	Mexico	2:02:07	+1:13
4	Sophie Chase	United States	2:02:28	+1:34
5	Bárbara Riveros	Chile	2:02:42	+1:48
6	Lina Raga	Colombia	2:02:58	+2:04
7	Leslie Amat Alvarez	Cuba	2:03:19	+2:25
8	Claudia Rivas	Mexico	2:03:22	+2:28
9	Romina Biagioli	Argentina	2:03:58	+3:04
10	Elizabeth Bravo	Ecuador	2:03:59	+3:05
11	Beatriz Neres	Brazil	2:04:49	+3:55
12	Jessica Romero Tinoco	Mexico	2:06:08	+5:13
13	Karol-Ann Roy	Canada	2:06:20	+5:26
14	Avery Evenson	United States	2:08:20	+7:26
15	Macarena Salazar	Chile	2:08:38	+7:44
16	Mary Alex England	United States	2:10:12	+9:18
17	Paula Jara	Ecuador	2:12:12	+11:18
18	Delfina Alvarez	Argentina	2:12:14	+11:20
19	Raquel Solis	Costa Rica	2:14:51	+13:57
20	Ada Bravo	Peru	2:15:04	+14:10
21	Erica Hawley	Bermuda	2:15:44	+14:50
22	Daniela Ciara	Cuba	2:17:04	+16:10
23	Génesis Ruiz	Venezuela	2:18:21	+17:26
24	Barbara Daniela Schoenfeld	Guatemala	2:20:29	+19:35
25	Barbara Marleny Schoenfeld	Guatemala	2:20:41	+19:47
26	Catalina Salazar	Chile	2:23:16	+22:22
	Blanca Kometter	Peru	DNF	
	Camila Romero	Dominican Republic	DNF	
	Diana Castillo	Colombia	DNF	
