= Mexico at the 2020 Summer Olympics =

- IOC code: MEX
- NOC: Mexican Olympic Committee
- Website: soycom.org (in Spanish)

in Tokyo, Japan 23 July 2021 – 8 August 2021
- Competitors: 162 (97 men & 65 women) in 27 sports
- Flag bearers (opening): Gabriela López; Rommel Pacheco
- Flag bearer (closing): Mayan Oliver
- Medals Ranked 84th: Gold 0 Silver 0 Bronze 4 Total 4

Summer Olympics appearances (overview)
- 1900; 1904–1920; 1924; 1928; 1932; 1936; 1948; 1952; 1956; 1960; 1964; 1968; 1972; 1976; 1980; 1984; 1988; 1992; 1996; 2000; 2004; 2008; 2012; 2016; 2020; 2024; 2028

Mexico competed at the 2020 Summer Olympics in Tokyo. Originally scheduled to take place from 24 July to 9 August 2020, the Games were postponed to 23 July to 8 August 2021, because of the COVID-19 pandemic. It was the nation's twenty-fourth appearance at the Summer Olympics. Athletes were given priority for vaccines in March.

== Medalists ==
Medal	Name	Sport	Event	Date
Bronze	Luis Álvarez; Alejandra Valencia	Archery	Mixed team	24 July
Bronze	Gabriela Agúndez; Alejandra Orozco	Diving	Women's synchronized 10 metre platform	27 July
Bronze	Aremi Fuentes	Weightlifting	Women's 76 kg	1 August
Bronze	Mexico national under-23 football team: Luis Malagón; Jorge Sánchez; César Montes; Jesús Alberto Angulo; Johan Vásquez; Vladimir Loroña; Luis Romo; Carlos Alberto Rodríguez; Henry Martín; Diego Lainez; Alexis Vega; Adrián Mora; Guillermo Ochoa; Érick Aguirre; Uriel Antuna; José Joaquín Esquivel; Sebastián Córdova; Eduardo Aguirre; Jesús Ricardo Angulo; Fernando Beltrán; Roberto Alvarado; Sebastián Jurado	Football	Men's tournament	6 August

== Competitors ==
The following is the list of number of competitors participating in the Games. Note that reserves in fencing, field hockey, football, and handball are not counted:

Sport	Men	Women	Total
Archery	1	3	4
Artistic swimming	—N/a	2	2
Athletics	12	8	20
Badminton	1	1	2
Baseball	24	—N/a	24
Boxing	1	2	3
Canoeing	0	1	1
Cycling	2	4	6
Diving	8	6	14
Equestrian	4	1	5
Fencing	1	0	1
Football	22	0	22
Golf	2	2	4
Gymnastics	1	3	4
Judo	0	1	1
Modern pentathlon	2	2	4
Rowing	0	1	1
Sailing	2	2	4
Shooting	3	2	5
Softball	—N/a	15	15
Swimming	3	1	4
Taekwondo	1	1	2
Tennis	0	2	2
Triathlon	2	2	4
Volleyball	2	0	2
Weightlifting	2	2	4
Wrestling	1	1	2
Total	97	65	162

- 162 athletes entries to competition, 1 athlete travel as reserve.

== Archery ==
Mexican recurve team qualified for the women's team competition by securing one of three remaining spots available at the 2021 Archery Final Olympic Qualification Tournament in Paris, France. Another Mexican archer secured the last of three available spots with a bronze-medal victory in the men's individual recurve at the 2021 Pan American Qualification Tournament in Monterrey.

Athlete	Event	Ranking round		Round of 64	Round of 32	Round of 16	Quarterfinals	Semifinals	Final / BM	
Athlete	Event	Score	Seed	Opposition Score	Opposition Score	Opposition Score	Opposition Score	Opposition Score	Opposition Score	Rank
Luis Álvarez	Men's individual	662	19	Furukawa (JPN); L 3–7	Did not advance					
Aída Román	Women's individual	665	6	Elwalid (TUN); W 6–2	Pitman (GBR); L 2–6	Did not advance				
Alejandra Valencia	Women's individual	674	4	Kazlouskaya (BLR); W 6–0	Dziominskaya (BLR); W 7–3	Barbelin (FRA); W 6–0	Brown (USA); L 5–6	Did not advance		
Ana Paula Vázquez	Women's individual	637	32	dos Santos (BRA); L 4–6	Did not advance					
Aída Román; Alejandra Valencia; Ana Paula Vázquez	Women's team	1976	2	—N/a		Bye	Germany; L 2–6	Did not advance		
Luis Álvarez; Alejandra Valencia	Mixed team	1336	4 Q	—N/a		Germany; W 6–2	Great Britain; W 6–0	South Korea; L 1–5	Turkey; W 6–2	3rd place, bronze medalist(s)

== Artistic swimming ==
Mexico fielded a squad of two artistic swimmers to compete in the women's duet event by winning the silver medal at the 2019 Pan American Games in Lima, Peru.

Athlete	Event	Technical routine		Free routine (preliminary)			Free routine (final)		
Athlete	Event	Points	Rank	Points	Total (technical + free)	Rank	Points	Total (technical + free)	Rank
Nuria Diosdado; Joana Jiménez	Duet	86.6190	13	86.5333	173.1523	12 Q	86.5667	173.1857	12

== Athletics ==
Mexican athletes further achieved the entry standards, either by qualifying time or by world ranking, in the following track and field events (up to a maximum of 3 athletes in each event):

Key

- Note–Ranks given for track events are within the athlete's heat only
- Q = Qualified for the next round
- q = Qualified for the next round as a fastest loser or, in field events, by position without achieving the qualifying target
- NR = National record
- N/A = Round not applicable for the event
- Bye = Athlete not required to compete in round

Track & road events
Men

Athlete	Event	Heat		Semifinal		Final	
Athlete	Event	Result	Rank	Result	Rank	Result	Rank
Jesús Tonatiu López	800 m	1:46.14	1Q	1:44.77	3	Did not advance	
Jesús Arturo Esparza	Marathon	—N/a				2:31:51	74
Juan Joel Pacheco	Marathon	—N/a				2:23:41	65
José Luis Santana	Marathon	—N/a				2:21:32	56
Noel Alí Chama	20 km walk	—N/a				1:28:23	38
Andrés Olivas	20 km walk	—N/a				1:22:46	11
Jesús Tadeo Vega	20 km walk	—N/a				1:30:37	42
Horacio Nava	50 km walk	—N/a				4:19:00	44
José Leyver Ojeda	50 km walk	—N/a				3:56:53	15
Isaac Palma	50 km walk	—N/a				DNF	

Women

Athlete	Event	Heat		Semifinal		Final	
Athlete	Event	Result	Rank	Result	Rank	Result	Rank
Paola Morán	400 m	51.18 =SB	3 Q	51.06	5	Did not advance	
Laura Galvan	1500 m	4:08.15	12	Did not advance			
Laura Galvan	5000 m	15:00.16	11	Did not advance			
Andrea Ramírez Limón	Marathon	—N/a				DNF	
Úrsula Sánchez	Marathon	—N/a				2:45:45	64
Daniela Torres Huerta	Marathon	—N/a				2:47:15	65
Alegna González	20 km walk	—N/a				1:30:33	5
Ilse Guerrero	20 km walk	—N/a				1:45:47	51
Valeria Ortuño	20 km walk	—N/a				1:41:50	47

Field events

Athlete	Event	Qualification		Final	
Athlete	Event	Distance	Position	Distance	Position
Edgar Rivera	Men's high jump	2.21	=19	Did not advance	
Diego del Real	Men's hammer throw	75.17	15	Did not advance	

== Badminton ==
Mexico entered two badminton players (one per gender) into the Olympic tournament. Rio 2016 Olympian Lino Muñoz and debutant Haramara Gaitan were selected to compete in the men's and women's singles respectively based on the BWF World Race to Tokyo Rankings.

Athlete	Event	Group Stage			Elimination	Quarterfinal	Semifinal	Final / BM	
Athlete	Event	Opposition Score	Opposition Score	Rank	Opposition Score	Opposition Score	Opposition Score	Opposition Score	Rank
Lino Muñoz	Men's singles	Ng (HKG); L (9–21, 10–21)	Cordón (GUA); L (14–21, 12–21)	3	Did not advance				
Haramara Gaitan	Women's singles	Kim G-e (KOR); L (14–21, 9–21)	Yeo (SGP); L (7–21, 10–21)	3	Did not advance				

== Baseball ==
Mexico national baseball team qualified for the first time at the Olympics by winning the bronze medal over the United States and securing an outright berth as the highest-ranked squad from the Americas at the 2019 WBSC Premier12 in Tokyo, Japan.

Summary

Team	Event	Group stage			Round 1	Repechage 1	Round 2	Repechage 2	Semifinals	Final / BM	
Team	Event	Opposition Result	Opposition Result	Rank	Opposition Result	Opposition Result	Opposition Result	Opposition Result	Opposition Result	Opposition Result	Rank
Mexico men's	Men's tournament	Dominican Republic; L 0–1	Japan; L 4–7	3	Israel; L 5–12	Did not advance					6

Team roster

On July 8, 2021, Mexico's final roster was announced. Héctor Velázquez and Sammy Solís were removed from the roster after testing positive for COVID-19. They were replaced by Édgar Arredondo and Fabián Anguamea. Ryan Goins replaced Brandon Laird, who did not receive permission from his professional team to participate.

Player	No.	Pos.	Birth date (age)	Team	League	Place of birth
Édgar Arredondo	17	P	May 16, 1997 (age 29)	(United States) Arizona Diamondbacks (minors)	(United States) Minor League Baseball	(Mexico) Culiacán, Sinaloa
Manny Bañuelos	20	P	March 13, 1991 (age 35)	(Taiwan) Fubon Guardians	(Taiwan) Chinese Professional Baseball League	(Mexico) Gómez Palacio, Durango
Óliver Pérez	29	P	August 15, 1981 (age 45)	(Mexico) Toros de Tijuana	(Mexico) Mexican League	(Mexico) Culiacán, Sinaloa
Juan Pablo Oramas	35	P	May 11, 1990 (age 36)	(Mexico) Olmecas de Tabasco	(Mexico) Mexican League	(Mexico) Villahermosa, Tabasco
Teddy Stankiewicz	36	P	November 25, 1993 (age 32)	(Taiwan) Uni-President Lions	(Taiwan) Chinese Professional Baseball League	(United States) Keller, Texas
Carlos Bustamante	46	P	September 25, 1994 (age 32)	(Mexico) Acereros de Monclova	(Mexico) Mexican League	(Mexico) Navojoa, Sonora
Sasagi Sánchez	48	P	September 25, 1994 (age 32)	(Mexico) Diablos Rojos del México	(Mexico) Mexican League	(Mexico) Mazatlán, Sinaloa
César Vargas	49	P	December 30, 1991 (age 34)	(Mexico) Sultanes de Monterrey	(Mexico) Mexican League	(Mexico) Puebla
Manny Barreda	50	P	October 8, 1988 (age 38)	(United States) Baltimore Orioles (minors)	(United States) Minor League Baseball	(United States) Prescott, Arizona
Daniel Duarte	53	P	December 4, 1996 (age 29)	(United States) Cincinnati Reds (minors)	(United States) Minor League Baseball	(Mexico) Huatabampo, Sonora
Fernando Salas	59	P	May 30, 1985 (age 41)	(Mexico) Olmecas de Tabasco	(Mexico) Mexican League	(Mexico) Huatabampo, Sonora
Fabián Anguamea	66	P	December 21, 1993 (age 32)	(Mexico) Tigres de Quintana Roo	(Mexico) Mexican League	(Mexico) Ciudad Obregón, Sonora
Alexis Wilson	13	C	August 13, 1996 (age 30)	(Mexico) Tigres de Quintana Roo	(Mexico) Mexican League	(Mexico) Los Mochis, Sinaloa
Alí Solís	44	C	September 29, 1987 (age 39)	(Mexico) Sultanes de Monterrey	(Mexico) Mexican League	(Mexico) Mexicali, Baja California
Danny Espinosa	18	IF	April 25, 1987 (age 39)	(Mexico) Acereros de Monclova	(Mexico) Mexican League	(United States) Santa Ana, California
Ramiro Peña	19	IF	July 18, 1985 (age 41)	(Mexico) Sultanes de Monterrey	(Mexico) Mexican League	(Mexico) Monterrey, Nuevo León
Adrián González	23	IF	May 8, 1982 (age 44)	(Mexico) Mariachis de Guadalajara	(Mexico) Mexican League	(United States) San Diego, California
Efrén Navarro	24	IF	May 14, 1986 (age 40)	(Mexico) Toros de Tijuana	(Mexico) Mexican League	(United States) Lynwood, California
Ryan Goins	54	IF	February 13, 1988 (age 38)	(United States) Atlanta Braves (minors)	(United States) Minor League Baseball	(United States) Temple, Texas
Isaac Rodríguez	74	IF	March 3, 1991 (age 35)	(Mexico) Toros de Tijuana	(Mexico) Mexican League	(Mexico) Hermosillo, Sonora
Sebastián Elizalde	5	OF	November 20, 1991 (age 34)	(Mexico) Sultanes de Monterrey	(Mexico) Mexican League	(Mexico) Guaymas, Sonora
Jonathan Jones	27	OF	August 2, 1989 (age 37)	(Mexico) Leones de Yucatán	(Mexico) Mexican League	(United States) Vacaville, California
Joey Meneses	32	OF	May 6, 1992 (age 34)	(United States) Boston Red Sox (minors)	(United States) Minor League Baseball	(Mexico) Culiacán, Sinaloa
José Cardona	33	OF	March 16, 1994 (age 32)	(Mexico) Sultanes de Monterrey	(Mexico) Mexican League	(Mexico) San Nicolás de los Garza, Nuevo León

Group play

Pos	Team	Pld	W	L	RF	RA	RD	PCT	GB	Qualification
1	Japan (H)	2	2	0	11	7	+4	1.000	—	Round 2
2	Dominican Republic	2	1	1	4	4	0	.500	1	Round 1 game #2
3	Mexico	2	0	2	4	8	−4	.000	2	Round 1 game #1

Source: TOCOG and WBSC
(H) Hosts

30 July 12:00 Yokohama Stadium
Team	1	2	3	4	5	6	7	8	9	R	H	E
Mexico	0	0	0	0	0	0	0	0	0	0	4	0
Dominican Republic	0	0	0	0	1	0	0	0	X	1	6	0
WP: Ángel Sánchez (1–0) LP: Teddy Stankiewicz (0–1) Sv: Luis Felipe Castillo (1); Boxscore

31 July 12:00 Yokohama Stadium
Team	1	2	3	4	5	6	7	8	9	R	H	E
Japan	0	1	1	3	0	0	1	1	0	7	10	0
Mexico	1	0	0	1	0	0	0	2	0	4	7	2
WP: Masato Morishita (1–0) LP: Juan Pablo Oramas (0–1) Sv: Ryoji Kuribayashi (1); Home runs: JPN: Tetsuto Yamada (1), Hayato Sakamoto (1); MEX: Joey Meneses (1); Boxscore

Round 1

1 August 12:00 Yokohama Stadium
Team	1	2	3	4	5	6	7	8	9	R	H	E
Israel	1	0	5	0	0	0	6	0	0	12	12	0
Mexico	0	0	4	0	0	1	0	0	0	5	8	1
WP: Zack Weiss (1–0) LP: Manny Barreda (0–1); Home runs: ISR: Danny Valencia (2); MEX: None; Boxscore

== Boxing ==
Mexico entered three boxers (one male and two female) to compete in each of the following weight classes into the Olympic tournament. With the cancellation of the 2021 Pan American Qualification Tournament in Buenos Aires, Esmeralda Falcón finished among the top five of the women's lightweight category to secure her place in the Mexican squad based on the IOC's Boxing Task Force Rankings for the Americas. Rogelio Romero (men's light heavyweight) and Brianda Cruz (women's welterweight) completed the nation's sporting lineup by topping the field of boxers vying for qualification from the Americas in the same system.

Athlete	Event	Round of 32	Round of 16	Quarterfinals	Semifinals	Final	
Athlete	Event	Opposition Result	Opposition Result	Opposition Result	Opposition Result	Opposition Result	Rank
Rogelio Romero	Men's light heavyweight	Bye	Plantić (CRO); W 4–1	López (CUB); L 0–5	Did not advance		
Esmeralda Falcón	Women's lightweight	Nicoli (ITA); L 1–4	Did not advance				
Brianda Cruz	Women's welterweight	Bye	Jones (USA); L 2–3	Did not advance			

== Canoeing ==
=== Slalom ===
With the cancellation of the 2021 Pan American Championships, Mexico accepted the invitation from the ICF to send a canoeist in the men's slalom K-1 to the Games, as the highest-ranked eligible nation from the Americas in the federation's international rankings, marking the country's debut in the sporting discipline.

Athlete	Event	Preliminary						Semifinal		Final	
Athlete	Event	Run 1	Rank	Run 2	Rank	Best	Rank	Time	Rank	Time	Rank
Sofía Reinoso	Women's K-1	128.89	22	135.19	26	132.89	23 Q	136.34	21	Did not advance	

== Cycling ==
=== Road ===
Mexico entered one rider each to compete in both men's and women's Olympic road race, by virtue of his top 50 national finish (for men) and her top 22 (for women), respectively, in the UCI World Ranking.

Athlete	Event	Time	Rank
Eder Frayre	Men's road race	6:15:38	35
Lizbeth Salazar	Women's road race	Did not finish	

=== Track ===
Following the completion of the 2020 UCI Track Cycling World Championships, Mexican riders accumulated spots in the women's team sprint, as well as the women's sprint, and keirin based on their country's results in the final UCI Olympic rankings.

Sprint

Athlete	Event	Qualification		Round 1	Repechage 1	Round 2	Repechage 2	Quarterfinals	Semifinals	Final	
Athlete	Event	Time Speed (km/h)	Rank	Opposition Time Speed (km/h)	Opposition Time Speed (km/h)	Opposition Time Speed (km/h)	Opposition Time Speed (km/h)	Opposition Time Speed (km/h)	Opposition Time Speed (km/h)	Opposition Time Speed (km/h)	Rank
Daniela Gaxiola	Women's sprint	10.682; 67.403	15 Q	Zhong Ts (CHN); L	Bao Sj (CHN); Basova (UKR); L	Did not advance					
Yuli Verdugo	Women's sprint	10.818 (66.556)	19 Q	Starikova (UKR); L	McCulloch (AUS) du Preez (RSA); L	Did not advance					

Team sprint

Athlete	Event	Qualification		Semifinals		Final	
Athlete	Event	Time Speed (km/h)	Rank	Opposition Time Speed (km/h)	Rank	Opposition Time Speed (km/h)	Rank
Daniela Gaxiola; Yuli Verdugo	Women's team sprint	33.097; 54.386	5	ROC; L 32.249; 55.816	2	Lithuania; L 32.808; 54.865	6

Qualification legend: FA=Gold medal final; FB=Bronze medal final

Keirin

Athlete	Event	1st Round	Repechage	Quarterfinal	Semifinal	Final
Athlete	Event	Rank	Rank	Rank	Rank	Rank
Daniela Gaxiola	Women's keirin	2 Q	Bye	3 Q	4	11
Yuli Verdugo	Women's keirin	5	4	Did not advance		

=== Mountain biking ===
Mexican mountain bikers qualified for one men's and one women's quota place into the Olympic cross-country race, by topping the field of nations each vying for qualification at the 2019 Pan American Championships in Aguascalientes.

Athlete	Event	Time	Rank
Gerardo Ulloa	Men's cross country	1:30:57	23
Daniela Campuzano	Women's cross country	1:22:50	16

== Diving ==
Mexican divers qualified for the following individual spots and synchronized teams at the Games through the 2019 FINA World Championships, the 2019 Pan American Games, and the 2021 FINA World Cup series in Tokyo, Japan.

Men

Athlete	Event	Preliminary		Semifinal		Final	
Athlete	Event	Points	Rank	Points	Rank	Points	Rank
Osmar Olvera	3 m springboard	442.45	9 Q	384.80	14	Did not advance	
Rommel Pacheco	3 m springboard	479.25	3 Q	437.65	6 Q	428.75	6
Iván García	10 m platform	316.95	24	Did not advance			
Andrés Villareal	10 m platform	410.30	9 Q	405.55	11 Q	381.75	12
Yahel Castillo; Juan Celaya	3 m synchronized springboard	—N/a				400.14	4
José Balleza; Kevin Berlín	10 m synchronized platform	—N/a				407.31	4

Women

Athlete	Event	Preliminary		Semifinal		Final	
Athlete	Event	Points	Rank	Points	Rank	Points	Rank
Arantxa Chávez	3 m springboard	190.35	27	Did not advance			
Aranza Vázquez	3 m springboard	294.30	8 Q	318.60	4 Q	303.45	6
Gabriela Agúndez	10 m platform	297.65	12 Q	337.30	4 Q	358.50	4
Alejandra Orozco	10 m platform	308.10	9 Q	301.40	12 Q	322.05	6
Dolores Hernández; Carolina Mendoza	3 m synchronized springboard	—N/a				275.10	4
Gabriela Agúndez; Alejandra Orozco	10 m synchronized platform	—N/a				299.70	3rd place, bronze medalist(s)

== Equestrian ==
Mexico fielded a squad of three equestrian riders into the Olympic team jumping competition by winning the silver medal and securing second of three available slots at the 2019 Pan American Games in Lima, Peru. MeanwhIle, one dressage rider was added to the Mexican roster by finishing in the top four, outside the group selection, of the individual FEI Olympic Rankings for Groups D and E (North, Central, and South America).

=== Dressage ===
Athlete	Horse	Event	Grand Prix		Grand Prix Freestyle		Overall	
Athlete	Horse	Event	Score	Rank	Technical	Artistic	Score	Rank
Martha Del Valle	Beduino	Individual	64.876	51	Did not advance			

Qualification Legend: Q = Qualified for the final; q = Qualified for the final as a lucky loser

=== Jumping ===
Athlete	Horse	Event	Qualification		Final		
Athlete	Horse	Event	Penalties	Rank	Penalties	Time	Rank
Eugenio Garza	Armani SL Z	Individual	8	=47	Did not advance		
Enrique González	Chacna	Individual	8	=44	Did not advance		
Manuel González	Hortensia van de Leeuwerk	Individual	12	=55	Did not advance		
Eugenio Garza; Enrique González; Patricio Pasquel	Armani SL Z Chacna; Babel	Team	6+EL	16	Did not advance		

== Fencing ==
Mexico entered one fencer into the Olympic competition. Diego Cervantes claimed a spot in the men's foil by winning the final match at the Pan American Zonal Qualifier in San José, Costa Rica.

Athlete	Event	Round of 64	Round of 32	Round of 16	Quarterfinal	Semifinal	Final / BM	
Athlete	Event	Opposition Score	Opposition Score	Opposition Score	Opposition Score	Opposition Score	Opposition Score	Rank
Diego Cervantes	Men's foil	Huang Mk (CHN); W 15–14	Lefort (FRA); L 11–15	Did not advance				

== Football ==
Summary

Key:

- A.E.T – After extra time.
- P – Match decided by penalty-shootout.

Team	Event	Group Stage				Quarterfinal	Semifinal	Final / BM	
Team	Event	Opposition Score	Opposition Score	Opposition Score	Rank	Opposition Score	Opposition Score	Opposition Score	Rank
Mexico men's	Men's tournament	France; W 4–1	Japan; L 1–2	South Africa; W 3–0	2 Q	South Korea; W 6–3	Brazil; D 0–0 (1–4)	Japan; W 3–1	3rd place, bronze medalist(s)

=== Men's tournament ===
Mexico men's football team qualified for the Olympics by advancing to the final match of the 2020 CONCACAF Men's Olympic Qualifying Championship.

Team roster

Mexico's 22-man final squad was announced on 15 June 2021. On July 4, José Juan Macías withdrew due to injury and was replaced by Adrián Mora.

Head coach: Jaime Lozano

No.	Pos.	Player	Date of birth (age)	Club
1	GK	Luis Malagón	2 March 1997 (aged 24)	(Mexican Football Federation) Necaxa
2	DF	Jorge Sánchez	10 December 1997 (aged 23)	(Mexican Football Federation) América
3	DF	César Montes	24 February 1997 (aged 24)	(Mexican Football Federation) Monterrey
4	DF	Jesús Alberto Angulo	30 January 1998 (aged 23)	(Mexican Football Federation) Atlas
5	DF	Johan Vásquez	22 October 1998 (aged 22)	(Mexican Football Federation) UNAM
6	DF	Vladimir Loroña	16 November 1998 (aged 22)	(Mexican Football Federation) Tijuana
7	MF	Luis Romo*	5 June 1995 (aged 26)	(Mexican Football Federation) Cruz Azul
8	MF	Charly Rodríguez	3 January 1997 (aged 24)	(Mexican Football Federation) Monterrey
9	FW	Henry Martín*	18 November 1992 (aged 28)	(Mexican Football Federation) América
10	FW	Diego Lainez	9 June 2000 (aged 21)	(Royal Spanish Football Federation) Betis
11	FW	Alexis Vega	25 November 1997 (aged 23)	(Mexican Football Federation) Guadalajara
12	DF	Adrián Mora	15 August 1997 (aged 23)	(Mexican Football Federation) Juárez
13	GK	Guillermo Ochoa* (captain)	13 July 1985 (aged 36)	(Mexican Football Federation) América
14	DF	Érick Aguirre	23 February 1997 (aged 24)	(Mexican Football Federation) Pachuca
15	FW	Uriel Antuna	21 August 1997 (aged 23)	(Mexican Football Federation) Guadalajara
16	MF	José Joaquín Esquivel	7 January 1998 (aged 23)	(Mexican Football Federation) Juárez
17	MF	Sebastián Córdova	12 June 1997 (aged 24)	(Mexican Football Federation) América
18	FW	Eduardo Aguirre	3 August 1998 (aged 22)	(Mexican Football Federation) Santos Laguna
19	MF	Jesús Ricardo Angulo	20 February 1997 (aged 24)	(Mexican Football Federation) Guadalajara
20	MF	Fernando Beltrán	8 May 1998 (aged 23)	(Mexican Football Federation) Guadalajara
21	FW	Roberto Alvarado	7 September 1998 (aged 22)	(Mexican Football Federation) Cruz Azul
22	GK	Sebastián Jurado	28 September 1997 (aged 23)	(Mexican Football Federation) Cruz Azul

* Overage player.

Group play

Pos	Team	Pld	W	D	L	GF	GA	GD	Pts	Qualification
1	Japan (H)	3	3	0	0	7	1	+6	9	Advance to knockout stage
2	Mexico	3	2	0	1	8	3	+5	6	Advance to knockout stage
3	France	3	1	0	2	5	11	−6	3	
4	South Africa	3	0	0	3	3	8	−5	0	

Source: TOCOG and FIFA
Rules for classification: Group stage tiebreakers
(H) Hosts
22 July 2021
17:00

Mexico	4–1	France
Vega 47'; Córdova 55'; Antuna 80'; Aguirre 90+1'	Report (TOCOG); Report (FIFA)	Gignac 69' (pen.)

Tokyo Stadium, Chōfu
Referee: Chris Beath (Australia)

25 July 2021
20:00

Japan	2–1	Mexico
Kubo 6'; Dōan 11' (pen.)	Report (TOCOG); Report (FIFA)	Alvarado 85'

Saitama Stadium 2002, Saitama
Referee: Artur Soares Dias (Portugal)

28 July 2021
20:30

South Africa	0–3	Mexico
	Report (TOCOG); Report (FIFA)	Vega 18'; Romo 45+1'; Martín 60'

Sapporo Dome, Sapporo
Referee: Matthew Conger (New Zealand)

Quarterfinal

31 July 2021
20:00

South Korea	3–6	Mexico
Lee Dong-gyeong 20', 51'; Hwang Ui-jo 90+1'	Report (TOCOG); Report (FIFA)	Martín 12', 54'; Romo 30'; Córdova 39' (pen.), 63'; Aguirre 84'

International Stadium Yokohama, Yokohama
Referee: Orel Grinfeld (Israel)

Semifinal

3 August 2021
17:00

Mexico	0–0 (a.e.t.)	Brazil
	Report (TOCOG); Report (FIFA)
Penalties
Aguirre (penalty missed); Vásquez (penalty missed); Rodríguez (penalty scored)	1–4	(penalty scored) Dani Alves; (penalty scored) Martinelli; (penalty scored) Guimarães; (penalty scored) Reinier

Kashima Stadium, Kashima
Referee: Georgi Kabakov (Bulgaria)

Bronze medal match

6 August 2021
18:00

Mexico	3–1	Japan
Córdova 13' (pen.); Vásquez 22'; Vega 58'	Report (TOCOG); Report (FIFA)	Mitoma 78'

Saitama Stadium 2002, Saitama
Referee: Bamlak Tessema Weyesa (Ethiopia)

== Golf ==
Mexico entered four golfers (two per gender) into the Olympic tournament. Abraham Ancer (world no. 23), Carlos Ortiz (world no. 53), Maria Fassi (world no. 180), and Gaby López (world no. 64) qualified directly among the top 60 eligible players for their respective events based on the IGF World Rankings.

Athlete	Event	Round 1	Round 2	Round 3	Round 4	Total		
Athlete	Event	Score	Score	Score	Score	Score	Par	Rank
Abraham Ancer	Men's	69	69	66	68	272	−12	=14
Carlos Ortiz	Men's	65	67	69	78	279	−5	=42
María Fassi	Women's	73	70	68	68	279	−5	=23
Gaby López	Women's	71	72	69	71	283	−1	=38

== Gymnastics ==
=== Artistic ===
Mexico entered two artistic gymnasts into the Olympic competition. Rio 2016 Olympians Daniel Corral and Alexa Moreno finished among the top twelve eligible for qualification in the men's and among the top twenty in the women's individual all-around and apparatus events, respectively, to book their spots on the Mexican roster at the 2019 World Championships in Stuttgart, Germany.

Men

Athlete	Event	Qualification								Final							
Athlete	Event	Apparatus						Total	Rank	Apparatus						Total	Rank
Athlete	Event	F	PH	R	V	PB	HB	Total	Rank	F	PH	R	V	PB	HB	Total	Rank
Daniel Corral	All-around	13.200	13.266	13.366	13.933	14.033	13.100	80.898	40	Did not advance							

Women

Athlete	Event	Qualification						Final					
Athlete	Event	Apparatus				Total	Rank	Apparatus				Total	Rank
Athlete	Event	V	UB	BB	F	Total	Rank	V	UB	BB	F	Total	Rank
Alexa Moreno	All-around	14.633 Q	12.566	11.066	12.333	50.798	55	Did not advance					
Alexa Moreno	Women's vault	14.633	—N/a			14.633	8 Q	14.716	—N/a			14.716	4

=== Rhythmic ===
Mexico qualified one rhythmic gymnast for the individual all-around by winning the gold medal at the 2021 Pan American Championships in Rio de Janeiro, Brazil, marking the country's debut in this sporting discipline.

Athlete	Event	Qualification						Final					
Athlete	Event	Hoop	Ball	Clubs	Ribbon	Total	Rank	Hoop	Ball	Clubs	Ribbon	Total	Rank
Rut Castillo	Individual	22.350	22.700	21.500	16.200	82.750	22	Did not advance					

=== Trampoline ===
Mexico entered one gymnast to compete in the women's trampoline by finishing among the top eight nations vying for qualification at the two-year-long World Cup Series.

Athlete	Event	Qualification		Final	
Athlete	Event	Score	Rank	Score	Rank
Dafne Navarro	Women's	99.850	8 Q	48.345	8

== Judo ==
Mexico qualified one judoka for the women's half-middleweight category (63 kg) at the Games. Prisca Awiti accepted a continental berth from the Americas as the nation's top-ranked judoka outside of direct qualifying position in the IJF World Ranking List of 28 June 2021.

Athlete	Event	Round of 32	Round of 16	Quarterfinals	Semifinals	Repechage	Final / BM	
Athlete	Event	Opposition Result	Opposition Result	Opposition Result	Opposition Result	Opposition Result	Opposition Result	Rank
Prisca Awiti Alcaraz	Women's −63 kg	Bold (MGL); L 00–10	Did not advance					

== Modern pentathlon ==
Mexican athletes qualified for the following spots to compete in modern pentathlon. Mariana Arceo secured a selection in women's event with a gold medal victory at the 2019 Pan American Games in Lima. Mayan Oliver added another women's place on the Mexican squad by finishing among the top eight modern pentathletes vying for qualification in the UIPM World Rankings of 14 June 2021. On the men's side, Duilio Carrillo and Alvaro Sandoval received the spare berths unused at the 2021 Worlds and previously declined by Ireland's Arthur Lanigan O'Keeffe, as the next highest-ranked, eligible modern pentathletes in the same system.

Athlete	Event	Fencing (épée one touch)				Swimming (200 m freestyle)			Riding (show jumping)			Combined: shooting/running (10 m air pistol)/(3200 m)			Total points	Final rank
Athlete	Event	RR	BR	Rank	MP points	Time	Rank	MP points	Penalties	Rank	MP points	Time	Rank	MP Points	Total points	Final rank
Duilio Carrillo	Men's	17	0	20	202	2:04.08	21	302	EL	33	0	11:31.68	22	609	1113	33
Álvaro Sandoval	Men's	11	1	31	167	2:02.52	17	305	EL	33	0	11:26.30	21	614	1086	35
Mariana Arceo	Women's	15	4	29	184	2:16.65	23	277	7	14	293	12:32.16	16	548	1302	16
Mayan Oliver	Women's	16	0	22	196	2:24.16	32	262	7	10	293	12:21.48	12	559	1310	15

== Rowing ==
Mexico qualified one boat in the women's single sculls for the Games by winning the gold medal and securing the first of five berths available at the 2021 FISA Americas Olympic Qualification Regatta in Rio de Janeiro, Brazil.

Athlete	Event	Heats		Repechage		Quarterfinals		Semifinals		Final	
Athlete	Event	Time	Rank	Time	Rank	Time	Rank	Time	Rank	Time	Rank
Kenia Lechuga	Women's single sculls	7:54.21	2 QF	Bye		8:09.29	4 SC/D	7:33.72	1 FC	7:43.55	16

Qualification Legend: FA=Final A (medal); FB=Final B (non-medal); FC=Final C (non-medal); FD=Final D (non-medal); FE=Final E (non-medal); FF=Final F (non-medal); SA/B=Semifinals A/B; SC/D=Semifinals C/D; SE/F=Semifinals E/F; QF=Quarterfinals; R=Repechage

== Sailing ==
Mexican sailors qualified one boat in each of the following classes through the class-associated World Championships and the continental regattas.

Athlete	Event	Race													Points		Final rank
Athlete	Event	1	2	3	4	5	6	7	8	9	10	11	12	M*	Total	Net	Final rank
Ignacio Berenguer	Men's RS:X	25	22	18	18	~~26~~	26	22	23	20	13	23	22	EL	258	232	23
Juan Ignacio Pérez	Men's Finn	~~19~~	17	16	16	17	17	17	16	14	15	—N/a		EL	164	145	17
Demita Vega	Women's RS:X	26	16	15	22	22	19	19	10	20	13	~~28~~	13	EL	223	195	18
Elena Oetling	Women's Laser Radial	41	21	31	19	23	7	19	32	~~43~~	28	—N/a		EL	264	221	32

M = Medal race; EL = Eliminated – did not advance into the medal race

== Shooting ==
Mexican shooters achieved quota places for the following events by virtue of their best finishes at the 2018 ISSF World Championships, the 2019 ISSF World Cup series, the 2019 Pan American Games, and Championships of the Americas, as long as they obtained a minimum qualifying score (MQS) by 31 May 2020.

Athlete	Event	Qualification		Semifinal		Final	
Athlete	Event	Points	Rank	Points	Rank	Points	Rank
Jorge Orozco	Men's trap	122	6 Q	—N/a		28	4
Edson Ramírez	Men's 10 m air rifle	625.9	18	—N/a		Did not advance	
José Luis Sánchez	Men's 50 m rifle 3 positions	1154	33	—N/a		Did not advance	
Alejandra Ramírez	Women's trap	116	13	—N/a		Did not advance	
Gabriela Rodríguez	Women's skeet	118	12	—N/a		Did not advance	
Jorge Orozco; Alejandra Ramírez	Mixed trap team	138	16	Did not advance			

== Softball ==
Mexico women's national softball team qualified for the Olympics by finishing in the top two of the WBSC Women's Softball Americas Qualification Event in Surrey, British Columbia, Canada.

Summary

Team	Event	Round robin						Final / BM	
Team	Event	Opposition Result	Opposition Result	Opposition Result	Opposition Result	Opposition Result	Rank	Opposition Result	Rank
Mexico women's	Women's tournament	Canada; L 0–4	Japan; L 2–3	United States; L 0–2	Italy; W 5–0	Australia; W 4–1	4	Canada; L 2–3	4

Team roster

Softball at the 2020 Summer Olympics – Mexico roster
Players		Coaches
Pitchers: 3 Danielle O'Toole; 12 Dallas Escobedo; 18 Taylor McQuillin; 89 Sierra Hyland	Catchers: 13 Sashel Palacios; 22 Brittany Cervantes; Infielders: 2 Sydney Romero; 8 Tori Vidales; 11 Chelsea Gonzales; 17 Anissa Urtez; 20 Amanda Sánchez; Outfielders: 5 Suzy Brookshire; 10 Nicole Mendes; 16 Tatyana Forbes; 23 Stefanía Aradillas	Manager: 0 Carlos Bernáldez; Coaches: Carlos Caro; Rolando Guerrero

Group play

Pos	Team	Pld	W	L	RF	RA	RD	PCT	GB	Qualification
1	United States	5	5	0	9	2	+7	1.000	—	Gold medal match
2	Japan (H)	5	4	1	18	5	+13	.800	1	Gold medal match
3	Canada	5	3	2	19	4	+15	.600	2	Bronze medal match
4	Mexico	5	2	3	11	10	+1	.400	3	Bronze medal match
5	Australia	5	1	4	5	21	−16	.200	4	
6	Italy	5	0	5	1	21	−20	.000	5	

Source: Tokyo 2020 and WBSC
(H) Hosts

21 July 15:00 (JST) Fukushima Azuma Baseball Stadium 33 °C (91 °F)
Team	1	2	3	4	5	6	7	R	H	E
Mexico	0	0	0	0	0	0	0	0	2	0
Canada	2	0	1	1	0	0	X	4	9	0
WP: Sara Groenewegen (1–0) LP: Dallas Escobedo (0–1) Sv: Danielle Lawrie (1); Home runs: MEX: None; CAN: Jennifer Salling (1); Boxscore

22 July 12:00 (JST) Fukushima Azuma Baseball Stadium 28 °C (82 °F)
Team	1	2	3	4	5	6	7	8	R	H	E
Mexico	0	0	0	0	1	0	1	0	2	6	0
Japan (8)	0	1	0	0	1	0	0	1	3	5	0
WP: Miu Goto (1–0) LP: Danielle O'Toole (0–1); Home runs: MEX: Anissa Urtez (1); JPN: Yamato Fujita (2); Boxscore

24 July 14:30 (JST) Yokohama Stadium 29 °C (84 °F)
Team	1	2	3	4	5	6	7	R	H	E
United States	0	0	2	0	0	0	0	2	6	1
Mexico	0	0	0	0	0	0	0	0	1	3
WP: Cat Osterman (2–0) LP: Dallas Escobedo (0–2) Sv: Monica Abbott (2); Boxscore

25 July 20:00 (JST) Yokohama Stadium 29 °C (84 °F)
Team	1	2	3	4	5	6	7	R	H	E
Italy	0	0	0	0	0	0	0	0	1	0
Mexico	0	1	1	0	3	0	X	5	9	0
WP: Dallas Escobedo (1–2) LP: Greta Cecchetti (0–3); Home runs: ITA: None; MEX: Sydney Romero (1), Anissa Urtez (2), Brittany Cervantes (1); Boxscore

26 July 20:00 (JST) Yokohama Stadium 27 °C (81 °F)
Team	1	2	3	4	5	6	7	R	H	E
Mexico	0	2	0	2	0	0	0	4	11	0
Australia	0	0	0	0	0	1	0	1	5	0
WP: Dallas Escobedo (2–2) LP: Kaia Parnaby (1–2); Home runs: MEX: None; AUS: Jade Wall (1); Boxscore

Bronze medal match

27 July 13:00 (JST) Yokohama Stadium
Team	1	2	3	4	5	6	7	R	H	E
Mexico	0	0	1	0	1	0	0	2	7	1
Canada (bronze)	0	2	0	0	1	0	X	3	6	0
WP: Danielle Lawrie (1–1) LP: Danielle O'Toole (0–2); Boxscore

== Swimming ==
Mexican swimmers further achieved qualifying standards in the following events (up to a maximum of 2 swimmers in each event at the Olympic Qualifying Time (OQT), and potentially 1 at the Olympic Selection Time (OST)):

Athlete	Event	Heat		Semifinal		Final	
Athlete	Event	Time	Rank	Time	Rank	Time	Rank
Gabriel Castaño	Men's 50 m freestyle	22.32	30	Did not advance			
Daniel Delgadillo	Men's 10 km open water	—N/a				1:53:14.4	17
José Ángel Martínez	Men's 200 m individual medley	2:01.34	38	Did not advance			
Melissa Rodríguez	Women's 100 m breaststroke	1:08.76	30	Did not advance			
Melissa Rodríguez	Women's 200 m breaststroke	2:26.87	24	Did not advance			

== Taekwondo ==
Mexico entered two athletes into the taekwondo competition at the Games. 2019 Pan American Games bronze medalist Carlos Sansores (men's +80 kg) and heavyweight champion Briseida Acosta (women's +67 kg) secured the spots on the Mexican squad with a top two finish each in their respective weight classes at the 2020 Pan American Qualification Tournament in San José, Costa Rica.

Athlete	Event	Round of 16	Quarterfinals	Semifinals	Repechage	Final / BM	
Athlete	Event	Opposition Result	Opposition Result	Opposition Result	Opposition Result	Opposition Result	Rank
Carlos Sansores	Men's +80 kg	Šapina (CRO); L 4–6	Did not advance				
Briseida Acosta	Women's +67 kg	Laurin (FRA); L 3–21	Did not advance				

== Tennis ==
Mexico entered two tennis players into the Olympic tournament. Renata Zarazúa (world no. 137) qualified directly as one of the top 56 official entrants in the women's singles based on the WTA World Rankings of 14 June 2021. Moreover, she and her partner Giuliana Olmos opted to play in the women's doubles.

Athlete	Event	Round of 64	Round of 32	Round of 16	Quarterfinals	Semifinals	Final / BM	
Athlete	Event	Opposition Result	Opposition Result	Opposition Result	Opposition Result	Opposition Result	Opposition Result	Rank
Renata Zarazúa	Women's singles	Doi (JPN); L 2–6, 3–6	Did not advance					
Giuliana Olmos; Renata Zarazúa	Women's doubles	—N/a	Badosa / Sorribes (ESP); L 2–6, 7–6^{(7–4)}, [7–10]	Did not advance				

== Triathlon ==
Mexico entered four triathletes (two per gender) to compete at the Olympics. Rio 2016 Olympians Irving Pérez and Cecilia Pérez, with Crisanto Grajales and Claudia Rivas going to their third consecutive Games, were selected among the top 26 triathletes vying for qualification in their respective events, including the inaugural mixed relay, based on the individual ITU World Rankings of 15 June 2021.

Individual

Athlete	Event	Time						Rank
Athlete	Event	Swim (1.5 km)	Trans 1	Bike (40 km)	Trans 2	Run (10 km)	Total	Rank
Crisanto Grajales	Men's	18:23	0:41	57:52	0:34	31:06	1:48:36	31
Irving Pérez	Men's	18:06	0:38	1:01:14	0:30	33:34	1:54:02	46
Cecilia Pérez	Women's	20:05	0:44	Did not finish				
Claudia Rivas	Women's	Did not finish						

Relay

Athlete	Event	Time						Rank
Athlete	Event	Swim (300 m)	Trans 1	Bike (7 km)	Trans 2	Run (2 km)	Total group	Rank
Crisanto Grajales	Mixed relay	4:02	0:35	9:48	0:30	5:47	20:42	—N/a
Irving Pérez	Mixed relay	4:08	0:37	10:20	0:29	6:04	21:38	—N/a
Cecilia Pérez	Mixed relay	4:00	0:39	10:27	0:33	7:00	22:39	—N/a
Claudia Rivas	Mixed relay	4:28	0:43	10:57	0:38	7:08	23:54	—N/a
Total	Mixed relay	—N/a					1:28:53	16

== Volleyball ==
=== Beach ===
Mexico men's beach volleyball team qualified directly for the Olympics by winning the gold medal at the 2018–2020 NORCECA Continental Cup Final in Colima.

Athlete	Event	Preliminary round				Repechage	Round of 16	Quarterfinals	Semifinals	Final / BM	
Athlete	Event	Opposition Score	Opposition Score	Opposition Score	Rank	Opposition Score	Opposition Score	Opposition Score	Opposition Score	Opposition Score	Rank
Josué Gaxiola; José Luis Rubio	Men's	Krasilnikov / Stoyanovskiy (ROC); L (26–24, 15–21, 16–18)	Perušič / Schweiner (CZE); L (21–17, 16–21, 14–16)	Pļaviņš / Točs (LAT); W(21–18, 21–16)	3 Q	Bye	Alison / Álvaro (BRA); L (14–21, 13–21)	Did not advance			

== Weightlifting ==
Mexico entered four weightlifters (two per gender) into the Olympic competition. Ana Gabriela López (women's 55 kg) and Aremi Fuentes (women's 76 kg) secured one of the top eight slots each in their respective weight divisions based on the IWF Absolute World Rankings, with Jonathan Muñoz and Jorge Cárdenas (men's 73 kg) topping the field of weightlifters each vying for qualification from the Americas in the men's 67 and 73 kg category, respectively, based on the IWF Absolute Continental Rankings.

Athlete	Event	Snatch		Clean & Jerk		Total	Rank
Athlete	Event	Result	Rank	Result	Rank	Total	Rank
Jonathan Muñoz	Men's −67 kg	135	8	163	10	298	10
Jorge Cárdenas	Men's −73 kg	145	10	175	10	320	11
Ana Gabriela López	Women's −55 kg	90	6	105	9	195	9
Aremi Fuentes	Women's −76 kg	108	4	138	3	245	3rd place, bronze medalist(s)

== Wrestling ==
Mexico qualified two wrestlers for each of the following classes into the Olympic competition; all of whom advanced to the top two finals to book Olympic spots in the men's Greco-Roman 77 kg and women's freestyle 57 kg, respectively, at the 2020 Pan American Qualification Tournament in Ottawa, Canada.

Key:

- VT (ranking points: 5–0 or 0–5) – Victory by fall.
- VB (ranking points: 5–0 or 0–5) – Victory by injury (VF for forfeit, VA for withdrawal or disqualification)
- PP (ranking points: 3–1 or 1–3) – Decision by points – the loser with technical points.
- PO (ranking points: 3–0 or 0–3) – Decision by points – the loser without technical points.
- ST (ranking points: 4–0 or 0–4) – Great superiority – the loser without technical points and a margin of victory of at least 8 (Greco-Roman) or 10 (freestyle) points.
- SP (ranking points: 4–1 or 1–4) – Technical superiority – the loser with technical points and a margin of victory of at least 8 (Greco-Roman) or 10 (freestyle) points.

Freestyle

Athlete	Event	Round of 16	Quarterfinal	Semifinal	Repechage	Final / BM	
Athlete	Event	Opposition Result	Opposition Result	Opposition Result	Opposition Result	Opposition Result	Rank
Alma Valencia	Women's −57 kg	Koblova (ROC); L 1–3 ^{PP}	Did not advance				11

Greco-Roman

Athlete	Event	Round of 16	Quarterfinal	Semifinal	Repechage	Final / BM	
Athlete	Event	Opposition Result	Opposition Result	Opposition Result	Opposition Result	Opposition Result	Rank
Alfonso Leyva	Men's −77 kg	Chekhirkin (ROC); L 0–3 ^{PO}	Did not advance				15

== See also ==
- Mexico at the 2019 Pan American Games
