= Triathlon at the 2023 Pan American Games – Women's =

Women's individual at the 2023 Pan American Games
- Venue: El Sol Beach
- Dates: November 2
- Competitors: 32 from 15 nations
- Winning time: 1:57:07

Medalists
Gold medal	Lizeth Rueda	Mexico
Silver medal	Carolina Velásquez	Colombia
Bronze medal	Rosa Tapia	Mexico

The women's individual competition of the triathlon events at the 2023 Pan American Games was held on November 2 at El Sol Beach in Viña del Mar, Chile.

== Schedule ==
Date	Time	Round
November 2, 2023	10:00	Final

== Results ==
The results were as follows:

Rank	Triathlete	Nation	Time	Diff
1st place, gold medalist(s)	Lizeth Rueda	Mexico	1:57:07	
2nd place, silver medalist(s)	Carolina Velásquez	Colombia	1:57:28	+0:21
3rd place, bronze medalist(s)	Rosa Tapia	Mexico	1:57:52	+0:45
4	Erica Hawley	Bermuda	1:58:18	+1.11
5	Dominika Jamnicky	Canada	1:58:33	+1:26
6	Emy Legault	Canada	1:58:53	+1:46
7	Erika Ackerlund	United States	1:58:58	+1:51
8	Vittoria Lopes	Brazil	1:59:03	+1:56
9	Djenyfer Arnold	Brazil	1:59:32	+2:25
10	Diana Castillo	Colombia	1:59:47	+2:40
11	Elizabeth Bravo	Ecuador	1:59:49	+2:42
12	Virginia Sereno	United States	2:00:25	+3:18
13	Dominga Jacome	Chile	2:00:34	+3:27
14	Moira Miranda	Argentina	2:00:39	+3:32
15	Leslie Amat	Cuba	2:00:40	+3:33
16	Mercedes Romero	Mexico	2:00:47	+3:40
17	Rosa Martínez	Venezuela	2:00:54	+3:47
18	Luisa Baptista	Brazil	2:01:33	+4:26
19	Niuska Salazar	Cuba	2:00:34	+6:27
20	Catalina Salazar	Chile	2:03:41	+6:34
21	Raquel Solis	Costa Rica	2:05:07	+8:00
22	Zoe Adam	Puerto Rico	2:06:24	+9:17
23	Romina Biagioli	Argentina	2:07:50	+10:43
24	Paula Jara	Ecuador	2:08:07	+11:00
25	Catalina Torres	Costa Rica	2:09:17	+12:10
	Paula Vega	Ecuador	LAP	
	Marlen Aguilar	Independent Athletes Team	LAP	
	Anahí Alvarez	Mexico	DNF	
	Bivian Díaz	Independent Athletes Team	LAP	
	Desirae Ridenour	Canada	DNF	
	Genesis Ruiz	Venezuela	DNF	
	Camila Romero	Dominican Republic	DNF	
