= Triathlon at the 2019 Pan American Games – Men's =

Triathlon – Men's individual at the 2019 Pan American Games
- Venue: Agua Dulce
- Dates: July 27
- Competitors: 32 from 17 nations
- Winning time: 1:50:39

Medalists
Gold medal	Crisanto Grajales	Mexico
Silver medal	Manoel Messias	Brazil
Bronze medal	Luciano Taccone	Argentina

The men's individual competition of the triathlon events at the 2019 Pan American Games was held on July 27 at the Agua Dulce in Lima, Peru. The defending Pan American Games champion is Reinaldo Colucci of Brazil.

The Pan American Games triathlon contains three components; a 1.5 km (0.93 mi) swim, 40 km (25 mi) cycle, and a 10 km (6.2 mi) run.

== Schedule ==
All times are Peru Time (UTC-5).

Date	Time	Round
July 27, 2019	13:00	Final

== Results ==
32 competitors from 17 countries were scheduled to compete.

Rank	Triathlete	Nation	Time	Diff
1st place, gold medalist(s)	Crisanto Grajales	Mexico	1:50:39	
2nd place, silver medalist(s)	Manoel Messias	Brazil	1:50:55	+0:16
3rd place, bronze medalist(s)	Luciano Taccone	Argentina	1:51:03	+0:25
4	Irving Pérez	Mexico	1:51:06	+0:27
5	William Huffman	United States	1:51:09	+0:30
6	Charles Paquet	Canada	1:51:25	+0:46
7	Juan Andrade	Ecuador	1:51:37	+0:58
8	Gaspar Riveros	Chile	1:51:41	+1:02
9	Diogo Sclebin	Brazil	1:51:49	+1:10
10	Matthew Wright	Barbados	1:52:00	+1:21
11	Luis Barraza	Chile	1:52:02	+1:23
12	Austin Hindman	United States	1:52:03	+1:24
13	Willy Kane	Brazil	1:52:12	+1:33
14	Diego Moya	Chile	1:52:31	+1:52
15	Jason West	United States	1:53:19	+2:40
16	Edson Gomez	Mexico	1:53:30	+2:51
17	Martin Bedirian	Argentina	1:53:54	+3:15
18	Ramón Matute	Ecuador	1:54:30	+3:52
19	Richard Forbes	Canada	1:56:16	+5:37
20	Michel Gonzalez	Cuba	1:57:37	+6:58
21	Federico Savecki	Uruguay	1:58:25	+7:46
22	Victor de la Hoz	Cuba	1:58:36	+7:57
23	Rodrigo Bravo	Peru	2:00:42	+10:03
24	Jose de la Torre	Peru	2:01:02	+10:23
25	Petter Vega	Panama	2:02:24	+11:45
26	Billy Gordon	Panama	2:04:00	+13:21
27	Gerardo Vergara	Guatemala	2:04:50	+14:11
28	Alejandro Madde	Bolivia	2:09:26	+18:47
	Carlos Quinchara	Colombia	DNF	
	Brian Moya	Colombia	DNF	
	Jordan Santos	Belize	LAP	
	Ricardo Garcia	El Salvador	LAP	
