= Triathlon at the 2015 Pan American Games – Women's =

Triathlon – Women's individual at the 2015 Pan American Games
- Venue: Ontario Place West Channel
- Date: July 11, 2015
- Competitors: 35 from 13 nations

Medalists
Gold medal	Bárbara Riveros	Chile
Silver medal	Paola Díaz	Mexico
Bronze medal	Flora Duffy	Bermuda

The women's individual competition of the triathlon events at the 2015 Pan American Games was held on July 11, 2015 at the Ontario Place West Channel in Toronto, Ontario, Canada. The defending Pan American Games champion is Sarah Haskins of the United States.

The Pan American Games triathlon contains three components; a 1.5 km (0.93 mi) swim, a 40 km (25 mi) cycle, and a 10 km (6.2 mi) run.

The winner Barbara Riveros of Chile qualified to compete in the triathlon competitions at the 2016 Summer Olympics in Rio de Janeiro, Brazil.

== Schedule ==
All times are Eastern Daylight Time (UTC-4).

Date	Time	Round
July 11, 2015	8:35	Final

== Results ==
=== Race ===
35 competitors from 13 countries were scheduled to compete.

Rank	Triathlete	Time
1st place, gold medalist(s)	Bárbara Riveros (CHI)	1:57:18
2nd place, silver medalist(s)	Paola Díaz (MEX)	1:57:48
3rd place, bronze medalist(s)	Flora Duffy (BER)	1:57:56
4	Elizabeth Bravo (ECU)	1:58:13
5	Chelsea Burns (USA)	1:58:29
6	Ellen Pennock (CAN)	1:58:42
7	Cecilia Pérez (MEX)	1:58:48
8	Sarah Haskins (USA)	1:58:59
9	Paula Findlay (CAN)	1:59:55
10	Pâmella Oliveira (BRA)	2:00:05
11	Romina Biagioli (ARG)	2:00:38
12	Romina Palacio (ARG)	2:00:46
13	Joanna Brown (CAN)	2:02:04
14	Leslie Amat Alvarez (CUB)	2:02:19
15	Valentina Carvallo (CHI)	2:02:58
16	Alia Cardinale (CRC)	2:03:06
17	Luisa Baptista (BRA)	2:05:33
18	Beatriz Neres (BRA)	2:05:34
19	Erin Jones (USA)	2:05:52
20	Melissa Rios (PUR)	2:06:32
21	Valeria Piedra (ECU)	2:07:50
22	Daniela Schoenfeld (GUA)	2:08:23
23	Lisandra Hernandez (CUB)	2:09:31
24	Barbara Schoenfeld (GUA)	2:11:07
25	Steffy Salazar (ECU)	2:13:11
26	Délia Lopez (PER)	2:22:32
–	Maria Victoria Rivero (ARG)	LAP
–	Vivienne Paulett (PER)	LAP
–	Ana Arias (CUB)	LAP
–	Lorena Imaña (PER)	LAP
–	Nicole Wood (PAR)	LAP
–	Claudia Rivas (MEX)	DNF
–	Favia Diaz (CHI)	DNF
–	Militza Rios (PUR)	DNS
