= Triathlon at the 2015 Pan American Games – Men's =

Triathlon – Men's individual at the 2015 Pan American Games
- Venue: Ontario Place West Channel
- Dates: July 12
- Competitors: 35 from 20 nations

Medalists
Gold medal	Crisanto Grajales	Mexico
Silver medal	Kevin McDowell	United States
Bronze medal	Irving Perez	Mexico

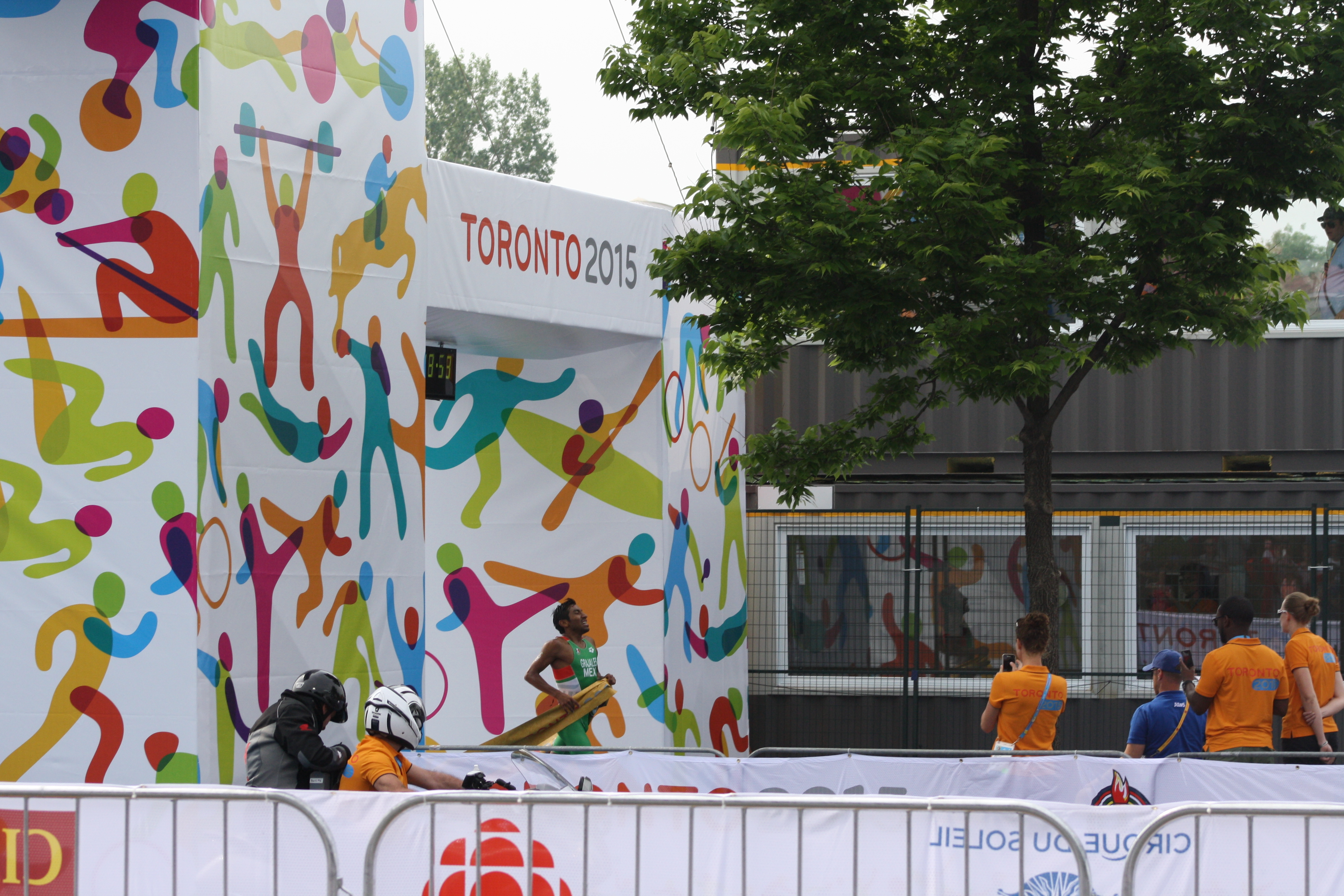
Crisanto Grajales of Mexico crosses the finish line, winning the Pan Am Games triathlon at Toronto.

The men's individual competition of the triathlon events at the 2015 Pan American Games will be held on July 12 at the Ontario Place West Channel in Toronto, Ontario, Canada. The defending Pan American Games champion is Reinaldo Colucci of Brazil.

The Pan American Games triathlon contains three components; a 1.5 km (0.93 mi) swim, 40 km (25 mi) cycle, and a 10 km (6.2 mi) run.

The winner qualified to compete in the triathlon competitions at the 2016 Summer Olympics in Rio de Janeiro, Brazil.

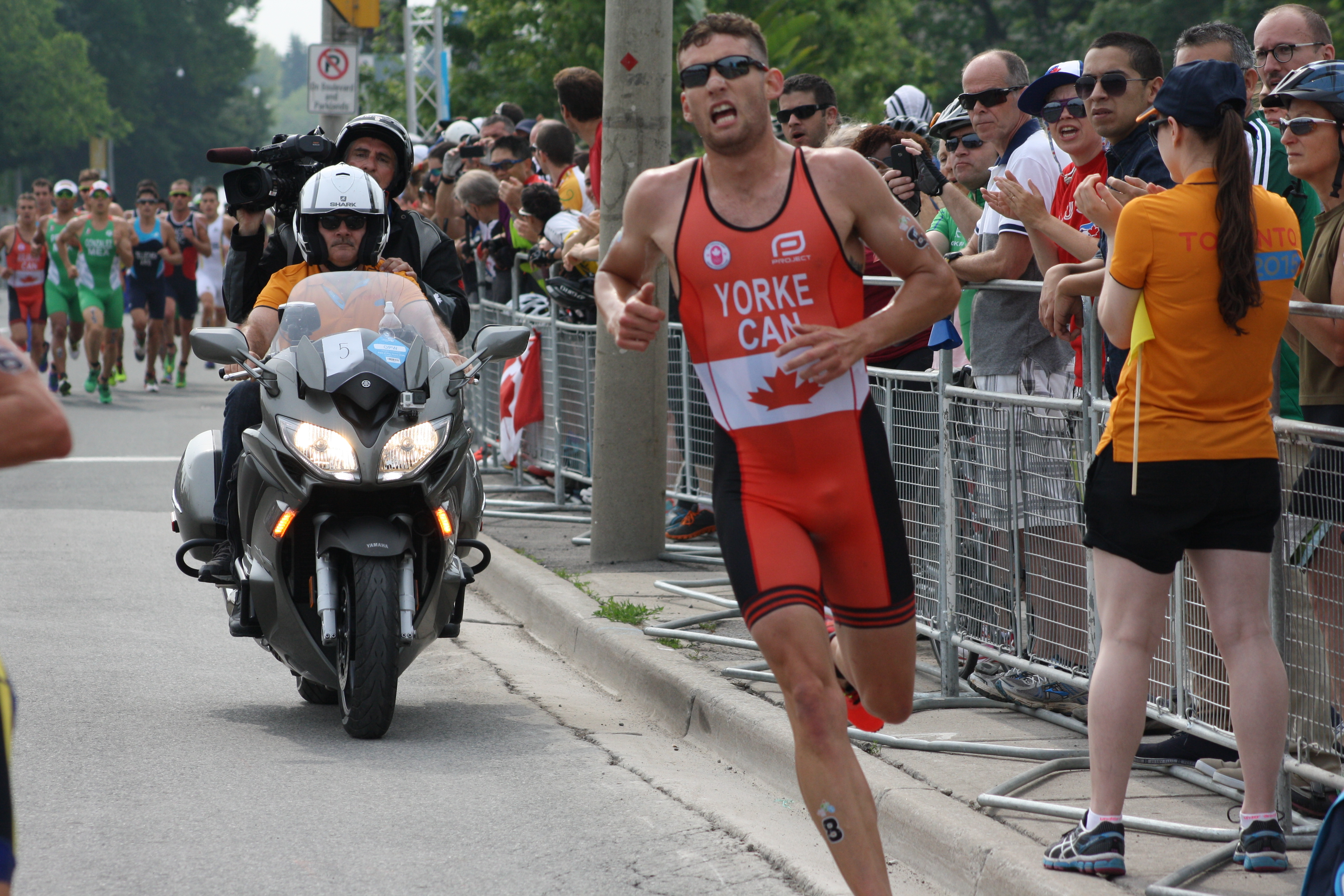
Andrew Yorke competes for Canada at the Pan Am Games triathlon in Toronto.

== Schedule ==
All times are Eastern Standard Time (UTC-3).

Date	Time	Round
July 12, 2015	8:30	Final

== Results ==
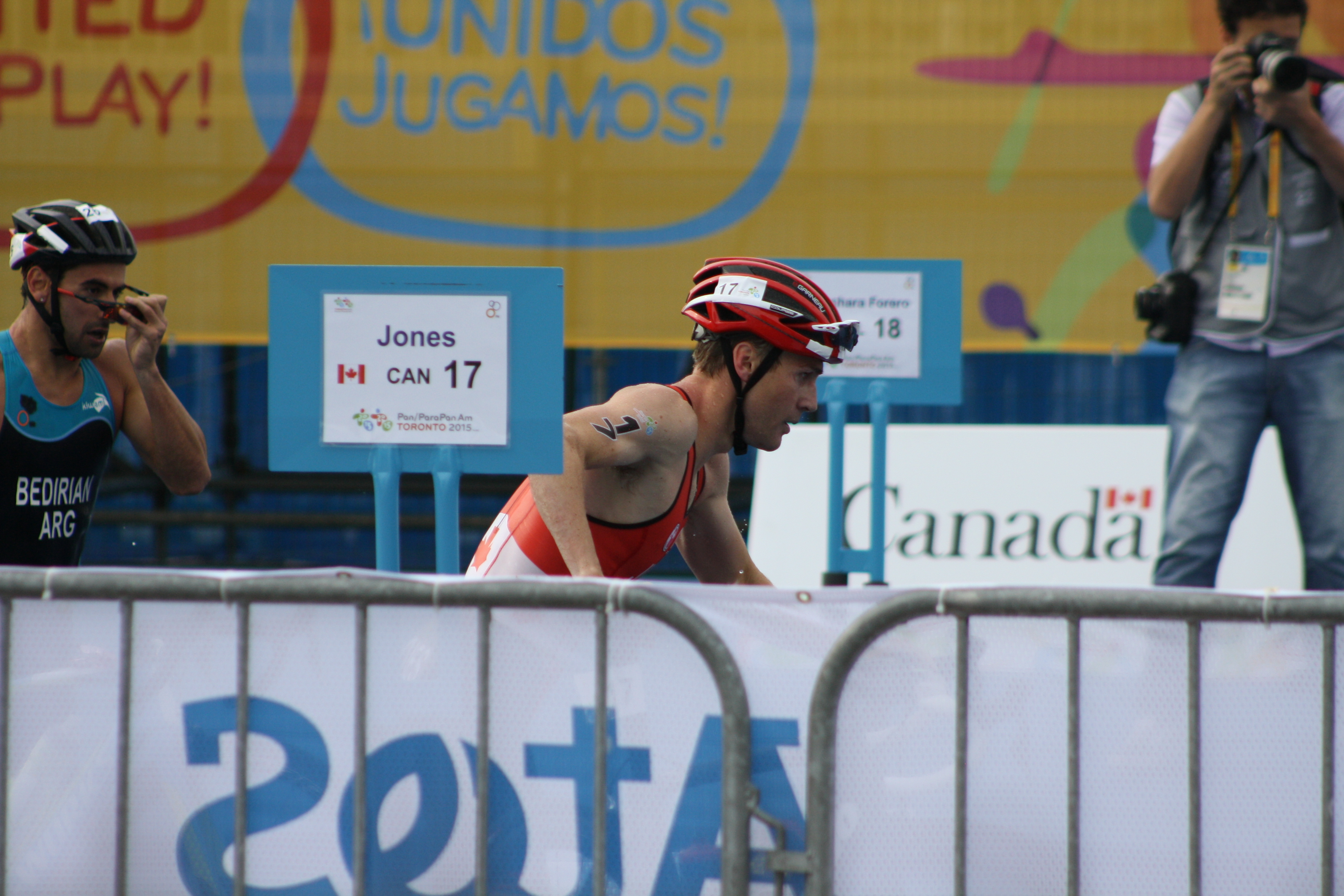
Kyle Jones of Canada in the transition area during the Pan Am Games triathlon in Toronto.

=== Race ===
35 competitors from 20 countries were scheduled to compete.

Rank	Triathlete	Time
1st place, gold medalist(s)	Crisanto Grajales (MEX)	1:48:58
2nd place, silver medalist(s)	Kevin McDowell (USA)	1:48:59
3rd place, bronze medalist(s)	Irving Perez (MEX)	1:49:05
4	Gonzalo Tellechea (ARG)	1:49:12
5	Jason Wilson (BAR)	1:49:19
6	Luciano Taccone (ARG)	1:49:25
7	Andrew Yorke (CAN)	1:49:31
8	Hunter Kemper (USA)	1:49:37
9	Leonardo Chacón (CRC)	1:49:52
10	Tyler Mislawchuk (CAN)	1:49:54
11	Rodrigo Gonzalez (MEX)	1:49:56
12	Juan Andrade (ECU)	1:50:02
13	Carlos Quinchara (COL)	1:50:04
14	Felipe Barraza (CHI)	1:50:15
15	Diogo Sclebin (BRA)	1:50:24
16	Ramón Matute (ECU)	1:50:38
17	Eric Lagerstrom (USA)	1:50:51
18	Michel Gonzalez (CUB)	1:50:57
19	Carlos Enrique Perez (VEN)	1:51:15
20	Carlos Alfredo Perez (VEN)	1:51:23
21	Reinaldo Colucci (BRA)	1:51:24
22	Danilo Pimentel (BRA)	1:51:52
23	Martin Bedirian (ARG)	1:53:23
24	Renze Postma (ARU)	1:55:45
25	Andres Cabascango (ECU)	1:56:49
26	Martin Oliver (URU)	1:57:29
27	Gerardo Vergara (GUA)	1:57:39
	Manuel Huerta (PUR)	DNF
	Hennert Mayorga (NCA)	LAP
	Billy Gordon (PAN)	DNF
	Alvaro Santos Ipabary (BOL)	LAP
	Felipe Van de Wyngard (CHI)	DNF
	Kyle Jones (CAN)	DNF
	Amed Figueroa (BIZ)	LAP
	Gaspar Riveros (CHI)	DSQ
