= Triathlon at the 2019 Pan American Games =

- Triathlon pictogram
- Venue: Chorrillos Beach
- Dates: July 27–29, 2019
- No. of events: 3 (1 men, 1 women, 1 mixed)
- Competitors: 66 from 23 nations

Triathlon competitions at the 2019 Pan American Games in Lima, Peru are scheduled to be held between July 27 and 29, 2019 at Chorrillos Beach.

In 2016, the International Olympic Committee made several changes to its sports program, which were subsequently implemented for these games. Included in this was the addition of the triathlon mixed relay event.

== Medal table ==
Rank	Nation	Gold	Silver	Bronze	Total
1	Brazil	2	2	0	4
2	Mexico	1	0	2	3
3	Canada	0	1	0	1
4	Argentina	0	0	1	1
Totals (4 entries)		3	3	3	9

== Medalists ==
Event	Gold	Silver	Bronze
Men's	Crisanto Grajales; Mexico	Manoel Messias; Brazil	Luciano Taccone; Argentina
Women's	Luisa Baptista; Brazil	Vittoria Lopes; Brazil	Cecilia Pérez; Mexico
Mixed relay	Brazil; Luisa Baptista; Kaue Willy; Vittoria Lopes; Manoel Messias	Canada; Desirae Ridenour; Charles Paquet; Hannah Rose Henry; Alexis Lepage	Mexico; Cecilia Pérez; Irving Pérez; Claudia Rivas; Crisanto Grajales

== Qualification ==
A total of 70 triathletes (35 per gender) will qualify to compete. A nation may enter a maximum of 6 triathletes (three per gender). The host nation (Peru) automatically qualified four athletes (two per gender). All other nations qualified through various qualifying tournaments and rankings. A further three invitational slots, per gender, were also awarded. A maximum five nations could enter the maximum of 6 triathletes.

== See also ==
- Triathlon at the 2020 Summer Olympics
