= Triathlon at the 2020 Summer Olympics – Women's =

Women's triathlon at the Games of the XXXII Olympiad
- Venue: Odaiba Marine Park, Tokyo
- Date: 27 July 2021
- Competitors: 55 from 31 nations
- Winning time: 1:55:36

Medalists
1st place, gold medalist(s)		Flora Duffy	Bermuda
2nd place, silver medalist(s)		Georgia Taylor-Brown	Great Britain
3rd place, bronze medalist(s)		Katie Zaferes	United States

The women's triathlon at the 2020 Summer Olympics took place at the Odaiba Marine Park in Tokyo on 27 July 2021.

Over the course of the swimming and cycling legs, a select group of seven leading competitors had formed, including Bermudian Flora Duffy, Briton Georgia Taylor-Brown, and American Katie Zaferes. After distancing herself from Zaferes early on during the running leg, Duffy won the race and became Bermuda's first Olympic gold medalist. Taylor-Brown, who had suffered a puncture late in the cycling leg, passed several competitors during the running leg to finish second, over a minute behind Duffy, and claim the silver medal, while Zaferes hung on to complete the podium and claim the bronze medal.

== Course ==
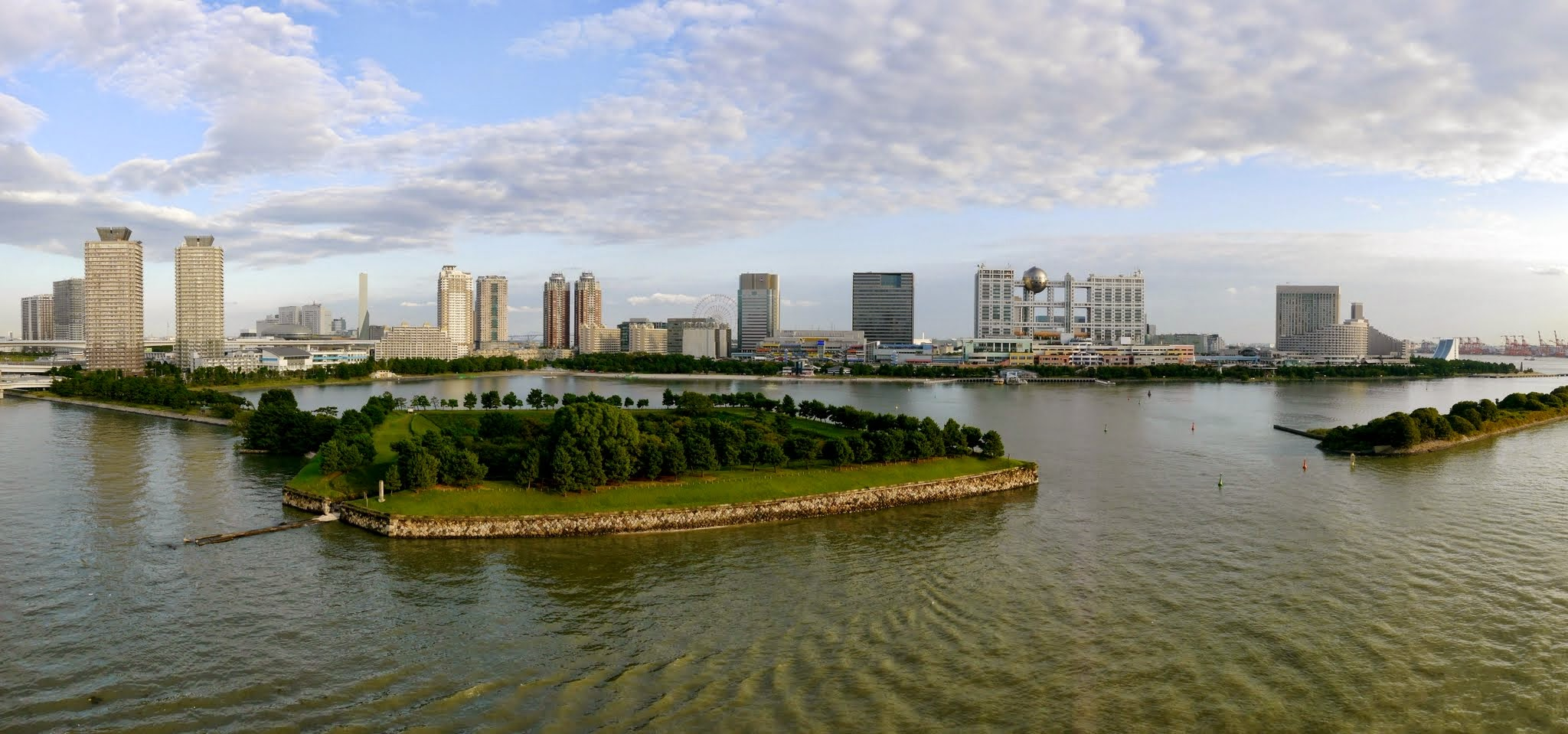
Odaiba as seen from the Rainbow Bridge in 2014

The event took place at the Odaiba Marine Park in Tokyo Bay, and was 51.5 kilometres (32.0 mi) long, the "standard" or "Olympic" distance for a triathlon. Competitors began with a 1.5-kilometre (0.93 mi) swimming leg, consisting of a 950-metre (3,120 ft) lap followed by a shorter 550-metre (1,800 ft) lap. Then, they took on the 40-kilometre (25 mi) cycling leg, which covered eight laps of a 5-kilometre (3.1 mi) course. Finally, competitors finished with four laps of a 2.5-kilometre (1.6 mi) course that made up the 10-kilometre (6.2 mi) running leg. Between each leg, there was also a transition zone in which competitors must change equipment and clothing for the next leg.

== Summary ==
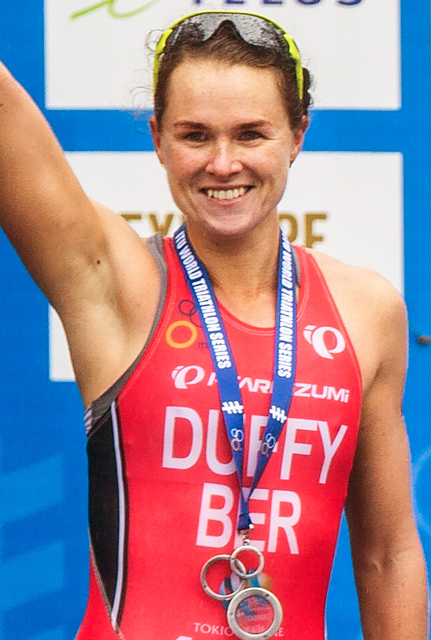
Gold medalist Flora Duffy (shown here in 2015)

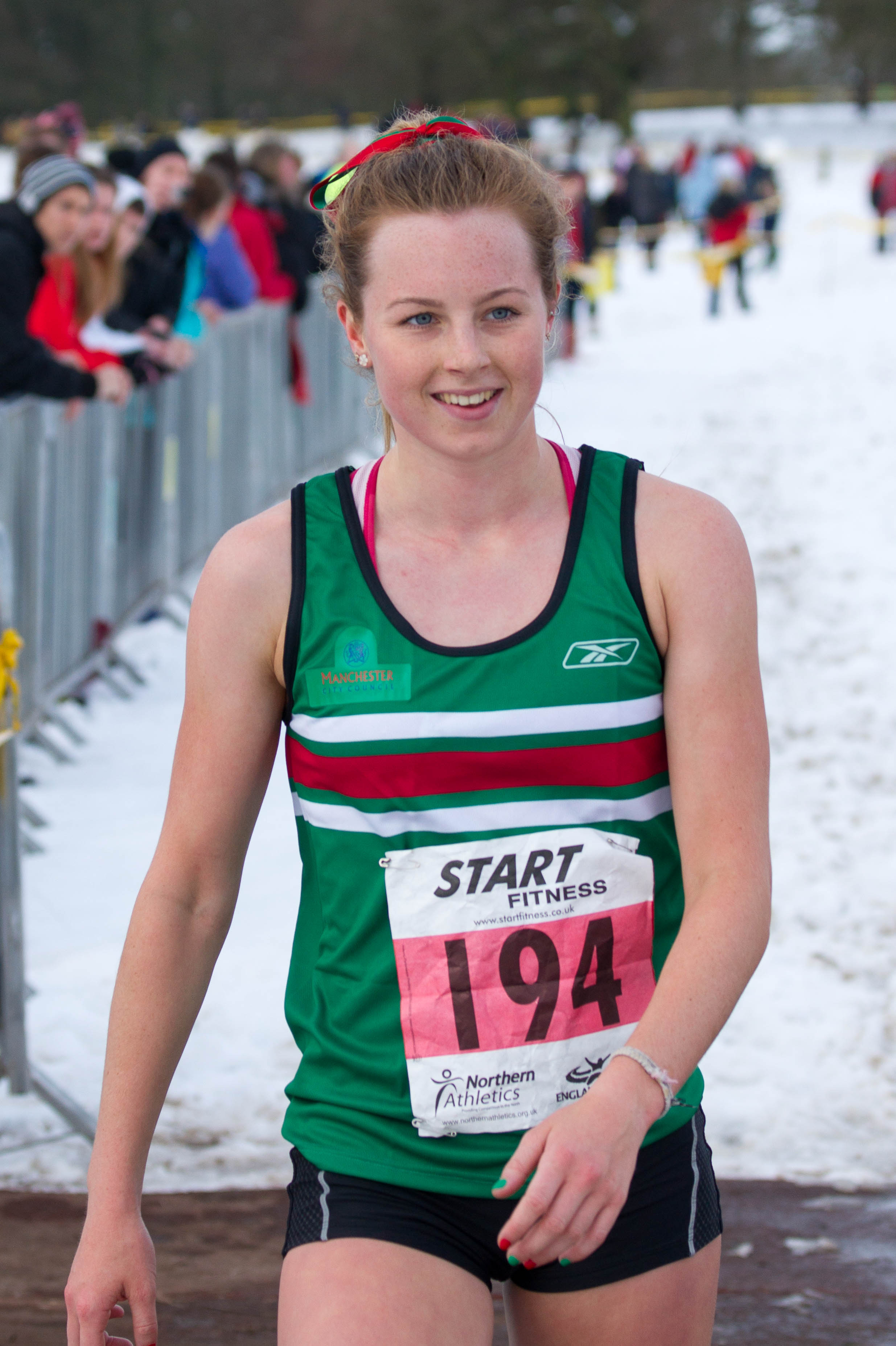
Silver medalist Georgia Taylor-Brown (shown here in 2013)

There were 55 competitors entered into the triathlon, but only 54 started the event; Ukraine's Yuliya Yelistratova did not start after being provisionally suspended. The field included then-reigning world champion Georgia Taylor-Brown of Great Britain, and her three immediate predecessors to that title, 2019 champion Katie Zaferes of the United States, 2018 world champion and compatriot Vicky Holland, and 2016 and 2017 champion Flora Duffy of Bermuda. American Gwen Jorgensen, who won the 2016 Olympic event, was not in the field to defend her title, having retired from the sport to focus on running, but her fellow podium finishers from 2016, silver medalist Holland and bronze medalist Switzerland's Nicola Spirig, both competed.

Heavy rain in the hours before the race delayed the start by at least fifteen minutes, and conditions remained wet during the race. On the first lap of the swimming leg, Jessica Learmonth of Great Britain established the pace. A lead group quickly formed in the water, with Learmonth followed closely by Americans Zaferes and Summer Rappaport, Vittoria Lopes of Brazil, Laura Lindemann of Germany, and Taylor-Brown. At the end of the swimming leg, the lead group of seven had built up an advantage of at least 30 seconds on the rest of the field, which was led out of the water by Emma Jeffcoat of Australia. At the end of the first cycling lap, the leaders' advantage had grown to over a minute ahead of a chase group of 14 that included Spirig, Holland, and the Dutch duo of Maya Kingma and Rachel Klamer. A lack of organization in the chase group left Spirig to lead the chase and reduce the deficit, but with little success. On the next lap, the chase group was reduced to 12, while Rappaport and Lopes were dropped from the lead group on the fourth and sixth laps, respectively. A puncture for Taylor-Brown near the end of the cycling leg saw her cede 20 seconds to the other four leaders heading into the second transition.

Duffy and Zaferes led at the start of the running leg, but by the end of the second lap, the Bermudian began to distance herself. Behind, Taylor-Brown overtook first Lindemann and then Learmonth before passing Zaferes with one lap to go. With a lead of over a minute, Duffy was able to celebrate her victory as she ran down the finishing straight, becoming Bermuda's first Olympic gold medalist. Taylor-Brown and Zaferes both finished over a minute behind Duffy but held on for the silver and bronze medals, respectively, while Lindemann and Learmonth were caught and passed by the faster runners of the chase group.

== Results ==
Rank	#	Triathlete	Nation	Swimming	Cycling	Running	Total time	Difference
1st place, gold medalist(s)	29	Flora Duffy	Bermuda	18:32	1:02:49	33:00	1:55:36	
2nd place, silver medalist(s)	34	Georgia Taylor-Brown	Great Britain	18:31	1:03:11	33:52	1:56:50	+ 1:14
3rd place, bronze medalist(s)	14	Katie Zaferes	United States	18:28	1:02:51	34:27	1:57:03	+ 1:27
4	2	Rachel Klamer	Netherlands	19:17	1:03:05	34:09	1:57:48	+ 2:12
5	31	Léonie Périault	France	19:13	1:03:13	34:06	1:57:49	+ 2:13
6	26	Nicola Spirig	Switzerland	19:32	1:02:50	34:28	1:58:05	+ 2:29
7	54	Alice Betto	Italy	19:14	1:03:11	34:42	1:58:22	+ 2:46
8	10	Laura Lindemann	Germany	18:36	1:02:46	35:48	1:58:24	+ 2:48
9	33	Jessica Learmonth	Great Britain	18:24	1:02:56	35:51	1:58:28	+ 2:52
10	52	Valerie Barthelemy	Belgium	19:18	1:03:07	35:12	1:58:49	+ 3:13
11	1	Maya Kingma	Netherlands	19:20	1:03:03	35:36	1:59:16	+ 3:40
12	27	Zsanett Bragmayer	Hungary	19:19	1:03:07	36:18	2:00:00	+ 4:24
13	32	Vicky Holland	Great Britain	19:12	1:05:24	34:20	2:00:10	+ 4:34
14	12	Summer Rappaport	United States	18:29	1:03:58	36:35	2:00:19	+ 4:43
15	19	Amélie Kretz	Canada	19:39	1:04:56	34:41	2:00:33	+ 4:57
16	11	Taylor Knibb	United States	19:52	1:04:42	35:06	2:00:59	+ 5:23
17	7	Simone Ackermann	South Africa	19:08	1:03:37	37:30	2:01:14	+ 5:38
18	48	Yuko Takahashi	Japan	19:10	1:03:15	37:40	2:01:18	+ 5:42
19	25	Jolanda Annen	Switzerland	19:32	1:05:04	35:36	2:01:31	+ 5:55
20	56	Verena Steinhauser	Italy	19:42	1:04:52	35:56	2:01:47	+ 6:11
21	15	Miriam Casillas	Spain	19:46	1:04:50	36:00	2:01:52	+ 6:16
22	41	Melanie Santos	Portugal	19:32	1:05:07	36:13	2:02:06	+ 6:30
23	40	Carolyn Hayes	Ireland	20:10	1:06:04	34:43	2:02:10	+ 6:34
24	51	Lotte Miller	Norway	19:58	1:04:35	36:49	2:02:43	+ 7:07
25	23	Bárbara Riveros	Chile	19:45	1:04:54	36:49	2:02:46	+ 7:10
26	22	Emma Jeffcoat	Australia	19:06	1:03:18	39:13	2:02:57	+ 7:21
27	38	Lisa Perterer	Austria	20:03	1:06:14	35:26	2:03:00	+ 7:24
28	46	Vittória Lopes	Brazil	18:26	1:03:56	39:21	2:03:09	+ 7:33
29	50	Nicole van der Kaay	New Zealand	19:35	1:05:02	37:34	2:03:26	+ 7:50
30	4	Petra Kuříková	Czech Republic	19:55	1:06:26	36:32	2:04:10	+ 8:34
31	9	Anabel Knoll	Germany	20:05	1:06:14	37:11	2:04:45	+ 9:09
32	45	Luisa Baptista	Brazil	20:12	1:06:04	38:00	2:05:32	+ 9:56
33	24	Romina Biagioli	Argentina	20:09	1:06:06	40:06	2:07:42	+ 12:06
34	53	Claire Michel	Belgium	19:40	1:06:34	43:37	2:11:05	+ 15:29
	55	Angelica Olmo	Italy	20:15	1:06:01	Did Not Finish		
	44	Elizabeth Bravo	Ecuador	20:15	Lapped (Note: Nine triathletes were lapped on the final lap of the cycling leg, as they did not reach the entrance to the corridor to transition 2 before the lead runner.)			
	20	Ashleigh Gentle	Australia	20:07	Lapped			
	3	Vendula Frintová	Czech Republic	20:16	Lapped			
	21	Jaz Hedgeland	Australia	19:44	Lapped			
	16	Anna Godoy	Spain	20:12	Lapped			
	28	Zsófia Kovács	Hungary	20:30	Lapped			
	8	Gillian Sanders	South Africa	20:18	Lapped			
	43	Alexandra Razarenova	ROC	20:17	Lapped			
	18	Joanna Brown	Canada	19:15	Lapped			
	35	Zhong Mengying	China	19:53	Lapped (Note: Zhong, Kivioja, and ElSalamoney were lapped on the sixth lap of the cycling leg.)			
	36	Kaidi Kivioja	Estonia	21:40	Lapped			
	17	Basmla ElSalamoney	Egypt	20:41	Lapped			
	5	Cecilia Pérez	Mexico	20:05	Did Not Finish (Note: Pérez suffered a flat tire on the fourth lap of the cycling lap. However, after she had the wheel replaced at the wheel station, she ultimately abandoned the race.)			
	30	Cassandre Beaugrand	France	19:37	Did Not Finish			
	49	Ainsley Thorpe	New Zealand	19:15	Did Not Finish (Note: Thorpe, Gorbunova, and Kishimoto all crashed on the first lap of the cycling leg and abandoned the race.)			
	42	Anastasia Gorbunova	ROC	19:37	Did Not Finish			
	47	Niina Kishimoto	Japan	19:48	Did Not Finish			
	6	Claudia Rivas	Mexico	Did Not Finish				
	37	Julia Hauser	Austria	Did Not Finish				
	39	Yuliya Yelistratova	Ukraine	Did Not Start (Note: Yelistratova did not start the race after being provisionally suspended.)				
Sources: Official results
