= Triathlon at the 2018 South American Games =

- Venue: Laguna La Angostura
- Dates: May 29–30
- Competitors: 42 from 11 nations

There were 3 triathlon events at the 2018 South American Games in Cochabamba, Bolivia. One each for men and women and a mixed relay event. The events were held between May 29 and 30 at the Laguna La Angostura. This event was a qualification event for the 2019 Pan American Games in Lima, Peru, where the top mixed relay teams qualified.

== Medal summary ==
=== Medal table ===
Rank	Nation	Gold	Silver	Bronze	Total
1	Brazil (BRA)	2	1	1	4
2	Chile (CHI)	1	0	0	1
3	Colombia (COL)	0	2	0	2
4	Ecuador (ECU)	0	0	2	2
Totals (4 entries)		3	3	3	9

=== Medallists ===
Event	Gold	Silver	Bronze
Men	Manoel Messias; Brazil	Carlos Quinchara; Colombia	Kaue Cardoso; Brazil
Women	Barbara Riveros; Chile	Luisa Baptista; Brazil	Elizabeth Bravo; Ecuador
Mixed relay	Brazil (BRA); Manoel Messias; Kaue Cardoso; Luisa Baptista; Vittória Lopes	Colombia (COL); Carlos Quinchara; Brian Moya; Diana Castillo; Lina Raga	Ecuador (ECU); Juan Andrade; Ramon Matute; Elizabeth Bravo; Paula Jara

== See also ==
- Triathlon at the 2019 Pan American Games – Qualification
