= Triathlon at the 2019 Pan American Games – Mixed relay =

Triathlon – Mixed relay at the 2019 Pan American Games
- Venue: Agua Dulce
- Dates: July 29
- Competitors: 40 from 10 nations
- Winning time: 1:20:34

Medalists
Gold medal	Luisa Baptista; Kaue Willy; Vittoria Lopes; Manoel Messias	Brazil
Silver medal	Desirae Ridenour; Charles Paquet; Hannah Rose Henry; Alexis Lepage	Canada
Bronze medal	Cecilia Pérez; Irving Pérez; Claudia Rivas; Crisanto Grajales	Mexico

The mixed relay competition of the triathlon events at the 2019 Pan American Games was held on July 29 at the Agua Dulce in Lima, Peru.

== Schedule ==
All times are Peru Time (UTC-5).

Date	Time	Round
July 29, 2019	9:00	Final

== Results ==
10 nations were scheduled to compete.

Rank	Nation	Triathlete	Time
1st place, gold medalist(s)	Brazil	Luisa Baptista; Kaue Willy; Vittória Lopes; Manoel Messias	1:20:34
2nd place, silver medalist(s)	Canada	Desirae Ridenour; Charles Paquet; Hannah Rose Henry; Alexis Lepage	1:20:51
3rd place, bronze medalist(s)	Mexico	Cecilia Pérez; Irving Pérez; Claudia Rivas; Crisanto Grajales	1:20:57
4	United States	Avery Evenson; William Huffman; Sophie Chase; Austin Hindman	1:21:10
5	Ecuador	Elizabeth Bravo; Juan Andrade; Paula Jara; Ramon Matute	1:22:47
6	Colombia	Lina Raga; Carlos Quinchara; Diana Castillo; Brian Moya	1:22:53
7	Argentina	Romina Biagioli; Martin Bedirian; Delfina Alvarez; Luciano Taccone	1:23:34
8	Chile	Catalina Salazar; Luis Barraza; Macarena Salazar; Diego Moya	1:26:30
9	Cuba	Leslie Amat Alvarez; Victor de la Hoz; Daniela Ciara; Michel Gonzalez	1:27:29
10	Peru	Ada Bravo; Jose de la Torre; Blanca Kometter; Rodrigo Bravo	1:31:36
