= Triathlon at the 2015 Pan American Games =

- Triathlon pictogram for the games
- Venues: Ontario Place West Channel
- Dates: July 11–12
- No. of events: 2 (1 men, 1 women)
- Competitors: 69 from 24 nations

Triathlon competitions at the 2015 Pan American Games in Toronto were held from July 11 to 12 at the Ontario Place West Channel. The Pan American Games triathlon contained three components; a 1.5 km (0.93 mi) swim, 40 km (25 mi) cycle, and a 10 km (6.2 mi) run. There was a total of two medal events in the sport (one each for men and women).

== Competition schedule ==
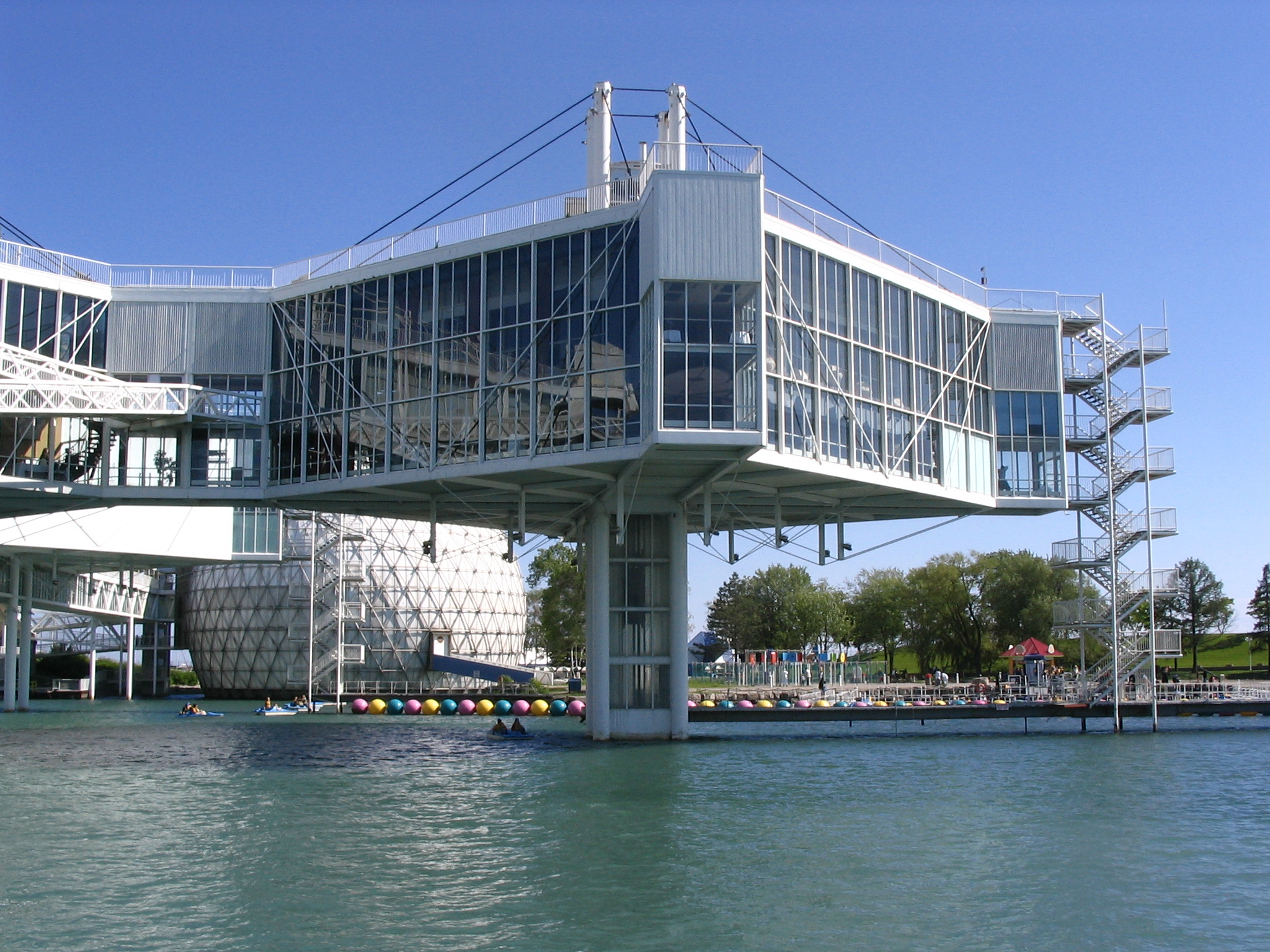
The Ontario Place West Channel, in Toronto, was the venue for the triathlon competitions. Pictured here is the swimming portion of the venue

The following was the competition schedule for the triathlon competitions:

F	Final

Event↓/Date →	Sat 11	Sun 12
Men's		F
Women's	F	

== Medal table ==
Rank	Nation	Gold	Silver	Bronze	Total
1	Mexico	1	1	1	3
2	Chile	1	0	0	1
3	United States	0	1	0	1
4	Bermuda	0	0	1	1
Totals (4 entries)		2	2	2	6

== Medalists ==
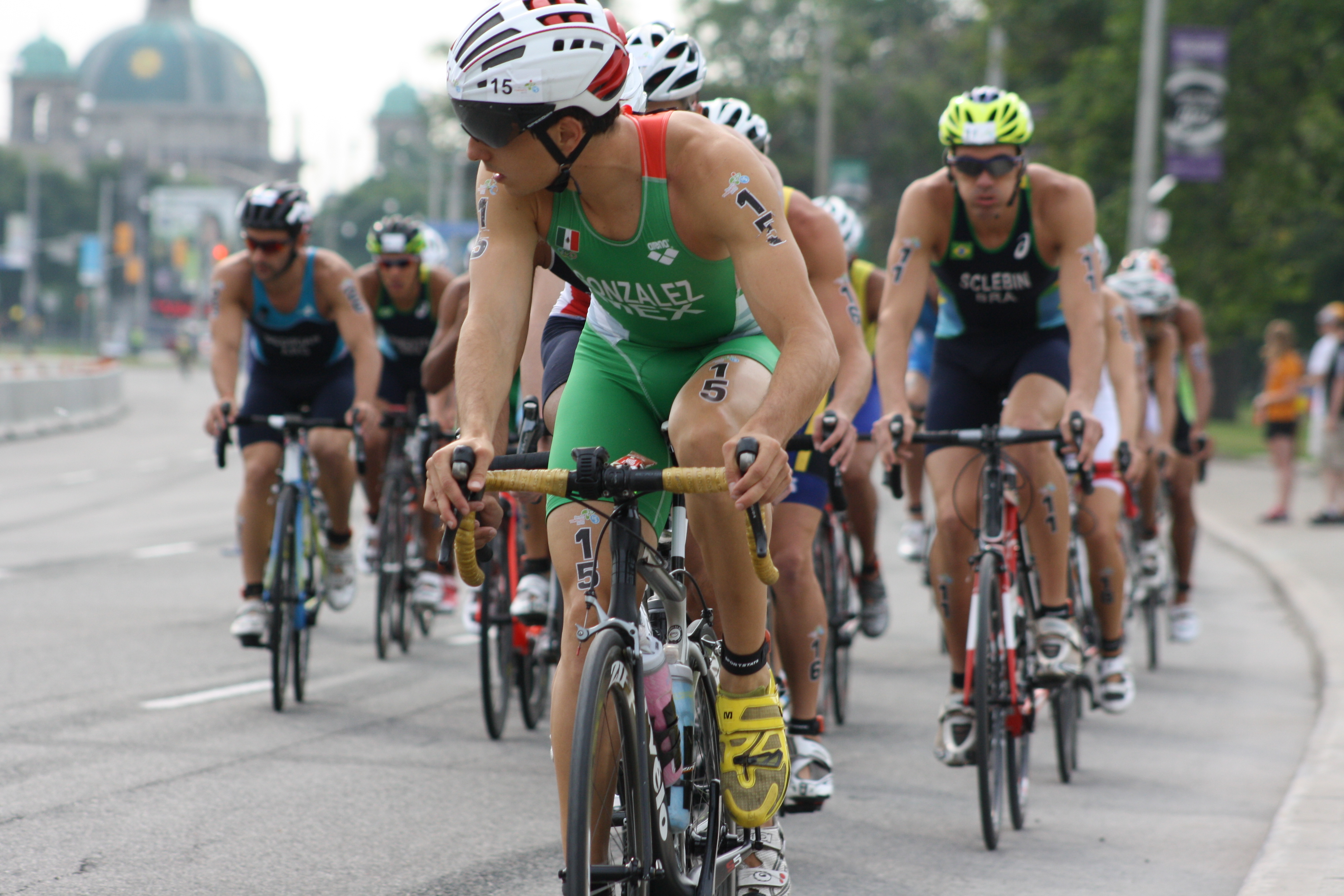
During the competition

Event	Gold	Silver	Bronze
Men's individual	Crisanto Grajales; Mexico	Kevin McDowell; United States	Irving Perez; Mexico
Women's individual	Bárbara Riveros; Chile	Paola Diaz; Mexico	Flora Duffy; Bermuda

== Participating nations ==
A total of 24 countries qualified triathletes. The number of triathletes a nation entered is in parentheses beside the name of the country.

- Argentina (6)
- Aruba (1)
- Barbados (1)
- Belize (1)
- Bermuda (1)
- Bolivia (1)
- Brazil (6)
- Canada (6)
- Chile (6)
- Colombia (1)
- Costa Rica (2)
- Cuba (4)
- Dominican Republic (1)
- Ecuador (6)
- Guatemala (3)
- Mexico (6)
- Nicaragua (1)
- Panama (1)
- Paraguay (1)
- Peru (3)
- Puerto Rico (3)
- United States (6)
- Uruguay (1)
- Venezuela (2)

== Qualification ==
A total of 70 triathletes (35 men and 35 women) qualified to compete at the games. A nation could enter a maximum of six athletes (three per gender). Triathletes qualified through various qualification events and rankings in 2014 and 2015. The host nation Canada, automatically qualified a full team of six athletes. There was an additional three wild card spots per gender awarded.

== See also ==
- Triathlon at the 2016 Summer Olympics
