= Ellen Pennock =

Canadian triathlete

Personal information
- Born: December 18, 1992 (age 33) Calgary, Alberta, Canada
- Height: 1.68 m (5 ft 6 in)
- Weight: 55 kg (121 lb)
- Website: EllenPennock.com

Sport
- Country: Canada
- Sport: Triathlon

Ellen Pennock (born December 18, 1992) is a Canadian triathlete. She competed at several World Cups and international triathlon competitions. She finished 15th at the 2011 World Junior Triathlon Championships and 2nd at the 2013 ITU World Cup in Edmonton, Alberta, Canada. She finished in sixth place in the women's event at the 2015 Pan American Games.
