= Triathlon at the 2019 Pan American Games – Qualification =

The following is the qualification system for the triathlon at the 2019 Pan American Games event and qualified athletes/quotas.

== Qualification system ==
A total of 70 triathletes (35 per gender) will qualify to compete. A nation may enter a maximum of 6 triathletes (three per gender). The host nation (Peru) automatically qualified four athletes (two per gender). All other nations qualified through various qualifying tournaments and rankings. A further three invitational slots, per gender, were also awarded. A maximum five nations could enter the maximum of 6 triathletes.

The top placed mixed relay team at the 2018 South American Games and 2018 Central American and Caribbean Games each qualified two athletes per gender. The top five teams not qualified at the Pan American Mixed Relays Championship also qualified two quotas per gender. The rest of the slots were awarded through the ITU World Ranking as of April 30, 2019 and through wild card slots. An athlete could not earn more than one slot for their country.

A country may enter the mixed relay competition if it has qualified at least two male and two female triathletes.

== Qualification timeline ==
Events	Date	Venue
2018 South American Games	May 29–30	(Bolivia) Cochabamba
2018 Central American and Caribbean Games	August 1–2	(Colombia) Barranquilla
2018 Pan American Mixed Relays Championship	October 13–14	(United States) Sarasota
ITU World Rankings	April 30, 2019	—N/a
Wildcards	Before May 31, 2019	—N/a

== Qualification summary ==
NOC	Men	Women	Mixed relay	Total
Argentina	3	3	X	6
Barbados	2			2
Belize	1			1
Bermuda	1	2		3
Bolivia	1			1
Brazil	3	3	X	6
Canada	3	3	X	6
Chile	2	2	X	4
Colombia	2	2	X	4
Costa Rica		2		2
Cuba	2	2	X	4
Dominican Republic		1		1
Ecuador	2	2	X	4
El Salvador	1			1
Jamaica		1		1
Guatemala	1	2		3
Mexico	3	3	X	6
Panama	2			2
Peru	2	2	X	4
Puerto Rico		1		1
United States	3	3	X	6
Uruguay	1			1
Venezuela		1		1
Total: 23 NOCs	35	35	10	70

== Qualification progress ==
Event	Quotas	Men	Women
Host nation	2	Peru; Peru	Peru; Peru
2018 South American Games	2	Brazil; Brazil	Brazil; Brazil
2018 Central American and Caribbean Games	2	Mexico; Mexico	Mexico; Mexico
2018 Pan American Mixed Relay Championships	~~10~~ 6	United States; United States; Canada; Canada; Argentina; Argentina	United States; United States; Canada; Canada; Argentina; Argentina
ITU World Rankings	~~16~~ 20	United States; Mexico; Canada; Brazil; Colombia; Ecuador; Chile; Chile; Colombia; Barbados; Argentina; Ecuador; Panama; Bermuda; Panama; Cuba; Uruguay; Barbados; Cuba; Guatemala	United States; Bermuda; Chile; Brazil; Ecuador; Mexico; Colombia; Cuba; Colombia; Ecuador; Canada; Chile; Bermuda; Puerto Rico; Costa Rica; Cuba; Argentina; Costa Rica; Guatemala; Guatemala
Invitational	3	Belize; Bolivia; El Salvador	Jamaica; Dominican Republic; Venezuela
Total	35		

- Only three teams that were eligible earned spots at the Pan American Mixed Relay Championships.
