= Jaz Hedgeland =

Australian triathlete

Personal information
- Nationality: Australian
- Born: 21 June 1995 (age 29); Perth, Western Australia

Sport
- Sport: Triathlon

Jaz Hedgeland (born 21 June 1995) is an Australian triathlete. She competed in the women's event at the 2020 Summer Olympics.
