= Angelica Olmo =

Italian triathlete (born 1996)

Personal information
- Nationality: Italian
- Born: 18 June 1996 (age 28); Pavia, Italy

Sport
- Sport: Triathlon

Angelica Olmo (born 18 June 1996) is an Italian triathlete. She competed in the women's event at the 2020 Summer Olympics.
