= Manoel Messias =

Brazilian triathlete (born 1996)

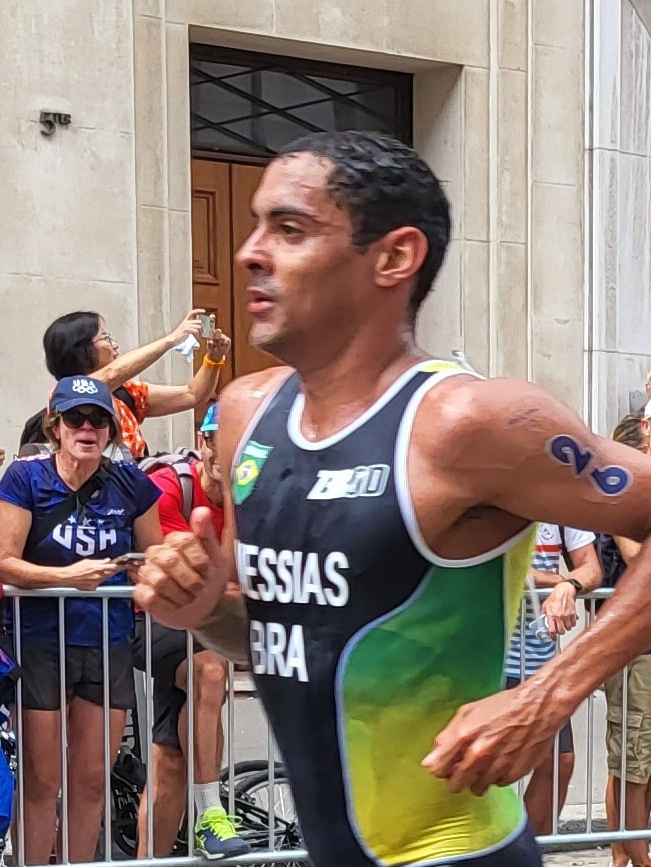
- Manoel Messias in 2024

Personal information
- Born: 19 November 1996 (age 29) Fortaleza, Brazil

Sport
- Country: Brazil
- Sport: Triathlon
Medal record
Men's triathlon
Representing Brazil
Pan American Games
Gold medal – first place	2019 Lima	Mixed relay
Gold medal – first place	2023 Santiago	Mixed relay
Silver medal – second place	2019 Lima	Men
South American Games
Gold medal – first place	2018 Cochabamba	Men
Gold medal – first place	2018 Cochabamba	Mixed relay
Silver medal – second place	2022 Asunción	Men

Manoel Messias Dos Santos Júnior (born 19 November 1996) is a Brazilian triathlete. He won the silver medal in the men's triathlon at the 2019 Pan American Games. He also won the gold medal in the mixed relay event together with Luisa Baptista, Vittória Lopes and Kaue Willy.

In 2021, he competed in the men's triathlon at the 2020 Summer Olympics held in Tokyo, Japan.
