= Lizeth Rueda =

Mexican swimmer (born 1994)

Personal information
- Full name: Lizeth Rueda Santos
- Born: 7 March 1994 (age 32) Guadalajara, Mexico
- Height: 157 cm (5 ft 2 in)

Sport
- Sport: Triathlon, Swimming
Medal record
Triathlon
Representing Mexico
Pan American Games
Gold medal – first place	2023 Santiago	Women's

Lizeth Rueda Santos (born 7 March 1994) is a Mexican distance swimmer and triathlete. At the 2012 Summer Olympics, she competed in the Women's marathon 10 kilometre, finishing in 21st place. She was born in Guadalajara.

== Sporting Events ==
Event	Event Location	Event Type	Date	Time	Place	Source
FINA 10 Kilometer World Cup	Cancun	Buoy course	9 October 2010	2:25:58	7th	
FINA 10 Kilometer World Cup	Santos	Buoy course	17 April. 2011	2:13:22	13th	
FINA World Championships	Shanghai	Buoy Course	16 July 2011	2:06:52	33rd	
Pan American Games	Puerto Vallarta	Buoy Course	22 October 2011	2:06:27	8th	
FINA 10 Kilometer World Cup	Santos	Buoy Course	29 January 2012	2:27:50	23rd	
Olympic Games	London	Buoy Course	9 August 2012	2:02:46	21st	
Triathlon Junior National Championships	Mexico	Triathlon	1 January 2013	01:07:32	4th	
Triathlon National Championships	Mexico	Triathlon	1 January 2013	01:07:55	12th	
FINA 10 Kilometer World Cup	Cozumel	Buoy Course	13 April 2013	2:20:11	37th	
FINA World Championships	Barcelona	Buoy Course	19 July 2013	1:58:36	22nd	
FINA 10 Kilometer World Cups	Cancun	Buoy Course	5 April 2014	2:16:19	19th	
PATCO Sprint Triathlon Pan American Cup	Ixtapa	Triathlon	24 May 2014	01:06:59	12th	
PATCO Triathlon Panamerican Cup	La Paz	Triathlon	14 March 2020	02:08:33	1st	
