= Romina Biagioli =

Argentine triathlete

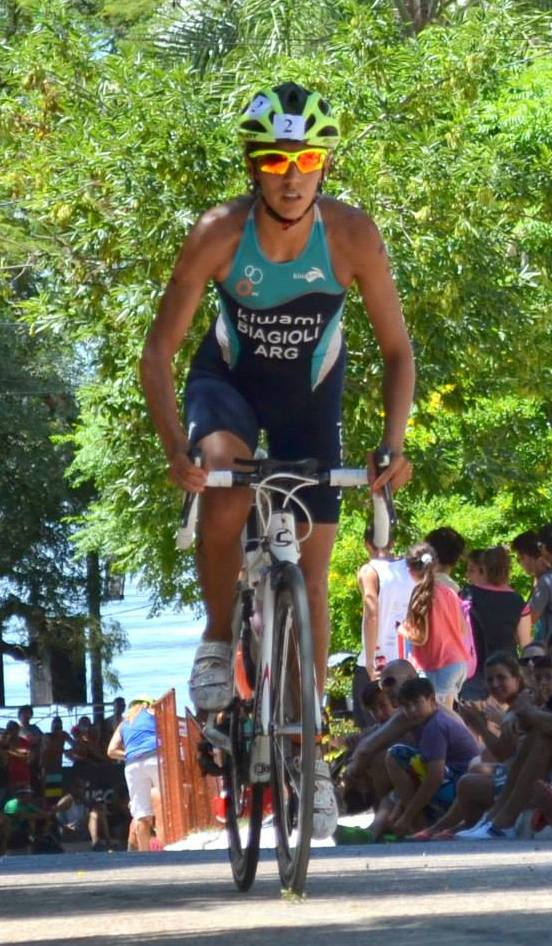

Personal information
- Born: 3 April 1989 (age 36) Córdoba, Argentina

Sport
- Sport: Triathlon

Romina Biagioli (born 3 April 1989) is an Argentine triathlete. She competed in the women's event at the 2020 Summer Olympics held in Tokyo, Japan.

== Career ==
She finished in 9th place in the women's triathlon at the 2019 Pan American Games held in Lima, Peru. She also competed in the mixed relay event.

She competed in the women's triathlon at the 2024 Summer Olympics in Paris, France.

Her sister is swimmer Cecilia Biagioli.
