= Paola Díaz =

Mexican triathlete (born 1992)

Paola Diaz
Personal information
- Full name: Paola Alejandra Díaz
- Born: 18 January 1992 (age 34) Mexico City, Mexico

Sport
- Sport: Triathlon
Medal record
Women's triathlon
Pan American Games
Silver medal – second place	2015 Toronto	Women's event

Paola Alejandra Díaz (born 18 January 1992) is a Mexican triathlete. She won the silver medal in the women's event at the 2015 Pan American Games.
