= Alexis Lepage =

Canadian triathlete

Personal information
- Nationality: Canada
- Born: 26 April 1994 (age 32) Montreal, Quebec, Canada
- Height: 1.94 m (6 ft 4 in)

Sport
- Sport: Triathlon
Medal record
Men's Triathlon
Representing Canada
Pan American Games
Silver medal – second place	2019 Lima	Mixed relay

Alexis Lepage (born 26 April 1994) is a Canadian triathlete. He competed in the 2020 Summer Olympics.
