= Vittória Lopes =

Brazilian triathlete (born 1996)

Personal information
- Born: 15 March 1996 (age 30) Fortaleza, Brazil

Sport
- Country: Brazil
- Sport: Triathlon
Medal record
Women's triathlon
Representing Brazil
Pan American Games
Gold medal – first place	2019 Lima	Mixed relay
Gold medal – first place	2023 Santiago	Mixed relay
Silver medal – second place	2019 Lima	Women
South American Games
Gold medal – first place	2018 Cochabamba	Mixed relay
Silver medal – second place	2022 Asunción	Women
Military World Games
Gold medal – first place	2019 Wuhan	Women team
Bronze medal – third place	2019 Wuhan	Women

Vittória Lopes de Mello (born 15 March 1996) is a Brazilian triathlete. She won the silver medal in the women's triathlon at the 2019 Pan American Games. She also won the gold medal in the mixed relay event together with Luisa Baptista, Kaue Willy and Manoel Messias.

In 2019, she also competed at the 2019 Military World Games held in Wuhan, China where she won the bronze medal in the women's triathlon and the gold medal in the women's team event together with Luisa Baptista and Beatriz Neres.

She represented Brazil at the 2020 Summer Olympics in Tokyo, Japan in the women's event.

In 2023, she won the Escape From Alcatraz triathlon in San Francisco in a time of 02:21:22.

She competed in the women's triathlon at the 2024 Summer Olympics in Paris, France.
