= Claudia Rivas =

Mexican triathlete (born 1989)

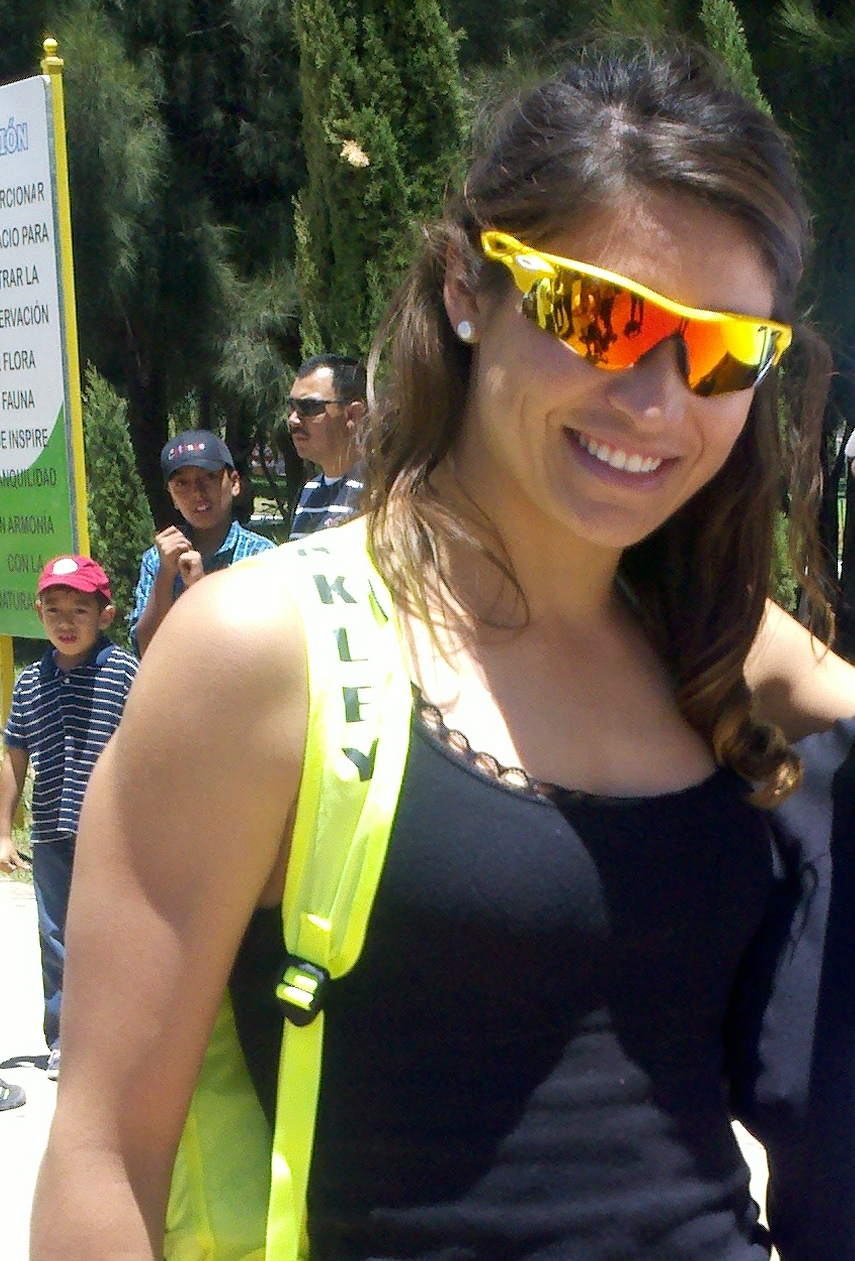
- Rivas in 2012

Personal information
- Full name: Claudia Rivas Vega
- Born: 15 June 1989 (age 37) Valparaíso, Zacatecas, Mexico
- Height: 171 cm (5 ft 7 in)

Sport
- Sport: Triathlon
Medal record
Representing Mexico
Pan American Games
Bronze medal – third place	2019 Lima	Mixed relay

Claudia Rivas Vega (Note: In this Spanish name, the first or paternal surname is Rivas and the second or maternal family name is Vega.) (born 15 June 1989) is a Mexican triathlete. She competed in the women's event at the 2012 Summer Olympics. She competed in the women's event at the 2015 Pan American Games, but failed to finish.

She finished 9th in the women's event at the 2016 Olympic Games, the best ever from a Mexican triathlete of any gender.
