= Charles Paquet =

Canadian triathlete

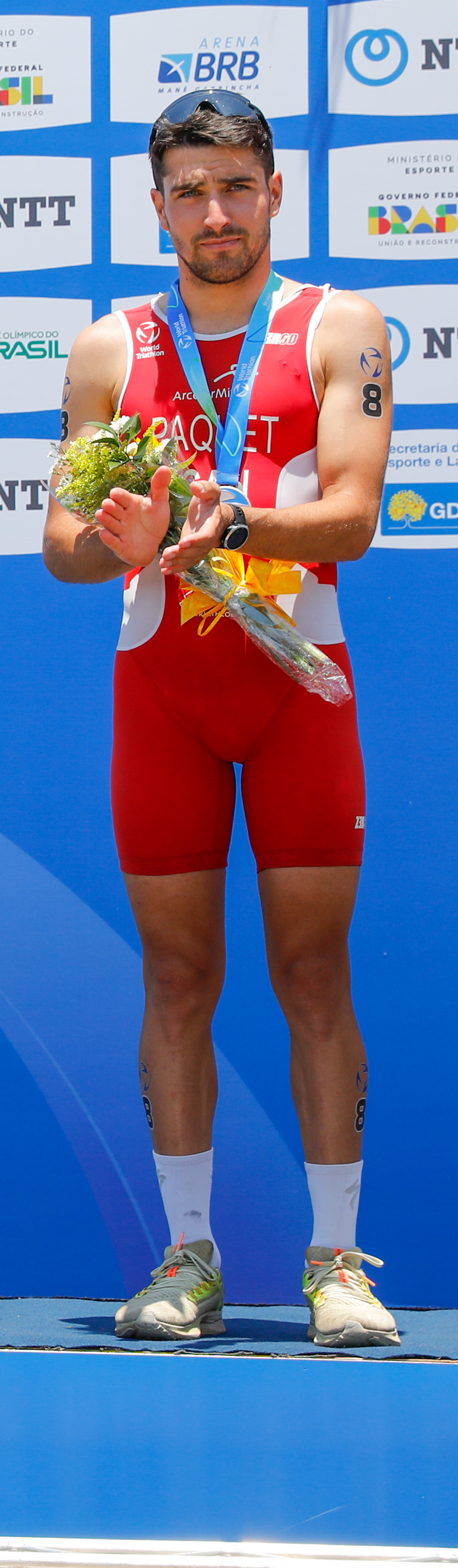
- Charles Paquet in 2023

Personal information
- Born: July 12, 1997 (age 28) Sept-Îles, Quebec, Canada

Sport
- Sport: Triathlon
Medal record
Men's Triathlon
Representing Canada
Pan American Games
Silver medal – second place	2019 Lima	Mixed relay

Charles Paquet (born July 12, 1997) is a Canadian triathlete. Paquet was born in Sept-Îles, Quebec and has represented Canada at multiple major events such as the Youth Olympics and Pan American Games.

== Career ==
Paquet first represented Canada at the 2014 Summer Youth Olympics, where he finished in ninth place. At the 2019 Pan American Games, Paquet was part of the silver medal-winning mixed relay team.

During the 2023 World Triathlon Championship Series, Paquet finished 7th at the stop in Montreal and in 24th place in the series final in Spain.

During the 2024 season, Paquet had multiple strong results. Paquet finished fifth in Yokohama and seventh in Cagliari as part of the 2024 World Triathlon Championship Series. Paquet's fifth-place finish was his personal best finish at a World Championship Series event. In June 2024, Paquet qualified to compete for Canada at the 2024 Summer Olympics.

== Personal life ==
Paquet's parents are Claude Paquet and Claudia Dupuis and he has one brother.
