= Bárbara Riveros =

Chilean triathlete (born 1987)

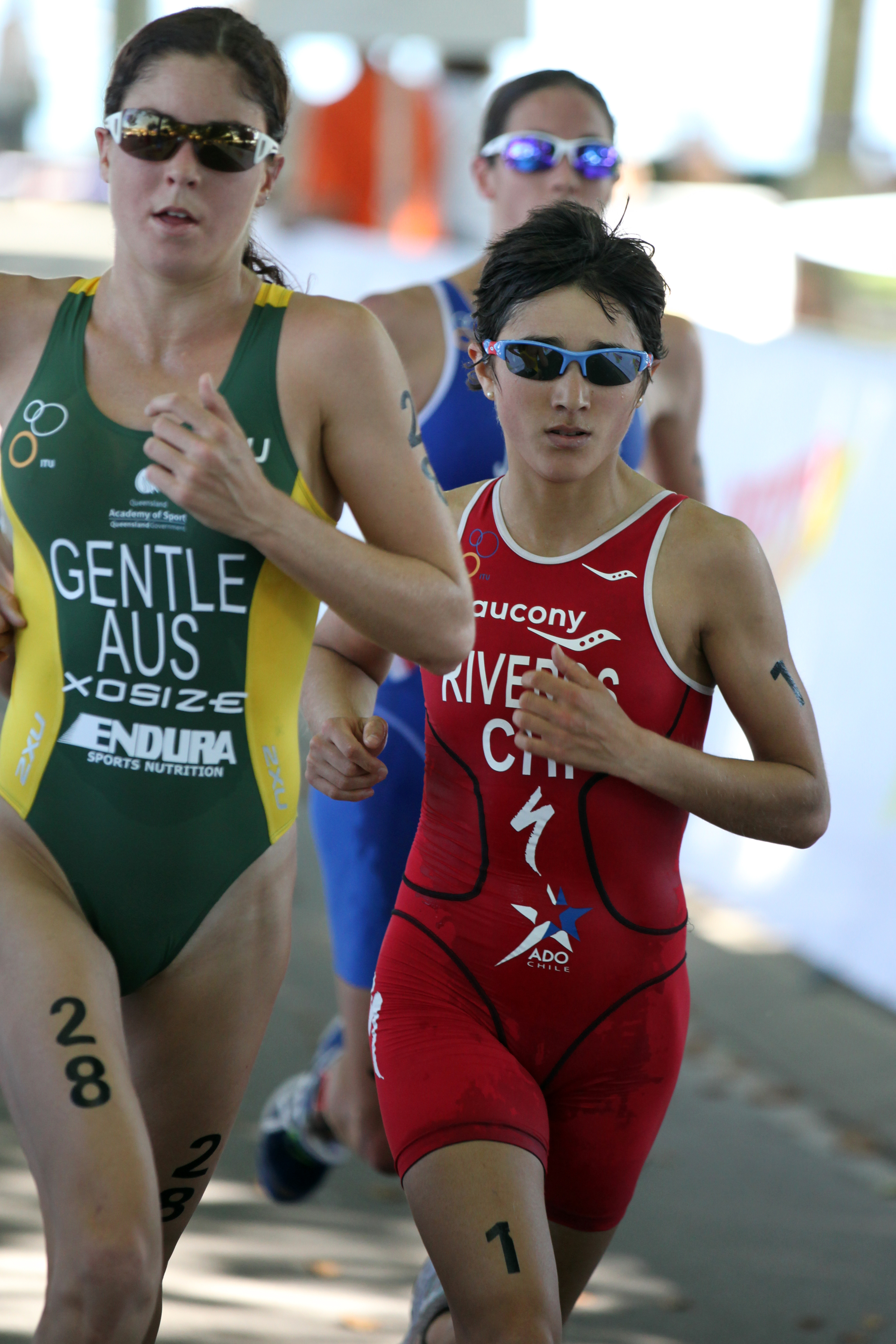
- Riveros at Lausanne, 2011

Personal information
- Born: Bárbara Catalina Riveros Díaz; 3 August 1987 (age 38) Santiago, Chile
- Height: 1.57 m (5 ft 2 in)
- Weight: 46 kg (101 lb)

Sport
- Country: Chile
- Sport: Triathlon
- Club: Universidad de Chile
Medal record
Women's Triathlon
Representing Chile
Long Distance World Championships
Silver medal – second place	2018 Fyn	Individual
Pan American Games
Gold medal – first place	2015 Toronto	Individual
Silver medal – second place	2011 Guadalajara	Individual
South American Games
Gold medal – first place	2014 Santiago	Individual
Gold medal – first place	2018 Cochabamba	Individual

Bárbara Catalina Riveros Díaz (Note: In this Spanish name, the first or paternal surname is Riveros and the second or maternal family name is Díaz.) (born 3 August 1987 in Santiago de Chile) is a Chilean professional triathlete, 2008, 2012, 2016, and 2020 Olympian. She was the ITU (now World Triathlon) World Sprint Distance Champion in 2012.

In France, Bárbara Riveros takes part in the prestigious Club Championship Series Lyonnaise des Eaux. In 2011, Riveros represents Tri Val de Grey and won the opening triathlon in Nice (24 April 2011), and she placed third at the second Grand Prix triathlon in Dunkirk (22 May 2011) behind Andrea Hewitt and Emma Moffatt.

In Chile, Bárbara Riveros represents the Club Deportivo Universidad Católica and studies Nutrition at the Universidad de Chile.

Her coach was Jamie Turner up to 2010 when he was employed by the Australian NSWIS. Her present coach is Darren Smith. Bárbara Riveros' father, Agustín Riveros, is a physician and brought Bárbara into contact with sports in early childhood.

== ITU competitions ==
In the nine years from 2002 to 2010, Bárbara Riveros took part in 47 ITU events and achieved 27 top ten positions. Riveros started the season 2011 with four medals, among which the silver medal at the World Championship Series triathlon in Sydney and the gold medal at the World Cup triathlon in Ishigaki.

The following list is based upon the official ITU rankings and the ITU Athletes's Profile Page. Unless indicated otherwise, the following events are triathlons (Olympic Distance) and refer to the Elite category.

Date	Competition	Place	Rank
2002-11-09	World Championships (Junior)	Cancun	45
2005-09-10	World Championships (Junior)	Gamagori	9
2006-01-07	Pan American Cup	Viña del Mar	1
2006-01-22	Pan American Cup	La Paz	1
2006-09-02	World Championships (Junior)	Lausanne	41
2006-11-19	ODESUR Games	Buenos Aires	3
2007-01-21	Pan American Cup	La Paz	1
2007-01-28	Pan American Cup	Villarrica	3
2007-03-17	Pan American Cup / South American Championships	Salinas	3
2007-03-25	Pan American Cup	Lima	2
2007-04-22	Pan American Cup	Buenos Aires	2
2007-05-12	Pan American Championships (U23)	Ixtapa	1
2007-05-12	Pan American Cup	Ixtapa	5
2007-06-10	BG World Cup	Vancouver	DNF
2007-07-15	Pan American Games	Rio de Janeiro	8
2007-08-11	BG World Cup	Tiszaújváros	50
2007-08-30	BG World Championships (U23)	Hamburg	17
2007-11-04	BG World Cup	Cancun	DNF
2008-01-06	Premium Pan American Cup	Viña del Mar	2
2008-01-13	Pan American Cup	La Paz	2
2008-03-14	Pan American Cup	Salinas	2
2008-04-06	Pan American Cup	Lima	1
2008-04-19	Pan American Championship	Mazatlan	4
2008-04-19	Pan American Championships (U23)	Mazatlan	1
2008-05-02	Pan American Cup	Roatan	1
2008-06-05	BG World Championships (U23)	Vancouver	5
2008-06-22	World Cup	Hy-Vee	17
2008-08-18	Olympic Games	Beijing	25
2009-03-01	Oceania Championships	Gold Coast	3
2009-03-29	World Cup	Mooloolaba	16
2009-04-05	Oceania Cup	New Plymouth	DNF
2009-05-02	Dextro Energy World Championship Series	Tongyeong	18
2009-05-31	Dextro Energy World Championship Series	Madrid	20
2009-06-21	Dextro Energy World Championship Series	Washington DC	16
2009-06-27	Elite Cup	Hy-Vee	11
2009-07-25	Dextro Energy World Championship Series	Hamburg	5
2009-08-15	Dextro Energy World Championship Series	London	40
2009-09-09	Dextro Energy World Championship Series, Grand Final	Gold Coast	35
2010-03-26	ODESUR South American Games	Guatape	1
2010-03-26	ODESUR South American Games (Sprint)	Guatape	1
2010-04-11	Dextro Energy World Championship Series	Sydney	1
2010-05-08	Dextro Energy World Championship Series	Seoul	2
2010-06-05	Dextro Energy World Championship Series	Madrid	6
2010-06-12	Elite Cup	Hy-Vee	13
2010-07-24	Dextro Energy World Championship Series	London	22
2010-08-14	Dextro Energy World Championship Series	Kitzbuhel	32
2010-09-08	Dextro Energy World Championship Series, Grand Final	Budapest	21
2011-01-15	Sprint Oceania Cup / Sprint Oceania Championships	Devonport	2
2011-03-26	World Cup	Mooloolaba	3
2011-04-09	Dextro Energy World Championship Series	Sydney	2
2011-04-17	World Cup	Ishigaki	1
2011-06-04	Dextro Energy World Championship Series	Madrid	5
2011-06-18	Dextro Energy World Championship Series	Kitzbuhel	5
2011-07-17	Dextro Energy World Championship Series	Hamburg	5
2011-08-06	Dextro Energy World Championship Series	London	12
2011-08-20	Dextro Energy World Championship Series, Sprint World Championships	Lausanne	1

BG = the sponsor British Gas · DNF = did not finish · DNS = did not start
