= Luisa Baptista =

Brazilian triathlete (born 1994)

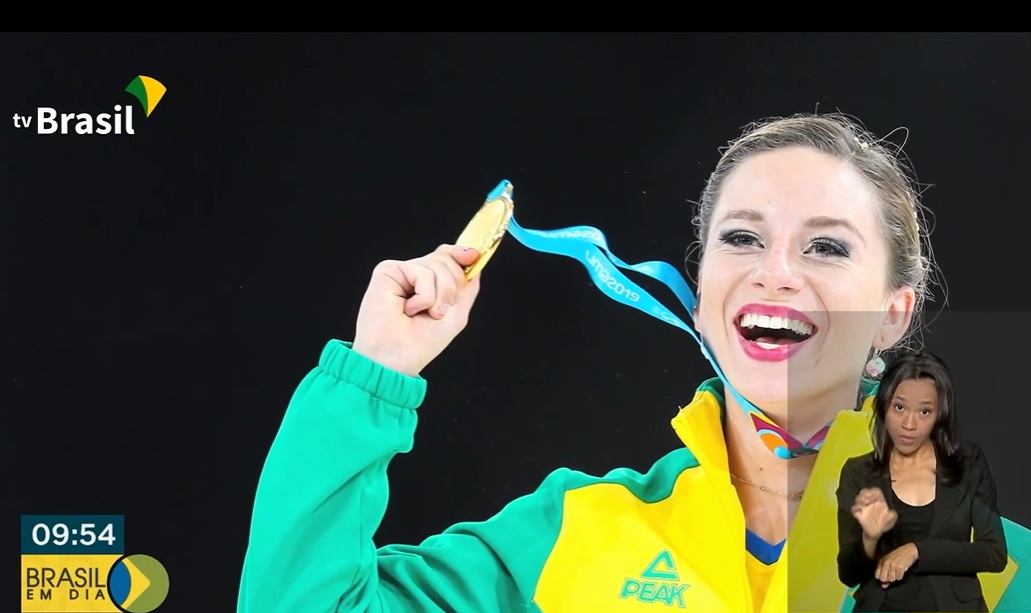

Personal information
- Full name: Luísa de Baptista Bastos Duarte
- Born: 15 June 1994 (age 32) Araras, Brazil

Sport
- Country: Brazil
- Sport: Triathlon
Medal record
Women's triathlon
Representing Brazil
Pan American Games
Gold medal – first place	2019 Lima	Women
Gold medal – first place	2019 Lima	Mixed relay

Luisa Baptista (born 15 June 1994) is a Brazilian triathlete. She won the gold medal in the women's triathlon at the 2019 Pan American Games. She also won the gold medal in the mixed relay event together with Vittória Lopes, Kaue Willy and Manoel Messias.

In 2015, she competed in the women's triathlon at the Pan American Games held in Toronto, Canada without winning a medal.

She represented Brazil in the women's event at the 2020 Summer Olympics in Tokyo, Japan.
