= Crisanto Grajales =

Mexican triathlete (born 1987)

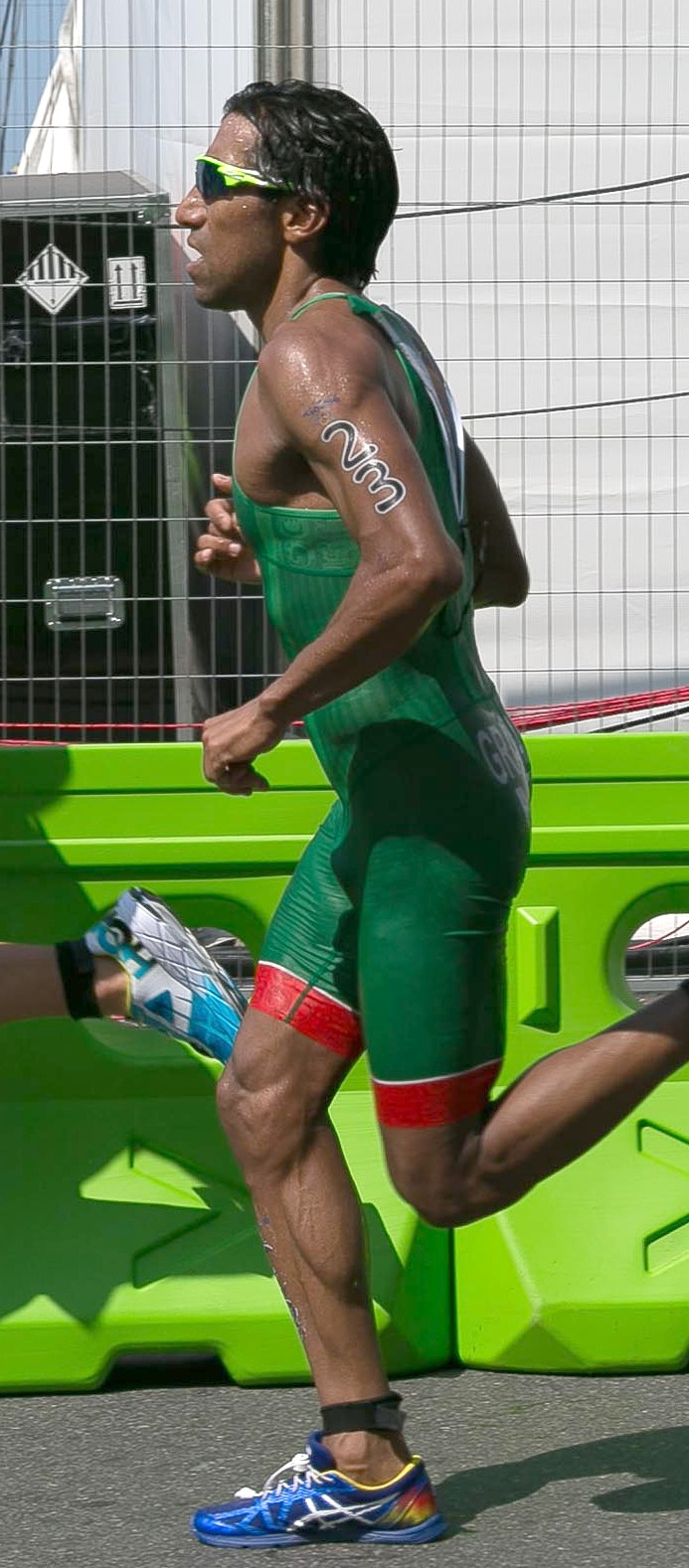
- Grajales at the 2016 Olympics

Personal information
- Full name: Crisanto Grajales Valencia
- Born: 6 May 1987 (age 39) Xalapa, Veracruz, Mexico
- Height: 166 cm (5 ft 5 in)
- Weight: 60 kg (132 lb)

Sport
- Sport: Triathlon
- Coached by: Eugenio Chimal
Medal record
Representing Mexico
Pan American Games
Gold medal – first place	2015 Toronto	Individual
Gold medal – first place	2019 Lima	Individual
Bronze medal – third place	2019 Lima	Mixed relay
Bronze medal – third place	2023 Santiago	Individual
Central American and Caribbean Games
Gold medal – first place	2014 Veracruz	Individual
Silver medal – second place	2010 Mayagüez	Individual

Crisanto Grajales Valencia (Note: In this Spanish name, the first or paternal surname is Grajales and the second or maternal family name is Valencia.) (born 6 May 1987) is a Mexican triathlete who won gold medals at the 2014 Central American and Caribbean Games and 2015 Pan American Games. He placed 28th at the 2012 Olympics and 12th at the 2016 Rio Games.

Grajales took up triathlon aged nine. He served as the flag bearer for Mexico at the 2011 Pan American Games and won the Mexican National Sports Award in 2015.

He won the gold medal in the men's triathlon at the 2019 Pan American Games held in Lima, Peru. He also won the bronze medal in the mixed relay event.

In 2021, he competed in the men's triathlon at the 2020 Summer Olympics held in Tokyo, Japan.
