= Luciano Taccone =

Argentine triathlete (born 1989)

Personal information
- Born: 29 May 1989 (age 37)

Sport
- Sport: Triathlon
Medal record
Representing Argentina
Pan American Games
Bronze medal – third place	2019 Lima	Individual

Luciano Taccone (born 29 May 1989) is an Argentine triathlete. He competed in the men's event at the 2016 Summer Olympics.
