= Cecilia Pérez (triathlete) =

Mexican triathlete (born 1991)

Personal information
- Full name: Cecilia Gabriela Pérez Flores
- National team: Mexico
- Born: 1 November 1991 (age 34) Guadalajara, Mexico
- Height: 1.65 m (5 ft 5 in)
- Weight: 59 kg (130 lb)

Sport
- Event: triathlon
Medal record
Representing Mexico
Pan American Games
Bronze medal – third place	2019 Lima	Individual
Bronze medal – third place	2019 Lima	Mixed relay
- Updated on 15 August 2016

Cecilia Gabriela Pérez Flores (Note: In this Spanish name, the first or paternal surname is Pérez and the second or maternal family name is Flores.) (born 1 November 1991) is a Mexican triathlete.

She qualified for the 2016 Olympics. Her presence helped establish a Mexican record for qualifier in triathlon at the Olympics. She later qualified for the 2020 Olympics, and she finished 33rd.
