= Irving Pérez =

Mexican triathlete (born 1986)

Personal information
- Full name: Irving Adrián Pérez Pineda
- Born: 16 May 1986 (age 40) Jojutla, Morelos
- Height: 175 cm (5 ft 9 in)

Sport
- Sport: Triathlon
Medal record
Representing Mexico
Pan American Games
Bronze medal – third place	2015 Toronto	Individual
Bronze medal – third place	2019 Lima	Mixed relay

Irving Adrián Pérez Pineda (Note: In this Spanish name, the first or paternal surname is Pérez and the second or maternal family name is Pineda.) (born 16 May 1986) is a Mexican triathlete. He competed in the men's event at the 2016 Summer Olympics held in Rio de Janeiro, Brazil. In 2021, he competed in the men's triathlon at the 2020 Summer Olympics held in Tokyo, Japan.

== See also ==
- List of people from Morelos
