= World Triathlon Multisports Championships =

Annual international multisports competition organized by World Triathlon

- Status: Active
- Genre: Multisports (Triathlon, Duathlon, Aquathlon, Aquabike)
- Date: Varies (typically May–November)
- Frequency: Annual
- Venue: Varies by edition
- Location: International
- Years active: 2017–present
- Founded: August 18, 2017
- Founder: World Triathlon (formerly International Triathlon Union)
- Previous event: 2025 Pontevedra
- Next event: 2027 Hamburg
- Organiser: World Triathlon
- Website: triathlon.org
- 2026 Abu Dhabi

The World Triathlon Multisports Championships (formerly the ITU Multisports World Championships) is an annual international multisport festival organised by World Triathlon (previously the International Triathlon Union). Held over a nine- to ten-day schedule, the event brings together multiple non-Olympic world championship disciplines, including duathlon, cross triathlon, cross duathlon, aquathlon, long-distance triathlon, and aquabike, into a single host city.

== History and background ==
Prior to 2017, the International Triathlon Union (ITU) staged world championships for its non-Olympic endurance disciplines as standalone events hosted in different cities throughout the racing calendar. In order to create a flagship festival atmosphere, increase media and commercial visibility, and allow elite, para, and age-group athletes to contest multiple world titles during a single international trip, the governing body decided to consolidate these events into a unified championship festival.

The inaugural edition took place from 18 to 27 August 2017 in Penticton, British Columbia, Canada, a venue selected for its long history of hosting endurance competitions, including three decades of Ironman Canada. The debut festival featured five separate championship disciplines and marked the introduction of long distance aquabike as an official ITU World Championship event.

Following successful single-city editions in Fyn (2018) and Pontevedra (2019), the 2020 championships were cancelled due to the COVID-19 pandemic. Pandemic-related travel and scheduling disruptions led to the 2021 and 2022 editions being split across multiple European host cities before returning to a unified single-city format in Ibiza in 2023.

== Disciplines ==
The championship programme currently encompasses six core non-Olympic disciplines contested across elite, under-23, junior, paratriathlon, and age-group categories:

- Duathlon: Run–bike–run format contested over sprint and standard distances, alongside mixed relay events.
- Cross triathlon: Off-road swim, mountain bike, and trail run.
- Cross duathlon: Off-road trail run, mountain bike, and trail run (added to the unified festival schedule following the inaugural edition).
- Aquathlon: Continuous run-swim–run race format.
- Long-distance triathlon: Extended swim–bike–run format (typically 3 km swim, 120 km bike, and 30 km run).
- Aquabike: Long-distance swim–bike event without a running leg, contested primarily as an age-group and open world championship.

== Editions ==
Edition	Year	Host city	Country	Dates	Notes
1	2017	Penticton	Canada	18–27 August	Inaugural edition; debut of Aquabike World Championships.
2	2018	Fyn	Denmark	6–14 July	Held across Odense, Middelfart, and Svendborg. First European edition.
3	2019	Pontevedra	Spain	27 April – 4 May	First edition hosted in Spain.
—	2020	Almere	Netherlands	—	Cancelled due to the COVID-19 pandemic.
4	2021	Almere; Avilés; El Anillo	Netherlands; Spain; Spain	September–October	Split across three venues due to COVID-19 restrictions.
5	2022	Târgu Mureș; Šamorín	Romania; Slovakia	June–August	Split across two venues (cross/duathlon in Romania; aquathlon/long-distance in Slovakia).
6	2023	Ibiza	Spain	29 April – 7 May	Return to a single-city unified festival.
7	2024	Townsville	Australia	15–25 August	First edition held in Oceania.
8	2025	Pontevedra	Spain	20–29 June	First city to host the unified festival twice.
9	2026	Abu Dhabi	United Arab Emirates	13–22 November	Hosted on Hudayriyat Island. First Asian edition.
10	2027	Edmonton	Canada	16–25 July	As currently scheduled.

== 2017 inaugural champions ==
At the inaugural 2017 championships in Penticton, elite world titles were awarded in four disciplines:

Discipline	Men's Elite Champion	Women's Elite Champion
Duathlon	Benoît Nicolas (FRA)	Felicity Sheedy-Ryan (AUS)
Cross Triathlon	Francisco Serrano (MEX)	Melanie McQuaid (CAN)
Aquathlon	Matthew Sharpe (CAN)	Emma Pallant (GBR)
Long Distance Triathlon	Lionel Sanders (CAN)	Sarah Crowley (AUS)

== See also ==
- World Triathlon Championship Series
- World Triathlon Long Distance Championships
- World Triathlon Duathlon Championships
- World Triathlon Aquathlon Championships
- World Triathlon Cross Championships
