= World Triathlon Cross Championships =

Championship competition

The World Triathlon Cross Championships is a triathlon championship competition organised by World Triathlon. The competition has been held annually since 2011. Unlike normal triathlon races the cross triathlon (or X-tri) discipline is off-road over difficult terrain. The championship typically involves a 1 km swim, 20–30 km mountain bike and 6–10 km trail run.

== Venues ==
Year	Date	Location
2011	30 April	(Spain) Guijo de Granadilla
2012	16-19 May	(United States) Pelham
2013	13 July	(Netherlands) The Hague
2014	16 August	(Germany) Zittau
2015	26 September	(Italy) Cagliari
2016	19 November	(Australia) Snowy Mountains
2017	23 August	(Canada) Penticton
2018	10 July	(Denmark) Fyn
2019	30 April	(Spain) Pontevedra
2021	30–31 October	(Spain) Guijo de Granadilla
2022	8 June	(Romania) Târgu Mureș
2023	5 May	(Spain) Sant Antoni de Portmany
2024	20 August	(Australia) Townsville
2025	24 June	(Spain) Pontevedra
2026	17 November	(United Arab Emirates) Abu Dhabi

== Medallists ==
=== Men's ===
Year	Gold	Silver	Bronze
2011	Conrad Stoltz (RSA)	Seth Wealing (USA)	Olivier Marceau (SUI)
2012	Conrad Stoltz (RSA)	Craig Evans (USA)	Christopher Legh (AUS)
2013	Conrad Stoltz (RSA)	Rubén Ruzafa (ESP)	Brice Daubord (FRA)
2014	Rubén Ruzafa (ESP)	Josiah Middaugh (USA)	Braden Currie (NZL)
2015	Rubén Ruzafa (ESP)	Francisco Serrano (MEX)	Sam Osborne (NZL)
2016	Rubén Ruzafa (ESP)	Josiah Middaugh (USA)	Braden Currie (NZL)
2017	Francisco Serrano (MEX)	Rubén Ruzafa (ESP)	Kyle Smith (NZL)
2018	Rubén Ruzafa (ESP)	Sam Osborne (NZL)	Brice Daubord (FRA)
2019	Arthur Forissier (FRA)	Rubén Ruzafa (ESP)	Lukáš Kočař (CZE)
2021	Arthur Serrières (FRA)	Arthur Forissier (FRA)	Rubén Ruzafa (ESP)
2022	Arthur Serrières (FRA)	Félix Forissier (FRA)	Arthur Forissier (FRA)
2023	Félix Forissier (FRA)	Lukáš Kočař (CZE)	Arthur Forissier (FRA)
2024	Michele Bonacina (ITA)	Sam Osborne (NZL)	Benjamin Forbes (AUS)
2025	Félix Forissier (FRA)	Arthur Serrières (FRA)	Kevin Viñuela (ESP)
2026	Keller Norland (USA)	Eneko de Castro (ESP)	Kevin Viñuela (ESP)

=== Women's ===
Year	Gold	Silver	Bronze
2011	Mélanie McQuaid (CAN)	Shonny Vanlandingham (USA)	Emma Garrard (USA)
2012	Lesley Paterson (GBR)	Mélanie McQuaid (CAN)	Carla Van Huysteen (RSA)
2013	Helena Erbenová (CZE)	Lesley Paterson (GBR)	Chantell Widney (CAN)
2014	Kathrin Müller (GER)	Flora Duffy (BER)	Helena Erbenová (CZE)
2015	Flora Duffy (BER)	Bárbara Riveros (CHI)	Brigitta Poór (HUN)
2016	Flora Duffy (BER)	Bárbara Riveros (CHI)	Suzanne Snyder (USA)
2017	Mélanie McQuaid (CAN)	Jacqueline Slack (GBR)	Ladina Buss (SUI)
2018	Lesley Paterson (GBR)	Nicole Walters (GBR)	Eleonora Peroncini (ITA)
2019	Eleonora Peroncini (ITA)	Jacqueline Slack (GBR)	Nicole Walters (GBR)
2021	Loanne Duvoisin (SUI)	Sandra Mairhofer (ITA)	Aneta Grabmüllerová (CZE)
2022	Sandra Mairhofer (ITA)	Marta Menditto (ITA)	Solenne Billouin (FRA)
2023	Sandra Mairhofer (ITA)	Loanne Duvoisin (SUI)	Alizée Paties (FRA)
2024	Marta Menditto (ITA)	Romy Spoelder (NED)	Maeve Kennedy (AUS)
2025	Alizée Paties (FRA)	Marina Muñoz (ESP)	Bárbara Riveros (CHL)
2026	Marina Muñoz (ESP)	Alizée Paties (FRA)	Hanna Maksimava (BLR)

=== Medal table ===
Rank	Nation	Gold	Silver	Bronze	Total
1	France	6	4	6	16
2	Spain	5	5	3	13
3	Italy	5	2	1	8
4	South Africa	3	0	1	4
5	United Kingdom	2	4	1	7
6	Canada	2	1	1	4
7	Bermuda	2	1	0	3
8	United States	1	5	2	8
9	Czech Republic	1	1	3	5
10	Switzerland	1	1	2	4
11	Mexico	1	1	0	2
12	Germany	1	0	0	1
13	New Zealand	0	2	4	6
14	Chile	0	2	0	2
15	Netherlands	0	1	0	1
16	Australia	0	0	3	3
17	Belarus	0	0	1	1
17	Chile	0	0	1	1
17	Hungary	0	0	1	1
Totals (19 entries)		30	30	30	90
