= 2022 World Triathlon Long Distance Championships =

International sports competition

Long Distance Triathlon at the World Triathlon Multisports Championships
- Location: Šamorín, Spain
- Date: 21 August 2022

The 2022 World Triathlon Long Distance Championships was a triathlon competition held in Šamorín in Slovakia on 21 August 2022 and organized by World Triathlon. The Elite races for men and consisted of a 2 km (1.2 mi) swim, 79.8 km (49.6 mi) bike and 17.9 km (11.1 mi) run, longer than the standard 1.5 km swim, 40 km bike and 10 km run associated with the World Triathlon Championship Series and the Olympic Games, but shorter than the classic Ironman Triathlon event. The route, totalling 99.7 km (62.0 mi) is the shortest in the history of the event, and an unusually high number of Olympic-distance athletes elected to participate.

The championship was held as part of the 2022 World Triathlon Multi-sports Championships which crowned several world champions in non Olympic distance events governed by World Triathlon.

== Medal Summary ==
Event	Gold		Silver		Bronze	
Men	Pierre Le Corre; France	3:11:15	Florian Angert; Germany	3:13.29	Frederic Funk; Germany	3:15.40
Women	Lucy Charles-Barclay; Great Britain	3:34:17	Emma Pallant; Great Britain	3:27:39	Sarissa De Vries; Netherlands	3:39.26

== Results ==
The following are the results of the elite races:

=== Men ===
33 Athletes took the start line of which 29 completed the course. Pierre Le Corre of France led the men home to win the world title, two minutes and 14 seconds ahead of German Florian Angert.

Rank	Athlete	Swim	T1	Bike	T2	Run	Time
1st place, gold medalist(s)	Pierre Le Corre (FRA)	24:44	2:42	1:44:11	1:54	57:45	3:11:15
2nd place, silver medalist(s)	Florian Angert (GER)	25:12	2:51	1:42:26	2:07	1:00:56	3:13:29
3rd place, bronze medalist(s)	Frederic Funk (GER)	26:21	2:52	1:42:22	2:17	1:01:50	3:15:40
4	Gregory Barnaby (ITA)	26:19	2:58	1:44:36	2:06	1:00:24	3:16:21
5	Clement Mignon (FRA)	27:05	2:49	1:44:02	2:11	1:01:46	3:17:53
6	Christophe De Keyser (BEL)	25:26	2:39	1:45:50	2:03	1:02:07	3:18:02
7	Denis Chevrot (FRA)	26:13	2:40	1:48:30	2:23	59:30	3:19:14
8	Robert Kallin (SWE)	27:03	3:06	1:43:43	2:20	1:03:25	3:19:35
9	Jamie Riddle (RSA)	24:43	2:50	1:49:51	2:26	1:02:11	3:21:58
10	Ondrej Kubo (SVK)	28:59	2:38	1:45:41	2:20	1:02:56	3:22:33
11	Paul Ruttmann (AUT)	32:19	3:10	1:43:55	2:09	1:01:10	3:22:41
12	Lukas Kocar (CZE)	27:08	3:04	1:47:33	2:16	1:02:52	3:22:52
13	Andrew Starykowicz (USA)	27:02	3:00	1:43:46	2:27	1:07:00	3:23:13
14	Tomasz Brembor (POL)	26:17	2:58	1:50:10	1:52	1:03:24	3:24:40
15	Thomas Steger (AUT)	29:56	2:58	1:48:00	2:28	1:03:23	3:26:42
16	Andrea Pizzeghella (ITA)	28:58	2:40	1:51:43	1:55	1:02:21	3:27:36
17	Julian Erhardt (GER)	28:53	2:42	1:51:50	2:25	1:02:44	3:28:34
18	Milan Brons (NED)	27:06	2:59	1:47:46	2:45	1:08:27	3:29:02
19	Ramon Bustos (CHI)	27:01	2:54	1:53:38	2:40	1:03:40	3:29:51
20	Alexander Mundt (DEN)	25:23	2:48	1:51:11	2:31	1:08:03	3:29:53
21	Marcin Lawicki (POL)	29:00	2:35	1:51:49	2:15	1:05:10	3:30:47
22	Jack Shayler (GBR)	26:56	2:37	1:55:15	2:28	1:03:54	3:31:10
23	Zoltán Petsuk (HUN)	26:51	2:31	1:55:19	2:20	1:06:05	3:33:04
24	Sergiy Kurochkin (UKR)	25:28	2:33	1:55:31	2:23	1:09:24	3:35:17
25	Emmanuel Lejeune (BEL)	26:16	2:41	2:02:34	3:02	1:02:02	3:36:32
26	Mattia Ceccarelli (ITA)	25:36	2:44	2:01:53	2:56	1:03:46	3:36:53
27	Andrei Vrabii (MDA)	36:27	3:13	1:57:26	2:11	1:09:16	3:48:31
28	Thomas Roos (USA)	27:07	3:19	2:03:23	2:44	1:13:41	3:50:12
29	Ivan Trpchevski (MKD)	27:03	3:00	2:06:19	2:51	1:23:23	4:02:33
—	Ognjen Stojanovic (SRB)	25:48	3:32	1:54:17	2:19	—	DNF
—	Pablo Dapena Gonzalez (ESP)	25:42	2:37	1:51:05	2:17	—	DNF
—	Tim Reed (AUS)	27:00	2:54	2:33:59	—	—	DNF
—	Oliver Gorges (LUX)	27:06	3:04	—	—	—	DNF
Key : DNF - did not finish ; DNS - did not start

=== Women ===
17 athletes took to the course, of which 16 completed the race. British star Lucy Charles-Barclay, returning from injury, led home a British one-two ahead of compatriot Emma Pallant, winning by three minutes and 12 seconds.

Rank	Athlete	Swim	T1	Bike	T2	Run	Time
1st place, gold medalist(s)	Lucy Charles-Barclay (GBR)	26:12	2:42	1:58:10	2:08	1:05:05	3:34:17
2nd place, silver medalist(s)	Emma Pallant (GBR)	30:41	2:33	1:56:49	2:07	1:05:21	3:37:29
3rd place, bronze medalist(s)	Sarissa de Vries (NED)	27:53	2:43	1:56:33	2:18	1:10:01	3:39:26
4	Grace Thek (AUS)	27:55	2:39	1:59:40	2:13	1:07:16	3:39:42
5	Luisa Baptista (BRA)	27:52	2:34	2:04:20	2:08	1:04:09	3:41:02
6	Marjolaine Pierre (FRA)	30:38	2:51	1:56:32	2:20	1:10:50	3:43:10
7	Rebecca Clarke (NZL)	27:17	2:57	1:59:56	2:24	1:11:59	3:44:31
8	Manon Genet (FRA)	31:26	3:00	2:00:12	2:19	1:10:02	3:46:57
9	Giorgia Priarone (ITA)	31:14	3:09	2:02:40	2:18	1:07:50	3:47:10
10	Alexia Bailly (FRA)	30:38	2:53	2:01:08	2:04	1:10:29	3:47:10
11	Margie Santimaria (ITA)	27:55	2:48	2:03:33	2:17	1:17:36	3:54:08
12	Marta Bernardi (ITA)	31:49	3:04	2:07:21	2:19	1:10:42	3:55:13
13	Liliia Baranovska (UKR)	30:50	2:49	2:06:41	2:21	1:13:11	3:55:50
14	Gabriella Zelinka (HUN)	32:31	2:47	2:06:58	2:34	1:14:03	3:58:51
15	Maria Czesnik (POL)	30:45	3:23	2:11:59	2:43	1:14:04	4:02:53
16	Natalia Rypel (POL)	30:47	2:40	2:12:35	2:21	1:19:41	4:08:02
-	Lisa Norden (SWE)	28:25	3:25	2:00:19	-	-	DNF
Key : DNF - did not finish ; DNS - did not start

== Para triathlon and Age grade ==
In addition to the elite races, a selection of para triathlon championships, and age grade championship races were also held at Samorin. The winners of these races are listed below:

Classification		Men			Women		
Classification		Athlete	Nation	Time	Athlete	Nation	Time
Para triathlon	PTS4	Martin Falch	Austria	5:26:43			
Para triathlon	PTS5	Péter Boronkay	Hungary	4:11:45			
Para triathlon	PTVI	Zhalaldin Abduvaliev (B1)	Kyrgyzstan	5:29:38			
Age-grade	20-24 AG	Erik Kollár	Hungary	3:47:34	Louisa Marie Middleditch	Singapore	4:28:35
Age-grade	25-29 AG	José Cabeça	Portugal	3:35:22	Heather Neill	New Zealand	4:21:34
Age-grade	30-34 AG	Matt Kerr	New Zealand	3:37:29	Sophie Walker Meers	Great Britain	4:34:51
Age-grade	35-39 AG	Marco Viappiani	Italy	3:47:57	Martina Krajhanzlova	Slovakia	4:42:59
Age-grade	40-44 AG	Stefan Leitner	Austria	3:48:59	Tanja Kompan	Slovenia	4:30:16
Age-grade	45-49 AG	Philipp Strolz	Austria	3:52:12	Constance Mochar	Austria	4:17:01
Age-grade	50-54 AG	Pete Eggleston	Great Britain	3:57:53	Kai Sachtleber	Germany	4:26:37
Age-grade	55-59 AG	Graham Baxter	Great Britain	4:00:31	Gabriele Pauer	Austria	5:00:06
Age-grade	60-64 AG	Thomas Geiger	Germany	4:20:12	Barbara Holmes	Great Britain	4:54:55
Age-grade	65-69 AG	Jürgen Balg	Germany	4:24:45	Jane Neal	Great Britain	5:39:30
Age-grade	70-74 AG	Mike Wien	United States	5:16:19	Suzanne Mink	United States	6:38:41
Age-grade	75-79 AG	Richard File	Great Britain	5:36:25			
