= 2021 World Triathlon Cross Championships =

Cross Triathlon World Championships

- Location: Guijo de Granadilla, Spain
- Dates: 29-31 October

Champions
- Men: Arthur Serrieres (FRA)
- Women: Loanne Duvoisin (SUI)

The 2021 World Triathlon Cross Championships was the 10th edition of the World Triathlon Cross Championships organized by World Triathlon. It was held in Guijo de Granadilla, Spain, from 29 to 31 October 2021. Medals were awarded in Elite, Under-23, Junior, Group age and Para-Cross triathlon. World Triathlon organized the 2021 Aquathlon World Championships in the same date and venue. It was the 3rd edition on Spanish soil and second on El Anillo circuit. The race included a 1 km (0.62 mi) swim, 21 km (13 mi) mountain bike race and 6 km (3.7 mi) of trail running.

== Results ==
Swiss Loanne Duvoisin and French Arthur Serrieres lifted their first World Championship trophy in the Elite category. They both had strong bike and run legs to come up victorious

=== Men ===
Rank	Name	Swim	Bike	Run	Time
Elite
Gold medal	Arthur Serrieres (FRA)	12:55	47:20	21:15	1:23:43
Silver medal	Arthur Forissier (FRA)	13:51	47:30	21:24	1:24:50
Bronze medal	Ruben Ruzafa (ESP)	12:48	47:53	22:04	1:24:56
4	Lukas Kocar (CZE)				1:25:13
5	Theo Dupras (FRA)				1:25:37

=== Women ===
Rank	Name	Swim	Bike	Run	Time
Elite
Gold medal	Loanne Duvoisin (SUI)	15:10	54:21	25:18	1:37:42
Silver medal	Sandra Mairhofer (ITA)	14:07	55:44	27:01	1:39:35
Bronze medal	Aneta Grabmullerova (CZE)	14:08	56:44	28:06	1:41:27
4	Marta Menditto (ITA)				1:42:22
5	Michelle Flipo (MEX)				1:42:33
