= Conrad Stoltz =

South African triathlete

Personal information
- Full name: Conrad Willem Stoltz
- Nickname: The Caveman
- Born: 23 October 1973 (age 52) Lydenburg, South Africa
- Height: 1.9 m (6 ft 3 in)
- Weight: 82 kg (181 lb)

Sport
- Country: South Africa
- Team: Specialized
Medal record
Representing South Africa
ITU Cross Triathlon World Championship
Gold medal – first place	2013	World Champion
Gold medal – first place	2012	World Champion
Gold medal – first place	2011	World Champion
XTERRA World Championship
Gold medal – first place	2010	World Champion
Gold medal – first place	2007	World Champion
Gold medal – first place	2002	World Champion
Gold medal – first place	2001	World Champion

Conrad Willem Stoltz (born 23 October 1973) is a triathlete from South Africa. He is a four time XTERRA Triathlon World Champion and a three time ITU Cross Triathlon World Champion.

== Career ==
Stoltz was born in Lydenburg, South Africa and calls Stellenbosch, South Africa his hometown while he is based in Morgan Hill, California, when competing in the United States.

Stoltz started competing in the multi-sport disciplines of duathlon and triathlon through his involvement in cycling. He is most often competes in cross triathlon, such as the XTERRA series of off-road triathlons. He claimed the XTERRA World Championship in his rookie season in 2001 and successfully defended it 2002. He again won XTERRA World titles in 2007 and 2010 and has won three consecutive ITU Cross Triathlon World titles in 2011,2012 and 2013. In total, he has won 10 USA XTERRA Series titles and 52 XTERRA triathlons around the world.

At the 2000 Summer Olympics, in the triathlon event, he broke away on the bike leg, leading part of the race, before finishing 20th.

At the age of 40, Conrad finished 3rd at the South African Time Trial Championships (40 km road bike) in a time of 51:46.

After breaking his back in 3 places (30% compression fractures) and his wrist in 8 places near the end of the 2006 season, Stoltz bounced back and in the XTERRA USA Championship series by winning four of five races, including the USA Championship, (2007 US XTERRA Series champion) and winning the XTERRA World Championship.

== Results ==
=== XTERRA ===
- 4 x World Champion: 2001, 2002, 2007 and 2010.
- 10 x XTERRA USA Series champion
- Winner of the inaugural XTERRA South Africa (24 April 2005) Grabouw, South Africa.
- 52 XTERRA career wins to date. (August, 2013)
XTERRA results
- 2013 results:
  - 1st Total Sports Challenge 1st Mixed team with Liezel- Terra Firma, South Africa
  - 1st XTERRA Buffelspoort, South Africa
  - 2nd XTERRA Las Vegas, USA. (crashed & cut hand)
  - 1st XTERRA Brazil, Ilhabela.
  - 1st ITU Cross Triathlon World Champs, Den Haag, Holland.
  - 1st XTERRA Italy, Abruzzo.
  - 1st TriLanai, Lanai Hawaii
  - 1st Val De Vie MTB Challenge, Paarl, South Africa
  - 1st Origin of Trails MTB, Stellenbosch South Africa
- 2012 results:
  - 1st Total Sports Challenge 1st Mixed Team Terra Firma
  - 1st XTERRA Buffelspoort SA.
  - 1st West Coast Warm Water Weekend.
  - 1st XTERRA Grabouw SA.
  - 1st Vine a Vine MTB race.
  - 1st XTERRA Las Vegas
  - 10th Whiskey off-road MTB Prescott AZ
  - 1st ITU Cross Triathlon World Champs
  - 1st XTERRA Richmond
  - 5th 5150 New Orleans
  - 4th 5150 Boulder Peak
  - 1st XTERRA CO
  - 2nd Rev3 Maine
  - 3rd XTERRA USA Champs, Ogden Utah.
  - Winner of XTERRA USA Series
  - 3rd XTERRA World Champs. Maui Hawaii.
  - 1st TriLanai- Lanai- Hawaii.
  - Double Century- Coronation Mixed team of 12 riders- 7hr22. Swellendam, South Africa
- 2011 results:
  - 1st XTERRA Buffelspoort
  - 4th SA TT Champs
  - 1st Vine a Vinge MTB race
  - 2nd XTERRA Las Vegas (after taking wrong turn)
  - 1st XTERRA Waco, USA
  - 1st ITU Cross Triathlon World Champs, Spain
  - 1st XTERRA Santa Cruz
  - 1st XTERRA Alabama
  - 1st XTERRA Richmond
  - 1st XTERRA Knysna
  - 1st WP MTB Champs
  - 1st XTERRA Japan
  - 5th XTERRA USA Champs
  - XTERRA USA Series Champion

2010 results:

  - 1st XTERRA Buffelspoort
  - 1st Argus MTB race Boschendal
  - 1st XTERRA Las Vegas
  - 1st XTERRA Richmond
  - 1st XTERRA Alabama
  - 1st XTERRA USA Championships
  - XTERRA USA Series Champion
  - 1st XTERRA World Championships

2009 results:

  - 1st XTERRA West Cup – Las Vegas Lake (2 May 2009)
  - 1st XTERRA Midwest Cup – Michigan (17 May 2009)
  - 1st XTERRA Southeast Cup – Alabama (24 May 2009)
  - 5th XTERRA Northwest Cup – Idaho (6 June 2009) (puncture).
  - 1st XTERRA Atlantic Cup – Virginia (14 June 2009) cut foot and had surgery for infection
  - 3rd XTERRA Northeast Cup – Sugar bush (12 July 2009) 13 stitches still in foot
  - 2nd XTERRA USA Championship – Utah (27 September 2009)
  - Winner XTERRA USA Championship series
  - 5th XTERRA World Champs Maui, Hawaii (October 2009)
- 2008 results:
  - XTERRA West Championship, Temecula, California (17 May 2008) – 1st in a time of 2:23:02.
  - XTERRA Southeast Championship – Oak Mountain (8 June 2008) – 1st in a time of 2:05:58.
  - XTERRA UK Championship – South Wales (21 June 2008) – 2nd in a time of 2:48:37.
  - XTERRA Czech – (26 June 2008) – 6th in a time of 2:18:31.
  - XTERRA USA Championship – Nevada (5 October 2008) – 8th in a time of 2:40:17.
- 2005 results in US Points Series:
  - XTERRA West Championship, Temecula, California (15 May 2005) – 1st in a time of 2:07:59.
  - XTERRA East Championship, Richmond, Virginia (3 July 2005) – 1st in a time of 1:59:42.
  - XTERRA Midwest Championship, Milwaukee, Wisconsin (24 July 2005) – 1st in a time of 2:26:57.
  - XTERRA Mountain Championship, Keystone, Colorado (14 August 2005) – 2nd in a time of 2:09:42 behind Mike Vine.
  - XTERRA USA Championship, Incline Village, Nevada (2 October 2005) – 2nd in a time of 2:37:15 behind Eneko Llanos (Spain).

=== Olympic Games ===
- 2000 Summer Olympics, 20th place with a total time of 1:50:24.39.
- 2004 Summer Olympics, did not finish the race due to a mechanical failure.

=== National titles and representation ===
==== Junior athlete ====
- duathlon,
  - South African Junior Duathlon Champion in 1990 and 1991.
  - Participated in World Duathlon Championship in 1991 and 1992.
- triathlon,
  - South African Junior Triathlon Champion in 1991 and 1992.
  - Participated in World Triathlon Championship in 1993.

==== Senior athlete ====
- triathlon,
  - South African Triathlon Champion in 1994, 1995, 1997 and 1999.
  - African Triathlon Champion in 1993, 1995, 1998, 2000, 2001 and 2003.
  - Participated in World Triathlon Championship in 1996–2000 and 2002.
  - Participated in Olympics in;
    - 2000 Summer Olympics in Sydney, Australia and
    - 2004 Summer Olympics in Athens, Greece.

=== Cycling ===
- Sea Otter Classic 2009 Cross Country- 8th overall PRO Men

== Product design ==
Conrad has collaborated with Avia on Avi Stoltz off-road running shoe and on various products by Specialized.
