= Lesley Paterson =

Scottish triathlete and screenwriter

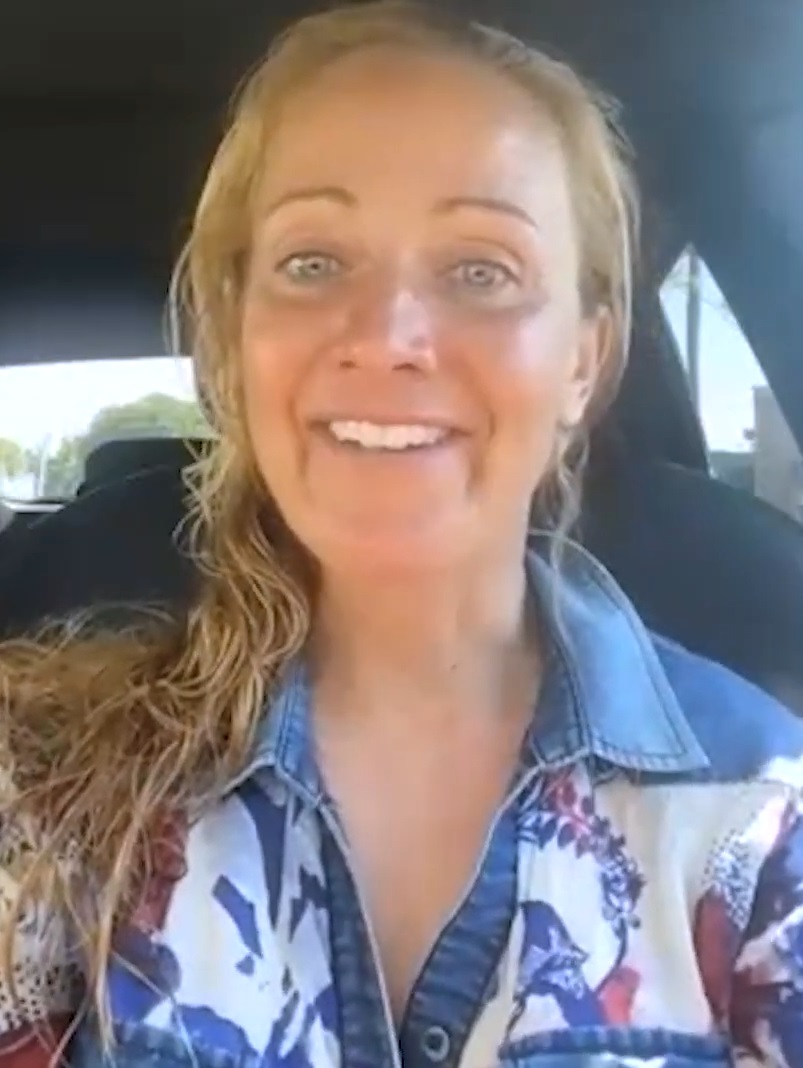
- Paterson in 2023

Personal information
- Nickname: The Scottish Rocket
- Nationality: Scottish
- Born: 12 October 1980 (age 45) Stirling, Scotland
- Education: Loughborough University; San Diego State University
- Height: 1.52 m (5 ft 0 in)
- Spouse: Simon Marshall
- Website: www.lesleypaterson.com

Sport
- Country: Scotland/Great Britain
Medal record
Representing Great Britain
Women's triathlon
XTERRA Triathlon World Championships
Gold medal – first place	2018	Elite
Gold medal – first place	2012	Elite
Gold medal – first place	2011	Elite
Silver medal – second place	2019	Elite
Silver medal – second place	2015	Elite
Silver medal – second place	2013	Elite
Silver medal – second place	2009	Elite
ITU Cross Triathlon World Championships
Gold medal – first place	2018	Elite
Gold medal – first place	2012	Elite
Silver medal – second place	2013	Elite
Women's duathlon
ITU Duathlon World Championships
Silver medal – second place	2000	Junior
Bronze medal – third place	1998	Junior

Lesley Paterson (born 12 October 1980) is a Scottish triathlete, author, screenwriter and film producer.

She won the 2011, 2012 and 2018 XTERRA Triathlon World Championships as well as the 2012 and 2018 editions of the World Triathlon Cross Championships.

She co-wrote, with Ian Stokell, a screenplay based on the anti-war novel All Quiet on the Western Front by Erich Maria Remarque, and in 2006 acquired an option on the film rights for the book. It was eventually produced as the 2022 epic film of the same name, distributed by Netflix. Paterson won the 2022 BAFTA Award for Best Adapted Screenplay, sharing it with Stokell and director Edward Berger.

== Early life and education ==
Paterson was born and grew up in Stirling, Scotland, the youngest of four children. Her father was a surveyor, and her mother a hotel manager. At the age of seven she began playing rugby in a boys' team at Stirling County Rugby Club — the only girl in the club among 250 boys. She also attended ballet classes. When no longer allowed to play rugby with boys, she began fell running. Her father, Alistair, introduced her to triathlon after helping to start Stirling Triathlon Club.

She chose to go to Loughborough University on the grounds that it would give her the best chance in triathlon. She studied English and drama as an undergraduate at Loughborough, and obtained a master's degree in theatre at San Diego State University.

== Triathlon career ==
Introduced to triathlon by her father at age 14, Paterson was a member of the Scottish and British triathlon squads by age 16. She won the Scottish Junior Championships in 1997, and finished 15th in the 1999 World Junior Triathlon Championships. In 2000, she won the silver medal at the World Junior Duathlon Championships, an event that does not require any swimming. However, she was having difficulty with the swimming part of triathlon:

I was putting in 15 to 20 hours a week in the pool and still not getting anywhere ... I'd come last out of the water and it would crush me. I was coming last as a result, so I began to give up on it. It got to the point where I hated it. The anxiety got the better of me and races were becoming a harrowing experience.

She had dreams of qualifying for the Olympics, but her poor swim performance made it impossible to do well in draft-legal races such as the ITU races needed to qualify for the Olympics. After failing to qualify for the 2002 Commonwealth Games, which she described as her "lowest moment", she decided to give up triathlon. Soon afterwards, she moved to San Diego, California, where her husband, Simon Marshall, had obtained a job as a sports scientist at San Diego State University.

Paterson did not take up triathlon again until 2007, when on returning to Scotland for a summer holiday she entered the Scottish National Championships, and won the race. This success revived her desire to race triathlons, and when she discovered XTERRA, she thought, "It looked muddy, so I thought I'd give it a crack." She obtained an elite licence, and attempted her first XTERRA race in 2008 in Temecula, California using a second-hand mountain bike. In that race she gained the lead on the bike stage, but "bonked" on the run stage through not taking in sufficient nutrition and was reduced to a walk. Despite that, she still managed to finish ninth. She commented, "I had surprised myself because I saw that I could compete. That really gave me the bit between my teeth."

With a new coach, Vince Fichera, she won a silver medal at the 2009 XTERRA World Championship and another silver at the 2010 Ironman 70.3 California, followed by a victory at her hometown race, the San Diego International Triathlon. In February 2011 she joined the Trek/K-Swiss team, then achieved three consecutive victories at the 2011 XTERRA Pacific Championships in Santa Cruz, the 2011 Orange County International Triathlon, and 2011 Ironman 70.3 Mooseman at Newfound Lake, New Hampshire, her first victory at the 70.3 distance.

On 23 October 2011, Paterson won her first XTERRA World Championship in Kapalua, Maui, despite suffering a flat tyre on the bike stage, and falling on the run stage. She recorded a run time of 43:54, the same as the men's winner Michael Weiss, and almost 10 minutes faster than Lance Armstrong, whose presence had led to increased publicity for the race. The three-time XTERRA champion Melanie McQuaid, who had led for most of the race and was overtaken by Paterson with less than a mile to go, collapsed 400 yards from the finish and required medical treatment. Paterson retained her title in 2012, winning by almost four minutes over Bárbara Riveros. In 2013, Paterson gained silver medals in both the XTERRA World Championship and the ITU Cross Triathlon World Championship.

Paterson's training was then interrupted by chronic Lyme disease, which almost completely prevented her racing in 2014 and the first part of 2015; the long-term effects of the disease continued to cause her pain while racing for many years. Facing an increasingly desperate financial position and the need to renew her option on the film rights to All Quiet, she entered the inaugural Costa Rica XTERRA triathlon, held on 29 March 2015. On a trial run (Note: Competitors in XTERRA are allowed to ride the bike course in advance, to familiarise themselves with the terrain.) the day before the race she fell off her bike and broke her shoulder, causing her extreme pain. She thought this might mean the end to her dream of winning an Oscar, but then her husband pointed out that she was "very good at the one-arm drill in the water" and suggested she race the swim stage using only one arm. Paterson agreed, realising that she had a "good kick". With the help of a large dose of painkillers, she finished the swim 12 minutes behind. By the end of the bike course she had moved up to second place, and finished the race as the winner. The $6,500 prize money was sufficient to enable her to meet the option payment due the following week.

Paterson won silver at the 2016 XTERRA World Championship. In 2018 she won gold at the XTERRA World Championship and the ITU Cross Triathlon World Championships.

=== Triathlon coaching ===
Paterson coaches triathletes using the name Braveheart Coaching. In November 2011, she described her coaching work as "the hardest and yet one of the most rewarding things I've ever done in triathlon. You feel like you just give, give, give and the life is drained out of you."

Together with her husband Simon Marshall – a sport psychology expert – she wrote a book, The Brave Athlete, which focuses on training the athlete's brain.

== Film career ==
Paterson studied drama as an undergraduate and completed a master's degree in theatre. She then began a career in acting, screenwriting and producing. She starred in the video for David Gray's song "Alibi". (Note: The video can be seen at <https://www.youtube.com/watch?v%3D4aM8saMdA04>.) She gave up acting after 3 years of trying, saying she was a "hopeless actor". Paterson found a writing-producing partner, triathlete and former journalist Ian Stokell. (Note: In an interview, Paterson said, "In my journey into the world of film, I met a triathlete, Ian Stokell, who wanted me to start writing with him. He convinced me if I really wanted to act in worthwhile projects, you must make your own film and put yourself in it. In addition to writing scripts together, we also produced independent films like Something Blue, which was made in 7 days with two directors, a dozen or so actors, in 27 locations, on a $10,000 budget.")

=== All Quiet on the Western Front ===
Paterson had loved the anti-war novel All Quiet on the Western Front by Erich Maria Remarque since she had studied it as a set text at school, a love shared by her screenwriting partner Stokell. A film version had been released in 1930, winning an Oscar for Best Picture. The book emphasises the horrors of war, and the despair and disillusionment of German soldiers, based on Remarque's experience in the First World War. Paterson and Stokell re-read the book together, and both realised there was an opportunity to re-make the film using modern technology. She said, "The theme of the betrayal of the youthful generation meant a lot to me, and my personality has always been that fight against the upper brass. I'm for the everyman. I'm a lefty." In a guest essay for The Hollywood Reporter she wrote that "I believed in this story. All Quiet was the first war novel I had ever read that was completely stripped of its genre catnip — heroism and adventure. It is a story about hopelessness and helplessness, about betrayal and shock, about losing one's own humanity until the only thing you have left is war". (Note: In an interview with 6-time Ironman World Champion Mark Allen, Paterson said, "I'm also drawn to the story of the other side. I think too often, especially nowadays, we think in silos, it's very polarised – it's them, it's us – and we never put ourselves in other people's shoes. And there's the story of this German boy, just like our boys, and they experience exactly the same things, but they are on the losing side. What does that look like? What does that mean?") They wrote a screenplay based on the book, and formed a film production company, Sliding Down Rainbows Entertainment.

In 2006 they bought an option to the film rights of the book. The option had to be renewed every year at a cost of between $10,000 and $15,000, eventually totalling about $200,000. Paterson used her race winnings to help finance the option, but she and her husband Simon Marshall had to remortgage their house. The shortage of funds caused many of their plans to fail. In July 2011 they signed Mimi Leder to direct the film adaptation, with shooting planned to start in 2012. Daniel Radcliffe was keen to act in the film, but there was no money. The financial situation became even worse in 2013–2015, when Paterson was prevented from racing by Lyme disease.

By 2015, Marshall was also helping with the screenplay, but he did not receive a screenwriting credit. (Note: "Her [Paterson's] only disappointment is that Marshall didn't get a joint screenwriting credit. Is he upset? 'Yes, in the nicest way, because he's such a lovely man. It's hard for him'.") The script includes extra scenes not in the book, covering negotiations to end the war. The screenwriters thought that these scenes needed to be in the film because "not enough people understand that the actions of World War One led to World War Two".

The original script was written in English, which the screenwriters expected to be a requirement for funding. In 2023, Paterson commented, "Everything in the film industry is about timing and 16 years ago, WW1 was not in the zeitgeist. It was not a popular war to cover at the cinema and certainly not from the German side". Since then changes in the film industry have included the introduction of streaming services. According to Paterson, the 2019 films Parasite (the first non-English language film to win an Academy Award for Best Picture) and 1917 (a WWI film) demonstrated that such films could be successful. Paterson had always wanted a German director, because she thought only a German could be true to the story of Remarque's book: "Unlike us, they are filled with shame about what happened". Then Paterson and Stokell were approached by director Edward Berger and producer Malte Grunert, whom they later met at the 2020 Berlinale film festival. Berger and Grunert wanted to make the film, but subject to the condition that it had to be in the German language. Paterson readily agreed, saying, "It felt authentic, and authenticity means a lot more now than it did 16 years ago", leading to a bidding war – won by Netflix – breaking out when Paterson, Stokell and Berger jointly pitched their screenplay as a German-language project.

The film, with the screenplay credited to Berger, Paterson and Stokell, received nine Oscar nominations and fourteen BAFTA Award nominations, including the 2022 BAFTA and Academy Awards for Best Adapted Screenplay; the film won seven BAFTA awards, including Best Adapted Screenplay.
