= Josiah Middaugh =

American professional triathlete (born 1978)

Personal information
- Born: July 25, 1978 (age 47) Michigan, United States
- Height: 73 in (185 cm)
- Weight: 160 lb (73 kg)

Sport
- Country: USA
- Sport: Triathlon

Achievements and titles
- World finals: 2015 Xterra World Champion
Medal record
Men's triathlon
Representing United States
ITU Cross Triathlon World Championships
Silver medal – second place	2016	Elite
Silver medal – second place	2014	Elite
XTERRA Triathlon World Championships
Gold medal – first place	2015	Elite
Silver medal – second place	2012	Elite
Silver medal – second place	2014	Elite
Bronze medal – third place	2004	Elite

Josiah Middaugh (born 25 July 1978) is an American professional triathlete, who most notably won the XTERRA Triathlon World Championships in 2015. He has also won 15 national XTERRA championships.
