= 2022 World Triathlon Winter Championships =

International sports competition

The 2022 World Triathlon Winter Championships were held in Sant Julià de Lòria, Andorra from February 3 to February 6, 2022.

== Medal summary ==
Event	Gold	Silver	Bronze
Men's Elite Triathlon	Franco Pesavento (ITA)	Marek Rauchfuss (CZE)	Evgeni Uliashev (RUS)
Women's Elite Triathlon	Daria Rogozina (RUS)	Sandra Mairhofer (ITA)	Elisabeth Sveum (NOR)
Men's Elite Duathlon	Franco Pesavento (ITA)	Viorel Palici (ROU)	Hans Christian Tungesvik (NOR)
Women's Elite Duathlon	Anna Medvedeva (RUS)	Ine Skjellum (NOR)	Maria Luisa Rasina (ROU)
2x2 Mixed Relay	Russia (RUS)	Italy (ITA)	Norway (NOR)

== Medals table ==
* Host nation (Andorra)

Rank	Nation	Gold	Silver	Bronze	Total
1	Russia (RUS)	3	0	1	4
2	Italy (ITA)	2	2	0	4
3	Norway (NOR)	0	1	3	4
4	Romania (ROU)	0	1	1	2
5	Czech Republic (CZE)	0	1	0	1
Totals (5 entries)		5	5	5	15
