= 2023 World Triathlon Long Distance Championships =

International sports competition

Long Distance Triathlon at the World Triathlon Multisports Championships
- Location: Ibiza, Spain
- Date: 7 May 2023

The 2023 World Triathlon Long Distance Championships was a triathlon competition held in Ibiza in Spain on May 7 2023 and organized by World Triathlon. The Elite races for men and consisted of a 3 km (1.9 mi) swim, 116 km (72 mi) bike and 30 km (19 mi) run, longer than the standard 1.5 km swim, 40 km bike and 10 km run associated with the World Triathlon Championship Series and the Olympic Games, but shorter than the classic Ironman Triathlon event.

The championship was held as part of the 2023 World Triathlon Multi-sports Championships which crowns several world champions in non Olympic distance events governed by World Triathlon.

== Medal Summary ==
| Event | Gold | | Silver | | Bronze | |
|---|---|---|---|---|---|---|
| Men | Clement Mignon; France | 5:17:17 | Antonio Benito Lopez; Spain | 5:17:49 | Matt Trautman; South Africa | 5:19:52 |
| Women | Marjolaine Pierre; France | 5:53:35 | Sara Svensk; Canada | 6:02:10 | Gurutze Frades Larralde; Spain | 6:06:48 |

== Results ==
The following are the results of the elite races:

=== Men Elite ===
| Rank | Athlete | Swim | T1 | Bike | T2 | Run | Time |
|---|---|---|---|---|---|---|---|
| 1st place, gold medalist(s) | Clement Mignon (FRA) | 36:13 | 2:27 | 2:48:22 | 3:04 | 1:47:13 | 5:17:17 |
| 2nd place, silver medalist(s) | Antonio Benito Lopez (ESP) | 36:06 | 2:14 | 2:50:56 | 2:34 | 1:46:00 | 5:17:49 |
| 3rd place, bronze medalist(s) | Matt Trautman (RSA) | 38:23 | 2:31 | 2:49:38 | 2:48 | 1:46:34 | 5:19:52 |
| 4 | Tristan Olij (NED) | 38:32 | 2:45 | 2:49:13 | 2:57 | 1:46:55 | 5:20:20 |
| 5 | Joshua Amberger (AUS) | 35:44 | 2:33 | 2:53:02 | 2:29 | 1:47:48 | 5:21:33 |
| 6 | Ondrej Kubo (SVK) | 38:30 | 2:42 | 2:51:38 | 3:03 | 1:46:45 | 5:22:36 |
| 7 | James Teagle (GBR) | 38:24 | 2:31 | 2:52:21 | 2:51 | 1:46:49 | 5:22:54 |
| 8 | Kenneth Vandendriessche (BEL) | 41:43 | 2:36 | 2:51:53 | 2:53 | 1:44:08 | 5:23:12 |
| 9 | Kacper Stepniak (POL) | 37:33 | 2:31 | 2:52:56 | 2:41 | 1:49:04 | 5:24:42 |
| 10 | Samuel Huerzeler (SUI) | 38:33 | 2:42 | 2:51:31 | 3:12 | 1:49:24 | 5:25:20 |
| 11 | Fernando Zorrilla Medrano (ESP) | 38:26 | 2:28 | 2:54:47 | 2:50 | 1:49:42 | 5:28:12 |
| 12 | Lukas Kocar (CZE) | 38:31 | 2:48 | 2:51:35 | 3:08 | 1:52:42 | 5:28:42 |
| 13 | Kristoffer Visti Graae (DEN) | 41:38 | 2:33 | 2:48:50 | 2:37 | 1:53:32 | 5:29:07 |
| 14 | Rico Bogen (GER) | 36:04 | 2:22 | 2:48:12 | 2:34 | 2:00:44 | 5:29:54 |
| 15 | Pello Osoro Gutierrez (ESP) | 42:00 | 2:26 | 2:54:40 | 2:42 | 1:48:56 | 5:30:42 |
| 16 | Jesper Svensson (SWE) | 36:09 | 2:41 | 2:57:28 | 2:53 | 1:52:04 | 5:31:12 |
| 17 | Christophe De Keyser (BEL) | 36:07 | 2:12 | 3:03:17 | 3:06 | 1:47:30 | 5:32:10 |
| 18 | Jesse Hinrichs (GER) | 37:41 | 2:34 | 2:52:44 | 3:22 | 1:56:06 | 5:32:26 |
| 19 | Victor Arroyo Bugallo (ESP) | 45:02 | 2:45 | 2:56:16 | 2:50 | 1:46:27 | 5:33:17 |
| 20 | Maurice Clavel (GER) | 38:30 | 2:28 | 2:51:59 | 3:03 | 1:58:04 | 5:34:03 |
| 21 | Eneko Llanos Burguera (ESP) | 38:40 | 2:46 | 3:00:30 | 3:11 | 1:49:21 | 5:34:26 |
| 22 | Joe Skipper (GBR) | 41:33 | 2:43 | 2:52:04 | 3:04 | 1:55:53 | 5:35:16 |
| 23 | Albert Moreno Molins (ESP) | 41:42 | 2:39 | 2:57:41 | 3:09 | 1:50:57 | 5:36:05 |
| 24 | Matteo Montanari (ITA) | 36:07 | 2:40 | 3:03:26 | 3:07 | 1:50:58 | 5:36:16 |
| 25 | Cody Beals (CAN) | 38:28 | 2:32 | 3:01:04 | 2:41 | 1:52:12 | 5:36:55 |
| 26 | Milan Brons (NED) | 38:33 | 2:42 | 3:00:55 | 3:15 | 1:52:06 | 5:37:29 |
| 27 | Emanuele Faraco (ITA) | 38:25 | 2:40 | 3:07:29 | 2:42 | 1:46:37 | 5:37:50 |
| 28 | Alexandre Nobre (POR) | 38:18 | 2:34 | 3:01:14 | 3:15 | 1:57:17 | 5:42:36 |
| 29 | Thiago Vinhal (BRA) | 38:22 | 2:46 | 3:09:05 | 3:55 | 1:51:43 | 5:45:50 |
| 30 | Kosuke Terasawa (JPN) | 38:27 | 2:49 | 3:08:59 | 3:17 | 1:53:28 | 5:46:58 |
| 31 | Liam Lloyd (GBR) | 38:33 | 2:30 | 2:54:09 | 2:48 | 2:10:17 | 5:48:15 |
| 32 | Christoffer Damm (DEN) | 41:41 | 2:32 | 2:55:54 | 3:07 | 2:05:26 | 5:48:38 |
| 33 | Franz Löschke (GER) | 38:29 | 2:30 | 3:20:10 | 3:58 | 1:48:46 | 5:53:50 |
| 34 | Marijn Markusse (NED) | 45:11 | 3:08 | 3:01:33 | 3:17 | 2:05:58 | 5:59:05 |
| 35 | Petr Soukup (CZE) | 41:46 | 2:36 | 3:19:29 | 2:40 | 1:53:57 | 6:00:27 |
| 36 | Péter Szilágyi (HUN) | 38:39 | 2:31 | 3:10:53 | 3:29 | 2:06:08 | 6:01:39 |
| 37 | Zoltán Petsuk (HUN) | 38:28 | 2:34 | 3:11:56 | 2:50 | 2:06:29 | 6:02:14 |
| 38 | Fabian Eisenlauer (GER) | 46:27 | 2:39 | 3:02:00 | 2:51 | 2:09:03 | 6:02:59 |
| 39 | Jesper Nybo Riis (DEN) | 47:30 | 2:59 | 3:05:16 | 3:14 | 2:13:19 | 6:12:17 |
| - | Mikel Ugarte Ramos (ESP) | 38:54 | 2:39 | 2:57:31 | 2:41 | - | DNF |
| - | Karol Dzalaj (SVK) | 45:27 | 3:47 | - | - | - | DNF |
| - | Richard Varga (SVK) | 35:40 | 2:33 | 2:51:20 | 2:48 | - | DNF |
| - | Patrik Nilsson (SWE) | 38:21 | 2:32 | 3:29:39 | - | - | DNF |
| - | Hotaka Yamagishi (JPN) | 1:03:42 | 5:23 | 3:26:30 | 5:39 | - | DNF |
| - | Jonathan Wayaffe (BEL) | 46:01 | 2:48 | - | - | - | DNF |
| - | Victor Alexendre (BEL) | - | - | - | - | - | DNS |
Key : DNF - did not finish ; DNS - did not start

=== Women Elite ===
| Rank | Athlete | Swim | T1 | Bike | T2 | Run | Time |
|---|---|---|---|---|---|---|---|
| 1st place, gold medalist(s) | Marjolaine Pierre (FRA) | 41:39 | 2:24 | 3:09:01 | 2:54 | 1:57:40 | 5:53:35 |
| 2nd place, silver medalist(s) | Sara Svensk (SWE) | 45:58 | 2:48 | 3:10:48 | 3:50 | 1:58:48 | 6:02:10 |
| 3rd place, bronze medalist(s) | Gurutze Frades Larralde (ESP) | 46:01 | 2:49 | 3:22:07 | 2:59 | 1:52:54 | 6:06:48 |
| 4 | Camilla Pedersen (DEN) | 41:38 | 2:41 | 3:19:15 | 3:09 | 2:02:16 | 6:08:57 |
| 5 | Svenja Thoes (GER) | 45:56 | 2:53 | 3:18:14 | 2:59 | 1:59:50 | 6:09:50 |
| 6 | Helene Alberdi Sololuze (ESP) | 41:13 | 2:33 | 3:25:15 | 3:18 | 2:01:28 | 6:13:45 |
| 7 | Giorgia Priarone (ITA) | 46:01 | 2:51 | 3:26:52 | 2:52 | 1:55:50 | 6:14:24 |
| 8 | Anna Noguera (ESP) | 43:19 | 2:59 | 3:24:39 | 3:02 | 2:00:58 | 6:14:55 |
| 9 | Ai Ueda (JPN) | 43:17 | 2:32 | 3:23:17 | 2:33 | 2:04:04 | 6:15:41 |
| 10 | Natia Van Heerden (RSA) | 46:02 | 2:51 | 3:22:08 | 3:00 | 2:02:46 | 6:16:44 |
| 11 | Katharina Wolff (GER) | 46:00 | 2:47 | 3:22:01 | 2:54 | 2:03:44 | 6:17:24 |
| 12 | Jana Uderstadt (GER) | 45:59 | 2:49 | 3:22:01 | 2:45 | 2:08:30 | 6:22:01 |
| 13 | Gabriella Zelinka (HUN) | 46:02 | 2:51 | 3:23:51 | 2:56 | 2:12:29 | 6:28:08 |
| 14 | Shiva Leisner (DEN) | 49:19 | 2:54 | 3:31:30 | 3:44 | 2:17:36 | 6:45:02 |
| 15 | Nina Derron (SUI) | 43:15 | 2:44 | 3:33:27 | 3:13 | 2:24:35 | 6:47:13 |
| 16 | Line Bonde (DEN) | 49:18 | 3:14 | 3:34:48 | 5:35 | 2:14:35 | 6:47:28 |
| - | Katrina Matthews (GBR) | 43:23 | 2:48 | - | - | - | DNF |
| - | Ruth Astle (GBR) | 45:59 | 2:50 | 3:07:43 | 3:10 | - | DNF |
| - | Mayo Yamauchi (JPN) | 45:59 | 2:52 | 3:57:05 | - | - | DNF |
Key : DNF - did not finish ; DNS - did not start

== Para and Age grade long distance ==
World championship races were also held in selected para triathlon and age grade classes. The winners of those events were as follows:

| Classification | Name | Nation | Time |
|---|---|---|---|
| PTS5 -Men | Eduardo Oliva Calderón | Spain | 9:24:58 |
| PTVI - Men | Zhalaldin Abduvaliev (B1) | Kyrgyzstan | 7:41:40 |
| 20-24 Male | Alexander Milne | Great Britain | 5:54:49 |
| 25-29 Male | Corentin Chouvelon | France | 5:41:52 |
| 30-34 Male | Stephen Derrett | Great Britain | 5:41:09 |
| 35-39 Male | Cedric Labadens | France | 6:03:00 |
| 40-44 Male | Jan-Morten Ra | Norway | 6:05:24 |
| 45-49 Male | David Navarro Cerdan | Spain | 6:09:32 |
| 50-54 Male | Alessandro Borgialli | Italy | 6:10:56 |
| 55-59 Male | Paolo Massarenti | Italy | 6:24:37 |
| 60-64 Male | Kevin Howard Bexley | Great Britain | 6:46:04 |
| 65-69 Male | Jose Mugica Izagirre | Spain | 7:08:24 |
| 70-74 Male | Jim Stewart | Canada | 7:30:12 |
| 75-79 Male | Richard File | Great Britain | 10:37:45 |
| 20-24 Female | Klaudia Petters | Poland | 6:50:26 |
| 25-29 Female | Hannah Maher | New Zealand | 6:49:29 |
| 30-34 Female | Jess Belcher | Great Britain | 6:57:06 |
| 35-39 Female | Mariana Marques | Portugal | 6:39:17 |
| 40-44 Female | Zoe Smith | Great Britain | 6:51:39 |
| 45-49 Female | Kerry McGawley | Great Britain | 7:04:59 |
| 50-54 Female | Elizabeth Ricaud | France | 7:35:32 |
| 55-59 Female | Maria Powell | Great Britain | 7:12:38 |
| 60-64 Female | Kerstin Mogull | Sweden | 7:27:51 |
| 65-69 Female | Pamela Dudas | Canada | 12:01:14 |
| 70-74 Female | Suzanne Mink | United States | 11:57:50 |
