= Sandra Mairhofer =

Italian triathlete and cyclist (born 1992)

Personal information
- Born: 12 June 1992 (age 34) Welsberg-Taisten, Italy

Cycling career
- Sport: Cycling
- Discipline: Mountain bike racing
- Role: Rider
- Rider type: Cross-country
Medal record
Representing Italy
Women's triathlon
World Triathlon Cross Championships
Gold medal – first place	2022 Târgu Mureș	Elite
Gold medal – first place	2023 Sant Antoni de Portmany	Elite
Silver medal – second place	2021 Guijo de Granadilla	Elite
World Triathlon Winter Championships
Gold medal – first place	2021 Sant Julià de Lòria	Elite
Gold medal – first place	2023 Skeikampen	Elite
Gold medal – first place	2024 Pragelato–Sestriere	Elite
Silver medal – second place	2022 Sant Julià de Lòria	Elite

Sandra Mairhofer (born 12 June 1992) is an Italian professional triathlete, duathlete and cross-country mountain biker. As a triathlete, she is a three-time world champion in winter triathlon and two-time world champion in cross triathlon. As a mountain biker, she has competed in the UCI Mountain Bike World Cup.

== Career ==
In 2021, Mairhofer won silver medal at the World Triathlon Cross Championships. She returned to the World Triathlon Cross Championships in 2022 and won, a feat she repeated in May 2023.

In February 2024, Mairhofer, then aged 31, won the gold medal in the women's elite category at the World Triathlon Winter Championships in Pragelato–Sestriere, marking her third world title in the discipline. In June, she won the Xterra Belgium cross triathlon, and in July, she won the 29th edition of the Dolomiti Superbike (an 85 kg cycling marathon).

Mairhofer has also competed in XTERRA Triathlon, where she won the silver medal at the World Championships twice in 2022 and 2024, as well as the European Championships, where she had won the gold medal in the 2021 edition, and the silver medal in the 2022 and 2023 editions.
