= World Triathlon Winter Championships =

Winter triathlon championship competition

Tournament information
- Sport: Winter triathlon
- Established: 1997
- Administrator: World Triathlon
- Format: run 6.2 km. (4 laps) mountain bike 11.8 km. (3 laps + connection) ski 10 km. (connection + 3 laps + connection)

Current champion
- Oleg Chestikov (ANA); Daria Rogozina (ANA)

The World Triathlon Winter Championships is a winter triathlon championship competition organised by World Triathlon. The competition has been held annually since 1997. Unlike normal triathlon races the winter triathlon discipline takes place in snow-covered terrain. The snow therefore means the normal disciplines of swimming and road cycling do not take place, instead the championship typically involves running, mountain biking and cross-country skiing.

== Venues ==
Year	Location
1997	(Italy) Mals
1998	(France) Les Menuires
1999	(Italy) Bardonnèche
2000	(Spain) Jaca
2001	(Switzerland) Lenzerheide
2002	(Italy) Brusson
2003	(Germany) Oberstaufen
2004	(Switzerland) Wildhaus
2005	(Slovakia) Štrbské Pleso
2006	(Norway) Sjusjøen
2007	(Italy) Flassin
2008	(Germany) Freudenstadt
2009	(Austria) Gaishorn am See
2010	(Norway) Eidsvoll
2011	(Finland) Jämijärvi
2012	(Finland) Jämijärvi
2013	(Italy) Cogne
2014	(Italy) Cogne
2016	(Austria) Zeltweg
2019	(Italy) Asiago
2020	(Italy) Asiago
2021	(Andorra) Sant Julià de Lòria
2022	(Andorra) Sant Julià de Lòria
2023	(Norway) Skeikampen
2024	(Italy) Pragelato–Sestriere
2025	(Italy) Cogne
2026	(Italy) Padola

== Medallists ==
=== Men's championship ===
Year	Gold		Silver		Bronze	
1997	Paolo Riva (ITA)	1h 41' 7"	Mathias Holzner (GER)	1h 43' 28"	Joergen Elden (NOR)	1h 44' 26"
1998	Paolo Riva (ITA)	1h 48' 25"	Philippe Lie (FRA)	1h 50' 44"	Othmar Bruegger (SUI)	1h 51' 17"
1999	Nicolas Lebrun (FRA)	1h 40' 27"	Paolo Riva (ITA)	1h 40' 48"	Zibi Szlufcik / GER (25x17px)	1h 44' 55"
2000	Nicolas Lebrun (FRA)	2h 12' 30"	Christoph Mauch (SUI)	2h 14' 57"	Juan Carlos Apilluelo (ESP)	2h 15' 47"
2001	Zibi Szlufcik (GER)	1h 29' 17"	Martin Lang (GER)	1h 31' 0"	Christoph Mauch (SUI)	1h 31' 31"
2002	Marc Ruhe (LIE)	1h 29' 44"	Christoph Mauch (SUI)	1h 30' 9"	Benjamin Sonntag (GER)	1h 31' 37"
2003	Benjamin Sonntag (GER)	1h 21' 12"	Christoph Mauch (SUI)	1h 22' 56"	Falk Gopfert (GER)	1h 23' 18"
2004	Siegfried Bauer (AUT)	1h 10' 21"	Othmar Brugger (SUI)	1h 10' 56"	Petter Jorgensen (NOR)	1h 11' 21"
2005	Siegfried Bauer (AUT)	1h 13' 23"	Stefan Frank (GER)	1h 13' 33"	Thomas Schrenk (GER)	1h 13' 35"
2006	Benjamin Sonntag (GER)	1h 34' 10"	Alf Roger Holme (NOR)	1h 34' 43"	Arne Post (NOR)	1h 35' 4"
2007	Arne Post (NOR)	1h 38' 5"	Siegfried Bauer (AUT)	1h 38' 45"	Nicolas Lebrun (FRA)	1h 39' 16"
2008	Arne Post (NOR)	1h 37' 30"	Nicolas Lebrun (FRA)	1h 39' 16"	Andreas Svanebo (SWE)	1h 39' 39"
2009	Tor Halvor Bjørnstad (NOR)	1h 18' 8"	Arne Post (NOR)	1h 18' 28"	Daniel Antonioli (ITA)	1h 19' 42"
2010	Andreas Svanebo (SWE)	1h 09' 40"	Tor Halvor Bjørnstad (NOR)	1h 10' 20"	Pavel Andreev (RUS)	1h 10' 22"
2011	Pavel Andreev (RUS)	1h 10' 31"	Arne Post (NOR)	1h 10' 37"	Andreas Svanebo (SWE)	1h 10' 50"
2012	Pavel Andreev (RUS)	1h 19' 27"	Daniel Antonioli (ITA)	1h 19' 43"	Andreas Svanebo (SWE)	1h 20' 21"
2013	Pavel Andreev (RUS)	1h 08' 24"	Daniel Antonioli (ITA)	1h 08' 25"	Evgeny Kirillov (RUS)	1h 08' 35"
2014	Pavel Andreev (RUS)	1h 03' 39"	Daniel Antonioli (ITA)	1h 03' 40"	Dmitriy Bregeda (RUS)	1h 04' 19"
2016	Pavel Andreev (RUS)	1h 19' 34"	Evgeny Kirillov (RUS)	1h 19' 49"	Giuseppe Lamastra (ITA)	1h 21' 07"
2018	Pavel Andreev (RUS)	1h 33' 37"	Pavel Yakimov (RUS)	1h 35' 15"	Marek Rauchfuss (CZE)	1h 35' 31"
2019	Pavel Andreev (RUS)	1h 24' 43"	Dmitriy Bregeda (RUS)	1h 25' 32"	Marek Rauchfuss (CZE)	1h 26' 32"
2020	Pavel Andreev (RUS)	1h 17' 25"	Marek Rauchfuss (CZE)	1h 17' 32"	Dmitriy Bregeda (RUS)	1h 17' 58"
2021	Hans Christian Tungesvik (NOR)	1h 16' 47"	Pavel Andreev (RUS)	1h 17' 46"	Giuseppe Lamastra (ITA)	1h 17' 50"
2022	Franco Pesavento (ITA)	1h 48' 10"	Marek Rauchfuss (CZE)	1h 48' 24"	Evgenii Uliashev (RUS)	1h 50' 49"
2023	Hans Christian Tungesvik (NOR)	1h 40' 17"	Marek Rauchfuss (CZE)	1h 41' 30"	Franco Pesavento (ITA)	1h 42' 14"
2024	Franco Pesavento (ITA)	1h 33' 51"	Hans Christian Tungesvik (NOR)	1h 34' 16"	Marek Rauchfuss (CZE)	1h 35' 41"
2025	Oleg Chestikov (ANA)	0h 58' 18"	Hans Christian Tungesvik (NOR)	0h 58' 35"	Marek Rauchfuss (CZE)	0h 58' 56"
2026	Dmitrii Kondrashov (ANA)	0h 55' 31"	Jens Kristoffer Dyrdahl (NOR)	0h 55' 34"	Oleg Chestikov (ANA)	0h 55' 35"

=== Women's championship ===
Year	Gold		Silver		Bronze	
1997	Maria Canins (ITA)	2h 1' 13"	Karin Möbes (SUI)	2h 2' 41"	Katinka Wiltenburg (NED)	2h 4' 32"
1998	Karin Möbes (SUI)	2h 8' 9"	Sigrid Lang (GER)	2h 13' 59"	Lucia Bianchetti (ITA)	2h 17' 29"
1999	Maria Canins (ITA)	2h 1' 7"	Karin Möbes (SUI)	2h 3' 33"	Marianne Vlasveld (NED)	2h 5' 57"
2000	Karin Möbes (SUI)	2h 42' 39"	Gabi Pauli (GER)	2h 43' 38"	Sigrid Lang (GER)	2h 45' 54"
2001	Sigrid Lang (GER)	1h 43' 31"	Karin Möbes (SUI)	1h 43' 55"	Marianne Vlasveld (NED)	1h 46' 52"
2002	Marianne Vlasveld (NED)	1h 45' 4"	Sigrid Lang (GER)	1h 47' 49"	Gabi Pauli (GER)	1h 50' 14"
2003	Marianne Vlasveld (NED)	1h 32' 36"	Sigrid Lang (GER)	1h 33' 5"	Jutta Schubert (GER)	1h 35' 8"
2004	Sigrid Lang (GER)	1h 18' 11"	Marianne Vlasveld (NED)	1h 19' 7"	Karin Möbes (SUI)	1h 21' 15"
2005	Sigrid Mutscheller (GER)	1h 18' 15"	Marianne Vlasveld (NED)	1h 19' 34"	Maria Kalnes (NOR)	1h 20' 4"
2006	Sigrid Mutscheller (GER)	1h 41' 24"	Eva Nyström (SWE)	1h 46' 14"	Gabi Pauli (GER)	1h 46' 14"
2007	Sigrid Mutscheller (GER)	1h 53' 24"	Carina Wasle (AUT)	1h 56' 2"	Michela Benzoni (ITA)	1h 56' 24"
2008	Sigrid Mutscheller (GER)	1h 51' 4"	Anke Kullmann (GER)	1h 52' 25"	Carina Wasle (AUT)	1h 53' 20"
2009	Carina Wasle (AUT)	1h 32' 28"	Hanne Trønnes (NOR)	1h 34' 06"	Rebecca Dussault (USA)	1h 35' 30"
2010	Rebecca Dussault (USA)	1h 19' 45"	Tatiana Charochkina (RUS)	1h 21' 34"	Hanne Trønnes (NOR)	1h 21' 40"
2011	Borghild Løvset (NOR)	1h 22' 2"	Sarka Grabmullerova (CZE)	1h 24' 35"	Maija Oravamäki (FIN)	1h 25' 25"
2012	Héléna Erbenova (CZE)	1h 31' 51"	Maija Oravamäki (FIN)	1h 32' 00"	Borghild Løvset (NOR)	1h 32' 3"
2013	Héléna Erbenova (CZE)	1h 20' 10"	Elisabeth Sveum (NOR)	1h 23' 22"	Sarka Grabmullerova (CZE)	1h 24' 24"
2014	Borghild Løvset (NOR)	1h 14' 8"	Olga Parfinenko (RUS)	1h 16' 18"	Sarka Grabmullerova (CZE)	1h 16' 33"
2016	Yulia Surikova (RUS)	1h 27' 31"	Olga Parfinenko (RUS)	1h 29' 32"	Romana Slavinec (AUT)	1h 32' 07"
2018	Yulia Surikova (RUS)	1h 47' 51"	Héléna Erbenova (CZE)	1h 49' 21"	Romana Slavinec (AUT)	1h 53' 32"
2019	Daria Rogozina (RUS)	1h 40' 54"	Yulia Surikova (RUS)	1h 44' 35"	Romana Slavinec (AUT)	1h 45' 22"
2020	Daria Rogozina (RUS)	1h 33' 22"	Anna Medvedeva (RUS)	1h 33' 10"	Yulia Surikova (RUS)	1h 34' 01"
2021	Sandra Mairhofer (ITA)	1h 33' 22"	Romana Slavinec (AUT)	1h 33' 10"	Anna Medvedeva (RUS)	1h 34' 01"
2022	Daria Rogozina (RUS)	2h 03' 59"	Sandra Mairhofer (ITA)	2h 07' 16"	Elisabeth Sveum (NOR)	2h 07' 42"
2023	Sandra Mairhofer (ITA)	2h 00' 09"	Ingrid Lorvik (NOR)	2h 04' 31"	Carina Wasle (AUT)	2h 08' 44"
2024	Sandra Mairhofer (ITA)	1h 50' 32"	Aneta Grabmüller Soldati (CZE)	1h 52' 14"	Julie Meinicke (NOR)	1h 58' 30"
2025	Daria Rogozina (ANA)	1h 05' 58"	Aneta Grabmüller Soldati (CZE)	1h 07' 25"	Helena Karásková (CZE)	1h 08' 55"
2026	Daria Rogozina (ANA)	1h 02' 44"	Alina Liagaeva (ANA)	1h 03' 38"	Axelle Vicari (ITA)	1h 05' 48"

=== Medal table ===
Rank	Nation	Gold	Silver	Bronze	Total
1	Russia	16	9	7	32
2	Germany	8	8	7	23
3	Italy	8	4	7	19
4	Norway	7	10	7	24
5	Austria	3	3	4	10
6	Switzerland	2	7	3	12
7	Netherlands	2	2	3	7
8	France	2	2	1	5
9	Sweden	1	1	3	5
10	Poland	1	0	1	2
10	United States	1	0	1	2
12	Liechtenstein	1	0	0	1
13	Czech Republic	0	5	6	11
14	Finland	0	1	1	2
15	Spain	0	0	1	1
Totals (15 entries)		52	52	52	156
