= Braden Currie =

New Zealand triathlete

Personal information
- Born: 29 May 1986 (age 40) Methven, New Zealand
- Website: bradencurrie.com

Sport
- Country: New Zealand
- Sport: Triathlon
Medal record
Men's triathlon
Representing New Zealand
Ironman World Championships
Bronze medal – third place	2021 St. George	Elite
World Triathlon Cross Championships
Bronze medal – third place	2014	Elite
Bronze medal – third place	2016	Elite

Braden Currie (born 29 May 1986) is a New Zealand professional long-distance triathlete. He won a bronze medal at the 2021 Ironman World Championship. He also competes in the cross triathlon, having won bronze medals at the 2014 and 2016 World Triathlon Cross Championships.
