= 2025 World Triathlon Long Distance Championships =

International sports competition

Long Distance Triathlon at the World Triathlon Multisports Championships
- Location: Pontevedra, Spain
- Date: 29 June 2025

Champions
- Men: Antonio Benito Lopez (ESP)
- Women: Marjolaine Pierre (FRA)

The 2025 World Triathlon Long Distance Championships was a triathlon competition held in Pontevedra, , Spain on 29 June 2025 and organized by World Triathlon. The Elite races for men and consisted of a 3 km (1.9 mi) swim, 120 km (75 mi) bike and 30 km (19 mi) run, longer than the standard 1.5 km swim, 40 km bike and 10 km run associated with the World Triathlon Championship Series and the Olympic Games, but shorter than the classic Ironman Triathlon event. The championship was held as part of the 2025 World Triathlon Multi-sports Championships which crowns several world champions in non Olympic distance events governed by World Triathlon.

== Medal Summary ==
Event	Gold		Silver		Bronze	
Men	Antonio Benito Lopez; Spain	5:33:33	Dylan Magnien; France	5:40:52	William Draper; Great Britain	5:41:12
Women	Marjolaine Pierre; France	6:15:50	Marta Lagownik; Poland	6:27:12	Charlène Clavel; France	6:30:48

== Results ==
The following are the results of the elite races:

=== Men ===
Rank	Athlete	Swim	T1	Bike	T2	Run	Time
1st place, gold medalist(s)	Antonio Benito Lopez (ESP)	41:35	2:26	2:57:28	3:17	1:48:50	5:33:33
2nd place, silver medalist(s)	Dylan Magnien (FRA)	41:37	2:27	3:02:07	3:32	1:51:11	5:40:52
3rd place, bronze medalist(s)	William Draper (GBR)	45:43	3:03	2:56:56	3:09	1:52:23	5:41:12
4	Lukas Kocar (CZE)	42:47	2:49	3:00:37	3:19	1:52:47	5:42:18
5	Jordi Montraveta (ESP)	49:41	2:41	2:59:09	3:06	1:50:22	5:44:57
6	Ondrej Kubo (SVK)	46:25	2:41	2:57:06	3:37	1:56:15	5:46:02
7	Louis Naeyaert (BEL)	42:50	2:42	3:04:47	3:46	1:52:21	5:46:25
8	Joshua Amberger (AUS)	41:34	2:27	3:02:35	3:03	1:57:10	5:46:47
9	Rostislav Pevtsov (UKR)	42:12	2:34	3:06:08	3:50	1:53:14	5:47:55
10	Tom Vaelen (BEL)	41:39	2:27	2:57:20	3:11	2:07:37	5:52:12
11	Mikel Ugarte Ramos (ESP)	45:06	2:42	3:02:35	3:03	2:00:20	5:53:44
12	Giel Meesen (NED)	49:41	2:45	2:59:52	3:30	2:01:34	5:57:20
13	Ernest Mantell (USA)	48:34	2:56	3:12:14	3:52	2:01:05	6:08:39
14	João Francisco Ferreira (POR)	45:10	2:49	3:02:29	3:47	2:21:00	6:15:13
15	Thomas McManners (FIN)	50:14	2:55	3:24:34	4:00	2:05:16	6:26:57
16	Anton Blokhin (UKR)	45:44	2:27	3:40:17	5:18	2:09:27	6:43:12
17	Johnathan Dolan (USA)	41:59	2:42	3:24:16	3:42	2:33:55	6:46:31
18	Takaaki Koja (JPN)	45:46	3:17	3:39:16	5:37	2:52:26	7:26:21
—	Guillem Montiel Moreno (ESP)	41:40	3:08	2:54:41	3:11	–	DNF
—	Casimir Moine (FRA)	41:34	2:36	2:57:21	3:18	–	DNF
—	Marek Janisz (POL)	57:08	2:43	3:11:24	3:17	–	DNF
—	Petr Civela (CZE)	50:16	4:21	3:19:57	4:28	–	DNF
—	Hotaka Yamagishi (JPN)	1:03:42	5:23	3:26:30	5:39	–	DNF
—	Jonathan Wayaffe (BEL)	46:01	2:48	–	–	–	DNF
—	Victor Alexendre (BEL)	–	–	–	–	–	DNS
Key : DNF - did not finish ; DNS - did not start

=== Women ===
Rank	Athlete	Swim	T1	Bike	T2	Run	Time
1st place, gold medalist(s)	Marjolaine Pierre (FRA)	51:21	2:42	3:11:51	3:19	2:06:41	6:15:50
2nd place, silver medalist(s)	Marta Lagownik (POL)	53:29	2:38	3:25:50	3:19	2:01:58	6:27:12
3rd place, bronze medalist(s)	Charlène Clavel (FRA)	55:18	3:01	3:20:57	3:25	2:08:09	6:30:48
4	Marta Bernardi (ITA)	54:38	3:18	3:32:58	3:37	2:08:09	6:42:38
5	Hanna Maksimava (BLR)	51:20	2:36	3:47:49	3:32	2:09:41	6:54:56
6	Margareta Bicanova (SVK)	54:55	3:27	3:54:15	3:31	2:18:40	7:14:47
7	Julia Klein (GER)	1:12:03	3:43	3:50:00	4:30	2:19:31	7:29:44
8	Simona Krivankova (CZE)	1:12:07	4:52	3:51:14	5:33	2:21:47	7:35:31
9	Misaki Tanaka (JPN)	54:53	4:01	4:06:07	4:57	2:35:20	7:45:16
—	Chloe Sparrow (GBR)	45:59	3:20	3:41:03	4:15	—	DNF
—	Aurelia Boulanger (FRA)	1:04:18	4:01	3:28:53	3:28	—	DNF
—	Judith Corachan Vaquero (ESP)	53:31	3:09	3:34:17	3:17	—	DNF
Key : DNF - did not finish ; DNS - did not start
