= Nissan Xterra =

Nissan motor vehicle (1999–2015)

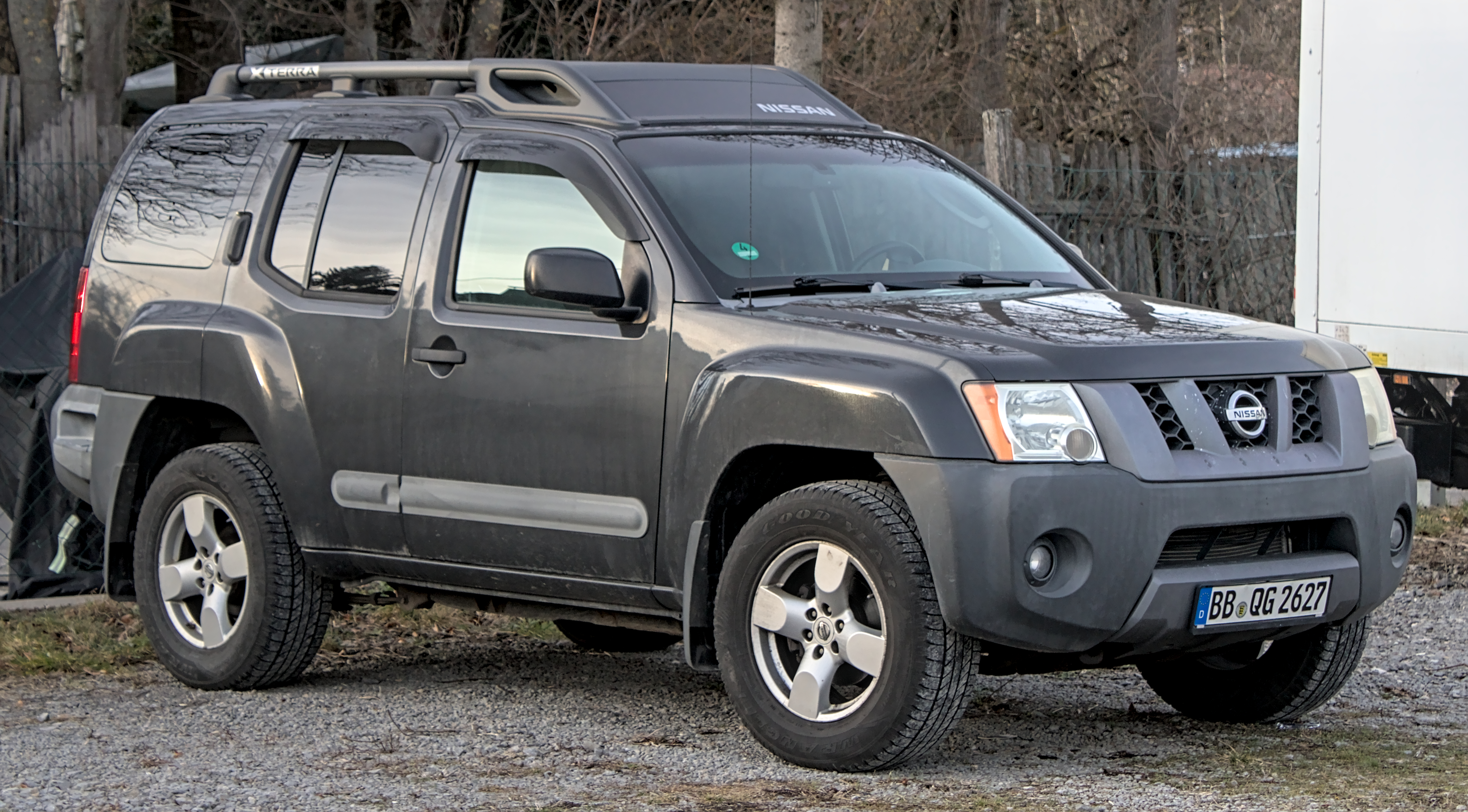
- Second-generation Nissan Xterra

Overview
- Manufacturer: Nissan
- Also called: Nissan Paladin (China); Nissan Roniz (Iran); Dongfeng Oting (China)
- Production: April 19, 1999– August 18, 2015; 2028 (to commence)
- Model years: 2000–2015; 2029

Body and chassis
- Class: Compact SUV
- Body style: 5-door SUV
- Layout: Front-engine, rear-wheel-drive Front-engine, four-wheel-drive
- Chassis: Body-on-frame

Chronology
- Successor: Nissan Rogue; Nissan Murano; Nissan Terra (China)

The Nissan Xterra is a truck-based compact SUV that was first manufactured and marketed by Nissan from 1999 to 2015 across two generations; the first (1999–2004) sharing a platform and many of its major exterior parts from the front doors forward with the Nissan (D22) Frontier pickup – and the second (2005–2015) sharing the Nissan F-Alpha platform with the Frontier and Pathfinder. It is planned to be reintroduced in 2028.

Sporting a name licensed from the XTERRA off-road triathlon race series, the vehicle was positioned by Nissan as functional and reliable outdoor gear, epitomized by its marketing tagline “Everything You Need, Nothing You Don’t.”

It was developed in La Jolla, California, by Nissan Design International (NDI)'s (now Nissan Design America) then Director of Design Tom Semple, and became the first Nissan vehicle completely conceived, developed and manufactured in the United States. According to Jerry Hirshberg, president of Nissan Design International (NDI), "the impetus for Xterra designers was to create an affordable, rugged, quality piece of equipment". He later described it as "a garage tool that says, 'treat me rough' – it's designed to look better dirty than clean."

While the two Xterra generations differed significantly, both prioritized ruggedness, practicality, and affordability over luxury. Traditional body-on-frame construction and underbody skid plates reflected both its truck heritage and off-road capability. Throughout its lifetime the Xterra used a two-box design with a prominent two-tiered roof enabling second row stadium seating, C-pillar-mounted rear door handles, asymmetrical rear window, and a distinctive tailgate bump-out for an inside mounted first aid kit. For hauling exterior loads a roof rack with a removable forward gear basket was standard equipment.

Road & Track described the Xterra as "an honest SUV that doesn't try to be a luxury car alternative, nor tries to hide its truck underpinnings". Jalopnik called it a "knockoff of the Land Rover Discovery". The Washington Post described it as "rugged without bravado".

First generation manufacture took place at Nissan's Decherd, Tennessee Plant (engines) and Smyrna Assembly plant (final assembly). Second generation Xterras were manufactured at the company's Canton, Mississippi plant (final assembly). Variants were also manufactured in Brazil and China.

== First generation (WD22; 1999) ==
First generation
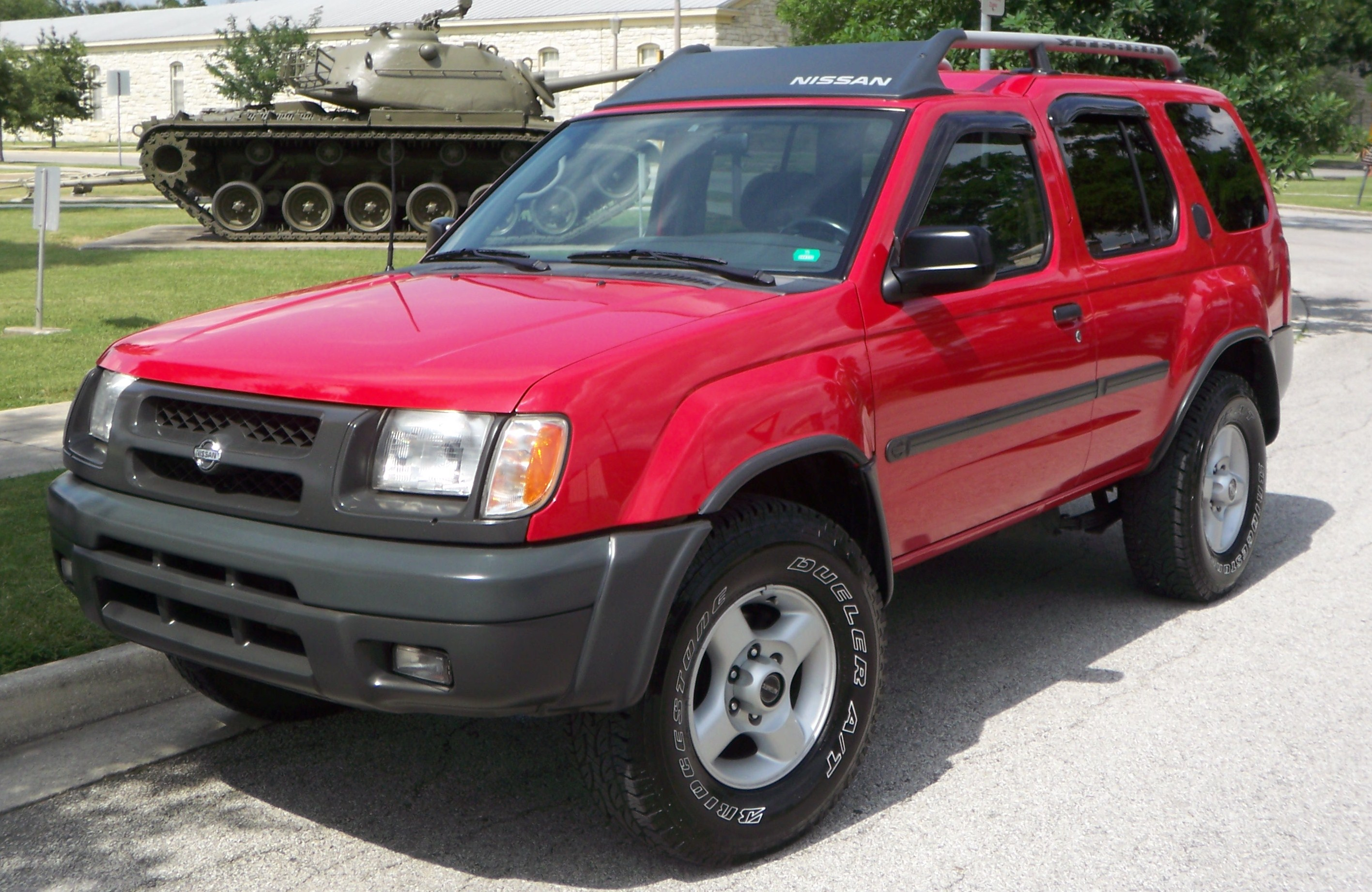

Overview
- Model code: WD22
- Also called: Nissan Paladin (China); Nissan Roniz (Iran)
- Production: April 19, 1999 – 2004 (United States); 1999–2009 (Iran); 2003–2008 (Brazil); 2003–2015 (China)
- Model years: 2000–2004
- Assembly: United States: Smyrna, Tennessee (NSAP); Brazil: São José dos Pinhais; China: Zhengzhou, Henan (Zhengzhou Nissan); Iran: Karaj
- Designer: Tom Semple with Robert Bauer and Diane Allen

Body and chassis
- Related: Nissan Frontier (D22); Nissan Pathfinder (R50)

Powertrain
- Engine: Gasoline: 2.4 L KA24DE I4; 3.3 L VG33E V6; 3.3 L VG33ER supercharged V6; Diesel: 2.8 L MWM 4.07TCA TDI I4; 2.8 L MWM 4.07TCE TDI CRD I4
- Transmission: 4-speed automatic 5-speed manual

Dimensions
- Wheelbase: 2,650 mm (104.3 in)
- Length: 4,522 mm (178.0 in)
- Width: 1,788 mm (70.4 in)
- Height: 1,834–1,879 mm (72.2–74.0 in)

The Xterra was developed in 1999 at (then) Nissan Design International in California. Designed to be "about what people do with the vehicle, as much as what the vehicle can do,” it was introduced in North America in the 2000 model year in two trim levels, XE and SE.

The base XE featured a 143 hp (107 kW) KA24DE I4, rear-wheel 2WD, 5-speed manual transmission, and steel wheels, and a roof rack (rated for a load up to 125lbs). Options included a 170-horsepower 3.3 L VG33E SOHC V6 engine, 4-speed automatic transmission, and part-time 4WD. The SE featured standard equipment that was optional on an XE, including 4WD, side step-rails, and moonroof. All models featured removable, tab-secured rear seat cushions to accommodate a fold-flat rear seat back. Canadian models from 1999 to 2004 were limited to the VG33E V6 engine with part-time 4WD.

=== 2002 update ===
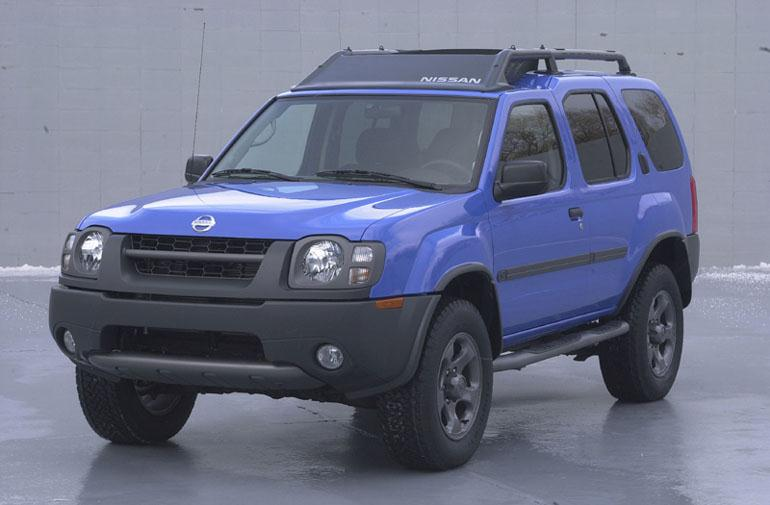
2002–2004 Nissan Xterra

All updates for the 2002 Xterra were executed at the Nissan Technical Center-North America in Farmington Hills, Michigan. It was again available both in rear-wheel 2WD and part-time 4WD models.

The facelifted model debuted at the 2001 Chicago Auto Show with an optional supercharged V6 engine, revised front-end styling with rounded headlights and raised hood (48mm), revised instrument panel with three round gauges in grey trim (XE) or blue (SE), revised HVAC controls, console with side map pocket, 25 percent larger glove box, map lamp with integrated compass (SE), pull-out rear cup holders, four interior power points, revised new seat fabrics, standard variable intermittent front windshield wipers and rear wiper, optional 300-watt audio system, foot-operated pedal parking brake replacing the dash-mounted pull-and-twist parking brake — and an increase of 10 horsepower for the V6 engine.

The 3.3L VG33E V6 was upgraded to 180 hp (134 kW) at 4,800 rpm and 202 lb⋅ft (274 N⋅m) at 2,800 rpm on the XE and SE models. A 210 hp (157 kW) Eaton M62 supercharged VG33ER option (carried over from the 2001 Nissan Frontier) was made available only on the SE S/C version. It produced 246 lb⋅ft (334 N⋅m) of torque for the automatic, and 231 lb⋅ft (313 N⋅m) of torque with 5-speed manual.

For 2003 the front seats received additional adjustability with added lumbar support and in SE models the available 6-disc, 4-speaker AM/FM/CD audio system was replaced by a 6-speaker 300W Rockford Fosgate AM/FM/CD audio system with an 8-inch subwoofer that took up a small portion of the rear storage area. The last of the 2004 model year Xterras were manufactured in January 2005.

=== Brazilian production ===
The Xterra entered production in Brazil in June 2003, being assembled in the Renault-Nissan Alliance commercial vehicle plant in São José dos Pinhais. Renault-Nissan had already been building the related Nissan Frontier pickup truck since June 2002. The Brazilian-made Xterra was equipped with a locally built, MWM Sprint 2.8-liter turbodiesel four-cylinder engine developing 132 PS (97 kW; 130 hp) at 3,600 rpm. Torque rating is 340 N⋅m (251 lb⋅ft) at 1,800 rpm.

For the 2006 model year, MWM updated the engine to include common rail injection and an electronic control unit; hence known as the "Electronic". Power increased to 140 PS (103 kW; 138 hp) at 3,400 rpm; claimed torque remained unchanged but at a somewhat lower 1,700 rpm.

== Second generation (N50; 2005) ==
Second generation
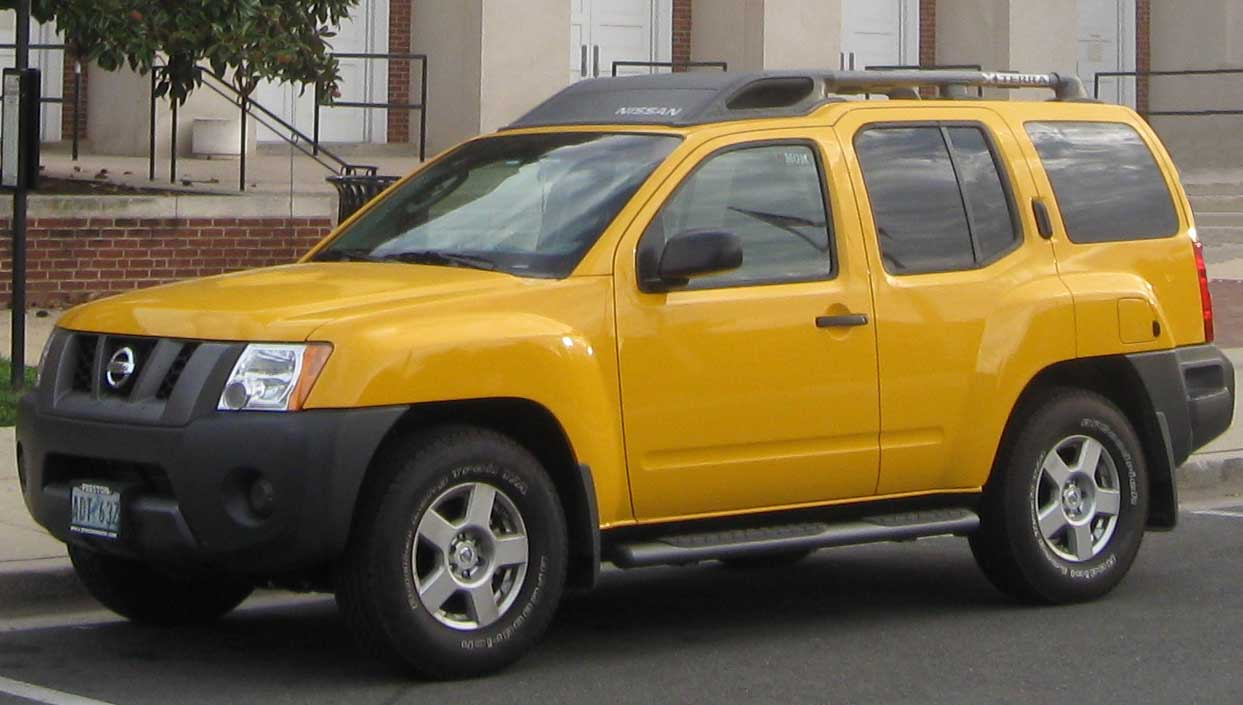

Overview
- Model code: N50
- Production: January 7, 2005 – August 18, 2015
- Model years: 2005–2015
- Assembly: United States: Smyrna, Tennessee (NSAP; 2005–2012); Canton, Mississippi (Nissan North America; 2012–2015)

Body and chassis
- Platform: Nissan F-Alpha platform
- Related: Nissan Pathfinder (R51); Nissan Navara/Frontier (D40)

Powertrain
- Engine: Gasoline: 4.0 L VQ40DE V6
- Power output: 261 hp (265 PS; 195 kW)
- Transmission: 5-speed automatic 6-speed manual

Dimensions
- Wheelbase: 2,700 mm (106.3 in)
- Length: 4,539 mm (178.7 in)
- Width: 1,849 mm (72.8 in)
- Height: 1,902 mm (74.9 in)
- Curb weight: 4,140–4,425 lb

The second generation Xterra debuted at the New York International Auto Show in 2004 and entered showrooms in early 2005 for the 2005 model year. Sharing Nissan's F-Alpha platform with the Titan and Armada, it was larger in all dimensions than its predecessor. The standard engine was upgraded to Nissan's 4.0 L VQ40DE variable valve timing DOHC V6, producing 261 hp (195 kW) and 281 lb⋅ft (381 N⋅m) of torque.

Early US models include X, S, SE, and Off Road, with a choice of 6-speed manual or 5-speed automatic transmissions, a choice of part-time 4-wheel drive or 2-wheel drive. The M226 rear axle with a Dana 44 differential was standard on all manual transmission equipped models as well as all Off-Road models. The Off-Road also came standard with an electronic rear locking differential and either hill descent/start control or clutch interlock bypass switch on automatic and manual examples respectively.

=== 2009 update ===
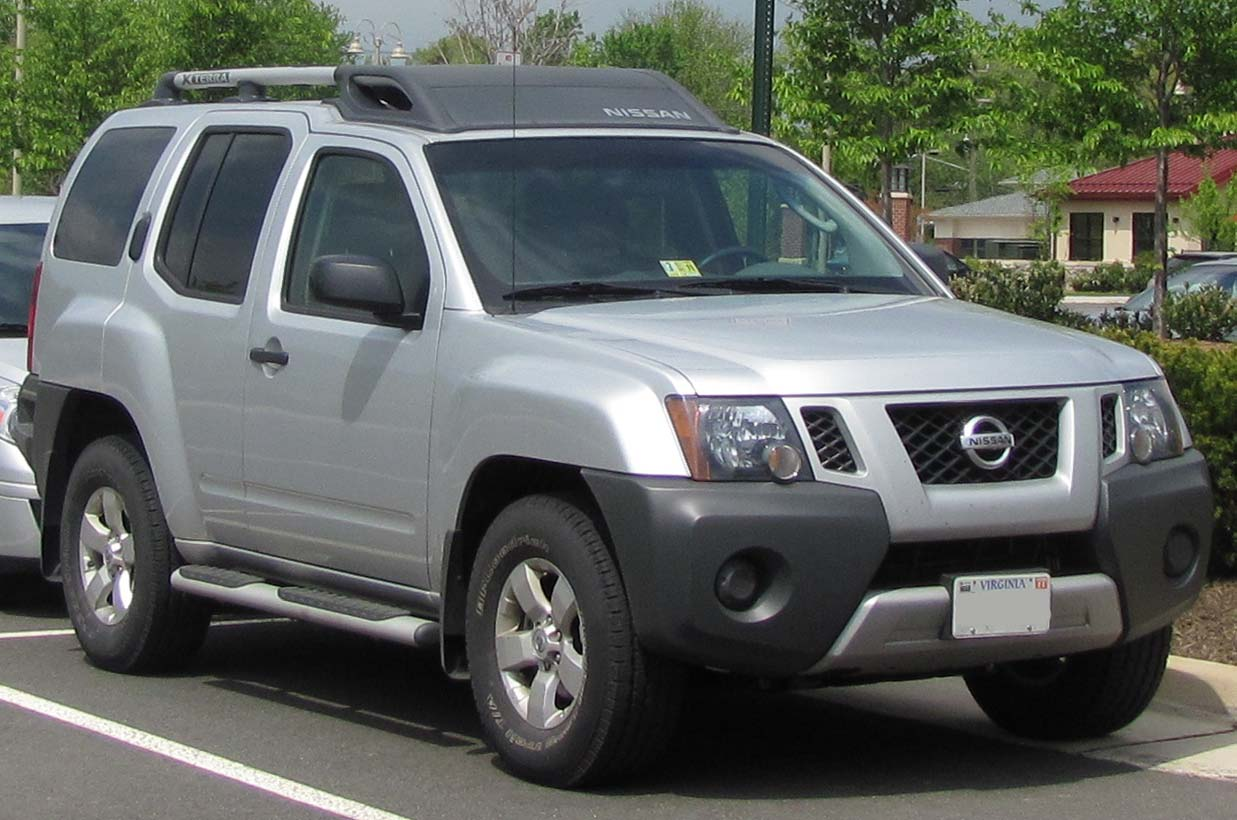
2009–2012 Nissan Xterra

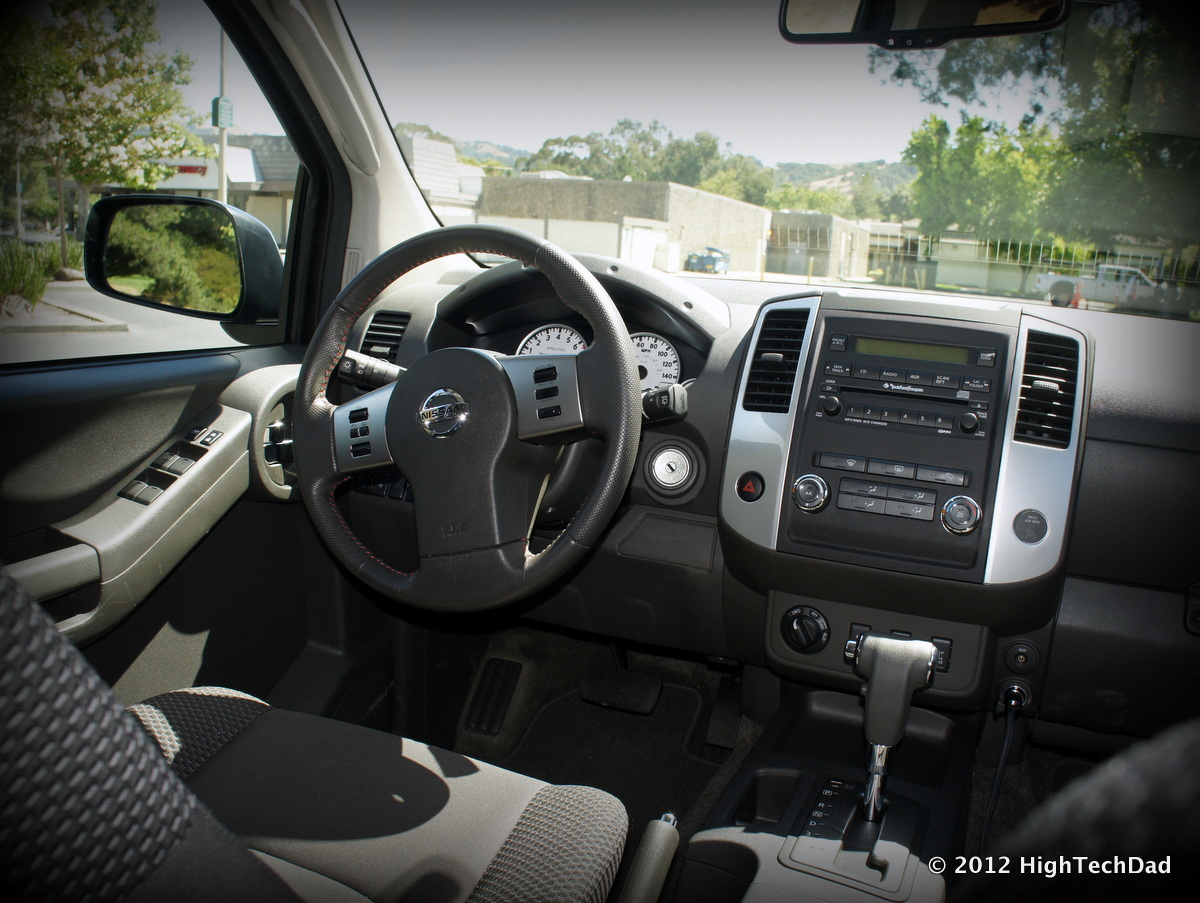
2012 Nissan Xterra Pro-4X dashboard

The Xterra received a facelift for 2009 (July 2008 production) with more options and colors, optional leather seats on SE models, new grille and front bumper, silver painted rear bumper and roof rack, and roof mounted lights on off-road models. The last year of the Nissan Xterra in Mexico was 2008. In 2012, production was moved from Smyrna, Tennessee, to Nissan's facility in Canton, Mississippi.

Other changes include:

- New HVAC controls and standard audio system.
- Available Bluetooth Hands-free Phone System, steering wheel audio controls and sunglass holder (overhead console) on all grade levels, except X model.
- Removed plastic engine cover.

=== Other updates ===
- Changed name of off-road model to PRO-4X. (2011)
- Discontinued SE trim (2011)
- Offered optional updated NissanConnect with 4.3 or 5.8 inch screen and smartphone integration for iPhone and Android, allowing the user to connect with Pandora, iHeartRadio, Facebook and more. Capabilities include SiriusXM (subscription required, sold separately), streaming audio via Bluetooth, Hands-free Text Messaging Assistant and audio voice recognition. (2013)
- New 16-inch aluminum-alloy wheel designs for the S and PRO-4X. (2014)
- Heated front seats available on PRO-4X. (2014)
- Available rear backup camera. (2014)

=== Discontinuation and successor ===
The Xterra was discontinued in the U.S. after the 2015 model year. Poor fuel economy, declining sales since 2008, and mandated upgrades to safety and emissions were cited as reasons.

Following the Xterra's discontinuation from the U.S. market in 2015, Nissan began testing the D23 Navara-based SUV. The SUV, later named Terra, made its debut in Asia in March 2018, and the updated version was released in the Middle East in November 2020 under the X-Terra name.

== Third generation (2028) ==
The third generation Xterra was officially teased on 14 April 2026 returning for the 2029 model year.

== Awards and recognition ==
- 2000 Motor Trend's Sport Utility of the Year
- 2000 North American Truck of the Year
- 2000 New England Motor Press Association's Winter Vehicle Award of New England for Best in Class – Mini Sport Utility
- 2001 Named Top Car by AAA New Car and Truck Buying Guide
- 2005 Named on the Automobile Magazine's 50 Great New Cars list
- 2006 Nominated as North American Truck of the Year
- 2006 Motor Trend's Sport Utility of the Year
- 2006 Motor Trend's Truck Trend's Best Little-Guy SUV Award
- 2006 Car and Driver Rock-Hopper SUV Winner.
- 2006 4×4 of the Year award from Petersen's 4-Wheel and Off-Road magazine.
- 2006 Edmunds.com Editor's Most Wanted Vehicle
- 2009 4Wheeler Magazine's SUV of the Year
- 2010 U.S. National Highway Traffic Safety Administration's highest Side-impact Safety Rating (five stars)

In 2001, the advertising firm of TBWA\Chiat\Day won the Grand Effie, a global marketing award, for its introductory advertising campaign for the original Xterra — postitioning the Xterra as reliable and functional outdoor gear, captured in the marketing tagline “Everything You Need, Nothing You Don't.”

== Production outside North America ==
All Nissan-produced Xterras manufactured outside the U.S. were built in São José dos Pinhais, Brazil until 2007. (Nissan ceased Brazilian production entirely in 2007.) It is built under license by Pars Khodro in Iran as the Nissan Roniz, and in China by Zhengzhou Nissan Automobile as the Nissan Paladin from 2003 to 2013. The Paladin uses the same chassis and running gear as the first generation Nissan Xterra, and the 2.4L KA24DE engine mated to a 5-speed manual transmission. The front end is from the local Pickup. (The second generation Xterra model is only available in North America.) Other difference between the American Xterra and its Chinese counterparts is the parking brake actuator, a pedal with a pull-handle release in America, and a lever in China.

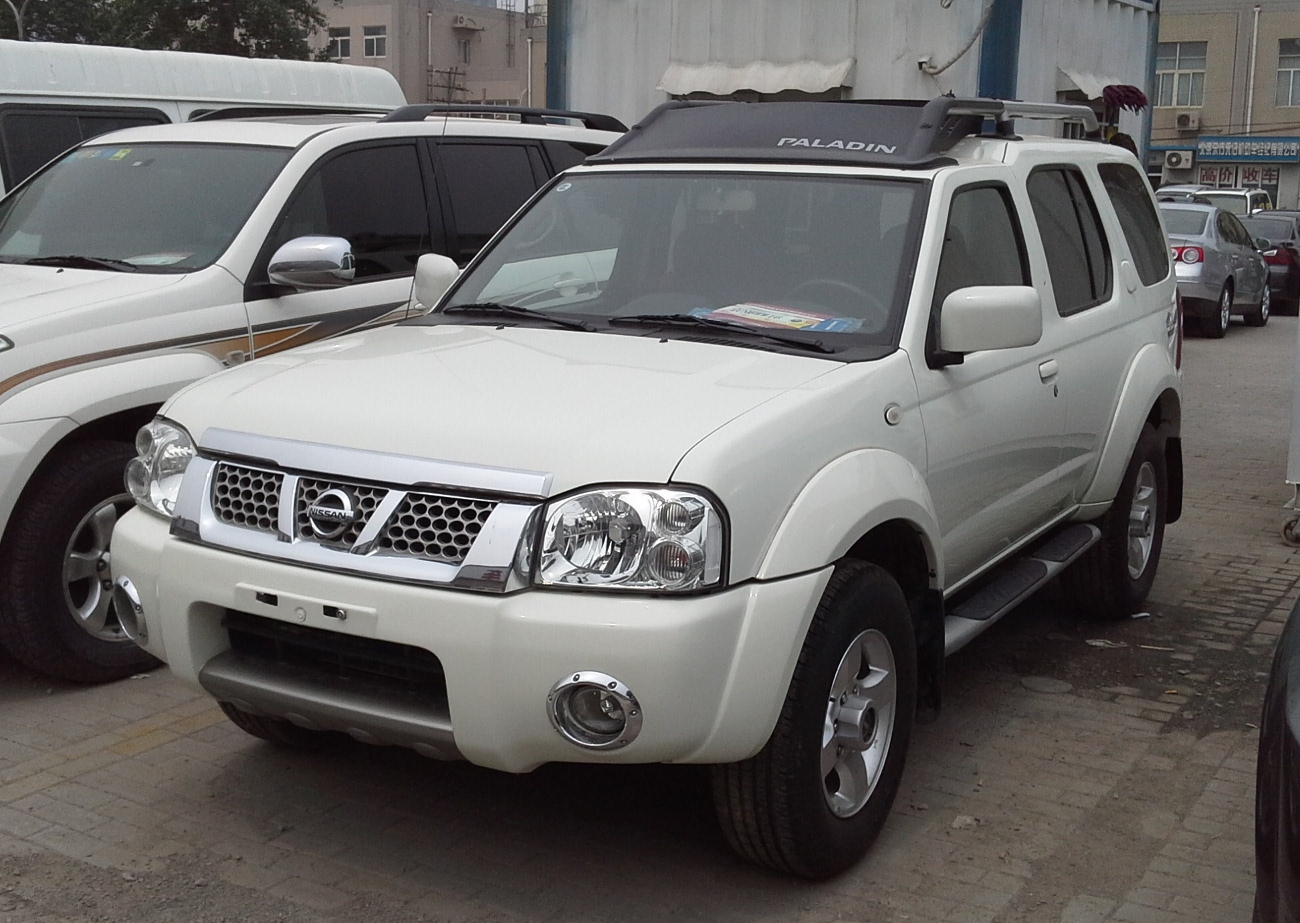
Nissan Paladin

Nissan Paladin rear view

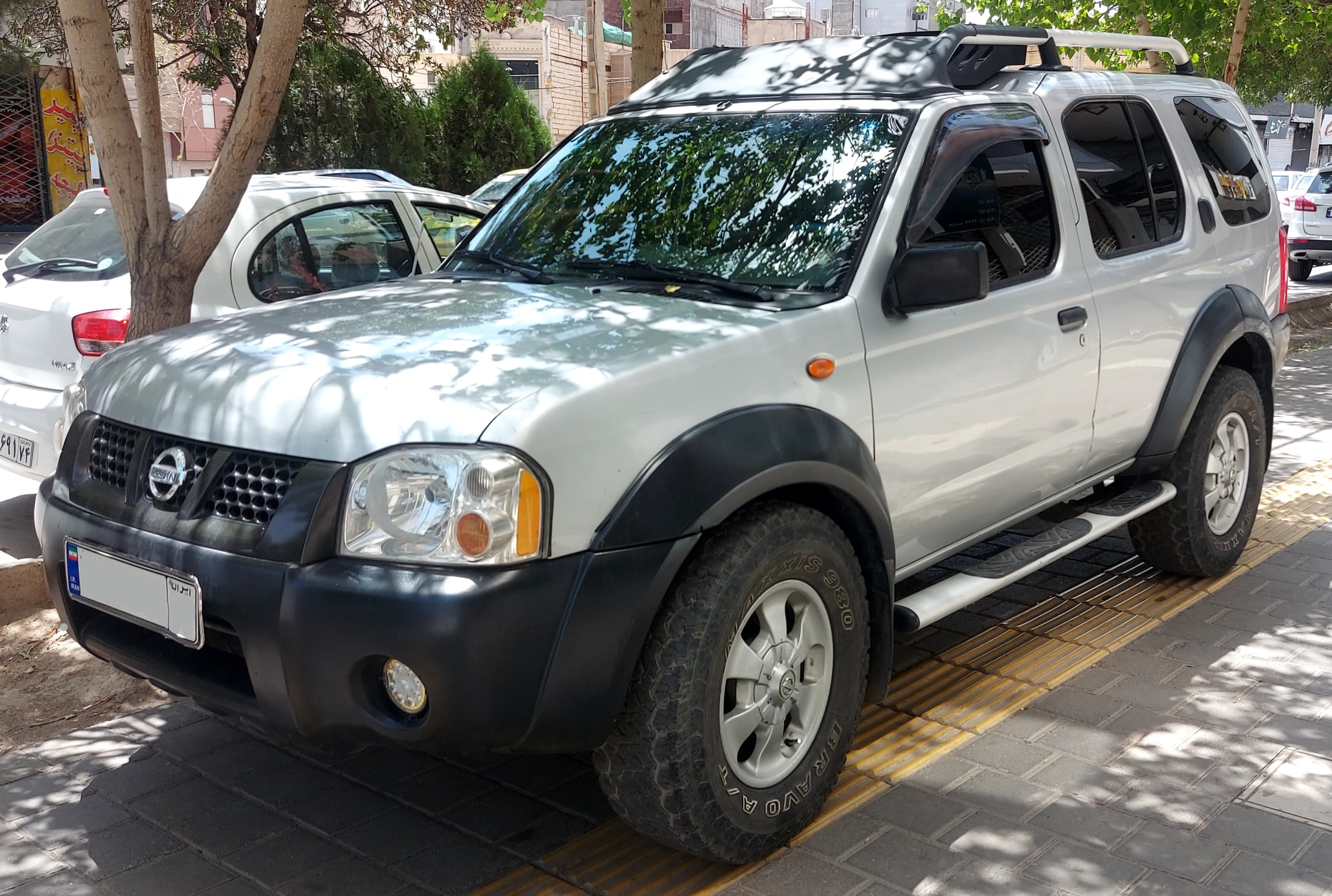
Nissan Roniz

Nissan Roniz rear view

=== Dongfeng Oting ===
Dongfeng Motors produced a Chinese version of the first generation Xterra called the Oting from 2007 to 2015. It was available with the 2.4-liter 4G64 and 4G69 or a 2.5-liter turbo-diesel engine paired with a 5-speed manual gearbox.

In comparison to pricing, the Chinese market Nissan Paladin was priced at 159,800 to 244,800 RMB (25,264 to US$38,702) while the Oting was priced at 119,800 to 154,800 RMB (18,940 to US$24,473). Trim levels for the Paladin were called the 2WD S, 2WD C, 2WD L, 2WD E, 4WD S, 4WD C, 4WD L and 4WD E. Trim levels for the Oting were called the China III MT L, China III MT E, China III AT L, China IV MT L, China IV MT E, Diesel 2WD and the Diesel 4WD.

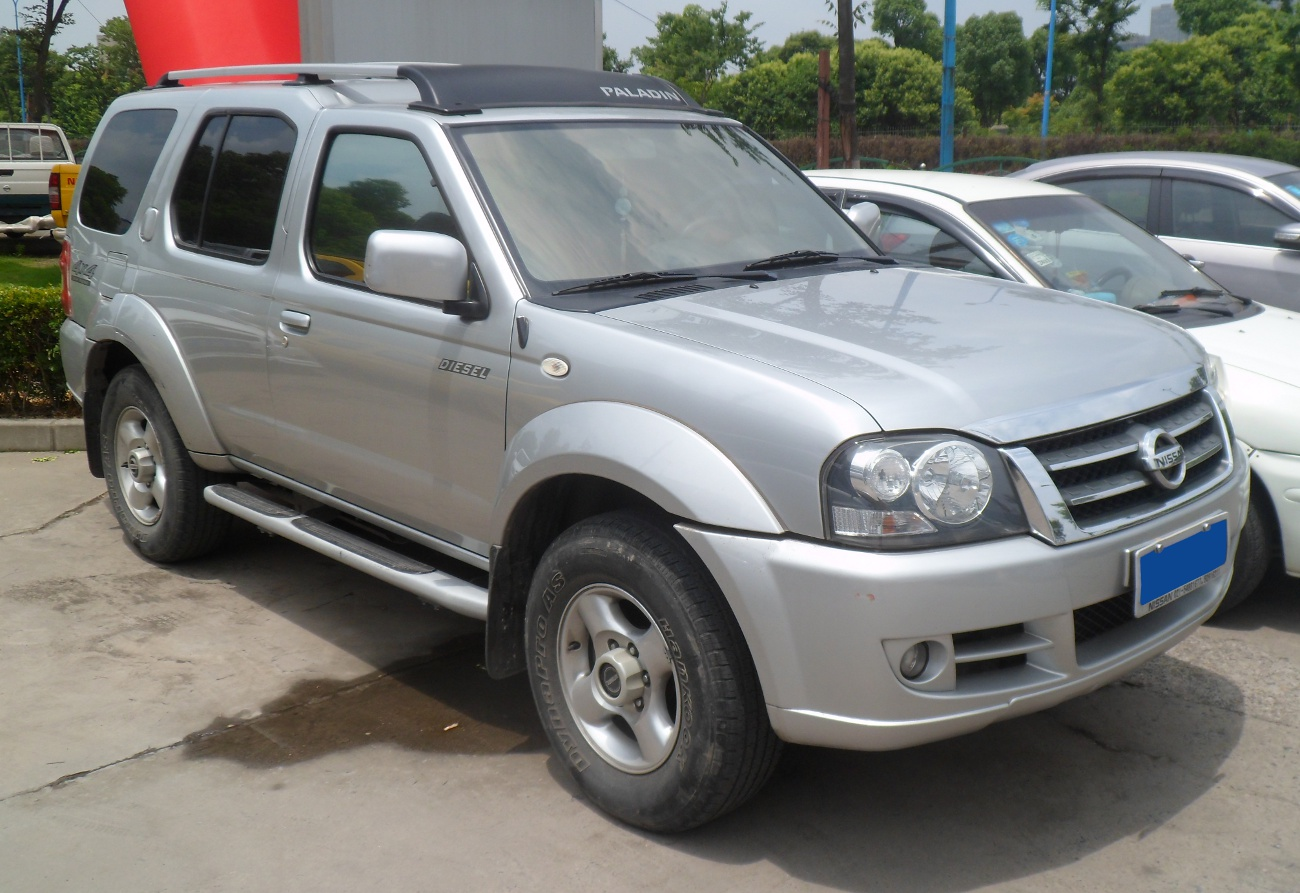
Dongfeng Oting with Nissan badge

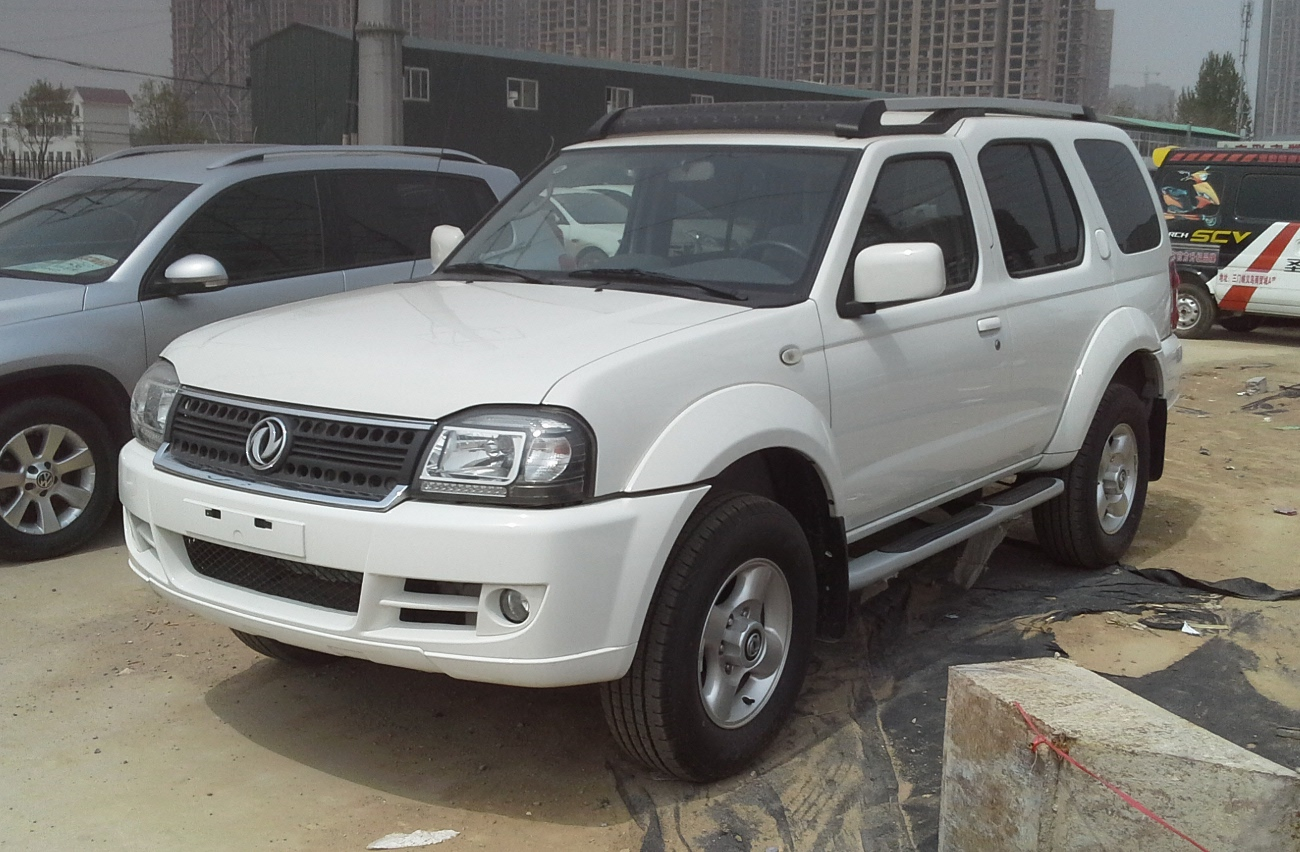
Dongfeng Oting

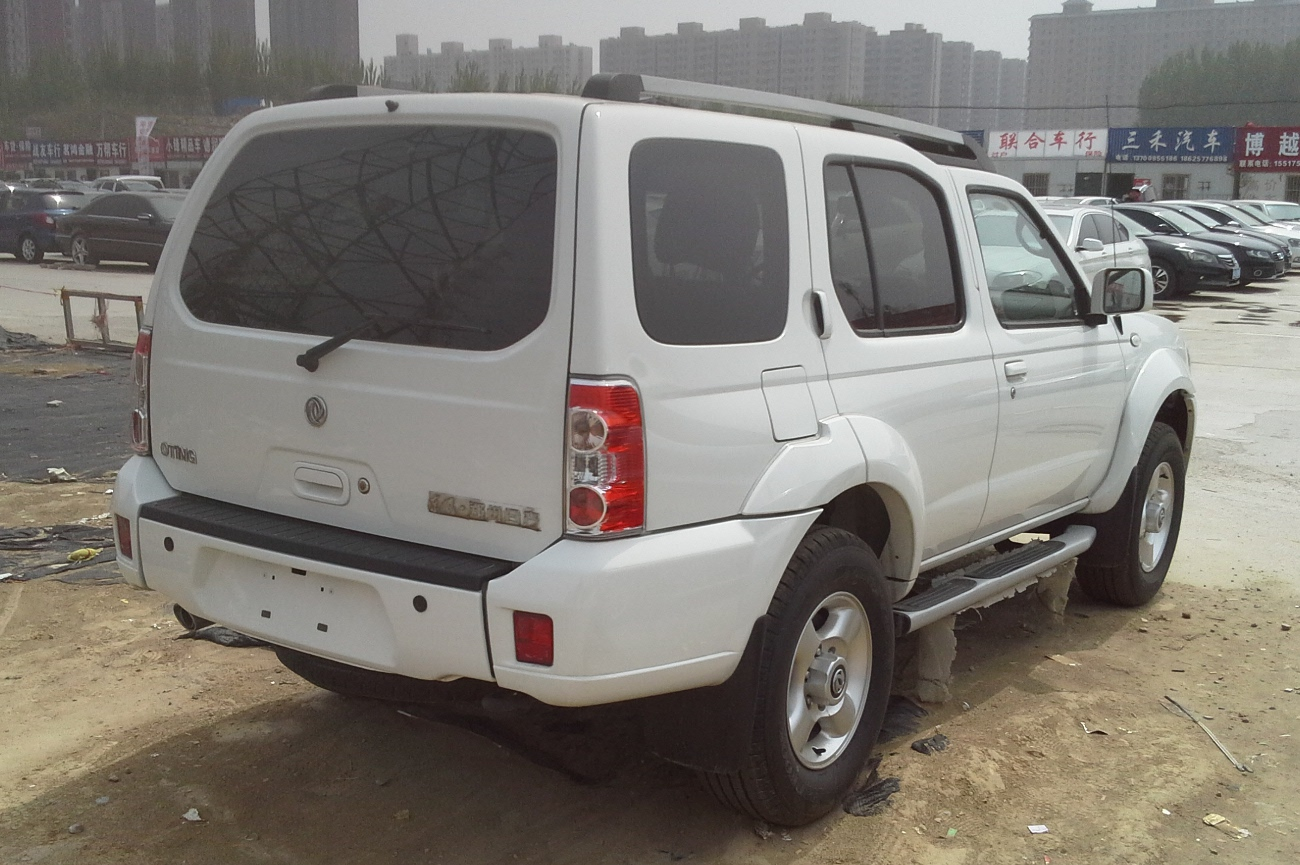
Dongfeng Oting rear view

== Sales ==
Calendar year	United States	Canada
2002	79,779	N/A
2003	67,799	N/A
2004	66,690	1,407
2005	72,447	2,799
2006	62,325	2,183
2007	51,355	1,469
2008	33,579	800
2009	16,455	613
2010	20,523	1,040
2011	18,221	1,258
2012	18,679	931
2013	17,766	1,070
2014	16,505	991
2015	10,672	1,707
2016	38	227
2017	1	–

(Source: US sales figures 2005-17 only; Canada 2012-2016 only.)
