= Aquacycling =

Watersport

Aquabiking (also called Aqua cycling) is the combination of water sports and cycling sports. Two activities share the term:

- One is an underwater indoor cycling, and
- the other is a race featuring swimming and cycling stages.

== See also ==
- Aquathlon – swimming and running
- International Triathlon Union
