= Marjolaine Pierré =

French triathlete (born 1999)

Personal information
- Born: 29 October 1999 (age 27) Reims, France

Sport
- Country: France
Medal record
Women's triathlon
Representing France
World Triathlon Long Distance Championships
Gold medal – first place	2023 Ibiza	Individual
Gold medal – first place	2025 Pontevedra	Individual
Gold medal – first place	2026 Abu Dhabi	Individual
Ironman 70.3 European Championships
Silver medal – second place	2026 Jönköping	Individual

Marjolaine Pierré (born 29 October 1999) is a French professional triathlete specialising in the long- and 70.3 distances. She is a three-time champion of the World Triathlon Long Distance Championships, which she won in 2023, 2025 and 2026.

== Early life ==
Originally from Reims, Pierré relocated to the island of Réunion at the age of 11. She pursued her studies in Aix-en-Provence, where she earned a bachelor's degree in accounting and management, followed by a master's degree at the University of Nice. She began her athletic journey with gymnastics before moving on to triathlon, a sport her parents were passionate about.

== Career ==
In May 2023, Pierré won the World Triathlon Long Distance Championships in Ibiza. She spoke about the difficulties she had faced managing the following season, including experiencing burnout in early 2024, before returning to a high level of competition that same summer.

In September 2024, Pierré finished in fourth place at the Ironman World Championship in Nice, with a time of 9:09:34. In June 2025, she won the World Triathlon Long Distance Championships in Pontevedra for the second time. In November 2025, she competed at the Ironman 70.3 World Championship in Marbella, with a time of 4:23:55.

In June 2026, Pierré competed in the Ironman 70.3 European Championship in Jönköping and won the silver medal. In November 2026, she competed in the World Triathlon Long Distance Championships in Abu Dhabi and won for the third time.

== Personal life ==
Pierré has been in relationship with Clément Mignon since 2021. Together, they finished in third place at the 2022 Triathlon Couples World Championship in Tierra Verde, Florida.
