= Péter Szilágyi =

Péter Szilágyi may refer to:

- Péter Szilágyi (footballer) (born 1988), Hungarian football player
- Péter Szilágyi (conductor) (1954–2013), Hungarian music conductor and politician
- Péter Szilágyi (politician) (born 1981), Hungarian jurist and politician
