= Rubén Ruzafa =

Spanish cyclist

Ruben Ruzafa
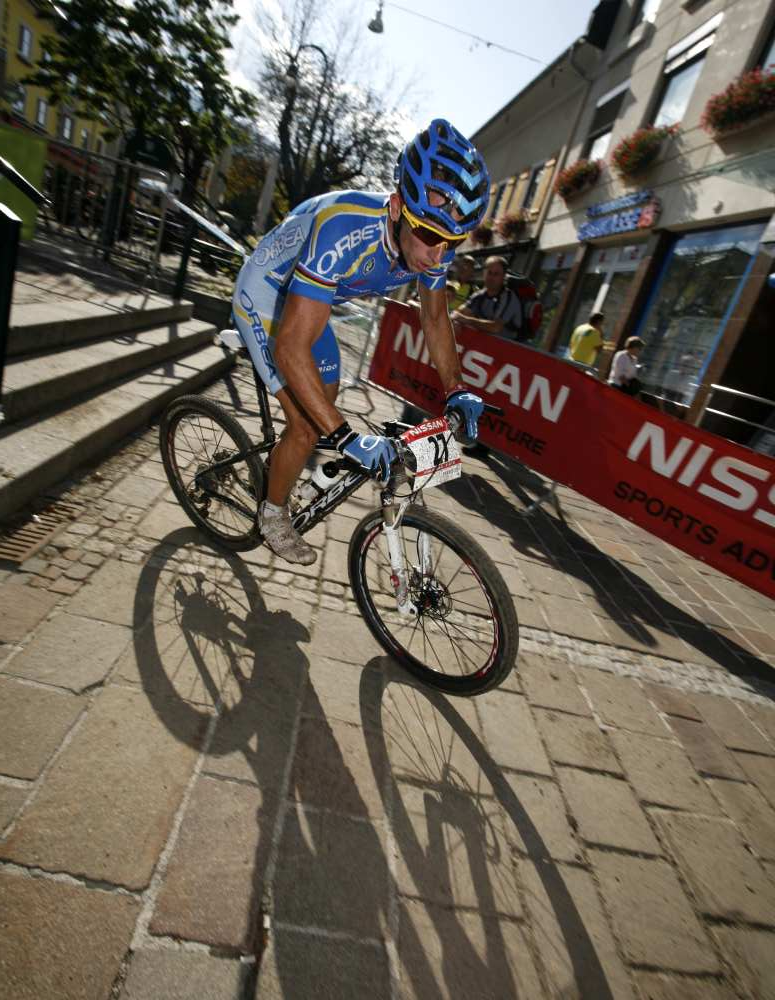

Personal information
- Full name: Rubén Ruzafa Cueto
- National team: Spain
- Born: September 9, 1984 (age 41) Valencia, Spain

Sport
- Country: Spain
- Sport: Triathlon, Cyclo-cross, Mountain biking
Medal record
Men's triathlon
Representing Spain
World Triathlon Cross Championships
Gold medal – first place	2018	Elite
Gold medal – first place	2016	Elite
Gold medal – first place	2015	Elite
Gold medal – first place	2014	Elite
Silver medal – second place	2019	Elite
Silver medal – second place	2017	Elite
Silver medal – second place	2013	Elite
Bronze medal – third place	2021	Elite
XTERRA Triathlon World Championships
Gold medal – first place	2014	Elite
Gold medal – first place	2013	Elite
Gold medal – first place	2008	Elite
Silver medal – second place	2016	Elite
Bronze medal – third place	2021	Elite
Bronze medal – third place	2019	Elite
Bronze medal – third place	2017	Elite
Bronze medal – third place	2015	Elite

Rubén Ruzafa Cueto (born 9 September 1984 in Valencia) is a professional triathlete, cyclo-cross and mountain bike cyclist. He is a four-time World Triathlon Cross world champion and a three-time XTERRA Triathlon world champion.

== Major results ==
=== Cyclo-cross ===
2006
1st U23 National Cyclo-cross Championships

=== Mountain ===
2004
1st U23 National Cross-country Championships
2005
1st World Team Relay Championships (with José Antonio Hermida, Oliver Avilés and Rocio Gaminal)
1st U23 National Cross-country Championships
2006
1st U23 National Cross-country Championships
2008
1st National Cross-country Championships

=== Triathlon ===
2008
1st Xterra World Championships
2013
1st Xterra World Championships
2014
1st World Cross Triathlon Championships
1st Xterra World Championships
2015
1st World Cross Triathlon Championships
2016
1st World Cross Triathlon Championships
1st European Cross Triathlon Championships
