= Francisco Serrano (triathlete) =

Mexican triathlete (born 1980)

Personal information
- Full name: Francisco Serrano Plowells
- Born: 4 May 1980 (age 46) Monterrey, Mexico
- Height: 1.80 m (5 ft 11 in)
- Weight: 71 kg (157 lb)

Sport
- Country: Mexico

Francisco Serrano Plowells (born 4 May 1980 in Monterrey) is a triathlete from Mexico. He competed at the 2008 Summer Olympics in Beijing, where he placed forty-fourth in the men's triathlon, with a time of 1:54:46, and at the 2011 Pan American Games in Guadalajara, where he finished eighteenth in the same event, with his personal best of 1:53:04.

At the peak of his career, Serrano has won six Pan American Cup titles in over fifty competitions, including five in his home turf.
