= Emma Pallant =

British theatre and television actress

Emma Pallant is a British theatre and television actress. She is known for classical work at Shakespeare's Globe, The Royal Shakespeare Company, and Regent's Park theatres, with notable roles including Jaques (As You Like It), Beatrice (Much Ado About Nothing), and Imogen (Cymbeline). Pallant is also known for her appearances in various UK television dramas, including Casualty, Father Brown and Holby City.

== Early life and career ==
Pallant was born in Nottingham, and studied at Exeter and Essex Universities.

== Stage ==
- Ravens: Spassky vs Fischer – (Hampstead Theatre) as Regina (premiere – by Tom Morton-Smith)
- An Enemy of the People (Nottingham Playhouse) as Hovstad (premiere of new version by Rebecca Lenkiewicz, starring Alex Kingtson)
- Intra Muros – UK Premiere (The Park) as Jane (UK premiere – by Alexis Michalik, nominated for the 2019 Offie for Best Performance Ensemble
- A Christmas Carol (RSC) as Mrs Cratchit (premiere of new version – by David Edgar, with Phil Davis)
- Lava (Nottingham Playhouse and Fifth Word) as Vicky (premiere – by James Fritz)
- William Wordsworth (ETT and Theatre by the Lake) as Dorothy Wordsworth (premiere by Nicholas Pierpan)
- Much Ado About Nothing (Shakespeare's Globe) as Beatrice (directed by Max Webster – Globe Theatre, UK, European, US, and South American Tours)
- It Just Stopped (Orange Tree Theatre) as Beth (UK premiere by Stephen Sewell)
- As You Like It (Shakespeare's Globe) as Jaques (directed by James Dacre – Globe Theatre, UK and European Tour)
- A Midsummer Night's Dream (Shakespeare's Globe) as Titania (directed by Bill Buckhurst)
- Cherry Orchard (Birmingham Rep) as Varya (directed by Rachel Kavanaugh, starring Josie Lawrence)
- Macbeth (Shakespeare's Globe) as Lady Macbeth
- Spanish Golden Age Season – (RSC – Swan Theatre, Stratford, Playhouse Theatre, West End and Teatro Espagnol, Madrid, Spain as part of Festival de Otoño, 2004)
- His Dark Materials (Birmingham Rep and UK Tour) as Ruta Skadi, Mrs Lonsdale (revival)
- Katherine Desouza (Birmingham Rep) as Fay (Premiere by Nick Stafford)
- Cymbeline (Regent's Park Theatre) as Imogen (directed by Rachel Kavanaugh)
- Precious Bane – (Pentabus) as Prue Sarn – (premiere by Bryony Lavery)
- Romeo and Juliet (New Vic Theatre) as Juliet

== Television ==
Television Roles Include:
Title	Role	Network	Notes
Casualty	Dr. Isabel Roberts	BBC	Series 33, Episode 19
Holby	Imogen Compton	BBC	Past Imperfect
Father Brown	Peggy Hardwick	BBC	The Penitent Man
Casualty	Susie Reardon	BBC	Sweetie
Doctors	Linda Burke	BBC	Purity – Parts I and II
Holby	Emily Evans	BBC	Losing Game
