= Guijo de Granadilla =

- municipality
- Coat of arms

- Location of Guijo de Granadilla in Extremadura Location of Guijo de Granadilla in Spain.
- Coordinates: 40°12′N 6°10′W
- Country: Spain
- Autonomous community: Extremadura
- Province: Cáceres
- Comarca: Tierra de Granadilla

Government
  - Mayor: Raúl García Lorenzo

Area
  - Total: 74.55 km^{2} (28.78 sq mi)
- Elevation: 390 m (1,280 ft)

Population (2025-01-01)
  - Total: 497
  - Density: 6.67/km^{2} (17.3/sq mi)
- Time zone: UTC+1 (CET)
  - Summer (DST): UTC+2 (CEST)
- Website: www.guijodegranadilla.es

Guijo de Granadilla is a municipality located in the province of Cáceres, Extremadura, Spain. It is located at 32 kilometers from Plasencia.

== See also ==
- List of municipalities in Cáceres
