= Anna Medvedeva =

Russian cross-country skier

Personal information
- Nationality: Russia
- Born: 30 July 1989 (age 36)

Sport
- Sport: Skiing

World Cup career
- Seasons: 1 – (2017)
- Indiv. starts: 5
- Indiv. podiums: 0
- Team starts: 2
- Team podiums: 0
- Overall titles: 0 – (67th in 2017)
- Discipline titles: 0

Anna Yevgenyevna Medvedeva (Russian: Анна Евгеньевна Медведева; born 30 July 1989) is a Russian cross-country skier who competes internationally with the Russian national team.

She competed at the FIS Nordic World Ski Championships 2017 in Lahti, Finland.

== Cross-country skiing results ==
All results are sourced from the International Ski Federation (FIS).

=== World Championships ===
Year	Age	10 km individual	15 km skiathlon	30 km mass start	Sprint	4 × 5 km relay	Team sprint
2017	27	—	33	31	—	—	—

=== World Cup ===
==== Season standings ====
Season	Age	Discipline standings			Ski Tour standings		
Season	Age	Overall	Distance	Sprint	Nordic Opening	Tour de Ski	World Cup Final
2017	27	67	49	64	—	—	—
