= Cross triathlon =

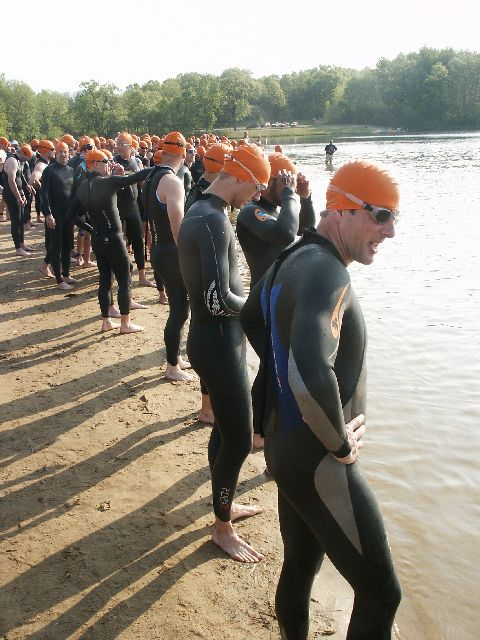
Triathletes lined up ready to start the swimming stage in a cross triathlon in 2008.

Cross triathlon, or off-road triathlon, is a form of triathlon, or three-stage race, consisting of a swim stage, mountain-biking stage, and a trail-running stage.

Cross triathlons are distinguished from conventional triathlons in that the terrain for the cycling and running stages are generally unpaved, rough, and hilly. They require different techniques than conventional triathlon races, and in particular the athletes employ mountain bikes rather than road bikes.

A cross triathlon requires a higher degree of technical biking skill, as opposed to the high speed and endurance demands of road biking in a road triathlon. Distances for the bike portion of an off-road are much less relevant than for a road triathlon. An off-road bike course may have several severe climbs and descents. It may also have a high degree of technicality, meaning the number, pitch and sharpness of turns through trees, rocks, logs, streams and other obstacles on the bike trail. Because the vertical climbs and technical demands of an off-road course greatly reduce a biker's speed, and because the amount of climbing and technicality vary greatly from one off-road course to another, estimating times for an off-road bike course merely by distance is not reliable.

Cross triathlon swim courses are normally similar to those of road triathlons. Each type of triathlon usually requires competitors to swim a minimum of 800 meters and typically 1500 meters in a lake, river or ocean.

Off-road run courses often follow part of the off-road bike course, and so often require trail running up and down hills or mountain sides, through forests, streams, riverbeds and other natural and occasionally man-made obstacles. The run distance is at least 5 kilometers and normally 10 kilometers. Again, as in off-road biking, predicting a finish time purely based on distance will not be accurate, due to the climbing and trail turns and obstacles preventing a runner from reaching speeds usually achieved on the road.

The International Triathlon Union conducts an annual Cross Triathlon Championship race annually. Additionally, the XTERRA Triathlon is a private off-road series and concluding with a championship each year in Maui.
