= XTERRA Triathlon =

Series of cross triathlon races

XTERRA is a series of cross triathlon and other off road races races, i.e. three-sport races which include swimming, mountain biking, and trail running. XTERRA-branded triathlons, mountain biking, and running races are owned by the for-profit XTERRA Sports Limited, LLC. The XTERRA race series is the best-known series of cross triathlons, and is considered by most to be the de facto world championship of the sport.

== History ==
It began in 1996 on the Hawaiian island of Maui as the Aquaterra, and was later renamed the XTERRA. Japanese automaker Nissan licensed the name from the triathlon series for their own 1999-2015 sport utility vehicle — and was the race series' primary sponsor from 1998 to 2006, when the two companies parted ways.

It was announced in November 2017 that XTERRA Sports Unlimited, LLC acquired TEAM Unlimited, LLC, the company operating XTERRA events.

== Organization ==
The XTERRA has two primary divisions, professional and "age-groupers". In the professional division athletes compete for cash prizes and sponsorships. The age-group division was created for those who still want to compete but have no aspirations to become professional athletes. Both divisions compete in a points series, where athletes accumulate points by placing in the top fifteen positions of any race in which they compete.

Several events known as XTERRA Championships Series offer more points due to their larger draws. In the United States, there are championships for each region of the country. These venues also offer a "sport" version of the race where contestants complete races that are typically half the distance of the full version.

== Race format ==
As an off-road race, the distances can vary widely depending on the terrain available. The target distances are as follows:

- Full Distance: 1.5 km swim, 30 km mountain biking, 11 km trail run
- Sprint Distance: 500 m swim, 15 km mountain biking, 5 km trail Run

The largest difference between the XTERRA race and a regular Triathlon is in the biking section. Though less than the standard 40k distance (in a regular Triathlon), XTERRA has steeper, more aggressive inclines for a shorter distance, usually between 27-30k, over rough terrain.

In the United States the sport distances are often used as miles yielding a 1/2 mile (805 m) swim, 15 mile (24 km) mountain bike, and a 5-mile (8-km) trail run.

== See also ==
- Duathlon
- Triathlon
