= 2025 World Triathlon Cup =

World Triathlon Cup

Series details
- Races: 13/14

Men's World Cup
- Most wins: 3: Maxime Hueber-Moosbrugger (FRA)

Women's World Cup
- Most wins: 3: Valentina Riasova (AIN)

World Triathlon Cup (former ITU Triathlon World Cup)
← 2024	2026 →

The 2025 World Triathlon Cup was a series of triathlon races in 2025 organised and recognised by World Triathlon. The competition represented the second tier of season-long draft-legal standard and sprint distance racing organised by tWorld Triathlon for elite-level triathletes, below the 2025 World Triathlon Championship Series which crowned the season-long world champion. There were fourteen events held in total, the majority held over a distance of 1500 m swim, 40 km cycle, 10 km run (an 'Olympic-distance' triathlon). The final event of the fourteen was held for women only.

The second event, in London, was a unique indoor Super Tri E event in a multi-race supersprint format, and represented the 2025 World Championships in that discipline. Although a series of Super Tri E (formerly called the Arena Games Triathlon) races were held in 2025, only the London event was treated as part of the World Triathlon Cup circuit.

== Venues ==
Event	Date	Venue	Country	Format
1	23 February	Napier	New Zealand	Sprint
2	5 April	London	Great Britain	Super Tri E
3	10 May	Chengdu	China	Standard
4	24 May	Samarkand	Uzbekistan	Standard
5	22 June	Huatulco	Mexico	Sprint
6	29 June	Saidia	Morocco	Standard
7	6 July	Tiszaujvaros	Hungary	Sprint
8	4 October	Rome	Italy	Sprint
9	2 November	Viña del Mar	Chile	Sprint
10*	9 November	San Pedro de la Paz	Chile	Sprint
10*	9 November	Miyazaki	Japan	Sprint
12	15 November	Tongyeong	Korea	Sprint
13	16 November	Florianopolis	Brazil	Sprint
14	7 December	Dubai	United Arab Emirates	Sprint

== Results ==
=== Men ===
Date	Location	Gold	Silver	Bronze
Feb 23	Napier (New Zealand)	David Cantero del Campo ^{(es)} Spain	Brayden Mercer; Australia	Callum McClusky; Australia
Apr 05	London (United Kingdom)	Maxime Hueber-Moosbrugger; France	Chase McQueen; United States	Maciej Bruzdziak; Poland
May 10	Chengdu (China)	Reese Vannerson ^{(es)} United States	Shachar Sagiv; Israel	Brandon Copeland; Australia
May 24	Samarkand (Uzbekistan)	Maxime Hueber-Moosbrugger; France	Márton Kropkó; Hungary	Mathis Beaulieu; Canada
Jun 22	Huatulco (Mexico)	Shachar Sagiv; Israel	Alejandro Rodriguez Diez; Cuba	Kuba Gajda; Poland
Jun 29	Saïdia (Morocco)	Oliver Conway; Great Britain	Tyler Mislawchuk; Canada	John Reed; United States
Jul 5-6	Tiszájúváros (Hungary)	Csongor Lehmann; Hungary	Igor Dupuis; France	Márk Dévay; Hungary
Oct 04	Rome (Italy)	Arnaud Mengal; Belgium	Izan Edo Aguilar; Spain	Nathan Grayel; France
Nov 02	Viña del Mar (Chile)	Manoel Messias; Brazil	João Nuno Batista; Portugal	David Cantero del Campo ^{(es)} Spain
Nov 09	San Pedro de la Paz (Chile)	Manoel Messias; Brazil	David Cantero del Campo ^{(es)} Spain	Sergio Baxter Cabrera; Spain
Nov 09	Miyazaki (Japan)	Max Studer; Switzerland	Maxime Hueber-Moosbrugger; France	Michael Gar; Great Britain
Nov 15	Tongyeong (South Korea)	Maxime Hueber-Moosbrugger; France	Vetle Bergsvik Thorn; Norway	Shachar Sagiv; Israel
Nov 15-16	Florianópolis (Brazil)	David Cantero del Campo ^{(es)} Spain	Igor Dupuis; France	Miguel Tiago Silva; Portugal

=== Women ===
Date	Location	Gold	Silver	Bronze
Feb-23	Napier (New Zealand)	Desirae Ridenour; Canada	Emma Jeffcoat; Australia	Ainsley Thorpe; New Zealand
Apr-05	London (United Kingdom)	Cassandre Beaugrand; France	Beth Potter; Great Britain	Julia Bröcker; Germany
May-10	Chengdu (China)	Valentina Riasova; Individual Neutral Athletes	Roksana Slupek; Poland	Sara Guerrero Manso; Spain
May-24	Samarkand (Uzbekistan)	Diana Isakova; Individual Neutral Athletes	Lea Coninx; France	Costanza Arpinelli; Italy
Jun-22	Huatulco (Mexico)	Carolina Velásquez; Colombia	Erika Ackerlund; United States	Elizabeth Bravo; Ecuador
Jun-29	Saïdia (Morocco)	Diana Isakova; Individual Neutral Athletes	Danielle Orie; United States	Ilaria Zane; Italy
Jul 5-6	Tiszájúváros (Hungary)	Lisa Tertsch; Germany	Jolien Vermeylen; Belgium	Tilda Månsson; Sweden
Oct-04	Rome (Italy)	Carina Reicht; Austria	Sandra Dodet; France	Franka Rust; Germany
Nov-02	Viña del Mar (Chile)	Jeanne Lehair; Luxembourg	Sara Guerrero Manso; Spain	Rosa Elena Martinez Melchior; Venezuela
Nov-09	San Pedro de la Paz (Chile)	Miriam Casillas García; Spain	Jeanne Lehair; Luxembourg	Sophia Howell; Canada
Nov-09	Miyazaki (Japan)	Valentina Riasova; Individual Neutral Athletes	Jessica Fullagar; Great Britain	Tilly Anema; Great Britain
Nov-15	Tongyeong (South Korea)	Tilly Anema; Great Britain	Diana Isakova; Individual Neutral Athletes	Charlotte Derbyshire; Australia
Nov 15-16	Florianópolis (Brazil)	Sara Guerrero Manso; Spain	Marta Pintanel Raymundo; Spain	Miriam Casillas García; Spain
Dec-07	Dubai (United Arab Emirates)	Valentina Riasova; Individual Neutral Athletes	Hanna Maksimava; Individual Neutral Athletes	Dominika Peszleg; Hungary

== Medal table ==
Overall, end of season ;

Rank	Nation	Gold	Silver	Bronze	Total
–	Individual Neutral Athletes (AIN)	5	2	0	7
1	France (FRA)	4	5	1	10
2	Spain (ESP)	4	4	4	12
3	Great Britain (GBR)	2	2	2	6
4	Brazil (BRA)	2	0	0	2
5	United States (USA)	1	3	1	5
6	Canada (CAN)	1	1	2	4
6	Hungary (HUN)	1	1	2	4
8	Israel (ISR)	1	1	1	3
9	Belgium (BEL)	1	1	0	2
9	Luxembourg (LUX)	1	1	0	2
11	Germany (GER)	1	0	2	3
12	Austria (AUT)	1	0	0	1
12	Colombia (COL)	1	0	0	1
12	Switzerland (SUI)	1	0	0	1
15	Australia (AUS)	0	2	3	5
16	Poland (POL)	0	1	2	3
17	Portugal (POR)	0	1	1	2
18	Cuba (CUB)	0	1	0	1
18	Norway (NOR)	0	1	0	1
20	Italy (ITA)	0	0	2	2
21	Ecuador (ECU)	0	0	1	1
21	New Zealand (NZL)	0	0	1	1
21	Sweden (SWE)	0	0	1	1
21	Venezuela (VEN)	0	0	1	1
Totals (24 entries)		27	27	27	81
