= 2022 World Triathlon Cup =

World Triathlon Cup

Series details
- Races: 9

Men's World Cup
- Most wins: 1: nine athletes

Women's World Cup
- Most wins: 2 :Sandra Dodet (FRA)

World Triathlon Cup
← 2021	2023 →

The 2022 World Triathlon Cup was the 32nd season of the World Triathlon Cup, the second-tier international series for triathlon organised by World Triathlon, below the World Triathlon Championship Series which crowned the season-long world champion. . The season featured nine completed rounds across four continents, opening in Arzachena on 28 May and concluding in Viña del Mar on 13 November 2022.

== Effect of covid pandemic ==
Although international travel largely resumed in 2022, lingering border controls and quarantine requirements stemming from the COVID-19 pandemic in East Asia led to the cancellation or postponement of four scheduled stops.

The planned season opener in Miyazaki (12–13 March) was cancelled in January due to strengthened Japanese border and visa restrictions, though Miyazaki returned to host its traditional autumn fixture in October. In May, the rounds in Osaka (7–8 May) and Weihai (24–25 September) were cancelled—the latter following formal requests from local organisers over China's mandatory "14+7" hotel quarantine policy. Additionally, the race in Haeundae (originally scheduled for 30 April – 1 May and later rescheduled to 22 October) was cancelled.

=== Cancelled events ===
Original date	Venue	Country	Reason
12–13 March	Miyazaki	Japan	COVID-19 pandemic (Japanese border and visa restrictions)
30 April – 1 May	Haeundae	South Korea	COVID-19 pandemic (rescheduled to 22 October before cancellation)
7–8 May	Osaka	Japan	COVID-19 pandemic (postponed/cancelled)
24–25 September	Weihai	China	COVID-19 pandemic (mandatory quarantine restrictions)

== Race results ==
=== Men ===
Event	Location	Gold	Silver	Bronze
28 May	Arzachena, (Italy)	Jonathan Brownlee; Great Britain	Manoel Messias; Brazil	Tom Richard; France
19 June	Huatulco, (Mexico)	Genís Grau; Spain	Tyler Mislawchuk; Canada	Miguel Hidalgo; Brazil
24 July	Pontevedra, (Spain)	Sergio Baxter Cabrera; Spain	Antonio Serrat Seoane; Spain	Max Studer; Switzerland
28 August	Bergen, (Norway)	Dorian Coninx; France	Kristian Blummenfelt; Norway	Vetle Bergsvik Thorn; Norway
3 September	Valencia, (Spain)	Manoel Messias; Brazil	Mario Mola; Spain	Matthew McElroy; United States
11 September	Karlovy Vary, (Czech Republic)	Csongor Lehmann; Hungary	Matthew McElroy; United States	Lasse Lührs; Germany
15 October	Tongyeong, (South Korea)	Matthew McElroy; United States	Gábor Faldum; Hungary	Samuel Dickinson; Great Britain
29 October	Miyazaki, (Japan)	Gianluca Pozzatti; Italy	Alberto González García; Spain	Ricardo Batista; Portugal
13 November	Viña del Mar, (Chile)	David Castro Fajardo; Spain	Diego Moya; Chile	Jawad Abdelmoula; Morocco

=== Women ===
Event	Location	Gold	Silver	Bronze
28 May	Arzachena, (Italy)	Sandra Dodet; France	Julie Derron; Switzerland	Luisa Baptista; Brazil
18 June	Huatulco, (Mexico)	Annika Koch; Germany	Emy Legault; Canada	Bianca Seregni; Italy
24 July	Pontevedra, (Spain)	Petra Kuříková; Czech Republic	Lisa Tertsch; Germany	Sandra Dodet; France
28 August	Bergen, (Norway)	Tilda Månsson; Sweden	Jolien Vermeylen; Belgium	Kate Waugh; Great Britain
3 September	Valencia, (Spain)	Lisa Tertsch; Germany	Anahí Álvarez Corral; Mexico	Léonie Périault; France
11 September	Karlovy Vary, (Czech Republic)	Léonie Périault; France	Bianca Seregni; Italy	Summer Rappaport; United States
15 October	Tongyeong, (South Korea)	Audrey Merle; France	Annika Koch; Germany	Mathilde Gautier; France
29 October	Miyazaki, (Japan)	Alberte Kjær Pedersen; Denmark	Ilaria Zane; Italy	Olivia Mathias; Great Britain
13 November	Viña del Mar, (Chile)	Sandra Dodet; France	Gina Sereno; United States	María Carolina Velásquez; Colombia

== Medal table ==
2022 World Triathlon Cup medal table
Rank	Nation	Gold	Silver	Bronze	Total
1	France	5	0	4	9
2	Spain	3	3	0	6
3	Germany	2	2	1	5
4	United States	1	2	2	5
5	Italy	1	2	1	4
6	Brazil	1	1	2	4
7	Hungary	1	1	0	2
8	Great Britain	1	0	3	4
9	Czech Republic	1	0	0	1
9	Denmark	1	0	0	1
9	Sweden	1	0	0	1
12	Canada	0	2	0	2
13	Norway	0	1	1	2
13	Switzerland	0	1	1	2
15	Belgium	0	1	0	1
15	Chile	0	1	0	1
15	Mexico	0	1	0	1
18	Colombia	0	0	1	1
18	Morocco	0	0	1	1
18	Portugal	0	0	1	1
Totals (20 entries)		18	18	18	54

== Multiple medalists ==
No overall World Cup winmer was crowned in 2022, as had been the case since 2009. However the following athletes won two or more medals during the season. Sandra Dodet of France was the only athlete to win multiple legs.

Rank	Athlete	Gold	Silver	Bronze	Total
1	Sandra Dodet (FRA)	2	0	1	3
2	Matthew McElroy (USA)	1	1	1	3
3	Annika Koch (GER)	1	1	0	2
3	Manoel Messias (BRA)	1	1	0	2
3	Lisa Tertsch (GER)	1	1	0	2
6	Léonie Périault (FRA)	1	0	1	2
7	Bianca Seregni (ITA)	0	1	1	2
