= 2024 World Triathlon Cup =

World Triathlon Cup

Series details
- Races: 13

Men's World Cup
- Most wins: 1: 13 athletes

Women's World Cup
- Most wins: 1: 13 athletes

World Triathlon Cup (former ITU Triathlon World Cup)
| ← 2023 | 2025 → |

The 2024 World Triathlon Cup was a series of triathlon races in 2024 organised and recognised by World Triathlon. The competition represented the second tier of season-long draft-legal standard and sprint distance racing organised by tWorld Triathlon for elite-level triathletes, below the 2024 World Triathlon Championship Series which crowned the season-long world champion. There were thirteen events held in total, the majority held over a distance of 1500 m swim, 40 km cycle, 10 km run (an 'Olympic-distance' triathlon).

== Results ==
=== Men ===
| Date | Location | Gold | Silver | Bronze |
|---|---|---|---|---|
| 24 Feb | Napier (New Zealand) | Callum McClusky ^{(es)} Australia | Hayden Wilde; New Zealand | Alberto González; Spain |
| 23 Mar | Hong Kong | Alberto González; Spain | Antonio Serrat; Spain | Kenji Nener; Japan |
| 20 Apr | Wollongong (Australia) | Luke Willian; Australia | Jamie Riddle; South Africa | Diego Moya; Chile |
| 29 Apr | Chengdu (China) | Max Stapley; Great Britain | Jonas Schomburg; Germany | Tayler Reid; New Zealand |
| 18 May | Samarkand (Uzbekistan) | Connor Bentley; Great Britain | Yanis Seguin; France | Jonas Schomburg; Germany |
| 18–19 May | Huatulco (Mexico) | Richard Murray; Netherlands | Mathis Beaulieu; Canada | John Reed; United States |
| 6–7 Jul | Tiszaujvaros (Hungary) | Csongor Lehmann; Hungary | Connor Bentley; Great Britain | Valentin Morlec; France |
| 8 Sep | Karlovy Vary (Czech Republic) | John Reed; United States | Casper Stornes; Norway | Kevin Viñuela ^{(es)} Spain |
| 14 Sep | Valencia (Spain) | David Cantero del Campo; Spain | Callum McClusky ^{(es)} Australia | Sergio Baxter Cabrera; Spain |
| 5 Oct | Rome (Italy) | Yanis Seguin; France | Luke Willian; Australia | Baptiste Passemard; France |
| 26 Oct | Tongyeong (South Korea) | Dylan McCullough; New Zealand | David Cantero del Campo; Spain | Maciej Bruzdziak; Poland |
| 8–9 Nov | Miyazaki (Japan) | Maxime Hueber-Moosbrugger; France | Ben Dijkstra; Great Britain | Kenji Nener; Japan |
| 9–10 Nov | Brasilia (Brazil) | Manoel Messias; Brazil | Callum McClusky ^{(es)} Australia | Sergio Baxter Cabrera; Spain |

=== Women ===
| Date | Location | Gold | Silver | Bronze |
|---|---|---|---|---|
| 24 Feb | Napier (New Zealand) | Sophie Linn; Australia | Sophie Alden; Great Britain | Olivia Mathias; Great Britain |
| 23 Mar | Hong Kong | Siân Rainsley; Great Britain | Katie Zaferes; United States | Kirsten Kasper; United States |
| 20 Apr | Wollongong (Australia) | Tilda Månsson^{(sv)} Sweden | Carolina Velásquez; Colombia | Ainsley Thorpe; New Zealand |
| 29 Apr | Chengdu (China) | Julie Derron; Switzerland | Tilda Månsson^{(sv)} Sweden | Roksana Slupek; Poland |
| 18 May | Samarkand (Uzbekistan) | Lena Meißner; Germany | Jessica Fullagar; Great Britain | Tilda Månsson^{(sv)} Sweden |
| 18–19 May | Huatulco (Mexico) | Alberte Kjær Pedersen; Denmark | Rachel Klamer; Netherlands | Solveig Løvseth; Norway |
| 6–7 Jul | Tiszaujvaros (Hungary) | Annika Koch; Germany | Vicky Holland; Great Britain | Diana Isakova; Individual Neutral Athletes |
| 8 Sep | Karlovy Vary (Czech Republic) | Maya Kingma; Netherlands | Petra Kurikova; Czech Republic | Gina Sereno; United States |
| 14 Sep | Valencia (Spain) | Lisa Tertsch; Germany | Olivia Mathias; Great Britain | Candice Denizot; France |
| 5 Oct | Rome (Italy) | Nina Eim; Germany | Alissa König ^{(de)} Switzerland | Jolien Vermeylen; Belgium |
| 26 Oct | Tongyeong (South Korea) | Jolien Vermeylen; Belgium | Summer Rappaport; United States | Siân Rainsley; Great Britain |
| 8–9 Nov | Miyazaki (Japan) | Gwen Jorgensen; United States | Alissa König ^{(de)} Switzerland | Jolien Vermeylen; Belgium |
| 9–10 Nov | Brasilia (Brazil) | Rosa Maria Tapia Vidal; Mexico | Sandra Dodet; France | Tamara Gorman; United States |

== Medal table ==
Overall, end of season ;

| Rank | Nation | Gold | Silver | Bronze | Total |
|---|---|---|---|---|---|
| 1 | Germany (GER) | 4 | 1 | 1 | 6 |
| 2 | Great Britain (GBR) | 3 | 6 | 2 | 11 |
| 3 | Australia (AUS) | 3 | 3 | 0 | 6 |
| 4 | Spain (ESP) | 2 | 2 | 4 | 8 |
| 4 | United States (USA) | 2 | 2 | 4 | 8 |
| 6 | France (FRA) | 2 | 2 | 3 | 7 |
| 7 | Netherlands (NED) | 2 | 1 | 0 | 3 |
| 8 | Switzerland (SUI) | 1 | 2 | 0 | 3 |
| 9 | New Zealand (NZL) | 1 | 1 | 2 | 4 |
| 10 | Sweden (SWE) | 1 | 1 | 1 | 3 |
| 11 | Belgium (BEL) | 1 | 0 | 2 | 3 |
| 12 | Brazil (BRA) | 1 | 0 | 0 | 1 |
| 12 | Denmark (DEN) | 1 | 0 | 0 | 1 |
| 12 | Hungary (HUN) | 1 | 0 | 0 | 1 |
| 12 | Mexico (MEX) | 1 | 0 | 0 | 1 |
| 16 | Norway (NOR) | 0 | 1 | 1 | 2 |
| 17 | Canada (CAN) | 0 | 1 | 0 | 1 |
| 17 | Colombia (COL) | 0 | 1 | 0 | 1 |
| 17 | Czech Republic (CZE) | 0 | 1 | 0 | 1 |
| 17 | South Africa (RSA) | 0 | 1 | 0 | 1 |
| 21 | Japan (JPN) | 0 | 0 | 2 | 2 |
| 21 | Poland (POL) | 0 | 0 | 2 | 2 |
| 23 | Chile (CHI) | 0 | 0 | 1 | 1 |
| – | Individual Neutral Athletes (AIN) | 0 | 0 | 1 | 1 |
| Totals (23 entries) | | 26 | 26 | 26 | 78 |
