= 2026 European Triathlon Championships =

2026 edition of the European Triathlon Championships

- Venue: Tarragona, Spain
- Dates: 13–14 June 2026

Champions
- Men: Oliver Conway (GBR)
- Women: Lisa Tertsch (GER)

The 2026 Europe Triathlon Championships, known colloquially as the European Triathlon Championships was the 41st edition of the European Triathlon Championships, held in Tarragona, Spain, on 13 and 14 June 2026 to crown the continental champion over the standard distance.

== Format ==
The competition was organised by Europe Triathlon over the now standard Olympic triathlon distance of a 1,500 m (1,600 yd) swim, a 40 km (25 mi) cycle, and a 10 km (6.2 mi) run.

The championships were held simultaneously with the 2026 Europe Triathlon Para Championships and age-group championships.

== Medal summary ==
Event	Gold		Silver		Bronze	
Men's individual	Oliver Conway; Great Britain	1:47:08	Michael Gar; Great Britain	1:47:44	Roberto Sánchez Mantecón; Spain	1:48:00
Women's individual	Lisa Tertsch; Germany	2:00:56	Jolien Vermeylen; Belgium	2:00:58	Valentina Riasova; Russia	2:01:03

== Results ==
=== Men ===
Rank	Athlete	Nation	Swim	T1	Bike	T2	Run	Overall time
1st place, gold medalist(s)	Oliver Conway	Great Britain	18:12	1:12	57:08	0:47	29:50	1:47:08
2nd place, silver medalist(s)	Michael Gar	Great Britain	17:36	1:04	58:42	0:46	29:38	1:47:44
3rd place, bronze medalist(s)	Roberto Sanchez Mantecon	Spain	18:17	1:09	57:05	0:54	30:38	1:48:00
4	Antonio Serrat Seoane	Spain	18:13	1:12	57:57	0:45	30:13	1:48:19
5	Márk Dévay	Hungary	17:27	1:12	57:52	0:47	31:12	1:48:29
6	Tjebbe Kaindl	Austria	17:59	1:05	57:28	0:48	31:16	1:48:34
7	Izan Edo Aguilar	Spain	18:18	1:08	57:58	0:53	30:25	1:48:40
8	Ian Pennekamp	Netherlands	18:13	1:09	57:09	0:48	31:27	1:48:44
9	Pablo Isotton	France	17:38	1:08	58:35	0:48	30:40	1:48:46
10	Denis Kolobrodov	Russia	18:02	1:06	58:15	0:51	30:44	1:48:57
11	Zsombor Dévay	Hungary	18:07	1:10	57:15	0:50	31:41	1:49:01
12	Grigory Antipov	Russia	18:11	1:11	58:03	0:51	30:52	1:49:06
13	Harry Leleu	Great Britain	18:14	1:08	57:57	0:48	31:05	1:49:11
14	Benedikt Bettin	Germany	18:06	1:07	58:07	0:46	31:09	1:49:14
15	Louis Vitiello	France	18:15	1:12	58:36	0:45	30:30	1:49:16
16	Gergely Kiss	Hungary	17:58	1:11	58:13	0:49	31:12	1:49:22
17	Arnaud Mengal	Belgium	18:30	1:06	58:31	0:50	30:40	1:49:35
18	Alberto Gonzalez Garcia	Spain	17:30	1:07	58:48	0:50	31:27	1:49:41
19	Ibe Baelde	Belgium	18:32	1:10	58:25	0:50	30:49	1:49:44
20	Ben Dijkstra	Netherlands	17:56	1:10	58:14	0:46	31:44	1:49:48
21	Eduardo Blanco Mollá	Spain	17:58	1:12	58:14	0:49	31:41	1:49:52
22	Gregor Payet	Luxembourg	18:35	1:08	58:21	0:47	31:29	1:50:18
23	Solomon Okrafo-Smart	Great Britain	18:05	1:11	58:08	0:51	32:18	1:50:30
24	Lucas Cambresy	Luxembourg	18:05	1:14	58:05	0:50	32:25	1:50:37
25	Eirik Berling Grande	Norway	17:53	1:10	58:20	0:50	32:28	1:50:39
26	Jose Ferreira	Portugal	18:26	1:13	58:28	0:50	31:47	1:50:41
27	Bence Bicsák	Hungary	18:24	1:15	58:26	0:47	31:55	1:50:45
28	Nathan Grayel	France	18:27	1:09	58:28	0:47	32:01	1:50:49
29	Maciej Bruzdziak	Poland	17:34	1:11	58:38	0:53	32:41	1:50:55
30	Nils Serre Gehri	France	18:02	1:08	58:55	0:47	32:14	1:51:04
31	Petter Ellingsbø	Norway	18:19	1:13	58:36	0:50	32:24	1:51:21
32	Jonas Osterholt	Germany	18:02	1:09	58:10	0:48	33:39	1:51:46
33	Gjalt Panjer	Netherlands	18:10	1:04	58:09	0:49	33:37	1:51:47
34	Gustavo Do Canto	Portugal	18:21	1:13	58:31	0:44	33:09	1:51:56
35	Miguel Espuna Larramona	Italy	17:34	1:10	58:35	0:51	34:07	1:52:16
36	Thomas Hansmaennel	France	18:23	1:12	58:31	0:46	33:41	1:52:30
37	Gregor Rasva	Estonia	17:32	1:10	59:24	0:49	33:43	1:52:37
38	Gültigin Er	Turkey	18:17	1:15	58:35	0:53	33:53	1:52:52
39	Zalán Hóbor	Hungary	17:28	1:10	58:44	0:44	34:52	1:52:56
40	Martin Demuth	Czech Republic	18:13	1:14	58:37	0:53	34:07	1:53:03
41	Lasse Lührs	Germany	18:24	1:11	58:31	0:51	36:09	1:55:04
42	Johannes Sikk	Estonia	19:36	1:12	1:01:52	0:48	32:41	1:56:07
43	Afonso Ferreira	Portugal	18:37	1:13	1:02:55	0:49	32:54	1:56:24
44	Enes Kizilcik	Turkey	18:27	1:10	1:03:05	0:54	33:00	1:56:34
45	Armin Angerjärv	Estonia	18:34	1:16	1:02:49	0:49	33:33	1:56:58
46	Theo Marti	Luxembourg	18:06	1:11	1:03:28	0:50	33:59	1:57:31
47	Vitalii Vorontsov	Ukraine	19:24	1:11	1:02:08	0:52	34:14	1:57:48
48	Veikka Saren	Finland	19:34	1:12	1:01:55	0:50	34:35	1:58:03
49	Aurelien Carre	Luxembourg	19:30	1:18	1:01:56	0:49	35:05	1:58:36
—	Shachar Sagiv	Israel	18:12	1:10	58:00	0:53	—	DNF
—	Sylvain Fridelance	Switzerland	18:08	1:13	58:43	0:51	—	DNF
—	Michał Oliwa	Poland	18:03	1:11	—	—	—	DNF
—	Joris Basslé	Belgium	18:12	1:12	57:59	0:51	—	DNF
—	Artjoms Gajevskis	Latvia	18:29	1:12	1:03:01	0:48	—	DNF
—	Filip Michalek	Czech Republic	18:32	1:15	1:02:56	0:51	—	DNF
—	Connor Bentley	Great Britain	18:01	1:10	—	—	—	DNF
—	Oliver Hostrup Sahlberg	Denmark	18:00	1:19	—	—	—	DNF
—	Oscar Lilja	Sweden	18:20	1:13	—	—	—	DNF
—	Andreas Nikolajsen	Denmark	17:41	1:08	—	—	—	DNF
—	Jens Smolders	Belgium	18:37	1:11	—	—	—	DNF
—	Panagiotis Bitados	Greece	18:06	1:07	58:13	0:59	—	DNF

=== Women ===
Rank	Athlete	Nation	Swim	T1	Bike	T2	Run	Overall time
1st place, gold medalist(s)	Lisa Tertsch	Germany	19:18	1:13	1:05:58	0:48	33:42	2:00:56
2nd place, silver medalist(s)	Jolien Vermeylen	Belgium	19:23	1:12	1:06:01	0:55	33:31	2:00:58
3rd place, bronze medalist(s)	Valentina Riasova	Russia	20:27	1:14	1:04:51	0:54	33:40	2:01:03
4	Roksana Slupek	Poland	19:25	1:15	1:05:52	0:54	33:51	2:01:14
5	Diana Isakova	Russia	19:38	1:15	1:05:42	0:54	34:39	2:02:06
6	Márta Kropkó	Hungary	19:15	1:13	1:06:00	0:53	34:53	2:02:11
7	Bianca Seregni	Italy	19:14	1:17	1:06:03	0:55	34:59	2:02:26
8	Franka Rust	Germany	20:26	1:12	1:04:51	0:50	35:18	2:02:35
9	Diana Dunajska	Slovakia	20:22	1:15	1:05:01	0:58	35:08	2:02:41
10	Candice Denizot	France	19:17	1:12	1:06:01	0:50	35:28	2:02:45
11	Sian Rainsley	Great Britain	19:19	1:16	1:05:55	0:55	35:21	2:02:46
12	Marta Pintanel Raymundo	Spain	19:59	1:18	1:05:20	0:57	35:24	2:02:56
13	Angelica Prestia	Italy	19:42	1:16	1:05:32	0:56	35:56	2:03:21
14	Beatrice Mallozzi	Italy	19:39	1:13	1:05:38	0:52	36:11	2:03:32
15	Tereza Zimovjanova	Czech Republic	20:21	1:17	1:04:57	1:01	36:13	2:03:47
16	Maria Tomé	Portugal	19:32	1:20	1:05:41	0:56	36:25	2:03:51
17	Katie Rodda	Great Britain	19:21	1:14	1:05:57	0:53	36:40	2:04:04
18	Ana Carballo Gómez	Spain	19:30	1:12	1:05:54	0:56	36:43	2:04:13
19	Cecilia Santamaria Surroca	Spain	19:29	1:20	1:05:45	0:56	36:50	2:04:18
20	Paola Sacchi	Italy	19:27	1:14	1:05:50	0:55	37:05	2:04:30
21	Jule Behrens	Germany	20:24	1:14	1:04:58	0:59	37:01	2:04:36
22	Helena Knaapi	Finland	20:24	1:18	1:04:35	0:55	37:43	2:04:53
23	Selina Klamt	Germany	19:33	1:17	1:05:47	0:55	37:26	2:04:55
24	Dana Prikrylova	Czech Republic	19:21	1:17	1:06:00	0:57	37:27	2:05:00
25	Therese Feuersinger	Austria	19:30	1:16	1:05:44	1:01	37:37	2:05:05
26	Magdalena Sudak	Poland	20:05	1:12	1:05:16	0:58	37:58	2:05:27
27	Margareta Vrablova	Slovakia	19:39	1:14	1:05:41	1:00	37:56	2:05:28
28	Mathilde Gautier	France	19:18	1:15	1:05:59	0:57	38:01	2:05:30
29	Sara Guerrero Manso	Spain	19:34	1:16	1:05:45	0:58	38:18	2:05:49
30	Matylda Wojakiewicz	Poland	20:16	1:14	1:07:19	0:54	36:10	2:05:51
31	Zuzana Michalickova	Slovakia	20:05	1:13	1:07:35	0:58	36:08	2:05:58
32	María Teresa Jiménez-Orta Guerrero	Spain	20:17	1:19	1:07:15	0:56	36:42	2:06:26
33	Clara Carlquist	Denmark	19:30	1:22	1:05:44	0:58	38:57	2:06:29
34	Annabel Morton	Great Britain	20:27	1:16	1:07:08	0:56	36:47	2:06:33
35	Mit Wittemans	Belgium	19:36	1:16	1:05:46	0:57	39:11	2:06:44
36	Iida Reini	Finland	19:38	1:16	1:07:58	0:55	37:16	2:07:00
37	Barbara De Koning	Netherlands	19:46	1:20	1:07:44	0:55	37:38	2:07:21
38	Hanna Maksimava	Belarus	20:54	1:16	1:08:37	0:53	35:48	2:07:25
39	Katrien Maes	Belgium	20:22	1:18	1:07:10	0:58	37:59	2:07:45
40	Matilde Silva Santos	Portugal	20:23	1:20	1:07:10	0:56	38:16	2:08:03
41	Babette Rosman	Netherlands	20:21	1:20	1:07:05	0:54	39:56	2:09:34
42	Zuzanna Sudak	Poland	20:03	1:13	1:07:34	0:52	40:36	2:10:16
43	Dominika Peszleg	Hungary	20:22	1:18	1:09:08	0:56	39:00	2:10:42
44	Bethany Cook	Great Britain	19:24	1:15	1:06:00	1:03	45:56	2:13:36
—	Daryna Moskalenko	Ukraine	20:03	1:17	1:09:29	0:56	—	DNF
—	Tjasa Vrtacic	Slovenia	19:59	1:14	1:05:21	0:53	—	DNF
—	Ilaria Zane	Italy	19:27	1:16	1:05:54	1:05	—	DNF
—	Madalena Amaral Almeida	Portugal	20:50	1:17	1:08:42	0:56	—	DNF
—	Heidi Juránková	Czech Republic	20:23	1:17	—	—	—	DNF
—	Julia Bröcker	Germany	20:26	1:19	1:07:03	0:56	—	DNF
—	Borbála Sarcia	Hungary	20:21	1:25	—	—	—	DNF
—	Liis Kapten	Estonia	20:25	1:15	—	—	—	DNF
—	Yeva Soroka	Ukraine	22:40	—	—	—	—	DNF
—	Mariana Vargem	Portugal	20:52	1:17	—	—	—	DNF
—	Nora Gmür	Switzerland	19:33	1:14	—	—	—	DNF
—	Alina Sinevich	Belarus	20:35	1:20	—	—	—	DNF

== Medal table ==
* Host nation (Spain)

Rank	Nation	Gold	Silver	Bronze	Total
1	Great Britain (GBR)	1	1	0	2
2	Germany (GER)	1	0	0	1
3	Belgium (BEL)	0	1	0	1
4	Russia (RUS)	0	0	1	1
4	Spain (ESP)*	0	0	1	1
Totals (5 entries)		2	2	2	6
