= 2023 World Triathlon Cup =

World Triathlon Cup

Series details
- Races: 14

Men's World Cup
- Most wins: 2: Tim Hellwig (Australia)

Women's World Cup
- Most wins: 4 : Gwen Jorgensen (United States)

World Triathlon Cup
← 2022	2024 →

The 2023 World Triathlon Cup was a series of triathlon races in 2023 organised and recognised by World Triathlon. The competition represented the second tier of season-long draft-legal standard and sprint distance racing organised by tWorld Triathlon for elite-level triathletes, below the 2023 World Triathlon Championship Series which crowned the season-long world champion. There were fourteen events held in total, the majority held over a distance of 1500 m swim, 40 km cycle, 10 km run (an 'Olympic-distance' triathlon).

== Results ==
=== Men ===
Event	Location	Gold	Silver	Bronze
26 Mar	New Plymouth (New Zealand)	Hayden Wilde; New Zealand	Tayler Reid; New Zealand	Ricardo Batista; Portugal
17 Jun	Huatulco (Mexico)	David Castro Fajardo; Spain	Tyler Mislawchuk; Canada	Aram Michell Peñaflor Moysen; Mexico
8-9 Jul	Tiszaujvaros (Hungary)	Csongor Lehmann; Hungary	Sergio Baxter Cabrera; Spain	Alberto Gonzalez Garcia; Spain
5 Aug	Yeongdo (South Korea)	Takumi Hojo; Japan	Max Stapley; Great Britain	Valentin Wernz; Germany
27 Aug	Weihai (China)	Crisanto Grajales; Mexico	Makoto Odakura; Japan	Lasse Nygaard Priester; Germany
2 Sep	Valencia (Spain)	David Cantero Del Campo; Spain	Lasse Nygaard Priester; Germany	Michele Sarzilla; Italy
10 Sep	Karlovy Vary (Czech Republic)	Morgan Pearson; United States	Márk Dévay; Hungary	Jonas Schomburg; Germany
1 Oct	Tangier (Morocco)	Pierre Le Corre; France	David Cantero Del Campo; Spain	Vetle Bergsvik Thorn; Norway
7 Oct	Rome (Italy)	Vasco Vilaça; Portugal	Arnaud Mengal; Belgium	Simon Henseleit; Germany
14 Oct	Chengdu (China)	Tim Hellwig; Germany	Aram Michell Peñaflor Moysen; Mexico	Rostislav Pevtsov; Azerbaijan
15 Oct	Brasilia (Brazil)	Miguel Hidalgo; Brazil	Antonio Serrat Seoane; Spain	Charles Paquet; Canada
21 Oct	Tongyeong (South Korea)	Tim Hellwig; Germany	Ricardo Batista; Portugal	Samuel Dickinson; Great Britain
28 Oct	Miyazaki (Japan)	Hugo Milner; Great Britain	Dylan McCullough; New Zealand	Lasse Nygaard Priester; Germany
12 Nov	Viña del Mar (Chile)	Manoel Messias; Brazil	Miguel Hidalgo; Brazil	Aram Michell Peñaflor Moysen; Mexico

=== Women ===
Event	Location	Gold	Silver	Bronze
26 Mar	New Plymouth (New Zealand)	Nicole Van Der Kaay; New Zealand	Ainsley Thorpe; New Zealand	Solveig Løvseth; Norway
	Huatulco (Mexico)	Anahi Alvarez Corral; Mexico	Gwen Jorgensen; United States	Mercedes Romero Orozco; Mexico
8-9 Jul	Tiszaujvaros (Hungary)	Tilda Månsson; Sweden	Noelia Juan; Spain	Jolien Vermeylen; Belgium
5 Aug	Yeongdo (South Korea)	Annika Koch; Germany	Romana Gajdošová; Slovakia	Erica Hawley; Bermuda
27 Aug	Weihai (China)	Bianca Seregni; Italy	Lisa Perterer; Austria	Ilaria Zane; Italy
2 Sep	Valencia (Spain)	Gwen Jorgensen; United States	Nina Eim; Germany	Marlene Gomez-Göggel ^{(de)} Germany
10 Sep	Karlovy Vary (Czech Republic)	Gwen Jorgensen; United States	Rachel Klamer; Netherlands	Marlene Gomez-Göggel ^{(de)} Germany
1 Oct	Tangier (Morocco)	Lisa Tertsch; Germany	Noelia Juan; Spain	Tilda Månsson; Sweden
7 Oct	Rome (Italy)	Nina Eim; Germany	Marlene Gomez-Göggel ^{(de)} Germany	Cathia Schär; Switzerland
14 Oct	Chengdu (China)	Bianca Seregni ^{(it)} Italy	Claire Michel; Belgium	Ilaria Zane; Italy
15 Oct	Brasilia (Brazil)	Alice Betto; Italy	Katie Zaferes; United States	Rosa Maria Tapia Vidal; Mexico
21 Oct	Tongyeong (South Korea)	Gwen Jorgensen; United States	Yuko Takahashi; Japan	Tereza Zimovjanova; Czech Republic
28 Oct	Miyazaki (Japan)	Bianca Seregni ^{(it)} Italy	Gwen Jorgensen; United States	Jeanne Lehair; Luxembourg
12 Nov	Viña del Mar (Chile)	Gwen Jorgensen; United States	Gina Sereno; United States	Vicky Holland; Great Britain

== Medal table ==
THe following is a table by nation of all the podium medals achieved throughout the season.

2023 World Triathlon Cup overall medal table
Rank	Nation	Gold	Silver	Bronze	Total
1	United States	5	4	0	9
2	Germany	5	3	7	15
3	Italy	4	0	3	7
4	Spain	2	5	1	8
5	New Zealand	2	3	0	5
6	Mexico	2	1	4	7
7	Brazil	2	1	0	3
8	Japan	1	2	0	3
9	Great Britain	1	1	2	4
10	Portugal	1	1	1	3
11	Hungary	1	1	0	2
12	Sweden	1	0	1	2
13	France	1	0	0	1
14	Belgium	0	2	1	3
15	Canada	0	1	1	2
16	Austria	0	1	0	1
16	Netherlands	0	1	0	1
16	Slovakia	0	1	0	1
19	Norway	0	0	2	2
20	Azerbaijan	0	0	1	1
20	Bermuda	0	0	1	1
20	Czech Republic	0	0	1	1
20	Luxembourg	0	0	1	1
20	Switzerland	0	0	1	1
Totals (24 entries)		28	28	28	84

== Multiple medalists ==
The following were the most successful athletes throughout the 2023 World Triathlon Cup season in terms of total medals won.

Rank	Athlete	Gold	Silver	Bronze	Total
1	Gwen Jorgensen (USA)	4	2	0	6
2	Bianca Seregni (ITA)	3	0	0	3
3	Tim Hellwig (GER)	2	0	0	2
4	David Cantero del Campo (ESP)	1	1	0	2
4	Nina Eim (GER)	1	1	0	2
4	Miguel Hidalgo (BRA)	1	1	0	2
7	Tilda Månsson (SWE)	1	0	1	2
8	Noelia Juan (ESP)	0	2	0	2
9	Marlene Gomez-Göggel (GER)	0	1	2	3
9	Aram Peñaflor Moysen (MEX)	0	1	2	3
9	Lasse Nygaard Priester (GER)	0	1	2	3
12	Ricardo Batista (POR)	0	1	1	2
13	Ilaria Zane (ITA)	0	0	2	2
