= 2026 World Triathlon Cup =

World Triathlon Cup

Series details
- Races: 18

World Triathlon Cup (former ITU Triathlon World Cup)
← 2025	2027 →

The 2026 World Triathlon Cup is a series of triathlon races in 2025 organised and recognised by World Triathlon. The competition represents the second tier of season-long draft-legal standard and sprint distance racing organised by World Triathlon for elite-level triathletes, below the 2026 World Triathlon Championship Series which crowned the season-long world champion. There were eighteen events scheduled in total, the majority held over the 'sprint' distance of 750 m swim, 20 km bike and 5 km run; the remainder were held over a distance of 1500 m swim, 40 km cycle, 10 km run (an 'Olympic-distance' triathlon).

Four of the legs of the World Cup also included mixed medley relay events.

== Venues ==
Event	Date	Venue	Country	Format	Mixed Relay
1	14 March	Lanzarote	Spain	Sprint	
2	21 March	Haikou	China	Sprint	
3	9-10 May	Chengdu	China	Sprint	yes
4	14 June	Huatulco	Mexico	Sprint	
5	27-28 June	Tiszaujvaros	Hungary	Sprint	
6	19-19 July	Edmonton, Alberta	Canada	Sprint	yes
7	2 August	Rio de Janeiro	Brazil	Sprint	
8	9 August	Asuncion	Paraguay	Standard	
9	3-4 October	Rome	Italy	Sprint	yes
10	17 October	Beijing	China	Standard	
11	24 October	Tongyeong	Korea	Sprint	
12	1 November	San Pedro de la Paz	Chile	Standard	
13	7-8 November	Hong Kong	Hong Kong China	Standard	yes
14	8 Novermber	Iquique	Chile	Sprint	
15	14-15 November	Miyazaki	Japan	Sprint	
16	22 November	Tauranga	New Zealand	Sprint	
17	27-28 November	Jeddah	Saudi Arabia	Sprint	
18	6 December	Dubai	United Arab Emirates	Sprint	

==== Men's ====
Event	Location	Gold	Silver	Bronze
1	Lanzarote; Sprint	David Cantero ^{(es)} Spain	Tim Hellwig; Germany	Jawad Abdelmoula; Morocco
2	Haikou; Sprint	Oliver Conway; Great Britain	Tim Hellwig; Germany	Hugo Milner; Great Britain
3	Chengdu; Sprint	Luke Willian; Australia	Nils Serre Gehri^{(fr)} France	Tyler Mislawchuk; Canada
4	Huatulco; Sprint	Tyler Mislawchuk; Canada	Sullivan Middaugh; United States	Vinicius Avi Santana; Brazil
5	Tiszaujvaros; Sprint	Csongor Lehmann; Hungary	Tom Lerno; France	Pelayo González; Spain
6	Edmonton, Alberta; Sprint	Solomon Okrafo-Smart; Great Britain	Tyler Mislawchuk; Canada	Reese Vannerson; United States
7	Rio de Janeiro; Sprint	Braxton Legg^{(es)} United States	Dylan McCullough; New Zealand	Mitch Kolkman; Netherlands
8	Asuncion; Standard	Dylan McCullough; New Zealand	Justus Töpper; Germany	Toby Powers; Australia
9	Rome; Sprint	Alex Yee; Great Britain	Martin Hubner; France	Tristan Douche; France
10	Beijing; Standard	Max Studer; Switzerland	Xiirui Zhang; China	Alberto González; Spain
11	Tongyeong; Sprint	Alberto González; Spain	Max Studer; Switzerland	Keller Norland; United States
12	San Pedro de la Paz; Standard	Morgan Pearson; United States	Louis Vitiello; France	Márton Kropkó; Hungary
13	Hong Kong; Standard	Nils Serre Gehri^{(fr)} France	Callum McClusky; Australia	David Castro ^{(es)} Spain
14	Iquique; Standard	David Cantero ^{(es)} Spain	Porter Middaugh; United States	Antonio Serrat; Spain
15	Miyazaki; Standard			
16	Tauranga; Standard			
17	Jeddah; Standard			
18	Dubai; Standard			

==== Women ====
Event	Location	Gold	Silver	Bronze
1	Lanzarote; Sprint	Nina Eim; Germany	Georgia Taylor-Brown; Great Britain	Laura Lindemann; Germany
2	Haikou; Sprint	Diana Isakova; Individual Neutral Athletes	Sophie Malowiecki; Australia	Sian Rainsley; Great Britain
3	Chengdu; Sprint	Laura Lindemann; Germany	Valentina Riasova; Individual Neutral Athletes	Kate Waugh; Great Britain
4	Huatulco; Sprint	Ana Maria Torres; Mexico	Kelly Wetteland; United States	Noelia Juan; Spain
5	Tiszaujvaros; Sprint	Fanni Szalai; Hungary	Taylor Knibb; United States	Tara Sosinski; Australia
6	Edmonton, Alberta; Sprint	Taylor Knibb; United States	Márta Kropkó; Hungary	Paola Sacchi; Italy
7	Rio de Janeiro; Sprint	Zuzana Michalickova; Slovakia	Kelly Wetteland; United States	Beatrice Mallozzi; Italy
8	Asuncion; Standard	Danielle Orie; United States	Angelica Prestia; Italy	Beatrice Mallozzi; Italy
9	Rome; Sprint	Diana Isakova; Individual Neutral Athletes	Tilda Månsson; Sweden	Taylor Spivey; United States
10	Beijing; Standard	Xinyu Lin; China	Márta Kropkó; Hungary	Kate Waugh; Great Britain
11	Tongyeong; Sprint	Xinyu Lin; China	Anqi Huang; China	Mathilde Gautier; France
12	San Pedro de la Paz; Standard	Marta Pintanel; Spain	Ana Carballo; Spain	Eva Daniels; Luxembourg
13	Hong Kong	Diana Isakova; Russia	Jeanne Lehair; Luxembourg	Anqi Huang; China
14	Iquique	Carolina Velásquez; Colombia	Taylor Knibb; United States	Marta Pintanel; Spain
15	Miyazaki			
16	Tauranga			
17	Jeddah			
18	Dubai			

==== Mixed relay ====
Event	Location	Gold	Silver	Bronze
1	Chengdu; Mixed relay	Spain; Ana Carballo; Pelayo González; Sara Guerrero; Antonio Serrat	Great Britain; Sian Rainsley; Max Stapley; Jessica Fullagar; Jack Willis	Canada; Isla Britton; Tyler Mislawchuk; Sophia Howell; Martin Sobey
2	Edmonton, Alberta; Mixed relay	Italy; Paola Sacchi; Miguel Espuna; Beatrice Mellozzi; Euan de Nigro	Canada; Sidney Clement; Tyler Mislawchuk; Isla Britton; Martin Sobey	France; Lea Coninx; Baptiste Passmarde; Candice Denizot; Nathan Grayel
3	Rome; Mixed relay	Great Britain; Olivia Mathias; Connor Bentley; Kate Waugh; Alex Yee	Italy; Paola Sacchi; Nicola Azzano; Bianca Seregni; Euan de Nigro	Portugal; Maria Tomé; João Nuno Batista; Mariana Vargem; Miguel Tiago Silva
4	Hong Kong; Mixed relay	Switzerland; Anouk Danna; Simon Westermann; Alissa König; Max Studer	Russia; Iana Chenskaia; Denis Kolobrodov; Diana Issakowa ^{(de)} Grigory Antipov	China; Xinyu Lin; Junjie Fan; Anqi Huang; Xirui Zhang

== Medal table ==
After race 14

Rank	Nation	Gold	Silver	Bronze	Total
1	Spain (ESP)	5	1	6	12
2	United States (USA)	4	6	3	13
3	Great Britain (GBR)	4	2	4	10
4	Germany (GER)	2	3	1	6
5	China (CHN)	2	2	2	6
6	Hungary (HUN)	2	2	1	5
7	Switzerland (SUI)	2	1	0	3
–	Individual Neutral Athletes (AIN)	2	1	0	3
8	France (FRA)	1	4	3	8
9	Italy (ITA)	1	2	3	6
10	Australia (AUS)	1	2	2	5
10	Canada (CAN)	1	2	2	5
12	New Zealand (NZL)	1	1	0	2
12	Russia (RUS)	1	1	0	2
14	Colombia (COL)	1	0	0	1
14	Mexico (MEX)	1	0	0	1
14	Slovakia (SVK)	1	0	0	1
17	Luxembourg (LUX)	0	1	1	2
18	Sweden (SWE)	0	1	0	1
19	Brazil (BRA)	0	0	1	1
19	Morocco (MAR)	0	0	1	1
19	Netherlands (NED)	0	0	1	1
19	Portugal (POR)	0	0	1	1
Totals (22 entries)		32	32	32	96

* Prior to November 2026, Russian athletes ran as neutrals. The bar on russian athletes representing their nation ended in November 2026.

== Multiple medalists ==
Top 10 multi-medalists at the 2026 World Triathlon Cup (after race 14)
Rank	Athlete	Nation	Gold	Silver	Bronze	Total
1	Diana Isakova	(Russia) / (Individual Neutral Athletes)	3	1	0	4
2	Max Studer	Switzerland	2	1	0	3
3	Xinyu Lin	China	2	0	1	3
4	Alex Yee	Great Britain	2	0	0	2
4	David Cantero	Spain	2	0	0	2
6	Tyler Mislawchuk	Canada	1	2	2	5
7	Taylor Knibb	United States	1	2	0	3
8	Paola Sacchi	Italy	1	1	1	3
9	Ana Carballo	Spain	1	1	0	2
9	Dylan McCullough	New Zealand	1	1	0	2
9	Euan de Nigro	Italy	1	1	0	2
9	Nils Serre Gehri	France	1	1	0	2
