= Triathlon at the 2023 Pan American Games – Men's =

Men's individual at the 2023 Pan American Games
- Venue: El Sol Beach
- Dates: November 2
- Competitors: 39 from 16 nations
- Winning time: 1:46.08

Medalists
Gold medal	Miguel Hidalgo	Brazil
Silver medal	Matthew McElroy	United States
Bronze medal	Crisanto Grajales	Mexico

The men's individual competition of the triathlon events at the 2023 Pan American Games was held on November 2 at El Sol Beach in Viña del Mar, Chile.

== Schedule ==
Date	Time	Round
November 2, 2023	15:00	Final

== Results ==
The results were as follows:

Rank	Triathlete	Nation	Time	Diff
1st place, gold medalist(s)	Miguel Hidalgo	Brazil	1:46:08	
2nd place, silver medalist(s)	Matthew McElroy	United States	1:46:09	+0:01
3rd place, bronze medalist(s)	Crisanto Grajales	Mexico	1:46:11	+0:03
4	Martin Sobey	Canada	1:46:31	+0:23
5	Seth Rider	United States	1:46:31	+0:23
6	Gaspar Riveros	Chile	1:46:58	+0:50
7	Tyler Smith	Bermuda	1:47:02	+0:54
8	Diego Moya	Chile	1:47:09	+1:01
9	Manoel Messias	Brazil	1:47:15	+1:07
10	Matthew Wright	Barbados	1:47:23	+1:15
11	Antônio Bravo Neto	Brazil	1:47:31	+1:23
12	Brock Hoel	Canada	1:47:49	+1:41
13	Kauê Willy	Brazil	1:48:06	+1:58
14	Chase McQueen	United States	1:48:40	+2:32
15	Aram Peñaflor	Mexico	1:48:46	+2:38
16	Luis Velasquez	Venezuela	1:49:11	+3:03
17	Rodrigo Gonzalez	Mexico	1:49:51	+3:43
18	Yhousman Perdomo	Venezuela	1:50:00	+3:52
19	Liam Donnelly	Canada	1:50:01	+3:53
20	Juan Andrade	Ecuador	1:50:52	+4:44
21	Gabriel Teran	Ecuador	1:51:56	+5:48
22	Federico Scarabino	Uruguay	1:52:16	+6:08
23	Ivan Anzaldo	Argentina	1:53:35	+7:27
24	Alvaro Campos	Costa Rica	1:54:13	+8:05
25	Alejandro Rodríguez	Cuba	1:54:40	+8:32
26	Brian Moya	Colombia	1:55:21	+9:13
27	Carlos Quinchara	Colombia	1:56:10	+10:02
	Jorge Cabinal	Independent Athletes Team	LAP	
	Kevin Milián	Cuba	LAP	
	Petter Vega	Panama	LAP	
	Rodrigo Leaño	Bolivia	LAP	
	Gerardo Vergara	Independent Athletes Team	LAP	
	Melvin Martínez	Dominican Republic	LAP	
	Janarold Martínez	Puerto Rico	LAP	
	Flavio Morandini	Argentina	DNF	
	Ramón Matute	Ecuador	DNS	
