= Triathlon at the 2023 Pan American Games – Mixed relay =

Mixed relay at the 2023 Pan American Games
- Venue: El Sol Beach
- Dates: November 4
- Competitors: 44 from 11 nations
- Winning time: 1:15:08

Medalists
Gold medal	Miguel Hidalgo; Djenyfer Arnold; Manoel Messias; Vittória Lopes	Brazil
Silver medal	Seth Rider; Erika Ackerlund; Matthew McElroy; Virginia Sereno	United States
Bronze medal	Brock Hoel; Emy Legault; Liam Donnelly; Dominika Jamnicky	Canada

The mixed relay competition of the triathlon events at the 2023 Pan American Games was held on November 4 at El Sol Beach in Viña del Mar, Chile.

== Schedule ==
Date	Time	Round
November 4, 2023	10:00	Final

== Results ==
The results were as follows:

Rank	Triathlete	Nation	Time	Notes
1st place, gold medalist(s)	Miguel Hidalgo; Djenyfer Arnold; Manoel Messias; Vittória Lopes	Brazil	1:15:08	
2nd place, silver medalist(s)	Seth Rider; Erika Ackerlund; Matthew McElroy; Virginia Sereno	United States	1:15.26	
3rd place, bronze medalist(s)	Brock Hoel; Emy Legault; Liam Donnelly; Dominika Jamnicky	Canada	1:15:36	
4	Crisanto Grajales; Lizeth Rueda; Aram Peñaflor; Rosa Tapia	Mexico	1:16:52	
5	Gabriel Terán; Elizabeth Bravo; Juan Andrade; Paula Jara	Ecuador	1:17:58	
6	Luis Velásquez; Rosa Martínez; Yhousman Perdomo; Genesis Ruiz	Venezuela	1:18:11	
7	Brian Moya; Diana Castillo; Carlos Quinchara; Carolina Velásquez	Colombia	1:18:45	
8	Diego Moya; Dominga Jacome; Gáspar Riveros; Catalina Salazar	Chile	1:18:56	
9	Alejandro Rodríguez; Leslie Amat; Kevin Milián; Niuska Figueredo	Cuba	1:19:07	
10	Flavio Morandini; Romina Biaglioli; Ivan Anzaldo; Moira Miranda	Argentina	1:19:28	
11	Jorge Cabinal; Marlen Aguilar; Gerardo Vergara; Bivian Díaz	Independent Athletes Team	1:28:06	
