= Triathlon at the 2013 Canada Summer Games =

Triathlon at the 2013 Canada Summer Games was held in Sherbrooke, Quebec. It was run from the 13 to 17 August. There were 3 events of triathlon.

== Medal table ==
The following is the medal table for triathlon at the 2013 Canada Summer Games.

* Host nation ( Quebec)

Rank	Nation	Gold	Silver	Bronze	Total
1	Quebec*	3	1	0	4
2	Alberta	1	2	1	4
3	Ontario	1	1	1	3
4	Manitoba	0	1	0	1
5	Saskatchewan	0	0	2	2
6	Nova Scotia	0	0	1	1
Totals (6 entries)		5	5	5	15

== Triathlon ==
Event	Gold		Silver		Bronze	
Men's individual	Xavier Grenier-Talavéra; Quebec	55:13.00	Tyler Mislawchuk; Manitoba	55:26.00	Conor Gillespie-Friesen; Nova Scotia	55:35.00
Men's 3 x relay	Quebec; Xavier Grenier-Talavéra; Francis Lefebvre; Alexis Lepage	58:28.00	Ontario; Austen Forbes; Myles Zagar; Aron Mohammadi	59:40.00	Alberta; Russell Pennock; Cooper Bentley; John Pexman	59:57.00
Women's individual	Emily Wagner; Alberta	1:03:10.00	Emy Legault; Quebec	1:03:27.00	Gabrielle Edwards; Saskatchewan	1:03:58.00
Women's 3 x relay	Quebec; Emy Legault; Karol-Ann Roy; Elisabeth Boutin	1:06:19.00	Alberta; Emily Wagner; Adeline Maunder; Jessie Lilly	1:07:39.00	Ontario; Samantha Klus; Sasha Boulton; Kirsten Vergara	1:07:51.00
Mixed relay	Ontario; Myles Zagar; Austen Forbes; Sasha Boulton; Samantha Klus	1:23:17.00	Alberta; Russell Pennock; John Pexman; Emily Wagner; Adeline Maunder	1:23:46.00	Saskatchewan; Robert Bigsby; Aidan Katz; Gabrielle Edwards; Anne Charles	1:24:21.00
