= Triathlon at the 2022 South American Games =

Triathlon competitions at the 2022 South American Games

- Venue: Playa San José
- Dates: October 2−4
- Nations: 11

Triathlon competitions at the 2022 South American Games in Asunción, Paraguay were held between October 2 and 4, 2022 at the Centro Acuático Nacional.

An individual event per gender and the mixed relay competition was contested. A total of 11 NOC's entered teams into the competitions. The gold medalists in the mixed relay qualified for the 2023 Pan American Games Triathlon competitions (2 athletes per gender).

== Medal summary ==
=== Medal table ===
* Host nation (Paraguay)

Rank	Nation	Gold	Silver	Bronze	Total
1	Brazil	3	2	1	6
2	Colombia	0	1	0	1
3	Chile	0	0	1	1
3	Ecuador	0	0	1	1
Totals (4 entries)		3	3	3	9

=== Medalists ===
Event	Gold		Silver		Bronze	
Men's individual	Miguel Hidalgo; Brazil	53:52	Manoel Messias; Brazil	54:07	Diego Moya; Chile	54:27
Women's individual	Luisa Baptista; Brazil	59:47	Vittória Lopes; Brazil	1:00:01	Djenyfer Arnold; Brazil	1:00:37
Mixed relay	Brazil; Luisa Baptista; Manoel Messias; Miguel Hidalgo; Vittória Lopes	1:17.22	Colombia; Carlos Quinchara; Carolina Velásquez; Diana Castillo; Hugo Ruiz	1:19.10	Ecuador; Elizabeth Bravo; Juan Andrade; Paula Jara; Ramon Matute	1:19.30
