= Eduard Isakov =

Russian politician (born 1973)

- Эдуард Исаков
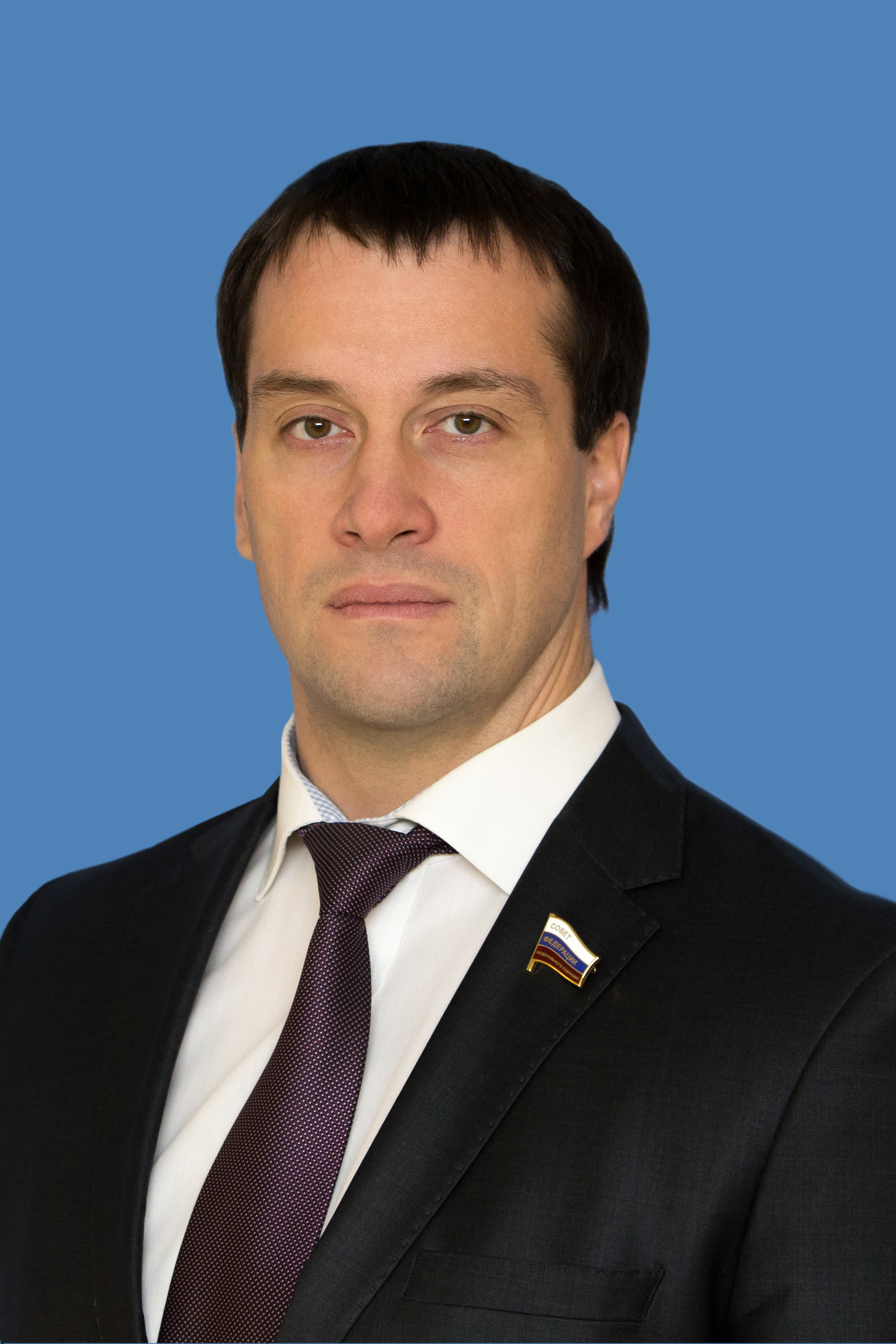
- Isakov in 2015

Senator from the Khanty-Mansi Autonomous Okrug
- In office 14 September 2015 – 8 September 2024
- Preceded by: Nikolay Fedoryak
- Succeeded by: Natalya Komarova

Personal details
- Born: Eduard Isakov; 4 October 1973 (age 52) Sverdlovsk, Russian Soviet Federative Socialist Republic, Soviet Union
- Party: United Russia
- Children: Diana Isakova
- Education: Russian State Vocational Pedagogical University

Eduard Vladimirovich Isakov (Russian: Эдуард Владимирович Исаков; born 4 October 1973) is a Russian politician who served as Senator from the Khanty-Mansi Autonomous Okrug from September 2015 to September 2024.

== Career ==
Eduard Isakov was born on 4 October 1973 in Sverdlovsk. In 2004, he graduated from the Russian State Vocational Pedagogical University. From 1991 to 1993, he served in the Kremlin Regiment. From 1994 to 1996, he worked at the Federal Protective Service. Starting from the end of the 1990s, he engaged professionally with powerlifting and participated in many Russian and international competitions. From 1997 to 2005, he also worked as a trainer-teacher in sports for the disabled at the children's and youth sports school in Yugorsk. From 2011 to 2015, Isakov served as a deputy of the Duma of Khanty-Mansi Autonomous Okrug – Yugra. On 14 September 2015, he became the senator from the Khanty-Mansi Autonomous Okrug.

== Family ==
Isakov openly supports the invasion of Ukraine and in April 2022 even suggested sending those against the war to "rebuild Donbass". On the contrary, Isakov's daughter, Diana Isakova, is known for her political activism. After the full-scale Russian invasion of Ukraine, she left the country and openly stated her opposition position. After leaving Russia, Isakova gave a number of interviews in which she described disagreements with her father on the issues of war and LGBT rights in Russia. In response, Isakov claimed that he does not communicate with Diana anymore since she had "sold her father, her family, her motherland, and left Russia".

== Sanctions ==
Eduard Isakov is under personal sanctions introduced by the European Union, the United Kingdom, the United States, Canada, Switzerland, Australia, Ukraine, New Zealand, for ratifying the decisions of the "Treaty of Friendship, Cooperation and Mutual Assistance between the Russian Federation and the Donetsk People's Republic and between the Russian Federation and the Luhansk People's Republic" and providing political and economic support for Russia's annexation of Ukrainian territories.
