= 2026 World Triathlon Duathlon Championships =

International duathlon competition in Abu Dhabi, United Arab Emirates

- Venue: Abu Dhabi, United Arab Emirates
- Dates: 14–15 November 2026

The 2026 World Triathlon Duathlon Championships were held from 14 to 15 November 2026 in Abu Dhabi, United Arab Emirates. Organized by World Triathlon, the event served as the opening discipline of the 2026 World Triathlon Multisports Championships .

The individual Elite, under–23, and Junior championships took place on Saturday, 14 November 2026, followed by the Paraduathlon, Age-Group Standard Distance, and 2x2 Mixed Relay championships on Sunday, 15 November 2026.

== Course and format ==
All races were contested on Hudayriyat Island, a coastal sports and endurance complex in Abu Dhabi. The individual Elite and under–23 races are contested as a single event, and were held over a standard run–bike–run format consisting of a 5 km (3.1 mi) opening run, a 30 km (19 mi) cycling leg, and a 5 km (3.1 mi) closing run.

Junior and Paraduathlon races were contested over the sprint distance (5 km (3.1 mi) run, 20 km (12 mi) bike, 2.5 km (1.6 mi) run), while Age-Group Standard Distance athletes raced over 10 km (6.2 mi), 40 km (25 mi), and 5 km (3.1 mi).

== Event summary ==
Elite / under–23 Men

In hot and windswept conditions, defending champion Benjamin Choquert of France led a tightly bunched pack through the opening 5 km run. Italian under–23 competitor Davide Menichelli exited the first transition quickly and launched a solo breakaway on the 30 km bike course. Belgium's Martin Oldenhove bridged across to Menichelli late on the third lap, and the pair built a one-minute advantage over the chasing group by the second transition.

On the final 5 km run, Menichelli pulled clear within the first 1,500 metres to win both the Elite and under–23 world titles in 1:10:04. Oldenhove finished 35 seconds behind in 1:10:39 to claim silver in both the Elite and under–23 divisions, while France's Adrien Pilleux recorded the fastest final run split (15:06) to surge past Dmitrii Karpeev for Elite bronze in 1:10:44.

Karpeev, seventh in the elite event, claimed the under–23 bronze medal.

Elite / under–23 Women

The women's race began with a tactical opening 5 km run that kept the top ten contenders within six seconds. An eight-woman lead group formed during the 30 km cycling segment, including Lisa Tertsch (Germany), Diana Isakova (Russia), Jasmijn Bakker (Netherlands), María Varo Zubiri (Spain), and Jeanne Dupont (Belgium).

On the closing 5 km run, Tertsch, Isakova, and Varo broke away at the front before Varo faded in the final two kilometres. Having finished fifth in the World Triathlon Championship Series Abu Dhabi sprint race won by Isakova a day earlier, Tertsch sat on Isakova's shoulder until 200 metres from the finish before sprinting clear to win gold in 1:22:03.

Isakova took silver five seconds back in 1:22:08, and Bakker rallied late to secure bronze in 1:22:27 ahead of Dupont and Varo.

Belgium's Camille Roman won the under–23 women's world title.

== Medal summary ==
The following table includes elite, elite junior and elite under-23 medalists only. both under-23 races were held within the main elite races.

Games	Gold		Silver		Bronze	
Elite
Men	Davide Menichelli; Italy	1:10:04	Martin Oldenhove; Belgium	1:10:39	Adrien Pilleux; France	1:10:44
Women	Lisa Tertsch; Germany	1:22:03	Diana Isakov; Russia	1:22:08	Jasmijn Bakker; Netherlands	1:22:27
Mixed 2x2 relay	Russia I Valentina Riasova; Dmitrii Karpeev	1:18:31	Netherlands I Jasmijn Bakker; Thomas Cremers	1:19:30	France II; Emma Wasser; Emile Blondel Hermant	1:19:55
Under-23
Men	Davide Menichelli; Italy	1:10:04	Martin Oldenhove; Belgium	1:10:39	Dmitrii Karpeev; Russia	1:10:57
Women	Camille Roman; Belgium	1:25:20	Islam Bkhibkhi; Morocco	1:34:32	Aya Bkhibkhi; Morocco	1:34:37
Junior
Boys	Alex Mandak; Slovakia	57:18	Aleksei Petrovskii; Russia	57:19	Arthur Baigidin; Russia	57:25
Girls	Laura Dugovičová; Slovakia	1:01:53	Natália Betáková; Slovakia	1:02:40	Zoe Hughes; Ireland	1:05:09
Mixed 2x2 junior relay	Russia; Sofia Tikhonova; Aleksei Petrovskii	1:27:26	Morocco; Doaa Izem; Omar Othmane	1:32:23	Mexico; Vivianne Cramer; Emilio Rendon	1:33:55

=== Medal table ===
* Host nation (United Arab Emirates)

Rank	Nation	Gold	Silver	Bronze	Total
1	Russia (RUS)	2	2	2	6
2	Slovakia (SVK)	2	1	0	3
3	Italy (ITA)	2	0	0	2
4	Belgium (BEL)	1	2	0	3
5	Germany (GER)	1	0	0	1
6	Morocco (MAR)	0	2	1	3
7	Netherlands (NED)	0	1	1	2
8	France (FRA)	0	0	2	2
9	Ireland (IRL)	0	0	1	1
9	Mexico (MEX)	0	0	1	1
Totals (10 entries)		8	8	8	24

== Elite races ==
=== Men ===
Rank	Athlete	Run 1	T1	Bike	T2	Run 2	Total time
1st place, gold medalist(s)	Davide Menichelli (ITA)	14:43	0:26	38:53	0:31	15:31	1:10:04
2nd place, silver medalist(s)	Martin Oldenhove (BEL)	14:45	0:29	38:47	0:30	16:08	1:10:39
3rd place, bronze medalist(s)	Adrien Pilleux (FRA)	14:44	0:31	39:46	0:37	15:06	1:10:44
4	Jonathan Wayaffe (BEL)	14:44	0:30	39:46	0:32	15:16	1:10:48
5	Vincent Bierinckx (BEL)	14:44	0:28	39:49	0:33	15:16	1:10:50
6	Emile Blondel Hermant (FRA)	14:44	0:30	39:48	0:33	15:18	1:10:53
7	Dmitrii Karpeev (RUS)	14:46	0:29	39:45	0:28	15:29	1:10:57
8	Arnaud Dely (BEL)	14:43	0:34	39:45	0:38	15:34	1:11:14
9	Mohamed Nemsi (MAR)	14:59	0:32	39:30	0:32	16:06	1:11:39
10	Roman Mineev (RUS)	14:44	0:29	39:48	0:31	16:12	1:11:44
11	Thomas Cremers (NED)	14:47	0:34	39:41	0:35	16:19	1:11:56
12	Sebastian Fuchs (AUT)	14:48	0:36	39:37	0:45	16:27	1:12:13
13	Jonathan Homberg (GER)	15:31	0:33	38:58	0:36	17:24	1:13:02
14	Oussama Nabil (MAR)	14:44	0:31	41:15	0:37	16:27	1:13:34
15	Krzysztof Hadas (POL)	14:46	0:38	41:08	0:39	16:32	1:13:43
16	Joshua Steytler (RSA)	15:24	0:30	39:09	0:33	18:34	1:14:10
17	James Hodgson (GBR)	15:23	0:31	40:37	0:35	17:53	1:14:59
18	Benjamin Choquert (FRA)	14:44	0:30	43:17	0:47	16:36	1:15:54
19	Wout Driever (NED)	15:51	0:35	41:22	1:05	18:06	1:16:59
20	Mickael Chaumond (CAM)	14:45	0:32	43:43	0:42	17:34	1:17:16
21	Abdessamad Hindi (MAR)	15:31	0:31	42:50	0:39	18:00	1:17:31
22	Joshua Weston (GBR)	15:16	0:33	44:07	0:44	18:08	1:18:48
23	Divan De Vries (RSA)	15:15	0:33	45:34	0:32	17:27	1:19:21
24	Albion Ymeri (KOS)	16:05	0:32	44:45	0:36	18:52	1:20:50
—	Moussa Karich (BRN)	15:15	0:34	—	—	—	DNF
—	Amarsanaa Ganbaatar (MGL)	17:32	0:34	—	—	—	DNF
—	Eldiiar Kadyrov (KGZ)	16:36	0:37	—	—	—	DNF
—	Munkhbayar Narandulam (MGL)	14:43	0:36	—	—	—	DNF
—	Vesal Kit (CAM)	17:32	0:31	—	—	—	DNF
—	David Rodríguez Girón (MEX)	16:36	0:36	—	—	—	DNF
—	Thibaut De Smet (BEL)	—	—	—	—	—	DNS

=== Women ===
Rank	Athlete	Run 1	T1	Bike	T2	RUN 2	Total time
1st place, gold medalist(s)	Lisa Tertsch (GER)	17:11	030	47:07	032	16:43	1:22:03
2nd place, silver medalist(s)	Diana Isakova (RUS)	17:12	032	47:04	031	16:49	1:22:08
3rd place, bronze medalist(s)	Jasmijn Bakker (NED)	17:11	031	47:10	036	16:59	1:22:27
4	Jeanne Dupont (BEL)	17:11	033	47:07	040	17:03	1:22:34
5	María Varo Zubiri (ESP)	17:11	029	47:09	033	17:15	1:22:37
6	Meghan Bazire (FRA)	17:13	032	47:05	033	17:32	1:22:55
7	Emma Wasser (FRA)	17:12	030	47:08	033	17:54	1:23:17
8	Fiona Cornet (FRA)	17:14	032	47:05	036	18:42	1:24:09
9	Ivana Kuriackova (SVK)	17:31	034	47:33	036	19:04	1:25:18
10	Camille Roman (BEL)	18:01	039	46:58	038	19:04	1:25:20
11	Kitty Shepherd-Cross (GBR)	17:17	052	50:10	051	18:48	1:27:58
12	Ghizlane Assou (MAR)	18:26	035	48:55	038	19:53	1:28:27
13	Selene Martinez Avila (MEX)	17:12	033	50:19	053	19:54	1:28:51
14	Islam Bkhibkhi (MAR)	19:13	035	50:59	038	23:07	1:34:32
15	Aya Bkhibkhi (MAR)	19:13	039	50:57	040	23:08	1:34:37

=== Mixed relay ===
The 2x2 mixed relay involves teams of two, one man, and one woman, racing two legs each of a relay over a sprint distance. Nations ere entitled to enter more than one team, demarked by a team number in roman numerals (I, II, etc,).

Rank	Country	Athletes	First leg	Second leg	Third leg	Fourth leg	Overall time
1st place, gold medalist(s)	Russia I	Valentina Riasova; Dmitrii Karpeev	20:01	18:38	20:51	18:59	1:18:31
2nd place, silver medalist(s)	Netherlands I	Jasmijn Bakker; Thomas Cremers	20:02	18:59	21:05	19:21	1:19:30
3rd place, bronze medalist(s)	France II	Emma Wasser; Emile Blondel Hermant	20:14	18:49	21:30	19:20	1:19:55
4	France I	Fiona Cornet; Benjamin Choquert	20:34	19:05	21:30	19:54	1:21:05
5	Belgium II	Camille Roman; Jonathan Wayaffe	21:26	18:37	22:19	18:54	1:21:18
6	Belgium I	Jeanne Dupont; Martin Oldenhove	21:22	18:51	22:07	19:14	1:21:36
7	Morocco I	Ghizlane Assou; Mohamed Nemsi	21:22	18:50	23:20	20:52	1:24:26
DSQ	France III	Meghan Bazire; Adrien Pilleux	20:14	19:38	21:25	19:52	1:21:11

== Age-grade championships ==
In addition to the elite, elite under–23 and elite junior races, a series of amateur age-grade competitions also took place. The winners of each classification is listed below. All races took place over the sprint distance.

=== Sprint ===
Women's races

Classification	Athlete	Total time
16-19 Female	Rachel Wagener (NZL)	1:05:35
20-24 Female	Diana Carolina Cinco Pérez (MEX)	1:07:15
25-29 Female	Phoebe Butt (GBR)	1:10:10
30-34 Female	Charlotte Lee (GBR)	1:05:52
35-39 Female	Abigail Curtis (GBR)	1:06:23
40-44 Female	Erin Hargrave (AUS)	1:09:06
45-49 Female	Zoe Lilly (GBR)	1:10:09
50-54 Female	Celia Dubey (USA)	1:11:01
55-59 Female	Steph Popelar (USA)	1:09:20
60-64 Female	Jayne Baldwin (GBR)	1:15:05
65-69 Female	Elizabeth O'Connor (IRL)	1:23:42
70-74 Female	Janis Milliken (CAN)	1:42:26
75-79 Female	Elspeth Knott (GBR)	1:32:26
80-84 Female	Andrea McCarter (USA)	2:07:37

Open races

Classification	Athlete	Total time
16-19 Open	Henry Ward (NZL)	56:31
20-24 Open	James Vaughan (GBR)	58:54
25-29 Open	Charles Bertier (FRA)	56:47
30-34 Open	Ben Kent (GBR)	59:44
35-39 Open	Benjamin Eurich (GER)	59:35
40-44 Open	John Lenehan (IRL)	58:38
45-49 Open	Arnaud Deceroit (FRA)	58:35
50-54 Open	Robert White (GBR)	1:01:37
55-59 Open	Josep Viladoms Bellart (ESP)	1:02:25
60-64 Open	Carlo Simongini (ITA)	1:03:54
65-69 Open	Tony Harvey (GBR)	1:04:00
70-74 Open	Gerardo Corbato (USA)	1:18:23
75-79 Open	Robert Hodgson (GBR)	1:18:35
80-84 Open	Michael Smallwood (GBR)	1:24:33
85-89 Open	John Wood (NZL)	1:44:06

=== Standard ===
Open

Classification	Athlete	Overall time
18-19 Open	Ashton Guitry (NZL)	2:06:16
20-24 Open	Krzysztof Samorański (POL)	2:00:17
25-29 Open	Charles Bertier (FRA)	1:56:44
30-34 Open	Joseph Wagman (GBR)	1:57:39
35-39 Open	Mykyta Rasnovsky (GBR)	2:04:04
40-44 Open	Sean Burke (GBR)	1:59:15
45-49 Open	Talles Medeiros (BRA)	1:56:47
50-54 Open	Alex Fortune (GBR)	2:00:38
55-59 Open	Pascal Cassez (FRA)	2:07:10
60-64 Open	David Bagge (GBR)	2:08:02
65-69 Open	Jeff Dorrill (USA)	2:24:13
70-74 Open	Christopher Leech (GBR)	2:44:11
75-79 Open	Mogens Busk Sørensen (DEN)	2:37:12
80-84 Open	Vernon Thomas (GBR)	3:31:24
85-89 Open	John Wood (NZL)	3:44:34

Women

Classification	Athlete	Overall time
18-19 Female	Adelle Parkinson-Need (AUS)	2:21:02
20-24 Female	Sedra Hudaifa (UAE)	2:45:04
25-29 Female	Francisca Rivera (CHI)	4:39:32
30-34 Female	Karen Foppa (BRA)	2:14:27
35-39 Female	Marta Motylewska (POL)	2:13:11
40-44 Female	Rachel Wiseman (GBR)	2:03:21
45-49 Female	Sarah Attwood (GBR)	2:16:05
50-54 Female	Natacha Theytaz (SUI)	2:28:48
55-59 Female	Steph Popelar (USA)	2:14:28
60-64 Female	Jayne Baldwin (GBR)	2:34:07
65-69 Female	JoAnn Cranson (USA)	2:47:13
70-74 Female	Nora Haggart (GBR)	2:44:19
75-79 Female	Elspeth Knott (GBR)	3:11:31
80-84 Female	Andrea McCarter (USA)	4:25:50

Overall age-grade titles

by nation

Rank	Nation	Titles
1	Great Britain	24
2	United States	8
3	New Zealand	5
4	France	4
5	Australia	2
5	Brazil	2
5	Ireland	2
5	Poland	2
9	Canada	1
9	Chile	1
9	Denmark	1
9	Spain	1
9	Germany	1
9	Italy	1
9	Mexico	1
9	Switzerland	1
9	United Arab Emirates	1
Total (17 nations)		58

== Para duathlon ==
A series of para duathlon races was also held. As fields wer generally small, full medals were not awarded, but the following table lists the champions of each classification. All but one of the 'first finishers' was Russian.

Classification	Athlete	Overall time
PTWC Men	Emilio Agüera Vozmediano (ESP) (H2)	1:09:21
PTS2 Men	Vasilii Egorov (RUS)	1:12:18
PTS3 Men	Viktor Chebotarev (RUS)	1:08:20
PTS4 Men	Andrey Tolstikov (RUS)	1:04:06
PTS5 Men	Aleksandr Konyshev (RUS)	1:00:28
PTVI Men	Andrey Bukov (RUS) (V2)	1:03:41
PTS3 Women	Anna Plotnikova (RUS)	1:17:02
PTS5 Women	Irina Grazhdanova (RUS)	1:11:17
