= Dmitrii Karpeev =

Russian triathlete and duathlete

Personal information
- Native name: Дмитрий Карпеев
- Nationality: Russian
- Born: 2005 (age 20–21) Krasnodar Krai, Russia

Sport
- Sport: Triathlon, duathlon
- Coached by: Tatyana Tsepayeva
Medal record
Men's duathlon
Representing Russia
World Duathlon Championships
Gold medal – first place	2026 Abu Dhabi	2x2 mixed relay
Bronze medal – third place	2026 Abu Dhabi	individual (under-23)

Dmitrii Karpeev (Russian: Дмитрий Карпеев; born c. 2005) is a Russian triathlete and duathlete. He won the gold medal in the 2x2 mixed relay at the 2026 World Triathlon Duathlon Championships alongside Valentina Riasova.

== Career ==
Karpeev competes out of Krasnodar Krai in southern Russia under coach Tatyana Tsepayeva and holds the national sporting title of Master of Sport of Russia. Competing in junior categories, he earned silver medals at the Russian Junior Championships in both triathlon and duathlon in 2023 before winning the Russian Junior Triathlon Championship title in Ufa in 2024. That same year, he secured bronze medals at the Europe Junior Duathlon Championships and a Europe Triathlon Cup event in Turkey.

In August 2026, Karpeev won his first senior national title at the Russian Triathlon Championships in Moscow over the standard Olympic distance. In October 2026, he claimed a bronze medal in the elite men's sprint triathlon at the Europe Triathlon Cup in Alanya, Turkey.

At the 2026 World Triathlon Duathlon Championships in Abu Dhabi in November 2026, Karpeev finished seventh in the elite men's individual race in a time of 1:10:57, earning the bronze medal in the under-23 category. The following day, he teamed up with Valentina Riasova to win the elite world title in the 2x2 mixed relay, finishing in 1:18:31.

== Major results ==
2021
(bronze) Team relay, International Youth Relay (Serbia)

2023
(gold) National Junior Championships (Mixed relay)
(silver) National Junior Championships (Triathlon)
(silver) National Junior Duathlon Championships

2024
(gold) National Junior Championships (Triathlon)
(bronze) Europe Triathlon Cup (Turkey)
(bronze) Europe Junior Duathlon Championships
(bronze) National Duathlon Championships

2025
(bronze) National Championships (Sprint)

2026
World Triathlon Duathlon Championships

(gold) 2x2 Mixed relay (with Valentina Riasova), elite
(bronze) individual, under-23
7th individual, elite

(gold) National Championships (Olympic distance)
(bronze) Europe Triathlon Cup (Alanya)
