= Djenyfer Arnold =

Brazilian triathlete (born 1993)

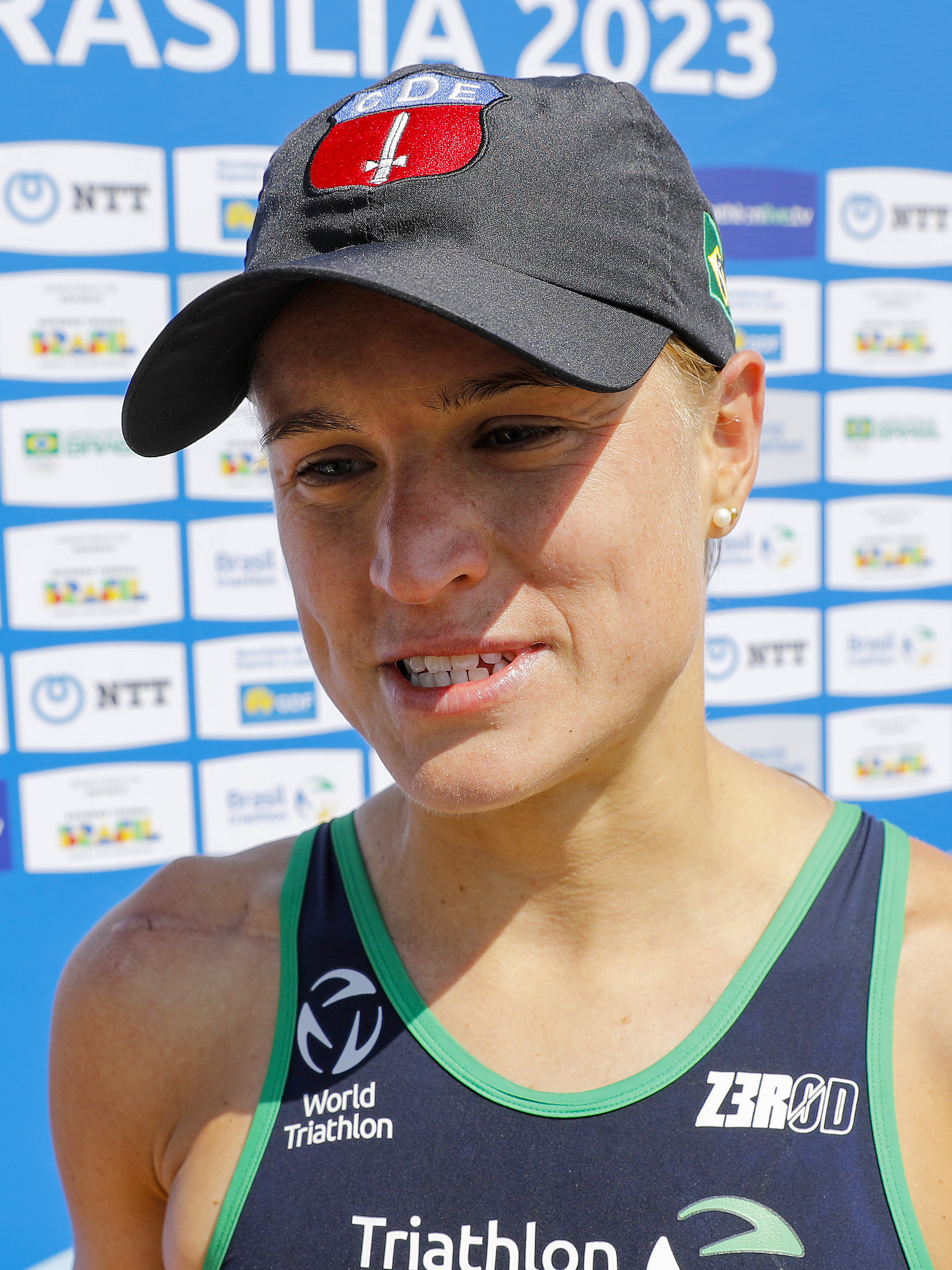
- Arnold pictured in 2023

Personal information
- Born: 8 March 1993 (age 33) São Bento do Sul, Brazil

Sport
- Country: Brazil
- Sport: Triathlon
Medal record
Women's triathlon
Representing Brazil
Pan American Games
Gold medal – first place	2023 Santiago	Mixed relay
Americas Championships
Gold medal – first place	2025 Calima	Individual

Djenyfer Arnold (born 8 March 1993) is a Brazilian triathlete. She won the gold medal in the mixed relay in 2023 Santiago Pan American Games event together with Miguel Hidalgo, Manoel Messias and Vittória Lopes.

She competed in the Mixed relay at the 2024 Summer Olympics in Paris, France, finishing in the 8th place.
