= Davide Menichelli =

Italian triathlete and duathlete

Personal information
- Nationality: Italian
- Born: June 2003 (age 23) Genoa, Italy

Sport
- Sport: Triathlon, duathlon
- Club: Doria Nuoto Loano
- Coached by: Paolo Zunino, Camilla Priarone
Medal record
Men's duathlon
Representing Italy
World Duathlon Championships
Gold medal – first place	2026 Abu Dhabi	Individual, elite
Gold medal – first place	2026 Abu Dhabi	Individual, under-23

Davide Menichelli (born 2003) is an Italian triathlete and duathlete. At the 2026 World Triathlon Duathlon Championships in Abu Dhabi, he won gold medals in both the elite men's individual and under-23 individual events, becoming the first Italian male athlete to win the senior individual world title in duathlon.

== Career ==
Originally from the Pegli district of Genoa, Menichelli developed through the youth ranks of the Italian Triathlon Federation (FITRI), competing for the Ligurian club Doria Nuoto Loano while training in Genoa under coaches Paolo Zunino and Camilla Priarone. Across his early international career on the World Triathlon circuit, he recorded 12 podium finishes from 61 starts, including five victories.

During the 2026 season, Menichelli placed fourth at the Italian Sprint Triathlon National Championships in September before recording top-twelve finishes on the Europe Triathlon Cup circuit in Ceuta and Ibiza .

On 14 November 2026, Menichelli competed at the 2026 World Triathlon Duathlon Championships in Abu Dhabi, contested over a 5.1 km run, 29.5 km cycle, and 5.1 km run. Exiting the first transition at the front of the pack, he launched a solo breakaway on the cycling leg before being joined late on the third lap by Belgium's Martin Oldenhove. The pair built a one-minute advantage over the chasing field entering the second transition, after which Menichelli pulled clear within the first 1.5 km of the final run to win in 1:10:04, ahead of Oldenhove (1:10:39) and France's Adrien Pilleux (1:10:44).

His performance secured both the elite men's and under-23 world titles simultaneously, making him the first Italian man to win the elite World Duathlon Championship.

== Major results ==
2023–2025
12 career World Triathlon podiums across junior, under-23, and elite competition (5 wins)

2026
World Triathlon Duathlon Championships

(gold) Elite individual
(gold) Under-23 individual

2026 (continued)
4th National Sprint Championships
5th Europe Triathlon Cup (Santa Eulària des Riu – Ibiza)
12th Europe Triathlon Cup (Ceuta)
