= Seth Rider =

American triathlete (born 1997)

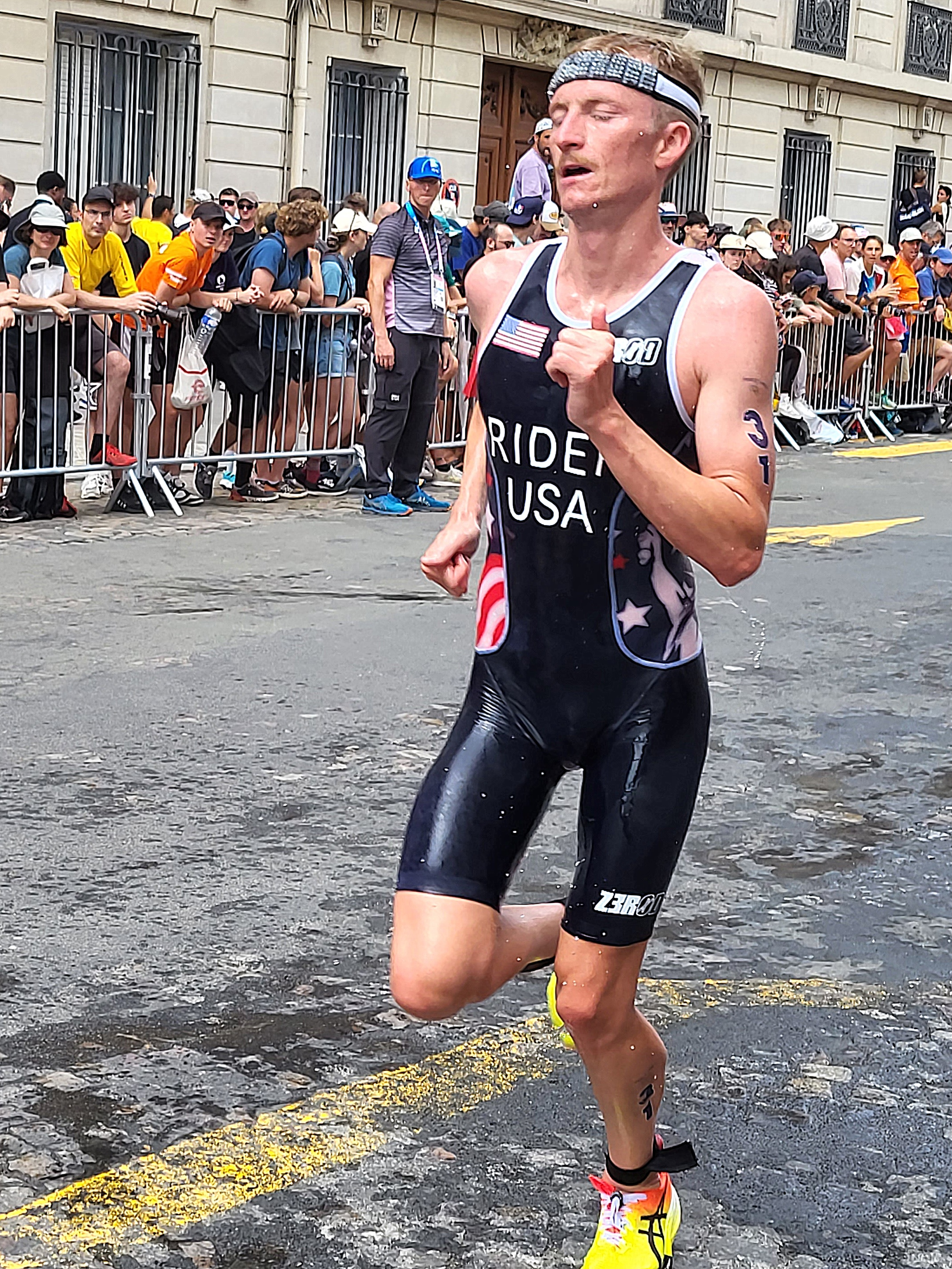
- Rider at the 2024 Summer Olympics

Personal information
- Born: March 6, 1997 (age 29) Germantown, Tennessee, United States
- Education: Queens University of Charlotte
- Height: 6 ft 0 in (183 cm)

Sport
- Country: United States
- Sport: Triathlon
Medal record
Men's triathlon
Representing the United States
Olympic Games
Silver medal – second place	2024 Paris	Mixed relay
Pan American Games
Silver medal – second place	2023 Santiago	Mixed relay

Seth Rider (born March 6, 1997) is an American professional triathlete. He qualified for the men's triathlon at the 2024 Summer Olympics.

== Career ==
In 2021, he was part of the United States team that won gold in the mixed relay at the World Triathlon Championship Series in Montreal. He also won a silver medal in the mixed relay at the 2023 Pan American Games in addition to finishing fifth in the individual race.

In 2024, Rider explained that he was attempting to "increase his E. coli threshold" prior to competing in the men's triathlon at the Paris Olympics in order to better prepare for the high levels detected in the Seine. He claimed that he achieved this by "not washing [his] hands after [going] to the bathroom and stuff like that".
