= Valentina Riasova =

Russian triathlete and duathlete

Personal information
- Native name: Валентина Александровна Рясова
- Nationality: Russian
- Born: Valentina Alexandrovna Riasova; 26 May 1998 (age 28) Taganrog, Rostov Oblast, Russia

Sport
- Sport: Triathlon, duathlon
Medal record
Women's duathlon
Representing Russia
World Duathlon Championships
Gold medal – first place	2026 Abu Dhabi	2x2 Mixed relay
Women's triathlon
Representing Russia
European Championships
Silver medal – second place	2021 Kitzbühel	Sprint
Bronze medal – third place	2021 Kitzbühel	Mixed relay
Representing Neutral Athletes
Bronze medal – third place	2026 Tarragona	Standard
European U23 Championships
Representing Russia
Gold medal – first place	2021 Kitzbühel	Sprint
Bronze medal – third place	2019 Valencia	Standard
Bronze medal – third place	2018 Eilat	Mixed relay

Valentina Alexandrovna Riasova (Russian: Валентина Александровна Рясова; born 26 May 1998) is a Russian triathlete and duathlete. She won the gold medal in the 2x2 mixed relay at the 2026 World Triathlon Duathlon Championships in Abu Dhabi alongside Dmitrii Karpeev.

== Career ==
=== Junior and early senior progression (2015–2021) ===
Born in Taganrog, Riasova began competing in international junior events in 2015, placing fourth at the Russian Junior National Championships before breaking onto the European Junior Cup podium in 2017. That year, she won her first international title at the Tabor ETU Triathlon Junior European Cup in July, followed by a silver medal in Zagreb and a bronze in Melilla.

Stepping up to under-23 and senior competition in 2018, Riasova earned a bronze medal in the mixed relay at the European U23 Championships in Eilat. In 2019, she opened her season with a third-place finish at the Liévin Indoor Triathlon European Cup and went on to claim bronze in the individual women's race at the 2019 Valencia ETU Triathlon U23 European Championships.

After taking silver at the 2020 Russian Triathlon National Championships, Riasova achieved a major breakthrough during the 2021 season. At the 2021 Europe Triathlon Sprint and Relay Championships in Kitzbühel, she won the European under-23 sprint title while simultaneously finishing second in the elite women's sprint race and adding a bronze medal in the elite mixed relay. Two weeks later, she won the senior elite title at the Russian Triathlon National Championships and added a silver medal at the Europe Triathlon Cup in Balıkesir.

=== Doping finding and suspension ===
In an in-competition test in 2021, Riasova's sample was found to be contaminated. Her post-race sample returned an adverse analytical finding for the prohibited substance 5-Methylhexaneamine, which she blamed on inadvertently ingesting the substance from one of her husband's drinks - her husband, a triathlete, had also failed the test at the same tme. Following an appeal to CAS/TAS, Riasova received a two year suspension.

=== Return to competition and World Cup victories (2025–2026) ===
Returning to international racing in May 2025 as an Individual Neutral Athlete (AIN), Riasova immediately captured her first World Triathlon Cup gold medal in Chengdu, winning over the Olympic distance in 1:53:22. She closed the 2025 campaign with back-to-back sprint World Cup victories in Miyazaki in November and at the inaugural World Triathlon Women's Cup in Dubai (a World Triathlon Cup leg dedicated to only the women's events) in December.

In 2026, Riasova earned a World Cup silver medal in Chengdu in May and claimed individual bronze over the standard distance at the 2026 Europe Triathlon Championships in Tarragona in June.

=== 2026 World Duathlon Championships ===
At the 2026 World Triathlon Multisport Championships on Hudayriyat Island in Abu Dhabi in November 2026, Riasova placed fourth in the World Triathlon Championship Series mixed relay on 14 November before contesting the 2026 World Triathlon Duathlon Championships 2x2 mixed relay on 15 November. Partnering with Dmitrii Karpeev and competing under the Russian banner, Riasova contested the first and third legs of the four-leg race (each comprising a 2 km run, 6.1 km cycle, and 1 km run), clocking individual leg splits of 20:51 and 20:01. Breaking clear midway through the opening leg, Riasova and Karpeev won the world title in 1:18:31, finishing 59 seconds ahead of silver medallists Jasmijn Bakker and Thomas Cremers of the Netherlands.

== Major results ==
2017
ETU Triathlon Junior European Cup

(gold) ETU Triathlon Junior European Cup (Tábor)
(silver) ETU Triathlon Junior European Cup (Zagreb)
(bronze) ETU Triathlon Junior European Cup (Melilla)

2018
(bronze) ETU Triathlon U23 European Championships (Mixed relay)

2019
(bronze) ETU Triathlon U23 European Championships (Standard)
(bronze) ETU Indoor Triathlon European Cup (Liévin)

2020
National Championships

(silver) individual (Standard)

2021
Europe Triathlon Sprint and Relay Championships

(gold) Under-23 sprint
(silver) Elite sprint
(bronze) Elite mixed relay

Europe Triathlon Cup

(silver) ETC Balıkesir

National Championships

(gold) National Championships, standard

2025
World Triathlon Cup

(gold) WTC Chengdu (standard)
(gold) WTC Miyazaki (sprint)
(gold) WTC, Dubai Women's Cup
5th, WTC, Tongyeong

2026
World Triathlon Duathlon Championships

(gold) 2x2 Mixed relay (with Dmitrii Karpeev)

World Triathlon Championship Series

4th, WTCS Abu Dhabi, Mixed relay
6th, WTCS Quiberon

World Triathlon Cup

(silver) WTC Chengdu
4th, WTC Hong Kong
4th, WTC Rome, mixed relay)

Europe Triathlon Championships

(bronze) individual standard
