= Brandon Copeland =

Brandon Copeland may refer to:

- Brandon Copeland (linebacker) (born 1991), American football player
- Brandon Copeland (wide receiver) (born 1986), American football player
