= Chase McQueen =

American triathlete

Personal information
- Nationality: American
- Born: 1998
- Education: University of Arizona; Arizona State University

Sport
- Country: United States
- Sport: Triathlon
Medal record
Men's Triathlon
Representing United States
E World Triathlon Championships
Gold medal – first place	E World Triathlon Championships	London 2024
Silver medal – second place	E World Triathlon Championships	London 2025

Chase McQueen (born 1998) is an American triathlete. He won the E World Triathlon Championships in 2024.

== Early life ==
He attended Columbus North High School in Columbus, Indiana and finished runner-up in the junior elite men's division of the 2016 USA Triathlon national championships in West Chester, Ohio. He then attended the University of Arizona, later transferring Arizona State University.

== Career ==
In 2021, he made his debut in the World Triathlon Championship Series, racing at the World Series Championship event in Leeds. During the race, Alistair Brownlee was disqualified for appearing to "dunk" McQueen during the swim stage. That year, he was part of the United States team that won gold in the mixed relay at the World Triathlon Championship Series Montreal.

In July 2022, he secured a 12th-place finish at the 2022 World Triathlon Cup Pontevedra.

He won the Arena Games Triathlon held on Feb 25, 2023 at the Parc Olympique in Montreal. At the Super League's Arena Games Final in London in 2023, McQueen responded to what he perceived to be faulty equipment by swimming butterfly. He finished 14th at the 2023 Pan American Games in Santiago. He finished runner-up at the 2023 Americas Triathlon Sprint Championships in Santa Marta, Colombia in September 2023.

He won the E World Triathlon Championships in London in April 2024. He was runner-up to Frenchman Maxime Hueber-Moosbrugger at the E World Triathlon Championships in London in April 2025.

== Personal life ==
He is based in Girona, Spain. He is coached by Joel Filliol, in a group with triathletes including Vincent Luis, Vasco Vilaça, and Jelle Geens.
