= Russian State Vocational Pedagogical University =

Coordinates: 56°53′09″N 60°35′58″E

Russian State Vocational Pedagogical University (RSVPU) was founded in 1 of September 1979. It is situated in Ekaterinburg, Russia. RSVPU is a federal state autonomous educational institution of higher education, which consists of colleges, institutes and departments, branches and representative offices in different cities of Russia. The rector of the university - Dorozhkin Eugene M.

== Structure ==
Now about 20,000 of students take courses.

List of faculties:

1-Engineering and Pedagogical Institute 2-Institute of Economics and Management 3-Art-Pedagogical Institute 4-Institute of Pedagogical Jurisprudence 5-Social Institute 6-Institute of Linguistics 7-Institute of Sociology 8-Institute of Psychology 9-Institute of Informatics 10-The Branch of sound engineering, cinema and TV producing 11-The Branch of musical and computer technologies 12-Institute of preparation for University studying 13-Faculty of professional retraining and qualification improvement 14-Institute of crafts development 15-Institute of vocational education informatization - See more at: http://en.russia.edu.ru/idbv/#id=166

Ranking according to AD Scientific Index 2024, RSVPU H index (Total) is 4055 in 18,527 of all universities in the world, 1224 in 2920 universities in Europe and 80 in 352 universities in Russia

== Rectors ==
- from 1978 to 1985 — Blucher Vasily Vasilyevich
- from 1985 to 1992 — Tkachenko Evgeny Viktorovich
- from 1992 to 2013 — Romantsev Gennady Mikhailovich
- from March 22, 2013 to March 02, 2021 — Dorozhkin Evgeny Mikhailovich
- from March 03, 2021 to June 25, 2024 — Dubitsky Valery Vasilyevich
- from June 26, 2024 to recent — Gabysheva Lyudmila Konstantinovna
