= Emy Legault =

Canadian triathlete (born 1996)

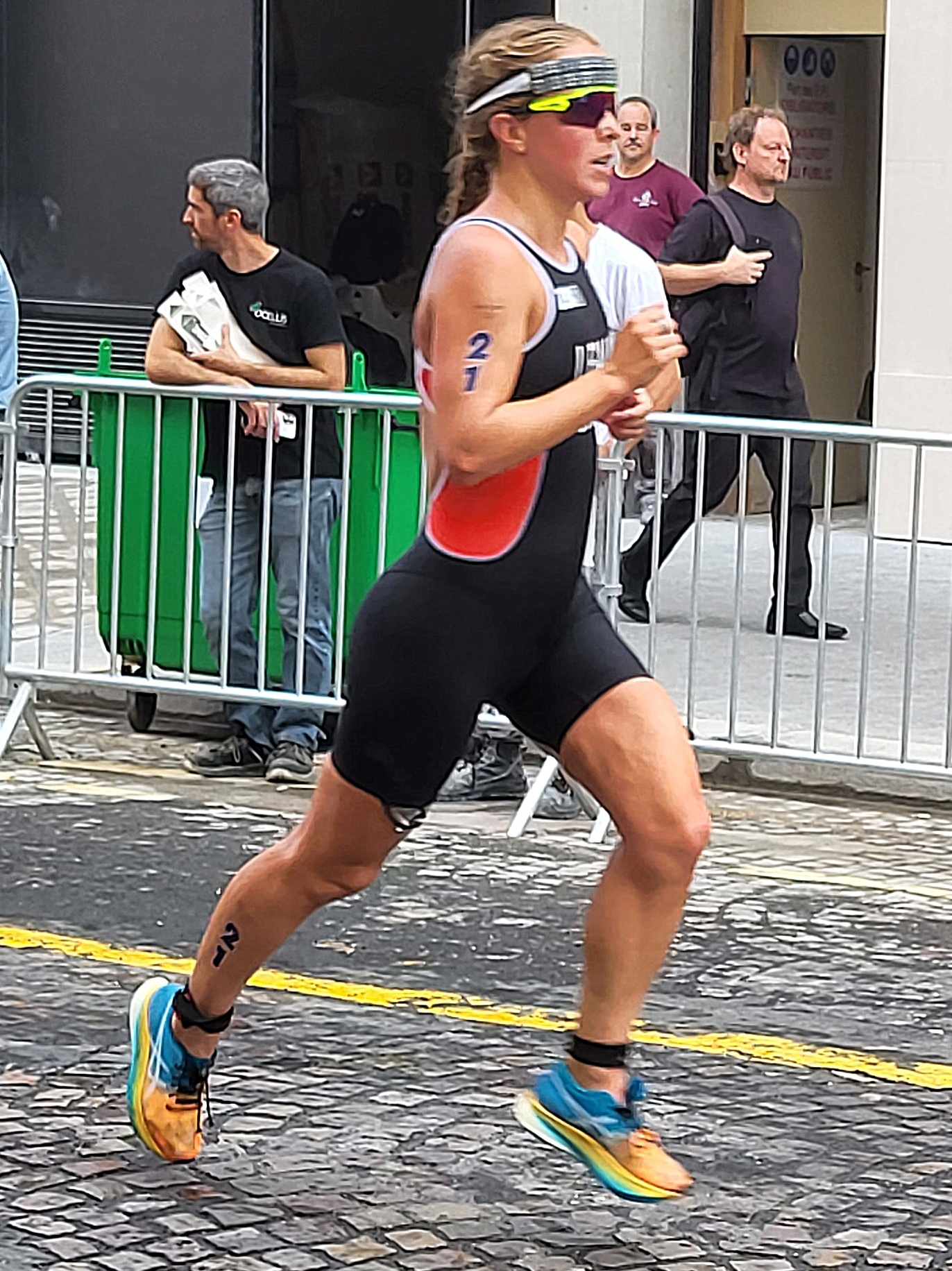

Personal information
- Born: 5 April 1996 (age 30) L'Île-Perrot, Quebec, Canada

Sport
- Sport: Triathlon
Medal record
Women's triathlon
Representing Canada
Pan American Games
| Bronze medal – third place | 2023 Santiago | Mixed relay |
Americas Championships
| Silver medal – second place | 2025 Calima | Mixed relay |
| Bronze medal – third place | 2025 Calima | Individual |

Emy Legault (born April 5, 1996) is a Canadian triathlete from L'Île-Perrot, Quebec.

== Career ==
Legault made her debut 2015 World Triathlon Cup in Montérégie, finishing in 55th.

As part of the 2022 World Triathlon Cup, Legault won a silver medal in the stop in Huatulco, Mexico. In July 2022, Legault posted a tenth place finish in the World Triathlon Championship Series stop in Hamburg, Germany, a career best finish in a World Triathlon Championship Series event.

On June 30, 2022 Legault was named to Canada's 2022 Commonwealth Games team. She came 10th in the women's event.

In July 2024, Legault represented Canada at the Paris Olympics, finishing 35th in the women's triathlon with a time of 2:01:54.
