= Maxime Hueber-Moosbrugger =

French triathlete (born 1996)

Personal information
- Born: 29 April 1996 (age 30)

Sport
- Sport: Triathlon, Duathlon
Medal record
Men's Triathlon
Representing France
E World Triathlon Championships
Gold medal – first place	E World Triathlon Championships	London 2025
Bronze medal – third place	E World Triathlon Championships	London 2024
Men's duathlon
World Games
Gold medal – first place	2022 Birmingham	Individual
Gold medal – first place	2022 Birmingham	Mixed relay

Maxime Hueber-Moosbrugger (born 29 April 1996) is a French duathlete and triathlete. He won the gold medals in the men's individual duathlon and the mixed team relay events at the 2022 World Games held in Birmingham, United States. He won the E World Triathlon Championships in 2025 in London.

== Early life ==
A junior cross country running athlete for France, he was educated at the Henri Meck School in Molsheim before studying Electrical Engineering and Industrial Computing at the University of Upper Alsace in Mulhouse.

== Career ==
=== Duathlon ===
In November 2021, he was the silver medalist at the World Championships Duathlon. In July 2022, he won the duathlon race at the 2022 World Games in Birmingham, Alabama. He also won the gold medal in the mixed relay the following day, alongside Marion Legrand.

=== Triathlon ===
He placed third at the E World Triathlon Championships in London in April 2024 In August 2024, he won the Europe Triathlon Cup Istanbul in Turkey. In November 2024, he won the sprint distance triathlon at the Miyazaki World Cup event in Japan.

He won the E World Triathlon Championships in London in April 2025, winning a sprint finish ahead of the defending champion Chase McQueen of the United States. The following month, he won the World Triathlon Cup event in Samarkand.
