= Oliver Conway =

British triathlete (born 2005)

Personal information
- Nationality: British
- Born: 16 June 2005 (age 21)

Sport
- Sport: Athletics
- Events: Triathlon, Cross country running
Medal record
Representing Great Britain
Men's triathlon
World Triathlon Championship Series
Gold medal – first place	2025 Wollongong	U23
Gold medal – first place	2025 Wollongong	U23/Junior relay
World Triathlon Mixed Relay Championships
Bronze medal – third place	2026 Hamburg	Elite team
European Triathlon Championships
Gold medal – first place	2026 Tarragona	Elite

Oliver Conway (born 16 June 2005) is a British cross country runner and triathlete. He won the men's elite race at the 2026 European Triathlon Championships in his debut season as a senior triathlete. Prior to turning senior, he won the Under-23 world title at the 2025 World Triathlon Championship Series Grand Final.

== Career ==
A member of Radley Athletics Club, he competed for Great Britain in the U20 category at the 2024 European Cross Country Championships in Antalya, Turkey, in December 2024. In May 2025, he won the British Universities and Colleges Sport (BUCS) title in the triathlon, having placed second overall the previous year.

In June 2025, he joined the Brownlee Racing team. Shortly afterwards, he won his first World Triathlon Cup victory in Saïdia, Morocco finishing ahead of Canadian Tyler Mislawchuk and American John Reed. In September 2025, he placed fourth overall on his World Triathlon Championship Series debut in Karlovy Vary. That month, he placed third at Supertri Jersey.

He won the 2025 World Triathlon U23 Championship in Wollongong, Australia, in October 2025, at the age of 20 years-old.

Conway started the 2026 season by winning the World Triathlon Cup Haikou, in China, in March 2026.

== Personal life ==
He studies at the University of Nottingham.
