= Triathlon at the 2023 Pan American Games =

- Triathlon pictogram
- Venue: El Sol Beach
- Start date: November 2, 2023
- End date: November 4, 2023
- No. of events: 3 (1 men, 1 women, 1 mixed)
- Competitors: 72 from 19 nations

Triathlon competitions at the 2023 Pan American Games in Santiago, Chile were held between November 2 and 4, 2023 at El Sol Beach in Viña del Mar.

Three medal events were contested, one individual event per gender and one mixed relay. A total of 72 triathletes competed in the Games.

== Qualification ==
A total of 72 triathletes (36 per gender) will qualify to compete. A nation may enter a maximum of 6 triathletes (three per gender), with the exception of the winners of the 2021 Junior Pan American Games. The host nation (Chile) automatically qualified four athletes (two per gender). All other nations will qualify through various qualifying tournaments and rankings. A maximum five nations could enter the maximum of 3 triathletes per gender.

== Medal summary ==
=== Medal table ===
* Host nation (Chile)

Rank	NOC's	Gold	Silver	Bronze	Total
1	Brazil	2	0	0	2
2	Mexico	1	0	2	3
3	United States	0	2	0	2
4	Colombia	0	1	0	1
5	Canada	0	0	1	1
Totals (5 entries)		3	3	3	9

=== Medalists ===
Event	Gold		Silver		Bronze	
Men's	Miguel Hidalgo; Brazil	1:46:08	Matthew McElroy; United States	1:46:09	Crisanto Grajales; Mexico	1:46:11
Women's	Lizeth Rueda; Mexico	1:57:07	Carolina Velásquez; Colombia	1:57:28	Rosa Tapia; Mexico	1:57:52
Mixed relay	Brazil; Miguel Hidalgo; Djenyfer Arnold; Manoel Messias; Vittória Lopes	1:15:08	United States; Seth Rider; Erika Ackerlund; Matthew McElroy; Virginia Sereno	1:15:26	Canada; Brock Hoel; Emy Legault; Liam Donnelly; Dominika Jamnicky	1:15:36

== See also ==
- Triathlon at the 2024 Summer Olympics
