= Miguel Hidalgo (triathlete) =

Brazilian triathlete (born 2000)

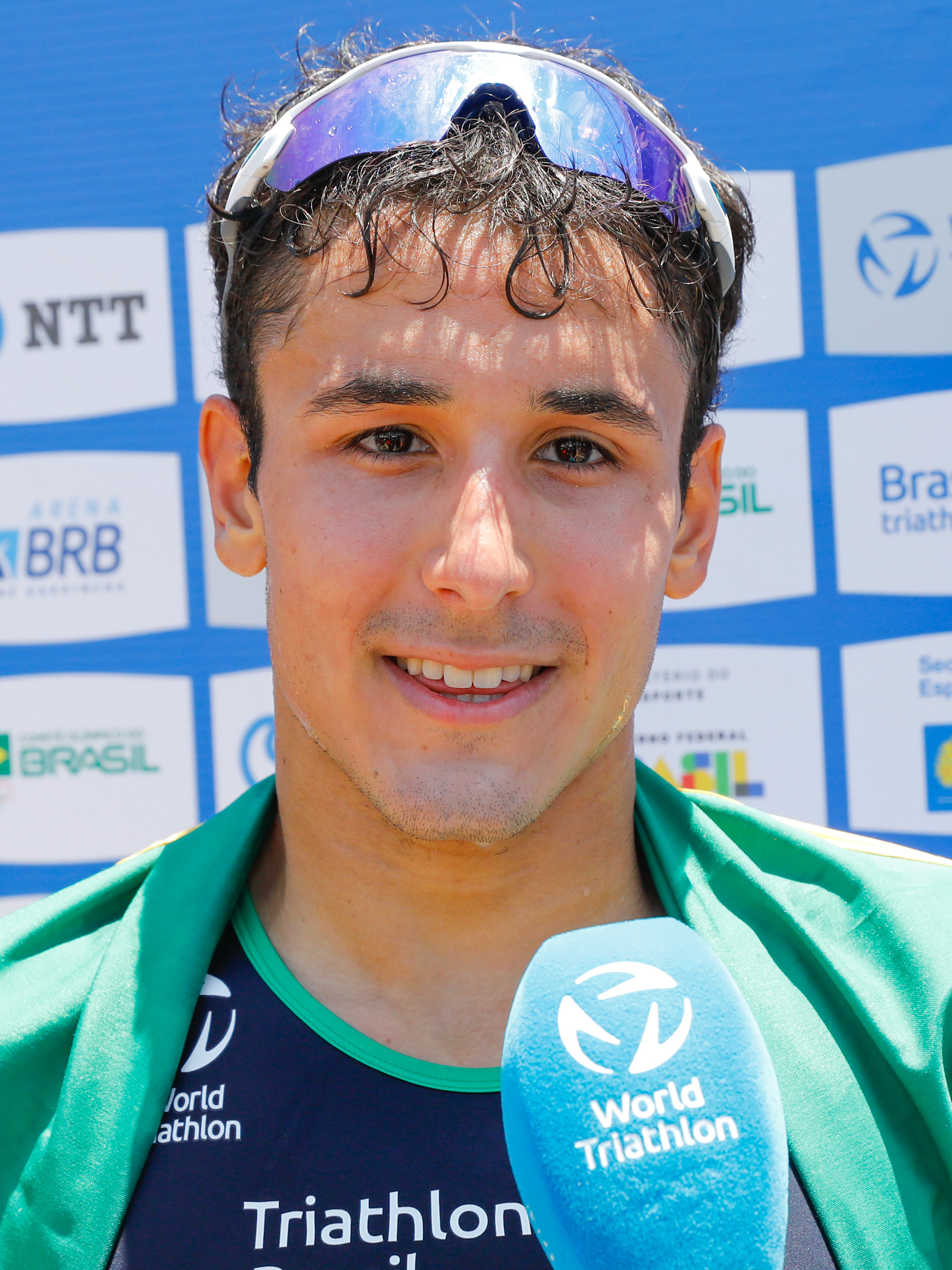

Personal information
- Full name: Miguel Lopes Hidalgo
- Born: 8 April 2000 (age 26) Salto, São Paulo, Brazil
- Height: 176 cm (5 ft 9 in)
- Weight: 62 kg (137 lb)

Sport
- Country: Brazil
- Sport: Triathlon
Medal record
Men's triathlon
Representing Brazil
World Championships
Silver medal – second place	2025 Wollongong	Men's individual
Pan American Games
Gold medal – first place	2023 Santiago	Men
Gold medal – first place	2023 Santiago	Mixed relay
Pan American Championship
Gold medal – first place	2022 Montevideo	Mixed Relay
South American Games
Gold medal – first place	2022 Asunción	Men
Gold medal – first place	2022 Asunción	Mixed relay
Junior Pan American Games
Gold medal – first place	2021 Colombia	Men

Miguel Lopes Hidalgo (born 8 April 2000) is a Brazilian triathlete.

== Career ==
He started practicing triathlon in 2015. Before taking up the sport, he thought about following in his father's footsteps and studying engineering, but opted for the sport.

In 2018 he was Brazilian Junior Champion and South American Junior Champion. In 2019 he was runner-up in the American Cup Brasília, runner-up in the European Cup Holten Junior Champion and South American Junior Champion.

At the 2021 Junior Pan American Games, he won a gold medal in the men's triathlon.

At the 2022 South American Games he won two gold medals, in the men's triathlon and in the triathlon mixed relay.

At the 2022 Pan American Triathlon Championship, held in Montevideo, Uruguay, the Brazilian mixed relay team, with the participation of Hidalgo, won the gold medal.

At the Paris 2024 Olympics test event held in August 2023, Hidalgo finished in 8th place.

In the 2023 World Triathlon Championship Series Finals, held in September, in Pontevedra, Hidalgo finished in 6th position.

At the 2023 Pan American Games he won two gold medals, in the men's triathlon and in the triathlon mixed relay.

At the age of 24, he competed in his first Olympics at the 2024 Olympic Games in Paris. Competing in the individual triathlon event, he was in contention for bronze near the end of the race, with 2 km left to run. After this moment, Hidalgo was unable to maintain the strong pace of the race and was overtaken by some athletes. He finished in 10th place, the best placement ever obtained by a South American in the history of the Olympic triathlon.

In May 2025, Hidalgo made history by becoming the first Brazilian ever to win a World Triathlon Championship Series stage in Italy. He also placed 3rd in the French Riviera stage in August and placed 2nd in the Karlovy Vary stage in the Czech Republic in September, his fourth podium finish of the season. With this result, he reached second place in the World rankings with 2,780.63 points, behind only Australian Matthew Hauser, who had 3,000 points. Over the course of the year, he also placed 3rd in Japan, 4th in Hamburg and 4th in Australia. In the final stage, Hidalgo secured his runner-up position in the world championship, becoming the first Brazilian to win a medal in the Triathlon World Championships.
