= Diego Moya =

Chilean triathlete (born 1998)

Personal information
- Born: 19 October 1998 (age 27) Santiago, Chile

Sport
- Sport: Triathlon
Medal record
Men's triathlon
Representing Chile
Americas Championships
Gold medal – first place	2025 Calima	Individual
South American Games
Bronze medal – third place	2022 Asunción	Individual

Diego Moya (born 19 October 1998) is a Chilean triathlete. He competed in the men's event at the 2020 Summer Olympics held in Tokyo, Japan.

He finished in 14th place in the men's triathlon at the 2019 Pan American Games held in Lima, Peru. He also competed in the mixed relay event.
