= Jolien Vermeylen =

Belgian triathlete (born 1994)

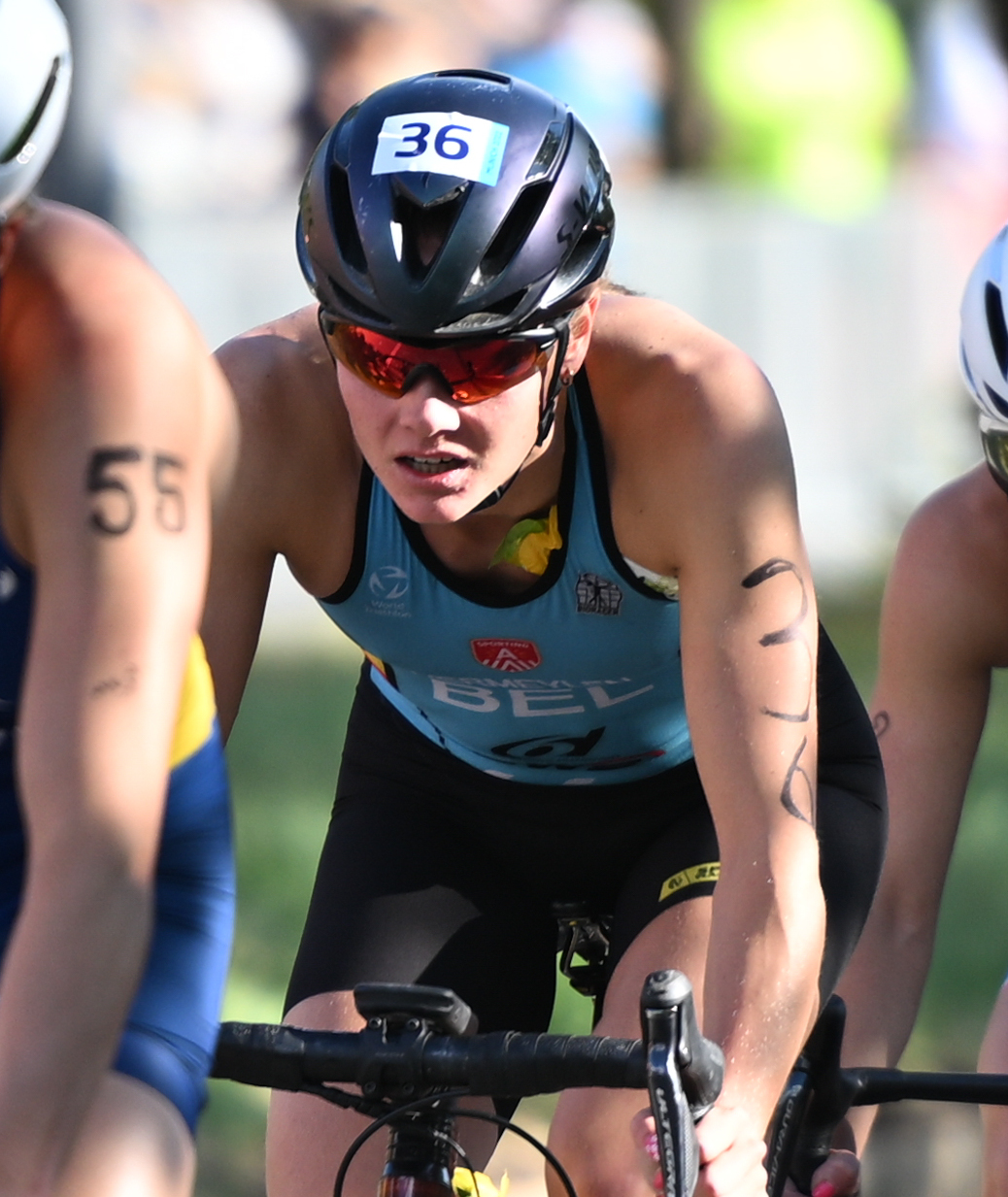
- Vermeylen in 2022

Personal information
- Born: 2 May 1994 (age 32) Leuven, Belgium

Sport
- Country: Belgium
- Sport: Triathlon
Medal record
Women's triathlon
Representing Belgium
European Games
Bronze medal – third place	2023 Kraków-Małopolska	Individual
European Championships
Gold medal – first place	2025 Istanbul	Individual
Silver medal – second place	2026 Tarragona	Individual

Jolien Vermeylen (born 2 May 1994) is a Belgian triathlete.

In June 2023, she finished third in the women's event at the European Games in Poland. In 2024, she finished 24th in the women's triathlon at the Summer Olympics in Paris.

Shortly after the 2024 Summer Olympics, Vermeylen won her first gold medal on the world stage at the World Triathlon Cup Tongyeon. Vermeylen followed this up with more wins in 2025, first at the Europe Triathlon Cup Holten, and then at the Supertri Toronto. Vermeylen capped off 2025 with European championship wins in both the Sprint and Standard Olympic disciplines.

In May 2026 she became victorious in the 4th season of the Flemish TV show The Container Cup. She was the best female contestant after 7 disciplines (running, monkey bars, indoor rowing, golf, shooting, bench press and cycling) and was the final winner of the season.
