= Alberto González (triathlete) =

Spanish triathlete

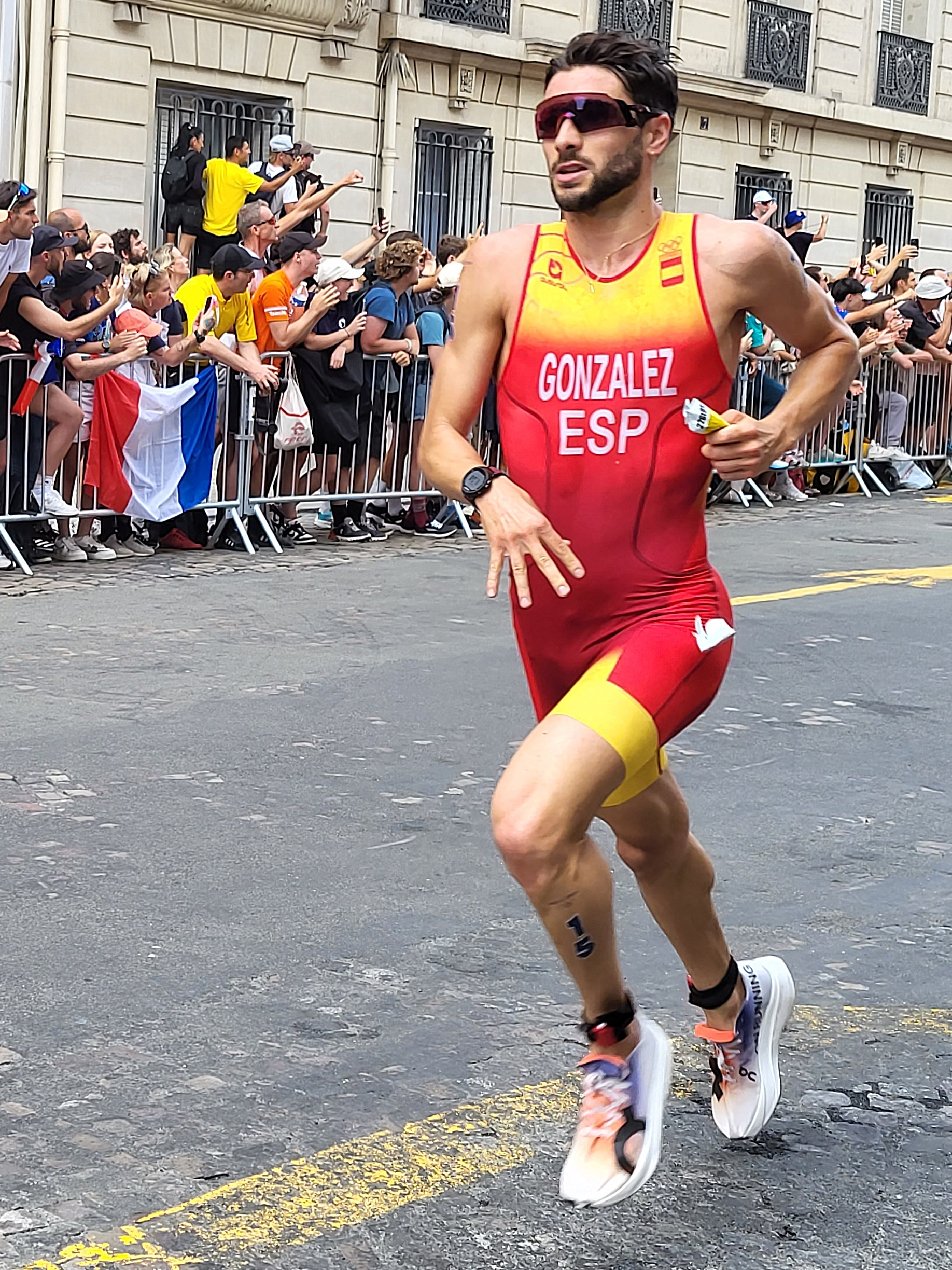
- González in 2024

Personal information
- Full name: Alberto González García
- Born: 15 June 1998 (age 28) Málaga, Spain

Sport
- Country: Spain
- Sport: Triathlon

Alberto González García (Note: In this Spanish name, the first or paternal surname is González and the second or maternal family name is García.) (born 15 June 1998) is a Spanish triathlete.

In March 2024, he won the World Triathlon Cup Hong Kong. He also finished eighth in the men's triathlon at the 2024 Summer Olympics.
