= Ilaria Zane =

Italian triathlete

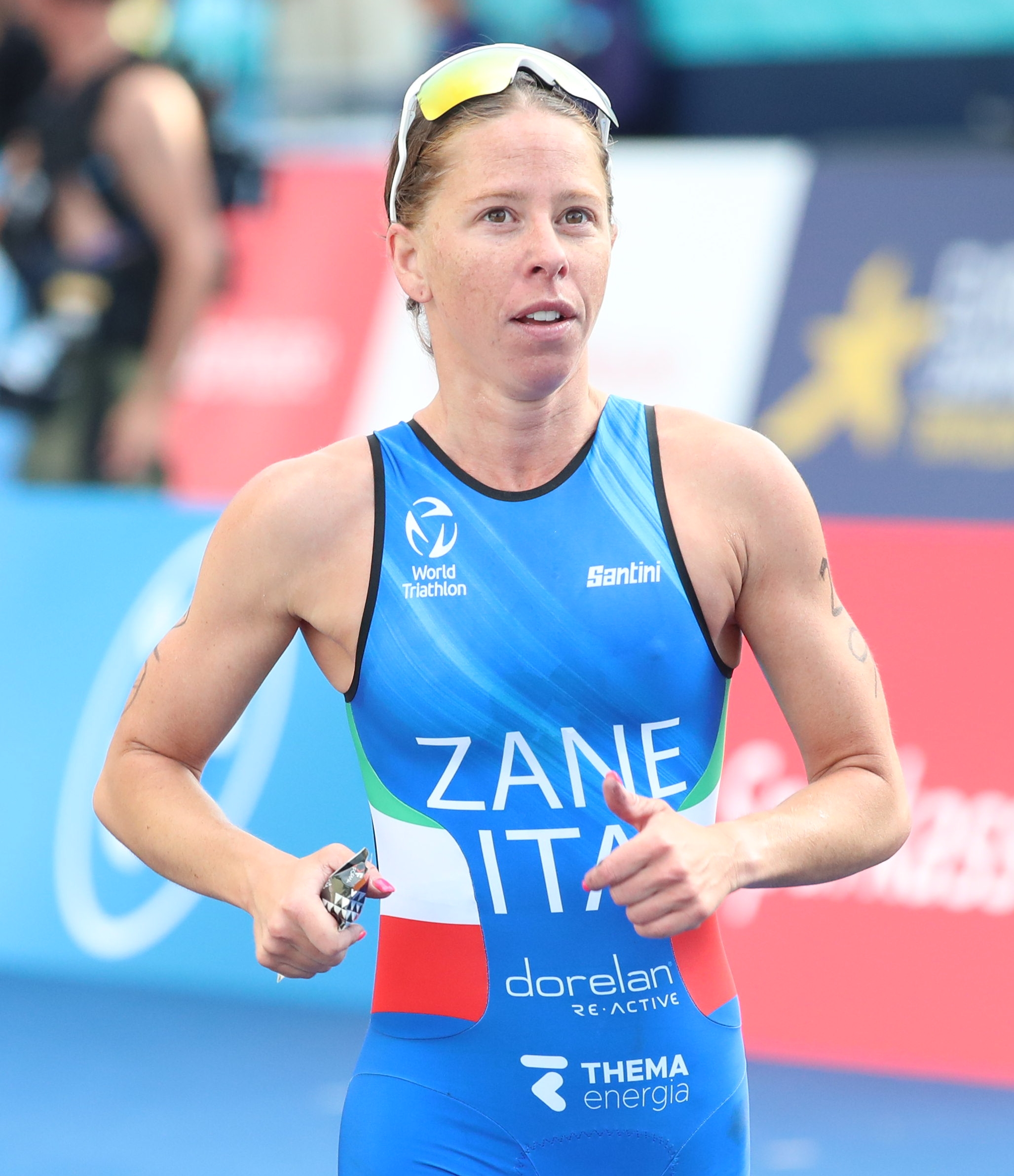

Personal information
- National team: Italy
- Born: 10 February 1992 (age 34) Mestre, Italy
- Height: 1.57 m (5 ft 2 in)

Sport
- Sport: Triathlon
- Club: DDS; Overcome Triathlon (2021-)
Medal record
Triathlon European U23 Championships
Silver medal – second place	2015 Banyoles	Individual

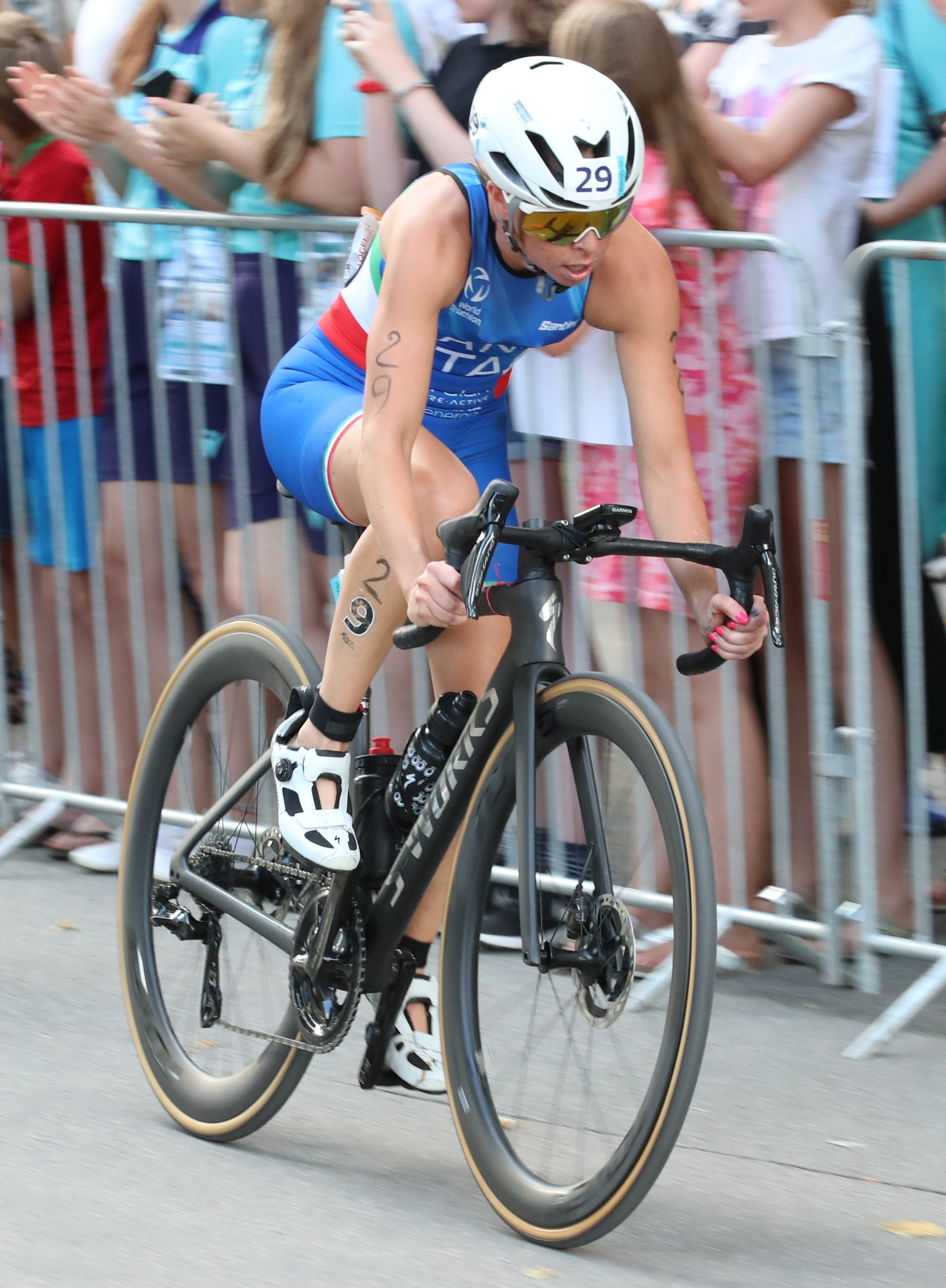
Zane in bike during 2022 European Triathlon Championships.

Ilaria Zane (born 10 February 1992) is an Italian professional triathlete.

== Achievements ==
Year	Competition	Venue	Rank	Race	Time	Notes
2015	European U23 Championships	(Spain) Banyoles	2nd	Olympic	02:00:03	
2019	African Championships	(Tunisia) Hammamet	2nd	Olympic	02:01:04	
2022	European Championships	(Germany) Munich	DNF	Olympic	-	

== National titles ==
Zane won two national championships at individual senior level.

- Italian Triathlon Championships
  - Olympic: 2019
  - Sprint: 2022
