= Diana Isakova =

Russian activist (born 1997)

- Born: c. 30 September 1996
- Occupation: Activist
- Father: Eduard Isakov

Diana Isakova (Russian: Диана Исакова) is a Russian activist opposed to the Putin government and to the 2022 full-scale Russian invasion of Ukraine. She was detained for a QR code protest in Sochi in April 2022 and later released without being prosecuted. Isakova left Russia on 19 August 2022, giving media interviews, describing disagreements with her father, senator of the Russian Federation Eduard Isakov, on LGBT rights in Russia and on the Russian invasion of Ukraine. Isakova described her plans for organising a "new opposition" against authoritarianism in Russia.

== Childhood and education ==
Diana Isakova was born in 1996 or 1997 (age 29–30). Isakova's father is Eduard Isakov, who later became a senator of the Russian Federation. Isakova's parents divorced and Isakova lived separately from her father since the age of three. Isakova had occasional contact with her father during the following years of her childhood, during which Isakov paid alimony.

As a teenager, Isakova describes herself as valuing critical thinking and being interested in psychology and spirituality. She says that her father opposed and denigrated these interests and described him as "cold and inaccessible" and "more interested in his own needs".

During her final two years of high school, from which she graduated, Isakova lived with her father in Khanty-Mansiysk. At the age of 17, she started hitchhiking around the world.

== Early political interests ==
In 2019, Isakova learnt about the second wave of anti-gay purges in Chechnya. She published a comment about the event on an online social network. Her father asked her to delete the comment in order to protect his political career. Isakova removed the post, but sought information about Russian political events, including opposition to the Putin government, while keeping quiet to avoid conflict with her father.

== Teaching ==
Isakova teaches yoga, meditation and singing.

== 2022 Russian invasion of Ukraine ==
Following the 24 February 2022 full-scale Russian invasion of Ukraine, Isakova and some other anti-war protestors in Sochi who had avoided arrest in a protest in March in Sochi chose to print flyers with QR codes that led to an online text "Time to change!" written by Isakova, criticising Vladimir Putin as a dictator and calling for citizens to organise and carry out nonviolent resistance against the Putin government.

On 17 April 2022, Isakova and her colleagues distributed the flyers. Isakova was detained and interrogated for six hours. She was interrogated again the following day. Following her arrest, Isakova spoke with her father, who described her as a "traitor to [their] family, an enemy of the people, and a criminal". Isakova was not prosecuted. Her father visited her "to tell [her] that [she] was no longer his daughter," according to Isakova. Isakova left Russia on 19 August 2022.

Isakova was interviewed by BBC News. She described disagreements with her father on LGBT rights in Russia and the 2022 Russian full-scale invasion of Ukraine that led her to feel "a very big explosion of empathy". On 19 August, Eduard Isakov again described Isakova as a "traitor" and stated that he had cut off communication with her.

== Activist project ==
As of August 2022, Isakova saw the analogy between authoritarianism in the family and the general existence of authoritarianism in Russia as a key to an activist project. She described both her father and Putin as having become authoritarian in response to cruelty suffered during their childhoods. She named her project the "Power of Love Project", aimed to include psychologists, well-known activists and public figures, after having spoken to opposition groups in Sochi and in Moscow over several months. She viewed her project as complementary to existing activities of the Russian opposition and described it as forming a "new opposition" against the invasion.

Isakova stated that she was "convinced that the [Putin] dictatorship [would] fall sooner or later." She expressed concern about what would happen to her father in the event of Putin losing power.

== Personal life ==
According to Isakova's Instagram account and her BBC interview, she is bisexual.
