= Tyler Mislawchuk =

Canadian triathlete

Personal information
- Born: August 19, 1994 (age 32) Winnipeg, Manitoba, Canada
- Height: 188 cm (6 ft 2 in)
- Weight: 59 kg (130 lb)
Medal record
Men's Triathlon
Representing Canada

Tyler Mislawchuk (born August 19, 1994) is a Canadian triathlete from Oak Bluff, Manitoba. He is a three-time Olympian.

== Career ==
In 2015, Mislawchuk raced in the 2015 Pan American Games in Toronto, finishing in 10th place with a time of 1:49:54. In 2016, he was named to the Canadian Olympic team for the 2016 Summer Olympics in Rio de Janeiro. He finished the Olympic race in 15th place with a time of 1:47:50.

In November 2017, Mislawchuk was named to represent Canada at the 2018 Commonwealth Games in Gold Coast, Australia.

In 2019, Mislawchuk won the 2020 Summer Olympics test event. In June 2021, Mislawchuk won the last race before the Olympics as part of the ITU World Cup stop in Mexico. In July, Mislawchuk was officially named to Canada's 2020 Summer Olympics team for Tokyo 2020, where he again came in 15th place. Mislawchuk was scheduled to also compete in the mixed relay triathlon event for Canada, but withdrew after being injured in the individual race and was replaced by Alexis Lepage.

Mislawchuk qualified for his third Olympics at the 2024 Summer Olympics in Paris. He finished in 9th place overall, less than one minute behind gold-medal winner Alex Yee.
