= Agathe Alexandrine Gavaudan =

French operatic singer

Agathe Alexandrine Gavaudan, called Mme Raimbaux or Raimbaux-Gavaudan, (1801 – 19 April 1877) was a French operatic contralto.

== Life ==
Born in Paris, Gavaudan is the daughter of Jean-Baptiste-Sauveur Gavaudan and Alexandrine Marie Agathe Gavaudan-Ducamel.

In 1820, she married Antoine François Victor Raimbaux (†1843) and they had two children. She was a student of Manuel García. She was first appreciated in the salons and in the concerts with, among others, Maria Malibran. In 1830, she performed in England and in 1831, in London In March 1831, she made her debut at the Théâtre italien de Paris in the role of Isabella in L'italiana in Algeri, which can only be sung by a true contralto. then Rosine in The Barber of Seville and in the La Cenerentola. She plays the role of Arsace, a little low for her, in Semiramide in La Prova d'un opéra séria

She played in Naples in 1833 where she obtained success. An illness forced her to return to Paris in 1834 where she gave singing lessons and sang in concerts. François-Joseph Fétis ensures her collaboration for the historical concerts he gives in Paris. She was hired at the Théâtre-Italien for the end of the 1835 season.

At the Théâtre-Italien, on 23 January 1836, a benefit performance is given. Shortly afterwards, Mrs. Raimbaux left the Italian scene.

Raimbaux-Gavaudan, now a widow, married the poet Étienne Casimir Hippolyte Cordellier-Delanoue.

Gavaudan died in the 2nd arrondissement of Paris at the age of 68.

== Roles ==
- 1831 : L'italiana in Algeri, Isabella.
- 1832 : La Cenerentola, eponymous role.
- 1832 : Tancredi, eponymous role.
- 1832, 1835 : La Prova d'un opéra séria, Corilla
