= Joseph (opera) =

1807 opera by Étienne Méhul

- Opera by Étienne Méhul
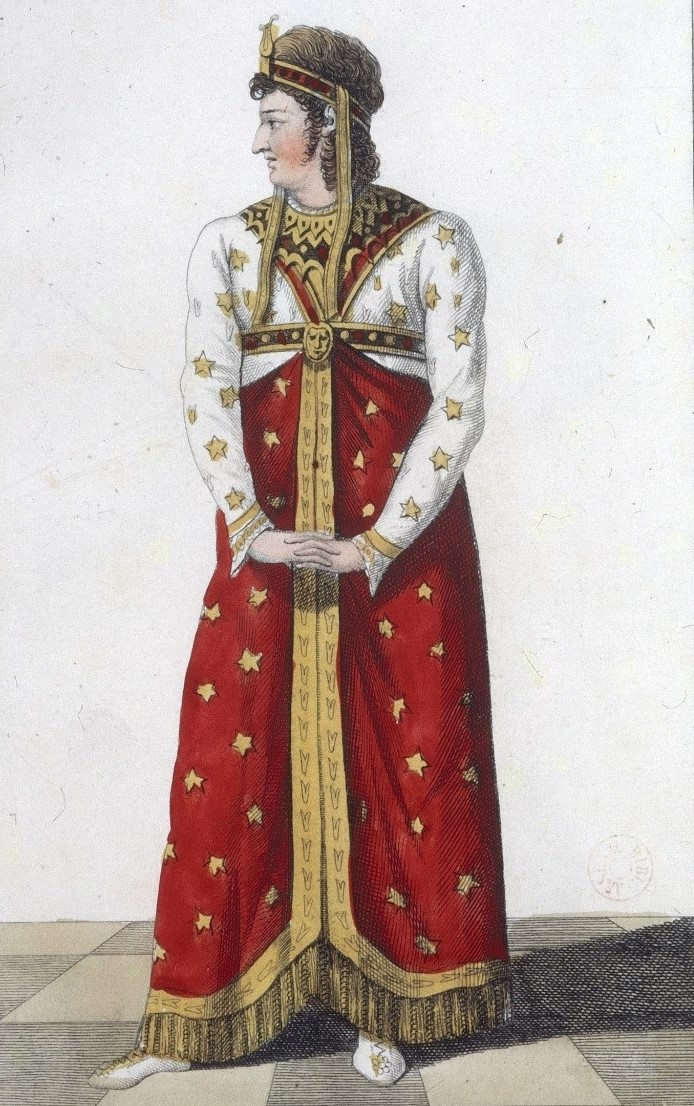
- Jean Elleviou in the title role
- Librettist: Alexandre Duval
- Language: French
- Based on: Story of Joseph from the Book of Genesis
- Premiere: 17 February 1807; Opéra-Comique (Théâtre Feydeau), Paris

Joseph (also known as Joseph en Égypte) is an opéra comique in three acts by the French composer Étienne Méhul. The libretto, by Alexandre Duval, is based on the Biblical story of Joseph and his brothers. The work was first performed by the Opéra-Comique in Paris on 17 February 1807 at the Théâtre Feydeau. It mixes musical numbers with spoken dialogue and is described in both the libretto and the printed announcement for the opening night as a drame en trois actes, mêlé de chant, although the Méhul scholar Elizabeth Bartlet catalogues it as an opéra en prose.

== Background ==
Méhul probably met Duval, an ex-soldier and actor, at the salon of Sophie Gay and suggested composing an opera on the Biblical story of Joseph (Genesis 37–45). In writing Joseph, Méhul and his librettist may have been trying to exploit the contemporary vogue for operas on religious themes and the French fascination for Egypt after Napoleon's expedition to the country in 1798. Duval was directly inspired by Pierre Baour-Lormian's verse tragedy Omasis, ou Joseph en Égypte, which had appeared in September 1806.

== Performance history ==
Méhul in 1799; portrait by Antoine Gros

The opera was a critical success and in 1810 it was awarded a prize for the best piece staged by the Opéra-Comique in the previous decade. Nevertheless, it ran for only a few weeks after its premiere and, although it enjoyed several revivals in France in the 19th century, it was more favourably received in Italy, Belgium and Germany, where it was often performed as an oratorio (the many choral and ensemble numbers outweigh those for the soloists). Carl Maria von Weber praised the score, which he conducted in Dresden in 1817 under the title Jacob und seine Söhne. In 1812 he composed piano variations (Opus 18) on the aria À peine sorti de l'enfance. Gustav Mahler conducted a performance in Olmütz in 1883. A new edition by Richard Strauss was given at the Dresden State Opera in November 1920. There was a new French production in Paris to mark the bicentenary of the French Revolution in 1989.

== Musical style ==
According to the writer Stephen C. Meyer, Méhul "used a self-consciously austere style, the musical counterpart of the pure and noble faith of the Hebrews" when composing Joseph. Berlioz discussed the opera in his Evenings with the Orchestra, where he describes the music "almost throughout" as "simple, touching, rich in felicitous, though not very daring modulations, full of broad and vibrant harmonies and graceful figures in the accompaniment, while its expression is always true." He later qualifies this, by writing in Joseph, "simplicity is carried to a point which it is dangerous to approach so closely ... in its learned soberness [the] orchestra lacks colour, energy, movement, and the indescribable something which gives life. Without adding a single instrument to those of Méhul, it would, I think, have been possible to give the whole the qualities one regrets not finding in it."

Joseph's tenor aria, "Vainement Pharaon ... Champs paternels, Hébron, douce vallée" has been recorded by many singers, including John McCormack, Georges Thill, Richard Tauber (in German), Raoul Jobin, Léopold Simoneau, Michael Schade and Roberto Alagna.

== Roles ==
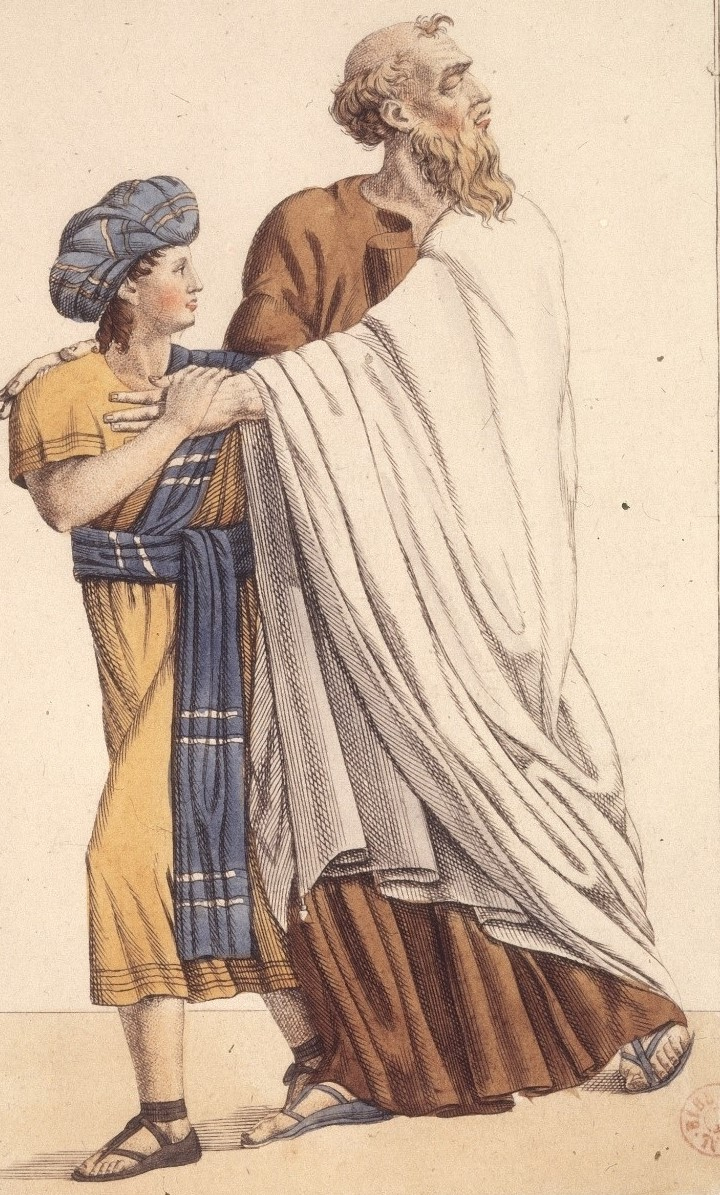
Alexandrine Gavaudan as Benjamin and Jean-Pierre Solié as Jacob

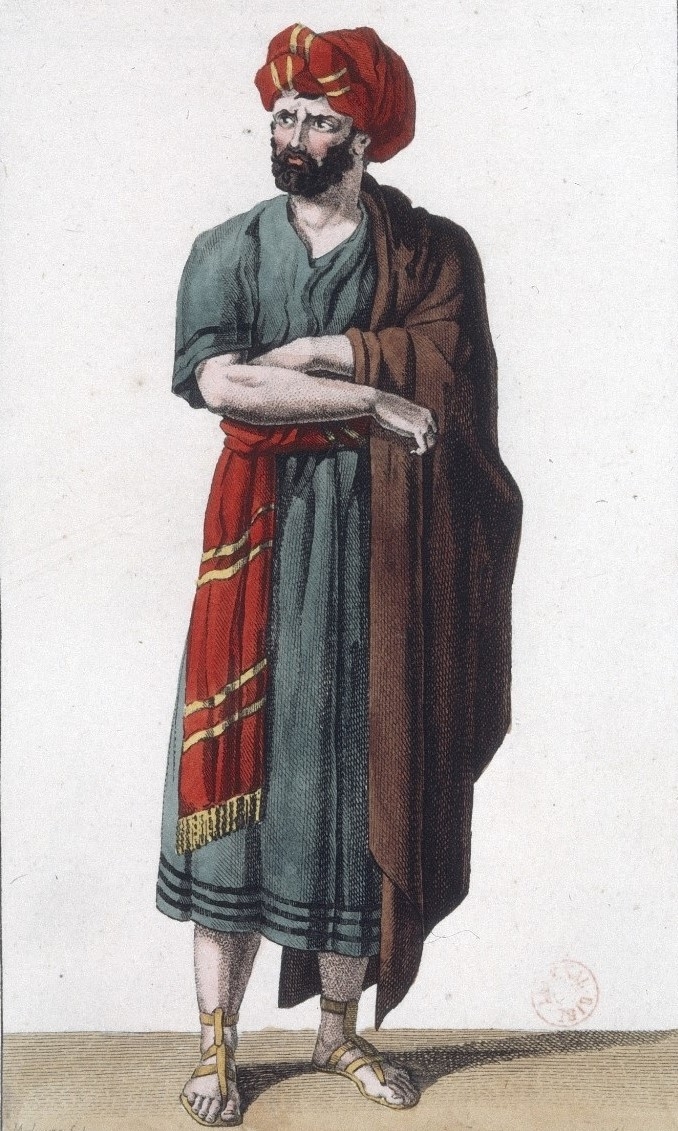
Jean-Baptiste-Sauveur Gavaudan as Siméon

There are no female characters in the opera, but the role of Benjamin is for a soprano playing en travesti.

Roles, voice type, premiere cast
Role	Voice type	Premiere cast, 17 February 1807
Joseph	haute-contre	Jean Elleviou
Benjamin	soprano	Madame Gavaudan
Siméon	tenor	Jean-Baptiste-Sauveur Gavaudan
Jacob	bass	Jean-Pierre Solié
Nephthali	haute-contre	Paul
Ruben	tenor	Pierre Gaveaux
Utobal	bass	Darancourt
An officer	tenor	Allaire
A girl	(not stated)	Aglaë Gavaudan (Note: This character is not a real role, but a simple coryphée, having a special part in certain ensemble pieces; it is not numbered in the libretto cast list but the name of the performer is mentioned in Arthur Pougin, Méhul, sa vie, son génie, son caractère, Paris, Fischbacher, 1893, p. 253.)
A woman storyteller	(not stated)	
Young girls of Memphis, seven sons of Jacob, Israelites, Egyptians

== Synopsis ==
=== Act 1 ===
Many years earlier, Joseph the Israelite, the favourite son of Jacob, was sold into slavery in Egypt by his brothers. Nevertheless, he found favour with the Egyptian pharaoh and rose to become one of the leading men in the country (under the assumed name, in the opera, of Cleophas). Now famine is afflicting Israel and Joseph's brothers arrive at his palace in Memphis to beg for food. Simeon believes it is a punishment for their treatment of Joseph. The brothers do not recognise Joseph, who gives them a warm welcome.

=== Act 2 ===
Having learned that his father (Note: In the Biblical story, Jacob does not accompany his sons to Egypt.) has come to Egypt with his sons, Joseph visits his brothers' tents at night. He catches a glimpse of Jacob sleeping and finds Simeon full of remorse for his crime. At dawn, the Israelites join in prayer. Joseph decides to reveal his identity to his family but is dissuaded by his adviser Utobal (who does not appear in the biblical story).

=== Act 3 ===
Joseph attempts to defend himself to the pharaoh against accusations that he has been too kind to the foreigners. Meanwhile, Simeon tells his father the truth about what he and his brothers did to Joseph. Jacob angrily denounces them but Joseph and Benjamin (the only innocent son) plead for mercy for the guilty brothers. When Jacob relents, Joseph finally reveals his true identity and tells them that the pharaoh has granted them all sanctuary in Egypt.

== Variations by other composers ==
Franz Xaver Mozart (son of Wolfgang Amadeus Mozart) wrote a set of Five Variations on a Romance from Méhul's Joseph, Op. 23, published in 1820. This work was until quite recently mistakenly attributed to the young Liszt. A copyist's manuscript of the work noted that it was par le jeune Liszt, and the work published in good faith by the Neue Liszt-Ausgabe in 1990, catalogued as Liszt's S147a. Liszt scholar Leslie Howard recorded the work in similar good faith in 1992 for his series of recordings of the complete music for solo piano by Liszt (for the disc entitled The Young Liszt). But Howard noted in his sleeve notes for the release of the disc a few months later, "It has since been established that the attribution is false and that the work is from the pen of Mozart's son Franz Xaver, and was published as his opus 23 in 1820. But since the work remains unknown and unrecorded, like the vast majority of F X Mozart's output, and since the writing is not vastly different from some of the other pieces in this collection, it was thought best not to discard it."

Other composers who wrote piano works on themes from Joseph include Louis-Emmanuel Jadin (Fantaisies pour piano sur les romances de Joseph et de Benjamin, 1807), and Henri Herz (Variations de bravoure sur la Romance de "Joseph", Op. 20).

== Recordings ==
- La Légende de Joseph en Egypte, complete opera conducted by Claude Bardon with the Orchestre Regional de Picardie, Laurence Dale (Joseph), René Massis, Brigitte Lafon, Frédéric Vassar, Natalie Dessay, Antoine Normand, Pierre Jorquera. Recorded in 1989. Le Chant du Monde 2-CD
- Joseph in Aegypten, two versions of the work (in German, without dialogue) both on the same release: (a) Alexander Welitsch, Libero di Luca, Horst Günter, Ursula Zollenkopf, NWDR Chor and orchestra of the NWDR, Wilhelm Schüchter; (b) Alexander Welitsch, Josef Traxel, Bernhard Michaelis, Friederike Sailer, Stuttgart Radio Symphony Orchestra, Südfunk-Chor, Alfons Rischner. Both recorded in 1955. Gala 2004 2-CD
