= Natalia Iretskaya =

Russian opera singer (1843–1922)

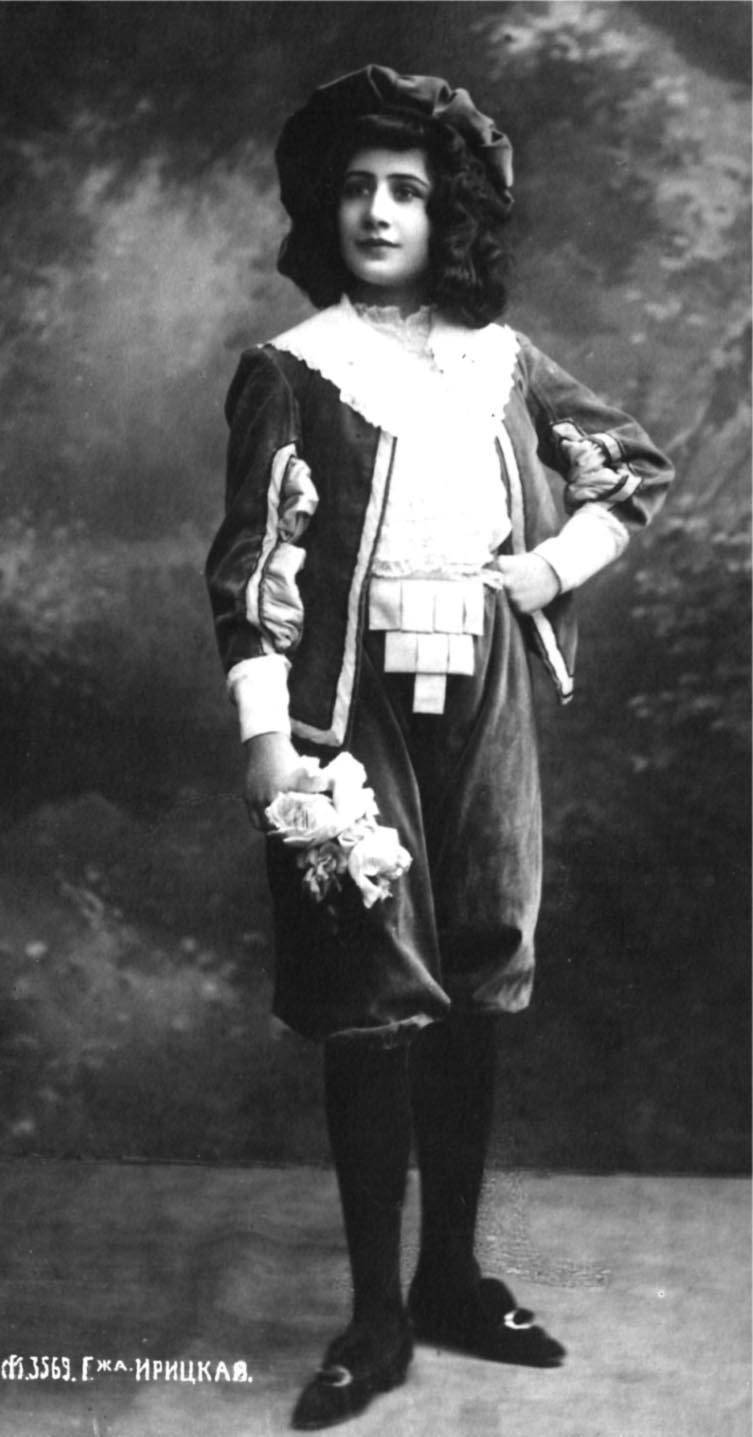
Natalia Alexandrovna Iretskaya

Natalia or Nataliya Aleksandrovna Iretskaya (Russian: Наталия Александровна Ирецкая; 1843 – 15 November 1922) was a Russian singer and teacher of singing. Vocally, she is best known as a soprano.

== Biography ==
She was born in 1843 and graduated from the Saint Petersburg Conservatory, where she studied with Henriette Nissen-Saloman (a pupil of Manuel Patricio Rodríguez García).

She also studied in Paris with Pauline Viardot (a daughter and pupil of Manuel García). In 1874, she taught singing in the Saint Petersburg Conservatory, and became a professor in 1881.

== Pupils ==
Among her pupils were:

- Nadezhda Zabela-Vrubel,
- Lydia Lipkowska,
- Oda Slobodskaya,
- Elena Katulskaya,
- Lyubov Andreyeva-Delmas,
- Ksenia Dorliak (mother of Nina Dorliak),
- Aikanush Danielyan,
- Elizaveta Petrenko, and others.
