= Lyubov Andreyeva-Delmas =

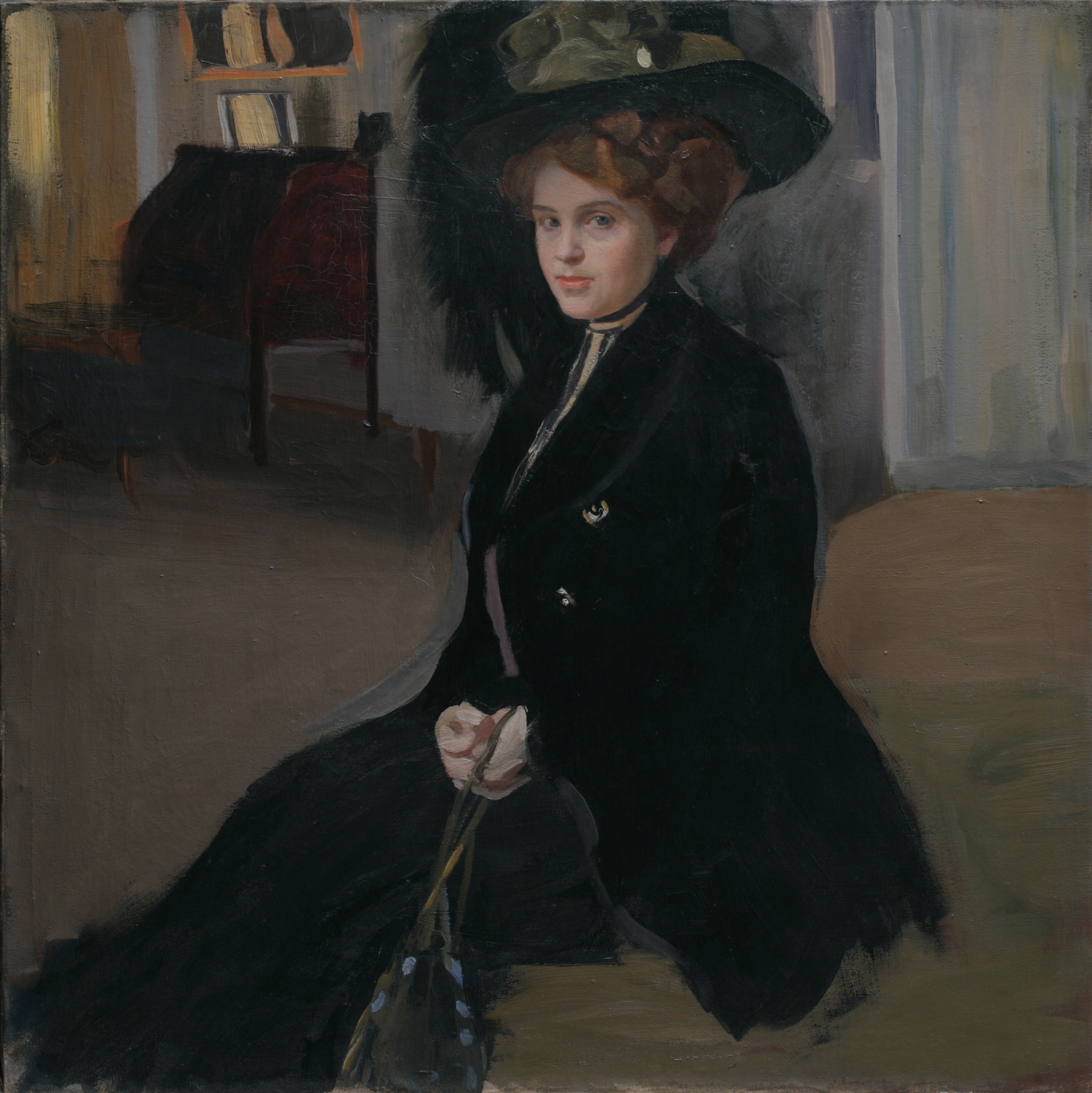
Portrait of Lyubov Andreyeva-Delmas by Oleksandr Murashko, 1908-1909

Lyubov Andreyeva-Delmas (Russian: Любовь Андреева-Дельмас; Ukrainian: Любов Андреєва-Дельмас), born Lyubov Oleksandrivna Tyshchynska (Ukrainian: Любов Олександрівна Тищинська; 27 September 1884, Chernihiv–30 April 1969, Leningrad) was a Russian opera singer of Ukrainian ancestry. She became famous for her performance of Carmen on the stage of Saint Petersburg Opera, and was also active as a chamber singer and pedagogue.

== Biography ==
Lyubov Tyshchynska was born in 1884 in Chernihiv (at the time Chernigov, part of the Russian Empire). Her father Oleksandr Tyshchynskyi worked as a clerk at a local department of the State Bank, served as a leader of the local zemstvo and was active in the city's Ukrainian community. Lyubov's mother Zelina (née Delmas), a teacher of music and languages, provided her with basic education. Lyubov and her parents had friendly relations with the families of Mykhailo Kotsiubynsky, Leonid Hlibov, Borys Hrinchenko and Sofia Rusova, who lived nearby.

After graduating from a gymnasium, in 1898 Lyubov enrolled in the Saint Petersburg Conservatory, studying in the singing class of Natalia Iretskaya. Having finished her education in 1905, she worked at the Solodovnikov Theatre in Moscow, before moving to Kyiv Opera in 1908. In 1910 she returned to Saint Petersburg. In 1911-1914 Delmas participated in the Russian Seasons in Monte Carlo and Paris. Starting from 1913 she performed at the Musical Drama Theatre in Petrograd, before moving to Saint Petersburg Opera in 1919. Starting from 1923 Delmas performed a number of concert tours around Russia. After 1932 she worked as a teacher at the Leningrad Conservatory.

== Personal life ==
After moving to Saint-Petersburg, Delmas married Pavel Andreyev, a vocalist who would also become her partner on stage. During her work in Kyiv she became the subject of a portrait by Oleksandr Murashko. Delmas also served as a muse for Alexander Blok, who dedicated to her a cycle of poems and several letters.

== Musical and opera career ==
Known for her powerful mezzo-soprano and impressive visual appearance, throughout her career Delmas performed in over 60 operas. Among her partners on the stage were her husband Pavel Andreyev, Mattia Battistini, Enrico Caruso, Titta Ruffo, Leonid Sobinov and Feodor Chaliapin. Delmas's talent was highly evaluated by Alexander Glazunov, Konstantin Stanislavski and Nicolai Malko.

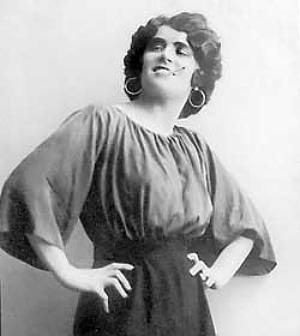
Delmas as Carmen, c. 1914

=== Notable roles ===
- Khivrya (The Fair at Sorochyntsi by Mussorgsky);
- Lyubasha (The Tsar's Bride by Rimsky-Korsakov);
- Marina Mniszech (Boris Godunov by Mussorgsky);
- Marfa (Khovanshchina by Mussorgsky);
- Carmen (eponymous opera by Georges Bizet;
- The Princess (Rusalka by Dargomyzhsky);
- Olga (Eugene Onegin by Tchaikovsky);
- Polina (The Queen of Spades by Tchaikovsky);
- Solokha (Cherevichki by Tchaikovsky);
- Hanna (May Night by Rimsky-Korsakov);
- Spring Beauty (The Snow Maiden by Rimsky-Korsakov);
- Azucena (Il trovatore by Verdi);
- Amneris (Aida by Verdi);
- Page (Les Huguenots by Giacomo Meyerbeer);
- Laura (La Gioconda by Amilcare Ponchielli);
- Delilah (Samson and Delilah by Camille Saint-Saëns);
- Geneviève (Pelléas et Mélisande by Claude Debussy).

=== Recordings ===
Between 1906 and 1914 Delmas recorded 7 compositions on the Grammofon label.

== Sources ==
- Українська музична енциклопедія Т. 1 (А–Д) / Гол. редкол. Г. Скрипник; Національна Академія Наук України; Інститут мистецтвознавства, фольклористики та етнології ім. М. Т. Рильського. – К.: Видавництво Інституту мистецтвознавства, фольклористики та етнології НАН України, 2006. - с.64.
