= 2026 World Triathlon Multisports Championships =

International multisports event in Abu Dhabi, United Arab Emirates

- Venue: Abu Dhabi, United Arab Emirates
- Dates: 13–22 November 2026
- Nations: 45

The 2026 World Triathlon Multisports Championships is an international multisport race festival organised by World Triathlon, held from 13 to 22 November 2026 on Hudayriyat Island in Abu Dhabi, United Arab Emirates.

The festival brings together six separate World Triathlon world championship events across a ten-day schedule for elite, under-23, junior, paratriathlon, and age-group competitors, and is the second of two large events held by World Triathlon annually, the other being the World Triathlon Championship Series Grand Final incorporating the world championships in junior, under-23 and para triathlon and aquabike.

Alongside the Multisports Championships, Hudayriyat Island also hosted the rescheduled season-ending races of the 2026 World Triathlon Championship Series (individual sprint and mixed relay) on 13 and 14 November.

== Championship disciplines ==
The Multisport Championships incorporate multiple standalone World Triathlon-organised world championships into a single host venue model while retaining their individual championship titles and historical lineages:

==== World Triathlon Duathlon Championships ====
(14–15 November): Run–bike–run competition featuring elite, under 23, and junior races over the sprint-standard format (5.1 km run, 29.5 km bike, 5.1 km run), alongside the world duathlon mixed relay championships, para-duathlon, and age-group standard/sprint events.

==== World Triathlon Cross Championships ====
(17 November): Off-road triathlon racing consisting of an open-water swim, mountain bike leg, and trail run. Events held in Elite, under-23 and junior formats, para cross triathlon classes and age-grade chanpionships.

==== World Triathlon Cross Duathlon Championships ====
(19 November): Trail run–mountain bike–trail run competition.

==== World Triathlon Aquathlon Championships ====
(20 November): Continuous swim–run race.

==== World Triathlon Long Distance Championships ====
(22 November): Endurance-distance swim–bike–run championship.

==== World Triathlon Long Distance Aquabike Championships ====
(22 November): age-group endurance swim–bike competition held concurrently with the Long Distance Triathlon.

While the World Triathlon Championship Series Abu Dhabi event was held alongside the other events in the festival, it is not considered a part of the Multisports Championships.

== Schedule ==
All times are local (GST, UTC+04:00).

Date	Championship	Events
13 November	Opening Ceremony	Parade of Nations & Opening Ceremony
14 November	Duathlon	Elite/under 23 Men & Women, Junior Men & Women, age-group Sprint Distance
15 November	Duathlon	2x2 Mixed Relay (Elite & Junior), Para duathlon, age-group Standard Distance
17 November	Cross Triathlon	Elite, under 23, Junior, Para triathlon & age-group
19 November	Cross Duathlon	Elite, under 23, Junior, Para triathlon & age-group
20 November	Aquathlon	Elite, under 23, Junior, Para-aquathlon & age-group
22 November	Long Distance Triathlon & Aquabike	Elite & age-group Long Distance Triathlon; age-group Long Distance Aquabike

== Medalists ==
=== Elite events ===
The following is a summary of the podiums of each of the elite world championship races in each discipline. Full results, and further medalists at junior and under-23 level, as well as champions lists for age-grade and para athlete level can be found at the main article for each discipline.

Discipline	Gold		Silver		Bronze	
2026 World Triathlon Duathlon Championships
Men's individual (details)	Davide Menichelli (ITA)	1:10:04	Martin Oldenhove (BEL)	1:10:39	Adrien Pilleux (FRA)	1:10:44
Women's individual (details)	Lisa Tertsch (GER)	1:22:03	Diana Isakova (RUS)	1:22:08	Jasmijn Bakker (NED)	1:22:27
Mixed duathlon relay (details)	Russia I Valentina Riasova; Dmitrii Karpeev	1:18:31	Netherlands I Jasmijn Bakker; Thomas Cremers	1:19:30	France II; Emma Wasser; Emile Blondel Hermant	1:19:55
2026 World Triathlon Cross Championships
Men's individual (details)	Keller Norland; United States	1:15:57	Eneko De Castro Cativiela; Spain	1:16:20	Kevin Viñuela; Spain	1:16:36
Women's individual (details)	Marina Muñoz Hernando; Spain	1:27:46	Alizee Paties; France	1:28:12	Hanna Maksimava; Belarus	1:30:51
2026 World Triathlon Cross Duathlon Championships
Men's individual (details)	Thibaut De Smet; Belgium	1:13:29	Jan Chrzanowski; Poland	1:13:54	Maxim Chané; France	1:13:56
Women's individual (details)	Hanna Maksimava; Belarus	1:25:22	Svetlana Chizhikova; Russia	1:26:59	Sofiya Pryyma; Ukraine	1:30:53
2026 World Triathlon Aquathlon Championships
Men's individual (details)	Christopher Perham; Great Britain	30:27	Kevin Viñuela; Spain	30:37	Damian Suarez Couto; Spain	30:38
Women's individual (details)	Valentina Riasova; Russia	34:37	Margot Garabedian; Cambodia	34:40	Iana Chenskaia; Russia	34:41
2026 World Triathlon Long Distance Championships
Men's individual (details)						
Women's individual (details)						

== Multisports Championships medal table ==
Elite champions only.

* Host nation (United Arab Emirates)

Rank	Nation	Gold	Silver	Bronze	Total
1	Russia (RUS)	2	2	1	5
2	Spain (ESP)	1	2	2	5
3	Belgium (BEL)	1	1	0	2
4	Belarus (BLR)	1	0	1	2
5	Germany (GER)	1	0	0	1
5	Great Britain (GBR)	1	0	0	1
5	Italy (ITA)	1	0	0	1
5	United States (USA)	1	0	0	1
9	France (FRA)	0	1	3	4
10	Netherlands (NED)	0	1	1	2
11	Cambodia (CAM)	0	1	0	1
11	Poland (POL)	0	1	0	1
13	Ukraine (UKR)	0	0	1	1
Totals (13 entries)		9	9	9	27

== See also ==
- 2026 World Triathlon Championship Series, which crowns the world champions in elite, under 23 and junior standard-distance triathlon, para triathlon.
