= World Triathlon Cross Duathlon Championships =

Cross duathlon championship competition

The World Triathlon Cross Duathlon Championships is a premier cross duathlon championship competition organised by World Triathlon. The first event took place in 2022 as part of the 2022 World Triathlon Multisport Championships and consisted of a 7km trail run, followed by a 23.2km mountain bike cross-country race and finishing with 3.5km of trail running.

== Venues ==
Year	Date	Location	Race distances (kilometres)		
Year	Date	Location	Run 1	Cycle	Run 2
2022	6 June	Târgu Mureș, Romania	6.5	23.2	3.3
2023	3 May	Sant Antoni, Spain	5.8	20.9	3
2024	22 August	Townsville, Australia	6	20.5	3.5
2025	26 June	Pontevedra, Spain	5.8	23.2	3.2
2026	19 November	Abu Dhabi, United Arab Emirates	6.3	19.7	3.1

== Results ==
=== Men's ===
Year	Gold	Silver	Bronze
(Romania) 2022 Targu Mures	Thibaut De Smet (BEL)	Sébastien Carabin (BEL)	Alessandro Saravalle (ITA)
(Spain) 2023 Ibiza	Sébastien Carabin (BEL)	Jens Emil Sloth (DEN)	Alessandro Saravalle (ITA)
(Australia) 2024 Townsville	Michele Bonacina (ITA)	Sébastien Carabin (BEL)	Benjamin Forbes (AUS)
(Spain) 2025 Pontevedra	Thibaut De Smet (BEL)	Sébastien Carabin (BEL)	Arthur Forissier (FRA)
(United Arab Emirates) 2026 Abu Dhabi	Thibaut De Smet (BEL)	Jan Chrzanowski (POL)	Maxim Chané (FRA)

=== Women's ===
Year	Gold	Silver	Bronze
(Romania) 2022 Targu Mures	Eleonora Peroncini (ITA)	Carina Wasle (AUT)	Noor Dekker (NED)
(Spain) 2023 Ibiza	Diede Diederiks (NED)	Anna Zehnder (SUI)	Eva García (ESP)
(Australia) 2024 Townsville	Marta Menditto (ITA)	Kristína Lapinová (SVK)	Maeve Kennedy (AUS)
(Spain) 2025 Pontevedra	Anna Zehnder (SUI)	Noemi Bogiatto (ITA)	Laura Gillard (AUS)
(United Arab Emirates) 2026 Abu Dhabi	Hanna Maksimava (BLR)	Svetlana Chizhikova (RUS)	Sofiya Pryyma (UKR)

=== Medal table ===
Rank	Nation	Gold	Silver	Bronze	Total
1	Belgium	4	3	0	7
2	Italy	3	1	2	6
3	Switzerland	1	1	0	2
4	Netherlands	1	0	1	2
5	Belarus	1	0	0	1
6	Austria	0	1	0	1
6	Denmark	0	1	0	1
6	Poland	0	1	0	1
6	Russia	0	1	0	1
6	Slovakia	0	1	0	1
11	Australia	0	0	3	3
12	France	0	0	2	2
13	Spain	0	0	1	1
13	Ukraine	0	0	1	1
Totals (14 entries)		10	10	10	30
