= 2026 World Triathlon Aquathlon Championships =

International aquathlon competition in Abu Dhabi, United Arab Emirates

- Venue: Hudayriyat Island, Abu Dhabi, United Arab Emirates
- Dates: 20 November 2026

Champions
- Men: Christopher Perham (GBR)
- Women: Valentina Riasova (RUS)

The 2026 World Triathlon Aquathlon Championships is an aquathlon championship competition organised by World Triathlon. The event took place on 20 November 2026 on Hudayriyat Island in Abu Dhabi, United Arab Emirates, as part of the 2026 World Triathlon Multisport Championships.

== Format ==
Unlike the previous edition in Pontevedra, which used a cold-water swim-run format, the 2026 championships returned to a standard run-swim-run format consisting of a 2.7 km run, a 1.0 km swim, and a 2.6 km run. Alongside the elite races, world titles were contested across under-23, junior, paratriathlon, and age-group divisions.

== Medal summary ==
Games	Gold		Silver		Bronze	
Elite
Elite Men	Christopher Perham; Great Britain	30:27	Kevin Tarek Viñuela Gonzalez; Spain	30:37	Damian Suarez Couto; Spain	30:38
Elite Women	Valentina Riasova; Russia	34:37	Margot Garabedian; Cambodia	34:40	Iana Chenskaia; Russia	34:41
Under-23
U23 Men	Semen Kashitsyn; Russia	31:07	Filip Vilenica; Croatia	32:12	Tin Rebic; Croatia	32:25
U23 Women	Iana Chenskaia; Russia	34:41	Manon Taurin; France	36:01	Alina Sinevich; Belarus	37:15
Junior
Junior Men	Damian Suarez Couto; Spain	30:38	Arthur Baigidin; Russia	32:36	Ali Rzazade; Azerbaijan	33:23
Junior Women	Laura Dugovičová; Slovakia	35:04	Sofia Tikhonova; Russia	35:42	Anja Bezlaj; Slovenia	38:06

== Medal table ==
* Host nation (United Arab Emirates)

Rank	Nation	Gold	Silver	Bronze	Total
1	Russia (RUS)	3	2	1	6
2	Spain (ESP)	1	1	1	3
3	Great Britain (GBR)	1	0	0	1
3	Slovakia (SVK)	1	0	0	1
5	Croatia (CRO)	0	1	1	2
6	Cambodia (CAM)	0	1	0	1
6	France (FRA)	0	1	0	1
8	Azerbaijan (AZE)	0	0	1	1
8	Belarus (BLR)	0	0	1	1
8	Slovenia (SLO)	0	0	1	1
Totals (10 entries)		6	6	6	18

== Results ==
=== Men elite ===
Rank	Athlete	Nation	Run	T1	Swim	T2	Run	Overall time
1st place, gold medalist(s)	Christopher Perham	Great Britain	08:12	0:39	12:51	0:44	08:01	30:27
2nd place, silver medalist(s)	Kevin Tarek Viñuela Gonzalez	Spain	08:11	0:42	12:46	0:41	08:17	30:37
3rd place, bronze medalist(s)	Damian Suarez Couto	Spain	08:10	0:43	12:48	0:42	08:15	30:38
4	Grigory Antipov	Russia	08:13	0:41	13:01	0:40	08:05	30:40
5	Pavel Sorokin	Russia	08:23	0:39	12:38	0:41	08:26	30:47
6	Mikita Katsianeu	Belarus	08:11	0:43	13:01	0:44	08:14	30:53
7	Semen Kashitsyn	Russia	08:13	0:40	13:03	0:39	08:32	31:07
8	Šimon Koblížek	Czech Republic	08:12	0:49	13:27	0:46	08:54	32:08
9	Filip Vilenica	Croatia	08:40	0:44	13:11	0:42	08:55	32:12
10	Tin Rebic	Croatia	08:49	0:43	12:49	0:46	09:18	32:25
11	Arthur Baigidin	Russia	08:24	0:41	13:24	0:45	09:22	32:36
12	Jan Chrzanowski	Poland	08:43	0:42	14:00	0:41	08:43	32:49
13	Ali Rzazade	Azerbaijan	08:41	0:45	13:47	0:49	09:21	33:23
14	Alex Mandak	Slovakia	08:24	0:42	14:22	0:50	09:22	33:40
15	Vito Linarić	Croatia	08:39	0:45	14:23	0:48	09:31	34:06
16	Malte Deters	Germany	09:10	0:47	14:52	0:48	09:54	35:31
17	Mario Brezovski	North Macedonia	09:30	0:42	14:23	0:50	10:18	35:43
18	Luka Rebić	Croatia	09:42	0:48	14:06	0:49	10:30	35:55
19	Pablo Benko	Croatia	09:53	0:53	14:49	0:47	10:09	36:31
20	Michal Michalica	Slovakia	09:17	0:43	16:10	0:43	09:51	36:44
21	Lukas Marek	Czech Republic	09:31	0:48	16:14	0:55	11:10	38:38
DSQ	Denis Kolobrodov	Russia	08:18	0:39	13:02	0:40	08:53	31:32
DSQ	Jonay Alvarez Almazan	Spain	08:10	0:42	12:51	0:41	08:27	30:51
DSQ	Matthew Green	United Arab Emirates	09:30	0:48	16:00	0:50	10:41	37:49

=== Women elite ===
Rank	Athlete	Nation	Run	T1	Swim	T2	Run	Overall time
1st place, gold medalist(s)	Valentina Riasova	Russia	08:47	0:44	15:23	0:44	08:59	34:37
2nd place, silver medalist(s)	Margot Garabedian	Cambodia	09:23	0:46	14:11	0:50	09:30	34:40
3rd place, bronze medalist(s)	Iana Chenskaia	Russia	08:58	0:44	14:40	0:50	09:29	34:41
4	Hanna Maksimava	Belarus	09:15	0:41	14:53	0:43	09:29	35:01
5	Laura Dugovičová	Slovakia	09:14	0:40	15:02	0:45	09:23	35:04
6	Marina Muñoz Hernando	Spain	09:20	0:45	14:44	0:45	09:42	35:16
7	Sofia Tikhonova	Russia	09:26	01:10	14:27	0:55	09:44	35:42
8	Ivana Kuriackova	Slovakia	09:17	0:49	15:05	0:52	09:53	35:56
9	Manon Taurin	France	09:39	0:48	14:36	0:45	10:13	36:01
10	Alina Sinevich	Belarus	09:47	0:48	15:25	0:55	10:20	37:15
11	Viva Kovač	Croatia	09:46	0:52	16:07	0:52	09:47	37:24
12	Christina Durbin	Great Britain	09:58	0:46	15:51	0:48	10:04	37:27
13	Anja Bezlaj	Slovenia	09:38	0:46	16:15	0:51	10:36	38:06
14	Iva Pavlovic	Serbia	10:11	0:52	15:36	0:57	10:54	38:30
15	Lana Gavrilović	Serbia	10:30	0:53	15:12	0:55	11:07	38:37
16	Maéva Doutau	France	10:10	0:52	16:34	0:53	10:25	38:54
17	Zeljka Milicic	Croatia	10:20	0:48	16:29	0:56	10:26	38:59
18	Karmen Fabris	Croatia	10:19	0:50	15:31	0:54	11:39	39:13
19	Sophie Fischer	Germany	10:47	01:00	15:34	01:00	11:03	39:24
20	Ivana Radetić	Croatia	11:00	0:57	16:11	01:03	11:44	40:55
21	Viviana Popovičová	Slovakia	10:10	0:54	18:08	01:02	10:43	40:57
22	Anja Škunca	Croatia	10:28	01:07	17:57	0:55	10:53	41:20
23	Ana Lucic	Croatia	11:22	01:05	16:13	01:14	11:54	41:48
24	Shahd Walid	Egypt	11:03	01:25	18:47	01:11	12:08	44:34
25	Takara Glicksman	Ireland	12:17	01:23	19:50	01:04	12:36	47:10

=== Men under 23 ===
Rank	Athlete	Nation	Run	T1	Swim	T2	Run	Overall time
1st place, gold medalist(s)	Semen Kashitsyn	Russia	08:13	0:40	13:03	0:39	08:32	31:07
2nd place, silver medalist(s)	Filip Vilenica	Croatia	08:40	0:44	13:11	0:42	08:55	32:12
3rd place, bronze medalist(s)	Tin Rebic	Croatia	08:49	0:43	12:49	0:46	09:18	32:25
4	Jan Chrzanowski	Poland	08:43	0:42	14:00	0:41	08:43	32:49
5	Pablo Benko	Croatia	09:53	0:53	14:49	0:47	10:09	36:31
6	Michal Michalica	Slovakia	09:17	0:43	16:10	0:43	09:51	36:44

=== Women under-23 ===
Rank	Athlete	Nation	Run	T1	Swim	T2	Run	Overall time
1st place, gold medalist(s)	Iana Chenskaia	Russia	08:58	0:44	14:40	0:50	09:29	34:41
2nd place, silver medalist(s)	Manon Taurin	France	09:39	0:48	14:36	0:45	10:13	36:01
3rd place, bronze medalist(s)	Alina Sinevich	Belarus	09:47	0:48	15:25	0:55	10:20	37:15
4	Christina Durbin	Great Britain	09:58	0:46	15:51	0:48	10:04	37:27
5	Iva Pavlovic	Serbia	10:11	0:52	15:36	0:57	10:54	38:30
6	Lana Gavrilović	Serbia	10:30	0:53	15:12	0:55	11:07	38:37
7	Karmen Fabris	Croatia	10:19	0:50	15:31	0:54	11:39	39:13
8	Ivana Radetić	Croatia	11:00	0:57	16:11	01:03	11:44	40:55
9	Shahd Walid	Egypt	11:03	01:25	18:47	01:11	12:08	44:34

=== Men junior ===
Rank	Athlete	Nation	Run	T1	Swim	T2	Run	Overall time
1st place, gold medalist(s)	Damian Suarez Couto	Spain	08:10	0:43	12:48	0:42	08:15	30:38
2nd place, silver medalist(s)	Arthur Baigidin	Russia	08:24	0:41	13:24	0:45	09:22	32:36
3rd place, bronze medalist(s)	Ali Rzazade	Azerbaijan	08:41	0:45	13:47	0:49	09:21	33:23
4	Alex Mandak	Slovakia	08:24	0:42	14:22	0:50	09:22	33:40
5	Vito Linarić	Croatia	08:39	0:45	14:23	0:48	09:31	34:06
6	Malte Deters	Germany	09:10	0:47	14:52	0:48	09:54	35:31
7	Mario Brezovski	North Macedonia	09:30	0:42	14:23	0:50	10:18	35:43
8	Luka Rebić	Croatia	09:42	0:48	14:06	0:49	10:30	35:55
9	Lukas Marek	Czech Republic	09:31	0:48	16:14	0:55	11:10	38:38
DSQ	Jonay Alvarez Almazan	Spain	08:10	0:42	12:51	0:41	08:27	30:51
DSQ	Matthew Green	United Arab Emirates	09:30	0:48	16:00	0:50	10:41	37:49

=== Women junior ===
Rank	Athlete	Nation	Run	T1	Swim	T2	Run	Overall time
1st place, gold medalist(s)	Laura Dugovičová	Slovakia	09:14	0:40	15:02	0:45	09:23	35:04
2nd place, silver medalist(s)	Sofia Tikhonova	Russia	09:26	01:10	14:27	0:55	09:44	35:42
3rd place, bronze medalist(s)	Anja Bezlaj	Slovenia	09:38	0:46	16:15	0:51	10:36	38:06
4	Viviana Popovičová	Slovakia	10:10	0:54	18:08	01:02	10:43	40:57
5	Anja Škunca	Croatia	10:28	01:07	17:57	0:55	10:53	41:20
6	Takara Glicksman	Ireland	12:17	01:23	19:50	01:04	12:36	47:10

== Age-group Aquathlon Championships ==
In addition to the elite, elite under-23 and elite junior events, a full series of amateur Age-group champonship races were contested. The champions of each classification are listed below :

Open

16-19 Open	Cole Reid; Great Britain	36:49
20-24 Open	Samuel Wen; United States	37:13
25-29 Open	Tin Kaurić; Croatia	38:19
30-34 Open	Corentin Cousin; France	37:10
35-39 Open	Romulo Dos Santos; Brazil	38:05
40-44 Open	Alex Stoney; Ireland	37:27
45-49 Open	Pip Bennett; Great Britain	37:18
50-54 Open	Ramses Rodriguez; United States	39:54
55-59 Open	Jesper Clausen; Denmark	39:11
60-64 Open	Grzegorz Zgliczynski; Poland	40:46
65-69 Open	Kelvin Spencer; Great Britain	47:55
70-74 Open	Neil Arundel; Great Britain	48:16
75-79 Open	Richard File; Great Britain	01:03:32
80-84 Open	Michael Smallwood; Great Britain	01:01:34
85-89 Open	John Charman; United States	01:38:35

Women

16-19 Female	Margaret Croft; New Zealand	40:34
20-24 Female	Charlotte Walker; Great Britain	39:40
25-29 Female	Gabriella Davey; Great Britain	42:36
30-34 Female	Thomasina Loeffen; New Zealand	44:52
35-39 Female	Sara Perez Sala; Spain	35:52
40-44 Female	Rita Steger; Germany	42:05
45-49 Female	Charlotte Renois; France	42:45
50-54 Female	Niki Whitaker; Great Britain	46:27
55-59 Female	Julianna Batizy-Morley; United States	48:49
60-64 Female	Jayne Baldwin; Great Britain	48:07
65-69 Female	Beverley Childs; Great Britain	54:02
70-74 Female	Susan Griffin-Kaklikian; United States	55:05
75-79 Female	Christine Sleight; Great Britain	01:06:47
80-84 Female	Susan Thompson; United States	01:18:59

== Para Aquathlon Championships ==
A series of para aquathlon championships were also held. In most cases, the fields were too small to award full sets of medals but the champions in each class are listed below:

PTWC Men	James Bilham; Great Britain	37:49
PTS2 Men	Vasilii Egorov; Russia	44:53
PTS3 Men	Viktor Chebotarev; Russia	41:24
PTS4 Men	Andrey Tolstikov; Russia	38:29
PTS3 Women	Evgeniya Koroleva; Russia	49:39
PTS5 Men	Aleksandr Konyshev; Russia	36:19
PTS5 Women	Sophie West; Great Britain	44:51
PTVI Men	Andrey Bukov; Russia	37:48
