= Alexandrine Marie Agathe Gavaudan-Ducamel =

French opera singer (1781–1850)

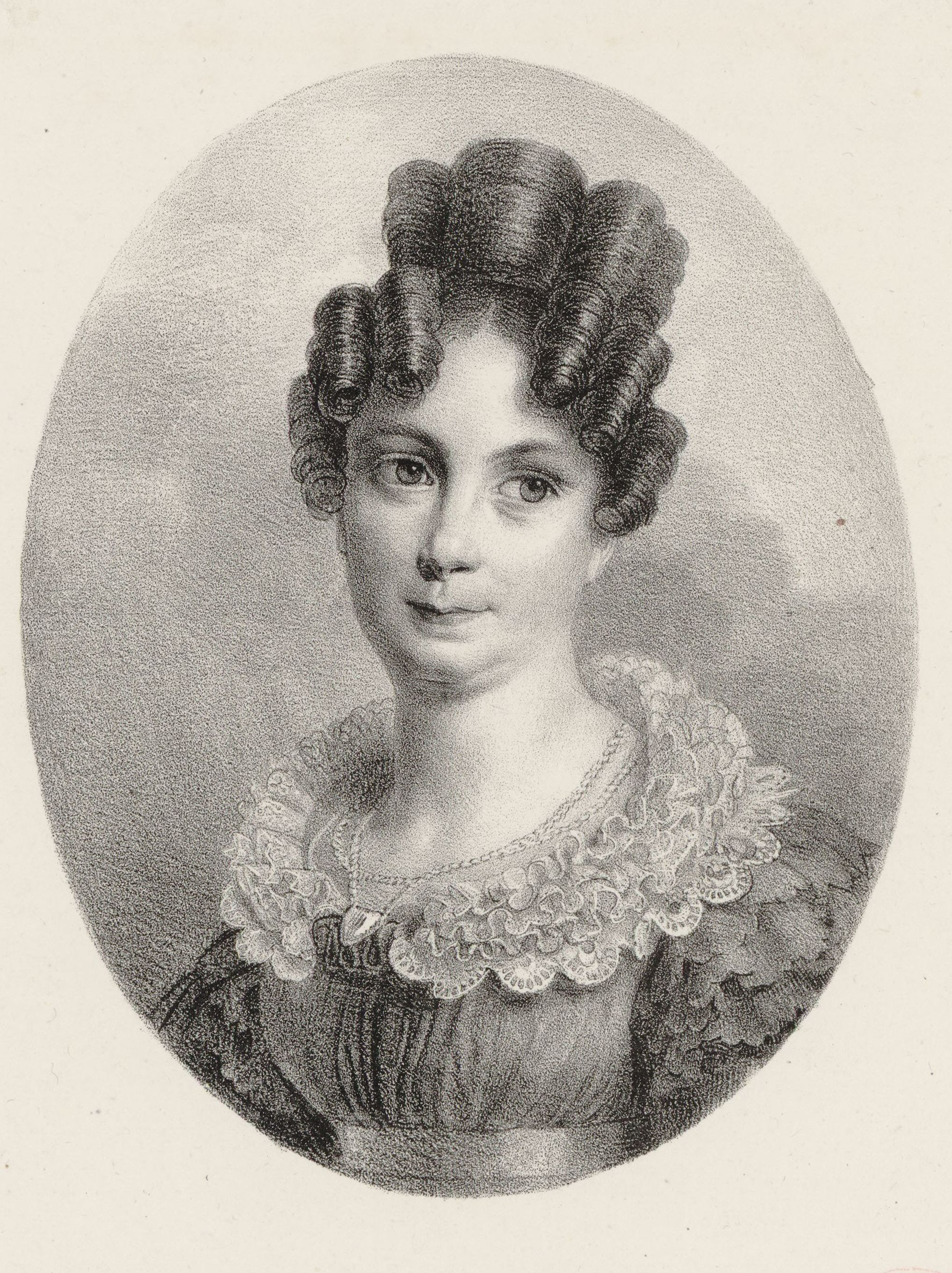
- Born: Alexandrine-Marie-Agathe Ducamel; 15 September 1781; Paris, France
- Died: 24 June 1850 (aged 68); Passy, France
- Other names: Madame Gavaudan; Mademoiselle Maigrot (Note: In the first edition of François-Joseph Fétis's Biographie universelle des musiciens published in 1837, her maiden name was listed as "Maigrot" instead of "Ducamel". The error was corrected by Arthur Pougin who edited the 2nd edition of the Biographie universelle. After a lengthy investigation, Pougin concluded that she may have initially been signed to the chorus of the Opéra Comique as "Mademoiselle Maigrot", and subsequent writers erroneously assumed that this was her maiden name rather than a stage name. The maiden name of "Maigrot" persists in some 19th-century sources.)
- Occupation: Opera singer (soprano)
- Spouse: Jean-Baptiste-Sauveur Gavaudan

Alexandrine Marie Agathe Gavaudan-Ducamel (15 September 1781 – 24 June 1850) was a French opera singer who sang leading soprano roles at the Opéra Comique for over 20 years. Born in Paris with the surname "Ducamel", she later married the tenor Jean-Baptiste-Sauveur Gavaudan after which she generally performed under the name Madame Gavaudan. She retired from the stage in 1822 and spent her later years in Passy where she died at the age of 68.

== Life and career ==
Gavaudan-Ducamel was born in Paris and initially studied music under François-Joseph Hérold, the father of the composer Ferdinand Hérold. By the age of 15, she had performed as a pianist in a well-received concert, part of the series organized by Pierre-Jean Garat at the Théâtre Feydeau. On 23 May 1798, shortly after her marriage to the tenor Jean-Baptiste-Sauveur Gavaudan (1771–1840), she made her debut as a singer with the Opéra Comique. Her debut role was as the comtesse d'Arles in Étienne Méhul's Euphrosine et Coradin. Later that year she created the role of Auguste in the world premiere of Henri-Montan Berton's Le rendez-vous supposé ou Le souper de famille.

Apart from some performances in Belgium in 1817, she would remain at the Opéra Comique for her entire career, creating numerous roles in their world premieres and specialising in jeunes dugazons roles, the light, romantic soubrette roles originally identified with Louise-Rosalie Lefebvre. Her voice type and slender physique also lent itself to en travesti roles portraying boys and young men, including Benjamin in Méhul's Joseph which she performed at its premiere on 17 February 1807. Her only appearances outside the Opéra Comique were thirteen guest performances at the Théâtre Royal de la Monnaie in Brussels during the 1817–1818 season when her husband was director of that opera house.

Gavaudan-Ducamel gave her farewell performance on 19 December 1822 at the Théâtre Feydeau in an intermezzo entitled Les adieux au public, for which Eugène Scribe had written the libretto. She was joined in the performance by several veteran singers of the Théâtre des Variétés and Opéra Comique companies, including her husband, Jean-Baptiste-Sauveur Gavaudan, who had retired from the Opéra Comique in 1816 but continued to sing in provincial theatres. In her retirement years Gavaudan-Ducamel taught singing privately in Paris. She later moved to Passy where she remained active in amateur performances at a small theatre in what is now the Jardin du Ranelagh. She was also a frequent participant in the salons and musical soirées held by the Orfila family who had a summer house in Passy.

Gavaudan-Ducamel died in Passy in 1850 at the age of 68. Her husband had died ten years earlier. The couple had two children. Their son, Constant-Edouard Gavaudan, was an officer in a French infantry regiment, stationed in North Africa. He was killed near Blida in 1838. Their daughter, Marie Agathe Gavaudan who performed under the name Madame Raimbaux, was an opera singer of some note who studied under Manuel García. She appeared at the Teatro San Carlo in Naples and with the Théâtre-Italien company in Paris where she specialised in Rossinian roles. She retired from the stage in 1836.

== Roles created ==
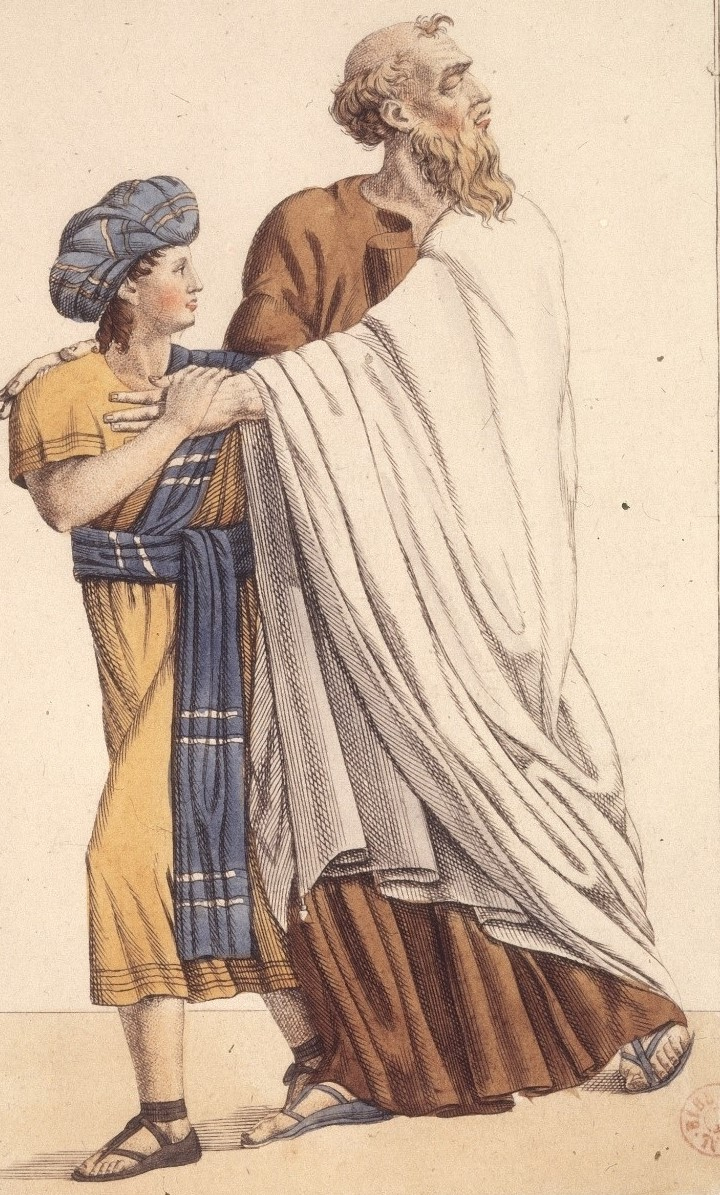
Gavaudan-Ducamel (left) as Benjamin in Méhul's Joseph

Roles sung by Gavaudan-Ducamel in world premieres included:

- Auguste in Le rendez-vous supposé ou Le souper de famille, composed by Henri-Montan Berton, premiered Opéra-Comique (Salle Favart), 5 August 1798
- Marcéline in Les deux journées, composed by Luigi Cherubini, premiered Opéra-Comique (Salle Feydeau), 16 January 1800
- Zétulbé in Le calife de Bagdad, composed by François Adrien Boieldieu, premiered Opéra-Comique (Salle Favart), 16 September 1800
- Julie in Ma Tante Aurore, composed by François Adrien Boieldieu, premiered Opéra-Comique (Salle Feydeau), 13 January 1803
- Zélis-Zélie in Aline, reine de Golconde, composed by Henri-Montan Berton, premiered Opéra-Comique (Salle Feydeau), 3 September 1803
- Lisette in La romance, composed by Henri-Montan Berton, premiered Opéra-Comique (Salle Feydeau), 26 January 1804
- Emma in Milton, composed by Gaspare Spontini, premiered Opéra-Comique (Salle Favart), 27 November 1804
- Angélique in Les maris garçons, composed by Henri-Montan Berton, premiered Opéra-Comique (Salle Feydeau), 5 July 1806
- Benjamin in Joseph, composed by Étienne Méhul, premiered Opéra-Comique (Salle Feydeau), 17 February 1807
- Edmond in Françoise de Foix, composed by Henri-Montan Berton, premiered Opéra-Comique (Salle Feydeau), 28 January 1809
- Madame de Randan in Bayard à la ferté ou Le siège de Mézières, composed by Charles-Henri Plantade, premiered Opéra-Comique (Salle Feydeau), 3 October 1811
- Olivier in Jean de Paris, composed by François Adrien Boieldieu, premiered Opéra-Comique (Salle Feydeau), 4 April 1812
- Florette in Les rosières, composed by Ferdinand Hérold, premiered Opéra-Comique (Salle Feydeau), 27 January 1817
- Rose d'amour in Le petit chaperon rouge, composed by François Adrien Boieldieu, premiered Opéra-Comique (Salle Feydeau), 30 June 1818
