= 2026 World Triathlon Cross Championships =

International cross triathlon competition

- Venue: Hudayriyat Island
- Location: Abu Dhabi, United Arab Emirates
- Date: 17 November 2026

Champions
- Men: Keller Norland (USA) (elite and under-23); Aleksei Trofimenko (RUS) (junior)
- Women: Marina Muñoz Hernando (ESP) (elite); Svetlana Chizhikova (RUS) (under-23); Daria Volkova (RUS) (junior)

The 2026 World Triathlon Cross Championships were held on 17 November 2026 in Abu Dhabi, United Arab Emirates,. It formed the second set of championships included as part of the 2026 World Triathlon Multisports Championships, crowning world champions in the off-road discipline of cross triathlon.

== Format ==
The elite and under-23 races are contested simultaneously over hard off-road terrain, consisting of a 1 km non-wetsuit swim, a 19.7 km mountain bike leg, and a 6.3 km trail run.

The junior races contested a sprint cross distance over similar terrain comprising a 500 m swim, a 10.2 km mountain bike leg, and a 3.1 km trail run.

A full program of para cross and age-group cross events were also held.

== Medal summary ==
Games	Gold		Silver		Bronze	
Men's elite	Keller Norland; United States	1:15:57	Eneko De Castro Cativiela; Spain	1:16:20	Kevin Viñuela; Spain	1:16:36
Women's elite	Marina Muñoz Hernando; Spain	1:27:46	Alizee Paties; France	1:28:12	Hanna Maksimava; Belarus	1:30:51
Men's under-23	Keller Norland; United States	1:15:57	Eneko De Castro Cativiela; Spain	1:16:20	Dmitrii Karpeev; Russia	1:17:52
Women's under-23	Svetlana Chizhikova; Russia	1:31:10	María López Faraudo; Mexico	1:34:58	Vlada Khristoforova; Russia	1:41:54 no medal awarded
Men's junior	Aleksei Trofimenko; Russia	43:30	Evan Tosh; Ireland	44:16	Dmitrii Shamshin; Russia	45:05
Women's junior	Daria Volkova; Russia	50:00	Boróka Zilahy; Hungary	55:27 no medal awarded	only two entrants	

== Medal table ==
Rank	Nation	Gold	Silver	Bronze	Total
1	Russia (RUS)	3	0	2	5
2	United States (USA)	2	0	0	2
3	Spain (ESP)	1	2	1	4
4	France (FRA)	0	1	0	1
4	Ireland (IRL)	0	1	0	1
4	Mexico (MEX)	0	1	0	1
7	Belarus (BLR)	0	0	1	1
Totals (7 entries)		6	5	4	15

* Russia and Hungary won podium places, but were not awarded medals due to low entrant numbers in both the women's under-23 and junior events.

== Results ==
=== Men ===
Rank	Athlete	Nation	Swim	T1	MTB	T2	Run	Overall time
1st place, gold medalist(s)	Keller Norland	United States	12:30	1:59	39:41	1:12	20:35	1:15:57
2nd place, silver medalist(s)	Eneko De Castro Cativiela	Spain	12:31	1:44	39:37	1:08	21:20	1:16:20
3rd place, bronze medalist(s)	Kevin Tarek Viñuela Gonzalez	Spain	12:17	1:46	40:14	1:09	21:10	1:16:36
4	Lukáš Kočař	Czech Republic	13:13	1:53	38:52	1:12	21:34	1:16:44
5	Maxim Chané	France	13:14	1:54	39:04	1:15	21:52	1:17:19
6	Michele Bonacina	Italy	12:47	1:43	39:21	1:09	22:39	1:17:39
7	Dmitrii Karpeev	Russia	13:10	1:54	40:50	1:11	20:47	1:17:52
8	Federico Spinazzé	Italy	13:14	1:51	39:08	1:22	22:37	1:18:12
9	Jan Chrzanowski	Poland	12:53	1:56	41:09	1:08	21:43	1:18:49
10	Christopher Perham	Great Britain	12:16	1:48	43:38	1:14	22:20	1:21:16
11	Jakub Jencus	Slovakia	15:06	1:55	41:04	1:21	22:28	1:21:54
12	Nicolas Probert Vargas	Mexico	12:14	1:51	45:04	1:15	22:53	1:23:17
13	Wojciech Kopyciński	Poland	14:11	2:06	43:11	1:11	23:15	1:23:54
14	Elian Olasagasti	France	13:16	2:01	44:41	1:17	23:13	1:24:28
15	Ryno Owen	South Africa	15:03	2:00	43:19	1:27	22:48	1:24:37
16	Ivan Zalavtsev	Russia	16:39	2:06	41:38	1:15	23:13	1:24:51
17	Sébastien Carabin	Belgium	19:15	2:01	40:01	1:24	23:01	1:25:42
18	Scott Fisher	South Africa	13:33	2:19	44:09	1:24	25:16	1:26:41
19	Pavel Andreev	Russia	15:08	2:08	42:45	1:24	26:20	1:27:45
20	Tom Jenkins	Australia	16:36	2:16	43:04	1:19	25:53	1:29:08

=== Women ===
Rank	Athlete	Nation	Swim	T1	MTB	T2	Run	Overall time
1st place, gold medalist(s)	Marina Muñoz Hernando	Spain	14:24	1:56	45:35	1:13	24:38	1:27:46
2nd place, silver medalist(s)	Alizée Patiès	France	15:06	2:00	44:25	1:21	25:20	1:28:12
3rd place, bronze medalist(s)	Hanna Maksimava	Belarus	14:52	1:58	46:57	1:14	25:50	1:30:51
4	Chizhikova Svetlana	Russia	15:54	2:06	47:19	1:16	24:35	1:31:10
5	Marta Menditto	Italy	15:58	2:05	46:50	1:26	26:14	1:32:33
6	Sofiya Pryyma	Ukraine	15:59	1:59	47:22	1:29	26:57	1:33:46
7	Beatriz Ferreira	Portugal	16:36	2:08	46:37	1:26	27:25	1:34:12
8	Lydia Dant	Great Britain	15:55	2:12	48:07	1:45	26:46	1:34:45
9	María López Faraudo	Mexico	15:08	1:55	52:18	1:22	24:15	1:34:58
10	Ivana Kuriačková	Slovakia	14:24	1:59	53:13	1:19	26:48	1:37:43
11	Vlada Khristoforova	Russia	18:31	2:20	50:00	1:23	29:40	1:41:54
12	Tory Sigmond	United States	25:20	2:56	59:31	1:58	31:06	2:00:51
—	Valentina Riasova	Russia	15:06	—	—	—	—	DNF

=== Under-23 and junior ===
==== Men under-23 ====
Rank	Athlete	Nation	Swim	T1	MTB	T2	Run	Overall time
1st place, gold medalist(s)	Keller Norland	United States	12:30	1:59	39:41	1:12	20:35	1:15:57
2nd place, silver medalist(s)	Eneko De Castro Cativiela	Spain	12:31	1:44	39:37	1:08	21:20	1:16:20
3rd place, bronze medalist(s)	Dmitrii Karpeev	Russia	13:10	1:54	40:50	1:11	20:47	1:17:52
4	Jan Chrzanowski	Poland	12:53	1:56	41:09	1:08	21:43	1:18:49
5	Nicolas Probert Vargas	Mexico	12:14	1:51	45:04	1:15	22:53	1:23:17
6	Elian Olasagasti	France	13:16	2:01	44:41	1:17	23:13	1:24:28
7	Tom Jenkins	Australia	16:36	2:16	43:04	1:19	25:53	1:29:08

==== Women under-23 ====
Rank	Athlete	Nation	Swim	T1	MTB	T2	Run	Overall time
1st place, gold medalist(s)	Chizhikova Svetlana	Russia	15:54	2:06	47:19	1:16	24:35	1:31:10
2nd place, silver medalist(s)	María López Faraudo	Mexico	15:08	1:55	52:18	1:22	24:15	1:34:58
3	Vlada Khristoforova	Russia	18:31	2:20	50:00	1:23	29:40	1:41:54

==== Men Jr ====
Rank	Athlete	Nation	Swim	T1	MTB	T2	Run	Overall time
1st place, gold medalist(s)	Aleksei Trofimenko	Russia	6:33	1:56	22:34	1:07	11:20	43:30
2nd place, silver medalist(s)	Evan Tosh	Ireland	6:24	1:53	23:21	1:08	11:30	44:16
3rd place, bronze medalist(s)	Dmitrii Shamshin	Russia	6:05	1:56	23:16	1:11	12:37	45:05
4	Matthew Ratcliffe	South Africa	7:04	2:07	23:08	1:12	12:53	46:24
5	Bryce Fowler	South Africa	7:50	2:23	25:09	2:16	14:35	52:13
6	Nico De Nysschen	South Africa	8:20	2:41	26:22	1:28	15:54	54:45
7	Arjan Indulkar	India	9:41	3:12	37:20	1:33	18:00	1:09:46

==== Women's jr ====
Rank	Athlete	Nation	Swim	T1	MTB	T2	Run	Overall time
1st place, gold medalist(s)	Daria Volkova	Russia	6:53	2:10	25:27	1:14	14:16	50:00
2	Boróka Zilahy	Hungary	7:38	2:28	27:55	1:37	15:49	55:27

=== Age-group and para cross ===
In addiiton to the six elite class races, a series of age-group and paracross championship races were held. The following table lists the winners of each classification:

Open class

Classfication	Athlete	Overall time
18-19 Open	Ashton Guitry (NZL)	1:37:02
30-34 Open	Arthur Henrique Reis (TRI)	1:35:16
35-39 Open	Andrzej Stadnik (USA)	1:32:47
40-44 Open	Silas Volfing (DEN)	1:31:39
45-49 Open	Christophe Faloppa (FRA)	1:34:42
50-54 Open	Simone Bevilacqua (ITA)	1:45:59
55-59 Open	Georg Harbauer (GER)	1:41:55
60-64 Open	Grzegorz Zgliczynski (POL)	1:36:43
65-69 Open	Janko Železnikar (SLO)	1:45:55
70-74 Open	Gerhard Schlüter (GER)	1:59:10
75-79 Open	Mick Anglim (GBR)	2:39:51

Women's class

Classfication	Athlete	Overall time
30-34 Female	Thomasina Loeffen (NZL)	1:47:46
35-39 Female	Stephanie Scott (NZL)	2:03:18
40-44 Female	Amy Loxley (UAE)	1:51:59
45-49 Female	Magdalena Morup (UAE)	2:19:08
50-54 Female	Candice Gibson (RSA)	2:12:57
55-59 Female	Nathalie Olasagasti (FRA)	1:48:33
60-64 Female	Sabine Greipel (AUT)	2:08:18
65-69 Female	Silvia Brandstetter (SUI)	2:18:25
70-74 Female	Susan Griffin-Kaklikian (USA)	2:20:29

Para cross

Classfication	Athlete	Overall time
PTS4 Men	Andrey Tolstikov (RUS)	56:13
PTS5 Men	Aleksandr Ialchik (RUS)	53:54

* no medals awarded in para cross due to lack of entrants.

Champions table (age-group)

Rank	Nation	Champions
1	New Zealand	3
2	France	2
2	Germany	2
2	United Arab Emirates	2
2	United States	2
6	Austria	1
6	Denmark	1
6	Great Britain	1
6	Italy	1
6	Poland	1
6	Slovenia	1
6	South Africa	1
6	Switzerland	1
6	World Triathlon	1
Total (14 nations)		20
