= Christopher Perham =

British triathlete, aquathlete, and duathlete

Personal information
- Nationality: British
- Born: 24 February 1995 (age 31)

Sport
- Sport: Triathlon, aquathlon, duathlon
Medal record
Representing United Kingdom
Men's aquathlon
World Aquathlon Championships
Gold medal – first place	2026 Abu Dhabi	Elite Men
Silver medal – second place	2023 Ibiza	Elite Men
Bronze medal – third place	2025 Pontevedra	Elite Men
European Aquathlon Championships
Gold medal – first place	2022 Bilbao	Elite Men
Silver medal – second place	2025 Navarra-Pamplona	Elite Men
Men's triathlon
World Triathlon Championships
Gold medal – first place	2014 Edmonton	U23/Jr mixed relay
European Triathlon Championships
Silver medal – second place	2015 Banyoles	U23 mixed relay
Silver medal – second place	2016 Burgas	U23 mixed relay
World University Championships
Gold medal – first place	2016 Nyon	Team Men
Silver medal – second place	2018 Kalmar	Mixed Relay

Christopher Perham (born 24 February 1995), known as Chris Perham is a British triathlete, aquathlete, and duathlete. He won the men's elite race at 2026 World Triathlon Aquathlon Championships in Abu Dhabi, and the 2022 Europe Triathlon Aquathlon Championships in Bilbao, Spain.

== Career ==
=== Junior and under-23 career ===
Perham began his sports triaiing in biathle, a run-swim sport associated with modern pentathlon, but switched to the more endurance-based triathlon stream . Perham began competing internationally in 2013, placing fifth in the 16–19 Male Age-Group Sprint race at the ITU World Triathlon Grand Final in London. In 2014, he finished fourth at the British Sprint Duathlon National Championships in Rockingham and won bronze at the ETU Triathlon Junior European Cup in Nottingham.

Later that year, at the 2014 ITU World Triathlon Grand Final in Edmonton, he placed 15th in the junior men's race, but won gold as part of the Great Britain U23 and junior mixed relay team.

Perham won silver medals in the mixed relay at the ETU Triathlon U23 European Championships in both 2015 at Banyoles, and again 2016 in Burgas . At the 2016 FISU World University Triathlon Championship in Nyon, he placed seventh individually in the elite men's race but earned a team event gold medal.

In 2018, he earned his first senior European Cup podium with a silver medal at the ETU Sprint Triathlon Premium European Cup event in Holton and claimed another silver medal in the mixed relay at the 2018 Kalmar FISU World University Triathlon Championship.

=== Senior multisport and aquathlon titles (2019–present) ===
In March 2019, Perham won gold in the elite men's event at the ETU Indoor Triathlon European Cup in Liévin, France, one of the first continental-level indoor triathlon events. In September 2022, he captured his first official senior continental championship title, winning gold at the Europe Triathlon Aquathlon Championships in Bilbao in a time of 25:38.

Focusing on the aquathlon discipline in which he had been crowned European champion, Perham won a silver medal in the men's elite events at the 2023 World Triathlon Aquathlon Championships in Ibiza He earned a silver at the 2025 Europe Triathlon Aquathlon Championships in Pamplona and bronze at the 2025 World Triathlon Aquathlon Championships in Pontevedra.

In November 2026, Perham secured his first senior world championship when he won gold at the 2026 World Triathlon Aquathlon Championships in Abu Dhabi, following a 10th-place finish at the 2026 World Triathlon Cross Championships.

=== Athletics ===
Alongside his multisport career, Perham competed domestically in track and road running events. World Athletics record personal bests for Perham of 8:35.12 for the 3000 metres in June 2015, 30:28 for the 10 kilometres road race December 2020), and 13:52 for the 5 kilometres road race in April 2021.

=== Outside sport ===
Outside of competing, Perham works in education and youth sports development as a PE teacher and triathlon coordinator.

== Major results ==
Date	Competition	Location	Event	Rank	Time	Ref.
22 August 2014	ETU Triathlon Junior European Cup	Nottingham, Great Britain	Junior Men	3rd place, bronze medalist(s)	00:52:24	
1 September 2014	ITU World Triathlon Grand Final	Edmonton, Canada	U23/Jr. mixed relay	1st place, gold medalist(s)	00:19:39	
26 July 2015	ETU Triathlon U23 European Championships	Banyoles, Spain	U23 mixed relay	2nd place, silver medalist(s)	00:20:51	
19 June 2016	ETU Triathlon U23 European Championships	Burgas	U23. mixed relay	2nd place, silver medalist(s)	00:23:29	
7 August 2016	FISU World University Triathlon Championship	Nyon, Switzerland	Team Men	1st place, gold medalist(s)	01:49:04	
30 June 2018	ETU Sprint Triathlon Premium European Cup Holten	Holten, Netherlands	Elite Men	2nd place, silver medalist(s)	00:55:46	
2 September 2018	FISU World University Triathlon Championship	Kalmar, Sweden	Mixed Relay	2nd place, silver medalist(s)	00:17:54	
2 March 2019	ETU Indoor Triathlon European Cup Liévin	Liévin, France	Elite Men	1st place, gold medalist(s)	00:10:09	
23 September 2022	Europe Triathlon Aquathlon Championships	Bilbao, Spain	Elite Men	1st place, gold medalist(s)	00:25:38	
1 May 2023	World Triathlon Aquathlon Championships	Ibiza, Spain	Elite Men	2nd place, silver medalist(s)	00:29:08	
15 May 2025	Europe Triathlon Aquathlon Championships	Navarra-Pamplona, Spain	Elite Men	2nd place, silver medalist(s)	00:28:34	
27 June 2025	World Triathlon Aquathlon Championships	Pontevedra, Spain	Elite Men	3rd place, bronze medalist(s)	00:28:38	
20 November 2026	World Triathlon Aquathlon Championships	Abu Dhabi, UAE	Elite Men	1st place, gold medalist(s)	00:30:27	
