= Rondeau fantastique sur un thème espagnol =

Composition for piano by Franz Liszt

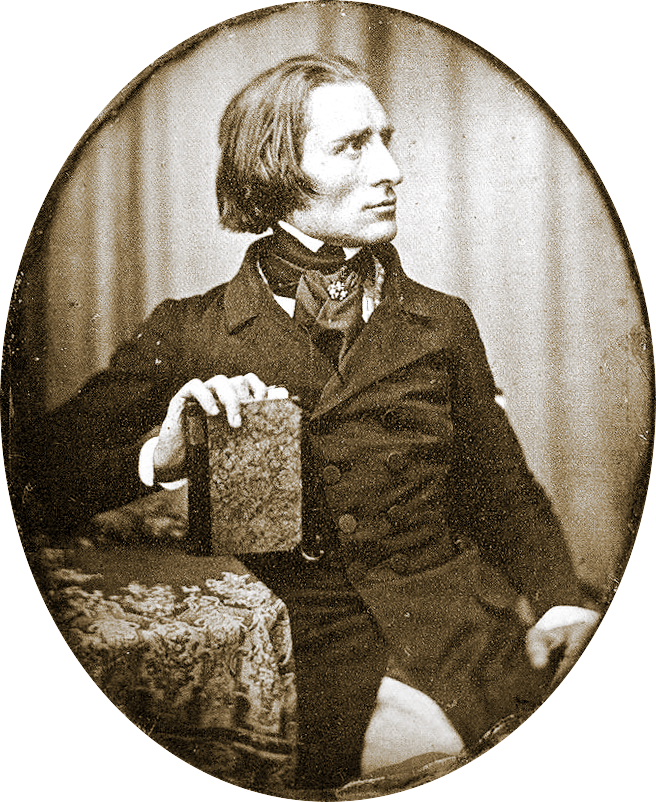
Franz Liszt in 1843

Rondeau fantastique sur un thème espagnol: "El Contrabandista" ("Fantastic Rondo on the Spanish Theme The Smuggler"), S. 252, is a classical musical composition for piano solo by Franz Liszt, written in 1836, and published in 1837 as Liszt's Opus 5 No. 3. It is based on a Spanish song popular at that time. It lasts approximately 8–9 minutes according to the high tempo Liszt assigned, though most pianists play it slower (10–12 minutes) due to its incredible difficulty.

== Overview ==
Liszt's piano piece was based on Manuel Garcia's popular aria "Yo que soy contrabandista" for soprano female singer, guitar, and castanets, from his one-act zarzuela El poeta calculista. The song was made popular by García's daughter, the well-known mezzo-soprano Maria Malibran. Liszt's piece is essentially a set of variations on the song, loosely organized in rondo form. As with Liszt's other piano works based on other composers' pieces, it contains a complete exploration of the elements of the theme. After each excursion the theme keeps coming back around as in a typical rondo.

It has been hailed as one of the most technically challenging solo piano compositions in classical pianism. It contains a great quantity of effects and virtuoso feats, including chord tremolos with accompanying thirds, wide jumps, fast repetitive notes, and arpeggios and octaves at a breakneck tempo, keeping a deciso (decisive) attitude throughout. Compared to La campanella's infamous two-to-three octave jumps, the Rondeau's leaps are two octaves greater.

Liszt initially intended this piece as a bravura finale for his recitals, but hardly ever played it. He performed it in front of George Sand who praised it and wrote extensively about it, and Hector Berlioz hailed it as Liszt's finest work. The modern concert pianist Mikhail Pletnev was eager to play it live, but gave up, calling it "unplayable". Valentina Lisitsa has performed and recorded her interpretation on YouTube (in 2011), including an impromptu performance on a public upright piano at London's St Pancras railway station in 2013. Leslie Howard played the piece at a festival of Spanish music in Madrid in 2015, having recorded it 19 years earlier as part of his complete survey of Liszt's works for solo piano.
