= 2026 World Triathlon Cross Duathlon Championships =

2026 edition of the World Triathlon Cross Duathlon Championships

- Venue: Abu Dhabi, United Arab Emirates
- Dates: 19 November 2026
- Website: Abu Dhabi 2026

Champions
- Men: Thibaut De Smet (BEL); Jan Chrzanowski (POL) (u-23); Aleksei Trofimenko (RUS) (junior)
- Women: Hanna Maksimava (BLR); Svetlana Chizhikova (RUS) (u-23)

The 2026 World Triathlon Cross Duathlon Championships was a cross duathlon competition held on 19 November 2026 in Abu Dhabi, United Arab Emirates to crown the world champions in the discipline for the season.

It was the third championship discipline contested at the 2026 World Triathlon Multisports Championships.

== Format ==
Organised by World Triathlon as part of the 2026 World Triathlon Multisports Championships, the event featured elite, under-23, junior (men only), paratriathlon, and age-group races.

The elite and under-23 competitors raced together, and their course consisted of a 6.3-kilometre trail run, a 19.7-kilometre mountain bike segment, and a final 3.15-kilometre trail run, while junior and para cross duathletes completed a sprint version of roughly half the elite senior course.

Age group athletes also contested the longer course.

== Medalists ==
Games	Gold		Silver		Bronze	
Men's elite details	Thibaut De Smet; Belgium	1:13:29	Jan Chrzanowski; Poland	1:13:54	Maxim Chané; France	1:13:56
Women's elite details	Hanna Maksimava; Belarus	1:25:22	Svetlana Chizhikova; Russia	1:26:59	Sofiya Pryyma; Ukraine	1:30:53
Men's under-23	Jan Chrzanowski; Poland	1:13:54	Elian Olasagasti; France	1:21:26	Tom Jenkins; Australia	1:23:07
Women's under-23	Svetlana Chizhikova; Russia	1:26:59	Vlada Khristoforova; Russia	1:34:22	Daria Volkova; Russia	1:38:14
Men's junior	Aleksei Trofimenko; Russia	42:53	Evan Tosh; Ireland	43:45	Dmitrii Shamshin; Russia	44:05

== Medal table ==
* Host nation (United Arab Emirates)

Rank	Nation	Gold	Silver	Bronze	Total
1	Russia	2	2	2	6
2	Poland	1	1	0	2
3	Belarus	1	0	0	1
3	Belgium	1	0	0	1
5	France	0	1	1	2
6	Ireland	0	1	0	1
7	Australia	0	0	1	1
7	Ukraine	0	0	1	1
Totals (8 entries)		5	5	5	15

Results

=== Men's elite ===
Rank	Athlete	Nation	Run 1	T1	Bike	T2	Run 2	Overall time
1st place, gold medalist(s)	Thibaut De Smet	Belgium	21:08	0:34	38:54	1:24	11:29	1:13:29
2nd place, silver medalist(s)	Jan Chrzanowski	Poland	21:47	0:32	39:48	1:07	10:40	1:13:54
3rd place, bronze medalist(s)	Maxim Chané	France	22:06	0:37	38:49	1:18	11:06	1:13:56
4	Sébastien Carabin	Belgium	22:06	0:36	38:40	1:19	11:25	1:14:06
5	Wojciech Kopyciński	Poland	21:48	0:34	39:32	1:12	11:44	1:14:50
6	Alessandro Saravalle	Italy	22:10	0:39	39:45	1:16	11:57	1:15:47
7	Ivan Zalavtsev	Russia	22:19	0:35	40:00	1:14	12:00	1:16:08
8	Mohamed Nemsi	Morocco	21:08	0:36	42:23	1:28	11:05	1:16:40
9	Evgenii Evgrafov	Russia	22:40	0:37	40:05	1:20	12:11	1:16:53
10	Ryno Owen	South Africa	22:38	0:35	43:33	1:15	11:34	1:19:35
11	Dmitrii Kondrashov	Russia	23:21	0:45	42:42	1:13	12:47	1:20:48
12	Elian Olasagasti	France	23:33	0:34	43:06	1:29	12:44	1:21:26
13	Tom Jenkins	Australia	25:38	0:47	42:11	1:17	13:14	1:23:07
14	Ilia Zolotov	Russia	23:25	0:43	46:04	1:10	12:19	1:23:41

=== Women's elite ===
Rank	Athlete	Nation	Run 1	T1	Bike	T2	Run 2	Overall time
1st place, gold medalist(s)	Hanna Maksimava	Belarus	23:25	0:40	47:21	1:16	12:40	1:25:22
2nd place, silver medalist(s)	Svetlana Chizhikova	Russia	23:56	0:42	48:18	1:21	12:42	1:26:59
3rd place, bronze medalist(s)	Sofiya Pryyma	Ukraine	26:04	0:37	48:55	1:18	13:59	1:30:53
4	Ivana Kuriačková	Slovakia	25:08	0:35	51:51	1:20	13:45	1:32:39
5	Vlada Khristoforova	Russia	27:38	0:46	49:20	1:27	15:11	1:34:22
6	Daria Volkova	Russia	28:23	0:37	51:59	1:27	15:48	1:38:14
7	Tory Sigmond	United States	30:14	1:14	52:29	1:52	16:12	1:42:01
8	Amberlie Wellens	Belgium	29:17	0:52	58:22	1:47	16:23	1:46:41

=== Men's under-23 ===
Rank	Athlete	Nation	Run 1	T1	Bike	T2	Run 2	Overall time
1st place, gold medalist(s)	Jan Chrzanowski	Poland	21:47	0:32	39:48	1:07	10:40	1:13:54
2nd place, silver medalist(s)	Elian Olasagasti	France	23:33	0:34	43:06	1:29	12:44	1:21:26
3rd place, bronze medalist(s)	Tom Jenkins	Australia	25:38	0:47	42:11	1:17	13:14	1:23:07
4	Ilia Zolotov	Russia	23:25	0:43	46:04	1:10	12:19	1:23:41

=== Women's under-23 ===
Rank	Athlete	Nation	Run 1	T1	Bike	T2	Run 2	Overall time
1st place, gold medalist(s)	Svetlana Chizhikova	Russia	23:56	0:42	48:18	1:21	12:42	1:26:59
2nd place, silver medalist(s)	Vlada Khristoforova	Russia	27:38	0:46	49:20	1:27	15:11	1:34:22
3rd place, bronze medalist(s)	Daria Volkova	Russia	28:23	0:37	51:59	1:27	15:48	1:38:14
4	Amberlie Wellens	Belgium	29:17	0:52	58:22	1:47	16:23	1:46:41

=== Men's junior ===
Rank	Athlete	Nation	Run 1	T1	Bike	T2	Run 2	Overall time
1st place, gold medalist(s)	Aleksei Trofimenko	Russia	11:45	0:30	21:58	1:11	7:29	42:53
2nd place, silver medalist(s)	Evan Tosh	Ireland	11:31	0:35	23:01	1:10	7:28	43:45
3rd place, bronze medalist(s)	Dmitrii Shamshin	Russia	11:45	0:32	22:19	1:13	08:16	44:05
4	Dmitrii Shchegolev	Russia	12:03	0:40	22:47	1:19	09:01	45:50
5	Matthew Ratcliffe	South Africa	12:39	0:46	23:25	1:14	08:53	46:57
6	Matvei Bochkarev	Russia	12:11	0:42	24:35	1:26	08:40	47:34
7	Bryce Fowler	South Africa	13:05	0:46	24:38	1:32	09:06	49:07
8	Nico De Nysschen	South Africa	14:29	0:56	24:58	1:28	10:03	51:54

== Age group and para cross duathlon ==
The following athletes were champions in heir age-group at the amateur age-group championships, held with the main races.

Open

Classification	Athlete	Time
18-19 Open	Ashton Guitry (NZL)	1:34:01
30-34 Open	Patrick Weitkamp (GER)	1:23:43
35-39 Open	Andrzej Stadnik (USA)	1:23:29
40-44 Open	Juan Diego Haro Martínez (ESP)	1:23:23
45-49 Open	Franck Bonasso (FRA)	1:27:09
50-54 Open	Jonathan Lane (AUS)	1:37:02
55-59 Open	Greg Simcock (GBR)	1:32:54
60-64 Open	Alessandro De Cillia (ITA)	1:34:36
65-69 Open	Janko Železnikar (SLO)	1:41:35
70-74 Open	Gerhard Schlüter (GER)	1:55:12
75-79 Open	Mick Anglim (GBR)	2:13:33
80-84 Open	Alain Moenne-Loccoz (FRA)	2:31:39

Women

Classification	Athlete	Time
30-34 Female	Thomasina Loeffen (NZL)	1:44:04
35-39 Female	Roksana Orzyszek (POL)	2:04:08
40-44 Female	Alicja Sidor (POL)	1:43:22
50-54 Female	Severine Guerif (FRA)	1:40:54
55-59 Female	Nathalie Olasagasti (FRA)	1:38:32
60-64 Female	Sabine Greipel (AUT)	2:07:26
65-69 Female	Silvia Brandstetter (SUI)	2:11:16
70-74 Female	Sheri Schrock (USA)	2:45:12

Para cross duathlon

Classification	Athlete	Time
PTS4 Men	Andrey Tolstikov (RUS)	0:53:57
PTS5 Men	Aleksandr Ialchik (RUS)	0:51:27
