= Étienne Casimir Hippolyte Cordellier-Delanoue =

Étienne Casimir Hippolyte Cordellier-Delanoue (19 September 1806, Grenoble – 14 November 1854, Paris) was a 19th-century French dramatist, novelist and poet.

== Works ==
Theatre

- 1831: Kernox le fou, drama in four acts and in verse, Théâtre de l'Odéon, 17 May
- 1832; Le Barbier de Louis XI, 1439-1483 Read online
- 1834: Marguerite de Montmorency in Le Livre de beauté : souvenirs historiques, preface by Charles Nodier
- 1835: Cromwell et Charles Ier, drama in 5 acts, preceded by Un dernier jour de popularité, prologue in 1 act, Théâtre de la Porte-Saint-Martin, 21 May
- 1839: Isabelle de Montréal, drama in 2 acts, mingled with singing, with Paul Foucher, Paris, Théâtre de la Gaîté, 10 June
- 1841: Mathieu Luc, drama in 5 acts in verse, Paris, Théâtre de l'Odéon, 28 October
- 1847: Le Manchon, comedy in 2 acts in verse, Paris, Théâtre de l'Odéon, 23 March
- 1847: Qui dort dîne, one-act comédie en vaudevilles, with Eugène Roche, Paris, Théâtre des Variétés, 8 July
- 1855: Une Épreuve avant la lettre, comédie en vaudevilles in 1 act, with Jules Barbier, Paris, Théâtre des Variétés, 14 February Read online

Varia

- 1824: La Poésie et la Musique, ou Racine et Mozart, épître à M. Victor S..., play in verse
- 1826: Épître à sir Walter Scott, play in verse
- 1845: Les Javanais, histoire de 1682, novel. Aldo published under the title La Couronne d'or in 1851 and reprinted several times under the title Histoire de 1682 : l'Île de Java between 1875 and 1882.
- 1847: Jacques Cœur, novel Read online
- 1851: René d'Anjou, novel
- 1855: Les Sillons, poésies anciennes et nouvelles
