= Jean-Baptiste-Sauveur Gavaudan =

French opera singer (1772–1840)

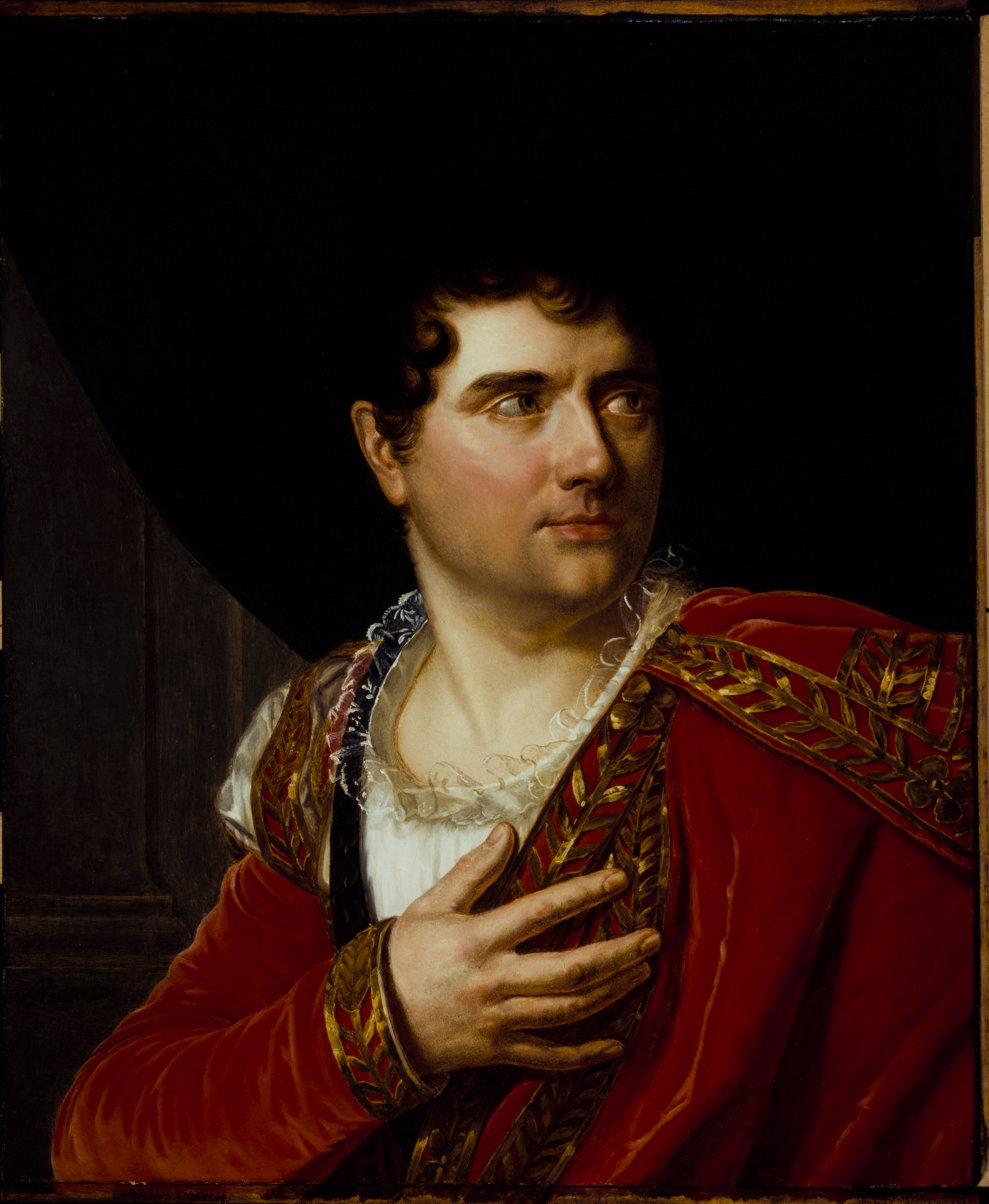
- Born: 8 August 1772; Salon-de-Provence, France
- Died: 10 May 1840 (aged 67); Paris, France
- Occupation: Opera singer (tenor)
- Spouse: Alexandrine Marie Agathe Gavaudan-Ducamel

Jean-Baptiste-Sauveur Gavaudan (8 August 1772 – 10 May 1840) was a French opera singer who sang leading tenor roles, primarily with the Opéra Comique in Paris. He was particularly known for his skill as an actor and was sometimes referred to as "the Talma of the Opéra Comique". He also served as the director of the Théâtre Royal de la Monnaie in Brussels for the 1817–1818 season. Born in Salon-de-Provence, he made his stage debut in 1791 at the Théâtre Montansier. Gavaudan was married to the soprano Alexandrine Marie Agathe Gavaudan-Ducamel from 1798 until his death in Paris at the age of 67.

== Life and career ==
Gavaudan was born in Salon-de-Provence and spent his early childhood in Nimes where his father was the music master at a religious institution. His three sisters were training to be opera singers in Paris where he also began his musical training at the age of five. The oldest two, Anne-Marie-Jeanne, known as "Mlle Gavaudan l'aînée" (the elder), and Adélaïde Gavaudan, known as "Mlle Gavaudan cadette" (the younger), were to become fairly prominent artistes at the Paris Opéra in the period immediately preceding the French Revolution. The youngest sister, Emilie, having failed to make her way in the Opéra's company, had a minor career after the Revolution at the Théâtre Feydeau and the Opéra-Comique. Another elder brother also briefly performed as a dancer at the Paris Opéra around 1779.

Gavaudan was seven when his father died leaving the family in financial difficulty; he had finally just been hired as a choir haute-contre by the Paris Opera, and was closely followed by his two aforementioned older daughters and his dancing son. For his part, in 1779 Jean-Baptiste-Sauveur was engaged as a young midshipman on the French Royal Navy ship Saint-Esprit, part of the fleet commanded by the Comte de Grasse. On his return to Paris in 1783, he resumed his studies and obtained a position in the office of the Paris Opéra.

However, Gavaudan was determined to have a stage career and persuaded Louis-Luc Loiseau de Persuis to give him singing lessons. He made his stage debut at the age of 19 at the Théâtre Montansier. He sang only two performances, but they brought him to the attention of Giovanni Battista Viotti who immediately engaged him for his troupe at the Théâtre Feydeau. There he found particular success as Felix in Gaveaux's L'amour filial and Belfort in Devienne's Les Visitandines. His career was briefly interrupted in the autumn 1793 when he and his fellow tenor Jean Elleviou were drafted into the French Revolutionary Army. However, their friends in the Committee of Public Safety had them recalled to Paris as "essential artists" and in 1794 he rejoined the Opéra Comique moving from the Théâtre Feydeau to the Salle Favart troupe. When the two Opéra Comique troupes combined in 1801, Gavaudan became a Sociétaire of the company and remained there for the next 15 years, creating numerous roles in world premieres.

Political quarrels with the management of the Opéra Comique led to Gavaudan's retirement from the company in 1816. From 1817 to 1818, he served as the director of the Théâtre Royal de la Monnaie in Brussels. He left the post after a year when the city's climate worsened a chest condition. For several more years he sang in French provincial cities. He returned to the Opéra Comique in 1822 to sing in his wife's farewell performance and again in 1824 when the management engaged him to reprise some of his most well-known roles, although according to Fétis, by that time, his voice was only a shadow of what it once been. He retired from the stage definitively at the beginning of 1828.

In 1798, Gavaudan had married the soprano Alexandrine Marie Agathe Gavaudan-Ducamel shortly before her own debut at the Opéra Comique. During her career there she appeared in several operas with him and also sang as a guest performer at the Théâtre Royal de la Monnaie when he was the director of that opera house. The couple had two children. Their son, Constant-Edouard Gavaudan, was an officer in a French infantry regiment, stationed in North Africa. He was killed near Blida in 1838. Their daughter, Marie Agathe Gavaudan who performed under the name Madame Raimbaux, was an opera singer of some note who studied under Manuel García. She appeared at the Teatro San Carlo in Naples and with the Théâtre-Italien company in Paris where she specialised in Rossinian roles. She retired from the stage in 1836.

Jean-Baptiste-Sauveur Gavaudan died in Paris in 1840 at the age of 67.
