= Marina Muñoz =

Spanish triathlete (born 1999)

Personal information
- Nationality: Spanish
- Born: 25 May 1999 (age 27) Cuéllar, Spain

Sport
- Country: Spain
Medal record
Representing Spain
Women's triathlon
World Triathlon Cross Championships
Gold medal – first place	2026 Abu Dhabi	Elite
Silver medal – second place	2025 Pontevedra	Elite
European Triathlon Cross Championships
Gold medal – first place	2024 Coimbra	Elite
Gold medal – first place	2026 Bañolas	Elite
World Triathlon Aquathlon Championships
Silver medal – second place	2025 Pontevedra	Elite
European Triathlon Aquathlon Championships
Bronze medal – third place	2026 Bañolas	Elite

Marina Muñoz Hernando (born 25 May 1999) is a Spanish triathlete and duathlete who has competed in cross triathlon, aquathlon, and long-distance triathlon. In cross triathlon, she is a two-time European champion and a two-time medalist at the world championships, winning one of them. She also competes in aquathlon, where she has won a medal at both the world and European championships.

== Career ==
In March 2020, Muñoz finished on the podium for the first time when she finished in third place at the ETU Duathlon European Championships in Punta Umbria.

In June 2024, Muñoz won the European Triathlon Cross Championships in Coimbra, Portugal. In June 2025, she won the silver medal at the World Triathlon Cross Triathlon Championships as well as the World Triathlon Aquathlon Championships, both held in Pontevedra.

In July 2026, Muñoz won the European Triathlon Cross Championships and also won the bronze medal at the European Triathlon Aquathlon Championships, both held in Bañolas. In November 2026, she won the World Triathlon Cross Championships held in Abu Dhabi.
