= Pavel Andreev =

Pavel Andreev may refer to:

- Pavel Andreev (decathlete)
- Pavel Andreev (handballer)
- Pavel Andreyev (runner)
