= Manuel García (tenor) =

Spanish tenor (1775–1832)

Manuel Garcia
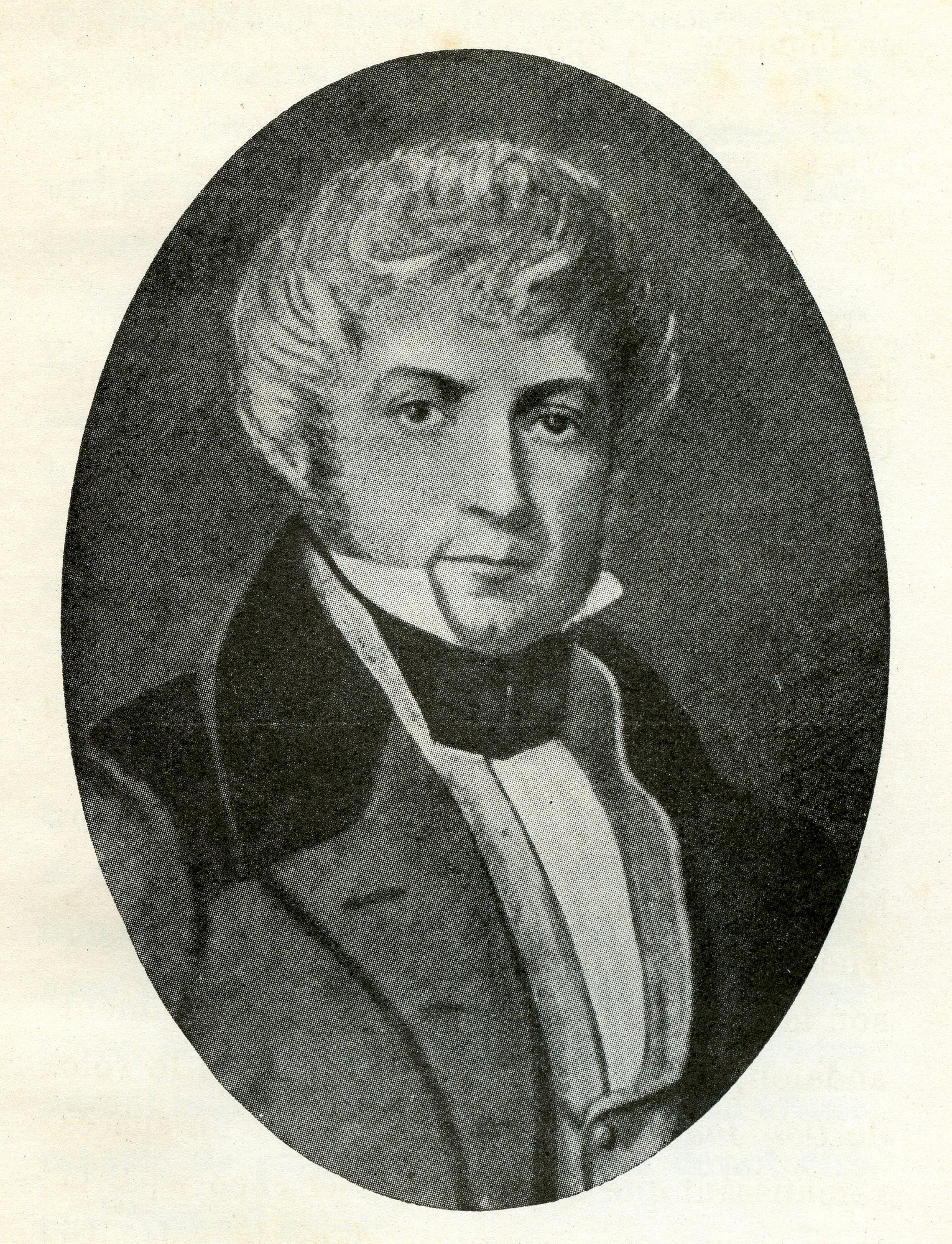
- Born: Manuel del Pópulo Vicente Rodíguez; January 21, 1775; Seville, Spain
- Died: July 10, 1832 (aged 57); Paris, France
- Resting place: Père Lachaise Cemetery

Manuel del Pópulo Vicente Rodriguez García (also known as Manuel García the Senior; 21 January 1775 – 10 June 1832) was a Spanish opera singer, composer, impresario, and singing teacher. He is often credited as a key figure in the development of modern vocal technique and vocal pedagogy.

== Biography ==
García was born in Seville, Spain, on 21 January 1775. In 1808, he went to Paris, with previous experience as a tenor at Madrid and Cádiz. By that year, when he appeared in the opera Griselda in Paris, he was already a composer of light operas. He lived in Naples, performing in Gioachino Rossini's operas. These included the premières of Elisabetta, regina d'Inghilterra, in which he portrayed the Duke of Norfolk and The Barber of Seville, in which he portrayed the role of Count Almaviva. In 1816, he visited Paris and London. Between 1819 and 1823, he lived in Paris, and sang in operas such as The Barber of Seville, Otello, and Don Giovanni, often appearing at London's King's Theatre too. In the same period he presented new French-style operas of his own composition at the Paris Opera, the Opéra-Comique and the Gymnase-Dramatique.

His elder daughter was the celebrated singer Maria Malibran, and his second daughter was Pauline Viardot, a musician of consequence and, as a singer, one of "the most brilliant dramatic stars" of her time. His son, Manuel Patricio Rodríguez García, after being a second-rate baritone, became a world-famous vocal pedagogue, "the leading theoretical writer of Rossini vocal school".

In 1825, he and his company, four of eight of them Garcías, were recruited by a New York vintner, Dominick Lynch Jr. (1786–1857), who had been encouraged by Italian opera librettist Lorenzo Da Ponte, then a professor of Italian at Columbia College, to introduce New Yorkers to Italian opera. They staged the first performances (a total of about 80) of Italian opera in New York. The García family took all the main parts in performances of The Barber of Seville, with García as Almaviva, his second wife Joaquina Sitchez (also called "la Briones") as Berta, Manuel Jr. as Figaro, and Maria as Rosina; Pauline was still very young at this time. Da Ponte particularly insisted on the company billing Don Giovanni, of whose libretto he was the author, and Mozart's opera was given its first American unabridged performance on 23 May 1826 in the presence of its librettist, with García singing the title role, la Briones as Donna Elvira, Maria as Zerlina, and Manuel Jr. as Leporello.

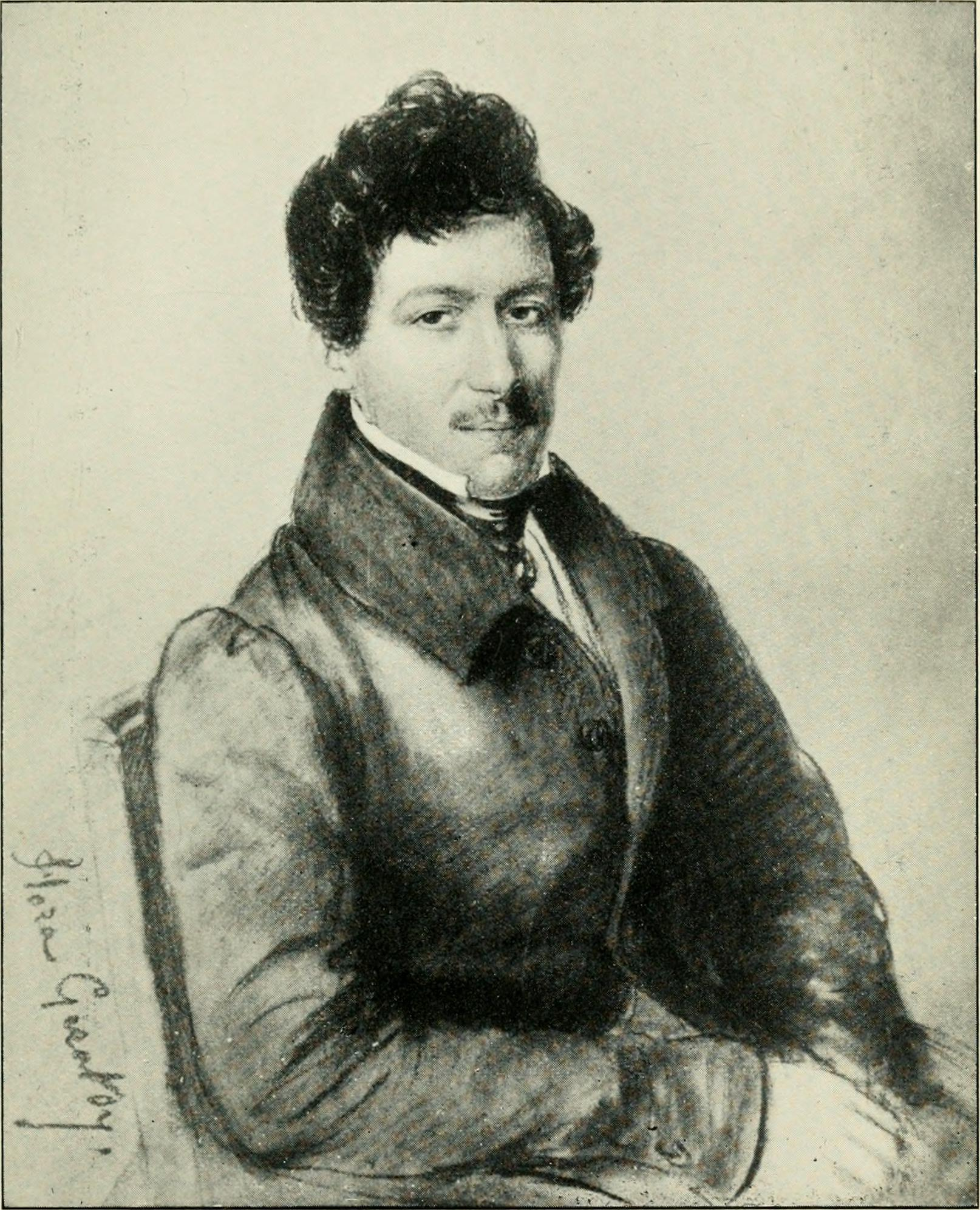
Manuel García

They also performed in Mexico, and García recounted in his memoirs that while on the road between Mexico and Vera Cruz, he was robbed of all his money by brigands.

García had planned to settle in Mexico, but following political troubles, in 1829 he had to return to Paris, where he was once again very warmly welcome by the public. His voice, however, was being impaired by age as well as fatigue, and, never ceasing to compose, "he soon dedicated himself to teaching, for which he seems to have been specially gifted". After having his last appearance on stage in August 1831, he died on 10 June the following year and was buried in Père Lachaise Cemetery. His funeral oration was delivered by François-Joseph Fétis, who "honoured him above all as a composer, remarking that his best works remained unpublished – as is still true today". In 1836, Franz Liszt wrote a Rondeau fantastique sur un thème espagnol, S, 252, for piano, based on García's song "El contrabandista".

According to James Radomski, "García's dynamic perfectionism left its impact on three continents and his legacy, in the hands of his children, was carried into the 20th century".

== Artistic features ==
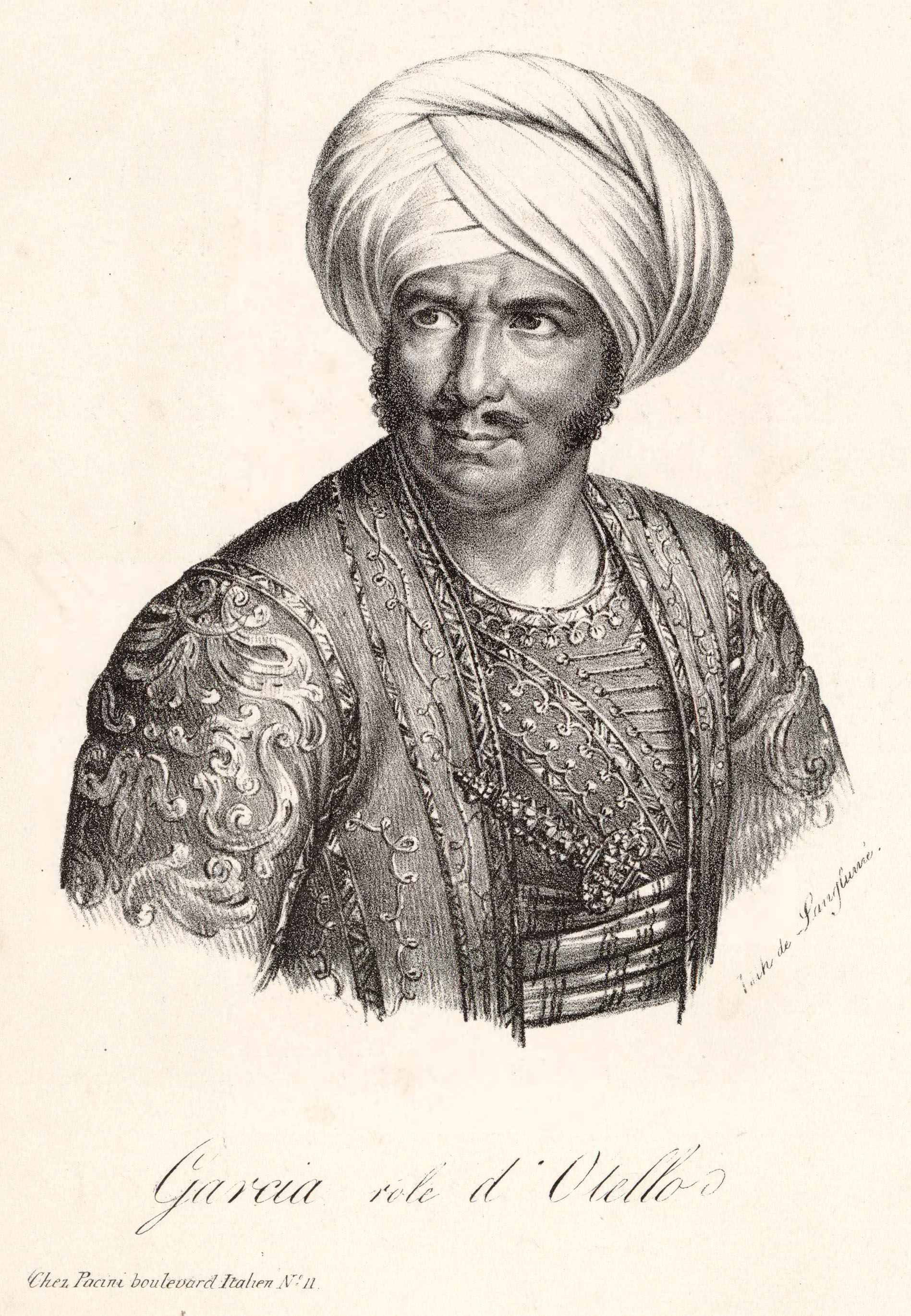
García in the title role in Rossini's Otello

Despite his Spanish origins, Manuel García became a paragon of the Italian-style tenor of the early 19th century. According to John Potter, it was mainly after coming to Italy in 1812 and meeting "the highly respected tenor and teacher Giovanni Ansani that he acquired the skills that would enable him to cope with Rossini. Ansani taught him how to project, and perhaps how to achieve the heavier sound that Mozart had recognized in all Italian singers as long ago as 1770, and presumably gave him the pedagogical rigour that would enable him to teach so authoritatively". In fact, his "voice was, according to Fétis, a deep tenor": indeed, his singing had baritonal characteristics and has been presently referred to as baritenore, mainly in Italy. García possessed, however, an unusual vocal compass: although he was also able to cope with real baritone roles, the parts written for him by Rossini generally tend to be higher than those written for other baritonal tenors like Andrea Nozzari or Domenico Donzelli, and, according to Paolo Scudo's testimony, it was García, and not Gilbert-Louis Duprez, the first singer able to utter the "C from the chest". Given his artistic background, however, García is not reported to have ever sung it in public.

Despite his range, he cannot be regarded as a tenore contraltino. He had, for instance, in his repertoire the role of Lindoro in L'italiana in Algeri, but, when he had to confront "the extremely high tessitura and the mainly syllabic writing of [his entrance aria] "Languir per una bella", he transposed the aria down a minor third, performing it in C major instead of E-flat". García was also able to master falsetto vocal phonation to such a point that, in a tonadilla of his, El poeta calculista, he could perform a duet with himself, where he sang both the tenor and the soprano parts.

Garcia was known as an extravagant, even violent, personality.

== Salon operas ==
In his final years, García wrote five salon operas to showcase the talents of his students. In 2006 and 2015, the critical editions of two of these operas, L'isola disabitata and Un avvertimento ai gelosi, edited by Teresa Radomski, were published by A-R Editions. L'sola disabitata received its modern premiere at Wake Forest University in 2005, followed by its first European staging in Spain in 2010. Un avvertimento ai gelosi was performed in Spain in 2016. The North American premiere of Un avvertimento ai gelosi took place at Memorial University of Newfoundland in 2016. A subsequent performance took place at the Caramoor Summer Music Festival in 2017, with Bel Canto Young Artists in the principal roles. The cast featured Shirin Eskandani (Sandrina), Kyle Oliver (Berto), Joshua Sanders (the Count), Rob McGinness (Don Fabio), Madison Marie McIntosh (Ernesta), and Sean Christensen (Menico), with music director Timothy Cheung at the piano. This performance also was conducted based on the critical edition edited by Teresa Radomski.

== Roles created and significant performances ==
The following is a selected list (mainly drawn from the L'Almanacco di Gherardo Casaglia) which intends to note significant moments in Manuel García's career after his arrival in Italy. The symbol (*) indicates premieres, while the symbol (**) marks other notable performances, especially involving premieres in towns and theatres.

Role	Opera	Genre	Composer	Theatre	Performance date
Achille	Ifigenia in Aulide	tragedia-opera (2nd version) [performed in Italian]	Christoph Willibald Gluck	Naples, Real Teatro San Carlo	15 August 1812 (**)
Achille	Ecuba	tragedia per musica	Nicola Antonio Manfroce	Naples, Real Teatro San Carlo	13 December 1812 (*)
Oitone	Gaulo ed Oitone	melodramma serio	Pietro Generali	Naples, Real Teatro San Carlo	9 March 1813 (*)
Califfo Isaun	Il califfo di Bagdad	opera comica	Manuel García	Naples, Real Teatro San Carlo	8 November 1813 (*)
Egeo	Medea in Corinto	melodramma tragico (1st version)	Simon Mayr	Naples, Real Teatro San Carlo	28 November 1813 (*)
Endimione	Diana ed Endimione	cantata	Manuel García	Naples, Real Teatro San Carlo	9 February 1814 (*)
Almaviva	Le nozze di Figaro	opera buffa	Wolfgang Amadeus Mozart	Naples, Teatro del Fondo della Separazione	March 1814 (**)
Alceo	Partenope	festa teatrale	Giuseppe Farinelli	Naples, Real Teatro San Carlo	15 August 1814 (*)
Don Rodrigo	Donna Caritea, regina di Spagna	dramma serio per musica	Giuseppe Farinelli	Naples, Real Teatro San Carlo	16 September 1814 (*)
Dallaton	Tella e Dallaton, o sia La donzella di Raab	opera seria	Manuel García	Naples, Real Teatro San Carlo	4 November 1814 (*)
Ermindo	La gelosia corretta	commedia per musica	Michele Carafa	Naples, Teatro dei Fiorentini di Napoli	carnival 1815 (*)
Enrico V	La gioventù di Enrico Quinto	opera	Ferdinand Hérold	Naples, Teatro del Fondo della Separazione	5 January 1815 (*)
Ataliba	Cora	opera seria	Simon Mayr	Real Teatro San Carlo di Napoli	27 Marzo 1815 (*)
Norfolk	Elisabetta, regina d'Inghilterra	dramma per musica	Gioachino Rossini	Naples, Real Teatro San Carlo	4 October 1815 (*)
Almaviva	Almaviva ossia L'inutile precauzione (Il barbiere di Siviglia)	dramma comico	Gioachino Rossini	Rome, Teatro della Torre Argentina	20 February 1816 (*)
Lindoro	L'italiana in Algeri	melodramma buffo	Gioachino Rossini	Paris, Salle Louvois du Théâtre-Italien	1 February 1817 (**)
Torvaldo	Torvaldo e Dorliska	dramma lirico semiserio	Gioachino Rossini	Paris, Salle Louvois du Théâtre-Italien	21 November 1820 (**)
Giocondo	La pietra del paragone	melodramma giocoso (revision)	Gioachino Rossini	Paris, Salle Louvois du Théâtre-Italien	5 April 1821 (**)
Otello	Otello	dramma tragico per musica (1st version)	Gioachino Rossini	Paris, Salle Louvois du Théâtre-Italien	5 June 1821 (**)
Norfolk	Elisabetta regina d'Inghilterra	dramma per musica	Gioachino Rossini	Paris, Salle Louvois du Théâtre-Italien	10 March 1822 (**)
Florestan	Florestan ou Le conseil des dix	opéra	Manuel García	Paris, Théâtre de l'Académie Royale de Musique	26 June 1822 (*)
Osiride	Mosè in Egitto	azione tragico-sacra (3rd version)	Gioachino Rossini	Paris, Salle Louvois du Théâtre-Italien	20 October 1822 (**)
Ilo	Zelmira	dramma serio per musica (2nd version)	Gioachino Rossini	London, King's Theatre in the Haymarket	24 January 1824 (**)
Agorante	Ricciardo e Zoraide	dramma per musica (1st version)	Gioachino Rossini	London, King's Theatre in the Haymarket	24 March 1824 (**)
Idreno	Semiramide	melodramma tragico	Gioachino Rossini	London, King's Theatre in the Haymarket	15 July 1824 (**)
Almaviva	Il barbiere di Siviglia	dramma giocoso	Gioachino Rossini	New York, Park Theatre	29 November 1825 (**)
Otello	Otello	dramma tragico per musica (1st version)	Gioachino Rossini	New York, Park Theatre	7 February 1826 (**)
Narciso	Il turco in Italia	dramma buffo per musica (opera buffa, 2nd version)	Gioachino Rossini	New York, Park Theatre	14 March 1826 (**)
Don Giovanni	Don Giovanni	opera buffa	Wolfgang Amadeus Mozart	New York, Park Theatre	23 May 1826 (**)
Ramiro	La Cenerentola	melodramma giocoso	Gioachino Rossini	New York, Park Theatre	27 June 1827 (**)

== Selected works ==
The following lists are drawn from The New Grove Dictionary of Opera (article: "García, Manuel", by James Radomski), with possible details from different sources.

Performed

- La maja y el majo (tonadilla, Madrid, 1798)
- La declaración (tonadilla, Madrid, 1799)
- El seductor arrepentido (opereta, Madrid, 1802)
- Quien porfía mucho alcanza (opereta, Madrid, 1802)
- El luto fingido (opereta, Madrid, 1803)
- El criado fingido (opereta, Madrid, 1804)
- El padrastro, o Quien a yerro mata a yerro muere (Madrid, 1804)
- El poeta calculista (monologue, Madrid, 1805)
- El cautiverio aparente (opereta, Madrid, 1805)
- El preso (monologue, Madrid, 1806)
- Los lacónicos, o La trampa descubierta (opereta, Madrid, 1806)
- Los ripios del maestro Adán (opereta, Madrid, 1807)
- Il califfo di Bagdad (opera buffa, Naples, 1813)
- Talla e Dallaton, o sia La donzella di Raab (opera seria, Naples, 1814)
- Le prince d'occasion (opéra-comique, Paris, 1817)
- Il fazzoletto (opera buffa, Paris, 1820)
- La mort du Tasse (tragédie lyrique, Paris, 1821)
- La meunière (opera comica, Paris, 1821)
- Florestan, ou Le conseil des dix (opéra, Paris, 1822)
- Les deux contrats de mariage (opera buffa, Paris, 1824)
- Astuzie e prudenza (London, 1825)
- L'amante astuto (comic opera in two acts, New York, 1825)
- Il lupo d'Ostenda, o sia L'innocente salvato dal colpevole (New York, 1825)
- La figlia del aria (semi-tragic opera in two acts, New York, 1826)
- La buona famiglia (New York, 1826)
- El Abufar, ossia La famiglia araba (Mexico City, 1827)
- Un'ora di matrimonio (opera buffa, Mexico City, 1827)
- Zemira ed Azor (Mexico City, 1827)
- Acendi (Mexico City, 1828)
- El gitano por amor (Mexico City, 1828)
- Los maritos solteros (Mexico City, 1828)
- Semiramis (Mexico City, 1828)
- Xaira (Mexico City, 1828)

Unperformed (or privately performed)

- Un avvertimento ai gelosi
- Le cinesi
- Il finto sordo
- L'isola disabitata
- I tre gobbi
- I banditi, o sia La foresta pericolosa
- Don Chisciotte (opera buffa in two acts)
- La gioventù d'Enrico V
- L'origine des graces
- Le tre sultane
- El Zapatero de Bagdad

== Genealogy ==
- Manuel García (1775–1832), singer, composer, impresario; married Joaquina Sitches (1780–1864)
  - Manuel García Junior (1805–1906), singer, composer, singing teacher; married Cécile Maria "Eugénie" Mayer (1814–1880)
    - Manuel García (1836–1885)
    - Gustave García (1837–1925), baritone and singing teacher; married Emily Matilda Ann Martorell (1835–?)
      - Alberto García (1875–1946), baritone
    - Eugenie Harouel (1840–1924)
    - Marie Crèpet (1842–1867)
  - Maria Malibran (1808–1836), singer; married Francois Eugene Malibran (1781–1836) (no issue); married Charles Auguste de Bériot (1802–1870), composer, violinist
    - Charles-Wilfrid de Bériot (1833–1914), pianist, composer, professor at the École Niedermeyer
  - Pauline Viardot (1821–1910), singer, composer; married Louis Viardot (1800–1883)
    - Louise Héritte-Viardot (1841–1918), composer, pianist, singer
    - Claudie Viardot (1852–1914); married Georges Chamerot; had issue
    - Marianne Viardot (1854–1919), painter, briefly engaged to Gabriel Fauré; married Alphonse Duvernoy
    - Paul Viardot (1857–1941)

== See also ==
- Agathe Alexandrine Gavaudan
