= 2024 European Road Championships – Women's road race =

Women's elite road race
2024 European Road Championships
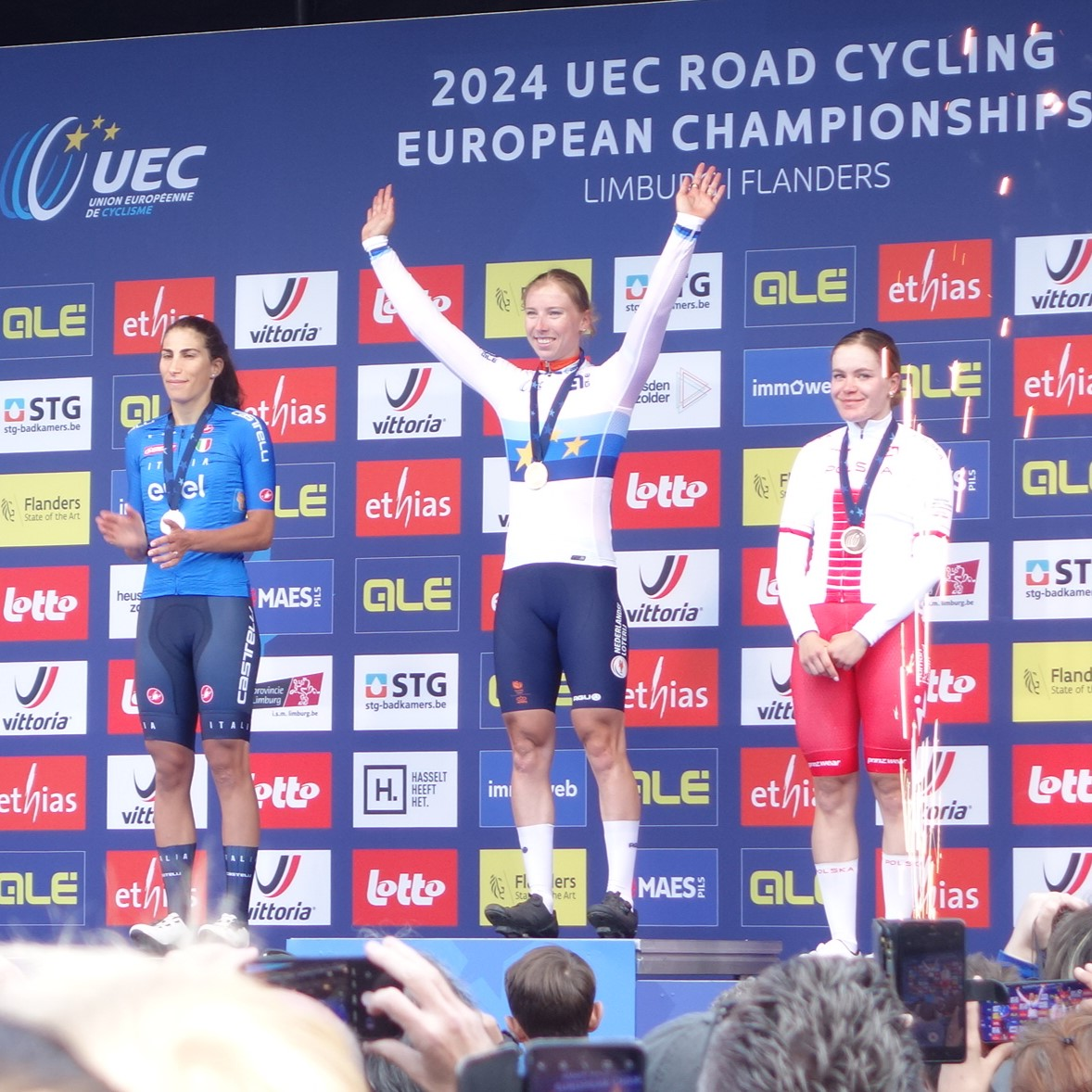

Race details
- Dates: 14 September
- Stages: 1
- Distance: 162.0 km (100.7 mi)
- Winning time: 3:56:34

Medalists
	Gold	Lorena Wiebes (NED)
	Silver	Elisa Balsamo (ITA)
	Bronze	Daria Pikulik (POL)

The women's elite road race at the 2024 European Road Championships took place on 14 September 2024, in Limburg, Belgium.

== Results ==
Rank	#	Cyclist	Nation	Time	Diff.
1st place, gold medalist(s)	8	Lorena Wiebes	Netherlands	3:56:34	
2nd place, silver medalist(s)	9	Elisa Balsamo	Italy	s.t.	
3rd place, bronze medalist(s)	37	Daria Pikulik	Poland	s.t.	
4	27	Clara Copponi	France	s.t.	
5	69	Ingvild Gåskjenn	Norway	s.t.	
6	54	Kathrin Schweinberger	Austria	s.t.	
7	61	Emma Norsgaard	Denmark	s.t.	
8	76	Blanka Vas	Hungary	s.t.	
9	91	Rasa Leleivytė	Lithuania	s.t.	
10	73	Christine Majerus	Luxembourg	s.t.	
11	45	Noemi Rüegg	Switzerland	s.t.	
12	86	Emilia Fahlin	Sweden	s.t.	
13	57	Franziska Koch	Germany	s.t.	
14	21	Marthe Truyen	Belgium	s.t.	
15	34	Karolina Kumięga	Poland	s.t.	
16	46	Sandra Alonso	Spain	s.t.	
17	71	Lotta Henttala	Finland	s.t.	
18	88	Jelena Erić	Serbia	s.t.	
19	92	Anastasia Carbonari	Latvia	s.t.	
20	74	Eugenia Bujak	Slovenia	s.t.	
21	84	Caroline Andersson	Sweden	s.t.	
22	13	Chiara Consonni	Italy	s.t.	
23	94	Argiro Milaki	Greece	s.t.	
24	22	Fien van Eynde	Belgium	s.t.	
25	82	Olga Shekel	Ukraine	s.t.	
26	63	Rebecca Koerner	Denmark	s.t.	
27	18	Audrey de Keersmaeker	Belgium	s.t.	
28	23	Jesse Vandenbulcke	Belgium	s.t.	
29	24	Margot Vanpachtenbeke	Belgium	s.t.	
30	85	Julia Borgström	Sweden	s.t.	
31	10	Rachele Barbieri	Italy	s.t.	
32	35	Marta Lach	Poland	s.t.	
33	72	Nina Berton	Luxembourg	s.t.	
34	52	Usoa Ostolaza	Spain	s.t.	
35	56	Romy Kasper	Germany	s.t.	
36	58	Liane Lippert	Germany	s.t.	
37	75	Urša Pintar	Slovenia	s.t.	
38	25	Victoire Berteau	France	s.t.	
39	36	Aurela Nerlo	Poland	s.t.	
40	81	Yuliia Biriukova	Ukraine	s.t.	
41	6	Karlijn Swinkels	Netherlands	s.t.	
42	43	Lea Fuchs	Switzerland	3:56:42	00:08
43	5	Riejanne Markus	Netherlands	s.t.	
44	87	Mika Söderström	Sweden	s.t.	
45	1	Mischa Bredewold	Netherlands	s.t.	
46	60	Lea Lin Teutenberg	Germany	s.t.	
47	67	Susanne Andersen	Norway	s.t.	
48	68	Marte Berg Edseth	Norway	s.t.	
49	51	Sara Martín	Spain	s.t.	
50	42	Elise Chabbey	Switzerland	s.t.	
51	47	Mireia Benito	Spain	s.t.	
52	44	Elena Hartmann	Switzerland	s.t.	
53	30	Gladys Verhulst	France	3:56:45	00:11
54	17	Alana Castrique	Belgium	s.t.	
55	31	Margaux Vigie	France	s.t.	
56	19	Valerie Demey	Belgium	s.t.	
57	7	Ellen van Dijk	Netherlands	s.t.	
58	4	Amber Kraak	Netherlands	s.t.	
59	29	Marie Le Net	France	s.t.	
60	32	Jade Wiel	France	s.t.	
61	11	Elena Cecchini	Italy	s.t.	
62	14	Barbara Guarischi	Italy	s.t.	
63	65	Cecilie Uttrup Ludwig	Denmark	s.t.	
64	26	Marion Borras	France	s.t.	
65	3	Thalita de Jong	Netherlands	3:56:50	00:16
66	28	Audrey Cordon-Ragot	France	3:56:52	00:18
67	16	Gaia Masetti	Italy	s.t.	
68	12	Maria Giulia Confalonieri	Italy	3:57:00	00:26
69	53	Christina Schweinberger	Austria	3:57:05	00:31
70	40	Agnieszka Skalniak-Sójka	Poland	3:57:11	00:37
71	33	Marta Jaskulska	Poland	s.t.	
72	15	Vittoria Guazzini	Italy	3:57:25	00:51
73	2	Loes Adegeest	Netherlands	s.t.	
74	20	Marion Norbert-Riberolle	Belgium	3:57:33	00:59
DNF	38	Wiktoria Pikulik	Poland		
DNF	39	Kaja Rysz	Poland		
DNF	41	Caroline Baur	Switzerland		
DNF	49	Ariana Gilabert	Spain		
DNF	50	Sheyla Gutiérrez	Spain		
DNF	55	Franziska Brauße	Germany		
DNF	59	Hannah Ludwig	Germany		
DNF	62	Ellen Hjøllund Klinge	Denmark		
DNF	64	Christina Lorenzen	Denmark		
DNF	66	Julie Maribo	Denmark		
DNF	70	Katrine Aalerud	Norway		
DNF	77	Jarmila Machačová	Czechia		
DNF	78	Nikola Nosková	Czechia		
DNF	79	Dimitra Koukouma	Cyprus		
DNF	80	Maryna Altukhova	Ukraine		
DNF	83	Tetiana Yashchenko	Ukraine		
DNF	89	Olivija Baleišytė	Lithuania		
DNF	90	Akvilė Gedraitytė	Lithuania		
DNF	93	Kristel Soonik	Estonia		
DNF	95	Rotem Gafinovitz	Israel		
DNF	96	Bríet Kristý Gunnarsdóttir	Iceland		
DNF	97	Silja Jóhannesdóttir	Iceland		
DNF	98	Hafdís Sigurðardóttir	Iceland		
DNF	99	Valentinova Minkova	Bulgaria		
DNF	100	Neyran Neriman Elden Kosker	Turkey		
