= 2026 UCI Road World Championships – Women's road race =

Cycling event

Women's road race
2026 UCI Road World Championships

Race details
- Dates: 26 September 2026
- Distance: 180.1 km (111.9 mi)
- Winning time: 4:45:09

Medalists
	Gold	(Netherlands) Demi Vollering (NED)
	Silver	(Poland) Katarzyna Niewiadoma-Phinney (POL)
	Bronze	(Italy) Elisa Longo Borghini (ITA)

The Women's road race of the 2026 UCI Road World Championships was a cycling event that took place on 26 September 2026 in Montreal, Canada. It was the 33rd edition of the championship, for which Magdeleine Vallieres of Canada was the defending champion, having won in 2025.

The race was won by Dutch rider Demi Vollering, beating Polish rider Katarzyna Niewiadoma-Phinney in a sprint finish. Italian rider Elisa Longo Borghini finished third. Vollering became the second woman to achieve a Triple Crown of Cycling, having won the Giro d'Italia Women and Tour de France Femmes earlier in the season. The 180.1 kilometres (111.9 mi) long course was the longest ever tackled by elite women at the UCI Road World Championships.

== Course ==
The race covered 180.1 kilometres (111.9 mi) with 2,570 metres (8,430 ft) of total elevation gain. Starting at Quartier DIX30 in Brossard, the course passed through the Montérégie region before crossing the Samuel De Champlain Bridge to reach the finishing circuit in downtown Montréal.

The circuit was 13.4 kilometres (8.3 mi) in length around Mount Royal, with 269 metres (883 ft) of elevation gain per lap. The circuit included the Voie Camillien-Houde climb (2.3 kilometres (1.4 mi) at 6.2% average gradient), the Chemin de la Polytechnique with sections exceeding 11% gradient, and a false flat rising along Avenue du Parc, which served as the finish line. The circuit would be tackled 8 times. The circuit was similar to that used by the Grand Prix Cycliste de Montréal, as well as previous cycling events in Montréal such as the 1974 UCI Road World Championships and 1976 Summer Olympics.

== Final classification ==
Rank	Rider	Country	Time
1st place, gold medalist(s)	Demi Vollering	Netherlands	4:45:09
2nd place, silver medalist(s)	Katarzyna Niewiadoma-Phinney	Poland	+ 0"
3rd place, bronze medalist(s)	Elisa Longo Borghini	Italy	+ 4"
4	Marlen Reusser	Switzerland	+ 8"
5	Juliette Berthet	France	+ 39"
6	Puck Pieterse	Netherlands	+ 1' 36"
7	Célia Gery	France	+ 2' 55"
8	Dominika Wlodarczyk	Poland	+ 4' 16"
9	Maeva Squiban	France	+ 5' 48"
10	Franziska Koch	Germany	+ 5' 51"
11	Pfeiffer Georgi	Great Britain	+ 8' 34"
12	Eleonora Gasparrini	Italy	+ 8' 34"
13	Steffi Haberlin	Switzerland	+ 8' 34"
14	Liane Lippert	Germany	+ 8' 34"
15	Noemi Ruegg	Switzerland	+ 8' 34"
16	Henrietta Christie	New Zealand	+ 8' 34"
17	Sarah van Dam	Canada	+ 8' 34"
18	Lauren Dickson	Great Britain	+ 8' 34"
19	Ashleigh Moolman	South Africa	+ 8' 34"
20	Lotte Kopecky	Belgium	+ 8' 34"
21	Kristen Faulkner	United States	+ 8' 34"
22	Sara Casasola	Italy	+ 8' 34"
23	Paula Patino	Colombia	+ 8' 34"
24	Shari Bossuyt	Belgium	+ 8' 34"
25	Monica Trinca Colonel	Italy	+ 8' 34"
26	Mavi García	Spain	+ 8' 40"
27	Margot Vanpachtenbeke	Belgium	+ 8' 40"
28	Antonia Niedermaier	Germany	+ 8' 40"
29	Karlijn Swinkels	Netherlands	+ 8' 40"
30	Silvia Persico	Italy	+ 8' 48"
31	Mireia Benito	Spain	+ 8' 48"
32	Cédrine Kerbaol	France	+ 8' 48"
33	Ginia-Lara Caluori	Switzerland	+ 8' 51"
34	Zoe Bäckstedt	Great Britain	+ 9' 03"
35	Francesca Barale	Italy	+ 12' 38"
36	Nina Berton	Luxembourg	+ 14' 21"
37	Ana Vitória Magalhães	Brazil	+ 14' 21"
38	Riejanne Markus	Netherlands	+ 14' 21"
39	Amanda Spratt	Australia	+ 14' 21"
40	Lauren Stephens	United States	+ 15' 31"
41	Nadia Gontova	Canada	+ 15' 33"
42	Sarah Gigante	Australia	+ 15' 33"
43	Marte Berg Edseth	Norway	+ 15' 33"
44	Lieke Nooijen	Netherlands	+ 15' 33"
45	Kimberley Le Court	Mauritius	+ 15' 33"
46	Anna Henderson	Great Britain	+ 15' 33"
47	Katharina Sadnik	Austria	+ 15' 33"
48	Femke de Vries	Netherlands	+ 15' 33"
49	Évita Muzic	France	+ 15' 33"

Rank	Rider	Country	Time
	Solbjork Anderson	Denmark	DNF
	Olha Kulynych	Ukraine	DNF
	Linda Riedmann	Germany	DNF
	Marta Lach	Poland	DNF
	Nika Bobnar	Slovenia	DNF
	Tiril Jørgensen	Norway	DNF
	Sandrine Tas	Belgium	DNF
	Léa Curinier	France	DNF
	Marie Le Net	France	DNF
	Josie Nelson	Great Britain	DNF
	Usoa Ostolaza	Spain	DNF
	Natalie Quinn	United States	DNF
	Erica Magnaldi	Italy	DNF
	Kate Courtney	United States	DNF
	Grace Arlandson	United States	DNF
	Lotte Claes	Belgium	DNF
	Janika Lõiv	Estonia	DNF
	Alison Jackson	Canada	DNF
	Ricarda Bauernfeind	Germany	DNF
	Petra Zsankó	Hungary	DNF
	Olivia Baril	Canada	DNF
	Teniel Campbell	Trinidad and Tobago	DNF
	Hayley Preen	South Africa	DNF
	Raquel Queiros	Portugal	DNF
	Julie van de Velde	Belgium	DNF
	Linda Zanetti	Switzerland	DNF
	Jasmin Liechti	Switzerland	DNF
	Andrea Ramírez	Mexico	DNF
	Amber Kraak	Netherlands	DNF
	Laura Rojas	Colombia	DNF
	Catalina Soto	Chile	DNF
	Jasmin Soto	Chile	DNF
	Carina Schrempf	Austria	DNF
	Niamh Fisher-Black	New Zealand	DNF
	Cecilie Ludwig	Denmark	DNF
	Romina Hinojosa	Mexico	DNF
	Claudette Nyirarukundo	Rwanda	DNF
	Magdeleine Vallieres	Canada	DNF
	Adèle Normand	Canada	DNF
	Argyro Milaki	Greece	DNF
	Lisa Bone	South Africa	DNF
	Agua Marina Espínola	Paraguay	DNF
	Daniela Campos	Portugal	DNF
	Ann-Christine Allik	Estonia	DNF
	Sigrid Ytterhus Haugset	Norway	DNF
	Alexis Magner	United States	DNF
	Sara Martín	Spain	DNF
	Maggie Coles-Lyster	Canada	DNF
	Diana Peñuela	Colombia	DNF
	Xaveline Nirere	Rwanda	DNF
	Zhu Shimeng	China	DNF
	Antri Christoforou	Cyprus	DNF
	Beatriz Roxo	Portugal	DNF
	Vera Looser	Namibia	DNF
	Monaliza Chneslasie	Eritrea	DNF
	Ursula Lindén	Finland	DNF
	Karin Abe	Japan	DNF
	Faina Potapova	Kazakhstan	DNF
	Valeriia Kononenko	Ukraine	DNF
	Mary Joyce Monton	Philippines	DNF
	Skye Davidson	Zimbabwe	DNF
	Julia Borgström	Sweden	DNF
	Paula Blasi	Spain	DNF
	Aidi Gerde Tuisk	Estonia	DNF
	Gergana Stoyanova	Bulgaria	DNF
	Kristina Novikova	{{}}	DNF
	Diane Ingabire	Rwanda	DNF
	Feng Zhaoqi	China	DNF
	Firotika Magh Marenda	Indonesia	DNF
	Rotem Gafinovitz	Israel	DNF
	Madina Kakhkhorova	Uzbekistan	DNF
	Wendy Ducreux	Panama	DNF
	Christina Schweinberger	Austria	DNF
	Chanpeng Nontasin	Thailand	DNF
	Mashael Alhazmi	Saudi Arabia	DNF
	Kaja Rysz	Poland	DNF
	Flora Perkins	Great Britain	DNF
	Marta Jaskulska	Poland	DNF
	Lauretta Hanson	Australia	DNF
	Caroline Andersson	Sweden	DNF
	Tang Xin	China	DNF
	Georgia Baker	Australia	DNF
	Nesrine Houili	Algeria	DNF
	Kendra Tabu	Kenya	DNF
	Tereza Kurnická	Slovakia	DNF
	Sajedeh Siyahian	Iran	DNF
	Monica Kiplagat	Kenya	DNF
	Rongina Ngandu	Zimbabwe	DNF
	Anta Ndiaye	Senegal	DNF
	Sandra Alonso	Spain	DNF
	Lucie de Marigny-Lagesse	Mauritius	DNF
	Ramadhan Najma	Comoros	DNF
