= 2026 UCI Women's World Tour =

Series of women's road cycling races

- Eleventh edition of the UCI Women's World Tour

Details
- Dates: 17 January – 15 October 2026
- Location: Europe; Oceania; Asia
- Races: 25

The 2026 UCI Women's World Tour was a competition with twenty-five road cycling events throughout the 2026 women's cycling season. The competition began with the opening stage of the Women's Tour Down Under on 17 January, and finished with the final stage of the Tour of Chongming Island on 11 October. It was the eleventh edition of the UCI Women's World Tour – launched by the Union Cycliste Internationale (UCI) in 2016.

At the end of the season, Dutch rider Demi Vollering of FDJ United–Suez led the overall road world rankings, having won six World Tour events (the most of any rider), including winning the Giro d'Italia Women and Tour de France Femmes. Second was Polish rider Katarzyna Niewiadoma-Phinney of Canyon//SRAM and third was Spanish rider Paula Blasi of UAE Team L'Imad.

== Events ==
The initial race calendar for the 2026 season was announced in June 2025, with twenty-eight races initially scheduled. The calendar was similar to 2025, with the elevation of Dwars door Vlaanderen from the UCI ProSeries, and the Giro d'Italia Women moving to June. In October 2025, the calendar was confirmed, with the Simac Ladies Tour of Holland leaving the calendar so it can be held at the same time as the men's Tour of Holland, leaving twenty-seven races on the calendar.

Both La Vuelta Femenina and the Giro d'Italia Women were scheduled to be a day longer, 8 days and 9 days in length respectively. However, La Vuelta Femenina reverted to a seven-day itinerary when announced in March. The Tour de Suisse Women and the Tour of Britain Women also added a day compared to 2025, with the five-day events held over the same number of days as their equivalent men's events, with the Tour of Britain Women held in August as opposed to June.

In May, the Tour de Romandie Féminin was removed from the calendar due to a "shortfall" in sponsorship and other major events being held in the region, including the Grand Départ of the Tour de France Femmes. In August, the Tour of Guangxi was removed from the calendar.

Races in the 2026 UCI Women's World Tour
Race	Date	First	Second	Third
(Australia) Women's Tour Down Under	17–19 January	Noemi Rüegg (SUI)	Mavi García (ESP)	Paula Blasi (ESP)
(Australia) Cadel Evans Great Ocean Road Race	31 January	Ally Wollaston (NZL)	Josie Nelson (GBR)	Mireia Benito (ESP)
(United Arab Emirates) UAE Tour Women	5–8 February	Elisa Longo Borghini (ITA)	Monica Trinca Colonel (ITA)	Femke de Vries (NED)
(Belgium) Omloop Het Nieuwsblad	28 February	Demi Vollering (NED)	Katarzyna Niewiadoma-Phinney (POL)	Lorena Wiebes (NED)
(Italy) Strade Bianche Donne	7 March	Elise Chabbey (SUI)	Katarzyna Niewiadoma-Phinney (POL)	Franziska Koch (GER)
(Italy) Trofeo Alfredo Binda-Comune di Cittiglio	15 March	Karlijn Swinkels (NED)	Anna van der Breggen (NED)	Mie Bjørndal Ottestad (NOR)
(Italy) Milan–San Remo Women	21 March	Lotte Kopecky (BEL)	Noemi Rüegg (SUI)	Eleonora Gasparrini (ITA)
(Belgium) Tour of Bruges Women	26 March	Carys Lloyd (GBR)	Elisa Balsamo (ITA)	Nienke Veenhoven (NED)
(Belgium) Gent–Wevelgem	29 March	Lorena Wiebes (NED)	Fleur Moors (BEL)	Karlijn Swinkels (NED)
(Belgium) Dwars door Vlaanderen	1 April	Marlen Reusser (SUI)	Demi Vollering (NED)	Lieke Nooijen (NED)
(Belgium) Tour of Flanders	5 April	Demi Vollering (NED)	Pauline Ferrand-Prévot (FRA)	Puck Pieterse (NED)
(France) Paris–Roubaix Femmes	12 April	Franziska Koch (GER)	Marianne Vos (NED)	Pauline Ferrand-Prévot (FRA)
(Netherlands) Amstel Gold Race	19 April	Paula Blasi (ESP)	Katarzyna Niewiadoma-Phinney (POL)	Demi Vollering (NED)
(Belgium) La Flèche Wallonne Femmes	22 April	Demi Vollering (NED)	Puck Pieterse (NED)	Paula Blasi (ESP)
(Belgium) Liège–Bastogne–Liège Femmes	26 April	Demi Vollering (NED)	Puck Pieterse (NED)	Katarzyna Niewiadoma-Phinney (POL)
(Spain) La Vuelta Femenina	3–9 May	Paula Blasi (ESP)	Anna van der Breggen (NED)	Marion Bunel (FRA)
(Spain) Itzulia Women	15–17 May	Mischa Bredewold (NED)	Yara Kastelijn (NED)	Lauren Dickson (GBR)
(Spain) Vuelta a Burgos Feminas	21–24 May	Yara Kastelijn (NED)	Évita Muzic (FRA)	Usoa Ostolaza (ESP)
(Italy) Giro d'Italia Women	30 May – 7 June	Demi Vollering (NED)	Antonia Niedermaier (GER)	Anna van der Breggen (NED)
(Denmark) Copenhagen Sprint	13 June	Lorena Wiebes (NED)	Charlotte Kool (NED)	Nienke Veenhoven (NED)
(Switzerland) Tour de Suisse Women	17–21 June	Marlen Reusser (SUI)	Cédrine Kerbaol (FRA)	Katarzyna Niewiadoma-Phinney (POL)
Tour de France Femmes	1–9 August	Demi Vollering (NED)	Katarzyna Niewiadoma-Phinney (POL)	Elisa Longo Borghini (ITA)
(United Kingdom) Tour of Britain Women	19–23 August	Kim Le Court-Pienaar (MRI)	Lorena Wiebes (NED)	Liane Lippert (GER)
(France) Classic Lorient Agglomération	29 August	Elisa Balsamo (ITA)	Mischa Bredewold (NED)	Franziska Koch (GER)
(Switzerland) Tour de Romandie Féminin	4–6 September	Cancelled		
(China) Tour of Chongming Island	9–11 October	Lorena Wiebes (NED)	Lara Gillespie (IRL)	Clara Copponi (FRA)
(China) Tour of Guangxi	18 October	Cancelled		

== 2026 UCI Women's WorldTeams ==
The fourteen Women's WorldTeams were automatically invited to compete in events.

- AG Insurance–Soudal
- Canyon//SRAM
- EF Education–Oatly
- FDJ United–Suez
- Fenix–Premier Tech
- Human Powered Health
- Lidl–Trek
- Liv AlUla Jayco
- Movistar Team
- Team Picnic–PostNL
- Team SD Worx–Protime
- UAE Team L'Imad
- Uno-X Mobility
- Visma–Lease a Bike

== Changes for 2026 ==
The UCI awarded more ranking points to the week long stage races (Giro d'Italia Women, Tour de France Femmes and the Vuelta Femenina) and cycling monuments than other stage or one-day races in the Tour, thereby elevating those races in status.

The participation allowance paid by race organisers paid to teams increased by 20% to support travel costs, with organisers of stage races also required to pay for more hotel rooms per team. Safety requirements for races also increased, with standards regarding feed and waste, team vehicles on the course and checking for technological fraud.

For the first time, WorldTeams were required to compete in the majority of World Tour races, with an obligation to compete in all three Grand Tours (La Vuelta Femenina, Giro d'Italia Women, Tour de France Femmes).
