= 2024 Holland Ladies Tour =

2024 Simac Ladies Tour
2024 UCI Women's World Tour, race 25 of 27

Race details
- Dates: 8–13 September 2024
- Stages: 6
- Distance: 717.3 km (445.7 mi)

Results
Jersey awarded to the overall winner	Winner	Lotte Kopecky (BEL)	(Team SD Worx–Protime)
	Second	Franziska Koch (GER)	(Team dsm–firmenich PostNL)
	Third	Zoe Bäckstedt (GBR)	(Canyon//SRAM)
Jersey awarded to the points classification winner	Points	Lorena Wiebes (NED)	(Team SD Worx–Protime)
Jersey awarded to the mountains classification winner	Mountains	Jeanne Korevaar (NED)	(Liv AlUla Jayco)
Jersey awarded to the young rider classification winner	Young rider	Zoe Bäckstedt (GBR)	(Canyon//SRAM)
	Team	(Netherlands) Team SD Worx–Protime	

The 2024 Holland Ladies Tour (also known as 2024 Simac Ladies Tour) was the 26th edition of the Holland Ladies Tour road cycling stage race, which is the part of the 2024 UCI Women's World Tour. It began on the 8th of September in Gennep and finished on 13th of September in Arnhem.

== Teams ==
Eleven UCI Women's WorldTeams and three UCI Women's Continental Teams made up the fourteen teams that participated in the race.

UCI Women's WorldTeams

- Team SD Worx–Protime
- AG Insurance–Soudal
- Canyon//SRAM
- Fenix–Deceuninck
- Human Powered Health
- Lidl–Trek
- Liv AlUla Jayco
- Team dsm–firmenich PostNL
- Visma–Lease a Bike
- UAE Team ADQ
- Uno-X Mobility

UCI Women's Continental Teams

- Cofidis
- Lotto–Dstny Ladies
- Bepink–Bongioanni

== Route ==
Stage characteristics and winners
Stage	Date	Course	Distance	Type	Stage winner
1	8 October	Gennep to Gennep	10.1 km (6.3 mi)	Individual time trial	Zoe Bäckstedt (GBR)
2	9 October	Coevorden to Assen	154.8 km (96.2 mi)	Flat stage	Lorena Wiebes (NED)
3	10 October	Zeewolde to Zeewolde	148.4 km (92.2 mi)	Flat stage	Lorena Wiebes (NED)
4	11 October	Ede to Ede	118.2 km (73.4 mi)	Flat stage	Barbara Guarischi (ITA)
5	12 October	Doetinchem to Doetinchem	140 km (87 mi)	Flat stage	Lorena Wiebes (NED)
6	13 October	Arnhem to Arnhem	145.8 km (90.6 mi)	Hilly stage	Lotte Kopecky (BEL)
Total			717.3 km (445.7 mi)		

== Stages ==
=== Stage 1 ===
8 October — Gennep to Gennep, 10.1 km (6.3 mi) (ITT)

Stage 1 Result
Rank	Rider	Team	Time
1	Zoe Bäckstedt (GBR)	Canyon//SRAM	12' 40"
2	Lieke Nooijen (NED)	Visma–Lease a Bike	+ 7"
3	Ellen van Dijk (NED)	Lidl–Trek	+ 8"
4	Lotte Kopecky (BEL)	Team SD Worx–Protime	+ 11"
5	Silke Smulders (NED)	Liv AlUla Jayco	+ 16"
6	Anna Henderson (GBR)	Visma–Lease a Bike	+ 24"
7	Riejanne Markus (NED)	Visma–Lease a Bike	+ 29"
8	Christina Schweinberger (AUT)	Fenix–Deceuninck	+ 29"
9	Franziska Koch (GER)	Team dsm–firmenich PostNL	+ 31"
10	Chloé Dygert (USA)	Canyon//SRAM	+ 33"

General classification after Stage 1
Rank	Rider	Team	Time
1	Zoe Bäckstedt (GBR)	Canyon//SRAM	12' 40"
2	Lieke Nooijen (NED)	Visma–Lease a Bike	+ 7"
3	Ellen van Dijk (NED)	Lidl–Trek	+ 8"
4	Lotte Kopecky (BEL)	Team SD Worx–Protime	+ 11"
5	Silke Smulders (NED)	Liv AlUla Jayco	+ 16"
6	Anna Henderson (GBR)	Visma–Lease a Bike	+ 24"
7	Riejanne Markus (NED)	Visma–Lease a Bike	+ 29"
8	Christina Schweinberger (AUT)	Fenix–Deceuninck	+ 29"
9	Franziska Koch (GER)	Team dsm–firmenich PostNL	+ 31"
10	Chloé Dygert (USA)	Canyon//SRAM	+ 33"

=== Stage 2 ===
9 October — Coevorden to Assen, 154.8 km (96.2 mi)

Stage 2 Result
Rank	Rider	Team	Time
1	Lorena Wiebes (NED)	Team SD Worx–Protime	3h 44' 34"
2	Elisa Balsamo (ITA)	Lidl–Trek	+ 0"
3	Charlotte Kool (NED)	Team dsm–firmenich PostNL	+ 8"
4	Nienke Veenhoven (NED)	Visma–Lease a Bike	+ 11"
5	Susanne Andersen (NOR)	Uno-X Mobility	+ 16"
6	Valentine Fortin (FRA)	Cofidis	+ 24"
7	Lara Gillespie (IRL)	UAE Team ADQ	+ 29"
8	Lotte Kopecky (BEL)	Team SD Worx–Protime	+ 29"
9	Katrijn De Clercq (BEL)	Lotto–Dstny Ladies	+ 31"
10	Letizia Paternoster (ITA)	Liv AlUla Jayco	+ 33"

General classification after Stage 2
Rank	Rider	Team	Time
1	Zoe Bäckstedt (GBR)	Canyon//SRAM	3h 57' 14"
2	Lieke Nooijen (NED)	Visma–Lease a Bike	+ 7"
3	Ellen van Dijk (NED)	Lidl–Trek	+ 8"
4	Lotte Kopecky (BEL)	Team SD Worx–Protime	+ 11"
5	Silke Smulders (NED)	Liv AlUla Jayco	+ 16"
6	Anna Henderson (GBR)	Visma–Lease a Bike	+ 24"
7	Riejanne Markus (NED)	Visma–Lease a Bike	+ 29"
8	Christina Schweinberger (AUT)	Fenix–Deceuninck	+ 29"
9	Franziska Koch (GER)	Team dsm–firmenich PostNL	+ 31"
10	Lorena Wiebes (NED)	Team SD Worx–Protime	+ 34"

=== Stage 3 ===
10 October — Zeewolde to Zeewolde, 148.4 km (92.2 mi)

Stage 3 Result
Rank	Rider	Team	Time
1	Lorena Wiebes (NED)	Team SD Worx–Protime	3h 20' 03"
2	Elisa Balsamo (ITA)	Lidl–Trek	+ 0"
3	Lotte Kopecky (BEL)	Team SD Worx–Protime	+ 0"
4	Charlotte Kool (NED)	Team dsm–firmenich PostNL	+ 0"
5	Rachele Barbieri (ITA)	Team dsm–firmenich PostNL	+ 0"
6	Ruby Roseman-Gannon (AUS)	Liv AlUla Jayco	+ 4"
7	Karlijn Swinkels (NED)	UAE Team ADQ	+ 4"
8	Franziska Koch (GER)	Team dsm–firmenich PostNL	+ 4"
9	Megan Jastrab (USA)	Team dsm–firmenich PostNL	+ 4"
10	Ellen van Dijk (NED)	Lidl–Trek	+ 4"

General classification after Stage 3
Rank	Rider	Team	Time
1	Zoe Bäckstedt (GBR)	Canyon//SRAM	7h 17' 21"
2	Lotte Kopecky (BEL)	Team SD Worx–Protime	+ 3
3	Ellen van Dijk (NED)	Lidl–Trek	+ 8"
4	Silke Smulders (NED)	Liv AlUla Jayco	+ 16"
5	Lorena Wiebes (NED)	Team SD Worx–Protime	+ 20"
6	Franziska Koch (GER)	Team dsm–firmenich PostNL	+ 31"
7	Charlotte Kool (NED)	Team dsm–firmenich PostNL	+ 34"
8	Elisa Balsamo (ITA)	Lidl–Trek	+ 36"
9	Elisa Longo Borghini (ITA)	Lidl–Trek	+ 36"
10	Audrey Cordon-Ragot (FRA)	Human Powered Health	+ 41"

=== Stage 4 ===
11 October — Ede to Ede, 118.2 km (73.4 mi)

Stage 4 Result
Rank	Rider	Team	Time
1	Barbara Guarischi (ITA)	Team SD Worx–Protime	2h 49' 53"
2	Ally Wollaston (NZL)	AG Insurance–Soudal	+ 0"
3	Maria Giulia Confalonieri (ITA)	Uno-X Mobility	+ 0"
4	Franziska Koch (GER)	Team dsm–firmenich PostNL	+ 0"
5	Karlijn Swinkels (NED)	UAE Team ADQ	+ 0"
6	Eva van Agt (NED)	Visma–Lease a Bike	+ 0"
7	Femke Markus (NED)	Team SD Worx–Protime	+ 0"
8	Christina Schweinberger (AUT)	Fenix–Deceuninck	+ 0"
9	Quinty Ton (NED)	Liv AlUla Jayco	+ 0"
10	Victoire Berteau (FRA)	Cofidis	+ 0"

General classification after Stage 4
Rank	Rider	Team	Time
1	Franziska Koch (GER)	Team dsm–firmenich PostNL	10h 07' 45"
2	Zoe Bäckstedt (GBR)	Canyon//SRAM	+ 5
3	Lotte Kopecky (BEL)	Team SD Worx–Protime	+ 8"
4	Ellen van Dijk (NED)	Lidl–Trek	+ 13"
5	Karlijn Swinkels (NED)	UAE Team ADQ	+ 19"
6	Silke Smulders (NED)	Liv AlUla Jayco	+ 21"
7	Femke Markus (NED)	Team SD Worx–Protime	+ 24"
8	Lorena Wiebes (NED)	Team SD Worx–Protime	+ 25"
9	Charlotte Kool (NED)	Team dsm–firmenich PostNL	+ 39"
10	Elisa Balsamo (ITA)	Lidl–Trek	+ 41"

=== Stage 5 ===
12 October — Doetinchem to Doetinchem, 140 km (87 mi)

Stage 5 Result
Rank	Rider	Team	Time
1	Lorena Wiebes (NED)	Team SD Worx–Protime	3h 33' 21"
2	Elisa Balsamo (ITA)	Lidl–Trek	+ 0"
3	Nienke Veenhoven (NED)	Visma–Lease a Bike	+ 0"
4	Letizia Paternoster (ITA)	Liv AlUla Jayco	+ 0"
5	Lara Gillespie (IRL)	UAE Team ADQ	+ 0"
6	Ally Wollaston (NZL)	AG Insurance–Soudal	+ 0"
7	Christina Schweinberger (AUT)	Fenix–Deceuninck	+ 0"
8	Rachele Barbieri (ITA)	Team dsm–firmenich PostNL	+ 0"
9	Katrijn De Clercq (BEL)	Lotto–Dstny Ladies	+ 0"
10	Zoe Bäckstedt (GBR)	Canyon//SRAM	+ 0"

General classification after Stage 5
Rank	Rider	Team	Time
1	Franziska Koch (GER)	Team dsm–firmenich PostNL	13h 41' 06"
2	Zoe Bäckstedt (GBR)	Canyon//SRAM	+ 5"
3	Lotte Kopecky (BEL)	Team SD Worx–Protime	+ 8"
4	Ellen van Dijk (NED)	Lidl–Trek	+ 13"
5	Lorena Wiebes (NED)	Team SD Worx–Protime	+ 15"
6	Karlijn Swinkels (NED)	UAE Team ADQ	+ 19"
7	Silke Smulders (NED)	Liv AlUla Jayco	+ 21"
8	Femke Markus (NED)	Team SD Worx–Protime	+ 24"
9	Elisa Balsamo (ITA)	Lidl–Trek	+ 35"
10	Elisa Longo Borghini (ITA)	Lidl–Trek	+ 41"

=== Stage 6 ===
13 October — Arnhem to Arnhem, 145.8 km (90.6 mi)

Stage 6 Result
Rank	Rider	Team	Time
1	Lotte Kopecky (BEL)	Team SD Worx–Protime	3h 44' 49"
2	Lorena Wiebes (NED)	Team SD Worx–Protime	+ 0"
3	Marthe Truyen (BEL)	Fenix–Deceuninck	+ 0"
4	Silke Smulders (NED)	Liv AlUla Jayco	+ 0"
5	Elisa Balsamo (ITA)	Lidl–Trek	+ 0"
6	Susanne Andersen (NOR)	Uno-X Mobility	+ 0"
7	Ally Wollaston (NZL)	AG Insurance–Soudal	+ 0"
8	Franziska Koch (GER)	Team dsm–firmenich PostNL	+ 0"
9	Nienke Veenhoven (NED)	Visma–Lease a Bike	+ 0"
10	Rachele Barbieri (ITA)	Team dsm–firmenich PostNL	+ 0"

General classification after Stage 6
Rank	Rider	Team	Time
1	Lotte Kopecky (BEL)	Team SD Worx–Protime	17h 25' 53"
2	Franziska Koch (GER)	Team dsm–firmenich PostNL	+ 2"
3	Zoe Bäckstedt (GBR)	Canyon//SRAM	+ 7"
4	Lorena Wiebes (NED)	Team SD Worx–Protime	+ 11"
5	Ellen van Dijk (NED)	Lidl–Trek	+ 15"
6	Karlijn Swinkels (NED)	UAE Team ADQ	+ 21"
7	Silke Smulders (NED)	Liv AlUla Jayco	+ 23"
8	Femke Markus (NED)	Team SD Worx–Protime	+ 26"
9	Elisa Balsamo (ITA)	Lidl–Trek	+ 37"
10	Elisa Longo Borghini (ITA)	Lidl–Trek	+ 43"

== Classification leadership table ==
Classification leadership by stage
Stage	Winner	General classification	Points classification	Mountains classification	Young rider classification	Team classification
1	Zoe Bäckstedt	Zoe Bäckstedt	Zoe Bäckstedt	not awarded	Zoe Bäckstedt	Visma–Lease a Bike
2	Lorena Wiebes	Zoe Bäckstedt	Zoe Bäckstedt	Jeanne Korevaar	Zoe Bäckstedt	Visma–Lease a Bike
3	Lorena Wiebes	Zoe Bäckstedt	Lorena Wiebes	Jeanne Korevaar	Zoe Bäckstedt	Lidl–Trek
4	Barbara Guarischi	Franziska Koch	Lorena Wiebes	Jeanne Korevaar	Zoe Bäckstedt	Team SD Worx–Protime
5	Lorena Wiebes	Franziska Koch	Lorena Wiebes	Jeanne Korevaar	Zoe Bäckstedt	Team SD Worx–Protime
6	Lotte Kopecky	Lotte Kopecky	Lorena Wiebes	Jeanne Korevaar	Zoe Bäckstedt	Team SD Worx–Protime
Final		Lotte Kopecky	Lorena Wiebes	Jeanne Korevaar	Zoe Bäckstedt	Team SD Worx–Protime

== Classification standings ==
Legend
Denotes the winner of the general classification	Denotes the winner of the mountains classification
Denotes the winner of the points classification	Denotes the winner of the young rider classification

=== General classification ===
Final general classification (1–10)
Rank	Rider	Team	Time
1	Lotte Kopecky (BEL)	Team SD Worx–Protime	17h 25' 53"
2	Franziska Koch (GER)	Team dsm–firmenich PostNL	+ 2"
3	Zoe Bäckstedt (GBR)	Canyon//SRAM	+ 7"
4	Lorena Wiebes (NED)	Team SD Worx–Protime	+ 11"
5	Ellen van Dijk (NED)	Lidl–Trek	+ 15"
6	Karlijn Swinkels (NED)	UAE Team ADQ	+ 21"
7	Silke Smulders (NED)	Liv AlUla Jayco	+ 23"
8	Femke Markus (NED)	Team SD Worx–Protime	+ 26"
9	Elisa Balsamo (ITA)	Lidl–Trek	+ 37"
10	Elisa Longo Borghini (ITA)	Lidl–Trek	+ 43"

=== Points classification ===
Final points classification (1–10)
Rank	Rider	Team	Points
1	Lorena Wiebes (NED)	Team SD Worx–Protime	97
2	Elisa Balsamo (ITA)	Lidl–Trek	72
3	Lotte Kopecky (BEL)	Team SD Worx–Protime	63
4	Franziska Koch (GER)	Team dsm–firmenich PostNL	45
5	Ally Wollaston (NZL)	AG Insurance–Soudal	39
6	Zoe Bäckstedt (GBR)	Canyon//SRAM	37
7	Nienke Veenhoven (NED)	Visma–Lease a Bike	37
8	Silke Smulders (NED)	Liv AlUla Jayco	30
9	Karlijn Swinkels (NED)	UAE Team ADQ	26
10	Rachele Barbieri (ITA)	Team dsm–firmenich PostNL	26

=== Mountains classification ===
Final mountains classification (1–10)
Rank	Rider	Team	Points
1	Jeanne Korevaar (NED)	Liv AlUla Jayco	20
2	Silke Smulders (NED)	Liv AlUla Jayco	15
3	Victoire Berteau (FRA)	Cofidis	5
4	Karlijn Swinkels (NED)	UAE Team ADQ	3
5	Elisa Longo Borghini (ITA)	Lidl–Trek	3
6	Christine Majerus (LUX)	Team SD Worx–Protime	3
7	Lieke Nooijen (NED)	Visma–Lease a Bike	3
8	Anna Henderson (GBR)	Visma–Lease a Bike	3
9	Femke Gerritse (NED)	Team SD Worx–Protime	3
10	Rebecca Koerner (DEN)	Uno-X Mobility	3

=== Young rider classification ===
Final young rider classification (1–10)
Rank	Rider	Team	Time
1	Zoe Bäckstedt (GBR)	Canyon//SRAM	17h 26' 00"
2	Nienke Veenhoven (NED)	Visma–Lease a Bike	+ 53"
3	Megan Jastrab (USA)	Team dsm–firmenich PostNL	+ 1' 01"
4	Ilse Pluimers (NED)	AG Insurance–Soudal	+ 1' 55"
5	Julie De Wilde (BEL)	Fenix–Deceuninck	+ 2' 39"
6	Linda Riedmann (GER)	Visma–Lease a Bike	+ 2' 54"
7	Anniina Ahtosalo (FIN)	Uno-X Mobility	+ 3' 19"
8	Ava Holmgren (CAN)	Lidl–Trek	+ 10' 50"
9	Alberte Greve (DEN)	Lotto–Dstny Ladies	+ 11' 09"
10	Silje Bader (NED)	Team dsm–firmenich PostNL	+ 11' 42"

=== Team classification ===
Final team classification
Rank	Team	Time
1	(Netherlands) Team SD Worx–Protime	52h 18' 30"
2	(United States) Lidl–Trek	+ 49"
3	(Netherlands) Team dsm–firmenich PostNL	+ 57"
4	(Australia) Liv AlUla Jayco	+ 1' 25"
5	(Netherlands) Visma–Lease a Bike	+ 2' 38"
6	(Belgium) AG Insurance–Soudal	+ 4' 45"
7	(Norway) Uno-X Mobility	+ 5' 14"
8	(Belgium) Fenix–Deceuninck	+ 5' 50"
9	(United Arab Emirates) UAE Team ADQ	+ 12' 30"
