= 2022 European Road Championships – Women's road race =

Women's elite road race
2022 European Road Championships

Race details
- Dates: 21 August 2022
- Stages: 1
- Distance: 129.8 km (80.65 mi)

Medalists
	Gold	Lorena Wiebes (NED)
	Silver	Elisa Balsamo (ITA)
	Bronze	Rachele Barbieri (ITA)

The women's elite road race at the 2022 European Road Championships took place on 21 August 2022, in Munich, Germany. Nations were allowed to enter between 1 and 8 riders into the event, dependent on UCI rankings.

== Results ==
Rank	#	Cyclist	Nation	Time	Diff.
1st place, gold medalist(s)	8	Lorena Wiebes	Netherlands	2:59:20	
2nd place, silver medalist(s)	9	Elisa Balsamo	Italy	s.t.	
3rd place, bronze medalist(s)	10	Rachele Barbieri	Italy	s.t.	
4	30	Lisa Brennauer	Germany	s.t.	
5	49	Daria Pikulik	Poland	s.t.	
6	96	Maria Martins	Portugal	s.t.	
7	51	Emma Cecilie Berg	Denmark	s.t.	
8	79	Emilia Fahlin	Sweden	s.t.	
9	43	Gladys Verhulst	France	s.t.	
10	68	Christina Schweinberger	Austria	s.t.	
11	50	Agnieszka Skalniak-Sójka	Poland	s.t.	
12	81	Rasa Leleivytė	Lithuania	s.t.	
13	91	Anastasia Carbonari	Latvia	s.t.	
14	87	Tereza Neumanová	Czech Republic	s.t.	
15	58	Sandra Alonso	Spain	s.t.	
16	83	Christine Majerus	Luxembourg	s.t.	
17	19	Marlen Reusser	Netherlands	s.t.	
18	75	Eugenia Bujak	Slovenia	s.t.	
19	46	Marta Jaskulska	Poland	s.t.	
20	17	Caroline Baur	Switzerland	s.t.	
21	48	Marta Lach	Poland	s.t.	
22	47	Karolina Kumięga	Poland	s.t.	
23	76	Špela Kern	Slovenia	s.t.	
24	21	Sanne Cant	Belgium	s.t.	
25	64	Lourdes Oyarbide	Spain	s.t.	
26	67	Carina Schrempf	Austria	2:59:27	00:07
27	90	Omer Shapira	Israel	2:59:30	00:10
28	89	Rotem Gafinovitz	Israel	s.t.	
29	95	Alice Sharpe	Ireland	s.t.	
30	63	Sara Martín	Spain	s.t.	
31	35	Liane Lippert	Germany	s.t.	
32	16	Ilaria Sanguineti	Italy	s.t.	
33	40	Eugénie Duval	France	s.t.	
34	24	Justine Ghekiere	Belgium	s.t.	
35	71	Susanne Andersen	Norway	s.t.	
36	53	Amalie Dideriksen	Denmark	s.t.	
37	44	Margaux Vigie	France	s.t.	
38	31	Romy Kasper	Germany	s.t.	
39	56	Julie Leth	Denmark	s.t.	
40	82	Inga Cešuliene	Lithuania	2:59:36	00:16
41	5	Floortje Mackaij	Netherlands	2:59:38	00:18
42	7	Ellen van Dijk	Netherlands	s.t.	
43	4	Anouska Koster	Netherlands	s.t.	
44	2	Charlotte Kool	Netherlands	2:59:40	00:20
45	13	Maria Giulia Confalonieri	Italy	s.t.	
46	18	Lea Fuchs	Switzerland	2:57:45	s.t.
47	66	Sarah Rijkes	Austria	2:59:43	00:22
48	15	Barbara Guarischi	Italy	2:59:44	00:24
49	34	Mieke Kröger	Germany	s.t.	
50	6	Riejanne Markus	Netherlands	s.t.	
51	14	Arianna Fidanza	Italy	2:59:51	00:31
52	80	Hanna Nilsson	Sweden	s.t.	
53	74	Ingvild Gåskjenn	Norway	s.t.	
54	42	Juliette Labous	France	s.t.	
55	38	Audrey Cordon-Ragot	France	s.t.	
56	37	Victoire Berteau	France	s.t.	
57	97	Antonia Gröndahl	Finland	2:59:58	00:38
58	36	Lea Teutenberg	Germany	3:00:26	01:06
59	61	Sheyla Gutiérrez	Spain	3:00:41	01:21
60	12	Elena Cecchini	Italy	3:00:44	01:24
61	39	Coralie Demay	France	3:00:48	01:28
62	3	Jeanne Korevaar	Netherlands	3:02:01	02:41
63	73	Malin Eriksen	Norway	3:02:19	02:59
64	98	Laura Vainionpää	Finland	3:02:21	03:01
65	86	Markéta Hájková	Czech Republic	3:02:23	03:03
66	85	Nikola Bajgerová	Czech Republic	s.t.	
67	78	Nathalie Eklund	Sweden	s.t.	
68	1	Thalita de Jong	Netherlands	s.t.	
69	28	Jesse Vandenbulcke	Belgium	s.t.	
70	45	Monika Brzeźna	Poland	s.t.	
71	54	Trine Holmsgaard	Denmark	s.t.	
72	72	Stine Borgli	Norway	s.t.	
73	26	Marthe Truyen	Belgium	3:02:28	03:08
74	59	Mireia Benito	Spain	s.t.	
75	23	Valerie Demey	Belgium	s.t.	
76	77	Urška Žigart	Slovenia	s.t.	
77	62	Ziortza Isasi	Spain	s.t.	
78	69	Kathrin Schweinberger	Austria	s.t.	
79	88	Nikola Nosková	Czech Republic	3:02:32	03:12
80	33	Franziska Koch	Germany	s.t.	
81	32	Lisa Klein	Germany	s.t.	
82	29	Franziska Brausse	Germany	s.t.	
83	11	Marta Bastianelli	Italy	s.t.	
84	41	Valentine Fortin	France	s.t.	
85	27	Julie Van de Velde	Belgium	s.t.	
86	25	Lone Meertens	Belgium	s.t.	
87	84	Jelena Erić	Serbia	s.t.	
DNF	20	Michelle Stark	Switzerland		
DNF	22	Kim de Baat	Belgium		
DNF	52	Maja Winther Brandt	Denmark		
DNF	55	Marita Jensen	Denmark		
DNF	57	Mia Sofie Rützou	Denmark		
DNF	60	Iurani Blanco	Spain		
DNF	65	Alina Reichert	Austria		
DNF	70	Gabriela Thanner	Austria		
DNF	92	Dana Rožlapa	Latvia		
DNF	93	Hafdís Sigurðardóttir	Iceland		
DNF	94	Silja Jóhannesdóttir	Iceland		
DNF	99	Manuela Miresan	Romania		
