= 2025 UCI Track Cycling World Championships – Women's omnium =

Women's omnium at the 2025 UCI Track Cycling World Championships
- Venue: Velódromo Peñalolén
- Location: Santiago, Chile
- Dates: 24 October
- Competitors: 22 from 22 nations
- Winning points: 136

Medalists
gold medal	Lorena Wiebes	Netherlands
silver medal	Marion Borras	France
bronze medal	Amalie Dideriksen	Denmark

The Women's omnium competition at the 2025 UCI Track Cycling World Championships was held on 24 October 2025.

== Results ==
=== Scratch race ===
The scratch race was started at 16:38.

Rank	Name	Nation	Laps down	Event points
1	Lorena Wiebes	Netherlands		40
2	Amalie Dideriksen	Denmark		38
3	Shari Bossuyt	Belgium		36
4	Marion Borras	France		34
5	Petra Ševčíková	Czech Republic		32
6	Maeve Plouffe	Australia		30
7	Anita Stenberg	Norway		28
8	Lara Gillespie	Ireland		26
9	Samantha Donnelly	New Zealand		24
10	Eva Anguela	Spain		22
11	Megan Jastrab	United States		20
12	Lily Plante	Canada		18
13	Scarlet Cortes	Chile		16
14	Alžbeta Bačíková	Slovakia		14
15	Olga Wankiewicz	Poland		12
16	Yareli Acevedo	Mexico		10
17	Messane Bräutigam	Germany		8
18	Vittoria Guazzini	Italy		6
19	Yumi Kajihara	Japan		4
20	Akvilė Gedraitytė	Lithuania		2
21	Aline Seitz	Switzerland		1
22	Jessica Roberts	Great Britain		1
—	Valeriya Valgonen	Individual Neutral Athletes	Did not start	
—	Ebtissam Mohamed	Egypt	Did not start	

=== Tempo race ===
The tempo race was started at 13:34.

Rank	Name	Nation	Lap points	Sprint points	Total points	Event points
1	Jessica Roberts	Great Britain	20	5	25	40
2	Marion Borras	France	20	1	21	38
3	Shari Bossuyt	Belgium	0	6	6	36
4	Amalie Dideriksen	Denmark	0	4	4	34
5	Lorena Wiebes	Netherlands	0	3	3	32
6	Anita Stenberg	Norway	0	2	2	30
7	Yumi Kajihara	Japan	0	2	2	28
8	Yareli Acevedo	Mexico	0	2	2	26
9	Messane Bräutigam	Germany	0	1	1	24
10	Lara Gillespie	Ireland	0	1	1	22
11	Aline Seitz	Switzerland	0	1	1	20
12	Eva Anguela	Spain	20	1	1	18
13	Vittoria Guazzini	Italy	−20	2	−18	16
14	Olga Wankiewicz	Poland	−20	1	−19	14
15	Petra Ševčíková	Czech Republic	−20	1	−19	12
16	Scarlet Cortes	Chile	−20	1	−19	10
17	Megan Jastrab	United States	−20	1	−19	8
18	Akvilė Gedraitytė	Lithuania	−20	0	−20	6
19	Samantha Donnelly	New Zealand	−20	0	−20	4
20	Lily Plante	Canada	−20	0	−20	2
21	Maeve Plouffe	Australia	−40	1	−39	1
22	Alžbeta Bačíková	Slovakia	−40	0	−40	1
—	Valeriya Valgonen	Individual Neutral Athletes	Did not start			
—	Ebtissam Mohamed	Egypt	Did not start			

=== Elimination race ===
The elimination race was started at 18:02.

Rank	Name	Nation	Event points
1	Lorena Wiebes	Netherlands	40
2	Yareli Acevedo	Mexico	38
3	Shari Bossuyt	Belgium	36
4	Yumi Kajihara	Japan	34
5	Amalie Dideriksen	Denmark	32
6	Aline Seitz	Switzerland	30
7	Marion Borras	France	28
8	Eva Anguela	Spain	26
9	Samantha Donnelly	New Zealand	24
10	Maeve Plouffe	Australia	22
11	Lara Gillespie	Ireland	20
12	Petra Ševčíková	Czech Republic	18
13	Alžbeta Bačíková	Slovakia	16
14	Jessica Roberts	Great Britain	14
15	Megan Jastrab	United States	12
16	Olga Wankiewicz	Poland	10
17	Vittoria Guazzini	Italy	8
18	Akvilė Gedraitytė	Lithuania	
19	Anita Stenberg	Norway	6
20	Scarlet Cortes	Chile	4
21	Lily Plante	Canada	2
22	Messane Bräutigam	Germany	1
—	Valeriya Valgonen	Individual Neutral Athletes	Did not start
—	Ebtissam Mohamed	Egypt	Did not start

=== Points race and overall standings ===
The points race was started at 19:35.

Rank	Name	Nation	Lap points	Sprint points	Total points
1st place, gold medalist(s)	Lorena Wiebes	Netherlands	0	26	136
2nd place, silver medalist(s)	Marion Borras	France	20	7	127
3rd place, bronze medalist(s)	Amalie Dideriksen	Denmark	0	16	120
4	Shari Bossuyt	Belgium	0	9	117
5	Yareli Acevedo	Mexico	20	1	101
6	Lara Gillespie	Ireland	20	5	95
7	Yumi Kajihara	Japan	20	10	94
8	Eva Anguela	Spain	20	1	87
9	Petra Ševčíková	Czech Republic	20	3	85
10	Anita Stenberg	Norway	20	0	80
11	Jessica Roberts	Great Britain	20	5	80
12	Aline Seitz	Switzerland	20	0	71
13	Samantha Donnelly	New Zealand	0	8	60
14	Vittoria Guazzini	Italy	20	5	55
15	Megan Jastrab	United States	0	0	40
16	Olga Wankiewicz	Poland	0	2	38
17	Messane Bräutigam	Germany	0	1	32
18	Scarlet Cortes	Chile	0	0	28
19	Lily Plante	Canada	0	0	21
20	Akvilė Gedraitytė	Lithuania	0	0	14
21	Maeve Plouffe	Australia	0	0	13
22	Alžbeta Bačíková	Slovakia	−20	0	−29
—	Valeriya Valgonen	Individual Neutral Athletes	Did not start		
—	Ebtissam Mohamed	Egypt	Did not start		
