= Kathrin Schweinberger =

Austrian cyclist (born 1996)

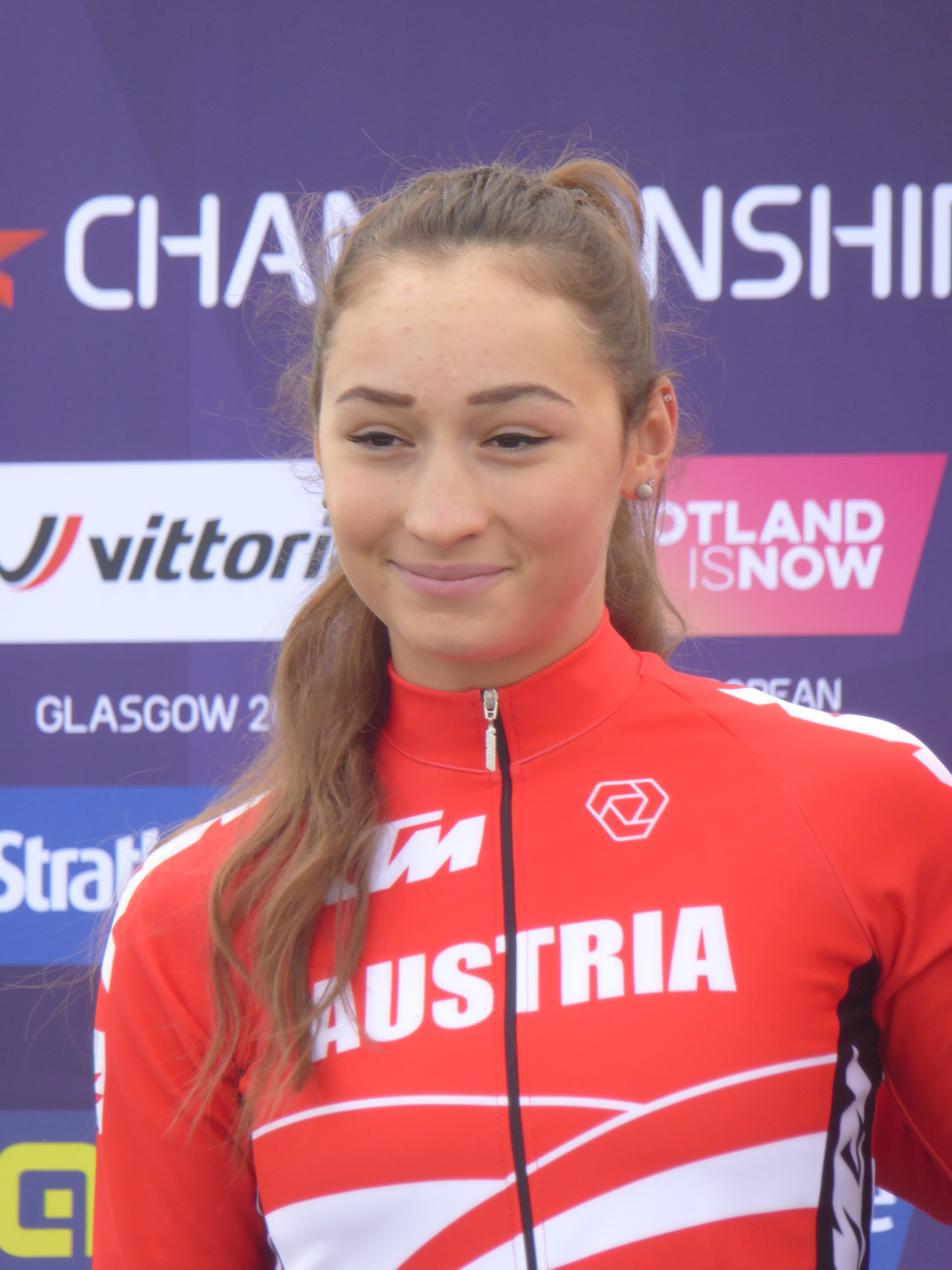
- Schweinberger at the 2018 European Road Cycling Championships.

Personal information
- Full name: Kathrin Schweinberger
- Born: 29 October 1996 (age 29)

Cycling career
- Sport: Cycling
- Current team: Human Powered Health
- Disciplines: Road; Track
- Role: Rider

Amateur team
- ÖAMTC tomSILLER.at Radclub Tirol

Professional teams
- 2018–2019: Health Mate–Cyclelive Team
- 2020–2021: Doltcini–Van Eyck Sport
- 2022–2024: Ceratizit–WNT Pro Cycling
- 2025–: Human Powered Health

Kathrin Schweinberger (born 29 October 1996) is an Austrian racing cyclist, who currently rides for UCI Women's WorldTeam Human Powered Health. She rode in the women's road race event at the 2017 UCI Road World Championships. Her twin sister Christina Schweinberger is also a professional cyclist.

== Major results ==
=== Road ===
2011
3rd Road race, National Novices Road Championships
2012
National Novices Road Championships

1st Time trial
1st Road race

2013
National Junior Road Championships

1st Time trial
3rd Road Race

2014
National Junior Road Championships

1st Road race
1st Time trial

1st Cham-Hagendorn
2015
National Road Championships

4th Road Race
5th Time Trial

2017
5th Road Race, National Road Championships
10th Tour of Guangxi
2018
2nd Overall Tour of Uppsala

1st Points classification
1st Stage 2

2nd Diamond Tour
8th Volta Limburg Classic,
2019
2nd Grote Prijs Gemeente Kallo
3rd Road Race, National Road Championships
3rd SwissEver GP Cham-Hagendorn
3rd V4 Ladies Series - Restart Zalaegerszeg
4th Salverda Omloop van de IJsseldelta
4th MerXem Classic
5th Trofee Maarten Wynants
5th Spar Flanders Diamond Tour
8th Erondegemse Pijl
8th Flanders Ladies Classic
2020
1st Road race, National Road Championships
7th Grote Prijs Euromat
2021
1st Road race, National Road Championships
2022
3rd Road race, National Road Championships
8th La Classique Morbihan
2023
2nd Diamond Tour
2nd Grand Prix Stuttgart & Region
2nd Ladies Tour of Estonia
National Road Championships

3rd Road race
4th Time trial

4th Dwars door de Westhoek
4th Konvert Koerse
5th Dwars door het Hageland
7th Scheldeprijs
2024
1st Dwars door de Westhoek
3rd Flanders Diamond Tour
4th Trofeo Felanitx-Colònia de Sant Jordi
4th Road race, National Road Championships
4th Tour of Guangxi
6th La Picto–Charentaise
6th Road race, European Road Championships
6th Tour of Chongming Island
7th Antwerp Port Epic
9th Dwars door het Hageland
10th GP Mazda Schelkens
2025
3rd Argenta Classic - Deurne
6th Schwalbe Women's One Day Classic
9th Surf Coast Classic
10th Classic Brugge–De Panne Women
2026
10th Copenhagen Sprint

=== Track ===
2013
National Track Championships

1st 500m time trial
1st Omnium
1st Scratch
2nd Individual Pursuit
3rd Points Race

2014

3rd Individual Pursuit
2nd Points Race
2nd Scratch Race
2nd 500m Time Trial
2nd Omnium

2015
National Track Championships

1st 500m time trial
1st Omnium
1st Scratch
