= 2025 Gent–Wevelgem (women's race) =

Cycling race

2025 Gent–Wevelgem In Flanders Fields
2025 UCI Women's World Tour, race 9 of 27
- Event poster with previous winners Lorena Wiebes and Mads Pedersen

Race details
- Dates: 30 March 2025
- Stages: 1
- Distance: 168.9 km (104.9 mi)
- Winning time: 4h 11' 19"

Results
	Winner	Lorena Wiebes (NED)	(Team SD Worx–Protime)
	Second	Elisa Balsamo (ITA)	(Lidl–Trek)
	Third	Charlotte Kool (NED)	(Team Picnic–PostNL)

The 2025 Gent–Wevelgem In Flanders Fields was a Belgian road cycling one-day race that took place on 30 March in the provinces of West Flanders and Hainaut in west Belgium. It was the 14th edition of Gent–Wevelgem and the 9th event of the 2025 UCI Women's World Tour. The race was won by Dutch rider Lorena Wiebes of Team SD Worx–Protime in a sprint finish, with Kopecky taking the 100th win of her career.

== Route ==
The race uses the same course as previous years. Starting at the Menin Gate in Ypres, the route covered 168.9 kilometres (104.9 mi), with seven climbs including the iconic Kemmelberg (2.5 km (1.6 mi) in length with an average gradient of 4.4%, with a maximum gradient of 22%). The race finished on the Vanackerestraat, the central avenue in Wevelgem.

== Teams ==
Twenty-four teams took part in the event, including fifteen UCI Women's WorldTeams, six UCI Women's ProTeams and three Women's continental teams.

UCI Women's WorldTeams

- AG Insurance–Soudal
- Canyon//SRAM zondacrypto
- Ceratizit Pro Cycling
- FDJ–Suez
- Fenix–Deceuninck
- Human Powered Health
- Lidl–Trek
- Liv AlUla Jayco
- Movistar Team
- Roland
- Team Picnic–PostNL
- Team SD Worx–Protime
- UAE Team ADQ
- Uno-X Mobility
- Visma–Lease a Bike

UCI Women's ProTeams

- Arkéa–B&B Hotels Women
- Cofidis
- EF Education–Oatly
- St. Michel–Preference Home–Auber93
- VolkerWessels Cycling Team
- Winspace Orange Seal

UCI Women's Continental Teams

- BePink–Imatra–Bongioanni
- DD Group Pro Cycling Team
- Lotto Ladies

== Result ==
Result
Rank	Rider	Team	Time
1	Lorena Wiebes (NED)	Team SD Worx–Protime	4h 11' 19"
2	Elisa Balsamo (ITA)	Lidl–Trek	+ 0"
3	Charlotte Kool (NED)	Team Picnic–PostNL	+ 0"
4	Marjolein van 't Geloof (NED)	Arkéa–B&B Hotels Women	+ 0"
5	Chiara Consonni (ITA)	Canyon//SRAM zondacrypto	+ 0"
6	Lara Gillespie (IRE)	UAE Team ADQ	+ 0"
7	Lily Williams (USA)	Human Powered Health	+ 0"
8	Ally Wollaston (NZL)	FDJ–Suez	+ 0"
9	Gladys Verhulst-Wild (FRA)	AG Insurance–Soudal	+ 0"
10	Kaja Rysz (POL)	Roland	+ 0"

== See also ==
- 2025 in women's road cycling
