= Akvilė =

- Gender: Female
- Language: Lithuanian
- Name day: 23 March

Origin
- Region of origin: Lithuania

Akvilė is a Lithuanian feminine given name. People bearing the name Akvilė include:

- Akvilė Gedraitytė (born 2001), Lithuanian racing cyclist
- Akvilė Paražinskaitė (born 1996), Lithuanian tennis player
- Akvilė Stapušaitytė (born 1986), Lithuanian badminton player
