= 2025 UEC European Track Championships – Women's scratch =

Women's scratch at the 2025 UEC European Track Championships
- Venue: Velodroom Limburg, Heusden-Zolder
- Date: 12 February
- Competitors: 19 from 19 nations

Medalists
gold medal	Martina Fidanza	Italy
silver medal	Lorena Wiebes	Netherlands
bronze medal	Maria Martins	Portugal

The women's scratch competition at the 2025 UEC European Track Championships was held on 12 February 2025.

== Results ==
First rider across the line without a net lap loss wins.

Rank	Name	Nation	Laps down
1st place, gold medalist(s)	Martina Fidanza	Italy	
2nd place, silver medalist(s)	Lorena Wiebes	Netherlands	
3rd place, bronze medalist(s)	Maria Martins	Portugal	
4	Anita Stenberg	Norway	
5	Anna Morris	Great Britain	
6	Petra Ševčíková	Czech Republic	
7	Mia Griffin	Ireland	
8	Lorena Leu	Switzerland	
9	Akvilė Gedraitytė	Lithuania	
10	Alžbeta Bačíková	Slovakia	
11	Ellen Klinge	Denmark	
12	Eva Anguela	Spain	
13	Eliza Rabażyńska	Poland	
14	Tetiana Yashchenko	Ukraine	
15	Lea Lin Teutenberg	Germany	
16	Hanna Tserakh	Individual Neutral Athletes 1	
17	Lani Wittevrongel	Belgium	
18	Maria Averina	Individual Neutral Athletes 2	
19	Mélanie Dupin	France	
