= Franziska Koch =

Franziska Koch may refer to:

- Franziska Romana Koch (1748–1796), German ballet dancer, soprano and actress
- Franziska Koch (cyclist) (born 2000), German cyclist
