= 2026 Gent–Wevelgem (women's race) =

Cycling race

2026 UCI Women's World Tour, race 9 of 26
- Event poster with previous winner Lorena Wiebes

Race details
- Dates: 29 March 2026
- Stages: 1
- Distance: 135.2 km (84.0 mi)
- Winning time: 3h 31' 21"

Results
	Winner	Lorena Wiebes (NED)	(Team SD Worx–Protime)
	Second	Fleur Moors (BEL)	(Lidl–Trek)
	Third	Karlijn Swinkels (NED)	(UAE Team ADQ)

The 2026 Gent–Wevelgem In Flanders Fields was a Belgian road cycling one-day race that took place on 29 March in the provinces of West Flanders and Hainaut in west Belgium. It was the 15th edition of Gent–Wevelgem and the 9th event of the 2026 UCI Women's World Tour. The race was won by Dutch rider Lorena Wiebes of Team SD Worx–Protime for a third consecutive year.

== Teams ==
Twenty-two teams participated in the race, including all fourteen UCI Women's WorldTeams, six UCI Women's ProTeams, and two UCI Women's Continental Teams.

UCI Women's WorldTeams

- AG Insurance–Soudal
- Canyon//SRAM Zondacrypto
- EF Education–Oatly
- FDJ United–Suez
- Fenix–Premier Tech
- Human Powered Health
- Lidl–Trek
- Liv AlUla Jayco
- Movistar Team
- Team Picnic–PostNL
- Team SD Worx–Protime
- UAE Team ADQ
- Uno-X Mobility
- Visma–Lease a Bike

UCI Women's ProTeams

- Cofidis
- Laboral Kutxa–Fundación Euskadi
- Lotto–Intermarché Ladies
- Ma Petite Entreprise
- St. Michel–Preference Home–Auber93
- VolkerWessels Cycling Team

UCI Women's Continental Teams

- Citymesh–Customm Pro Cycling Team
- Minimax Cycling Team

== Result ==
Result
Rank	Rider	Team	Time
1	Lorena Wiebes (NED)	Team SD Worx–Protime	3h 31' 21"
2	Fleur Moors (BEL)	Lidl–Trek	+ 0"
3	Karlijn Swinkels (NED)	UAE Team ADQ	+ 0"
4	Elise Chabbey (SUI)	FDJ United–Suez	+ 0"
5	Eleonora Gasparrini (ITA)	UAE Team ADQ	+ 3"
6	Vittoria Guazzini (ITA)	FDJ United–Suez	+ 17"
7	Charlotte Kool (NED)	Fenix–Premier Tech	+ 17"
8	Letizia Paternoster (ITA)	Liv AlUla Jayco	+ 17"
9	Femke Markus (NED)	Team SD Worx–Protime	+ 17"
10	Lara Gillespie (IRE)	UAE Team ADQ	+ 17"

== See also ==
- 2026 in women's road cycling
