= 2024 Gent–Wevelgem (women's race) =

Cycling race

2024 Gent–Wevelgem In Flanders Fields
2024 UCI Women's World Tour, race 9 of 27
- Event poster with previous winners Marlen Reusser and Christophe Laporte

Race details
- Dates: 24 March 2024
- Stages: 1
- Distance: 171.2 km (106.4 mi)
- Winning time: 4h 16' 19"

Results
	Winner	Lorena Wiebes (NED)	(Team SD Worx–Protime)
	Second	Elisa Balsamo (ITA)	(Lidl–Trek)
	Third	Chiara Consonni (ITA)	(UAE Team ADQ)

The 2024 Gent–Wevelgem In Flanders Fields was a Belgian road cycling one-day race that took place on 24 March. It was the 13th edition of Gent–Wevelgem and the 9th event of the 2024 UCI Women's World Tour.

The race was won by Dutch rider Lorena Wiebes of Team SD Worx–Protime in a sprint finish.

== Teams ==
Fifteen UCI Women's WorldTeams and nine UCI Women's Continental Teams took part in the race.

UCI Women's WorldTeams

- AG Insurance–Soudal
- Canyon–SRAM
- Ceratizit–WNT Pro Cycling
- FDJ–Suez
- Fenix–Deceuninck
- Human Powered Health
- Lidl–Trek
- Liv AlUla Jayco
- Movistar Team
- Roland
- Team dsm–firmenich PostNL
- Team SD Worx–Protime
- UAE Team ADQ
- Uno-X Mobility
- Visma–Lease a Bike

UCI Women's Continental Teams

- Arkéa–B&B Hotels Women
- Chevalmeire
- Cofidis
- EF Education–Cannondale
- Lifeplus Wahoo
- Lotto–Dstny Ladies
- Proximus-Cyclis CT
- Team Coop–Repsol
- VolkerWessels Women Cyclingteam

== Result ==
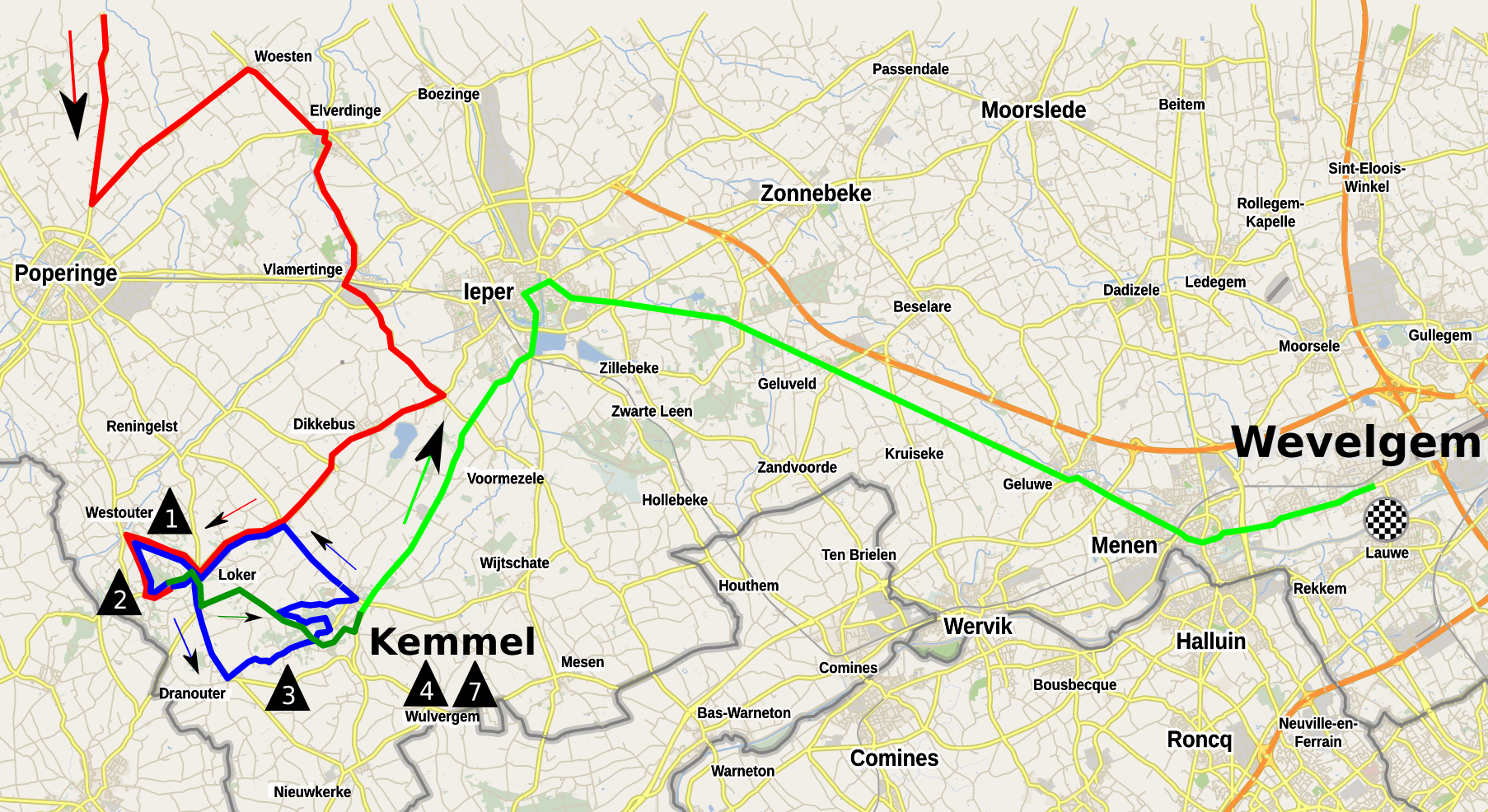
Route map

Result
Rank	Rider	Team	Time
1	Lorena Wiebes (NED)	Team SD Worx–Protime	4h 16' 19"
2	Elisa Balsamo (ITA)	Lidl–Trek	+ 0"
3	Chiara Consonni (ITA)	UAE Team ADQ	+ 0"
4	Charlotte Kool (NED)	Team dsm–firmenich PostNL	+ 0"
5	Maria Giulia Confalonieri (ITA)	Uno-X Mobility	+ 0"
6	Arlenis Sierra (CUB)	Movistar Team	+ 0"
7	Puck Pieterse (NED)	Fenix–Deceuninck	+ 0"
8	Thalita de Jong (NED)	Lotto–Dstny Ladies	+ 0"
9	Christina Schweinberger (AUT)	Fenix–Deceuninck	+ 0"
10	Maggie Coles-Lyster (CAN)	Roland	+ 0"

== See also ==
- 2024 in women's road cycling
