= GP Sofie Goos =

Race details
- Date: July 8
- Region: Belgium
- Local name: Berchem-Borgerhout
- Discipline: Road
- Competition: National (2009, 2017); 1.2 (2018– )

History
- First edition: 2009
- Editions: 3 (as of 2018)
- First winner: Ludivine Henrion (BEL)
- Most wins: No repeat winners
- Most recent: Lorena Wiebes (NED)

The GP Sofie Goos is a women's staged cycle race which takes place in Belgium and is currently rated by the UCI as category 1.2.

== Overall winners ==
Year	Country	Rider	Team
2009	Belgium	Ludivine Henrion	Red Sun Cycling Team
2017	Belgium	Sarah Inghelbrecht	Lares–Waowdeals
2018	Netherlands	Lorena Wiebes	Parkhotel Valkenburg
