= 2026 Copenhagen Sprint (women's race) =

Cycling race

2026 UCI Women's World Tour, race 20 of 26

Race details
- Dates: 13 June 2026
- Stages: 1
- Distance: 156 km (97 mi)
- Winning time: 3h 41' 46"

Results
	Winner	Lorena Wiebes (NED)	(Team SD Worx–Protime)
	Second	Charlotte Kool (NED)	(Fenix–Premier Tech)
	Third	Nienke Veenhoven (NED)	(Visma–Lease a Bike)

The 2026 Copenhagen Sprint was a Danish road cycling one-day race that took place on 13 June. It was the second edition of the Copenhagen Sprint and the 20th event of the 2025 UCI Women's World Tour. Dutch rider Lorena Wiebes of Team SD Worx–Protime won the race in a sprint finish, for the second year in a row.

== Teams ==
Seventeen teams participated in the race, including 10 UCI Women's WorldTeams, 6 UCI Women's Continental Teams and 1 national team.

UCI Women's WorldTeams

- Canyon//SRAM
- EF Education–Oatly
- Fenix–Premier Tech
- Human Powered Health
- Lidl–Trek
- Liv AlUla Jayco
- Team Picnic–PostNL
- Team SD Worx–Protime
- Uno-X Mobility
- Visma–Lease a Bike

UCI Women's Continental Teams

- Citymesh–Customm Pro Cycling Team
- DAS–Hutchinson
- Hitec Products–Fluid Control
- O'Shea Redchilli Bikes
- Rembe / Rad-Net
- Vini Fantini–BePink

National teams

- Denmark

== Result ==
Result
Rank	Rider	Team	Time
1	Lorena Wiebes (NED)	Team SD Worx–Protime	3h 41' 46"
2	Charlotte Kool (NED)	Fenix–Premier Tech	+ 0"
3	Nienke Veenhoven (NED)	Visma–Lease a Bike	+ 0"
4	Linda Zanetti (SWI)	Uno-X Mobility	+ 0"
5	Chiara Consonni (ITA)	Canyon//SRAM	+ 0"
6	Elisa Balsamo (ITA)	Lidl–Trek	+ 0"
7	Georgia Baker (AUS)	Liv AlUla Jayco	+ 0"
8	Amalie Dideriksen (DEN)	Denmark	+ 0"
9	Maggie Coles-Lyster (CAN)	Human Powered Health	+ 0"
10	Kathrin Schweinberger (AUT)	Human Powered Health	+ 0"
