= 2026 UCI Track Cycling World Championships – Women's scratch =

Women's scratch at the 2026 UCI Track Cycling World Championships
- Venue: Shanghai Velodrome
- Location: Shanghai, China
- Dates: 14 October
- Competitors: 24 from 24 nations

Medalists
gold medal	Lorena Wiebes	Netherlands
silver medal	Lara Gillespie	Ireland
bronze medal	Maria Martins	Portugal

The women's scratch competition at the 2026 UCI Track Cycling World Championships was held on 14 October 2026.

== Results ==
The race was started at 18:59. First rider across the line without a net lap loss won.

Rank	Name	Nation	Laps down
1st place, gold medalist(s)	Lorena Wiebes	Netherlands	
2nd place, silver medalist(s)	Lara Gillespie	Ireland	
3rd place, bronze medalist(s)	Maria Martins	Portugal	
4	Martina Fidanza	Italy	
5	Lee Sze Wing	Hong Kong	
6	Eva Anguela	Spain	
7	Amalie Dideriksen	Denmark	
8	Lea Lin Teutenberg	Germany	
9	Nafosat Kozieva	Uzbekistan	
10	Olivija Baleišytė	Lithuania	
11	Scarlet Cortés	Chile	
12	Teniel Campbell	Trinidad and Tobago	
13	Prudence Fowler	New Zealand	
14	Maeve Plouffe	Australia	
15	Aline Seitz	Switzerland	
16	Emma Jimenez Palos	United States	
17	Abi Miller	Great Britain	
18	Petra Ševčíková	Czechia	
19	Misaki Okamoto	Japan	
20	Yuan Haidi	China	
21	Hélène Hesters	Belgium	
22	Anita Stenberg	Norway	
23	Valentine Fortin	France	
24	Andrea Robles	Mexico	
