= 2025 Classic Brugge–De Panne Women =

Cycling race

2025 Classic Brugge–De Panne
2025 UCI Women's World Tour, race 8 of 27

Race details
- Dates: 27 March 2025
- Stages: 1
- Distance: 152.7 km (94.9 mi)
- Winning time: 3h 42' 13"

Results
	Winner	Lorena Wiebes (NED)	(Team SD Worx–Protime)
	Second	Chiara Consonni (ITA)	(Canyon//SRAM)
	Third	Elisa Balsamo (ITA)	(Lidl–Trek)

The 2025 Classic Brugge–De Panne was a Belgian road cycling one-day race that took place on 27 March. It was the 8th edition of Classic Brugge–De Panne and the 8th event of the 2025 UCI Women's World Tour. The race was won by Dutch rider Lorena Wiebes of Team SD Worx–Protime for the second time, winning in a sprint finish.

== Teams ==
Twenty-three teams took part in the event, including fifteen UCI Women's WorldTeams, five UCI Women's ProTeams and four Women's continental teams.

UCI Women's WorldTeams

- AG Insurance–Soudal
- Canyon//SRAM Zondacrypto
- Ceratizit Pro Cycling
- FDJ–Suez
- Fenix–Deceuninck
- Human Powered Health
- Lidl–Trek
- Liv AlUla Jayco
- Movistar Team
- Roland
- Team Picnic–PostNL
- Team SD Worx–Protime
- UAE Team ADQ
- Uno-X Mobility
- Visma–Lease a Bike

UCI Women's ProTeams

- Arkéa–B&B Hotels Women
- Cofidis
- EF Education–Oatly
- St. Michel–Preference Home–Auber93
- VolkerWessels Cycling Team

UCI Women's Continental Teams

- DD Group Pro Cycling Team
- Lotto Ladies
- Team Coop–Repsol
- VELOPRO - Alphamotorhomes

== Result ==
Result
Rank	Rider	Team	Time
1	Lorena Wiebes (NED)	Team SD Worx–Protime	3h 42' 13"
2	Chiara Consonni (ITA)	Canyon//SRAM Zondacrypto	+ 0"
3	Elisa Balsamo (ITA)	Lidl–Trek	+ 0"
4	Georgia Baker (AUS)	Liv AlUla Jayco	+ 0"
5	Lara Gillespie (IRL)	UAE Team ADQ	+ 0"
6	Nienke Veenhoven (NED)	Visma–Lease a Bike	+ 0"
7	Linda Zanetti (SUI)	Uno-X Mobility	+ 0"
8	Valentine Fortin (FRA)	Cofidis	+ 0"
9	Mylène de Zoete (NED)	Ceratizit Pro Cycling	+ 0"
10	Kathrin Schweinberger (AUT)	Human Powered Health	+ 0"
