= 2026 Omloop Het Nieuwsblad (women's race) =

Cycling race

2026 UCI Women's World Tour, race 4 of 26
- Event poster with previous winner Lotte Claes

Race details
- Dates: 28 February 2026
- Stages: 1
- Distance: 137.2 km (85.3 mi)
- Winning time: 3h 35' 51"

Results
	Winner	Demi Vollering (NED)	(FDJ United–Suez)
	Second	Katarzyna Niewiadoma-Phinney (POL)	(Canyon//SRAM Zondacrypto)
	Third	Lorena Wiebes (NED)	(Team SD Worx–Protime)

The 2026 Omloop Het Nieuwsblad was the 21st edition of the Omloop Het Nieuwsblad road cycling one day race, which was held on 28 February 2026 as part of the 2026 UCI Women's World Tour calendar.

The race was won by Dutch rider Demi Vollering of FDJ United–Suez, after outsprinting Katarzyna Niewiadoma-Phinney.

== Teams ==
Fourteen UCI Women's WorldTeams, seven UCI Women's ProTeams, and two UCI Women's Continental Teams made up the twenty-three teams that participated in the race.

UCI Women's WorldTeams

- AG Insurance–Soudal
- Canyon//SRAM Zondacrypto
- EF Education–Oatly
- FDJ United–Suez
- Fenix–Premier Tech
- Human Powered Health
- Lidl–Trek
- Liv AlUla Jayco
- Movistar Team
- Team Picnic–PostNL
- Team SD Worx–Protime
- UAE Team ADQ
- Uno-X Mobility
- Visma–Lease a Bike

UCI Women's ProTeams

- Cofidis
- Laboral Kutxa–Fundación Euskadi
- Lotto–Intermarché Ladies
- Ma Petite Entreprise
- Mayenne Monbana My Pie
- St. Michel–Preference Home–Auber93
- VolkerWessels Cycling Team

UCI Women's Continental Teams

- Citymesh–Customm Pro Cycling Team
- Minimax Cycling Team

== Result ==
Final general classification
Rank	Rider	Team	Time
1	Demi Vollering (NED)	FDJ United–Suez	3h 35' 51"
2	Katarzyna Niewiadoma-Phinney (POL)	Canyon//SRAM Zondacrypto	+ 0"
3	Lorena Wiebes (NED)	Team SD Worx–Protime	+ 21"
4	Cat Ferguson (GBR)	Movistar Team	+ 21"
5	Franziska Koch (GER)	FDJ United–Suez	+ 21"
6	Karlijn Swinkels (NED)	UAE Team ADQ	+ 21"
7	Shari Bossuyt (BEL)	AG Insurance–Soudal	+ 21"
8	Millie Couzens (GBR)	Fenix–Premier Tech	+ 21"
9	Nina Berton (LUX)	EF Education–Oatly	+ 21"
10	Letizia Paternoster (ITA)	Liv AlUla Jayco	+ 21"
