= 2023 European Road Championships =

29th European Road Cycling Championships

- Location within Netherlands
- Venue: Drenthe, Netherlands
- Date: 20–24 September 2023
- Coordinates: 52°55′N 6°35′E
- Events: 14

The 2023 European Road Cycling Championships was the 29th running of the European Road Cycling Championships, that took place from 20 to 24 September 2023 in the province of Drenthe, Netherlands. The event consisted of a total of 6 road races and 8 time trials.

== Race schedule ==
All times are in CEST (UTC+2).

Date	Timings	Event	Distance
Time trial events
20 September	9:15	Junior Women	19.8 km (12.3 mi)
20 September	10:25	Junior Men	19.8 km (12.3 mi)
20 September	12:00	Under-23 Women	19.8 km (12.3 mi)
20 September	13:05	Under-23 Men	19.8 km (12.3 mi)
20 September	14:30	Elite Women	28.6 km (17.8 mi)
20 September	16:15	Elite Men	28.6 km (17.8 mi)
21 September	12:45	Mixed team relay junior	19.2 km (11.9 mi)
21 September	15:30	Mixed team relay elite	19.2 km (11.9 mi)
Road race events
22 September	9:30	Under-23 Men	134.9 km (83.8 mi)
22 September	14:30	Under-23 Women	106.4 km (66.1 mi)
23 September	9:00	Junior Men	109.3 km (67.9 mi)
23 September	13:45	Elite Women	129.6 km (80.5 mi)
24 September	09:00	Junior Women	68.2 km (42.4 mi)
24 September	12:15	Elite Men	199.8 km (124.1 mi)

== Medal summary ==
=== Elite ===
Event	Gold		Silver		Bronze	
Men's Elite Events
Road race	Christophe Laporte; France	4h 15' 50"	Wout van Aert; Belgium	s.t.	Olav Kooij; Netherlands	s.t.
Time trial	Josh Tarling; Great Britain	31:30.01	Stefan Bissegger; Switzerland	+ 42.92"	Wout van Aert; Belgium	+ 43.14"
Women's Elite Events
Road race	Mischa Bredewold; Netherlands	3h 4' 12"	Lorena Wiebes; Netherlands	+4"	Lotte Kopecky; Belgium	+4"
Time trial	Marlen Reusser; Switzerland	35:53.53	Anna Henderson; Great Britain	+ 43.36"	Christina Schweinberger; Austria	+ 44.05"

=== Under-23 ===
Event	Gold		Silver		Bronze	
Men's Under-23 Events
Road race	Henrik Breiner Pedersen; Denmark	3h 00' 12"	Iván Romeo; Spain	+ 25"	Paul Magnier; France	+ 37"
Time trial	Alec Segaert; Belgium	22:02.68	Carl-Frederik Bévort; Denmark	+ 37.60"	Gustav Wang; Denmark	+ 52.22"
Women's Under-23 Events
Road race	Ilse Pluimers; Netherlands	2h 46' 33"	Anna Shackley; Great Britain	+ 1"	Linda Zanetti; Switzerland	+ 1"
Time trial	Zoe Bäckstedt; Great Britain	24:25.89	Antonia Niedermaier; Germany	+ 57.51"	Anniina Ahtosalo; Finland	+ 1:33.47"

=== Junior ===
Event	Gold		Silver		Bronze	
Men's Junior Events
Road race	Anže Ravbar; Slovenia	2h 38' 50"	Matys Grisel; France	+ 2"	Žak Eržen; Slovenia	+ 2"
Time trial	Albert Philipsen; Denmark	22:48.68	Jørgen Nordhagen; Norway	+ 46.43"	Sente Sentjens; Belgium	+ 49.12"
Women's Junior Events
Road race	Fleur Moors; Belgium	1h 59' 45"	Federica Venturelli; Italy	+2"	Léane Tabu; France	+7"
Time trial	Federica Venturelli; Italy	26:23.87	Stina Kagevi; Sweden	+ 23.36"	Hannah Kunz; Germany	+ 32.99"

=== Mixed relay ===
Event	Gold		Silver		Bronze	
Elite team time trial	France; Bruno Armirail; Rémi Cavagna; Benjamin Thomas; Audrey Cordon-Ragot; Cédrine Kerbaol; Juliette Labous	44' 23.72"	Italy; Edoardo Affini; Mattia Cattaneo; Matteo Sobrero; Elena Cecchini; Vittoria Guazzini; Soraya Paladin	+ 5"	Germany; Miguel Heidemann; Jannik Steimle; Maximilian Walscheid; Lisa Klein; Franziska Koch; Mieke Kröger	+ 23"
Junior team time trial	Italy; Andrea Bessega; Luca Giaimi; Andrea Montagner; Eleonora La Bella; Alice Toniolli; Federica Venturelli	48' 14.15"	Germany; Moritz Bell; Ian Kings; Louis Leidert; Pia Grünewald; Hannah Kunz; Joelle Amelie Messemer	+ 26"	France; Léo Bisiaux; Eliott Boulet; Maxime Decomble; Julie Bego; Alice Bredard; Léane Tabu	+ 35"

== Medal table ==
* Host nation (Netherlands)

Rank	Nation	Gold	Silver	Bronze	Total
1	Great Britain (GBR)	2	2	0	4
1	Italy (ITA)	2	2	0	4
3	Belgium (BEL)	2	1	3	6
3	France (FRA)	2	1	3	6
5	Denmark (DEN)	2	1	1	4
5	Netherlands (NED)*	2	1	1	4
7	Switzerland (SWI)	1	1	1	3
8	Slovenia (SLO)	1	0	1	2
9	Germany (GER)	0	2	2	4
10	Norway (NOR)	0	1	0	1
10	Spain (ESP)	0	1	0	1
10	Sweden (SWE)	0	1	0	1
13	Austria (AUT)	0	0	1	1
13	Finland (FIN)	0	0	1	1
Totals (14 entries)		14	14	14	42
