= Dwars door de Westhoek =

Women's bicycle race

Race details
- Date: June
- Region: Boezinge, Belgium
- Discipline: Road
- Web site: www.sasspurtersboezinge.be

History
- First edition: 2007
- Editions: 19 (as of 2026)
- First winner: Emma Johansson (SWE)
- Most wins: Liesbet De Vocht (BEL) (2 wins)
- Most recent: Federica Venturelli (ITA)

Dwars door de Westhoek is an elite women's road bicycle race held annually in Roeselare, Belgium. The race is established in 2007 and is rated by the UCI as a 1.1 category race.

== Past winners ==
Year	Country	Rider	Team
2007	Sweden	Emma Johansson	Vlaanderen–Capri Sonne–T Interim
2008	Great Britain	Lizzie Armitstead	Team Halfords Bikehut
2009	Belgium	Liesbet De Vocht	DSB Bank - Nederland bloeit
2010	Belgium	Liesbet De Vocht	Nederland bloeit
2011	Netherlands	Grace Verbeke	Topsport Vlaanderen
2012	Netherlands	Kim de Baat	
2013	Belgium	Jolien D'Hoore	Lotto–Belisol Ladies
2014	Netherlands	Anna van der Breggen	Rabobank-Liv Woman Cycling Team
2015	France	Élise Delzenne	Velocio–SRAM
2016	Luxembourg	Christine Majerus	Boels–Dolmans
2017	Italy	Valentina Scandolara	WM3 Energie
2018	Vietnam	Nguyễn Thị Thật	UCI WCC Women's Team
2019	Italy	Elisa Balsamo	Valcar–Cylance
2020	No race		
2021	Netherlands	Lorena Wiebes	Team DSM
2022	Italy	Chiara Consonni	Valcar–Travel & Service
2023	Great Britain	Pfeiffer Georgi	Team DSM
2024	Austria	Kathrin Schweinberger	Ceratizit–WNT Pro Cycling
2025	Belgium	Fleur Moors	Lidl–Trek
2026	Italy	Federica Venturelli	UAE Team ADQ
