= Lorena Wiebes =

Dutch cyclist (born 1999)

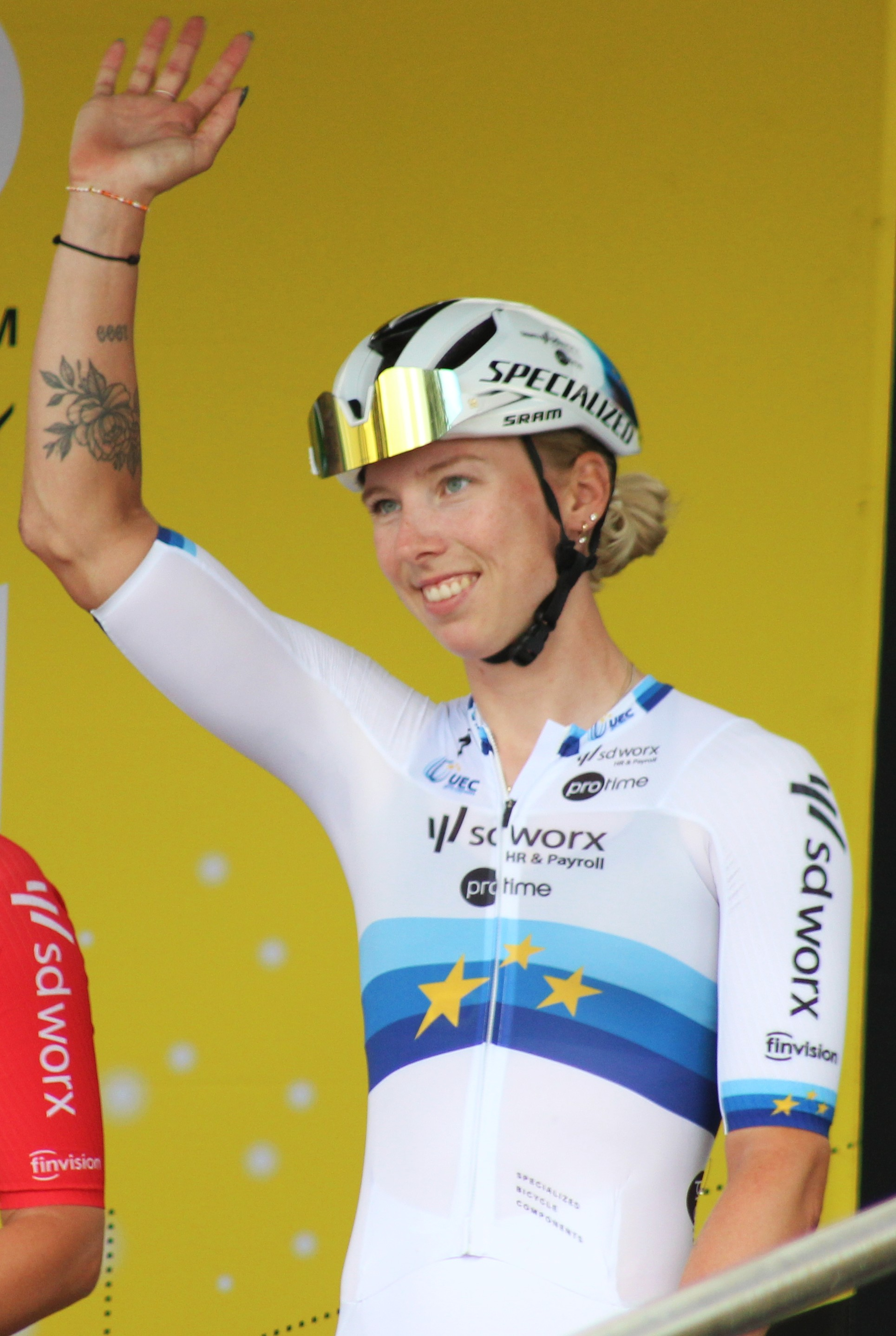
- Wiebes at the 2025 Tour de France Femmes

Personal information
- Full name: Lorena Wiebes
- Born: 17 March 1999 (age 27) Mijdrecht, Netherlands
- Height: 1.71 m (5 ft 7 in)
- Weight: 60 kg (132 lb)

Cycling career
- Sport: Cycling
- Current team: Team SD Worx–Protime
- Discipline: Road
- Role: Rider
- Rider type: Sprinter

Amateur team
- 2017: Swaboladies.nl

Professional teams
- 2018–2020: Parkhotel Valkenburg
- 2020–2022: Team Sunweb
- 2023–: SD Worx

Major wins
- Gravel World Championships (2025) European Championships (2023) Road Major Tours Tour de France Points classification (2025, 2026) 7 individual stages (2022, 2023, 2025, 2026) Giro d'Italia Points classification (2025) 5 individual stages (2021, 2023, 2025) One-day races and Classics European Road Race Championships (2022, 2024) National Road Race Championships (2019, 2025) Milan–San Remo (2025) Gent–Wevelgem (2024, 2025, 2026) Ronde van Drenthe (2021, 2022, 2023, 2024) Nokere Koerse (2019, 2022) Classic Brugge–De Panne (2020, 2025) Omloop van het Hageland (2020, 2023) Scheldeprijs (2021, 2022, 2023, 2024) Track World Championships Omnium (2025) Scratch (2024, 2025, 2026)
Medal record
Representing the Netherlands
Women's road bicycle racing
European Games
Gold medal – first place	2019 Minsk	Road race
European Championships
Gold medal – first place	2022 Munich	Road race
Gold medal – first place	2024 Belgian Limburg	Road race
Silver medal – second place	2023 Drenthe	Road race
Women's gravel bicycle racing
World Championships
Gold medal – first place	2025 South Limburg	Elite
Bronze medal – third place	2024 Flemish Brabant	Elite
European Championships
Gold medal – first place	2023 Oud-Heverlee	Elite
Women's track cycling
World Championships
Gold medal – first place	2024 Ballerup	Scratch
Gold medal – first place	2025 Santiago	Scratch
Gold medal – first place	2025 Santiago	Omnium
Gold medal – first place	2026 Shanghai	Scratch
European Championships
Gold medal – first place	2025 Heusden-Zolder	Omnium
Silver medal – second place	2025 Heusden-Zolder	Scratch

Lorena Wiebes (born 17 March 1999) is a Dutch racing cyclist, who currently rides for UCI Women's WorldTeam Team SD Worx–Protime.

== Career ==
=== Road ===
On the road, Wiebes turned professional in 2018, riding for Parkhotel Valkenburg. In 2019, she became Dutch National Road Race champion. She won the gold medal in the road race at the 2019 European Games, beating her compatriot Marianne Vos in the sprint for the line. In 2020, she joined Team Sunweb. She won the road race at the European Road Cycling Championships in 2022 and 2024. In 2022, she won two stages at the Tour de France Femmes, but later crashed out of the race. In August 2022, it was announced that Wiebes had signed a 3-year contract with SD Worx. In 2023, she won another stage at the Tour de France Femmes, but again did not finish the race. In 2024, her contract with Team SD Worx–Protime was extended to the end of 2028. In 2025, Wiebes won her first cycling monument, winning Milan–San Remo Women. In March 2025, she won her 100th race victory at Gent–Wevelgem.

=== Track ===
On the track, Wiebes became world champion in the scratch race at the 2024 UCI Track Cycling World Championships, and European champion in the Omnium at the 2025 UEC European Track Championships.

=== Gravel ===
In 2024, Wiebes finished 3rd at the 2024 UCI Gravel World Championships. In 2025, Wiebes won the UCI Gravel World Championships.

== Major results ==
=== Road ===
2016
1st Road race, National Junior Championships
2017
1st Road race, UEC European Junior Championships
1st Overall Healthy Ageing Tour Juniors

1st Points classification
1st Stages 2 & 4

Junior EPZ Omloop van Borsele

1st Sprints classification
1st Stage 3

1st Piccolo Trofeo Alfredo Binda
3rd Gent–Wevelgem Juniors
2018
1st GP Sofie Goos
1st Salverda Omloop van de IJsseldelta
1st Rabobank 7-Dorpenomloop Aalburg
BeNe Ladies Tour

1st Points classification
1st Stage 2a

2nd Dwars door de Westhoek
2nd Omloop van de Westhoek
3rd Gran Premio Bruno Beghelli
3rd Veenendaal–Veenendaal Classic
3rd Flanders Ladies Classic
3rd Trofee Maarten Wynants
4th Three Days of Bruges–De Panne
8th Gooik-Geraardsbergen-Gooik
8th Le Samyn
9th Road race, UEC European Championships
10th Drentse Acht van Westerveld
2019
1st Road race, European Games
1st Road race, National Championships
1st Overall Tour of Chongming Island

1st Points classification
1st Young rider classification
1st Stages 1, 2 & 3

1st Nokere Koerse voor Dames
1st EPZ Omloop van Borsele
1st RideLondon Classique
1st Flanders Diamond Tour
1st Stage 1 Tour de Yorkshire
2nd Overall Boels Ladies Tour

1st Points classification
1st Young rider classification
1st Stages 1 & 2

2nd Gent–Wevelgem
2nd Three Days of Bruges–De Panne
2nd Gran Premio Bruno Beghelli
2nd Dwars door de Westhoek
3rd Vårgårda WestSweden Road Race
4th Road race, UEC European Championships
5th Overall Tour of Norway

1st Young rider classification
1st Stage 1

5th Salverda Omloop van de IJsseldelta
8th Overall BeNe Ladies Tour

1st Points classification
1st Stage 3

9th Overall Healthy Ageing Tour

1st Young rider classification

9th Drentse Acht van Westerveld
2020
1st Three Days of Bruges–De Panne
1st Omloop van het Hageland
1st Grote Prijs Euromat
3rd Overall Challenge by La Vuelta

1st Young rider classification
1st Stage 1

2021
1st Ronde van Drenthe
1st Scheldeprijs
1st GP Eco-Struct
1st Dwars door de Westhoek
1st Flanders Diamond Tour
The Women's Tour

1st Points classification
1st Stages 4 & 5

Giro Rosa

1st Stages 5 & 8

Thüringen Ladies Tour

1st Stages 2 & 6

1st Prologue Festival Elsy Jacobs
3rd Overall Belgium Tour

1st Young rider classification
1st Stage 1

3rd Dwars door het Hageland
5th Nokere Koerse
2022
1st Road race, UEC European Championships
1st Overall RideLondon Classique

1st Points classification
1st Stages 1, 2 & 3

1st Overall Holland Ladies Tour

1st Points classification
1st Stage 2

The Women's Tour

1st Points classification
1st Stages 2, 3 & 6

Tour de France

1st Stages 1 & 5
Held & after Stage 1

1st Ronde van Drenthe
1st Binche–Chimay–Binche
1st Nokere Koerse
1st Scheldeprijs
1st GP Oetingen
2nd Overall Baloise Ladies Tour

1st Points classification
1st Stages 1, 2, 3a & 4

2nd Classic Brugge–De Panne
3rd Road race, National Championships
3rd Omloop Het Nieuwsblad
3rd GP Eco-Struct
4th Overall AG Tour de la Semois

1st Stage 2

10th Omloop van het Hageland
2023
1st Omloop van het Hageland
1st Ronde van Drenthe
1st Scheldeprijs
Vuelta a Burgos

1st Points classification
1st Stages 1 & 2

1st Stage 3 Tour de France
1st Stage 2 UAE Tour
2nd Road race, UEC European Championships
2nd Omloop Het Nieuwsblad
2nd Nokere Koerse
3rd Classic Brugge–De Panne
2024
1st Road race, UEC European Championships
1st Overall RideLondon Classique

1st Points classification
1st Stages 1, 2 & 3

1st GP Oetingen
1st Ronde van Drenthe
1st Gent–Wevelgem
1st Scheldeprijs
2nd Amstel Gold Race
2nd Nokere Koerse
4th Overall Simac Ladies Tour

1st Points classification
1st Stages 2, 3 & 5

7th Paris–Roubaix
2025
1st Road race, National Championships
1st Milan–San Remo
1st Classic Brugge–De Panne
1st Gent–Wevelgem
1st Copenhagen Sprint
1st Le Samyn
1st Dwars door het Hageland
1st GP Lucien Van Impe
Tour de France

1st Points classification
1st Stages 3 & 4

Giro d'Italia

1st Points classification
1st Stages 3 & 5

UAE Tour

1st Points classification
1st Stages 1, 2 & 4

1st Stage 4 Tour of Britain
3rd Paris–Roubaix
5th Omloop Het Nieuwsblad
6th Amstel Gold Race
2026
1st Overall Tour de Pologne

1st Stages 1, 2 & 3

1st Copenhagen Sprint
Tour de France

1st Points classification
1st Stages 1 & 2
Held after Stages 1–2

Vuelta a Burgos

1st Points classification
1st Stages 1 & 2

Tour of Britain

1st Points classification
1st Stages 1, 2, 4 & 5

3rd Omloop Het Nieuwsblad
6th Milan–San Remo
6th Paris–Roubaix
9th Tour of Bruges

==== General classification results timeline ====
Stage race	2018	2019	2020	2021	2022	2023	2024	2025	2026
La Vuelta Femenina (Note: Known as the Challenge by La Vuelta from 2020 to 2022)	34	—	3	—	—	—	—	—	—
Giro d'Italia Femminile	—	—	—	48	—	DNF	—	61	DNF
Tour de France Femmes	Race did not exist				DNF	DNF	62	96	65

==== Classics results timeline ====
Monuments	2019	2020	2021	2022	2023	2024	2025	2026
Milan–San Remo	Not held						1	6
Tour of Flanders	—	—	—	DNF	14	11	17	DNF
Paris–Roubaix	DNE		DNF	45	49	7	3	6
Liège–Bastogne–Liège	Has not contested during her career							
Classic	2019	2020	2021	2022	2023	2024	2025	2026
Omloop Het Nieuwsblad	DNF	22	42	3	2	9	5	3
Omloop van het Hageland	18	1	—	10	1	11	—	—
Strade Bianche	—	—	—	—	—	—	DNF	—
Ronde van Drenthe	DNF	NH	1	1	1	1	NH	NH
Trofeo Alfredo Binda	—	NH	—	—	18	—	—	—
Classic Brugge–De Panne	2	1	13	—	3	—	1	9
Gent–Wevelgem	2	11	62	DNF	DNF	1	1	1
Scheldeprijs	Not held		1	1	1	1	—	—
Amstel Gold Race	27	NH	DNF	—	46	2	6	DNF
La Flèche Wallonne	—	—	—	—	—	—	79	—
Copenhagen Sprint	Not held						1	1

==== Major championship results timeline ====
Event		2018	2019	2020	2021	2022	2023	2024	2025
Olympic Games	Road race	Not held			—	Not held		11	NH
World Championships	Road race	—	—	—	—	—	DNF	—	—
World Championships	Team time trial	12	Not held						
European Championships	Road race	9	4	DNF	—	1	2	1	—
European Games	Road race	NH	1	Not held					
National Championships	Road race	9	1	17	7	3	2	15	1

Legend
—	Did not compete
DNF	Did not finish
NH	Not held

=== Gravel ===
2023
2nd UEC European Championships (Note: The European Championship race was won by Tiffany Cromwell however, due to her Australian nationality was ineligible to receive the European champions jersey. As a result, the jersey was passed to Lorena Wiebes who finished in second place)
2024
3rd UCI World Championships
2025
1st UCI World Championships
UCI World Series

1st Valkenburg

=== Track ===
2016
National Junior Championships

1st Scratch
2nd Sprint
3rd 500m time trial

2017
3rd Scratch, National Championships
2018
National Championships

2nd Omnium
3rd Scratch

2019
National Championships

1st Scratch
3rd Keirin

2021
3rd Madison, National Championships
2024
1st Scratch, UCI World Championships
2025
UCI World Championships

1st Omnium
1st Scratch

2nd Scratch, UEC European Championships
2026
1st Scratch, UCI World Championships
