= Christina Schweinberger =

Austrian cyclist (born 1996)

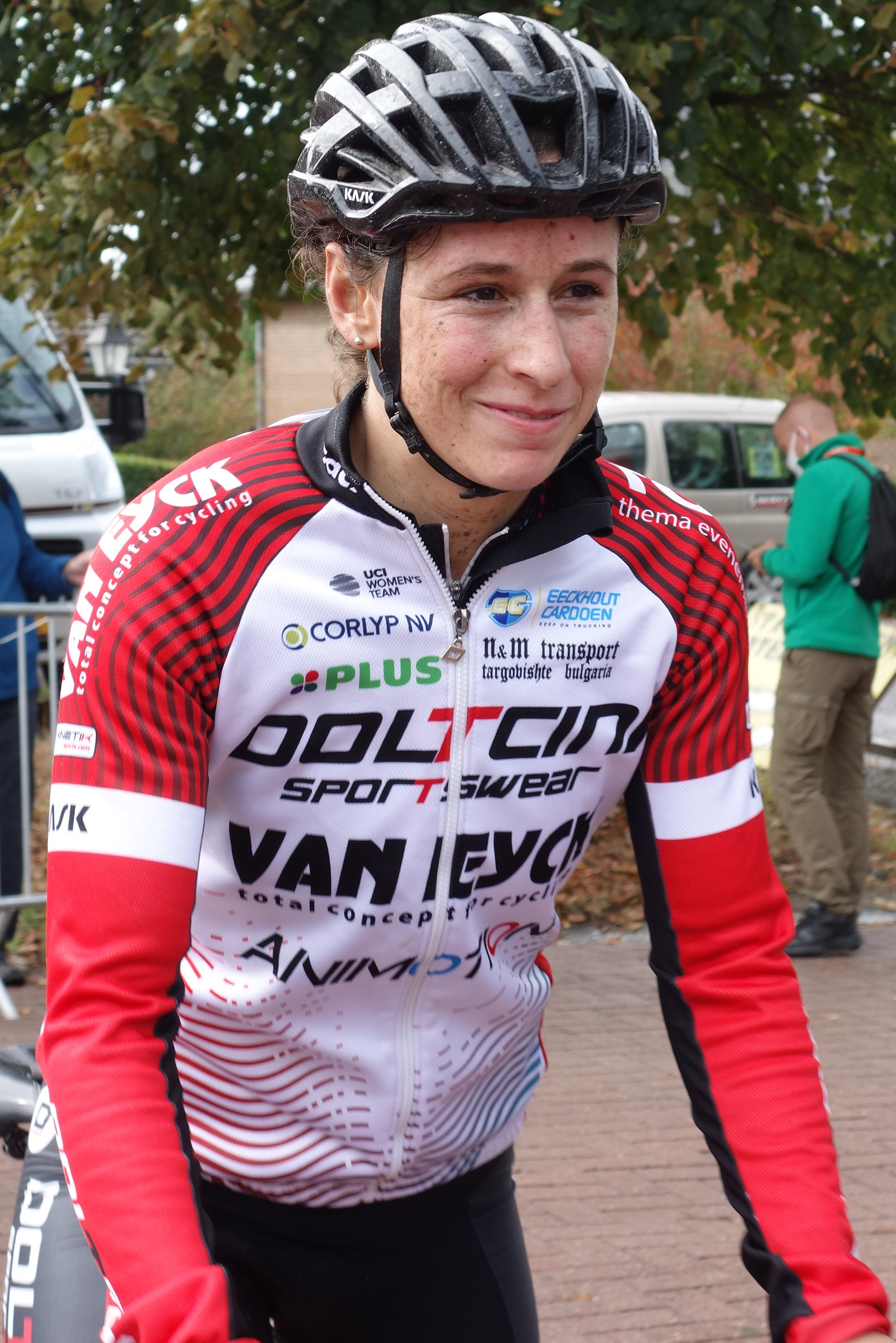
- Schweinberger in 2020

Personal information
- Full name: Christina Schweinberger
- Born: 29 October 1996 (age 29)

Cycling career
- Sport: Cycling
- Current team: Fenix–Premier Tech
- Discipline: Road
- Role: Rider

Professional teams
- 2018–2019: Health Mate–Cyclelive Team
- 2020: Doltcini–Van Eyck Sport
- 2022–: Plantur–Pura
Medal record
Women's road bicycle racing
Representing Austria
World Championships
Bronze medal – third place	2023 Stirling	Time trial
European Championships
Bronze medal – third place	2023 Drenthe	Time trial
Bronze medal – third place	2024 Limburg	Time trial

Christina Schweinberger (born 29 October 1996) is an Austrian professional racing cyclist, who currently rides for UCI Women's WorldTeam Fenix–Premier Tech. The Ceratizit Challenge by La Vuelta was the first international race where she gained over 10 UCI points. The following year she won her first international medal in Beerens.

In 2022 the Tyrolese participated in the Tour de France Femmes and the European Championships. She also won the National Road Championships, defeating 2021 Olympic champion Anna Kiesenhofer among others, and her first international race that year. Her twin sister Kathrin Schweinberger is also a professional cyclist. Before cycling, they devoted themselves to Judo.

== Major results ==
2017
8th Road race, National Road Championships
2018
7th Road race, National Road Championships
2019
National Road Championships

5th Time trial
7th Road race

2020
National Road Championships

3rd Time trial
4th Road race

2021
2nd Grote Prijs Beerens
3rd Road race, National Road Championships
2021
2nd Grote Prijs Beerens
National Road Championships

3rd Road race
3rd Time trial

4th Binche Chimay Binche
5th Team relay, UEC European Road Championships
2022
National Road Championships

1st Road race
1st Time trial

2nd Dwars door het Hageland
3rd Overall Gracia Orlová

1st Stage 3a (ITT)

4th Chrono des Nations (ITT)
6th Dwars door de Westhoek
UEC European Championships

8th Time trial
10th Road race

2023
National Road Championships

2nd Time trial
4th Road race

2nd Dwars door het Hageland
2nd Chrono des Nations
2nd Binche–Chimay–Binche
3rd UCI Road World Championships – Women's time trial
3rd Time trial, UEC European Road Championships
5th UCI Road World Championships – Women's road race
5th Overall Thüringen Ladies Tour
5th Gent–Wevelgem
6th Classic Lorient Agglomération
7th Overall Simac Ladies Tour
7th Classic Brugge–De Panne
7th Grand Prix de Wallonie
8th Omloop Het Nieuwsblad
9th UCI Road World Championships – Mixed team relay
9th Flanders Diamond Tour
2024
National Road Championships

2nd Time trial
3rd Road race

2nd Binche Chimay Binche
3rd Time trial, UEC European Road Championships
3rd Le Samyn
4th Omloop van het Hageland
6th UCI Road World Championships – Women's time trial
6th Dwars door het Hageland
7th Ronde van Drenthe
9th Gent–Wevelgem
10th UCI Road World Championships – Mixed team relay
10th Time trial, Olympic Games
10th Flanders Diamond Tour
2025
6th Le Samyn
