= Nienke Veenhoven =

Dutch cyclist (born 2004)

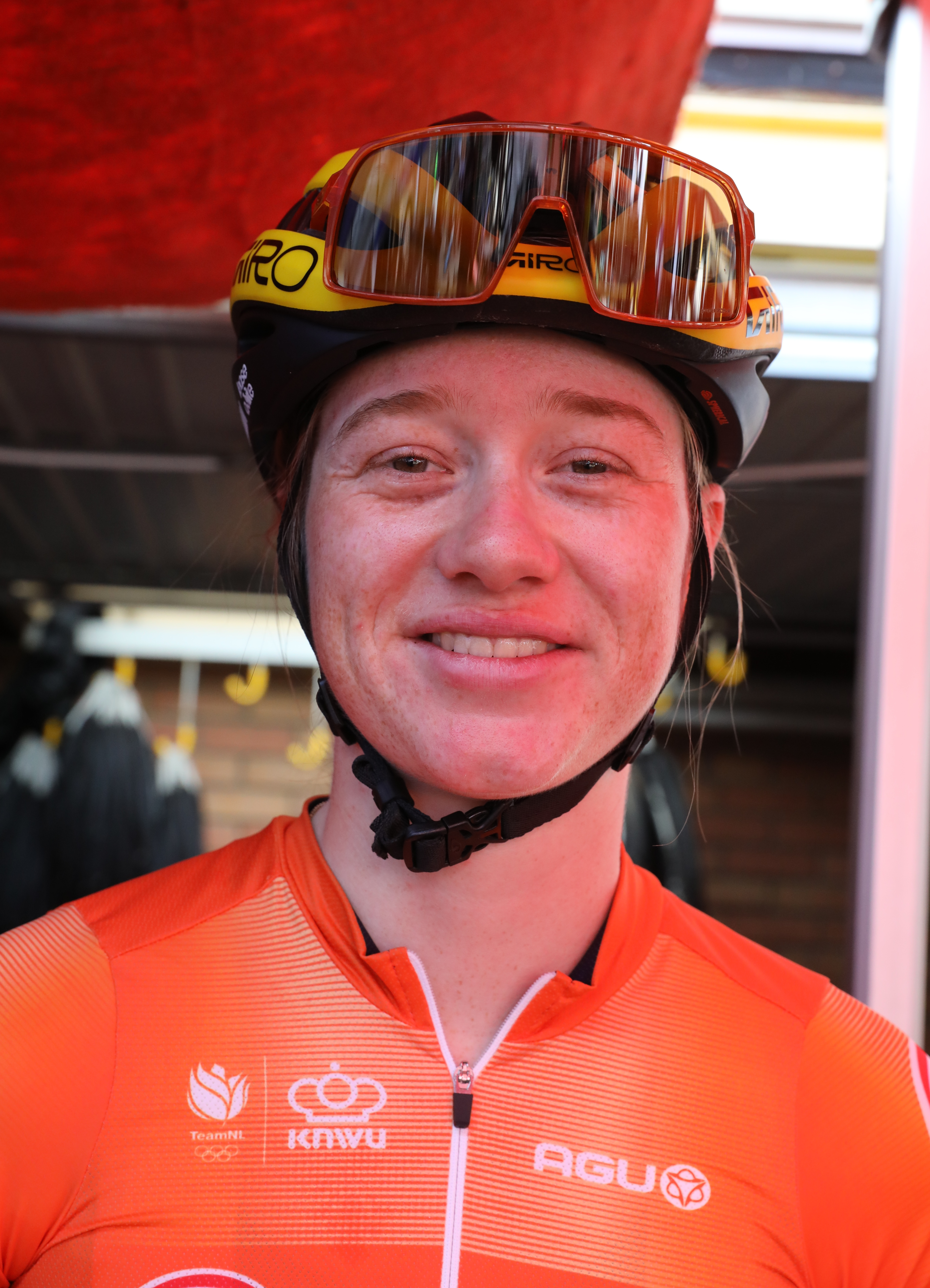
- Veenhoven in 2024

Personal information
- Born: 20 March 2004 (age 22) Oostzaan, Netherlands

Cycling career
- Sport: Cycling
- Current team: Visma–Lease a Bike
- Disciplines: Road; Track
- Role: Rider
- Rider type: Sprinter

Amateur team
- 2021–2022: NXTG U19

Professional team
- 2023–: Team Jumbo–Visma

Nienke Veenhoven (born 20 March 2004) is a Dutch road and track cyclist, who currently rides for UCI Women's WorldTeam Visma–Lease a Bike.

== Major results ==
=== Track ===
2024
2nd Scratch, European Under-23 Championships

=== Road ===
2021
National Junior Championships

4th Road race
8th Time trial

2022
1st Gent-Wevelgem Juniors
1st Points classification Tour du Gévaudan Occitanie
National Junior Championships

3rd Road race
6th Time trial

7th Overall Omloop van Borsele
2023
10th Omloop van Borsele
2024
3rd Egmont Cycling Race
4th Flanders Diamond Tour
4th Konvert Koerse
6th Trofee Maarten Wynants
8th Veenendaal–Veenendaal
8th La Choralis Fourmies Féminine
9th Overall Princess Anna Vasa Tour

1st Stage 1 (TTT)

10th Scheldeprijs
2025
5th Copenhagen Sprint
6th Classic Brugge–De Panne Women
2026
1st Points classification Baloise Ladies Tour

1st Stages 1, 3b & 4

3rd Tour of Bruges Women
3rd Copenhagen Sprint
