= Linda Zanetti =

Swiss cyclist (born 2002)

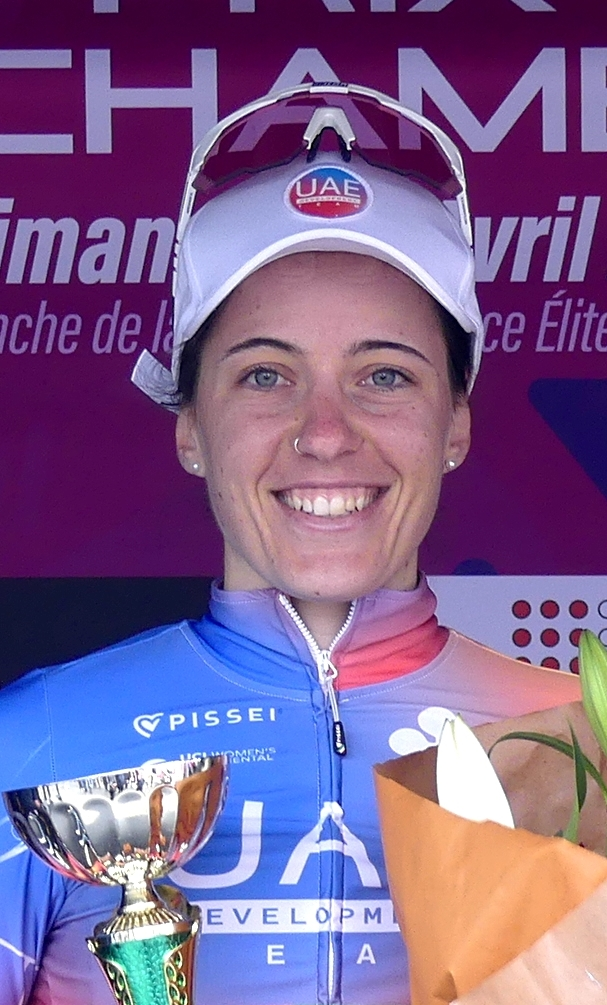
- Zanetti in 2023

Personal information
- Born: 10 March 2002 (age 24) Camignolo, Switzerland
- Height: 1.6 m (5 ft 3 in)

Cycling career
- Sport: Cycling
- Current team: Uno-X Mobility
- Disciplines: Road; Track
- Role: Rider

Professional teams
- 2022: UAE Team ADQ
- 2023: UAE Development Team
- 2024: Human Powered Health
- 2025–: Uno-X Mobility
Medal record
Women's road bicycle racing
Representing Switzerland
European Championships
Bronze medal – third place	2023 Drenthe	Under-23 road race

Linda Zanetti (born 10 March 2002) is a Swiss professional racing cyclist, who currently rides for UCI Women's WorldTeam Uno-X Mobility.

Zanetti turned professional in 2022 with UAE Team ADQ, but moved down to their development squad the following season. However, she still had a successful season, winning five races in 2023, including the Omloop van Borsele and a stage of Gracia–Orlová. She also won the bronze medal at the European Under-23 Road Race Championships.

In 2024, she moved to Human Powered Health, taking an early season podium at the Clásica de Almería in Spain.

== Major results ==
2020
National Junior Road Championships

2nd Road race
3rd Time trial

2022
2nd Time trial, National Under-23 Road Championships
2023
National Under-23 Road Championships

1st Road race
2nd Time trial

1st Omloop van Borsele
1st Respect Ladies Race Slovakia
1st Stage 2 Gracia–Orlová
1st Stage 2 Tour de l'Avenir
1st Stage 1b (TTT) Trofeo Ponente in Rosa
3rd Road race, European Under-23 Road Championships
5th Road race, National Road Championships
6th Overall Tour de la Semois
7th Grand Prix de Chambéry
2024
National Under-23 Road Championships

1st Road race
2nd Time trial

2nd Road race, National Road Championships
3rd Clásica de Almería
9th Women Cycling Pro Costa De Almería
2025
1st Vuelta CV Feminas
2nd Clásica de Almería
2nd Le Samyn
4th Trofeo Marratxi-Felanitx
7th Classic Brugge–De Panne Women
2026
4th Copenhagen Sprint
