= 2024 European Road Championships =

30th European Road Cycling Championships

- Location within Belgium
- Venue: Limburg, Belgium
- Date: 11–15 September 2024
- Coordinates: 50°36′N 5°56′E
- Events: 14

The 2024 European Road Cycling Championships was the 30th running of the European Road Cycling Championships, which took place from 11 to 15 September 2024 in the province of Limburg, Belgium. The event consisted of a total of 6 road races, 6 time trials, and 2 relays

== Race schedule ==
All times are in CEST (UTC+2).

Date	Timings	Event	Distance
Time trial events
11 September	9:00	Junior Women	13.3 km (8.3 mi)
11 September	10:15	Junior Men	31.2 km (19.4 mi)
11 September	11:45	Under-23 Women	31.2 km (19.4 mi)
11 September	13:15	Under-23 Men	31.2 km (19.4 mi)
11 September	15:00	Elite Women	31.2 km (19.4 mi)
11 September	16:30	Elite Men	31.2 km (19.4 mi)
12 September	11:30	Mixed team relay junior	52.3 km (32.5 mi)
12 September	14:20	Mixed team relay elite	52.3 km (32.5 mi)
Road race events
13 September	9:00	Under-23 Women	101.4 km (63.0 mi)
13 September	13:30	Under-23 Men	162.0 km (100.7 mi)
14 September	9:00	Junior Men	129.7 km (80.6 mi)
14 September	13:30	Elite Women	162.0 km (100.7 mi)
15 September	09:00	Junior Women	72.9 km (45.3 mi)
15 September	12:30	Elite Men	222.8 km (138.4 mi)

== Medal summary ==
=== Elite ===
Event	Gold		Silver		Bronze	
Men's Elite Events
Road race	Tim Merlier; Belgium	4h 37' 09"	Olav Kooij; Netherlands	s.t.	Madis Mihkels; Estonia	s.t.
Time trial	Edoardo Affini; Italy	35:15.471	Stefan Küng; Switzerland	+9.59"	Mattia Cattaneo; Italy	+19.66"
Women's Elite Events
Road race	Lorena Wiebes; Netherlands	3h 56' 34"	Elisa Balsamo; Italy	s.t.	Daria Pikulik; Poland	s.t.
Time trial	Lotte Kopecky; Belgium	39:00.791	Ellen van Dijk; Netherlands	+43.60"	Christina Schweinberger; Austria	+1:02.97"

=== Under-23 ===
Event	Gold		Silver		Bronze	
Men's Under-23 Events
Road race	Huub Artz; Netherlands	3h 22' 33"	Niklas Behrens; Germany	+ 0"	Léandre Lozouet; France	+ 11"
Time trial	Alec Segaert; Belgium	35:06.325	Jakob Söderqvist; Sweden	+30.82"	Wessel Mouris; Netherlands	+34.56"
Women's Under-23 Events
Road race	Sofie van Rooijen; Netherlands	2h 26' 21"	Scarlett Souren; Netherlands	+ 0"	Eleonora Gasparrini; Italy	+ 0"
Time trial	Anniina Ahtosalo; Finland	40:54.782	Antonia Niedermaier; Germany	+29.09"	Marie Schreiber; Luxembourg	+31.96"

=== Junior ===
Event	Gold		Silver		Bronze	
Men's Junior Events
Road race	Felix Ørn-Kristoff; Norway	2h 40' 40"	Héctor Álvarez; Spain	+ 0"	Paul Seixas; France	+ 0"
Time trial	Michiel Mouris; Netherlands	37:08.609	Jasper Schoofs; Belgium	+7.03"	Paul Fietzke; Germany	+23.99"
Women's Junior Events
Road race	Puck Langenbarg; Netherlands	1h 43' 15"	Messane Bräutigam; Germany	+ 0"	Stepanka Dubcová; Czech Republic	+ 0"
Time trial	Paula Ostiz Taco; Spain	17:52.317	Fee Knaven; Netherlands	+ 1.38"	Viktória Chladoňová; Slovakia	+10.81"

=== Mixed relay ===
Event	Gold		Silver		Bronze	
Elite team time trial	Italy; Edoardo Affini; Mattia Cattaneo; Mirco Maestri; Elena Cecchini; Vittoria Guazzini; Gaia Masetti	1h 01' 43.16"	Germany; Nils Politt; Jannik Steimle; Maximilian Walscheid; Lisa Klein; Franziska Koch; Mieke Kröger	+ 17.24"	Belgium; Edward Theuns; Noah Vandenbranden; Victor Vercouillie; Alana Castrique; Marion Norbert-Riberolle; Jesse Vandenbulcke	+ 1:32.99"
Junior team time trial	Netherlands; Michiel Mouris; Joeri Schaper; Gijs Schoonvelde; Jente Koops; Roos Müller; Sara Sonnemans	1h 05' 20.92"	Germany; Paul Fietzke; Ian Kings; Paul-Felix Petry; Messane Bräutigam; Magdalena Leis; Joelle Amelie Messemer	+ 12.11"	Norway; Marius Innhaug Dahl; Andreas Flaatten; Felix Ørn-Kristoff; Kamilla Aasebø; Mia Gjertsen; Matilde Skjelde	+ 22.48"

== Medal table ==
* Host nation (Belgium)

Rank	Nation	Gold	Silver	Bronze	Total
1	Netherlands (NED)	6	4	1	11
2	Belgium (BEL)*	3	1	1	5
3	Italy (ITA)	2	1	2	5
4	Spain (ESP)	1	1	0	2
5	Norway (NOR)	1	0	1	2
6	Finland (FIN)	1	0	0	1
7	Germany (GER)	0	5	1	6
8	Sweden (SWE)	0	1	0	1
8	Switzerland (SUI)	0	1	0	1
10	France (FRA)	0	0	2	2
11	Austria (AUT)	0	0	1	1
11	Czech Republic (CZE)	0	0	1	1
11	Estonia (EST)	0	0	1	1
11	Luxembourg (LUX)	0	0	1	1
11	Poland (POL)	0	0	1	1
11	Slovakia (SVK)	0	0	1	1
Totals (16 entries)		14	14	14	42
