= Flanders Diamond Tour =

Belgian bicycle race

Race details
- Date: June
- Region: Belgium
- Discipline: Road
- Web site: flandersdiamondtour.be

History
- First edition: 2014
- Editions: 9 (as of 2023)
- First winner: Jolien D'Hoore (BEL)
- Most wins: Jolien D'Hoore (BEL) (3 wins)
- Most recent: Julie De Wilde (BEL)

The Spar Flanders Diamond Tour is a women's professional one-day road bicycle race held in Belgium. It is currently rated by the Union Cycliste Internationale (UCI) as a 1.1 race, after originally debuting as a 1.2 race.

== Past winners ==
Year	Country	Rider	Team
2014	Belgium	Jolien D'Hoore	Lotto–Belisol Ladies
2015	Belgium	Jolien D'Hoore	Wiggle–Honda
2016	Belgium	Jolien D'Hoore	Wiggle High5
2017	Netherlands	Nina Kessler	Team Hitec Products
2018	Netherlands	Janine van der Meer	Health Mate–Cyclelive Team
2019	Netherlands	Lorena Wiebes	Parkhotel Valkenburg
2020	No race due to the COVID-19 pandemic in Belgium		
2021	Netherlands	Lorena Wiebes	Team DSM
2022	Italy	Chiara Consonni	Valcar–Travel & Service
2023	Belgium	Julie De Wilde	Fenix–Deceuninck
2024	Italy	Chiara Consonni	UAE Team ADQ
