= Karlijn Swinkels =

Dutch cyclist

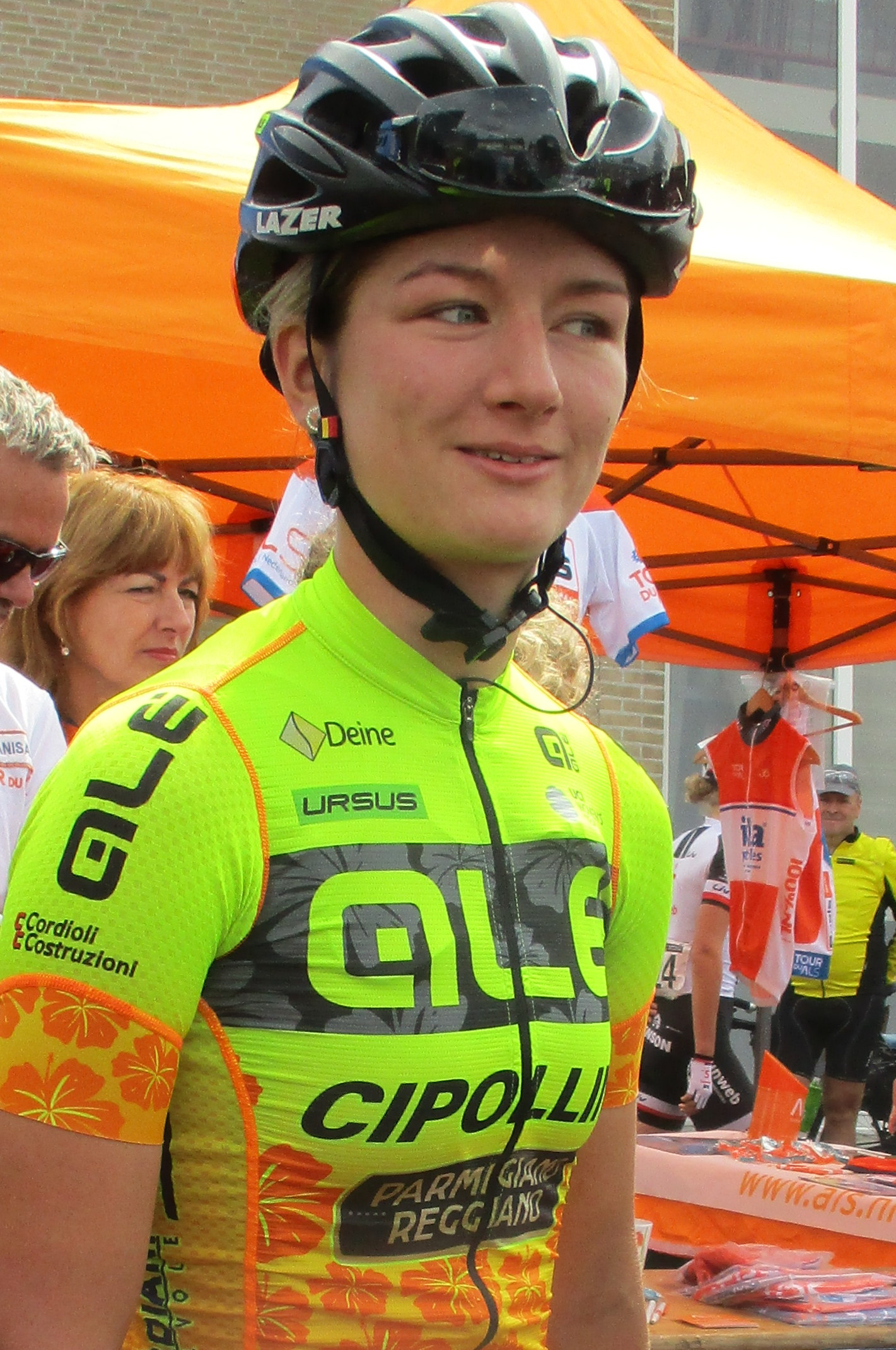
- Swinkels at the 2018 Holland Ladies Tour

Personal information
- Full name: Karlijn Swinkels
- Born: 28 October 1998 (age 27) Handel, Netherlands

Cycling career
- Sport: Cycling
- Current team: UAE Team L'Imad
- Discipline: Road
- Role: Rider

Professional teams
- 2017: Parkhotel Valkenburg–Destil
- 2018–2019: Alé–Cipollini
- 2020: Parkhotel Valkenburg
- 2021–2023: Team Jumbo–Visma
- 2024–: UAE Team ADQ

Karlijn Swinkels (born 28 October 1998) is a Dutch road cyclist, who currently rides for UCI Women's WorldTeam UAE Team L'Imad.

As a junior, she competed at 2015 UCI Road World Championships in the women's junior road race (15th) and at the 2016 European Road Championships in both the junior time trial (6th) and road race (33rd). At the 2016 UCI Road World Championships she became world champion in the women's junior time trial event.

== Major results ==
2015
National Junior Road Championships

3rd Road race
3rd Time trial

3rd National Junior Cyclo–cross Championships
2016
1st Time trial, UCI World Junior Road Championships
2nd Time trial, National Junior Road Championships
2nd Overall Albstadt-Frauen-Etappenrennen
3rd Overall Energiewacht Tour Juniors
6th Time trial, UEC European Junior Road Championships
10th Gent–Wevelgem Juniors
2018
7th Time trial, UEC European Under–23 Road Championships
10th Team time trial, UCI World Road Championships
2019
1st Stage 1 Vuelta a Burgos Feminas
9th Postnord UCI WWT Vårgårda WestSweden TTT
2020
5th Grand Prix International d'Isbergues
7th Time trial, UEC European Under–23 Road Championships
2021
3rd Road race, National Road Championships
4th Overall Festival Elsy Jacobs
2022
2nd Veenendaal–Veenendaal
3rd Overall Holland Ladies Tour
4th Postnord Vårgårda WestSweden TTT
National Road Championships

5th Time trial
9th Road race

6th Overall Grand Prix Elsy Jacobs
10th Dwars door Vlaanderen
2023
1st Overall Tour de la Semois

1st stage 1 & 2
1st Points classification

4th Gent-Wevelgem
5th Clasica Femenina Navarra
7th Classic Lorient Agglomération
8th Ronde van Drenthe
8th Overall Holland Ladies Tour

1st Mountains classification

2024
1st Grand Prix de Wallonie
1st Points classification Thüringen Ladies Tour
1st Overall AG Tour de la Semois

1st Points classification

2nd Trofeo Oro in Euro
3rd Overall Vuelta a Burgos Feminas
3rd Dwars door het Hageland
4th Le Samyn Des Dames
4th Kreiz Breizh Elites
5th Classic Lorient Agglomération
6th Trofeo Alfredo Binda-Comune di Cittiglio
6th Overall Holland Ladies Tour
10th Time trial, National Road Championships
2025
1st Trofeo Oro in Euro
2nd Cadel Evans Great Ocean Road Race
2nd La Périgord Ladies
2nd Grand Prix de Wallonie
5th Overall UAE Tour Women
6th Surf Coast Classic
8th La Picto–Charentaise
2026
1st Challenge Mallorca Femenina | Trofeo Binissalem-Andratx
1st Trofeo Alfredo Binda-Comune di Cittiglio
1st Grand Prix de Wallonie
2nd Trofeo Oro in Euro
3rd In Flanders Fields (Wevelgem-Wevelgem)
5th Challenge Mallorca Femenina | Trofeo Marratxi-Felanitx
5th Challenge Mallorca Femenina | Trofeo Llucmajor
6th Omloop Het Nieuwsblad
6th Tour of Flanders
9th Dwars door Vlaanderen
