= Kaja Rysz =

Polish cyclist

Personal information
- Born: 10 April 1999 (age 27) Rymanów-Zdrój, Poland

Cycling career
- Sport: Cycling
- Current team: Roland Le Dévoluy
- Discipline: Road
- Role: Rider

Amateur team
- 2021: Mat Atom Deweloper

Professional teams
- 2022: ATOM Deweloper Posciellux.pl Wrocław
- 2023–2024: Lifeplus Wahoo
- 2025–: Roland Le Dévoluy

Kaja Rysz (born 10 April 1999) is a Polish road cyclist, who currently rides for UCI Women's WorldTeam Roland Le Dévoluy.

== Major results ==
2019
8th Road race, National Championships
2022
9th Road race, National Championships
10th Districtenpijl - Ekeren-Deurne
2023
7th Road race, National Championships
2024
7th La Classique Morbihan
8th Argenta Classic - 2 Districtenpijl Ekeren-Deurne
