= Franziska Koch (cyclist) =

German cyclist (born 2000)

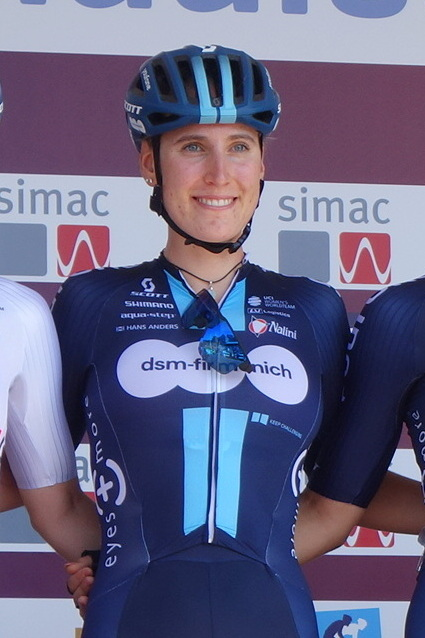
- Koch at the 2023 Simac Ladies Tour

Personal information
- Full name: Franziska Koch
- Born: 13 July 2000 (age 26) Mettmann, Germany

Cycling career
- Sport: Cycling
- Current team: FDJ United–Suez
- Disciplines: Road; Track; Mountain biking
- Role: Rider

Amateur teams
- 2010–2013: RV Edelweiss Mettmann 1906
- 2014–2018: RSV Unna 1968
- 2019: Watersley R&D Cycling Team

Professional teams
- 2019–2025: Team Sunweb
- 2026-: FDJ United–Suez

Major wins
- One-day races and Classics National Road Race Championships (2024, 2025) Paris–Roubaix (2026)
Medal record
Women's road bicycle racing
Representing Germany
World Championships
Silver medal – second place	2024 Zurich	Mixed team relay
Bronze medal – third place	2023 Glasgow	Mixed team relay
European Championships
Silver medal – second place	2024 Limburg	Mixed team relay
Bronze medal – third place	2023 Drenthe	Mixed team relay

Franziska Koch (born 13 July 2000 in Mettmann) is a German cyclist, who currently rides for UCI Women's WorldTeam FDJ United–Suez.

Koch started her career at local club RV Edelweiss Mettmann 1906 in 2010. In 2016 she won second place in junior national track championships on the Omnium. In 2017 she returned to win the Omnium national title. That year, she also won the Cross Country national title in mountain biking, and came third in the national junior road championships.

In 2024, Koch won her first major title by winning the German National Road Race Championships.

In 2026, Koch won her first UCI Women's World Tour race by winning Paris–Roubaix Femmes.

== Major results ==
2018
3rd Time trial, National Junior Road Championships
2019 (1 pro win)
1st Stage 4 Boels Ladies Tour
4th Overall Festival Elsy Jacobs

1st Young rider classification

4th Road race, National Road Championships
5th Road race, UEC European Under-23 Road Championships
7th Omloop van Borsele
10th Overall Madrid Challenge by La Vuelta
2020
UEC European Under-23 Road Championships

2nd Time trial
4th Road race

2021
7th Road race, UEC European Road Championships
7th Paris–Roubaix
7th Ronde van Drenthe
2023
2nd Antwerp Port Epic
3rd Team relay, UCI Road World Championships
3rd Team relay, UEC European Road Championships
4th Time trial, National Road Championships
2024 (1)
National Road Championships

1st Road race
4th Time trial

2nd Team relay, UCI World Championships
2nd Team relay, UEC European Road Championships
6th Binche Chimay Binche
2025 (1)
1st Road race, National Road Championships
Tour de France

Combativity award Stages 1 & 4

2026 (1)
1st Paris–Roubaix
3rd UCI Road World Championships – Women's time trial
5th Omloop Het Nieuwsblad
8th Dwars door Vlaanderen
10th UCI Road World Championships – Women's road race
10th Tour of Flanders
