= Akvilė Gedraitytė =

Lithuanian cyclist (born 2001)

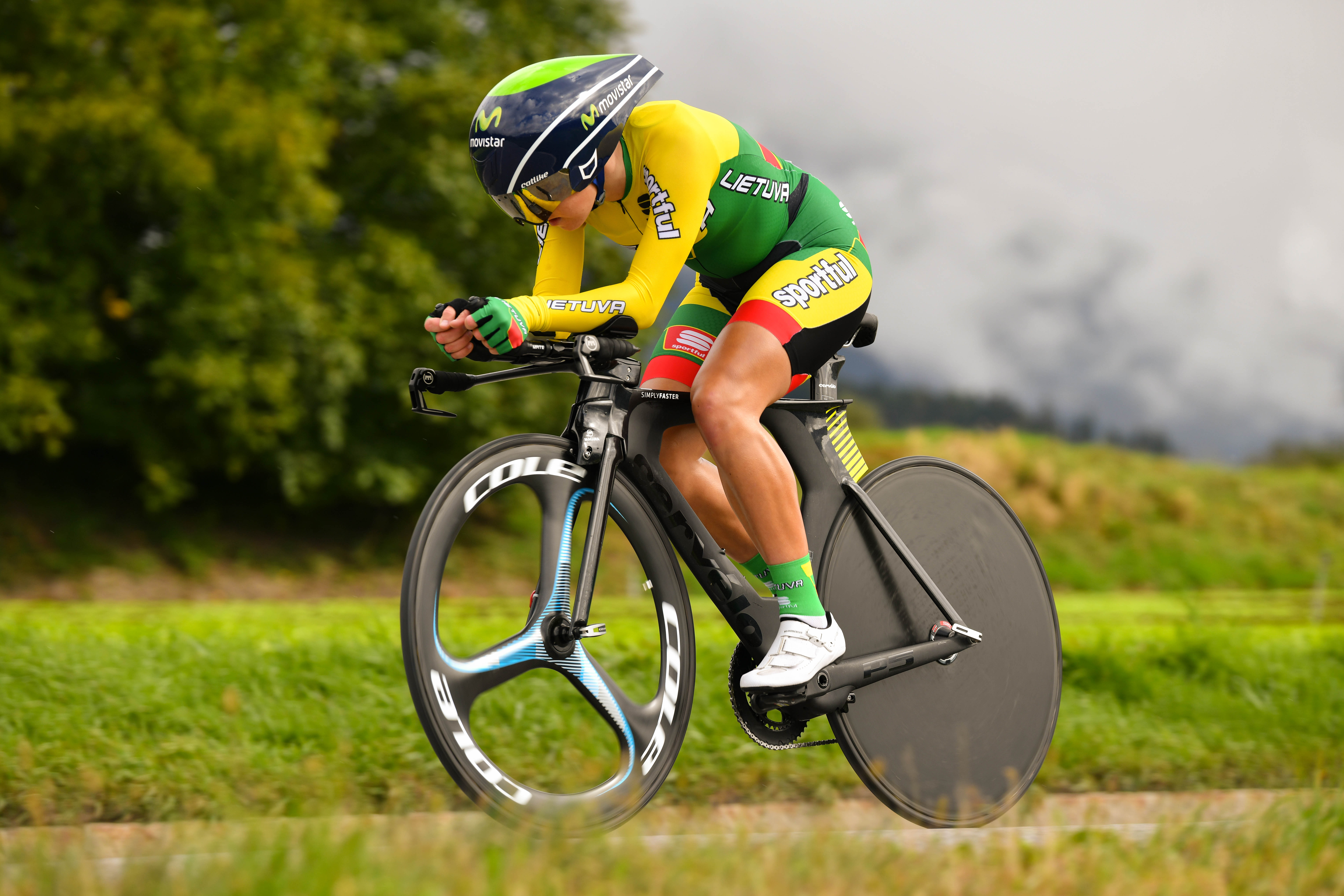
- Gedraitytė in 2018

Personal information
- Born: 14 February 2001 (age 25)

Cycling career
- Sport: Cycling
- Current team: WCC Team
- Discipline: Road
- Role: Rider

Professional team
- 2020–: WCC Team

Akvilė Gedraitytė (born 14 February 2001) is a Lithuanian professional racing cyclist, who currently rides for UCI Women's Continental Team WCC Team. She rode in the women's junior time trial at the 2018 UCI Road World Championships and the 2019 UCI Road World Championships, and the women's time trial event at the 2020 UCI Road World Championships.
