= 2024 UEC European Track Championships – Women's points race =

Women's points race at the 2024 UEC European Track Championships
- Venue: Omnisport Apeldoorn, Apeldoorn
- Date: 13 January
- Competitors: 19 from 19 nations
- Winning points: 24

Medalists
gold medal	Lotte Kopecky	Belgium
silver medal	Anita Stenberg	Norway
bronze medal	Jarmila Machačová	Czech Republic

The women's points race competition at the 2024 UEC European Track Championships was held on 13 January 2024.

== Results ==
100 laps (25 km) were raced with 10 sprints.

Rank	Name	Nation	Lap points	Sprint points	Finish order	Total points
1st place, gold medalist(s)	Lotte Kopecky	Belgium	0	24	14	24
2nd place, silver medalist(s)	Anita Stenberg	Norway	0	19	12	19
3rd place, bronze medalist(s)	Jarmila Machačová	Czech Republic	0	18	1	18
4	Lara Gillespie	Ireland	0	11	6	11
5	Wiktoria Pikulik	Poland	0	11	8	11
6	Marit Raaijmakers	Netherlands	0	10	5	10
7	Clara Copponi	France	0	9	11	9
8	Argyro Milaki	Greece	0	6	2	6
9	Alberte Greve	Denmark	0	4	3	4
10	Sophie Lewis	Great Britain	0	4	13	4
11	Silvia Zanardi	Italy	0	2	4	2
12	Lena Charlotte Reißner	Germany	0	2	10	2
13	Eukene Larrarte	Spain	0	0	7	0
14	Daniela Campos	Portugal	0	0	9	0
15	Jasmin Liechti	Switzerland	–20	0	15	–20
16	Arina Korotieieva	Ukraine	–40	0	–	DNF
17	Nora Jenčušová	Slovakia	–60	0	–	DNF
–	Leila Gschwentner	Austria	0	0	–	DNF
–	Olivija Baleišytė	Lithuania	0	1	–	DNF
