= 2026 UCI Track Cycling World Championships – Women's elimination =

Women's elimination at the 2026 UCI Track Cycling World Championships
- Venue: Shanghai Velodrome
- Location: Shanghai, China
- Dates: 15 October
- Competitors: 23 from 23 nations

Medalists
gold medal	Lotte Kopecky	Belgium
silver medal	Yumi Kajihara	Japan
bronze medal	Megan Jastrab	United States

The Women's elimination competition at the 2026 UCI Track Cycling World Championships was held on 15 October 2026.

== Results ==
The race was started at 18:30.

Rank	Name	Nation
1st place, gold medalist(s)	Lotte Kopecky	Belgium
2nd place, silver medalist(s)	Yumi Kajihara	Japan
3rd place, bronze medalist(s)	Megan Jastrab	United States
4	Alyssa Polites	Australia
5	Valentine Fortin	France
6	Valeria Valgonen	Individual Neutral Athletes
7	Lea Lin Teutenberg	Germany
8	Yuli van der Molen	Netherlands
9	Abi Miller	Great Britain
10	Lorena Leu	Switzerland
11	Scarlet Cortés	Chile
12	Barbora Němcová	Czechia
13	Leyre Almena	Spain
14	Rachele Barbieri	Italy
15	Ellen Klinge	Denmark
16	Emma Jeffers	Ireland
17	Lee Sze Wing	Hong Kong
18	Yareli Acevedo	Mexico
19	Daniela Campos	Portugal
20	Yuan Haidi	China
21	Samantha Donnelly	New Zealand
22	Alexi Ramirez	Trinidad and Tobago
23	Olivija Baleišytė	Lithuania
