= 2023 UCI Track Cycling World Championships – Women's madison =

Women's madison at the 2023 UCI Track Cycling World Championships
- Venue: Sir Chris Hoy Velodrome
- Location: Glasgow, United Kingdom
- Dates: 7 August
- Competitors: 36 from 18 nations
- Teams: 18
- Winning points: 28

Medalists
gold medal	Neah Evans; Elinor Barker	Great Britain
silver medal	Georgia Baker; Alexandra Manly	Australia
bronze medal	Victoire Berteau; Clara Copponi	France

The Women's madison competition at the 2023 UCI Track Cycling World Championships was held on 7 August 2023.

== Results ==
The race was started at 19:34.

Rank	Riders	Nation	Laps points	Sprint points	Total points
1st place, gold medalist(s)	Neah Evans; Elinor Barker	Great Britain	0	28	28
2nd place, silver medalist(s)	Georgia Baker; Alexandra Manly	Australia	0	25	25
3rd place, bronze medalist(s)	Victoire Berteau; Clara Copponi	France	0	22	22
4	Daria Pikulik; Wiktoria Pikulik	Poland	0	21	21
5	Martina Fidanza; Chiara Consonni	Italy	0	14	14
6	Jennifer Valente; Lily Williams	United States	0	10	10
7	Ally Wollaston; Bryony Botha	New Zealand	0	10	10
8	Yumi Kajihara; Tsuyaka Uchino	Japan	0	5	5
9	Amalie Dideriksen; Ellen Klinge	Denmark	0	2	2
10	Marit Raaijmakers; Maike van der Duin	Netherlands	0	2	2
11	Lea Lin Teutenberg; Franziska Brauße	Germany	–20	2	–18
12	Lara Gillespie; Alice Sharpe	Ireland	–20	2	–18
13	Katrijn De Clercq; Hélène Hesters	Belgium	–20	0	–18
14	Aline Seitz; Michelle Andres	Switzerland	–40	0	–40
15	Petra Ševčíková; Kateřina Kohoutková	Czech Republic	–40	0	–40
–	Nafosat Kozieva; Margarita Misyurina	Uzbekistan	Did not finish		
–	Mariía Gaxiola; Lizbeth Salazar	Mexico	Did not finish		
–	Lee Sze Wing; Yang Qianyu	Hong Kong	Did not finish		
