= 2022 UCI Track Cycling World Championships – Women's madison =

Women's madison at the 2022 UCI Track Cycling World Championships
- Venue: Vélodrome National
- Location: Saint-Quentin-en-Yvelines, France
- Dates: 15 October
- Competitors: 36 from 18 nations
- Teams: 18
- Winning points: 32

Medalists
gold medal	Shari Bossuyt; Lotte Kopecky	Belgium
silver medal	Clara Copponi; Valentine Fortin	France
bronze medal	Amalie Dideriksen; Julie Leth	Denmark

The Women's madison competition at the 2022 UCI Track Cycling World Championships was held on 15 October 2022.

== Results ==
The race was started at 18:10.

Rank	Riders	Nation	Laps points	Sprint points	Total points
1st place, gold medalist(s)	Shari Bossuyt; Lotte Kopecky	Belgium	20	12	32
2nd place, silver medalist(s)	Clara Copponi; Valentine Fortin	France	0	31	31
3rd place, bronze medalist(s)	Amalie Dideriksen; Julie Leth	Denmark	0	23	23
4	Georgia Baker; Alexandra Manly	Australia	0	19	19
5	Neah Evans; Laura Kenny	Great Britain	0	17	17
6	Maike van der Duin; Marit Raaijmakers	Netherlands	0	15	15
7	Rachele Barbieri; Chiara Consonni	Italy	0	11	11
8	Michaela Drummond; Ally Wollaston	New Zealand	0	7	7
9	Lily Williams; Megan Jastrab	United States	0	2	2
10	Léna Mettraux; Aline Seitz	Switzerland	0	1	1
11	Lena Charlotte Reißner; Lea Lin Teutenberg	Germany	−20	5	−15
12	Maggie Coles-Lyster; Sarah Van Dam	Canada	−20	0	−20
13	Mia Griffin; Alice Sharpe	Ireland	−40	0	−40
–	Wiktoria Pikulik; Olga Wankiewicz	Poland	Did not finish		
–	Tania Calvo; Laura Rodríguez	Spain	Did not finish		
–	Yumi Kajihara; Tsuyaka Uchino	Japan	Did not finish		
–	Lee Sze Wing; Leung Bo Yee	Hong Kong	Did not finish		
–	Sofiya Karimova; Nafosat Kozieva	Uzbekistan	Did not finish		
