= 2024 UCI Road World Championships – Women's time trial =

Cycling event

Women's time trial
2024 UCI Road World Championships

Race details
- Dates: 22 September 2024
- Distance: 29.9 km (18.6 mi)
- Winning time: 39' 16"

Medalists
	Gold	(Australia) Grace Brown (AUS)
	Silver	(Netherlands) Demi Vollering (NED)
	Bronze	(United States) Chloé Dygert (USA)

The Women's time trial of the 2024 UCI Road World Championships was a cycling event that took place on 22 September 2024 in Zurich, Switzerland. It was the 31st edition of the championship, for which Chloé Dygert of the United States was the defending champion, having won in 2023.

== Continental champions ==
Name	Country	Reason
Chloé Dygert	United States	Incumbent World Champion
Aurelie Halbwachs	Mauritius	African Champion
Olga Zabelinskaya	Uzbekistan	Asian Champion
Lotte Kopecky	Belgium	European Champion
Isabelle Carnes	Australia	Oceanian Champion
Amber Neben	United States	Panamerican Champion

== Final classification ==
Pos.	Position in the time trial
Time	Time taken to complete the time trial
Diff	Deficit to the winner of the time trial
DNS	Denotes a rider who did not start
DNF	Denotes a rider who did not finish
DSQ	Denotes a rider who was disqualified from the race
OTL	Denotes a rider who finished outside the time limit

Rank	Rider	Country	Time
1st place, gold medalist(s)	Grace Brown	Australia	39' 16"
2nd place, silver medalist(s)	Demi Vollering	Netherlands	+ 16"
3rd place, bronze medalist(s)	Chloé Dygert	United States	+ 56"
4	Antonia Niedermaier	Germany	+ 1' 05"
5	Lotte Kopecky	Belgium	+ 1' 39"
6	Christina Schweinberger	Austria	+ 1' 44"
7	Anna Henderson	United Kingdom	+ 1' 44"
8	Ellen van Dijk	Netherlands	+ 1' 47"
9	Juliette Labous	France	+ 1' 51"
10	Amber Neben	United States	+ 2' 20"
11	Brodie Chapman	Australia	+ 2' 26"
12	Mie Bjørndal Ottestad	Norway	+ 2' 46"
13	Elena Hartmann	Switzerland	+ 2' 49"
14	Cédrine Kerbaol	France	+ 2' 49"
15	Franziska Koch	Germany	+ 3' 04"
15	Yuliia Biriukova	Ukraine	+ 3' 04"
17	Urška Žigart	Slovenia	+ 3' 06"
18	Paula Findlay	Canada	+ 3' 09"
19	Vittoria Guazzini	Italy	+ 3' 11"
20	Jasmin Liechti	Switzerland	+ 3' 16"
21	Emily Ehrlich	United States	+ 3' 21"
22	Julie De Wilde	Belgium	+ 3' 21"
23	Rebecca Koerner	Denmark	+ 3' 26"
24	Teniel Campbell	Trinidad and Tobago	+ 3' 29"
25	Marie Schreiber	Luxembourg	+ 3' 32"
26	Anniina Ahtosalo	Finland	+ 3' 41"
27	Tabea Huys	Austria	+ 3' 43"
28	Mireia Benito	Spain	+ 3' 43"
29	Stina Kagevi	Sweden	+ 3' 45"
30	Olivia Baril	Canada	+ 3' 45"
31	Agnieszka Skalniak-Sójka	Poland	+ 3' 47"
32	Eugenia Bujak	Slovenia	+ 3' 50"
33	Nora Jenčušová	Slovakia	+ 4' 03"
34	Alberte Greve	Denmark	+ 4' 26"
35	Dana Rožlapa	Latvia	+ 4' 32"
36	Laura Lizette Sander	Estonia	+ 4' 53"
37	Lauren Stephens	United States	+ 4' 54"
38	Estefania Herrera	Colombia	+ 5' 00"
39	Diana Peñuela	Colombia	+ 5' 08"
40	Gaia Masetti	Italy	+ 5' 29"
41	Paula Blasi	Spain	+ 5' 35"
42	Fernanda Yapura	Argentina	+ 5' 37"
43	Isabelle Carnes	Australia	+ 5' 39"
44	Wilma Aintila	Finland	+ 5' 41"
45	Floren Scrafton	Bolivia	+ 5' 43"
46	Rotem Gafinovitz	Israel	+ 5' 50"
47	Leung Wing Yee	Hong Kong	+ 5' 51"
48	Agua Marina Espínola	Paraguay	+ 6' 13"
49	Yulduz Hashimi	Afghanistan	+ 6' 32"
50	Fariba Hashimi	Afghanistan	+ 6' 37"
51	Maho Kakita	Japan	+ 6' 42"
52	Tang Xin	China	+ 7' 17"
53	Zhou Qiuying	China	+ 7' 24"
54	Olga Shekel	Ukraine	+ 7' 32"
55	Miryam Núñez	Ecuador	+ 7' 42"
56	Eyeru Tesfoam Gebru	Ethiopia	+ 8' 05"
57	Dewika Mulya Sova	Indonesia	+ 8' 20"
58	Neyran Neriman Elden Kosker	Turkey	+ 8' 38"
59	Jess Pratt	Malta	+ 8' 41"
60	Diane Ingabire	Rwanda	+ 9' 13"
61	Ayustina Delia Priatna	Indonesia	+ 9' 15"
62	Gergana Stoyanova	Bulgaria	+ 10' 26"
63	Anujin Jinjiibadam	Mongolia	+ 10' 37"
64	Solongo Tserenlkham	Mongolia	+ 10' 39"
65	Iuliana-Alexandra Cioclu	Romania	+ 12' 04"
66	Petya Minkova	Bulgaria	+ 12' 51"
67	Viktoriya Sidorenko	Azerbaijan	+ 13' 02"
68	Hermionne Ahouissou	Benin	+ 13' 27"
69	Cătălina Andreea Cătineanu	Romania	+ 13' 46"
70	Gissel Andino	Honduras	+ 13' 57"
