= 2023 UCI Track Cycling World Championships – Women's points race =

Women's points race at the 2023 UCI Track Cycling World Championships
- Venue: Sir Chris Hoy Velodrome
- Location: Glasgow, United Kingdom
- Dates: 8 August
- Competitors: 22 from 22 nations
- Winning points: 39

Medalists
gold medal	Lotte Kopecky	Belgium
silver medal	Georgia Baker	Australia
bronze medal	Tsuyaka Uchino	Japan

The Women's points race competition at the 2023 UCI Track Cycling World Championships was held on 8 August 2023.

== Results ==
The race was started at 18:42.

Rank	Name	Nation	Lap points	Sprint points	Total points
1st place, gold medalist(s)	Lotte Kopecky	Belgium	20	19	39
2nd place, silver medalist(s)	Georgia Baker	Australia	20	11	31
3rd place, bronze medalist(s)	Tsuyaka Uchino	Japan	0	14	14
4	Lily Williams	United States	0	9	9
5	Neah Evans	Great Britain	0	9	9
6	Marit Raaijmakers	Netherlands	0	8	8
7	Silvia Zanardi	Italy	0	8	8
8	Daniela Campos	Portugal	0	5	5
9	Lea Lin Teutenberg	Germany	0	4	4
10	Jarmila Machačová	Czech Republic	0	3	3
11	Michaela Drummond	New Zealand	0	3	3
12	Ariane Bonhomme	Canada	0	2	2
13	Liu Jiali	China	0	2	2
14	Nafosat Kozieva	Uzbekistan	0	1	1
15	Karolina Karasiewicz	Poland	0	0	0
16	Yareli Acevedo	Mexico	–20	16	–4
17	Marie Le Net	France	–20	6	–14
18	Ziortza Isasi	Spain	–20	1	–19
19	Verena Eberhardt	Austria	–20	0	–20
20	Michelle Andres	Switzerland	–20	0	–20
21	Bo Yee Leung	Hong Kong	–40	0	–40
—	Fanny Cauchois	Laos	Did not finish		
