= 2024 UAE Tour Women =

Emirati cycling race

2024 UCI Women's World Tour, race 3 of 27

Race details
- Dates: 8–11 February 2024
- Stages: 4
- Distance: 468 km (291 mi)
- Winning time: 11h 16' 51"

Results
| Jersey awarded to the overall winner | Winner | Lotte Kopecky (BEL) | (Team SD Worx–Protime) |
| | Second | Neve Bradbury (AUS) | (Canyon//SRAM) |
| | Third | Mavi García (ESP) | (Liv AlUla Jayco) |
| Jersey awarded to the points classification winner | Points | Lorena Wiebes (NED) | (Team SD Worx–Protime) |
| Jersey awarded to the youth classification winner | Youth | Neve Bradbury (AUS) | (Canyon//SRAM) |
| Jersey awarded to the sprints classification winner | Sprints | Lotte Kopecky (BEL) | (Team SD Worx–Protime) |
| | Team | (Germany) Canyon//SRAM | |

The 2024 UAE Tour Women was a road cycling stage race that took place between 8 and 11 February in the United Arab Emirates. It was the second edition of the UAE Tour Women, and the third race of the 2024 UCI Women's World Tour. The race was won by Belgian rider Lotte Kopecky of Team SD Worx–Protime, with Kopecky also winning the sprints jersey.

== Teams ==
Thirteen UCI Women's WorldTeams and seven UCI Women's Continental Teams took part in the race.

UCI Women's WorldTeams

- Canyon//SRAM
- Ceratizit–WNT Pro Cycling
- FDJ–Suez
- Fenix–Deceuninck
- Human Powered Health
- Lidl–Trek
- Liv AlUla Jayco
- Movistar Team
- Roland
- Team dsm–firmenich PostNL
- Team SD Worx–Protime
- UAE Team ADQ
- Uno-X Mobility

UCI Women's Continental Teams

- St. Michel–Mavic–Auber93
- Cofidis
- EF Education–Cannondale
- Laboral Kutxa–Fundación Euskadi
- Tashkent City Women Professional Cycling Team
- Team Coop–Repsol
- Top Girls Fassa Bortolo

== Route ==
The route was announced in January 2024, with three sprint stages and one mountain stage.

Stage characteristics and winners
| Stage | Date | Course | Distance | Type | Stage winner |
|---|---|---|---|---|---|
| 1 | 8 February | Dubai Miracle Garden to Dubai Harbour | 122 km (76 mi) | Flat stage | Lorena Wiebes (NED) |
| 2 | 9 February | Al Mirfa to Madinat Zayed | 113 km (70 mi) | Flat stage | Lorena Wiebes (NED) |
| 3 | 10 February | Al Ain Police Museum to Jebel Hafeet | 128 km (80 mi) | Mountain stage | Lotte Kopecky (BEL) |
| 4 | 11 February | Louvre Abu Dhabi to Abu Dhabi Breakwater | 105 km (65 mi) | Flat stage | Amber Kraak (NED) |
| Total | | | 468 km (291 mi) | | |

== Stages ==
=== Stage 1 ===
8 February 2024 — Dubai Miracle Garden to Dubai Harbour, 122 km (76 mi)

Stage 1 Result
| Rank | Rider | Team | Time |
|---|---|---|---|
| 1 | Lorena Wiebes (NED) | Team SD Worx–Protime | 2h 59' 11" |
| 2 | Rachele Barbieri (ITA) | Team dsm–firmenich PostNL | + 0" |
| 3 | Chiara Consonni (ITA) | UAE Team ADQ | + 0" |
| 4 | Georgia Baker (AUS) | Liv AlUla Jayco | + 0" |
| 5 | Maggie Coles-Lyster (CAN) | Roland | + 0" |
| 6 | Valentine Fortin (FRA) | Cofidis | + 0" |
| 7 | Laura Ruiz Pérez (ESP) | Movistar Team | + 0" |
| 8 | Sofia Collinelli (ITA) | Roland | + 0" |
| 9 | Lotte Kopecky (BEL) | Team SD Worx–Protime | + 0" |
| 10 | Clara Copponi (FRA) | Lidl–Trek | + 0" |

General classification after Stage 1
| Rank | Rider | Team | Time |
|---|---|---|---|
| 1 | Lorena Wiebes (NED) | Team SD Worx–Protime | 2h 59' 01" |
| 2 | Rachele Barbieri (ITA) | Team dsm–firmenich PostNL | + 4" |
| 3 | Chiara Consonni (ITA) | UAE Team ADQ | + 6" |
| 4 | Yanina Kuskova (UZB) | Tashkent City Women Professional Cycling Team | + 7" |
| 5 | Alice Palazzi (ITA) | Top Girls Fassa Bortolo | + 7" |
| 6 | Loes Adegeest (NED) | FDJ–Suez | + 8" |
| 7 | Gaia Segato (ITA) | Top Girls Fassa Bortolo | + 8" |
| 8 | Lotte Kopecky (BEL) | Team SD Worx–Protime | + 9" |
| 9 | Karlijn Swinkels (NED) | UAE Team ADQ | + 9" |
| 10 | Georgia Baker (AUS) | Liv AlUla Jayco | + 10" |

=== Stage 2 ===
9 February 2024 – Al Mirfa to Madinat Zayed, 113 km (70 mi)

Stage 2 Result
| Rank | Rider | Team | Time |
|---|---|---|---|
| 1 | Lorena Wiebes (NED) | Team SD Worx–Protime | 2h 28' 08" |
| 2 | Chiara Consonni (ITA) | UAE Team ADQ | + 0" |
| 3 | Clara Copponi (FRA) | Lidl–Trek | + 0" |
| 4 | Georgia Baker (AUS) | Liv AlUla Jayco | + 0" |
| 5 | Martina Fidanza (ITA) | Ceratizit–WNT Pro Cycling | + 0" |
| 6 | Vittoria Guazzini (ITA) | FDJ–Suez | + 0" |
| 7 | Maria Giulia Confalonieri (ITA) | Uno-X Mobility | + 0" |
| 8 | Anniina Ahtosalo (FIN) | Uno-X Mobility | + 0" |
| 9 | Gladys Verhulst-Wild (FRA) | FDJ–Suez | + 0" |
| 10 | Daria Pikulik (POL) | Human Powered Health | + 0" |

General classification after Stage 2
| Rank | Rider | Team | Time |
|---|---|---|---|
| 1 | Lorena Wiebes (NED) | Team SD Worx–Protime | 5h 26' 57" |
| 2 | Chiara Consonni (ITA) | UAE Team ADQ | + 12" |
| 3 | Rachele Barbieri (ITA) | Team dsm–firmenich PostNL | + 16" |
| 4 | Lotte Kopecky (BEL) | Team SD Worx–Protime | + 17" |
| 5 | Clara Copponi (FRA) | Lidl–Trek | + 18" |
| 6 | Loes Adegeest (NED) | FDJ–Suez | + 18" |
| 7 | Daria Pikulik (POL) | Human Powered Health | + 19" |
| 8 | Yanina Kuskova (UZB) | Tashkent City Women Professional Cycling Team | + 19" |
| 9 | Alice Palazzi (ITA) | Top Girls Fassa Bortolo | + 19" |
| 10 | Flora Perkins (GBR) | Fenix–Deceuninck | + 21" |

=== Stage 3 ===
10 February 2024 – Al Ain Police Museum to Jebel Hafeet, 128 km (80 mi)

Stage 3 Result
| Rank | Rider | Team | Time |
|---|---|---|---|
| 1 | Lotte Kopecky (BEL) | Team SD Worx–Protime | 3h 22' 15" |
| 2 | Neve Bradbury (AUS) | Canyon//SRAM | + 3" |
| 3 | Mavi García (ESP) | Liv AlUla Jayco | + 32" |
| 4 | Gaia Realini (ITA) | Lidl–Trek | + 43" |
| 5 | Marion Bunel (FRA) | St. Michel–Mavic–Auber93 | + 1' 00" |
| 6 | Pauliena Rooijakkers (NED) | Fenix–Deceuninck | + 1' 04" |
| 7 | Elisa Longo Borghini (ITA) | Lidl–Trek | + 1' 09" |
| 8 | Silvia Persico (ITA) | UAE Team ADQ | + 1' 29" |
| 9 | Mareille Meijering (NED) | Movistar Team | + 1' 29" |
| 10 | Ricarda Bauernfeind (GER) | Canyon//SRAM | + 1' 32" |

General classification after Stage 3
| Rank | Rider | Team | Time |
|---|---|---|---|
| 1 | Lotte Kopecky (BEL) | Team SD Worx–Protime | 8h 49' 18" |
| 2 | Neve Bradbury (AUS) | Canyon//SRAM | + 13" |
| 3 | Mavi García (ESP) | Liv AlUla Jayco | + 44" |
| 4 | Gaia Realini (ITA) | Lidl–Trek | + 59" |
| 5 | Marion Bunel (FRA) | St. Michel–Mavic–Auber93 | + 1' 16" |
| 6 | Pauliena Rooijakkers (NED) | Fenix–Deceuninck | + 1' 20" |
| 7 | Elisa Longo Borghini (ITA) | Lidl–Trek | + 1' 25" |
| 8 | Silvia Persico (ITA) | UAE Team ADQ | + 1' 45" |
| 9 | Mareille Meijering (NED) | Movistar Team | + 1' 45" |
| 10 | Ricarda Bauernfeind (GER) | Canyon//SRAM | + 1' 48" |

=== Stage 4 ===
11 February 2024 – Louvre Abu Dhabi to Abu Dhabi Breakwater, 105 km (65 mi)

Stage 4 Result
| Rank | Rider | Team | Time |
|---|---|---|---|
| 1 | Amber Kraak (NED) | FDJ–Suez | 2h 27' 33" |
| 2 | Lorena Wiebes (NED) | Team SD Worx–Protime | + 0" |
| 3 | Daria Pikulik (POL) | Human Powered Health | + 0" |
| 4 | Chiara Consonni (ITA) | UAE Team ADQ | + 0" |
| 5 | Valentine Fortin (FRA) | Cofidis | + 0" |
| 6 | Rachele Barbieri (ITA) | Team dsm–firmenich PostNL | + 0" |
| 7 | Anniina Ahtosalo (FIN) | Uno-X Mobility | + 0" |
| 8 | Agnieszka Skalniak-Sójka (POL) | Canyon//SRAM | + 0" |
| 9 | Clara Copponi (FRA) | Lidl–Trek | + 0" |
| 10 | Laura Tomasi (ITA) | Laboral Kutxa–Fundación Euskadi | + 0" |

General classification after Stage 4
| Rank | Rider | Team | Time |
|---|---|---|---|
| 1 | Lotte Kopecky (BEL) | Team SD Worx–Protime | 11h 16' 51" |
| 2 | Neve Bradbury (AUS) | Canyon//SRAM | + 13" |
| 3 | Mavi García (ESP) | Liv AlUla Jayco | + 44" |
| 4 | Gaia Realini (ITA) | Lidl–Trek | + 59" |
| 5 | Marion Bunel (FRA) | St. Michel–Mavic–Auber93 | + 1' 16" |
| 6 | Pauliena Rooijakkers (NED) | Fenix–Deceuninck | + 1' 20" |
| 7 | Elisa Longo Borghini (ITA) | Lidl–Trek | + 1' 25" |
| 8 | Silvia Persico (ITA) | UAE Team ADQ | + 1' 45" |
| 9 | Mareille Meijering (NED) | Movistar Team | + 1' 45" |
| 10 | Ricarda Bauernfeind (GER) | Canyon//SRAM | + 1' 48" |

== Classification leadership table ==
Classification leadership by stage
| Stage | Winner | General classification | Points classification | Sprints classification | Young rider classification | Team classification |
|---|---|---|---|---|---|---|
| 1 | Lorena Wiebes | Lorena Wiebes | Lorena Wiebes | Yanina Kuskova | Yanina Kuskova | Roland |
| 2 | Lorena Wiebes | Lorena Wiebes | Lorena Wiebes | Lotte Kopecky | Yanina Kuskova | FDJ–Suez |
| 3 | Lotte Kopecky | Lotte Kopecky | Lorena Wiebes | Lotte Kopecky | Neve Bradbury | Canyon//SRAM |
| 4 | Amber Kraak | Lotte Kopecky | Lorena Wiebes | Lotte Kopecky | Neve Bradbury | Canyon//SRAM |
| Final | | Lotte Kopecky | Lorena Wiebes | Lotte Kopecky | Neve Bradbury | Canyon–SRAM |

== Classification standings ==
Legend
| Denotes the winner of the general classification | Denotes the winner of the sprints classification |
| Denotes the winner of the points classification | Denotes the winner of the young rider classification |

=== General classification ===
Final general classification (1–10)
| Rank | Rider | Team | Time |
|---|---|---|---|
| 1 | Lotte Kopecky (BEL) | Team SD Worx–Protime | 11h 16' 51" |
| 2 | Neve Bradbury (AUS) | Canyon//SRAM | + 13" |
| 3 | Mavi García (ESP) | Liv AlUla Jayco | + 44" |
| 4 | Gaia Realini (ITA) | Lidl–Trek | + 59" |
| 5 | Marion Bunel (FRA) | St. Michel–Mavic–Auber93 | + 1' 16" |
| 6 | Pauliena Rooijakkers (NED) | Fenix–Deceuninck | + 1' 20" |
| 7 | Elisa Longo Borghini (ITA) | Lidl–Trek | + 1' 25" |
| 8 | Silvia Persico (ITA) | UAE Team ADQ | + 1' 45" |
| 9 | Mareille Meijering (NED) | Movistar Team | + 1' 45" |
| 10 | Ricarda Bauernfeind (GER) | Canyon//SRAM | + 1' 48" |

=== Points classification ===
Final points classification (1–10)
| Rank | Rider | Team | Points |
|---|---|---|---|
| 1 | Lorena Wiebes (NED) | Team SD Worx–Protime | 62 |
| 2 | Lotte Kopecky (BEL) | Team SD Worx–Protime | 39 |
| 3 | Chiara Consonni (ITA) | UAE Team ADQ | 37 |
| 4 | Amber Kraak (NED) | FDJ–Suez | 26 |
| 5 | Daria Pikulik (POL) | Human Powered Health | 26 |
| 6 | Rachele Barbieri (ITA) | Team dsm–firmenich PostNL | 21 |
| 7 | Georgia Baker (AUS) | Liv AlUla Jayco | 18 |
| 8 | Monica Greenwood (GBR) | Team Coop–Repsol | 16 |
| 9 | Neve Bradbury (AUS) | Canyon//SRAM | 16 |
| 10 | Clara Copponi (FRA) | Lidl–Trek | 15 |

=== Sprints classification ===
Final sprints classification (1–10)
| Rank | Rider | Team | Points |
|---|---|---|---|
| 1 | Lotte Kopecky (BEL) | Team SD Worx–Protime | 17 |
| 2 | Monica Greenwood (GBR) | Team Coop–Repsol | 16 |
| 3 | Daria Pikulik (POL) | Human Powered Health | 13 |
| 4 | Loes Adegeest (NED) | FDJ–Suez | 10 |
| 5 | Sophie Wright (GBR) | Fenix–Deceuninck | 10 |
| 6 | Marie Le Net (FRA) | FDJ–Suez | 9 |
| 7 | Yanina Kuskova (UZB) | Tashkent City Women Professional Cycling Team | 8 |
| 8 | Gladys Verhulst-Wild (FRA) | FDJ–Suez | 8 |
| 9 | Alice Palazzi (ITA) | Top Girls Fassa Bortolo | 8 |
| 10 | Amber Kraak (NED) | FDJ–Suez | 6 |

=== Young rider classification ===
Final young rider classification (1–10)
| Rank | Rider | Team | Time |
|---|---|---|---|
| 1 | Neve Bradbury (AUS) | Canyon//SRAM | 11h 17' 04" |
| 2 | Gaia Realini (ITA) | Lidl–Trek | + 46" |
| 3 | Marion Bunel (FRA) | St. Michel–Mavic–Auber93 | + 1' 03" |
| 4 | Petra Stiasny (SUI) | Fenix–Deceuninck | + 2' 52" |
| 5 | Alice Towers (GBR) | Canyon//SRAM | + 4' 20" |
| 6 | Silke Smulders (NED) | Liv AlUla Jayco | + 4' 48" |
| 7 | Yanina Kuskova (UZB) | Tashkent City Women Professional Cycling Team | + 5' 07" |
| 8 | Linda Zanetti (SUI) | Human Powered Health | + 7' 02" |
| 9 | Flora Perkins (GBR) | Fenix–Deceuninck | + 7' 41" |
| 10 | Gaia Segato (ITA) | Top Girls Fassa Bortolo | + 9' 01" |

=== Teams classification ===
Final team classification (1–10)
| Rank | Team | Time |
|---|---|---|
| 1 | (Germany) Canyon//SRAM | 33h 56' 10" |
| 2 | (France) St. Michel–Mavic–Auber93 | + 49" |
| 3 | (United Arab Emirates) UAE Team ADQ | + 1' 53" |
| 4 | (Belgium) Fenix–Deceuninck | + 4' 38" |
| 5 | (France) FDJ–Suez | + 8' 48" |
| 6 | (Australia) Liv AlUla Jayco | + 9' 09" |
| 7 | (United States) Lidl–Trek | + 9' 13" |
| 8 | (Norway) Uno-X Mobility | + 11' 59" |
| 9 | (Netherlands) Team dsm–firmenich PostNL | + 13' 39" |
| 10 | (France) Cofidis | + 14' 23" |
