= 2023 UCI Track Cycling World Championships – Women's elimination =

Women's elimination at the 2023 UCI Track Cycling World Championships
- Venue: Sir Chris Hoy Velodrome
- Location: Glasgow, United Kingdom
- Dates: 6 August
- Competitors: 23 from 23 nations

Medalists
gold medal	Lotte Kopecky	Belgium
silver medal	Valentine Fortin	France
bronze medal	Jennifer Valente	United States

The Women's elimination competition at the 2023 UCI Track Cycling World Championships was held on 6 August 2023.

== Results ==
The race was started at 18:34.

Rank	Name	Nation
1st place, gold medalist(s)	Lotte Kopecky	Belgium
2nd place, silver medalist(s)	Valentine Fortin	France
3rd place, bronze medalist(s)	Jennifer Valente	United States
4	Rachele Barbieri	Italy
5	Elinor Barker	Great Britain
6	Olivija Baleišytė	Lithuania
7	Sarah van Dam	Canada
8	Anita Stenberg	Norway
9	Lea Lin Teutenberg	Germany
10	Yareli Acevedo	Mexico
11	Ebtissam Mohamed	Egypt
12	Patrycja Lorkowska	Poland
13	Maho Kakita	Japan
14	Gabriela Bártová	Czech Republic
15	Argyro Milaki	Greece
16	Marit Raaijmakers	Netherlands
17	Alžbeta Bačíková	Slovakia
18	Nafosat Kozieva	Uzbekistan
19	Chloe Moran	Australia
20	Emily Sherman	New Zealand
21	Léna Mettraux	Switzerland
22	Emily Kay	Ireland
23	Laura Rodríguez Cordero	Spain
