= 2023 UEC European Track Championships – Women's elimination race =

Women's elimination race at the 2023 UEC European Track Championships
- Venue: Tissot Velodrome, Grenchen
- Date: 9 February
- Competitors: 16 from 16 nations

Medalists
gold medal	Lotte Kopecky	Belgium
silver medal	Valentine Fortin	France
bronze medal	Maike van der Duin	Netherlands

The women's elimination race competition at the 2023 UEC European Track Championships was held on 9 February 2023.

== Results ==
Rank	Name	Nation
1st place, gold medalist(s)	Lotte Kopecky	Belgium
2nd place, silver medalist(s)	Valentine Fortin	France
3rd place, bronze medalist(s)	Maike van der Duin	Netherlands
4	Elinor Barker	Great Britain
5	Lea Lin Teutenberg	Germany
6	Patrycja Lorkowska	Poland
7	Laura Rodríguez	Spain
8	Michelle Andres	Switzerland
9	Kseniia Fedotova	Ukraine
10	Mia Griffin	Ireland
11	Argiro Milaki	Greece
12	Alžbeta Bačíková	Slovakia
13	Rachele Barbieri	Italy
14	Barbora Němcová	Czech Republic
15	Leila Gschwentner	Austria
16	Maria Martins	Portugal
