= Victoire Berteau =

French cyclist (born 2000)

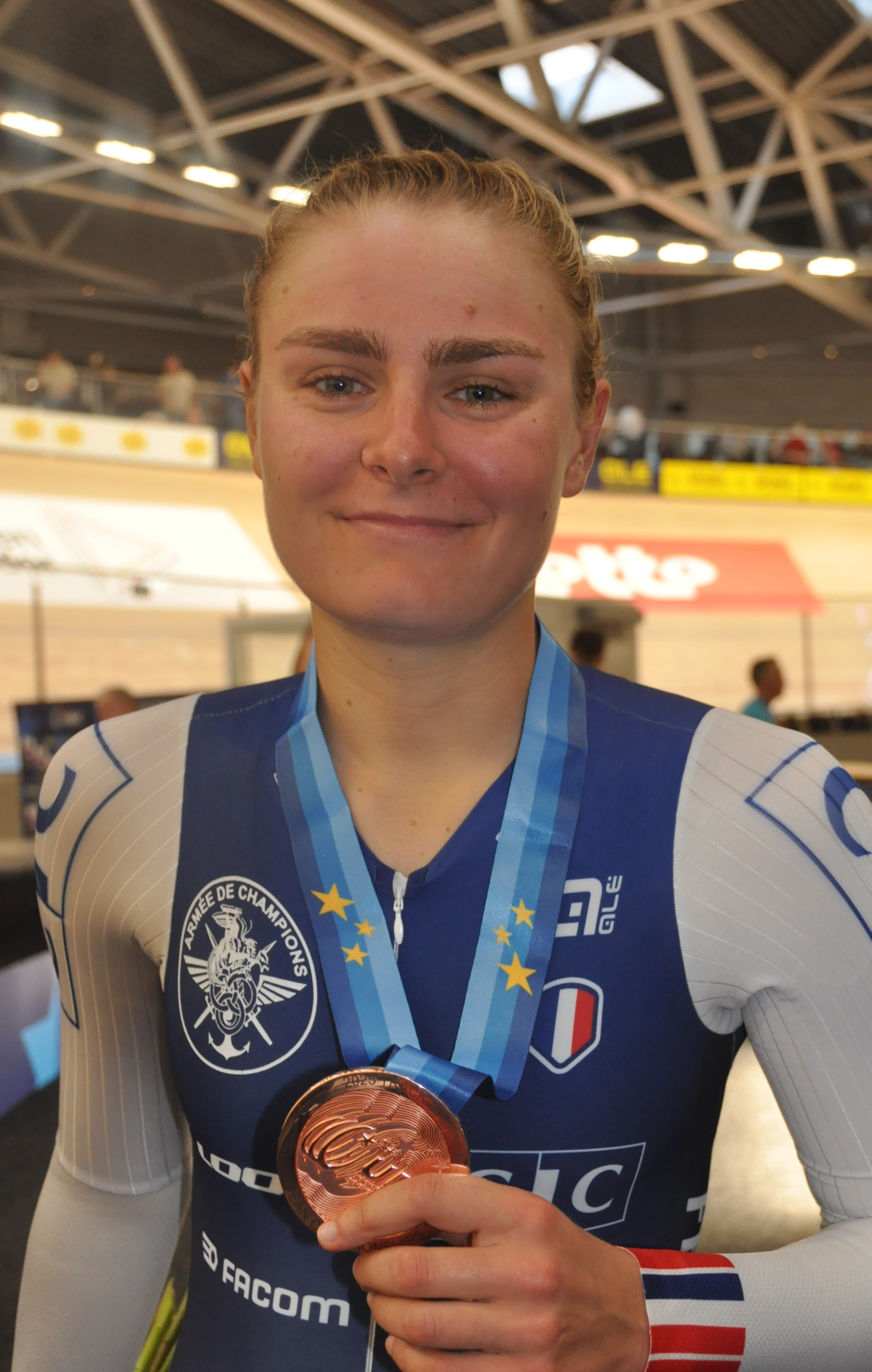
- Berteau in 2025

Personal information
- Full name: Victoire Berteau
- Born: 16 August 2000 (age 26) Lambres-lez-Douai, France

Cycling career
- Sport: Cycling
- Current team: Cofidis
- Disciplines: Road, track
- Role: Rider

Professional teams
- 2019: Doltcini–Van Eyck Sport
- 2020–2021: Doltcini–Van Eyck–Proximus
- 2022–: Cofidis
Medal record
Women's track cycling
Representing France
World Championships
Silver medal – second place	2025 Santiago	Madison
Bronze medal – third place	2022 Saint-Quentin-en-Yvelines	Team pursuit
Bronze medal – third place	2023 Glasgow	Madison
Bronze medal – third place	2023 Glasgow	Team pursuit
Bronze medal – third place	2024 Ballerup	Madison
European Championships
Silver medal – second place	2021 Grenchen	Omnium
Silver medal – second place	2023 Grenchen	Madison
Silver medal – second place	2026 Konya	Elimination
Silver medal – second place	2026 Konya	Points race
Bronze medal – third place	2021 Grenchen	Madison
Bronze medal – third place	2022 Munich	Points race
Bronze medal – third place	2022 Munich	Team pursuit
Bronze medal – third place	2025 Heusden-Zolder	Madison

Victoire Berteau (born 16 August 2000) is a French professional racing cyclist, who currently rides for UCI Women's Continental Team Cofidis.

== Major results ==
=== Road ===
2017
8th Gent–Wevelgem WJ
2018
1st Gent–Wevelgem WJ
4th Chrono des Nations Juniors
6th Overall EPZ Omloop van Borsele

1st Stage 3

2020
3rd Road race, National Under-23 Championships
2022
Combativity award Stage 5 Tour de France
2023
1st Road race, National Championships
3rd Grand Prix de Wallonie
5th Grand Prix du Morbihan
6th Grand Prix International d'Isbergues
8th Brabantse Pijl
9th Overall Bretagne Ladies Tour
2024
2nd Grand Prix du Morbihan
2nd Grand Prix International d'Isbergues
3rd Grote Prijs Beerens
4th Overall Tour de Normandie Féminin
5th La Classique Morbihan
5th Ronde van Drenthe
8th Paris–Roubaix
9th Le Samyn
10th Overall Bretagne Ladies Tour
2025
5th Grand Prix du Morbihan Féminin
10th Omloop van het Hageland

=== Track ===
2018
1st Madison, UCI World Junior Championships (with Marie Le Net)
2019
National Championships

1st Points race
2nd 500m time trial
2nd Keirin
2nd Omnium

2021
UEC European Championships

2nd Omnium
3rd Madison (with Marion Borras)

2022
3rd Team pursuit, UCI World Championships
UEC European Championships

3rd Points race
3rd Team pursuit

2023
2nd Madison, UEC European Championships (with Clara Copponi)
3rd Team pursuit, UCI World Championships
2024
3rd Madison, UCI World Championships (with Marion Borras)
2025
2nd Madison, UCI World Championships (with Marion Borras)
3rd Madison, UEC European Championships (with Marion Borras)
