= 2026 UEC European Track Championships – Women's elimination race =

Women's elimination race at the 2026 UEC Track Elite European Championships
- Venue: Konya Velodrome, Konya
- Date: 2 February
- Competitors: 21

Medalists
gold medal	Lotte Kopecky	Belgium
silver medal	Victoire Berteau	France
bronze medal	Lea Lin Teutenberg	Germany

The women's elimination race competition at the 2026 UEC European Track Championships was held on 2 February 2026.

== Results ==
Rank	Name	Nation
1st place, gold medalist(s)	Lotte Kopecky	Belgium
2nd place, silver medalist(s)	Victoire Berteau	France
3rd place, bronze medalist(s)	Lea Lin Teutenberg	Germany
4	Letizia Paternoster	Italy
5	Maja Tracka	Poland
6	Lorena Leu	Switzerland
7	Barbora Němcová	Czech Republic
8	Daniela Campos	Portugal
9	Valeriya Valgonen	Individual Neutral Athletes
10	Palina Konrad	Individual Neutral Athletes
11	Aoife O'Brien	Ireland
12	Isabella Escalera	Spain
13	Olivija Baleišytė	Lithuania
14	Nora Tveit	Norway
15	Milana Ushakova	Ukraine
16	Yuli van der Molen	Netherlands
17	Stanislava Sikelová	Slovakia
18	Lucy Nelson	Bulgaria
19	Imogen Wolff	Great Britain
20	Ellen Hjøllund Klinge	Denmark
21	Fatmanur Doğan	Turkey
