= 2021 UCI Track Cycling World Championships – Women's elimination =

Track Cycling World Championship

Women's elimination at the 2021 UCI Track Cycling World Championships
- Venue: Vélodrome Couvert Régional Jean Stablinski
- Location: Roubaix, France
- Dates: 21 October
- Competitors: 21 from 21 nations

Medalists
gold medal	Letizia Paternoster	Italy
silver medal	Lotte Kopecky	Belgium
bronze medal	Jennifer Valente	United States

The Women's elimination competition at the 2021 UCI Track Cycling World Championships was held on 21 October 2021.

== Results ==
The race was started at 21:00.

Rank	Name	Nation
1st place, gold medalist(s)	Letizia Paternoster	Italy
2nd place, silver medalist(s)	Lotte Kopecky	Belgium
3rd place, bronze medalist(s)	Jennifer Valente	United States
4	Maria Novolodskaya	Russian Cycling Federation
5	Olivija Baleišytė	Lithuania
6	Aksana Salauyeva	Belarus
7	Valentine Fortin	France
8	Michelle Andres	Switzerland
9	Eukene Larrarte	Spain
10	Rinata Sultanova	Kazakhstan
11	Lina Rojas	Colombia
12	Alžbeta Bačíková	Slovakia
13	Yumi Kajihara	Japan
14	Kseniia Fedotova	Ukraine
15	Nikol Płosaj	Poland
16	Ella Barnwell	Great Britain
17	Anita Stenberg	Norway
18	Yareli Acevedo	Mexico
19	Petra Ševčíková	Czech Republic
20	Sarah Van Dam	Canada
21	Tawakalt Yekeen	Nigeria
DNS	Maria Martins	Portugal
