= 2024 UEC European Track Championships – Women's elimination race =

Women's elimination race at the 2024 UEC European Track Championships
- Venue: Omnisport Apeldoorn, Apeldoorn
- Date: 13 January
- Competitors: 18 from 18 nations

Medalists
gold medal	Lotte Kopecky	Belgium
silver medal	Lea Teutenberg	Germany
bronze medal	Jessica Roberts	Great Britain

The women's elimination race competition at the 2024 UEC European Track Championships was held on 13 January 2024.

== Results ==
Rank	Name	Nation
1st place, gold medalist(s)	Lotte Kopecky	Belgium
2nd place, silver medalist(s)	Lea Teutenberg	Germany
3rd place, bronze medalist(s)	Jessica Roberts	Great Britain
4	Chiara Consonni	Italy
5	Maria Martins	Portugal
6	Anita Stenberg	Norway
7	Valentine Fortin	France
8	Olivija Baleišytė	Lithuania
9	Barbora Němcová	Czech Republic
10	Babette van der Wolf	Netherlands
11	Alžbeta Bačíková	Slovakia
12	Ida Krum	Denmark
13	Tetyana Klimchenko	Ukraine
14	Laura Rodríguez Cordero	Spain
15	Michelle Andres	Switzerland
16	Mia Griffin	Ireland
17	Patrycja Lorkowska	Poland
18	Argyro Milaki	Greece
