= 2022 UCI Track Cycling World Championships – Women's elimination =

Women's elimination at the 2022 UCI Track Cycling World Championships
- Venue: Vélodrome National
- Location: Saint-Quentin-en-Yvelines, France
- Dates: 13 October
- Competitors: 24 from 24 nations

Medalists
| gold medal | Lotte Kopecky | Belgium |
| silver medal | Rachele Barbieri | Italy |
| bronze medal | Jennifer Valente | United States |

The Women's elimination competition at the 2022 UCI Track Cycling World Championships was held on 13 October 2022.

== Results ==
The race was started at 19:57.

| Rank | Name | Nation |
|---|---|---|
| 1st place, gold medalist(s) | Lotte Kopecky | Belgium |
| 2nd place, silver medalist(s) | Rachele Barbieri | Italy |
| 3rd place, bronze medalist(s) | Jennifer Valente | United States |
| 4 | Lea Lin Teutenberg | Germany |
| 5 | Mylène de Zoete | Netherlands |
| 6 | Sophie Lewis | Great Britain |
| 7 | Tania Calvo | Spain |
| 8 | Sarah Van Dam | Canada |
| 9 | Ruby Roseman-Gannon | Australia |
| 10 | Ally Wollaston | New Zealand |
| 11 | Alice Sharpe | Ireland |
| 12 | Olivija Baleišytė | Lithuania |
| 13 | Kateřina Kohoutková | Czech Republic |
| 14 | Alžbeta Bačíková | Slovakia |
| 15 | Ebtissam Mohamed | Egypt |
| 16 | Argiro Milaki | Greece |
| 17 | Jade Labastugue | France |
| 18 | Yareli Acevedo | Mexico |
| 19 | Yumi Kajihara | Japan |
| 20 | Michelle Andres | Switzerland |
| 21 | Rinata Sultanova | Kazakhstan |
| 22 | Daniela Campos | Portugal |
| 23 | Nikol Płosaj | Poland |
| 24 | Tawakalt Yekeen | Nigeria |
