= 2024 European Road Championships – Women's time trial =

Women's elite time trial
2024 European Road Championships

Race details
- Dates: 11 September 2024
- Stages: 1
- Distance: 31.3 km (19.4 mi)
- Winning time: 39:00.791

Medalists
	Gold	Lotte Kopecky (BEL)
	Silver	Ellen van Dijk (NED)
	Bronze	Christina Schweinberger (AUT)

The women's elite time trial at the 2024 European Road Championships took place on 11 September 2024, in Limburg, Belgium.

Lotte Kopecky won the race for the first time.

== Results ==
Rank	#	Cyclist	Nation	Time	Diff.
1st place, gold medalist(s)	3	Lotte Kopecky	Belgium	39:00.791	
2nd place, silver medalist(s)	13	Ellen van Dijk	Netherlands	39:44.392	+00:43.60
3rd place, bronze medalist(s)	1	Christina Schweinberger	Austria	40:03.760	+01:02.97
4	2	Riejanne Markus	Netherlands	40:05.779	+01:04.98
5	6	Vittoria Guazzini	Italy	40:09.729	+01:08.93
6	18	Katrine Aalerud	Norway	40:25.296	+01:24.50
7	19	Mieke Kröger	Germany	40:49.068	+01:48.27
8	4	Eugenia Bujak	Slovenia	40:52.987	+01:52.19
9	14	Rebecca Koerner	Denmark	41:09.569	+02:08.77
10	12	Anna Kiesenhofer	Austria	41:11.582	+02:10.79
11	8	Lisa Klein	Germany	41:20.220	+02:19.43
12	23	Dana Rožlapa	Latvia	41:23.355	+02:22.56
13	7	Agnieszka Skalniak-Sójka	Poland	41:36.033	+02:35.24
14	5	Elena Hartmann	Switzerland	42:01.696	+03:00.90
15	10	Yuliia Biriukova	Ukraine	42:08.138	+03:07.34
16	15	Noemi Rüegg	Switzerland	42:09.230	+03:08.44
17	16	Sandra Alonso	Spain	42:12.752	+03:11.96
18	22	Rotem Gafinovitz	Israel	42:32.700	+03:31.91
19	21	Caroline Andersson	Sweden	42:35.661	+03:34.87
20	9	Mireia Benito	Spain	42:42.724	+03:41.93
21	17	Marta Jaskulska	Poland	43:02.018	+04:01.22
22	20	Tetiana Yashchenko	Ukraine	43:53.397	+04:52.60
23	11	Hafdís Sigurðardóttir	Iceland	44:55.598	+05:54.80
24	25	Neyran Elden Köşker	Turkey	45:04.936	+06:04.14
25	26	Silja Jóhannesdóttir	Iceland	45:33.713	+06:32.92
26	27	Varvara Fasoi	Greece	45:56.823	+06:56.03
27	24	Petya Minkova	Bulgaria	49:44.008	+10:43.21
