= Lotte Kopecky =

Belgian cyclist (born 1995)

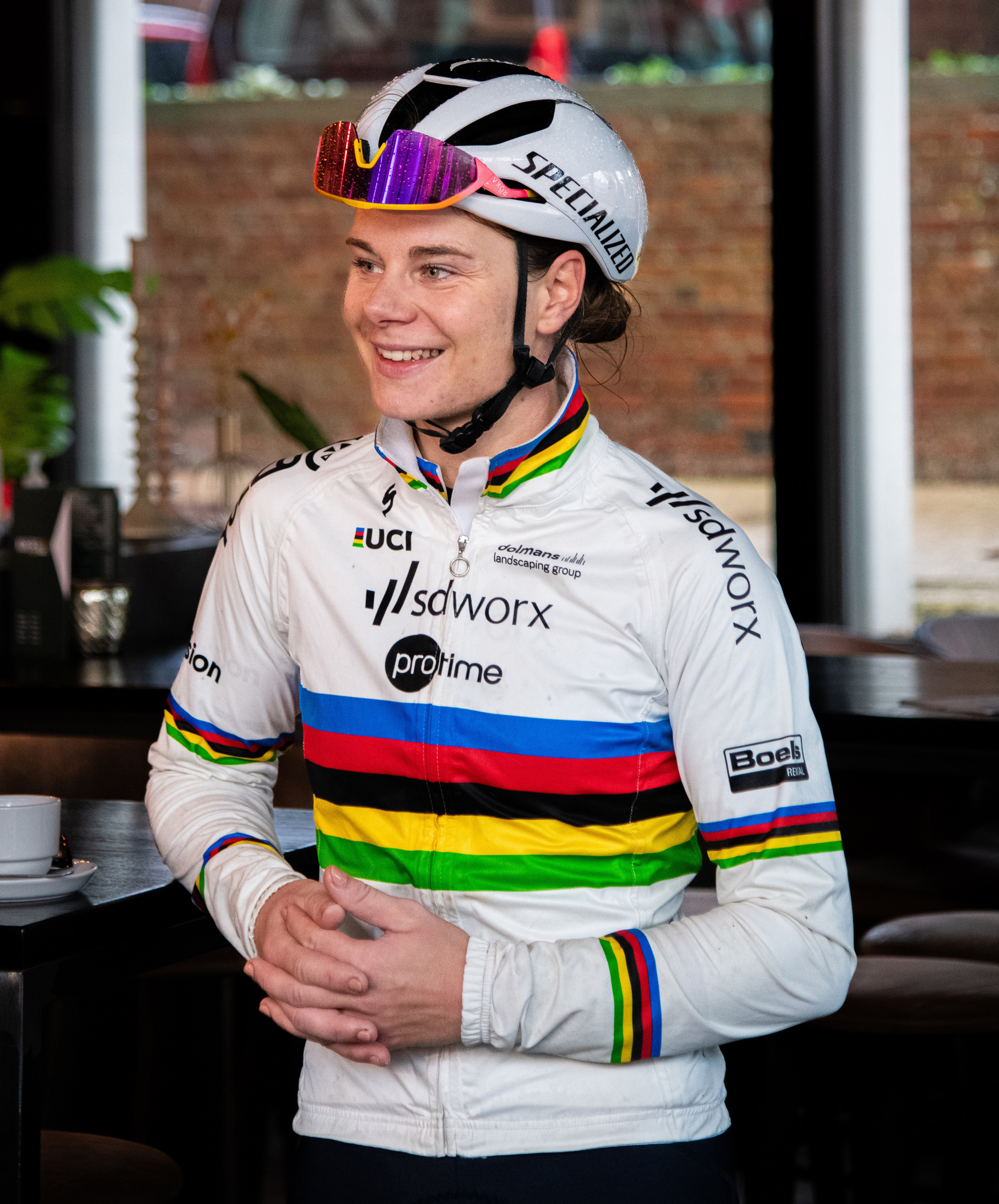
- Kopecky wearing the World Champion jersey in 2023

Personal information
- Born: 10 November 1995 (age 30) Rumst, Flanders, Belgium
- Height: 1.71 m (5 ft 7 in)
- Weight: 66 kg (146 lb)

Cycling career
- Sport: Cycling
- Current team: Team SD Worx–Protime
- Disciplines: Road; Track; Cyclo-cross
- Role: Rider

Professional teams
- 2012–2015: Topsport Vlaanderen–Pro-Duo
- 2016–2020: Lotto–Soudal Ladies
- 2021: Liv Racing
- 2022–: Team SD Worx–Protime

Major wins
- Road Major Tours Tour de France Points classification (2023) 1 individual stage (2023) Giro d'Italia Points classification (2024) 2 individual stages (2020, 2024) La Vuelta Femenina Points classification (2026) 1 individual stage (2026) Stage races Belgium Tour (2021) Thüringen Ladies Tour (2023) UAE Tour (2024) Tour of Britain (2024) Tour de Romandie (2024) Simac Ladies Tour (2023, 2024) One-day races and Classics World Road Race Championship (2023, 2024) European Time Trial Championships (2024) National Road Race Championships (2020, 2021, 2023, 2024) National Time Trial Championships (2019–2025) Tour of Flanders (2022, 2023, 2025) Milan–San Remo (2026) Paris–Roubaix (2024) Strade Bianche (2022, 2024) Le Samyn (2021) Omloop Het Nieuwsblad (2023) Other Vélo d'Or (2024) UCI Women's World Tour (2024) Track World Championships Madison (2017, 2022) Points race (2021, 2023) Elimination (2022, 2023, 2026)
Medal record
Representing Belgium
Women's track cycling
World Championships
Gold medal – first place	2017 Hong Kong	Madison
Gold medal – first place	2021 Roubaix	Points race
Gold medal – first place	2022 Saint-Quentin-en-Yvelines	Elimination
Gold medal – first place	2022 Saint-Quentin-en-Yvelines	Madison
Gold medal – first place	2023 Glasgow	Elimination
Gold medal – first place	2023 Glasgow	Points race
Gold medal – first place	2026 Shanghai	Elimination
Silver medal – second place	2021 Roubaix	Elimination
Silver medal – second place	2021 Roubaix	Omnium
Silver medal – second place	2024 Ballerup	Points race
Silver medal – second place	2024 Ballerup	Elimination
Bronze medal – third place	2023 Glasgow	Omnium
European Championships
Gold medal – first place	2016 Saint-Quentin-en-Yvelines	Madison
Gold medal – first place	2022 Munich	Elimination
Gold medal – first place	2022 Munich	Points race
Gold medal – first place	2023 Grenchen	Elimination
Gold medal – first place	2024 Apeldoorn	Points race
Gold medal – first place	2024 Apeldoorn	Elimination
Gold medal – first place	2026 Konya	Elimination
Gold medal – first place	2026 Konya	Points race
Gold medal – first place	2026 Konya	Madison
Silver medal – second place	2024 Apeldoorn	Madison
Bronze medal – third place	2016 Saint-Quentin-en-Yvelines	Omnium
Bronze medal – third place	2023 Grenchen	Omnium
European U23 Championships
Gold medal – first place	2016 Montichiari	Points race
Gold medal – first place	2016 Montichiari	Omnium
Women's road bicycle racing
Olympic Games
Bronze medal – third place	2024 Paris	Road race
World Championships
Gold medal – first place	2023 Glasgow	Road race
Gold medal – first place	2024 Zurich	Road race
Silver medal – second place	2022 Wollongong	Road race
European Championships
Gold medal – first place	2024 Limburg	Time trial
Bronze medal – third place	2023 Drenthe	Road race
Women's gravel bicycle racing
World Championships
Silver medal – second place	2024 Flemish Brabant	Elite

Lotte Kopecky (Dutch pronunciation: [ˈlɔtə koːˈpɛki]; born 10 November 1995) is a Belgian road and track racing cyclist, who rides for UCI Women's WorldTeam Team SD Worx–Protime, and the 2023 and 2024 UCI Elite Women's World Road Race Champion. She is a multiple world champion on the track, having won six gold medals across four UCI Track Cycling World Championships; she won the madison in 2017 and 2022, the points race in 2021 and 2023, and the elimination race in 2022 and 2023.

== Early life ==
Kopecky started cycling at the age of nine. Like her brother, she focused on cyclo-cross. She then joined the Topsport School which combines sports practice with studies. But since cyclo-cross is not an Olympic discipline, a necessary condition to be part of the curriculum, she switched to road and track cycling.

== Career ==
=== Youth years ===
Aged 16, Kopecky became Belgian junior time trial champion in 2012, and second in the road race. In Valkenburg, Netherlands, she finished 11th in the woman junior's time trial during the 2012 UCI Road World Championships. A year later, she finished seventh and ninth in the time trial and road race at the European Championships in Olomouc, Czech Republic and she won silver at the Belgian Junior Women's Time Trial Championship.

In track cycling, Kopecky achieved good results from her youth. She won several Belgian titles as a novice and junior. In 2012, she rode her first international championship. At the 2013 UEC European Junior Championships, Kopecky won the points race and the individual pursuit, and became third in the team pursuit.

=== 2014-2018 ===
In both 2014 and 2015, she won the golden medal in the national track championships individual pursuit and the silver medal at the national championships for the elite road race.

Kopecky signed for Lotto–Soudal Ladies in November 2015. In May 2016, she won her first professional road race, the Trofee Maarten Wynants. After competing in the time trial and road race at the Olympic Games in Rio de Janeiro, she won the youth classification of the Lotto Belgium Tour in September.

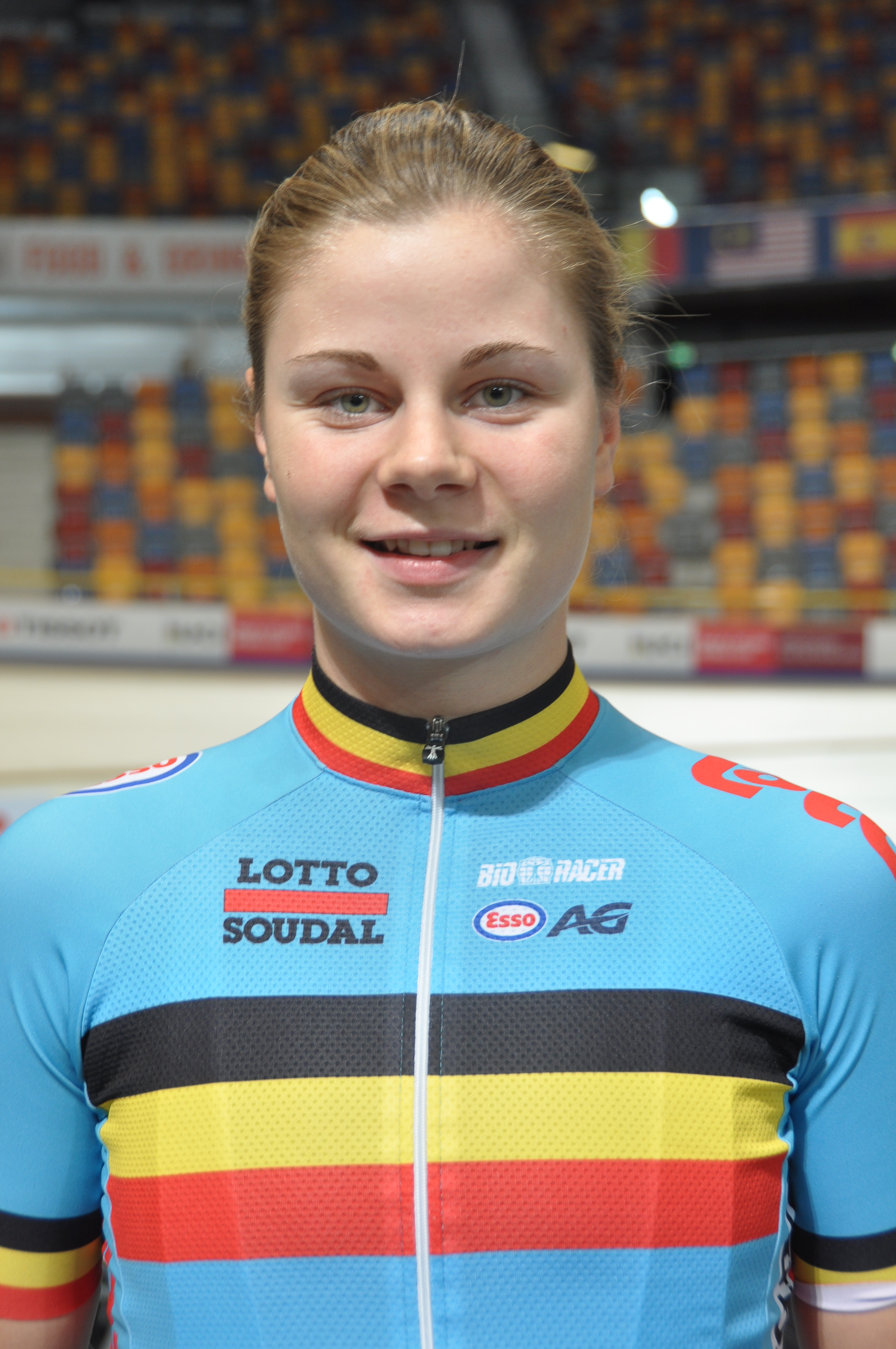
Kopecky in 2016 at the Track Cycling World Cup

That year, she also won the national Under-23 road race and time trial championships, which she also managed to do in 2017. Kopecky also grabbed silver in the 2017 national elite road race.

Lotte Kopecky and Jolien D'Hoore managed to win the golden medal in the Madison discipline at the 2017 UCI Track Cycling World Championships, after they won the European title in 2016.

Kopecky dominated the 2017 national track championships, winning the Omnium, Scratch and Points race.

In 2018, in addition to some places of honor, she won the points classification in the Belgium Tour.

=== 2019–2022 ===
In February 2019, Kopecky managed to win the inaugural Vuelta a la Comunitat Valenciana Feminas. She became the national elite time trial champion later that year. In 2020, she managed to win both the national elite time trial and road race championship. She finished second in Gent–Wevelgem, after Jolien D'Hoore, and third in the Tour of Flanders. Lotte Kopecky participated in the 2020 Summer Olympics in Tokyo, finishing 4th in the individual road race.

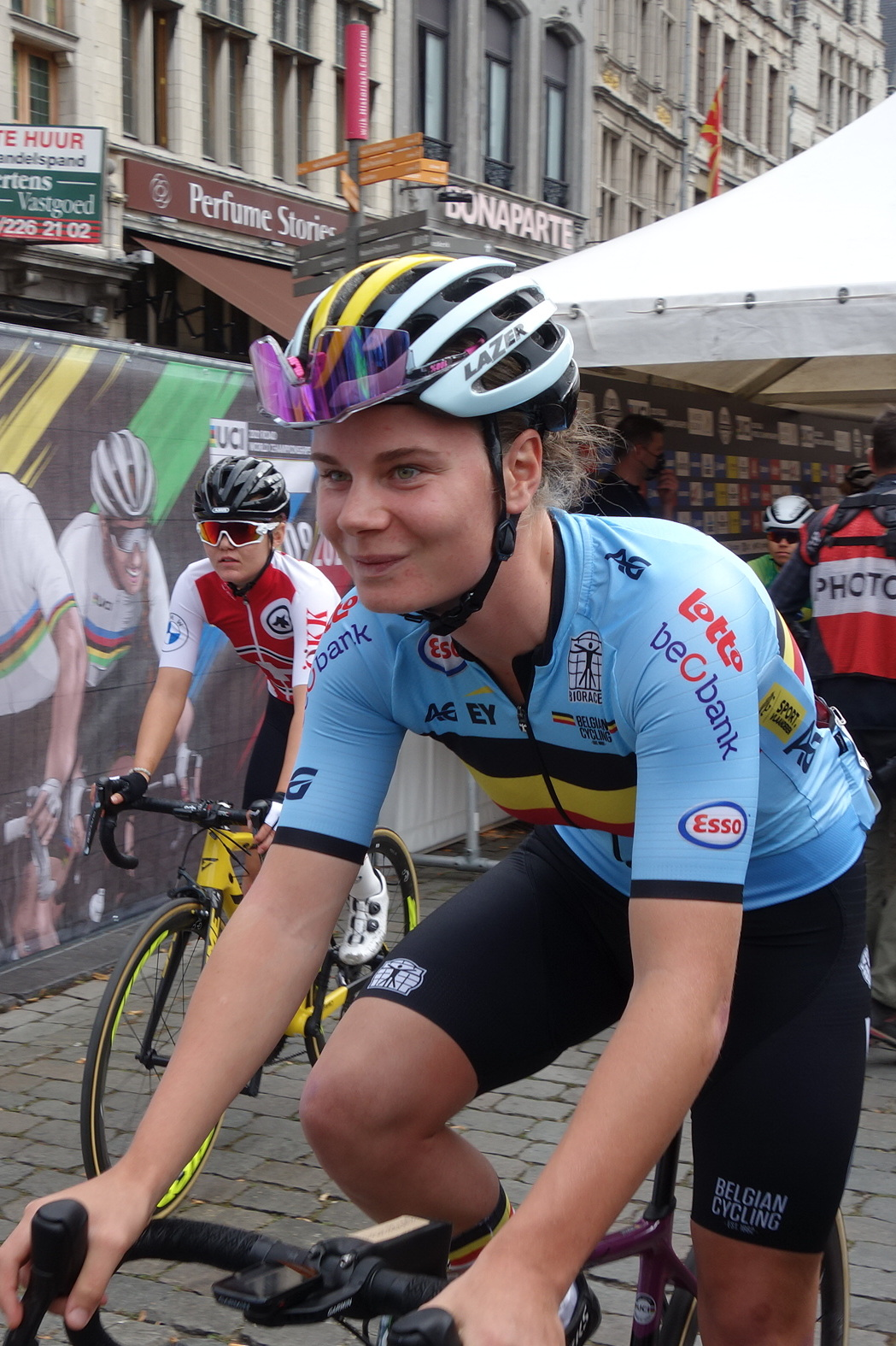
Lotte Kopecky at the 2021 Road World Championships

Kopecky signed with the prestigious SD Worx team in June 2021, believing that she would be surrounded by stronger cyclists. After winning the final stage, she won the general classification of the Belgium Tour, as well as the points classification. She also won the final stage of the Challenge by La Vuelta, and the points classification. And like the year before, Kopecky managed to win both the national time trial and road race championship.

During the 2021 UCI Track Cycling World Championships, she won the golden medal in the Points race, and the silver medal in the Elimination and Omnium disciplines.

In 2022, she won the classics Strade Bianche and Tour of Flanders, and ended as second in Paris–Roubaix Femmes.

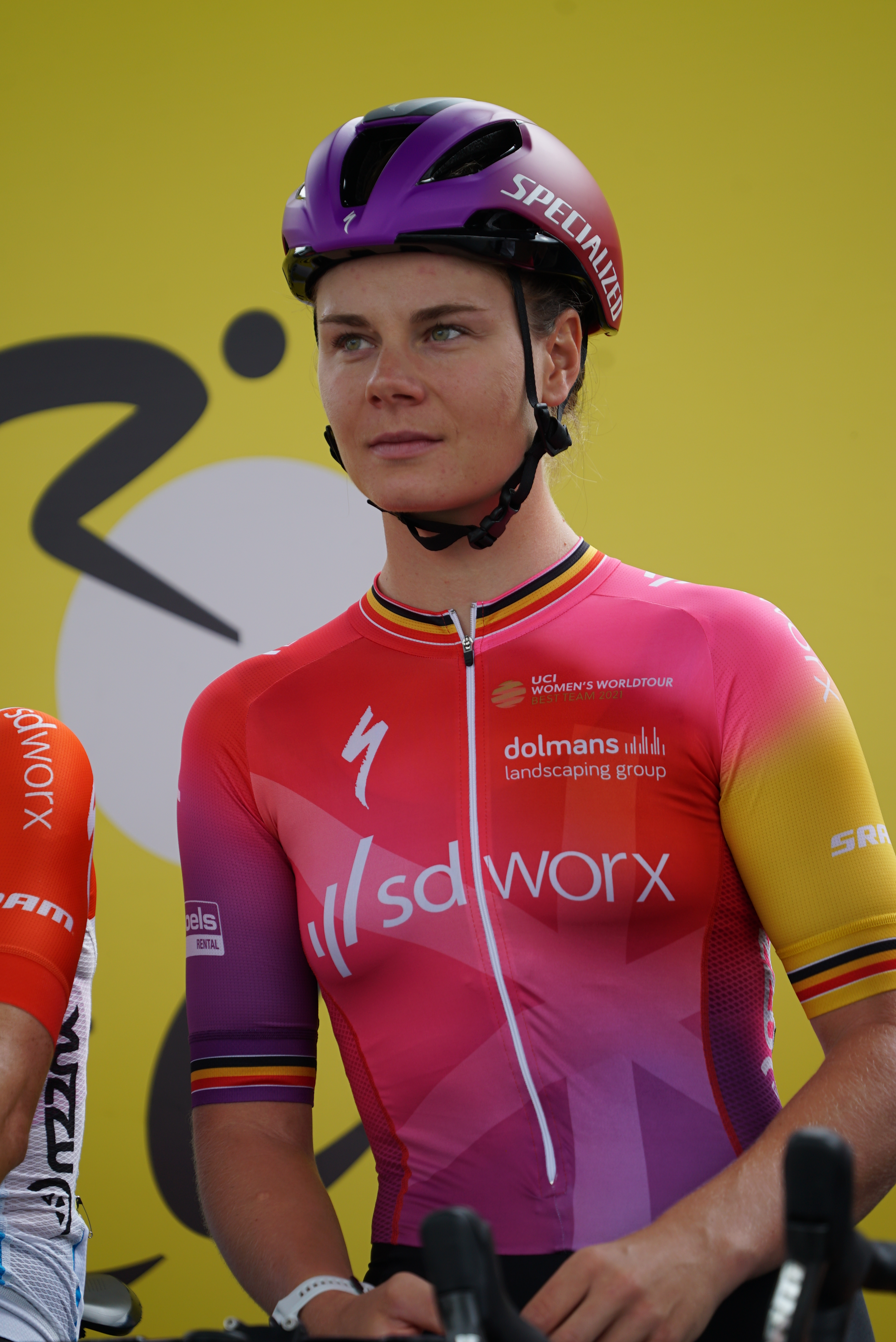
Kopecky at the 2022 Tour de France Femmes

Kopecky won the points classification of the Vuelta a Burgos Feminas and finished as first in one stage. At the world championships road race in Wollongong, Australia, she seemed to be on her way to her first world title, but due to an unexpected attack by Annemiek Van Vleuten she had to settle for a silver medal.

2022 proved to be a successful year in track cycling, with a world title in the Elimination and Madison (with Shari Bossuyt) and a European title in the Elimination and Points race.

In November 2022, after being a couple for more than three years, Kopecky ended her relationship with Kieran De Fauw. As he was also her coach, she decided to continue without a coach and to coach herself.

=== 2023–present ===
Kopecky won the classic 2023 Omloop Het Nieuwsblad and Nokere Koerse, and after an early escape she won the Tour of Flanders for the second time in a row.

She ranked second in the 2023 Tour de France Femmes and won the first stage and the points classification. On 13 August 2023 Kopecky won the Road Race at the World Championships in Balloch, Great Britain. As the big favorite for the final victory, she was able to arrive solo after a nervous race.

Kopecky became World and European champion Elimination and also won the Points race during the 2023 World Track Championships in Glasgow, Scotland. On national level, in the Vlaams Wielercentrum Eddy Merckx, she became Belgian champion in the Individual pursuit, Points race, Omnium, Elimination and Madison (with Shari Bossuyt). After receiving several national and international cycling awards in late 2023, she was also voted Belgian of the Year.

In February 2024, Kopecky extended her contract with SD Worx-Protime until 2028. By then, she already had won the general and sprints classification of the UAE Tour Women. In March, Kopecky won the classic Strade Bianche for a second time, and succeeded herself in Nokere Koerse. She also managed to win Paris–Roubaix Femmes, after a powerful sprint.

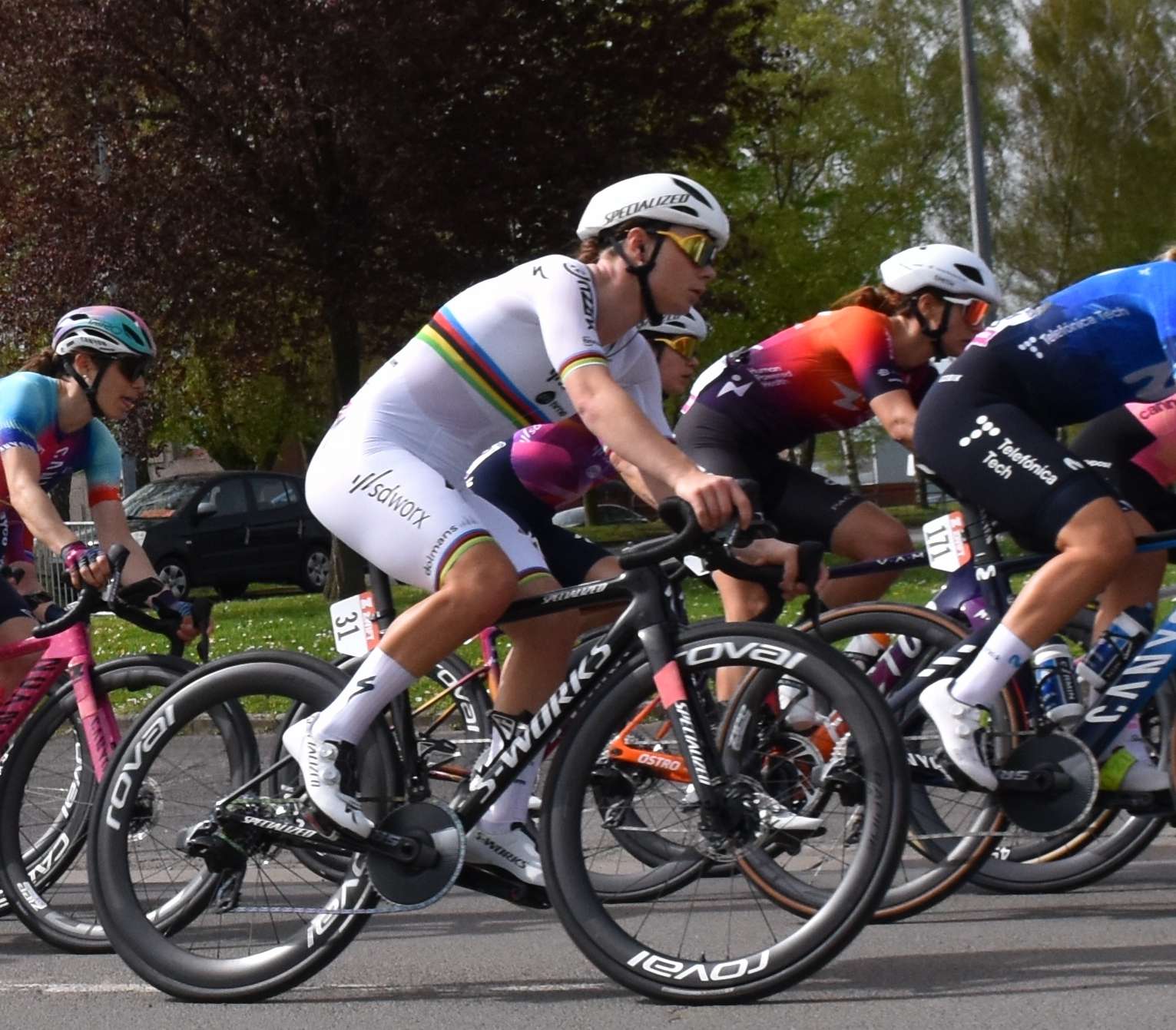
Kopecky in rainbow jersey during the 2024 Paris–Roubaix Femmes

At the Tour of Britain in June 2024, Kopecky won two stages and finished first in the general and points classification. The same month, she won the Belgian road race and time trial championship once more. Kopecky was a big favorite to win the gold medal in the Olympic road race in Paris, but had to settle for a bronze medal. Despite the French doping agency acknowledging that the use of letrozole metabolite was not intentional, her partner Shari Bossuyt was suspended for 2 years. This forced Kopecky to adjust her ambitions for the Madison event at the Olympics and championships to follow.

After winning the general and mountains classifications in the Tour de Romandie, Kopecky won the Time trial at the UEC European Championships. She extended her road race world championship title at the UCI World Championships in Zurich, Switzerland. In the final lap she experienced several difficult moments uphill, but she could handle her race tactically and win the sprint finish. At the 2024 UCI Track Cycling World Championships, Kopecky ended as second in both the Elimination and Points race, finishing her season with nine medals at a major championship.

In 2025, after a winter beset by knee problems, she chose to skip the opening weekend. Kopecky helped her teammate Lorena Wiebes to victory in Milan–San Remo. She herself eventually finished ninth. After previously failing to escape for a solo finish, she also acted as pacemaker for winner Lorena Wiebes in the final of a chaotic Gent–Wevelgem. In Dwars door Vlaanderen, Kopecky ended second after an outstanding Elisa Longo Borgini. Kopecky then won the Tour of Flanders for a record third time, winning in a sprint finish. The rest of the season was "dramatic" as she put it herself: she left the Giro, rode a disappointing Tour de France, skipped the 2025 UCI Road World Championships and a vertebra fracture prevented her from competing at the Track World Championships.

Having skipped the 2025 UEC European Track Championships and missed the 2025 UCI Track Cycling World Championships through injury, Kopecky returned to the track in 2026 and in February won three European titles: Elimination, Points Race and the Madison, which she won together with Shari Bossuyt.

== Personal life ==
Kopecky's great-grandfather was Czech. Off the bike, she enjoys spending time with family and friends and is known for her down-to-earth personality. Her brother struggled with depression and died by suicide in 2023. Kopecky and her family went through a difficult period. She later admitted that she would never have started cycling without him.

"To be honest, I didn't even like cycling. But Seppe did it, I looked up to him, and so I just joined. It was only later that I realized how crazy that choice actually was, because there were many sports that I was good at and I could have chosen another one for the same reason." Kopecky mentioned in a 2023 interview.

Kopecky is married to Axel Merckx, the son of cycling legend Eddy Merckx.

== Career achievements ==
=== Major results ===
==== Road ====
2010
1st Time trial, National Novice Championships
1st Time trial, Antwerp Provincial Novice Championships
2011
1st Time trial, National Novice Championships
1st Time trial, Antwerp Provincial Novice Championships
2012
National Junior Championships

1st Time trial
2nd Road race

UEC European Junior Championships

3rd Time trial
5th Road race

2013
2nd Time trial, National Junior Championships
2nd Time trial, Antwerp Provincial Junior Championships
3rd Road race, Flanders Regional Junior Championships
UEC European Junior Championships

7th Time trial
9th Road race

8th Overall Junior Energiewacht Tour

1st Sprints classification

2014
National Championships

1st Under-23 road race
1st Under-23 time trial
2nd Road race

1st 's Gravenwezel
3rd Kieldrecht–Prosperpolder
10th Diamond Tour
2015
National Championships

1st Under-23 road race
2nd Road race

Antwerp Provincial Championships

1st Time trial
1st Road race

1st Herselt Koerse – Zuidkempense Ladies Classic
2nd Trofee Maarten Wynants
3rd Grote Prijs De Wielkeszuigers
5th Grand Prix de Dottignies
6th Dwars door Vlaanderen
2016
National Under-23 Championships

1st Road race
1st Time trial

1st Trofee Maarten Wynants
National Championships

2nd Road race
2nd Time trial

2nd Gooik–Geraardsbergen–Gooik
4th Overall Belgium Tour

1st Young rider classification

6th Diamond Tour
8th Ljubljana–Domžale–Ljubljana TT
9th La Course by Le Tour de France
10th Gran Premio Bruno Beghelli
2017
National Under-23 Championships

1st Road race
1st Time trial

2nd Road race, National Championships
2nd Acht van Westerveld
5th Omloop van het Hageland
5th Tour of Flanders
5th Dwars door de Westhoek
6th Dwars door Vlaanderen
8th Overall Belgium Tour
9th Trofee Maarten Wynants
2018
2nd Time trial, National Championships
3rd Overall Belgium Tour

1st Points classification
1st Belgian rider classification
1st Stage 1

4th Veenendaal–Veenendaal Classic
5th Diamond Tour
7th Dwars door de Westhoek
2019
1st Time trial, National Championships
1st Vuelta a la Comunitat Valenciana
1st MerXem Classic
2nd Overall Belgium Tour
3rd Overall Tour of Chongming Island
3rd Nokere Koerse
3rd Three Days of Bruges–De Panne
3rd Dwars door de Westhoek
3rd Diamond Tour
4th RideLondon Classique
5th Ronde van Drenthe
6th Gent–Wevelgem
9th Le Samyn
2020
National Championships

1st Road race
1st Time trial

1st Stage 7 Giro Rosa
2nd Gent–Wevelgem
3rd Le Samyn
3rd Tour of Flanders
3rd Three Days of Bruges–De Panne
4th Brabantse Pijl
7th Road race, UEC European Championships
2021
National Championships

1st Road race
1st Time trial

1st Overall Belgium Tour

1st Points classification
1st Stage 3

1st Le Samyn
Challenge by La Vuelta

1st Points classification
1st Stage 4

2nd Overall Thüringen Ladies Tour

1st Sprints classification
1st Stage 4

2nd Gent–Wevelgem
4th Road race, Summer Olympics
4th Omloop Het Nieuwsblad
4th Nokere Koerse
4th Classic Brugge–De Panne
4th Dwars door het Hageland
7th La Classique Morbihan
2022
1st Time trial, National Championships
1st Tour of Flanders
1st Strade Bianche
Vuelta a Burgos

1st Points classification
1st Stage 1

2nd UCI Road World Championships – Women's road race
2nd Paris–Roubaix
2nd Nokere Koerse
3rd Ronde van Drenthe
4th Overall RideLondon Classique
4th Gent–Wevelgem
9th UCI Road World Championships – Women's time trial
9th Classic Brugge–De Panne
2023
1st Road race, UCI World Championships
National Championships

1st Road race
1st Time trial

1st Overall Thüringen Ladies Tour

1st Points classification
1st Stages 1 (TTT) & 6

1st Overall Simac Ladies Tour

1st Stage 2 & 4

1st Tour of Flanders
1st Omloop Het Nieuwsblad
1st Nokere Koerse
1st Arnhem–Veenendaal Classic
1st Dwars door het Hageland
2nd Overall Tour de France

1st Points classification
1st Stage 1
Held after Stages 1–6
Held after Stage 1

2nd Strade Bianche
2nd Amstel Gold Race
3rd Road race, UEC European Championships
7th Paris–Roubaix
2024
1st UCI Road World Championships – Women's road race
1st Time trial, UEC European Championships
National Championships

1st Road race
1st Time trial

1st Overall UCI World Tour
1st Overall Tour of Britain

1st Points classification
1st Stages 1 & 2

1st Overall UAE Tour

1st Stage 3

1st Overall Simac Ladies Tour

1st Stage 6

1st Overall Tour de Romandie
1st Paris–Roubaix
1st Strade Bianche
1st Nokere Koerse
2nd Overall Giro d'Italia

1st Points classification
1st Stage 5

2nd Omloop Het Nieuwsblad
2nd Trofeo Alfredo Binda
Olympic Games

3rd Road race
6th Time trial

4th Dwars door Vlaanderen
5th UCI Road World Championships – Women's time trial
5th Tour of Flanders
2025
1st Time trial, National Championships
1st Tour of Flanders
2nd Dwars door Vlaanderen
5th Liège–Bastogne–Liège
9th Milan–San Remo
2026
1st Milan–San Remo
1st Nokere Koerse
4th Tour of Flanders
4th Paris–Roubaix
La Vuelta Femenina

1st Points classification
1st Stage 4

6th UCI Road World Championships – Women's time trial

===== General classification results timeline =====
Major Tour results timeline
Stage race	2019	2020	2021	2022	2023	2024	2025	2026
La Vuelta Femenina (Note: Known as the Challenge by La Vuelta from 2020 to 2022)	—	—	18	21	—	—	—	
Giro d'Italia	86	DNF	—	42	—	2	DNF	
Tour de France	Race did not exist			38	2	—	45	
Stage race results timeline
Stage race	2019	2020	2021	2022	2023	2024	2025	
Thüringen Ladies Tour	—	—	2	—	1	—	—	
Lotto Belgium Tour	2	—	1	—	NH	—	—	
Holland Ladies Tour	—	—	—	—	1	1	—	
UAE Tour	Race did not exist				—	1	—	
Tour of Britain	—	NH	—	—	NH	1	—	
Tour de Romandie	NH			—	—	1	—	

===== Classics results timeline =====
Monument	2015	2016	2017	2018	2019	2020	2021	2022	2023	2024	2025	2026
Milan-San Remo	Not held										9	1
Tour of Flanders	—	33	5	—	32	3	13	1	1	5	1	4
Paris–Roubaix	Did not exist					NH	15	2	7	1	12	4
Liège–Bastogne–Liège	Did not exist		—	—	—	—	—	—	—	38	5	73
Classic	2015	2016	2017	2018	2019	2020	2021	2022	2023	2024	2025	2026
Omloop Het Nieuwsblad	—	—	11	—	—	—	4	27	1	2	—	39
Strade Bianche	—	—	—	—	—	—	17	1	2	1	—	30
Ronde van Drenthe	—	23	25	—	5	NH	—	3	—	—	NH	
Nokere Koerse	Did not exist				3	NH	4	2	1	1	—	1
Trofeo Alfredo Binda	—	—	—	—	—	—	—	—	—	2	—	7
Classic Brugge–De Panne	Did not exist			—	3	3	4	9	—	—	—	—
Gent–Wevelgem	21	35	16	—	6	2	2	4	70	19	55	—
Dwars door Vlaanderen	6	8	6	—	52	—	—	—	—	4	2	12
Amstel Gold Race	—	—	—	—	—	NH	—	—	2	77	34	—
La Flèche Wallonne	—	—	—	—	—	—	—	—	—	15	12	—
GP de Plouay	—	—	—	—	—	23	—	—	—	—	—	

===== Major championships results timeline =====
Event		2014	2015	2016	2017	2018	2019	2020	2021	2022	2023	2024	2025	2026
Olympic Games	Time trial	Not held		21	Not held				—	Not held		6	Not held	
Olympic Games	Road race	Not held		45	Not held				4	Not held		3	Not held	
World Championships	Time trial	—	—	—	—	—	—	—	—	9	—	5	—	6
World Championships	Road race	—	—	75	—	—	—	—	16	2	1	1	—	20
World Championships	Team relay	Did not exist					—	NH	7	—	—	—	—	—
European Championships	Time trial	Did not exist		—	—	—	—	—	—	—	5	1	—	—
European Championships	Road race	Did not exist		—	—	—	11	7	14	—	3	—	—	—
European Championships	Team relay	Did not exist					4	—	—	NH	—	—	—	—
National Championships	Time trial	—	6	2	—	2	1	1	1	1	1	1	1	4
National Championships	Road race	2	2	2	2	7	58	1	1	51	1	1	17	2

Legend
—	Did not compete
DNF	Did not finish
NH	Not held

==== Track ====
2010
National Novice Championships

1st Individual pursuit
2nd Team pursuit
3rd Omnium
3rd Scratch

2011
National Novice Championships

2nd Team sprint
3rd Team pursuit
3rd Keirin
3rd Individual pursuit

2012
National Junior Championships

2nd Individual pursuit
2nd Team pursuit
3rd Points race
3rd Keirin

2013
UEC European Junior Championships

1st Points race
1st Individual pursuit
3rd Team pursuit

National Junior Championships

2nd Omnium
2nd Team pursuit
3rd Points race

2014
National Championships

1st Individual pursuit
3rd 500m time trial
3rd Keirin
3rd Points race

3 Jours d'Aigle

1st Individual pursuit
1st Scratch
2nd Points race

Belgian Xmas Meetings

1st Individual pursuit
2nd Points race
2nd Scratch

3rd Individual pursuit, UEC European Under-23 Championships
3rd Scratch, Open des Nations sur Piste de Roubaix
3rd Individual pursuit, International Belgian Open
2015
National Championships

1st Individual pursuit
2nd Scratch
2nd Omnium
2nd Points race

3 Jours d'Aigle

1st Individual pursuit
2nd Scratch

2nd Scratch, UCI World Cup, Cali
2016
UEC European Championships

1st Madison (with Jolien D'Hoore)
3rd Omnium

UEC European Under-23 Championships

1st Points race
1st Omnium

National Championships

1st Omnium
2nd Scratch
2nd Individual pursuit
2nd Points race

1st Omnium, Six Days of Ghent
Grand Prix of Poland

1st Points race
3rd Team pursuit

2nd Omnium, UCI World Cup, Glasgow
Revolution Series, Glasgow

2nd Scratch
3rd Points race

2017
1st Madison, UCI World Championships (with Jolien D'Hoore)
2016–17 UCI World Cup

1st Overall, Omnium
1st Omnium, Cali

2017–18 UCI World Cup

1st Points race, Pruszków
1st Madison, Pruszków
2nd Madison, Manchester

National Championships

1st Omnium
1st Points race
1st Scratch

Belgian International Track Meeting

1st Madison
3rd Omnium

Zesdaagse Vlaanderen-Gent

2nd Madison
3rd Omnium

2018
International Belgian Track Meeting

1st Madison
1st Omnium

UCI World Cup

3rd Madison, Berlin
3rd Madison, London

2019
UCI World Cup

1st Madison, Cambridge
2nd Madison, Hong Kong

2021
UCI World Championships

1st Points race
2nd Elimination
2nd Omnium

2022
UCI World Championships

1st Madison (with Shari Bossuyt)
1st Elimination

UEC European Championships

1st Elimination
1st Points race

2023
UCI World Championships

1st Elimination
1st Points race
3rd Omnium

UEC European Championships

1st Elimination
3rd Omnium

National Championships

1st Individual pursuit
1st Points race
1st Omnium
1st Elimination
1st Madison (with Shari Bossuyt)

2024
UEC European Championships

1st Elimination
1st Points race
2nd Madison

UCI World Championships

2nd Elimination
2nd Points race

2026
1st Elimination, UCI World Championships
UEC European Championships

1st Elimination
1st Points race
1st Madison (with Shari Bossuyt)

==== Cyclo-cross ====
2020–2021
2nd National Championships

==== Gravel ====
2024
2nd UCI World Championships

=== Honours and awards ===
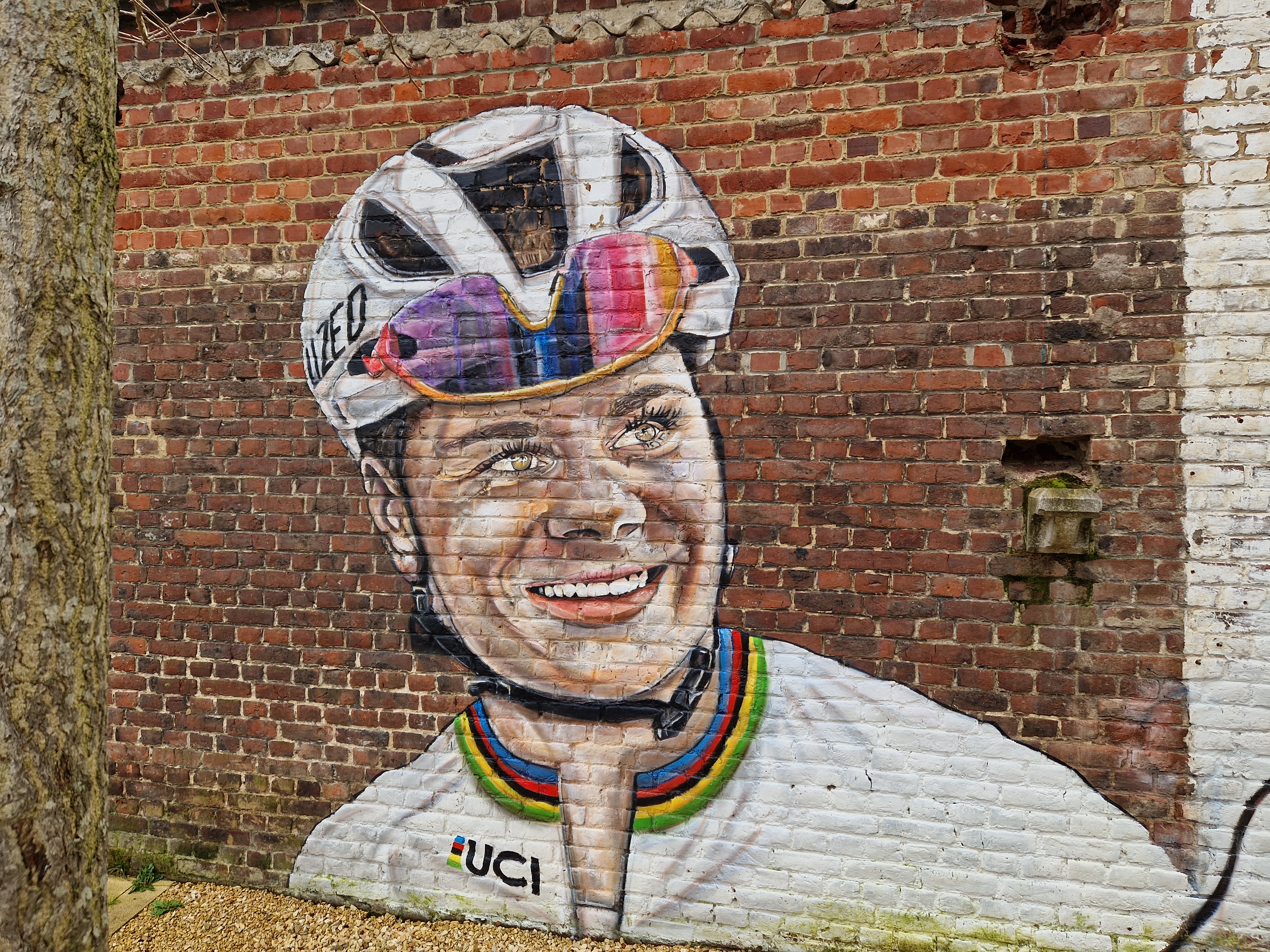
Mural in Roeselare, Belgium

- Belgian Promising Talent of the Year: 2017
- Flandrienne of the Year: 2020, 2021, 2022, 2023, 2024
- Crystal Bicycle: 2020, 2021, 2022, 2023, 2024, 2025
- Trophy Patrick Sercu: 2022
- Eddy Merckx Trophy: 2023, 2024
- Belgian Sportswoman of the Year: 2023
- Flemish Sportsjewel: 2023
- HLN/VTM Belgian of the Year: 2023
- Belgian National Sports Merit Award: 2024
- Vélo d'Or: 2024, runner-up: 2022, 2023
