= 2022 UEC European Track Championships – Women's points race =

Women's points race at the 2022 UEC European Track Championships
- Venue: Messe München, Munich
- Date: 14 August
- Winning points: 85

Medalists
gold medal	Lotte Kopecky	Belgium
silver medal	Silvia Zanardi	Italy
bronze medal	Victoire Berteau	France

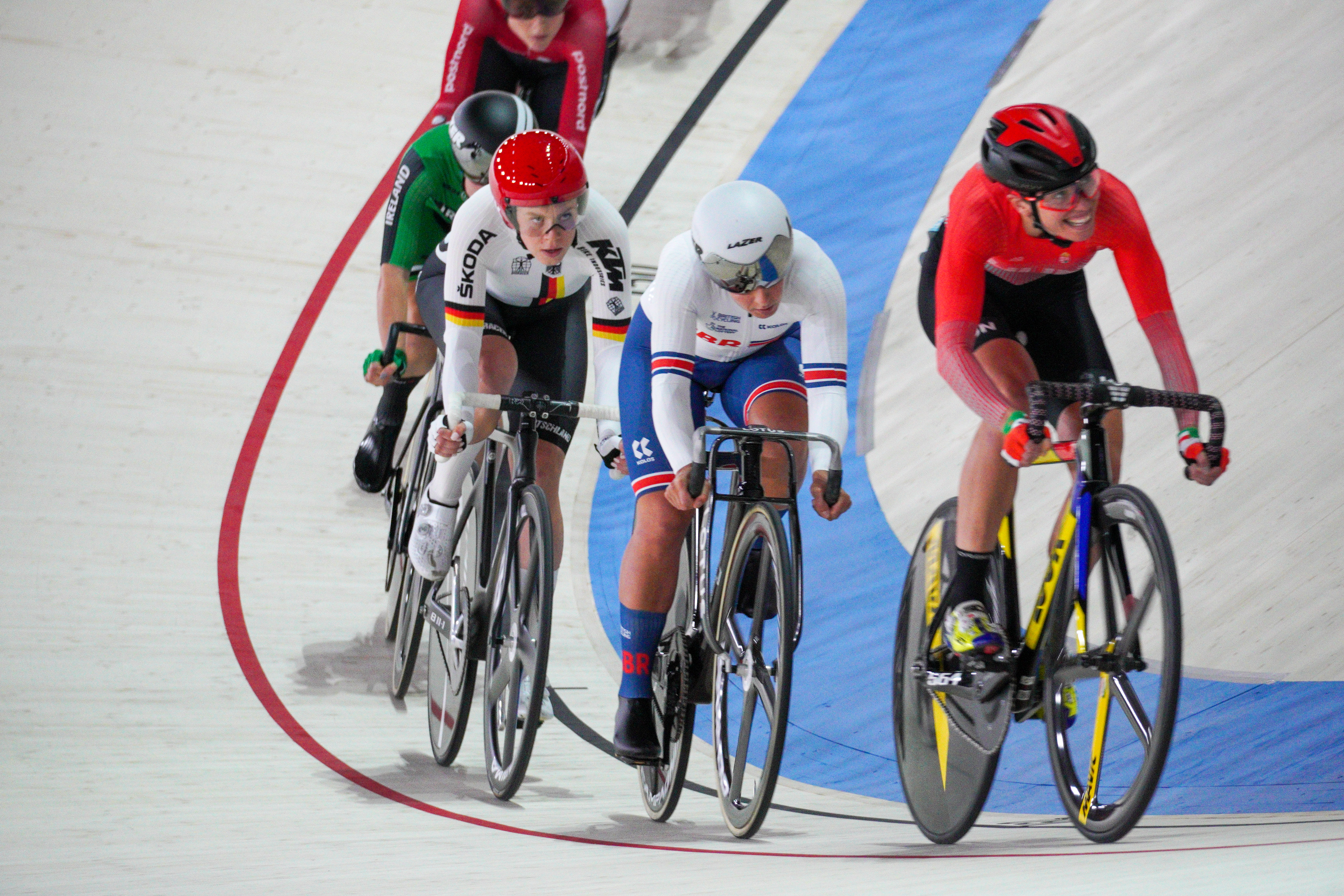
Track Elite European Championships

The women's points race competition at the 2022 UEC European Track Championships was held on 14 August 2022.

== Results ==
125 laps (25 km) will be raced with 12 sprints.

Rank	Name	Nation	Lap points	Sprint points	Finish order	Total points
1st place, gold medalist(s)	Lotte Kopecky	Belgium	60	25	13	85
2nd place, silver medalist(s)	Silvia Zanardi	Italy	20	33	2	53
3rd place, bronze medalist(s)	Victoire Berteau	France	20	27	1	47
4	Julie Leth	Denmark	20	10	5	30
5	Neah Evans	Great Britain	0	25	3	25
6	Daniela Campos	Portugal	20	0	8	20
7	Ganna Solovei	Ukraine	20	0	10	20
8	Anita Stenberg	Norway	0	8	7	8
9	Mia Griffin	Ireland	0	7	6	7
10	Lonneke Uneken	Netherlands	0	0	14	0
11	Nikol Płosaj	Poland	–20	2	4	–18
12	Lena Charlotte Reißner	Germany	–20	1	9	–19
13	Kathrin Schweinberger	Austria	–40	3	12	–37
14	Ziortza Isasi	Spain	–60	2	11	–58
	Johanna Kitti Borissza	Hungary	–20	0	–	DNF
	Léna Mettraux	Switzerland	–20	0	–	DNF
	Tereza Medveďová	Slovakia	–20	0	–	DNF
