= 2021 UCI Track Cycling World Championships – Women's points race =

Women's points race at the 2021 UCI Track Cycling World Championships
- Venue: Vélodrome Couvert Régional Jean Stablinski
- Location: Roubaix, France
- Dates: 24 October
- Competitors: 20 from 20 nations
- Winning points: 76

Medalists
gold medal	Lotte Kopecky	Belgium
silver medal	Katie Archibald	Great Britain
bronze medal	Kirsten Wild	Netherlands

The Women's points race competition at the 2021 UCI Track Cycling World Championships was held on 24 October 2021.

== Results ==
The race was started at 13:56. 100 (25 km) laps were raced with 10 sprints.

Rank	Name	Nation	Lap points	Sprint points	Total points
1st place, gold medalist(s)	Lotte Kopecky	Belgium	60	16	76
2nd place, silver medalist(s)	Katie Archibald	Great Britain	40	32	72
3rd place, bronze medalist(s)	Kirsten Wild	Netherlands	40	20	60
4	Marion Borras	France	40	14	54
5	Silvia Zanardi	Italy	40	11	51
6	Maria Martins	Portugal	40	1	41
7	Jennifer Valente	United States	20	13	33
8	Anita Stenberg	Norway	20	2	22
9	Karolina Karasiewicz	Poland	20	2	22
10	Hanna Solovey	Ukraine	20	0	20
11	Verena Eberhardt	Austria	0	2	2
12	Maggie Coles-Lyster	Canada	0	2	2
13	Nastassia Kiptsikava	Belarus	0	1	1
14	Yareli Acevedo	Mexico	0	0	0
15	Lena Mettraux	Switzerland	0	0	0
16	Johanna Kitti Borissza	Hungary	0	0	0
17	Jarmila Machačová	Czech Republic	0	0	0
18	Tania Calvo	Spain	−20	5	−15
19	Tereza Medveďová	Slovakia	−40	0	−40
–	Fanny Cauchois	Laos	−40	Did not finish	
–	Gulnaz Khatuntseva	Russian Cycling Federation	Did not start		
