= Flandrien of the Year =

Belgian cycling award

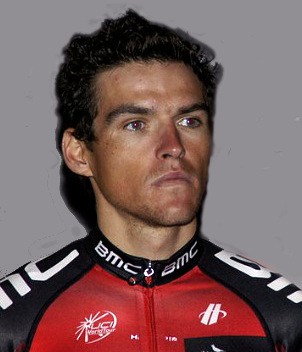
- Greg Van Avermaet, six time Flandrien of the Year (2008, 2013, 2014, 2015, 2016, 2017)
- Presented by: Het Nieuwsblad
- First award: 2003
- Current Holders: (Belgium) Jasper Philipsen (Belgium) Lotte Kopecky

Highlights
- Most awards: (Belgium) Greg Van Avermaet (6 wins)
- International Flandrien of the Year: (Netherlands) Mathieu van der Poel

The Flandrien of the Year (Dutch: Flandrien-Trofee) is an annual award presented by the Flemish newspaper Het Nieuwsblad to the best Belgian cyclist of the year. The prize has been awarded since 2003 and was originally awarded based on a vote by the public, and open to any nationality. The first winner of the award was the Italian Paolo Bettini. Since 2008, separate awards were created for the best Belgian cyclist, the best international cyclist, and the best Belgian female cyclist (Flandrienne of the Year). Also since 2008, the voting system was changed and only people from within the world of cycling choose the winners from a jury's list of nominees. Since 2014, an award for best international cyclo-cross cyclist was added. This latter award was replaced in 2019 by the Trophy Patrick Sercu in honour of the Belgian rider who died that year. The Trophy Patrick Sercu is awarded to the best non-road race cyclist.

The award is seen as prestigious in the world of cycling, especially since it is voted on by fellow cyclists. It is also seen as rewarding the cyclist who most embodies the tough and hard-working values of the Flandrien cyclists of years gone by, such as Briek Schotte. International Flandrien of the Year 2013 Chris Froome summed up these sentiments when he accepted the award, saying: "A Flandrien is to me someone, no matter how tough the conditions are, never gives up. Someone who has the character of a fighter."

== Road Race Winners ==
=== (Open) Flandrien of the Year (2003–2007) ===
Year	Country	Rider	Team
2003	Italy	Paolo Bettini	Quick-Step–Davitamon
2004	Belgium	Tom Boonen	Quick-Step–Davitamon
2005	Belgium	Tom Boonen	Quick-Step–Innergetic
2006	Italy	Paolo Bettini	Quick-Step–Innergetic
2007	Italy	Paolo Bettini	Quick-Step–Innergetic

=== (Belgian) Flandrien of the Year (2008–) ===
Year	Country	Rider	Team
2008	Belgium	Greg Van Avermaet	Silence–Lotto
2009	Belgium	Philippe Gilbert	Silence–Lotto
2010	Belgium	Philippe Gilbert	Omega Pharma–Lotto
2011	Belgium	Philippe Gilbert	Omega Pharma–Lotto
2012	Belgium	Tom Boonen	Omega Pharma–Quick-Step
2013	Belgium	Greg Van Avermaet	BMC Racing Team
2014	Belgium	Greg Van Avermaet	BMC Racing Team
2015	Belgium	Greg Van Avermaet	BMC Racing Team
2016	Belgium	Greg Van Avermaet	BMC Racing Team
2017	Belgium	Greg Van Avermaet	BMC Racing Team
2018	Belgium	Yves Lampaert	Quick-Step Floors
2019	Belgium	Wout Van Aert	Team Jumbo–Visma
2020	Belgium	Wout Van Aert	Team Jumbo–Visma
2021	Belgium	Wout Van Aert	Team Jumbo–Visma
2022	Belgium	Remco Evenepoel	Quick-Step Alpha Vinyl Team
2023	Belgium	Jasper Philipsen	Alpecin–Deceuninck
2024	Belgium	Remco Evenepoel	Soudal–Quick-Step
2025	Belgium	Remco Evenepoel	Soudal–Quick-Step

=== International Flandrien of the Year (2008–) ===
Year	Country	Rider	Team
2008	Switzerland	Fabian Cancellara	Team CSC Saxo Bank
2009	Great Britain	Mark Cavendish	Team Columbia–High Road
2010	Switzerland	Fabian Cancellara	Team Saxo Bank
2011	Great Britain	Mark Cavendish	HTC–Highroad
2012	Great Britain	Bradley Wiggins	Team Sky
2013	Great Britain	Chris Froome	Team Sky
2014	Poland	Michał Kwiatkowski	Omega Pharma–Quick-Step
2015	Slovakia	Peter Sagan	Tinkoff–Saxo
2016	Slovakia	Peter Sagan	Tinkoff
2017	Great Britain	Chris Froome	Team Sky
2018	Netherlands	Tom Dumoulin	Team Sunweb
2019	France	Julian Alaphilippe	Deceuninck–Quick-Step
2021	Slovenia	Tadej Pogačar	UAE Team Emirates
2022	Slovenia	Tadej Pogačar	UAE Team Emirates
2023	Netherlands	Mathieu van der Poel	Alpecin–Deceuninck

==== By country ====
Country	Number of wins	Winning years
Great Britain	5	2009, 2011, 2012, 2013, 2017
Switzerland	2	2008, 2010
Slovakia	2	2015, 2016
Slovenia	2	2021, 2022
Netherlands	2	2018, 2023
Poland	1	2014
France	1	2019

=== (Belgian) Flandrienne of the Year (2008–) ===
Year	Country	Rider	Team
2008	Belgium	Grace Verbeke	Lotto–Belisol Ladiesteam
2009	Belgium	Grace Verbeke	Lotto–Belisol Ladiesteam
2010	Belgium	Liesbet De Vocht	Nederland bloeit
2011	Belgium	Grace Verbeke	Topsport Vlaanderen-Ridley Team
2012	Belgium	Liesbet De Vocht	Rabobank Women Team
2013	Belgium	Jessie Daams	Boels–Dolmans
2014	Belgium	Jolien D'Hoore	Lotto–Belisol Ladies
2015	Belgium	Jolien D'Hoore	Wiggle–Honda
2016	Belgium	Jolien D'Hoore	Wiggle High5
2017	Belgium	Sanne Cant	Beobank–Corendon
2018	Belgium	Sanne Cant	Corendon–Circus
2019	Belgium	Sofie De Vuyst	Parkhotel Valkenburg
2020	Belgium	Lotte Kopecky	Lotto–Soudal Ladies
2021	Belgium	Lotte Kopecky	Liv Racing
2022	Belgium	Lotte Kopecky	SD Worx
2023	Belgium	Lotte Kopecky	SD Worx
2024	Belgium	Lotte Kopecky	Team SD Worx–Protime
2025	Belgium	Lotte Kopecky	Team SD Worx–Protime

=== International Flandrienne of the Year (2022–) ===
Year	Country	Rider	Team
2022	Netherlands	Annemiek van Vleuten	Movistar Team

== Non-Road Race Winners ==
=== Flandrien of the Cyclo-Cross (2014–2018) ===
Year	Country	Rider	Team
2014	Belgium	Sven Nys	Crelan-AA Drink
2015	Netherlands	Mathieu van der Poel	BKCP–Powerplus
2016	Belgium	Wout Van Aert	Crelan–Vastgoedservice
2017	Netherlands	Mathieu van der Poel	Beobank–Corendon
2018	Netherlands	Mathieu van der Poel	Corendon–Circus

=== Trophy Patrick Sercu (2019–) ===
Year	Country	Rider	Team
2019	Belgium	Victor Campenaerts	Lotto–Soudal
2021	Belgium	Tim Celen	Ploeg Kemp Sports Paracycling
2022	Belgium	Lotte Kopecky	SD Worx
2023	Belgium	Lotte Kopecky	SD Worx

== Lifetime Achievement Award ==
Year	Country	Rider	Team
2016	Switzerland	Fabian Cancellara	Trek–Segafredo
2021	Belgium	Jolien D'Hoore	-
2023	Slovakia	Peter Sagan	-
2023	Belgium	Greg Van Avermaet	-

== Spark of the Year ==
Year	Date	Winner	Team	Performance
2023	29 July	Lotte Kopecky (BEL)	SD Worx	Stage 7 of the Tour de France Femmes
