= 2026 UEC European Track Championships – Women's points race =

Women's points race at the 2026 UEC Track Elite European Championships
- Venue: Konya Velodrome, Konya
- Date: 2 February
- Competitors: 22 from 22 nations
- Winning points: 45

Medalists
gold medal	Lotte Kopecky	Belgium
silver medal	Victoire Berteau	France
bronze medal	Sofie van Rooijen	Netherlands

The women's points race competition at the 2026 UEC European Track Championships was held on 4 February 2026.

== Results ==
100 laps (25 km) were raced with 10 sprints.

Rank	Name	Nation	Lap points	Sprint points	Finish order	Total points
1st place, gold medalist(s)	Lotte Kopecky	Belgium	20	25	17	45
2nd place, silver medalist(s)	Victoire Berteau	France	20	18	3	38
3rd place, bronze medalist(s)	Sofie van Rooijen	Netherlands	20	13	12	33
4	Palina Konrad	Individual Neutral Athletes	20	5	7	25
5	Aline Seitz	Switzerland	0	16	1	16
6	Valeriya Valgonen	Individual Neutral Athletes	0	10	2	10
7	Anita Stenberg	Norway	0	9	8	9
8	Wiktoria Pikulik	Poland	0	4	5	4
9	Lena Charlotte Reißner	Germany	0	4	6	4
10	Imogen Wolff	Great Britain	−20	5	11	−15
11	Laura Rodríguez	Spain	−20	0	14	−20
12	Gwen Nothum	Luxembourg	−20	0	15	−20
13	Akvilė Gedraitytė	Lithuania	−40	5	16	−35
14	Anita Baima	Italy	−40	4	4	−36
15	Barbora Němcová	Czech Republic	−40	0	9	−40
16	Lucy Nelson	Bulgaria	−40	0	10	−40
17	Daniela Campos	Portugal	−40	0	13	−40
18	Laura Auerbach-Lind	Denmark	−40	0	18	−40
19	Nora Jenčušová	Slovakia	−20	0	–	DNF
19	Sevim Gerçek	Turkey	−40	0	–	DNF
19	Tetiana Yashchenko	Ukraine	−40	0	–	DNF
–	Esther Wong	Ireland	−20	3	–	ABD
