= Tsuyaka Uchino =

Japanese cyclist (born 2002)

Tsuyaka Uchino OLY
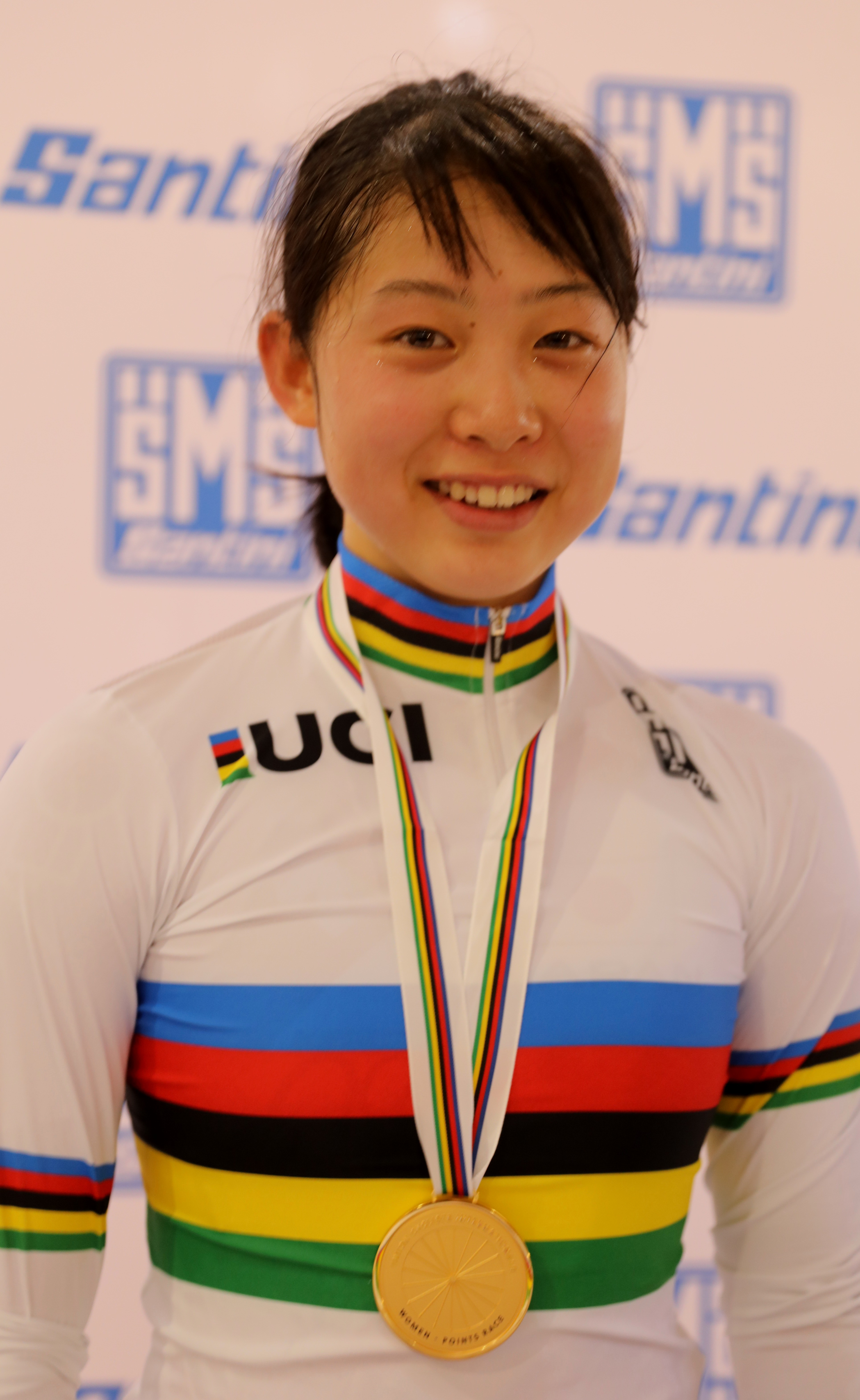
- Uchino at the 2019 UCI Junior Track Cycling World Championships

Personal information
- Born: 13 January 2002 (age 24) Fukuoka, Japan
- Height: 162 cm (5 ft 4 in)
- Weight: 62 kg (137 lb)

Cycling career
- Sport: Cycling
- Current team: NEXETIS
- Discipline: Track
- Role: Rider

Professional teams
- 2022–2025: Team Rakuten K Dreams
- 2025–: NEXETIS
Medal record
Representing Japan
Women's track cycling
Event	1st	2nd	3rd
World Championships	0	1	2
World Junior Championships	1	0	0
Asian Games	3	1	0
Asian Championships	12	2	1
Total	16	4	3
World Championships
Silver medal – second place	2026 Shanghai	Omnium
Bronze medal – third place	2023 Glasgow	Points race
Bronze medal – third place	2026 Shanghai	Madison
Asian Games
Gold medal – first place	2022 Hangzhou	Madison
Gold medal – first place	2022 Hangzhou	Team pursuit
Gold medal – first place	2026 Aichi–Nagoya	Madison
Silver medal – second place	2026 Aichi–Nagoya	Team pursuit
Asian Championships
Gold medal – first place	2022 New Delhi	Madison
Gold medal – first place	2022 New Delhi	Omnium
Gold medal – first place	2022 New Delhi	Points race
Gold medal – first place	2023 Nilai	Madison
Gold medal – first place	2023 Nilai	Elimination
Gold medal – first place	2023 Nilai	Team pursuit
Gold medal – first place	2024 New Delhi	Points race
Gold medal – first place	2024 New Delhi	Madison
Gold medal – first place	2024 New Delhi	Team pursuit
Gold medal – first place	2025 Nilai	Elimination
Gold medal – first place	2025 Nilai	Team pursuit
Gold medal – first place	2025 Nilai	Madison
Silver medal – second place	2026 Tagaytay	Individual pursuit
Silver medal – second place	2026 Tagaytay	Team pursuit
Bronze medal – third place	2026 Tagaytay	Scratch
World Junior Championships
Gold medal – first place	2019 Frankfurt	Points race
Women's road bicycle racing
Asian Championships
Silver medal – second place	2025 Phitsanulok	Mixed team relay
Bronze medal – third place	2025 Phitsanulok	Time trial

Tsuyaka Uchino (内野 艶和, Uchino Tsuyaka; born 13 January 2002) is a Japanese racing cyclist representing NEXETIS at professional level and the Japanese national cycling team. She won a bronze medal in the points race at the 2023 UCI Track Cycling World Championships and competed at the 2024 Summer Olympics.

== Career ==
=== Junior years ===
Uchino played basketball in elementary and middle school, and started cycling after entering Yusei High School. She won the scratch and individual road races at the All Japan High School Selection Championships two years in a row, won the individual pursuit and won the 2000 m individual pursuit event at the Inter-High School Championships.

=== Professional years (2022–present) ===
On January 16, 2020, she passed her 120th training test. She placed third in the training races (29 wins) and second in the final of the graduation race.

On May 1, 2021, she made her debut in the seventh race of the rookie race "Keirin Rookie Series 2021" at Shizuoka Keirin Stadium, where she placed third. She won his first race the following day on May 2, and then won her first championship in the final on May 3. On November 17, she won her third race at Takeo FII (Morning). This was her first victory since his full debut in July, and the first of the 120th class to win since her full debut.

Alongside keirin, she is also active in road cycling. Together with fellow athlete Miho Yoshikawa, Uchino has been designated as a "B" designated athlete for middle-distance track racing by the Japan Cycling Federation (later upgraded to an "A" designated athlete). She is also a member of the national team, and competed as part of the "Team Rakuten K Dreams" between 2022 and 2025.

In the cycling events of the 2024 Paris Olympics, Uchino competed in the women's team pursuit qualifying with Yumi Kajihara, Mizuki Ikeda and Maho Kakita, finishing in a time of 4 minutes 13.818 seconds, which broke the Japanese record, but she was eliminated in the qualifying round in 10th place overall. She also competed in the women's Madison with Maho Kakita, finishing 12th out of 15 teams.
