= Petya Minkova =

Bulgarian cyclist

Cycling career
- Sport: Cycling
- Current team: Nessebar–Vereia
- Role: Rider

Amateur team
- 2020–: Nessebar–Vereia

Major wins
- One day races & Classics National Road Race Championships (2020) National Time Trial Championships (2020)

Petya Minkova is a Bulgarian professional racing cyclist.

== Major results ==
2022
National Road Championships

1st Road Race
1st Time Trial

2021
National Road Championships

1st Road Race
2nd Road Race

2020
National Road Championships

1st Road Race
1st Time Trial
