= Yuli van der Molen =

Dutch cyclist

Personal information
- Born: 23 May 2003 (age 23) Zaanstad, Netherlands

Cycling career
- Sport: Cycling
- Disciplines: Road, Track
- Role: Rider

Professional teams
- 2022-2023: AG Insurance–Soudal NXTG
- 2024: Proximus–Cyclis
- 2025: WV Schijndel
- 2026: O'Shea Redchilli Bikes
Medal record
Women's track cycling
Representing the Netherlands
European Under-23 Championships
Silver medal – second place	2025 Anadia	Madison
European Junior Championships
Bronze medal – third place	2021 Apeldoorn	Madison

Yuli van der Molen (born 23 May 2003) is a Dutch track and road cyclist. She rides for O'Shea Redchilli Bikes.

== Biography ==
Van der Molen rode for the DTS, the Zaanland cycling club, before joining the AG Insurance-NXTG’s under-23 team in 2022. Racing on the track alongside Nienke Veenhoven, she won bronze medals in the Madison at the 2021 European Junior Track Championships, and at the senior Dutch National Track Cycling Championships in December 2023.

Van der Molen received a Hodgkin lymphoma diagnosis at the age of 20 years-old in January 2024, but was able to restart training in the weeks after her last round of chemotherapy returned to road racing four months later.

Competing at the 2025 UEC U23 European Track Championships, she placed fourth in the elimination race, and won a silver medal in the Madison with compatriot Lisa van Belle. In November 2025, she became Dutch Derny Champion in Alkmaar. A month later, she finished second at the National Omnium Championships, behind Lorena Wiebes and ahead of Van Belle. A few days later, together with Nienke Veenhoven, she won silver in the Madison behind Van Belle and Weibes.

In 2026, she rode with British Continental team O'Shea Redchilli Bikes. She competed for the Netherlands at the 2026 UCI Track Cycling World Championships in Shanghai, China.

== Personal life ==
She is the second cousin of cyclist Niki Terpstra.
