= Alberte Greve =

Danish cyclist (born 2005)

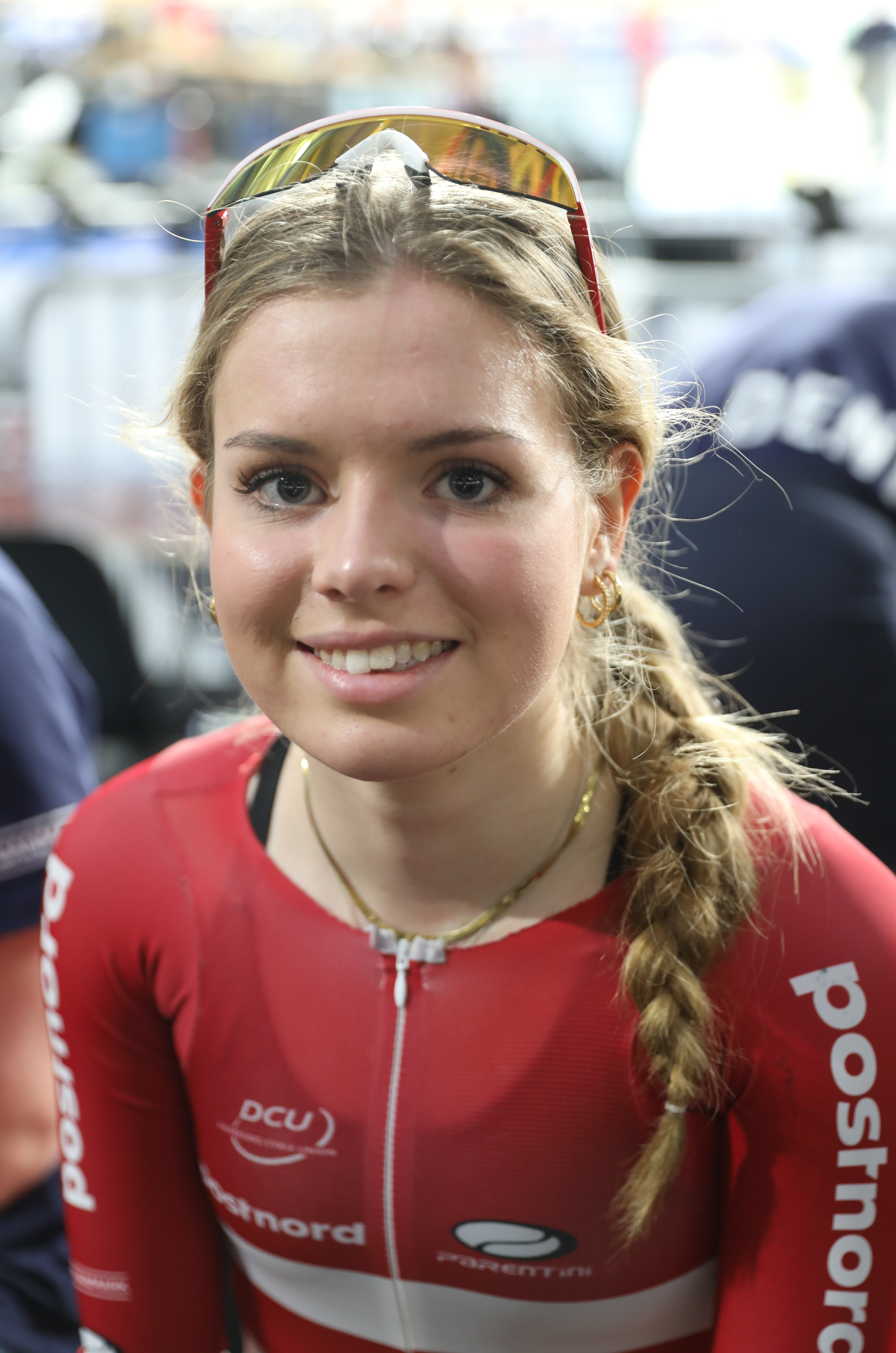
- Greve in 2024

Personal information
- Full name: Alberte Emilie Greve
- Born: 16 September 2005 (age 21) Næstved, Denmark

Cycling career
- Sport: Cycling
- Current team: Uno-X Mobility
- Discipline: Road
- Role: Rider

Amateur teams
- 2022: Amager Cykle Ring
- 2022–2023: Team Rytger

Professional teams
- 2024: Lotto–Dstny Ladies
- 2025–: Uno-X Mobility

Major wins
- One day races National Road Race Championships (2025)

Alberte Greve (born 16 September 2005) is a Danish racing cyclist, who currently rides for UCI Women's WorldTeam Uno-X Mobility.

== Major results ==
2023
1st Time trial, National Junior Road Championships
6th Time trial, European Junior Road Championships
6th Ronde van Vlaanderen WJ
2024
1st Time trial, National Under-23 Road Championships
3rd Time trial, National Road Championships
2025
National Road Championships

1st Road race
4th Time trial
