= Clara Copponi =

French cyclist (born 1999)

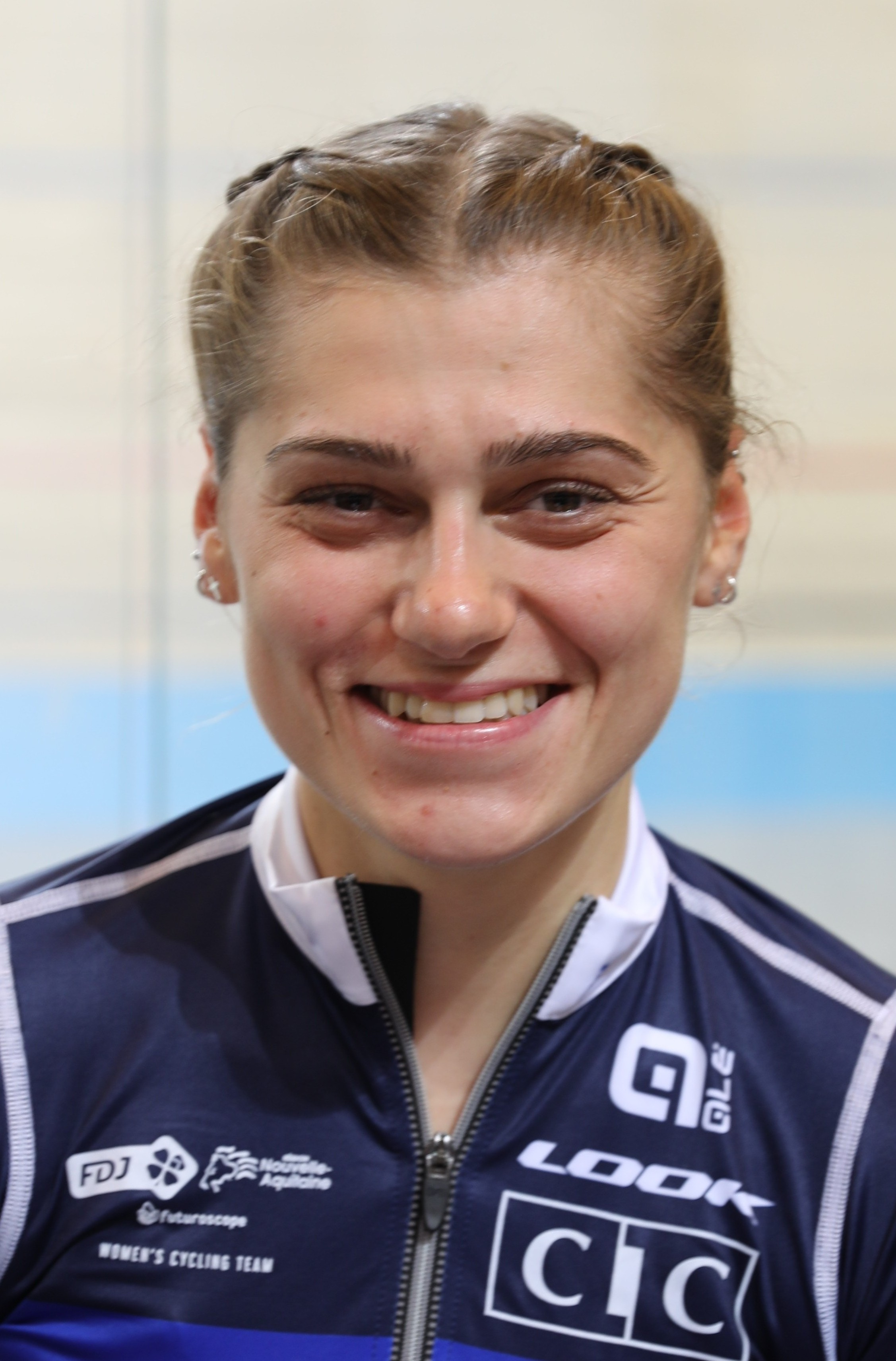
- Copponi in 2019

Personal information
- Born: 12 January 1999 (age 27) Aix-en-Provence, France
- Height: 1.65 m (5 ft 5 in)
- Weight: 55 kg (121 lb)

Cycling career
- Sport: Cycling
- Current team: Lidl–Trek
- Disciplines: Road; Track
- Role: Rider

Amateur teams
- 2017: VC Saint-Antoine la Gavotte
- 2018–2019: Bio Frais
- 2018: FDJ Nouvelle-Aquitaine Futuroscope (stagiaire)

Professional teams
- 2019–2023: FDJ Nouvelle-Aquitaine Futuroscope
- 2024–: Lidl–Trek
Medal record
Women's track cycling
Representing France
World Championships
| Silver medal – second place | 2020 Berlin | Madison |
| Silver medal – second place | 2021 Roubaix | Madison |
| Silver medal – second place | 2022 Saint-Quentin-en-Yvelines | Madison |
| Silver medal – second place | 2026 Shanghai | Madison |
| Bronze medal – third place | 2022 Saint-Quentin-en-Yvelines | Team pursuit |
| Bronze medal – third place | 2023 Glasgow | Madison |
| Bronze medal – third place | 2023 Glasgow | Team pursuit |
European Championships
| Gold medal – first place | 2024 Apeldoorn | Scratch |
| Silver medal – second place | 2022 Munich | Omnium |
| Silver medal – second place | 2022 Munich | Madison |
| Silver medal – second place | 2023 Grenchen | Madison |
| Bronze medal – third place | 2022 Munich | Team pursuit |

Clara Copponi (born 12 January 1999) is a French professional road and track cyclist, who currently rides for UCI Women's WorldTeam Lidl–Trek. She was the 2024 European scratch race champion. She rode in the women's team pursuit event at the 2019 UEC European Track Championships in Apeldoorn, Netherlands.

== Major results ==
=== Road ===
2021
3rd Overall The Women's Tour
2022
1st La Choralis Fourmies Féminine
1st Stage 1 The Women's Tour
2nd Grand Prix International d'Isbergues
4th Ronde van Drenthe
5th Omloop Het Nieuwsblad
5th Le Samyn
6th Omloop van het Hageland
10th Classic Brugge–De Panne
10th Gent–Wevelgem
2023
5th La Choralis Fourmies Féminine
8th Gent–Wevelgem
9th Grand Prix International d'Isbergues
2024
4th Road race, European Road Championships
5th Overall RideLondon Classique
10th Road race, National Road Championships
2025
1st Schwalbe Women's One Day Classic
1st GP Mazda Schelkens
2nd Antwerp Port Epic
4th Surf Coast Classic
8th Omloop Het Nieuwsblad
2026
1st Ronde de Mouscron
