= Valentine Fortin =

French cyclist (born 1999)

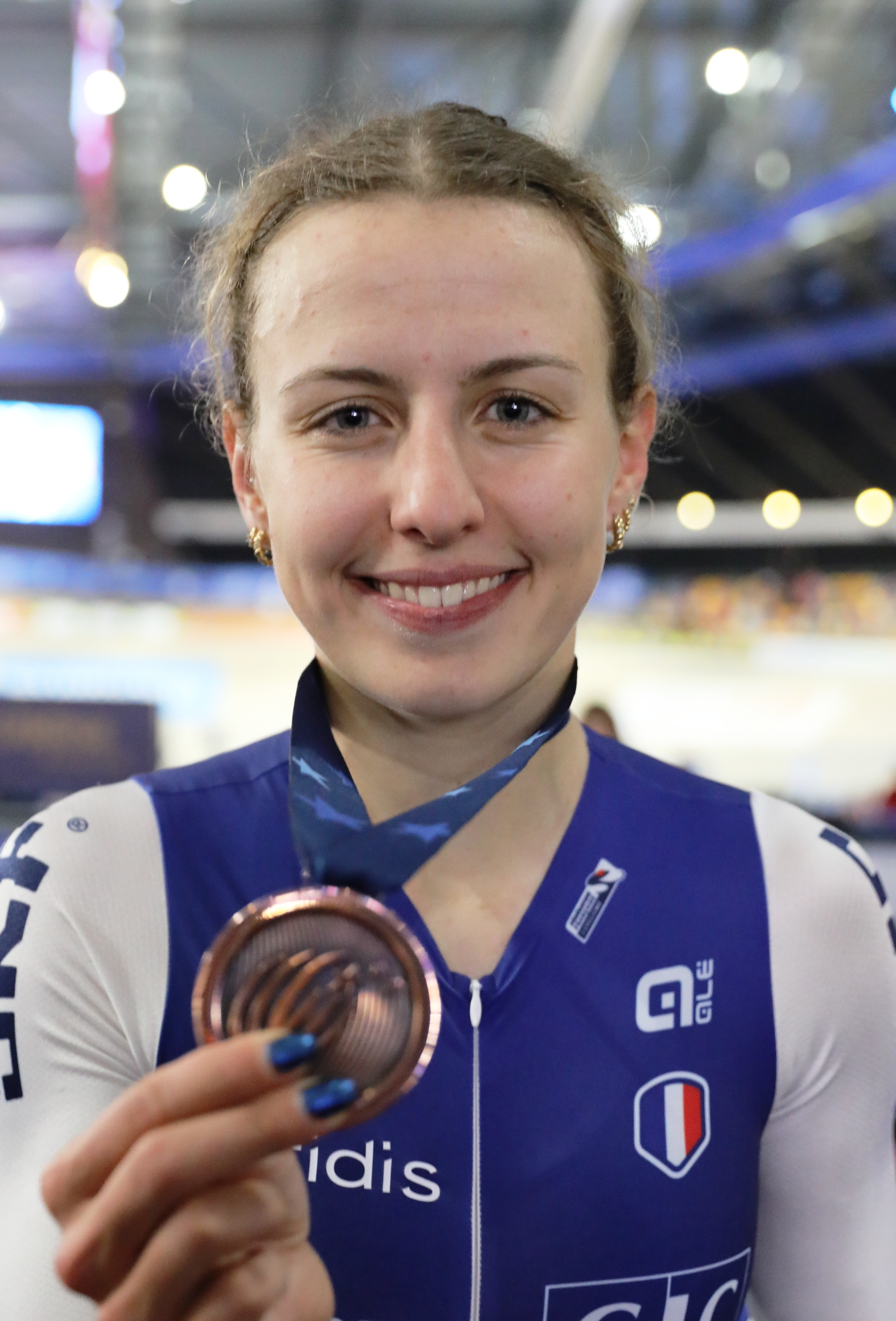
- Fortin in 2024

Personal information
- Born: 24 April 1999 (age 27) Toulouse, France

Cycling career
- Sport: Cycling
- Discipline: Track
- Role: Rider
Medal record
Women's track cycling
Representing France
World Championships
Silver medal – second place	2022 Saint-Quentin-en-Yvelines	Madison
Silver medal – second place	2023 Glasgow	Elimination
Bronze medal – third place	2022 Saint-Quentin-en-Yvelines	Team pursuit
Bronze medal – third place	2023 Glasgow	Team pursuit
European Championships
Gold medal – first place	2021 Grenchen	Elimination
Gold medal – first place	2024 Apeldoorn	Madison
Silver medal – second place	2021 Grenchen	Scratch
Silver medal – second place	2023 Grenchen	Elimination
Bronze medal – third place	2022 Munich	Team pursuit
Bronze medal – third place	2024 Apeldoorn	Omnium

Valentine Fortin (born 24 April 1999) is a French racing cyclist. She rode in the women's scratch event at the 2018 UCI Track Cycling World Championships.

== Major results ==
2021
2nd La Classique Morbihan
8th Grand Prix International d'Isbergues
2022
4th La Choralis Fourmies Féminine
10th GP Oetingen
2023
Bretagne Ladies Tour

1st Points classification
1st Stage 2 & 5

3rd Ronde de Mouscron
2025
7th Antwerp Port Epic
8th Classic Brugge–De Panne Women
