= Marit Raaijmakers =

Dutch cyclist (born 1999)

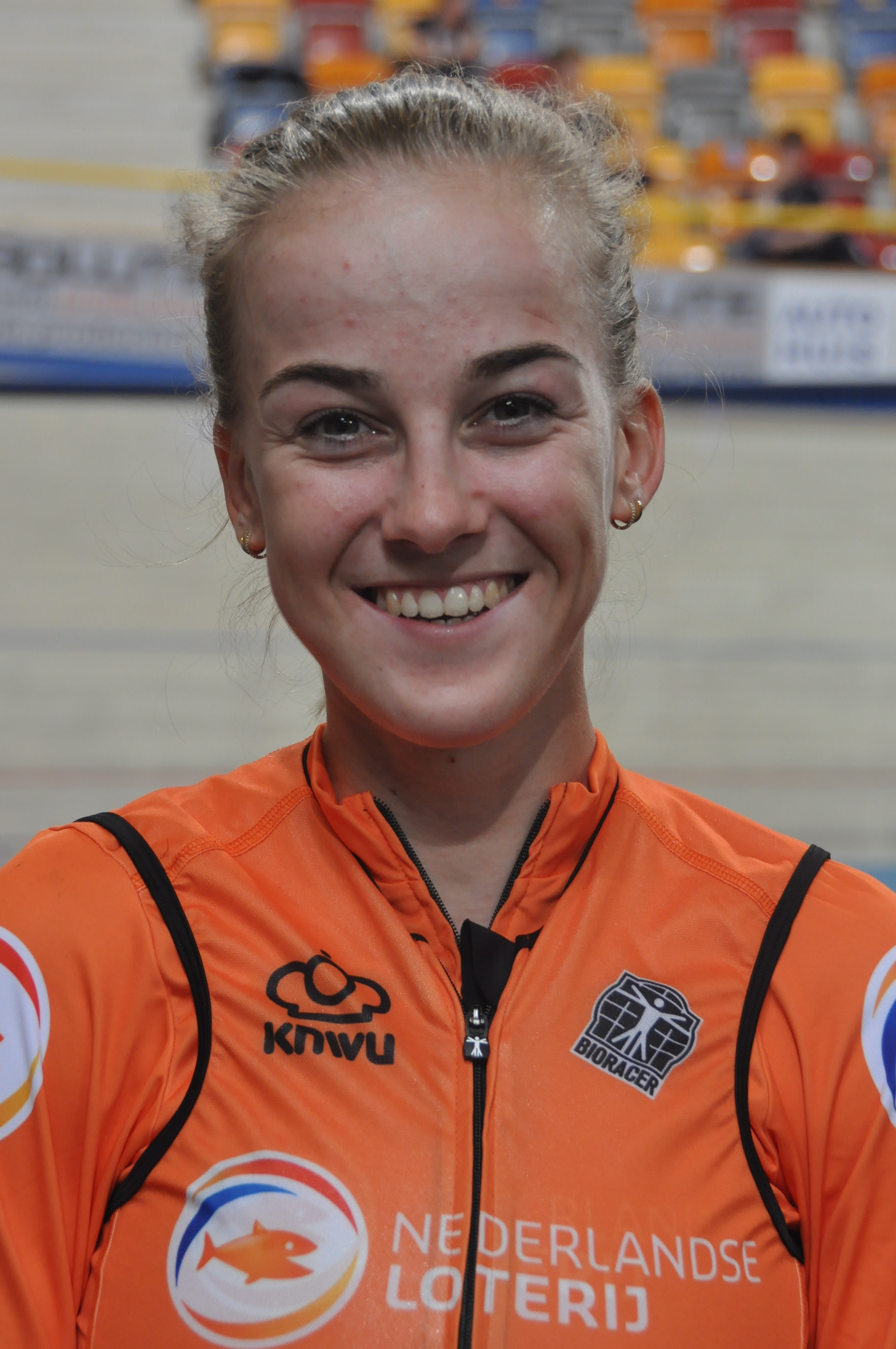
- Raaijmakers in 2021

Personal information
- Full name: Marit Raaijmakers
- Born: 2 June 1999 (age 27) Hippolytushoef, Netherlands

Cycling career
- Sport: Cycling
- Current team: Human Powered Health
- Disciplines: Road; Track
- Role: Rider

Professional teams
- 2018–2021: Parkhotel Valkenburg
- 2022–: Human Powered Health

Marit Raaijmakers (born 2 June 1999) is a Dutch racing cyclist, who currently rides for UCI Women's WorldTeam Human Powered Health. She rode for Parkhotel Valkenburg in the women's team time trial event at the 2018 UCI Road World Championships.

== Major results ==
=== Road ===
2017
2nd Time trial, National Junior Road Championships
6th Time trial, UCI Junior Road World Championships
2021
1st Overall Watersley Women's Challenge

1st Mountains classification
1st Stage 1

9th Overall Tour de la Semois

1st Young rider classification

2023
8th La Classique Morbihan
2024
2nd Vuelta a la Comunitat Valenciana Feminas
9th Clásica de Almería

=== Track ===
2015
3rd Team pursuit, National Championships
2017
National Championships

1st Derny
3rd Points race
3rd Madison

2018
3rd Madison, National Championships
2019
National Championships

1st Derny
2nd Madison

2nd Derny, UEC European Championships
2021
National Championships

1st Elimination
2nd Scratch
3rd Madison
3rd Points race

UEC European Under-23 Track Championships

2nd Madison (with Maike van der Duin)
3rd Team pursuit

2022
National Championships

1st Points race
1st Madison (with Lorena Wiebes)
1st Individual pursuit

2023
National Championships

1st Points race
1st Madison (with Lorena Wiebes)
2nd Elimination

UCI Nations Cup

3rd Elimination, Jakarta

2024
UCI Nations Cup

3rd Madison, Hong Kong
