= Lea Lin Teutenberg =

German cyclist (born 1999)

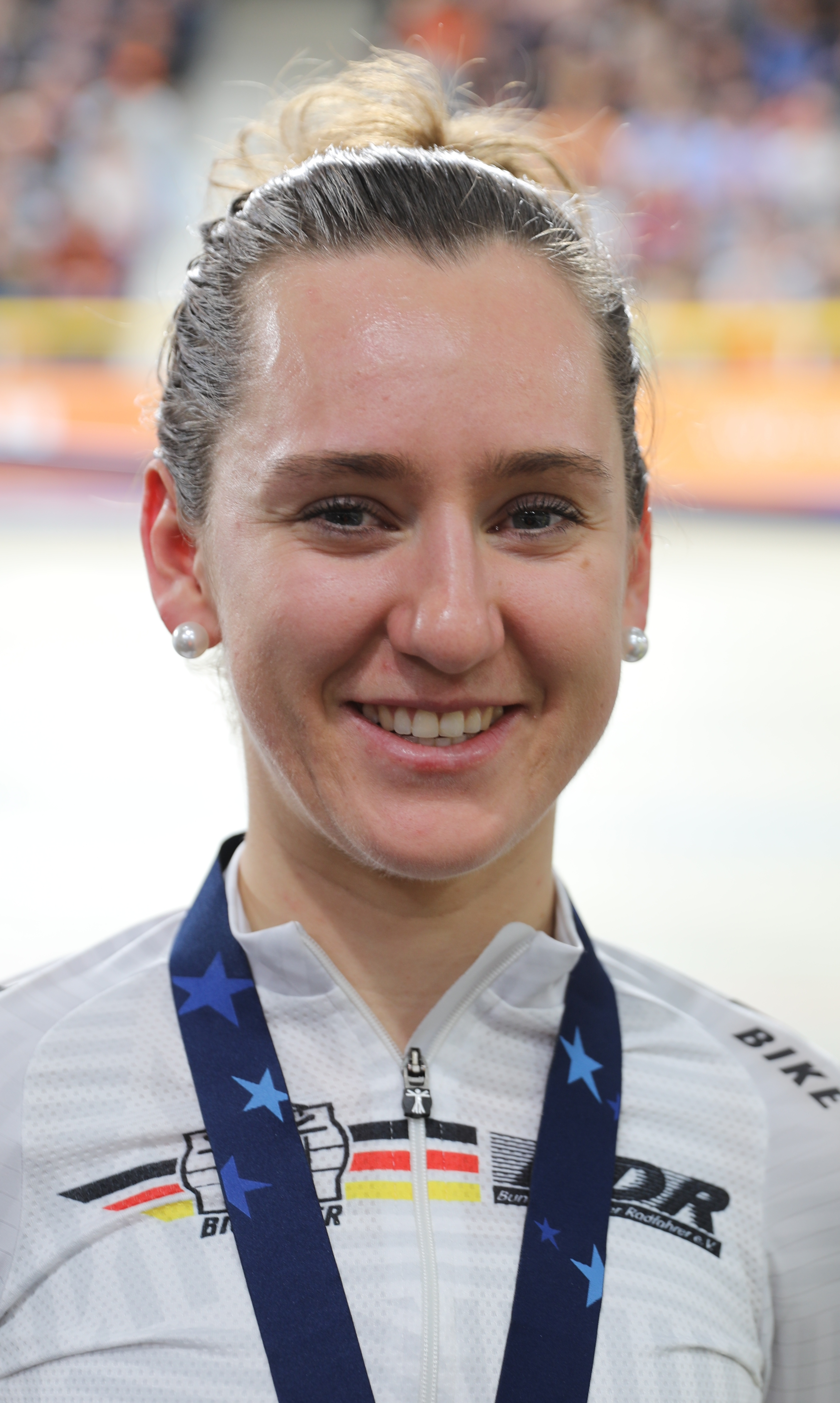
- Teutenberg in 2024

Personal information
- Full name: Lea Lin Teutenberg
- Born: 2 July 1999 (age 27)

Cycling career
- Sport: Cycling
- Current team: Lotto–Intermarché Ladies
- Disciplines: Road; Track
- Role: Rider

Amateur team
- 2011–2017: FC Lexxi Speedbike

Professional teams
- 2018–2024: WNT–Rotor Pro Cycling
- 2025–: Lotto Ladies
Medal record
Women's track cycling
Representing Germany
European Championships
Silver medal – second place	2024 Apeldoorn	Elimination
Bronze medal – third place	2026 Konya	Elimination

Lea Lin Teutenberg (born 2 July 1999) is a German professional racing cyclist, who currently rides for UCI Women's Continental Team Lotto–Intermarché Ladies. She is part of a cycling dynasty with her father, Lars Teutenberg, brother, Tim Torn Teutenberg, uncle Sven Teutenberg and aunt Ina-Yoko Teutenberg.
