= 2025 UCI Track Cycling World Championships – Women's individual pursuit =

Women's individual pursuit at the 2025 UCI Track Cycling World Championships
- Venue: Velódromo Peñalolén
- Location: Santiago, Chile
- Dates: 25 October
- Competitors: 27 from 16 nations
- Winning time: 4:27.005

Medalists
gold medal	Anna Morris	Great Britain
silver medal	Josie Knight	Great Britain
bronze medal	Chloé Dygert	United States

The Women's individual pursuit competition at the 2025 UCI Track Cycling World Championships was held on 25 October 2025.

== Results ==
=== Qualifying ===
The qualifying was started at 13:18. The two fasters riders raced for gold, the third and fourth fastest riders raced for bronze.

Rank	Name	Nation	Time	Behind	Notes
1	Anna Morris	Great Britain	4:24.194		QG
2	Josie Knight	Great Britain	4:25.141	+0.947	QG
3	Chloé Dygert	United States	4:26.127	+1.933	QB
4	Federica Venturelli	Italy	4:31.876	+7.682	QB
5	Prudence Fowler	New Zealand	4:32.902	+8.708	
6	Franziska Brauße	Germany	4:32.924	+8.730	
7	Martina Alzini	Italy	4:33.539	+9.345	
8	Jessica Roberts	Great Britain	4:36.883	+12.689	
9	Mieke Kröger	Germany	4:37.209	+13.015	
10	Jasmin Liechti	Switzerland	4:37.616	+13.422	
11	Sophie Edwards	Australia	4:39.280	+15.086	
12	Fiona Mangan	Ireland	4:40.390	+16.196	
13	Luca Vierstraete	Belgium	4:43.210	+19.016	
14	Maeve Plouffe	Australia	4:44.999	+20.805	
15	Annika Liehner	Switzerland	4:46.809	+22.615	
16	Isabella Escalera	Spain	4:47.512	+23.318	
17	Martyna Szczęsna	Poland	4:47.872	+23.678	
18	Lina Hernández	Colombia	4:47.933	+23.739	
19	Teniel Campbell	Trinidad and Tobago	4:49.645	+25.451	
20	Mizuki Ikeda	Japan	4:49.709	+25.515	
21	Fiona Majendie	Canada	4:50.519	+26.325	
22	Aranza Villalón	Spain	4:52.112	+27.918	
23	Alexandra Volstad	Canada	4:57.031	+32.837	
24	Patrycja Lorkowska	Poland	5:01.305	+37.111	
25	Paola Silva	Uruguay	5:10.063	+45.869	

=== Finals ===
The final was started at 19:54.

Rank	Name	Nation	Time	Behind
Gold medal race
1st place, gold medalist(s)	Anna Morris	Great Britain	4:27.005	
2nd place, silver medalist(s)	Josie Knight	Great Britain	4:29.322	+2.317
Bronze medal race
3rd place, bronze medalist(s)	Chloé Dygert	United States		
4	Federica Venturelli	Italy	OVL	
