= 2025 UEC European Track Championships – Women's omnium =

Women's omnium at the 2025 UEC European Track Championships
- Venue: Velodroom Limburg, Heusden-Zolder
- Date: 14 February
- Competitors: 20
- Winning points: 114

Medalists
gold medal	Lorena Wiebes	Netherlands
silver medal	Maddie Leech	Great Britain
bronze medal	Amalie Dideriksen	Denmark

The women's omnium competition at the 2025 UEC European Track Championships was held on 14 February 2025.

== Results ==
=== Scratch race ===
Rank	Name	Nation	Laps down	Event points
1	Lorena Wiebes	Netherlands		40
2	Olga Wankiewicz	Poland		38
3	Maddie Leech	Great Britain		36
4	Anita Stenberg	Norway		34
5	Valeria Valgonen	Individual Neutral Athletes		32
6	Lara Gillespie	Ireland		30
7	Alžbeta Bačíková	Slovakia		28
8	Chiara Consonni	Italy		26
9	Amalie Dideriksen	Denmark		24
10	Lea Lin Teutenberg	Germany		22
11	Daniela Campos	Portugal		20
12	Katrijn de Clercq	Belgium		18
13	Victoire Berteau	France		16
14	Milana Ushakova	Ukraine		14
15	Akvilė Gedraitytė	Lithuania		12
16	Eva Anguela	Spain		10
17	Jasmin Liechti	Switzerland		8
18	Leila Gschwentner	Austria		6
19	Karalina Biruk	Individual Neutral Athletes		4
20	Petra Ševčíková	Czech Republic		2

=== Tempo race ===
Rank	Name	Nation	Points in race	Event points
1	Anita Stenberg	Norway	43	40
2	Daniela Campos	Portugal	29	38
3	Victoire Berteau	France	28	36
4	Amalie Dideriksen	Denmark	24	34
5	Maddie Leech	Great Britain	24	32
6	Lea Lin Teutenberg	Germany	22	30
7	Chiara Consonni	Italy	21	28
8	Lara Gillespie	Ireland	21	26
9	Jasmin Liechti	Switzerland	21	24
10	Eva Anguela	Spain	21	22
11	Katrijn de Clercq	Belgium	21	20
12	Valeria Valgonen	Individual Neutral Athletes	21	18
13	Lorena Wiebes	Netherlands	20	16
14	Karalina Biruk	Individual Neutral Athletes	0	14
15	Leila Gschwentner	Austria	0	12
16	Petra Ševčíková	Czech Republic	0	10
17	Akvilė Gedraitytė	Lithuania	0	8
18	Milana Ushakova	Ukraine	0	6
19	Alžbeta Bačíková	Slovakia	0	4
20	Olga Wankiewicz	Poland	0	2

=== Elimination race ===
Rank	Name	Nation	Event points
1	Lorena Wiebes	Netherlands	40
2	Maddie Leech	Great Britain	38
3	Chiara Consonni	Italy	36
4	Victoire Berteau	France	34
5	Amalie Dideriksen	Denmark	32
6	Lara Gillespie	Ireland	30
8	Petra Ševčíková	Czech Republic	28
7	Jasmin Liechti	Switzerland	26
9	Katrijn de Clercq	Belgium	24
10	Olga Wankiewicz	Poland	22
11	Lea Lin Teutenberg	Germany	20
12	Valeria Valgonen	Individual Neutral Athletes	18
13	Eva Anguela	Spain	16
14	Anita Stenberg	Norway	14
15	Alžbeta Bačíková	Slovakia	12
16	Leila Gschwentner	Austria	10
17	Milana Ushakova	Ukraine	8
18	Akvilė Gedraitytė	Lithuania	6
19	Karalina Biruk	Individual Neutral Athletes	4
20	Daniela Campos	Portugal	2

=== Points race ===
Overall rank	Name	Nation	Scratch race	Tempo race	Elim. race	Subtotal	Lap points	Sprint points	Finish order	Total points
1st place, gold medalist(s)	Lorena Wiebes	Netherlands	40	16	40	96	0	18	1	114
2nd place, silver medalist(s)	Maddie Leech	Great Britain	36	32	38	106	0	8	20	114
3rd place, bronze medalist(s)	Amalie Dideriksen	Denmark	24	34	32	90	0	13	17	103
4	Anita Stenberg	Norway	34	40	14	88	0	10	2	98
5	Lara Gillespie	Ireland	30	26	30	86	0	10	19	96
6	Chiara Consonni	Italy	26	28	36	90	0	4	4	94
7	Victoire Berteau	France	16	36	34	86	0	4	14	90
8	Lea Lin Teutenberg	Germany	22	30	20	72	0	1	10	73
9	Jasmin Liechti	Switzerland	8	24	28	60	0	10	13	70
10	Valeria Valgonen	Individual Neutral Athletes	32	18	18	68	0	0	12	68
11	Olga Wankiewicz	Poland	38	2	22	62	0	5	5	67
12	Daniela Campos	Portugal	20	38	2	60	0	6	7	66
13	Katrijn de Clercq	Belgium	18	20	24	62	0	4	9	66
14	Eva Anguela	Spain	10	22	16	48	0	0	15	48
15	Leila Gschwentner	Austria	6	12	10	28	0	2	11	30
16	Alžbeta Bačíková	Slovakia	28	4	12	44	–20	0	18	24
17	Petra Ševčíková	Czech Republic	2	10	26	38	–20	4	3	22
18	Milana Ushakova	Ukraine	14	6	8	38	–20	0	6	8
19	Akvilė Gedraitytė	Lithuania	12	8	6	26	–20	0	8	6
20	Karalina Biruk	Individual Neutral Athletes	4	14	4	22	–40	0	16	–18
