= 2025 UCI Track Cycling World Championships – Women's team pursuit =

Women's team pursuit at the 2025 UCI Track Cycling World Championships
- Venue: Peñalolén Velodrome
- Location: Santiago, Chile
- Dates: 22–23 October
- Competitors: 58 from 13 nations
- Teams: 13
- Winning time: 4:09.569

Medalists
gold medal	Vittoria Guazzini; Martina Fidanza; Martina Alzini; Federica Venturelli; Chiara Consonni	Italy
silver medal	Messane Bräutigam; Franziska Brauße; Lisa Klein; Laura Süßemilch; Mieke Kröger	Germany
bronze medal	Maddie Leech; Megan Barker; Josie Knight; Anna Morris; Jessica Roberts	Great Britain

The Women's team pursuit competition at the 2025 UCI Track Cycling World Championships was held on 22 and 23 October 2025.

== Results ==
=== Qualifying ===
The qualifying was started on 22 October at 11:00. The eight fastest teams advanced to the first round.

Rank	Nation	Time	Behind	Notes
1	Italy; Vittoria Guazzini; Martina Fidanza; Martina Alzini; Federica Venturelli	4:09.609		Q
2	Great Britain; Jessica Roberts; Megan Barker; Josie Knight; Anna Morris	4:09.865	+0.256	Q
3	Germany; Messane Bräutigam; Franziska Brauße; Lisa Klein; Mieke Kröger	4:11.462	+1.853	Q
4	Australia; Alexandra Manly; Maeve Plouffe; Alyssa Polites; Sophie Edwards	4:16.976	+7.367	Q
5	Belgium; Shari Bossuyt; Katrijn De Clercq; Hélène Hesters; Luca Vierstraete	4:17.381	+7.772	Q
6	Japan; Yumi Kajihara; Tsuyaka Uchino; Mizuki Ikeda; Maho Kakita	4:17.897	+8.288	Q
7	Switzerland; Aline Seitz; Jasmin Liechti; Fabienne Buri; Annika Liehner	4:18.246	+8.637	Q
8	Poland; Maja Tracka; Olga Wankiewicz; Tamara Szalińska; Martyna Szczęsna	4:22.024	+12.415	Q
9	Canada; Lily Plante; Fiona Majendie; Ariane Bonhomme; Alexandra Volstad	4:25.054	+15.445	
10	Chile; Scarlet Cortés; Marlen Rojas; Aranza Villalón; Paula Villalón	4:27.524	+17.915	
11	Spain; Isabella Escalera; Laura Rodríguez; Isabel Ferreres; Margarita López	4:27.565	+17.956	
12	Colombia; Elizabeth Castaño; Stefany Cuadrado; Lina Hernández; Juliana Londoño	4:30.685	+21.076	
13	Ireland; Aoife O'Brien; Erin Creighton; Fiona Mangan; Caoimhe O'Brien	4:31.541	+21.932	

=== First round ===
The first round was stated on 23 October at 17:30.

First round heats were held as follows:
Heat 1: 6th v 7th fastest
Heat 2: 5th v 8th fastest
Heat 3: 2nd v 3rd fastest
Heat 4: 1st v 4th fastest

The winners of heats three and four advanced to the gold medal race. The remaining six teams were ranked on time, from which the top two proceeded to the bronze medal race.

Rank	Heat	Nation	Time	Notes
1	1	Japan; Yumi Kajihara; Tsuyaka Uchino; Mizuki Ikeda; Maho Kakita	4:17.354	
2	1	Switzerland; Aline Seitz; Jasmin Liechti; Fabienne Buri; Annika Liehner	4:18.266	
1	2	Belgium; Shari Bossuyt; Katrijn De Clercq; Hélène Hesters; Luca Vierstraete	4:15.489	QB
2	2	Poland; Olga Wankiewicz; Nikol Płosaj; Tamara Szalińska; Martyna Szczęsna	4:24.092	
1	3	Germany; Messane Bräutigam; Franziska Brauße; Lisa Klein; Laura Süßemilch	4:09.059	QG
2	3	Great Britain; Jessica Roberts; Megan Barker; Josie Knight; Anna Morris	4:10.736	QB
1	4	Italy; Chiara Consonni; Vittoria Guazzini; Martina Fidanza; Federica Venturelli	4:11.101	QG
2	4	Australia; Maeve Plouffe; Claudia Marcks; Alyssa Polites; Sophie Edwards	4:18.823	

=== Finals ===
The finals were stated on 23 October at 20:13.

Rank	Nation	Time	Behind	Notes
Gold medal race
1st place, gold medalist(s)	Italy; Vittoria Guazzini; Martina Fidanza; Martina Alzini; Federica Venturelli	4:09.569		
2nd place, silver medalist(s)	Germany; Messane Bräutigam; Franziska Brauße; Lisa Klein; Laura Süßemilch	4:09.951	+0.382	
Bronze medal race
3rd place, bronze medalist(s)	Great Britain; Maddie Leech; Megan Barker; Josie Knight; Anna Morris	4:12.380		
4	Belgium; Katrijn De Clercq; Hélène Hesters; Marith Vanhove; Luca Vierstraete	4:18.675	+6.295	
