= 2025 UCI Track Cycling World Championships – Women's points race =

Women's points race at the 2025 UCI Track Cycling World Championships
- Venue: Velódromo Peñalolén
- Location: Santiago, Chile
- Dates: 26 October
- Competitors: 22 from 22 nations
- Winning points: 63

Medalists
| gold medal | Yareli Acevedo | Mexico |
| silver medal | Anna Morris | Great Britain |
| bronze medal | Bryony Botha | New Zealand |

The Women's points race competition at the 2025 UCI Track Cycling World Championships was held on 26 October 2025.

== Results ==
The race was started at 13:54.

| Rank | Name | Nation | Lap points | Sprint points | Total points |
|---|---|---|---|---|---|
| 1st place, gold medalist(s) | Yareli Acevedo | Mexico | 60 | 3 | 63 |
| 2nd place, silver medalist(s) | Anna Morris | Great Britain | 40 | 18 | 58 |
| 3rd place, bronze medalist(s) | Bryony Botha | New Zealand | 40 | 16 | 56 |
| 4 | Alexandra Manly | Australia | 40 | 14 | 54 |
| 5 | Amalie Dideriksen | Denmark | 40 | 12 | 52 |
| 6 | Lea Lin Teutenberg | Germany | 40 | 11 | 51 |
| 7 | Federica Venturelli | Italy | 40 | 10 | 50 |
| 8 | Tsuyaka Uchino | Japan | 40 | 10 | 50 |
| 9 | Barbora Němcová | Czech Republic | 40 | 4 | 44 |
| 10 | Anita Stenberg | Norway | 40 | 3 | 43 |
| 11 | Victoire Berteau | France | 40 | 0 | 40 |
| 12 | Lara Gillespie | Ireland | 20 | 5 | 25 |
| 13 | Olivija Baleišytė | Lithuania | 20 | 0 | 20 |
| 14 | Isabella Escalera | Spain | 0 | 3 | 3 |
| 15 | Katrijn De Clercq | Belgium | 0 | 3 | 3 |
| 16 | Patrycja Lorkowska | Poland | 0 | 2 | 2 |
| 17 | Bethany Ingram | United States | 0 | 2 | 2 |
| 18 | Lisa van Belle | Netherlands | 0 | 0 | 0 |
| 19 | Alžbeta Bačíková | Slovakia | −20 | 0 | −20 |
| 20 | Marlen Rojas | Chile | −40 | 0 | −40 |
| — | Ngaire Barraclough | Canada | Did not finish | | |
| — | Teniel Campbell | Trinidad and Tobago | Did not finish | | |
