= 2026 UCI Track Cycling World Championships – Women's omnium =

Women's omnium at the 2026 UCI Track Cycling World Championships
- Venue: Shanghai Velodrome
- Location: Shanghai, China
- Dates: 16 October

Medalists
gold medal	Anna Morris	Great Britain
silver medal	Tsuyaka Uchino	Japan
bronze medal	Amalie Dideriksen	Denmark

The Women's omnium competition at the 2026 UCI Track Cycling World Championships will be held on 16 October 2026.

== Results ==
=== Scratch race ===
The scratch race was started at 12:38.

Rank	Name	Nation	Laps down	Event points
1	Tsuyaka Uchino	Japan		40
2	Amalie Dideriksen	Denmark		38
3	Anna Morris	Great Britain		36
4	Lara Gillespie	Ireland		34
5	Elisa Balsamo	Italy		32
6	Petra Ševčíková	Czech Republic		30
7	Chen Ning	China		28
8	Eva Anguela	Spain		26
9	Michelle Andres	Switzerland		24
10	Victoire Berteau	France		22
11	Ebtissam Mohamed	Egypt		20
12	Olivija Baleišytė	Lithuania		18
13	Lea Lin Teutenberg	Germany		16
14	Nafosat Kozieva	Uzbekistan		14
15	Anita Stenberg	Norway		12
16	Lotte Kopecky	Belgium		10
17	Samantha Donnelly	New Zealand		8
18	Lee Sze Wing	Hong Kong		6
19	Megan Jastrab	United States		4
20	Maria Martins	Portugal		2
21	Maeve Plouffe	Australia		1
22	Yareli Acevedo	Mexico		1
23	Teniel Campbell	Trinidad and Tobago		1
—	Lorena Wiebes	Netherlands	DNF	1

=== Tempo race ===
The tempo race was started at 14:47.

Rank	Name	Nation	Lap points	Sprint points	Total points	Finish Order	Event points
1	Anna Morris	Great Britain	40	0	40	19	40
2	Lotte Kopecky	Belgium	20	10	30	21	38
3	Victoire Berteau	France	20	4	24	20	36
4	Maria Martins	Portugal	20	2	22	16	38
5	Anita Stenberg	Norway	20	0	20	14	38
6	Tsuyaka Uchino	Japan	0	4	4	1	36
7	Amalie Dideriksen	Denmark	0	4	4	22	34
8	Yareli Acevedo	Mexico	0	3	3	18	26
9	Megan Jastrab	United States	0	2	2	11	24
10	Lara Gillespie	Ireland	0	1	1	2	22
11	Elisa Balsamo	Italy	0	1	1	3	20
12	Chen Ning	China	0	1	1	4	18
13	Lee Sze Wing	Hong Kong	0	1	1	7	16
14	Eva Anguela	Spain	0	1	1	17	14
15	Maeve Plouffe	Australia	0	0	0	5	12
16	Michelle Andres	Switzerland	0	0	0	6	10
17	Samantha Donnelly	New Zealand	0	0	0	8	8
18	Lea Lin Teutenberg	Germany	0	0	0	9	6
19	Petra Ševčíková	Czech Republic	0	0	0	10	4
20	Olivija Baleišytė	Lithuania	0	0	0	12	2
21	Teniel Campbell	Trinidad and Tobago	0	0	0	13	1
22	Nafosat Kozieva	Uzbekistan	0	0	0	15	1
—	Ebtissam Mohamed	Egypt	−40	0	0	DNF	−39
—	Lorena Wiebes	Netherlands	DNS				

=== Elimination race ===
The elimination race was started at 18:07.

Rank	Name	Nation	Event points
1	Victoire Berteau	France	40
2	Lotte Kopecky	Belgium	38
3	Anna Morris	Great Britain	36
4	Elisa Balsamo	Italy	34
5	Amalie Dideriksen	Denmark	32
6	Tsuyaka Uchino	Japan	30
7	Eva Anguela	Spain	28
8	Lara Gillespie	Ireland	26
9	Petra Ševčíková	Czech Republic	24
10	Michelle Andres	Switzerland	22
11	Samantha Donnelly	New Zealand	20
12	Anita Stenberg	Norway	18
13	Yareli Acevedo	Mexico	16
14	Maria Martins	Portugal	14
15	Maeve Plouffe	Australia	12
16	Olivija Baleišytė	Lithuania	10
17	Nafosat Kozieva	Uzbekistan	8
18	Chen Ning	China	6
19	Ebtissam Mohamed	Egypt	4
20	Megan Jastrab	United States	2
21	Teniel Campbell	Trinidad and Tobago	1
22	Lee Sze Wing	Hong Kong	1
23	Lea Lin Teutenberg	Germany	1
—	Lorena Wiebes	Netherlands	DNS

=== Points race and overall standings ===
The points race started at 19:40.

Rank	Name	Nation	Lap points	Sprint points	Total points	Finish Order
1st place, gold medalist(s)	Anna Morris	Great Britain	0	13	125	7
2nd place, silver medalist(s)	Tsuyaka Uchino	Japan	0	14	114	22
3rd place, bronze medalist(s)	Amalie Dideriksen	Denmark	0	9	107	19
4	Victoire Berteau	France	0	4	102	5
5	Lara Gillespie	Ireland	0	7	89	4
6	Elisa Balsamo	Italy	0	0	86	10
7	Lotte Kopecky	Belgium	0	0	86	21
8	Anita Stenberg	Norway	0	6	68	12
9	Petra Ševčíková	Czech Republic	0	5	63	3
10	Maria Martins	Portugal	0	11	61	2
11	Michelle Andres	Switzerland	0	3	59	11
12	Yareli Acevedo	Mexico	0	15	58	1
13	Chen Ning	China	0	0	52	6
14	Eva Anguela	Spain	−20	0	48	18
15	Lee Sze Wing	Hong Kong	0	7	30	13
16	Lea Lin Teutenberg	Germany	0	3	26	14
17	Nafosat Kozieva	Uzbekistan	0	2	25	20
18	Samantha Donnelly	New Zealand	−20	0	16	15
19	Megan Jastrab	United States	−20	0	10	8
20	Olivija Baleišytė	Lithuania	−20	0	10	16
21	Maeve Plouffe	Australia	−20	0	5	9
22	Teniel Campbell	Trinidad and Tobago	−40	0	−37	17
23	Ebtissam Mohamed	Egypt	−40	0	−55	DNF
—	Lorena Wiebes	Netherlands	DNS			
