= 2024 UCI Track Cycling World Championships – Women's team pursuit =

Women's team pursuit at the 2024 UCI Track Cycling World Championships
- Venue: Ballerup Super Arena
- Location: Ballerup, Denmark
- Dates: 16–17 October
- Competitors: 44 from 10 nations
- Teams: 10

Medalists
gold medal	Jessica Roberts; Katie Archibald; Josie Knight; Anna Morris; Megan Barker	Great Britain
silver medal	Franziska Brauße; Lisa Klein; Mieke Kröger; Laura Süßemilch	Germany
bronze medal	Letizia Paternoster; Chiara Consonni; Martina Alzini; Vittoria Guazzini; Martina Fidanza	Italy

The Women's team pursuit competition at the 2024 UCI Track Cycling World Championships was held on 16 and 17 October 2024.

== Results ==
=== Qualifying ===
The qualifying was started on 16 October at 11:30. The eight fastest teams advanced to the first round.

Rank	Nation	Time	Behind	Notes
1	Great Britain; Katie Archibald; Megan Barker; Josie Knight; Anna Morris	4:11.868		Q
2	Italy; Martina Fidanza; Letizia Paternoster; Chiara Consonni; Vittoria Guazzini	4:14.788	+2.920	Q
3	Germany; Franziska Brauße; Lisa Klein; Mieke Kröger; Laura Süßemilch	4:16.823	+4.955	Q
4	China; Zhou Menghan; Sun Feiyan; Wang Hong; Zhang Mingzhu	4:24.807	+12.939	Q
5	Switzerland; Fabienne Buri; Jasmin Liechti; Annika Liehner; Cybèle Schneider	4:25.178	+13.300	Q
6	Canada; Lily Plante; Kiara Lylyk; Ariane Bonhomme; Fiona Majendie	4:25.532	+13.664	Q
7	Belgium; Katrijn De Clercq; Marith Vanhove; Hélène Hesters; Febe Jooris	4:27.205	+15.337	Q
8	Poland; Maja Tracka; Olga Wankiewicz; Nikol Płosaj; Martyna Szczęsna	4:27.887	+16.019	Q
9	Spain; Ainara Albert; Isabel Ferreres; Marina Garau; Ziortza Isasi	4:30.188	+18.250	
10	Mexico; Yareli Acevedo; Jessica Bonilla; María Gaxiola; Lizbeth Salazar	4:36.906	+25.038	

=== First round ===
The first round was stated on 17 October at 18:32.

First round heats were held as follows:
Heat 1: 6th v 7th fastest
Heat 2: 5th v 8th fastest
Heat 3: 2nd v 3rd fastest
Heat 4: 1st v 4th fastest

The winners of heats three and four advanced to the gold medal race. The remaining six teams were ranked on time, from which the top two proceeded to the bronze medal race.

Rank	Heat	Nation	Time	Notes
1	1	Canada; Lily Plante; Kiara Lylyk; Ariane Bonhomme; Fiona Majendie	4:21.095	QB
2	1	Belgium; Katrijn De Clercq; Marith Vanhove; Hélène Hesters; Febe Jooris	4:22.511	
1	2	Poland; Olga Wankiewicz; Patrycja Lorkowska; Nikol Płosaj; Martyna Szczęsna	4:21.930	
2	2	Switzerland; Fabienne Buri; Jasmin Liechti; Annika Liehner; Cybèle Schneider	4:22.472	
1	3	Germany; Franziska Brauße; Lisa Klein; Mieke Kröger; Laura Süßemilch	4:11.602	QG
2	3	Italy; Letizia Paternoster; Chiara Consonni; Martina Alzini; Vittoria Guazzini	4:12.467	QB
1	4	Great Britain; Jessica Roberts; Katie Archibald; Josie Knight; Anna Morris		QG
2	4	China; Zhou Menghan; Sun Feiyan; Wang Hong; Chen Si	4:25.177	

- QG = qualified for gold medal final
- QB = qualified for bronze medal final

=== Finals ===
The finals were stated on 17 October at 21:14.

Rank	Nation	Time	Notes
Gold medal race
1st place, gold medalist(s)	Great Britain; Jessica Roberts; Katie Archibald; Josie Knight; Anna Morris		
2nd place, silver medalist(s)	Germany; Franziska Brauße; Lisa Klein; Mieke Kröger; Laura Süßemilch	OVL	
Bronze medal race
3rd place, bronze medalist(s)	Italy; Letizia Paternoster; Chiara Consonni; Martina Alzini; Vittoria Guazzini		
4	Canada; Lily Plante; Kiara Lylyk; Ariane Bonhomme; Fiona Majendie	OVL	
