= 2024 UCI Track Cycling World Championships – Women's individual pursuit =

Women's individual pursuit at the 2024 UCI Track Cycling World Championships
- Venue: Ballerup Super Arena
- Location: Ballerup, Denmark
- Dates: 19 October
- Competitors: 19 from 14 nations
- Winning time: 3:16.560

Medalists
gold medal	Anna Morris	Great Britain
silver medal	Chloé Dygert	United States
bronze medal	Bryony Botha	New Zealand

The Women's individual pursuit competition at the 2024 UCI Track Cycling World Championships was held on 19 October 2024.

== Results ==
=== Qualifying ===
The qualifying was held at 14:33. The two fasters riders race for gold, the third and fourth fastest riders race for bronze.

Rank	Name	Nation	Time	Behind	Notes
1	Chloé Dygert	United States	3:15.663		QG, WR
2	Anna Morris	Great Britain	3:17.656	+1.993	QG
3	Bryony Botha	New Zealand	3:19.446	+3.783	QB
4	Franziska Brauße	Germany	3:21.951	+6.288	QB
5	Federica Venturelli	Italy	3:23.735	+8.072	
6	Megan Barker	Great Britain	3:24.066	+8.403	
7	Alberte Greve	Denmark	3:26.121	+10.458	
8	Mieke Kröger	Germany	3:26.274	+10.611	
9	Martina Alzini	Italy	3:28.369	+12.706	
10	Emily Ehrlich	United States	3:28.964	+13.301	
11	Ariane Bonhomme	Canada	3:29.969	+14.306	
12	Isabella Escalera	Spain	3:30.425	+14.762	
13	Maho Kakita	Japan	3:30.850	+15.187	
14	Martyna Szczęsna	Poland	3:32.542	+16.879	
15	Fiona Majendie	Canada	3:32.576	+16.913	
16	Lucy Bénézet Minns	Ireland	3:36.612	+20.949	
17	Tetiana Yashchenko	Ukraine	3:39.463	+23.800	
18	Zhou Menghan	China	3:43.526	+27.863	
19	Meenakshi Rohilla	India	3:52.684	+37.021	
	Josie Knight	Great Britain	Did not start		

=== Finals ===
The finals were started at 20:46.

Rank	Name	Nation	Time	Behind
Gold medal race
1st place, gold medalist(s)	Anna Morris	Great Britain	3:16.560	
2nd place, silver medalist(s)	Chloé Dygert	United States	3:16.877	+0.317
Bronze medal race
3rd place, bronze medalist(s)	Bryony Botha	New Zealand	3:21.086	
4	Franziska Brauße	Germany	3:24.620	+3.534
