= 2026 UEC European Track Championships – Women's madison =

Women's madison at the 2026 UEC Track Elite European Championships
- Venue: Konya Velodrome, Konya
- Date: 5 February
- Competitors: 26 from 13 nations
- Teams: 13
- Winning points: 50

Medalists
gold medal	Lotte Kopecky; Shari Bossuyt	Belgium
silver medal	Katie Archibald; Anna Morris	Great Britain
bronze medal	Elisa Balsamo; Federica Venturelli	Italy

The women's madison competition at the 2026 UEC European Track Championships was held on 5 February 2026.

== Results ==
120 laps (30 km) with 12 sprints were raced.

Rank	Name	Nation	Lap points	Sprint points	Finish order	Total points
1st place, gold medalist(s)	Lotte Kopecky; Shari Bossuyt	Belgium	20	30	10	50
2nd place, silver medalist(s)	Katie Archibald; Anna Morris	Great Britain	0	27	3	27
3rd place, bronze medalist(s)	Elisa Balsamo; Federica Venturelli	Italy	0	26	1	26
4	Clara Copponi; Victoire Berteau	France	0	19	4	19
5	Lea Lin Teutenberg; Lena Charlotte Reißner	Germany	0	15	7	15
6	Lisa van Belle; Yuli van der Molen	Netherlands	0	8	2	8
7	Michelle Andres; Lorena Leu	Switzerland	−20	5	8	−15
8	Wiktoria Pikulik; Maja Tracka	Poland	−20	2	5	−18
9	Ellen Hjøllund Klinge; Ida Fialla	Denmark	−20	2	6	−18
10	Petra Ševčíková; Gabriela Bártová	Czech Republic	−40	5	9	−35
11	Eva Anguela; Isabella Escalera	Spain	−40	4	11	−36
12	Emma Jeffers; Erin Grace Creighton	Ireland	−60	0	12	−60
13	Olivija Baleišytė; Akvilė Gedraitytė	Lithuania	−40	0	–	DNF
