= 2025 UCI Track Cycling World Championships – Women's madison =

Women's madison at the 2025 UCI Track Cycling World Championships
- Venue: Velódromo Peñalolén
- Location: Santiago, Chile
- Dates: 25 October
- Competitors: 36 from 18 nations
- Teams: 18
- Winning points: 30

Medalists
gold medal	Maddie Leech; Katie Archibald	Great Britain
silver medal	Victoire Berteau; Marion Borras	France
bronze medal	Chiara Consonni; Vittoria Guazzini	Italy

The Women's madison competition at the 2025 UCI Track Cycling World Championships was held on 25 October 2025.

== Results ==
The race was started at 18:12.

Rank	Riders	Nation	Laps points	Sprint points	Total points
1st place, gold medalist(s)	Maddie Leech; Katie Archibald	Great Britain	0	30	30
2nd place, silver medalist(s)	Victoire Berteau; Marion Borras	France	0	24	24
3rd place, bronze medalist(s)	Chiara Consonni; Vittoria Guazzini	Italy	0	20	20
4	Shari Bossuyt; Katrijn De Clercq	Belgium	0	15	15
5	Tsuyaka Uchino; Maho Kakita	Japan	0	8	8
6	Messane Bräutigam; Lea Lin Teutenberg	Germany	0	8	8
7	Bryony Botha; Samantha Donnelly	New Zealand	0	7	7
8	Lorena Leu; Aline Seitz	Switzerland	0	6	6
9	Alexandra Manly; Alyssa Polites	Australia	0	5	5
10	Laura Auerbach-Lind; Amalie Dideriksen	Denmark	0	3	3
11	Barbora Němcová; Petra Ševčíková	Czech Republic	–20	0	–20
12	Maja Tracka; Olga Wankiewicz	Poland	–20	0	–20
–	Lisa van Belle; Lorena Wiebes	Netherlands	Did not finish		
–	Bethany Ingram; Megan Jastrab	United States	Did not finish		
–	Ngaire Barraclough; Lily Plante	Canada	Did not finish		
–	Erin Creighton; Emma Jeffers	Ireland	Did not finish		
–	Elizabeth Castaño; Lina Hernández	Colombia	Did not finish		
–	Javiera Garrido; Marlen Rojas	Chile	Did not finish		
