= 2022 Dwars door Vlaanderen for Women =

Cycling race

2022 UCI Women's ProSeries, race 3 of 8
- Event poster with previous winners Annemiek van Vleuten and Dylan van Baarle

Race details
- Dates: 30 March 2022
- Stages: 1
- Distance: 120 km (75 mi)
- Winning time: 3h 06' 40"

Results
	Winner	Chiara Consonni (ITA)	(Valcar–Travel & Service)
	Second	Julie De Wilde (BEL)	(Plantur–Pura)
	Third	Elise Chabbey (SWI)	(Canyon//SRAM)

The 2022 Dwars door Vlaanderen for Women was a road cycling one-day race that took place on 30 March 2022 in Belgium. It was the 10th edition of Dwars door Vlaanderen for Women and the 3rd event of the 2022 UCI Women's ProSeries.

It was won by Italian rider Chiara Consonni of Valcar–Travel & Service in a sprint finish.

== Teams ==
Thirteen UCI Women's WorldTeams and eleven UCI Women's ProTeams took part in the race.

UCI Women's WorldTeams

- Team BikeExchange–Jayco
- Canyon//SRAM
- Team DSM
- EF Education–Tibco–SVB
- FDJ Suez Futuroscope
- Human Powered Health
- Liv Racing Xstra
- Movistar Team
- Team Jumbo–Visma
- Roland Cogeas Edelweiss Squad
- Trek–Segafredo
- UAE Team ADQ
- Uno-X Pro Cycling Team

UCI Women's ProTeams

- AG Insurance–NXTG
- Andy Schleck–CP NVST–Immo Losch
- Arkéa Pro Cycling Team
- Bingoal Casino–Chevalmeire–Van Eyck Sport
- Cofidis
- IBCT
- Le Col–Wahoo
- Multum Accountants Ladies
- Parkhotel Valkenburg
- Plantur–Pura
- Valcar–Travel & Service

== Result ==
Result
Rank	Rider	Team	Time
1	Chiara Consonni (ITA)	Valcar–Travel & Service	3h 06' 40"
2	Julie De Wilde (BEL)	Plantur–Pura	+ 0"
3	Elise Chabbey (SWI)	Canyon//SRAM	+ 0"
4	Pfeiffer Georgi (GBR)	Team DSM	+ 0"
5	Marta Bastianelli (ITA)	UAE Team ADQ	+ 0"
6	Rachele Barbieri (ITA)	Liv Racing Xstra	+ 0"
7	Marie Le Net (FRA)	FDJ Suez Futuroscope	+ 0"
8	Shari Bossuyt (BEL)	Canyon//SRAM	+ 0"
9	Arlenis Sierra Canadilla (CUB)	Movistar Team	+ 0"
10	Karlijn Swinkels (NED)	Trek–Segafredo	+ 0"
