= 2025 UCI Track Cycling World Championships – Women's scratch =

Women's scratch at the 2025 UCI Track Cycling World Championships
- Venue: Peñalolén Velodrome
- Location: Santiago, Chile
- Dates: 22 October
- Competitors: 24 from 24 nations

Medalists
gold medal	Lorena Wiebes	Netherlands
silver medal	Amalie Dideriksen	Denmark
bronze medal	Prudence Fowler	New Zealand

The Women's scratch competition at the 2025 UCI Track Cycling World Championships was held on 22 October 2025.

== Results ==
The race was started at 19:00. First rider across the line without a net lap loss won.

Rank	Name	Nation	Laps down
1st place, gold medalist(s)	Lorena Wiebes	Netherlands	
2nd place, silver medalist(s)	Amalie Dideriksen	Denmark	
3rd place, bronze medalist(s)	Prudence Fowler	New Zealand	
4	Marion Borras	France	
5	Anita Stenberg	Norway	
6	Madelaine Leech	Great Britain	
7	Petra Ševčíková	Czech Republic	
8	Valeria Valgonen	Individual Neutral Athletes	
9	Bethany Ingram	United States	
10	Lena Charlotte Reißner	Germany	
11	Lorena Leu	Switzerland	
12	Emma Jeffers	Ireland	
13	Alexandra Volstad	Canada	
14	Mizuki Ikeda	Japan	
15	Ebtissam Mohamed	Egypt	
16	Eva Anguela	Spain	
17	Marith Vanhove	Belgium	
18	Claudia Marcks	Australia	
19	Nikol Płosaj	Poland	
20	Antonieta Gaxiola	Mexico	
21	Javiera Garrido	Chile	
22	Alžbeta Bačíková	Slovakia	
23	Martina Fidanza	Italy	
24	Olivija Baleišytė	Lithuania	
