= 2022 UCI Women's ProSeries =

- Third edition of the UCI Women's ProSeries

Details
- Dates: 26 February – 1 October 2022
- Location: Europe
- Races: 8

The 2022 UCI Women's ProSeries was the third season of the second-tier UCI Women's ProSeries road cycling tour, a competition with eight road cycling events throughout the 2022 women's cycling season. The tour sits below the UCI Women's World Tour but above the UCI Class 1 and Class 2 races. The competition began with the Omloop Het Nieuwsblad in February, and finished with the Giro dell'Emilia Internazionale Donne Elite in September.

== Events ==
The 2022 season consisted of 8 races, of which 5 are one-day races (1.Pro) and 3 are stage races (2.Pro). All races were held in Europe. The Giro Donne returned to the UCI Women's World Tour for 2022, following its demotion to the Women's ProSeries in 2021 due to a lack of live television coverage.

Races in the 2022 UCI Women's ProSeries
Race	Date	Winner	Team	Ref.
(Belgium) Omloop Het Nieuwsblad	26 February	Annemiek van Vleuten (NED)	Movistar Team	
(Belgium) Nokere Koerse	16 March	Lorena Wiebes (NED)	Team DSM	
(Belgium) Dwars door Vlaanderen	30 March	Chiara Consonni (ITA)	Valcar–Travel & Service	
(Belgium) Brabantse Pijl	12 April	Demi Vollering (NED)	SD Worx	
(Luxembourg) Grand Prix Elsy Jacobs	29 April – 1 May	Marta Bastianelli (ITA)	UAE Team ADQ	
(Germany) Thüringen Ladies Tour	24–29 May	Alexandra Manly (AUS)	Team BikeExchange–Jayco	
(Switzerland) Tour de Suisse Women	18–21 June	Lucinda Brand (NED)	Trek–Segafredo	
(Italy) Giro dell'Emilia Internazionale Donne Elite	1 October	Elisa Longo Borghini (ITA)	Trek–Segafredo	
