= 2026 UCI Track Cycling World Championships – Women's points race =

Women's points race at the 2026 UCI Track Cycling World Championships
- Venue: Shanghai Velodrome
- Location: Shanghai, China
- Dates: 18 October
- Competitors: 23 from 23 nations
- Winning points: 42

Medalists
gold medal	Lara Gillespie	Ireland
silver medal	Amalie Dideriksen	Denmark
bronze medal	Shari Bossuyt	Belgium

The Women's points race competition at the 2026 UCI Track Cycling World Championships was held on 18 October 2026.

== Results ==
100 laps (25 km) were raced with 10 sprints.

Rank	Name	Nation	Lap points	Sprint points	Finish order	Total points
1st place, gold medalist(s)	Lara Gillespie	Ireland	20	22	2	42
2nd place, silver medalist(s)	Amalie Dideriksen	Denmark	20	17	4	37
3rd place, bronze medalist(s)	Shari Bossuyt	Belgium	20	15	3	35
4	Yareli Acevedo	Mexico	0	13	1	13
5	Sofie van Rooijen	Netherlands	0	10	8	10
6	Anna Hicks	United States	0	9	10	9
7	Lisa Klein	Germany	0	8	5	8
8	Erin Boothman	Great Britain	0	7	13	7
9	Aline Seitz	Switzerland	0	4	6	4
10	Marion Borras	France	0	4	17	4
11	Bryony Botha	New Zealand	0	2	16	2
12	Rachele Barbieri	Italy	0	2	20	2
13	Daniela Campos	Portugal	0	0	7	0
14	Anita Stenberg	Norway	0	0	11	0
15	Sophie Edwards	Australia	−20	4	14	−16
16	Leung Wing Yee	Hong Kong	−20	0	9	−20
17	Yumi Kajihara	Japan	−20	0	15	−20
18	Wei Suwan	China	−40	3	12	−37
19	Eva Yaguez	Spain	−40	0	18	−40
20	Vendula Strakatá	Czechia	−40	0	19	−40
21	Alexi Ramirez	Trinidad and Tobago	−40	0	–	DNF
21	Ebtissam Zayed	Egypt	−60	1	–	DNF
21	Nafosat Kozieva	Uzbekistan	−40	0	–	DNF
