= 2025 UEC European Track Championships – Women's individual pursuit =

Women's individual pursuit at the 2025 UEC European Track Championships
- Venue: Velodroom Limburg, Heusden-Zolder
- Date: 15 February
- Competitors: 19 from 14 nations
- Winning time: 4:25.874

Medalists
gold medal	Anna Morris	Great Britain
silver medal	Vittoria Guazzini	Italy
bronze medal	Mieke Kröger	Germany

The women's individual pursuit competition at the 2025 UEC European Track Championships was held on 15 February 2025.

== Results ==
=== Qualifying ===
The first two racers raced for gold, the third and fourth fastest rider raced for the bronze medal.

Rank	Name	Nation	Time	Behind	Notes
1	Anna Morris	Great Britain	4:28.306		QG, WR
2	Vittoria Guazzini	Italy	4:31.545	+3.239	QG
3	Mieke Kröger	Germany	4:33.494	+5.188	QB
4	Lisa Klein	Germany	4:36.892	+8.586	QB
5	Lisa van Belle	Netherlands	4:39.711	+11.405	
6	Sophie Lewis	Great Britain	4:40.381	+12.075	
7	Jasmin Liechti	Switzerland	4:41.843	+13.537	
8	Martyna Szczęsna	Poland	4:43.841	+15.535	
9	Luca Vierstraete	Belgium	4:44.414	+16.108	
10	Isabella Escalera	Spain	4:46.382	+18.076	
11	Fabienne Buri	Switzerland	4:50.327	+22.021	
12	Martina Alzini	Italy	4:51.114	+22.808	
13	Aoife O'Brien	Ireland	4:53.596	+25.290	
14	Elina Cabot	France	4:53.636	+25.330	
15	Leila Gschwentner	Austria	4:55.379	+27.073	
16	Karalina Biryuk	Individual Neutral Athletes	4:56.397	+28.091	
17	Viktoriia Yaroshenko	Ukraine	5:02.619	+34.313	
18	Margrethe Hansen	Denmark	5:05.117	+36.811	
19	Mélanie Dupin	France	5:10.900	+42.594	
	Febe Jooris	Belgium	Did not start		

=== Finals ===
Rank	Name	Nation	Time	Behind	Notes
Gold medal final
1st place, gold medalist(s)	Anna Morris	Great Britain	4:25.874		WR
2nd place, silver medalist(s)	Vittoria Guazzini	Italy	4:34.098	+8.224	
Bronze medal final
3rd place, bronze medalist(s)	Mieke Kröger	Germany	4:33.451		
4	Lisa Klein	Germany	4:39.970	+6.519	
