= 2024 UEC European Track Championships – Women's individual pursuit =

Women's individual pursuit at the 2024 UEC European Track Championships
- Venue: Omnisport Apeldoorn, Apeldoorn
- Date: 14 January
- Competitors: 15 from 10 nations
- Winning time: 3:22.816

Medalists
gold medal	Josie Knight	Great Britain
silver medal	Franziska Brauße	Germany
bronze medal	Anna Morris	Great Britain

The women's individual pursuit competition at the 2024 UEC European Track Championships was held on 14 January 2024.

== Results ==
=== Qualifying ===
The first two racers raced for gold, the third and fourth fastest rider raced for the bronze medal.

Rank	Name	Nation	Time	Behind	Notes
1	Franziska Brauße	Germany	3:22.574		QG
2	Josie Knight	Great Britain	3:23.028	+0.454	QG
3	Anna Morris	Great Britain	3:23.506	+0.932	QB
4	Federica Venturelli	Italy	3:29.283	+6.709	QB
5	Martina Alzini	Italy	3:30.614	+8.040	
6	Kelly Murphy	Ireland	3:31.842	+9.268	
7	Olga Wankiewicz	Poland	3:36.269	+13.695	
8	Alberte Greve	Denmark	3:37.316	+14.742	
9	Mieke Kröger	Germany	3:37.556	+14.982	
10	Leila Gschwentner	Austria	3:38.848	+16.274	
11	Isabella Escalera	Spain	3:39.455	+16.881	
12	Annika Liehner	Switzerland	3:42.247	+19.673	
13	Patrycja Lorkowska	Poland	3:42.541	+19.967	
14	Arina Korotieieva	Ukraine	3:46.442	+23.868	
15	Erin Creighton	Ireland	3:48.686	+26.112	

=== Finals ===
Rank	Name	Nation	Time	Behind	Notes
Gold medal final
1st place, gold medalist(s)	Josie Knight	Great Britain	3:22.816		
2nd place, silver medalist(s)	Franziska Brauße	Germany	3:22.819	+0.003	
Bronze medal final
3rd place, bronze medalist(s)	Anna Morris	Great Britain	3:22.934		
4	Federica Venturelli	Italy	3:27.475	+4.541	
