= 2026 UEC European Track Championships – Women's omnium =

Women's omnium at the 2026 UEC European Track Championships
- Venue: Konya Velodrome, Konya
- Date: 3 February
- Competitors: 21
- Winning points: 132

Medalists
gold medal	Anna Morris	Great Britain
silver medal	Anita Stenberg	Norway
bronze medal	Shari Bossuyt	Belgium

The women's omnium competition at the 2026 UEC European Track Championships was held on 3 February 2026.

== Results ==
Rank	Name	Nation	SR	TR	ER	Subtotal	Points race			Total points
Rank	Name	Nation	SR	TR	ER	Subtotal	Lap points	Sprint points	Finish order	Total points
1st place, gold medalist(s)	Anna Morris	Great Britain	32	40	38	110	0	22	4	132
2nd place, silver medalist(s)	Anita Stenberg	Norway	26	36	40	102	0	17	3	119
3rd place, bronze medalist(s)	Shari Bossuyt	Belgium	36	38	36	110	0	9	15	119
4	Elisa Balsamo	Italy	6	34	30	70	20	11	2	101
5	Clara Copponi	France	20	32	34	86	0	13	1	99
6	Petra Ševčíková	Czechia	34	22	32	88	0	0	6	88
7	Lea Lin Teutenberg	Germany	40	26	6	72	0	8	18	80
8	Michelle Andres	Switzerland	24	24	26	74	0	3	8	77
9	Valeriya Valgonen	Individual Neutral Athletes	28	18	28	74	0	0	11	74
10	Maja Tracka	Poland	30	16	22	68	0	2	7	70
11	Ida Fialla	Denmark	10	30	18	58	0	2	5	60
12	Eva Anguela	Spain	38	6	14	58	0	2	19	60
13	Lisa van Belle	Netherlands	12	28	10	50	0	6	12	56
14	Aoife O'Brien	Ireland	16	20	16	52	0	1	10	53
15	Akvilė Gedraitytė	Lithuania	14	12	20	46	0	3	14	49
16	Lucy Nelson	Bulgaria	22	10	12	44	0	0	16	44
17	Daniela Campos	Portugal	18	14	2	34	0	0	17	34
18	Milana Ushakova	Ukraine	4	4	24	32	0	0	9	32
19	Hanna Tserakh	Individual Neutral Athletes	8	8	4	20	0	0	13	20
20	Nora Jenčušová	Slovakia	2	2	8	12	0	0	DNF	12
	Reyhan Yakışır	Turkey	−39	DNS	—N/a				—	DNF
