= Vittoria Guazzini =

Italian cyclist (born 2000)

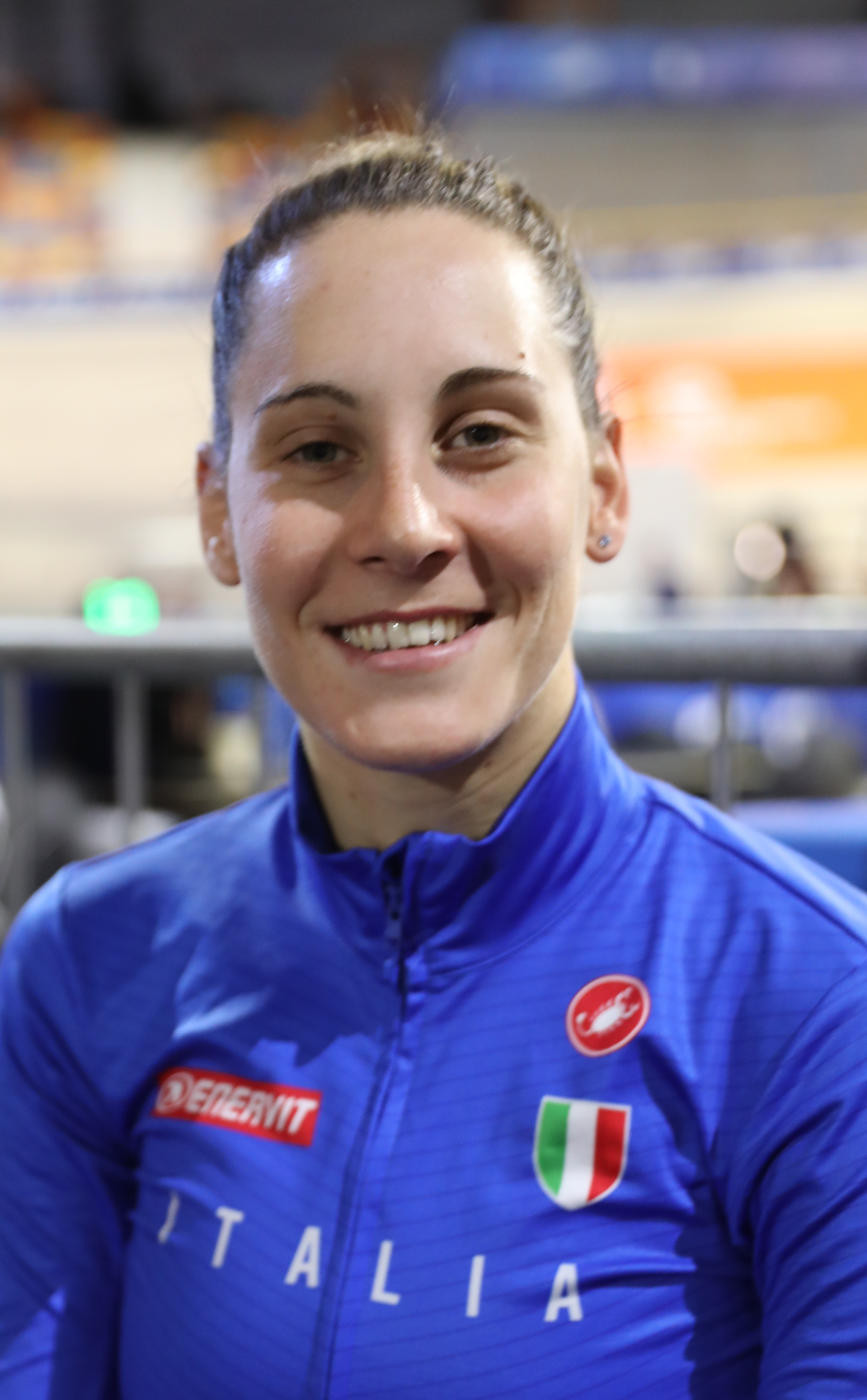
- Guazzini in 2024

Personal information
- Born: 26 December 2000 (age 25) Pontedera, Italy

Cycling career
- Sport: Cycling
- Current team: FDJ United–Suez
- Disciplines: Road; Track
- Role: Rider

Professional teams
- 2019–2021: Valcar–Cylance
- 2022–: FDJ Nouvelle-Aquitaine Futuroscope

Major wins
- Road One-day races and Classics National Time Trial Championships (2024) Track Olympic Games Madison (2024) World Championships Team pursuit (2022, 2025)
Medal record
Representing Italy
Women's track cycling
Olympic Games
Gold medal – first place	2024 Paris	Madison
World Championships
Gold medal – first place	2022 Saint-Quentin-en-Yvelines	Team pursuit
Gold medal – first place	2025 Santiago	Team pursuit
Silver medal – second place	2026 Shanghai	Team pursuit
Bronze medal – third place	2024 Ballerup	Team pursuit
Bronze medal – third place	2025 Santiago	Madison
European Championships
Gold medal – first place	2020 Plovdiv	Madison
Gold medal – first place	2024 Apeldoorn	Team pursuit
Gold medal – first place	2025 Heusden-Zolder	Team pursuit
Silver medal – second place	2020 Plovdiv	Team pursuit
Silver medal – second place	2022 Munich	Team pursuit
Silver medal – second place	2023 Grenchen	Team pursuit
Silver medal – second place	2025 Heusden-Zolder	Individual pursuit
Silver medal – second place	2025 Heusden-Zolder	Madison
Bronze medal – third place	2019 Apeldoorn	Team pursuit
Bronze medal – third place	2022 Munich	Individual pursuit
Bronze medal – third place	2023 Grenchen	Madison
Bronze medal – third place	2024 Apeldoorn	Madison
Women's road bicycle racing
World Championships
Gold medal – first place	2022 Wollongong	Under-23 time trial
Silver medal – second place	2022 Wollongong	Team relay
European Championships
Gold medal – first place	2024 Limburg	Mixed team relay
Silver medal – second place	2022 Anadia	Under-23 road race
Silver medal – second place	2022 Anadia	Under-23 time trial
Silver medal – second place	2023 Drenthe	Mixed team relay
Silver medal – second place	2025 Guilherand-Granges	Mixed team relay
Mediterranean Games
Gold medal – first place	2022 Oran	Time trial

Vittoria Guazzini (born 26 December 2000) is an Italian professional racing cyclist, who currently rides for UCI Women's WorldTeam FDJ United–Suez. She is also a member of Gruppo Sportivo Fiamme Oro, the sport section of Polizia di Stato, one of the national police forces.

== Major results ==
=== Road ===
2018
UEC European Junior Championships

1st Time trial
2nd Road race

National Junior Championships

1st Time trial
1st Road race

3rd Piccolo Trofeo Alfredo Binda
2019
3rd Team relay, UEC European Championships
2020
3rd Team relay, UEC European Championships
3rd Time trial, National Championships
2021
1st Time trial, UEC European Under-23 Championships
4th Dwars door Vlaanderen
2022
1st UCI Road World Championships – Women's under-23 time trial
1st Time trial, Mediterranean Games
2nd UCI Road World Championships – Mixed team relay
3rd Le Samyn
4th UCI Road World Championships – Women's time trial
2023
2nd Team relay, UEC European Championships
3rd Trofeo Alfredo Binda
3rd Le Samyn
4th Time trial, National Championships
4th Dwars door Vlaanderen
7th Tour of Guangxi
7th Ronde van Drenthe
2024
UEC European Championships

1st Team relay
5th Time trial

1st Time trial, National Championships
1st Stage 1 Tour Féminin International des Pyrénées
1st Le Samyn
6th Ronde van Drenthe
2025
7th Dwars door Vlaanderen
2026
1st UCI Road World Championships – Mixed team relay
10th UCI Road World Championships – Women's time trial

=== Track ===
2017
1st Team pursuit, UCI World Junior Championships
1st Team pursuit, UEC European Junior Championships
2018
UCI World Junior Championships

1st Omnium
1st Individual pursuit
1st Team pursuit

UEC European Junior Championships

1st Omnium
1st Individual pursuit
1st Madison (with Gloria Scarsi)

3rd Team pursuit, UCI World Cup, London
2019
UEC European Under-23 Championships

1st Team pursuit
2nd Individual pursuit

3rd Team pursuit, UEC European Championships
UCI World Cup

3rd Team pursuit, Minsk
3rd Team pursuit, Glasgow
3rd Madison, Hong Kong (with Chiara Consonni)

2020
UEC European Under-23 Championships

1st Team pursuit
2nd Individual pursuit

2022
1st Team pursuit, UCI World Championships
2024
1st Madison, Olympic Games (with Chiara Consonni)
2025
UCI World Championships

1st Team pursuit
3rd Madison (with Chiara Consonni)

== See also ==
- Italian sportswomen multiple medalists at Olympics and World Championships
