= 2023 UEC European Track Championships – Women's points race =

Women's points race at the 2023 UEC European Track Championships
- Venue: Tissot Velodrome, Munich
- Date: 11 February
- Competitors: 18 from 18 nations
- Winning points: 56

Medalists
| gold medal | Anita Stenberg | Norway |
| silver medal | Shari Bossuyt | Belgium |
| bronze medal | Marie Le Net | France |

The women's points race competition at the 2023 UEC European Track Championships was held on 11 February 2023.

== Results ==
100 laps (25 km) were raced with ten sprints.

| Rank | Name | Nation | Lap points | Sprint points | Finish order | Total points |
|---|---|---|---|---|---|---|
| 1st place, gold medalist(s) | Anita Stenberg | Norway | 20 | 36 | 3 | 56 |
| 2nd place, silver medalist(s) | Shari Bossuyt | Belgium | 20 | 22 | 1 | 42 |
| 3rd place, bronze medalist(s) | Marie Le Net | France | 20 | 14 | 8 | 34 |
| 4 | Marit Raaijmakers | Netherlands | 20 | 9 | 9 | 29 |
| 5 | Silvia Zanardi | Italy | 0 | 12 | 12 | 12 |
| 6 | Maria Martins | Portugal | 0 | 9 | 2 | 9 |
| 7 | Neah Evans | Great Britain | 0 | 8 | 5 | 8 |
| 8 | Verena Eberhardt | Austria | 0 | 5 | 4 | 5 |
| 9 | Mia Griffin | Ireland | 0 | 4 | 6 | 4 |
| 10 | Karolina Karasiewicz | Poland | 0 | 2 | 15 | 2 |
| 11 | Argiro Milaki | Greece | 0 | 0 | 7 | 0 |
| 12 | Léna Mettraux | Switzerland | 0 | 0 | 10 | 0 |
| 13 | Kristýna Burlová | Czech Republic | 0 | 0 | 11 | 0 |
| 14 | Laura Süßemilch | Germany | 0 | 0 | 13 | 0 |
| 15 | Ziortza Isasi | Spain | –20 | 0 | 14 | –20 |
| 16 | Zsuzsanna Kercsó-Magos | Hungary | –60 | 0 | – | DNF |
| 16 | Anna Kolyzhuk | Ukraine | –60 | 0 | – | DNF |
| 18 | Olivija Baleišytė | Lithuania | 0 | 0 | – | DNF |
