= Anna Morris =

Welsh cyclist (born 1995)

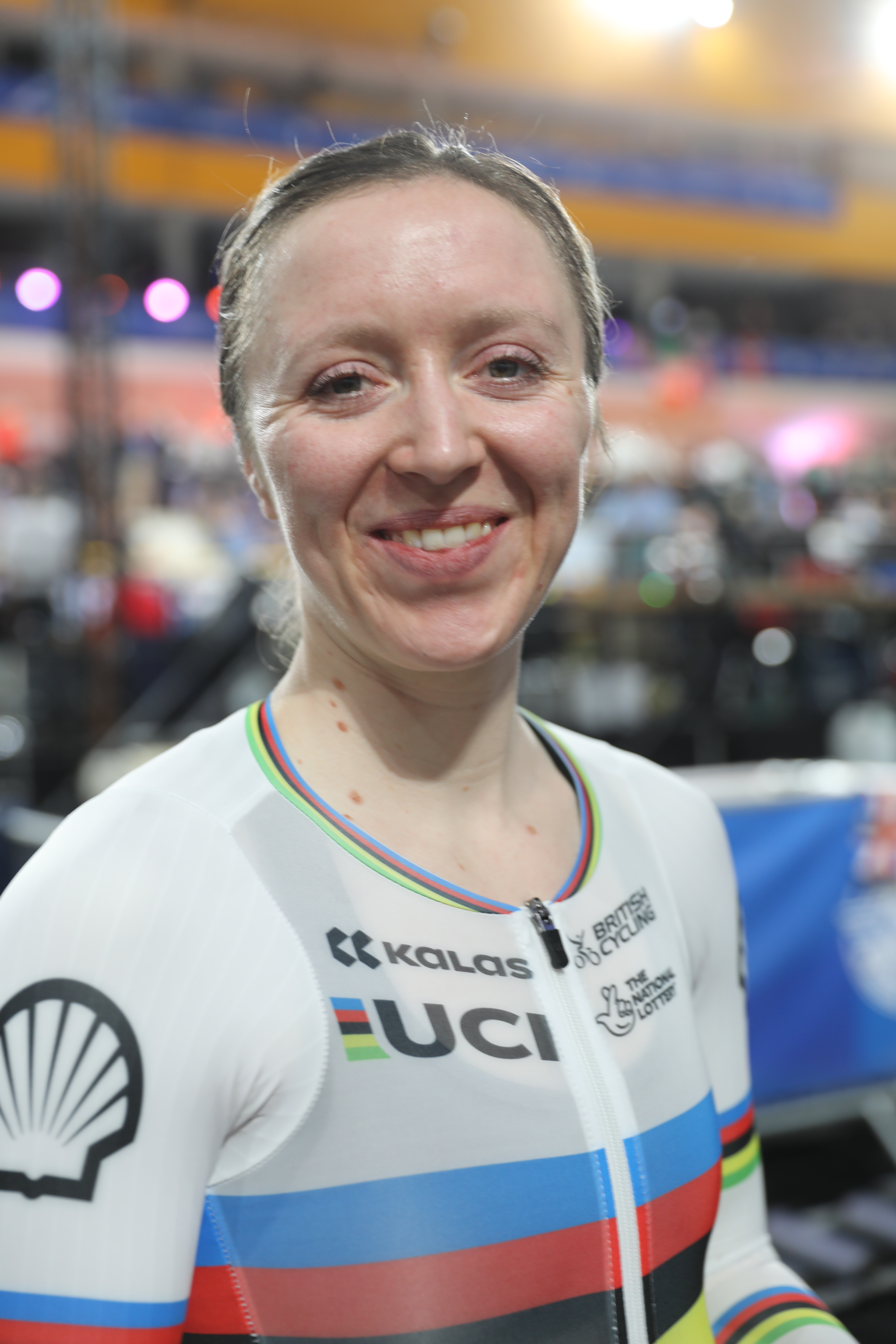
- Morris in 2024

Personal information
- Born: 13 June 1995 (age 31) Cardiff, Wales

Cycling career
- Sport: Cycling
- Discipline: Track

Major wins
- Track World Championships Madison (2026) Omnium (2026) Individual pursuit (2024, 2025) Team pursuit (2023, 2024, 2026)
Medal record
Women's track cycling
Representing Great Britain
Olympic Games
Bronze medal – third place	2024 Paris	Team pursuit
World Championships
Gold medal – first place	2023 Glasgow	Team pursuit
Gold medal – first place	2024 Ballerup	Individual pursuit
Gold medal – first place	2024 Ballerup	Team pursuit
Gold medal – first place	2025 Santiago	Individual pursuit
Gold medal – first place	2026 Shanghai	Omnium
Gold medal – first place	2026 Shanghai	Team pursuit
Gold medal – first place	2026 Shanghai	Madison
Silver medal – second place	2022 Saint-Quentin-en-Yvelines	Team pursuit
Silver medal – second place	2025 Santiago	Points race
Bronze medal – third place	2025 Santiago	Team pursuit
European Championships
Gold medal – first place	2023 Grenchen	Team pursuit
Gold medal – first place	2025 Heusden-Zolder	Individual pursuit
Gold medal – first place	2026 Konya	Omnium
Gold medal – first place	2026 Konya	Team pursuit
Silver medal – second place	2024 Apeldoorn	Team pursuit
Silver medal – second place	2026 Konya	Madison
Bronze medal – third place	2024 Apeldoorn	Individual pursuit
Bronze medal – third place	2025 Heusden-Zolder	Team pursuit
Representing Wales
Commonwealth Games
Gold medal – first place	2026 Glasgow	Individual pursuit
Gold medal – first place	2026 Glasgow	Points race
Bronze medal – third place	2026 Glasgow	Team pursuit

Anna Morris (born 13 June 1995) is a Welsh track cyclist. She is a seven-time world champion across the madison, omnium, team pursuit and individual pursuit disciplines. At the 2026 Commonwealth Games, she won gold medals in the individual pursuit and the points race.

== Career ==
Morris was a latecomer to cycling, only taking up the sport while studying medicine at the University of Southampton. She had a breakout year in 2022, earning three medals at the British National Track Championships before going on to represent Wales at the 2022 Commonwealth Games in Birmingham. Morris earned her first global medal when part of the team pursuit squad that took silver at the UCI Track World Championships in October 2022.

She won two golds at the 2024 UCI Track Cycling World Championships in Ballerup, Denmark, taking both the individual pursuit (defeating Chloe Dygert in the final), and the team pursuit titles.

On February 15, 2025, Morris won the women’s 4000 metre individual pursuit at the European Track Championships, and set a new world record in that event twice that day, by setting a world record time of 4:28.306 in the qualifying ride and then a new world record time of 4:25.874 in the final. On February 22, 2025, Morris once again beat her 4000 metre individual pursuit world record, with a new time of 4:24.060, at the national championships.

In October, Morris was part of the team pursuit line-up that won bronze at the 2025 UCI Track Cycling World Championships. She then retained her world title in the individual pursuit. She concluded her championships with a silver medal in the points race.

At the 2026 European Championships in Konya, Morris was a member of the British quartet who won the gold medal in the final of the team pursuit. The team consisting of Morris, Katie Archibald, Josie Knight and Millie Couzens also set a new world record of 4:02.808 in the final against Germany. She secured a further gold medal in the omnium, and then concluded her championships with a silver medal in the madison with Archibald. In June 2026, she finished second at the British National Time Trial Championships.

At the 2026 Commonwealth Games in Glasgow, Morris, along with Jessica Roberts, Megan Barker and Ciara Oliva, won the bronze medal for Wales after defeating England in the team pursuit. One day later, she won a gold medal in the individual pursuit, after overcoming England's Knight in the gold medal race. In the scratch race, she crossed the finish line in second place, but was later relegated following a rules infraction on track, and she missed out on a medal. She then won her second gold medal of the Games with victory in the 25 km points race.

At the 2026 UCI Track Cycling World Championships in Shanghai, Morris, Knight, Couzens and Erin Boothman became world champions in the team pursuit after overcoming Italy in the final. One day later, she became world champion in the omnium. During the event, she finished third in the scratch and elimination races, and first in the tempo race, before sealing the world title by holding off Japan's Tsuyaka Uchino in the points race to win gold. She then secured her third world title of the competition, after partnering Boothman to victory in the madison. The duo finished seven points ahead of the French pairing. She became the first woman to win these three events at a single World Championships since the madison was first included in the racing programme in 2017.

== Major results ==
=== Road ===
2023
2nd Time trial, National Championships
2025
4th Time trial, National Championships
2026
National Championships

2nd Time trial
5th Road race

=== Track ===
2022
2nd Team pursuit, UCI World Championships
National Championships

2nd Scratch
2nd Individual pursuit
3rd Points race

2023
1st Team pursuit, UCI World Championships
1st Team pursuit, UEC European Championships
2024
UCI World Championships

1st Individual pursuit
1st Team pursuit

2nd Team pursuit, UEC European Championships
3rd Team pursuit, Olympic Games
2025
UCI World Championships

1st Individual pursuit
2nd Points race
3rd Team pursuit

UEC European Championships

1st Individual pursuit
2nd Points race
3rd Team pursuit

National Championships

1st Individual pursuit
1st Scratch
1st Omnium
1st Madison (with Erin Boothman)

2026
UCI World Championships

1st Madison (with Erin Boothman)
1st Omnium
1st Team pursuit

UEC European Championships

1st Team pursuit
1st Omnium
2nd Madison (with Katie Archibald)

National Championships

1st Points race
1st Scratch
2nd Individual pursuit
2nd Elimination

Commonwealth Games

1st Individual pursuit
1st Points race
3rd Team pursuit
