= Aida Nuño =

Spanish cyclist (born 1983)

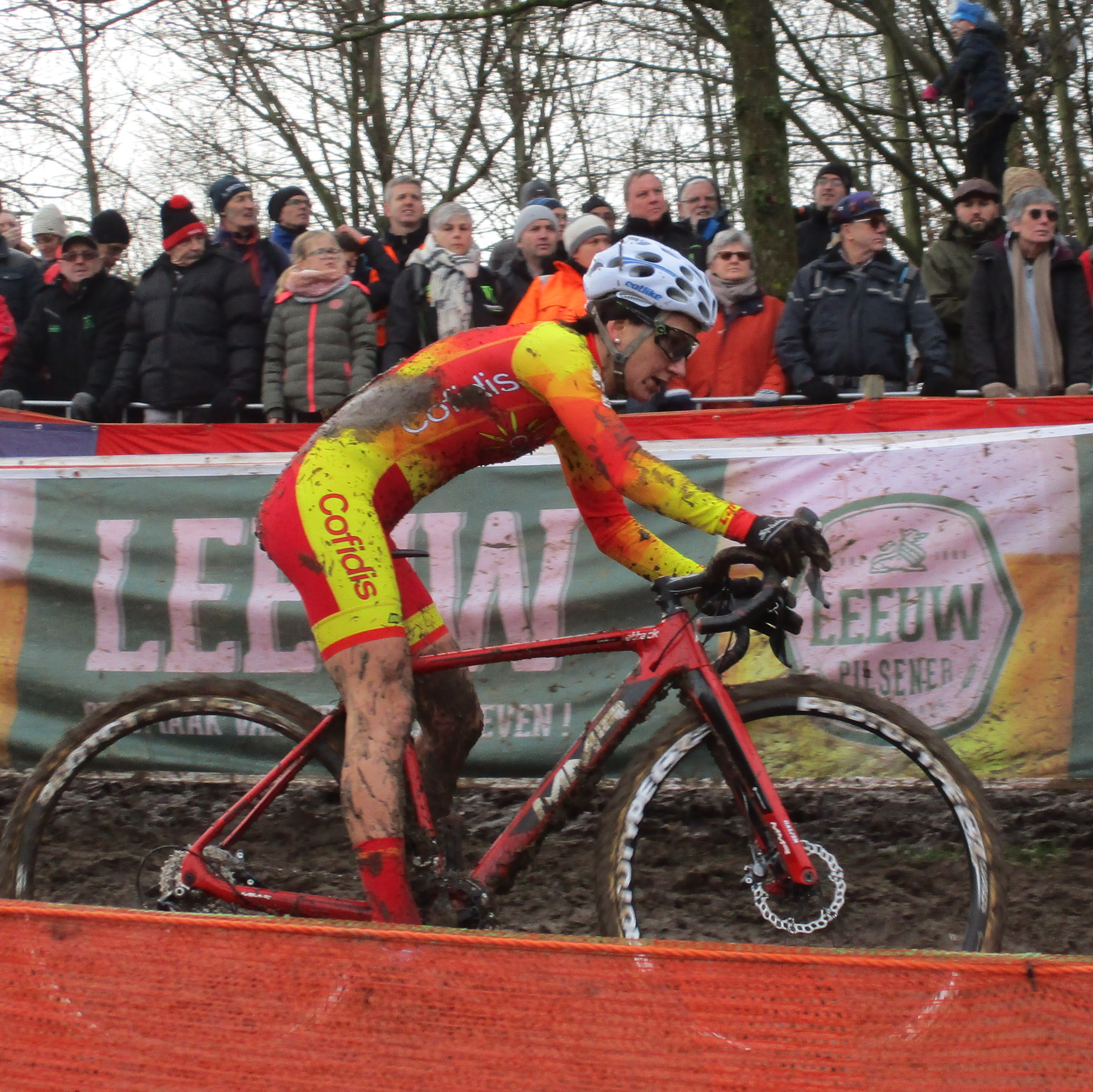
- Nuño in 2018

Personal information
- Full name: Aida Nuño Palacio
- Born: 24 November 1983 (age 42)

Cycling career
- Sport: Cycling
- Current team: Cantabria Deporte–Río Miera
- Disciplines: Road; Cyclo-cross
- Role: Rider

Amateur team
- 2018–2019: Río Miera–Cantabria Deporte

Professional teams
- 2014–2015: Lointek
- 2020–: Río Miera–Cantabria Deporte

Aida Nuno Palacio (born 24 November 1983) is a Spanish road racing and cyclo-cross cyclist, who currently rides for UCI Women's Continental Team Cantabria Deporte–Río Miera. She represented her nation in the women's elite event at the 2016 UCI Cyclo-cross World Championships in Heusden-Zolder.
