= 2022 Omloop Het Nieuwsblad (women's race) =

2022 UCI Women's ProSeries, race 1 of 8
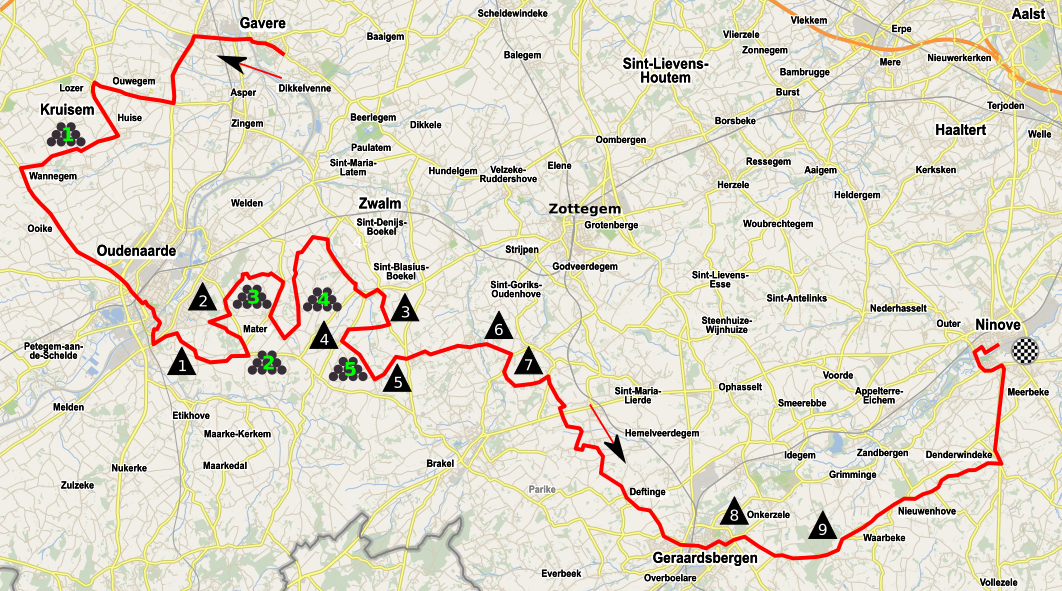
- Route of the final section of the race

Race details
- Dates: 26 February 2022
- Stages: 1
- Distance: 128.4 km (79.8 mi)
- Winning time: 3h 25' 54"

Results
	Winner	Annemiek van Vleuten (NED)	(Movistar Team)
	Second	Demi Vollering (NED)	(SD Worx)
	Third	Lorena Wiebes (NED)	(Team DSM)

The 2022 Omloop Het Nieuwsblad was the 17th edition of the women's Omloop Het Nieuwsblad road cycling one-day race which was held on 26 February. The race was a 1.Pro event on the women's international calendar, part of the UCI Women's ProSeries. The race followed a similar route to that of the men's race, but was shorter and more straightforward at only 128.4 kilometres (79.8 mi), starting in Ghent and finishing in Ninove.

The race was won by Dutch rider Annemiek van Vleuten (Movistar Team) for the second time, beating Dutch rival Demi Vollering (SD Worx) in a two-up sprint for the finish.

== Result ==
Final general classification
Rank	Rider	Team	Time
1	Annemiek van Vleuten (NED)	Movistar Team	3h 25' 54"
2	Demi Vollering (NED)	SD Worx	+ 0"
3	Lorena Wiebes (NED)	Team DSM	+ 25"
4	Elisa Balsamo (ITA)	Trek–Segafredo	+ 25"
5	Clara Copponi (FRA)	FDJ Nouvelle-Aquitaine Futuroscope	+ 25"
6	Emma Norsgaard (DEN)	Movistar Team	+ 25"
7	Anna Henderson (GBR)	Team Jumbo–Visma	+ 25"
8	Maria Giulia Confalonieri (ITA)	Ceratizit–WNT Pro Cycling	+ 25"
9	Marta Bastianelli (ITA)	UAE Team ADQ	+ 25"
10	Julie Norman Leth (DEN)	Uno-X Pro Cycling Team	+ 25"

== See also ==
- 2022 in women's road cycling
