= Cycling at the 2023 Pan American Games – Women's omnium =

Women's omnium at the 2023 Pan American Games
- Venue: Velodrome
- Dates: October 26
- Competitors: 13 from 13 nations

Medalists
Gold medal	Yareli Acevedo	Mexico
Silver medal	Lina Hernández	Colombia
Bronze medal	Catalina Soto	Chile

The women's omnium competition of the cycling events at the 2023 Pan American Games was held on October 26 at the Velodrome in Santiago, Chile.

== Schedule ==
Date	Time	Round
October 26, 2023	11:19	Scratch
October 26, 2023	12:04	Tempo Race
October 26, 2023	18:18	Elimination
October 26, 2023	19:38	Points Race

== Results ==
=== Scratch ===
The race was started at 11:19.

Rank	Name	Nation	Laps down	Event points
1	Alexi Costa	Trinidad and Tobago		40
2	Amber Joseph	Barbados		38
3	Colleen Gulick	United States		36
4	Yareli Acevedo	Mexico		34
5	Catalina Soto	Chile		32
6	Lina Hernández	Colombia		30
7	Wellyda Dos Santos	Brazil		28
8	Verónica Abreu	Venezuela		26
9	Devaney Collier	Canada		24
10	Maribel Aguirre	Argentina		22
11	Claudia Baró	Cuba		20
12	Jasmín Soto	Independent Athletes Team		18
13	Flor Espiritusanto	Dominican Republic		16

=== Tempo Race ===
The race was started at 12:24.

Rank	Name	Nation	Lap points	Total points	Event points
1	Catalina Soto	Chile	20	27	40
2	Lina Hernández	Colombia		10	38
3	Verónica Abreu	Venezuela		4	36
4	Yareli Acevedo	Mexico		3	34
5	Colleen Gulick	United States		1	32
6	Amber Joseph	Barbados		1	30
7	Jasmín Soto	Independent Athletes Team			28
8	Maribel Aguirre	Argentina			26
9	Claudia Baró	Cuba			24
10	Alexi Costa	Trinidad and Tobago			22
11	Devaney Collier	Canada			20
12	Wellyda Dos Santos	Brazil	-20	-20	18
13	Flor Espiritusanto	Dominican Republic	-20	-20	16

=== Elimination ===
The race was started at 18:18.

Rank	Name	Nation	Event points
1	Yareli Acevedo	Mexico	40
2	Lina Hernández	Colombia	38
3	Catalina Soto	Chile	36
4	Devaney Collier	Canada	34
5	Colleen Gulick	United States	32
6	Wellyda Dos Santos	Brazil	30
7	Alexi Costa	Trinidad and Tobago	28
8	Verónica Abreu	Venezuela	26
9	Maribel Aguirre	Argentina	24
10	Amber Joseph	Barbados	22
11	Claudia Baró	Cuba	20
12	Flor Espiritusanto	Dominican Republic	18
13	Jasmín Soto	Independent Athletes Team	16

=== Points Race ===
The race was started at 19:38.

Rank	Name	Nation	Lap points	Event points
1	Amber Joseph	Barbados		15
2	Devaney Collier	Canada	20	13
3	Yareli Acevedo	Mexico		23
4	Catalina Soto	Chile		12
5	Lina Hernández	Colombia		15
6	Colleen Gulick	United States		4
7	Verónica Abreu	Venezuela		0
8	Wellyda Dos Santos	Brazil		3
9	Maribel Aguirre	Argentina	20	12
10	Jasmín Soto	Independent Athletes Team		0
11	Alexi Costa	Trinidad and Tobago	20	5
12	Claudia Baró	Cuba		0
13	Flor Espiritusanto	Dominican Republic	-40	0

=== Final standings ===
The final classification is determined overall standings.

Rank	Name	Nation	Scratch	Tempo	Elimination	Points Race	Total
1st place, gold medalist(s)	Yareli Acevedo	Mexico	34	34	40	20	128
2nd place, silver medalist(s)	Lina Hernández	Colombia	30	38	38	15	121
3rd place, bronze medalist(s)	Catalina Soto	Chile	32	40	36	12	120
4	Alexi Costa	Trinidad and Tobago	40	22	28	25	115
5	Devaney Collier	Canada	24	20	34	33	111
6	Amber Joseph	Barbados	38	30	22	15	105
7	Colleen Gulick	United States	36	32	32	4	104
8	Maribel Aguirre	Argentina	22	26	24	32	104
9	Verónica Abreu	Venezuela	26	36	26	0	88
10	Wellyda Dos Santos	Brazil	28	18	30	3	79
11	Claudia Baró	Cuba	20	24	20	0	64
12	Jasmín Soto	Independent Athletes Team	18	28	16	0	62
13	Flor Espiritusanto	Dominican Republic	16	16	18	-40	10
