= 2021 UEC European Track Championships – Women's points race =

Women's points race at the 2021 UEC European Track Championships
- Venue: Tissot Velodrome, Grenchen
- Date: 8 October
- Competitors: 18 from 18 nations
- Winning points: 35

Medalists
gold medal	Gulnaz Khatuntseva	Russia
silver medal	Shari Bossuyt	Belgium
bronze medal	Lonneke Uneken	Netherlands

The women's points race competition at the 2021 UEC European Track Championships was held on 8 October 2021.

== Results ==
100 laps (25 km) were raced with 10 sprints.

Rank	Name	Nation	Lap points	Sprint points	Finish order	Total points
1st place, gold medalist(s)	Gulnaz Khatuntseva	Russia	20	15	3	35
2nd place, silver medalist(s)	Shari Bossuyt	Belgium	20	8	6	28
3rd place, bronze medalist(s)	Lonneke Uneken	Netherlands	20	2	9	22
4	Olivija Baleišytė	Lithuania	20	1	15	21
5	Silvia Zanardi	Italy	0	18	5	18
6	Valentine Fortin	France	0	15	4	15
7	Karolina Karasiewicz	Poland	0	14	2	14
8	Laura Süßemilch	Germany	0	10	1	10
9	Daniela Campos	Portugal	0	8	11	8
10	Neah Evans	Great Britain	0	6	10	6
11	Léna Mettraux	Switzerland	0	5	7	5
12	Jarmila Machačová	Czech Republic	0	1	14	1
13	Tereza Medveďová	Slovakia	0	0	12	0
14	Nastassia Kiptsikava	Belarus	–20	10	13	–10
15	Alice Sharpe	Ireland	–20	0	8	–20
16	Tania Calvo	Spain	–20	0	–	DNF
16	Tamara László	Hungary	–20	0	–	DNF
16	Viktoriia Yaroshenko	Ukraine	–20	8	–	DNF
