= Isabel Martín =

Spanish cyclist

Personal information
- Full name: Isabel Martín Martín
- Born: 1 May 1999 (age 27)

Cycling career
- Sport: Cycling
- Current team: Cantabria Deporte–Río Miera
- Discipline: Road
- Role: Rider

Professional teams
- 2019: Bizkaia–Durango
- 2020: Massi–Tactic
- 2021–: Río Miera–Cantabria Deporte

Isabel Martín Martín (Note: In this Spanish name, the first or paternal surname is Martín and the second or maternal family name is Martín.) (born 1 May 1999) is a Spanish professional racing cyclist, who currently rides for UCI Women's Continental Team Cantabria Deporte–Río Miera.

== Major results ==
2017
2nd Road race, National Junior Road Championships
2021
4th Time trial, National Road Championships
2023
3rd GP Cantabria Deporte-VII Trofeo Ciclismo Femenino Villa de Noja
