= Río Miera–Cantabria Deporte =

Spanish cycling team

Team information
- UCI code: RMC (2017–)
- Registered: Spain
- Founded: 2017
- Status: National team (2017–19); UCI Women's Continental Team (2020–)

Team name history
- 2017–: Río Miera–Cantabria Deporte

Río Miera–Cantabria Deporte is a Spanish women's road bicycle racing team, which participates in elite women's races. The team was established in 2017.

== Team roster ==
As of 26 January 2021.

Rider	Date of birth
Eva Anguela (ESP)	11 June 2002 (age 24)
Paula Díaz (ESP)	3 January 1997 (age 29)
Elisabet Escursell Valero (ESP)	30 October 1996 (age 29)
Carolina Esteban (ESP)	15 February 2001 (age 25)
Ania Horcajada (ESP)	23 February 2002 (age 24)
Alba Leonardo (ESP)	27 March 2002 (age 24)

Rider	Date of birth
Isabel Martín (ESP)	1 May 1999 (age 27)
Aida Nuño (ESP)	24 November 1983 (age 42)
Nerea Nuño (ESP)	12 July 1994 (age 32)
Fie Østerby (DNK)	10 May 1992 (age 34)
Susana Pérez (ESP)	15 November 2001 (age 24)
Laura Tenorio (ESP)	22 April 1998 (age 28)

== Major results ==
2021
Gijon II Cyclo-cross, Aida Nuño
Tarancon Cyclo-cross, Aida Nuño

2022
Memorial Jose Ignacio Urdaniz, Isabel Martín
GP Cantabria Deporte–Trofeo Villa de Noja, Alba Leonardo
Volta Femines la Safor, Susana Pérez
Trofeo Baja Andarx, Carolina Esteban
Trofeo Residencia Santa Ana de Abanilla, Susana Pérez
P Ajuntament de Picassent, Susana Pérez
Copa Fémines Ciutat de Carlet, Susana Pérez
GP Ciclista Femenino Fuenlabrada-El Bicho, Eva Anguela

== National Champions ==
2023
Puerto Rico Time Trial, Erialis Otero
