= 2024 UEC European Track Championships – Women's madison =

Women's madison at the 2024 UEC European Track Championships
- Venue: Omnisport Apeldoorn, Apeldoorn
- Date: 14 January
- Competitors: 26 from 13 nations
- Teams: 13
- Winning points: 50

Medalists
gold medal	Valentine Fortin; Marion Borras	France
silver medal	Katrijn De Clercq; Lotte Kopecky	Belgium
bronze medal	Elisa Balsamo; Vittoria Guazzini	Italy

The women's madison competition at the 2024 UEC European Track Championships was held on 14 January 2024.

== Results ==
120 laps (30 km) with 12 sprints were raced.

Rank	Name	Nation	Lap points	Sprint points	Finish order	Total points
1st place, gold medalist(s)	Valentine Fortin; Marion Borras	France	20	30	3	50
2nd place, silver medalist(s)	Katrijn De Clercq; Lotte Kopecky	Belgium	20	21	5	41
3rd place, bronze medalist(s)	Elisa Balsamo; Vittoria Guazzini	Italy	0	28	1	28
4	Daria Pikulik; Wiktoria Pikulik	Poland	0	24	2	24
5	Marit Raaijmakers; Lisa van Belle	Netherlands	0	18	4	18
6	Lara Gillespie; Alice Sharpe	Ireland	0	9	6	9
7	Franziska Brauße; Lea Lin Teutenberg	Germany	0	5	7	5
8	Ellen Klinge; Ida Krum	Denmark	0	0	8	0
9	Michelle Andres; Jasmin Liechti	Switzerland	0	0	9	0
10	Tetyana Klimchenko; Arina Korotieieva	Ukraine	–40	0	–	DNF
–	Elinor Barker; Neah Evans	Great Britain	0	5	–	DNF
–	Kateřina Kohoutková; Petra Ševčíková	Czech Republic	0	3	–	DNF
–	Isabel Ferreres; Laura Rodríguez	Spain	–20	0	–	DNF
