= Marie Le Net =

French cyclist (born 2000)

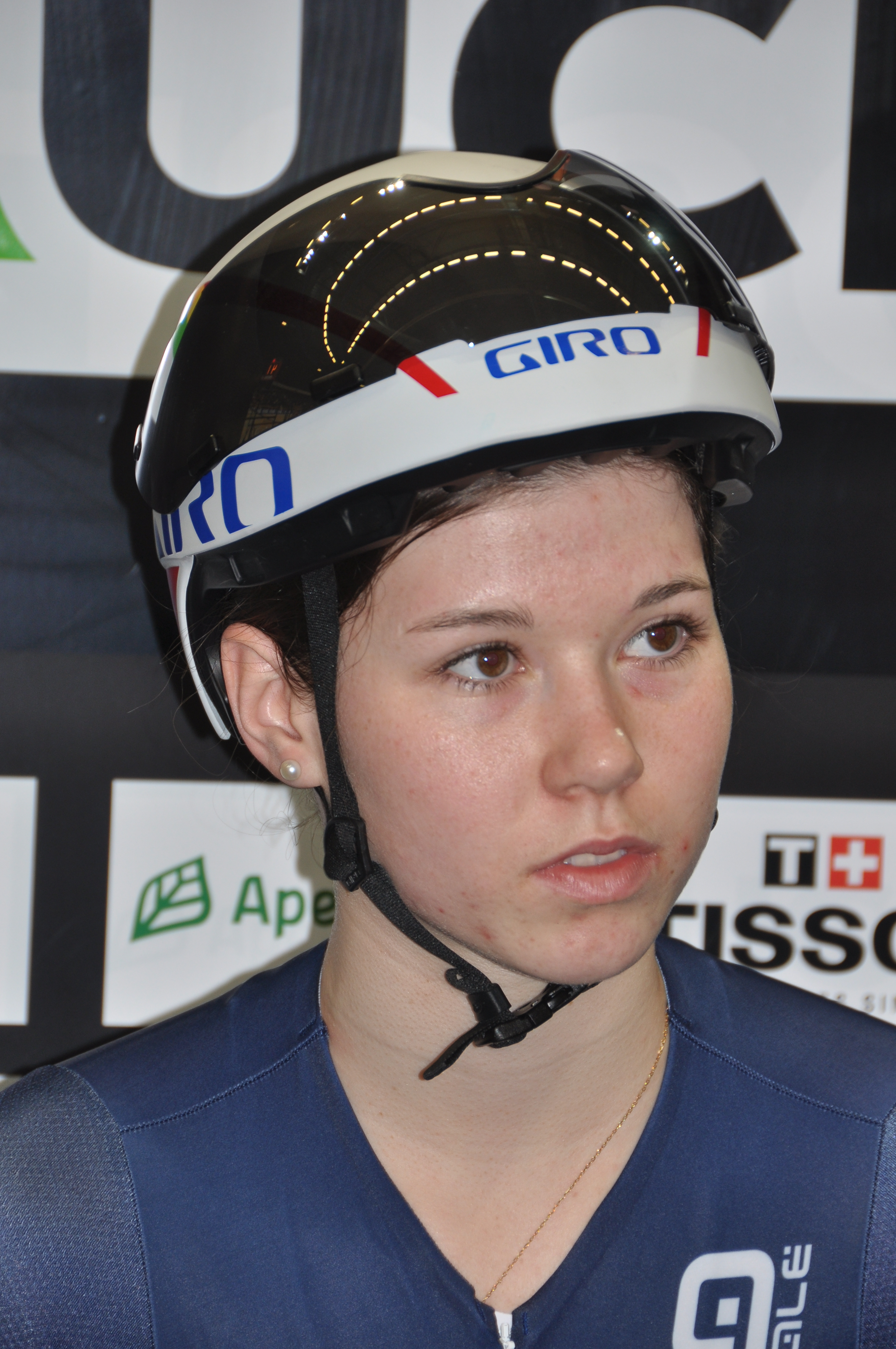
- Le Net in March 2018

Personal information
- Born: 25 January 2000 (age 26) Pontivy, France

Cycling career
- Sport: Cycling
- Current team: FDJ United–Suez
- Disciplines: Road; Track
- Role: Rider

Amateur team
- 2017–2018: Breizh Ladies

Professional team
- 2019–: FDJ Nouvelle-Aquitaine Futuroscope
Medal record
Women's track cycling
Representing France
World Championships
Silver medal – second place	2020 Berlin	Madison
Silver medal – second place	2021 Roubaix	Madison
Bronze medal – third place	2023 Glasgow	Team pursuit
European Championships
Bronze medal – third place	2023 Grenchen	Points race
Women's road bicycle racing
World Championships
Silver medal – second place	2018 Innsbruck	Junior road race
European Championships
Bronze medal – third place	2022 Anadia	Under-23 time trial

Marie Le Net (French: [maʁi lə nɛ]; born 25 January 2000) is a French road and track cyclist, who currently rides for UCI Women's WorldTeam FDJ United–Suez. Le Net won the silver medal in the junior women's road race at the 2018 UCI Road World Championships.

== Major results ==
=== Road ===
2017
1st Time trial, National Junior Championships
10th Overall Omloop van Borsele
2018
UCI World Junior Championships

2nd Road race
8th Time trial

European Junior Championships

4th Road race
4th Time trial

8th Overall Omloop van Borsele
2021
National Under-23 Championships

2nd Road race
3rd Time trial

5th La Périgord Ladies
6th Time trial, European Under-23 Championships
8h Overall Bretagne Ladies Tour
2022
1st La Picto–Charentaise
European Under-23 Championships

3rd Time trial
8th Road race

3rd Kreiz Breizh Elites Dames
4th Overall Bretagne Ladies Tour
4th La Périgord Ladies
Mediterranean Games

5th Time trial
6th Road race

7th Dwars door Vlaanderen
9th La Classique Morbihan
10th Chrono des Nations
Combativity award Stage 6 Tour de France
2023
National Championships

2nd Road race
4th Time trial

10th Chrono des Nations
2024
4th Overall Bretagne Ladies Tour
9th Paris–Roubaix Femmes
10th Grand Prix du Morbihan Féminin

2025
National Championships

1st Road race

=== Track ===
2019
2019–20 UCI World Cup

2nd Team pursuit, Milton
2nd Madison, Minsk
3rd Madison, Brisbane

2nd UEC European Under-23 Championships
2020
2nd Madison, UCI World Championships
2021
2nd Madison, UCI World Championships
2023
1st Team pursuit, Cairo, UCI Nations Cup
3rd Team pursuit, UCI World Championships
3rd Points race, European Championships
2024
3rd Team pursuit, Milton, UCI Nations Cup
