= Prudence Fowler =

New Zealand track cyclist (born 2003)

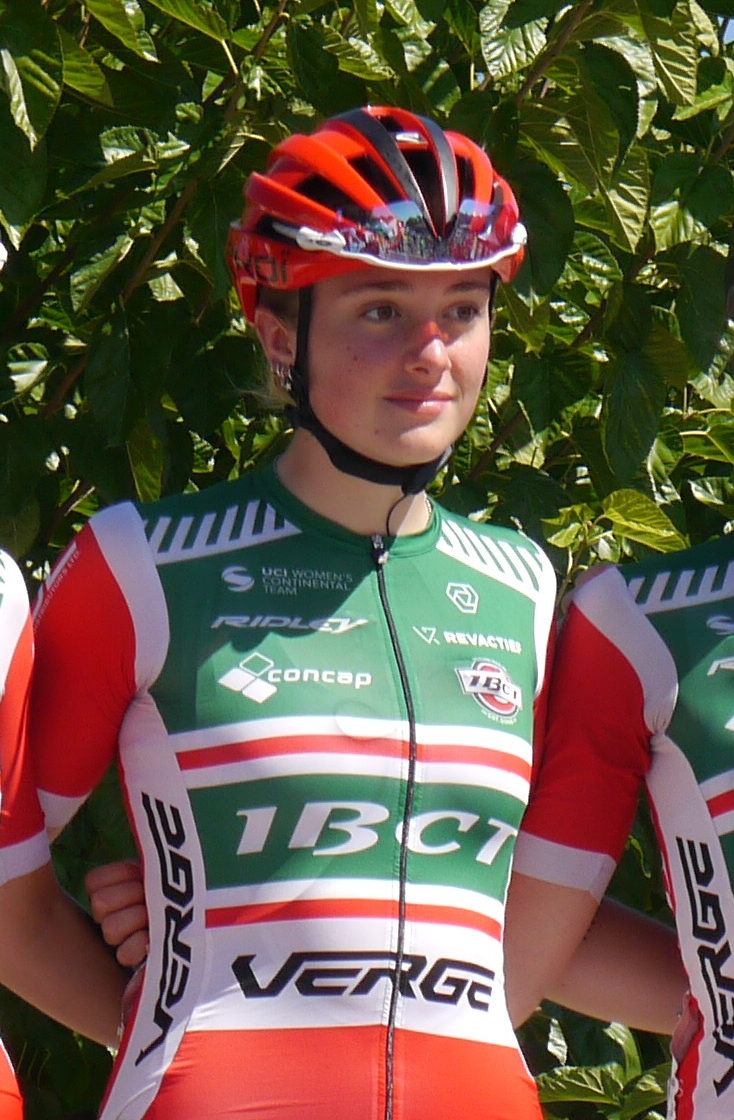
- Fowler in 2022

Personal information
- Born: 13 January 2003 (age 23)

Cycling career
- Sport: Cycling
- Discipline: Track
- Role: Rider
Medal record
Women's track cycling
Representing New Zealand
World Championships
Bronze medal – third place	2025 Santiago	Scratch
Commonwealth Games
Silver medal – second place	2026 Glasgow	Team pursuit

Prudence Fowler (born 13 January 2003) is a New Zealand track cyclist. She was a bronze medallist at the 2025 UCI Track Cycling World Championships in the women's scratch race.

== Early life ==
Fowler was born on 13 January 2003, the youngest of three children, and grew up in Auckland. Her father Jose competed in Ironman Triathlon events. She was educated at the Diocesan School for Girls and competed in swimming, triathlon and rowing events whilst growing up, before focusing on cycling. When she was 12 years old, Fowler had a plate inserted into her leg, having had operations to remove a benign tumour from the bottom of her left leg, which had eroded her bone.

== Career ==
By the age of 16, Fowler had won 24 New Zealand national titles across various age-group categories and cycling disciplines. In 2018 and 2019, she won the New Zealand U17 time trial and road race titles at the Age Group Road National Championships. She also had success on the track, as she finished second in the U17 individual pursuit and won the U17 points race.

Fowler was part of the New Zealand team pursuit quartet that won the silver medal at the 2025 UCI Track Cycling Nations Cup. In October 2025, Fowler won a bronze medal at the 2025 UCI Track Cycling World Championships in Santiago, Chile, in the women's scratch race, behind Lorena Wiebes of the Netherlands and Denmark's Amalie Dideriksen.

== Major results ==
2025
3rd Scratch, UCI Track World Championships
