= Maddie Leech =

English cyclist (born 2003)

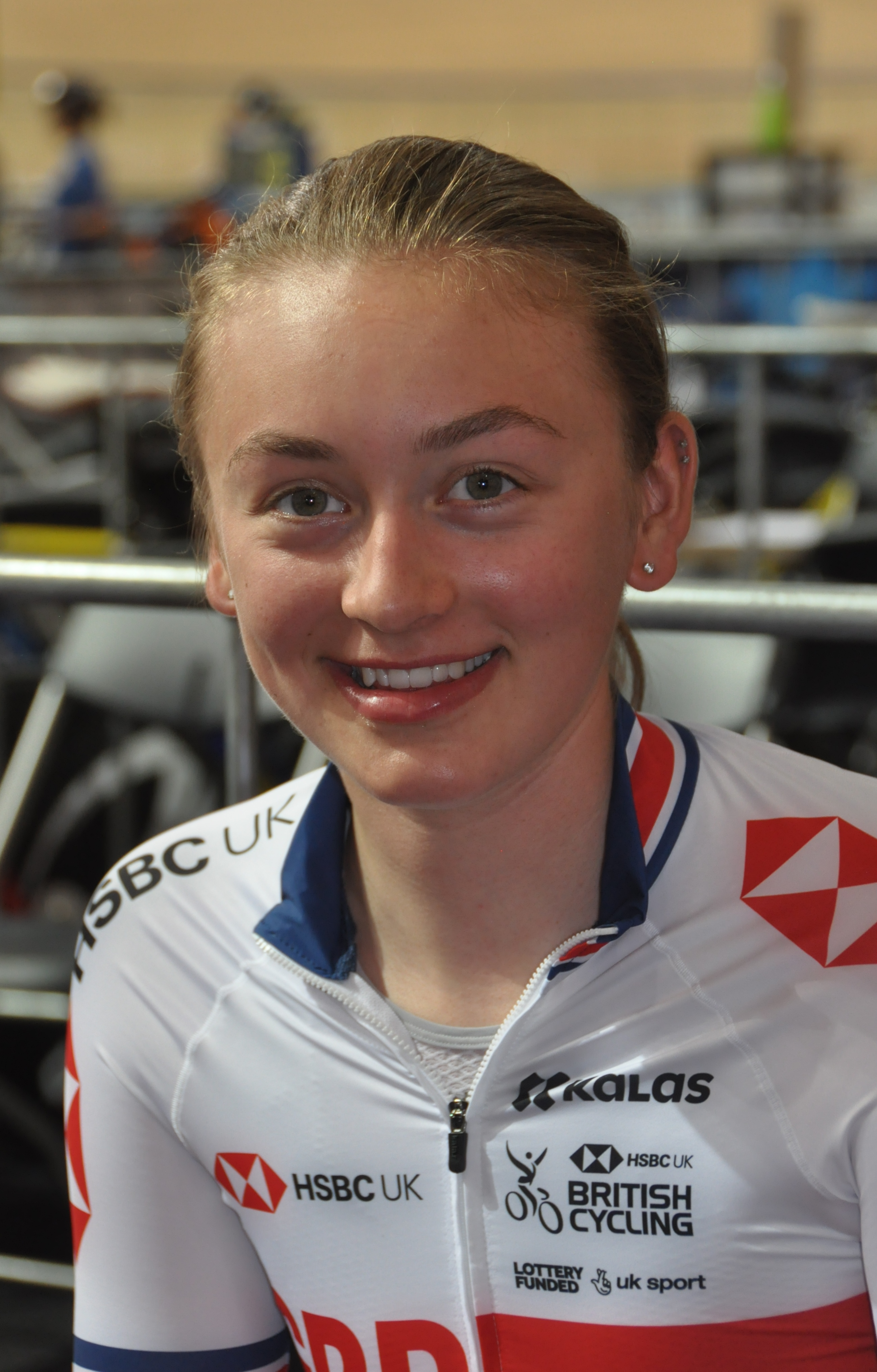
- Maddie Leech (2021)

Personal information
- Born: 4 May 2003 (age 23) Huddersfield, England

Cycling career
- Sport: Cycling
- Disciplines: Track, road
- Role: Rider

Professional teams
- 2022: CAMS–Basso
- 2023-2024: Lifeplus Wahoo
- 2025: Handsling Alba Development Road Team

Major wins
- Track World Championships Madison (2025)
Medal record
Women's track cycling
Representing Great Britain
World Championships
Gold medal – first place	2025 Santiago	Madison
Bronze medal – third place	2025 Santiago	Team pursuit
European Championships
Silver medal – second place	2025 Heusden-Zolder	Omnium
Bronze medal – third place	2025 Heusden-Zolder	Team pursuit
European Under-23 Championships
Gold medal – first place	2025 Anadia	Team pursuit
Silver medal – second place	2025 Anadia	Omnium
Representing England
Commonwealth Games
Bronze medal – third place	2022 Birmingham	Team pursuit

Madelaine Leech (born 4 May 2003) is an English international cyclist. In 2022, she represented England at the Commonwealth Games and won a bronze medal in the women's team pursuit. She was a two-time medalist at the 2025 UEC European Track Championships. She has ridden for UCI Women's Continental Team Lifeplus–Wahoo. and currently rides for UCI Women's Continental Team Alba Development Racing Team

== Biography ==
Leech rode for Huddersfield Star Wheelers before joining CAMS-Basso, she was part of winning teams in the European Junior Championship team pursuit and World Junior Championship road race. She won the silver medal in the Madison and a bronze medal in the Omnium at the 2022 British National Track Championships.

In 2022, she was selected for the 2022 Commonwealth Games in Birmingham. She competed in four events, winning a bronze medal in the women's team pursuit. She also rode in the points race, the women's individual pursuit event, finishing in 12th place and the women's road race.

In June 2023, she became British U23 time trial champion. She then competed on the track at the U23 European Track Championships in Portugal, winning the U23 Team Pursuit alongside Sophie Lewis, Grace Lister and Kate Richardson. She also won in the U23 wonen’s Madison with Sophie Lewis. Leech won her first senior national title at the 2023 British Cycling National Track Championships, after she won the Team Pursuit riding for Team Inspired. The following year, at the 2024 British Cycling National Track Championships, she repeated the achievement, winning a second team pursuit national title for Team Inspired.

She competed for Great Britain at the 2025 UEC European Track Championships in Belgium, where she won a silver medal in the women's omnium. She also finished in sixth place in the women’s Madison alongside Neah Evans, and won a bronze medal at the championships in the women's team pursuit.

Leech was part of the British team pursuit line-up that won bronze at the 2025 UCI Track Cycling World Championships. She then became a world champion in the madison, competing alongside teammate Katie Archibald.

At the 2026 Track Cycling World Cup in Hong Kong, Leech won a silver medal in the team pursuit, before winning another silver in the madison with Erin Boothman.

== Personal life ==
She is from Huddersfield in West Yorkshire.

== Major results ==
=== Road ===
2021
5th Time trial, UCI World Junior Championships
7th Overall Watersley Ladies Challenge
2023
1st Time trial, National Under-23 Championships
2024
2nd Time trial, National Under-23 Championships

=== Track ===
2021
1st Team pursuit, UEC European Junior Championships
2022
3rd Team pursuit, Commonwealth Games
2023
UEC European Under-23 Championships

1st Team pursuit
1st Madison (with Sophie Lewis)

1st Team pursuit, National Championships
2024
1st Team pursuit, National Championships
2025
UEC European Track Championships

3rd Team pursuit

UCI World Championships

1st Madison (with Katie Archibald)
3rd Team pursuit

2026
2026 UCI Track World Cup

2nd Team pursuit, Hong Kong
2nd Madison (with Erin Boothman), Hong Kong
