= Chiara Consonni =

Italian cyclist (born 1999)

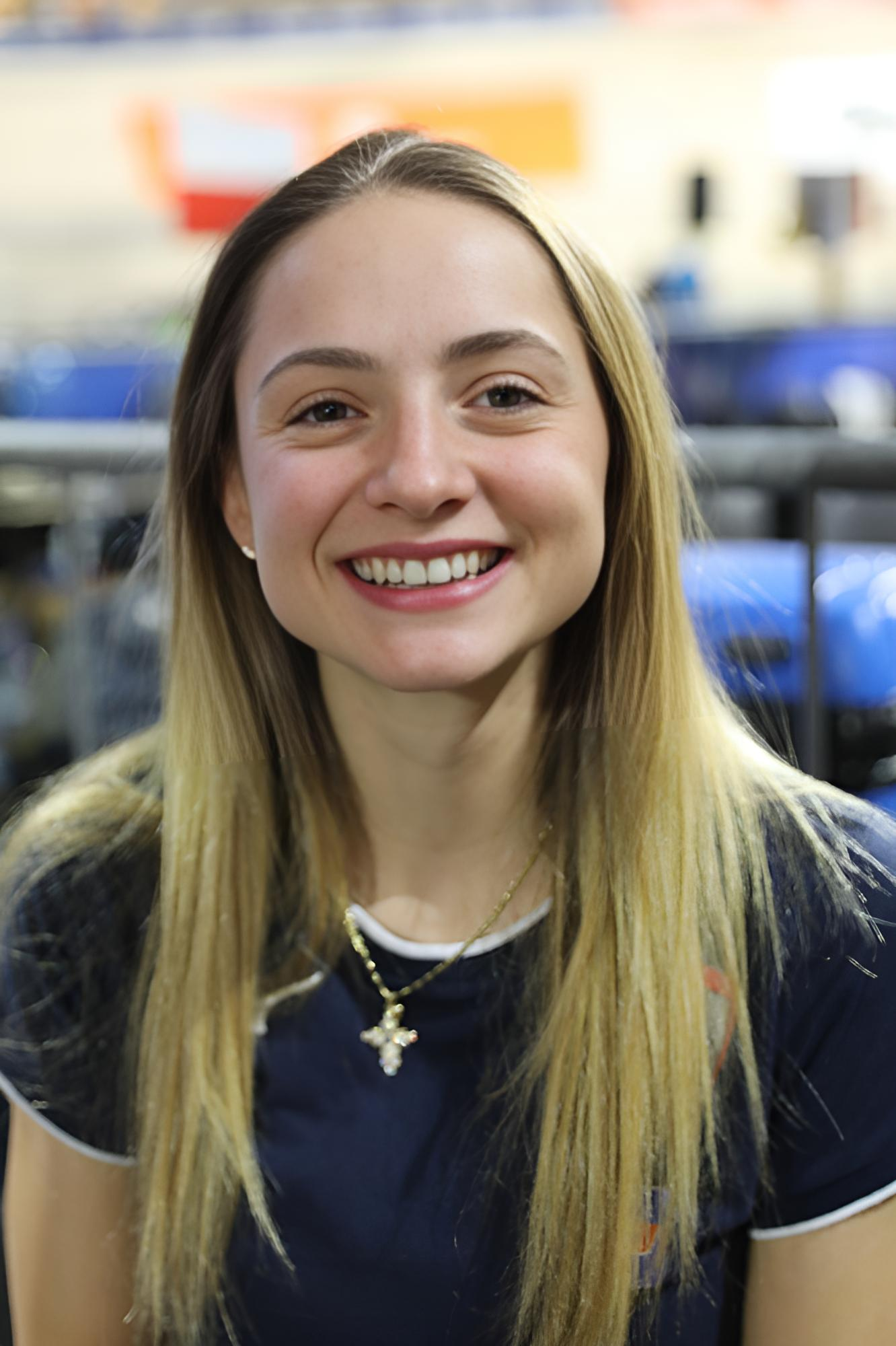
- Consonni in 2024

Personal information
- Born: 24 June 1999 (age 27) Ponte San Pietro, Lombardy, Italy
- Height: 1.65 m (5 ft 5 in)
- Weight: 59 kg (130 lb)

Cycling career
- Sport: Cycling
- Current team: Canyon//SRAM
- Disciplines: Road and track
- Role: Rider
- Rider type: Sprinter

Professional teams
- 2017–2022: Valcar–PBM
- 2023–2024: UAE Team ADQ
- 2025–: Canyon//SRAM Zondacrypto

Major wins
- Road Major Tours Giro d'Italia 3 individual stages (2022, 2023, 2024) One-day races and Classics Dwars door Vlaanderen (2022) Track Olympic Games Madison (2024) World Championships Team pursuit (2022, 2025)
Medal record
Women's track cycling
Representing Italy
Olympic Games
Gold medal – first place	2024 Paris	Madison
World Championships
Gold medal – first place	2022 Saint-Quentin-en-Yvelines	Team pursuit
Gold medal – first place	2025 Santiago	Team pursuit
Silver medal – second place	2021 Roubaix	Team pursuit
Silver medal – second place	2026 Shanghai	Team pursuit
Bronze medal – third place	2024 Ballerup	Team pursuit
Bronze medal – third place	2025 Santiago	Madison
European Championships
Gold medal – first place	2025 Heusden-Zolder	Team pursuit
Silver medal – second place	2020 Plovdiv	Team pursuit
Silver medal – second place	2025 Heusden-Zolder	Madison
Junior World Championships
Gold medal – first place	2016 Aigle	Team pursuit
Gold medal – first place	2017 Montichiari	Team pursuit
Gold medal – first place	2017 Montichiari	Madison
Bronze medal – third place	2017 Montichiari	Points race
U23 & Junior European Championships
Gold medal – first place	2016 Montichiari	Junior Team pursuit
Gold medal – first place	2017 Sangalhos	Junior Team pursuit
Gold medal – first place	2017 Sangalhos	Junior Madison
Gold medal – first place	2020 Fiorenzuola d'Arda	U23 Team pursuit
Gold medal – first place	2020 Fiorenzuola d'Arda	U23 Elimination
Gold medal – first place	2020 Fiorenzuola d'Arda	U23 Madison

Chiara Consonni (born 24 June 1999) is an Italian racing cyclist, who as of 2025 rides for UCI Women's World Team Canyon//SRAM. She rode for Valcar–PBM in the women's team time trial event at the 2018 UCI Road World Championships.

Her older brother, Simone Consonni, is also a professional cyclist.

== Major results ==
=== Road ===
2017
3rd Flanders Diamond Tour
7th Gent–Wevelgem Juniors
2018
1st Young rider classification, Tour of Norway
3rd Flanders Diamond Tour
7th Omloop van Borsele
8th Brabantse Pijl
2019
1st Stage 5 Boels Ladies Tour
3rd Gran Premio Bruno Beghelli
5th Tour of Guangxi
2020
2nd Grand Prix d'Isbergues
3rd GP de Plouay
2021
1st Ronde de Mouscron
1st Vuelta a la Comunitat Valenciana
1st Grand Prix de Plumelec-Morbihan
2nd Flanders Diamond Tour
3rd La Classique Morbihan
9th Ronde van Drenthe
2022
1st Dwars door Vlaanderen
1st Dwars door de Westhoek
1st Flanders Diamond Tour
1st Grand Prix d'Isbergues
1st Stage 9 Giro Donne
2nd Le Samyn
2nd Scheldeprijs
2nd Gran Premio della Liberazione
4th Nokere Koerse
4th Road race, National Championships
5th Overall RideLondon Classique
7th Ronde van Drenthe
7th Classic Brugge–De Panne
7th Drentse Acht van Westerveld
7th Ronde de Mouscron
2023
1st Overall Tour of Chongming Island

1st Stage 3

1st Trofee Maarten Wynants
1st Stage 9 Giro Donne
2nd Dwars door Vlaanderen
3rd Scheldeprijs
9th Paris–Roubaix
9th Classic Brugge–De Panne
2024
1st Stage 2 Giro d'Italia
1st Flanders Diamond Tour
1st GP Eco-Struct
1st Gran Premio della Liberazione
2nd Acht van Westerveld
2nd Konvert Koerse
3rd Gent–Wevelgem
4th Classic Brugge-De Panne
4th Egmont Cycling Race
7th Grand Prix International d'Isbergues
7th Dwars door Vlaanderen
2025
1st Overall Tour de Pologne

1st Stages 1 & 3

2nd Trofeo Marratxi-Felanitx
2nd Classic Brugge–De Panne
3rd Copenhagen Sprint
3rd Scheldeprijs
5th Gent–Wevelgem
10th Paris–Roubaix
2026
4th Tour of Bruges Women
5th Copenhagen Sprint
10th Milan–San Remo Women
1st Philaelphia Cycling Classic

=== Track ===
2016
1st Team pursuit, UCI World Junior Championships
1st Team pursuit, UEC European Junior Championships
2nd Team sprint, National Junior Championships
2017
UCI World Junior Championships

1st Team pursuit
1st Madison (with Letizia Paternoster)
3rd Points race

UEC European Junior Championships

1st Team pursuit
1st Madison (with Letizia Paternoster)

2018
National Championships

2nd Madison (with Marta Cavalli)
3rd Omnium

2019
UCI World Cup

3rd Team pursuit, Glasgow
3rd Madison, Hong Kong (with Vittoria Guazzini)

2020
UEC European Under-23 Championships

1st Team pursuit
1st Madison (with Martina Fidanza)

2022
1st Team pursuit, UCI World Championships
2024
1st Madison, Olympic Games (with Vittoria Guazzini)
2025
UCI World Championships

1st Team pursuit
3rd Madison (with Vittoria Guazzini)

== See also ==
- Italian sportswomen multiple medalists at Olympics and World Championships
