= Shari Bossuyt =

Belgian cyclist

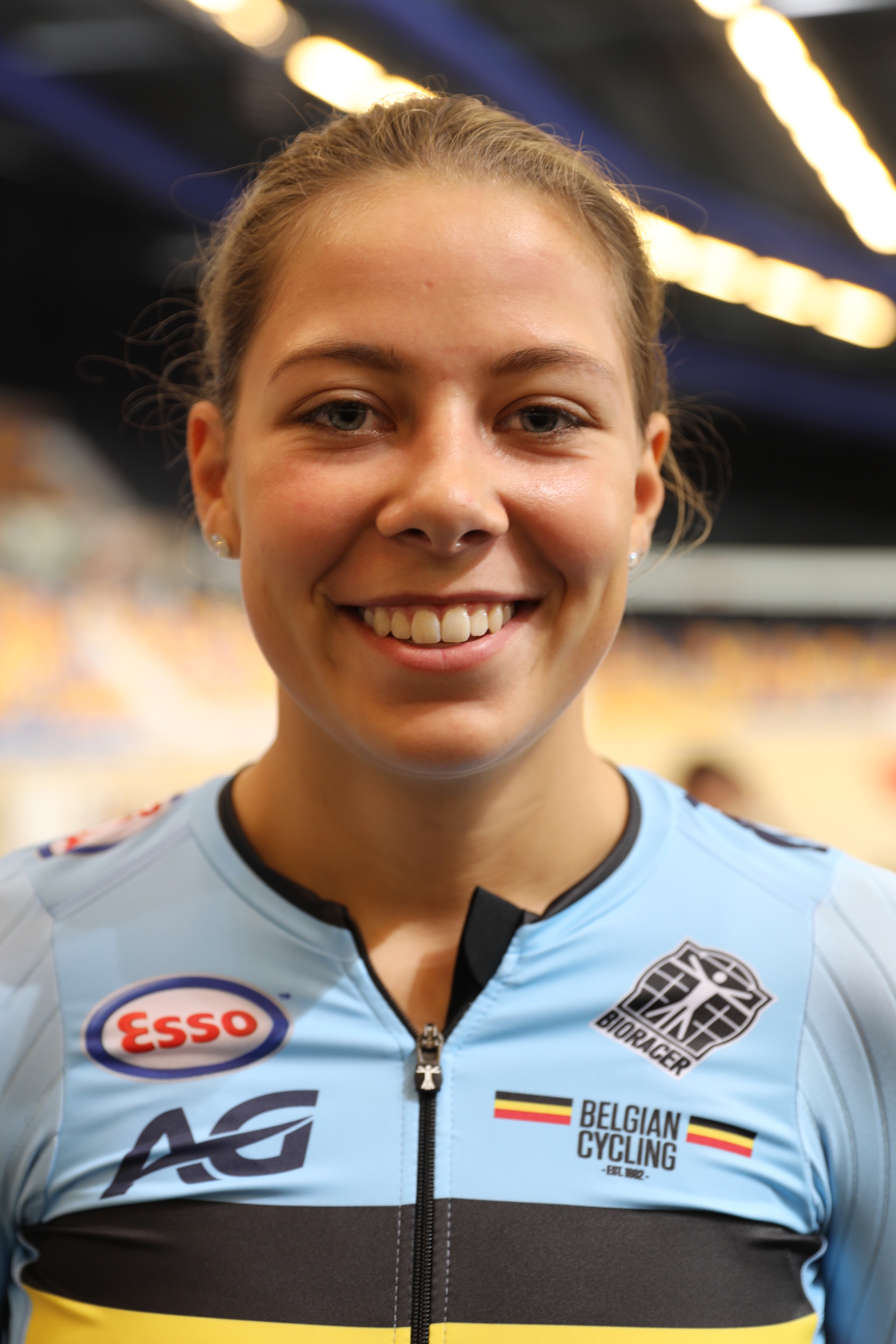
- Bossuyt in 2019

Personal information
- Full name: Shari Bossuyt
- Born: 5 September 2000 (age 26)

Cycling career
- Sport: Cycling
- Current team: AG Insurance–Soudal
- Disciplines: Road; Track
- Role: Rider

Amateur team
- 2019: Rogelli–Gyproc–APB

Professional teams
- 2020–2021: NXTG Racing
- 2022–2024: Canyon//SRAM
- 2025–: AG Insurance–Soudal

Major wins
- Major Tours La Vuelta Femenina 1 individual stage (2026) One-day races and Classics National Road Race Championships (2026)
Medal record
Women's track cycling
Representing Belgium
World Championships
Gold medal – first place	2022 Saint-Quentin-en-Yvelines	Madison
Bronze medal – third place	2026 Shanghai	Points race
European Championships
Gold medal – first place	2026 Konya	Madison
Silver medal – second place	2021 Grenchen	Points race
Silver medal – second place	2023 Grenchen	Points race
Bronze medal – third place	2026 Konya	Omnium

Shari Bossuyt (born 5 September 2000) is a Belgian professional racing cyclist, who rides for UCI Women's WorldTeam AG Insurance–Soudal. She rode in the women's team pursuit event at the 2019 UEC European Track Championships in Apeldoorn, Netherlands.

In March 2023, during the Tour de Normandie Féminin she tested positive for letrozole, after winning stage three. Despite the French Anti-Doping Agency acknowledged that the use was not intentional, she received a two-year suspension in January 2024. She returned to racing in June 2025, joining AG Insurance–Soudal.

She finished 4th in the Women's Omnium competition at the 2025 UCI Track Cycling World Championships on 24 October 2025, narrowly missing out on the bronze medal in the final sprint of the Points race.

== Major results ==
=== Road ===
2017
1st Time trial, National Junior Road Championships
2018
National Junior Road Championships

1st Time trial
1st Road race

EPZ Omloop van Borsele

1st Stage 2
1st Points classification

2021
1st Time trial, National Under-23 Road Championships
2nd Overall Watersley Women's Challenge

1st Stage 2 (ITT)

7nd Overall Belgium Tour
2022
2nd Time trial, National Road Championships
2nd Overall Belgium Tour

1st Youth classification

8th Dwars door Vlaanderen
9th Le Samyn
10th Overall Bloeizone Fryslân Tour

1st Young rider classification

10th Nokere Koerse
2023 (Voided results)
~~5th Classic Brugge–De Panne~~
~~6th Overall Tour de Normandie Féminin~~

~~1st Stage 3~~

~~10th Gent–Wevelgem~~
2025
1st Grand Prix de Wallonie
5th Road race, National Road Championships
2026
1st Road race, National Road Championships
1st Stage 2 La Vuelta Femenina
5th Tour of Bruges Women
7th Omloop Het Nieuwsblad

=== Track ===
2021
UEC European Championships

2nd Points race

2022
UCI World Championships

1st Madison (with Lotte Kopecky)

2023
UEC European Championships

2nd Points race

2025
UCI World Championships

4th Omnium

2026
UEC European Championships

1st Madison (with Lotte Kopecky)
3rd Omnium

UCI World Championships

3rd Points race
