= Yareli Acevedo =

Mexican cyclist (born 2001)

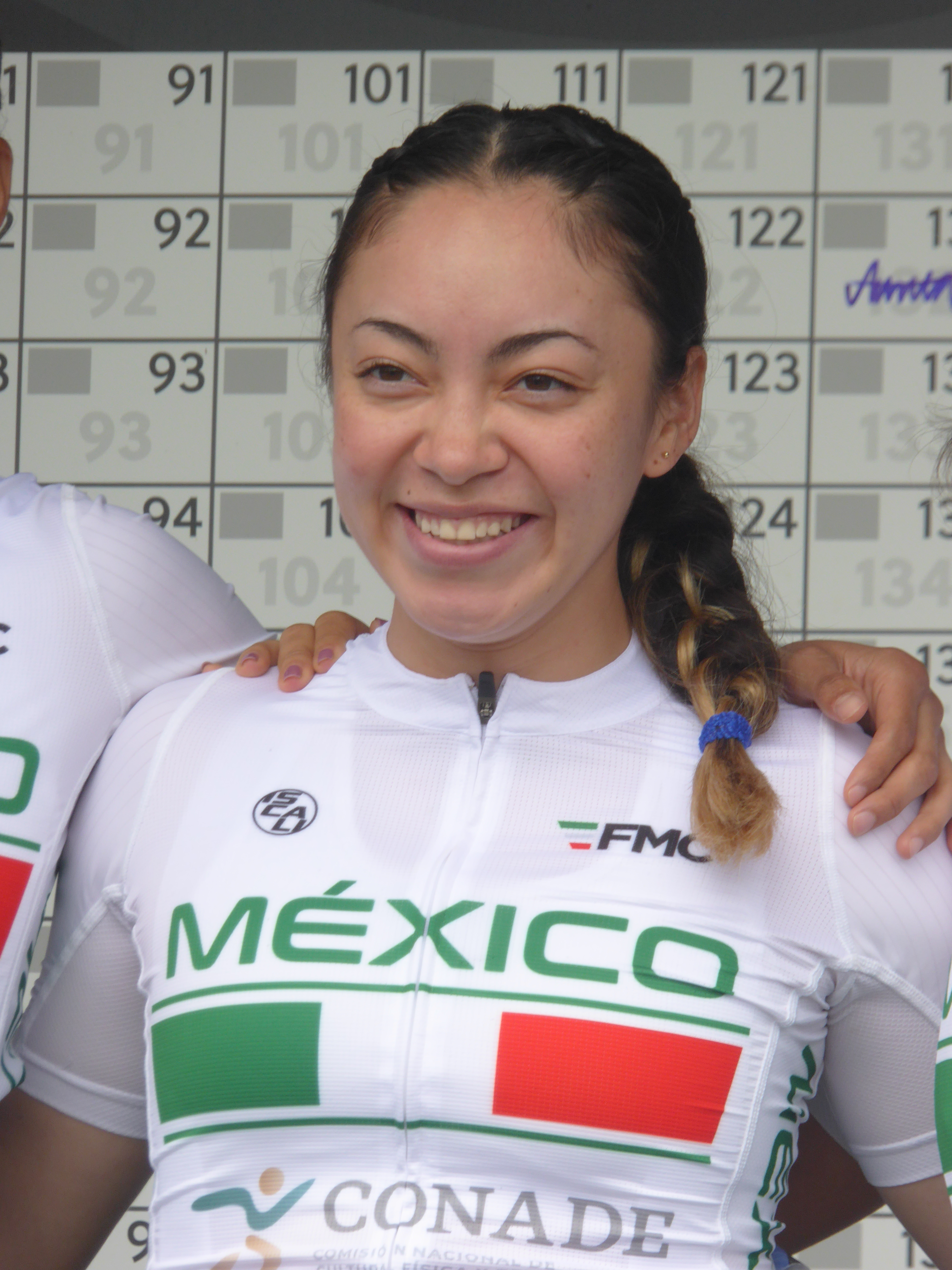
- Acevedo at the 2023 UCI Road World Championships

Personal information
- Full name: Yareli Acevedo Mendoza
- Born: 29 July 2001 (age 25)

Cycling career
- Sport: Cycling
- Current team: Pato Bike BMC Team
- Disciplines: Track; Road
- Role: Rider

Amateur team
- 2024–: Pato Bike BMC Team
Medal record
Representing Mexico
Women's track cycling
World Championships
Gold medal – first place	2025 Santiago	Points race
Pan American Games
Gold medal – first place	2023 Santiago	Omnium
Silver medal – second place	2023 Santiago	Team pursuit
Pan American Championships
Gold medal – first place	2021 Lima	Points race
Gold medal – first place	2021 Lima	Madison
Gold medal – first place	2023 San Juan	Elimination
Gold medal – first place	2023 San Juan	Points race
Gold medal – first place	2025 Asuncion	Elimination
Gold medal – first place	2025 Asuncion	Omnium
Gold medal – first place	2025 Asuncion	Scratch
Gold medal – first place	2026 Santiago	Elimination
Gold medal – first place	2026 Santiago	Omnium
Gold medal – first place	2026 Santiago	Madison
Silver medal – second place	2021 Lima	Individual pursuit
Silver medal – second place	2021 Lima	Team pursuit
Silver medal – second place	2022 Lima	Elimination race
Silver medal – second place	2022 Lima	Team pursuit
Silver medal – second place	2023 San Juan	Team pursuit
Silver medal – second place	2026 Santiago	Points race
Silver medal – second place	2026 Santiago	Team pursuit
Bronze medal – third place	2024 Carson	Omnium
Bronze medal – third place	2024 Carson	Elimination race
Bronze medal – third place	2024 Carson	Team pursuit
Central American and Caribbean Games
Gold medal – first place	2023 San Salvador	Team pursuit
Gold medal – first place	2026 Santo Domingo	Omnium
Silver medal – second place	2026 Santo Domingo	Madison
Silver medal – second place	2026 Santo Domingo	Team pursuit
World Junior Championships
Bronze medal – third place	2019 Frankfurt	Points race
Junior Pan American Games
Gold medal – first place	2021 Cali-Valle	Madison
Silver medal – second place	2021 Cali-Valle	Omnium
Silver medal – second place	2021 Cali-Valle	Team pursuit
Women's road cycling
Central American and Caribbean Games
Bronze medal – third place	2026 Santo Domingo	Road race
Junior Pan American Games
Gold medal – first place	2021 Cali-Valle	Road race
Silver medal – second place	2021 Cali-Valle	Time trial

Yareli Acevedo Mendoza (born 29 July 2001) is a Mexican track cyclist. She won the gold medal at the 2025 UCI Track Cycling World Championships in the points race. She was a gold medalist at the 2023 Pan American Games in the omnium, and is a multiple-time gold medalist at the Pan American Track Championships.

== Career ==
At the 2021 Junior Pan American Games, Acevedo won five medals, including three gold medals. In June 2021, Acevedo won the madison with Victoria Velasco at the Pan American Track Championships in Lima, Peru. She also won the points race at the championships. Acevedo represented Mexico at the 2021 UCI Track Cycling World Championships. She and Velasco were set to compete at the 2021 Olympic Games but had to withdraw following a registration error by the Mexican federation.

Acevedo was a gold medalist at the 2023 Pan American Games in the omnium, and a silver medalist in the team pursuit alongside Velasco, Antonieta Gaxiola and Lizbeth Salazar. At the 2023 Pan American Track Cycling Championships, Acevedo won gold medals in the points race and the elimination race.

In March 2025, she won the elimination race at the 2025 UCI Track Cycling Nations Cup in Konya, Turkey, ahead of Lisa Van Belle of the Netherlands. The following month, Acevedo won gold medals in the scratch race, elimination race, and omnium events at the 2025 Pan American Track Cycling Championships in Asunción, Paraguay.

Acevedo won the gold medal at the 2025 UCI Track Cycling World Championships in the points race in Santiago, Chile, in October 2025.

== Personal life ==
Acevedo was educated at School of Accounting and Administration, UNAM in Mexico City.

== Major results ==
=== Track ===
2021
UCI Nations Cup

1st Elimination race, Cali

2022
UCI Nations Cup

3rd Elimination race, Cali

2024
UCI Champions League

1st Elimination race, London II
2nd Elimination race, Paris
2nd Elimination race, Apeldoorn II

UCI Nations Cup

3rd Elimination race, Hong Kong

2025
1st Points race, UCI Track World Championships
1st Elimination race, UCI Nations Cup

=== Road ===
2018
2nd Road race, Pan American Junior Championships
2020
2nd Time trial, National Under-23 Championships
2021
1st Time trial, National Under-23 Championships
Junior Pan American Games

1st Road race
2nd Time trial
