= Federica Venturelli =

Italian cyclist (born 2005)

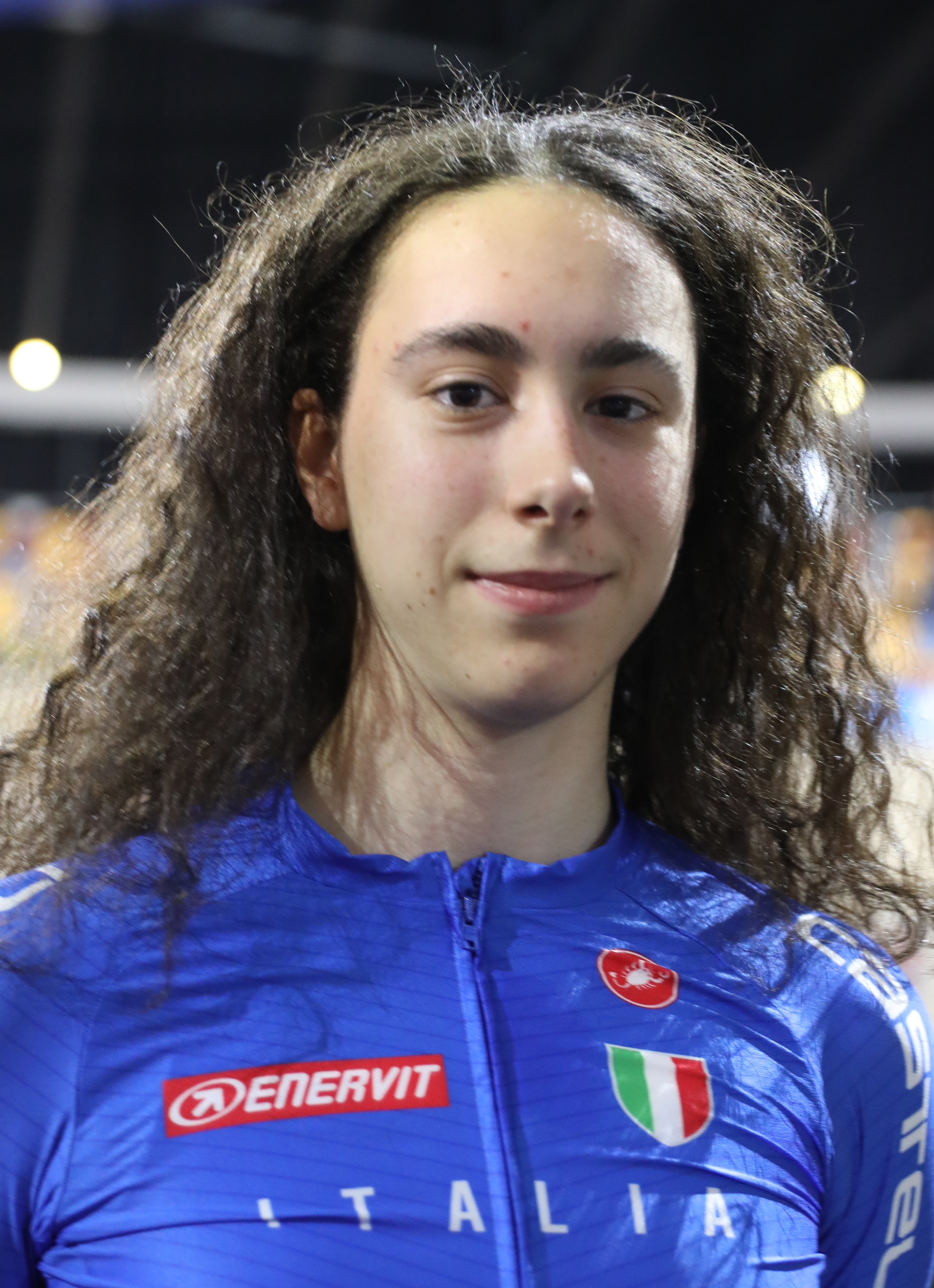
- Venturelli in 2024

Personal information
- Born: 12 January 2005 (age 21) Cremona, Italy

Cycling career
- Sport: Cycling
- Current team: UAE Team L'Imad
- Disciplines: Track; Road; Cyclo-cross

Amateur team
- 2023: Valcar–Travel & Service U19

Professional teams
- 2024–2025: UAE Development Team
- 2026–: UAE Team ADQ

Major wins
- Track World Championships Team pursuit (2025)
Medal record
Representing Italy
Women's road bicycle racing
World Championships
Bronze medal – third place	2023 Glasgow	Junior time trial
Bronze medal – third place	2025 Kigali	Under-23 time trial
European Championships
Gold medal – first place	2023 Drenthe	Junior time trial
Gold medal – first place	2023 Drenthe	Junior team relay
Gold medal – first place	2025 Guilherand-Granges	Under-23 time trial
Silver medal – second place	2023 Drenthe	Junior road race
Silver medal – second place	2025 Guilherand-Granges	Mixed team relay
Bronze medal – third place	2022 Anadia	Junior road race
Women's track cycling
World Championships
Gold medal – first place	2025 Santiago	Team pursuit
European Championships
Silver medal – second place	2026 Konya	Individual pursuit
Bronze medal – third place	2026 Konya	Team pursuit
Bronze medal – third place	2026 Konya	Madison
European Under-23 Championships
Gold medal – first place	2025 Anadia	Individual pursuit
World Junior Championships
Gold medal – first place	2022 Tel Aviv	Individual pursuit
Gold medal – first place	2023 Cali	Individual pursuit
Gold medal – first place	2023 Cali	Madison
Silver medal – second place	2022 Tel Aviv	Team pursuit
Silver medal – second place	2023 Cali	Team pursuit

Federica Venturelli (born 12 January 2005) is an Italian cyclist, who currently rides for UCI Women's WorldTeam UAE Team L'Imad.

== Major results ==
=== Cyclo-cross ===
2021–2022
UCI Junior World Cup

3rd Tábor

5th UCI World Junior Championships
2022–2023
1st Junior Pontevedra
2nd Turin
2nd Junior Val Fontanabuona
2nd Junior Xaxancx
3rd National Junior Championships
4th UCI World Junior Championships

=== Road ===
2022
National Junior Championships

1st Time trial
2nd Road race

UEC European Junior Championships

3rd Road race
4th Time trial

8th Piccolo Trofeo Alfredo Binda
2023
UEC European Junior Championships

1st Time trial
1st Team relay
2nd Road race

National Junior Championships

1st Road race
1st Time trial

1st Overall Tour du Gévaudan Occitanie

1st Mountains classification
1st Stage 1

1st Overall Watersley Ladies Challenge

1st Stages 1 & 2

2nd Overall Omloop van Borsele
2nd Tour of Flanders Juniors
UCI World Junior Championships

3rd Time trial
4th Road race

2024
2nd Overall Giro Mediterraneo Rosa

1st Points classification
1st Young rider classification
1st Stages 4 & 5

2nd Cyclis Classic
4th Gran Premio della Liberazione
9th Antwerp Port Epic
9th Trofee Maarten Wynants
9th Omloop der Kempen
2025
3rd Time trial, UCI World Under-23 Championships
2026
1st Clásica de Almería
1st Dwars door de Westhoek

=== Track ===
2022
UCI World Junior Championships

1st Individual pursuit
2nd Team pursuit

UEC European Junior Championships

1st Individual pursuit
1st Omnium
1st Team pursuit

2023
UCI World Junior Championships

1st Individual pursuit
1st Madison (with Vittoria Grassi)
2nd Team pursuit

UEC European Junior Championships

1st Individual pursuit
1st Team pursuit

2024
UEC European Under-23 Championships

1st Individual pursuit
3rd Omnium
3rd Team pursuit

2025
1st Team pursuit, UCI World Championships
