= Eva Anguela =

Spanish cyclist (born 2002)

- Anguela in 2021

Personal information
- Full name: Eva Anguela Yagüez
- Born: 11 June 2002 (age 24) Galapagar, Spain

Cycling career
- Sport: Cycling
- Current team: Cantabria Deporte–Río Miera
- Discipline: Road
- Role: Rider

Professional teams
- 2021–2022: Río Miera–Cantabria Deporte
- 2023: Zaaf Cycling Team
- 2024: Primeau Vélo - Groupe Abadie
- 2025-: Cantabria Deporte–Río Miera
Medal record
Women's track cycling
Representing Spain
European U23 Championships
Silver medal – second place	2024 Cottbus	Elimination race
Bronze medal – third place	2023 Anadia	Madison

Eva Anguela Yagüez (born 11 June 2002) is a Spanish professional racing cyclist, who currently rides for UCI Women's Continental Team Cantabria Deporte–Río Miera.

== Career ==
In September 2020, Anguela won the Spanish national junior road title. The following year, she rode for Río Miera–Cantabria Deporte and participated in her first World Tour race at the 2021 Challenge by La Vuelta.

For the 2023 season, she was recruited by a new continental team, the Zaaf Cycling Team, however with the riders unpaid the UCI revoked the team licence in the spring of 2023. Transitioning to the track, she was a bronze medalist alongside Isabella Escalera at the 2023 U23 UEC European Track Championships in Portugal in the Madison.

In 2024, she joined the French continental team Primeau Vélo - Groupe Abadie. That year, she won the silver medal in the elimination race at the 2024 U23 UEC European Track Championships in Cottbus, Germany, as well as having a seventh place finish in the omnium.

Having returned to Cantabria Deporte–Río Miera, in 2025 she won the Copa España féminas. She represented Spain at the 2025 UCI Track Cycling World Championships in Santiago, Chile.

Anguela (left) having placed second at La Classique Morbihan in 2026

Anguela represented Spain at the 2026 UEC European Track Championships in Konya, Turkey, in February 2026. In May 2026 she placed second at La Classique Morbihan behind Abi Miller of Great Britain.

== Personal life ==
From Galapagar, Madrid, her younger brother, Mario, is also a competetive cyclist, with both siblings representing Spain at the 2023 European Under-23 Track Cycling Championship.
