= Katrijn De Clercq =

Belgian cyclist (born 2002)

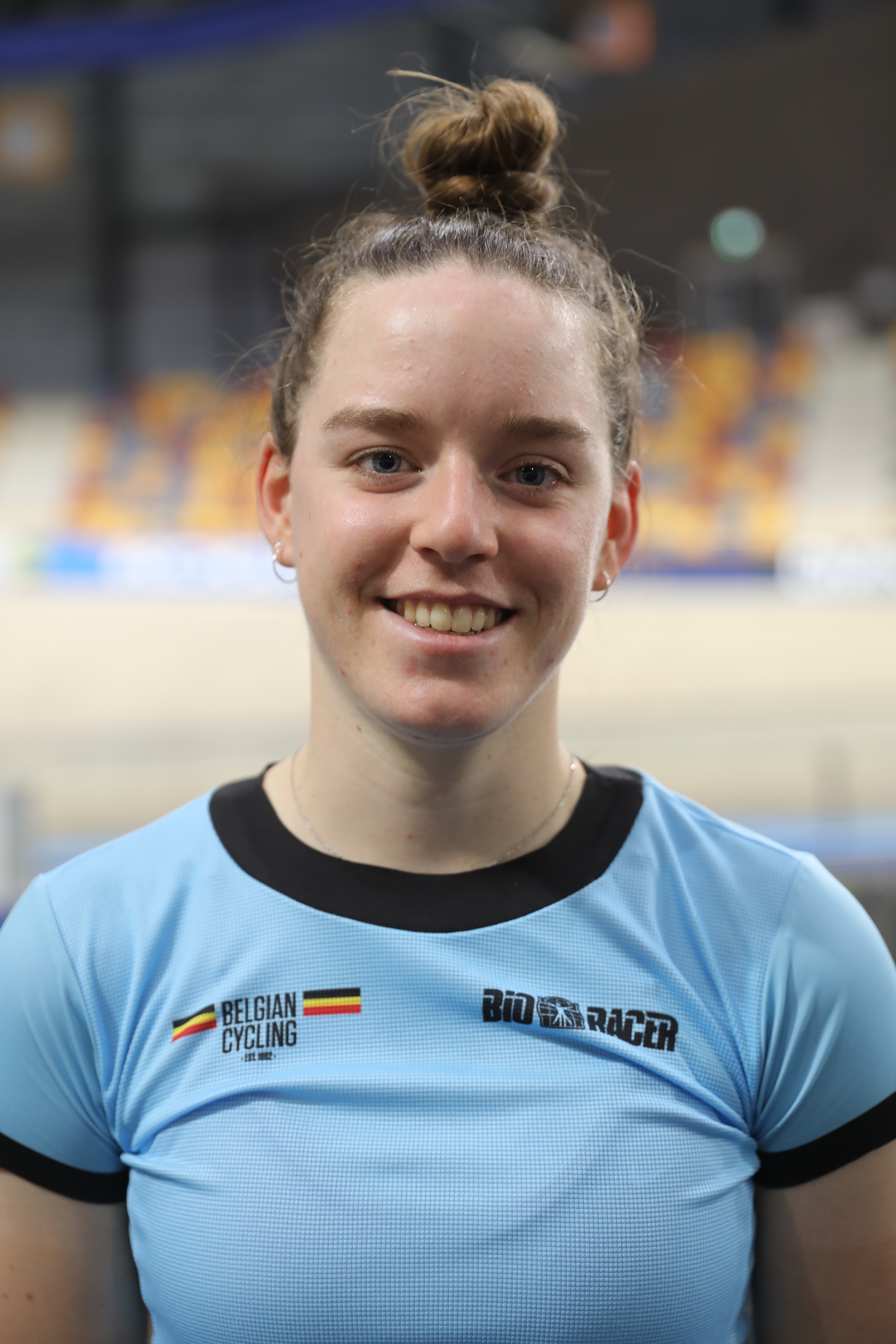
- De Clercq in 2024

Personal information
- Born: 5 February 2002 (age 24) Oosterzele, Belgium

Cycling career
- Sport: Cycling
- Current team: Lotto–Intermarché Ladies
- Disciplines: Road; Track
- Role: Rider

Professional team
- 2022–: Lotto–Soudal Ladies
Medal record
Women's track cycling
Representing Germany
European Championships
Gold medal – first place	2021 Grenchen	Team pursuit
Silver medal – second place	2024 Apeldoorn	Madison

Katrijn De Clercq (born 5 February 2002) is a Belgian professional racing cyclist, who currently rides for UCI Women's Continental Team Lotto–Intermarché Ladies. She won a silver medal in the Madison at the 2024 UEC European Track Championships with Lotte Kopecky.
