= Isabella Escalera =

Spanish cyclist (born 2003)

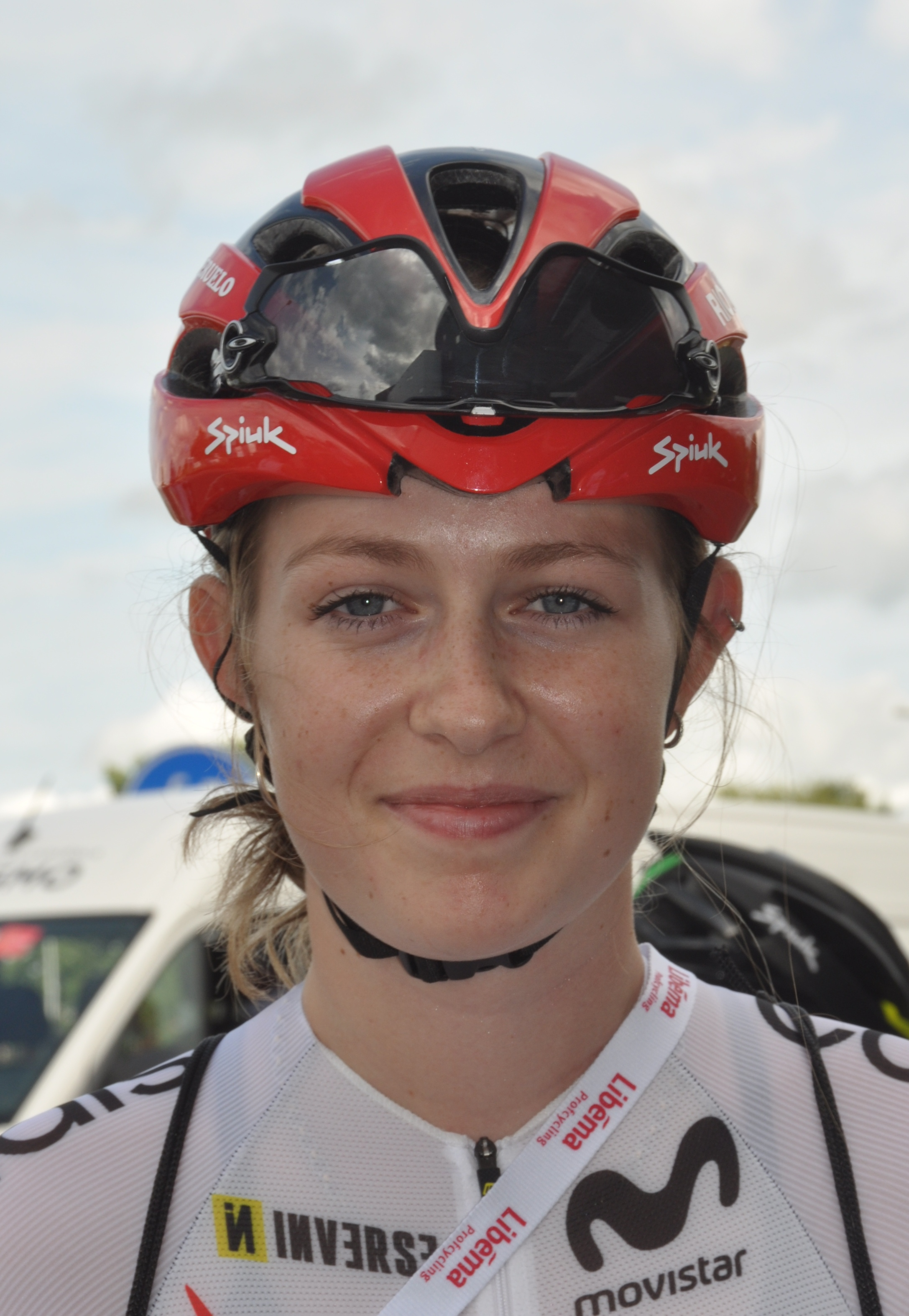
- Escalera in 2021

Personal information
- Full name: Isabella Maria Escalera Layton
- Born: 1 July 2003 (age 23) London, England

Cycling career
- Sport: Cycling
- Current team: Torelli
- Disciplines: Track; Road
- Role: Rider

Amateur team
- 2021: Rio Mera–Meruelo

Professional team
- 2022–2023: Eneicat–RBH Global–Martín Villa
- 2024–: Torelli
Medal record
Women's track cycling
Representing Spain
U23 & Junior European Championships
Silver medal – second place	2025 Anadia	Elimination race
Bronze medal – third place	2023 Anadia	Madison

Isabella Maria Escalera Layton (born 1 July 2003) is a Spanish road and track cyclist who rides for Torelli. At the 2023 UCI Track Cycling World Championships she set a new Spanish national record in the Women's individual pursuit.

== Early life ==
Raised in Britain with British mother and a Spanish father, Escalera partook in ballet and swimming as a youngster before being inspired to start cycling after watching the 2012 London Olympics. She competed as a junior in Britain, winning the U12 National Youth Circuit Championship in July 2015, before making the decision to race for Spain in 2021.

== Career ==
=== 2021 ===
In April 2021, she won the track cycling League event at the Miguel Indurain Velodrome in Tafalla, making her debut in the colours of the Cantabrian team Rio Mera-Meruelo. In August 2021, she won five medals at the Spanish National Track Championships, winning silver medals in the pursuit and sprint and three gold medals, in the 500 meters, team sprint and elimination race. The following month she participated in the 2021 UCI Junior Track Cycling World Championships in Cairo and finished sixth in the elimination race, eighth in the womwn's pursuit, tenth in the Madison and thirteenth in the Omnium. She later signed for the Eneicat–RBH Global–Martín Villa team.

=== 2022 ===
She selected for the senior Spanish team at the 2022 UCI Track Cycling Nations Cup in Glasgow in April 2022. She took part in the women's team pursuit at the 2022 UCI Track Cycling World Championships in France, where her Spanish team set a new national record time. She signed for the Soltec Team in November 2022.

=== 2023 ===
She was a bronze medalist alongside Eva Anguela at the 2023 U23 UEC European Track Championships in Portugal in the Madison. She competed in the women's pursuit and women's team pursuit at the 2023 UCI Track Cycling World Championships in Glasgow. She set a new Spanish record in the individual pursuit event with a time of 3:38.286. The previous record was held by Leire Olaberria who had previously also ridden faster but not according to the new regulations.

=== 2024 ===
She competed in the women's pursuit at the 2024 UEC European Track Championships in Apeldoorn. She finished third in the Madison alongside Eva Anguela at the Spanish National Championships in Dos Hermanas in February 2024.

=== 2025 ===
She was a silver medalist in the elimination race at the 2025 European U23 Track Championships in Portugal in July 2025.
