= 2021 UCI Track Cycling World Championships – Women's team pursuit =

Women's team pursuit at the 2021 UCI Track Cycling World Championships
- Venue: Vélodrome Couvert Régional Jean Stablinski
- Location: Roubaix, France
- Dates: 20–21 October
- Competitors: 40 from 9 nations
- Teams: 9
- Winning time: 4:08.752

Medalists
gold medal	Franziska Brauße; Lisa Brennauer; Mieke Kröger; Laura Süßemilch	Germany
silver medal	Elisa Balsamo; Martina Alzini; Chiara Consonni; Martina Fidanza	Italy
bronze medal	Katie Archibald; Megan Barker; Neah Evans; Josie Knight	Great Britain

The Women's team pursuit competition at the 2021 UCI Track Cycling World Championships was held on 20 and 21 October 2021.

== Results ==
=== Qualifying ===
The qualifying was started on 20 October at 13:00. The eight fastest teams advanced to the first round.

Rank	Nation	Time	Behind	Notes
1	Germany; Franziska Brauße; Lisa Brennauer; Mieke Kröger; Laura Süßemilch	4:13.082		Q
2	Italy; Elisa Balsamo; Letizia Paternoster; Martina Alzini; Martina Fidanza	4:14.176	+1.094	Q
3	Great Britain; Katie Archibald; Megan Barker; Neah Evans; Josie Knight	4:16.200	+3.118	Q
4	Ireland; Mia Griffin; Emily Kay; Kelly Murphy; Alice Sharpe	4:23.095	+10.013	Q
5	Canada; Ngaire Barraclough; Sarah Van Dam; Erin Attwell; Maggie Coles-Lyster	4:23.988	+10.906	q
6	Belarus; Hanna Tserakh; Aksana Salauyeva; Nastassia Kiptsikava; Taisa Naskovich	4:29.158	+16.076	q
7	Poland; Nikol Płosaj; Karolina Karasiewicz; Patrycja Lorkowska; Wiktoria Pikulik	4:29.445	+16.363	q
8	Switzerland; Aline Seitz; Michelle Andres; Fabienne Buri; Cybèle Schneider	4:34.370	+21.288	q
9	Nigeria; Tawakalt Yekeen; Grace Ayuba; Mary Samuel; Ese Ukpeseraye	5:33.212	+1:20.130	

=== First round ===
First round heats were held as follows:
Heat 1: 6th v 7th fastest
Heat 2: 5th v 8th fastest
Heat 3: 2nd v 3rd fastest
Heat 4: 1st v 4th fastest

The first round was started on 21 October at 18:30. The winners of heats three and four advanced to the gold medal race. The remaining six teams were ranked on time, from which the top two proceeded to the bronze medal race.

Heat	Rank	Nation	Time	Behind	Notes
1	1	Poland; Nikol Płosaj; Karolina Karasiewicz; Daria Pikulik; Wiktoria Pikulik	4:22.669		
1	2	Belarus; Hanna Tserakh; Aksana Salauyeva; Nastassia Kiptsikava; Taisa Naskovich	4.26.952	+4.283	
2	1	Canada; Ngaire Barraclough; Sarah Van Dam; Maggie Coles-Lyster; Devaney Collier	4:20.191		QB
2	2	Switzerland; Aline Seitz; Michelle Andres; Fabienne Buri; Léna Mettraux	4:29.068	+8.877	
3	1	Italy; Elisa Balsamo; Martina Alzini; Chiara Consonni; Martina Fidanza	4:11.497		QG
3	2	Great Britain; Katie Archibald; Megan Barker; Neah Evans; Josie Knight	4:14.413	+2.916	QB
4	1	Germany; Franziska Brauße; Lisa Brennauer; Mieke Kröger; Laura Süßemilch			QG
4	2	Ireland; Mia Griffin; Emily Kay; Kelly Murphy; Alice Sharpe	4:21.126		

- QG = qualified for gold medal final
- QB = qualified for bronze medal final

=== Finals ===
The finals were started on 21 October at 20:45.

Rank	Nation	Time	Behind	Notes
Gold medal race
1st place, gold medalist(s)	Germany; Franziska Brauße; Lisa Brennauer; Mieke Kröger; Laura Süßemilch	4:08.752		
2nd place, silver medalist(s)	Italy; Elisa Balsamo; Martina Alzini; Chiara Consonni; Martina Fidanza	4:13.690	+4.938	
Bronze medal race
3rd place, bronze medalist(s)	United Kingdom; Katie Archibald; Megan Barker; Neah Evans; Josie Knight	4:17.459		
4	Canada; Ngaire Barraclough; Erin Attwell; Maggie Coles-Lyster; Devaney Collier	4:22.889	+5.430	
