= 2024 UEC European Track Championships – Women's team pursuit =

Women's team pursuit at the 2024 UEC European Track Championships
- Venue: Omnisport Apeldoorn, Apeldoorn
- Date: 10–11 January
- Competitors: 42 from 9 nations
- Winning time: 4:12.551

Medalists
gold medal	Elisa Balsamo; Martina Fidanza; Vittoria Guazzini; Letizia Paternoster	Italy
silver medal	Megan Barker; Josie Knight; Anna Morris; Jessica Roberts; Neah Evans	Great Britain
bronze medal	Franziska Brauße; Lisa Klein; Lena Charlotte Reißner; Laura Süßemilch; Mieke Kröger	Germany

The women's team pursuit competition at the 2024 UEC European Track Championships was held on 10 and 11 January 2024.

== Results ==
=== Qualifying ===
The eight fastest teams advanced to the first round.

Rank	Nation	Time	Behind	Notes
1	Italy; Elisa Balsamo; Martina Fidanza; Vittoria Guazzini; Letizia Paternoster	4:15.180		Q
2	Germany; Franziska Brauße; Lisa Klein; Mieke Kröger; Laura Süßemilch	4:17.106	+1.926	Q
3	Great Britain; Megan Barker; Neah Evans; Josie Knight; Anna Morris	4:17.113	+1.933	Q
4	France; Victoire Berteau; Marion Borras; Clara Copponi; Valentine Fortin	4:18.475	+3.295	Q
5	Ireland; Erin Creighton; Lara Gillespie; Kelly Murphy; Alice Sharpe	4:23.807	+8.627	q
6	Poland; Patrycja Lorkowska; Wiktoria Pikulik; Nikol Płosaj; Olga Wankiewicz	4:27.239	+12.059	q
7	Belgium; Katrijn De Clercq; Febe Jooris; Sara Maes; Marith Vanhove	4:30.225	+15.045	q
8	Switzerland; Michelle Andres; Jasmin Liechti; Annika Liehner; Janice Stettler	4:32.186	+17.006	q
9	Spain; Isabel Ferreres; Marina Garau; Ziortza Isasi; Laura Rodríguez	4:34.916	+19.736	

=== First round ===
First round heats were held as follows:
Heat 1: 6th v 7th fastest
Heat 2: 5th v 8th fastest
Heat 3: 2nd v 3rd fastest
Heat 4: 1st v 4th fastest

The winners of heats 3 and 4 proceeded to the gold medal race. The remaining six teams were ranked on time, from which the top two proceeded to the bronze medal race.

Heat	Rank	Nation	Time	Notes
1	1	Belgium; Katrijn De Clercq; Febe Jooris; Lotte Kopecky; Marith Vanhove	4:21.281	
1	2	Poland; Patrycja Lorkowska; Daria Pikulik; Nikol Płosaj; Olga Wankiewicz	4:23.760	
2	1	Ireland; Lara Gillespie; Mia Griffin; Kelly Murphy; Alice Sharpe	4:20.881	QB
2	2	Switzerland; Michelle Andres; Jasmin Liechti; Annika Liehner; Janice Stettler	DSQ	
3	1	Great Britain; Megan Barker; Josie Knight; Anna Morris; Jessica Roberts	4:12.866	QG
3	2	Germany; Franziska Brauße; Lisa Klein; Mieke Kröger; Laura Süßemilch	4:14.326	QB
4	1	Italy; Elisa Balsamo; Martina Fidanza; Vittoria Guazzini; Letizia Paternoster		QG
4	2	France; Marion Borras; Clara Copponi; Valentine Fortin; Lara Lallemant	4:29.069	

=== Finals ===
Rank	Nation	Time	Behind	Notes
Gold medal final
1st place, gold medalist(s)	Italy; Elisa Balsamo; Martina Fidanza; Vittoria Guazzini; Letizia Paternoster	4:12.551		
2nd place, silver medalist(s)	Great Britain; Megan Barker; Josie Knight; Anna Morris; Jessica Roberts	4:15.950	+3.399	
Bronze medal final
3rd place, bronze medalist(s)	Germany; Franziska Brauße; Lisa Klein; Lena Charlotte Reißner; Laura Süßemilch	4:14.768		
4	Ireland; Lara Gillespie; Mia Griffin; Kelly Murphy; Alice Sharpe	4:21.539	+6.771	
