= 2023 UEC European Track Championships – Women's team pursuit =

Women's team pursuit at the 2023 UEC European Track Championships
- Venue: Tissot Velodrome, Grenchen
- Dates: 8–9 February
- Competitors: 36 from 8 nations
- Winning time: 4:13.890

Medalists
gold medal	Katie Archibald; Neah Evans; Josie Knight; Anna Morris; Elinor Barker	Great Britain
silver medal	Martina Alzini; Elisa Balsamo; Martina Fidanza; Vittoria Guazzini; Letizia Paternoster	Italy
bronze medal	Franziska Brauße; Lisa Klein; Mieke Kröger; Laura Süßemilch	Germany

The women's team pursuit competition at the 2023 UEC European Track Championships was held on 8 and 9 February 2023.

== Results ==
=== Qualifying ===
All teams advanced to the first round.

Rank	Nation	Time	Behind	Notes
1	Great Britain; Katie Archibald; Neah Evans; Josie Knight; Anna Morris	4:11.594		Q
2	Italy; Elisa Balsamo; Martina Fidanza; Vittoria Guazzini; Letizia Paternoster	4:14.227	+2.633	Q
3	France; Victoire Berteau; Marion Borras; Valentine Fortin; Marie Le Net	4:16.139	+4.555	Q
4	Germany; Franziska Brauße; Lisa Klein; Mieke Kröger; Laura Süßemilch	4:16.942	+5.348	Q
5	Ireland; Lara Gillespie; Mia Griffin; Kelly Murphy; Alice Sharpe	4:21.426	+9.832	q
6	Switzerland; Fabienne Buri; Jasmin Liechti; Marlen Reusser; Aline Seitz	4:21.783	+10.189	q
7	Spain; Tania Calvo; Isabel Ferreres; Eukene Larrarte; Laura Rodríguez	4:28.054	+16.460	q
8	Poland; Karolina Karasiewicz; Wiktoria Pikulik; Nikol Płosaj; Olga Wankiewicz	4:28.661	+17.067	q

=== First round ===
First round heats were held as follows:
Heat 1: 6th v 7th fastest
Heat 2: 5th v 8th fastest
Heat 3: 2nd v 3rd fastest
Heat 4: 1st v 4th fastest

The winners of heats 3 and 4 proceeded to the gold medal race. The remaining six teams were ranked on time, from which the top two proceeded to the bronze medal race.

Heat	Rank	Nation	Time	Notes
1	1	Switzerland; Fabienne Buri; Jasmin Liechti; Marlen Reusser; Aline Seitz	4:21.751	
1	2	Spain; Tania Calvo; Isabel Ferreres; Eukene Larrarte; Laura Rodríguez	4:26.621	
2	1	Ireland; Lara Gillespie; Mia Griffin; Kelly Murphy; Alice Sharpe	4:19.705	
2	2	Poland; Karolina Karasiewicz; Daria Pikulik; Wiktoria Pikulik; Olga Wankiewicz	4:23.884	
3	1	Italy; Elisa Balsamo; Martina Fidanza; Vittoria Guazzini; Letizia Paternoster	4:13.191	QG
3	2	France; Victoire Berteau; Marion Borras; Clara Copponi; Valentine Fortin	4:13.954	QB
4	1	Great Britain; Katie Archibald; Elinor Barker; Neah Evans; Josie Knight	4:11.079	QG
4	2	Germany; Franziska Brauße; Lisa Klein; Mieke Kröger; Laura Süßemilch	4:15.129	QB

=== Finals ===
Rank	Nation	Time	Behind	Notes
Gold medal final
1st place, gold medalist(s)	Great Britain; Katie Archibald; Neah Evans; Josie Knight; Anna Morris	4:13.890		
2nd place, silver medalist(s)	Italy; Martina Alzini; Elisa Balsamo; Martina Fidanza; Vittoria Guazzini	4:16.018	+2.128	
Bronze medal final
3rd place, bronze medalist(s)	Germany; Franziska Brauße; Lisa Klein; Mieke Kröger; Laura Süßemilch	4:14.402		
4	France; Victoire Berteau; Marion Borras; Clara Copponi; Valentine Fortin	4:15.557	+1.155	
