= 2022 UCI Track Cycling World Championships – Women's team pursuit =

Women's team pursuit at the 2022 UCI Track Cycling World Championships
- Venue: Vélodrome National
- Location: Saint-Quentin-en-Yvelines, France
- Dates: 12–13 October
- Competitors: 68 from 16 nations
- Teams: 16
- Winning time: 4:09.760

Medalists
gold medal	Elisa Balsamo; Chiara Consonni; Martina Fidanza; Vittoria Guazzini; Martina Alzini	Italy
silver medal	Neah Evans; Katie Archibald; Anna Morris; Josie Knight; Megan Barker	Great Britain
bronze medal	Marion Borras; Clara Copponi; Valentine Fortin; Victoire Berteau	France

The Women's team pursuit competition at the 2022 UCI Track Cycling World Championships was held on 12 and 13 October 2022.

== Results ==
=== Qualifying ===
The qualifying was started on 12 October at 13:30. The eight fastest teams advanced to the first round, the first four to the gold medal semi-finals, teams five to eight to minor semi-finals.

Rank	Nation	Time	Behind	Notes
1	Italy; Elisa Balsamo; Chiara Consonni; Martina Fidanza; Vittoria Guazzini	4:11.011		Q
2	Great Britain; Neah Evans; Katie Archibald; Megan Barker; Josie Knight	4:13.177	+2.166	Q
3	France; Marion Borras; Clara Copponi; Valentine Fortin; Victoire Berteau	4:13.425	+2.414	Q
4	Australia; Chloe Moran; Georgia Baker; Alexandra Manly; Maeve Plouffe	4:15.173	+4.162	Q
5	Germany; Lena Reißner; Lea Lin Teutenberg; Franziska Brauße; Mieke Kröger	4:16.898	+5.887	Q
6	Netherlands; Daniek Hengeveld; Maike van der Duin; Mylène de Zoete; Marit Raaijmakers	4:17.770	+6.759	Q
7	Canada; Maggie Coles-Lyster; Sarah Van Dam; Erin Attwell; Ruby West	4:18.877	+7.866	Q
8	United States; Jennifer Valente; Lily Williams; Colleen Gulick; Megan Jastrab	4:19.119	+8.108	Q
9	Ireland; Emily Kay; Alice Sharpe; Lara Gillespie; Kelly Murphy	4:19.934	+8.923	
10	China; Huang Zhilin; Wang Susu; Wang Xiaoyue; Zhang Hongjie	4:22.027	+11.016	
11	Poland; Karolina Karasiewicz; Daria Pikulik; Karolina Kumięga; Wiktoria Pikulik	4:23.952	+12.941	
12	Spain; Tania Calvo; Eukene Larrarte; Isabella Escalera; Ziortza Isasi	4:35.662	+24.651	
13	Mexico; Victoria Velasco; Yareli Acevedo; Jessica Bonilla; María Gaxiola	4:36.934	+25.923	
14	Hong Kong; Lee Sze Wing; Leung Bo Yee; Leung Wing Yee; Pang Yao	4:40.911	+29.900	
15	Uzbekistan; Sofiya Karimova; Nafosat Kozieva; Yanina Kuskova; Margarita Misyurina	4:42.432	+31.421	
16	Nigeria; Tawakalt Yekeen; Treasure Coxson; Tombrapa Grikpa; Mary Samuel	5:24.549	+1:13.538	

=== First round ===
The first round was started at 18:30.

First round heats were held as follows:
Heat 1: 6th v 7th fastest
Heat 2: 5th v 8th fastest
Heat 3: 2nd v 3rd fastest
Heat 4: 1st v 4th fastest

The winners of heats three and four advanced to the gold medal race. The remaining six teams were ranked on time, from which the top two proceeded to the bronze medal race.

Heat	Rank	Nation	Time	Behind	Notes
1	1	Netherlands; Daniek Hengeveld; Maike van der Duin; Mylène de Zoete; Marit Raaijmakers	4:14.869		
1	2	Canada; Maggie Coles-Lyster; Sarah Van Dam; Erin Attwell; Ruby West	4:15.835	+0.966	
2	1	Germany; Lena Reißner; Franziska Brauße; Lana Eberle; Mieke Kröger	4:15.017		
2	2	United States; Lily Williams; Colleen Gulick; Megan Jastrab; Shayna Powless	4:21.460	+6.359	
3	1	Great Britain; Neah Evans; Katie Archibald; Josie Knight; Anna Morris	4:10.109		QG
3	2	France; Marion Borras; Clara Copponi; Valentine Fortin; Victoire Berteau	4:11.329	+1.220	QB
4	1	Italy; Elisa Balsamo; Martina Alzini; Chiara Consonni; Vittoria Guazzini	4:11.562		QG
4	2	Australia; Chloe Moran; Georgia Baker; Alexandra Manly; Maeve Plouffe	4:13.929	+2.367	QB

- QG = qualified for gold medal final
- QB = qualified for bronze medal final

=== Finals ===
The finals were started on 13 October at 21:12.

Rank	Nation	Time	Behind	Notes
Gold medal race
1st place, gold medalist(s)	Italy; Elisa Balsamo; Chiara Consonni; Martina Fidanza; Vittoria Guazzini	4:09.760		
2nd place, silver medalist(s)	Great Britain; Neah Evans; Katie Archibald; Anna Morris; Josie Knight	4:11.369	+1.609	
Bronze medal race
3rd place, bronze medalist(s)	France; Marion Borras; Clara Copponi; Valentine Fortin; Victoire Berteau	4:10.774		
4	Australia; Chloe Moran; Georgia Baker; Alexandra Manly; Maeve Plouffe	4:13.866	+3.092	
