= 2021 UEC European Track Championships – Women's team pursuit =

European Track Championships

Women's team pursuit at the 2021 UEC European Track Championships
- Venue: Tissot Velodrome, Grenchen
- Date: 5–6 October
- Competitors: 40 from 9 nations
- Winning time: 4:13.489

Medalists
gold medal	Franziska Brauße; Lisa Brennauer; Mieke Kröger; Laura Süßemilch; Lena Charlotte Reißner	Germany
silver medal	Martina Alzini; Rachele Barbieri; Martina Fidanza; Silvia Zanardi; Letizia Paternoster	Italy
bronze medal	Mia Griffin; Emily Kay; Kelly Murphy; Alice Sharpe	Ireland

The women's team pursuit competition at the 2021 UEC European Track Championships was held on 5 and 6 October 2021.

== Results ==
=== Qualifying ===
The eight fastest teams advanced to the first round.

Rank	Nation	Time	Behind	Notes
1	Germany; Franziska Brauße; Mieke Kröger; Laura Süßemilch; Lena Charlotte Reißner	4:18.655		Q
2	Italy; Martina Alzini; Rachele Barbieri; Martina Fidanza; Letizia Paternoster	4:18.911	+0.256	Q
3	Ireland; Mia Griffin; Emily Kay; Kelly Murphy; Alice Sharpe	4:21.983	+3.328	Q
4	Netherlands; Mylène de Zoete; Daniek Hengeveld; Marit Raaijmakers; Lonneke Uneken	4:24.309	+5.654	Q
5	Great Britain; Megan Barker; Ella Barnwell; Eluned King; Madelaine Leech	4:24.562	+5.907	q
6	Poland; Karolina Karasiewicz; Karolina Kumięga; Wiktoria Pikulik; Nikol Płosaj	4:25.248	+6.593	q
7	Russia; Inna Abaidullina; Alena Ivanchenko; Maria Novolodskaya; Valeria Valgonen	4:26.003	+7.348	q
8	Belarus; Nastassia Kiptsikava; Taisa Naskovich; Aksana Salauyeva; Hanna Tserakh	4:30.278	+11.623	q
9	Switzerland; Michelle Andres; Fabienne Buri; Léna Mettraux; Cybèle Schneider	4:32.737	+14.802	

=== First round ===
First round heats were held as follows:
Heat 1: 6th v 7th fastest
Heat 2: 5th v 8th fastest
Heat 3: 2nd v 3rd fastest
Heat 4: 1st v 4th fastest

The winners of heats 3 and 4 proceeded to the gold medal race. The remaining six teams were ranked on time, from which the top two proceeded to the bronze medal race.

Heat	Rank	Nation	Time	Notes
1	1	Russia; Inna Abaidullina; Alena Ivanchenko; Maria Novolodskaya; Valeria Valgonen	4:22.427	
1	2	Poland; Karolina Karasiewicz; Karolina Kumięga; Wiktoria Pikulik; Nikola Wielowska	4:27.492	
2	1	Great Britain; Megan Barker; Ella Barnwell; Madelaine Leech; Sophie Lewis	4:22.048	QB
2		Belarus; Nastassia Kiptsikava; Taisa Naskovich; Aksana Salauyeva; Hanna Tserakh	DSQ	
3	1	Italy; Rachele Barbieri; Martina Fidanza; Letizia Paternoster; Silvia Zanardi	4:17.863	QG
3	2	Ireland; Mia Griffin; Emily Kay; Kelly Murphy; Alice Sharpe	4:21.202	QB
4	1	Germany; Franziska Brauße; Lisa Brennauer; Mieke Kröger; Laura Süßemilch		QG
4	2	Netherlands; Mylène de Zoete; Daniek Hengeveld; Marit Raaijmakers; Lonneke Uneken	4:24.199	

=== Finals ===
Rank	Nation	Time	Behind	Notes
Gold medal final
1st place, gold medalist(s)	Germany; Franziska Brauße; Lisa Brennauer; Mieke Kröger; Laura Süßemilch	4:13.489		
2nd place, silver medalist(s)	Italy; Martina Alzini; Rachele Barbieri; Martina Fidanza; Silvia Zanardi	4:20.923	+7.434	
Bronze medal final
3rd place, bronze medalist(s)	Ireland; Mia Griffin; Emily Kay; Kelly Murphy; Alice Sharpe	4:21.264		
4	Great Britain; Megan Barker; Ella Barnwell; Eluned King; Madelaine Leech	4:24.904	+3.640	
