= 2026 UCI Track Cycling World Championships – Women's team pursuit =

Women's team pursuit at the 2026 UCI Track Cycling World Championships
- Venue: Shanghai Velodrome
- Location: Shanghai, China
- Dates: 14–15 October
- Competitors: 70 from 17 nations
- Teams: 17
- Winning time: 4:04.610

Medalists
gold medal	Erin Boothman; Anna Morris; Millie Couzens; Josie Knight; Megan Barker	Great Britain
silver medal	Chiara Consonni; Elisa Balsamo; Martina Fidanza; Vittoria Guazzini; Martina Alzini	Italy
bronze medal	Messane Bräutigam; Franziska Brauße; Lisa Klein; Mieke Kröger	Germany

The women's team pursuit competition at the 2026 UCI Track Cycling World Championships was held on 14 and 15 October 2026.

== Results ==
=== Qualifying ===
The qualifying was started on 14 October at 10:30. The eight fastest teams advanced to the first round.

Rank	Nation	Time	Behind	Notes
1	Great Britain; Erin Boothman; Anna Morris; Millie Couzens; Josie Knight	4:08.055		Q
2	Germany; Messane Bräutigam; Franziska Brauße; Lisa Klein; Mieke Kröger	4:09.978	+1.923	Q
3	Italy; Elisa Balsamo; Martina Alzini; Martina Fidanza; Vittoria Guazzini	4:10.275	+2.220	Q
4	Netherlands; Nienke Veenhoven; Lorena Wiebes; Lisa van Belle; Sofie van Rooijen	4:13.843	+5.788	Q
5	Australia; Alyssa Polites; Sophie Edwards; Claudia Marcks; Felicity Wilson-Haffenden	4:14.368	+6.313	Q
6	China; Gong Xianbing; Chen Ning; Wei Suwan; Wang Xiaoyue	4:14.569	+6.514	Q
7	New Zealand; Samantha Donnelly; Bryony Botha; Prudence Fowler; Emily Shearman	4:15.084	+7.029	Q
8	France; Clara Copponi; Valentine Fortin; Victoire Berteau; Marion Borras	4:15.510	+7.455	Q
9	United States; Stephanie Lawrence; Emma Jimenez Palos; Kristen Faulkner; Bethany Ingram	4:18.810	+10.755	
10	Belgium; Katrijn De Clercq; Shari Bossuyt; Hélène Hesters; Luca Vierstraete	4:19.012	+10.957	
11	Japan; Mizuki Ikeda; Yumi Kajihara; Tsuyaka Uchino; Maho Kakita	4:19.093	+11.038	
12	Belarus; Alina Karotkina; Polina Konrad; Iryna Prymakova; Hanna Tserakh	4:21.288	+13.233	
13	Switzerland; Michelle Andres; Aline Seitz; Jasmin Liechti; Annika Liehner	4:21.491	+13.436	
14	Individual Neutral Athletes; Polina Danshina; Valeriya Valgonen; Alena Ivanchenko; Aglaya Kokareva	4:22.130	+14.075	
15	Poland; Wiktoria Pikulik; Tamara Szalińska; Martyna Szczęsna; Olga Wankiewicz	4:24.553	+16.498	
16	Ireland; Emma Jeffers; Aoife O'Brien; Fiona Mangan; Esther Wong	4:27.239	+19.184	
17	Chile; Scarlet Cortés; Javiera Garrido; Maite Ibarra; Aranza Villalón	4:34.610	+26.555	

=== First round ===
The first round was started on 15 October at 17:05.

First round heats were held as follows:
Heat 1: 7th v 8th fastest
Heat 2: 5th v 6th fastest
Heat 3: 2nd v 3rd fastest
Heat 4: 1st v 4th fastest

The winners of heats three and four advanced to the gold medal race. The remaining six teams were ranked on time, from which the top two proceeded to the bronze medal race.

Rank	Heat	Nation	Time	Notes
1	1	New Zealand; Samantha Donnelly; Bryony Botha; Prudence Fowler; Emily Shearman	4:10.819	
2	1	France; Clara Copponi; Valentine Fortin; Victoire Berteau; Marion Borras	4:13.466	
1	2	China; Gong Xianbing; Chen Ning; Wei Suwan; Wang Xiaoyue	4:11.171	
2	2	Australia; Alyssa Polites; Sophie Edwards; Claudia Marcks; Felicity Wilson-Haffenden	4:13.871	
1	3	Italy; Elisa Balsamo; Martina Alzini; Martina Fidanza; Vittoria Guazzini	4:06.771	QG
2	3	Germany; Messane Bräutigam; Franziska Brauße; Lisa Klein; Mieke Kröger	4:07.685	QB
1	4	Great Britain; Anna Morris; Megan Barker; Millie Couzens; Josie Knight	4:07.238	QG
2	4	Netherlands; Nienke Veenhoven; Lorena Wiebes; Lisa van Belle; Sofie van Rooijen	4:10.415	QB

=== Finals ===
The finals were started on 15 October at 18:00.

Rank	Nation	Time	Behind	Notes
Gold medal race
1st place, gold medalist(s)	Great Britain; Erin Boothman; Anna Morris; Millie Couzens; Josie Knight	4:04.610		
2nd place, silver medalist(s)	Italy; Chiara Consonni; Elisa Balsamo; Martina Fidanza; Vittoria Guazzini	4:09.967	+5.357	
Bronze medal race
3rd place, bronze medalist(s)	Germany; Messane Bräutigam; Franziska Brauße; Lisa Klein; Mieke Kröger	4:10.554		
4	Netherlands; Nienke Veenhoven; Lorena Wiebes; Lisa van Belle; Sofie van Rooijen	4:10.803	+0.249	
