= 2025 UEC European Track Championships – Women's team pursuit =

Women's team pursuit at the 2025 UEC European Track Championships
- Venue: Velodroom Limburg, Heusden-Zolder
- Date: 12–13 February
- Competitors: 44 from 10 nations
- Winning time: 4:14.213

Medalists
gold medal	Martina Alzini; Chiara Consonni; Martina Fidanza; Vittoria Guazzini	Italy
silver medal	Franziska Brauße; Lisa Klein; Mieke Kröger; Laura Süßemilch	Germany
bronze medal	Maddie Leech; Sophie Lewis; Grace Lister; Anna Morris; Neah Evans	Great Britain

The women's team pursuit competition at the 2025 UEC European Track Championships was held on 12 and 13 February 2025.

== Results ==
=== Qualifying ===
The eight fastest teams advanced to the first round.

Rank	Nation	Time	Behind	Notes
1	Germany; Franziska Brauße; Lisa Klein; Mieke Kröger; Laura Süßemilch	4:14.994		Q
2	Italy; Martina Alzini; Chiara Consonni; Martina Fidanza; Vittoria Guazzini	4:15.036	+0.042	Q
3	Great Britain; Maddie Leech; Sophie Lewis; Grace Lister; Anna Morris	4:18.745	+3.751	Q
4	Switzerland; Fabienne Buri; Jasmin Liechti; Annika Liehner; Aline Seitz	4:20.221	+5.227	Q
5	France; Victoire Berteau; Marion Borras; Elina Cabot; Clémence Chereau	4:20.989	+5.995	q
6	Belgium; Katrijn De Clercq; Hélène Hesters; Febe Jooris; Marith Vanhove	4:24.365	+9.371	q
7	Poland; Karolina Kumięga; Eliza Rabażyńska; Martyna Szczęsna; Olga Wankiewicz	4:25.990	+10.996	q
8	Ireland; Erin Creighton; Emma Jeffers; Aoife O'Brien; Esther Wong	4:29.432	+14.438	q
9	Spain; Ainara Albert; Isabella Escalera; Isabel Ferreres; Laura Rodríguez	4:32.730	+17.736	
10	Ukraine; Arina Korotieieva; Milana Ushakova; Viktoriia Yaroshenko; Tetiana Yashchenko	4:39.377	+24.383	

=== First round ===
First round heats were held as follows:
Heat 1: 6th v 7th fastest
Heat 2: 5th v 8th fastest
Heat 3: 2nd v 3rd fastest
Heat 4: 1st v 4th fastest

The winners of heats 3 and 4 proceeded to the gold medal race. The remaining six teams were ranked on time, from which the top two proceeded to the bronze medal race.

Heat	Rank	Nation	Time	Notes
1	1	Poland; Karolina Kumięga; Nikol Płosaj; Martyna Szczęsna; Olga Wankiewicz	4:22.771	
1	2	Belgium; Katrijn De Clercq; Hélène Hesters; Febe Jooris; Marith Vanhove	4:23.804	
2	1	France; Marion Borras; Elina Cabot; Clémence Chereau; Mélanie Dupin	4:20.559	QB
2	2	Ireland; Erin Creighton; Emma Jeffers; Aoife O'Brien; Esther Wong	4:30.775	
3	1	Italy; Martina Alzini; Chiara Consonni; Martina Fidanza; Vittoria Guazzini	4:13.111	QG
3	2	Great Britain; Neah Evans; Maddie Leech; Sophie Lewis; Anna Morris	4:15.674	QB
4	1	Germany; Franziska Brauße; Lisa Klein; Mieke Kröger; Laura Süßemilch	4:15.515	QG
4	2	Switzerland; Michelle Andres; Jasmin Liechti; Annika Liehner; Aline Seitz	4:21.956	

=== Finals ===
Rank	Nation	Time	Behind	Notes
Gold medal final
1st place, gold medalist(s)	Italy; Martina Alzini; Chiara Consonni; Martina Fidanza; Vittoria Guazzini	4:14.213		
2nd place, silver medalist(s)	Germany; Franziska Brauße; Lisa Klein; Mieke Kröger; Laura Süßemilch	4:14.939	+0.726	
Bronze medal final
3rd place, bronze medalist(s)	Great Britain; Maddie Leech; Sophie Lewis; Grace Lister; Anna Morris	4:18.147		
4	France; Marion Borras; Elina Cabot; Clémence Chereau; Mélanie Dupin	4:23.355	+5.208	
