= UCI Track Cycling World Championships – Women's team pursuit =

The UCI Track Cycling World Championships – Women's team pursuit is the world championship team pursuit for women held annually at the UCI Track Cycling World Championships. The first competition of this event was at the 2008 championships in Manchester, United Kingdom.

Following its introduction as an elite event Great Britain dominated the event, winning the gold medal on six out of the first eight occasions it was held. From 2014 onwards, the United States came to prominence, winning four titles, with Australia the winner on three occasions. In 2021, Germany became the fourth different nation to win gold in the event, with Italy becoming the fifth the following year, regaining the title in 2025. In between, two further wins from Great Britain meant that they lead the all time medal table in the event with eight titles.

Until 2014, the distance raced was 3 kilometres, or twelve laps on a typical indoor velodrome track. in 2014 the event was extended to 4000m, to match the men's event, and the number of riders raised from 3 to 4.

British rider Laura Trott, with 4 gold medals, 4 silver and 1 bronze medals, is the most successful individual rider in the event's history. Her team mate, Joanna Rowsell and American riders Jennifer Valente and Chloé Dygert have each won the event four times, while Australian Ashlee Ankudinoff has won three gold medals over a span of nine years.

== Medalists ==
Championships	Winner	Runner-up	Third
2008 Manchester	Wendy Houvenaghel; Rebecca Romero; Joanna Rowsell; Great Britain	Svitlana Halyuk; Lesya Kalytovska; Lyubov Shulika; Ukraine	Charlotte Becker; Verena Joos; Alexandra Sontheimer; Germany
2009 Pruszków	Wendy Houvenaghel; Lizzie Armitstead; Joanna Rowsell; Great Britain	Lauren Ellis; Jaime Nielsen; Alison Shanks; New Zealand	Ashlee Ankudinoff; Sarah Kent; Josephine Tomic; Australia
2010 Ballerup	Ashlee Ankudinoff; Sarah Kent; Josephine Tomic; Australia	Joanna Rowsell; Lizzie Armitstead; Wendy Houvenaghel; Great Britain	Rushlee Buchanan; Lauren Ellis; Alison Shanks; New Zealand
2011 Apeldoorn	Laura Trott; Wendy Houvenaghel; Danielle King; Great Britain	Sarah Hammer; Dotsie Bausch; Jennie Reed; United States	Jaime Nielsen; Kaytee Boyd; Alison Shanks; New Zealand
2012 Melbourne	Laura Trott; Danielle King; Joanna Rowsell; Great Britain	Annette Edmondson; Melissa Hoskins; Josephine Tomic; Australia	Tara Whitten; Jasmin Glaesser; Gillian Carleton; Canada
2013 Minsk	Laura Trott; Danielle King; Elinor Barker; Great Britain	Amy Cure; Annette Edmondson; Melissa Hoskins; Australia	Laura Brown; Jasmin Glaesser; Gillian Carleton; Canada
2014 Cali	Laura Trott; Katie Archibald; Elinor Barker; Joanna Rowsell; Great Britain	Laura Brown; Jasmin Glaesser; Allison Beveridge; Stephanie Roorda; Canada	Annette Edmondson; Amy Cure; Melissa Hoskins; Isabella King; Australia
2015 Yvelines	Annette Edmondson; Ashlee Ankudinoff; Amy Cure; Melissa Hoskins; Australia	Joanna Rowsell; Katie Archibald; Laura Trott; Elinor Barker; Great Britain	Allison Beveridge; Jasmin Glaesser; Kirsti Lay; Stephanie Roorda; Canada
2016 London	Kelly Catlin; Chloé Dygert; Jennifer Valente; Sarah Hammer; United States	Allison Beveridge; Jasmin Glaesser; Kirsti Lay; Georgia Simmerling; Canada	Laura Trott; Elinor Barker; Ciara Horne; Joanna Rowsell; Great Britain
2017 Hong Kong	Kelly Catlin; Chloé Dygert; Kimberly Geist; Jennifer Valente; United States	Amy Cure; Ashlee Ankudinoff; Alexandra Manly; Rebecca Wiasak; Australia	Jaime Nielsen; Racquel Sheath; Rushlee Buchanan; Kirstie James; Michaela Drummond; New Zealand
2018 Apeldoorn	Jennifer Valente; Kelly Catlin; Chloé Dygert; Kimberly Geist; United States	Katie Archibald; Elinor Barker; Laura Kenny; Emily Nelson; Ellie Dickinson; Great Britain	Elisa Balsamo; Letizia Paternoster; Silvia Valsecchi; Tatiana Guderzo; Simona Frapporti; Italy
2019 Pruszków	Annette Edmondson; Ashlee Ankudinoff; Georgia Baker; Amy Cure; Alexandra Manly; Australia	Laura Kenny; Katie Archibald; Elinor Barker; Ellie Dickinson; Great Britain	Bryony Botha; Michaela Drummond; Holly Edmondston; Kirstie James; Rushlee Buchanan; New Zealand
2020 Berlin	Jennifer Valente; Chloé Dygert Owen; Emma White; Lily Williams; United States	Elinor Barker; Katie Archibald; Ellie Dickinson; Neah Evans; Laura Kenny; Great Britain	Franziska Brauße; Lisa Brennauer; Lisa Klein; Gudrun Stock; Germany
2021 Roubaix	Franziska Brauße; Lisa Brennauer; Mieke Kröger; Laura Süßemilch; Germany	Elisa Balsamo; Martina Alzini; Chiara Consonni; Martina Fidanza; Italy	Katie Archibald; Megan Barker; Neah Evans; Josie Knight; Great Britain
2022 Saint-Quentin-en-Yvelines	Elisa Balsamo; Chiara Consonni; Martina Fidanza; Vittoria Guazzini; Martina Alzini; Italy	Neah Evans; Katie Archibald; Anna Morris; Josie Knight; Megan Barker; Great Britain	Marion Borras; Clara Copponi; Valentine Fortin; Victoire Berteau; France
2023 Glasgow	Katie Archibald; Elinor Barker; Josie Knight; Anna Morris; Megan Barker; Great Britain	Michaela Drummond; Ally Wollaston; Emily Shearman; Bryony Botha; New Zealand	Marion Borras; Valentine Fortin; Clara Copponi; Marie Le Net; Victoire Berteau; France
2024 Ballerup	Jessica Roberts; Katie Archibald; Josie Knight; Anna Morris; Megan Barker; Great Britain	Franziska Brauße; Lisa Klein; Mieke Kröger; Laura Süßemilch; Germany	Letizia Paternoster; Chiara Consonni; Martina Alzini; Vittoria Guazzini; Martina Fidanza; Italy
2025 Santiago	Vittoria Guazzini; Martina Fidanza; Martina Alzini; Federica Venturelli; Chiara Consonni; Italy	Messane Bräutigam; Franziska Brauße; Lisa Klein; Laura Süßemilch; Mieke Kröger; Germany	Maddie Leech; Megan Barker; Josie Knight; Anna Morris; Jessica Roberts; Great Britain
2026 Shanghai	Erin Boothman; Anna Morris; Millie Couzens; Josie Knight; Megan Barker; Great Britain	Chiara Consonni; Elisa Balsamo; Martina Fidanza; Vittoria Guazzini; Martina Alzini; Italy	Messane Bräutigam; Franziska Brauße; Lisa Klein; Mieke Kröger; Germany

== Medal table ==
Rank	Nation	Gold	Silver	Bronze	Total
1	Great Britain	9	6	3	18
2	United States	4	1	0	5
3	Australia	3	3	2	8
4	Italy	2	2	2	6
5	Germany	1	2	3	6
6	New Zealand	0	2	4	6
7	Canada	0	2	3	5
8	Ukraine	0	1	0	1
9	France	0	0	2	2
Totals (9 entries)		19	19	19	57
