= Laura Süßemilch =

German cyclist (born 1997)

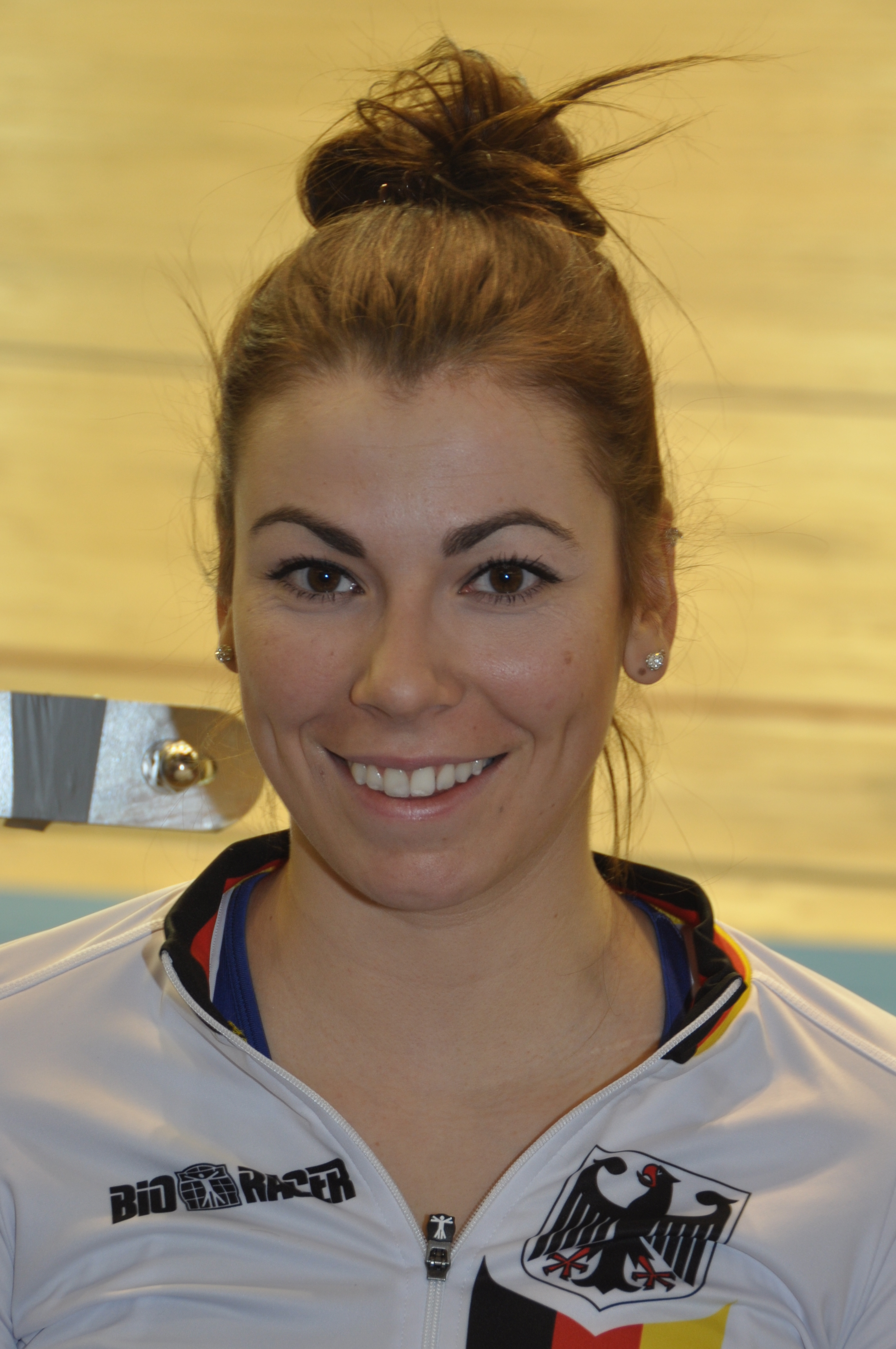
- Süßemilch in 2018

Personal information
- Born: 23 February 1997 (age 29) Weingarten, Germany
- Height: 1.80 m (5 ft 11 in)
- Weight: 67 kg (148 lb)

Cycling career
- Sport: Cycling
- Current team: Hess Cycling Team
- Disciplines: Road; Track
- Role: Rider

Professional teams
- 2019: Health Mate–Cyclelive Team
- 2020: Multum Accountants–LSK Ladies
- 2021–2022: Ciclismo Mundial
- 2023: Fenix–Deceuninck Continental
- 2024–: Hess Cycling Team

Major wins
- Track World Championships Team pursuit (2021)
Medal record
Women's track cycling
Representing Germany
World Championships
Gold medal – first place	2021 Roubaix	Team pursuit
Silver medal – second place	2024 Ballerup	Team pursuit
Silver medal – second place	2025 Santiago	Team pursuit
European Championships
Gold medal – first place	2021 Grenchen	Team pursuit
Silver medal – second place	2025 Heusden-Zolder	Team pursuit
Silver medal – second place	2026 Konya	Team pursuit
Bronze medal – third place	2023 Grenchen	Team pursuit
Bronze medal – third place	2024 Apeldoorn	Team pursuit

Laura Süßemilch (born 23 February 1997) is a German professional racing cyclist, who currently rides for UCI Women's Continental Team Hess Cycling Team.

== Major results ==
=== Track ===
2021
1st Team pursuit, UCI World Championships
1st Team pursuit, UEC European Championships
2023
3rd Team pursuit, UEC European Championships
2024
2nd Team pursuit, UCI World Championships
3rd Team pursuit, UEC European Championships
2025
2nd Team pursuit, UCI World Championships
2nd Team pursuit, UEC European Championships
