= Martina Alzini =

Italian cyclist (born 1997)

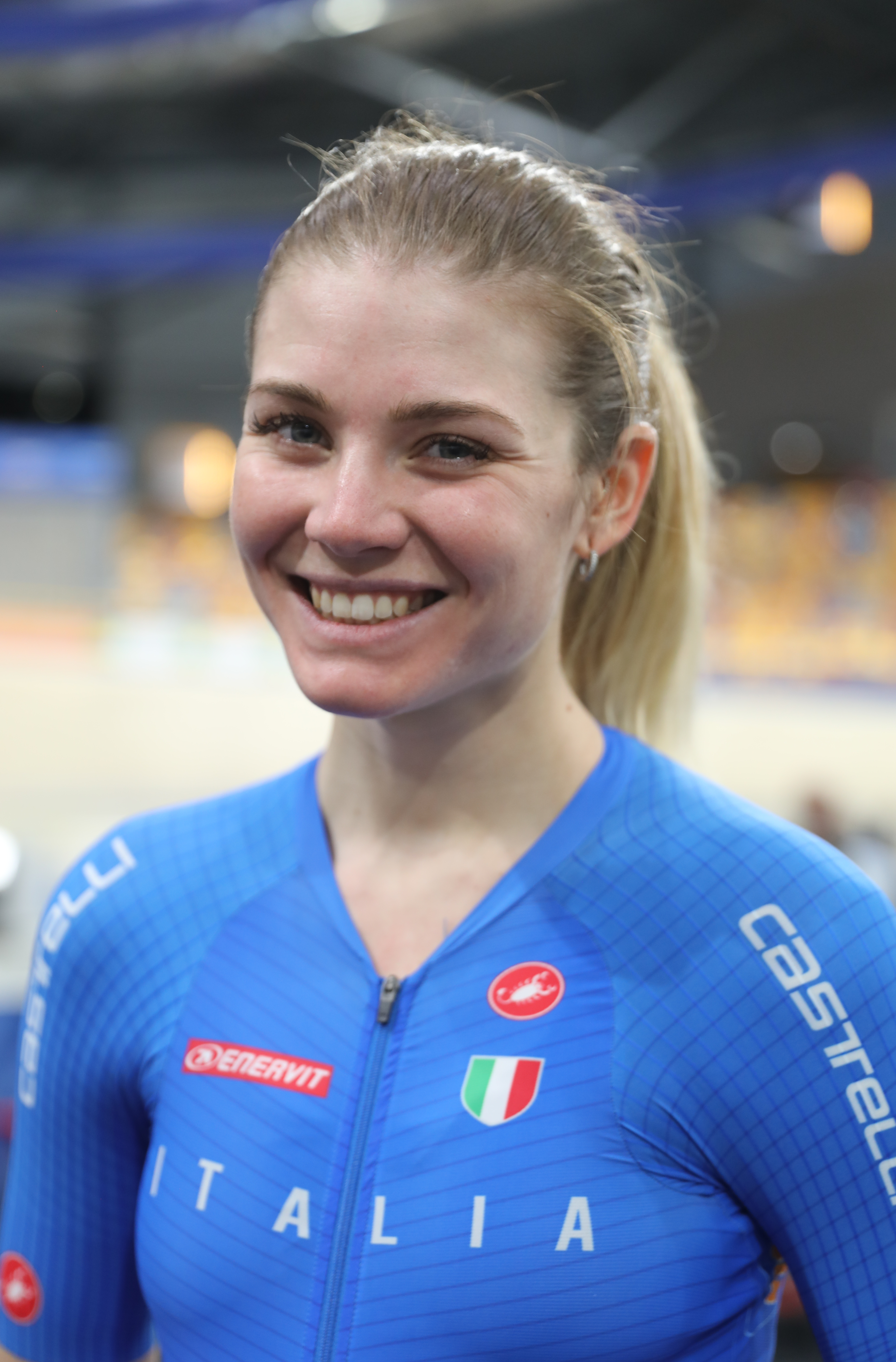
- Alzini in 2024

Personal information
- Born: 10 February 1997 (age 29) Legnano, Italy

Cycling career
- Sport: Cycling
- Current team: Cofidis
- Disciplines: Road; Track
- Role: Rider

Professional teams
- 2016–2017: Alé–Cipollini
- 2018: Astana
- 2019–2020: Bigla Pro Cycling
- 2020–2022: Valcar–Travel & Service
- 2023–: Cofidis

Major wins
- Track World Championships Team pursuit (2022, 2025)
Medal record
Women's track cycling
Representing Italy
World Championships
Gold medal – first place	2022 Saint-Quentin-en-Yvelines	Team pursuit
Gold medal – first place	2025 Santiago	Team pursuit
Silver medal – second place	2021 Roubaix	Team pursuit
Silver medal – second place	2026 Shanghai	Team pursuit
Bronze medal – third place	2024 Ballerup	Team pursuit
European Games
Gold medal – first place	2019 Minsk	Team pursuit
European Championships
Gold medal – first place	2025 Heusden-Zolder	Team pursuit
Silver medal – second place	2020 Plovdiv	Individual pursuit
Silver medal – second place	2020 Plovdiv	Team pursuit
Silver medal – second place	2021 Grenchen	Team pursuit
Silver medal – second place	2023 Grenchen	Team pursuit
Bronze medal – third place	2019 Apeldoorn	Team pursuit
Junior World Championships
Silver medal – second place	2014 Gwangmyeong	Omnium
Silver medal – second place	2014 Gwangmyeong	Team pursuit
Bronze medal – third place	2015 Astana	Omnium
U23 & Junior European Championships
Gold medal – first place	2017 Sangalhos	U23 Team pursuit
Gold medal – first place	2018 Aigle	U23 Team pursuit
Silver medal – second place	2016 Montichiari	U23 Team pursuit
Silver medal – second place	2018 Aigle	U23 Individual pursuit

Martina Alzini (born 10 February 1997) is an Italian professional racing cyclist, who currently rides for UCI Women's Continental Team Cofidis.

== Major results ==
=== Road ===
2015
5th Road race, UEC European Junior Championships
9th Trofeo Alfredo Binda Juniors
2018
7th Gran Premio della Liberazione
2021
5th Vuelta a la Comunitat Valenciana
7th GP Eco-Struct
2022
1st Stage 4 Bretagne Ladies Tour
3rd Ronde de Mouscron
5th Grand Prix International d'Isbergues
7th La Choralis Fourmies Féminine
2023
3rd Overall Tour de Normandie

1st Stage 3

3rd Tour de Berlin Feminin
3rd Trofeo Oro in Euro
7th Grand Prix International d'Isbergues
2024
4th GP Lucien Van Impe
7th Festival Elsy Jacobs

=== Track ===
2016
2nd Team pursuit, UEC European Under-23 Championships
2017
1st Team pursuit, UEC European Under-23 Championships
2018
UEC European Under-23 Championships

1st Team pursuit
2nd Individual pursuit

2019
1st Team pursuit, European Games
3rd Team pursuit, UEC European Championships
2020
UEC European Championships

2nd Individual pursuit
2nd Team pursuit

2021
2nd Team pursuit, UCI World Championships
2nd Team pursuit, UEC European Championships
2022
1st Team pursuit, UCI World Championships
2023
2nd Team pursuit, UEC European Championships
2024
3rd Team pursuit, UCI World Championships
2025
1st Team pursuit, UCI World Championships
1st Team pursuit, UEC European Championships
