= Franziska Brauße =

German cyclist (born 1998)

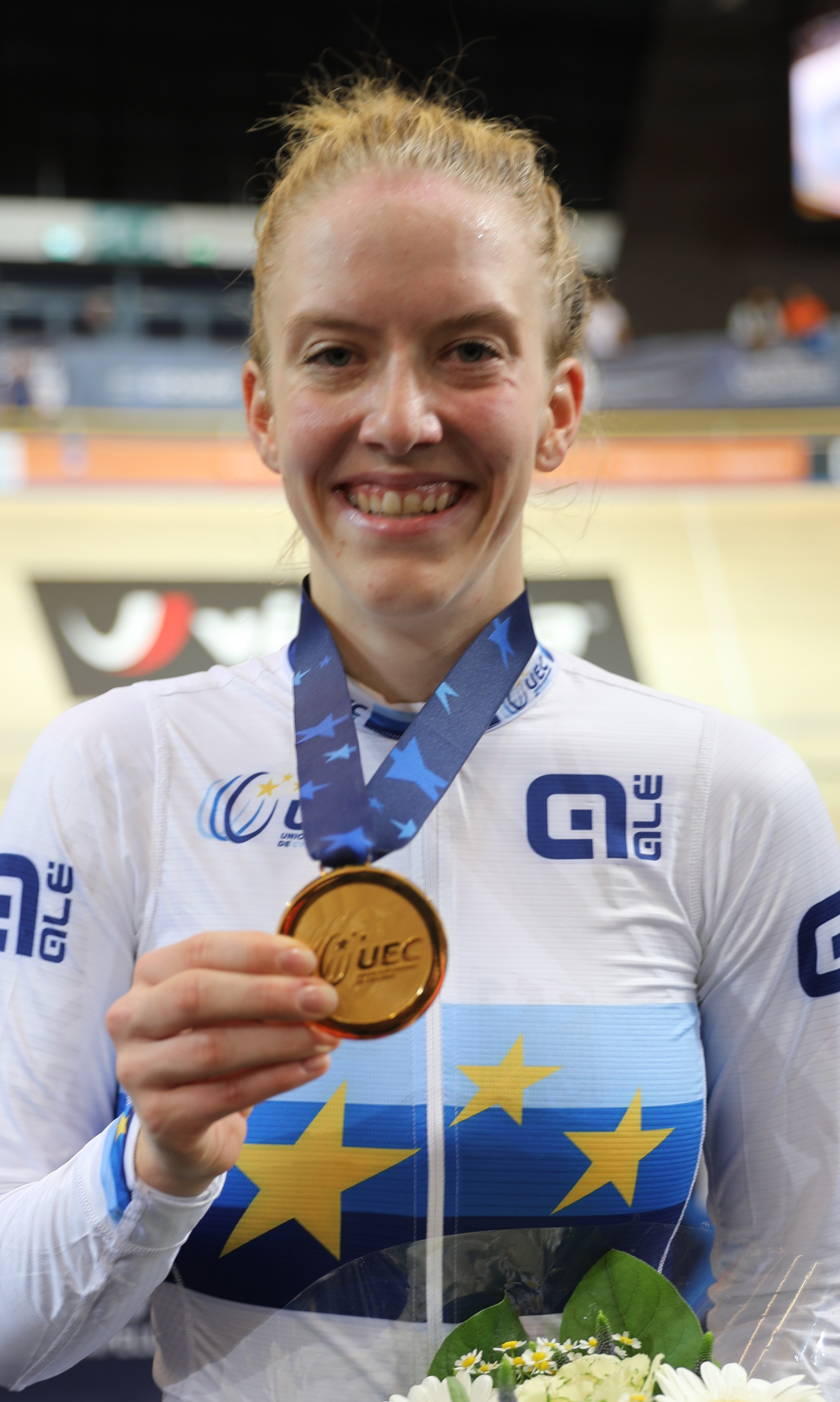
- Brauße in 2019

Personal information
- Born: 20 November 1998 (age 27) Metzingen, Germany
- Height: 1.67 m (5 ft 6 in)
- Weight: 60 kg (132 lb)

Cycling career
- Sport: Cycling
- Current team: Ceratizit Pro Cycling
- Disciplines: Road; Track
- Role: Rider

Amateur teams
- 2012–2016: TSV Betzingen
- 2015–2016: Mangertseder-WRSV
- 2017–2018: RSV Öschelbronn
- 2017–2019: Team-Gesundshop24.de

Professional team
- 2019–: WNT–Rotor Pro Cycling

Major wins
- Track Olympic Games Team pursuit (2020) World Championships Team pursuit (2021, 2022)
Medal record
Women's track cycling
Representing Germany
Olympic Games
Gold medal – first place	2020 Tokyo	Team pursuit
World Championships
Gold medal – first place	2021 Roubaix	Team pursuit
Gold medal – first place	2022 Saint-Quentin-en-Yvelines	Individual pursuit
Silver medal – second place	2021 Roubaix	Individual pursuit
Silver medal – second place	2023 Glasgow	Individual pursuit
Silver medal – second place	2024 Ballerup	Team pursuit
Silver medal – second place	2025 Santiago	Team pursuit
Bronze medal – third place	2020 Berlin	Individual pursuit
Bronze medal – third place	2020 Berlin	Team pursuit
Bronze medal – third place	2026 Shanghai	Team pursuit
European Championships
Gold medal – first place	2019 Apeldoorn	Individual pursuit
Gold medal – first place	2021 Grenchen	Team pursuit
Gold medal – first place	2022 Munich	Team pursuit
Gold medal – first place	2023 Grenchen	Individual pursuit
Silver medal – second place	2019 Apeldoorn	Team pursuit
Silver medal – second place	2024 Apeldoorn	Individual pursuit
Silver medal – second place	2025 Heusden-Zolder	Team pursuit
Silver medal – second place	2026 Konya	Team pursuit
Bronze medal – third place	2023 Grenchen	Team pursuit
Bronze medal – third place	2024 Apeldoorn	Team pursuit

Franziska Brauße (born 20 November 1998) is a German professional road and track, who currently rides for UCI Women's WorldTeam Ceratizit Pro Cycling. In 2012, Franziska Brauße won her first national title when she became German champion in the road race for schoolchildren. She is a multiple German champion and European champion. She won the gold medal at the 2020 Summer Olympics on the track in the women's team pursuit with Lisa Brennauer, Mieke Kröger and Lisa Klein, setting the new world record.

== Major results ==
=== Road ===
2016
2nd Time trial, National Junior Championships
2024
1st Chrono Féminin de Gatineau

=== Track ===
2013
2nd Team pursuit, National Junior Championships
2014
National Junior Championships

1st Individual pursuit
2nd 500m Time trial
2nd Team pursuit

2015
1st Team pursuit, National Junior Championships
2016
National Junior Championships

1st Individual pursuit
1st Points race
1st Team pursuit
2nd 500m Time trial

2017
National Championships

1st Madison
2nd Team pursuit
2nd Omnium
3rd Individual pursuit

3rd Team pursuit, UEC European Under-23 Championships
2018
UEC European Under-23 Championships

2nd Omnium
3rd Team pursuit

2019
UEC European Championships

1st Individual pursuit
2nd Team pursuit

UEC European Under-23 Championships

1st Individual pursuit
3rd Team pursuit

National Championships

1st Team pursuit
1st Omnium

2020
UEC European Under-23 Championships

1st Individual pursuit
2nd Team pursuit
2nd Madison (with Lea Lin Teutenberg)
3rd Points race

UCI World Championships

3rd Individual pursuit
3rd Team pursuit

2021
1st Team pursuit, Olympic Games
UCI World Championships

1st Team pursuit
2nd Individual pursuit

1st Team pursuit, UEC European Championships
2022
1st Individual pursuit, UCI World Championships
1st Team pursuit, UEC European Championships
2023
UEC European Championships

1st Individual pursuit
2nd Team pursuit

2nd Individual pursuit, UCI World Championships
2024
UEC European Championships

2nd Individual pursuit
3rd Team pursuit

2nd Team pursuit, UCI World Championships
2025
2nd Team pursuit, UCI World Championships
