= 2024 UCI Track Cycling World Championships =

Cycling world championships

- Venue: Ballerup, Denmark
- Date: 16–20 October
- Velodrome: Ballerup Super Arena
- Events: 22

The 2024 UCI Track Cycling World Championships were held from 16 to 20 October 2024, at the Ballerup Super Arena in Ballerup, Denmark. It was the 121st edition of the UCI Track Cycling World Championships.

== Schedule ==
A total of 22 events were held, with 11 events each for men and women.

All times are local UTC+2.

Date	Time	Event
16 October	11:30	Women's team pursuit qualifying
16 October	12:47	Men's team pursuit qualifying
16 October	13:59	Women's team sprint qualifying
16 October	14:27	Men's team sprint qualifying
16 October	18:32	Women's team sprint first round
16 October	18:46	Men's team sprint first round
16 October	19:00	Women's scratch race
16 October	19:20	Women's team sprint final
16 October	19:36	Men's team sprint final
16 October	19:44	Men's team pursuit first round
17 October	14:00	Men's keirin first round
17 October	14:27	Women's sprint qualifying
17 October	15:18	Men's keirin first round repechage
17 October	15:45	Women's sprint 1/16 finals
17 October	16:23	Men's keirin quarterfinals
17 October	16:37	Women's sprint 1/8 finals
17 October	18:30	Women's sprint quarterfinals
17 October	18:32	Women's team pursuit first round
17 October	19:16	Men's keirin semifinals
17 October	19:27	Men's team pursuit final
17 October	19:57	Women's elimination race
17 October	20:39	Men's keirin final
17 October	20:51	Men's scratch race final
17 October	21:14	Women's team pursuit final

Date	Time	Event
18 October	14:00	Men's 1km time trial qualifying
18 October	14:38	Women's omnium scratch race
18 October	14:53	Men's individual pursuit qualifying
18 October	16:33	Women's omnium tempo race
18 October	18:30	Women's sprint semifinals
18 October	18:32	Men's points race
18 October	19:34	Women's Omnium elimination race
18 October	20:02	Men's 1km time trial final
18 October	20:30	Women's sprint final
18 October	20:38	Men's individual pursuit final
18 October	21:03	Women's omnium points race
19 October	12:30	Women's 500m time trial qualifying
19 October	13:04	Men's sprint qualifying
19 October	13:52	Men's omnium scratch race
19 October	14:10	Men's sprint 1/16 finals
19 October	14:48	Women's individual pursuit qualifying
19 October	16:14	Men's sprint 1/8 finals
19 October	16:33	Men's omnium tempo race
19 October	18:32	Women's 500m time trial final
19 October	18:54	Men's sprint quarterfinals
19 October	19:10	Women's madison
19 October	19:54	Men's omnium elimination race
19 October	20:46	Women's individual pursuit final
19 October	21:07	Men's omnium points race

Date	Time	Event
20 October	11:00	Men's sprint semifinals
20 October	11:08	Women's keirin first round
20 October	11:53	Women's keirin first round repechage
20 October	13:30	Men's sprint final
20 October	13:32	Women's keirin quarterfinals
20 October	13:56	Women's points race
20 October	14:33	Women's keirin semifinals
20 October	14:42	Men's elimination race
20 October	15:26	Women's keirin final
20 October	15:50	Men's madison

== Medal summary ==
Events with a grey background are non-Olympic events.

=== Medal table ===
* Host nation (Denmark)

Rank	Nation	Gold	Silver	Bronze	Total
1	Netherlands	4	5	2	11
2	Great Britain	4	4	5	13
3	Denmark*	4	2	1	7
4	Japan	3	0	3	6
5	New Zealand	2	0	2	4
6	Belgium	1	3	0	4
7	Italy	1	2	1	4
8	Germany	1	1	1	3
9	Spain	1	0	0	1
–	Individual Neutral Athletes	1	0	0	1
10	United States	0	2	1	3
11	Australia	0	1	1	2
11	France	0	1	1	2
13	Israel	0	1	0	1
14	Canada	0	0	1	1
14	Colombia	0	0	1	1
14	Ireland	0	0	1	1
14	Norway	0	0	1	1
Totals (17 entries)		22	22	22	66

=== Men ===
Event	Gold	Silver	Bronze
Individual pursuit	Jonathan Milan; Italy	Josh Charlton; Great Britain	Daniel Bigham; Great Britain
Team pursuit	Denmark; Tobias Hansen; Carl-Frederik Bévort; Niklas Larsen; Frederik Madsen; Rasmus Pedersen	Great Britain; Ethan Hayter; Josh Charlton; Charlie Tanfield; Oliver Wood; Rhys Britton	Germany; Tim Torn Teutenberg; Benjamin Boos; Ben Jochum; Bruno Keßler; Felix Groß
Sprint	Harrie Lavreysen; Netherlands	Jeffrey Hoogland; Netherlands	Kaiya Ota; Japan
Team sprint	Netherlands; Roy van den Berg; Harrie Lavreysen; Jeffrey Hoogland	Australia; Ryan Elliott; Leigh Hoffman; Thomas Cornish	Japan; Yoshitaku Nagasako; Kaiya Ota; Yuta Obara
Keirin	Kento Yamasaki; Japan	Mikhail Iakovlev; Israel	Kevin Quintero; Colombia
Madison	Germany; Roger Kluge; Tim Torn Teutenberg	Belgium; Lindsay De Vylder; Fabio Van Den Bossche	Denmark; Niklas Larsen; Michael Mørkøv
Omnium	Lindsay De Vylder; Belgium	Simone Consonni; Italy	Yanne Dorenbos; Netherlands
Scratch	Kazushige Kuboki; Japan	Tobias Hansen; Denmark	Clément Petit; France
Points race	Sebastián Mora; Spain	Niklas Larsen; Denmark	Philip Heijnen; Netherlands
Elimination	Tobias Hansen; Denmark	Elia Viviani; Italy	Dylan Bibic; Canada
1 km time trial	Harrie Lavreysen; Netherlands	Jeffrey Hoogland; Netherlands	Joseph Truman; Great Britain

=== Women ===
Event	Gold	Silver	Bronze
Individual pursuit	Anna Morris; Great Britain	Chloé Dygert; United States	Bryony Botha; New Zealand
Team pursuit	Great Britain; Jessica Roberts; Katie Archibald; Josie Knight; Anna Morris; Megan Barker	Germany; Franziska Brauße; Lisa Klein; Mieke Kröger; Laura Süßemilch	Italy; Letizia Paternoster; Chiara Consonni; Martina Alzini; Vittoria Guazzini; Martina Fidanza
Sprint	Emma Finucane; Great Britain	Hetty van de Wouw; Netherlands	Mina Sato; Japan
Team sprint	Great Britain; Katy Marchant; Sophie Capewell; Emma Finucane	Netherlands; Kimberly Kalee; Hetty van de Wouw; Steffie van der Peet; Kyra Lamberink	Australia; Molly McGill; Kristina Clonan; Alessia McCaig
Keirin	Mina Sato; Japan	Hetty van de Wouw; Netherlands	Katy Marchant; Great Britain
Madison	Denmark; Amalie Dideriksen; Julie Norman Leth	France; Victoire Berteau; Marion Borras	Great Britain; Neah Evans; Katie Archibald
Omnium	Ally Wollaston; New Zealand	Jessica Roberts; Great Britain	Anita Stenberg; Norway
Scratch	Lorena Wiebes; Netherlands	Jennifer Valente; United States	Ally Wollaston; New Zealand
Points race	Julie Norman Leth; Denmark	Lotte Kopecky; Belgium	Lara Gillespie; Ireland
Elimination	Ally Wollaston; New Zealand	Lotte Kopecky; Belgium	Jennifer Valente; United States
500 m time trial	Yana Burlakova; Individual Neutral Athletes	Sophie Capewell; Great Britain	Katy Marchant; Great Britain
