= Martina Fidanza =

Italian racing cyclist

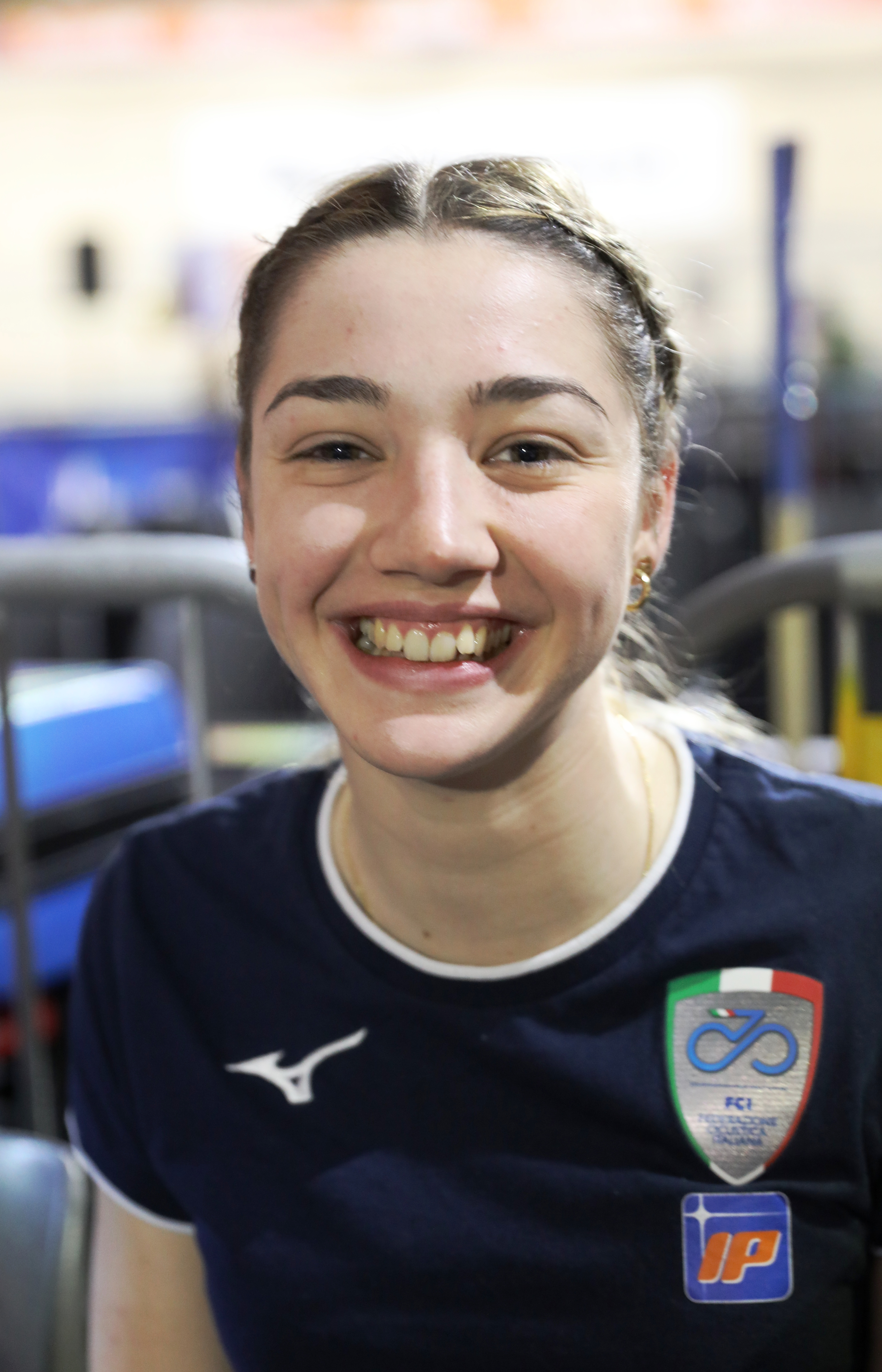
- Fidanza in 2024

Personal information
- Full name: Martina Fidanza
- Born: 5 November 1999 (age 26) Ponte San Pietro, Italy
- Height: 1.70 m (5 ft 7 in)
- Weight: 60 kg (132 lb)

Cycling career
- Sport: Cycling
- Current team: Visma–Lease a Bike
- Disciplines: Road; Track
- Role: Rider
- Rider type: Sprinter

Professional teams
- 2018–2021: Eurotarget–Bianchi–Vitasana
- 2022–2024: Ceratizit–WNT Pro Cycling
- 2025–: Visma–Lease a Bike

Major wins
- Track World Championships Scratch (2021, 2022) Team pursuit (2022, 2025)
Medal record
Women's track cycling
Representing Italy
World Championships
Gold medal – first place	2021 Roubaix	Scratch
Gold medal – first place	2022 Saint-Quentin-en-Yvelines	Scratch
Gold medal – first place	2022 Saint-Quentin-en-Yvelines	Team pursuit
Gold medal – first place	2025 Santiago	Team pursuit
Silver medal – second place	2021 Roubaix	Team pursuit
Silver medal – second place	2026 Shanghai	Team pursuit
Bronze medal – third place	2024 Ballerup	Team pursuit
European Games
Silver medal – second place	2019 Minsk	Scratch
European Championships
Gold medal – first place	2020 Plovdiv	Scratch
Gold medal – first place	2024 Apeldoorn	Team pursuit
Gold medal – first place	2025 Heusden-Zolder	Scratch
Gold medal – first place	2025 Heusden-Zolder	Team pursuit
Silver medal – second place	2021 Grenchen	Team pursuit
Silver medal – second place	2022 Munich	Team pursuit
Silver medal – second place	2023 Grenchen	Team pursuit
Silver medal – second place	2025 Heusden-Zolder	1 km time trial
Bronze medal – third place	2024 Apeldoorn	Scratch
Women's road cycling
Mediterranean Games
Silver medal – second place	2026 Taranto	Road race

Martina Fidanza (born 5 November 1999) is an Italian professional racing cyclist, who currently rides for UCI Women's WorldTeam Visma–Lease a Bike.

== Personal life ==
Fidanza is the daughter of Giovanni Fidanza. Her sister, Arianna Fidanza, is also a racing cyclist.

== Major results ==
=== Road ===
2017
2nd Road race, National Junior Championships
3rd Piccolo Trofeo Alfredo Binda
2018
9th Trofee Maarten Wynants
2022
1st Stage 2 Giro della Toscana
2023
1st Ronde de Mouscron
2nd Arnhem–Veenendaal Classic
5th Scheldeprijs
7th Omloop der Kempen

=== Track ===
2016
1st Team sprint, National Junior Championships
2nd Team sprint, UCI World Junior Championships
3rd Keirin, Jihomoravsky Kraj
2017
UCI World Junior Championships

1st Scratch
1st Team pursuit

UEC European Junior Championships

1st Team pursuit
1st Scratch
2nd Keirin

2nd Scratch, National Junior Championships
2018
1st Keirin, National Championships
2nd Team pursuit, UEC European Under-23 Championships
2019
UCI World Cup

1st Scratch, Hong Kong
2nd Scratch, Minsk

National Championships

1st Keirin
3rd Sprint

2nd Scratch, European Games
2020
UEC European Under-23 Championships

1st Team pursuit
1st Scratch
1st Madison

1st Scratch, UEC European Championships
2021
UCI World Championships

1st Scratch
2nd Team pursuit

UEC European Under-23 Championships

1st Team pursuit
1st Madison (with Chiara Consonni)
3rd Scratch

1st Madison, National Championships (with Rachele Barbieri)
2nd Team pursuit, UEC European Championships
2022
UCI World Championships

1st Team pursuit
1st Scratch

2nd Team pursuit, UEC European Championships
2025
1st Team pursuit, UCI World Championships
