= Josie Knight =

British cyclist (born 1997)

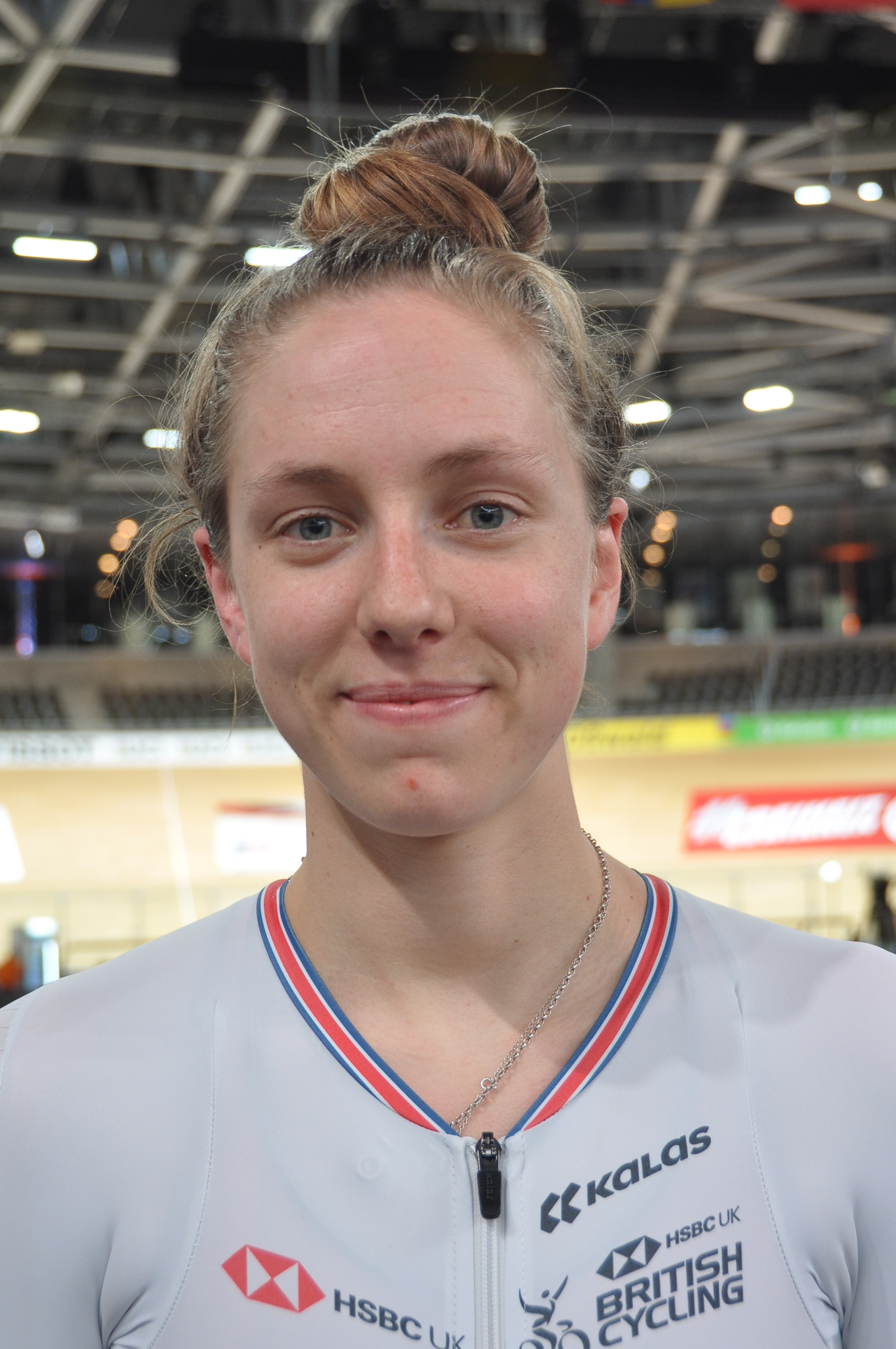
- Knight in 2020

Personal information
- Born: 29 March 1997 (age 29) Aylesbury, Buckinghamshire, United Kingdom

Cycling career
- Sport: Cycling
- Discipline: Track
- Role: Rider

Major wins
- Track World Championships Team pursuit (2023, 2024, 2026)
Medal record
Women's track cycling
Representing Great Britain
Olympic Games
Silver medal – second place	2020 Tokyo	Team pursuit
Bronze medal – third place	2024 Paris	Team pursuit
World Championships
Gold medal – first place	2023 Glasgow	Team pursuit
Gold medal – first place	2024 Ballerup	Team pursuit
Gold medal – first place	2026 Shanghai	Team pursuit
Silver medal – second place	2022 Saint-Quentin-en-Yvelines	Team pursuit
Silver medal – second place	2025 Santiago	Individual pursuit
Silver medal – second place	2026 Shanghai	Individual pursuit
Bronze medal – third place	2021 Roubaix	Team pursuit
Bronze medal – third place	2022 Saint-Quentin-en-Yvelines	Individual pursuit
Bronze medal – third place	2025 Santiago	Team pursuit
European Games
Silver medal – second place	2019 Minsk	Team pursuit
European Championships
Gold medal – first place	2020 Plovdiv	Team pursuit
Gold medal – first place	2023 Grenchen	Team pursuit
Gold medal – first place	2024 Apeldoorn	Individual pursuit
Gold medal – first place	2026 Konya	Individual pursuit
Gold medal – first place	2026 Konya	Team pursuit
Silver medal – second place	2023 Grenchen	Individual pursuit
Silver medal – second place	2024 Apeldoorn	Team pursuit
Representing England
Commonwealth Games
Silver medal – second place	2026 Glasgow	Individual pursuit
Bronze medal – third place	2022 Birmingham	Team pursuit
Representing Ireland
U23 & Junior European Championships
Silver medal – second place	2014 Anadia	Individual pursuit

Josie Knight (born 29 March 1997) is a British professional racing cyclist who has at various stages represented Ireland, Great Britain, and England. Born in Buckinghamshire, England, her family moved to Dingle, Co. Kerry, in Ireland during her early infancy. Knight competed for Ireland prior to 2018, winning silver at the European Junior Championships in the individual pursuit.

Following her transfer to Team GB in 2018, Knight was part of the British team that won the silver medal in the team pursuit at the 2020 Summer Olympics in Tokyo. She also won a bronze medal in the same event at the 2024 Summer Olympics in Paris. She is a two-time world and three-time European champion in the team pursuit, and in both 2024 and 2026, she became the European champion in the individual pursuit. As of February 2026, she is the world-record holder in the individual pursuit.

== Early life ==
Knight was born in 1997 near Aylesbury, Buckinghamshire but moved to Ireland shortly afterwards. She spent her childhood in Dingle, County Kerry, Ireland. She attended Scoil an Ghleanna Primary School and Pobalscoil Chorca Dhuibhne Secondary School in Dingle.

She rode at the 2015 UCI Track Cycling World Championships.

== Becoming British ==
Knight switched from Ireland to Great Britain in 2018. She did so as she felt that she could better progress her cycling career in the UK. At that time, Ireland had no prospects of entering a team for Olympics 2020 and they did not possess an indoor Velodrome to train on. Knight became British champion when winning the individual pursuit at the 2020 British National Track Championships.

Knight was chosen to be part of the Team GB's 26-strong cycling squad for the delayed 2020 Tokyo Olympics where she was joined by Katie Archibald, Elinor Barker, Laura Kenny and Neah Evans for the endurance races. The team won the silver medal in the women's team pursuit event.

She was part of the Great Britain squad which won gold in the team pursuit at the 2024 UCI Track Cycling World Championships in Ballerup, Denmark.

Knight was part of the British team pursuit line-up that won bronze at the 2025 UCI Track Cycling World Championships. She then finished in second position in the individual pursuit, where she was beaten in the final by her international teammate Anna Morris.

At the 2026 European Championships in Konya, Knight was part of the British team pursuit quartet who set a new world record en route to the gold medal. The team consisting of Knight, Archibald, Morris, and Millie Couzens also set a new world record of 4:02.808 in the final against Germany. She then set a second world record in the championships during the individual pursuit. Her time of 4:19.461 made her the first woman to complete the event in under 4:20 and broke the previous record of 4:23.624 set by Italian cyclist Vittoria Bussi. She went on to defeat Dutch rider Mischa Bredewold in the gold-medal race. In June 2026, she finished second at the British National Road Race Championships.

At the 2026 Commonwealth Games in Glasgow, Knight missed out on a medal in the team pursuit, after England were defeated by Wales in the bronze medal race. One day later, she won a silver medal in the individual pursuit, after she was beaten by Wales' Morris.

At the 2026 UCI Track Cycling World Championships in Shanghai, Knight, Morris, Couzens and Boothman became world champions in the team pursuit after overcoming Italy in the final. Later in the competition, she won a silver medal in the individual pursuit following a defeat by Couzens in the gold medal race.

== Major results ==
=== Road ===
2019
2nd Overall Rás na mBan

1st Points classification
1st Young rider classification
1st Stages 1, 2 & 3

2026
2nd Road race, National Championships

=== Track ===
2016
2nd Omnium, Dublin International
2019
2nd Team pursuit, European Games
2020
1st Team pursuit, UEC European Championships
2021
2nd Team pursuit, Olympic Games
3rd Team pursuit, UCI World Championships
2022
UCI World Championships

2nd Team pursuit
3rd Individual pursuit

3rd Team pursuit, Commonwealth Games
2023
1st Team pursuit, UCI World Championships
UEC European Championships

1st Team pursuit
2nd Individual pursuit

2024
1st Team pursuit, UCI World Championships
UEC European Championships

1st Individual pursuit
2nd Team pursuit

2025
UCI World Championships

2nd Individual pursuit
3rd Team pursuit

2026
UCI World Championships

1st Team pursuit
2nd Individual pursuit

UEC European Championships

1st Individual pursuit
1st Team pursuit

National Championships

1st Individual pursuit
2nd Points race

2nd Individual pursuit, Commonwealth Games
