= Megan Barker =

Welsh cyclist (born 1997)

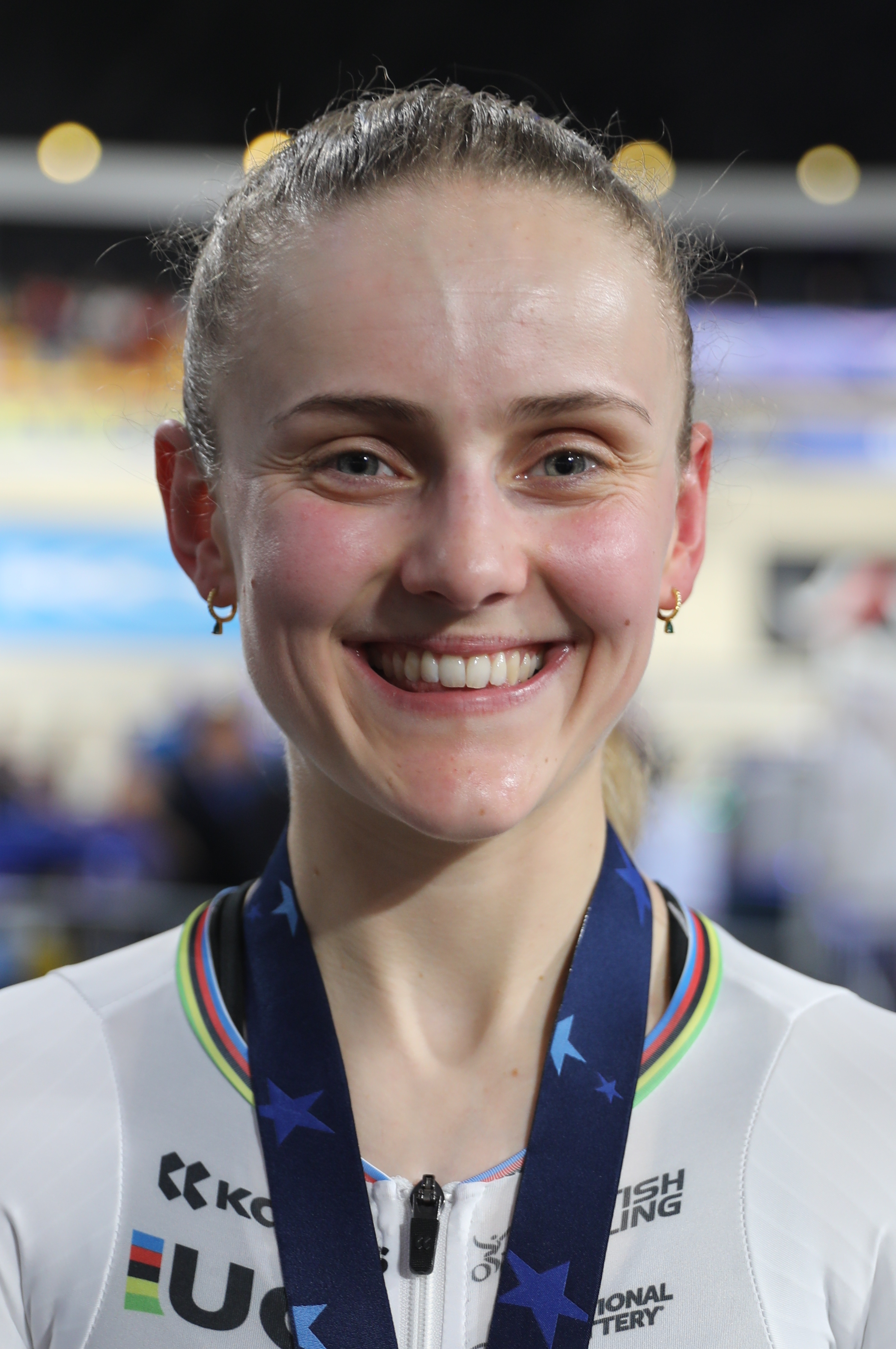
- Barker in 2024

Personal information
- Full name: Megan Elizabeth Barker
- Born: 15 August 1997 (age 29)

Cycling career
- Sport: Cycling
- Current team: Team Inspired
- Disciplines: Road; Track; Ice
- Role: Rider

Amateur teams
- 2005–2010: Maindy Flyerers CC
- 2011–2013: Cardiff Ajax CC
- 2014–2015: MnD Fusion RT
- 2016–2018: Team Breeze
- 2023–: Team Inspired

Professional teams
- 2019: Drops
- 2020–2022: CAMS–Tifosi

Major wins
- Track World Championships Team pursuit (2023, 2024, 2026)
Medal record
Women's track cycling
Representing Great Britain
World Championships
Gold medal – first place	2023 Glasgow	Team pursuit
Gold medal – first place	2024 Ballerup	Team pursuit
Gold medal – first place	2026 Shanghai	Team pursuit
Silver medal – second place	2022 Saint-Quentin-en-Yvelines	Team pursuit
Bronze medal – third place	2021 Roubaix	Team pursuit
Bronze medal – third place	2025 Santiago	Team pursuit
European Games
Gold medal – first place	2019 Minsk	Madison
Silver medal – second place	2019 Minsk	Team pursuit
European Championships
Silver medal – second place	2024 Apeldoorn	Team pursuit
Representing Wales
Commonwealth Games
Bronze medal – third place	2026 Glasgow	Team pursuit

Megan Elizabeth Barker (born 15 August 1997) is a Welsh professional racing cyclist who currently rides for RCC Racing and British Cycling. She is the current (2026) National Circuit Race Champion and was also National Circuit Race Champion in 2023. She represented Wales at the 2018 Commonwealth Games. She was part of the Great Britain squad which won gold in the team pursuit at the 2024 UCI Track Cycling World Championships in Ballerup, Denmark. Her elder sister, Elinor Barker, is also a professional cyclist.

Barker was part of the team pursuit line-up that won bronze at the 2025 UCI Track Cycling World Championships.

In April 2026, Barker won a silver medal in the team pursuit at the Track World Cup event in Hong Kong. In June 2026, she won the British Circuit Race Championships for a second time. At the 2026 Commonwealth Games in Glasgow, Barker, along with Jessica Roberts, Anna Morris and Ciara Oliva, won the bronze medal for Wales after defeating England in the team pursuit.

== Major results ==
=== Road ===
2018
5th Road race, National Championships
2023
1st Circuit race, National Championships
2026
1st Circuit race, National Championships

=== Track ===
2019
European Games

1st Madison (with Jessica Roberts)
2nd Team pursuit

2020
3rd Individual pursuit, National Championships
2021
3rd Team pursuit, UCI World Championships
2022
2nd Team pursuit, UCI World Championships
2023
1st Team pursuit, UCI World Championships
2024
1st Team pursuit, UCI World Championships
2nd Team pursuit, UEC European Championships
2025
3rd Team pursuit, UCI World Championships
2026
Track Cycling World Cup

2nd Team pursuit, Hong Kong

Commonwealth Games

3rd Team pursuit
