= Letizia Paternoster =

Italian cyclist (born 1999)

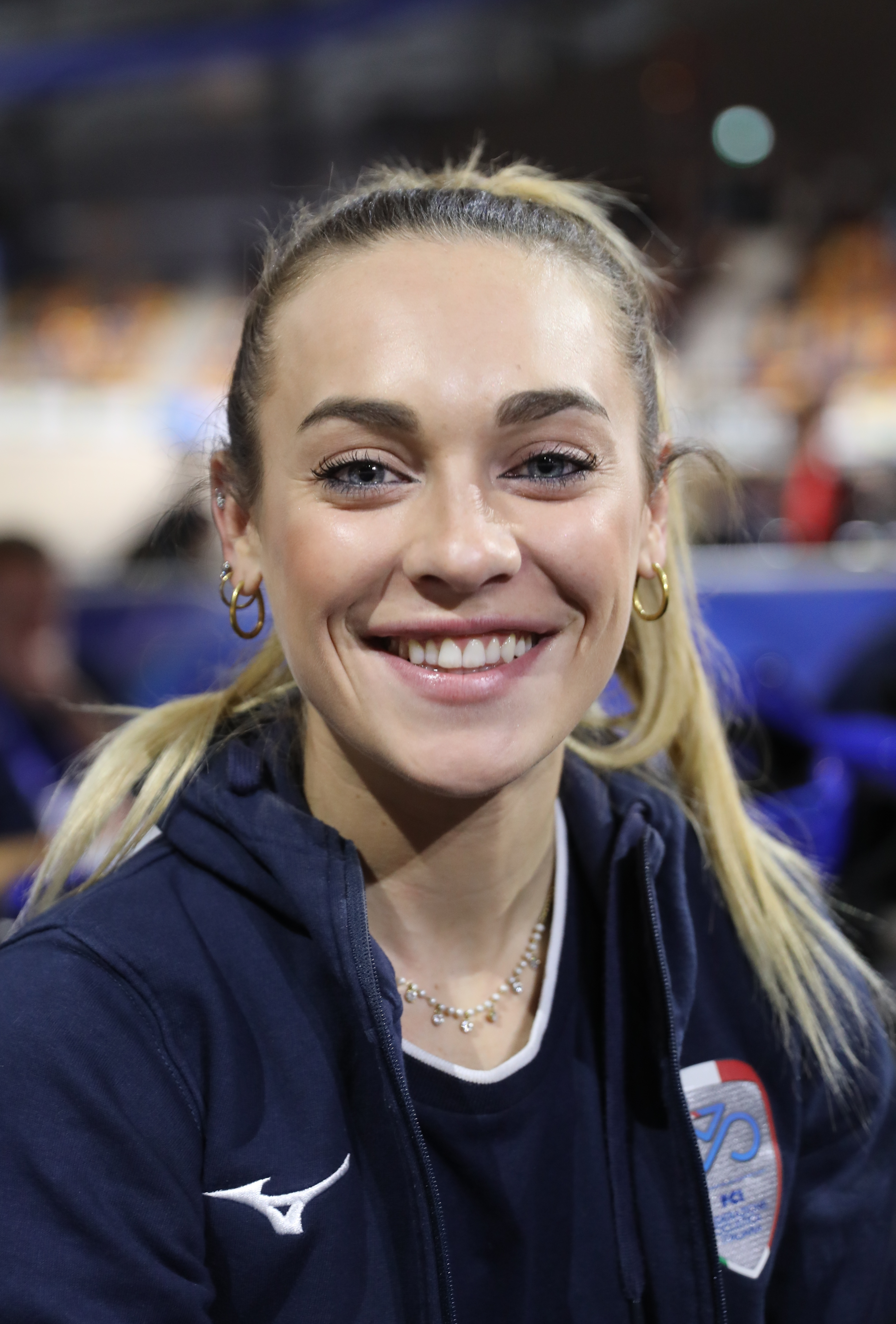
- Paternoster at the 2024 UEC European Track Championships

Personal information
- Born: 22 July 1999 (age 27) Cles, Italy
- Height: 1.64 m (5 ft 5 in)
- Weight: 53 kg (117 lb)

Cycling career
- Sport: Cycling
- Current team: Liv AlUla Jayco
- Disciplines: Road; Track
- Role: Rider

Professional teams
- 2018: Astana
- 2019–2022: Trek–Segafredo
- 2023–present: Liv AlUla Jayco

Major wins
- Festival Elsy Jacobs (2018)
Medal record
Event	1st	2nd	3rd
World Championships	1	3	4
European Games	1	0	0
European Championships	2	5	2
Total	4	8	6
Women's track cycling
Representing Italy
World Championships
Gold medal – first place	2021 Roubaix	Elimination
Silver medal – second place	2019 Pruszków	Omnium
Silver medal – second place	2020 Berlin	Omnium
Silver medal – second place	2021 Roubaix	Team pursuit
Bronze medal – third place	2018 Apeldoorn	Madison
Bronze medal – third place	2018 Apeldoorn	Team pursuit
Bronze medal – third place	2020 Berlin	Madison
Bronze medal – third place	2024 Ballerup	Team pursuit
European Games
Gold medal – first place	2019 Minsk	Team pursuit
European Championships
Gold medal – first place	2017 Berlin	Team pursuit
Gold medal – first place	2024 Apeldoorn	Team pursuit
Silver medal – second place	2018 Glasgow	Team pursuit
Silver medal – second place	2021 Grenchen	Elimination
Silver medal – second place	2021 Grenchen	Team pursuit
Silver medal – second place	2022 Munich	Team pursuit
Silver medal – second place	2023 Grenchen	Team pursuit
Bronze medal – third place	2018 Glasgow	Omnium
Bronze medal – third place	2019 Apeldoorn	Team pursuit
Bronze medal – third place	2026 Konya	Team pursuit

Letizia Paternoster (born 22 July 1999) is an Italian road and track cyclist, who rides for UCI Women's WorldTeam Liv AlUla Jayco.

In October 2017, she won gold in the team pursuit at the 2017 UEC European Track Championships in Berlin. In April 2018, she won the Gran Premio della Liberazione in Rome, her first professional road race victory. Two days later, she started in the Festival Elsy Jacobs, a three-day stage event in Luxembourg, and claimed the final stage and the general classification. Actor Peter Facinelli is her uncle.

== Major results ==
=== Road ===
2016
1st Stage 1 (ITT) Albstadt-Frauen-Etappenrennen
2nd Road race, National Junior Championships
3rd Piccolo Trofeo Alfredo Binda
4th Road race, UEC European Junior Championships
5th Road race, UCI World Junior Championships
2017
National Junior Championships

1st Road race
1st Time trial

UEC European Junior Championships

2nd Time trial
3rd Road race

3rd Road race, UCI World Junior Championships
3rd Gran Premio Bruno Beghelli
4th GP della Liberazione
4th Piccolo Trofeo Alfredo Binda
2018
1st Overall GP Elsy Jacobs

1st Points classification
1st Young rider classification
1st Stage 2

1st GP della Liberazione
3rd Road race, UEC European Under-23 Championships
2019
1st Road race, UEC European Under-23 Championships
1st Stage 1 Tour Down Under
3rd Gent–Wevelgem
5th RideLondon Classique
7th Overall BeNe Ladies Tour
7th Time trial, UEC European Under-23 Championships
8th Road race, European Games
8th Overall Madrid Challenge by la Vuelta
8th Gran Premio Bruno Beghelli
2023
6th Omloop van het Hageland
9th Ronde van Drenthe
10th Nokere Koerse
10th Scheldeprijs
2024
1st Tour de Gatineau
3rd Dwars door Vlaanderen
4th Ronde van Drenthe
4th Overall RideLondon Classique
4th Chrono Gatineau
5th Overall Tour of Britain
9th Tour of Flanders
2025
5th Trofeo Alfredo Binda
9th Le Samyn
2026
10th Omloop Het Nieuwsblad

=== Track ===
2016
UCI Junior World Championships

1st Points race
1st Team pursuit

UEC European Junior Championships

1st Team pursuit
1st Points race
1st Scratch race

2017
1st Team pursuit, UEC European Track Championships
UEC European Junior Championships

1st Team pursuit
1st Individual pursuit
1st Elimination race
1st Omnium
1st Madison

Track Cycling Challenge

2nd Madison (with Maria Giulia Confalonieri)
2nd Omnium

2018
UEC European Track Championships

2nd Team pursuit
3rd Omnium

UCI World Championships

3rd Madison
3rd Team pursuit

International Belgian Track Meeting

2nd Points Race
3rd Madison (with Marta Cavalli)

2019
UEC European U23 Championships

1st Team pursuit
1st Madison

1st Team pursuit, 2019 European Games
2nd Omnium, UCI World Championships
2018–19 UCI Track Cycling World Cup

1st Team pursuit (Round 6, Hong Kong)
2nd Madison (Round 5, Cambridge)
3rd Team pursuit (Round 5, Cambridge)

2019–20 UCI Track Cycling World Cup

2nd Omnium (Round 1, Minsk)
3rd Team pursuit (Round 1, Minsk)

UEC European Track Championships

3rd Team pursuit

2020
UCI World Championships

2nd Omnium
3rd Madison

2019–20 UCI Track Cycling World Cup

2nd Omnium (Round 6, Milton)

2021
UCI World Championships

1st Elimination
2nd Team pursuit

UEC European Track Championships

2nd Elimination
2nd Team pursuit

3rd Madison, National Track Championships

2022
2nd Team pursuit, UEC European Track Championships

2023
2nd Team pursuit, UEC European Track Championships

2024
1st Team pursuit, UEC European Track Championships
3rd Team pursuit, UCI World Championships
