= 2021 UCI Track Cycling World Championships =

Cycling world championships

- Venue: Roubaix, France
- Date: 20–24 October
- Velodrome: Velodrome Couvert Regional Jean-Stablinski
- Events: 22

The 2021 UCI Track Cycling World Championships were held from 20 to 24 October 2021 at the Velodrome Couvert Regional Jean-Stablinski in Roubaix, France. The championships were originally scheduled to be held in Ashgabat, Turkmenistan. The elimination race was introduced for the first time in the history of World Championships.

== Bidding ==
Turkmenistan showed their interest in hosting the championships at the Opening Ceremony of the Olympic Council of Asia General Assembly in September 2015. The Central Asian country's President Gurbanguly Berdimuhamedov expressed his intention in which he reiterated his aim to use sport to raise the profile of the nation. Berdimuhamedov described the proposal as "fully in accord" with the plans of the nation, adding that the country has "all the necessary conditions". Igor Makarov, the Ashgabat-born president of the Russian Cycling Federation, outlined the attractions of the Ashgabat Sports Complex Velodrome. The velodrome is among the largest velodromes in the world with room for 6000 spectators. He appealed directly to the president to consider bidding for the event. The championships would represent the largest-profile sporting event ever held in Turkmenistan. President of the Union Cycliste Internationale (UCI) David Lappartient called the Ashgabat Velodrome "one of the most beautiful in the world" and noted that it was thanks to this structure that it was decided to grant Turkmenistan the right to host the World Track Cycling Championship in 2021.

In June 2021 the UCI announced that the championships would be moved to a different venue. Roubaix was announced as the new venue in August 2021.

== Schedule ==
22 events were held.

All times are local (UTC+2).

Date	Time	Event
20 October	13:00	Women's team pursuit qualifying
20 October	13:00	Men's team pursuit qualifying
20 October	13:00	Women's scratch qualifying
20 October	18:30	Women's team sprint qualifying
20 October	18:30	Men's team sprint qualifying
20 October	18:30	Women's scratch final
20 October	18:30	Women's team sprint first round
20 October	18:30	Men's team sprint first round
20 October	18:30	Men's team pursuit first round
20 October	18:30	Women's team sprint final
20 October	18:30	Men's team sprint final
21 October	13:00	Men's keirin first round, repechage, second round
21 October	13:00	Women's sprint qualifying, 1/16, 1/8 final
21 October	13:00	Men's scratch qualifying
21 October	18:30	Women's team pursuit first round
21 October	18:30	Women's sprint 1/4 final
21 October	18:30	Men's team pursuit final
21 October	18:30	Men's scratch final
21 October	18:30	Men's keirin final
21 October	18:30	Women's team pursuit final
21 October	18:30	Women's elimination final
22 October	13:00	Women's omnium points race, scratch, tempo race
22 October	13:00	Men's time trial qualifying
22 October	13:00	Men's points race qualifying
22 October	13:00	Men's individual pursuit qualifying
22 October	18:30	Men's points race
22 October	18:30	Women's sprint semifinals
22 October	18:30	Women's omnium, elimination
22 October	18:30	Men's time trial final
22 October	18:30	Men's individual pursuit final
22 October	18:30	Women's sprint final
22 October	18:30	Women's omnium, Points race

Date	Time	Event
23 October	10:00	Men's omnium points race, scratch, tempo race
23 October	10:00	Women's time trial qualifying
23 October	10:00	Women's madison qualifying
23 October	10:00	Men's sprint qualifying, 1/16, 1/8 final
23 October	10:00	Men's omnium scratch, tempo race
23 October	10:00	Women's individual pursuit qualifying
23 October	17:30	Women's time trial final
23 October	17:30	Men's sprint 1/4 final
23 October	17:30	Women's madison
23 October	17:30	Men's omnium, elimination
23 October	17:30	Men's sprint 1/4 final
23 October	17:30	Women's individual pursuit final
23 October	17:30	Men's omnium, Points race
24 October	13:00	Women's points race qualifying
24 October	13:00	Men's madison qualifying
24 October	13:00	Men's sprint semifinals
24 October	13:00	Men's elimination qualifying
24 October	13:00	Women's keirin, first round, repechage
24 October	13:48	Women's points race
24 October	13:48	Men's sprint finals
24 October	13:48	Women's keirin, second round
24 October	13:48	Men's madison
24 October	13:48	Women's keirin finals
24 October	13:48	Men's elimination

== Medal summary ==
=== Medal table ===
* Host nation (France)

Rank	Nation	Gold	Silver	Bronze	Total
1	Germany	6	2	3	11
2	Netherlands	5	3	2	10
3	Italy	4	3	3	10
4	France*	2	3	1	6
5	Great Britain	2	1	5	8
6	Belgium	1	4	1	6
7	United States	1	0	2	3
8	Denmark	1	0	0	1
9	Russian Cycling Federation	0	2	4	6
10	Japan	0	1	0	1
10	New Zealand	0	1	0	1
10	Portugal	0	1	0	1
10	Trinidad and Tobago	0	1	0	1
14	Canada	0	0	1	1
Totals (14 entries)		22	22	22	66

=== Men ===
Event	Gold	Silver	Bronze
1 km time trial	Jeffrey Hoogland; Netherlands	Nicholas Paul; Trinidad and Tobago	Joachim Eilers; Germany
Individual pursuit	Ashton Lambie; United States	Jonathan Milan; Italy	Filippo Ganna; Italy
Team pursuit	Italy; Liam Bertazzo; Simone Consonni; Filippo Ganna; Jonathan Milan; Francesco Lamon	France; Thomas Boudat; Thomas Denis; Valentin Tabellion; Benjamin Thomas	Great Britain; Ethan Hayter; Ethan Vernon; Charlie Tanfield; Oliver Wood; Kian Emadi
Sprint	Harrie Lavreysen; Netherlands	Jeffrey Hoogland; Netherlands	Sébastien Vigier; France
Team sprint	Netherlands; Roy van den Berg; Harrie Lavreysen; Jeffrey Hoogland	France; Florian Grengbo; Sébastien Vigier; Rayan Helal	Germany; Nik Schröter; Stefan Bötticher; Joachim Eilers; Marc Jurczyk
Keirin	Harrie Lavreysen; Netherlands	Jeffrey Hoogland; Netherlands	Mikhail Iakovlev; Russian Cycling Federation
Scratch	Donavan Grondin; France	Tuur Dens; Belgium	Rhys Britton; Great Britain
Points race	Benjamin Thomas; France	Kenny De Ketele; Belgium	Vincent Hoppezak; Netherlands
Elimination race	Elia Viviani; Italy	Iúri Leitão; Portugal	Sergey Rostovtsev; Russian Cycling Federation
Madison	Denmark; Lasse Norman Hansen; Michael Mørkøv	Italy; Simone Consonni; Michele Scartezzini	Belgium; Kenny De Ketele; Robbe Ghys
Omnium	Ethan Hayter; Great Britain	Aaron Gate; New Zealand	Elia Viviani; Italy

=== Women ===
Event	Gold	Silver	Bronze
500 m time trial	Lea Friedrich; Germany	Anastasia Voynova; Russian Cycling Federation	Daria Shmeleva; Russian Cycling Federation
Individual pursuit	Lisa Brennauer; Germany	Franziska Brauße; Germany	Mieke Kröger; Germany
Team pursuit	Germany; Franziska Brauße; Lisa Brennauer; Mieke Kröger; Laura Süßemilch	Italy; Elisa Balsamo; Martina Alzini; Chiara Consonni; Martina Fidanza; Letizia Paternoster	Great Britain; Katie Archibald; Megan Barker; Neah Evans; Josie Knight
Sprint	Emma Hinze; Germany	Lea Friedrich; Germany	Kelsey Mitchell; Canada
Team sprint	Germany; Lea Friedrich; Pauline Grabosch; Emma Hinze	Russian Cycling Federation; Natalia Antonova; Daria Shmeleva; Yana Tyshchenko; Anastasia Voynova	Great Britain; Sophie Capewell; Blaine Ridge-Davis; Milly Tanner; Lauren Bate
Keirin	Lea Friedrich; Germany	Mina Sato; Japan	Yana Tyshchenko; Russian Cycling Federation
Scratch	Martina Fidanza; Italy	Maike van der Duin; Netherlands	Jennifer Valente; United States
Points race	Lotte Kopecky; Belgium	Katie Archibald; Great Britain	Kirsten Wild; Netherlands
Elimination	Letizia Paternoster; Italy	Lotte Kopecky; Belgium	Jennifer Valente; United States
Madison	Netherlands; Amy Pieters; Kirsten Wild	France; Clara Copponi; Marie Le Net	Great Britain; Katie Archibald; Neah Evans
Omnium	Katie Archibald; Great Britain	Lotte Kopecky; Belgium	Elisa Balsamo; Italy

- Shaded events are non-Olympic
