= Lena Charlotte Reißner =

German cyclist (born 2000)

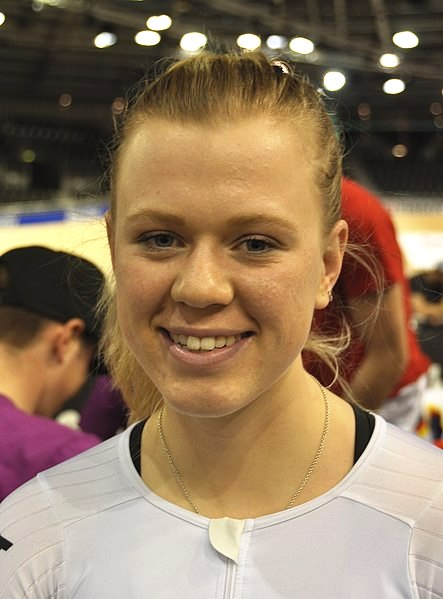
- Reißner in 2020

Personal information
- Born: 14 November 2000 (age 25) Gera, Germany

Cycling career
- Sport: Cycling
- Current team: LKT Team
- Disciplines: Road; Track
- Role: Rider

Amateur teams
- 2019–2021: d.velop
- 2023: One World Team Women

Professional team
- 2022: IBCT
- 2024–: LKT Team
Medal record
Women's track cycling
Representing Germany
European Championships
Gold medal – first place	2021 Grenchen	Team pursuit
Bronze medal – third place	2024 Apeldoorn	Team pursuit
Bronze medal – third place	2026 Konya	Scratch

Lena Charlotte Reißner (born 14 November 2000) is a German professional racing cyclist, who currently rides for UCI Women's Continental Team LKT Team. She won a gold medal in the team pursuit at the 2021 UEC European Track Championships.
