= Kelly Murphy (cyclist) =

Irish cyclist (born 1989)

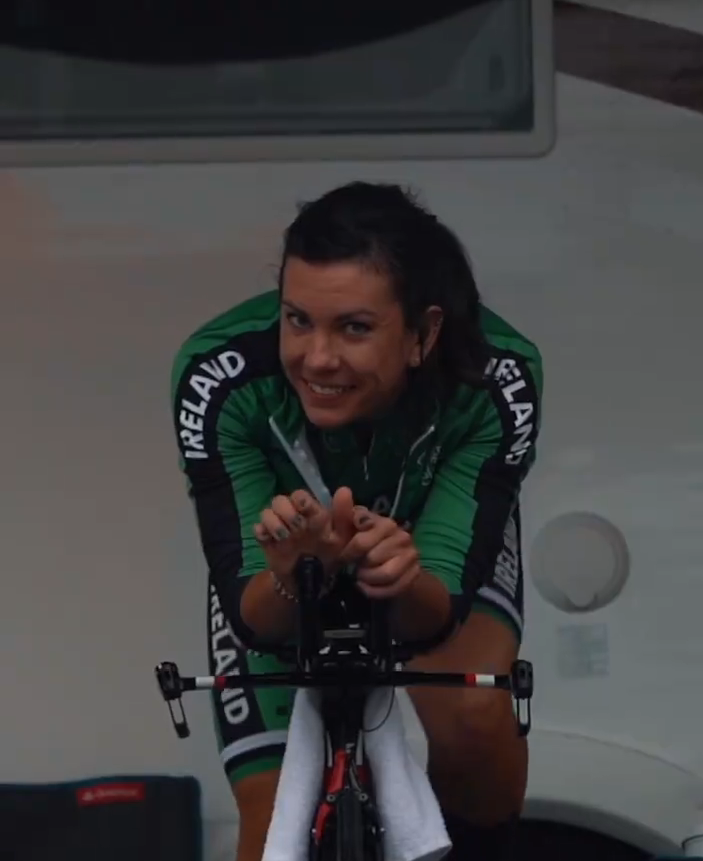
- Murphy in 2019

Personal information
- Born: 3 November 1989 (age 36) Hillingdon, London
- Height: 5 ft 7 in (170 cm)
- Weight: 64 kg (141 lb)

Cycling career
- Sport: Cycling
- Disciplines: Road; Track
- Role: Rider
- Rider type: Pursuit, Time Trial

Amateur teams
- 2016: Boot Out Breast Cancer Cycling Club
- 2017: Team Ford EcoBoost
- 2018: Chapter 2
- 2019–2020: Storey Racing

Professional teams
- 2021: Team Rupelcleaning–Champion Lubricants
- 2023: AWOL O'Shea
- 2024: Doltcini O'Shea
Medal record
Women's track cycling
Representing Ireland
European Championships
Bronze medal – third place	2021 Grenchen	Team pursuit

Kelly Murphy OLY (born 3 November 1989) is an Irish racing cyclist, who rode for UCI Women's Continental Team Team Rupelcleaning–Champion Lubricants. She was elite women's national champion in the time trial event in 2018 & 2019 and represented Ireland in this event at the European and World Championships in these same years. At the 2019 European Road Championships, Murphy finished 10th in the TT and in doing so became the first Irish woman to place within the top 10 at any international road event.

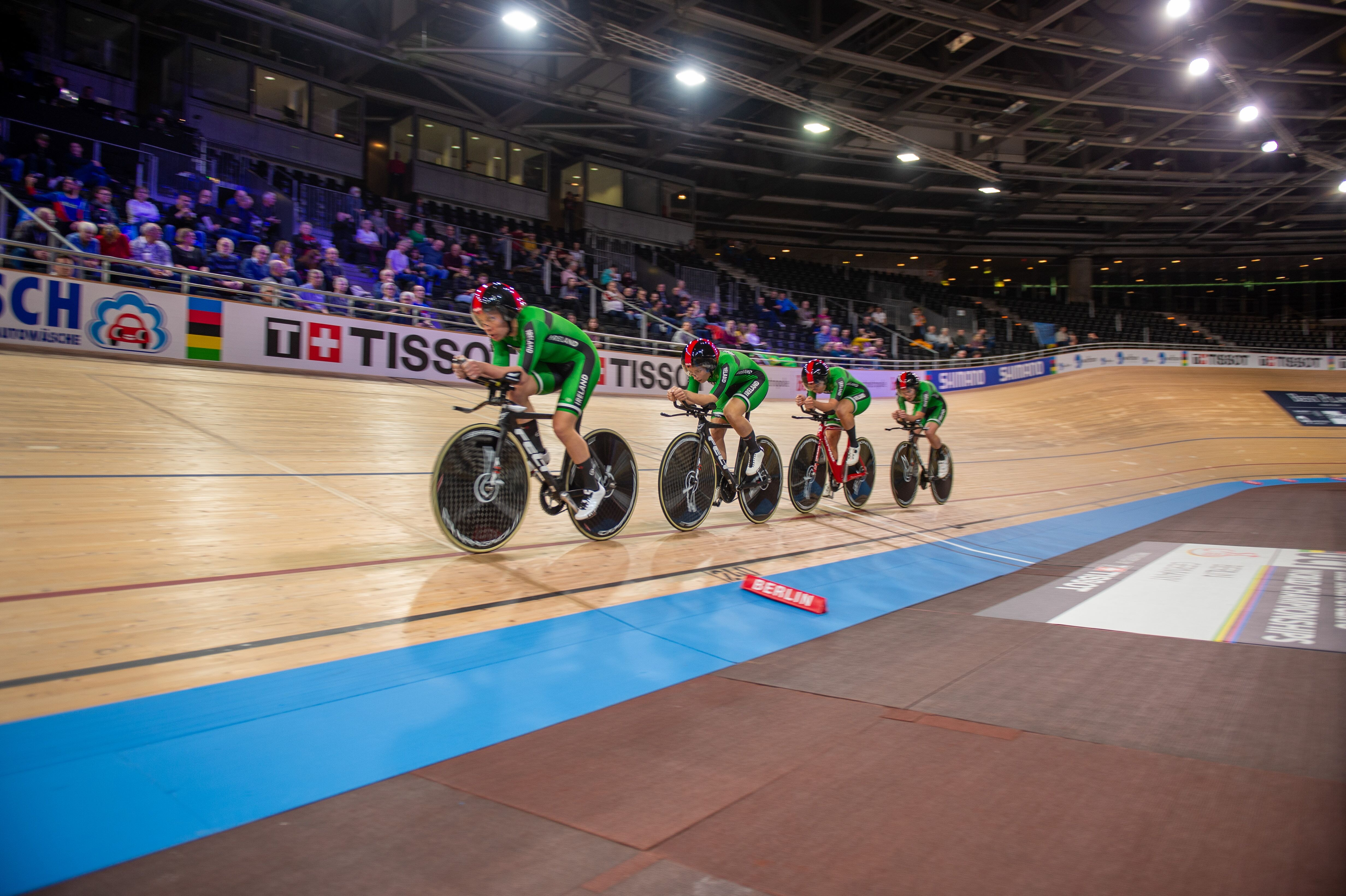
Irish women's team pursuit at 2020 UCI Track World Championships, Berlin

Murphy also represents Ireland on the track, most notably for women's team pursuit. Together with Mia Griffin, Lara Gillespie and Alice Sharpe, Murphy was part of the line up that set a new Irish record of 4:21.368 at the 2020 UCI Track Cycling World Championships in Berlin, finishing 8th place in the process. The same quartet came close to this time again at the 2021 UCI Track Cycling Nations Cup in St. Petersburg, where they won the gold medal against Russia, becoming the first women's team pursuit squad to medal at an international event. Later in that same competition, Murphy rode in the women's individual pursuit and set a new national record of 3:29.510 in qualifying, then went on to win a second gold against Russia in the medal ride-off.

Before turning to cycling full-time in 2018, Murphy completed a doctoral degree in Brain Imaging & Cognitive Neuroscience at Aston University, her PhD thesis is entitled: "On the Neural Basis of Reading: Using Interactions Between Semantics and Phonology to Dissociate Typical, Deviant and Delayed Reading with Functional Magnetic Resonance Imaging and Magnetoencephalography"
