= Mia Griffin =

Irish cyclist (born 1998)

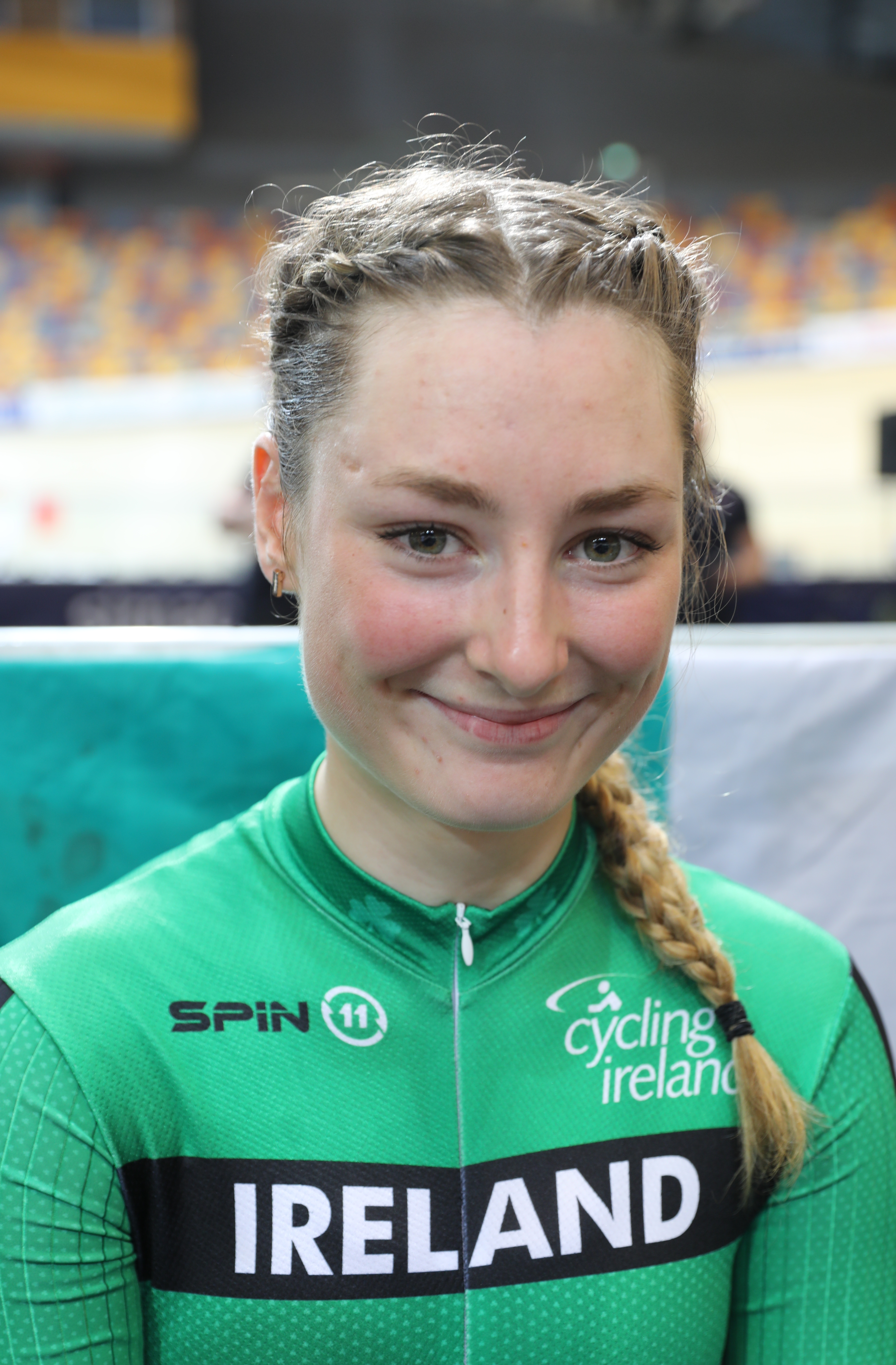
- Griffin in 2019

Personal information
- Full name: Mia Griffin
- Born: 30 December 1998 (age 27)

Cycling career
- Sport: Cycling
- Current team: Roland Le Dévoluy
- Disciplines: Road; Track
- Role: Rider

Amateur teams
- 2018: VC Eriu
- 2019: TC Racing
- 2020: Illi-Bikes Cycling Team

Professional teams
- 2021: Team Rupelcleaning–Champion Lubricants
- 2022: IBCT
- 2023: Israel Premier Tech Roland
- 2024: DAS–Hutchinson–Brother–UK
- 2025: Roland Le Dévoluy
Medal record
Women's track cycling
Representing Ireland
European Championships
Bronze medal – third place	2021 Grenchen	Team pursuit

Mia Griffin (born 30 December 1998) is an Irish professional racing cyclist, who currently rides for UCI Women's WorldTeam Roland Le Dévoluy. She rode in the women's team pursuit event at the 2020 UCI Track Cycling World Championships in Berlin, Germany.

She represented Ireland in the Team Pursuit in the 2024 Olympics, finishing in 9th place in a new Irish National Record time.

She became the first Irish winner of Rás na mBan in 11 years, when she won the 2024 edition in her home county of Kilkenny.

== Results ==
European Championships Results
Year	Points Race	Elimination	Scratch	Team Pursuit	Individual Pursuit	Madison
2021	—	18th	—	3rd place, bronze medalist(s)	8th	—
2022	9th	—	—	6th	—	9th
2023	9th	10th	—	5th	—	—
2024	—	16th	10th	—	—	—
2025	—	—	7th	—	—	

== Media career ==
Griffin and her family competed in series 4 of Ireland's Fittest Family they were coached by Alan Quinlan they were eliminated in the second round
