= Jasmin Liechti =

Swiss cyclist

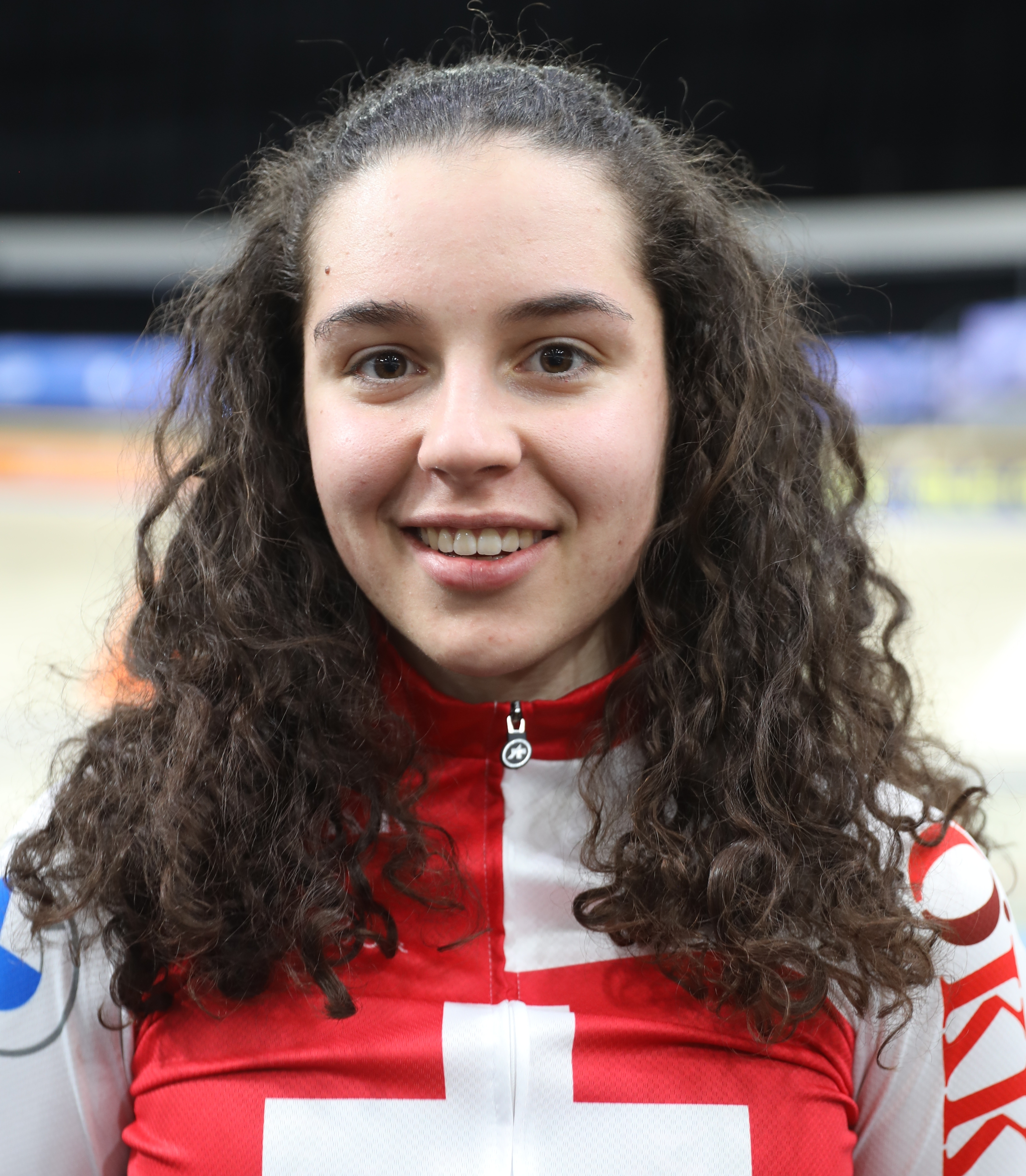
- Liechti in 2024

Personal information
- Born: 9 October 2002 (age 24)

Cycling career
- Sport: Cycling
- Current team: WCC Team
- Disciplines: Road; Track
- Role: Rider
- Rider type: Time trialist

Professional teams
- 2022: WCC Team (stagiaire)
- 2023–: WCC Team
Medal record
Representing Switzerland
Women's road bicycle racing
World Championships
Silver medal – second place	2024 Zurich	Under-23 time trial
Bronze medal – third place	2025 Kigali	Mixed team relay
European Championships
Silver medal – second place	2022 Anadia	Under-23 team time trial
Bronze medal – third place	2025 Guilherand-Granges	Mixed team relay

Jasmin Liechti (born 9 October 2002) is a Swiss professional racing cyclist, who currently rides for UCI Women's Continental Team WCC Team. In 2024, she won the silver medal in the under-23 time trial at the UCI Road World Championships.

== Major results ==
2022
2nd Mixed relay, UEC European Under-23 Road Championships
3rd Time trial, National Under-23 Road Championships
2023
National Under-23 Road Championships

4th Road race
5th Time trial

2024
National Under-23 Road Championships

1st Time trial
2nd Road race

2nd Time trial, UCI Road World Under-23 Championships
2nd Team pursuit, UEC European Under-23 Track Championships
4th Time trial, UEC European Under-23 Road Championships
2026
3rd Team relay, UCI Road World Championships
