= Karolina Karasiewicz =

Polish cyclist (born 1992)

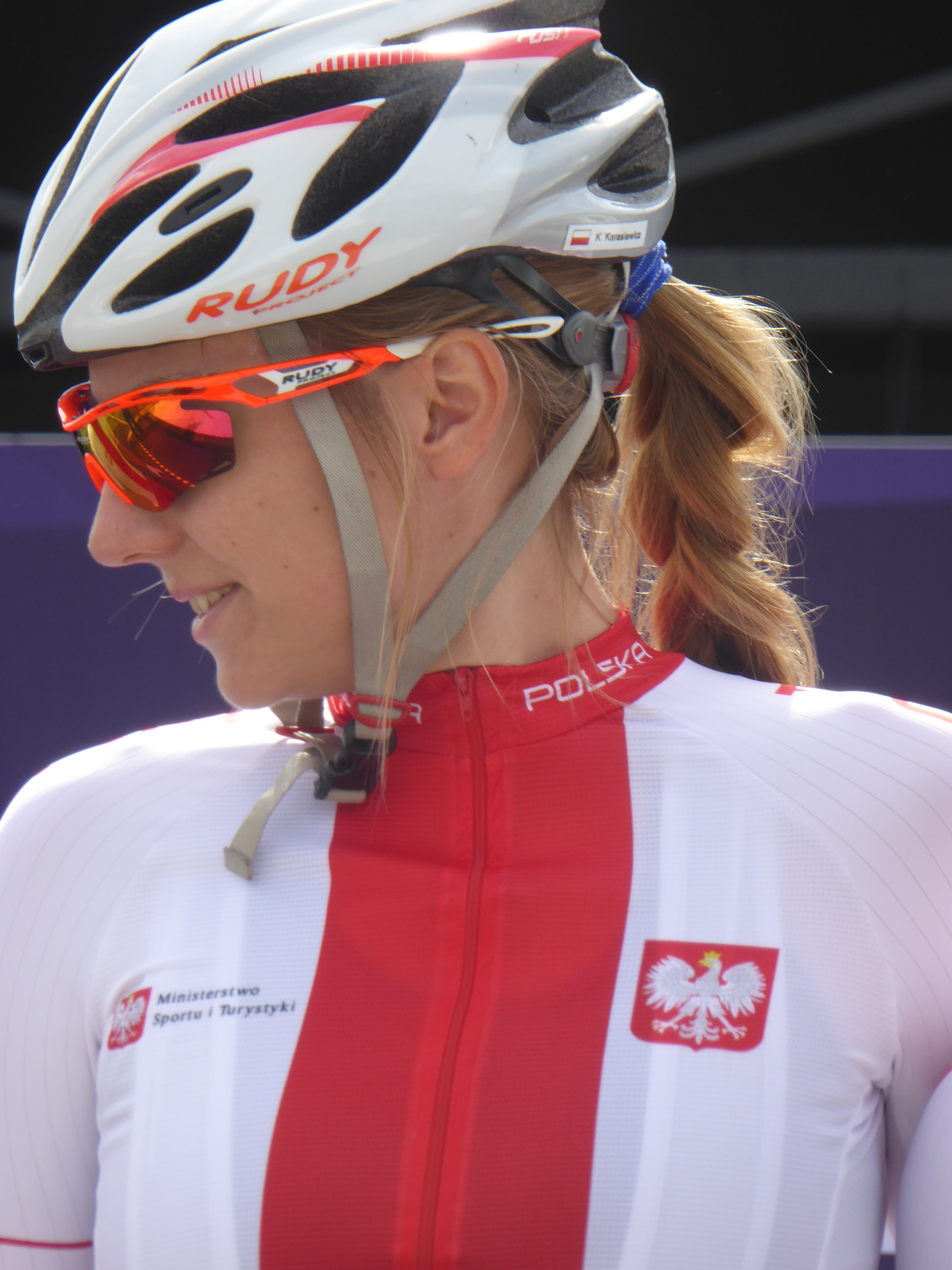
- Karasiewicz at the 2018 European Road Championships

Personal information
- Born: 23 July 1992 (age 34) Łódź, Poland

Cycling career
- Sport: Cycling
- Role: Rider
Medal record
Women's track cycling
Representing Poland
European Games
Bronze medal – third place	2019 Minsk	Team pursuit
European Championships
Bronze medal – third place	2020 Plovdiv	Points race

Karolina Karasiewicz (born 23 July 1992) is a Polish professional racing cyclist. In June 2017, she won the Polish National Road Race Championships. In June 2019, at the European Games in Minsk, Karasiewicz won a bronze medal in the team pursuit event.
