= Alice Sharpe =

Irish cyclist

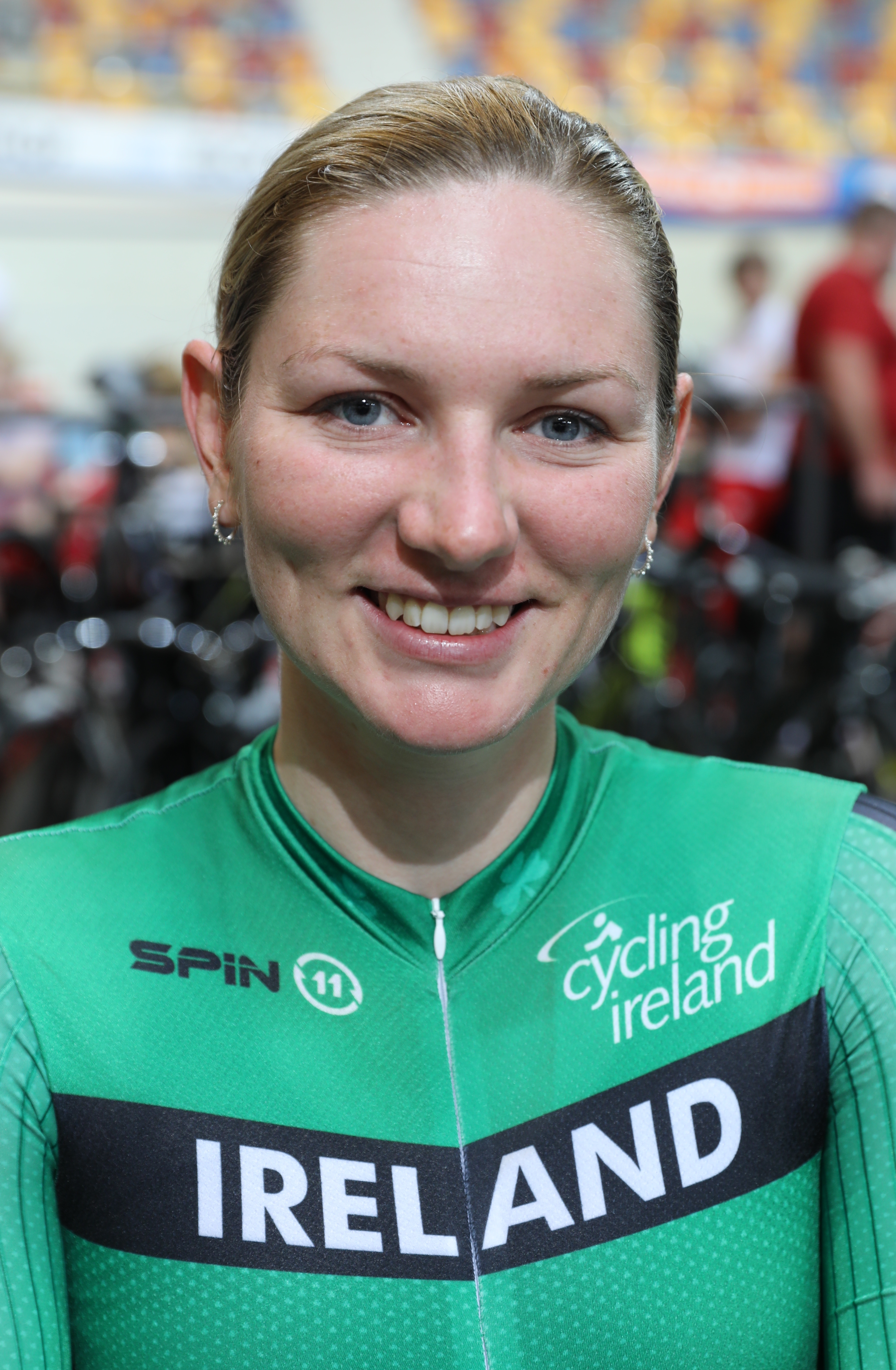
- Sharpe in 2019

Personal information
- Full name: Alice Louise Sharpe

Cycling career
- Sport: Cycling
- Disciplines: Road; Track
- Role: Rider

Amateur teams
- 2016: SunSport Velo
- 2017–2018: NCC Group–Kuota–Torelli

Professional teams
- 2019: WCC Team
- 2020: Ciclotel
- 2021: Team Rupelcleaning–Champion Lubricants
- 2022: IBCT
- 2023: Israel Premier Tech Roland
- 2024: DAS–Hutchinson–Brother–UK
- 2025: DAS–Hutchinson
Medal record
Representing Ireland
Women's track cycling
European Championships
Bronze medal – third place	2021 Grenchen	Team pursuit
Women's para cycling
Road World Championships
Silver medal – second place	2026 Huntsville	Road Race (B)
Silver medal – second place	2026 Huntsville	Time trial (B)
Track World Championships
Bronze medal – third place	2026 Apeldoorn	Pursuit (B)
European Road Championships
Silver medal – second place	2026 Maniago	Road Race

Alice Louise Sharpe is an Irish racing cyclist and para cyclist guide, who competed in the Women's team pursuit at the 2024 Summer Olympics for Ireland and she competes alongside para cyclist Sinead Greenan and won two Silver at the 2026 World Championships.

== Major results ==
2018
3rd Road race, National Road Championships
2019
1st Road race, National Road Championships
7th Overall Kreiz Breizh Elites Dames
2022
1st Road race, National Road Championships
8th SwissEver GP Cham-Hagendorn
10th Vuelta a la Comunitat Valenciana Feminas
2023
4th Road race, National Road Championships
