= Michelle Andres =

Swiss cyclist

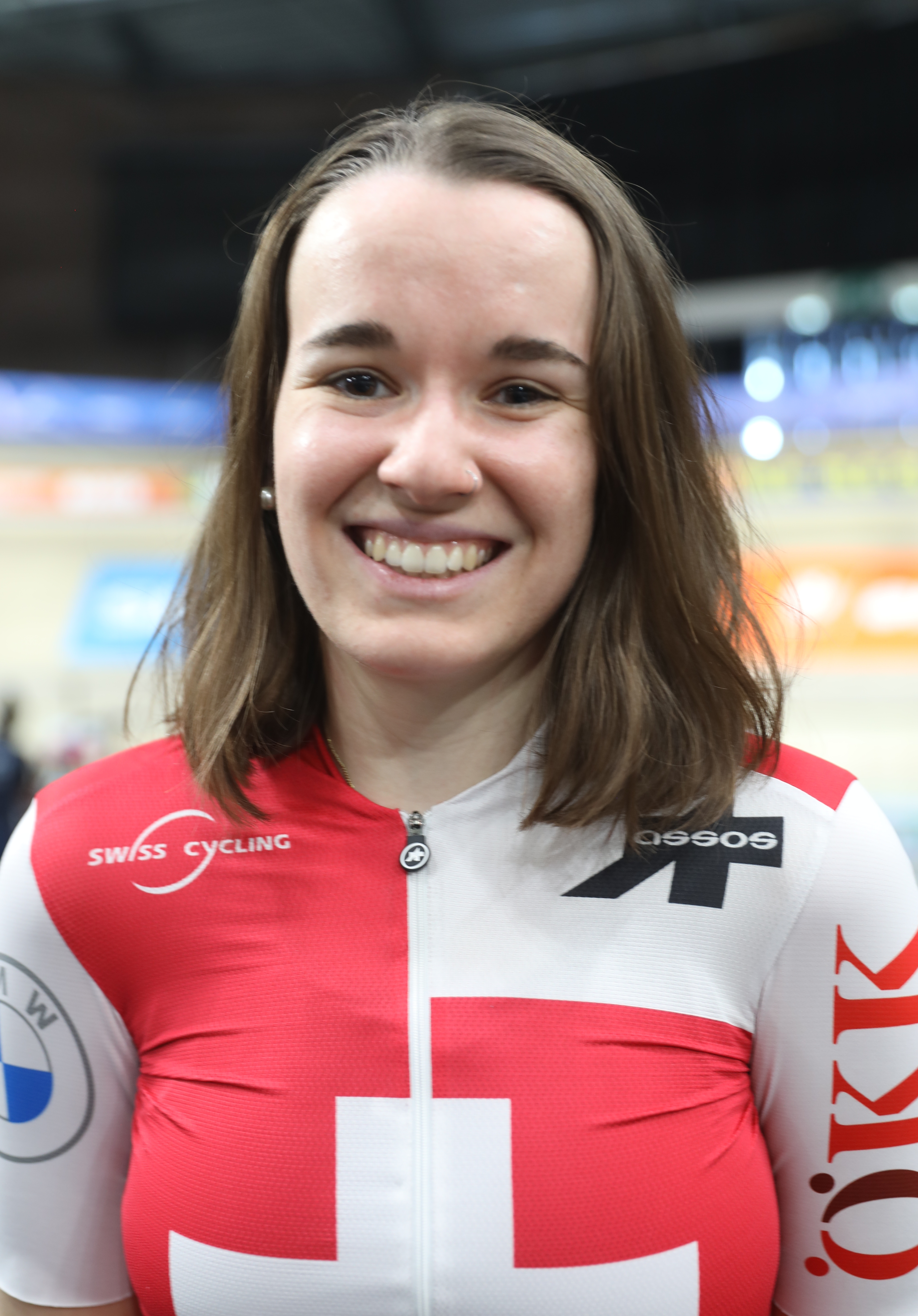
- Andres in 2024

Personal information
- Born: 26 May 1997 (age 29) Baden, Switzerland

Cycling career
- Sport: Cycling
- Disciplines: Track; Road

Amateur teams
- 2019–20: Andy Schleck Cycles–Immo Losch
- 2023: Team JS.dk
- 2024: Team Sydbank Bach Advokater

Professional team
- 2021–2022: Andy Schleck–CP NVST–Immo Losch

Michelle Andres (born 26 May 1997) is a Swiss cyclist. She competed in the women's madison event at the 2024 Summer Olympics.

== Major results ==
=== Road ===
2014
National Junior Road Championships

2nd Time trial
8th Road race

7th Time trial, European Road Championships
