= Wiktoria Pikulik =

Polish cyclist (born 1998)

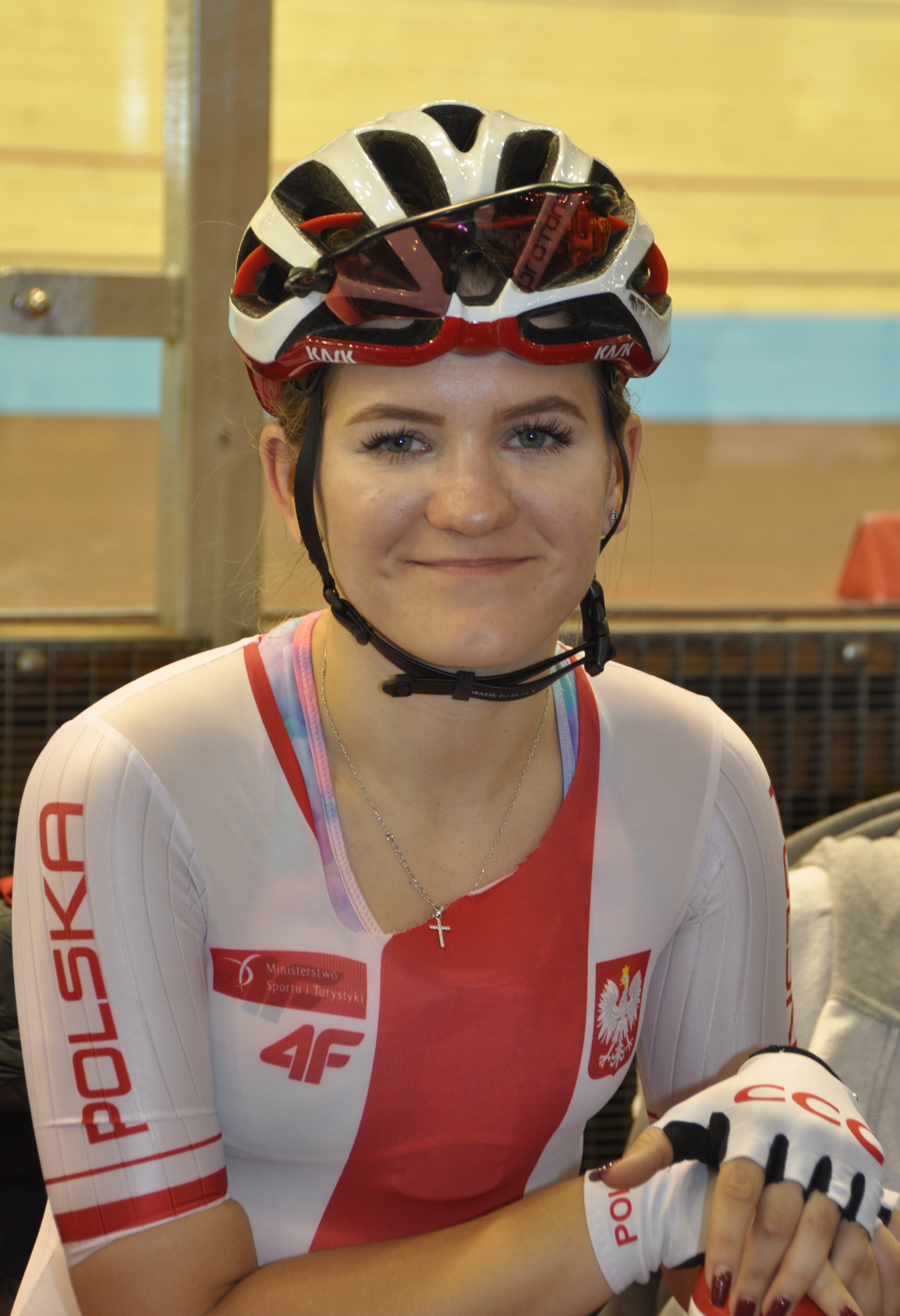
- Pikulik in 2018

Personal information
- Born: 15 June 1998 (age 28) Darłowo, Poland

Cycling career
- Sport: Cycling
- Current team: Human Powered Health
- Disciplines: Track; Road
- Role: Rider

Professional teams
- 2022–2023: ATOM Deweloper Posciellux.pl Wrocław
- 2024–: Human Powered Health

Wiktoria Pikulik (born 15 June 1998) is a Polish professional racing cyclist, who currently rides for UCI Women's WorldTeam Human Powered Health. In 2019, she became a three-time national track cycling champion, winning the under-23 omnium, team pursuit and Madison events. She also rode in the women's madison event at the 2019 UEC European Track Championships, with her sister Daria, securing qualification points for the 2020 Summer Olympics in Tokyo.
