= Geography of Shanghai =

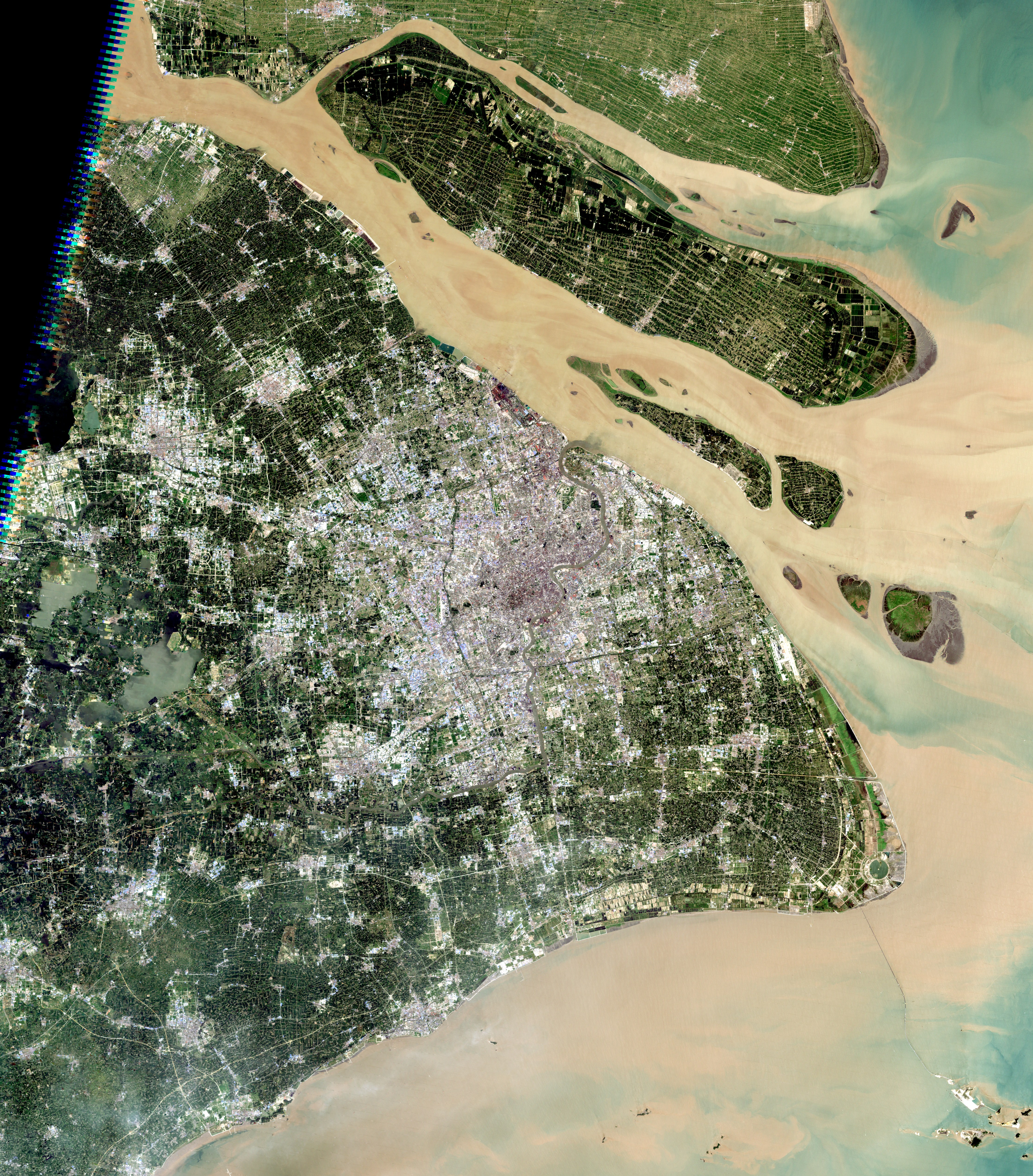
Geography of Shanghai
Continent	Asia
Location	Yangtze River Delta
Coordinates	31°12′N 121°30′E
Area	Total: 6,340 km^{2} (2,450 sq mi): Land: 6,218 km^{2} (2,401 sq mi); Water: 121 km^{2} (47 sq mi)
Average elevation	4 m (13 ft) above sea level

The geography of Shanghai is characterised by its location on the Yangtze River Delta on China's east coast and its proximity to the Pacific Ocean via the East China Sea. The city is centred on the Huangpu River, a tributary of the Yangtze River, and extends outwards in all directions, with the suburbs and satellite towns reaching east to the East China Sea, north and west to Jiangsu province, and south to Zhejiang province over Hangzhou Bay.

The vast majority of Shanghai's land area is flat, apart from a few hills in the southwest corner, due to its location on the alluvial plain of the Yangtze's river delta. The city has many rivers and lakes and is known for its rich water resources, and thanks to its coastal, riverside location and warm climate ensuring ice-free waters, provides easy access to China's interior, resulting in Shanghai being the world's largest port.

== Statistics ==
=== Location ===
Shanghai is located in the middle of China's east coast, near the mouth of the Yangtze River, being one of the core cities in the Yangtze River Delta region and one of the coastal cities in China. It is bordered by the Yangtze River to the north, the East China Sea to the east, Hangzhou Bay to the south, and Jiangsu and Zhejiang Provinces to the west. The city is roughly equidistant to Beijing and Hong Kong, and is located at 31°12′N 121°30′E, roughly the same latitude as San Diego, New Orleans, Bermuda, Marrakesh, Cairo, Jerusalem, and Lahore. Cities within mainland China that lie on approximately the same longitude include Fuxin, Jinzhou, Dalian, Yantai, Ningbo, and Taizhou (Zhejiang). The municipality lies about due north of Taipei and Manila.

- Latitude: 30° 42' to 31° 52' N
- Longitude: 120° 52' to 121° 58' E

=== Area ===
- Direct-administered municipality:
  - Total: 6,340.5 km^{2} (2,448.1 sq mi)
  - Land: 6,218.65 km^{2} (2,401.03 sq mi)
  - Water: 121.85 km^{2} (47.05 sq mi)

Area comparative
- Australia comparative: approximately 1/11 the size of Tasmania
- Canada comparative: approximately 1/10 larger than Prince Edward Island
- United States comparative: slightly smaller than Delaware
- EU comparative: approximately 2 1/2 times the size of Luxembourg or slightly more than 1/5 the size of Belgium

=== Waterways ===
Shanghai contains 53.1 km (33.0 mi) of rivers and streams and is part of the Lake Tai drainage area. Suzhou Creek is 125 km (78 mi) long and has an average width of 70 to 80 meters, while the Huangpu River is 80 km (50 mi) long and is around 400 meters wide.

Shanghai's development of the deep-water port of Yangshan in Zhejiang was made necessary by the increasing size of container ships but also the silting of the Yangtze, which narrows to less than 20 meters (66 ft) as far out as 45 miles (70 km) from Hengsha.

=== Islands ===
The Municipality of Shanghai administers a number of islands around its peninsula, including most of Chongming Island (1,267 km^{2} or 489 sq mi), the second-largest island of mainland China. Chongming, Changxing (88.54 km^{2} or 34.19 sq mi), and Hengsha (55.74 km^{2} or 21.52 sq mi) comprise the permanently inhabited islands of Shanghai, while the city's 19 uninhabited islands covered 226.27 km^{2} (87.36 sq mi) in 2006, with a total coastline of 309 kilometers (192 mi).

Most of Shanghai's islands are small alluvial islands (沙) created by the natural deposition of vast amounts of silt by the Yangtze River. The major islands (岛) of Chongming, Changxing, and Hengsha in Chongming County were formed in this way, as were the shoals of Jiuduansha (114.6 km^{2} or 44.2 sq mi) off of Pudong. The natural expansion of these islands has been greatly accelerated by reclamation projects, with Chongming more than doubling in size between 1950 and 2010. Unlike the islands of Chongming County, Jiuduansha was expanded and protected as an uninhabited nature reserve to make up for the wetlands destroyed by the creation of Pudong International Airport. It is an important spawning ground for Shanghai's hairy crab community, as well as other maritime and avian species. A few islands in Hangzhou Bay off Jinshan District are rocky islands (also 岛). Dajinshan, Xiaojinshan, and Fushan are municipal nature reserves. The peak of Dajinshan is the highest point in the Municipality of Shanghai, with altitude of 103.4 meters (339 ft).

Shanghai does not administer the islands of Greater and Lesser Yangshan, the site of the Port of Shanghai's Yangshan Deep-Water Port. Instead, the belong to Zhejiang Province, despite being linked via the Donghai Bridge to Pudong. Similarly, Chongming's absorption of Jiangsu's Yonglongsha shoal produced a long but narrow exclave of that province on its northern shore.

== Climate ==
Shanghai

Climate chart (precipitation, max. and min. temperature)
J	F	M	A	M	J	J	A	S	O	N	D
72 8 1	65 10 3	97 14 6	84 20 12	91 25 17	225 28 22	163 33 26	226 32 25	132 28 21	70 23 16	61 17 10	50 11 3
- █ Average max. and min. temperatures in °C
- █ Precipitation totals in mm
- Source: The National Centers for Environmental Information (NCEI)
Imperial conversion
J	F	M	A	M	J	J	A	S	O	N	D
2.8 46 34	2.6 50 37	3.8 57 43	3.3 68 54	3.6 77 63	8.9 82 72	6.4 91 79	8.9 90 77	5.2 82 70	2.8 73 61	2.4 63 50	2 52 37
- █ Average max. and min. temperatures in °F
- █ Precipitation totals in inches

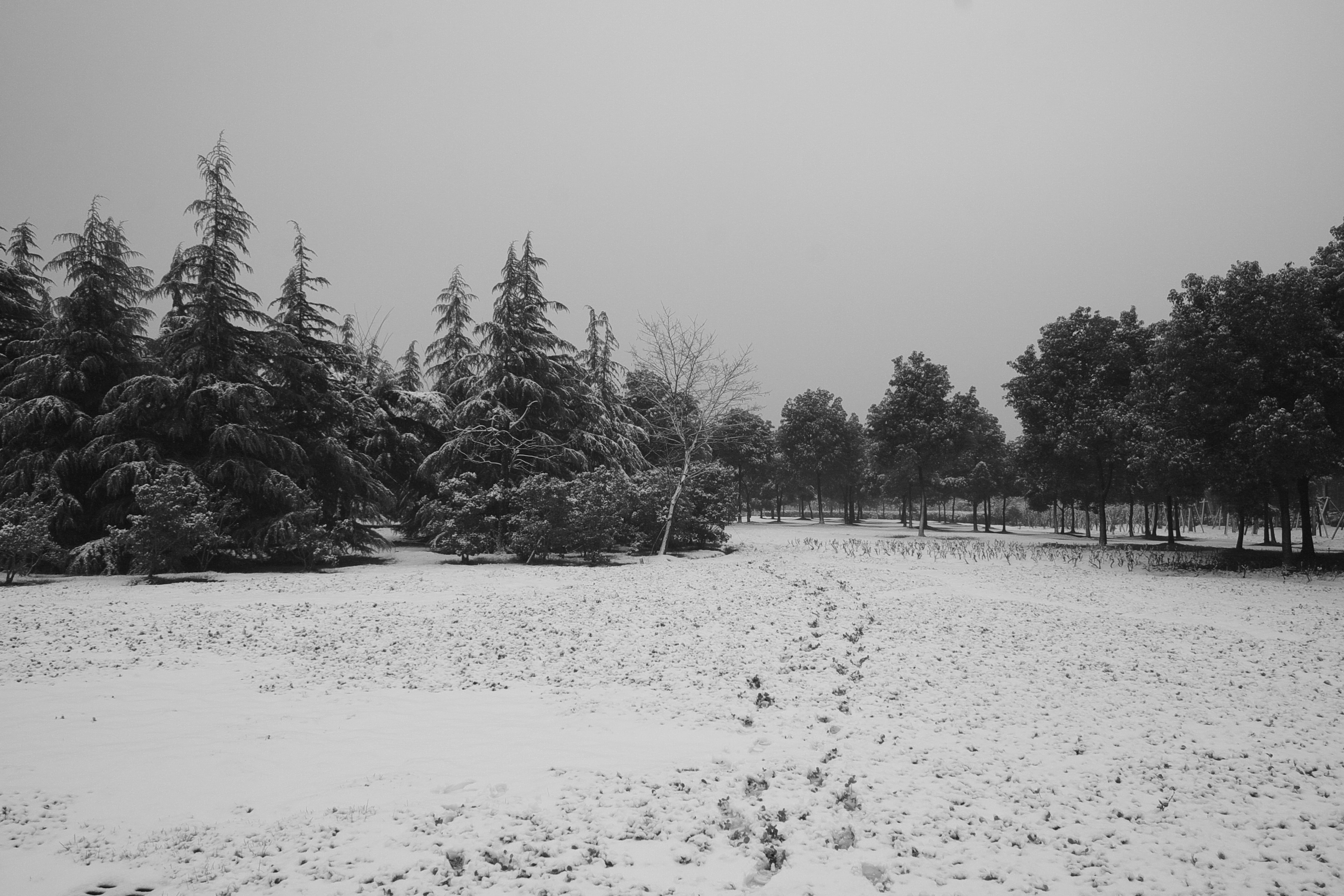
A rare snowfall in Shanghai

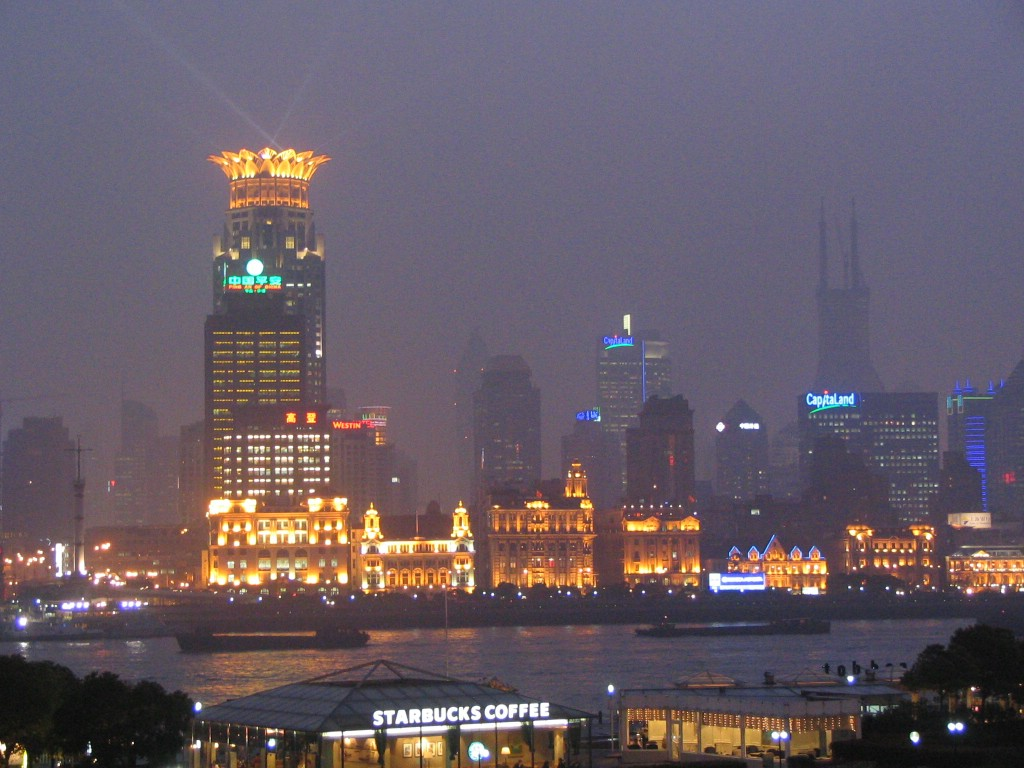
The Bund and the skyline behind it during a rainy evening

Shanghai has a humid subtropical climate (Köppen climate classification Cfa) and experiences four distinct seasons. In winter, cold northerly winds from Siberia can cause nighttime temperatures to drop below freezing, and although not usually associated with snow, the city can receive one or two days of snowfall per year. In contrast, and in spite of being the peak tourist season, summer in Shanghai is very warm and humid, with occasional downpours or freak thunderstorms. The city is also susceptible to typhoons, none of which in recent years has caused considerable damage. The most pleasant seasons are Spring, although changeable, and Autumn, which is generally sunny and dry.

Climate statistics of 2013:

- Average annual temperature: 17.6 °C (63.7 °F)
- Highest recorded air temperature: 39.9 °C (103.8 °F)
- Lowest recorded air temperature: −4.2 °C (24.4 °F)
- Annual hours of sunshine: 1,885.9
- Evaporation: 1,120.5 mm (44.1 in)
- Precipitation: 1,173.4 mm (46.2 in)
- Annual rainy days: 111
- Frost-free period: 259 days

Climate data for Shanghai (Xujiahui), elevation 5 m (16 ft), (1991–2020 normals, extremes 1951–present)
Month	Jan	Feb	Mar	Apr	May	Jun	Jul	Aug	Sep	Oct	Nov	Dec	Year
Record high °C (°F)	21.6 (70.9)	27.0 (80.6)	29.5 (85.1)	33.9 (93.0)	36.7 (98.1)	38.4 (101.1)	40.9 (105.6)	40.8 (105.4)	38.2 (100.8)	36.0 (96.8)	28.5 (83.3)	23.4 (74.1)	40.9 (105.6)
Mean daily maximum °C (°F)	8.7 (47.7)	10.7 (51.3)	14.9 (58.8)	20.9 (69.6)	25.8 (78.4)	28.6 (83.5)	33.2 (91.8)	32.6 (90.7)	28.7 (83.7)	23.5 (74.3)	17.8 (64.0)	11.3 (52.3)	21.4 (70.5)
Daily mean °C (°F)	5.4 (41.7)	7.0 (44.6)	10.7 (51.3)	16.1 (61.0)	21.3 (70.3)	24.7 (76.5)	29.1 (84.4)	28.8 (83.8)	25.1 (77.2)	19.9 (67.8)	14.3 (57.7)	7.9 (46.2)	17.5 (63.5)
Mean daily minimum °C (°F)	2.9 (37.2)	4.1 (39.4)	7.6 (45.7)	12.6 (54.7)	17.9 (64.2)	22.0 (71.6)	26.2 (79.2)	26.2 (79.2)	22.5 (72.5)	17.1 (62.8)	11.4 (52.5)	5.3 (41.5)	14.7 (58.4)
Record low °C (°F)	−10.1 (13.8)	−7.9 (17.8)	−5.4 (22.3)	−0.5 (31.1)	6.9 (44.4)	12.3 (54.1)	16.3 (61.3)	18.8 (65.8)	10.8 (51.4)	1.7 (35.1)	−4.2 (24.4)	−8.5 (16.7)	−10.1 (13.8)
Average precipitation mm (inches)	72.2 (2.84)	65.0 (2.56)	97.3 (3.83)	84.2 (3.31)	91.0 (3.58)	224.9 (8.85)	163.2 (6.43)	225.9 (8.89)	131.5 (5.18)	69.6 (2.74)	61.4 (2.42)	50.4 (1.98)	1,336.6 (52.61)
Average precipitation days (≥ 0.1 mm)	10.6	10.4	12.7	11.3	11.2	14.3	12.2	12.7	10.1	7.5	9.2	8.5	130.7
Average snowy days	2.1	1.8	0.5	0.0	0	0	0	0	0	0	0.1	0.9	5.4
Average relative humidity (%)	71	71	70	69	70	79	76	76	74	70	71	69	72
Mean monthly sunshine hours	114.3	119.9	128.5	148.5	169.8	130.9	190.8	185.7	167.5	161.4	131.1	127.4	1,775.8
Source: China Meteorological Administration (sun 1981–2010) all-time extreme temperature

Climate data for Minhang District, elevation 6 m (20 ft), (1991–2020 normals, extremes 1981–present)
Month	Jan	Feb	Mar	Apr	May	Jun	Jul	Aug	Sep	Oct	Nov	Dec	Year
Record high °C (°F)	22.2 (72.0)	27.1 (80.8)	31.5 (88.7)	33.1 (91.6)	34.4 (93.9)	37.3 (99.1)	39.5 (103.1)	40.9 (105.6)	36.2 (97.2)	34.1 (93.4)	28.3 (82.9)	23.0 (73.4)	40.9 (105.6)
Mean daily maximum °C (°F)	8.7 (47.7)	10.7 (51.3)	14.8 (58.6)	20.6 (69.1)	25.5 (77.9)	28.3 (82.9)	32.8 (91.0)	32.3 (90.1)	28.5 (83.3)	23.6 (74.5)	17.9 (64.2)	11.5 (52.7)	21.3 (70.3)
Daily mean °C (°F)	4.9 (40.8)	6.6 (43.9)	10.4 (50.7)	15.8 (60.4)	20.9 (69.6)	24.4 (75.9)	28.8 (83.8)	28.5 (83.3)	24.7 (76.5)	19.5 (67.1)	13.7 (56.7)	7.3 (45.1)	17.1 (62.8)
Mean daily minimum °C (°F)	1.9 (35.4)	3.3 (37.9)	6.8 (44.2)	11.9 (53.4)	17.2 (63.0)	21.5 (70.7)	25.8 (78.4)	25.7 (78.3)	21.6 (70.9)	15.9 (60.6)	10.1 (50.2)	3.9 (39.0)	13.8 (56.8)
Record low °C (°F)	−7.9 (17.8)	−6.3 (20.7)	−3.3 (26.1)	0.0 (32.0)	7.2 (45.0)	12.8 (55.0)	18.4 (65.1)	19.3 (66.7)	11.4 (52.5)	3.2 (37.8)	−2.0 (28.4)	−8.5 (16.7)	−8.5 (16.7)
Average precipitation mm (inches)	70.4 (2.77)	65.4 (2.57)	95.4 (3.76)	82.5 (3.25)	93.2 (3.67)	207.3 (8.16)	148.0 (5.83)	187.1 (7.37)	118.1 (4.65)	68.4 (2.69)	59.4 (2.34)	50.3 (1.98)	1,245.5 (49.04)
Average precipitation days (≥ 0.1 mm)	10.9	10.2	12.9	11.3	11.2	14.5	11.7	12.4	9.8	7.4	9.1	8.3	129.7
Average snowy days	1.8	1.4	0.4	0	0	0	0	0	0	0	0.1	0.7	4.4
Average relative humidity (%)	74	73	72	71	73	80	78	78	76	73	74	72	75
Mean monthly sunshine hours	114.8	117.9	143.8	168.1	176.8	131.2	209.4	202.3	163.7	162.1	131.1	129.7	1,850.9
Percentage possible sunshine	36	37	39	43	41	31	49	50	45	46	42	41	42
Source: China Meteorological Administration

== Cityscape ==
The 16 districts and 1 county that make up the Municipality of Shanghai

Shanghai city proper is bisected by the Huangpu River: Puxi, on the west side, is the historic center of the city, and includes the districts of Yangpu, Hongkou, Putuo, Changning, Xuhui, Jing'an, and Huangpu. Pudong is located on the east side and is the location of Shanghai's rapid development, including its new famous skyline and the Lujiazui financial district.

The outer districts, or suburbs, surround the city proper, and are Baoshan, Minhang, Jiading, Jinshan, Songjiang, Qingpu, Fengxian, and the rural eastern and southern part of Pudong.

Chongming is Shanghai's only current county and lies north of the Shanghai Peninsula on three inhabited islands in the Yangtze estuary: Chongming, Changxing, and Hengsha. Historical counties have included Nanhui and Chuansha.

== Environment ==
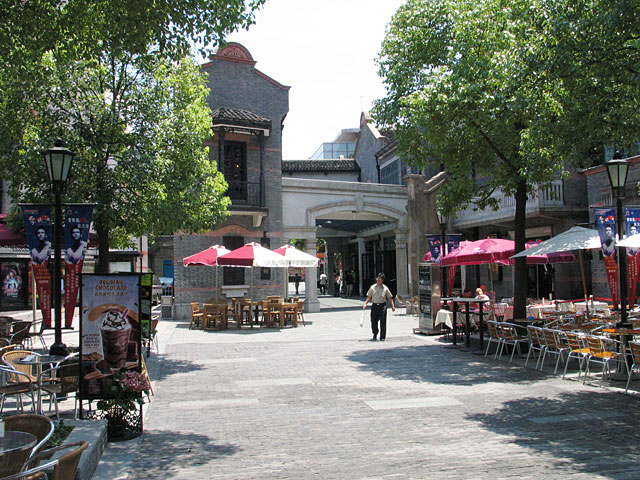
Xintiandi, a pedestrian-only area of Shanghai

Public awareness of the environment is growing, and the city is investing in a number of environmental protection projects. A 10-year, US$1 billion cleanup of Suzhou Creek, which runs through the city center, is expected to be finished in 2008, and the government also provides incentives for transportation companies to invest in LPG buses and taxis. Air pollution in Shanghai is low compared to other Chinese cities such as Beijing, but the rapid development over the past decades means it is still high on worldwide standards, comparable to Los Angeles.

== Maps and satellite images ==
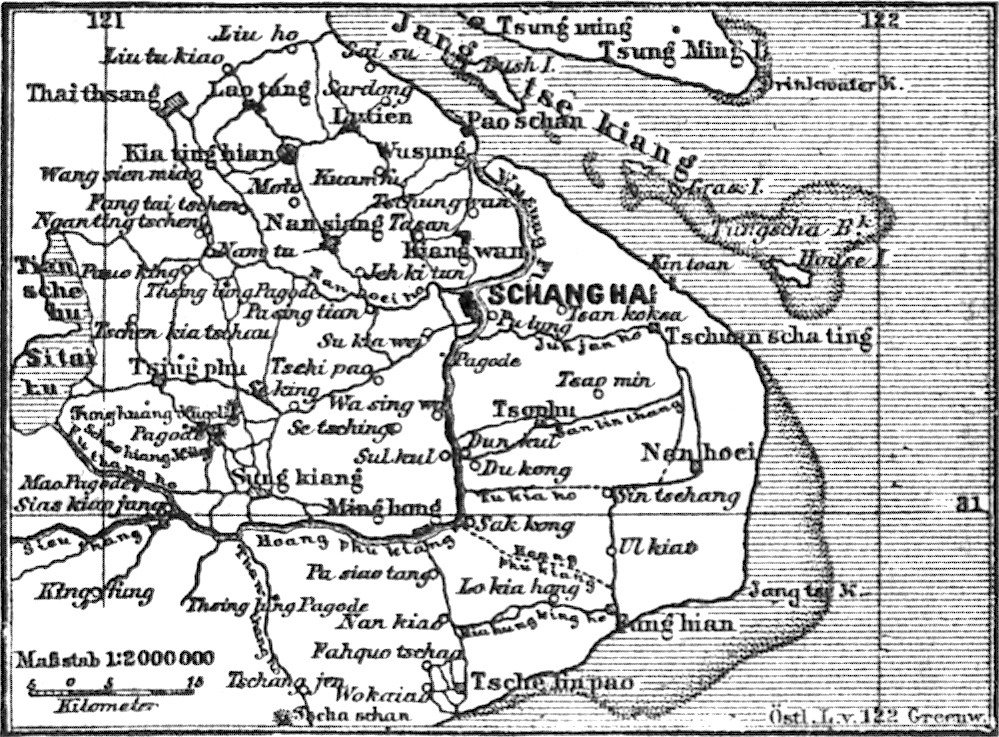
German map of Shanghai in 1890

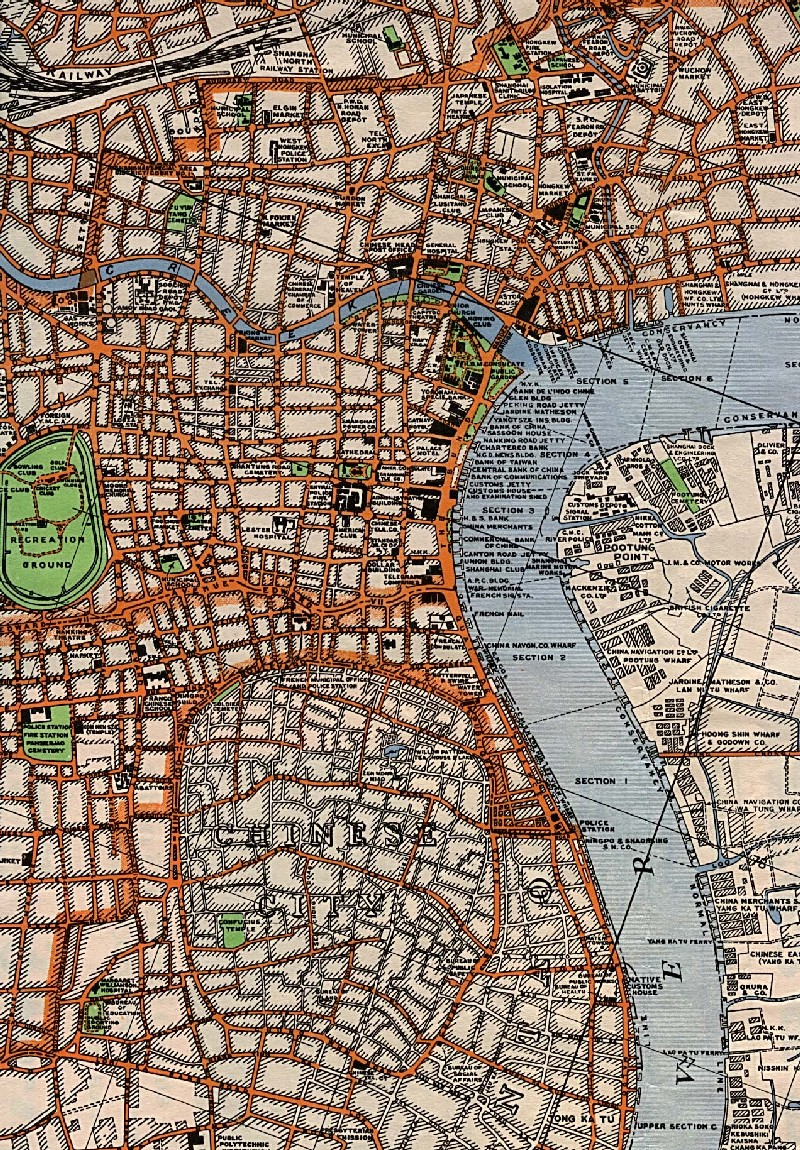
US Army 1933 map

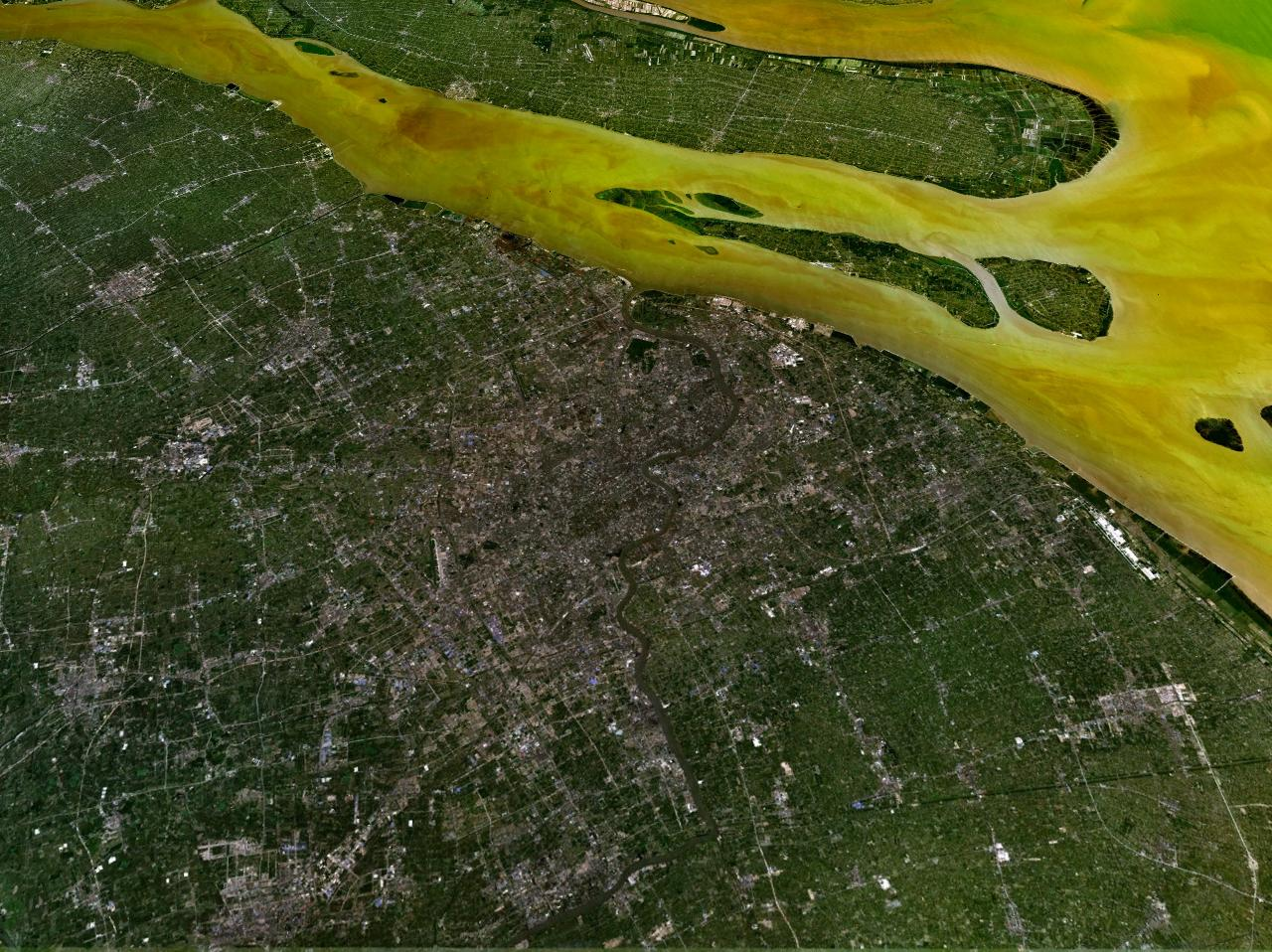
False-color satellite image

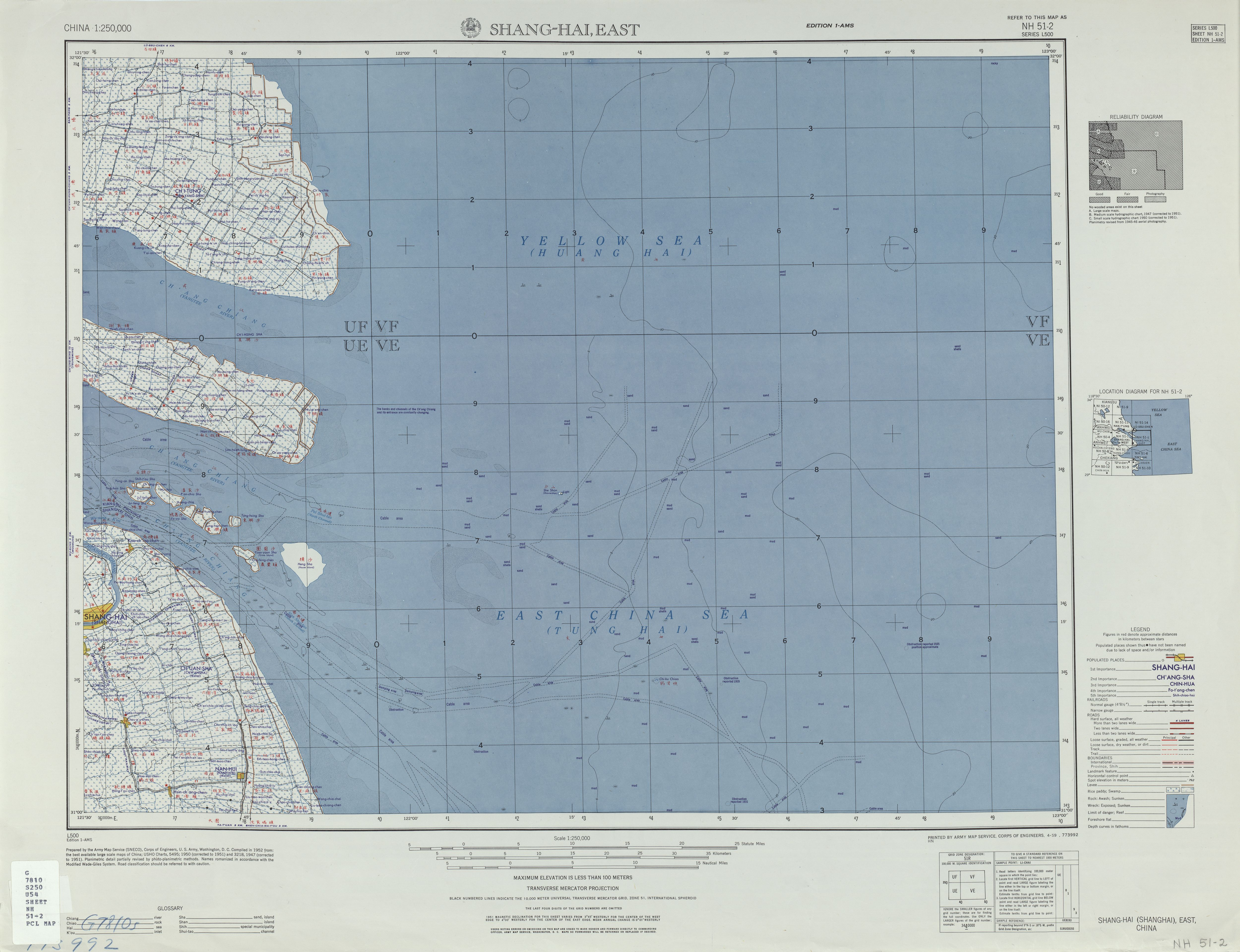
SHANG-HAI, EAST (1952)

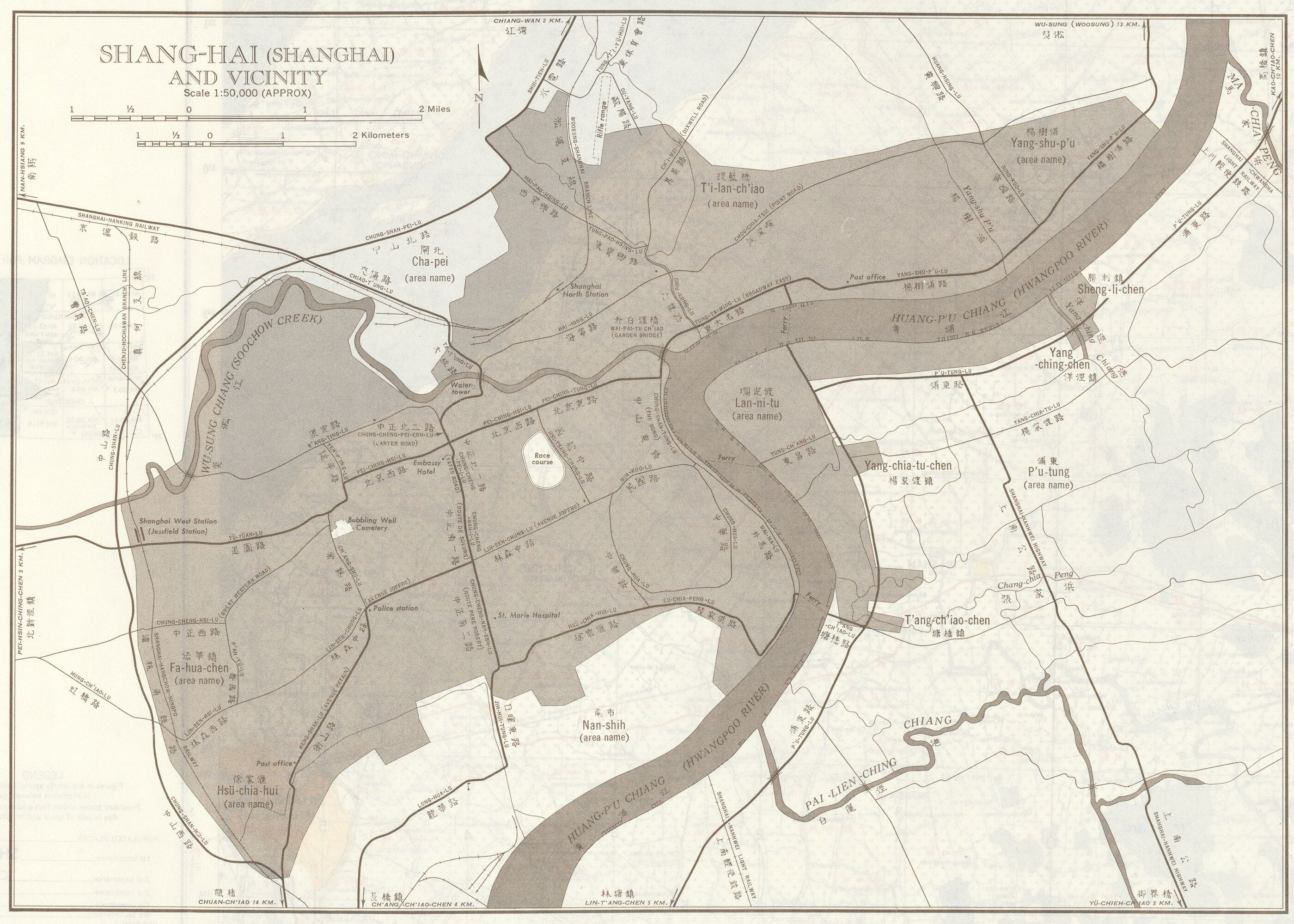
SHANG-HAI (SHANGHAI) AND VICINITY

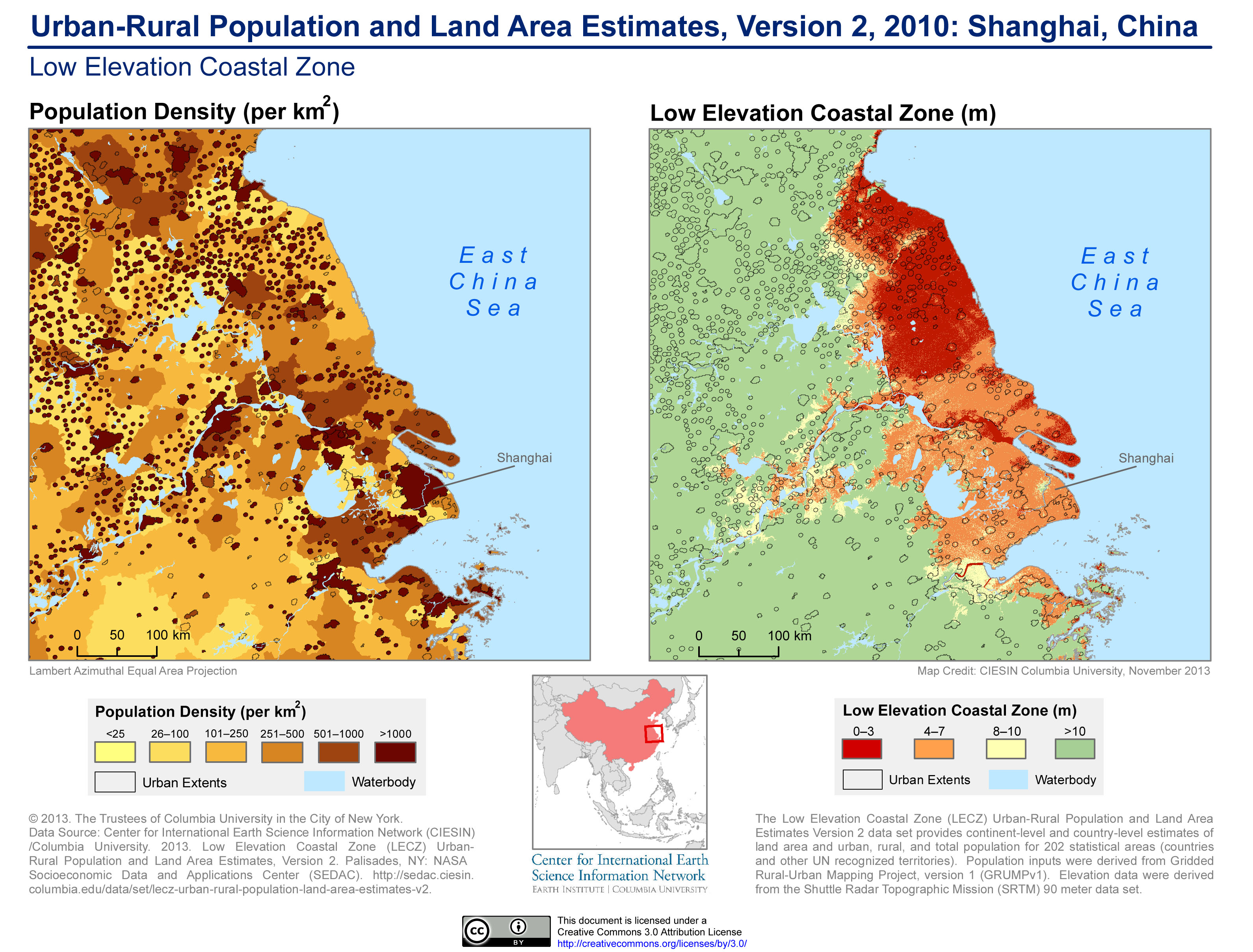
Population density and elevation above sea level

== See also ==
- Geography of China
- Yangtze River Delta
