= Lush =

Lush may refer to:

== Music ==
- Lush (band), a British rock band
- Lush (Mitski album), a 2012 album by Mitski
- Lush (Snail Mail album), a 2018 album by Snail Mail
- "Lush", a single by Skepta featuring Jay Sean
- Lush 3, a single by Orbital

== Radio stations ==
- Lush Radio, the student radio station of the University of Leicester
- Lush 99.5FM, a defunct Singaporean radio station

== Other ==
- Lush., the standard author abbreviation used to indicate Alfred Wyndham Lushington as the author when citing a botanical name
- Lush (novel), a 2006 novel by Natasha Friend
- Lush (film), a 1999 film starring Campbell Scott
- Lush (company), a cosmetics company
- A person who drinks alcohol to excess habitually, see Drunkenness or Alcoholism

== See also ==
- Lush Life (disambiguation)
- Lusher (disambiguation)
- Lushi (disambiguation)
