= Haiyong =

Haiyong 海永镇
- Town
- Interactive map of Haiyong
- Coordinates: 31°47′20″N 121°25′35″E
- Country: People's Republic of China
- Province: Jiangsu
- Prefecture: Nantong
- County: Haimen

Area
  - Total: 12.5 km^{2} (4.8 sq mi)

Population (2000)
  - Total: 5,004
  - Density: 400/km^{2} (1,040/sq mi)
- Time zone: UTC+8 (China Standard Time)
- Website: www.haiyong.gov.cn

Haiyong
- Traditional Chinese: 海永鎮
- Simplified Chinese: 海永镇
- Literal meaning: Sea Yong[longsha] Township
Transcriptions
Standard Mandarin
- Hanyu Pinyin: Hǎiyǒng Zhèn

Yonglongsha Farm
- Traditional Chinese: 永隆沙良種場
- Simplified Chinese: 永隆沙良种场
- Literal meaning: Yonglongsha Improved Variety Fields
Transcriptions
Standard Mandarin
- Hanyu Pinyin: Yǒnglóngshā Liángzhǒngcháng

Haiyong

Shanghai in Jiangsu
- Traditional Chinese: 江蘇的上海
- Simplified Chinese: 江苏的上海
Transcriptions
Standard Mandarin
- Hanyu Pinyin: Jiāngsū de Shànghǎi

Haimen on Chongming
- Traditional Chinese: 海門的崇明
- Simplified Chinese: 海门的崇明
Transcriptions
Standard Mandarin
- Hanyu Pinyin: Hǎimén de Chóngmíng

Haiyong (Chinese: 海永镇; pinyin: Hǎiyǒng Zhèn) is a town of Haimen District in Nantong, Jiangsu, China. Together with neighboring Qilong, it forms a pene-enclave of the province on Chongming Island, most of which belongs to the province-level municipality of Shanghai. Haiyong presently covers about 12.5 square kilometers (5 sq mi) and had a population of 5,004 during the year 2000 census.

== Location ==
Haiyong is a pene-enclave bordered on the south and west by Shanghai's Chongming County, on the east by Qidong's Qilong Township, and on the north by the Yangtze. Because of its unusual position, it is sometimes described in Chinese as "Shanghai in Jiangsu" or "Haimen on Chongming". It is located about 60 kilometers (40 mi) from downtown Shanghai and 80 kilometers (50 mi) from Shanghai's Pudong International Airport.

== History ==
Yonglongsha, a shoal in the channel of the Yangtze north of Chongming Island, reappeared most recently in 1937. Workers from Haimen began to utilize the land in 1966 and, by 1968, had stabilized the land enough that the conflicting claims of Haimen and Qidong were mediated by Nantong, which divided the island between them. Over 3000 workers labored over the next year, reclaiming 2 km^{2} (0.77 sq mi) by 1970. The area was then incorporated into Haimen in 1972 as the Yonglongsha Farm. Continuing reclamation projects and natural deposition of sediment joined it to Chongming Island in 1975. The present township was established in 1992. It was connected to Chongming's road network but this was only connected to Jiangsu by ferry service prior to the 2011 opening of the Chongqi Bridge between Chenjia and Qidong. Its area was recently increased by the addition of another 3.2 km^{2} (1.2 sq mi) of reclaimed land.

Prior to Yonglongsha's absorption by Chongming, it offered ferry service to Haimen's Lingdian Harbor (t 靈甸港, s 灵甸港, p Língdiāngǎng) and Qidong's Sanhe Harbor (三和港, Sānhégǎng).

Haiyong Township was changed to Haiyong Town in September 2015.

== Economy ==
Haiyong's main products are agricultural. Apart from rice, Shanan has 500 mu (0.33 km^{2} or 0.13 sq mi) of land devoted to sugarcane production and another 500 mu devoted to watermelon and cotton, while a 1000 mu area of Yongbei grows a variety of vegetables, cotton, rape, and small melons such as hami melon, cantaloupe, and honeydew. The area also farms pigs, hairy crab, and whiteleg shrimp. The current plan is for the development of more green and organic farming to be marketed in Shanghai.

== Government ==
The town of Haiyong forms part of the county-level city of Haimen, itself part of the prefecture-level city of Nantong in Jiangsu province. It is divided among the community of Tongjiang (通江街社区, Tōngjiāng Jiēshèqū) and the villages of Shanan (沙南村, Shā'nán Cūn) and Yongbei (永北村, Yǒngběi Cūn).

== See also ==
- Qilong Township
- List of enclaves and exclaves
- List of township-level divisions of Jiangsu
