= Chenjia =

Chenjia (Chinese: t 陳家, s 陈家, p Chénjiā, lit. "[home of] the Chen family") may refer to the following places in China:

== Towns ==
The following towns may also be known as Chenjiazhen (t 陳家鎮, s 陈家镇, p Chénjiā Zhèn):

- Chenjia, Shanghai, on Chongming Island
- Chenjia, Sichuan, in Zizhong County

== Townships ==
The following townships may also be known as Chenjiaxiang (t 陳家鄉, s 陈家乡, p Chénjiā Xiāng):

- Chenjia, Liaoning, in Panshan County
