= Islands of Shanghai =

Geographic features in China

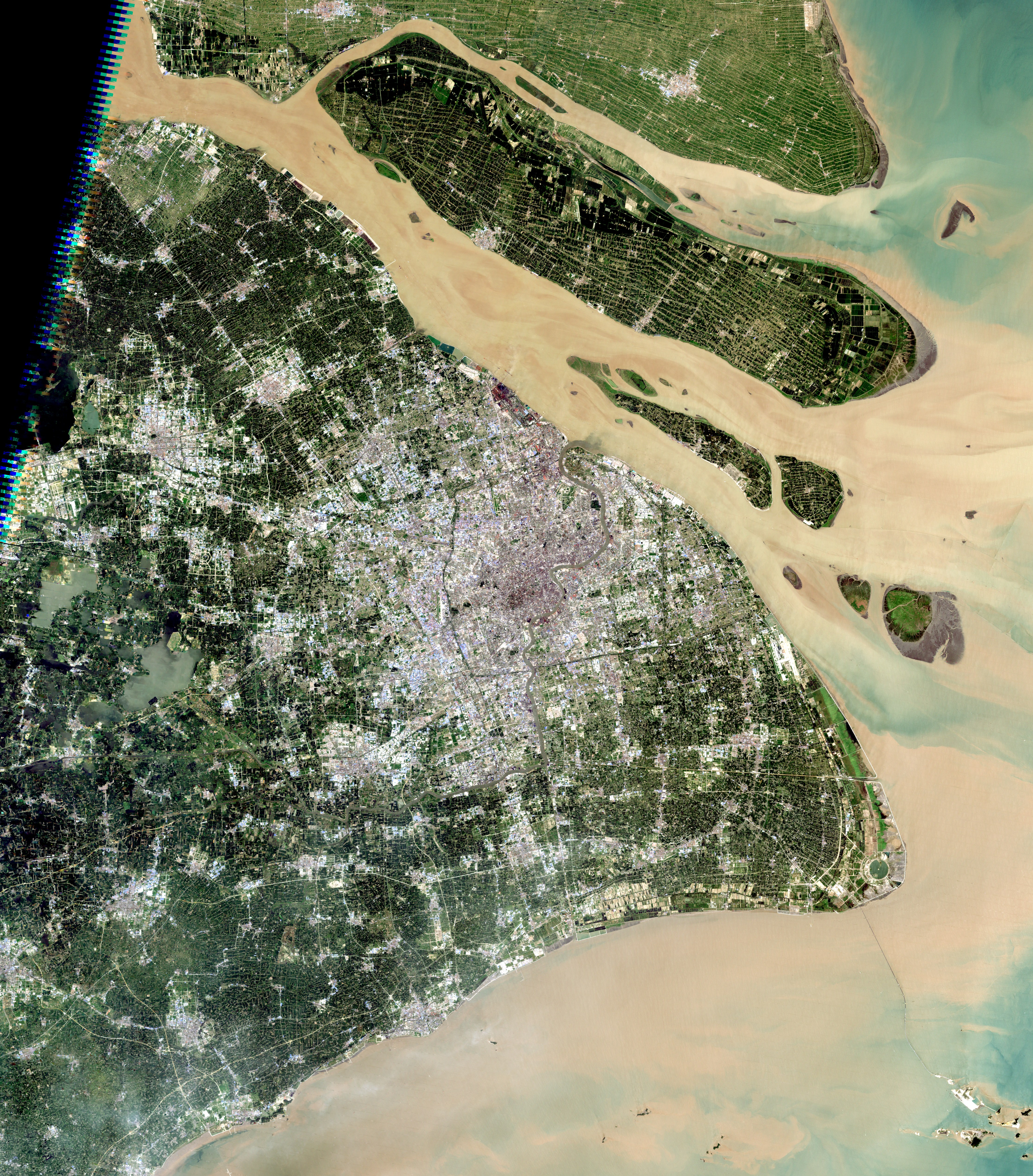
A false-color image of northeastern Shanghai: Chongming forms the northern bank of this channel of the Yangtze while Changxing (L) and Hengsha (R) lie midstream. The four shoals of Jiuduansha lie to the southeast, off the coast of Pudong.

The islands of Shanghai are those under the jurisdiction of the Shanghai municipal government. They comprise three large inhabited islands and a shifting number of smaller, uninhabited ones. Most are alluvial islands in the Yangtze River Delta in China, although a number of islands in Hangzhou Bay off Jinshan District are also administered by Shanghai. The alluvial islands are relatively young and their number varies over time. In 2006, the city's 19 uninhabited islands covered 226.27 square kilometers (87.36 sq mi), with a total coastline length of 309 kilometers (192 mi).

The Yangshan area of the Port of Shanghai is also located on two islands, Greater and Lesser Yangshan in Hangzhou Bay, but these are administered as part of Zhejiang's Shengsi County.

== Chongming County ==
All three inhabited islands of Shanghai are alluvial islands in the Yangtze estuary between the Municipality of Shanghai and Jiangsu Province. They are administered as Chongming County, with its seat at Chengqiao on Chongming Island. The county was added to Shanghai from Jiangsu in 1958 and remains mostly rural: In 2008, its registered population of 693 000 included 450 300 farmers.

Chongming Island (崇明岛) (1,267 km^{2} or 489 sq mi) is now the second-largest island of mainland China (after Hainan). The natural expansion of the island has been greatly accelerated by reclamation projects, which doubled its size between 1950 and 2010. This growth caused it to absorb the former island of Yonglongsha, creating a long pene-exclave of Jiangsu on its northern shore administered as the townships of Haiyong and Qilong. The island was connected to Changxing by the Yangtze Bridge in 2009 and to Qidong in Jiangsu by the Chongqi Bridge in 2011. The Chonghai Bridge, to Haimen in Jiangsu, remains under construction and plans for Shanghai's S7 (Huchong) Expressway call for the creation of a bridge directly from Baoshan District to Chengqiao.

Changxing Island (长兴岛) (88.54 km^{2} or 34.19 sq mi) lies between Chongming and Shanghai in the southern channel of the Yangtze opposite the mouth of the Huangpu, the major river of central Shanghai. It is connected to Chongming by the Yangtze Bridge and Shanghai's Pudong New Area by the Yangtze Tunnel.

Hengsha Island (横沙岛) (55.74 km^{2} or 21.52 sq mi) lies to Changxing's east and is connected with the mainland and other islands by ferry service.

== Pudong New Area ==
Jiuduansha is an intertidal wetland. The 114.6 km^{2} (44.2 sq mi) area above sea level comprises four major shoals: Upper, Middle, Lower, and South Jiuduansha. (Note: Also known by the Mandarin form of their Chinese names: Shangsha, Zhongsha, Xiasha, and Jiangyanansha. The last is named for its proximity to the site of the 1948 explosion and sinking of the SS Kiangya.) These shoals and the waters surrounding them to a depth of 6 meters or 20 feet (occupying an additional 308.6 km^{2} or 119.2 sq mi) form the Jiuduansha Wetland Nature Reserve, a nationally-protected area of Shanghai. The shoals began forming during the Yangtze floods of the late 1940s and early 1950s, but were developed and protected as a replacement for the wetlands of eastern Pudong during the construction of Shanghai's international airport in the 1990s. The cordgrass introduced in 1995 has succeeded in stabilizing the shoals but is now considered to be highly invasive, displacing the native reeds and bullrushes and degrading parts of the wetlands. A wetland museum, as well as a Science Popularization Park on about 5 square kilometers (1.9 sq mi) of the island, are planned to increase public awareness and support.

== Jinshan District ==
Dajinshan Island (t 大金山島, s 大金山岛, p Dàjīnshān Dǎo, lit. "Greater Gold Mountain Island"), Xiaojinshan Island ("Lesser Gold Mountain Island"), and Fushan Island in Jinshan District are nature reserves under city jurisdiction. They are located in Hangzhou Bay. Dajinshan has the highest point in Shanghai with an elevation of 103.4 meters (339 ft).

== See also ==
- Islands of China
