= Chongming =

Chongming is an island in the Yangtze estuary north of Shanghai, China. It may refer either to:

- Chongming Island itself
- Chongming District, the area of Shanghai including Changxing, Hengsha, and most (but not all) of Chongming Island
