= Lush (surname) =

Lush is a surname.

== List of people with the surname ==
- Alfred Wyndham Lushington (1860–1920), Anglo-Indian dendrologist and forest officer
- Anne Lush (1857–1937), New Zealand painter
- Archibald Lush (1890s–1974), Welsh school inspector
- Billy Lush (born 1981), American actor
- Billy Lush (baseball) (1873–1951), American baseball player and college sports coach
- David Lush (1887–1960), Canadian politician
- Ernie Lush (1885–1937), American baseball player
- Jay Laurence Lush (1896–1982), American geneticist
- Jane Lush, British worker
- Johnny Lush (1885–1946), American baseball player
- John Alfred Lush (1815–1888), English Liberal politician
- Julie Anthony (singer) (Julie Moncrief Lush, born 1949), Australian entertainer
- Marcus Lush (born 1965), New Zealand politician, television and radio presenter
- Richard Lush, British-born Australian recording engineer and producer
- Rebecca Lush (born 1972), British activist
- Robert Lush (1807–1881), English judge
- Samuel S. Lush (1783–1841), American lawyer and politician
- Stephen Lush (1753–1825), American politician
- Shannon Lush, Australian best-selling author
- Tom Lush (born 1939), Canadian politician

== See also ==
- Lusher
- Lash (surname)
