= Lüst =

Lüst is a surname. Notable people with the surname include:

- Dieter Lüst (born 1956), German theoretic physicist
- Reimar Lüst (1923–2020), German astrophysicist

== See also ==
- Lusth
