= Lusher =

Lusher may refer to:

== People ==
- Caroline Redman Lusher, British musician
- Don Lusher, British musician
- Edwin Lusher, Australian judge
- Jeanne Lusher, American physician
- Stephen Lusher, Australian politician

== Other ==
- Lusher Charter School, public charter school in New Orleans, Louisiana.

== See also ==
- Lush (surname)
- Lush (disambiguation)
- Lushi (disambiguation)
