= Lusi =

Lusi may refer to:

== Geography ==
- Lüsi, Port Lüsi, or Lüsigang, a town in southeastern Jiangsu, China
- Lusi, Greece, an ancient city of the Achaean League
- Lusi (Heinola), a village in Heinola, Finland
- The Sidoarjo mud flow, a mud volcano in Java, Indonesia, nicknamed Lusi by the local population
- Lusi River, a tributary of the Solo River in northern Java, Indonesia
- Luci Island, also known as Lusi Island, in Xiuyu District, Putian, Fujian, China

== People ==
- Lusi Sione, a former New Zealand rugby league player
- Jing Lusi (born 1985), a British actress of Chinese descent
- Spiridion Lusi, Greek scholar, diplomat, politician and naturalized ambassador of Prussia.

== Other uses ==
- The Lusi language of New Britain
- Tropical Cyclone Lusi, a storm in the 1997–98 South Pacific cyclone season
- Cyclone Lusi, a storm in the 2013–14 South Pacific cyclone season

== See also ==
- Lushi (disambiguation)
- Lusis, the debut album of Christian industrial dance band Mortal
- Sione Lousi, a professional rugby league footballer
