= Heen naran =

Scientific classification
- Kingdom: Plantae
- (unranked): Angiosperms
- (unranked): Eudicots
- (unranked): Rosids
- Order: Sapindales
- Family: Rutaceae
- Genus: Citrus
- Species: C. crenatifolia

Binomial name
- Citrus crenatifolia Lush.

Species of fruit and plant

Heen naran (Citrus crenatifolia), is a tangerine native to Sri Lanka, having very small, moderately oblate to obconical, deep orange fruit with a thin, moderately loose rind. The flesh is somewhat coarse-grained, dry, and acidic, but becomes edible at full maturity.

== Taxonomy ==
The name and status of the species is unresolved. Tanaka suggested that it may be conspecific with C. lycopersicaeformis, the 'Kokni' or 'Monkey mandarin' found in southern India.
