= Qilong Township =

Qilong 启隆乡
- Township
- Location in Jiangsu Qilong (Shanghai)
- Coordinates (Qilong government): 31°46′27″N 121°27′23″E
- Country: People's Republic of China
- Province: Jiangsu
- Prefecture-level city: Nantong
- County-level city: Qidong

Area
  - Total: 36.8 km^{2} (14.2 sq mi)

Population (2010)
  - Total: 3,436
  - Density: 93.4/km^{2} (242/sq mi)
- Time zone: UTC+8 (China Standard Time)

Qilong Township
- Traditional Chinese: 啟隆鄉
- Simplified Chinese: 启隆乡
Transcriptions
Standard Mandarin
- Hanyu Pinyin: Qǐlóng Xiāng

Qidong Stock Farm
- Traditional Chinese: 啟東縣農業良種繁育場
- Simplified Chinese: 启东县农业良种繁育场
Transcriptions
Standard Mandarin
- Hanyu Pinyin: Qǐdōng Xiàn Nóngyè Liángzhǒng Fányù Cháng

Qilong is a township of Qidong in eastern Jiangsu province. The land it occupies was formerly Yonglongsha, a separate island in the Yangtze River delta, but reclamation projects and natural deposition of sediment have joined it to Chongming Island, where it now forms a pene-enclave within Shanghai's Chongming County. Its population was 3436 at the time of the 2010 Chinese census. Qilong's name—literally "opening prosperity"—is a compound of contracted forms of its county and its former island.

== History ==
Yonglongsha, a shoal in the channel of the Yangtze north of Chongming Island, reappeared most recently in 1937. By 1968, workers from Jiangsu had stabilized the land enough that the conflicting claims of the counties of Haimen and Qidong were mediated by their prefecture of Nantong, which divided the island between them. Qidong's area was organized as a farmstead. Continuing reclamation projects and natural deposition of sediment joined it to Chongming Island in 1972. Another area of Qilong derives from its later absorption of Xinglongsha (Chinese: 兴隆沙; pinyin: Xīnglóngshā), another shoal.

Prior to Yonglongsha's absorption by Chongming, it offered ferry service to Haimen's Lingdian Harbor (灵甸港; Língdiāngǎng) and Qidong's Sanhe Harbor (三和港; Sānhégǎng). Qilong was elevated to a township in 1992 and is now connected to Chongming's road network but this also was only connected to Jiangsu by ferry service prior to the 2011 opening of the Chongqi Bridge between Chenjia and Qidong. In 2008, its urban plan included 6.66 hectares (16.5 acres) for the construction of five agricultural parks: a rare flower park, a ginkgo park, a pear orchard, an orangery, and a nursery forest.

The area achieved minor notability in 2014 when satellite imagery revealed that a local farm had shaped one of its fields into a taijitu (yin-yang symbol).

== Economy ==
As with many areas of Chongming Island, Qilong farms hairy crab. In addition, they grow edamame for export to Japan and South Korea and malting barley for domestic production. From 2003, Qilong has seen dairy farms established and expanded for Shanghai-area milk companies. The Shanghai-based Yaoji Playing Card Company also has plans to construct a 1 km^{2} (0.39 sq mi) Thai-themed amusement park in the territory.

== Government ==
The township of Qilong forms part of the county-level city of Qidong, itself part of the prefecture-level city of Nantong in Jiangsu province. Qilong is divided between the communities of Yonglong (永隆社区, Yǒnglóng Shèqū) and Xinglong (兴隆社区, Xīnglóng Shèqū).

== See also ==
- Haiyong, the neighboring exclave of Haimen on Chongming
- List of enclaves and exclaves
- List of township-level divisions of Jiangsu
