= Yonglongsha =

Former island in China

- Chinese: 永隆沙
- Literal meaning: Ever-Prosperous Sands
Transcriptions
Standard Mandarin
- Hanyu Pinyin: Yǒnglóngshā; Yǒnglóng Shā

Yongfengsha
- Traditional Chinese: 永豐沙
- Simplified Chinese: 永丰沙
- Literal meaning: Ever-Plentiful Sands
Transcriptions
Standard Mandarin
- Hanyu Pinyin: Yǒngfēng Shā; Yǒngfēngshā

Hefengsha
- Traditional Chinese: 合豐沙
- Simplified Chinese: 合丰沙
- Literal meaning: Joined & Plentiful Sands
Transcriptions
Standard Mandarin
- Hanyu Pinyin: Héfēng Shā; Héfēngshā

Yonglongsha, sometimes translated as the Yonglong Shoal or Yonglong Sands, was a former island in the north channel of the Yangtze River to the north of Chongming in eastern China. It was also known as Yongfengsha and Hefengsha. Prior to its absorption by Chongming, it measured about 16 kilometers (9.9 mi) east to west but was very narrow, with an area of about 14 km^{2} (5.4 sq mi).

== History ==
Yonglongsha first appeared in the 42nd year of Kangxi (1703) but was impermanent. It emerged most recently in 1937. Eroding on the south and east while growing to the north and west, it migrated from the center of the Yangtze's northern channel towards Chongming. Its shores were stabilized and expanded by workers from Haimen and Qidong, two county-level cities of Nantong in Jiangsu, in the late 1960s. The reclaimed areas were administered at first as farmsteads. By 1968, there were 1,800 hectares (18 km^{2} or 6.9 sq mi) under cultivation, growing corn and fava beans. Another 3000 workers sent by Haimen over the next year reclaimed another 2 square kilometers (0.77 sq mi) by 1970. The same year, 200 households became the island's first permanent inhabitants. Qidong's area of the island began to merge with Chongming in 1972, followed by Haimen's three years later. Now its former area continues to be administered as Jiangsu's pene-enclave townships of Haiyong and Qilong rather than as part of Shanghai's Chongming County. Areas of the former channel between the two islands form the North Heng Irrigation Canal (t 北橫引河, s 北横引河, p Běi Héng Yǐnhé), a stretch of the canal which runs in a partial ring around Chongming Island.

A separate area of present-day Qilong derives from its absorption of a second shoal, Xinglongsha (t 興隆沙, s 兴隆沙, p Xīnglóngshā), which likewise formed in the middle of the Yangtze's channel and then migrated over time towards Chongming.

== Infrastructure ==
During its existence, the island had ferry service to Haimen's Lingdian Harbor (t 靈甸港, s 灵甸港, p Língdiāngǎng) and Qidong's Sanhe Harbor (三和港, Sānhégǎng). Its communities are now connected to Chongming's highway and ferry network, including the Chongqi Bridge to Qidong.

== See also ==
- Chongming Island
- Haiyong & Qilong
- Islands of Shanghai
