= Lusth =

Lusth is a surname. Notable people with the surname include:

- Mats Lusth (born 1962), Swedish ice hockey player and coach
- Ozzy Lusth (born 1981), American reality show contestant

== See also ==
- Lush (surname)
