= Lushlife (disambiguation) =

Lushlife (born 1981) is an American rapper and record producer.

Lushlife may also refer to:

- Lushlife (album), a 2000 album by Bowery Electric
- "Lushlife", a song by Baboon from We Sing and Play

== See also ==
- Lush Life (disambiguation)
