= Chonghai Bridge =

Bridge in People's Republic of China

The Chonghai Bridge (simplified Chinese: 崇海大桥; traditional Chinese: 崇海大橋; pinyin: Chónghǎi Dàqiáo) is a proposed bridge to span the northern distributary at the mouth of the Yangtze River in the People's Republic of China. The bridge, along with the Chongqi Bridge and the Shanghai Yangtze River Tunnel and Bridge, is to connect the city of Shanghai with the north bank of the Yangtze in Jiangsu Province via Chongming Island.

== Location ==
The Chonghai Bridge will run from northeast to southwest. The south bank is located about 1.7 kilometres (1.1 mi) east of Niupeng Port in Chongming District, Shanghai, and the north bank is located about 600 metres (2,000 ft) west of Qinglong Port in Haimen City, Jiangsu Province. The river at the site of the bridge is 1.8 kilometres (1.1 mi) wide. It is connected to Ningqi Expressway in the north, and Chongming Island Expressway in the south.

== History ==
- After 13 years of work, the feasibility demonstration of the technical layer of the Chonghai Bridge was completed.
- In August 2003, the Jiangsu Provincial Party Committee and the Provincial Government held a meeting on the development along the river in Taizhou, and listed the construction of the Chonghai Bridge as the intention of the overall plan for development along the river.
- On January 20, 2006, the Fourth Session of the Tenth People's Congress of Jiangsu Province approved the Chonghai Bridge to be included in the 11th Five-Year Plan for National Economic and Social Development of Jiangsu Province.
- On May 8, 2006, the Haimen Municipal Party Committee and Municipal Government established the Bridge Construction Headquarters and listed the bridge as the Haimen No. 1 Project to further strengthen the leadership of the bridge construction, enrich the technical strength, and speed up the construction process.
- It was due to open in 2010. However, as of June 9, 2010, the bridge's location is still under research and planning.

== Related people ==
- Li Guohao
- Xiang Haifan
- Fan Lichu
- Shi Yafeng
- Chen Jiyu

== See also ==
- Bridges and tunnels across the Yangtze River
- Shanghai Tongji University
