= Shou'an Temple Chongming =

Buddhist temple in Chongming, Shanghai, China

Shou'an Temple (Chinese: 寿安寺; pinyin: Shòu'ān Sì) is a Buddhist temple on Chongming Island, in Chengqiao, Chongming District, Shanghai, China.

== History ==
The temple was founded between 1241 and 1252 by two monks from Sichuan, Mo and Chou, who followed the Tiantai school of Buddhism. In 1318, during the Yuan dynasty, it received the name Yongfu Shou'an Temple.

The temple was relocated several times as Chongming's shoreline changed and the county seat moved. Earlier buildings were lost to erosion and fire. In 1583, the county magistrate He Maoguan provided land for rebuilding the temple east of the county town.

Further rebuilding took place in 1668 with support from the military commander Zhang Dazhi. Jin'ao Hill was constructed behind the temple, along with a lotus pond and bamboo plantings. In 1777, the county magistrate Fan Guotai supported another restoration and recorded the work in a stone inscription.

== Grounds ==
Shanghai's tourism authority lists Shou'an Temple as a district-level protected cultural heritage site. The temple grounds cover about 22 mu, or 1.5 hectares. Two ginkgo trees within the grounds are described by the authority as dating from the Ming dynasty.

The adjoining Jin'ao Hill garden contains winding paths, lotus ponds and bamboo groves. Its buildings include Zhenhai Pagoda, Qingyuan Hall and Guanyin Pavilion. The garden's layout reflects the classical garden traditions of Jiangnan.
