= Anne Lush =

New Zealand painter and missionary

Annette (Anne) Ruddock (née Lush; 1857–1937) was a New Zealand painter and missionary.

== Biography ==
Lush was born in Howick, Auckland in 1857. Her father was Vicesimus Lush, the vicar of Howick, and her mother's name was Blanche. In 1868, the family moved to Thames as he was transferred there, then to Hamilton in 1881 when he was transferred again. Lush's life centred around the church and she became a Sunday school teacher and volunteered for the Melanesia Mission. In 1880, Lush travelled to Norfolk Island as part of a church mission building a church there. On this mission, she met her future husband, David Ruddock, a vicar and later an archdeacon. They were married in 1885 in Auckland.

Due to her husband's assignments, Lush moved frequently to Australia and England. In 1903, he was posted to Wairoa in the Hawke's Bay.

Lush had six children; her two sons died in World War I. She died in 1937 aged 80.
