= Lush Life =

Lush Life may refer to:

== Film and television ==
- Lush Life (TV series), a 1996 American sitcom
- Lush Life, a 1993 TV movie starring Jeff Goldblum
- "Lush Life", an episode of the sitcom The King of Queens

== Fiction and drama ==
- Lush Life (novel), a 2008 contemporary social novel by Richard Price
- Lush Life: A Biography of Billy Strayhorn, a 1997 book by David Hajdu
- Lush Life, a 2005 play by Paul Sirett

== Music ==
=== Songs ===
- "Lush Life" (jazz song), a jazz standard by Billy Strayhorn
- "Lush Life" (Zara Larsson song), 2015
- "Lush Life", a 2000 song by Sugababes from One Touch

=== Albums ===
- Lush Life (John Coltrane album), 1961
- Lush Life (Lou Donaldson album), 1967
- Lush Life (Nancy Wilson album), 1967
- Lush Life (Dave Burrell album), 1978
- Lush Life (Linda Ronstadt album), 1984
- Lush Life (Tete Montoliu album), 1986
- Lush Life (The George Golla Orchestra album), 1986
- Lush Life (The Belair Lip Bombs album), 2023
- Lush Life: The Music of Billy Strayhorn, a 1992 album by Joe Henderson
- Lush Life: The Lost Sinatra Arrangements, a 2025 album by Seth MacFarlane
- Lush Life, an album by Billy Strayhorn, 1965
- Lush Life, an album by Rick Kiefer (1975)
- Lush Life, a 1978 album by Bill Farrell
- Lush Life, an album by Tony Scott, 1989
- Lush Life, a 1998 album by Peter King
- Lush Life - tribute to Billy Strayhorn, a 2003 album by Gianni Basso
- Lush Life, a 2009 album by B. J. Cole, Roger Beaujolais, and Simon Thorpe

== See also ==
- Lush Life, a jazz club founded by Horst Liepolt
- Lushlife (disambiguation)
