= Hengsha Island =

Chinese island

Coordinates: 31°20′35.4″N 121°50′36″E

Hengsha
- The position of Hengsha (red) within Shanghai (Note that this map does not display the enclaves of Jiangsu on Chongming)

Hengsha Island
- Traditional Chinese: 橫沙島
- Simplified Chinese: 横沙岛
- Literal meaning: Heng Sands Island
Transcriptions
Standard Mandarin
- Hanyu Pinyin: Héngshā Dǎo

Hengsha Township
- Traditional Chinese: 橫沙鄉
- Simplified Chinese: 横沙乡
Transcriptions
Standard Mandarin
- Hanyu Pinyin: Héngshā Xiāng

Hengsha (横沙岛, Shanghainese: Waan So Tau) is a low-lying alluvial island at the mouth of the Yangtze River in eastern China. Together with the islands of Chongming and Changxing, it forms Chongming District, the northernmost area of the provincial-level municipality of Shanghai. Its population was 33,400 in 2008.

== Name ==
Heng is the horizontal, rightward stroke ⟨一⟩ used in writing Chinese characters, similar in form to a dash. It is also used to mean "horizontal". It was applied to the island for the way it formerly stood athwart the mouth of the Yangtze, although time has now given it a round or heart-like shape and moved it in line with Changxing.

== History ==
Hengsha first emerged from the Yangtze in 1858. It began to be reclaimed for agricultural purposes in 1886 or 1890. Hengsha Township was established in 1909. Between its formation and 1958, the island gradually expanded towards the northwest while receding to the southeast: together, these actions caused the island to "migrate" about 5.25 kilometers (3.3 mi) in the direction of Changxing. Under the Republic, the island carried on an active trade in grains via junk.

Hengsha was originally part of Chuansha County, which later merged into Pudong. In 1958, the island was placed under Baoshan County, as its ferries operated from the harbor of Wusong at the mouth of the Huangpu. The island's wandering was ended by the erection of a seawall and stabilization of the banks around the island. The next year, it saw a major influx of population, including boat people who were organized into fishing brigades. During the Down to the Countryside Movement, many of the sent-down youth from Shanghai travelled no further than Hengsha, where they assisted in reclamation, urban defense, and propaganda efforts.

Hengsha was named among the first set of national tourist resorts (t 國家級旅遊度假村, s 国家级旅游度假村, p guójiā jí lǚyóu dùjià cūn) by Beijing in October 1992. Initial plans called for the construction of a casino, although that was cancelled. In March 2002, the Shanghai Municipal Government approved plans to develop Hengsha as an international conference center and forest park, with tree coverage over at least 70% of the island. In 2005, it was moved from the jurisdiction of Baoshan District to Chongming County.

== Geography ==
Hengsha is located in the channel of the Yangtze River flowing south of Chongming and north of the districts of Baoshan and Pudong immediately before its entrance into the East China Sea. Hengsha is the southeasternmost of the three islands of Chongming County, separated from Changxing to its west by the Hengsha Xiaogang Channel.

Hengsha is fairly round, with a height north-to-south of about 10 kilometers (6.2 mi) and a breadth east-to-west of about 8 kilometers (5.0 mi). Constantly expanding, it covered about 56 square kilometers (22 sq mi) in 2010 and had an average elevation of 2.87 meters (9 ft 5 in).

=== Land reclamation ===
Hengsha is the site of significant land reclamation works, with dykes constructed to its southeast in order to drain and fill approximately 100 square kilometers during the lifetime of the project.

== Economy ==
The orchards of Hengsha are the center for Shanghai's production of citrus fruits. Other crops include rice, cotton, and rape. Both freshwater and marine fishing are practiced, principally landing two kinds of anchovy. The island is also being developed for ecotourism and high-end resorts, including an international conference center, communities of low-density luxury villas, and yacht clubs.

One of Shanghai's commercial cemeteries is located on the island and the Hengsha Xiaogang Channel is also used for sea burials and the dispersing of ashes.

== Government ==
Hengsha is administered as a single township, also named Hengsha. This is divided into 24 villages, including one fishing village. The main settlement is at Xinmin (新民居委会, Xīnmín Jūwěihuì). The others are:

Xingsheng (兴胜村, Xìngshèng Cūn),
Zengchan (增产村, Zēngchǎn Cūn),
Gongping (公平村, Gōngpíng Cūn),
Hongqi (红旗村, Hóngqí Cūn),
Dongbang (东浜村, Dōngbāng Cūn),
Xinbeicun (新北村, Xīnběicūn),
Xinglong (兴隆村, Xīnglóng Cūn),
Fengle (丰乐村, Fēnglè cūn),
Xinchun (新春村, Xīnchūn Cūn),
Dongxing (东兴村, Dōngxìng Cūn),
Xinlian (新联村, Xīnlián Cūn),
Huifeng (惠丰村, Huìfēng Cūn),
Xinyong (新永村, Xīnyǒng Cūn),
Minjian (民建村, Mínjiàn Cūn),
Minsheng (民生村, Mínshēng Cūn),
Yongfa (永发村, Yǒngfā Cūn),
Fumin (富民村, Fùmín Cūn),
Yongsheng (永胜村, Yǒngshèng Cūn),
Donghai (东海村, Dōnghǎi Cūn),
Minxing (民星村, Mínxīng Cūn),
Jianghai (江海村, Jiānghǎi Cūn),
Minyong (民永村, Mínyǒng Cūn),
Mindong (民东村, Míndōng Cūn), and
Haihong (海鸿村, Hǎihóng Cūn).

== Infrastructure ==
Unlike Chongming and Changxing, Hengsha remains connected to the rest of Shanghai only by ferry service. There are plans for a small airport to be constructed.

== In popular culture ==
Hengsha is one of the main settings of the 2011 video game Deus Ex: Human Revolution, in which it is depicted as a major metropolitan area.

== See also ==
- Islands of Shanghai & of China
