= Huilong High School =

Middle school in Jiangsu, China

Huilong High School is a middle school in Jiangsu, China. It is considered a modern education technology experimental school. The school motto is "Advocate genuine knowledge, pursuit outstanding".

== History ==
In the fall of 1956, the school was first established as Huilong Junior High School at Qidong 502 Renmin Road (现启东人民路502号). The school changed its address and name many times for the first fifty years. In 1989, a town was constructed, and the school changed its name to Huilong High School.

Construction of a new campus began in the spring of 2000 and was completed in August the same year. The school was appraised as one of the first key middle schools in Nantong (南通) in 1997, the key high school in Jiiangsu Province (江苏省) in 2001, and the first three star school in Jiangsu Province in March 2004.

The Huilong High School is the national green school, the Jiangsu advanced group and the Jiangsu province advanced school in moral education.

== Description ==
The school's floor space is approximately 181 mu, with an area of 55,000 square metres (590,000 sq ft). The school has about 66 high school classes, and almost 3292 students and more than 297 teachers. The school has a large library which usable floor area is 3200 square meters.

The school spirit is "diligence, innovation". The teacher spirit is "dedication, carefulness". The student spirit is "diligence, strictness, earnest".

== Athletics ==
Sports facilities include a ground track field, plastic playground, football field, basketball court, volleyball court and gym.

== Notable alumni ==
Shi Hairong, volleyball player

== Website ==
Huilong High School has its own website.
