= S7 Shanghai–Chongming Expressway =

Road in Shanghai, China

Shanghai–Chongming Expressway
- Huchong Expressway 沪崇高速公路

Route information
- Length: 28.7 km (17.8 mi)

Major junctions
- From: Shanghai S6 / Shanghai S20 in Baoshan District, Shanghai
- G1503 in Baoshan District
- To: G346 Yueluo Highway in Baoshan District

Location
- Country: China
- Province: Shanghai

Highway system
- Transport in China
← S6	→ S7

The S7 Shanghai–Chongming Expressway, commonly referred to as the Huchong Expressway (Chinese: 沪崇高速公路; pinyin: Hùchóng Gāosù Gōnglù) and designated S7, is an expressway in the city of Shanghai, China. The entire route runs within Baoshan District in the city of Shanghai, and was originally designated A13.

== Route ==
Location	km	mi	Exit	Name	Destinations	Notes
Shanghai S7
Baoshan District, Shanghai				Shanghai S6 / Shanghai S20		
Baoshan District, Shanghai				Bao'an Highway		
Baoshan District, Shanghai				G1503		
Baoshan District, Shanghai				G346 Yueluo Highway		
Closed/former; Concurrency terminus; HOV only; Incomplete access; Tolled; Route transition; Unopened
