= Shanghai Yangtze River Tunnel and Bridge =

Fixed link between Chongming Island and Pudong, eastern China

Shanghai Yangtze River Tunnel
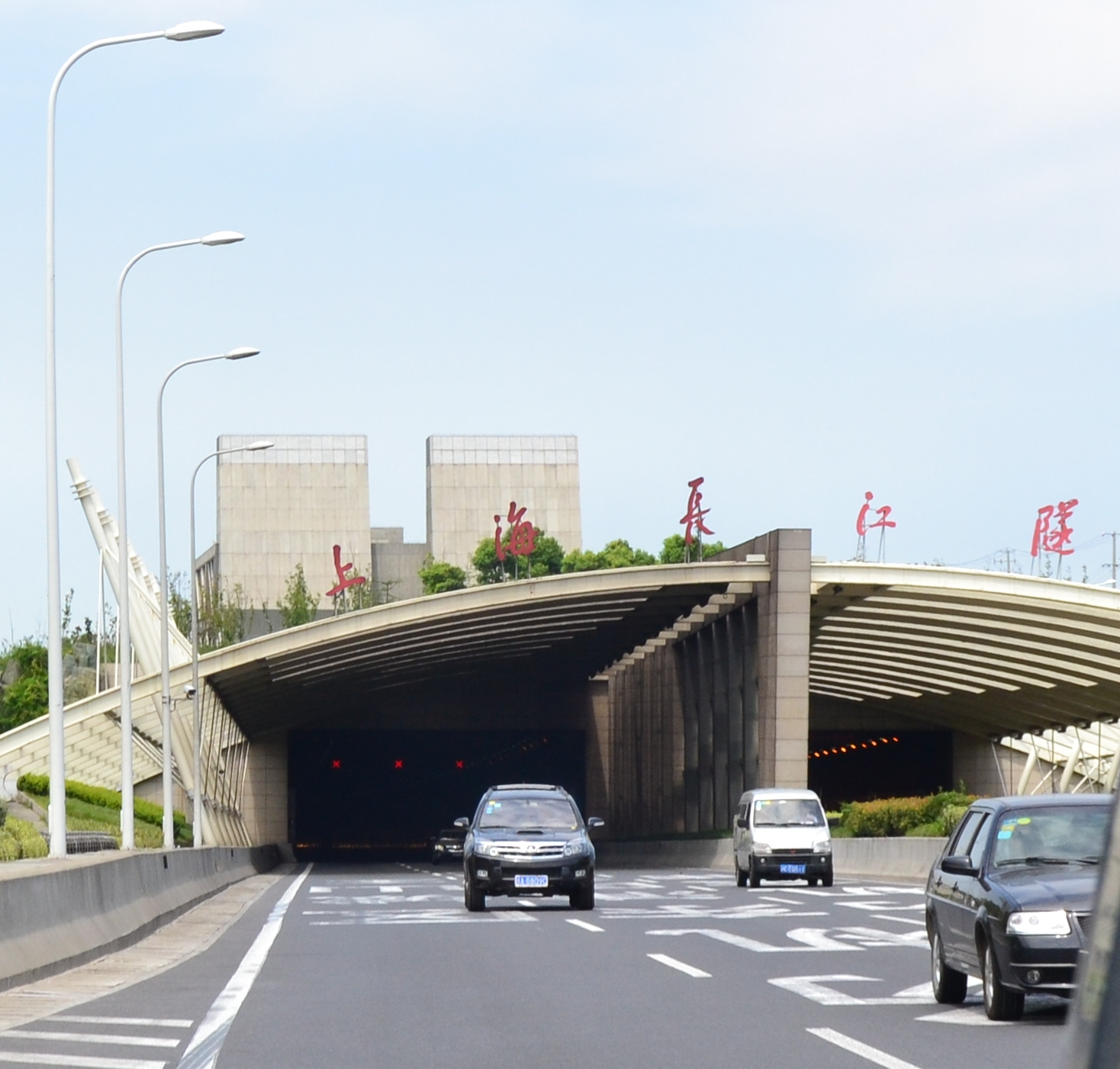
- Entrance to the tunnel
- Interactive map of Shanghai Yangtze River Tunnel

Overview
- Location: Shanghai
- Coordinates: 31°20′56″N 121°41′34″E
- Start: Wuhaogou, Pudong
- End: Changxing Island

Operation
- Constructed: 2005 - 2009
- Opened: 31 October 2009
- Operator: Shanghai Yangtze River Tunnel and Bridge Construction and Development

Technical
- Length: 8.9 kilometres (5.5 mi)
- No. of lanes: 2 x 3

The Shanghai Yangtze River Tunnel and Bridge (simplified Chinese: 上海长江隧桥; traditional Chinese: 上海長江隧橋; pinyin: Shànghǎi Chángjiāng Suì Qiáo) is a bridge–tunnel complex across the south fork of the Yangtze River near the river mouth in Shanghai. The tunnel connects the Pudong District of Shanghai on the south bank of the river with Changxing Island, while the bridge connects Changxing Island with Chongming Island. In combination with the Chongqi Bridge (opened in December 2011), which connects Chongming Island to the north bank of the Yangtze, the bridge–tunnel complex forms the final crossing of the Yangtze before it empties into the East China Sea.

The bridge and tunnel were built from 2005 to 2009 at a cost of 12.6 billion yuan (US$1.84 billion), and opened on 31 October 2009. Their combined length is 25.5 km (15.8 mi), forming part of the G40 Shanghai–Xi'an Expressway.

== Tunnel ==
The Shanghai Yangtze River Tunnel starts on the south bank of the Yangtze at Wuhaogou, Pudong and ends in the south of Changxing Island. It is 8.9 kilometres (5.5 mi) in length, and has two stacked levels. The upper level is for a motorway, and has three lanes in each direction, with a designed speed of 80 kilometres per hour (50 mph). The lower level is reserved for a future Shanghai Metro line, Chongming Line.

The tunnelling was completed using four tunnel boring machines, the largest of which was 15.43 metres (50.6 ft) in diameter, 135 metres (443 ft) long, and weighed 2,300t.

== Bridge ==
Shanghai Yangtze River Bridge 上海长江大桥
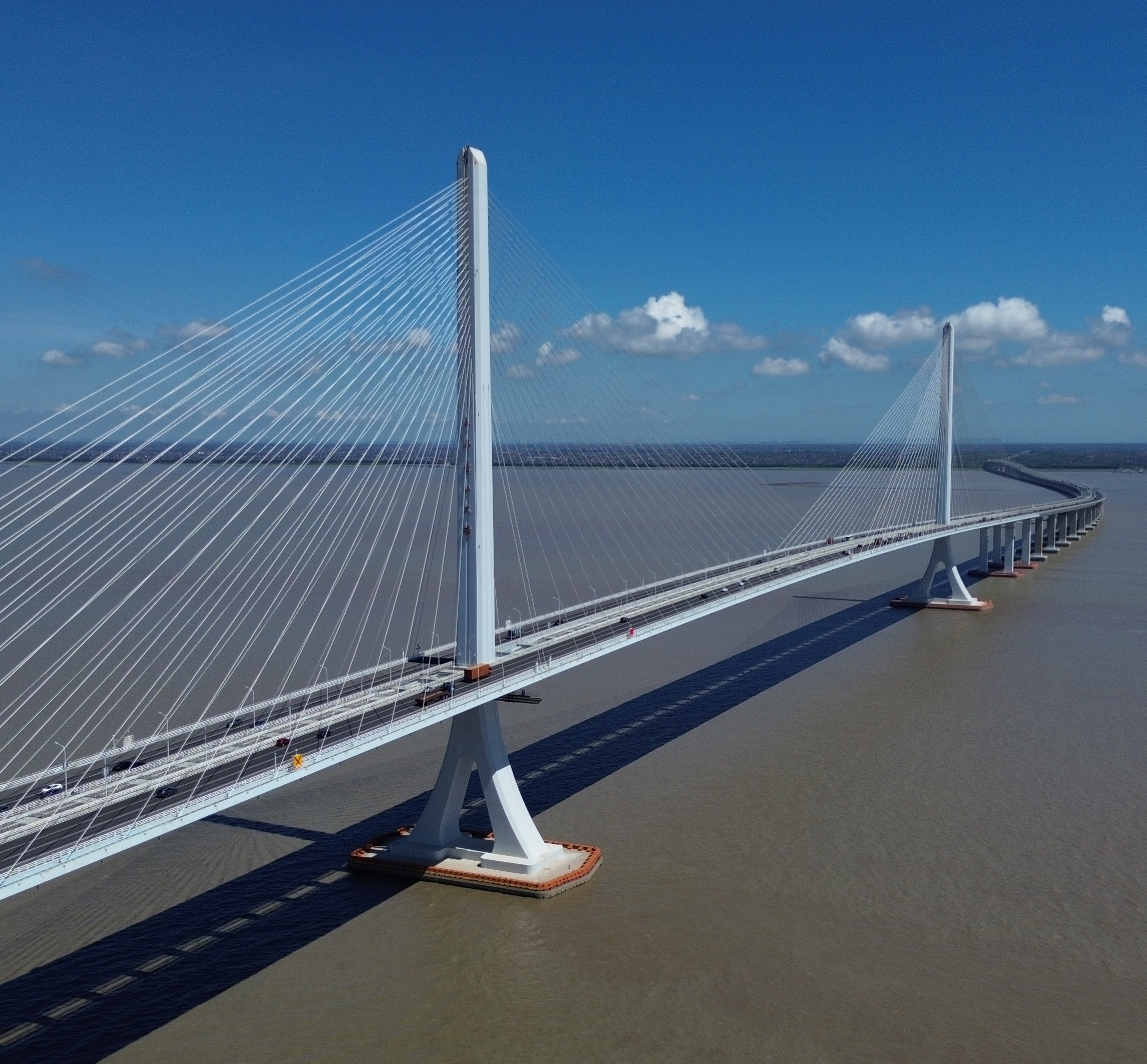
- Shanghai Yangtze River Bridge
- Coordinates: 31°26′04″N 121°44′37″E
- Crosses: Yangtze River between Changxing and Chongming islands
- Locale: Shanghai; China
- Maintained by: Shanghai Yangtze River Tunnel and Bridge Construction and Development

Characteristics
- Design: Cable-stayed bridge with viaducts
- Total length: 9,966 m (32,697 ft)
- Width: 51.5 m (169 ft)
- Height: 212.3 m (697 ft)
- Longest span: 730 m (2,395 ft)
- No. of spans: 1 cable-stayed span 2 viaducts

History
- Construction end: 23 Oct 2009
- Opened: 31 Oct 2009

Location
- Interactive map of Shanghai Yangtze River Bridge 上海长江大桥

The Shanghai Yangtze River Bridge starts at the tunnel exit, crosses Changxing Island at ground level, then crosses to Chongming Island, ending at Chenjia Town.

It consists of two long viaducts with a higher cable-stayed section in the middle to allow the passage of ships. The total length is 16.63 kilometres (10.33 mi), of which 6.66 kilometres (4.14 mi) is road and 9.97 kilometres (6.20 mi) bridge. The overall shape of the bridge is not linear but slightly sigmoid (S-shaped).

The central cable-stayed span is about 730 metres (2,395 ft), the longest span of any bridge in Shanghai, and the tenth longest cable-stayed span in the world. The span arrangement is 92+258+730+258+72 m.

The bridge has three road lanes in each direction, with a designed speed of 100 kilometres per hour (62 mph). Room on both flanks of the bridge is reserved for a future metro line, line 19, so total deck width is 35.3 m (115.8 ft).

== See also ==
- Bridges and tunnels across the Yangtze River
- List of bridges in China
- List of longest cable-stayed bridge spans
- List of tallest bridges in the world
- Hangzhou Bay Bridge, a bridge across the Hangzhou Bay connecting Jiangsu and Zhejiang provinces.
- Donghai Bridge, a bridge from Shanghai to the island of Yangshan and the Yangshan Deepwater Port in Hangzhou Bay.
- Yangpu Bridge, a cable-stayed bridge across Huangpu River in Shanghai.
- Lupu Bridge, an arch bridge across Huangpu River in Shanghai.
