= Lushi =

Lushi may refer to:

- Lushi County (卢氏县), Henan, China
- Lushi, Tianmen (卢市镇), town in Tianmen, Hubei, China
- Lushi (book) (路史), a Song dynasty book of history and mythology

Lüshi may refer to:

- Lüshi (poetry) (律詩) an eight-line regulated verse style form of Classical Chinese poetry

== See also ==
- Lüshi Chunqiu, an encyclopedic Chinese classic text
- Lusi (disambiguation)
