= Chongming Island =

Third-largest island in China

Native name: 崇明岛
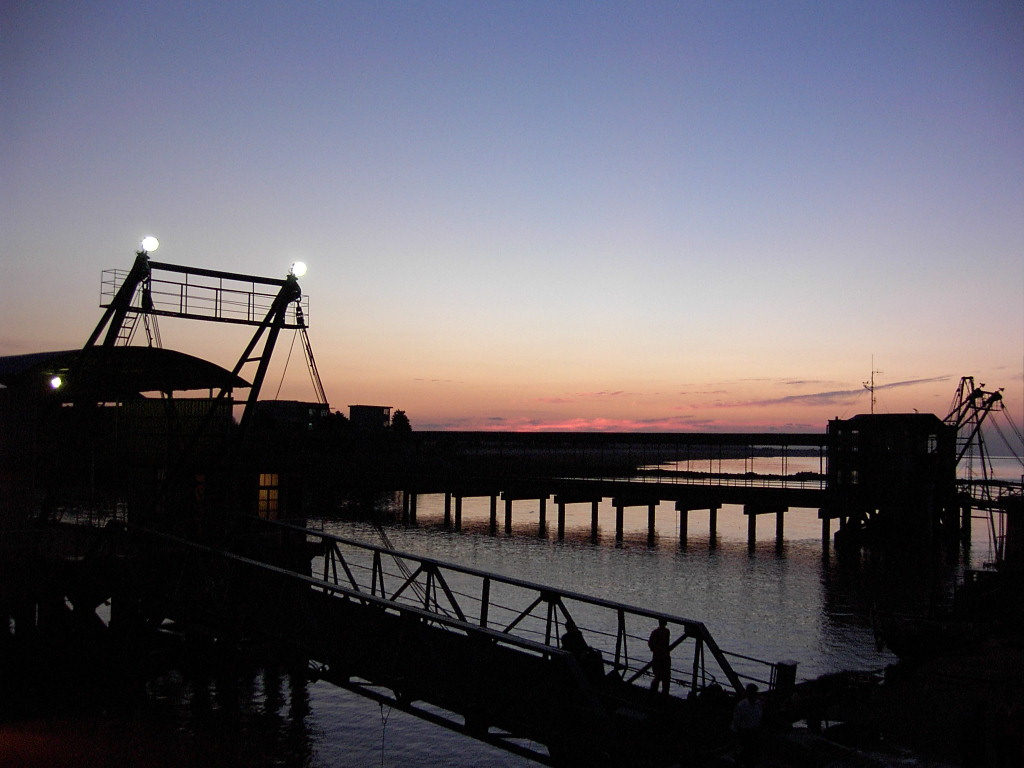
- Buzhendock

- The position of Chongming (red) within Shanghai (Note that this map does not display Haiyong or Qilong)

- Location within China Location within Shanghai

Geography
- Location: Pacific Ocean
- Coordinates: 31°40′N 121°32′E

Administration
- China
- Municipality: Shanghai

Chongming
- Traditional Chinese: 崇明島
- Simplified Chinese: 崇明岛
- Literal meaning: Lofty Bright Island
Transcriptions
Standard Mandarin
- Hanyu Pinyin: Chóngmíng Dǎo
- Wade–Giles: Chʻung-ming Tao

Chongming (Chinese: 崇明岛), formerly romanized as Chungming, is an alluvial island at the mouth of the Yangtze River in East China covering 1,267 square kilometers (489 sq mi) as of 2010. Together with the islands Changxing and Hengsha, it forms Chongming District, the northernmost area of the provincial-level municipality of Shanghai. At the time of the 2010 Chinese census, its population was 660,000.

A 20-kilometer-long (12 mi) stretch of the north shore of the island is not part of Chongming District of Shanghai but are instead two pene-exclaves of Jiangsu, formed by the connection of Chongming to the formerly-separate island of Yonglongsha.

== Etymology ==
The island is named for Chongming, an early settlement on the island of Xisha that was named for its placement on relatively high and clear ground. (Note: Some folk etymologies trace it to chong's more usual meaning of "worshipped" or "respected", claiming that the island's formation began with the rafts that floated downriver following Sun En's failed revolt around AD 400 against the Eastern Jin dynasty. It first took the name Suiming—"furtive and bright"—before receiving a more dignified name as it stabilized during the Tang dynasty.)

== History ==
Present-day Chongming first developed as two separate shoals—Xisha and Dongsha—during the Wude Era (AD 618–626) of the Tang dynasty. These were initially about 70 kilometers (43 mi) apart and located south of the larger island of Dongbuzhou (t 東布洲, s 东布洲, p Dōngbùzhōu), which came to form part of the peninsula of Qidong in Jiangsu. Xisha was also known as Gujunsha. By the first year of Shenlong (705), a town was established on Xisha which was known as "Chongming". The number, size, and shapes of the islands fluctuated repeatedly over time and with the floods of the Yangtze: In the 3rd year of Tiansheng (1025), a new island arose a little to the northwest of Dongsha which became known as Yaoliusha from the surnames of its early settlers. In the first year of Jiangzhong Jingguo (1101), Sansha rose for the third time, stabilizing 50 Chinese miles northwest of Yaoliusha. During the 12th- and 13th-century Yuan dynasty, Yingqiansha, Matuosha, Zhangpusha, and around six other islands also formed. The early settlers of these islands were mostly fishermen and salt collectors, with their principal saltern at Tianci.

In the 14th year of Zhiyuan (1277) under Kublai Khan of the Yuan, Chongming Prefecture was organized within Yangzhou. Owing to the shifting sands of the islands, however, the county seat needed to be repeatedly moved. During the late Yuan and early Ming, the sparsely-inhabited shoals of the area began to fill with migrants from Pudong and other areas of Songjiang Prefecture. These immigrants introduced cotton cultivation, which spread widely prior to China's opening to international trade in the later Qing. There was small-scale textile production in the area, but most of the cotton was exported for use in Songjiang, Hangzhou, and other more developed areas of Jiangnan. In the 2nd year of Hongwu (1396) under the Ming, the prefecture was downgraded to a county but, shortly afterwards, a major subsidence—sinking the entirety of Dongsha and most of Xisha—provoked a mass emigration back to the mainland. Around the same time, however, Sansha expanded towards the north while Yaoliusha simultaneously eroded in the south while building up in the north, "migrating" it towards Sansha.

Chongming County was later placed in Suzhou and then Taicang Prefectures. Over the course of the Ming, numerous shoals arose in succession: Ma'ansha, Chen'ensha, Gaomingsha, Xiaoyinsha, Changsha, Yuanjiasha, Xiangsha, Gaotousha, and around 20 others. Over the two hundred years from the beginning of Jiajing (1522) under the Ming to the end of Kangxi (1722) under the Qing, these shoals frequently flooded or collapsed back into the river. Yaoliusha and Sansha eroded away; Xisha, Chenensha, Fanliansha, and others sank. In the west, Pingyangsha arose, then sank, then finally merged with nearby Yuanjiasha, Wujiasha, Xiangsha, and Nansha. Around the end of the Ming dynasty in 1644, these islands were merged all the way to Gaotousha in the west, forming a single mass 200 Chinese miles east to west by 40 north to south. Their unification with remaining nearby islands by 1681 effectively created present-day Chongming, although it remained much smaller at the time. Between the Shunzhi and Kangxi Eras (1644–1722), Rilongsha, Yongansha, Ping'ansha, Dongsansha, and around 25 others arose without sinking.

Under the Republic, it was organized first under the Nantong and then Songjiang Special Administration District. During the Second World War, Chongming was administered first by a separate pacification team, then as part of Shanghai's Great Way Government, and finally as a county of the Wang Jingwei regime, a Japanese puppet state in Nanjing. Nine years after the establishment of the People's Republic of China, it was placed under the municipality of Shanghai in December 1958. During the Down to the Countryside Movement, many of the sent-down youth from Shanghai travelled no further than Chongming. Reclamation, particularly large-scale work on the island's northern and eastern tidal flats in the 1960s and 1990s, doubled the size of the island between 1950 and 2010. It began to absorb the separate island of Yonglongsha—creating an enclave of Jiangsu on the northern shore of the island—in 1972.

Dongtan was a proposed ecocity which was planned to open along with the 2010 World Expo in Shanghai but stalled following the 2006 ouster of the Communist Party Chief Chen Liangyu.

== Geography ==
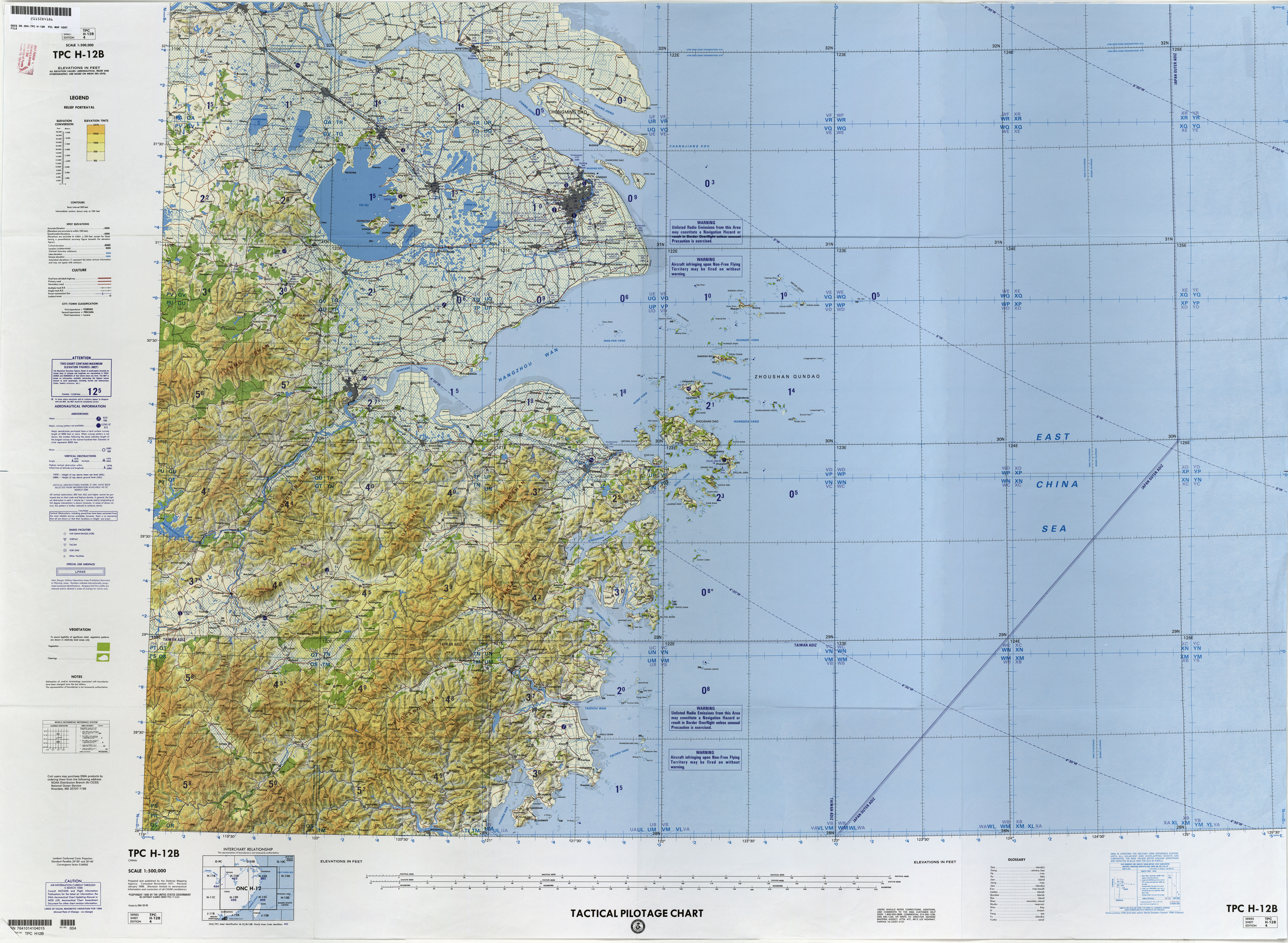
Map including Chongming Island

Chongming is about 81 kilometers (50 mi) running east and west and generally between 13 and 18 kilometers (8.1 and 11.2 mi) north to south, covering 1,267 square kilometers (489 sq mi). The island has an average elevation of 1.6–2.6 meters (5 ft 3 in – 8 ft 6 in) above sea level, with the northwest and central areas somewhat higher than the southwest and eastern ones.

=== Location ===
Chongming is located in the Yangtze River, dividing the river into northern and southern channels immediately prior to its entrance into the East China Sea. The island forms the northernmost part of the municipality of Shanghai, separated by the Yangtze from Baoshan and Pudong New Area, which face each other across the mouth of the Huangpu. In Jiangsu, most of Haimen and Qidong are separated from Chongming by the northern channel of the Yangtze; Taicang County, meanwhile, lies across the southern channel next to Shanghai's Baoshan District.

Chongming is about two hours' distance from central Shanghai.

=== Enclaves ===
Owing to the continuous expansion of the island, there are two pene-exclaves of Jiangsu present on the north shore of Chongming Island. The island of Yonglongsha appeared in the north channel of the Yangtze most recently in 1937 and was stabilized and expanded by workers from Nantong in Jiangsu during the late 1960s. Administration of the island was divided between Nantong's cities of Haimen and Qidong. Farms and then townships were established in both areas. Qidong's community of Qilong was connected in 1972 and Haimen's Haiyong township joined separately in 1975. Haiyong is now around 12.5 km^{2} (5 sq mi) while Qilong now stretches along 20 kilometers (12 mi) of the north shore of the island. As it is usually only about 1.5 km (0.93 mi) wide, however, its area is only around 36.8 km^{2} (14.2 sq mi).

== Environment ==
Efforts to improve water quality in local areas successfully resulted in notable recoveries. Furthermore, stable numbers of endangered finless porpoises, have been discovered along the island where two subspecies may occur.

== Landmarks ==
Under its poetic name of Yingzhou, various locales around the island were treated as its "8 views" during the Ming and Qing dynasties.

Today, Dongping National Forest Park is located in the central part of the island. Dongping Forest Farm was established in 1959, opened to the public in 1989, and became a nationally protected area in 1993. It is Shanghai's largest forest park, with artificially-planted trees covering 3.55 square kilometers (1.37 sq mi). The island is also home to the Dongtan Nature Reserve and the Chongxi Wetland Park, as well as the Chongming National Geological Park.

== Tourism ==
The county runs two 4A-class attractions and four 3A-class attractions. The tourism of the island focuses on three zones - East Chongming, Central Chongming and West Chongming. East Chongming features Dongtan Wetland Park and agritainment options in Yingdong Village and Nanjiang Village. Central Chongming features Dongping National Forest Park, agritainment options at Qianwei Village, Gaojia Zhuangyuan and Ruihua Orchard, Genbao Football Base, Chongming Xuegong (Chongming Museum), Jinaoshan Park, Shou'an Temple and Sanmin Cultural Village. West Chongming offers Mingzhu Lake Park, Xiling Resort, Xisha Wetland and agritainment at Lugang Village.

== Economy ==
Chengqiao's 10-square-kilometer (3.9 sq mi) Chongming Industrial Zone was established in March 1994 and promoted to municipal status in February 1996. It lies west of the town center and north of Nanmen Port.

Chongming is also a center of Shanghai's shipbuilding and maritime equipment industries, whose main base is on nearby Changxing.

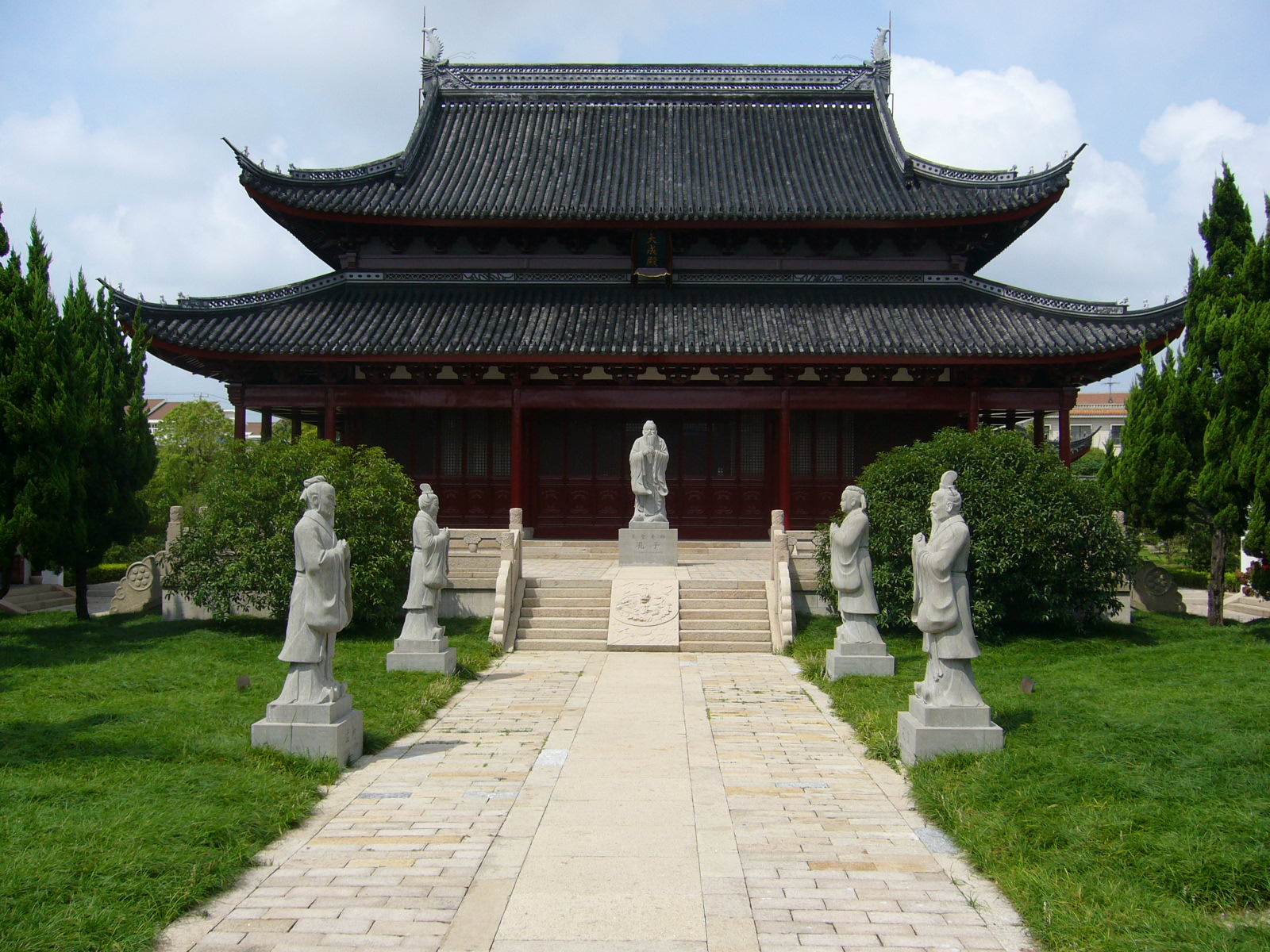
Chongming Confucian Temple

== Culture ==
Chongming boasts one of Shanghai's three Confucian temples, along with Shou'an and Hanshan Temples, Mount Jin'ao, and the tomb of Tang Yicen.

Annual festivals on Chongming include the Shanghai Chongming Forest Travel Festival, Chongming Hairy Crab Festival, the Mingzhu Lake Cup Fishing Competition, the Qianwei Autumn Ecological and Cultural Festival, the Shanghai Fishermen Fun Festival, and the Chongming Cook Stove Painting Festival. The Yu Sheng Cup, a national cricket fighting tournament, is held annually outside the Xilai Ranch in Lühua during the National Day holiday in early October, with a purse of 10,000 rmb.

The Tour of Chongming Island is an annual elite international women's cycling race consisting of a one-day race and a stage race.

== Government ==
Administratively, the Shanghai side of Chongming Island is divided among 15 towns and 1 township of Chongming County. The township of Xincun (新村乡) occupies the northernmost corner of the island. From northwest to southeast, the towns are Xinhai (新海镇), Lühua (绿华镇), Sanxing (三星镇), Miaozhen (庙镇), Dongping (东平镇), Gangxi (港西镇), Jianshe (建设镇), Chengqiao (城桥镇), Xinhe (新河镇), Shuxin (竖新镇), Gangyan (港沿镇), Buzhen (堡镇镇), Xianghua (向化镇), Zhongxing (中兴镇), and Chenjia (陈家镇). The Jiangsu side of the island is divided into Haiyong Township and Qilong Township.

A map of Shanghai's major arteries, including the completed Hushan and proposed Huchong Expressways to Chongming.

== Infrastructure ==
Whereas the island was previously connected to the mainland only by ferry service, the Shanghai Yangtze Bridge and Tunnel now connects Chenjia in southeastern Chongming with Shanghai via Changxing and the Chongqi Bridge connects Chenjia to Qidong in southeastern Jiangsu. The Chonghai Bridge under construction will link Xinhai at the west end of the island with Haimen District in Nantong, Jiangsu, while the proposed S7 (Huchong) Expressway would connect Chengqiao directly with Baoshan across the Yangtze.

The new bridges form part of the G40 (Hushan) Expressway connecting Shanghai and Xi'an. Chongming is also spanned by another 38 highways. The two major highways of the island run along its length, Beiyan Highway to the north and Chenhai Highway to the south. There are 41 bus lines in Chongming County, accessing over 98% of its 227 communities.

Eighteen ferries still connect the island. Chengqiao's Nanmen Port offers service to Shidongkou and Baoyang Rd in Baoshan and to Liuhegang in southern Jiangsu; Xinhai's Niupeng Harbor to Qinglonggang in Haimen; and other ports offer connections with Wusong and the two other islands of the county, Changxing and Hengsha.

Shanghai Metro Line 22 will connect the island with the rest of Shanghai in 2026.

== See also ==
- Chongming District
- Islands of Shanghai
