= Qidong, Jiangsu =

Qidong 启东市 Chitung
- County-level city
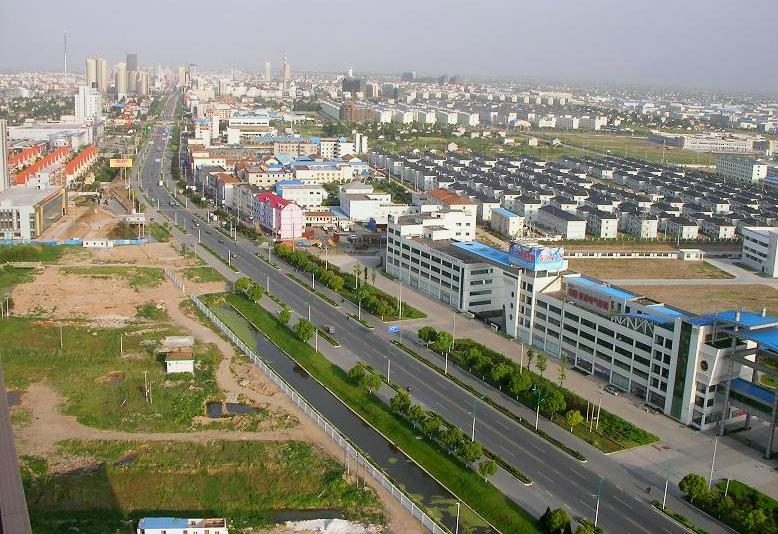
- Looking southeast on the city, with downtown at the upper left (2007)

- Location in Jiangsu
- Coordinates: 31°52′12″N 121°42′11″E
- Country: People's Republic of China
- Province: Jiangsu
- Prefecture: Nantong

Area
  - Total: 1,208 km^{2} (466 sq mi)

Population (2020 census)
  - Total: 967,313
  - Density: 800.8/km^{2} (2,074/sq mi)
- Time zone: UTC+8 (China Standard)
- Postal Code: 226200

Qidong
- Simplified Chinese: 启东
- Traditional Chinese: 啓東
Transcriptions
Standard Mandarin
- Hanyu Pinyin: Qǐdōng

Qidong is a county-level city under the administration of the prefecture-level city of Nantong in southeastern Jiangsu province, China. It is located on the north side of the Yangtze River opposite Shanghai and forms a peninsula jutting out into the East China Sea. It has a population of 967,313 in 2020.

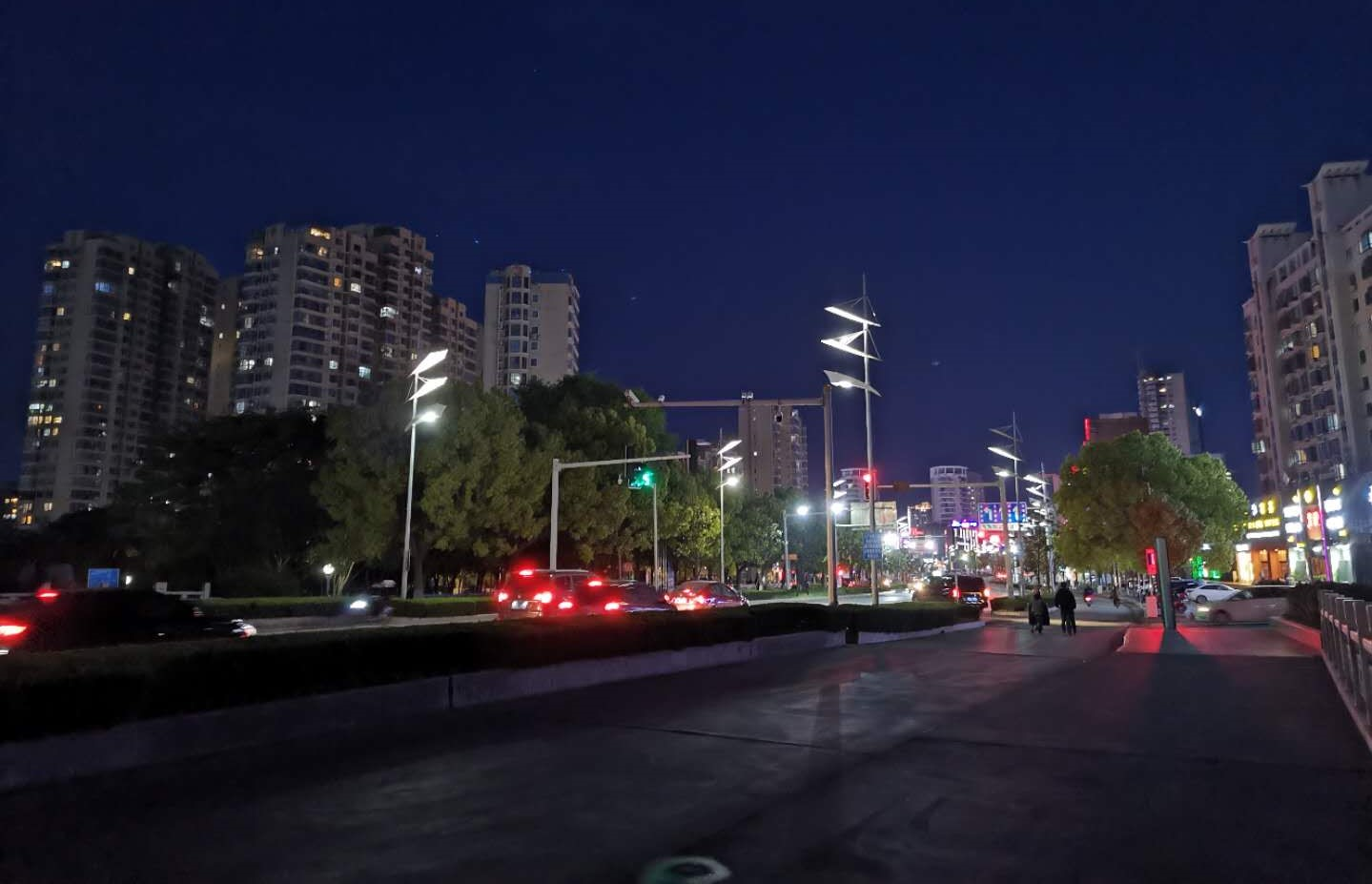
Qidong city night view

The center of the city is named Huilong Township. It also has a well-known fishing port called Lüsi town, named after Lü Dongbin, one of the eight immortals, who is said to have visited the place four times. Qidong's Qilong township was formerly a separate island in the Yangtze called Yonglongsha but now forms a pene-enclave on Chongming Island, most of which belongs to Shanghai.

== History ==
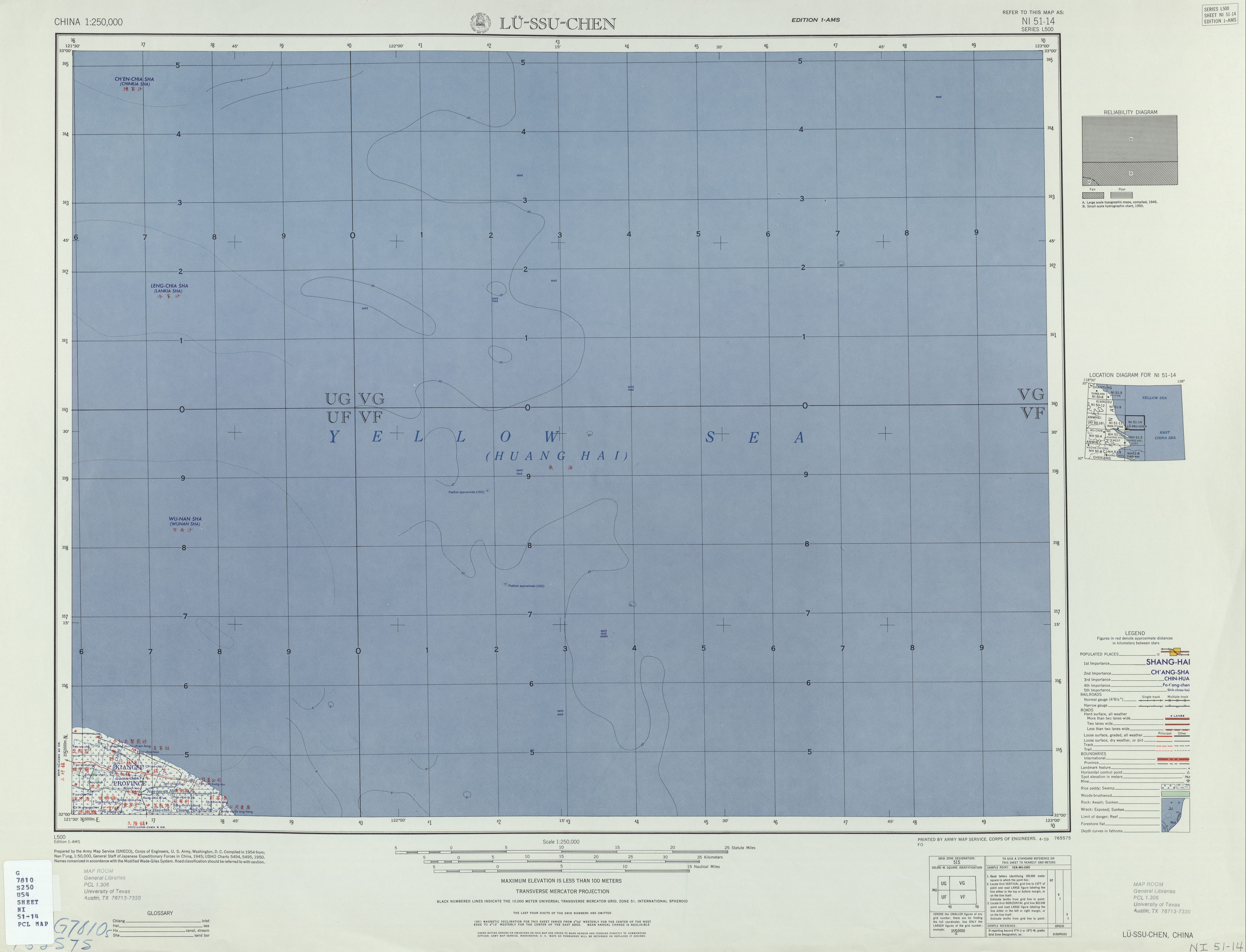
Lüsi Town (labeled as Lü-ssu-chen 呂四鎭) (1954)

The area of present-day Qidong was part of the East China Sea until the Han dynasty, when deposition from the Yangtze River began to form islands, notably including Dongbuzhou (t 東布洲, s 东布洲, p Dōngbùzhōu) at the site of present-day Lüsi.

In the Tang dynasty, prisoners were sent to Qidong and worked on salt production.

During the Five Dynasties and Ten Kingdoms period, the first official government, called Lüsi chang, was established.

During the transition period of the Yuan dynasty and Qing dynasty, the Yangtze River's main waterway moved northward and resulted in a large area of land loss in Lüsi chang. Lüsi chang was merged into Tongzhou.

Increasing sediment accumulation bordered Qidong with the mainland during the Qing dynasty.

In the first year of the Republic of China, Tongzhou was renamed to Nantong. Later, Qidong was governed by Nantong, Haimen, and Chongming.

On March 1, 1928, Qidong County was established with a population of around 330,000 residents.

By November 1989, significant progress was made in urbanization and the Chinese State Council permitted the promotion of Qidong from a county to a county-level city.

On November 16, 2021, three female secondary students committed suicide; the current circumstances of three girls are not certain.

== Administrative divisions ==
At present, Qidong City has 11 towns and 1 township.

11 towns

- Huilong (汇龙镇)
- Nanyang (南阳镇)
- Beixin (北新镇)
- Wangbao (王鲍镇)
- Hezuo (合作镇)
- Haifu (海复镇)
- Jinhai (近海镇)
- Yinyang (寅阳镇)
- Huiping (惠萍镇)
- Donghai (东海镇)
- Lüsigang (吕四港镇)

1 township

- Qilong (启隆乡)

== Climate ==
There are four distinct seasons: spring, summer, fall, and a mild winter. During the summer, monsoon lasts for weeks, and there is plenty of rain.

Climate data for Qidong, elevation 3 m (9.8 ft), (1991–2020 normals, extremes 1981–present)
Month	Jan	Feb	Mar	Apr	May	Jun	Jul	Aug	Sep	Oct	Nov	Dec	Year
Record high °C (°F)	20.3 (68.5)	24.8 (76.6)	31.6 (88.9)	32.5 (90.5)	35.8 (96.4)	36.0 (96.8)	38.3 (100.9)	37.6 (99.7)	37.1 (98.8)	33.2 (91.8)	27.2 (81.0)	21.6 (70.9)	38.3 (100.9)
Mean daily maximum °C (°F)	7.7 (45.9)	9.4 (48.9)	13.4 (56.1)	19.0 (66.2)	24.2 (75.6)	27.0 (80.6)	31.3 (88.3)	31.0 (87.8)	27.4 (81.3)	22.7 (72.9)	17.1 (62.8)	10.6 (51.1)	20.1 (68.1)
Daily mean °C (°F)	3.8 (38.8)	5.3 (41.5)	9.0 (48.2)	14.2 (57.6)	19.5 (67.1)	23.3 (73.9)	27.5 (81.5)	27.4 (81.3)	23.6 (74.5)	18.4 (65.1)	12.7 (54.9)	6.3 (43.3)	15.9 (60.6)
Mean daily minimum °C (°F)	0.7 (33.3)	1.9 (35.4)	5.4 (41.7)	10.1 (50.2)	15.6 (60.1)	20.3 (68.5)	24.7 (76.5)	24.7 (76.5)	20.5 (68.9)	14.6 (58.3)	8.9 (48.0)	2.8 (37.0)	12.5 (54.5)
Record low °C (°F)	−9.0 (15.8)	−7.3 (18.9)	−3.9 (25.0)	−0.7 (30.7)	6.4 (43.5)	12.0 (53.6)	17.1 (62.8)	16.7 (62.1)	10.9 (51.6)	2.8 (37.0)	−3.4 (25.9)	−8.2 (17.2)	−9.0 (15.8)
Average precipitation mm (inches)	60.7 (2.39)	55.6 (2.19)	80.4 (3.17)	78.2 (3.08)	80.6 (3.17)	199.5 (7.85)	137.0 (5.39)	187.3 (7.37)	108.6 (4.28)	68.9 (2.71)	57.0 (2.24)	43.0 (1.69)	1,156.8 (45.53)
Average precipitation days (≥ 0.1 mm)	9.9	9.4	11.6	10.4	10.9	13.7	11.5	12.1	10.1	7.7	8.7	7.9	123.9
Average snowy days	2.3	1.9	0.8	0	0	0	0	0	0	0	0.1	0.7	5.8
Average relative humidity (%)	78	78	78	78	79	84	84	84	81	76	77	75	79
Mean monthly sunshine hours	124.6	126.3	153.7	177.5	184.5	133.7	197.2	209.2	181.4	176.4	141.0	138.8	1,944.3
Percentage possible sunshine	39	40	41	46	43	32	46	51	49	50	45	44	44
Source: China Meteorological Administration

Climate data for Lüsigang Town (Lvsigangzhen), Qidong, elevation 4 m (13 ft), (1991–2020 normals, extremes 1981–2010)
Month	Jan	Feb	Mar	Apr	May	Jun	Jul	Aug	Sep	Oct	Nov	Dec	Year
Record high °C (°F)	19.8 (67.6)	25.1 (77.2)	26.3 (79.3)	31.7 (89.1)	33.9 (93.0)	36.9 (98.4)	37.5 (99.5)	37.5 (99.5)	37.6 (99.7)	32.3 (90.1)	27.7 (81.9)	21.2 (70.2)	37.6 (99.7)
Mean daily maximum °C (°F)	7.1 (44.8)	8.7 (47.7)	12.8 (55.0)	18.5 (65.3)	23.6 (74.5)	26.6 (79.9)	30.9 (87.6)	30.5 (86.9)	26.9 (80.4)	22.1 (71.8)	16.5 (61.7)	10.0 (50.0)	19.5 (67.1)
Daily mean °C (°F)	3.9 (39.0)	5.2 (41.4)	8.9 (48.0)	14.0 (57.2)	19.3 (66.7)	23.1 (73.6)	27.4 (81.3)	27.4 (81.3)	23.9 (75.0)	18.8 (65.8)	13.0 (55.4)	6.5 (43.7)	16.0 (60.7)
Mean daily minimum °C (°F)	1.2 (34.2)	2.5 (36.5)	5.8 (42.4)	10.4 (50.7)	15.8 (60.4)	20.5 (68.9)	24.7 (76.5)	24.9 (76.8)	21.3 (70.3)	15.8 (60.4)	9.8 (49.6)	3.5 (38.3)	13.0 (55.4)
Record low °C (°F)	−8.6 (16.5)	−6.7 (19.9)	−3.8 (25.2)	0.2 (32.4)	6.8 (44.2)	12.3 (54.1)	17.9 (64.2)	16.5 (61.7)	11.3 (52.3)	2.1 (35.8)	−2.4 (27.7)	−8.1 (17.4)	−8.6 (16.5)
Average precipitation mm (inches)	53.9 (2.12)	48.7 (1.92)	73.3 (2.89)	68.1 (2.68)	77.4 (3.05)	193.1 (7.60)	165.1 (6.50)	170.8 (6.72)	119.4 (4.70)	61.4 (2.42)	57.1 (2.25)	39.4 (1.55)	1,127.7 (44.4)
Average precipitation days (≥ 0.1 mm)	9.1	9.1	10.6	9.9	10.4	11.9	11.6	11.2	9.5	7.4	8.5	7.6	116.8
Average snowy days	2.2	2.0	0.7	0.1	0	0	0	0	0	0	0.1	0.9	6
Average relative humidity (%)	77	77	77	78	79	84	84	84	79	74	76	74	79
Mean monthly sunshine hours	140.0	142.0	170.7	195.4	205.1	161.5	215.2	231.2	197.7	192.6	155.7	152.8	2,159.9
Percentage possible sunshine	44	45	46	50	48	38	50	57	54	55	50	49	49
Source: China Meteorological Administration

== Education ==
Qidong is famous for its high school. Students from middle schools in Qidong usually get higher grades on the Gao Kao, China's national college entrance examination. Qidong has five public middle schools: Qidong Middle School, Huilong High School, Dongnan Middle School, Shiyi Middle School, and Lüsi Middle School. Among these schools, Qidong High School is the most prestigious. Qidong High School was established in 1928 and has been one of the best middle schools in Jiangsu province ever since. Over ninety percent of graduates from Qidong Middle School attend first-class universities every year.

== Language ==
People living in Lüsi town (Lusze) speak a different dialect—known as the Lüsi (吕四话; 呂四話; Lǚsì Huà) or Tongdong dialect (通东话; 通東話; Tōngdōng Huà)—from most other residents, who generally speak Qidong Dialect (启东话; 啓東話; Qǐdōng Huà). The two dialects are considerably different, and thus they are not mutually intelligible. Because most economical, educational, and governmental activities are held in the city capital Huilong, where Qidong Dialect is prevalent, many residents of Lüsi have learned to understand and even speak the majority dialect.

Qidong Dialect is a dialect of Wu Chinese. Some people consider it similar to Shanghainese, also a dialect of Wu Chinese. It is almost the same as the dialect spoken in Chongming District, which is under the administration of Shanghai.

Both of the two dialects belong to the Northern Wu. However, because of cultural differences between the two places, there still exist non-intelligible usage mostly in vocabulary.

== Infrastructure ==
Qidong Grand Theater: Qidong Grand Theater is located on the east side of Jianghai South Road and both sides of Qiantang River Road. It has a 1200-seat grand theater and a 408-seat small theater. The stage process design and mechanical equipment configuration of the grand theater can meet the requirements of various large-scale operas, dances, ballets, concerts, large-scale comprehensive literary and artistic performances while taking into account the conference function. The small theater can meet the needs of various purposes, such as small art performances, small drama performances, conferences, and so on.

Ningqi Railway: The railway is 365 km long, connecting Nanjing to Qidong. It connects the Xinchang Railway and Ningxi Railway, and strengthen the cargo transportation capacity between East China and West China. Qidong railway station has passenger services.

Chongqi Bridge: Chongqi Bridge is a river crossing channel connecting China to Shanghai and Jiangsu Province, located at the Yangtze River estuary. It was completed in 2011. Chongqi Bridge links Qidong with Chongming County and also downtown Shanghai, reducing the driving time from three hours to one hour. Qidong can be reached from Shanghai Pudong Airport within 45 minutes without traffic congestion.

Yuan Tuo Corner: It is China's largest freshwater wetland reserve. The Yangtze River entered the sea from here, and the East China Sea and the Yellow Sea are also Separate here.

== Economy ==
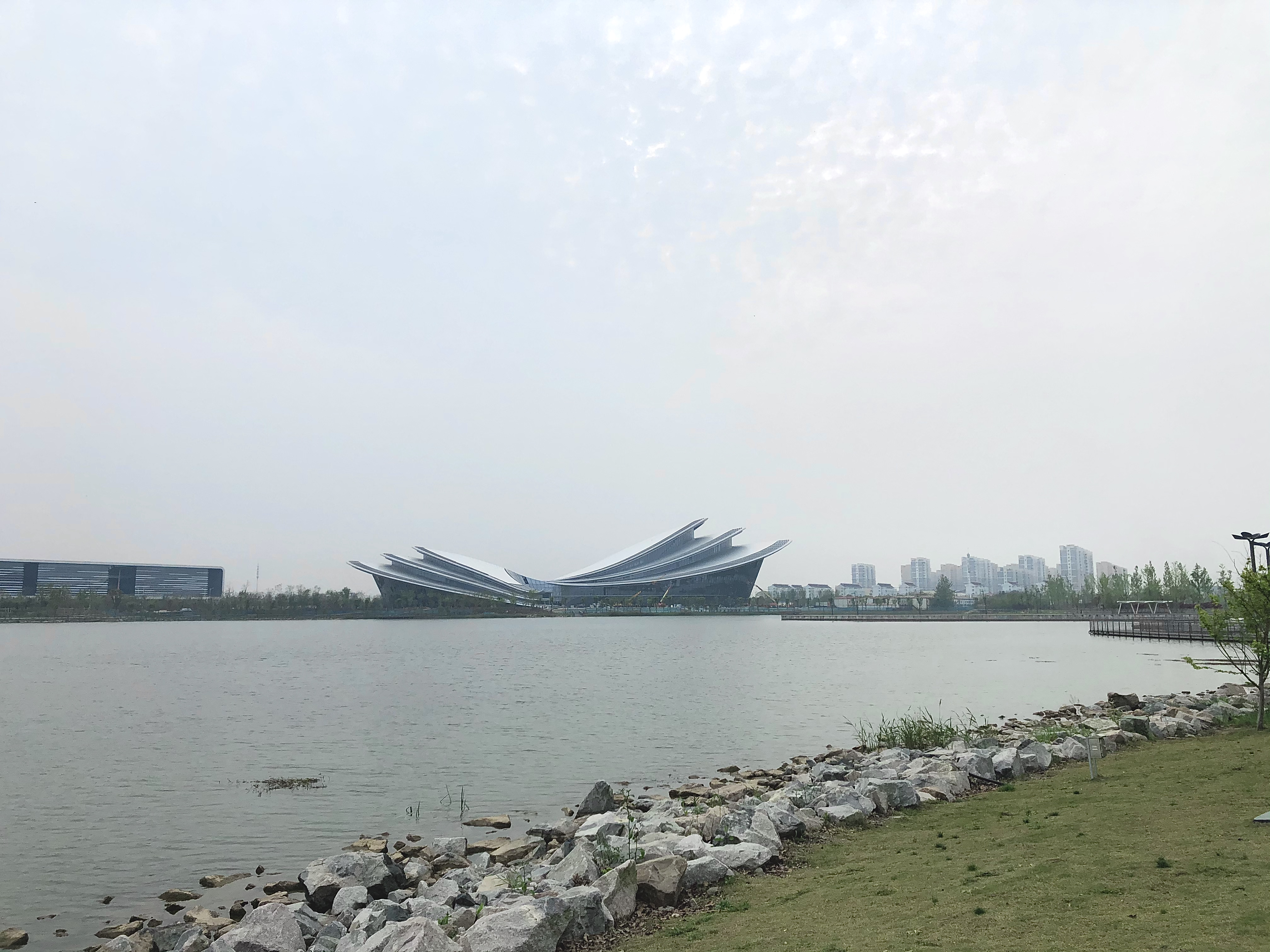
Qidong Grand Theater

Local industry focuses on pharmaceutical production, computer accessory production, and chemical fertilizer production.

Qidong is an offshore engineering & construction hub hosting companies like COSCO, SINOPACIFIC, Specialty Process Equipment Corporation (SPEC), Shanghai Zhen Hua Heavy Industries (ZPMC) Qidong Marine Engineering Company Limited (formerly DAODA Heavy Industry) and several other heavy industry, shipyard & fabrications facilities.

Major agriculture crops produced in the area include wheat, corn, soybeans, peanuts, yams, and cotton. The climate is suitable for pears, peaches, oranges, and watermelons.

Fishing is a major source of income for some rural residents.

== Notable people ==
- Shen Hongbing
- Chen Yu'ao

== Qidong protest ==
The Qidong protest happened in July 2012. It was a violent environmental protest against an industrial waste pipeline. A Japanese company called Oji Paper Company constructed a paper mill in the city of Nantong, Jiangsu. The wastewater from the factory would be emitted to the coast of Qidong. The rumors said that the Japanese company bribed the mayor, and the wastewater was going to pollute the drinking water of Qidong. In 2012, the Chinese have anti-Japanese sentiment because of the Senkaku Islands dispute, and the anti-Japanese demonstrations were breaking out country-wide. About 10,000 Qidong citizens ran out to the street and joined the protest, they crashed the cars and threw stones into the government building. Then approximately 1,000 protestors rushed into government buildings and smashed everything they could see. They also found fine liquors, condoms, and expensive watches in the building. The protest ended after a few days because of government intervention. Riot police were called in, and they stopped the demonstration in one day. In the following days, the organizers of the demonstration were arrested.
