= Chongming–Qidong Yangtze River Bridge =

Bridge across the Yangtze River in China

Coordinates: 31.7055°N 121.6626°E

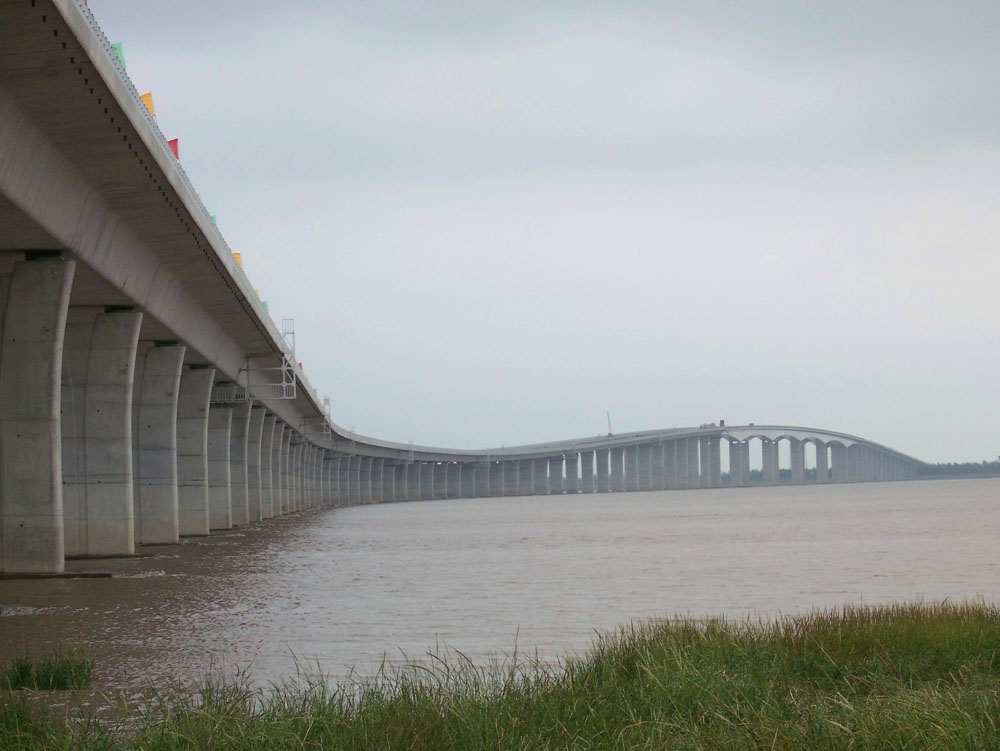
Chongqi Bridge

Chongming–Qidong Yangtze River Bridge or the Chongqi Bridge (Chinese: 崇启大桥; pinyin: Chóngqǐ Dàqiáo), also called Chongqi Crossing Project (Chinese: 崇启通道工程; pinyin: Chóngqǐ tōngdào gōngchéng), is a bridge across the north fork of the Yangtze River, near the river's mouth between Chongming Island of Shanghai and Qidong in Jiangsu Province. This bridge, along with the Shanghai Yangtze River Tunnel and Bridge to the south, forms the last crossing of the Yangtze River before the river empties into the East China Sea. The bridge carries the six-lane G40 Shanghai–Xi'an Expressway, part of the National Expressway Network of the People's Republic of China.

The bridge connects Chenjia in Chongming County in the south with Qidong in the north, and was built from 2008 to 2011 at cost of RMB8.238 billion. The project built 51.763 km (32 mi) of viaduct, including 6.84 km (4 mi) across the north fork of the river. As of December 2011, the bridge was the longest box girder bridge in China. The longest span is 185 meters. Major construction was completed on September 21, 2011, and the bridge opened to commercial traffic on December 24, 2011.

== See also ==
- Yangtze River bridges and tunnels
- Chonghai Bridge
