= Alfred Wyndham Lushington =

Anglo-Indian dendrologist (1860–1920)

Alfred Wyndham Lushington CIE (22 September 1860 – 25 March 1920) was an Anglo-Indian dendrologist born in Allahabad, India and who worked as a forest officer in the Madras Presidency.

== Publications ==
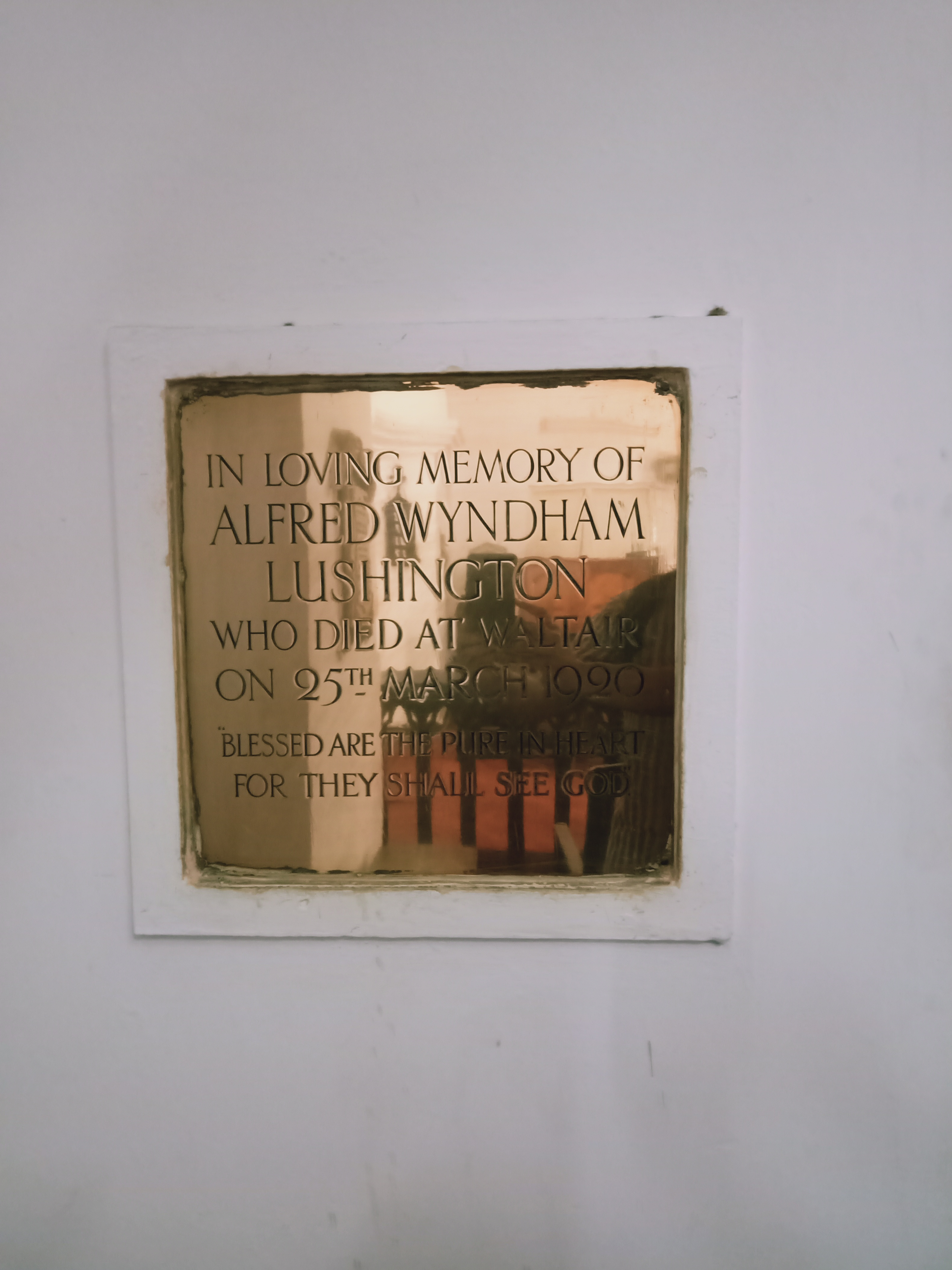
Memorial Tablet in Waltair

- 1910. The Genus Citrus. Indian Forester 36:323-53
- 1915. [Vernacular List of Trees, Shrubs & Woody Climbers in the Madras Presidency Vernacular List of Trees, Shrubs & Woody Climbers in the Madras Presidency]. Bilingual edition Tamil-English, 2 vols.
- 1918. Madras Timbers: their use in place of European timbers, with suggestions for their classification

=== Books ===
- 1919. Nature and Uses of Madras Timbers: Arranged in Categories Containing Similar Woods, & Critically Compared With Corresponding European & Philippine Timbers. Ed. S.P.C.K. Press. 358 pp.
