= Chenjia, Shanghai =

Town in Chongming District, Shanghai, China

Coordinates: 31°29′58.70″N 121°48′11.74″E

- Traditional Chinese: 陳家
- Simplified Chinese: 陈家
- Literal meaning: The Chen family
Transcriptions
Standard Mandarin
- Hanyu Pinyin: Chénjiā

Chenjia is a town in Chongming District, Shanghai, China. It lies in southeastern Chongming Island and is the site of the northern end of the Yangtze River Bridge, which connects Chongming to Changxing and the Yangtze Tunnel to Baoshan District in Shanghai.
