= Jinfeng =

Jinfeng may refer to:

== Places ==
=== Taiwan ===
- Jinfeng, Taitung (金峰鄉), a township in Taitung County

=== China ===
==== Districts ====
- Jinfeng District (金凤区), in Yinchuan, Ningxia

==== Towns ====
- Jinfeng, Jiulongpo District (金凤), in Jiulongpo District, Chongqing
- Jinfeng, Kaizhou District (金峰), in Kaizhou District, Chongqing
- Jinfeng, Fujian (金峰), in Fuzhou, Fujian
- Jinfeng, Jiangsu (锦丰), in Zhangjiagang, Jiangsu
- Jinfeng, Mianyang (金峰), in Mianyang, Sichuan
- Jinfeng, Nanchong (金凤), in Nanchong, Sichuan

==== Townships ====
- Jinfeng Township, Hunan (金凤乡), in Xinhua County, Hunan
- Jinfeng Township, Sichuan (金峰乡), in Jingyan County, Sichuan
- Jinfeng Township, Zhejiang (金峰乡), in Chun'an County, Zhejiang

==== Landmarks ====
- Jinfeng Gold Mine, a gold mine in Guizhou, China
- Jinfeng station, station on the Guangzhou metro
- Jinfeng Lu station, station on the Suzhou metro

== People ==
- Chen Jinfeng (893–935), empress consort of Min
- Liu Jinfeng (born 1977), Chinese biathlete
