= Yutian =

Yutian may refer to:

- Yutian County, Hebei (玉田县) in Tangshan, Hebei, China
- Yutian County, Xinjiang (于田县) in Hotan Prefecture, Xinjiang, China
- Yutian, Jiangxi (雩田镇), town in and subdivision of Suichuan County, Jiangxi, China
- Yutian, Fujian (玉田镇), town in and subdivision of Changle District, Fuzhou, Fujian, China
- The pre-Islamic Kingdom of Yutian (Khotan) in modern-day Xinjiang, China

== See also ==
- Yu Tian (余天; born 1947), Taiwanese politician
- Bell Yu Tian (Bell宇田; born 1982), Malaysian singer-songwriter
