= Shazhou =

Shazhou may refer to various places in China:

- Dunhuang, Gansu, historically known as Shazhou
- Zhangjiagang, Jiangsu, formerly Shazhou County
