= Chen Jiadong =

Chinese politician

- 陈家东

Chairman of the Standing Committee of the Xiamen Municipal People's Congress
- In office 13 January 2017 – 10 January 2022
- Preceded by: Zheng Daoxi
- Succeeded by: Yang Guohao

Communist Party Secretary of Zhangzhou
- In office August 2013 – December 2016
- Preceded by: Chen Dong
- Succeeded by: Tan Yunkun

Director of Fujian Provincial Forestry Department
- In office April 2010 – August 2013
- Preceded by: Wu Zhiming
- Succeeded by: Chen Zesheng

Mayor of Ningde
- In office June 2007 – April 2010
- Preceded by: Chen Rongkai
- Succeeded by: Liao Xiaojun

Personal details
- Born: August 1959 (age 67) Changle County, Fujian, China
- Party: Chinese Communist Party (1986–2022; expelled)
- Education: Central Party School of the Chinese Communist Party

Chinese name
- Simplified Chinese: 陈家东
- Traditional Chinese: 陳家東
Transcriptions
Standard Mandarin
- Hanyu Pinyin: Chén Jiādòng

Chen Jiadong (Chinese: 陈家东; born August 1959) is a former Chinese politician who spent his entire career in southwest China's Fujian province. He was investigated by China's top anti-graft agency in February 2022. Previously he served as chairman and party branch secretary of the Standing Committee of the Xiamen Municipal People's Congress, and before that, party secretary of Zhangzhou.

He was a delegate to the 11th and 13th National People's Congress. He was a member of the 9th and 10th CCP Fujian Provincial Committee.

== Biography ==
Chen was born in Changle County (now Changle District of Fuzhou), Fujian, in August 1959. He entered the workforce in September 1981, and joined the Chinese Communist Party (CCP) in April 1986.

He joined the Fujian Provincial Forestry Department in October 1995 and two years later was promoted to become its deputy director. In April 2005, he was named party secretary of Fu'an, his first foray into a municipal leadership role. In June 2007, he was promoted to acting mayor of Ningde, confirmed in December. In April 2010, he was recalled to the original Fujian Provincial Forestry Department as director. In August 2013, he was appointed party secretary of Zhangzhou, the top political position in the city, he remained in that position until December 2016, when he was transferred to Xiamen and appointed chairman and party branch secretary of the People's Congress.

=== Downfall ===
On 25 February 2022, he has been placed under investigation for "serious violations of discipline and laws" by the Central Commission for Discipline Inspection (CCDI), the party's internal disciplinary body, and the National Supervisory Commission, the highest anti-corruption agency of China. On August 30, he was expelled from the CCP and dismissed from public office.

Government offices
Preceded by Chen Rongkai	Mayor of Ningde; 2007–2010	Succeeded by Liao Xiaojun
Preceded by Wu Zhiming	Director of Fujian Provincial Forestry Department; 2010–2013	Succeeded by Chen Zesheng
Party political offices
Preceded by Chen Dong	Communist Party Secretary of Zhangzhou; 2013–2016	Succeeded by Tan Yunkun
Assembly seats
Preceded by Zheng Daoxi	Chairman of the Standing Committee of the Xiamen Municipal People's Congress; 2017–2022	Succeeded by Yang Guohao (杨国豪)
