= Liangfeng High School =

High school in Zhangjiagang, China

Liangfeng High School of Jiangsu Province 江苏省梁丰高级中学

Location
- Zhangjiagang, Jiangsu, People’s Republic of China

Information
- School type: High School
- Motto: 勤业、慎行
- Founded: 1848
- Status: Open
- Authority: Jiangsu Provincial Education Commission
- Website: www.jsslfzx.com

Liangfeng High School (Chinese 梁丰中学) is located in Zhangjiagang, Jiangsu Province, China. It was founded in 1848. It has several sports teams and clubs, such as Film Production Club, The Etiquette Club and Logo Designing. The school won the prize of advanced school on science, technology and education in Jiangsu Province.
