= Daxin, Jiangsu =

Daxin 大新镇
- Town
- Location in Jiangsu
- Coordinates: 31°58′22″N 120°32′38″E
- Country: People's Republic of China
- Province: Jiangsu
- Prefecture-level city: Suzhou
- County-level city: Zhangjiagang
- Time zone: UTC+8 (China Standard)

Daxin (Chinese: 大新; pinyin: Dàxīn) is a town under the administration of Zhangjiagang, Jiangsu, China. As of 2020, it has four residential communities and ten villages under its administration:

- Daxin Community
- Changxin Community (长新社区)
- Xindong Community (新东社区)
- Xinnan Community (新南社区)
- Daxin Village
- Duanshan Village (段山村)
- Chaodongweigang Village (朝东圩港村)
- Xinzha Village (新闸村)
- Xinhaiba Village (新海坝村)
- Longtan Village (龙潭村)
- Zhongshan Village (中山村)
- Qiaotou Village (桥头村)
- Changfeng Village (长丰村)
- Xinkai Village (新凯村)
