= Jinfeng Township, Sichuan =

Jinfeng Township 金峰乡
- Township
- Location in Sichuan
- Coordinates: 29°44′2″N 104°3′8″E
- Country: People's Republic of China
- Province: Sichuan
- Prefecture-level city: Leshan
- County: Jingyan County
- Time zone: UTC+8 (China Standard)

Jinfeng Township (simplified Chinese: 金峰乡; traditional Chinese: 金峰鄉; pinyin: Jīnfēng Xiāng) is a township under the administration of Jingyan County, Sichuan, China. As of 2018, it has one residential community and seven villages under its administration.

== See also ==
- List of township-level divisions of Sichuan
