= 2022 Tangshan restaurant attack =

2022 violent assault in BBQ restaurant in Tangshan, China

- Location: 39°38′43″N 118°10′02″E; Lubei District, Tangshan, Hebei, China
- Date: 10 June 2022
- Attack type: Assault
- Victim: Four women
- No. of participants: 9

On 10 June 2022, a group of men assaulted four women at a barbecue restaurant in Lubei District, Tangshan. Before dawn, a drunk man named Chen Jizhi (Chinese: 陈继志) attempted to sexually harass a woman. When the act was met with resistance, he became angry; Chen and several of his companions violently assaulted the four women.

Two suspects were arrested on 10 June; all nine suspects were arrested the following day. On 11 June, the case was investigated and handled by the Guangyang branch of the Langfang Public Security Bureau.

The surveillance footage was circulated on the Internet soon after the incident, causing extensive discussions on multiple social media platforms in China. People's Daily said it was not only a crime, but also challenged the public's sense of security. At the same time, it also sparked discussion about women's rights in China. After the incident was uploaded on the Internet, several real-name reports of Tangshan-related gangs also received attention.

== Attack ==
Chen Jizhi, described as a man in his forties, entered the barbecue shop and sexually harassed a young woman who was having barbecue with her friends. The woman's attempt at self-defense was met with violence. Seeing her friend assaulted, one of the women smashed a bottle on the head of the assailant. At this time, some of the assailant's companions left their outside dining seats and joined in on the assault.

The store owner, a woman in her sixties, attempted to verbally break up the fight, but was only able to move the fight outside as the initial female victim was dragged outside by her hair. The female victim was continuously assaulted in the form of kicking and punching that focused mostly on her head. Additionally, approximately 7–8 bottles had been smashed on her head. Other women at the restaurant attempted to rescue the beaten woman, but they were all assaulted by the group as other men watched. The battered women were left with serious head injuries. After the incident, nine suspects fled the scene.

== Victims ==
According to official reports, on 10 June, the four victims were treated for injuries at the Affiliated Hospital of North China University of Science and Technology. The condition of two of them was listed as stable and non-life-threatening, and they were said to have left the hospital prior to the official announcement. The two other women were hospitalized for treatment, and the hospital stated that one suffered serious mouth injuries and lost several teeth. On 12 June, The Paper was informed that the two hospitalized women still needed wheelchairs to enter and exit the ward, but visitation was prevented by hospital staff due to the COVID-19 pandemic. On 13 June, a reporter went to the hospital to investigate the treatment of the injured women, and hospital staff said that the women had been transferred from the intensive care unit to the general ward. The two women were also reportedly treated at the hospital's stomatology department after suffering severe trauma to the head. Earlier in the day, there were rumors on Weibo that one of the two beaten women had died; the Tangshan Women's Federation denied the rumors. As of 13 June, the two injured women were in stable physical condition.

On 20 June, the Shanghai Ministry of Justice Institute of Forensic Science issued a forensic opinion that the degree of injury to the hospitalized victims was minor (Grade 2) and the degree of injury to unhospitalized victims was minor. A police officer pointed out that the judicial appraisal of light and minor injuries is different from the general understanding, commonly known as "light injuries are not light, serious injuries are very serious"; according to the appraisal standards, light injuries are injuries that are moderately harmful to personal health.

== Arrests and official response ==
According to China Central Television, the police named "Chen" as the main suspect in the incident and claimed that he "recklessly used violence to commit evil."

Nine suspects, approved by the People's Procuratorate of Guangyang District, Langfang City, were officially arrested by the Guangyang Branch of the Langfang Public Security Bureau. On the evening of 10 June, the Tangshan Public Security Bureau Lubei Branch announced that two suspects involved in the case were arrested. In the early hours of 11 June, three more people involved in the case were arrested. With the assistance of the Jiangsu police, three people involved in the case were arrested at a checkpoint that morning. That afternoon, the last person involved in the case was arrested.

On 22 June, the civilization office of the Chinese Communist Party announced that Tangshan lost its title of National Civilized City, the highest honor for a city in China. In addition, police in many parts of China began to conduct summer night patrols, focusing on barbecue stalls and barbecue restaurants.

== Other reactions ==
On 11 June, a reporter noted that the barbecue restaurant was closed. Legal scholar Luo Xiang said that the incident if reported, could involve picking quarrels and provoking trouble and intentional assault.

China Women's Daily, People's Daily, China Central Television (CCTV), and Jun Zhengping Studio condemned the incident. Radio Free Asia criticized the government's censorship of online opinion on the incident and the news blackout, and accused the information of being opaque.

Weibo officially banned 265 accounts for "inciting gender antagonism"; Douyin and Kuaishou also punished offending accounts. A Southwest University of Political Science and Law student was given a warning by the university for speaking on the internet about "reviewing victims".

More than 40 celebrities, including Jackie Chan, Tsui Hark, and Hu Xijin, voiced their support for the battered women. Taiwanese member of South Korean (G)I-DLE, Yeh Shuhua, posted an article on Weibo criticizing the perpetrators of the violence as "scum". Zhang Yuqi was criticised for "promoting gender antagonism" when she posted an article criticizing the male bystanders and arguing that "all Chinese men should serve in the military".
