= Heshang, Changle =

Coordinates: 25.9421°N 119.5605°E

Heshan (Chinese: 鹤上; pinyin: Hèshàng) is a town located in the county-level city of Changle, Fuzhou City, Fujian Province, China.

A large part of the town's population lives abroad, mainly in New York City (Chinatown, Manhattan), Europe (Chinatowns in Europe), and Taiwan.

== See also ==
- List of township-level divisions of Fujian
