= National Civilized City =

Chinese Communist Party city award

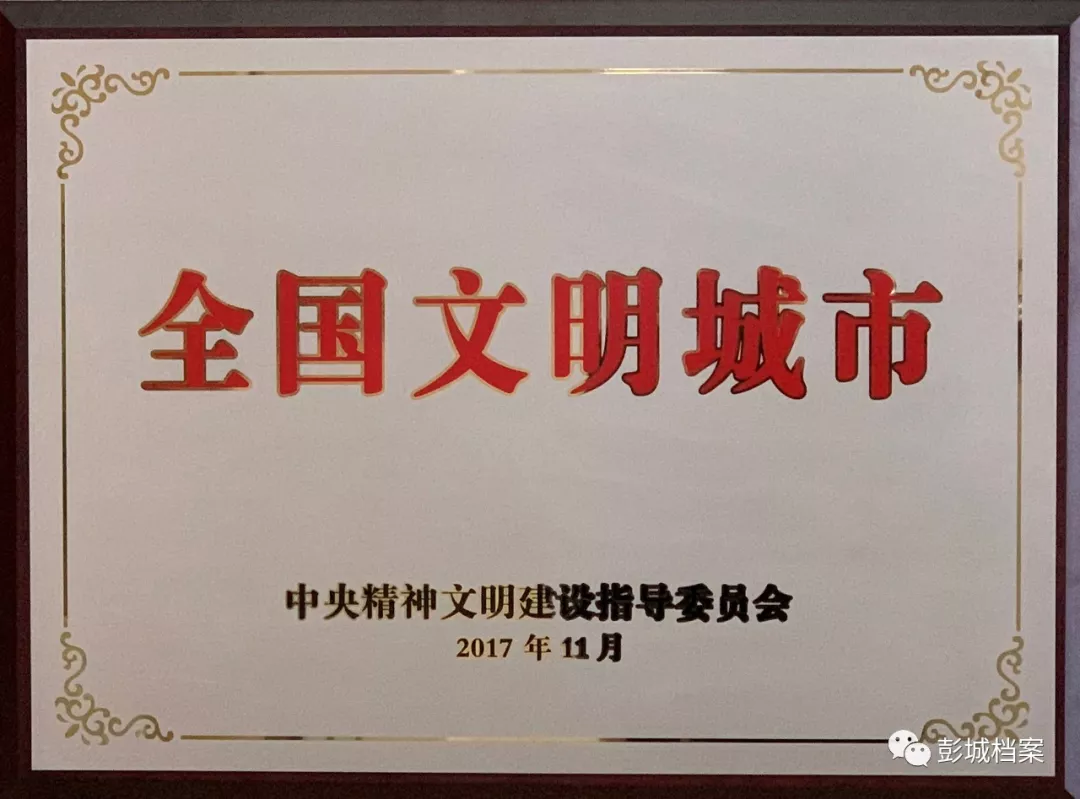
The National Civilized City plaque received by Fuzhou.

National Civilized City (Chinese: 全国文明城市; pinyin: Quánguó Wénmíng Chéngshì) is a title awarded by the Office of the Central Guidance Commission on Building Spiritual Civilization of the Chinese Communist Party (CCP) for achievements in economic development, governance, public services, social order and cultural life. It is considered the highest honor a city can receive in China and is particularly valued by the party committees and governments of the cities. As of 23 May 2025, a total of 505 cities, districts and counties have been awarded the title of National Civilized City.

== List ==
Since 2005, the Office of the Central Guidance Commission on Building Spiritual Civilization of the Chinese Communist Party has selected a batch of National Civilized Cities every three years; the first batch (12 cities), second batch (14 cities), third batch (27 cities), fourth batch (34 cities), fifth batch (89 cities), sixth batch (133 cities) and seven batch (202 cities). Starting from the second batch, each batch of selection reviewed the cities previously selected.

National Civilized Cities (286, including those that passed the review)
Province	City	Level	Batch	Second Batch Review	Third Batch Review	Fourth Batch Review	Fifth Batch Review	Sixth Batch Review	Seventh Batch Review
Fujian	Xiamen	Deputy provincial	1	✓	✓	✓	✓	✓	✓
Shandong	Qingdao	Deputy provincial	1	✗	✓	✓	✓	✓	✓
Liaoning	Dalian	Deputy provincial	1	✓	✓	✓	✓	✓	✓
Zhejiang	Ningbo	Deputy provincial	1	✓	✓	✓	✓	✓	✓
Guangdong	Shenzhen	Deputy provincial	1	✓	✗	✓	✓	✓	✓
Inner Mongolia	Baotou	Prefecture-level city	1	✓	✓	✓	✓	✓ (Resumed on October 9, 2021)	✓
Guangdong	Zhongshan	Prefecture-level city	1	✓	✗	✓	✓	✓	✓
Shandong	Yantai	Prefecture-level city	1	✓	✓	✓	✓	✓	✓
Tianjin	Heping	District	1	✓	✓	✓	✓	✓	✓
Shanghai	Pudong	Deputy provincial	1	✗	✓	✓	✓	✓	✓
Beijing	Xicheng	District	1	✓	✓	✓	✓	✓	✓
Jiangsu	Zhangjiagang	County-level city	1	✓	✓	✓	✓	✓	✓
Sichuan	Chengdu	Deputy provincial	2	—	✓	✓	✓	✓	✓
Jiangsu	Nanjing	Deputy provincial	2	—	✓	✗	✓	✓	✓
Guangxi	Nanning	Regional capital	2	—	✓	✓	✓	✓ (Resumed on July 15, 2021)	✓
Guangdong	Huizhou	Prefecture-level city	2	—	✓	✓	✓	✓	✓
Jiangsu	Nantong	Prefecture-level city	2	—	✓	✓	✓	✓	✓
Guangdong	Dongguan	Prefecture-level city	2	—	✓	✓	✓	✓	✓
Anhui	Ma'anshan	Prefecture-level city	2	—	✓	✓	✓	✓	✓
Jiangsu	Suzhou	Prefecture-level city	2	—	✓	✓	✓	✓	✓
Heilongjiang	Daqing	Prefecture-level city	2	—	✓	✗	✓	✗	✓
Beijing	Dongcheng	District	2	—	✓	✓	✓	✓	✓
Shanghai	Jing'an	District	2	—	✗	✓	✓	✓	✓
Chongqing	Yubei	District	2	—	✓	✓	✓	✓	✓
Xinjiang	Korla	County-level city	2	—	✓	✓	✓	✓	✓
Inner Mongolia	Manzhouli	County-level city	2	—	✓	✓	✓	✓ (Resumed on October 9, 2021)	✓
Hunan	Changsha	Provincial capital	3	—	—	✓	✓	✓	✓
Guangdong	Guangzhou	Deputy provincial	3	—	—	✗	✓	✓	✓
Fujian	Fuzhou	Provincial capital	3	—	—	✓	✓	✓	✓
Jilin	Changchun	Deputy provincial	3	—	—	✓	✓	✓	✓
Zhejiang	Hangzhou	Deputy provincial	3	—	—	✓	✓	✓	✓
Henan	Zhengzhou	Provincial capital	3	—	—	✓	✓	✓	✓
Tibet	Lhasa	Provincial capital	3	—	—	✓	✓	✓ (Resumed on August 19, 2021)	✓
Ningxia	Yinchuan	Provincial capital	3	—	—	✓	✓	✓	✓
Guizhou	Guiyang	Provincial capital	3	—	—	✓	✓	✓	✓
Shandong	Linyi	Prefecture-level city	3	—	—	✓	✗	✓	✓
Hunan	Changde	Prefecture-level city	3	—	—	✓	✓	✓	✓
Jiangsu	Yangzhou	Prefecture-level city	3	—	—	✓	✓	✓	✓
Shanxi	Changzhi	Prefecture-level city	3	—	—	✓	✓	✓	✗
Shandong	Zibo	Prefecture-level city	3	—	—	✓	✓	✓	✓
Inner Mongolia	Ordos	Prefecture-level city	3	—	—	✓	✓	✓	✓
Henan	Luoyang	Prefecture-level city	3	—	—	✓	✓	✓	✓
Sichuan	Mianyang	Prefecture-level city	3	—	—	✓	✓	✓	✓
Hubei	Yichang	Prefecture-level city	3	—	—	✓	✓	✓	✓
Hebei	Tangshan	Prefecture-level city	3	—	—	✓	✓	✗ (Revoked in June 2022)	✗
Guangdong	Jiangmen	Prefecture-level city	3	—	—	✓	✗	✗	✓
Zhejiang	Jiaxing	Prefecture-level city	3	—	—	✓	✓	✓	✓
Jiangsu	Changzhou	Prefecture-level city	3	—	—	✓	✓	✓	✓
Xinjiang	Karamay	Prefecture-level city	3	—	—	✓	✓	✗	✓
Beijing	Chaoyang	District	3	—	—	✓	✓	✓	✓
Shanghai	Changning	District	3	—	—	✓	✓	✓	✓
Chongqing	Yuzhong	District	3	—	—	✓	✓	✗	✓
Heilongjiang	Suifenhe	County-level city	3	—	—	✓	✓	✗	✓
Hubei	Wuhan	Deputy provincial	4	—	—	—	✓	✓	✓
Jiangxi	Nanchang	Provincial capital	4	—	—	—	✗	✓	✓
Heilongjiang	Harbin	Deputy provincial	4	—	—	—	✓	✓	✓
Anhui	Hefei	Provincial capital	4	—	—	—	✓	✓	✓
Shaanxi	Xi'an	Deputy provincial	4	—	—	—	✓	✗	✓
Liaoning	Shenyang	Deputy provincial	4	—	—	—	✓	✓	✓
Shandong	Weihai	Prefecture-level city	4	—	—	—	✓	✓	✓
Shandong	Weifang	Prefecture-level city	4	—	—	—	✓	✓	✓
Sichuan	Guang'an	Prefecture-level city	4	—	—	—	✓	✓	✓
Henan	Xuchang	Prefecture-level city	4	—	—	—	✓	✓	✓
Shandong	Dongying	Prefecture-level city	4	—	—	—	✓	✓	✓
Jiangsu	Zhenjiang	Prefecture-level city	4	—	—	—	✓	✓	✓
Zhejiang	Shaoxing	Prefecture-level city	4	—	—	—	✓	✓	✓
Henan	Puyang	Prefecture-level city	4	—	—	—	✓	✓	✓
Hunan	Yueyang	Prefecture-level city	4	—	—	—	✓	✓	✓
Gansu	Jinchang	Prefecture-level city	4	—	—	—	✓	✓	✓
Fujian	Sanming	Prefecture-level city	4	—	—	—	✓	✓	✓
Anhui	Tongling	Prefecture-level city	4	—	—	—	✓	✓	✓
Guangdong	Zhuhai	Prefecture-level city	4	—	—	—	✗	✓	✓
Hunan	Zhuzhou	Prefecture-level city	4	—	—	—	✓	✓	✓
Anhui	Wuhu	Prefecture-level city	4	—	—	—	✓	✓	✓
Shaanxi	Baoji	Prefecture-level city	4	—	—	—	✓	✗	✓
Jiangsu	Wuxi	Prefecture-level city	4	—	—	—	✓	✗	✓
Guangdong	Foshan	Prefecture-level city	4	—	—	—	✓	✓	✓
Jiangsu	Taizhou	Prefecture-level city	4	—	—	—	✓	✓	✓
Fujian	Quanzhou	Prefecture-level city	4	—	—	—	✓	✓ (Resumed on August 19, 2021)	✓
Zhejiang	Wenzhou	Prefecture-level city	4	—	—	—	✓	✓	✓
Fujian	Zhangzhou	Prefecture-level city	4	—	—	—	✓	✓	✓
Shanghai	Fengxian	District	4	—	—	—	✓	✓	✓
Beijing	Haidian	District	4	—	—	—	✓	✓	✓
Chongqing	Nan'an	District	4	—	—	—	✓	✓	✓
Tianjin	Hexi	District	4	—	—	—	✓	✓	✓
Henan	Jiyuan	County-level city	4	—	—	—	✓	✓	✓
Xinjiang	Shihezi	County-level city	4	—	—	—	✓	✗	✓
Shandong	Jinan	Deputy provincial	5	—	—	—	—	✓	✓
Hainan	Haikou	Provincial capital	5	—	—	—	—	✓	✓
Hebei	Shijiazhuang	Provincial capital	5	—	—	—	—	✓ (Resumed on March 3, 2022)	✓
Xinjiang	Ürümqi	Regional capital	5	—	—	—	—	✗	✓
Qinghai	Xining	Provincial capital	5	—	—	—	—	✓	✓
Jiangsu	Suqian	Prefecture-level city	5	—	—	—	—	✓	✓
Shandong	Rizhao	Prefecture-level city	5	—	—	—	—	✓	✓
Anhui	Huaibei	Prefecture-level city	5	—	—	—	—	✓	✓
Zhejiang	Lishui	Prefecture-level city	5	—	—	—	—	✓	✓
Jiangsu	Xuzhou	Prefecture-level city	5	—	—	—	—	✓	✓
Liaoning	Panjin	Prefecture-level city	5	—	—	—	—	✓	✓
Zhejiang	Huzhou	Prefecture-level city	5	—	—	—	—	✓	✓
Sichuan	Suining	Prefecture-level city	5	—	—	—	—	✓	✓
Anhui	Bengbu	Prefecture-level city	5	—	—	—	—	✓	✓
Heilongjiang	Yichun	Prefecture-level city	5	—	—	—	—	✗	✓
Anhui	Xuancheng	Prefecture-level city	5	—	—	—	—	✓	✓
Hunan	Xiangtan	Prefecture-level city	5	—	—	—	—	✓	✓
Hebei	Qinhuangdao	Prefecture-level city	5	—	—	—	—	✓	✓
Inner Mongolia	Tongliao	Prefecture-level city	5	—	—	—	—	✓ (Resumed on October 9, 2021)	✓
Shandong	Laiwu (Note: Merged into Jinan on 9 January 2019, and a prefecture-level city was disestablished.)	Prefecture-level city	5	—	—	—	—	—	
Hebei	Handan	Prefecture-level city	5	—	—	—	—	✓ (Resumed on March 3, 2022)	✓
Shaanxi	Xianyang	Prefecture-level city	5	—	—	—	—	✓	✓
Ningxia	Shizuishan	Prefecture-level city	5	—	—	—	—	✓	✓
Liaoning	Anshan	Prefecture-level city	5	—	—	—	—	✓	✓
Sichuan	Luzhou	Prefecture-level city	5	—	—	—	—	✓	✓
Jiangxi	Ji'an	Prefecture-level city	5	—	—	—	—	✓	✓
Henan	Xinxiang	Prefecture-level city	5	—	—	—	—	✓	✓
Guizhou	Zunyi	Prefecture-level city	5	—	—	—	—	✓	✓
Anhui	Anqing	Prefecture-level city	5	—	—	—	—	✓	✓
Gansu	Jiayuguan	Prefecture-level city	5	—	—	—	—	✓	✓
Fujian	Putian	Prefecture-level city	5	—	—	—	—	✓	✓
Fujian	Longyan	Prefecture-level city	5	—	—	—	—	✓	✓
Zhejiang	Taizhou	Prefecture-level city	5	—	—	—	—	✓	✓
Henan	Zhumadian	Prefecture-level city	5	—	—	—	—	✓	✓
Jiangxi	Ganzhou	Prefecture-level city	5	—	—	—	—	✓	✓
Shanghai	Xuhui	District	5	—	—	—	—	✓	✓
Shanghai	Jiading	District	5	—	—	—	—	✓	✓
Chongqing	Jiangbei	District	5	—	—	—	—	✓	✓
Beijing	Tongzhou	District	5	—	—	—	—	✓	✓
Shandong	Jiaozhou	County-level city	5	—	—	—	—	✓	✓
Jiangsu	Danyang	County-level city	5	—	—	—	—	✓	✓
Zhejiang	Zhuji	County-level city	5	—	—	—	—	✓	✓
Zhejiang	Haining	County-level city	5	—	—	—	—	✗	✓
Shandong	Shouguang	County-level city	5	—	—	—	—	✓	✓
Zhejiang	Changxing	County	5	—	—	—	—	✓	✓
Jiangsu	Yixing	County-level city	5	—	—	—	—	✓	✓
Jiangsu	Jiangyin	County-level city	5	—	—	—	—	✓	✓
Henan	Gongyi	County-level city	5	—	—	—	—	✓	✓
Jiangsu	Changshu	County-level city	5	—	—	—	—	✓	✓
Anhui	Dangtu	County	5	—	—	—	—	✓	✓
Hunan	Shaoshan	County-level city	5	—	—	—	—	✓	✓
Shandong	Laizhou	County-level city	5	—	—	—	—	✓	✓
Hubei	Yidu	County-level city	5	—	—	—	—	✓	✓
Guangdong	Boluo	County	5	—	—	—	—	✓	✓
Shandong	Rongcheng	County-level city	5	—	—	—	—	✓	✓
Jiangsu	Liyang	County-level city	5	—	—	—	—	✓	✓
Shandong	Gongyi	County-level city	5	—	—	—	—	✓	✓
Inner Mongolia	Otog Front	Banner	5	—	—	—	—	✓	✓
Anhui	Tianchang	County-level city	5	—	—	—	—	✓	✓
Jiangsu	Rugao	County-level city	5	—	—	—	—	✓	✓
Jilin	Meihekou	County-level city	5	—	—	—	—	✓	✓
Henan	Yongcheng	County-level city	5	—	—	—	—	✓	✓
Henan	Xixia	County	5	—	—	—	—	✓	✓
Jiangxi	Nanchang	County	5	—	—	—	—	✓	✓
Hebei	Zhengding	County	5	—	—	—	—	✓	✓
Hainan	Qionghai	County-level city	5	—	—	—	—	✓	✓
Yunnan	Tengchong	County-level city	5	—	—	—	—	✓	✓
Zhejiang	Yuyao	County-level city	5	—	—	—	—	✓	✓
Shanxi	Xiaoyi	County-level city	5	—	—	—	—	✗	✓
Shaanxi	Feng	County	5	—	—	—	—	✓	✓
Hebei	Qian'an	County-level city	5	—	—	—	—	✓	✓
Henan	Changyuan	County-level city (Note: As a county before August 2019.)	5	—	—	—	—	✓	✓
Yunnan	Anning	County-level city	5	—	—	—	—	✓	✓
Shaanxi	Zhidan	County	5	—	—	—	—	✓	✓
Fujian	Shishi	County-level city	5	—	—	—	—	✓	✓
Jilin	Dunhua	County-level city	5	—	—	—	—	✓	✓
Anhui	Chaohu	County-level city	5	—	—	—	—	✗	✓
Zhejiang	Tonglu	County	5	—	—	—	—	✓	✓
Guangdong	Longmen	County	5	—	—	—	—	✓	✓
Fujian	Wuping	County	5	—	—	—	—	✓	✓
Hubei	Daye	County-level city	5	—	—	—	—	✓	✓
Zhejiang	Rui'an	County-level city	5	—	—	—	—	✓	✓
Shandong	Longkou	County-level city	5	—	—	—	—	✓	✓
Fujian	Jinjiang	County-level city	5	—	—	—	—	✗	✓
Guangdong	Sihui	County-level city	5	—	—	—	—	✓	✓
Chongqing	Zhong	County	5	—	—	—	—	✗	✓
Fujian	Shaxian	District (Note: As a county before January 2021.)	5	—	—	—	—	✓	—
Inner Mongolia	Jungar	Banner	5	—	—	—	—	✓	✗
Xinjiang	Changji	County-level city	5	—	—	—	—	✗	✓
Yunnan	Kunming	Provincial capital	6	—	—	—	—	—	✓
Gansu	Lanzhou	Provincial capital	6	—	—	—	—	—	✓
Shanghai	Minhang	District	6	—	—	—	—	—	✓
Tianjin	Xiqing	District	6	—	—	—	—	—	✓
Tianjin	Beichen	District	6	—	—	—	—	—	✓
Shanghai	Chongming	District	6	—	—	—	—	—	✓
Tianjin	Binhai	District	6	—	—	—	—	—	✓
Chongqing	Hechuan	District	6	—	—	—	—	—	✓
Shanghai	Songjiang	District	6	—	—	—	—	—	✓
Shanghai	Jinshan	District	6	—	—	—	—	—	✓
Shanghai	Qingpu	District	6	—	—	—	—	—	✓
Chongqing	Shapingba	District	6	—	—	—	—	—	✓
Chongqing	Fuling	District	6	—	—	—	—	—	✓
Beijing	Yanqing	District	6	—	—	—	—	—	✓
Hubei	Shiyan	Prefecture-level city	6	—	—	—	—	—	✓
Jiangsu	Yancheng	Prefecture-level city	6	—	—	—	—	—	✓
Zhejiang	Jinhua	Prefecture-level city	6	—	—	—	—	—	✓
Zhejiang	Quzhou	Prefecture-level city	6	—	—	—	—	—	✓
Shandong	Jining	Prefecture-level city	6	—	—	—	—	—	✓
Jiangsu	Huai'an	Prefecture-level city	6	—	—	—	—	—	✓
Shandong	Tai'an	Prefecture-level city	6	—	—	—	—	—	✓
Zhejiang	Zhoushan	Prefecture-level city	6	—	—	—	—	—	✓
Sichuan	Deyang	Prefecture-level city	6	—	—	—	—	—	✓
Guangdong	Zhaoqing	Prefecture-level city	6	—	—	—	—	—	✓
Jiangsu	Lianyungang	Prefecture-level city	6	—	—	—	—	—	✓
Anhui	Chuzhou	Prefecture-level city	6	—	—	—	—	—	✓
Henan	Jiaozuo	Prefecture-level city	6	—	—	—	—	—	✓
Jiangxi	Pingxiang	Prefecture-level city	6	—	—	—	—	—	✓
Yunnan	Pu'er City	Prefecture-level city	6	—	—	—	—	—	✓
Hubei	Ezhou	Prefecture-level city	6	—	—	—	—	—	✓
Henan	Luohe	Prefecture-level city	6	—	—	—	—	—	✓
Hebei	Langfang	Prefecture-level city	6	—	—	—	—	—	✓
Henan	Nanyang	Prefecture-level city	6	—	—	—	—	—	✓
Hubei	Jingmen	Prefecture-level city	6	—	—	—	—	—	✓
Jilin	Jilin	Prefecture-level city	6	—	—	—	—	—	✓
Guangxi	Guilin	Prefecture-level city	6	—	—	—	—	—	✓
Sichuan	Zigong	Prefecture-level city	6	—	—	—	—	—	✓
Sichuan	Meishan	Prefecture-level city	6	—	—	—	—	—	✓
Anhui	Huangshan	Prefecture-level city	6	—	—	—	—	—	✓
Hunan	Chenzhou	Prefecture-level city	6	—	—	—	—	—	✓
Shanxi	Jincheng	Prefecture-level city	6	—	—	—	—	—	✓
Yunnan	Qujing	Prefecture-level city	6	—	—	—	—	—	✓
Henan	Xinyang	Prefecture-level city	6	—	—	—	—	—	✓
Anhui	Suzhou	Prefecture-level city	6	—	—	—	—	—	✓
Shaanxi	Tongchuan	Prefecture-level city	6	—	—	—	—	—	✓
Sichuan	Yibin	Prefecture-level city	6	—	—	—	—	—	✓
Guizhou	Liupanshui	Prefecture-level city	6	—	—	—	—	—	✓
Henan	Shangqiu	Prefecture-level city	6	—	—	—	—	—	✓
Hunan	Loudi	Prefecture-level city	6	—	—	—	—	—	✓
Fujian	Ningde	Prefecture-level city	6	—	—	—	—	—	✓
Jiangxi	Jingdezhen	Prefecture-level city	6	—	—	—	—	—	✓
Shanxi	Xinzhou	Prefecture-level city	6	—	—	—	—	—	✓
Anhui	Fuyang	Prefecture-level city	6	—	—	—	—	—	✓
Zhejiang	Deqing	County	6	—	—	—	—	—	✓
Anhui	Jinzhai	County	6	—	—	—	—	—	✓
Jilin	Yanji	County-level city	6	—	—	—	—	—	✓
Shandong	Qufu	County-level city	6	—	—	—	—	—	✓
Henan	Linzhou	County-level city	6	—	—	—	—	—	✓
Jiangsu	Pizhou	County-level city	6	—	—	—	—	—	✓
Jiangsu	Qidong	County-level city	6	—	—	—	—	—	✓
Hebei	Dachang	County	6	—	—	—	—	—	✓
Zhejiang	Cixi	County-level city	6	—	—	—	—	—	✓
Jiangsu	Hai'an	County-level city	6	—	—	—	—	—	✓
Zhejiang	Jiashan	County	6	—	—	—	—	—	✓
Jiangsu	Kunshan	County-level city	6	—	—	—	—	—	✓
Anhui	Guangde	County-level city	6	—	—	—	—	—	✓
Zhejiang	Haiyan	County	6	—	—	—	—	—	✓
Zhejiang	Pinghu	County-level city	6	—	—	—	—	—	✓
Zhejiang	Anji	County	6	—	—	—	—	—	✓
Jiangxi	Yifeng	County	6	—	—	—	—	—	✓
Hubei	Zhijiang	County-level city	6	—	—	—	—	—	✓
Henan	Xin'an	County	6	—	—	—	—	—	✓
Anhui	Ningguo	County-level city	6	—	—	—	—	—	✓
Shandong	Xintai	County-level city	6	—	—	—	—	—	✓
Hunan	Ningxiang	County-level city	6	—	—	—	—	—	✓
Shanxi	Jingle	County	6	—	—	—	—	—	✓
Hubei	Zhushan	County	6	—	—	—	—	—	✓
Sichuan	Dujiangyan	County	6	—	—	—	—	—	✓
Anhui	She	County	6	—	—	—	—	—	✓
Sichuan	Miyi	County	6	—	—	—	—	—	✓
Jiangsu	Jurong	County-level city	6	—	—	—	—	—	✓
Zhejiang	Linhai	County-level city	6	—	—	—	—	—	✓
Zhejiang	Jiande	County-level city	6	—	—	—	—	—	✓
Shaanxi	Binzhou	County-level city	6	—	—	—	—	—	✓
Henan	Pingyu	County	6	—	—	—	—	—	✓
Guangdong	Deqing	County	6	—	—	—	—	—	✓
Fujian	Shanghang	County	6	—	—	—	—	—	✓
Guizhou	Kaili	County-level city	6	—	—	—	—	—	✓
Shanxi	Gu	County	6	—	—	—	—	—	✓
Jiangxi	Yushan	County	6	—	—	—	—	—	✓
Jiangsu	Taicang	County-level city	6	—	—	—	—	—	✓
Jiangsu	Rudong	County	6	—	—	—	—	—	✓
Sichuan	Langzhong	County-level city	6	—	—	—	—	—	✓
Zhejiang	Yiwu	County-level city	6	—	—	—	—	—	✓
Shaanxi	Wuqi	County	6	—	—	—	—	—	✓
Zhejiang	Shengzhou	County-level city	6	—	—	—	—	—	✓
Jilin	Tonghua	County	6	—	—	—	—	—	✓
Inner Mongolia	Hanggin	County	6	—	—	—	—	—	✓
Hebei	Wen'an	County	6	—	—	—	—	—	✓
Henan	Zhecheng	County	6	—	—	—	—	—	✓
Jiangsu	Jingjiang	County-level city	6	—	—	—	—	—	✓
Guizhou	Renhuai	County-level city	6	—	—	—	—	—	✓
Shandong	Feicheng	County-level city	6	—	—	—	—	—	✓
Shandong	Qingzhou	County-level city	6	—	—	—	—	—	✓
Hubei	Danjiangkou	County-level city	6	—	—	—	—	—	✓
Shandong	Changyi	County-level city	6	—	—	—	—	—	✓
Chongqing	Wuxi	County	6	—	—	—	—	—	✓
Yunnan	Jinghong	County-level city	6	—	—	—	—	—	✓
Heilongjiang	Huanan	County	6	—	—	—	—	—	✓
Fujian	Fuqing	County-level city	6	—	—	—	—	—	✓
Shanxi	Zhangzi	County	6	—	—	—	—	—	✓
Guangdong	Renhua	County	6	—	—	—	—	—	✓
Shanxi	Qinshui	County	6	—	—	—	—	—	✓
Henan	Ruzhou	County-level city	6	—	—	—	—	—	✓
Jilin	Ji'an	County-level city	6	—	—	—	—	—	✓
Yunnan	Shilin Yi	County	6	—	—	—	—	—	✓
Hebei	Zunhua	County-level city	6	—	—	—	—	—	✓
Shandong	Zhucheng	County-level city	6	—	—	—	—	—	✓
Sichuan	Jiangyou	County-level city	6	—	—	—	—	—	✓
Yunnan	Chuxiong	County-level city	6	—	—	—	—	—	✓
Henan	Lankao	County	6	—	—	—	—	—	✓
Jiangxi	Luxi	County	6	—	—	—	—	—	✓
Jiangxi	Dayu	County	6	—	—	—	—	—	✓
Jiangsu	Gaoyou	County-level city	6	—	—	—	—	—	✓
Hunan	Xiangtan	County	6	—	—	—	—	—	✓
Guangxi	Beiliu	County-level city	6	—	—	—	—	—	✓
Qinghai	Yushu	County-level city	6	—	—	—	—	—	✓
Yunnan	Chengjiang	County-level city	6	—	—	—	—	—	✓
Fujian	Dehua	County	6	—	—	—	—	—	✓
Xinjiang	Bole	County-level city	6	—	—	—	—	—	✓
Anhui	Tongcheng	County-level city	6	—	—	—	—	—	✓
Henan	Xin	County	6	—	—	—	—	—	✓
Inner Mongolia	Hohhot	Regional capital	7	—	—	—	—	—	—
Beijing	Shijingshan	District	7	—	—	—	—	—	—
Beijing	Mentougou	District	7	—	—	—	—	—	—
Beijing	Shunyi	District	7	—	—	—	—	—	—
Beijing	Huairou	District	7	—	—	—	—	—	—
Beijing	Miyun	District	7	—	—	—	—	—	—
Tianjin	Hedong	District	7	—	—	—	—	—	—
Tianjin	Nankai	District	7	—	—	—	—	—	—
Tianjin	Dongli	District	7	—	—	—	—	—	—
Tianjin	Baodi	District	7	—	—	—	—	—	—
Shanghai	Huangpu	District	7	—	—	—	—	—	—
Shanghai	Putuo	District	7	—	—	—	—	—	—
Shanghai	Hongkou	District	7	—	—	—	—	—	—
Shanghai	Baoshan	District	7	—	—	—	—	—	—
Chongqing	Jiangjin	District	7	—	—	—	—	—	—
Hebei	Chengde	Prefecture-level city	7	—	—	—	—	—	—
Inner Mongolia	Hulunbuir	Prefecture-level city	7	—	—	—	—	—	—
Inner Mongolia	Ulanqab	Prefecture-level city	7	—	—	—	—	—	—
Liaoning	Yingkou	Prefecture-level city	7	—	—	—	—	—	—
Liaoning	Liaoyang	Prefecture-level city	7	—	—	—	—	—	—
Anhui	Huai'nan	Prefecture-level city	7	—	—	—	—	—	—
Anhui	Huai'nan	Prefecture-level city	7	—	—	—	—	—	—
Anhui	Lu'an	Prefecture-level city	7	—	—	—	—	—	—
Anhui	Bozhou	Prefecture-level city	7	—	—	—	—	—	—
Anhui	Chizhou	Prefecture-level city	7	—	—	—	—	—	—
Jiangxi	Jiujiang	Prefecture-level city	7	—	—	—	—	—	—
Jiangxi	Shangrao	Prefecture-level city	7	—	—	—	—	—	—
Shandong	Dezhou	Prefecture-level city	7	—	—	—	—	—	—
Shandong	Liaocheng	Prefecture-level city	7	—	—	—	—	—	—
Shandong	Binzhou	Prefecture-level city	7	—	—	—	—	—	—
Shandong	Heze	Prefecture-level city	7	—	—	—	—	—	—
Henan	Pingdingshan	Prefecture-level city	7	—	—	—	—	—	—
Henan	Anyang	Prefecture-level city	7	—	—	—	—	—	—
Henan	Hebi	Prefecture-level city	7	—	—	—	—	—	—
Henan	Zhoukou	Prefecture-level city	7	—	—	—	—	—	—
Hubei	Huangshi	Prefecture-level city	7	—	—	—	—	—	—
Hubei	Xiangyang	Prefecture-level city	7	—	—	—	—	—	—
Hubei	Jingzhou	Prefecture-level city	7	—	—	—	—	—	—
Hubei	Xianning	Prefecture-level city	7	—	—	—	—	—	—
Hunan	Hengyang	Prefecture-level city	7	—	—	—	—	—	—
Hunan	Shaoyang	Prefecture-level city	7	—	—	—	—	—	—
Hunan	Yiyang	Prefecture-level city	7	—	—	—	—	—	—
Guangdong	Shaoguan	Prefecture-level city	7	—	—	—	—	—	—
Guangdong	Shantou	Prefecture-level city	7	—	—	—	—	—	—
Guangdong	Heyuan	Prefecture-level city	7	—	—	—	—	—	—
Guangdong	Qingyuan	Prefecture-level city	7	—	—	—	—	—	—
Guangxi	Liuzhou	Prefecture-level city	7	—	—	—	—	—	—
Guangxi	Beihai	Prefecture-level city	7	—	—	—	—	—	—
Sichuan	Panzhihua	Prefecture-level city	7	—	—	—	—	—	—
Sichuan	Ya'an	Prefecture-level city	7	—	—	—	—	—	—
Sichuan	Bazhong	Prefecture-level city	7	—	—	—	—	—	—
Sichuan	Ziyang	Prefecture-level city	7	—	—	—	—	—	—
Yunnan	Baoshan	Prefecture-level city	7	—	—	—	—	—	—
Yunnan	Lijiang	Prefecture-level city	7	—	—	—	—	—	—
Shaanxi	Weinan	Prefecture-level city	7	—	—	—	—	—	—
Shaanxi	Yulin	Prefecture-level city	7	—	—	—	—	—	—
Ningxia	Wuzhong	Prefecture-level city	7	—	—	—	—	—	—
Hebei	Pingshan	County	7	—	—	—	—	—	—
Hebei	Luannan	County	7	—	—	—	—	—	—
Hebei	Linzhang	County	7	—	—	—	—	—	—
Hebei	Huailai	County	7	—	—	—	—	—	—
Hebei	Gu'an	County	7	—	—	—	—	—	—
Hebei	Xinji	County-level city	7	—	—	—	—	—	—
Hebei	Xinle	County-level city	7	—	—	—	—	—	—
Hebei	Wu'an	County-level city	7	—	—	—	—	—	—
Hebei	Dingzhou	County-level city	7	—	—	—	—	—	—
Shanxi	Kelan	County	7	—	—	—	—	—	—
Shanxi	Hongdong	County	7	—	—	—	—	—	—
Inner Mongolia	Tumed Right	Banner	7	—	—	—	—	—	—
Inner Mongolia	Otog	Banner	7	—	—	—	—	—	—
Inner Mongolia	Uxin	Banner	7	—	—	—	—	—	—
Inner Mongolia	Urad Middle	Banner	7	—	—	—	—	—	—
Liaoning	Haicheng	County-level city	7	—	—	—	—	—	—
Liaoning	Beipiao	County-level city	7	—	—	—	—	—	—
Liaoning	Jianping	County	7	—	—	—	—	—	—
Jilin	Huinan	County	7	—	—	—	—	—	—
Jilin	Changbai	County	7	—	—	—	—	—	—
Jilin	Qian Gorlos	County	7	—	—	—	—	—	—
Heilongjiang	Tieli	County-level city	7	—	—	—	—	—	—
Heilongjiang	Fuyuan	County-level city	7	—	—	—	—	—	—
Jiangsu	Xinyi	County-level city	7	—	—	—	—	—	—
Jiangsu	Yizheng	County-level city	7	—	—	—	—	—	—
Jiangsu	Yangzhong	County-level city	7	—	—	—	—	—	—
Jiangsu	Xinghua	County-level city	7	—	—	—	—	—	—
Jiangsu	Taixing	County-level city	7	—	—	—	—	—	—
Jiangsu	Donghai	County	7	—	—	—	—	—	—
Jiangsu	Jinhu	County	7	—	—	—	—	—	—
Jiangsu	Sheyang	County	7	—	—	—	—	—	—
Zhejiang	Tongxiang	County-level city	7	—	—	—	—	—	—
Zhejiang	Dongyang	County-level city	7	—	—	—	—	—	—
Zhejiang	Jiangshan	County-level city	7	—	—	—	—	—	—
Zhejiang	Wenling	County-level city	7	—	—	—	—	—	—
Zhejiang	Kaihua County	County	7	—	—	—	—	—	—
Zhejiang	Daishan County	County	7	—	—	—	—	—	—
Zhejiang	Shengsi County	County	7	—	—	—	—	—	—
Anhui	Qianshan	County-level city	7	—	—	—	—	—	—
Anhui	Mingguang	County-level city	7	—	—	—	—	—	—
Anhui	Feidong	County	7	—	—	—	—	—	—
Anhui	Feixi	County	7	—	—	—	—	—	—
Anhui	Nanling	County	7	—	—	—	—	—	—
Anhui	Xiuning	County	7	—	—	—	—	—	—
Anhui	Yingshang	County	7	—	—	—	—	—	—
Anhui	Huoshan	County	7	—	—	—	—	—	—
Anhui	Langxi	County	7	—	—	—	—	—	—
Fujian	Minhou	County	7	—	—	—	—	—	—
Fujian	Taining	County	7	—	—	—	—	—	—
Fujian	Huian	County	7	—	—	—	—	—	—
Fujian	Yongchun	County	7	—	—	—	—	—	—
Fujian	Yunxiao	County	7	—	—	—	—	—	—
Fujian	Dongshan	County	7	—	—	—	—	—	—
Fujian	Wuyishan	County-level city	7	—	—	—	—	—	—
Jiangxi	Leping	County-level city	7	—	—	—	—	—	—
Jiangxi	Jinggangshan	County-level city	7	—	—	—	—	—	—
Jiangxi	Fengcheng	County-level city	7	—	—	—	—	—	—
Jiangxi	Shangli	County	7	—	—	—	—	—	—
Jiangxi	Wuning	County	7	—	—	—	—	—	—
Jiangxi	Xingan	County	7	—	—	—	—	—	—
Jiangxi	Wuyuan	County	7	—	—	—	—	—	—
Shandong	Pingyin	County	7	—	—	—	—	—	—
Shandong	Guangrao	County	7	—	—	—	—	—	—
Shandong	Jinxiang	County	7	—	—	—	—	—	—
Shandong	Qihe	County	7	—	—	—	—	—	—
Shandong	Laixi	County-level city	7	—	—	—	—	—	—
Shandong	Tengzhou	County-level city	7	—	—	—	—	—	—
Shandong	Zoucheng	County-level city	7	—	—	—	—	—	—
Shandong	Linqing	County-level city	7	—	—	—	—	—	—
Shandong	Zouping	County-level city	7	—	—	—	—	—	—
Henan	Xingyang	County-level city	7	—	—	—	—	—	—
Henan	Xinzheng	County-level city	7	—	—	—	—	—	—
Henan	Dengfeng	County-level city	7	—	—	—	—	—	—
Henan	Yuzhou	County-level city	7	—	—	—	—	—	—
Henan	Luoning	County	7	—	—	—	—	—	—
Henan	Baofeng	County	7	—	—	—	—	—	—
Henan	Hua	County	7	—	—	—	—	—	—
Henan	Fangcheng	County	7	—	—	—	—	—	—
Henan	Minquan	County	7	—	—	—	—	—	—
Henan	Sui	County	7	—	—	—	—	—	—
Henan	Xiping	County	7	—	—	—	—	—	—
Henan	Biyang	County	7	—	—	—	—	—	—
Hubei	Zhuxi	County	7	—	—	—	—	—	—
Hubei	Yuan'an	County	7	—	—	—	—	—	—
Hubei	Dangyang	County-level city	7	—	—	—	—	—	—
Hubei	Laohekou	County-level city	7	—	—	—	—	—	—
Hubei	Zhongxiang	County-level city	7	—	—	—	—	—	—
Hubei	Xiantao	County-level city	7	—	—	—	—	—	—
Hubei	Tianmen	County-level city	7	—	—	—	—	—	—
Hunan	Pingjiang	County	7	—	—	—	—	—	—
Hunan	Dao	County	7	—	—	—	—	—	—
Hunan	Guiyang	County	7	—	—	—	—	—	—
Hunan	Ningyuan	County	7	—	—	—	—	—	—
Hunan	Xintian	County	7	—	—	—	—	—	—
Hunan	Jianghua	County	7	—	—	—	—	—	—
Hunan	Miluo	County-level city	7	—	—	—	—	—	—
Guangdong	Ruyuan	County	7	—	—	—	—	—	—
Guangdong	Fogang	County	7	—	—	—	—	—	—
Guangdong	Heshan	County-level city	7	—	—	—	—	—	—
Guangdong	Lianjiang	County-level city	7	—	—	—	—	—	—
Guangdong	Yingde	County-level city	7	—	—	—	—	—	—
Guangxi	Bama	County	7	—	—	—	—	—	—
Guangxi	Mengshan	County	7	—	—	—	—	—	—
Guangxi	Fusui	County	7	—	—	—	—	—	—
Guangxi	Pingguo	County-level city	7	—	—	—	—	—	—
Hainan	Wenchang	County-level city	7	—	—	—	—	—	—
Sichuan	Jianyang	County-level city	7	—	—	—	—	—	—
Sichuan	Longchang	County-level city	7	—	—	—	—	—	—
Sichuan	Emeishan	County-level city	7	—	—	—	—	—	—
Sichuan	Xichang	County-level city	7	—	—	—	—	—	—
Sichuan	Beichuan	County	7	—	—	—	—	—	—
Sichuan	Jiang'an	County	7	—	—	—	—	—	—
Sichuan	Dazhu	County	7	—	—	—	—	—	—
Sichuan	Hanyuan	County	7	—	—	—	—	—	—
Sichuan	Lezhi	County	7	—	—	—	—	—	—
Guizhou	Yuping	County	7	—	—	—	—	—	—
Guizhou	Zhenyuan	County	7	—	—	—	—	—	—
Guizhou	Longli	County	7	—	—	—	—	—	—
Guizhou	Panzhou	County-level city	7	—	—	—	—	—	—
Guizhou	Chishui	County-level city	7	—	—	—	—	—	—
Yunnan	Luoping	County	7	—	—	—	—	—	—
Yunnan	Dayao	County	7	—	—	—	—	—	—
Yunnan	Kaiyuan	County-level city	7	—	—	—	—	—	—
Yunnan	Mengzi	County-level city	7	—	—	—	—	—	—
Yunnan	Wenshan	County-level city	7	—	—	—	—	—	—
Tibet	Qüxü	County	7	—	—	—	—	—	—
Shaanxi	Linyou	County	7	—	—	—	—	—	—
Shaanxi	Fugu	County	7	—	—	—	—	—	—
Gansu	Sunan	County	7	—	—	—	—	—	—
Gansu	Chongxin	County	7	—	—	—	—	—	—
Gansu	Yongjing	County	7	—	—	—	—	—	—
Gansu	Yumen	County-level city	7	—	—	—	—	—	—
Gansu	Dunhuang	County-level city	7	—	—	—	—	—	—
Qinghai	Golmud	County-level city	7	—	—	—	—	—	—
Xinjiang	Shanshan County	County	7	—	—	—	—	—	—
