= Jiangtian =

Town in Changle District, Fuzhou City, Fujian Province, China

Coordinates: 25°49′16″N 119°34′36″E

Jiangtian (Chinese: 江田) is a town with the longest coastline in Changle district. Jiangtian Town is ranked as a leading economic town in Fuzhou city with its strong development momentum. In recent years, it is becoming one of the major gathering places for industrial development and investment in Fuzhou city, Fujian province. Clothing industry, and steel industry are the major industries in Jiangtian Town. The tourism in Jiangtian Town is another developing industry.

== Tourism ==
=== Nanyang Village- red tourism spot (the former site of Fujian Provincial Party Committee) ===
The Fujian Provincial Committee of the Chinese Communist Party moved to Nanyang Village, Changle. During the Second Sino-Japanese War, the committee launched a series of anti-Japanese activities and actively promoted the development of the province's revolutionary struggle. It has written a brilliant page in the history of Fujian's revolution. The Nanyang site of the Fujian Provincial Committee of the Chinese Communist Party has been turned into a national defense education base in Fujian Province, a patriotic education base in Fuzhou City, a patriotism education and moral education base in Changle, where has become an important place for cadres, masses, and adolescents to receive education in patriotism and revolutionary traditions.

=== Sanxi scenic area ===
Sanxi stream, also known as Dingxi stream, originates from the mountains at the junction of Changle and Fuqing and is known as the Changle No. 1 Stream. There are many bridges above Sanxi stream. Pingqiao bridge, Daqiao bridge, Xiaoqiao bridge, Xiashi bridge, and Dangqiao bridge, the five ancient stone bridges, which crossed the stream like a rainbow, were built in the Tang and Song Dynasties. The stream is crystal clear and the fish are clearly countable. The dwelling houses are lined with shores, which typical rivers and houses scenery in southern China. there are many stone tablet form historical celebrities, which was about praise for beautiful this area, in Sanxi scenic area

=== Jiulongshan eco-tourism scenic spot ===
Jiulongshan eco-tourism scenic spot is surrounded by mountains and rivers. The scenic spots are pleasing to the eye. It is a state-level AAA-level scenic spot and has won the four-star business unit of rural tourism in Fujian Province. The scenic spot is located in Jiangtian Town, Changle. It is just 50 minutes drive from Fuzhou city. Scenic spots face the sea, beside the red tourism spot on the site of the Nanyang Provincial Party Committee, which has a unique geographical advantage. The ecotourism area covers an area of about 2,000 mu and is divided into two areas under the mountain and on the mountain. Nine Dragons Villa activity contains swimming, boating, fishing, barbecue, horse archery, rafting, mountain climbing and 30 acres of ornamental fish breeding bases, which is a good place for tourism and leisure. The waterflow of Jiulong Stream area is continuously flowing all the year round.

== See also ==
- List of township-level divisions of Fujian
