= Yushan Lu station =

Suzhou Metro station

Coordinates: 31°17′08″N 120°32′43″E

Yushan Lu 玉山路
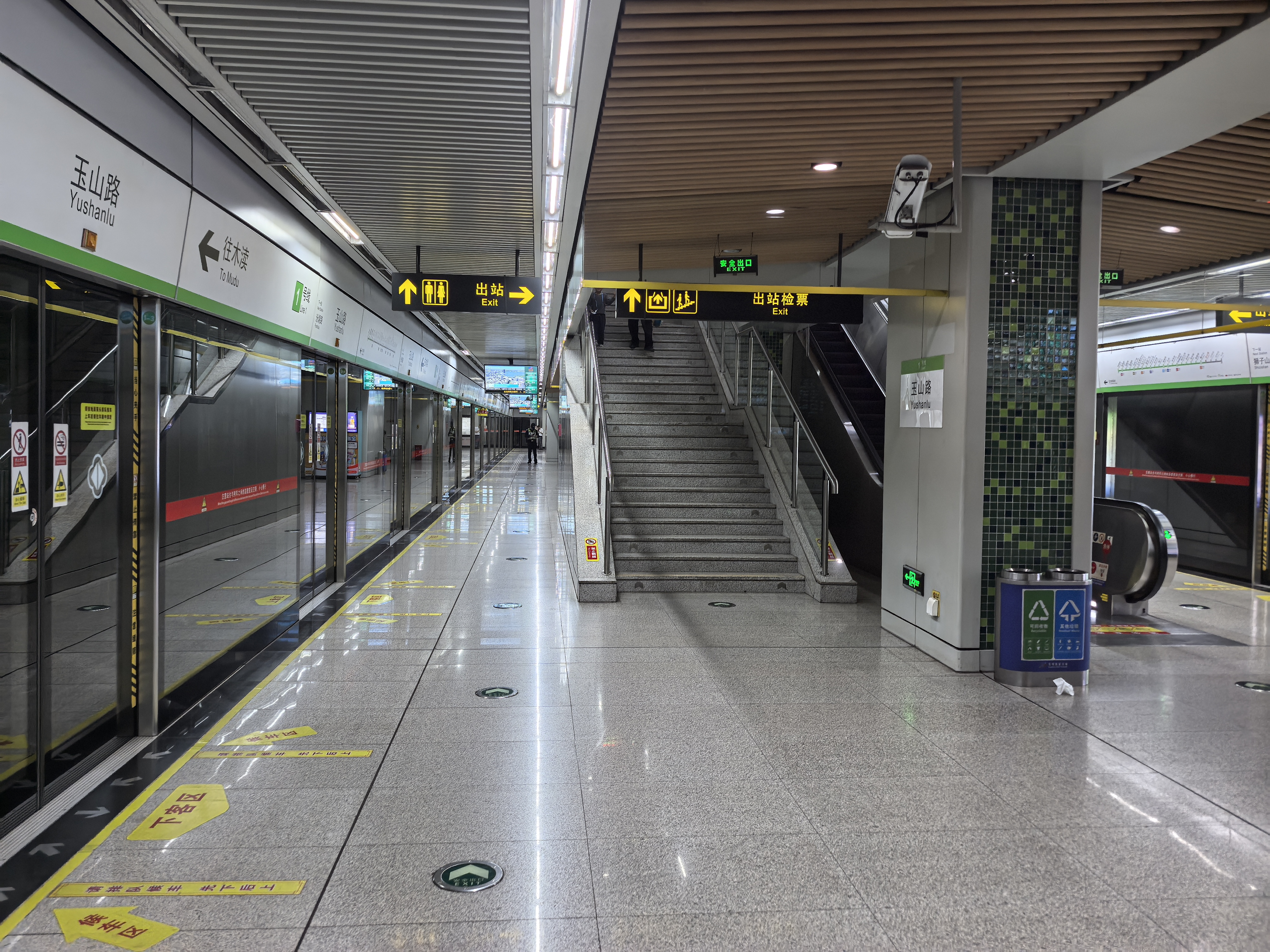

General information
- Other names: Yushan Road
- Location: Suzhou New District, Suzhou, Jiangsu; China
- Operated by: Suzhou Rail Transit Co., Ltd
- Line: Line 1
- Platforms: 2 (1 island platform)

Construction
- Structure type: Underground

History
- Opened: April 28, 2012

Services
Preceding station	Suzhou Metro	Following station
Fenhu Lu towards Mudu	Line 1	Shizishan towards Zhongnanjie
Location

Yushan Lu Station (Chinese: 玉山路站) is a station of Line 1 of the Suzhou Metro. The station is located in Suzhou New District of Suzhou. It has been in use since April 28, 2012, when Line 1 first opened.

== Station ==
=== Accessible Information ===
- Yushan Lu Station is a fully accessible station, this station equipped with wheelchair accessible elevators, blind paths with bumps, and wheelchair ramps. These facilities can help people with disabilities, seniors, youths, and pregnancies travel through the Suzhou Metro system.

=== Station configurations ===
L1 (First Floor/Street Level): Entrances/Exits (stairs and escalators); and elevators with wheelchair accessible ramps.

B1 (Mezzanine/Station Hall Level): Station Control Room; Customer Service; Automatic Ticket Vending Machines; Automatic Fee Collection Systems with turnstiles; stairs and escalators; and elevators with wheelchair accessible ramps.

B2 (Platform Level): Platform; toilet; stairs and escalators; elevators with wheelchair accessible ramps.

=== Station layout ===
L1	Street Level	Entrances/Exits
B1	Mezzanine	Station Control, Customer Service, Fare-gates, Ticketing Machines
B2; Platform level	To Zhongnan Jie	← Line 1 towards Zhongnan Jie Next Station: Shizishan
B2; Platform level	Island platform, doors will open on the left
B2; Platform level	To Mudu	→Line 1 towards Mudu Next Station: Fenhu Lu

== First & Last Trains ==
Directions	First Train	Last Train
Daily
Line 1
Towards Zhongnan Jie Station	06:16	22:06
Towards Mudu Station	06:50	23:16

== Exits Information ==
- Exit 1: West side of Changjiang Lu, inside of Matro Department Store SND Mall
- Exit 2: West side of Changjiang Lu
- Exit 3b: East side of Changjiang Lu
- Exit 3b: West side of Changjiang Lu
- Exit 4: West side of Changjiang Lu, inside of Izumiya Department Store & Supermarket

== Local attractions ==
- Yushan Park
- Matro Department Store SND mall
- Izumiya Department Store & Supermarket
- Suzhou Amusement Land Water World
- Suzhou Amusement Land Candy World
- JinYi Cinema
- XinTai Garden

== Bus Connections ==
- Bus Stop: YuShan GongYuan - Connection Bus Routes: Tour 3, 38, 39, 89, 317, 511
- Bus Stop: XinTaiHuaYuan XiChuKou - Connection Bus Routes: 2, 33, 67, 302, 312, 329
