= Jingyan County =

Jingyan County 井研县
- County
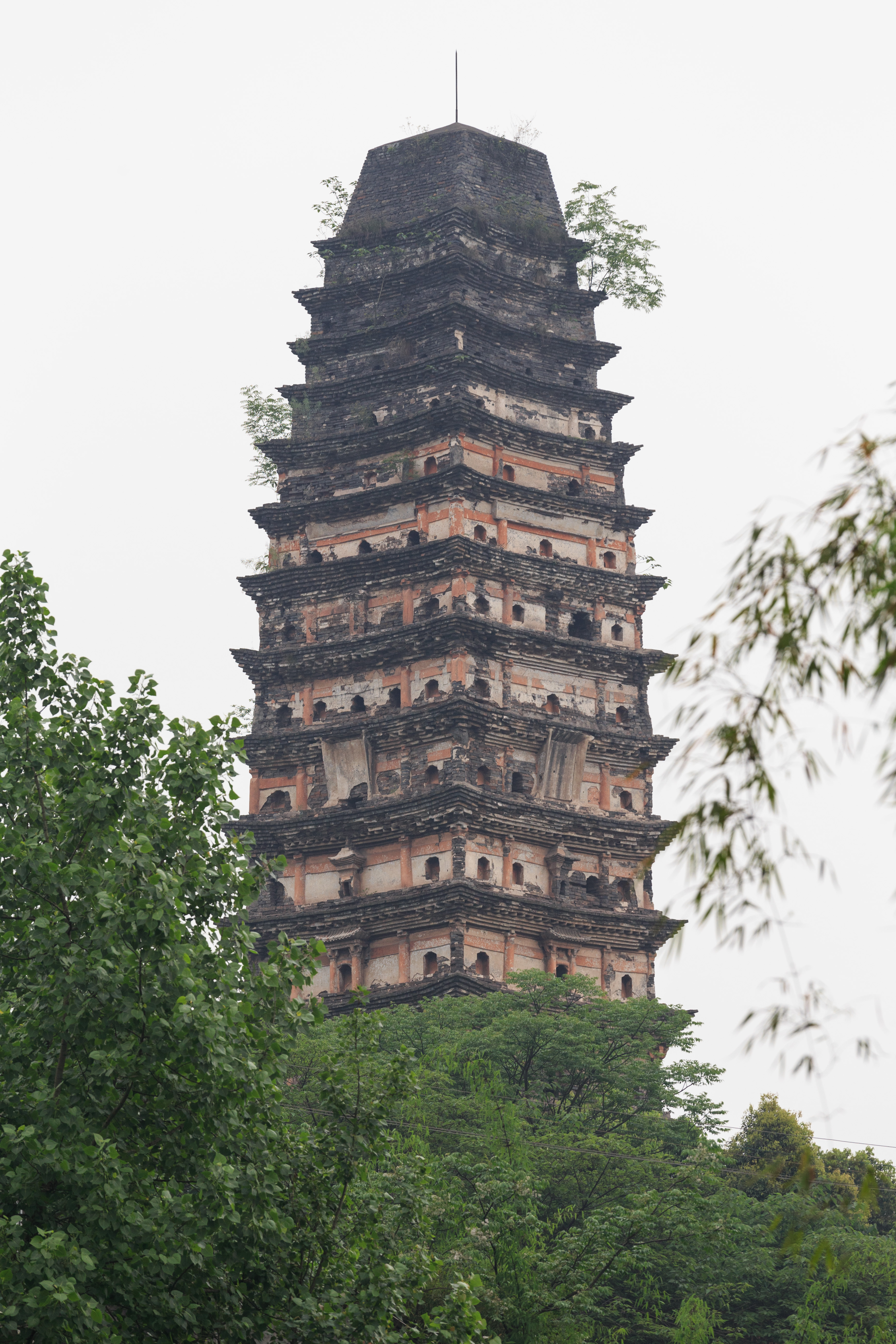

- Location of the seat in Sichuan
- Coordinates: 29°39′13″N 104°04′15″E
- Country: China
- Province: Sichuan
- Prefecture-level city: Leshan

Area
  - Total: 841 km^{2} (325 sq mi)

Population (2020 census)
  - Total: 280,641
  - Density: 334/km^{2} (864/sq mi)
- Time zone: UTC+8 (China Standard)

Jingyan (Chinese: 井研; pinyin: Jǐngyán) is a county of Sichuan Province, China. It is under the administration of Leshan city.

== Administrative divisions ==
Jingyan County comprises 1 subdistrict and 14 towns:

subdistrict

- Yancheng 研城街道

towns

- Mata 马踏镇
- Zhuyuan 竹园镇
- Yanjing 研经镇
- Zhoupo 周坡镇
- Qianfo 千佛镇
- Wangcun 王村镇
- Sanjiang 三江镇
- Donglin 东林镇
- Jiyi 集益镇
- Chunfu 纯复镇
- Baowu 宝五镇
- Zhenyang 镇阳镇
- Gaofeng 高凤镇
- Menkan 门坎镇

== Climate ==
Climate data for Jingyan, elevation 404 m (1,325 ft), (1991–2020 normals, extremes 1981–present)
Month	Jan	Feb	Mar	Apr	May	Jun	Jul	Aug	Sep	Oct	Nov	Dec	Year
Record high °C (°F)	20.0 (68.0)	24.6 (76.3)	32.5 (90.5)	34.5 (94.1)	36.7 (98.1)	36.4 (97.5)	41.0 (105.8)	41.6 (106.9)	36.6 (97.9)	30.2 (86.4)	25.6 (78.1)	19.2 (66.6)	41.6 (106.9)
Mean daily maximum °C (°F)	10.2 (50.4)	13.3 (55.9)	18.4 (65.1)	24.0 (75.2)	27.5 (81.5)	29.2 (84.6)	31.3 (88.3)	31.1 (88.0)	26.5 (79.7)	21.4 (70.5)	17.1 (62.8)	11.5 (52.7)	21.8 (71.2)
Daily mean °C (°F)	6.9 (44.4)	9.5 (49.1)	13.7 (56.7)	18.7 (65.7)	22.2 (72.0)	24.5 (76.1)	26.5 (79.7)	26.1 (79.0)	22.4 (72.3)	17.9 (64.2)	13.6 (56.5)	8.4 (47.1)	17.5 (63.6)
Mean daily minimum °C (°F)	4.6 (40.3)	6.8 (44.2)	10.4 (50.7)	14.9 (58.8)	18.3 (64.9)	21.1 (70.0)	23.1 (73.6)	22.8 (73.0)	19.9 (67.8)	15.8 (60.4)	11.2 (52.2)	6.2 (43.2)	14.6 (58.3)
Record low °C (°F)	−3.7 (25.3)	−1.2 (29.8)	−0.7 (30.7)	5.7 (42.3)	9.1 (48.4)	13.7 (56.7)	16.7 (62.1)	16.5 (61.7)	13.4 (56.1)	4.7 (40.5)	0.8 (33.4)	−2.4 (27.7)	−3.7 (25.3)
Average precipitation mm (inches)	9.8 (0.39)	13.6 (0.54)	31.6 (1.24)	68.0 (2.68)	90.9 (3.58)	138.0 (5.43)	171.5 (6.75)	207.2 (8.16)	110.0 (4.33)	43.8 (1.72)	19.6 (0.77)	8.4 (0.33)	912.4 (35.92)
Average precipitation days (≥ 0.1 mm)	8.5	8.1	11.1	13.2	14.2	16.0	15.0	14.4	15.6	14.8	8.8	8.0	147.7
Average snowy days	0.4	0.2	0	0	0	0	0	0	0	0	0	0.2	0.8
Average relative humidity (%)	82	79	75	74	74	80	83	83	85	86	84	83	81
Mean monthly sunshine hours	41.1	47.8	87.5	118.6	119.5	102.7	132.8	139.7	73.7	47.8	50.0	38.8	1,000
Percentage possible sunshine	13	15	23	31	28	25	31	35	20	14	16	12	22
Source: China Meteorological Administration all-time extreme temperature all-time January highall-time July high
