= Jinfeng, Fujian =

Jinfeng 金峰镇
- Town
- Location in Fujian
- Coordinates: 25.9784°N 119.6248°E
- Country: People's Republic of China
- Province: Fujian
- Prefecture-level city: Fuzhou
- District: Changle District
- Time zone: UTC+8 (China Standard)

Jinfeng (Chinese: 金峰; pinyin: Jīnfēng) is a town under the administration of Changle District, Fuzhou, Fujian, China. As of 2018, it has 2 residential communities and 19 villages under its administration.
