= Jinfeng Lu station =

Suzhou Metro station

Coordinates: 31°16′42″N 120°31′31″E

Jinfeng Lu 金枫路
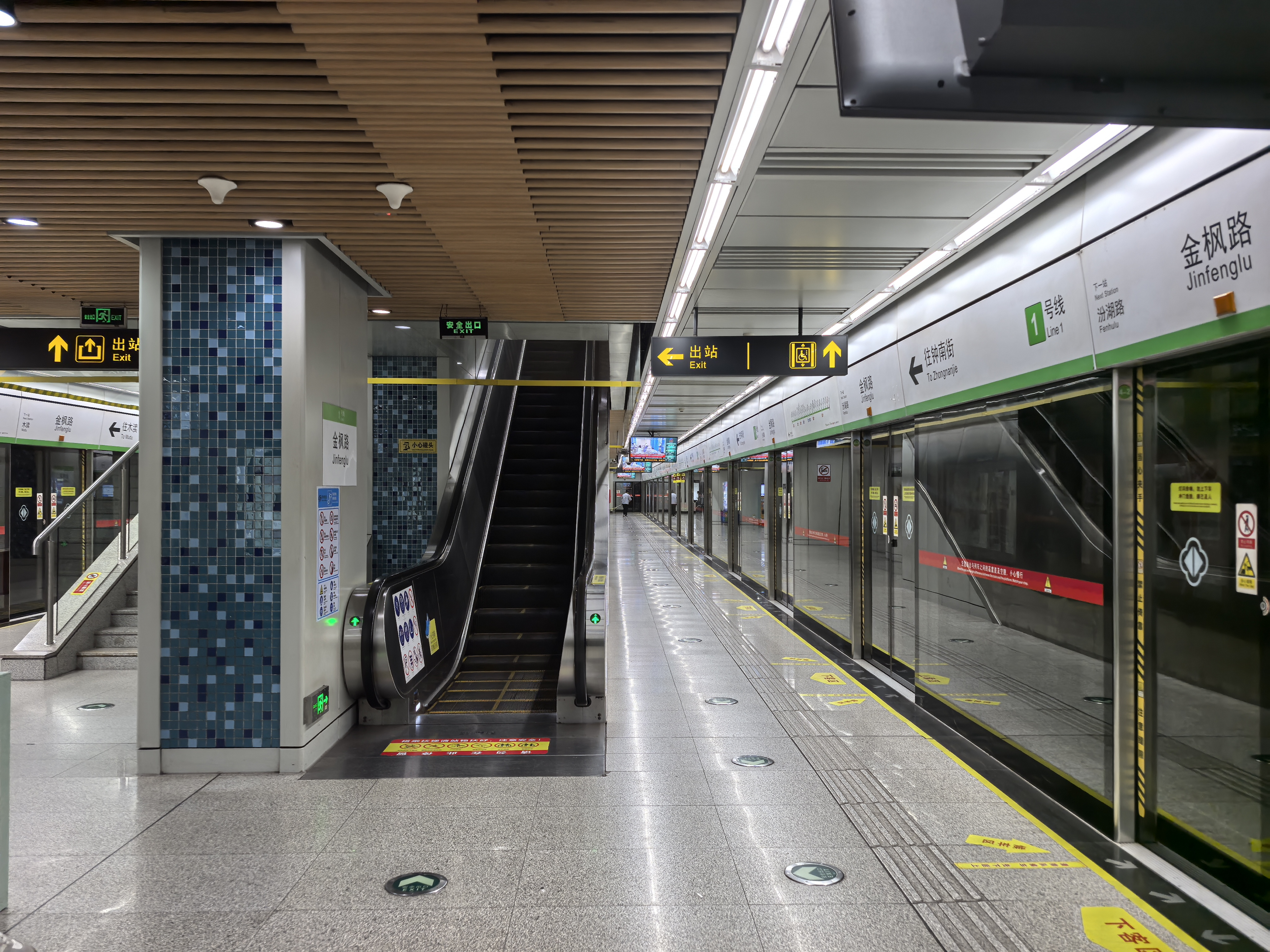

General information
- Other names: Jinfeng Road
- Location: Suzhou New District, Suzhou, Jiangsu; China
- Operated by: Suzhou Rail Transit Co., Ltd
- Line: Line 1
- Platforms: 2 (1 island platform)

Construction
- Structure type: Underground

History
- Opened: April 28, 2012

Services
Preceding station	Suzhou Metro	Following station
Mudu Terminus	Line 1	Fenhu Lu towards Zhongnanjie
Location

Jinfeng Lu Station (Chinese: 金枫路站) is a station of Line 1 of the Suzhou Metro. The station is located in Suzhou New District of Suzhou. It has been in use since April 28, 2012, when Line 1 first opened.

== Station ==
=== Accessible Information ===
- Jinfeng Lu Station is a fully accessible station, this station equipped with wheelchair accessible elevators, blind paths with bumps, and wheelchair ramps. These facilities can help people with disabilities, seniors, youths, and pregnancies travel through the Suzhou Metro system.

=== Station configurations ===
L1 (First Floor/Street Level): Entrances/Exits (stairs and escalators); and elevators with wheelchair accessible ramps.

B1 (Mezzanine/Station Hall Level): Station Control Room; Customer Service; Automatic Ticket Vending Machines; Automatic Fee Collection Systems with turnstiles; stairs and escalators; and elevators with wheelchair accessible ramps.

B2 (Platform Level): Platform; toilet; stairs and escalators; elevators with wheelchair accessible ramps.

=== Station layout ===
L1	Street Level	Entrances/Exits
B1	Mezzanine	Station Control, Customer Service, Fare-gates, Ticketing Machines
B2; Platform level	To Zhongnan Jie	← Line 1 towards Zhongnan Jie Next Station: Fenhu Lu
B2; Platform level	Island platform, doors will open on the left
B2; Platform level	To Mudu	→Line 1 towards Mudu Next Station: Mudu

== First & Last Trains ==
Directions	First Train	Last Train
Daily
Line 1
Towards Zhongnan Jie Station	06:11	22:01
Towards Mudu Station	06:55	23:20

== Exits Information ==
- Exit 1: South-West Corner of Jinfeng Lu and Zhuyuan Lu
- Exit 2: South-East Corner of Jinfeng Lu and Zhuyuan Lu
- Exit 3: North-East Corner of Jinfeng Lu and Zhuyuan Lu
- Exit 4: North-West Corner of Jinfeng Lu and Zhuyuan Lu

== Local attractions ==
- WanFeng Garden
- JinFeng International Garden
- SND Water Supply Plant

== Bus Connections ==
- Bus Stop: MuDu XinQu - Connection Bus Routes: 30, 35, 69, 69 Lessened Line, 326, 400, 661
- Bus Stop: XinQu ShuiChang - Connection Bus Routes: 2, 4, 30, 35, 38, 64, 400, 622, 662
- Bus Stop: JinFengLu ZhuYuanLu Nan - Connection Bus Routes: 665
- Bus Stop: JunHao JingMi - Connection Bus Routes: 2, 4, 38, 622
