= Yutian, Fujian =

Yutian 玉田镇
- Location within Fujian Location within China
- Coordinates: 25°52′29″N 119°27′28″E
- Country: China
- Province: Fujian
- Prefecture-level city: Fuzhou
- District: Changle District

Area
  - Total: 54.7 km^{2} (21.1 sq mi)

Population (2018)
  - Total: 43,358
- Time zone: UTC+8 (China Standard Time)
- Zip Code: 350203
- Area code: +86
- Vehicle registration: 闽A

Yutian (Chinese: 玉田; Pinyin: yùtián) is a town under the administration of Changle District, Fuzhou, Fujian, China. As of 2018, the town has a population of 43,358 within an area of 54.7 square kilometers.

== Climate ==
The climate is warm and temperate in Yutian. In Yutian, precipitation is notable throughout the entirety of the year, with even its most arid month still experiencing a considerable amount of rainfall. The Köppen-Geiger climate classification is Cfa. The mean yearly temperature observed in Yutian is recorded to be 19.3 °C (66.8 °F). The precipitation level on a yearly basis amounts to 1549 mm (61.0 inches) as per the meteorological records.

== Administrative Divisions ==
There are 11 villages under the town, they are listed as follows:

- Yutian
- Taoyuan
- Xipu
- Xishe
- Changqing
- Daxi
- Qianzhong
- Langqi
- Langfeng
- Kentian
- Dongdu
