= Jinfeng, Jiangsu =

Jinfeng 锦丰镇
- Town
- Location in Jiangsu
- Coordinates: 31°57′54″N 120°38′30″E
- Country: People's Republic of China
- Province: Jiangsu
- Prefecture-level city: Suzhou
- County-level city: Zhangjiagang
- Time zone: UTC+8 (China Standard)

Jinfeng (simplified Chinese: 锦丰; traditional Chinese: 錦豐; pinyin: Jǐnfēng) is a town under the administration of Zhangjiagang, Jiangsu, China. As of 2018, it has 11 residential communities and 24 villages under its administration.
