= Jinfeng Township, Hunan =

Jinfeng Township 金凤乡
- Township
- Location in Hunan
- Coordinates: 27°58′01″N 111°01′32″E
- Country: People's Republic of China
- Province: Hunan
- Prefecture-level city: Loudi
- County: Xinhua County

Area
  - Total: 113 km^{2} (44 sq mi)

Population
  - Total: 35,000
  - Density: 310/km^{2} (800/sq mi)
- Time zone: UTC+8 (China Standard)
- Postal code: 417608
- Area code: 0738

Jinfeng Township (simplified Chinese: 金凤乡; traditional Chinese: 金鳳鄉; pinyin: Jīnfèng Xiāng) is a rural township in Xinhua County, Hunan Province, People's Republic of China.

== Administrative divisions ==
As of 2018, it has 13 villages under its administration. They are: Jinfeng Village (金凤村), Dawan Village (大湾村), Guanghui Village (光辉村), Weijia Village (魏家村), Yangque Village (阳雀村), Yanshanwan Village (岩山湾村), Jiaqiao Village (架桥村), Tielu Village (铁炉村), Huaban Village (滑板村), Jiulongshan Village (九龙山村), Daping Village (大坪村), Sunyashan Village (笋芽山村), and Pingyou Village (坪油村).
