= Jinfeng, Mianyang =

Jinfeng 金峰镇
- Town
- Location in Sichuan
- Coordinates: 31°20′31″N 104°38′8″E
- Country: People's Republic of China
- Province: Sichuan
- Prefecture-level city: Mianyang
- District: Fucheng District
- Time zone: UTC+8 (China Standard)

Jinfeng (Chinese: 金峰; pinyin: Jīnfēng) is a town under the administration of Fucheng District, Mianyang, Sichuan, China. As of 2018, it has one residential community and 8 villages under its administration.
