= Jinfeng, Nanchong =

Jinfeng 金凤镇
- Town
- Location in Sichuan
- Coordinates: 30°34′52″N 105°54′59″E
- Country: People's Republic of China
- Autonomous region: Sichuan
- Prefecture-level city: Nanchong
- District: Jialing District
- Time zone: UTC+8 (China Standard)

Jinfeng (simplified Chinese: 金凤; traditional Chinese: 金鳳; pinyin: Jīnfèng) is a town under the administration of Jialing District, Nanchong, Sichuan, China. As of 2018, it has two residential communities and 21 villages under its administration.
