= Changle, Fuzhou =

District of Fuzhou, China

Changle 长乐区 Diongloh; Changlo
- District
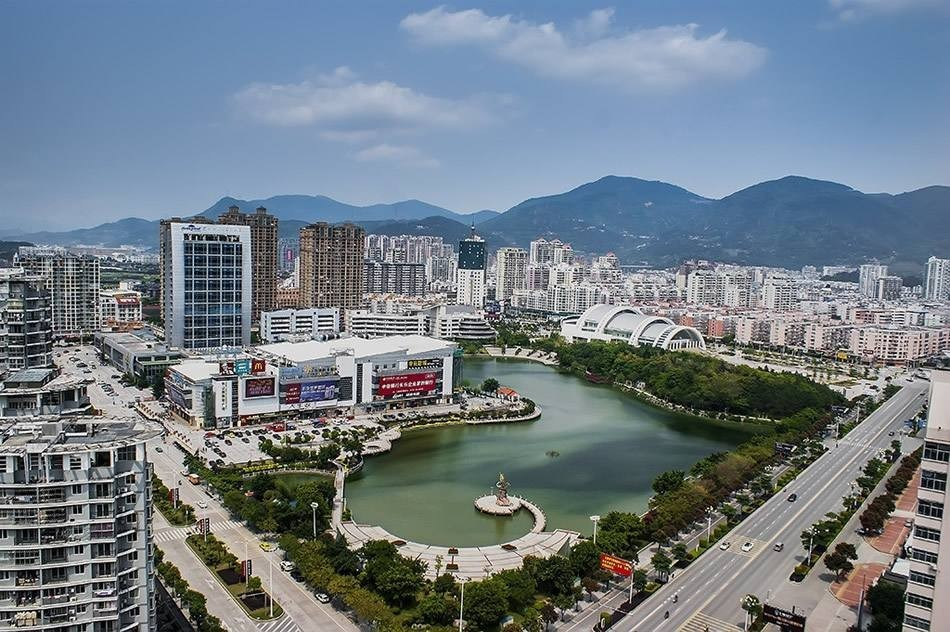
- Nickname: Hometown of Overseas Chinese
- Location in Fujian
- Coordinates: 25°55′N 119°33′E
- Country: People's Republic of China
- Province: Fujian
- Prefecture-level city: Fuzhou

Area
  - District: 690.2 km^{2} (266.5 sq mi)

Population (2020)
  - District: 790,262
  - Density: 1,145/km^{2} (2,965/sq mi)
  - Urban: 474,261 (60%)
  - Rural: 316,001 (40%)
- Time zone: UTC+8 (China Standard)

Changle (Changle; simplified Chinese: 长乐; traditional Chinese: 長樂; pinyin: Chánglè, Foochow Romanized: Diòng-lŏ̤h) is one of 6 urban districts of the prefecture-level city of Fuzhou, the capital of Fujian Province, China. It occupies a land area of 648 square kilometers (250 sq mi) and a sea area of 1,327 square kilometers (512 sq mi). Changle was established in the sixth year of Emperor Wude (AD 623) during the Tang dynasty, was a capital of the succeeding Min Kingdom, and became a county-level city on February 18, 1994. The district faces the East China Sea and is connected to Mawei district by the Min River. Due to an increase in businesses, the province is now one of the richest provinces in China. The city was upgraded to a district in August 2017 by a government proposal.

Located 30 kilometers (19 mi) outside downtown Fuzhou, Changle has a total population of 680,000 and is a prominent qiaoxiang to more than 700,000 overseas Chinese across the world.

== Transportation ==
=== Air ===
The Fuzhou Changle International Airport is a major airport located in the Zhanggang Subdistrict (formerly, Zhanggang Town) of Changle. This airport services the entire northern Fujian area, and it has regular scheduled flights to many domestic and international destinations.

=== Major highways ===
Airport Express Way (Toll Road), Shenghai Express Way and Fujian Provincial Highways S201 and S203

=== Railways ===
Presently, there are no railways in Changle. (The Fuxia Railway skirts the western edge of the district, but has no stations there.) The closest railway stations are in Fuzhou.

However, in November 2012 a plan has been approved for an 88.5-km-long railway from Fuzhou to Pingtan Island. The railway will run across Changle, and will have 3 stations within the district (Changle, Changle East, and Songxia (松下)). It is expected that the work will start by the end of 2012, and would take about five and a half years.

== Demographics ==
=== Overseas Changle ===
Natives of Changle receive large amount of financial support from overseas, due to there being a significant population of immigrants from Changle overseas, particularly in the US and Canada. The focal point for the US is in New York City with Fuzhouese ethnic enclaves present in all five boroughs. Notable enclaves include Little Fuzhou in East Broadway of Chinatown, Manhattan and more recently, due to gentrification, in Flushing, Queens and 8th avenue of Sunset Park, Brooklyn. A 2001 study by the Changle government found that about 400,000 people from Changle and their descendants were living abroad.

The area has been nicknamed the "Hometown of Overseas Chinese" due to the large number of natives that have move abroad.

=== Notable natives and residents ===
- One well known Changle native is author Shie Wan Yin, whose pen name is Bing Xin
- Changle is the ancestral home of Zheng Zhenduo, a master of literature.
- Naval explorer, Admiral Zheng He

=== Migrant workers ===
Currently, there are about 200,000 non-native migrant workers working in Changle. Many of them come from Sichuan province.

== Climate ==
Climate data for Changle, elevation 26 m (85 ft), (1991–2020 normals, extremes 1981–present)
Month	Jan	Feb	Mar	Apr	May	Jun	Jul	Aug	Sep	Oct	Nov	Dec	Year
Record high °C (°F)	27.5 (81.5)	27.7 (81.9)	32.0 (89.6)	33.2 (91.8)	36.4 (97.5)	36.5 (97.7)	40.6 (105.1)	37.6 (99.7)	37.8 (100.0)	34.4 (93.9)	32.0 (89.6)	29.0 (84.2)	40.6 (105.1)
Mean daily maximum °C (°F)	14.9 (58.8)	15.7 (60.3)	18.3 (64.9)	23.0 (73.4)	26.9 (80.4)	30.2 (86.4)	33.3 (91.9)	32.8 (91.0)	30.2 (86.4)	26.0 (78.8)	22.0 (71.6)	17.3 (63.1)	24.2 (75.6)
Daily mean °C (°F)	11.3 (52.3)	11.7 (53.1)	14.1 (57.4)	18.6 (65.5)	22.9 (73.2)	26.5 (79.7)	29.2 (84.6)	28.8 (83.8)	26.5 (79.7)	22.5 (72.5)	18.6 (65.5)	13.7 (56.7)	20.4 (68.7)
Mean daily minimum °C (°F)	9.0 (48.2)	9.2 (48.6)	11.3 (52.3)	15.6 (60.1)	20.1 (68.2)	23.9 (75.0)	26.2 (79.2)	26.1 (79.0)	24.0 (75.2)	19.9 (67.8)	16.1 (61.0)	11.2 (52.2)	17.7 (63.9)
Record low °C (°F)	−1.8 (28.8)	−0.2 (31.6)	−0.4 (31.3)	6.4 (43.5)	10.7 (51.3)	15.2 (59.4)	20.1 (68.2)	21.7 (71.1)	16.2 (61.2)	9.7 (49.5)	4.8 (40.6)	−1.1 (30.0)	−1.8 (28.8)
Average precipitation mm (inches)	57.6 (2.27)	77.4 (3.05)	116.1 (4.57)	131.6 (5.18)	168.0 (6.61)	237.2 (9.34)	163.2 (6.43)	224.9 (8.85)	170.6 (6.72)	61.5 (2.42)	54.3 (2.14)	44.4 (1.75)	1,506.8 (59.33)
Average precipitation days (≥ 0.1 mm)	9.6	12.6	15.7	14.7	16.2	15.2	9.6	13.0	12.8	7.8	8.6	8.8	144.6
Average snowy days	0	0.1	0	0	0	0	0	0	0	0	0	0.1	0.2
Average relative humidity (%)	74	76	77	77	79	81	76	77	76	71	73	71	76
Mean monthly sunshine hours	88.3	81.7	99.5	119.4	130.9	148.0	241.0	209.8	168.3	154.1	100.4	95.7	1,637.1
Percentage possible sunshine	27	26	27	31	31	36	58	52	46	43	31	29	36
Source: China Meteorological Administration all-time extreme temperaturesAll-time May high

== Tourist attractions ==
One of the attractions in Changle is the natural environment. Situated on the banks of the Min River, the region is surrounded by mountains and hills. There are many parks and trails which are destinations for locals and tourists alike. However, industrialization of the region has impacted these areas.

Some of the tourist attractions include Xiasha Seaside Vocational Center, Jingang Leg, Bing Xing Literacy Archives, and Nanshan Park. A number of overseas remittances, particularly from the US, has been used to construct some of these areas, particularly the parks, over the last few years. Because of this, many of these areas are essentially new and attract a considerable number of visitors.

Some attractions are:

- Zheng He Museum and Park (郑和博物馆)
- Jin Gang Tui Park (A Buddhist's Giant Leg) (金刚腿公园)

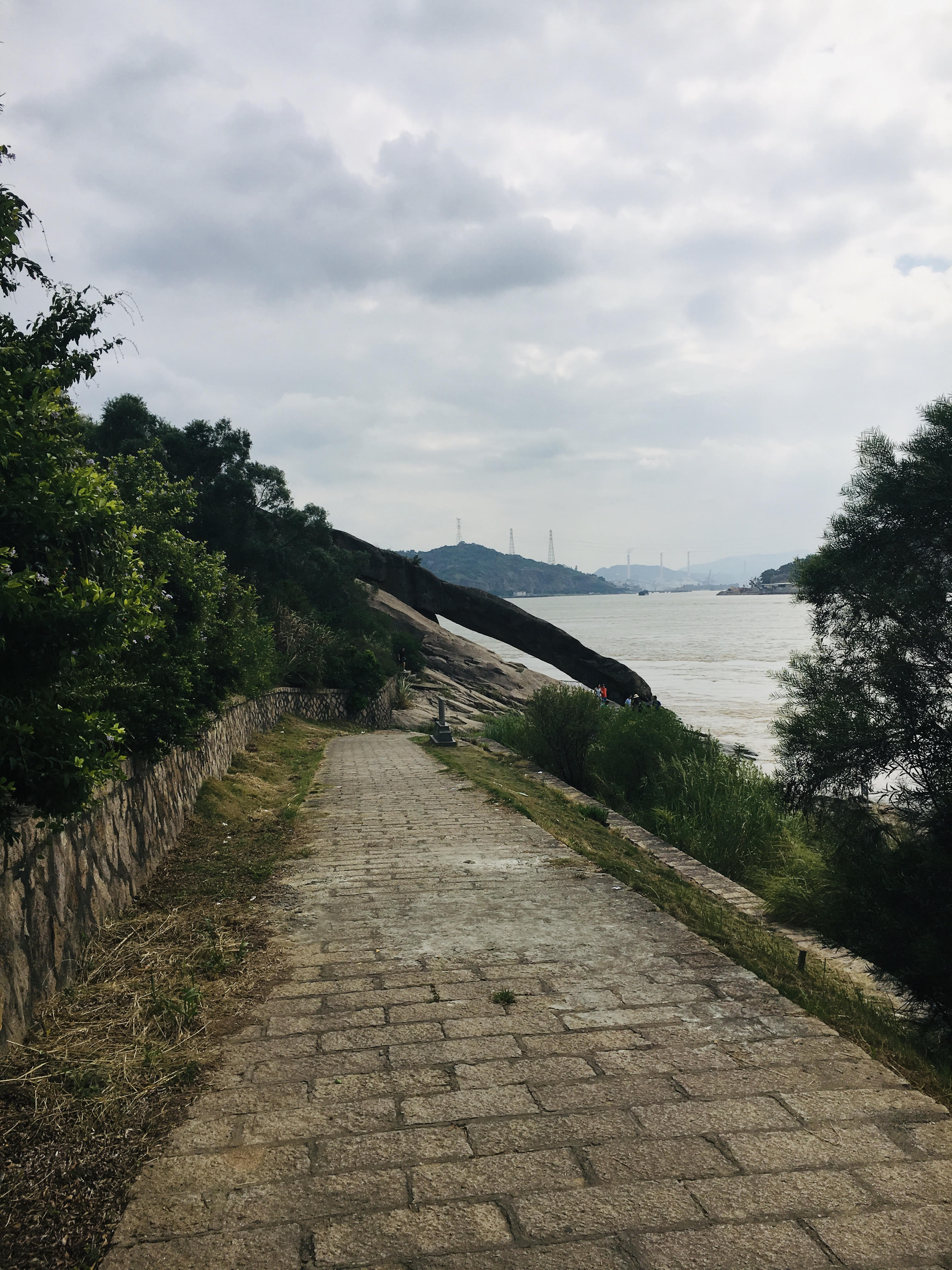

- Bing Xin Museum (冰心博物馆)
- Qinjiang Manzu Village (琴江满族村)
- Xiasha Beach Resort (下沙海滨度假村)
- Xianyin Palace (显应宫)
- Tianfei Palace (天妃宫)
- Hexia Street (Beneath River Street) (河下街)

== Culture ==
=== Local language ===
Most locals are capable of speaking both Mandarin Chinese (Putonghua) and the Fuzhou dialect, though Mandarin is spoken in more formal settings such as schools.

At home, Fuzhou dialect is the norm. Older generations typically have a strong accent when speaking in Mandarin due to their mother tongue being the Fuzhou dialect, which does not distinguish between z and zh, c and ch, s and sh initials or n and ng finals.

The Fuzhou dialect (Changle dialect 福州/長樂話) faces a high risk of extinction due to the government policy that intends to normalize Mandarin Chinese. Some locals are concerned that this will lead to the gradual disappearance of their cultural identity. Though the dialect is expected to remain one of the most spoken languages in the Changle area, it is primarily spoken by the older generation. Though the younger generations are fluent to a degree because of their environment and family, generational attrition of the language will cause a continual drop in the number of speakers. The areas where the local dialect is the strongest are primarily in the surrounding towns and areas, which are typically less economically developed than Changle.

The younger generation prefers pop culture, arts, music and other forms of entertainment from Hong Kong and the West. The older generation of Changleners enjoy Min Opera, a form of Chinese opera.

== Cuisine ==
Due to geographic location, Changle cuisine consists of a lot of seafood, such as clam, shrimp, conch, sea snails, etc.

- Fish balls (鱼丸) A ball-shaped food made from minced fish meat, egg whites, and sweet potato starch. It is known for its chewy texture and umami taste. Some fish balls contain no fillings, while others contain a filling made from minced pork and scallions.
- Fish Noodles (鱼面) A noodle made from fish and starch.
- Bian Rou (扁肉) Literally means "ground meat." It is Fujian style wonton soup. It features a thin wonton skin and a pork filling.
- Rou Yan (肉燕) It literally translates to "Meat Swallow", as in the passerine birds. It is very similar to Bian Rou, but the wrapper of Rou Yan is made from pork meat. The locals use lean pork and pound it with a wooden stick, then combine sweet potato starch with the pork to make the wrapper. The fillings consist of ground pork, scallion, and sometimes small dried shrimp. The name Rou Yan or "Meat Swallow" comes from the fact that the food resembles a swallow.
- Stir Noodles (拌面) Also known as Ban Mian, are noodles with a peanut butter like sauce. Although not native to Changle, Ban Mian is still common all over the district. Another common ingredient in ban mian is lard or pork fat. Although proven unhealthy, the lard adds a special fragrance to the dish. When the dish is presented to the customer, the customer is expected to quickly mix or stir the sauce and the noodle themselves, hence the dish's name. This is because the sauce is made from a combination of soy sauce, peanut butter, and lard, it can solidify very quickly.
- Fake Fish Ball (假鱼丸) Also known as Jia Yu Wan is another very common and popular Changle food. It is like the traditional fish ball, with similar fillings, but the difference is from the exterior. Unlike fish balls, which contain an exterior made of fish meat, the exteriors of fake fish balls are made from mashed potatoes combine with sweet potato starch. Many people prefer fake fish balls over fish balls because of the contrast between the sweet exterior from the potato and the savory interior pork filling.
- Ice Rice (冰饭) is a traditional dessert that originated from Changle, China. It's made with a base of sweetened water and sticky rice, a layer of bean paste, and different toppings.

== Administration ==
Changle is divided among four subdistricts, twelve towns, and two townships:

- Wuhang Subdistrict (吴航街道)
- Hangcheng Subdistrict (航城街道)
- Zhanggang Subdistrict (漳港街道)
- Yingqian Subdistrict (营前街道)
- Meihua Town (梅花镇), across from Juguang, Lienchiang, Taiwan (ROC)
- Jinfeng Town (金峰镇)
- Tantou Town (潭头镇)
- Yutian Town (玉田镇)
- Jiangtian Town (江田镇)
- Guhuai Town (古槐镇)
- Heshang Town (鹤上镇)
- Shouzhan Town (首占镇)
- Wenwusha Town (文武砂镇)
- Hunan Town (湖南镇)
- Wenling Town (文岭镇)
- Songxia Town (松下镇)
- Luolian Township (罗联乡)
- Houyu Township (猴屿乡)

== Education system ==
=== Colleges ===
- Fuzhou College of Foreign Studies and Trade, Changle Campus (Shouzhan Town) 福州外语外贸学院长乐校区，首占

=== High schools ===
- No.1 Junior High School (Wuhan Town) 长乐一中，吴航
- Huaqiao Junior High and Senior School (Wuhan Town) 长乐侨中，吴航
- No.2 Junior High School (Jinfeng Town) 长乐二中，金峰
- Changle Junior High School (formerly known as 'Changle Normal School', Wuhan Town) 长乐高级中学(原为长乐师范学校)
- No.3 Junior High School (Guhuai Town) 长乐三中，古槐
- No.7 Junior High School (Jiangtian Town) 长乐七中(或称长乐智化中学)，江田
- No.4 Junior High School (Yutian Town) 长乐四中，玉田
- No.6 Junior High School (Yingqian Town) 长乐六中，营前
- No.5 Junior High School (Tantou Town) 长乐五中，潭头

=== Middle schools ===
- Changle Chaoyang Middle School (Hangcheng Subdistrict) 长乐朝阳中学，航城

=== Elementary schools ===
- Changle Experimental Primary school (Wuyahang Subdistrict) 长乐实验小学，吴航街道
