= Zhangjiagang =

Zhangjiagang 张家港市
- County-level city
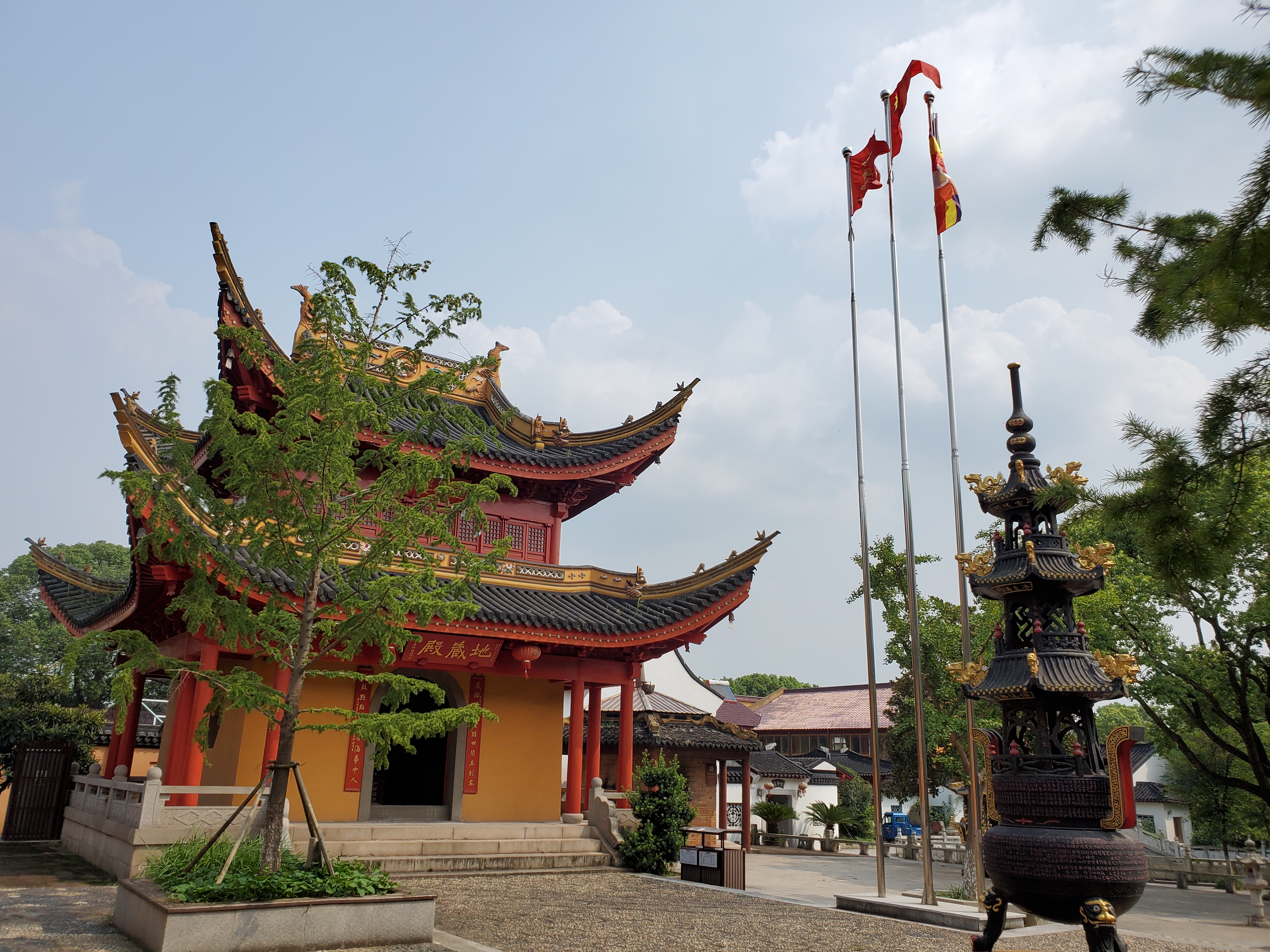

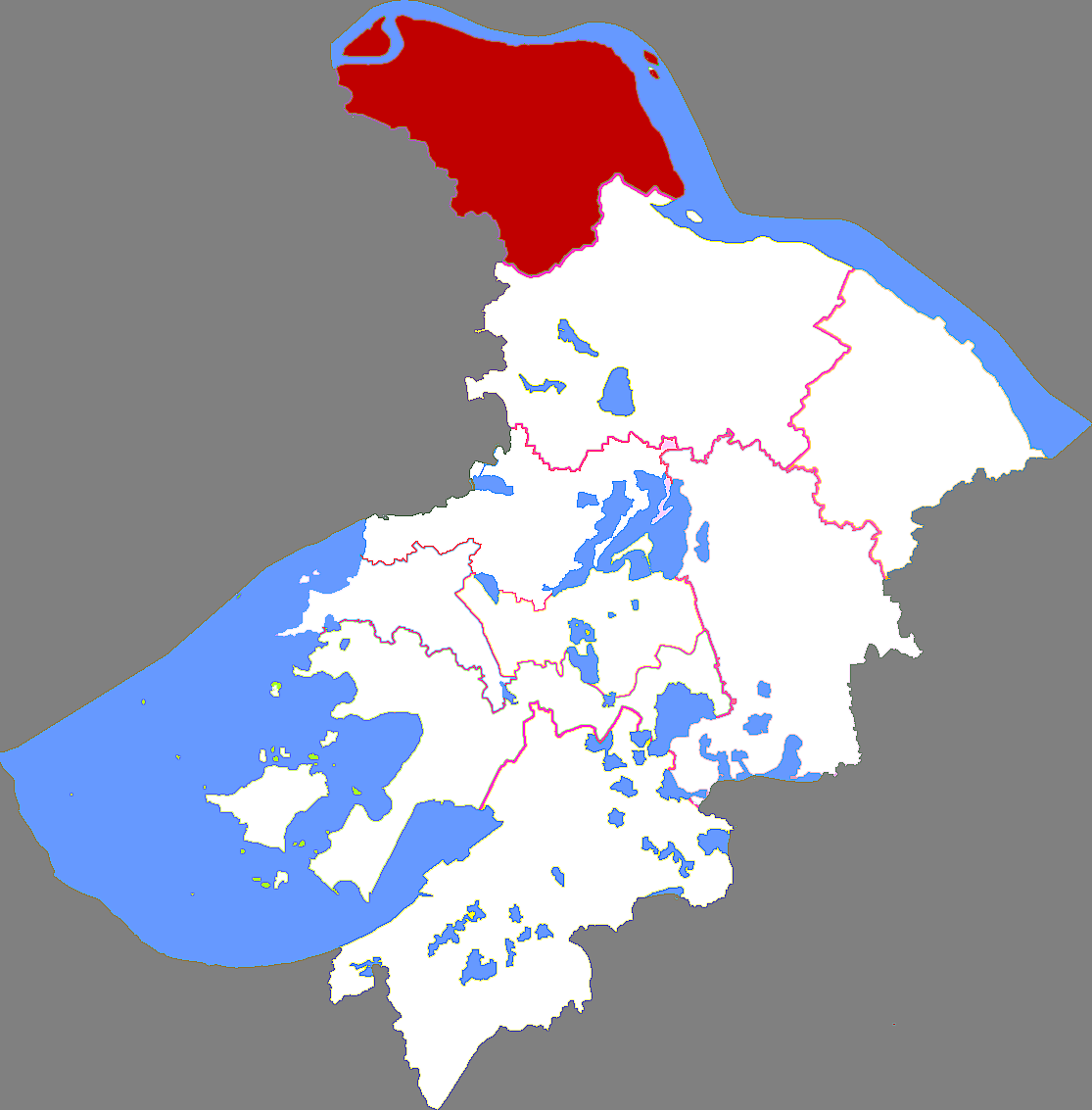
- Zhangjiagang in Suzhou

- Location of the city center in Jiangsu
- Coordinates: 31°52′36″N 120°33′22″E
- Country: People's Republic of China
- Province: Jiangsu
- Prefecture-level city: Suzhou
- Divisions: 9 towns: Yangshe, Tangqiao, Jingang, Jinfeng, Leyu, Fenghuang, Nanfeng, Daxin, Changyinsha

Area
  - County-level city: 772.4 km^{2} (298.2 sq mi)
  - Metro: 2,415.5 km^{2} (932.6 sq mi)

Population (2010 census)
  - County-level city: 1,246,762
  - Density: 1,614/km^{2} (4,181/sq mi)
  - Metro: 3,526,260
  - Metro density: 1,459.8/km^{2} (3,781.0/sq mi)
- Time zone: UTC+8 (China Standard)
- Postal code: 215600—215637
- Area code: 0512
- Vehicle registration plates: 苏EF, 苏EG, 苏EH
- Website: zjg.gov.cn

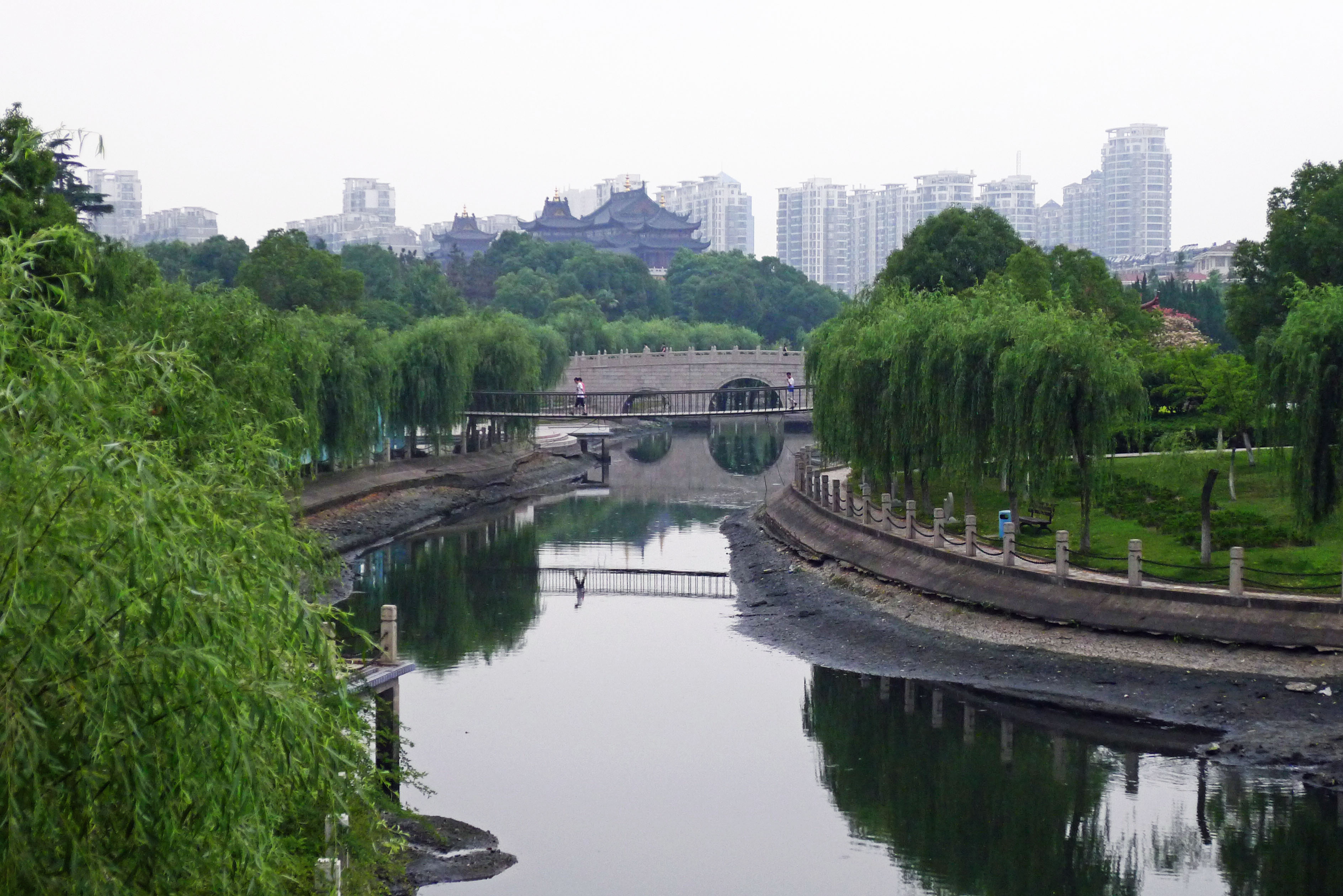
Zhangjiagang

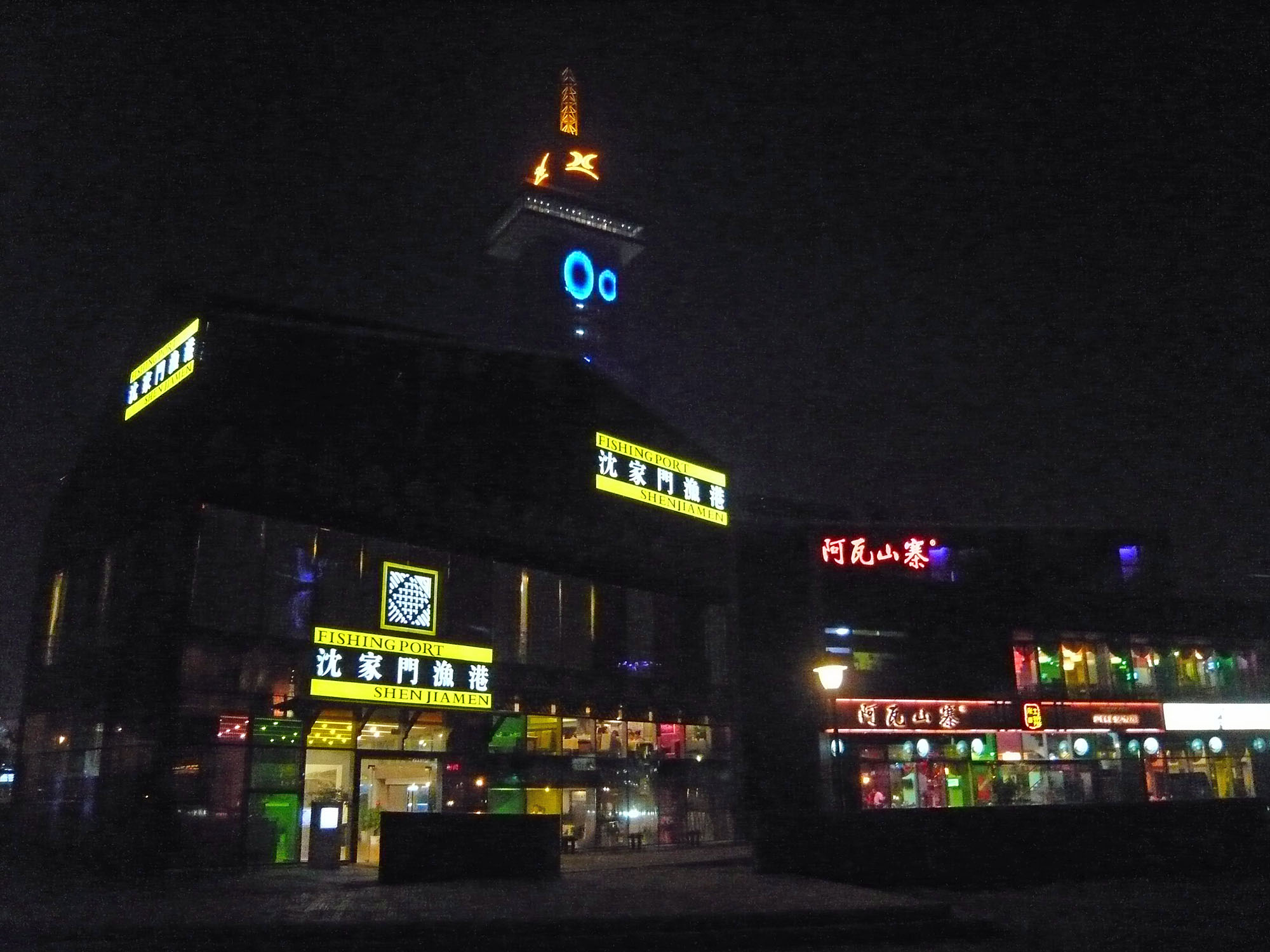
Center of Zhangjiagang

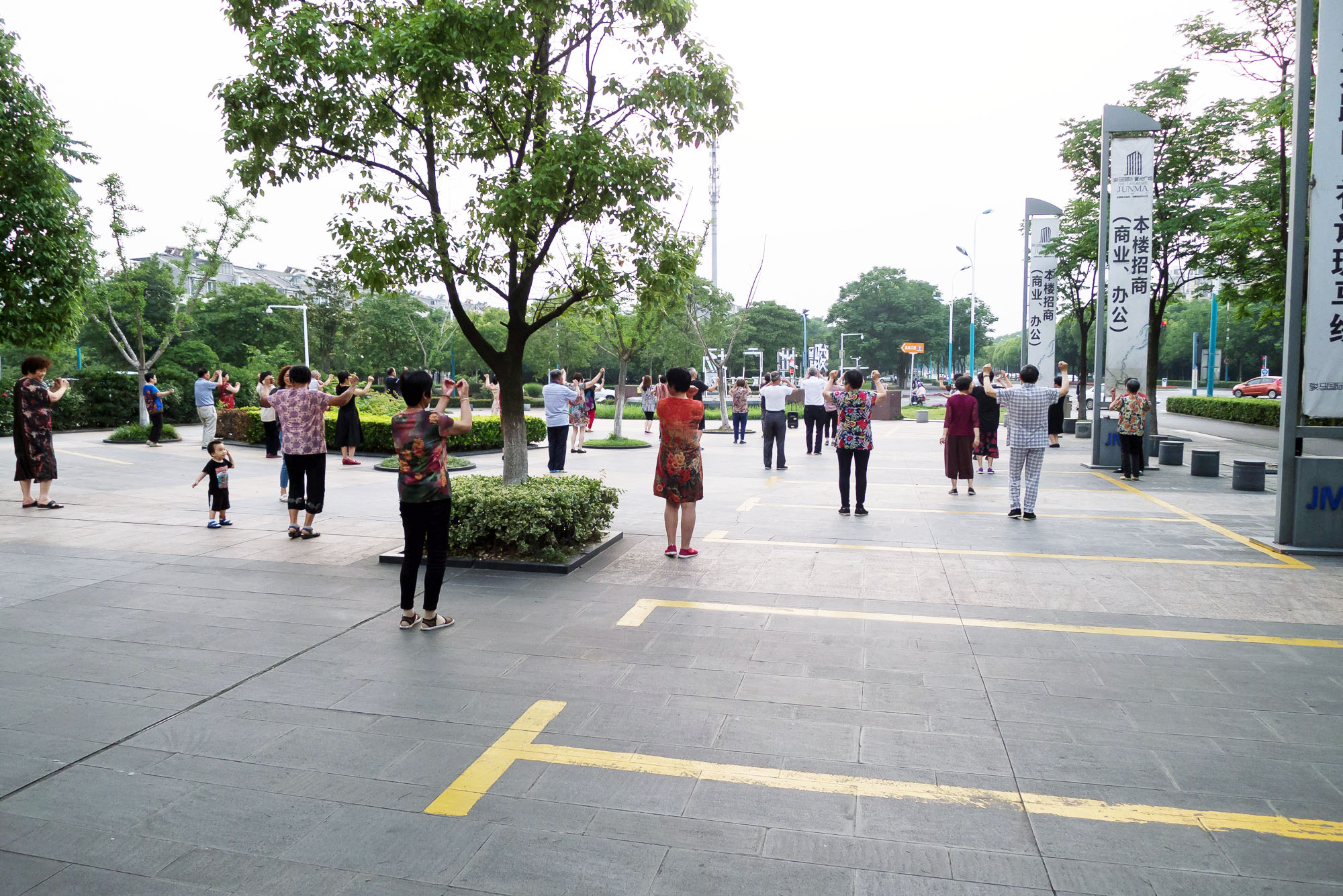
Public dancing

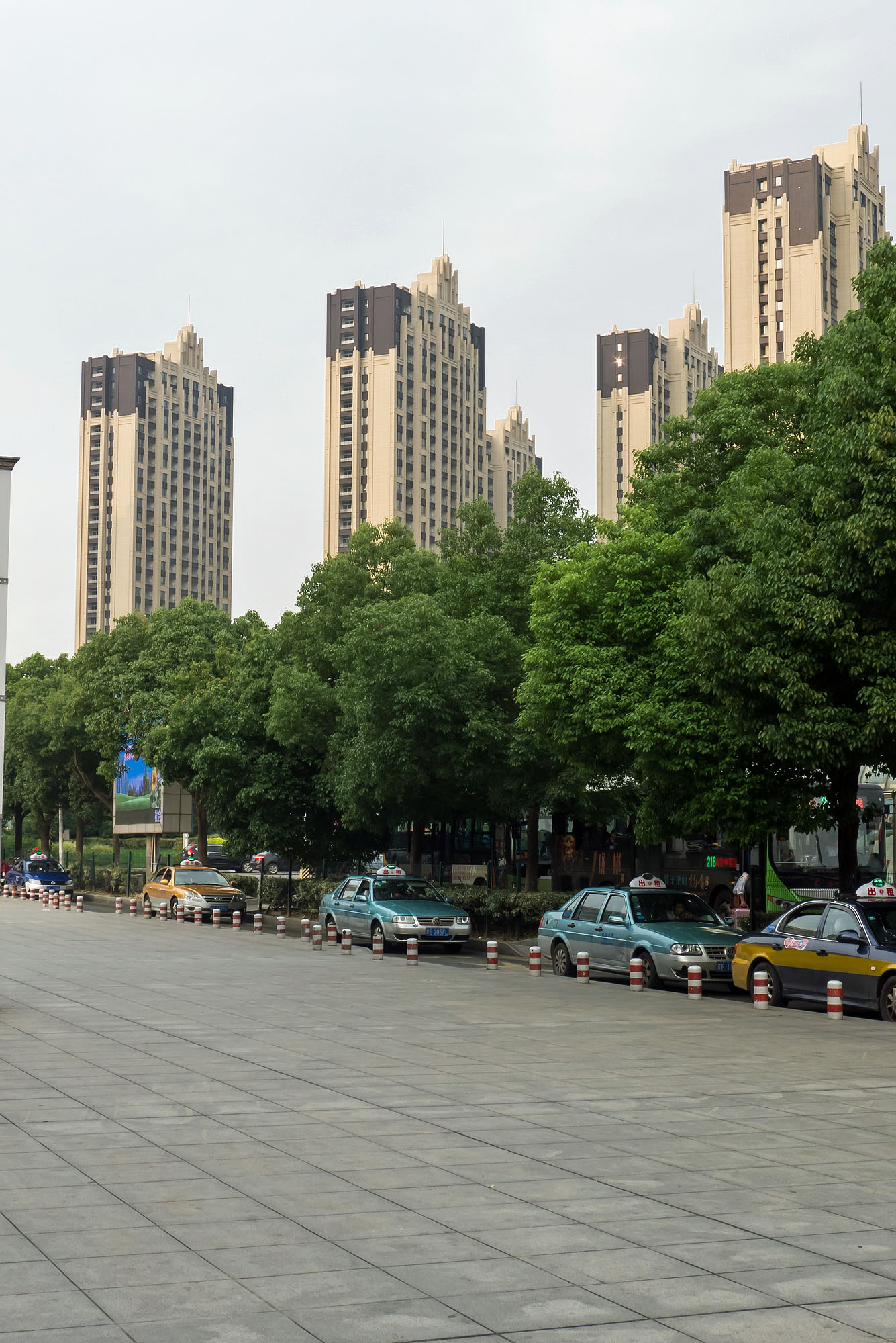
Apartment buildings

Zhangjiagang (simplified Chinese: 张家港; traditional Chinese: 張家港; pinyin: Zhāngjiāgǎng; Wade–Giles: Chang¹-chia¹-kang³; lit. 'Zhang family port'), formerly Shazhou County (Chinese: 沙洲县), is a county-level city under the administration of Suzhou, Jiangsu province, China and one of the many ports along the Yangtze river.

With 1,246,762 inhabitants as of the 2010 census, the city is now part of Jiangyin-Zhangjiagang-Jingjiang built-up or metropolitan area with 3,526,260 inhabitants. Continued growth will encompass the Yangtze River Delta metropolitan region. It borders the prefecture-level cities of Taizhou and Nantong across the Yangtze River, as well as Wuxi to the west. Its total area is 986.53 square kilometers, including a land area of 791.05 kilometers.

In the top 100 county-level city list in China, Zhangjiagang ranks the third in 2019, and 2020.

Zhangjiagang is named a National Civilized City in China in 2020, and this is the sixth time that the city achieves this honor.

== Etymology ==
Zhangjiagang is derived from a port in the city, while the port is named after a tributary, Zhangjia. All of them are written as "张家港" in Chinese. The name "Zhangjiagang" originates from a local harbor (waterway). The harbor was originally called Zhangjiagang, which roughly means "the harbor of the Zhang clan." The name itself derives from a nearby settlement where a lineage of the Zhang surname lived in concentration. Over time, the name of the harbor gradually came to refer to the entire area.

== History ==
The area of the city was under jurisdiction of Jiyang township, Piling county during the Han dynasty. It was transferred to Jiyang (then Liangfeng) county which established in 281, while the eastern part of Jiyang was separated as Nansha county in 335. Nansha was merged into Changshu and likewise Liangfeng was merged into Jiangyin. The two counties were demarcated formally by three rivers whose names were Chuan Gang, Jiejing He and South Gudu Gang since 1667. In 1874, a canal called Chang-Tong gang demarcating then Changshu and Nantong was built.

The shoals formed by alluvial deposits in varying of shape and size border the Yangtze River were called shazhou in Chinese. Thus, when the CPC established a new county which located in then Northern Changshu, it was designated as Shazhou. The county was disestablished after the Double Tenth Agreement was signed. In 1962, Changshu and Jiangyin separated their owned parts to establish a county bearing Shazhou. When the county was turned into a county-level city in 1986, it was renamed Zhangjiagang.

== Geography ==
Located 140 kilometers from Shanghai, Zhangjiagang is located along the southern banks of the Yangtze River. The land surrounding Zhangjiagang is extremely fertile, with large spans of rice paddies. In addition, many fish farms are located around the city. Many tributaries of the Yangtze have been contaminated from the construction and operation of chemical factories in the suburb areas.

== Climate ==
Climate data for Zhangjiagang, elevation 12 m (39 ft), (1991–2020 normals, extremes 1981–present)
Month	Jan	Feb	Mar	Apr	May	Jun	Jul	Aug	Sep	Oct	Nov	Dec	Year
Record high °C (°F)	20.4 (68.7)	26.6 (79.9)	33.6 (92.5)	34.4 (93.9)	35.4 (95.7)	37.6 (99.7)	38.7 (101.7)	38.6 (101.5)	37.5 (99.5)	32.6 (90.7)	28.0 (82.4)	23.4 (74.1)	38.7 (101.7)
Mean daily maximum °C (°F)	7.5 (45.5)	9.9 (49.8)	14.4 (57.9)	20.5 (68.9)	25.8 (78.4)	28.6 (83.5)	32.3 (90.1)	31.9 (89.4)	27.9 (82.2)	22.9 (73.2)	16.9 (62.4)	10.3 (50.5)	20.7 (69.3)
Daily mean °C (°F)	3.7 (38.7)	5.6 (42.1)	9.8 (49.6)	15.5 (59.9)	20.9 (69.6)	24.5 (76.1)	28.4 (83.1)	28.0 (82.4)	23.9 (75.0)	18.6 (65.5)	12.6 (54.7)	6.2 (43.2)	16.5 (61.7)
Mean daily minimum °C (°F)	0.9 (33.6)	2.4 (36.3)	6.0 (42.8)	11.2 (52.2)	16.8 (62.2)	21.2 (70.2)	25.2 (77.4)	25.1 (77.2)	20.9 (69.6)	15.1 (59.2)	9.1 (48.4)	3.1 (37.6)	13.1 (55.6)
Record low °C (°F)	−8.0 (17.6)	−7.4 (18.7)	−4.0 (24.8)	1.0 (33.8)	8.0 (46.4)	12.6 (54.7)	18.4 (65.1)	18.2 (64.8)	12.4 (54.3)	3.1 (37.6)	−2.8 (27.0)	−9.1 (15.6)	−9.1 (15.6)
Average precipitation mm (inches)	61.3 (2.41)	56.4 (2.22)	75.3 (2.96)	78.4 (3.09)	93.9 (3.70)	211.6 (8.33)	193.9 (7.63)	169.3 (6.67)	95.1 (3.74)	60.2 (2.37)	56.8 (2.24)	39.8 (1.57)	1,192 (46.93)
Average precipitation days (≥ 0.1 mm)	9.5	9.2	11.1	10.1	10.9	12.7	12.9	12.5	8.8	7.8	8.4	7.4	121.3
Average snowy days	2.9	2.1	0.8	0.1	0	0	0	0	0	0	0.2	0.8	6.9
Average relative humidity (%)	74	74	73	72	72	79	79	79	78	74	74	71	75
Mean monthly sunshine hours	116.9	121.0	143.2	168.5	176.6	129.9	178.3	185.5	160.1	161.2	134.0	132.0	1,807.2
Percentage possible sunshine	36	38	38	43	41	31	41	46	44	46	43	42	41
Source: China Meteorological Administration all-time January high

== Administration divisions ==
Zhangjiagang is a special industrial zone. The conceptualization of the port originated with urban city planner Wang Weifeng, PhD (王维锋), in 1986. Till 1993, it was a small village with no more than fields, fish farms and a small fishing port. In 1993, the area was declared an experimental industrial zone and opened up to international trade.

It is divided into 8 towns:

- Yangshe (杨舍镇, the seat of city)
- Daxin (大新镇)
- Fenghuang (凤凰镇)
- Jinfeng (锦丰镇)
- Jingang (金港镇)
- Leyu (乐余镇)
- Nanfeng (南丰镇)
- Tangqiao (塘桥镇)

Besides, Changyinsha Modern Agriculture Demonstration Zone (常阴沙现代农业示范园区), Shuangshandao Island Tourist Resort (双山岛旅游度假区), (张家港经济技术开发区), (张家港保税区), (张家港市市稻麦良种场), (张家港市畜禽良种场), and (张家港市冶金工业园) are regarded as township level administrations with actual jurisdictions.

== Economy ==
In 2019, Zhangjiagang's regional GDP reached CN¥254.726 billion, with an increase of 6.1% at comparable prices. Calculated by the registered population, the per capita GDP is CN¥273,900, which is equivalent to US$39,700 at the average exchange rate. Based on the permanent population, the per capita GDP is CN¥201,800, which is equivalent to US$29,300 at the average exchange rate.

=== Sector composition ===
Among the total GDP of Zhangjiagang in 2019, the added value of the primary industry is CN¥2.882 billion, with a decrease of 2.0%; the added value of the secondary industry is CN¥130.848 billion, with an increase of 5.3%; the added value of the tertiary industry is CN¥120.996 billion, with an increase of 7.2%. The proportion of the three industries is 1.1:51.4:47.5.

== Education ==
- Ivy Experimental High School

== Transportation ==
In 2019, there are 783 buses operating in Zhangjiagang, with 47.93 million bus passengers and 65 bus routes. At the end of the year, the city has 443,300 motor vehicles. By the end of the year, the number of privately licensed cars in the city reaches 358,100.

The city is involved in the Shanghai-Nantong Railway, the Nantong-Suzhou-Jiaxing Intercity Railway and the Southern Jiangsu Riverside Intercity Railway.

== Tourism ==
In 2019, the total tourism revenue of Zhangjiagang is CN¥19.7 billion. Among them, foreign exchange income from tourism is US$76,017,500. The number of domestic tourists received throughout the year is 9,355,900; the number of foreign tourists received is 46,100. The city has 4 national AAAA-level tourist attractions, 3 national AAA-level tourist attractions, and 1 provincial-level tourist resort.

The city is claimed to be one of 100 Chinese countries or country-level cities with the biggest potential to develop tourism in 2020 by organizations including the China Economic Herald newspaper and the China Information Industry Association.

== Language ==
Zhangjiagang, like many regions in China, has its own unique dialect that differs from the standard Mandarin Chinese spoken throughout the country. The local dialect is often referred to as Zhangjiagang dialect or Lower Yangtze Mandarin. The vast majority of the residents of Zhangjiagang belong to Han Chinese, and Zhangjiagang dialect is derived from Wu Chinese. It originated from Suzhou in the 5th century BC and is spoken by more than 8% of the population in China. It is the main local language of East China, and major cities include Shanghai, Suzhou, Hangzhou, and Wuxi. People can basically communicate with other dialects of Northern Jiangsu. through Wu Chinese.

In Zhangjiagang, Mandarin is the official language. Zhangjiagang dialect is a sub-dialect of the broader Jianghuai Mandarin (Lower Yangtze Mandarin), which is spoken in the surrounding region. This dialect is characterized by its distinctive pronunciation and vocabulary, which differ from the standard Mandarin Chinese. It contains a total of five different dialects, including Yuxi dialect, Chengdong dialect, Chengyao dialect (subdivided from Jiangyin dialect), Laosha dialect, Xinsha dialect (also known as Chongming dialect), and a small amount of Northern Jiangsu dialect. Among them, Yuxi dialect, Chengdong dialect, Laosha dialect, and Xinsha dialect are the most widely distributed and have the most populations. They have become the representative dialects of the city.

Yuxi dialect is spoken by the southeastern town of Tangqiao, which is basically the same as the Changshu urban area, commonly known as the "Changshu dialect", distributed in the southeast near Changshu, Tangqiao, and other towns and the east of Yangshe. Yuxi dialect accounts for 25.53% of the registered population.

Chengdong dialect is represented by Yangshe dialect in the urban area, it is actually the transition zone between the Wu language around Lake Tai and the surrounding districts of Suzhou. Chengdong dialect accounts for 26.4% of the registered population.

Represented by Deji, Laosha dialect is distributed in Chenyang, Daxin, and other towns in the northwest, with the using population taking up about 20.76%. Laosha dialect contains a characteristic of Jianghuai official dialect, for example, "nothing" is said to be "nope".

Xinsha dialect is also known as "Shashang dialect" and "Chongming dialect", spoken by people in Jinfeng, Sanxing, Nanfeng and other towns along the river in the northeast and Changyinsha Farm, the population who speak Xinsha dialect accounts for about 23.13%.

Northern Jiangsu dialect includes Nanhua dialect, Rugao dialect, and Taixing dialect. People in the southern part of Zhangjiagang are original residents, and the northern part is where immigrants live. Therefore, the residents in the south part are called Jiangnan (south part of Yangtze River) people in tradition, which accounts for 51.93% of the population. The rest of the residents in the north are called Shashang people and account for 48.07% of the population. These vernaculars share some basic properties like voice Sonorant. It's a complete voice produced by the vibration of the vocal tract, and it's always voiced. For example, the sound "sh" is often pronounced as "s" in Zhangjiagang dialect, and some words may be pronounced differently or have different meanings.

Despite the prevalence of Mandarin Chinese in China, regional dialects like Zhangjiagang dialect remain an essential part of local culture and identity. Many locals continue to speak the dialect daily and use it to communicate with family and friends. However, with the increasing homogenization of language and culture throughout China, the use of regional dialects like Zhangjiagang dialect is slowly declining.

In recent years, there has been a renewed interest in preserving and promoting local dialects in China, including Zhangjiagang dialect. Efforts to document and study these dialects are underway, and some schools and community organizations are offering classes in local dialects to help preserve them for future generations.

Overall, while Mandarin Chinese remains the dominant language in China, regional dialects like Zhangjiagang dialect continue to play an important role in local culture and identity. As China continues to modernize and globalize, it will be interesting to see how these dialects evolve and adapt to changing circumstances.

== Population ==
Zhangjiagang has experienced population growth over the years, with a noticeable spike between 2018 and 2019. In contrast, the household population has seen a slight decline during the same period. This could be attributed to various factors, such as migration or changes in household sizes.

As of 2022, the total permanent residence population in Zhangjiagang is 1,447,658, while the household population is 927,364. The city population is mainly consisted by the eight districts: Yangshe, Jingang, Jinfeng, Tangqiao, Fenghuang, Leyu, Nanfeng, and Daxin.

Annual permanent resident
Year	Population in 10,000 (% change from prior year)
2012-13	125.1(+0.10%)
2013-14	125.2(+0.08%)
2014-15	125.31(+0.09%)
2015-16	125.55(+0.19%)
2016-17	125.78(+0.18%)
2017-18	126.06(+0.22%)
2018-19	142.51(+13.02%)
2019-20	143.2(+0.48%)
2020-21	144.04(+0.59%)
2021-22	144.76(+0.50%)

In terms of population distribution, Yangshe District has the highest share, with 29.11% of the permanent residence population and 26.67% of the household population in 2021. Other significant districts include Jingang, Tangqiao, and Jinfeng. The remaining districts, namely Fenghuang, Leyu, Nanfeng, and Daxin, have relatively smaller populations.

Overall, Zhangjiagang's population trends show consistent growth in permanent residence, while the household population has experienced a slight decrease. The majority of the population is concentrated in the Yangshe, Jingang, Tangqiao, and Jinfeng districts, indicating that these areas are the city's key residential and economic centers.
