= Liuhe, Taicang =

Town in Jiangsu, China

Coordinates: 31.5060°N 121.2640°E

Liuhe (simplified Chinese: 浏河; traditional Chinese: 瀏河; pinyin: Liúhé; (Liuho) lit. "Liu Creek") is a town under the jurisdiction of Taicang county-level city in Suzhou, China. Liuhe has an area of 68 square kilometers (26 sq mi), with around 56 000 permanent residents.

== Name ==
Liuhe town was called Liujiagang (simplified Chinese: 刘家港; traditional Chinese: 劉家港; pinyin: Liújiāgǎng; lit. "Liu Family Harbor"). It is sometimes also encountered as Liuhegang (simplified Chinese: 刘河港; traditional Chinese: 劉河港; pinyin: Liúhégǎng; lit. "Liuhe Harbor").

== Geography ==
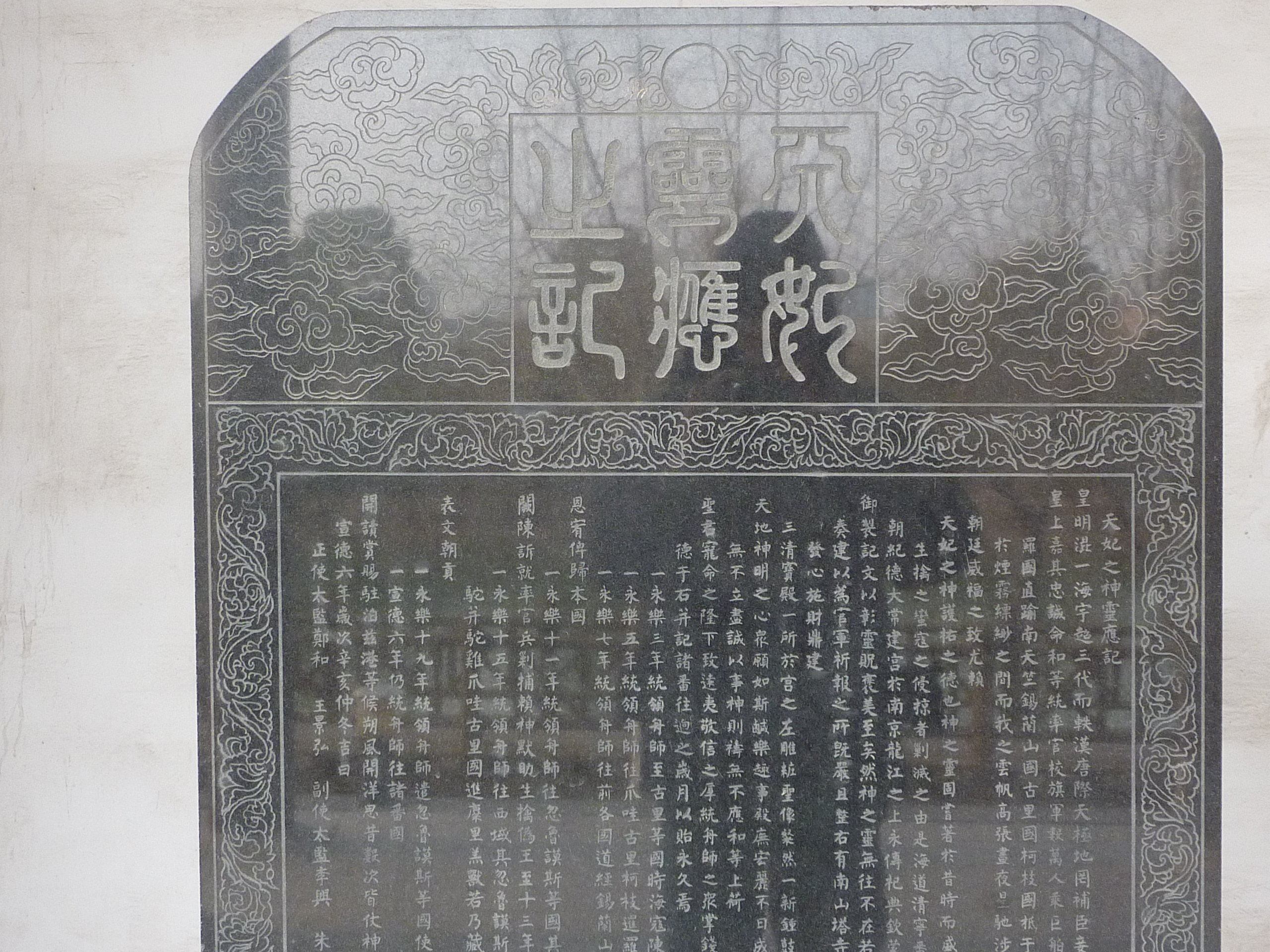
Zheng He's Liujiagang stele (modern replica)

Liuhe is located around 35 kilometers (22 mi) to the north of downtown Shanghai. It borders Fuqiao town. Owing to this placement, Liuhe is sometimes known in Chinese as the "First Town at the End of the River and the Start of the Sea".

== Famous people ==
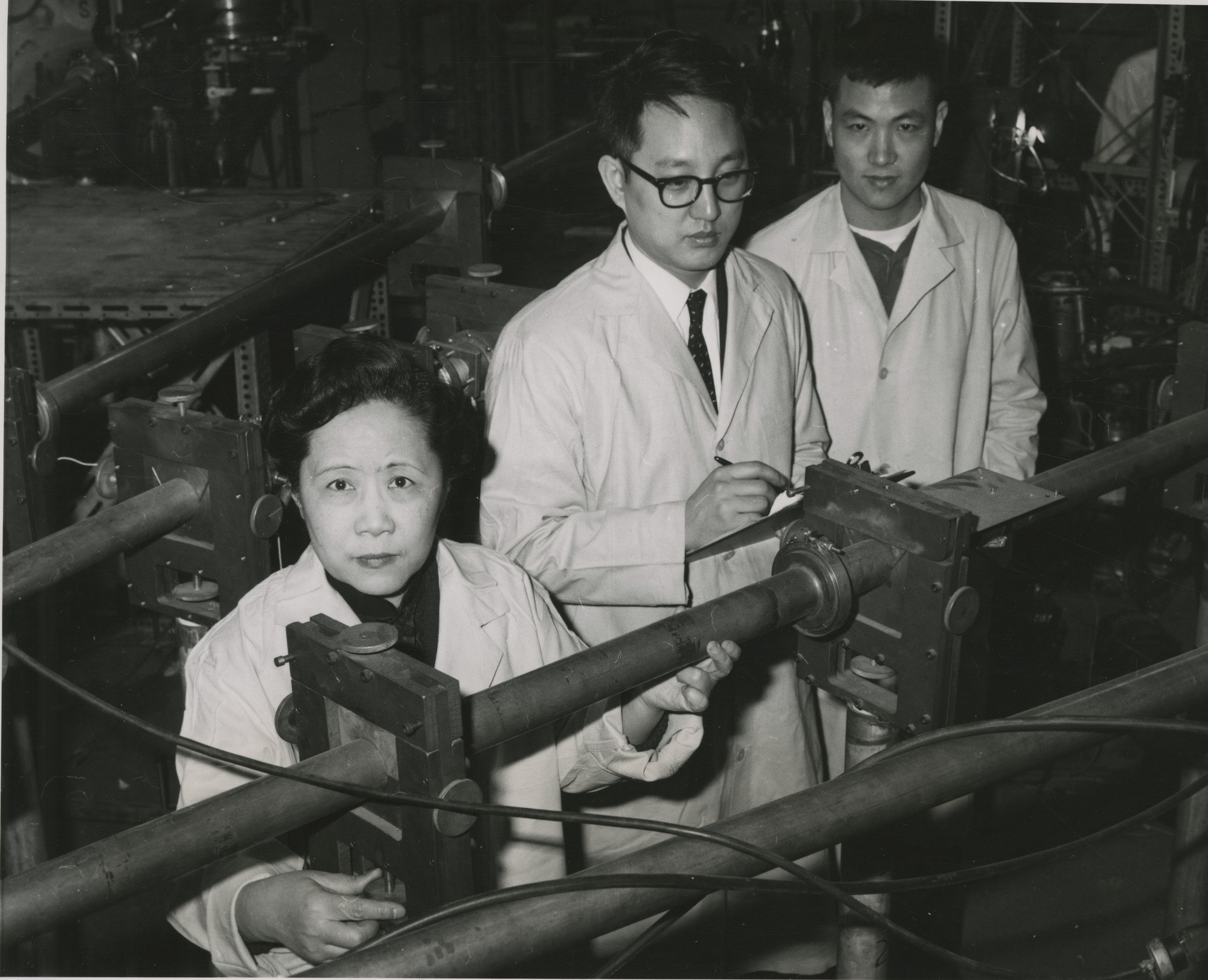
Chien-Shiung Wu, a notable experimental physicist doing research with her assistants

Famous people linked to Liuhe include:

- Chien-Shiung Wu was a Chinese physicist who lived in the United States and was born and raised in Liuhe. She is regarded as the "queen of physics" for her work on beta decay and laying the groundwork for the creation of the Standard Model in particle physics.
- Steven Chu is a Nobel Prize winner in physics, whose ancestral hometown is Liuhe.

== Industries ==
Fishing is the traditional industry in Liuhe and it is still one of the most important industries in Liuhe. Liuhe also has quite developed manufacturing. There are a few regionally famous manufacturing companies in Liuhe.

== Transportation ==
China National Highway 328 runs through Liuhe. Taicang railway station is located in Liuhe. It is served by the Shanghai–Suzhou–Nantong railway and the Shanghai–Nanjing Riverside high-speed railway. The Shanghai–Nanjing–Hefei high-speed railway is due to open at the station in 2029.
