= 2026 Tour of Chongming Island =

2026 UCI Women's World Tour, race 25 of 25

Race details
- Dates: 9-11 October
- Stages: 3
- Distance: 348.4 km (216.5 mi)
- Winning time: 8h 17' 17"

Results
Jersey awarded to the overall winner	Winner	Lorena Wiebes (NED)	(Team SD Worx–Protime)
	Second	Lara Gillespie (IRL)	(UAE Team L'Imad)
	Third	Clara Copponi (FRA)	(Lidl–Trek)
Jersey awarded to the points classification winner	Points	Lorena Wiebes (NED)	(Team SD Worx–Protime)
Jersey awarded to the mountains classification winner	Mountains	Lorena Wiebes (NED)	(Team SD Worx–Protime)
Jersey awarded to the young rider classification winner	Young rider	Zhou Menghan (CHN)	(Bodywrap LTwoo Cycling Team)
	Team	(Czech Republic) Dukla Women Cycling	

The 2026 Tour of Chongming Island was the 17th edition of the Tour of Chongming Island road cycling stage race, and the 25th event of the 2026 UCI Women's World Tour. Originally the race is the 26th of 27 race planned for 2026 Women's WorldTour, however after cancellation of Tour de Romandie Féminin and Tour of Guangxi Women, it becomes the season finale of this year's World Tour. The race begins on 9 October in Chongming and finished on 11 October, also in Chongming.

== Teams ==
Five UCI Women's WorldTeams, seven UCI Women's Continental Teams and one national team made up the thirteen teams that participated in the race. Originally all Women's WorldTeam was obligated to participate in this race, however UCI removed the obligation following the cancellation of Tour of Guangxi, leading to 5 Women's WorldTeams (Canyon//SRAM, Visma–Lease a Bike, AG Insurance–Soudal, Fenix–Premier Tech and EF Education–Oatly) to withdraw from the race.

UCI Women's WorldTeams

- Human Powered Health
- Lidl–Trek
- Liv AlUla Jayco
- Team SD Worx–Protime
- UAE Team L'Imad

UCI Women's Continental Teams

- 7 Saber Uzbekistan Cycling Team
- Aromitalia Vaiano
- Bodywrap LTwoo Cycling Team
- China Liv Pro Cycling
- Dukla Women Cycling
- Meridian Bikebug
- XDS China Women Team

National Teams

- China

== Route ==
Stage characteristics and winners
Stage	Date	Course	Distance	Type	Stage winner
1	9 October	Chongming New City Park to Chongming New City Park	110.4 km (68.6 mi)	Flat stage	Lorena Wiebes (NED)
2	10 October	Changxing to Chongming New City Park	129.4 km (80.4 mi)	Flat stage	Lorena Wiebes (NED)
3	11 October	Chongming New City Park to Chongming New City Park	108.6 km (67.5 mi)	Flat stage	Lorena Wiebes (NED)
Total			348.4 km (216.5 mi)		

== Stages ==
=== Stage 1 ===
9 October — Chongming New City Park to Chongming New City Park, 110.4 km (68.6 mi)

Stage 1 Result
Rank	Rider	Team	Time
1	Lorena Wiebes (NED)	Team SD Worx–Protime	2h 35' 09"
2	Clara Copponi (FRA)	Lidl–Trek	+ 0"
3	Lara Gillespie (IRL)	UAE Team L'Imad	+ 0"
4	Maggie Coles-Lyster (CAN)	Human Powered Health	+ 0"
5	Wen Yuandan (CHN)	XDS China Women Team	+ 0"
6	Noä Jansen (NED)	Liv AlUla Jayco	+ 0"
7	Lisa van Belle (NED)	Team SD Worx–Protime	+ 0"
8	Vendula Strakata (CZE)	Dukla Women Cycling	+ 0"
9	Petra Sevcikova (CZE)	Dukla Women Cycling	+ 0"
10	Kathrin Schweinberger (AUT)	Human Powered Health	+ 0"

General classification after Stage 1
Rank	Rider	Team	Time
1	Lorena Wiebes (NED)	Team SD Worx–Protime	2h 34' 56"
2	Clara Copponi (FRA)	Lidl–Trek	+ 7"
3	Lara Gillespie (IRL)	UAE Team L'Imad	+ 7"
4	Jarmila Machacova (CZE)	Dukla Women Cycling	+ 10"
5	Henrietta Colborne (GBR)	XDS China Women Team	+ 11"
6	Kathrin Schweinberger (AUT)	Human Powered Health	+ 12"
7	Zhan Chunrui (CHN)	Bodywrap LTwoo Cycling Team	+ 13"
8	Maggie Coles-Lyster (CAN)	Human Powered Health	+ 13"
9	Wen Yuandan (CHN)	XDS China Women Team	+ 13"
10	Noä Jansen (NED)	Liv AlUla Jayco	+ 13"

=== Stage 2 ===
10 October — Changxing to Chongming New City Park, 129.4 km (80.4 mi)

Stage 2 Result
Rank	Rider	Team	Time
1	Lorena Wiebes (NED)	Team SD Worx–Protime	3h 10' 10"
2	Lara Gillespie (IRL)	UAE Team L'Imad	+ 0"
3	Maggie Coles-Lyster (CAN)	Human Powered Health	+ 0"
4	Clara Copponi (FRA)	Lidl–Trek	+ 0"
5	Petra Sevcikova (CZE)	Dukla Women Cycling	+ 0"
6	Quinty Ton (NED)	Liv AlUla Jayco	+ 0"
7	Noä Jansen (NED)	Liv AlUla Jayco	+ 0"
8	Kathrin Schweinberger (AUT)	Human Powered Health	+ 0"
9	Vendula Strakata (CZE)	Dukla Women Cycling	+ 0"
10	Barbora Němcová (CZE)	Dukla Women Cycling	+ 0"

General classification after Stage 2
Rank	Rider	Team	Time
1	Lorena Wiebes (NED)	Team SD Worx–Protime	5h 44' 53"
2	Lara Gillespie (IRL)	UAE Team L'Imad	+ 11"
3	Clara Copponi (FRA)	Lidl–Trek	+ 17"
4	Maggie Coles-Lyster (CAN)	Human Powered Health	+ 22"
5	Kathrin Schweinberger (AUT)	Human Powered Health	+ 22"
6	Jarmila Machacova (CZE)	Dukla Women Cycling	+ 23"
7	Henrietta Colborne (GBR)	XDS China Women Team	+ 24"
8	Zhan Chunrui (CHN)	Bodywrap LTwoo Cycling Team	+ 25"
9	Noä Jansen (NED)	Liv AlUla Jayco	+ 26"
10	Petra Sevcikova (CZE)	Dukla Women Cycling	+ 26"

=== Stage 3 ===
11 October — Chongming New City Park to Chongming New City Park, 108.6 km (67.5 mi)

Stage 3 Result
Rank	Rider	Team	Time
1	Lorena Wiebes (NED)	Team SD Worx–Protime	2h 32' 34"
2	Lara Gillespie (IRL)	UAE Team L'Imad	+ 0"
3	Tang Xin (CHN)	China	+ 0"
4	Kathrin Schweinberger (AUT)	Human Powered Health	+ 0"
5	Barbora Němcová (CZE)	Dukla Women Cycling	+ 0"
6	Zeng Luyao (CHN)	XDS China Women Team	+ 0"
7	Clara Copponi (FRA)	Lidl–Trek	+ 0"
8	Petra Sevcikova (CZE)	Dukla Women Cycling	+ 0"
9	Silvia Zanardi (ITA)	Human Powered Health	+ 0"
10	Maggie Coles-Lyster (CAN)	Human Powered Health	+ 0"

Final general classification
Rank	Rider	Team	Time
1	Lorena Wiebes (NED)	Team SD Worx–Protime	8h 17' 17"
2	Lara Gillespie (IRL)	UAE Team L'Imad	+ 15"
3	Clara Copponi (FRA)	Lidl–Trek	+ 26"
4	Kathrin Schweinberger (AUT)	Human Powered Health	+ 29"
5	Maggie Coles-Lyster (CAN)	Human Powered Health	+ 30"
6	Tang Xin (CHN)	China	+ 32"
7	Margot Vanpachtenbeke (BEL)	Lidl–Trek	+ 33"
8	Jarmila Machacova (CZE)	Dukla Women Cycling	+ 33"
9	Henrietta Colborne (GBR)	XDS China Women Team	+ 34"
10	Josie Talbot (AUS)	Liv AlUla Jayco	+ 34"

== Classification leadership table ==
Classification leadership by stage
Stage	Winner	General classification	Points classification	Mountains classification	Young rider classification	Team classification
1	Lorena Wiebes	Lorena Wiebes	Lorena Wiebes (Note: On stage 2 and 3, Lara Gillespie, who was second in the points classification, wore the green jersey, because first-placed Lorena Wiebes wore the yellow jersey as the leader of the general classification.)	Lisa van Belle	Zhan Chunrui	Lidl–Trek
2	Lorena Wiebes	Lorena Wiebes	Lorena Wiebes	Lisa van Belle	Zhan Chunrui	Lidl–Trek
3	Lorena Wiebes	Lorena Wiebes	Lorena Wiebes	Lorena Wiebes	Zhou Menghan	Dukla Women Cycling
Final		Lorena Wiebes	Lorena Wiebes	Lorena Wiebes	Zhou Menghan	Dukla Women Cycling

== Classification standings ==
Legend
Denotes the winner of the general classification	Denotes the winner of the young rider classification
Denotes the winner of the points classification	Denotes the winner of the mountains classification

=== General classification ===
Final general classification (1–10)
Rank	Rider	Team	Time
1	Lorena Wiebes (NED)	Team SD Worx–Protime	8h 17' 17"
2	Lara Gillespie (IRL)	UAE Team L'Imad	+ 15"
3	Clara Copponi (FRA)	Lidl–Trek	+ 26"
4	Kathrin Schweinberger (AUT)	Human Powered Health	+ 29"
5	Maggie Coles-Lyster (CAN)	Human Powered Health	+ 30"
6	Tang Xin (CHN)	China	+ 32"
7	Margot Vanpachtenbeke (BEL)	Lidl–Trek	+ 33"
8	Jarmila Machacova (CZE)	Dukla Women Cycling	+ 33"
9	Henrietta Colborne (GBR)	XDS China Women Team	+ 34"
10	Josie Talbot (AUS)	Liv AlUla Jayco	+ 34"

=== Points classification ===
Final general classification (1–10)
Rank	Rider	Team	Points
1	Lorena Wiebes (NED)	Team SD Worx–Protime	52
2	Lara Gillespie (IRL)	UAE Team L'Imad	41
3	Clara Copponi (FRA)	Lidl–Trek	29
4	Kathrin Schweinberger (AUT)	Human Powered Health	23
5	Maggie Coles-Lyster (CAN)	Human Powered Health	22
6	Petra Sevcikova (CZE)	Dukla Women Cycling	11
7	Tang Xin (CHN)	China	10
8	Noä Jansen (NED)	Liv AlUla Jayco	9
9	Barbora Němcová (CZE)	Dukla Women Cycling	7
10	Wen Yuandan (CHN)	XDS China Women Team	7

=== Mountains classification ===
Final mountains classification (1-3)
Rank	Rider	Team	Points
1	Lorena Wiebes (NED)	Team SD Worx–Protime	1
2	Lisa van Belle (NED)	Team SD Worx–Protime	1
3	Sofie van Rooijen (NED)	UAE Team L'Imad	1

=== Young rider classification ===
Final young rider classification (1–10)
Rank	Rider	Team	Time
1	Zhou Menghan (CHN)	Bodywrap LTwoo Cycling Team	8h 17' 52"
2	Zhan Chunrui (CHN)	Bodywrap LTwoo Cycling Team	+ 0"
3	Vendula Strakata (CZE)	Dukla Women Cycling	+ 1"
4	Barbora Němcová (CZE)	Dukla Women Cycling	+ 1"
5	Lisa van Belle (NED)	Team SD Worx–Protime	+ 1"
6	Samira Ismailova (UZB)	7 Saber Uzbekistan Cycling Team	+ 1"
7	Lucia Brillante Romeo (ITA)	Aromitalia Vaiano	+ 1"
8	Eleonora La Bella (ITA)	Aromitalia Vaiano	+ 1"
9	Liu Lingxiao (CHN)	China Liv Pro Cycling	+ 1"
10	Dong Haixin (CHN)	XDS China Women Team	+ 1"

=== Team classification ===
Final team classification (1–10)
Rank	Team	Time
1	(Czech Republic) Dukla Women Cycling	24h 53' 39"
2	(Germany) Lidl–Trek	+ 0"
3	(United States) Human Powered Health	+ 0"
4	XDS China Women Team	+ 0"
5	(Netherlands) Team SD Worx–Protime	+ 0"
6	(Australia) Liv AlUla Jayco	+ 0"
7	China	+ 0"
8	7 Saber Uzbekistan Cycling Team	+ 0"
9	(China) Bodywrap LTwoo Cycling Team	+ 0"
10	(United Arab Emirates) UAE Team L'Imad	+ 0"
