= Taizhou South railway station =

Taizhou South railway station can refer to the following stations:

- Taizhou South railway station (Jiangsu) (泰州南站), a station under construction on Shanghai–Nanjing–Hefei high-speed railway, located in Taizhou, Jiangsu Province, China.
- Taizhou South railway station (Zhejiang) (台州南站), a station in Taizhou, Zhejiang Province, China
