= Dongtan, Shanghai =

Former planned development in China

Dongtan
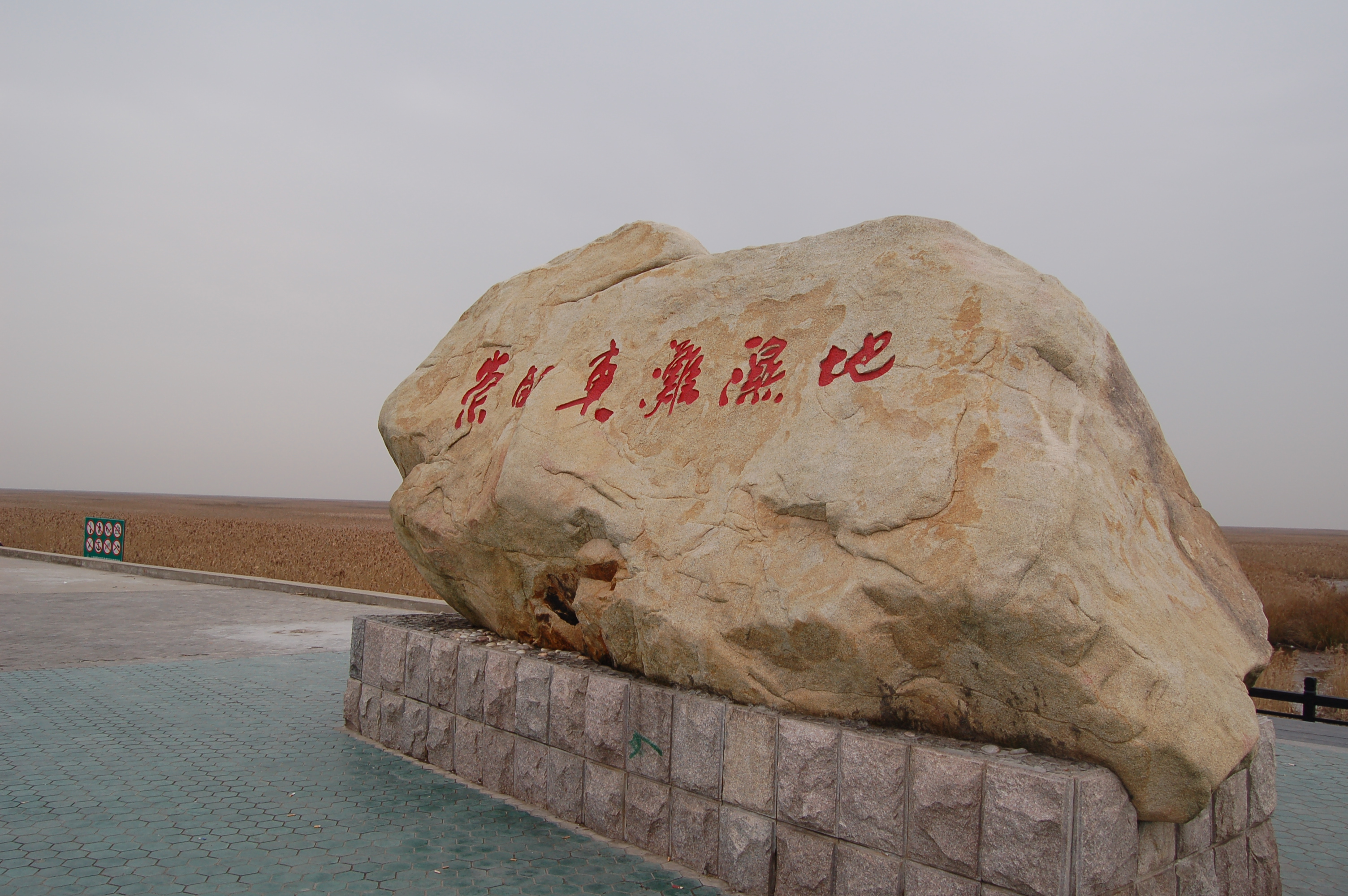
- Interactive map of Dongtan
- Coordinates: 31.519288°N 121.920261°E
- Country: China
- Municipality: Shanghai
- District: Chongming
- Elevation: 4 m (13 ft)
- Website: www.dongtan.cn

Dongtan, Shanghai
- Traditional Chinese: 東灘
- Simplified Chinese: 东滩
- Literal meaning: East Beach
Transcriptions
Standard Mandarin
- Hanyu Pinyin: Dōngtān

Dongtan was a planned development described as an eco-city on the island of Chongming in Shanghai, China that was never built. Design began in 2005, and by 2010 the development had stalled. Adjacent to booming Shanghai, designers claimed Dongtan would be the world's first truly sustainable new urban development. Dongtan was presented at the United Nations World Urban Forum by China as an example of a purpose-built eco-city.

Reasons for the project's closure include its proposed location in a high-value wetlands area, tensions between its development partners (Arup, a British engineering company, and Shanghai Industrial Investment, a state-owned developer), and loss of political support (due to the jailing of Dongtan's top political backer, former Shanghai Communist Party chief Chen Liangyu, on corruption charges in 2008).

The project has been described as a failure because it was not built. However, as an example of design it has inspired and informed other cities worldwide. Ideas from Dongtan were incorporated into the renovation of the Chongming District as a net zero island. Dongtan became a model for a subsequently planned eco-city outside Tianjin.

== Proposed design ==
Dongtan was to be located at the east end of Chongming Island, adjacent to the sensitive wetlands of the Chongming Dongtan National Nature Reserve, near the mouth of the Yangtze River and just north of Shanghai. Dongtan's first phase, a marina village of 20,000 inhabitants, was supposed to be unveiled at the 2010 World Expo in Shanghai. Some questioned the proposed city's potential effects on the surrounding wetlands. The director of the project, Peter Head, insisted it would not affect the wetlands. "First of all, water usually discharged into the river will be collected, treated, and recycled within the city boundaries," he said. "There will be a 2-mile buffer zone of eco-farm between city development and the wetlands." While farming is water intensive, relatively small amounts of water reach the plants themselves. Head said Dongtan "will capture and recycle water in the city and use recycled water to grow green vegetables hydroponically. This makes the whole water cycle much more efficient".

The developers planned to create a fully built city, with 80,000 residents by 2020. London-based Arup and the Shanghai Industrial Investment Corporation (SIIC), the city's investment branch, originally partnered to create a master plan for Dongtan, an area three quarters the size of Manhattan. Their brief called for integrated sustainable urban planning and design to create a city as close to carbon-neutral as possible within economic constraints. Project planners estimated a population of 10,000 by 2010 and 500,000 by 2050.

Energy-efficient construction, waste-to-energy systems, and wind power were all part of the original plan. As a strategic partner, Arup was to be responsible for a range of services, including urban design, sustainable energy management, waste management, renewable energy process implementation, architecture, infrastructure, and even the planning of communities and social structures. Peter Head, director of Arup's sustainable urban design, led the project for the firm from its London's office (during design, Arup claims to have offset the emissions of its team's travel to and from the site in cooperation with emissions brokerage firm CO2e). "Renewable energy will be used to reduce particulate CO_{2} emissions. Transport vehicles will run on batteries or hydrogen-fuel cells and not use any diesel or petrol, creating a relatively quiet city," according to Head's original plan. Other priorities included recycling organic waste to reduce landfills and generate clean energy. Planners in Dongtan planned to put meters in each house to display energy use.

== History ==
McKinsey & Company was involved in developing the initial vision for the project. The British engineering consultancy firm Arup was contracted in 2005 by the developer, the Shanghai Industrial Investment Company (SIIC), to design and masterplan Dongtan as the first of a planned series of eco-cities.

The 2008 conviction of prominent supporter Chen Liangyu contributed to the project's failure.

== Reaction ==
The reaction to Dongtan has been mixed. Former Mayor of London Ken Livingstone praised Dongtan as pioneering work leading to a more sustainable future. His sentiments were echoed by other prominent British politicians, including Gordon Brown and Tony Blair.

Critics have argued that Dongtan will not have a big impact on existing Chinese cities, which will still house the majority of the population.

The main designer, Thomas V. Harwood III, is also taking part in many environmentally less friendly projects in China, including airports and office blocks. In 2008, Arup received the "Greenwasher of the Year Award" from Ethical Corporation magazine.

Several sources described the project as a Potemkin village.

== Transport ==
- Dongtan station (Shanghai Metro) (东滩站), future metro station on Chongming line of Shanghai Metro, opening in 2026

== See also ==
- Julie Sze, Fantasy Islands: Chinese Dreams and Ecological Fears in an Age of Climate Crisis, 2015, Univ of California Press, ISBN 9780520959828
- Herbert Girardet and Zhao Yan, Shanghai Dongtan: An Eco-City, SIIC, 2006, ISBN 978-7542622433
- Huangbaiyu
- Masdar City
- Eco-Cities in China
