= Nanjingyuanrendong station =

Metro station in Nanjing, China

Nanjingyuanrendong 南京猿人洞
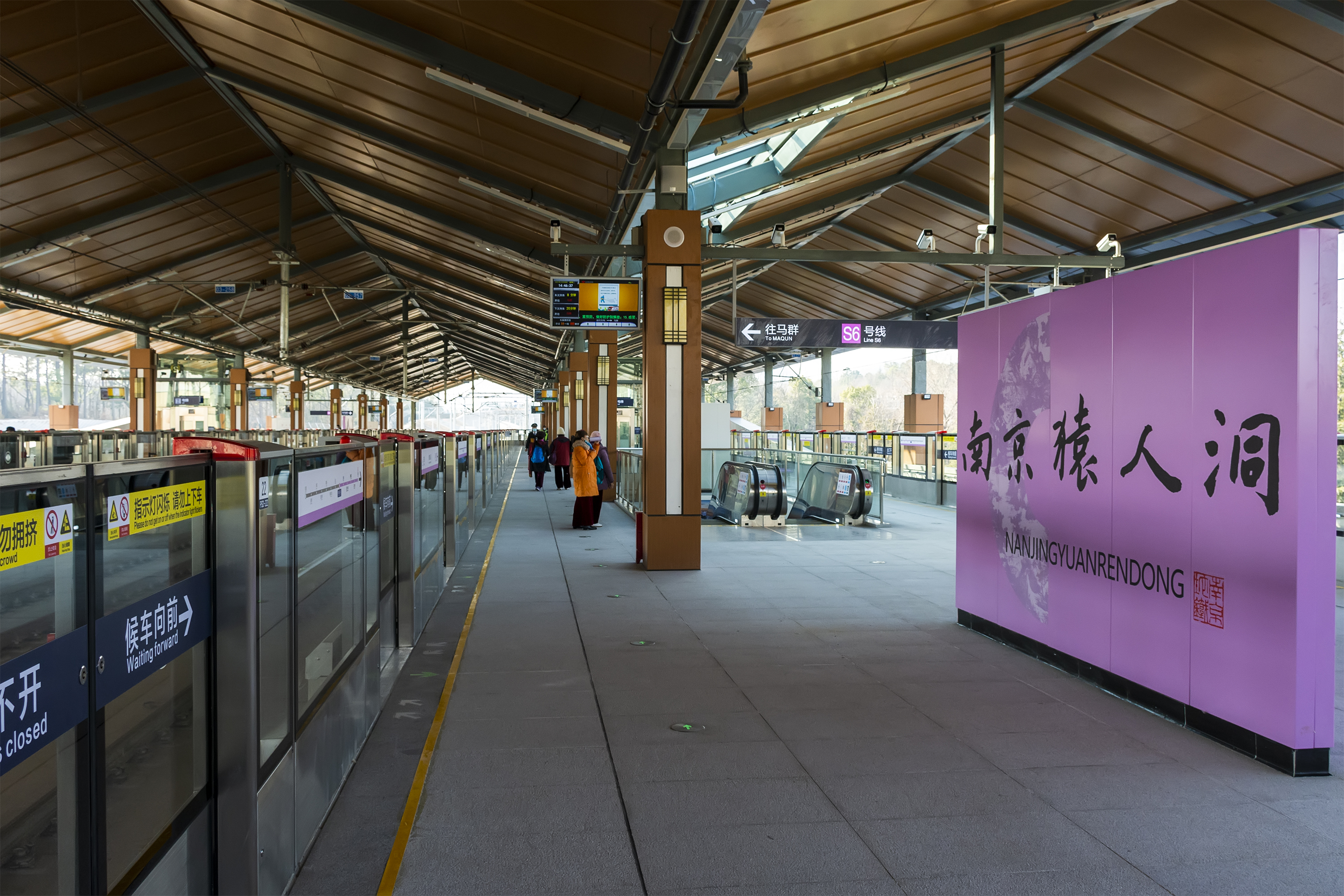
- The tracks and platforms of Nanjingyuanrendong Station in December 2022

General information
- Location: Jiangning District, Nanjing, Jiangsu; China
- Coordinates: 32.0634°N 119.0469°E
- Operated by: Nanjing Metro Co. Ltd.
- Line: Line S6
- Platforms: 4 (2 island platforms)

Construction
- Structure type: Elevated

History
- Opened: 28 December 2021

Services
Preceding station	Nanjing Metro	Following station
Guquan towards Maqun	Line S6	Tangshan towards Jurong
Location

Nanjingyuanrendong Station (Chinese: 南京猿人洞站; pinyin: Nánjīngyuánréndòng Zhàn) is one of the stations in Nanjing Metro Line S6. Its project name is Tangquanxilu Station (汤泉西路站), and it is located in Jiangning District, Nanjing. The station began operations with Line S6 on 28 December 2021. The station's namesake is the mammalian fossil bearing site of Nanjing Man.

== Station structure ==
Nanjingyuanrendong Station is located along the Nanjing-Shanghai Expressway. The second floor consists of two island platforms while the first floor is the concourse.

The train usually stops at inner tracks, but when an Express train is approaching, the previous train may stop at an outer track in order to let the express train pass through the inner track at the other side of the platform.

=== Floor Guide ===
2F; Platforms	← Line S6 to Maqun (Guquan)
2F; Platforms	Island platform
2F; Platforms	← Line S6 to Maqun (Guquan)
2F; Platforms	Line S6 to Jurong (Tangshan) →
2F; Platforms	Island platform
2F; Platforms	Line S6 to Jurong (Tangshan) →
1F; Concourse	Exits, Customer service, Vending machines

== Gallery ==
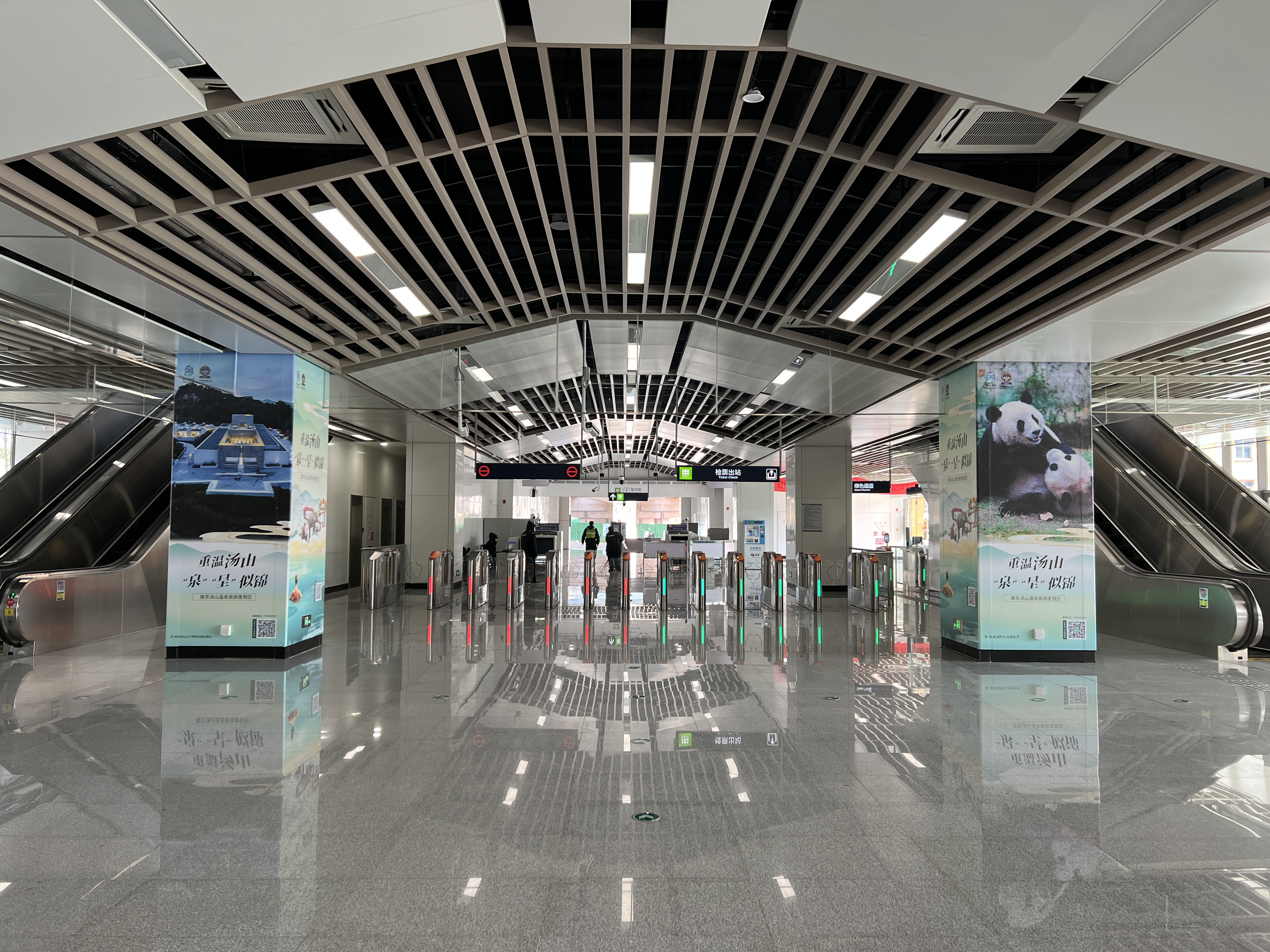
The concourse of Nanjingyuanrendong Station

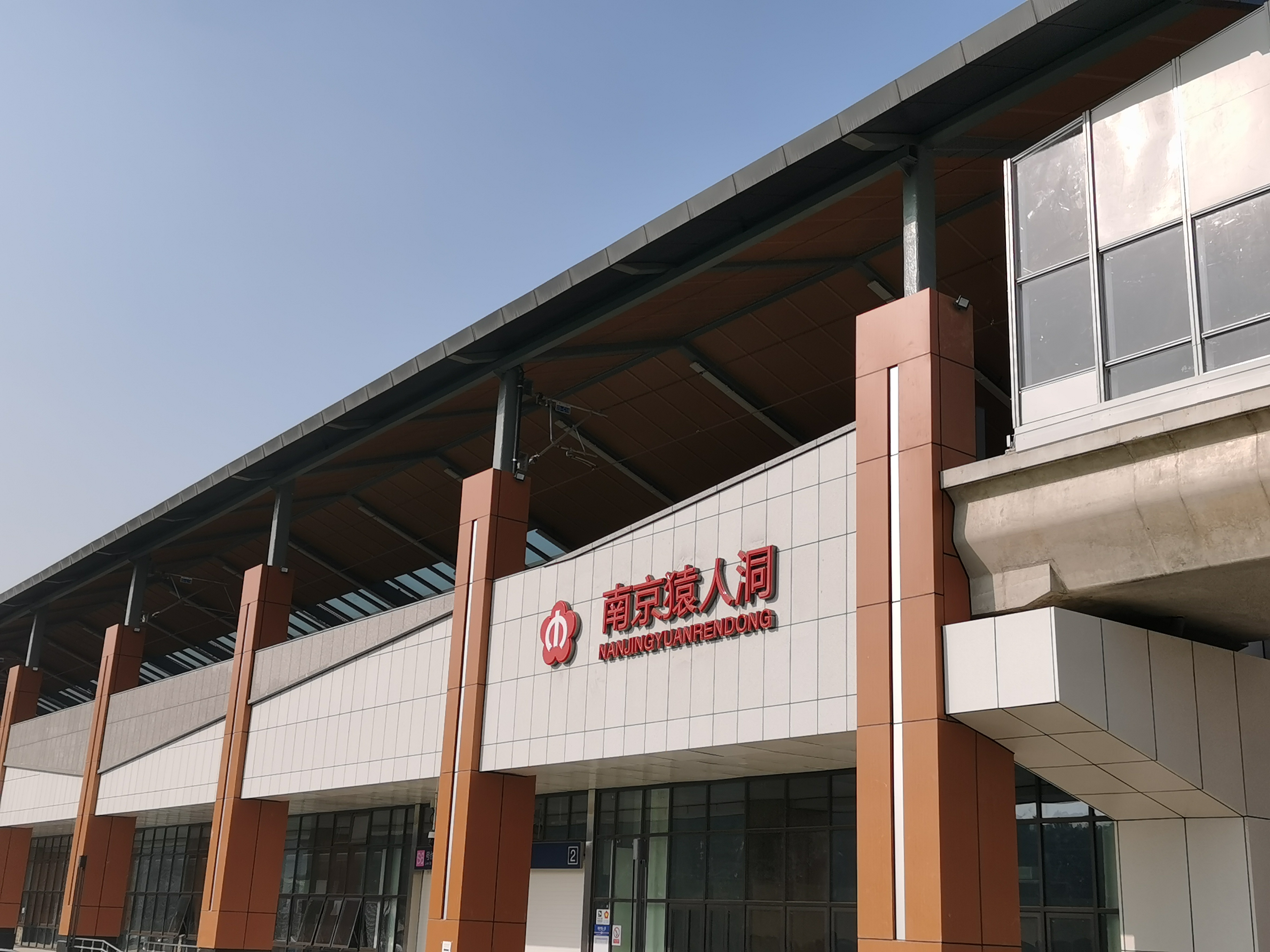
The outlook of Nanjingyuanrendong Station
