= Jurong, Jiangsu =

Jurong 句容市 Kuyung
- County-level city
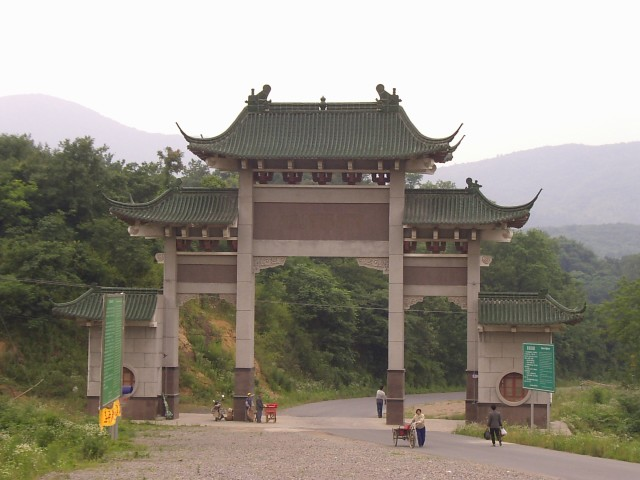
- Longchang Temple (隆昌寺)

- Location in Jiangsu
- Coordinates: 31°56′46″N 119°09′50″E
- Country: People's Republic of China
- Province: Jiangsu
- Prefecture-level city: Zhenjiang

Area
  - Total: 1,385 km^{2} (535 sq mi)

Population (2020 census)
  - Total: 639,266
  - Density: 461.6/km^{2} (1,195/sq mi)
- Time zone: UTC+8 (China Standard)
- Postal code: 212400

Jurong (Chinese: 句容; pinyin: Jùróng) is a county-level city under the administration of Zhenjiang, Jiangsu province, China.

In 129 BC, the then Prince of Changsha Liu Fa's son, Dang became the Marquis of Jurong. As he died soon, the lands enfeoffed to him became Jurong county in the next year. Jurong was under the jurisdiction of Nanjing historically, but it was annexed to the Prefecture of Zhenjiang in 1950, then Zhenjiang in 1983. The county was converted into a county-level city in 1995.

== Administrative divisions ==
At present, Jurong City has 5 towns and 1 other.

5 towns

- Huayang (华阳镇)
- Baohua (宝华镇)
- Xiashu (下蜀镇)
- Baitu (白兔镇)
- Biancheng (边城镇)

1 other

- Jurong Economic Development Zone (句容市经济开发区)

== Climate ==
Climate data for Jurong, elevation 36 m (118 ft), (1991–2020 normals, extremes 1951–present)
Month	Jan	Feb	Mar	Apr	May	Jun	Jul	Aug	Sep	Oct	Nov	Dec	Year
Record high °C (°F)	21.6 (70.9)	27.8 (82.0)	34.1 (93.4)	34.3 (93.7)	37.1 (98.8)	37.3 (99.1)	40.8 (105.4)	41.1 (106.0)	38.0 (100.4)	38.7 (101.7)	30.0 (86.0)	23.2 (73.8)	41.1 (106.0)
Mean daily maximum °C (°F)	7.1 (44.8)	9.7 (49.5)	14.6 (58.3)	21.0 (69.8)	26.2 (79.2)	28.9 (84.0)	32.1 (89.8)	31.6 (88.9)	27.6 (81.7)	22.5 (72.5)	16.4 (61.5)	9.8 (49.6)	20.6 (69.1)
Daily mean °C (°F)	2.9 (37.2)	5.1 (41.2)	9.6 (49.3)	15.6 (60.1)	21.0 (69.8)	24.6 (76.3)	28.1 (82.6)	27.5 (81.5)	23.2 (73.8)	17.5 (63.5)	11.3 (52.3)	5.1 (41.2)	16.0 (60.7)
Mean daily minimum °C (°F)	−0.3 (31.5)	1.6 (34.9)	5.5 (41.9)	10.9 (51.6)	16.4 (61.5)	21.0 (69.8)	24.8 (76.6)	24.4 (75.9)	19.8 (67.6)	13.6 (56.5)	7.3 (45.1)	1.5 (34.7)	12.2 (54.0)
Record low °C (°F)	−13.4 (7.9)	−13.8 (7.2)	−5.4 (22.3)	−1.0 (30.2)	5.4 (41.7)	12.0 (53.6)	16.3 (61.3)	17.0 (62.6)	10.1 (50.2)	−0.3 (31.5)	−5.4 (22.3)	−14.8 (5.4)	−14.8 (5.4)
Average precipitation mm (inches)	55.2 (2.17)	56.9 (2.24)	81.5 (3.21)	82.3 (3.24)	91.0 (3.58)	205.3 (8.08)	214.2 (8.43)	159.2 (6.27)	76.5 (3.01)	59.9 (2.36)	54.3 (2.14)	36.6 (1.44)	1,172.9 (46.17)
Average precipitation days (≥ 0.1 mm)	9.7	9.3	11.1	10.3	10.4	11.7	12.6	12.8	8.1	7.8	8.4	7.7	119.9
Average snowy days	3.5	2.6	1.1	0.1	0	0	0	0	0	0	0.4	1.2	8.9
Average relative humidity (%)	76	75	73	72	73	78	81	82	80	77	77	74	77
Mean monthly sunshine hours	131.6	129.4	154.7	179.5	189.2	154.8	199.8	200.1	173.2	172.3	152.3	146.7	1,983.6
Percentage possible sunshine	41	41	42	46	44	36	46	49	47	49	49	47	45
Source: China Meteorological Administration September Record High all-time January high

== Transport ==
=== Nanjing Metro ===
Several stations of Line S6 of Nanjing Metro, also known as "Nanjing–Jurong Intercity Metro" are located in Jurong. The metro line opened in December 2021.

=== China Railway ===
Jurong West railway station on the Nanjing–Hangzhou high-speed railway is situated in the southwest outskirts of the city.

Jurong railway station on the South Jiangsu Riverside high-speed railway was opened on 28 September 2023.

== See also ==
- Jurong air force base
