= Zhangjiagang railway station =

Railway station in Suzhou, Jiangsu

Zhangjiagang 张家港
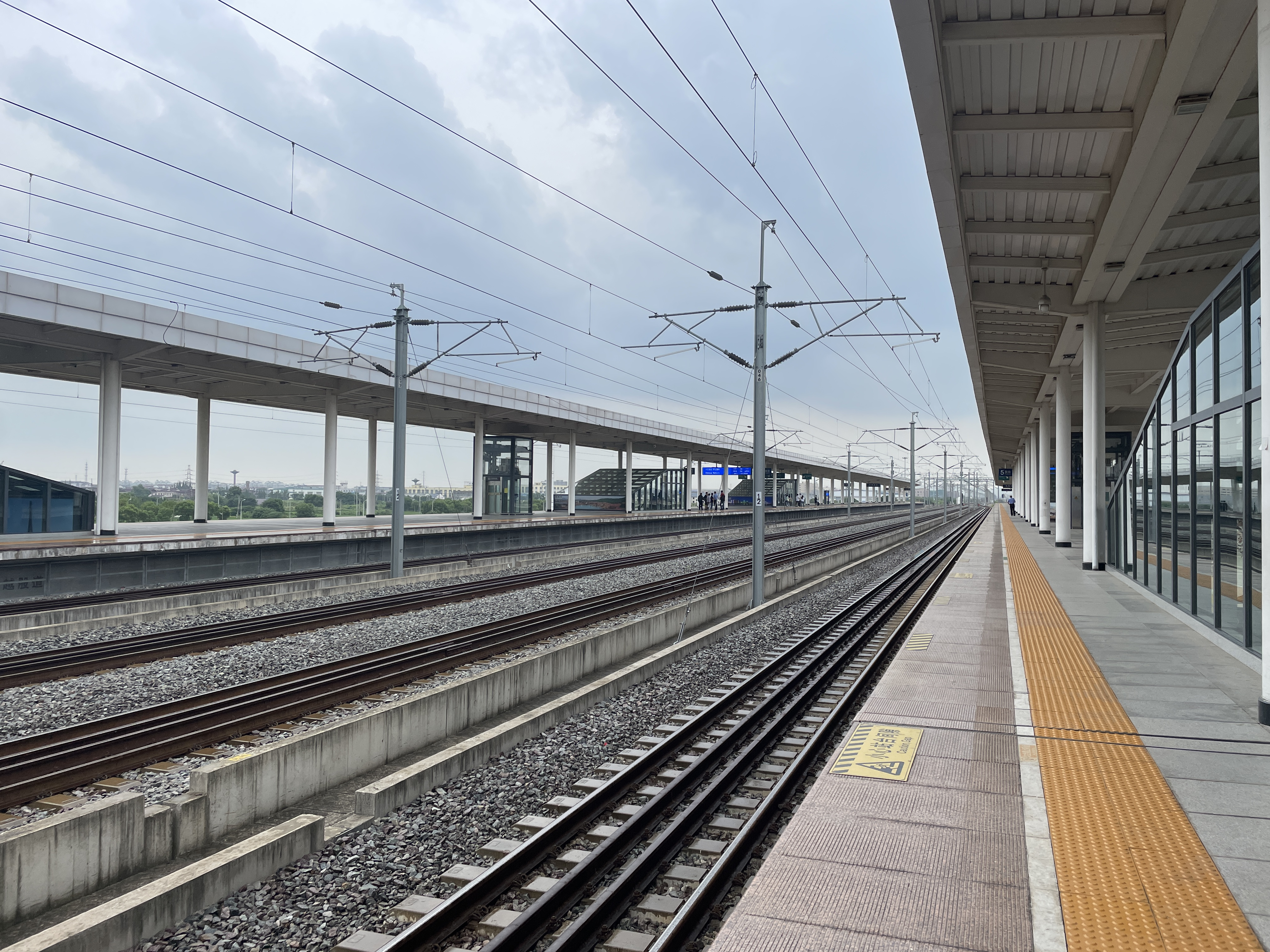

General information
- Location: Zhangjiagang, Suzhou, Jiangsu; China
- Coordinates: 31.819488°N 120.670840°E
- Line(s): Shanghai–Suzhou–Nantong railway; Shanghai–Nanjing Riverside high-speed railway; Nantong–Ningbo high-speed railway (under construction)

History
- Opened: 1 July 2020

Zhangjiagang railway station (Chinese: 张家港站) is a railway station in Zhangjiagang, Suzhou, Jiangsu, China.

== History ==
This station opened with the Shanghai–Suzhou–Nantong railway on 1 July 2020.

== Future ==
The under construction Nantong–Ningbo high-speed railway will include a stop here.

Preceding station	China Railway High-speed	Following station
Jiangyin towards Nanjing South	Shanghai–Nanjing Riverside high-speed railway	Changshu towards Taicang
