= Line S6 (Nanjing Metro) =

Metro line in Jiangsu, China

- Line S6 train

Overview
- Other names: Nanjing–Jurong intercity railway; Ningju Line; Ningju Intercity railway
- Status: In operation
- Locale: Nanjing and Jurong, Jiangsu Province
- Termini: Maqun; Jurong
- Stations: 13

Service
- Type: Rapid transit
- System: Nanjing Metro
- Operator: Nanjing Metro
- Rolling stock: 6-car Class B

History
- Opened: 28 December 2021; 4 years ago

Technical
- Line length: 43.64 km (27.1 mi)
- Character: Elevated and underground
- Track gauge: 1,435 mm (4 ft 8 1/2 in)

Line S6 of the Nanjing Metro is a rapid transit line connecting Nanjing and Jurong, Zhenjiang in Jiangsu Province, China. It is 43.64 kilometres (27.12 mi) long and has a maximum operating speed of 120 kilometres per hour (75 mph). It has opened on 28 December 2021. The line operates with a mixed express and local services using passing loops to allow for express trains to pass local ones.

The line started construction on December 21, 2018. The line is a joint venture between Nanjing Metro and the Jurong local government.

== Stations ==

Services		Station Name		Connections	Location	
L	Ex	English	Chinese	Connections	Location	
●	●	Maqun	马群	2 Qilin Tram	Qixia	Nanjing
●	●	Baishuiqiao	百水桥		Qixia	Nanjing
●	●	Qilinmen	麒麟门		Jiangning	Nanjing
●	●	Dongjiaoxiaozhen	东郊小镇		Jiangning	Nanjing
●	｜	Guquan	古泉		Jiangning	Nanjing
●	｜	Nanjingyuanrendong	南京猿人洞		Jiangning	Nanjing
●	｜	Tangshan	汤山		Jiangning	Nanjing
●	●	Quandudajie	泉都大街		Jiangning	Nanjing
●	●	Huangmei	黄梅		Jurong, Zhenjiang	
●	｜	Tongshijie	童世界		Jurong, Zhenjiang	
●	｜	Huayang	华阳		Jurong, Zhenjiang	
●	●	Chongming	崇明		Jurong, Zhenjiang	
●	●	Jurong	句容	JWH	Jurong, Zhenjiang	

== Delivery services ==
On 22 July 2026, with the support of Nanjing Metro Co., Ltd, Jiangsu Ningju Rail Transit Co., Ltd and other departments; SF Express launched the Ningju line "Rail + Express service", marking the official implementation of a new rail express delivery model in the Nanjing metropolitan area.
