= Chongming, Shanghai =

Chongming 崇明区 Tsungming
- District
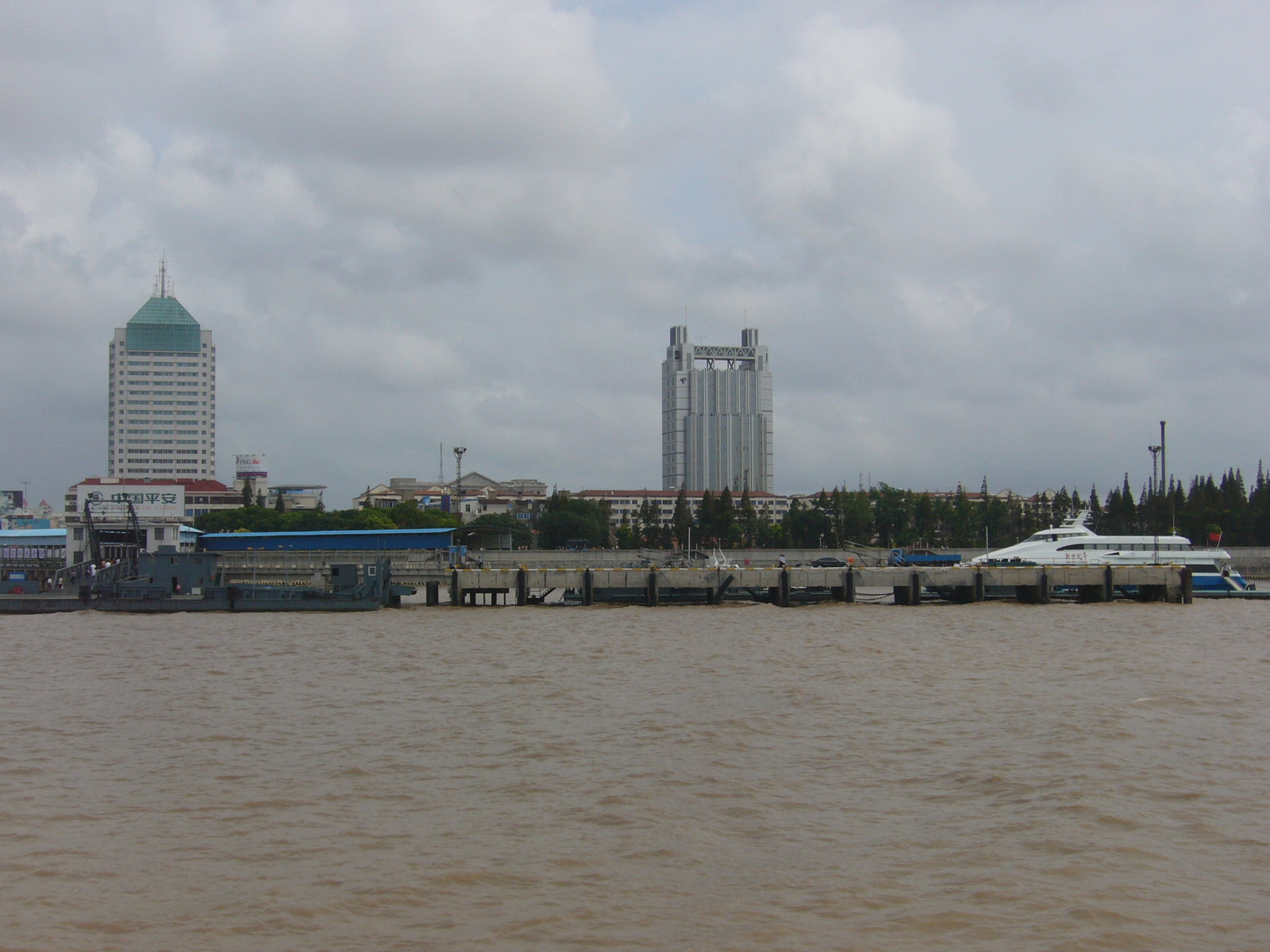
- Nanmen Port in Chengqiao, the district government seat and largest town on Chongming District.

- Location within Shanghai (Note that this map does not display either Haiyong or Qilong)
- Interactive map of Chongming
- Coordinates: 31°40′N 121°30′E
- Country: People's Republic of China
- Municipality: Shanghai

Area
  - Total: 1,411 km^{2} (545 sq mi)

Population (2020 Census)
  - Total: 637,921
  - Density: 452.1/km^{2} (1,171/sq mi)
- Time zone: UTC+8 (China Standard)
- Postal code: 202100
- Area code: 21
- Website: www.shcm.gov.cn

Chongming District is the northernmost district of the provincial-level municipality of Shanghai. Chongming consists of three low-lying inhabited alluvial islands at the mouth of the Yangtze north of the Shanghai peninsula: Chongming, Changxing, and Hengsha. Following its massive expansion in the 20th century, Chongming is now the 2nd-largest island administered by the People's Republic of China and the 3rd-largest in Greater China, after Hainan. Chongming does not, however, administer all of the island: owing to its continual expansion from sediment deposited by the Yangtze, it has merged with formerly separate islands and now includes Jiangsu province's pene-exclave townships of Haiyong and Qilong. Chongming proper covers an area of 1,411 km^{2} (545 sq mi) and had a population of 637,921 at the time of the Census 2020.

The county was established in 1396, the second year of the Ming dynasty's Hongwu Emperor. With the completion of the Yangtze and Chongqi Bridges, it is now connected to both the rest of Shanghai and southeastern Jiangsu province along the Hushan Expressway. Further development is now proceeding according to an urban and agricultural master-plan led by Philip Enquist of SOM, although ambitious plans for an ecocity named Dongtan have been shelved since the 2006 ouster of mayor Chen Liangyu and other neighborhoods have swelled with immigration from people relocated from central China following the completion of the Three Gorges Dam.

Chongming, Shanghai
- Chinese: 崇明
- Postal: Tsungming
Transcriptions
Standard Mandarin
- Hanyu Pinyin: Chóngmíng
Wu
- Romanization: Dzonmin

== History ==
Present-day Chongming first developed as two separate shoals—Xisha and Dongsha—during the Wude Era (AD 618–626) of the Tang dynasty. By the first year of Shenlong (705), a town was established on Xisha which was known as "Chongming". The number, size, and shapes of the islands fluctuated repeatedly over time and with the floods of the Yangtze River. In the 15th year of Jiading (1222) under the Southern Song, the islands were part of Tongzhou Prefecture. These early settlers were mostly fishermen and salt collectors, with its principal saltern at Tianci. In the 14th year of Zhiyuan (1277) under Kublai Khan of the Yuan, Chongming Prefecture was organized within Yangzhou. Owing to the shifting sands of the islands, however, the district seat needed to be repeatedly moved.

During the late Yuan and early Ming, the sparsely-inhabited shoals of the area began to fill with migrants from Pudong and other areas of Songjiang Prefecture. These immigrants introduced cotton cultivation, which spread widely prior to China's opening to international trade in the later Qing. There was small-scale textile production in the area, but most was exported for use in Songjiang, Hangzhou, and other more developed areas of Jiangnan. In the 2nd year of Hongwu (1396) under the Ming, the prefecture was elevated to a county but, shortly afterwards, a major subsidence provoked a mass emigration back to the mainland. This county was later placed in Suzhou and then Taicang Prefectures. The unification of over 30 shoals in 1681 was effectively the creation of the present-day Chongming, although it remained much smaller at the time.

Under the Republic, the county was organized first under the Nantong and then the Songjiang Special Administration District. Nine years after the establishment of the People's Republic of China, it was placed under the municipality of Shanghai in December 1958. Reclamation, particularly large-scale work on the island's northern and eastern tidal flats in the 1960s and '90s, doubled the size of Chongming between 1950 and 2010. Dongtan was a proposed ecocity which was planned to open along with the 2010 World Expo in Shanghai but stalled following the 2006 ouster of Shanghai mayor Chen Liangyu.

In mid-2016 Chongming was approved by the State Council of China to upgrade into a district of Shanghai; the District government was formally established in January 2017.

== Landmarks and tour ==
Dongping National Forest Park is located in the district, as are the Dongtan Nature Reserve, the Chongxi Wetland Park, and the Chongming National Geological Park. With its unspoiled environment, Chongming Island is one-of-a-kind destination great for eco-tours and restorative vacations. Chongming runs two 4A-class attractions and four 3A-class attractions. The tourism of the island focuses on three zones – East Chongming, Central Chongming and West Chongming. East Chongming features Dongtan Wetland Park and agritainment options in Yingdong Village and Nanjiang Village. Central Chongming features Dongping National Forest Park, agritainment options at Qianwei Village, Gaojia Zhuangyuan and Ruihua Orchard, Genbao Football Base, Chongming Xuegong (Chongming Museum), Jinaoshan Park, Shou'an Temple and Sanmin Cultural Village. West Chongming offers Mingzhu Lake Park, Xiling Resort, Xisha Wetland and agritainment at Lugang Village.

== Towns ==
The district government seat and largest settlement of Chongming is the town of Chengqiao on Chongming Island. There are 227 communities and villages in the district, administered as 16 towns and 2 townships.

Changxing Island is administered as a single town, also named Changxing. Other town-level divisions of Chongming include (from northwest to southeast): Xinhai, Lühua, Sanxing, Miao, Dongping, Gangxi, Jianshe, Xinhe, Shuxin, Gangyan, Bu, Xianghua, Zhongxing, Chenjia.

Hengsha Island is administered as a single township, also named Hengsha and Xincun. The other township-level division of Chongming are Qianwei Farm, Dongping Forestry Zone, and Shangshi Contemporary Agricultural Park.

To its southeast along the northern shore is the township of Haiyong; southeast of Haimen is Qilong. Both of these are pene-exclaves of Jiangsu; they are administered from Haimen District and Qidong, respectively.

| Name | Chinese (S) | Hanyu Pinyin | Shanghainese Romanization | Population (2010) | Area (km^{2}) |
|---|---|---|---|---|---|
| Chengqiao town | 城桥镇 | Chéngqiáo Zhèn | zen djio tzen | 113,442 | 58.00 |
| Bu town | 堡镇 | Bǔ Zhèn | phu tzen | 60,111 | 63.48 |
| Xinhe town | 新河镇 | Xīnhé Zhèn | sin wu tzen | 42,737 | 57.25 |
| Miao town | 庙镇 | Miào Zhèn | mio tzen | 45,926 | 95.70 |
| Shuxin town | 竖新镇 | Shùxīn Zhèn | zyu sin tzen | 40,823 | 60.00 |
| Xianghua town | 向化镇 | Xiànghuà Zhèn | xian hau tzen | 26,265 | 53.78 |
| Sanxing town | 三星镇 | Sānxīng Zhèn | se sin tzen | 29,894 | 68.70 |
| Gangyan town | 港沿镇 | Gǎngyán Zhèn | kaon yi tzen | 40,741 | 70.00 |
| Zhongxing town | 中兴镇 | Zhōngxìng Zhèn | tzon xin tzen | 25,274 | 45.54 |
| Chenjia town | 陈家镇 | Chénjiā Zhèn | dzen ka tzen | 53,996 | 94.90 |
| Lühua town | 绿华镇 | Lǜhuá Zhèn | loq rau tzen | 7,061 | 37.45 |
| Gangxi town | 港西镇 | Gǎngxī Zhèn | kaon sij tzen | 23,416 | 49.39 |
| Jianshe town | 建设镇 | Jiànshè Zhèn | ci seq tzen | 27,466 | 42.40 |
| Xinhai town | 新海镇 | Xīnhǎi Zhèn | sin he tzen | 11,646 | 105.04 |
| Dongping town | 东平镇 | Dōngpíng Zhèn | ton bin tzen | 15,112 | 119.70 |
| Changxing town | 长兴镇 | Chángxìng Zhèn | tzan xin tzen | 99,134 | 88.54 |
| Xincun Township | 新村乡 | Xīncūn Xiāng | sin tsen xian | 9,581 | 32.50 |
| Hengsha Township | 横沙乡 | Héngshā Xiāng | wan sau xian | 27,916 | 51.74 |
| Qianwei Farm | 前卫农场 | Qiánwèi Nóngchǎng | dzi we non dzan | 1,695 | 13.10 |
| Dongping Forestry Zone | 东平林场 | Dōngpíng Línchǎng | ton bin lin dzan | 35 | 3.55 |
| Shangshi Contemporary Agricultural Park | 上实现代农业园区 | Shàngshí Xiàndài Nóngyè Yuánqū | zaon dzeq yi de non gniq yeu chiu | 1,451 | 14.50 |

== Climate ==
Climate data for Chongming District, elevation 4 m (13 ft), (1991–2020 normals, extremes 1951–present)
| Month | Jan | Feb | Mar | Apr | May | Jun | Jul | Aug | Sep | Oct | Nov | Dec | Year |
|---|---|---|---|---|---|---|---|---|---|---|---|---|---|
| Record high °C (°F) | 22.3 (72.1) | 25.2 (77.4) | 31.9 (89.4) | 32.9 (91.2) | 35.4 (95.7) | 36.8 (98.2) | 39.9 (103.8) | 39.5 (103.1) | 36.9 (98.4) | 35.7 (96.3) | 29.0 (84.2) | 22.8 (73.0) | 39.9 (103.8) |
| Mean daily maximum °C (°F) | 7.9 (46.2) | 9.7 (49.5) | 13.9 (57.0) | 19.6 (67.3) | 24.7 (76.5) | 27.4 (81.3) | 31.7 (89.1) | 31.4 (88.5) | 27.6 (81.7) | 22.9 (73.2) | 17.3 (63.1) | 10.8 (51.4) | 20.4 (68.7) |
| Daily mean °C (°F) | 3.9 (39.0) | 5.5 (41.9) | 9.3 (48.7) | 14.7 (58.5) | 20.1 (68.2) | 23.7 (74.7) | 28.0 (82.4) | 27.7 (81.9) | 23.6 (74.5) | 18.3 (64.9) | 12.8 (55.0) | 6.4 (43.5) | 16.2 (61.1) |
| Mean daily minimum °C (°F) | 0.7 (33.3) | 2.0 (35.6) | 5.6 (42.1) | 10.6 (51.1) | 16.2 (61.2) | 20.9 (69.6) | 25.2 (77.4) | 25.0 (77.0) | 20.4 (68.7) | 14.4 (57.9) | 8.9 (48.0) | 2.8 (37.0) | 12.7 (54.9) |
| Record low °C (°F) | −9.8 (14.4) | −9.0 (15.8) | −4.7 (23.5) | −1.5 (29.3) | 5.0 (41.0) | 11.5 (52.7) | 15.6 (60.1) | 16.9 (62.4) | 10.0 (50.0) | 2.0 (35.6) | −4.0 (24.8) | −9.0 (15.8) | −9.8 (14.4) |
| Average precipitation mm (inches) | 62.8 (2.47) | 60.9 (2.40) | 80.7 (3.18) | 79.5 (3.13) | 83.5 (3.29) | 205.5 (8.09) | 147.8 (5.82) | 188.6 (7.43) | 110.1 (4.33) | 66.2 (2.61) | 58.2 (2.29) | 45.1 (1.78) | 1,188.9 (46.82) |
| Average precipitation days (≥ 0.1 mm) | 10.0 | 9.8 | 12.1 | 10.8 | 11.2 | 14.1 | 12.3 | 12.3 | 9.8 | 7.8 | 8.5 | 8.1 | 126.8 |
| Average snowy days | 2.3 | 1.8 | 0.6 | 0.1 | 0 | 0 | 0 | 0 | 0 | 0 | 0.1 | 0.8 | 5.7 |
| Average relative humidity (%) | 77 | 78 | 77 | 76 | 77 | 83 | 82 | 83 | 82 | 79 | 78 | 75 | 79 |
| Mean monthly sunshine hours | 121.5 | 123.6 | 150.5 | 173.3 | 186.5 | 138.8 | 200.1 | 209.4 | 173.3 | 168.7 | 138.3 | 137.5 | 1,921.5 |
| Percentage possible sunshine | 38 | 39 | 40 | 45 | 44 | 33 | 46 | 51 | 47 | 48 | 44 | 44 | 43 |
Source: China Meteorological Administration All-time September high

== Culture ==
Shadi dialect is spoken in the district.

== Transportation ==
Whereas the district was previously only connected to the mainland by ferry service, the Shanghai Yangtze River Tunnel now connects Changxing Island with Pudong in Shanghai, while the Shanghai Yangtze Bridge connects it with Chongming Island. Chongming is presently connected with Jiangsu by the Chongqi Bridge and these three bridges and tunnels form part of the Hushan Expressway connecting northern Shanghai with Xi'an in central China. The Chonghai Bridge connecting western Chongming with Haimen in Jiangsu is under construction.

Hengsha Island is connected via ferry. 18 ferries continue to operate in the district. On Chongming, Chengqiao's Nanmen Port offers service to Shidongkou and Baoyang Rd in Baoshan and to Liuhegang in southern Jiangsu; Xinhai's Niupeng Harbor to Qinglonggang in Haimen; and other ports offer connections with Wusong and the two other islands of the county.

The major arteries running along the length of Chongming Island are the Beiyan Highway on the north side and Chenhai Highway on the south. Another 38 highways cross the island. The main artery along the length of Changxing Island is the Panyuan Highway, while Fengle Road runs north and south across central Hengsha Island. There are 41 bus lines in Chongming, connecting over 98% of its 227 communities.

Chongming line of the Shanghai Metro will link Jinji Road station on Line 9 in Pudong to Chongming via Changxing Island. The first phase of the line from Jinji Road to Changxing Island is currently under construction.

== Sports ==
The Tour of Chongming Island International Cycling Race has been held on Chongming Island since 2007. It is held annually and includes a stage race and an UCI Women's Road World Cup race for elite women.

== Notable people ==
- Li Fengbao (1834–1887), Qing dynasty diplomat
- Gong Qiuxia (1918–2004), actress and singer
