= Anting West railway station =

Railway station in Shanghai

Anting West 安亭西站
- Station building

General information
- Location: Anting, Jiading District, Shanghai; China
- Coordinates: 31°18′49″N 121°09′03″E
- Lines: Beijing–Shanghai railway; Shanghai–Suzhou–Nantong railway
- Platforms: 2

History
- Opened: 1 July 2020
Location

Anting West station (Chinese: 安亭西站), formerly known as Anting station, is located in Anting, Jiading district, Shanghai, China. It is a station on the Beijing–Shanghai railway and the Shanghai–Suzhou–Nantong railway. The station was put into operation on 1 July 2020. It handles passenger services for some trains running via the Shanghai–Suzhou–Nantong railway. About 10 trains stop there every day. In the first month of operation, the average number of passengers arriving and departing each day was about 500. It is expected to become a major terminal station for non-high-speed trains.

== Summary ==
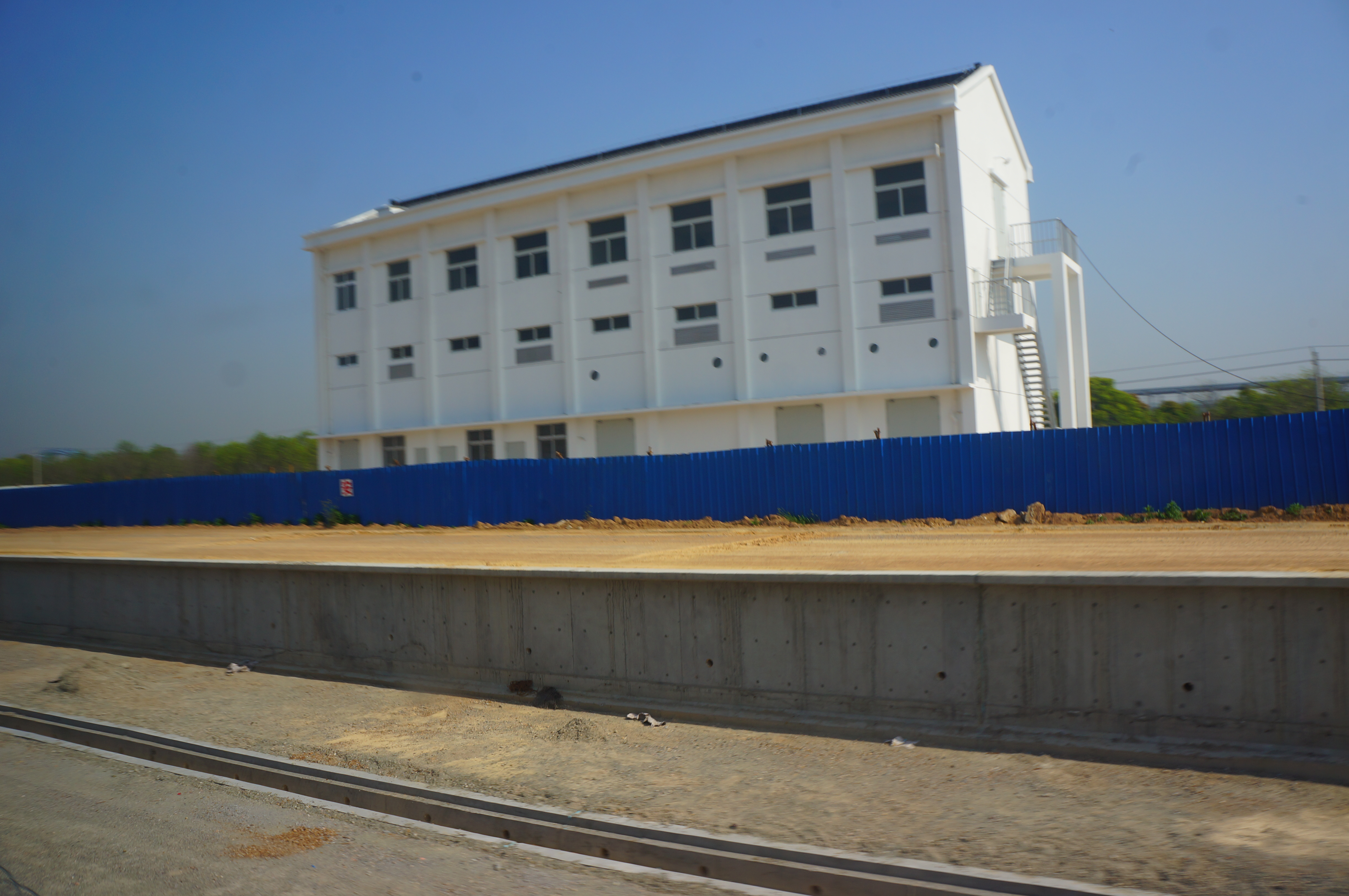
The station under construction (2017)

Construction of the station, as an intermediate station on the Shanghai-Nantong Railway, began in August 2014. At the end of 2014, it was confirmed that the station would handle passenger services in a report entitled "Adjustment of Relevant Projects of the Shanghai–Nantong Railway from Shanghai Boundary to Fengbang Section". However, due to issues such as land acquisition and property division along the line, as well as the fact that the construction section would affect the operation of the Beijing–Shanghai railway, the amount of work was greatly increased compared to the original proposal. During the construction of the station, the trains on the Beijing–Shanghai railway were limited to a speed of 45 km/h (28 mph) when passing through this section.

In order to carry out the sheet pile structure construction of the Shanghai–Suzhou–Nantong railway on both sides of the Beijing–Shanghai railway, the double-track bypass line of the Beijing–Shanghai railway was put into operation at Anting West station at the end of October 2016. The original Beijing–Shanghai railway was closed and the trains used the bypass line to pass through the station. In early June 2017, the up line was realigned; the down line was realigned on 6 July. After the realignment was completed, Anting station was closed, and only tracks 1 and 2 were opened to ensure the passage of trains in order to meet the access and renovation of the Shanghai–Suzhou–Nantong railway.

In January 2019, the railway department put out a tender for the construction of the Anting West station building. Construction of the building started in March 2019 and was scheduled to be completed in April 2020. In August 2019, the track laying inside Anting West station was completed, and it began to share the handling of some trains at the existing Anting station under construction. On 29 October, the prefabricated steel truss of the Anting West station passenger overpass was hoisted. The station construction was completed in May 2020.

On 1 July 2020, Anting West station was put into operation along with the opening of the Shanghai–Suzhou–Nantong railway.

== Station structure ==
=== Station building ===
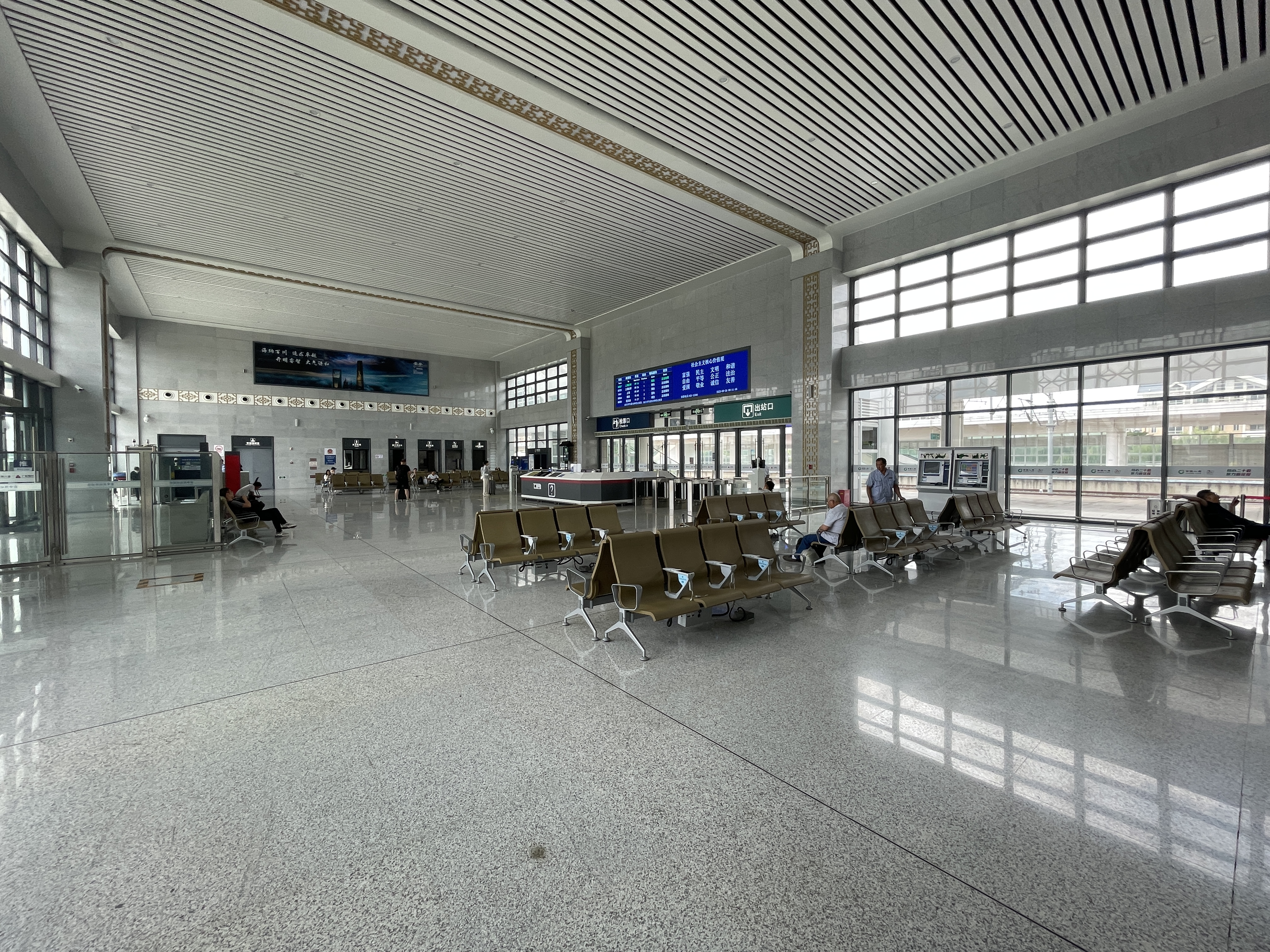
Interior

The station building of Anting West station has an area of 1992 square metres and a height of 12.5 m (41 ft). The exterior design of the station building is inspired by the gardens of Jiangnan. The roof is designed with the shape of a pavilion, which reflects the design theme of "traditional elegance". The main building of the station building has 1 floor, the annex has 2 floors and an underground floor. The entrance and exit hall on the first floor implements mixed flow of entrance and exit, and has 640 waiting seats. In addition, there are toilets, tea rooms, mother and baby rooms and other facilities. The station does not have a separate ticket office. All ticket services are handled by 3 automatic ticket vending machines and service counters located in the station building.

=== Station ===
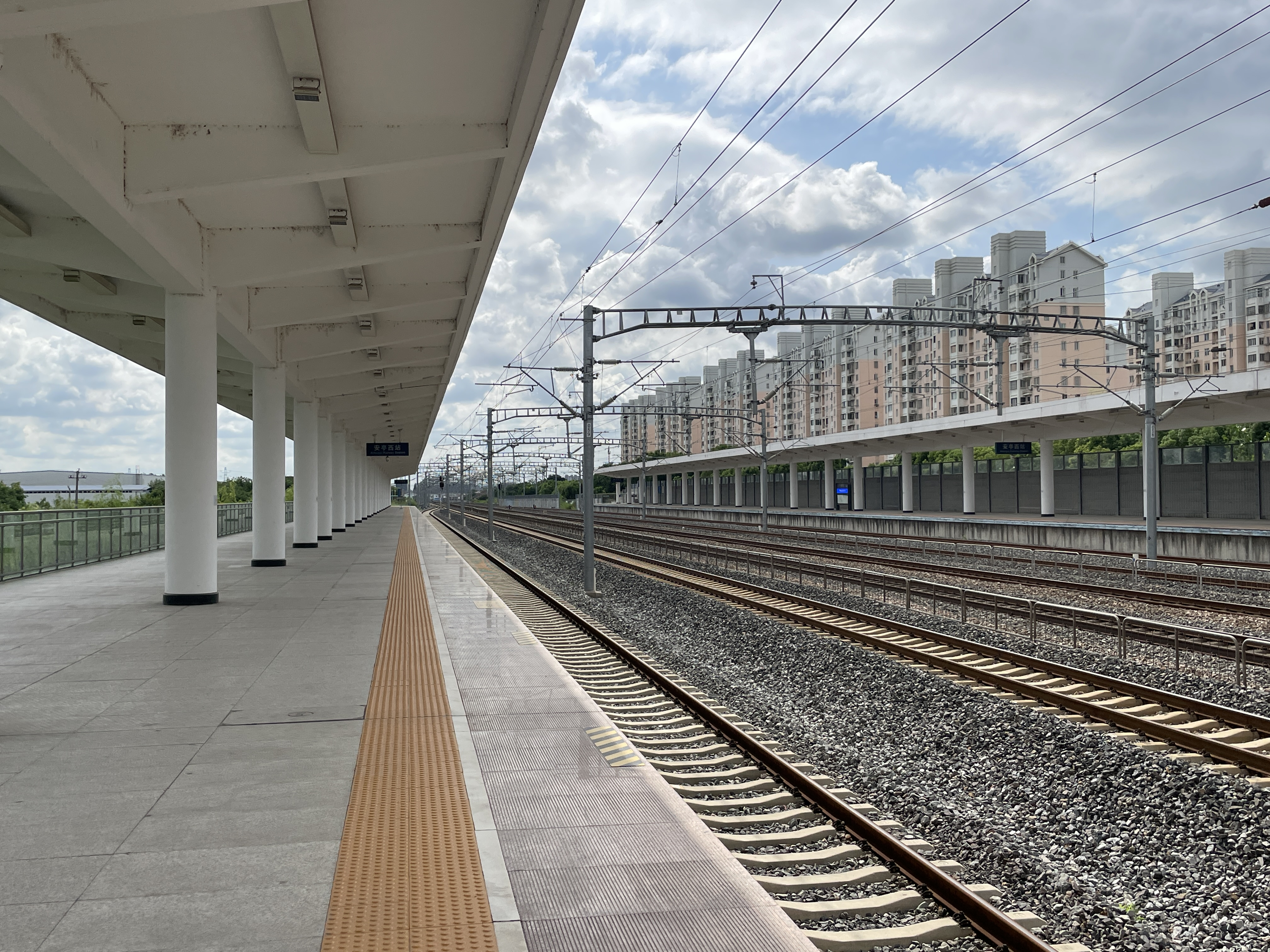
Platforms

Anting West Station has two platforms, No. 1 for the down line and No. 2 for the up line. Each platform is 550 m (1,800 ft)-long and 9 m (30 ft)-wide, with a canopy of 9,436 m^{2} (101,570 sq ft). The platforms and station building are connected by an overpass: the main structure of the overpass is 51.8 m (170 ft)-long, 9.45 m (31.0 ft)-wide, and 6.92 m (22.7 ft)-high, with an area of 1408 square metres and a structural weight of about 256 tons. Although the Beijing–Shanghai railway passes through the station, none of its services stop at the station.

== Future development ==
In the future, ordinary trains will be gradually relocated from Shanghai station and Shanghai station, which will transform into high-speed railway stations. The ordinary trains of Shanghai station are expected to be moved to this station, so it will continue to be expanded. After the expansion, Anting West station and Anting railway station will be integrated, with an ordinary through train area (i.e. the existing Anting West Station), ordinary train terminal area with a locomotive depot (dedicated to originating and terminating trains), urban train area (planned Baojia line and Jiaqingsongjin line of the Shanghai Suburban Railway) and high-speed area (i.e. the existing Anting North station). Metro Line 14 will also be extended to this area, and space for a line to Kunshan is reserved.
