= Shanghai Baoshan railway station =

Railway station in Shanghai

Shanghai Baoshan 上海宝山站

General information
- Location: Yangxing, Baoshan, Shanghai; China
- Coordinates: 31°24′17″N 121°26′29″E
- Lines: Shanghai–Nanjing–Hefei HSR (U/C); Shanghai–Suzhou–Nantong railway (U/C); Line 19 (Shanghai Metro) (U/C); Baojia Line (reserved)
- Platforms: 18

History
- Opened: Expected in July 2027
Location

Shanghai Baoshan (Chinese: 上海宝山站) station, also known as Shanghai North, is a station being built in Baoshan district, for the construction of the Shanghai–Nanjing–Hefei high-speed railway (also called the North Yangtze River HSR), the second phase of the Shanghai–Suzhou–Nantong railway and Shanghai Metro Line 19.

This station is the eastern starting point of the Shanghai–Nanjing–Hefei HSR, part of the Shanghai–Chongqing–Chengdu high-speed railway), and is equipped with an elevated terminal station with 4 island platforms and 8 tracks. The second phase of the Shanghai–Suzhou–Nantong railway passes through this station. Because the Huangpu River Tunnel, which passes under the mouth of Suzhou Creek (Wusongkou), is adjacent to the east side, its station is located on the second underground floor with a scale of 4 platforms and 10 tracks. A platform for the Shanghai–Suzhou–Nantong railway is reserved on the south side of the station. Shanghai Metro Line 19 runs through this station from north to south, and a platform is set on the third underground floor on the south side of the station. The station integrates municipal supporting projects and online development, creating a three-dimensional transportation hub with "four venues in one and a double-layer station".

On 9 January 2025, the bidding announcement for the station project (including the Line 19 station and reserved civil engineering for the metro line) was issued, with a planned construction period of 852 days. The three sections of the West, East and Middle East were respectively won by China Railway 24th Bureau, China Railway Construction-Shanghai Baoye Consortium and China Railway Shanghai Bureau. The project would start construction no later than 25 April 2026.

== Station structure ==
The total area of the project is about 482,400 m^{2} (5,193,000 sq ft), and the total building area of the station building is about 81,000 m^{2} (870,000 sq ft). The main body of the station building uses a hexagonal honeycomb structure as the design element, symbolising the precise arrangement of integrated circuits and echoing the strategic positioning of Baoshan District as a science and technology innovation centre.

The station square has a building area of approximately 390,000 m^{2} (4,200,000 sq ft), including hotels, offices and commercial services. The commercial area will be operated and managed by Hopson Development, with a total commercial area of approximately 115,000 m^{2} (1,240,000 sq ft).

This station connects to the Shanghai–Chongqing–Chengdu line, the Shanghai–Nantong line, Metro Line 19, and has a reserved space for a future light rail line. Above ground, a transportation hub serves as the core, linking national railways and urban transportation. Underground, a dual-track transfer hall is located, constructing multiple connecting paths from national railways to metro, suburban railways, and integrated development in front of the station.
