= Jinji Road station (Shanghai Metro) =

Shanghai Metro station

Jinji Road 金吉路
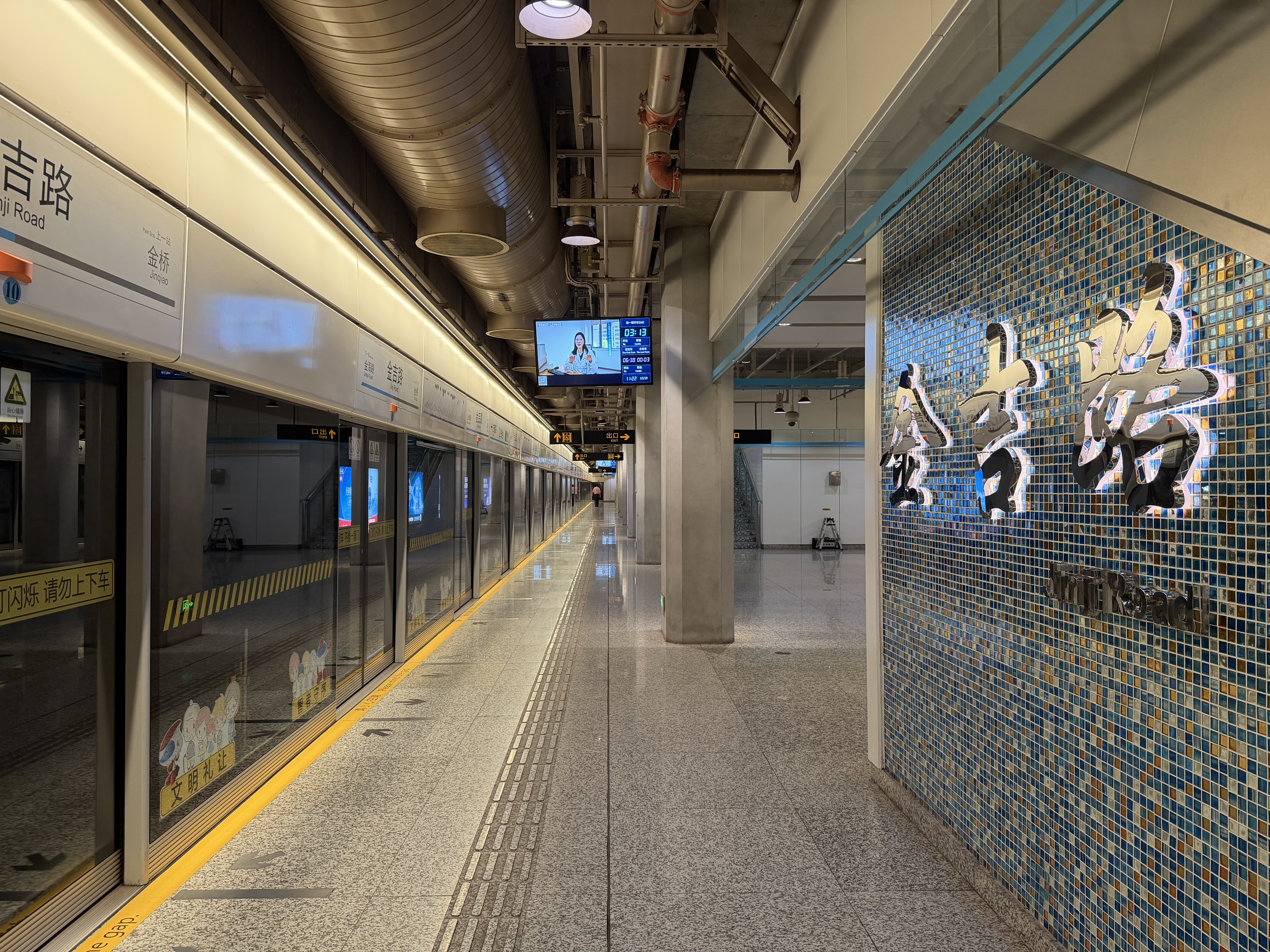
- Station platform

General information
- Location: Jinhai Road (金海路) and Jinji Road (金吉路); Pudong New Area, Shanghai; China
- Coordinates: 31.266499°N 121.624716°E
- Operator: Shanghai No. 1 Metro Operation Co. Ltd.
- Line: Line 9
- Platforms: 2 (1 island platform)
- Tracks: 2

Construction
- Structure type: Underground
- Accessible: Yes

History
- Opened: December 30, 2017

Services
Preceding station	Shanghai Metro	Following station
Jinqiao towards Shanghai Songjiang Railway Station	Line 9	Jinhai Road towards Caolu
Location
- Location within Shanghai

Jinji Road (Chinese: 金吉路; pinyin: Jīnjí Lù) is a station on Line 9 of the Shanghai Metro. The station is located at Jinhai Road and Jinji Road, between Jinqiao and Jinhai Road. It began passenger trial operation with the rest of phase 3 of Line 9, an easterly extension with 9 new stations, on December 30, 2017.

In the future, it is also expected to be the western terminus of Line 22, which is currently under construction and would run to Chongming District.
