= Dongping National Forest Park =

Forest park in Chongming Island, Shanghai

Coordinates: 31.6768°N 121.4815°E

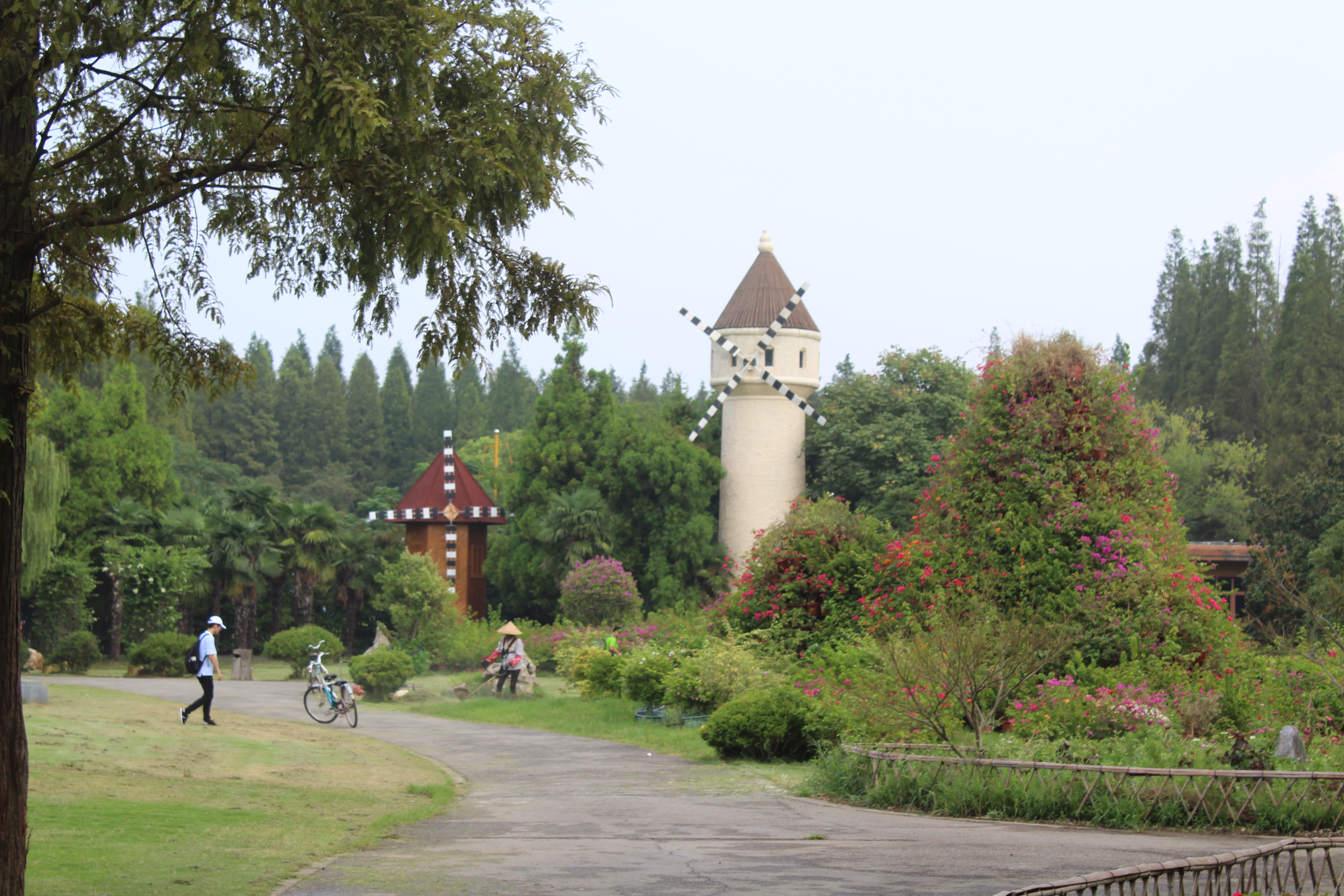
Dongping National Forest Park, September 2018

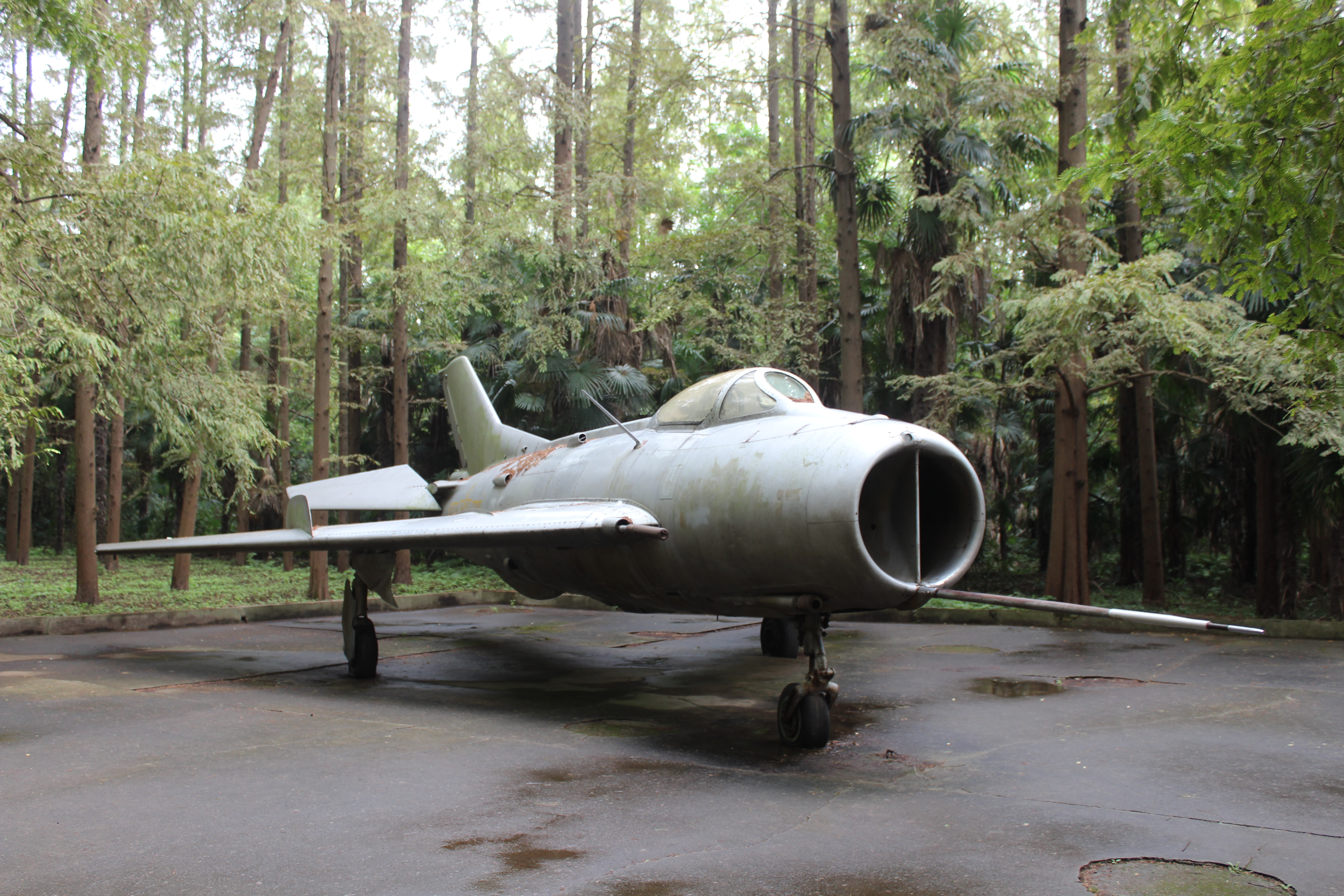
A Shenyang J-6 exposed near the entrance

Dongping National Forest Park (simplified Chinese: 东平国家森林公园; traditional Chinese: 東平國家森林公園; pinyin: Dōngpíng Guójiā Sēnlín Gōngyuán) is a forest park located on the north side of Chongming Island in Chongming District, Shanghai, China.

The park is 12 kilometres (7.5 mi) from Nanmen Port (the district government seat of Chongming District), which is connected to Jianshe on the southern side and neighboring Dongfeng Farm on the western and northern sides. At 1,700 metres (5,600 ft) long from east to west and 1,400 to 2,800 metres (4,600 to 9,200 ft) wide from south to north and covering an area of 3.55 square kilometres (1.37 sq mi), it is the largest man-planted forest in Eastern China and is also the biggest forest park in Shanghai.

== History ==
Dongping National Forest Park grew out of Dongping Forest Farm which was enclosed and founded in 1959. Since it was formally opened to the public in June 1989, it has attracted thousands of tourists every year. Top Chinese central leaders such as Jiang Zemin, Zhu Rongji, Yao Yilin and Chen Muhua have visited the park. Because of continual improvements to its scale and facilities, it was named Dongping National Forest Park by the Ministry of Chinese Forest Industry in June 1993 and evaluated as one of the ten new resorts in Shanghai at the beginning of 1997.
