= Jinqiao station =

Shanghai Metro station

Jinqiao 金桥
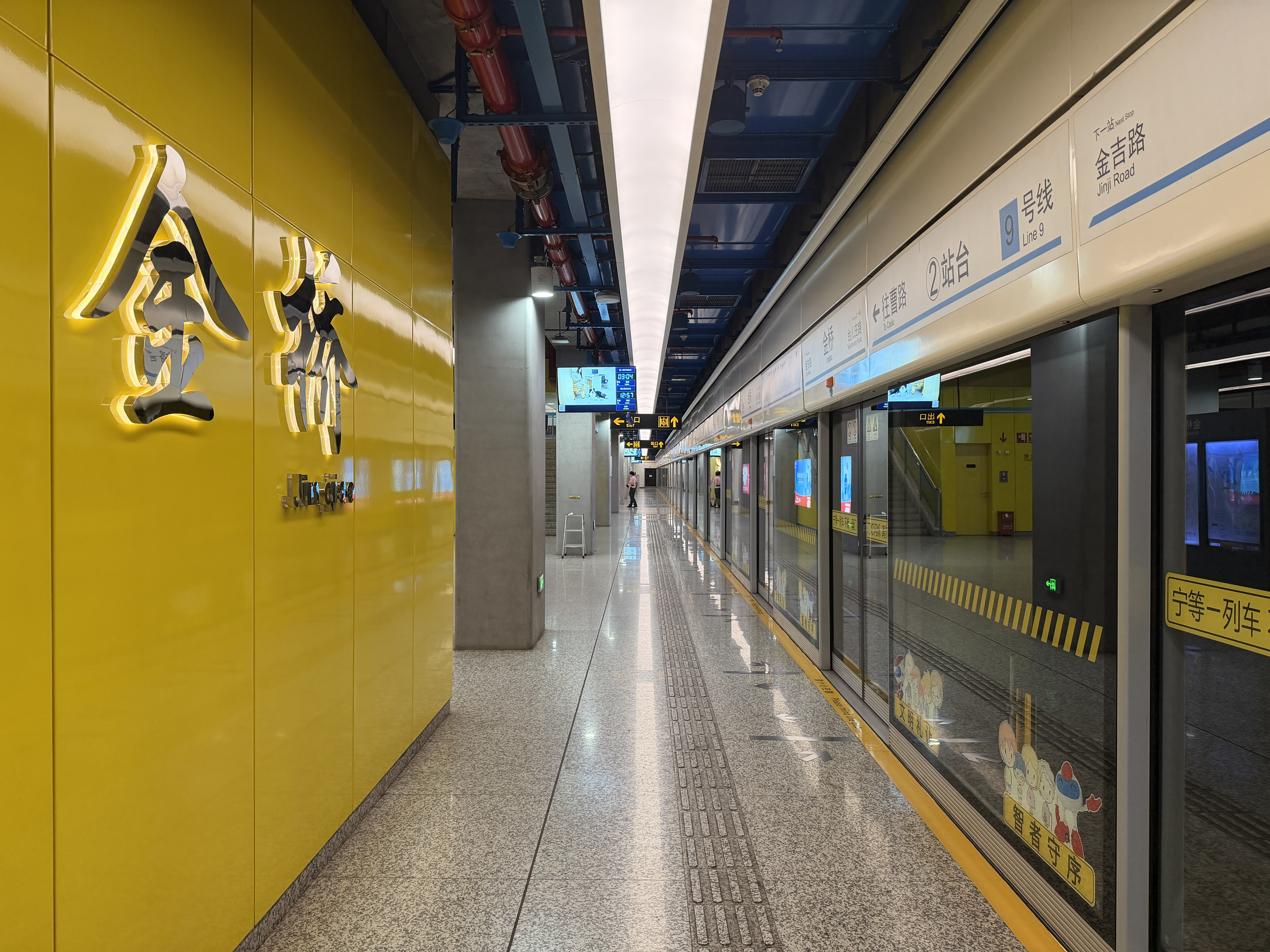
- Station platform

General information
- Location: Jinhai Road (金海路) and Donglu Highway (东陆路); Jinqiao, Pudong New Area, Shanghai; China
- Coordinates: 31.263056°N 121.606716°E
- Operator: Shanghai No. 1 Metro Operation Co. Ltd.
- Line: Line 9
- Platforms: 2 (1 island platform)
- Tracks: 2

Construction
- Structure type: Underground
- Accessible: Yes

History
- Opened: December 30, 2017

Services
Preceding station	Shanghai Metro	Following station
Taierzhuang Road towards Shanghai Songjiang Railway Station	Line 9	Jinji Road towards Caolu
Location
- Location within Shanghai

Jinqiao (simplified Chinese: 金桥; traditional Chinese: 金橋; pinyin: Jīnqiáo) is a station on Line 9 of the Shanghai Metro. The station is located in the town of Jinqiao in Shanghai's Pudong New Area, at the intersection of Jinhai Road at Donglu Highway, between Taierzhuang Road and Jinji Road. It began passenger trial operation with the rest of phase 3 of Line 9, an easterly extension with 9 new stations, on December 30, 2017.
