= Shanghai Industrial Holdings =

Shanghai Industrial Holdings Limited 上海實業控股有限公司
- Type: State-owned enterprise (Red chip)
- Industry: Conglomerate
- Founded: 1996; 30 years ago
- Headquarters: 26th Floor, Harcourt House, 39 Gloucester Road, Wanchai, Hong Kong
- Key people: Ms. Leng Wei Qing (Executive Director, Chairlady), Mr. Zhang Qian (Executive Director, CEO)
- Parent: Shanghai Industrial Investment (Holdings) Company Limited
- Website: https://www.sihl.com.hk/

Shanghai Industrial Holdings Limited ("SIHL", HKEX Stock Code: 363) was incorporated in Hong Kong in January 1996, and on 30 May of the same year was listed on the Stock Exchange of Hong Kong. SIHL is a constituent stock of the MSCI China All Shares Small Cap Index, Hang Seng Composite MidCap& SmallCap Index, Hang Seng Composite SmallCap Index, and an eligible stock of Shanghai-Hong Kong Stock Connect and Shenzhen-Hong Kong Connect.

Shanghai Industrial Holdings Limited, is the largest overseas conglomerate enterprise of Shanghai Industrial Investment (Holdings) Company Limited ("SIIC"). It serves as the flagship company of the SIIC group and focuses on investments in mainland China while operating from Shanghai and Hong Kong with international business activities.

As a conglomerate, SIHL has targeted three main industries: infrastructure and environmental protection (including toll roads, and environmental protection related business such as sewage treatment and solid waste treatment business), real estate and consumer products (including Nanyang Tobacco and Wing Fat Printing).
