= Line 22 (Shanghai Metro) =

Shanghai Metro line under construction

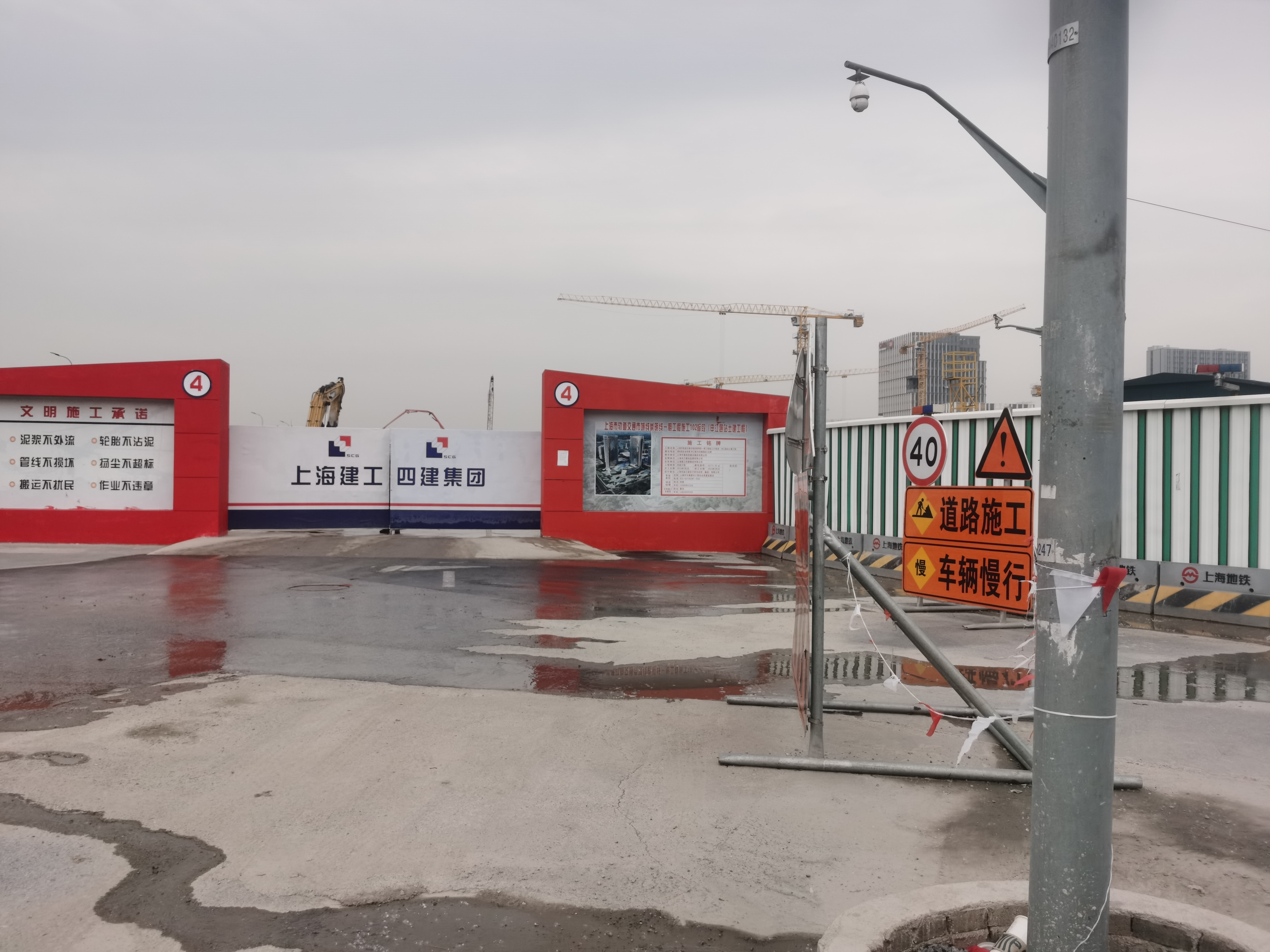
- Construction of Line 22 at Shenjiang Road in May 2023

Overview
- Other name(s): R4n (planned name); Line 19 (planned name up to 2016); Chongming Line (planned name between 2016 and 2024)
- Native name: 上海地铁22号线
- Status: Under construction
- Locale: Pudong, Chongming District; Shanghai
- Termini: Jinji Road; Yu'an
- Connecting lines: 9 12
- Stations: 8
- Website: www.shmetro.com

Service
- Type: Rapid transit
- System: Shanghai Metro
- Depot(s): Dongjing Road Depot; Chenjia Town Yard
- Rolling stock: Class A 6-car trains (Express train)

History
- Commenced: March 29, 2021; 5 years ago
- Planned opening: 2026

Technical
- Line length: 42.8 km (27 mi)
- Character: Underground (40.925km, 7 stations) and at-grade (2.078km, Yu'an)
- Track gauge: 1,435 mm (4 ft 8 1/2 in)
- Electrification: Overhead lines (1500 volts)
- Operating speed: 120 km/h (75 mph)

Line 22 of the Shanghai Metro, formerly named Chongming line (Chinese: 崇明线; pinyin: Chóngmíng xiàn) is a rapid transit line on the Shanghai Metro that is part of the 2018–2023 Shanghai Metro plan. The Chongming line was previously treated as the last phase of Line 9, and was Line 19 until 2016, when it was renamed the Chongming line. It would then be renamed as Line 22 in September 2024.

The Chongming line will start at Jinji Road in Pudong and end at Yu'an in Chongming District, and will interchange with Lines 9 and 12. It will be 42.8 kilometres (26.6 mi) long, including a 40.7-kilometre (25.3 mi) underground section.

The phase I construction is expected to be opened at the end of 2026. The phase I start at Jinji Road in Pudong and end at Changxing Island in Chongming District, is 22.4 kilometers long, all of which are underground, with 5 stations and 1 depot.

== History ==
Shanghai metro Chongming line opening history
Segment	Commenced	Opened	Length	Station(s)	Name	Investment
Jinji Road - Changxing Island	21 Mar 2021	exp 2026	20.6 km (12.8 mi)	5	Phase 1	32.82 billion yuan
Changxing Island - Yu'an	21 Mar 2021	exp 2026	22.2 km (13.8 mi)	3	Phase 2	32.82 billion yuan

== Planned stations ==
Station names according to an April 2019 planning document.

Station name		Connections	Distance km		Location
English	Chinese	Connections	Distance km		Location
Jinji Road	金吉路	9	0	0	Pudong
Shenjiang Road	申江路	12			Pudong
Gaobao Road	高宝路				Pudong
North Lingkong Road	凌空北路				Pudong
Changxing Island	长兴岛			20.6	Chongming
Chenjia Town	陈家镇				Chongming
Dongtan	东滩				Chongming
Yu'an	裕安			42.8	Chongming
