= Henrietta Colborne =

British cyclist (born 1998)

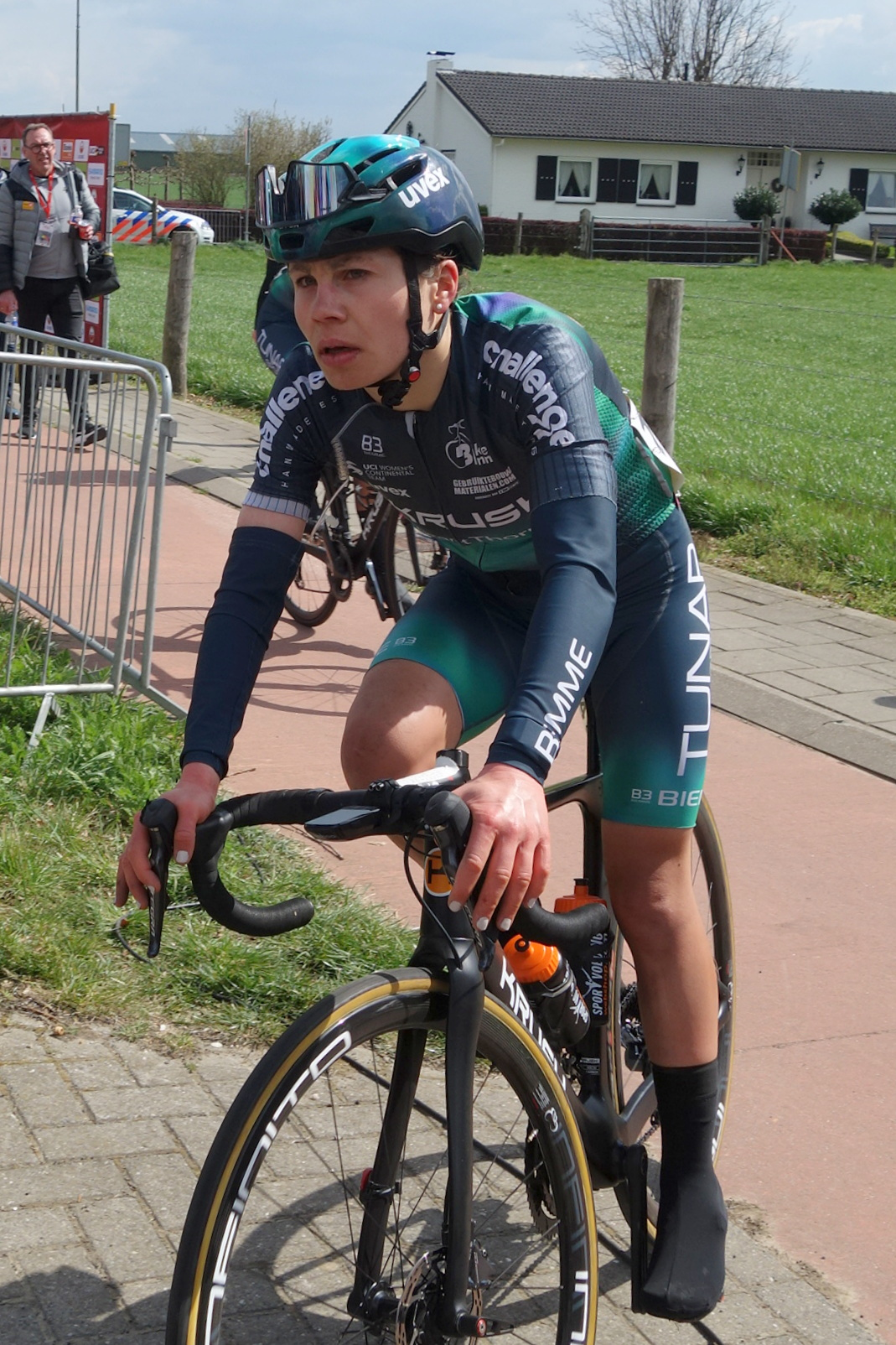
- Colborne at the 2022 Amstel Gold Race

Personal information
- Full name: Henrietta Tabitha Colborne
- Born: 20 April 1998 (age 28) Appleby-in-Westmorland, Cumbria, England

Cycling career
- Sport: Cycling
- Current team: XDS China Women's Team
- Discipline: Road
- Role: Rider

Amateur teams
- 2010: Border City Wheelers CC
- 2011–2013: Beacon Wheelers
- 2014: Bonito Squadra Corse
- 2015–2016: Jadan Cyclespace–Vive le Velo
- 2016: Team Ford EcoBoost
- 2017: Swaboladies.nl

Professional teams
- 2018: Bizkaia Durango–Euskadi Murias
- 2019–2024: Biehler Pro Cycling
- 2025: Velopro-EGS Group-Alpha Motorhomes
- 2026-: XDS China Women's Team

Henrietta Tabitha Colborne (born 20 April 1998) is an English professional racing cyclist, from Appleby-in-Westmorland, who currently rides for UCI Women's Continental Team XDS China Women's Team.

== Major results ==
2015
2nd Chrono des Nations Junior
8th London Nocturne
2016
4th Chrono des Nations Junior
7th Time trial, UEC European Junior Road Championships
2019
10th Flanders Ladies Classic
2021
6th Binche-Chimay-Binche pour Dames
2022
9th Overall Gracia–Orlová
2026
5th Grand Prix Oriente
