= Taicang railway station =

Railway station in Shanghai

Taicang 太仓站

General information
- Location: Liuhe, Taicang, Suzhou; China
- Coordinates: 31°30′50″N 121°11′32″E
- Lines: Shanghai–Nanjing–Hefei HSR (u/c); Shanghai–Nanjing Riverside HSR; Shanghai–Suzhou–Nantong railway
- Platforms: 7, 3 under construction

History
- Opened: 1 July 2020
Location

Taicang station (Chinese: 太仓站) is located in Liuhe, Taicang, Suzhou, China. It is a station on the Shanghai–Suzhou–Nantong railway, the Shanghai–Nanjing Riverside HSR and the Shanghai–Nanjing–Hefei HSR under construction. The station was opened to traffic on 1 July 2020, along with the Shanghai–Suzhou–Nantong railway, and is an important transportation hub in Taicang City.

As of the April 2025 timetable, Taicang Station handled a total of 68.5 pairs of scheduled passenger trains per day.

== History ==
The Shanghai–Suzhou–Nantong railway was the first railway opened in Taicang City. Construction of the Taicang section of the line began 14 October 2014. In March 2018, Taicang City launched the construction of Taicang Station building and the transportation system in front of the station, including the construction of facilities such as bus dispatch room, parking lot, taxi parking area, square and surrounding roads.

On 12 June 2018, China Railway Corporation and Jiangsu Provincial People's Government jointly approved the feasibility study report of the Shanghai–Nanjing Riverside HSR. The line will be introduced into the Taicang Station of the Shanghai–Suzhou–Nantong railway and will enter the Shanghai hub over the Shanghai–Suzhou–Nantong railway. Construction of the Taicang section of the Shanghai-Nanjing Yangtze River High-Speed Railway was launched on 9 May 2019.

In April 2020, the main structure of Taicang Station was completed and interior and exterior decoration work began. The work of paving the platform, access passages, and escalator installation is proceeding in an orderly manner. It was opened to traffic simultaneously with the Shanghai–Suzhou–Nantong railway on 1 July 2020.
