= Taizhou South railway station (Zhejiang) =

Railway station in Taizhou, Zhejiang, China

Coordinates: 28.5422°N 121.3189°E

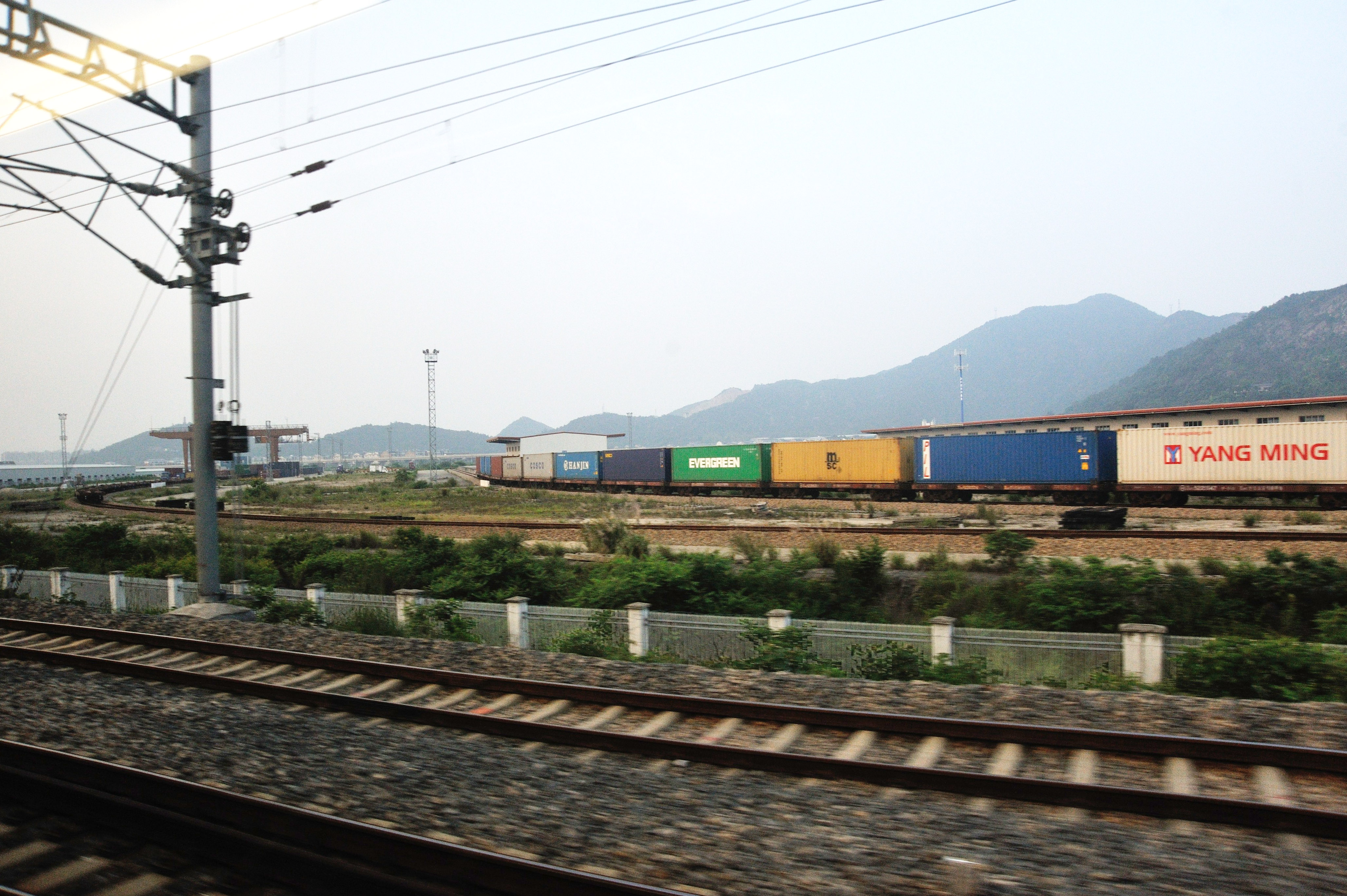
Taizhou South Railway Station Container Train

Taizhou South railway station is a freight-only railway station located in Luqiao District, Taizhou, Zhejiang, China. It was built with the Ningbo–Taizhou–Wenzhou railway which began passenger service in 2009, but Taizhou South was not used until 2011.

It is one of the eastern terminuses of the Jinhua–Taizhou railway.
