= Shanghai–Nanjing–Hefei high-speed railway =

Railway line in China

Overview
- Locale: China
- Termini: Hefei South; Shanghai Baoshan
- Stations: 16

Technical
- Line length: 554.6 km (344.6 mi)
- Number of tracks: 2
- Track gauge: 1,435 mm (4 ft 8 1/2 in) standard gauge
- Operating speed: 350 km/h (220 mph)

The Shanghai–Nanjing–Hefei high-speed railway (上海至南京至合肥高速铁路), also known as North Riverside high-speed railway (北沿江高铁), is a high-speed railway line currently under construction in China. The line is 554.6 kilometres (344.6 miles) long and has a design speed of 350 kilometres per hour (220 mph). It is part of Shanghai–Chongqing–Chengdu high-speed railway.

== History ==
Construction of Jiangsu Province section of the railway started on 28 September 2022. Construction of Anhui Province section of the railway started on 31 October 2022.

== Stations ==
| Station Name | Chinese | Metro transfers/connections |
|---|---|---|
| Hefei South | 合肥南 | 1 4 5 |
| Feidong | 肥东 | |
| Dashu | 大墅 | |
| Chuzhou | 滁州 | |
| Nanjing North | 南京北 | |
| Yizheng North | 仪征北 | |
| Yangzhou East | 扬州东 | |
| Taizhou South | 泰州南 | |
| Huangqiao | 黄桥 | |
| Rugao West | 如皋西 | |
| Nantong | 南通 | |
| Haimen North | 海门北 | |
| Qidong West | 启东西 | |
| Chongming | 崇明 | |
| Taicang | 太仓 | |
| Shanghai Baoshan | 上海宝山 | 19 (planned) |
