= Shanghai–Suzhou–Nantong railway =

Railway line in China

Husutong Railway
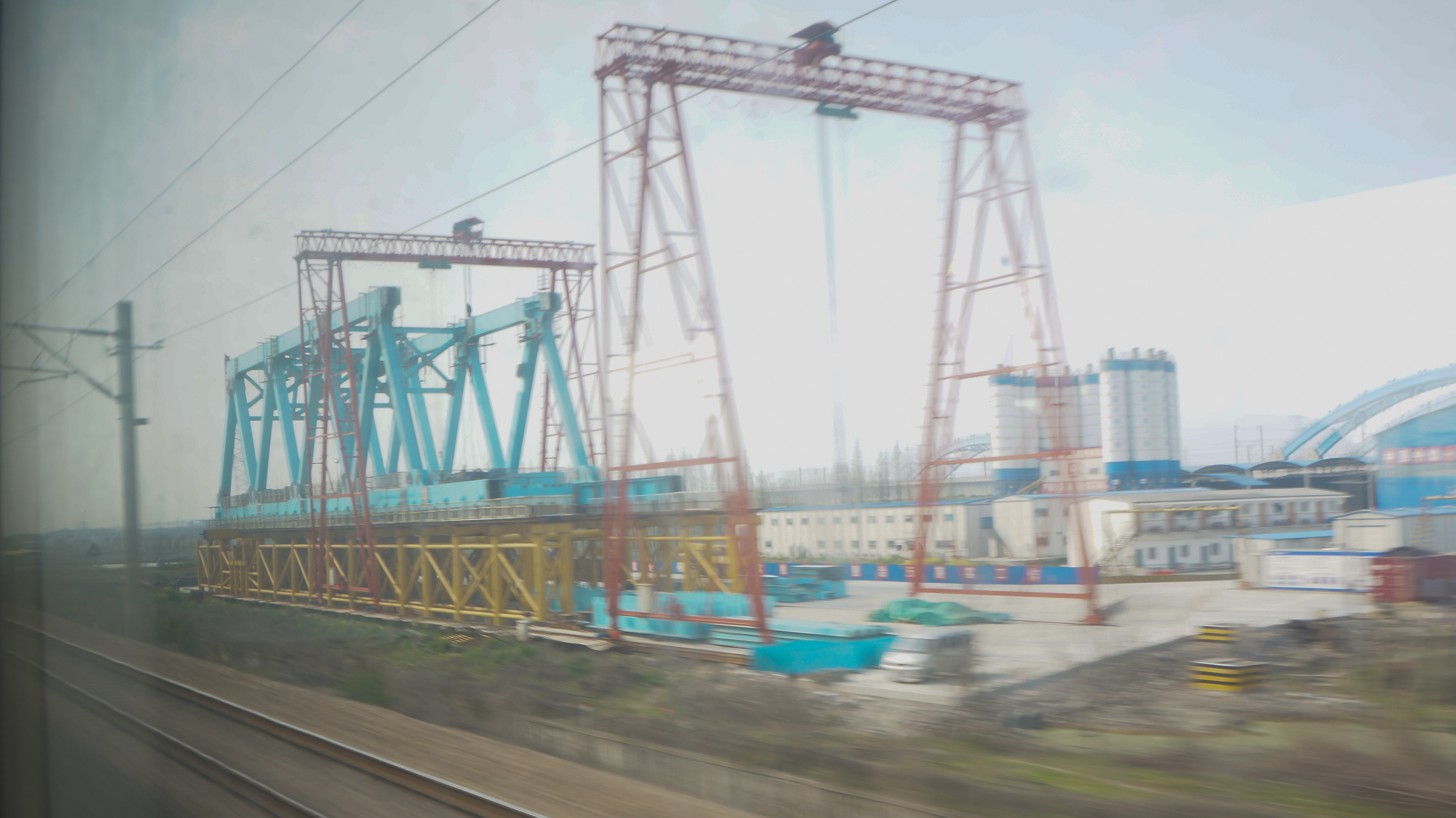
- Yangtze River Bridge on Husutong railway under construction, March 2016

Overview
- Native name: 沪苏通铁路
- Termini: Zhaodian; Huangdu
- Stations: 9

Service
- Type: Higher-speed rail Heavy rail

Technical
- Line length: 137.28 km (85.30 mi)
- Number of tracks: 2
- Track gauge: 1,435 mm (4 ft 8 1/2 in) standard gauge
- Operating speed: 200 km/h (120 mph)
- Signalling: Automatic block signaling
- Maximum incline: 0.6%

Shanghai–Suzhou–Nantong railway, abbreviated as Husutong railway (Chinese: 沪苏通铁路; pinyin: Hù-Sū-Tōng tiělù, "Hu", "Su" and "Tong" being the abbreviations for Shanghai, Suzhou and Nantong, respectively) is a higher-speed railway in China's Yangtze River Delta area, connecting Shanghai, the region's main city located south of the Yangtze, with Nantong in Jiangsu province, north of the river.

The railway is 143 kilometres (89 mi) in length and traverses several county-level cities in Suzhou Municipality of Jiangsu along the south bank of the Yangtze including Zhangjiagang, Changshu and Taicang. The railway is designed to accommodate maximum train speeds of 200 km/h (120 mph), the operation of electric traction hauled double-stack container trains and has reduced train travel time from Nantong to Shanghai to just over one hour.

== History ==
Initially proposed as the Shanghai–Nantong railway (Abbreviated as Hutong railway), construction works began on the first phase of the project in March 2014, and was expected to take five and a half years. The railway began operation on July 1, 2020.

The second phase of the railway, from Taicang to Situan, was approved in September 2021.

== Route ==
The railway includes 137 kilometres (85 mi) of new tracks, from Zhaodian railway station (赵甸站) on the Nanjing–Qidong railway northwest of downtown Nantong to Huangdu railway station on the Beijing–Shanghai railway, in the northwestern part of Shanghai City. Anting being within 20 km (12 mi) of Shanghai railway station, the total railway distance from Nantong to Shanghai is under 160 kilometres (100 mi).

The railway crosses the Yangtze River over the new Hutong Yangtze River Bridge between Nantong and Zhangjiagang, a double-deck bridge with a 4-track railway on the lower deck and a six-lane roadway on the upper deck. The bridge is the world's longest span (1,092 metres (3,583 ft)) cable-stayed road-rail bridge with the highest (325 metres (1,066 ft)) piers of a cable-stayed road-rail bridge. The bridge is the easternmost railway crossing of the Yangtze. Previously, the only railway crossing in the Yangtze Delta region was a freight-only rail ferry on the Xinyi–Changxing railway, between Jingjiang and Jiangyin, some 30 kilometres (19 mi) upstream. The closest railway bridge is the Nanjing Yangtze River Bridge, over 200 kilometres (120 mi) upstream. The new bridge thus greatly improves the railway connections between the Central Jiangsu (the region north of the Yangtze) and the Jiangnan, in particular Shanghai.

On its way between the new bridge and Anting, the railway has brought rail service for the first time to prosperous communities on the southern bank of the Yangtze such as Zhangjiagang, Changshu, and Taicang which had no railway connection.

== Railway Stations ==
Station	Chinese	Distance (km)	County-level city / District	Prefecture-level city	Province	Metro transfers
Nantong	南通站	(13)	Chongchuan	Nantong	Jiangsu	
Zhaodian	赵甸站	0	Tongzhou	Nantong	Jiangsu	
Nantong West	南通西站	6	Tongzhou	Nantong	Jiangsu	
Zhangjiagang North	张家港北站	32	Zhangjiagang	Suzhou	Jiangsu	
Zhangjiagang	张家港站	34	Zhangjiagang	Suzhou	Jiangsu	
Changshu	常熟站	52	Changshu	Suzhou	Jiangsu	
Taicanggang (freight station)	太仓港站		Taicang	Suzhou	Jiangsu	
Taicang	太仓站	100	Taicang	Suzhou	Jiangsu	
Taicang South	太仓南站	114	Taicang	Suzhou	Jiangsu	
Anting West	安亭西站	129	Jiading	Shanghai	Shanghai	
Huangdu	黄渡站		Jiading	Shanghai	Shanghai	
Xuhang (branch)	徐行站		Jiading	Shanghai	Shanghai	
Shanghai Baoshan (branch)	上海宝山站		Baoshan	Shanghai	Shanghai	
Waigaoqiao (freight station, branch)	外高桥站		Pudong	Shanghai	Shanghai	
Caolu (branch)	曹路站		Pudong	Shanghai	Shanghai	
Shanghai East (branch)	上海东站		Pudong	Shanghai	Shanghai	
Situan (branch)	四团站		Pudong	Shanghai	Shanghai	
