= Shanghai–Nanjing Riverside high-speed railway =

Railway line in China

Overview
- Locale: Jiangsu, China
- Termini: Nanjing South; Taicang
- Stations: 8

Service
- Operator(s): China Railway Shanghai Group

History
- Opened: 28 September 2023

Technical
- Line length: 278.53 km (173.07 mi)
- Number of tracks: 2
- Operating speed: 350 km/h (220 mph)

The Shanghai–Nanjing Riverside high-speed railway (Chinese: 沪宁沿江高速铁路; pinyin: Hù–Níng Yánjiāng Gāosù Tiělù) is a high-speed railway line in Jiangsu, China. The line is 278.53 kilometres (173.1 miles) long and has a design speed of 350 kilometres per hour (220 mph). It was opened for operation on 28 September 2023.

== History ==
Installation of the rails began on 1 September 2022.

Operating started on 28 September 2023.

== Route ==
Between Nanjing South and Jiangning, the line runs parallel to the Nanjing–Hangzhou high-speed railway. Between Zhangjiagang and Taicang, the line runs parallel to the Shanghai–Suzhou–Nantong railway. After Taicang, trains on the Riverside HSR utilized the existing Shanghai–Suzhou–Nantong railway to enter Shanghai.

=== Stations ===
Station Name	Chinese	Metro transfers/connections	Location
Nanjing South	南京南	1 3 S1 S3	Nanjing
Jurong	句容	S6	Zhenjiang
Jintan	金坛		Changzhou
Wujin	武进	1	Changzhou
Jiangyin	江阴		Wuxi
Zhangjiagang	张家港		Suzhou
Changshu	常熟		Suzhou
Taicang	太仓		Suzhou
