= Higher-speed rail =

Type of railway with speeds approaching but less than that of true high-speed rail

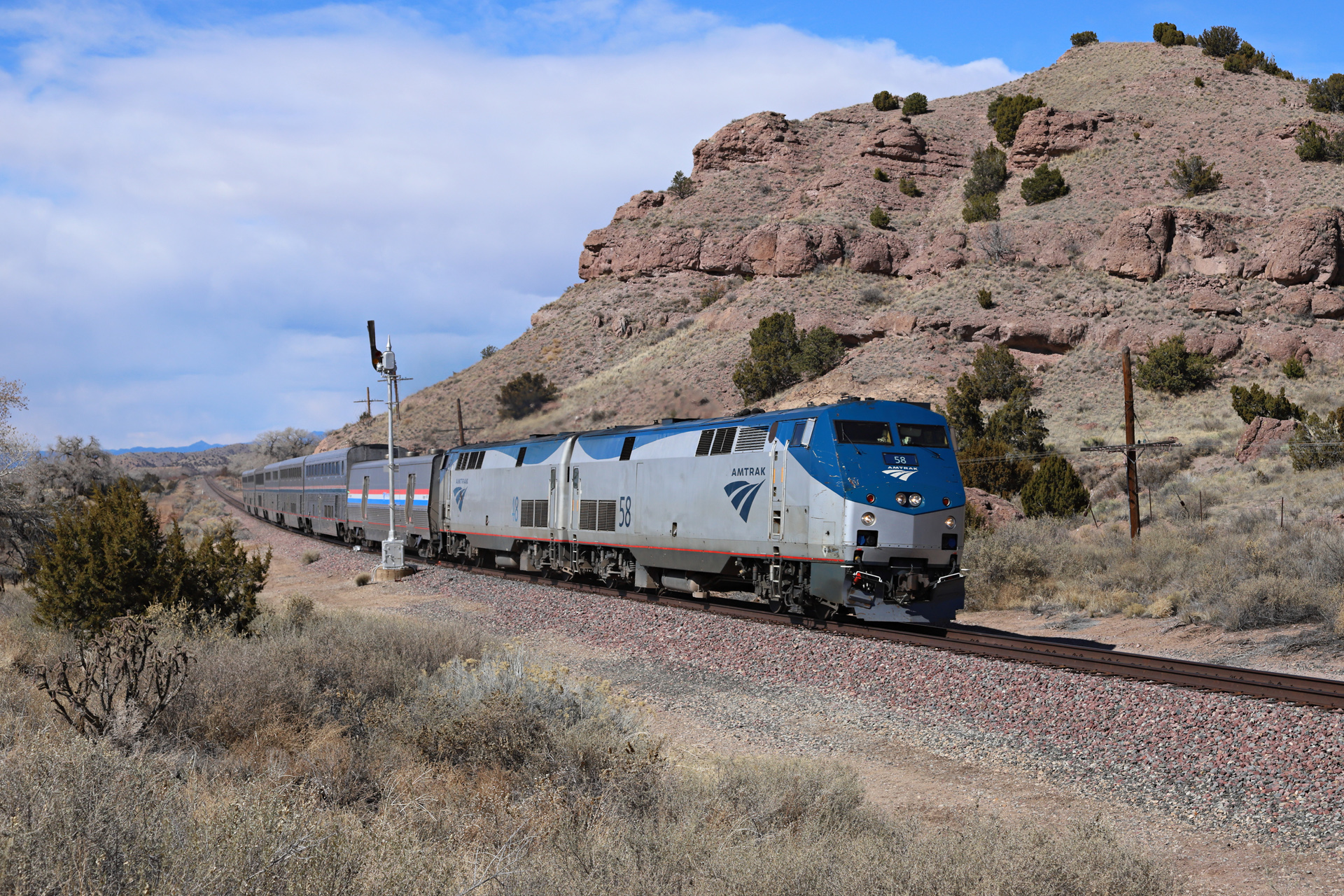
Amtrak's eastbound Southwest Chief passing a signal east of Los Cerrillos, New Mexico.

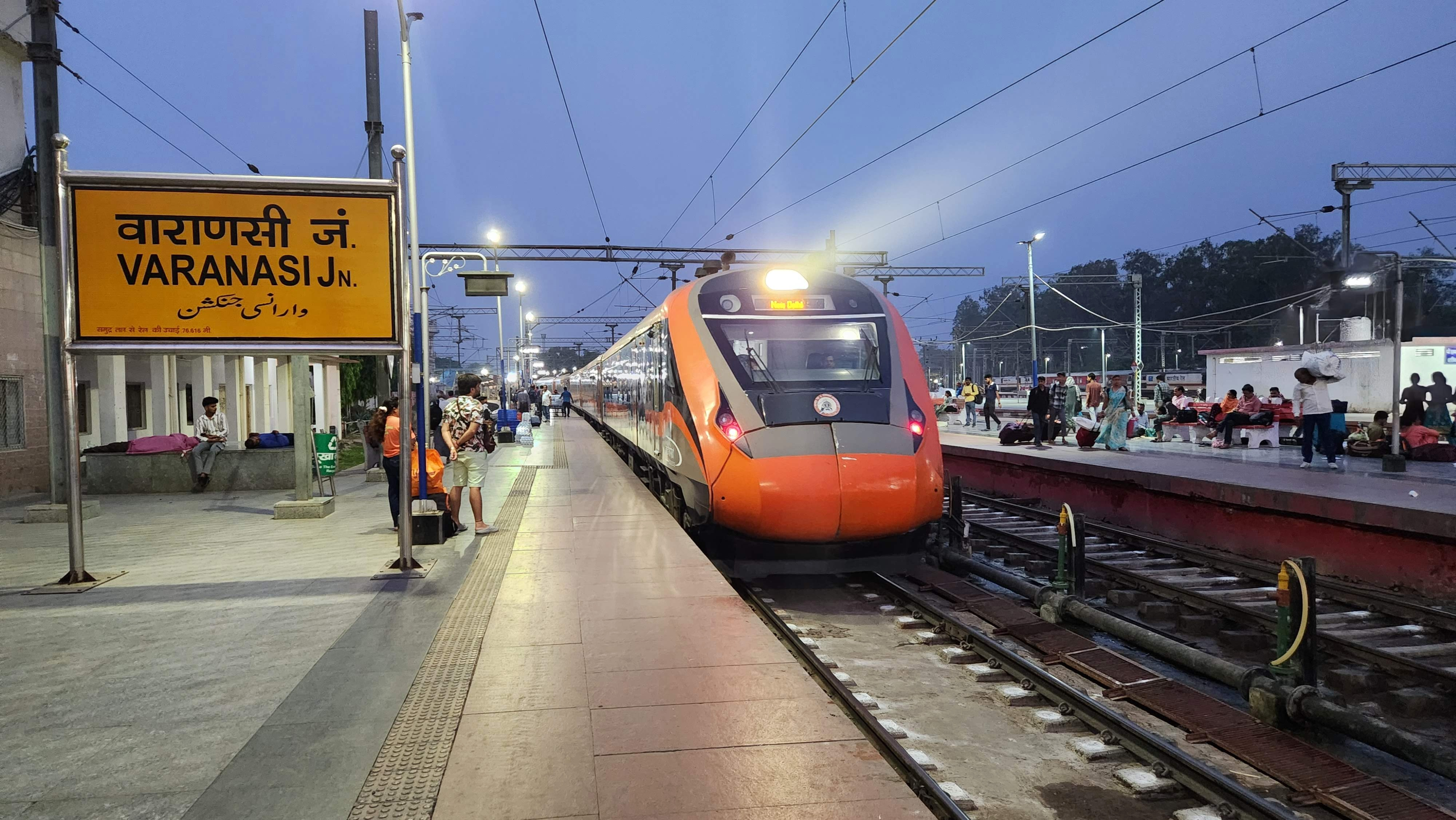
Indian Railways' 3rd generation Vande Bharat trainset of the New Delhi – Varanasi Vande Bharat Express ready for departure at Varanasi Junction, Uttar Pradesh.

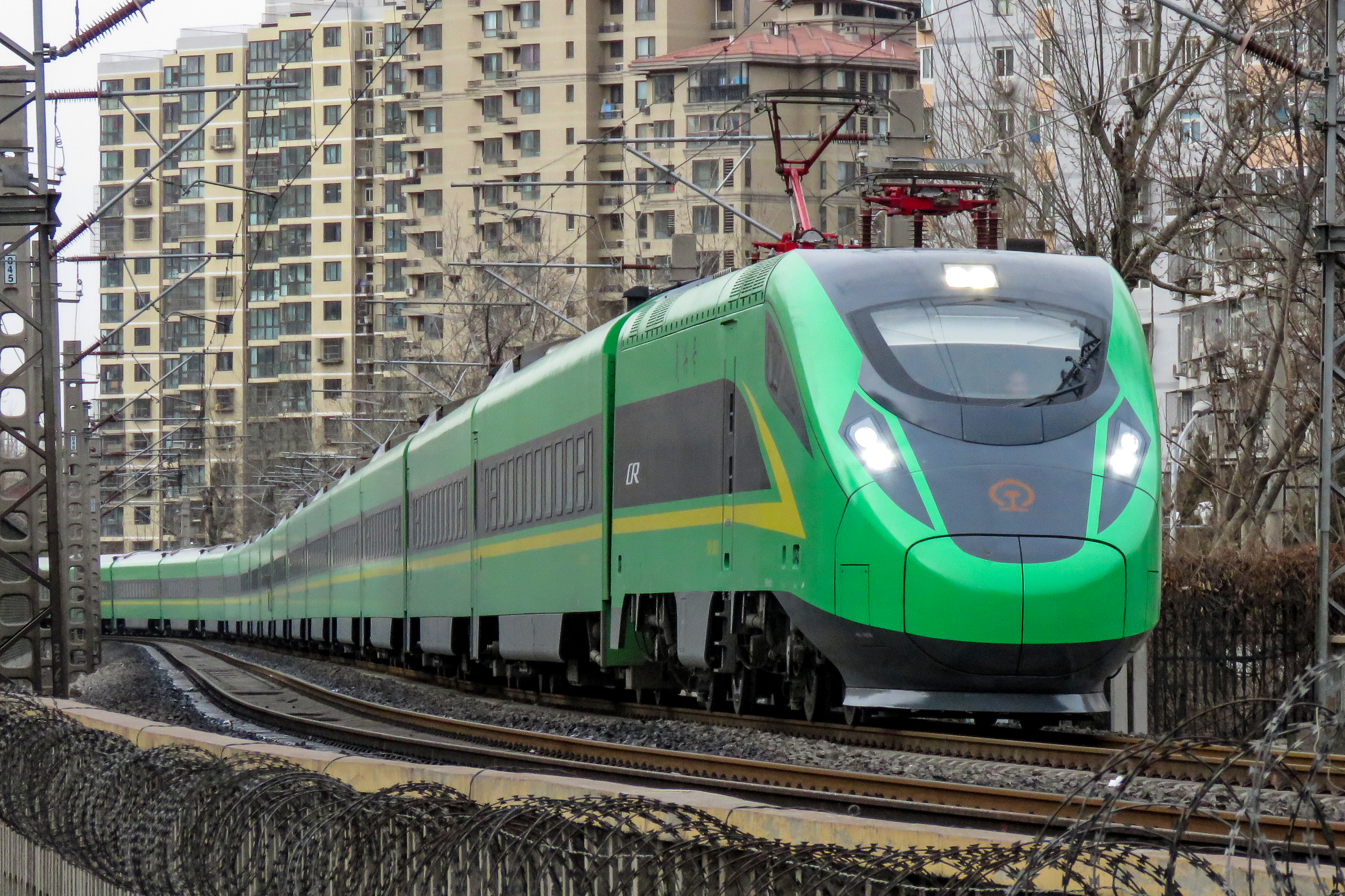
China Railway's CR200J power car FXD1-J0010 on the Beijing–Shanghai railway passing through Guangqumen, Beijing.

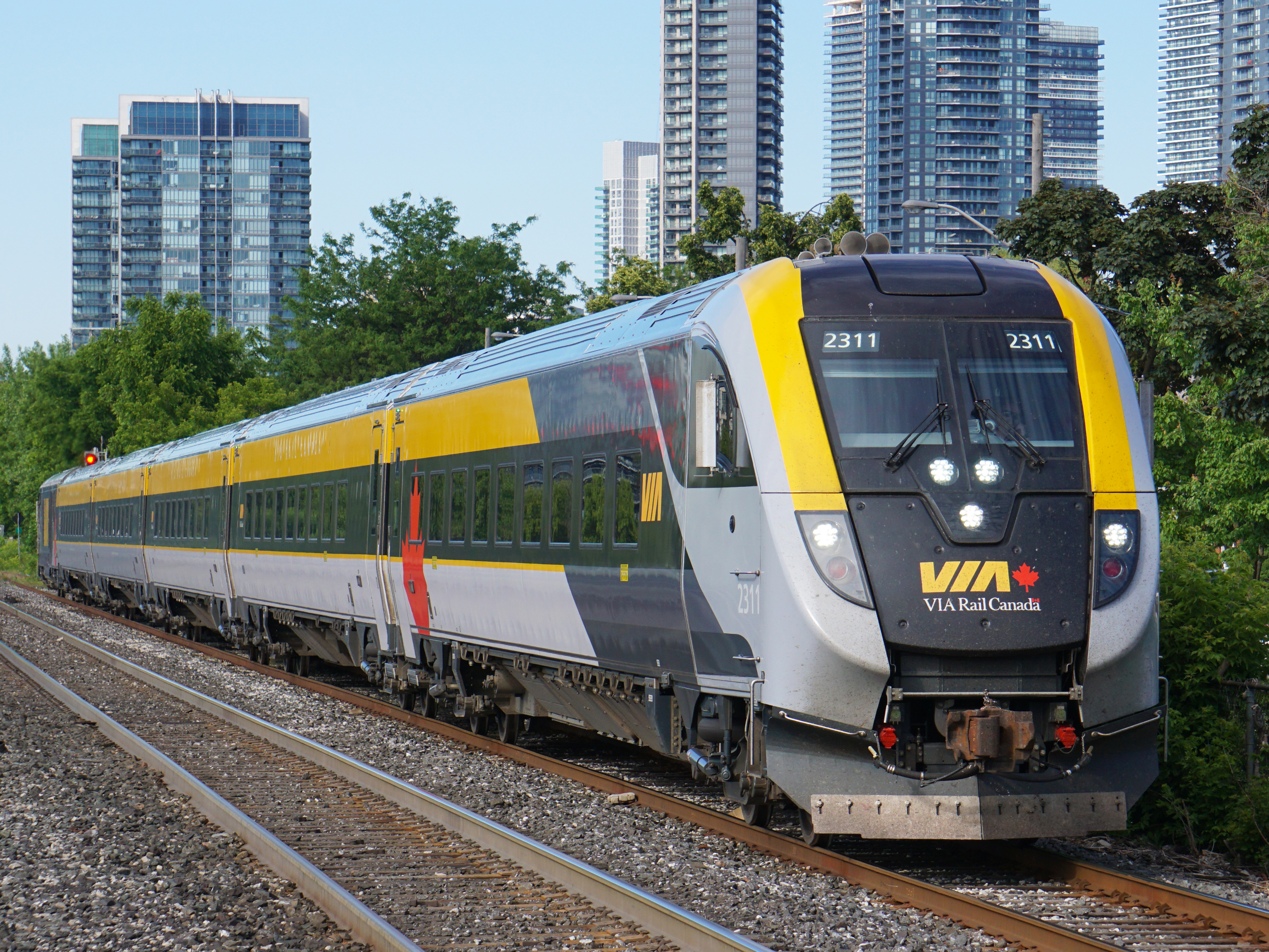
Via Rail's Siemens Venture cab car 2311 on a Corridor service entering the Toronto Maintenance Centre east of Toronto, Ontario.

Higher-speed rail (HrSR) (Note: Also known as high-performance rail, higher-performance rail, semi-high-speed rail, or almost-high-speed rail.) is used to describe inter-city passenger rail services that have top speeds higher than conventional rail but not fast enough to be called high-speed rail services. The term is also used by planners to identify the incremental rail improvements to increase train speeds and reduce travel time as alternatives to larger efforts to create or expand the high-speed rail networks.

Though the definition of higher-speed rail varies from country to country, most countries use the term to refer to rail services operating at speeds of up to 200 km/h (125 mph).

The concept is usually viewed as stemming from efforts to upgrade a legacy railway line to high speed railway standards (speeds in excess of 250 km/h or 155 mph), but usually falling short on the intended speeds. The faster speeds are achieved through various means including new rolling stock such as tilting trains, upgrades to tracks including shallower curves, electrification, in-cab signalling, and less frequent halts/stops.

== Definitions by country ==
As with the definitions of high-speed rail, the definition varies by country. The term has been used by government agencies, government officials, transportation planners, academia, the rail industry, and the media, but sometimes with overlaps in the speed definitions. Some countries with an established definition of higher-speed rail include:

- In Canada, according to the Surface Transportation Policy, Department of Transport, the speed range for higher-speed rail is between 160 and 240 km/h (100 and 150 mph).
- In India, according to the Ministry of Railways, the speed range for India's higher-speed rail will be between 160 and 200 km/h (100 and 125 mph).
- In the United Kingdom, the term higher-speed rail is used for upgraded tracks with train speeds up to 125 mph (200 km/h)
- In the United States, the term "higher-speed rail", as opposed to "high-speed rail", is used by regional planners in many U.S. states to describe inter-city passenger rail services with top speeds of between 90 mph (145 km/h) and 110 mph (175 km/h). This is the equivalent of the definition of "Emerging High-Speed Rail" as defined by the Federal Railroad Administration. The Congressional Research Service defines rail services on dedicated tracks with speeds over 150 mph (240 km/h) as "Very High Speed Rail".
  State-level departments of transportation and council of governments may use different definitions. Below is the list of known definitions of higher-speed rail which use some of the 5 speed levels, 80 mph (130 km/h), 90 mph (145 km/h), 110 mph (175 km/h), 125 mph (200 km/h) and 150 mph (240 km/h):

Agency / Council	Top speeds (mph)	Ref
California Department of Transportation	Up to 125	
Minnesota Department of Transportation	Greater than 90 but less than 125	
North Central Texas Council of Governments	80–150	
Oklahoma Department of Transportation	110–125	
Texas Department of Transportation	110–125	
Virginia Department of Rail and Public Transportation	Up to 110	

== Speed limits ==
In Canada, the assumption about grade crossing is that operating higher-speed rail services between 160 and 200 km/h (99 and 124 mph) would require "improved levels of protection in acceptable areas".

In the United States, railroad tracks are largely used for freight with at-grade crossings. Passenger trains in many corridors run on shared tracks with freight trains. Most trains are limited to top speeds of 79 mph (127 km/h) unless they are equipped with an automatic cab signal, automatic train stop, automatic train control or positive train control system approved by the Federal Railroad Administration (FRA). In developing higher-speed rail services, one of those safety systems must be used.

Additionally, the FRA establishes classification of track quality which regulates the speed limits of trains with Class 5, Class 6, Class 7 and Class 8 for top speeds of 90 mph (145 km/h), 110 mph (175 km/h), 125 mph (200 km/h) and 160 mph (255 km/h), respectively. The FRA also regulates passenger train design and safety standards to ensure trains that operate at speeds of 80 mph (130 km/h) up to 125 mph (200 km/h) comply with its Tier I standard and trains that operate at speeds up to 150 mph (240 km/h) comply with its Tier II standard.

Another limitation is the safety of grade crossings (also known as level crossings, flat level crossings, non-grade-separated crossings) which limits how fast trains can go. FRA regulations set speed limits for tracks with grade crossings as follows: Level crossings are generally the most dangerous part of the railway network with a large number of fatal incidents occurring at a grade crossing.

- For 110 mph (175 km/h) or less: Grade crossings are permitted. States and railroads cooperate to determine the needed warning devices, including passive crossbucks, flashing lights, two quadrant gates (close only 'entering' lanes of road), long gate arms, median barriers, and various combinations. Lights and/or gates are activated by circuits wired to the track (track circuits).
- For 110 to 125 mph (175 to 200 km/h): The FRA permits crossings only if an "impenetrable barrier" blocks highway traffic when a train approaches.
- Above 125 mph (200 km/h): No crossings will be permitted.

In Europe, the limit is often 160 km/h (100 mph) over grade crossings. In Sweden there is a special rule permitting 200 km/h (125 mph) if there are barriers and automatic detection of road vehicles standing on the track. In Russia 250 km/h (155 mph) is permitted over grade crossings. The United Kingdom has railway lines of 200 km/h (125 mph) which still use grade crossings.

With the above limitations, many regional transportation planners focus on rail improvements to have the top speeds up to 110 mph (175 km/h) when proposing a new higher-speed rail service.

== Similar categories ==
In countries where there had been rail improvement projects in the later part of the 20th century and into the 2000s, there are inter-city rail services with comparable speed ranges of higher-speed rail, but they are not specifically called "higher-speed rail". Below are some examples of such services that are still in operation.

- Canada: The Quebec City–Windsor Corridor that runs between Quebec City and Windsor allows Via Rail trains to run at speeds of 100 km/h (60 mph), about 130 km/h (80 mph) today.
- Europe: The InterCity services in many European countries have top speeds of mostly up to 160 km/h (100 mph), but they can go up to 200 km/h (125 mph). Intercity trains that cross international borders are usually designated as EuroCity and reach similar speeds where tracks allow it. High speed trains also may use upgraded and electrified lines that are not purpose-built during part of their journey at up to 220 km/h (135 mph).
- Japan: The Mini-shinkansen lines in Japan are the conventional lines that have been converted from narrow gauge to standard gauge to allow Shinkansen trains to pass through with top speeds of 130 km/h (80 mph). However, the International Union of Railways recognizes the Mini-shinkansen lines as high-speed rail. Two Mini-shinkansen lines have been constructed: the Yamagata Shinkansen and Akita Shinkansen. Both of these lines branch off from the high-speed Tohoku Shinkansen line with top speeds of 320 km/h (200 mph).
- Spain: Many inter-city rail services operated by Renfe Operadora, the state-owned company, are not classified as high-speed rail. Those services are Alaris, Altaria, Arco and Talgo (from Talgo III to Talgo VII) with top speeds of 160 and 200 km/h (100 and 125 mph)
- In Norway, there is sometimes talked about høy hastighet, which may be compared to higher-speed rail as used here – and høyhastighet, high-speed rail. Most of the rail network is old, with sharp curves, and speeds at only 70–130 km/h (45–80 mph). The lines around Oslo are upgraded or renewed, or are planned to be so. Some of the sections, like Follobanen (Oslo–Ski, 22 km), are built or planned for 250 km/h (155 mph) – though others to høy hastighet, i.e. 160 km/h (100 mph) or 200 km/h (125 mph). By the same token, the Norwegian FLIRT trains and the El 18 locomotives have a top speed of 200 km/h. Gardermobanen is called a high-speed line, and the GMB Class 71 and NSB Class 73 are often called high-speed trains – with 210 km/h (130 mph) top speed. However, the limits are blurry. Sometimes, e.g. the FLIRTs are called high-speed trains.
- Sweden: SJ (Swedish Railways) operates inter-city rail services using X 2000 and SJ 3000 (X55) trains in major routes across the country with top speeds of 205 km/h (125 mph). The operator brands them as snabbtåg ("fast trains") although "high-speed trains" is sometimes used in English language ads; however, the International Union of Railways only recognizes the 320 km/h (200 mph) line from Stockholm to Malmö and Gothenburg as the only high-speed rail lines in Sweden which is still in the planning stage, and are called "höghastighetsbanor" (high-speed railways).
- In Germany regional trains along the Munich-Nuremberg high speed line which was built for 300 km/h (185 mph) run at 200 km/h (125 mph) without being specially designated. Those trains use locomotives that are used for Intercity trains elsewhere and the higher speed (in comparison to other regional trains) was chosen mainly to increase capacity.
- The United Kingdom has service which run at 200 km/h (125 mph), such as the East Coast Main Line, West Coast Main Line, Great Western Main Line and Midland Main Line. But there are signaling upgrades currently happening on the East Coast Main Line and rolling stock to increase speeds to 225 km/h (140 mph).
- South Korea: MOLIT designates railway lines as three categories: high-speed railway lines (고속철도노선), semi-high-speed railway lines (준고속철도노선), or conventional railway lines (일반철도노선). High-speed railway lines are limited to dedicated lines with maximum speed over 300 km/h (185 mph), while semi-high-speed rail can be mixed-use lines with maximum speed ranged in 200 km/h (125 mph)–300 km/h (185 mph). For conventional railway lines, due to the limitation of signal systems and designed maximum speed of trains, most lines are limited by maximum speed under 150 km/h (95 mph). However, Gyeongchun line has been upgraded as a higher-speed railway line, with dedicated ITX-Cheongchun EMU trains designed as maximum speed of 180 km/h (110 mph).

=== Commuter rail services ===
Some commuter rail services that cover shorter distances may achieve similar speeds but they are not typically called as higher-speed rail. Some examples are:

- Numerous regional ICRs in China such as Dongguan–Huizhou intercity railway and Changsha–Zhuzhou–Xiangtan intercity railway operate up to 200 km/h (125 mph).
- Coaster links Oceanside, California and San Diego on Pacific Surfliner trackage with top speeds of 90 mph (140 km/h)
- MARC Penn Line covers 77 miles (124 km) on Northeast Corridor trackage and has been upgraded to 125 mph (200 km/h)
- Metrolink Orange County Line and Inland Empire–Orange County Line, also on Pacific Surfliner trackage, operate at top speeds of 90 mph (145 km/h) on segments south of Santa Ana and in Camp Pendleton.
- Caltrain electrification project is underway between San Francisco to Tamien station as part of upgrades for blended service with CHSR. The Caltrain trains will be capable of reaching speeds of up to 110 mph (175 km/h).

== Rail improvement strategies ==
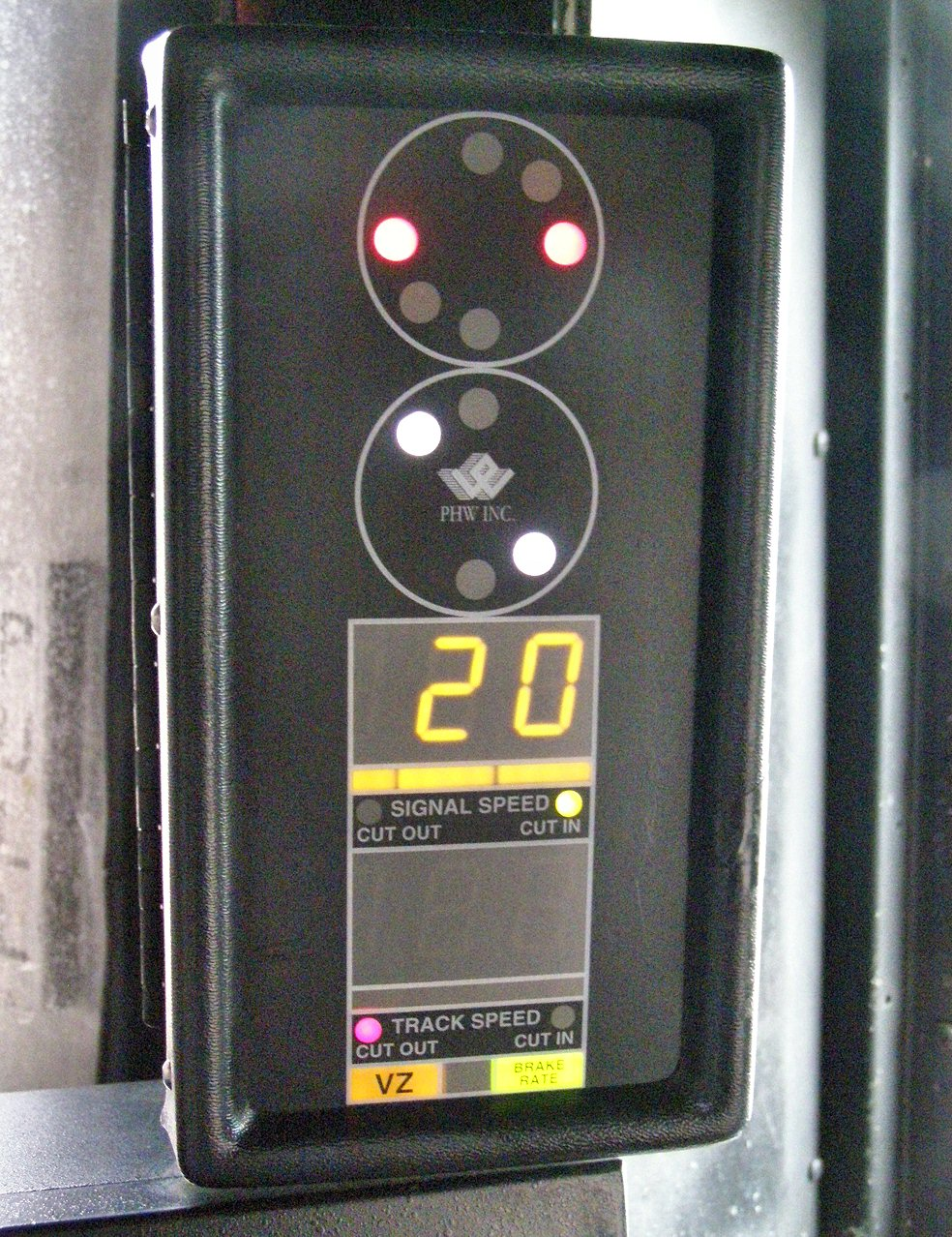
Cab display unit of ACSES, an approved PTC system

There are many types of trains that can support higher-speed rail operation. Usually, the rail infrastructure needs to be upgraded prior to such operation. However, the requirements to the infrastructure (signalling systems, curve radii, etc.) greatly increase with higher speeds, so an upgrade to a higher-speed standard is often simpler and less expensive than building new high-speed lines. But an upgrade to existing track currently in use, with busy traffic in some segments, introduces challenges associated with the construction work that could potentially disrupt the train services. The followings are some strategies used by regional transportation planners and rail track owners for their rail improvement projects in order to start the higher-speed rail services.

=== Signal upgrades ===
In Victoria, Australia, the increased top speeds from 130 to 160 km/h (80 to 100 mph) in the Regional Fast Rail project required a change to the signalling system to account for increased braking distance. Prior to the project, the system comprised a mixture of equipment from pre-World War I mechanical signalling to the remote control systems of the 1980s. In some cases, operators needed to telephone the local operators to manually control the signal boxes. With the new speeds, the signalling needed to be computerized. The project employed the Solid State Interlocking with the newly laid fiber-optic communication between the components to use three computer systems to control the signals. When the output of one computer differs from the other two, the system will fail that computer and continue the signal operations as long as the outputs from the other two computers are consistent. The project deployed the Train Protection & Warning System which allows the system to automatically applies the brakes at a sufficient distance to stop the train if the driver does not control the speeds adequately. The project also incorporated Train Control and Monitoring System to allow real-time monitoring of the position of trains.

In the United States, the first step to increase top speeds from 79 mph (127 km/h) is to install a new signal system that incorporates FRA-approved positive train control (PTC) system that is compatible with higher-speed rail operation. They are both transponder-based and GPS-based PTC systems currently in use in the United States. By a mandate, a significant portion of the railroads in the United States will be covered by PTC by the end of 2015.

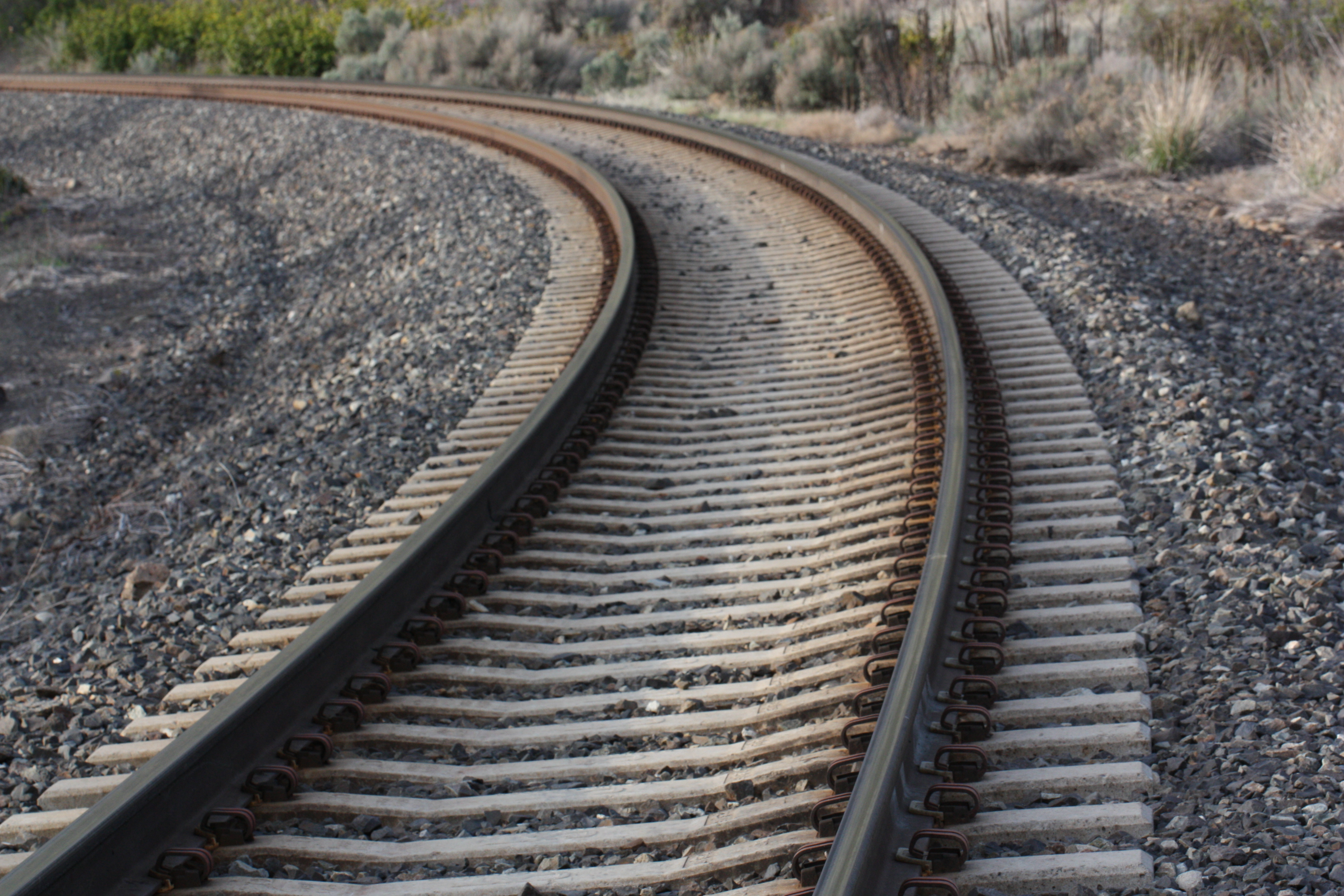
Concrete ties on a BNSF line

=== Track improvements ===
To support trains that run regularly at higher speeds, the rails need to be reliable. Most freight tracks have wooden ties which cause rails to become slightly misaligned over time due to wood rot, splitting and spike-pull (where the spike is gradually loosened from the tie). The concrete ties used to replace them are intended to make the track more stable, particularly with changes in temperature. Rail joints are also an issue, since most conventional rail lines use bolts and fishplates to join two sections of the rail together. This causes the joint to become slightly misaligned over time due to loosening bolts. To make for a smoother ride at higher speeds, the lengths of rail may be welded together to form continuous welded rail (CWR). However, the continuous welded rails are vulnerable to stress due to changes in temperature.

In Australia, the track condition before the Regional Fast Rail project could only support trains up to speeds of 130 km/h (80 mph). The tracks are with mixture of wooden and concrete ties. The rail weight varies but with majority being 47 kg/m (95 lb/yd). The track upgrade in the project included changing to use concrete ties and to use new standard of rail weight at 60 kg/m (121 lb/yd) in order to support the new top speeds of 160 km/h (100 mph).

There may be restriction in maximum operating speeds due to track geometry of existing line, especially on curves. Straightening the route, where possible, will reduce the travel time by increasing the allowable speeds and by reducing the length of track. When straight routes are not possible, reducing the number of curves and lowering the degree of curvature would result in higher achievable speeds on those curves. An example is the elimination of three consecutive reverse curves in favor of one larger curve. Raising superelevation may be considered for sharp curves which significantly limit speed. The higher speeds on those modified curves, together with the higher superelevation, will require track modification to have transition spirals to and from those curves to be longer.

Old turnouts may need replacement to allow trains to run through the turnouts at higher speeds. In the United States, some old turnouts have speed limit of 20 mph (30 km/h). Even with newer turnouts (rated #20), the diverging speed limit is still at 45 mph (70 km/h) which would significantly slow down the higher-speed train passing through those sections. High-speed turnouts (rated #32.7) are capable of handling maximum diverging speeds of 80 mph (130 km/h).

In order to minimize the downtime to upgrade tracks, a track renewal train (TRT) can automate much of the process, replacing rails, ties, and ballast at the rate of 2 miles per day. In the United States, a TRT is used by Union Pacific Railroad on the track shared with future higher-speed rail service in Illinois area.

For electrified track, the old catenary may need to be replaced. The fixed-tension catenary which is acceptable for low speeds may not be suitable for regular higher-speed rail services, where a constant tension is automatically maintained when temperature changes cause the length of the wire to expand or contract.

=== Crossing improvements ===
With trains running at higher speeds throughout the route, safety at all at-grade crossings needs to be considered.

In Australia, the levels of upgrade of the crossing in the rail improvements project were based on the risk analysis. The improvements included flashing light protection, automatic full barriers protection, and pedestrian gates crossings. The project also introduced the use of rubber panels at the crossings.

In the United States, the FRA limits train speeds to 110 mph (175 km/h) without an "impenetrable barrier" at each crossing. Even with that top speed, the grade crossings must have adequate means to prevent collisions. Another option is grade separation, but it could be cost-prohibitive and the planners may opt for at-grade crossing improvements instead.

The safety improvements at crossings can be done using combination of techniques. This includes passive devices such as upgraded signage and pavement markings. Another low-cost passive device is median separators which are installed along the center line of roadways, extending approximately 70 to 100 feet from the crossing, to discourage drivers from running around the crossing gates. More active devices include the four-quadrant gate, which blocks both sides of each traffic lane. Longer gate arms can cover 3/4 of the roadway. Video cameras can also be installed to catch the violators. A signal monitoring system can also be installed to alert the crews when the crossing equipment has malfunctioned.

In Norway, grade crossing speed are not permitted to exceed 160 km/h (100 mph).

=== Rerouting and passing sidings ===
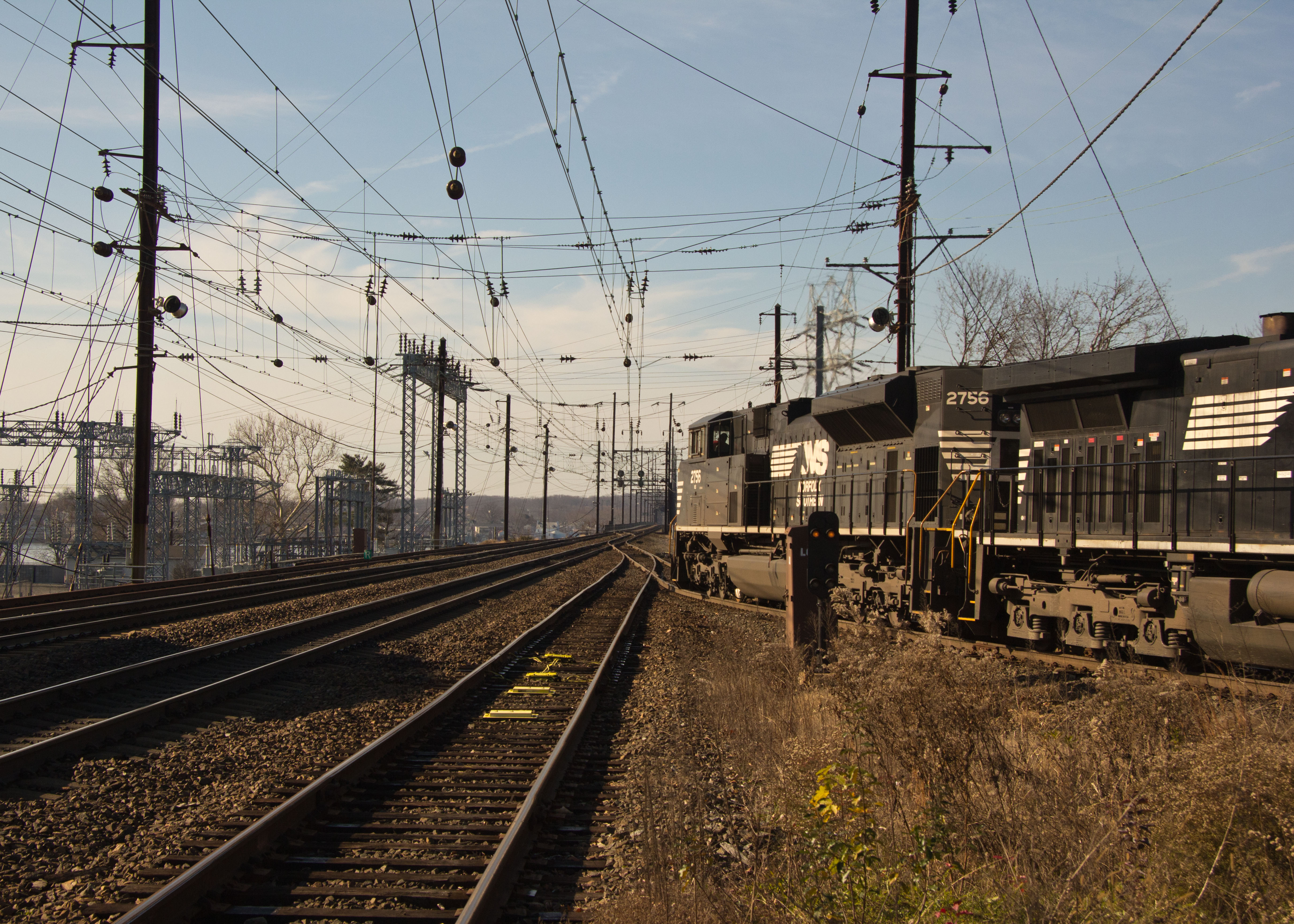
Norfolk Southern Railway freight enters the NEC from the Port Road Branch in Perryville, Maryland

In areas where there is frequent interference between freight and passenger trains due to congestion which causes the passenger trains to slow down, more extensive improvements may be needed. Certain segments of the line in congested areas may need to be rerouted. New track may need to be laid to avoid many curves which slow down the trains. In stretches of heavy freight train traffic, adding passing sidings along the segment should be considered. Sometimes certain stations may need to be bypassed.

=== Electrification ===
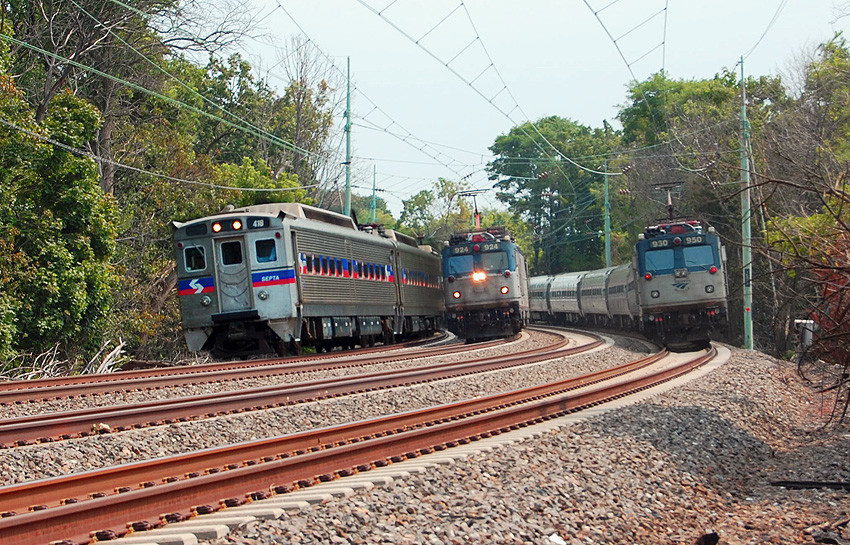
The "Main Line" portion of the Keystone Corridor is fully electrified.

Another consideration is electrification. Electrifying a railway line entails a major upgrade to the rail infrastructure and equipment. On the infrastructure side, it requires catenary lines to be built above the tracks. New transmission lines are needed to carry power from the power plants. Substations are required for each of the 40-mile (64 km) lengths to reduce severe voltage losses. There is also a need to consider the required amount of power supply and new power plants may be required. For locomotives, new electric locomotives are needed or existing diesel-electric locomotives can be retrofitted into all-electric locomotives, but it is a complicated task. These factors cause electrification to have high initial investment costs. The advantages of all-electric locomotives are that they provide quieter, cleaner and more reliable operations than the diesel-electric counterpart. The fuel consumption, locomotive maintenance costs and track wear of all all-electric locomotives are also lower. Furthermore, electric traction makes the operator more independent of oil price fluctuations and imports, as electricity can be generated from domestic resources or renewable energy. This was a major consideration in the electrification of the German Democratic Republic network, as lignite (and therefore electricity) was cheap and plentiful domestically whereas oil had to be imported at world market prices.

An alternative to catenary lines is to use a third rail system which has a semi-continuous rigid conductor placed alongside or between the rails of a railway track. However the operating speeds of this type of systems cannot be greater than 100 mph (160 km/h) due to its limitation of the power supply gaps at turnouts and grade crossings. Therefore, the third rail system is not generally used for higher-speed rail.

One example in the United States that does involve electrification is the Keystone Improvement Project to provide higher-speed rail service along the Harrisburg–Pittsburgh segment of the Keystone Corridor in Pennsylvania. The plan includes additional track, a new signal system and electrification. If completed as planned, this would allow Amtrak to utilize electric power continuously on service from Philadelphia to Pittsburgh. The first segment ("Main Line") has already been using electric locomotives with a top speed of 110 mph (175 km/h).

== In operation ==
=== United States ===
This is the list of the current higher-speed intercity and long-distance trains. For the list of trains with a top speed 110 mph (177 km/h) and above, see High-speed rail in the United States.

Service name	Route	Operator	Current Top speed	Average speed	Route length (miles)	Equipment	Note
Texas Eagle	Chicago–Los Angeles	Amtrak	100 mph (161 km/h)	55 mph (89 km/h)	2,728	Diesel-electric locomotive-hauled coaches	
Southwest Chief	Chicago–Los Angeles	Amtrak	90 mph (145 km/h)	55 mph (89 km/h)	2,256	Diesel-electric locomotive-hauled coaches	
Pacific Surfliner	Los Angeles–San Diego	Amtrak	90 mph (145 km/h)	55 mph (89 km/h)	130	Diesel-electric locomotive-hauled coaches	There is a study in place to increase maximum speed to 110 mph (177 km/h) when funding is available.

=== Australia ===
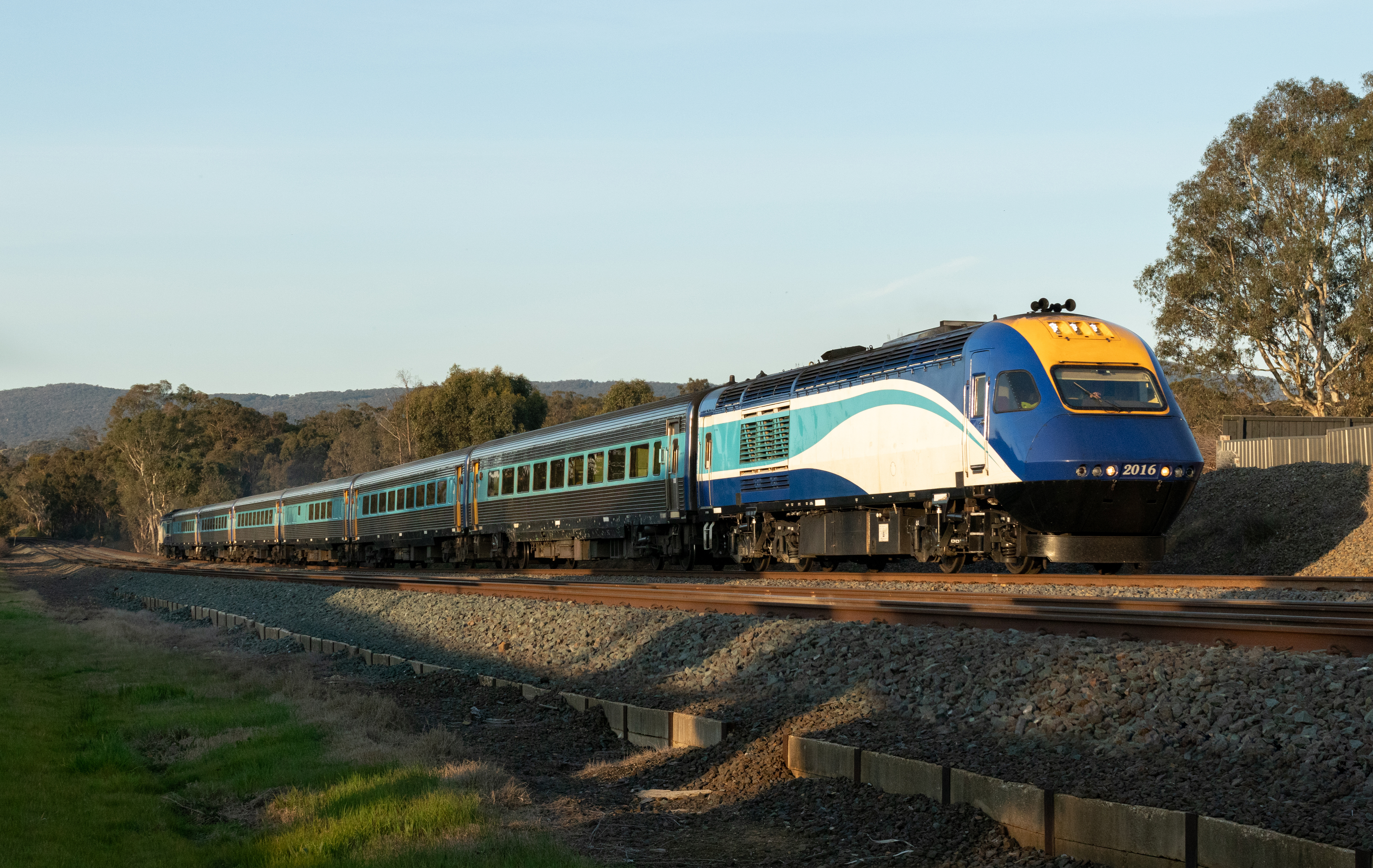
An XPT in September 2023

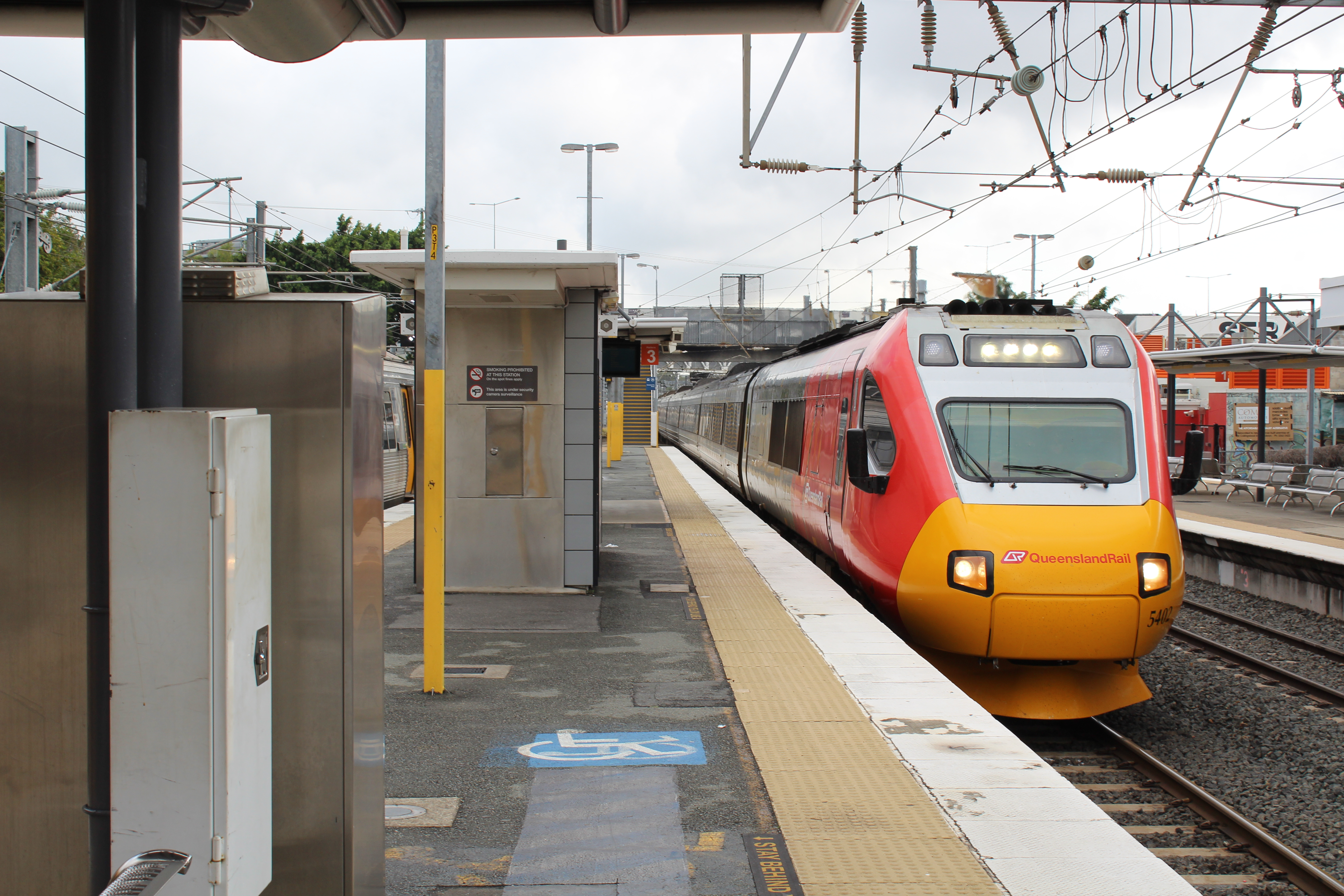
A Diesel Tilt Train at Bowen Hills

In 1978, the Public Transport Commission of New South Wales invited tenders for 25 high-speed railcars, though bidders were allowed to propose alternative types of high-speed train. Commonwealth Engineering submitted a tender for a fleet based on the British Rail designed InterCity 125, which had entered service in the United Kingdom in 1976. The XPT (Express Passenger Train) entered service in New South Wales in 1982. It significantly reduced travel times, cutting up to two hours off the trip from Sydney to Melbourne. The XPT operates at a top speed of 160 km/h (100 mph). However, it can theoretically reach speeds of 200 km/h (120 mph).

In 1999, the concept of Regional Fast Rail project was initiated by the government of Victoria with a goal to provide express higher-speed rail services between four main regional centres of Victoria (Geelong, Ballarat, Bendigo and the Latrobe Valley) and Melbourne. The initiative included a key component to upgrade rail infrastructure for top speeds of up to 160 km/h (100 mph). The development phase of initiative was between 2000 and 2002. Finally, the services on four lines began between 2005 and 2006 with top speeds of 160 km/h using VLocity trains.

The Electric Tilt Train entered service in Queensland in 1998 on the Spirit of Capricorn between Brisbane and Rockhampton. With a journey time of seven hours, they shaved over two hours from the schedule operated by the preceding InterCity Express sets. An Electric Tilt Train reached 210 km/h (130 mph) north of Bundaberg in May 1999, an Australian speed record that still stands and which makes it the fastest narrow-gauge train in the world. In August 1999, a contract was awarded to Walkers for two diesel tilting trains to operate services from Brisbane to Cairns. In contrast to the Electric Tilt Train, the Diesel Tilt Train is a push-pull locomotive based train. The maximum speed of the Tilt Trains in service is 160 km/h (99 mph).

In December 2000, Westrail awarded a contract to United Goninan, Broadmeadow for nine railcars to replace the 1971 built WAGR WCA/WCE class fleet. Seven were for Prospector and two for the AvonLink services. The first entered service on 28 June 2004. The new railcars are capable of 200 km/h (120 mph), but track conditions restrict their top speed to 160 km/h (99 mph).

=== China ===
Geographically accurate map of CRH services. Magenta and Red: High-speed rail Yellow: Higher-speed rail Black text in image: Cities that host CR divisions headquarters

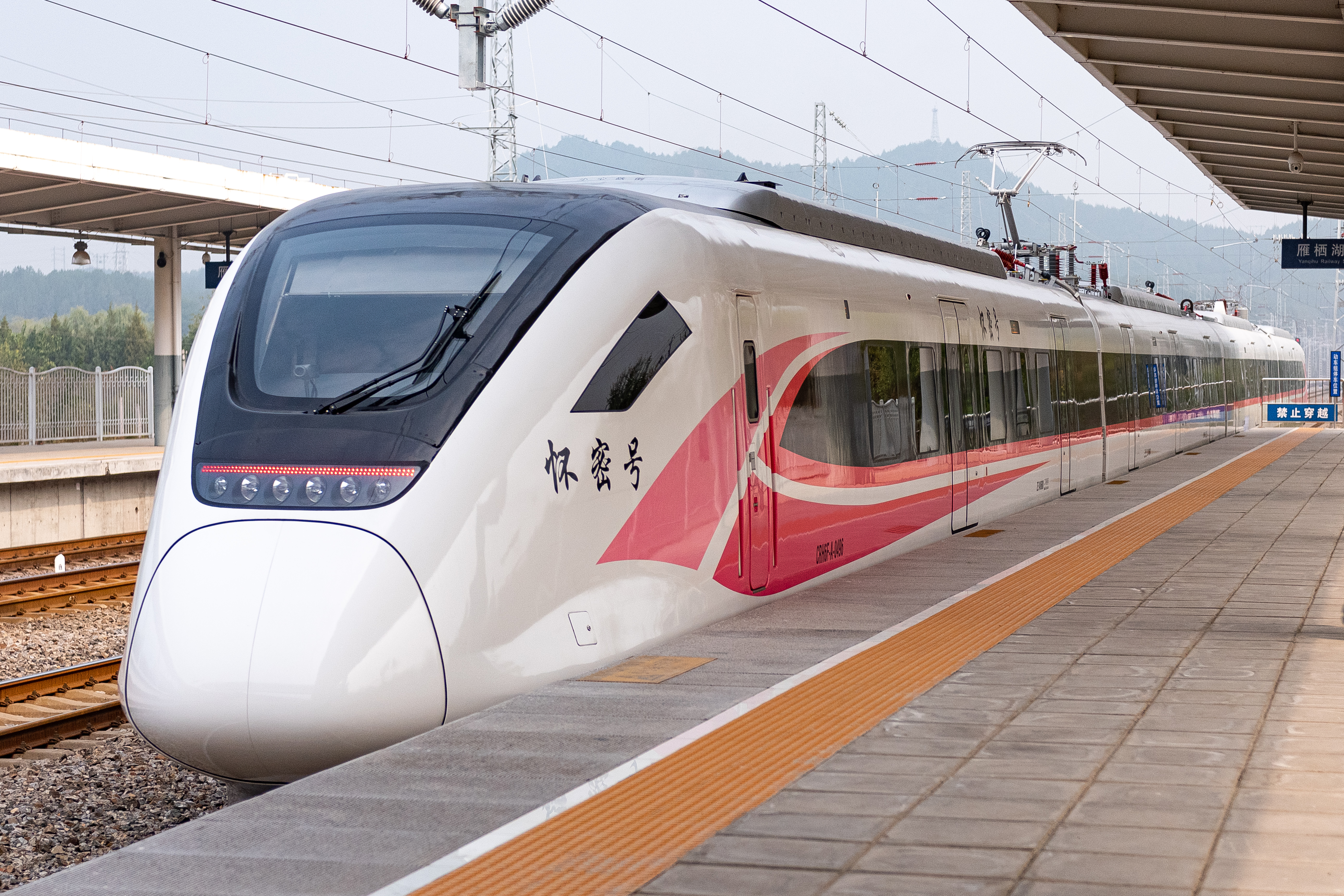
A S511 train in the Beijing Suburban Railway.

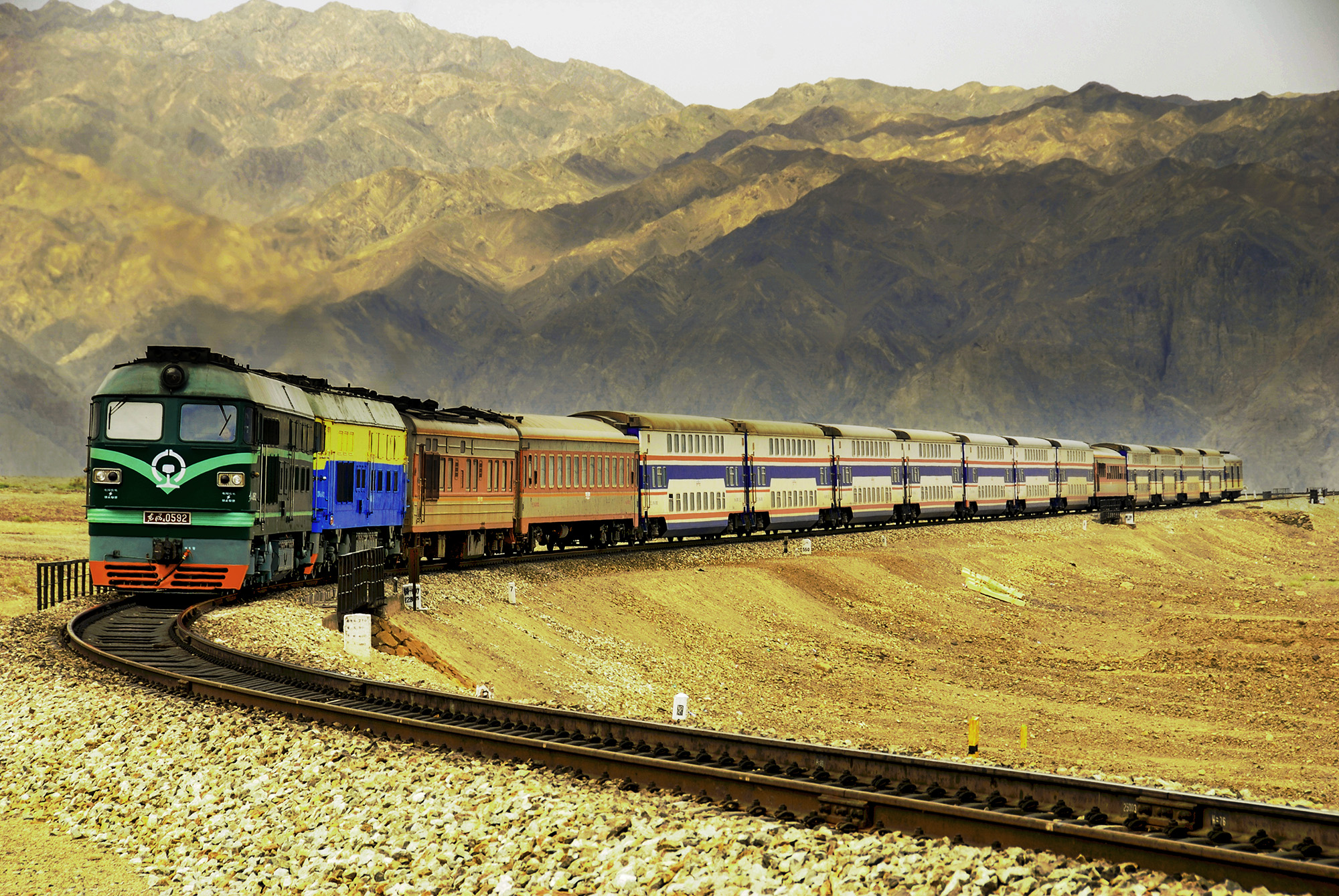
Train K9787 in the Southern Xinjiang railway.

In China, higher-speed railways are railways that are not officially categorized as high-speed rail but allow CRH EMUs run on it with speeds up to 200 km/h. Typically these lines are classified as Grade I conventional railways and are used by both passenger and freight services.

Note that the majority of high-speed lines are also called "passenger-only"(Chinese: 客运专线) lines. Inside mainland China this word invokes a sense of higher-speed rail but the wording usage is inconsistent.

==== Train identifiers ====
Identifiers starting with G indicates at least part of the train's route operates at a maximum 300 km/h or above (this is a characteristic of the line rather than the precise maximum speed of this exact train) and not running at deliberately reduced speed on any section. Other sections of the route may have lower speeds as low as 160 km/h.

Identifiers starting with C indicates short-distance travel using CRH trains, the maximum speed is irrelevant (ranging from 160 km/h Ürümqi-Korla service to 350 km/h Beijing–Tianjin (via intercity) service).

Identifiers starting with D indicates CRH services with maximum speed 265 km/h or less, including overnight sleepers on 310 km/h Beijing–Guangzhou line (running them 310 km/h overnight not only causes noises but also disturbs sleeping patterns of passengers. This is an example of deliberately reduced speeds).

Identifiers starting with S indicates metropolitan services using CRH rolling stock and have a different fare system to the national one. Their maximum speed is 160 km/h.

Note: The start and end station in the following lists accounts only CRH services. * denotes some section of this line doesn't have 160 km/h CRH services.

==== Conventional lines running CRH services ====
Line name	Line name (Chinese)	start station	end station	Train identifiers	Note
Southern Xinjiang*	南疆线(吐库二线段)	Turpan/Turpan North	Korla	C T K Y none	
Lanzhou–Xinjiang (West)* (including Second track)	兰新线西段(北疆线)	Ürümqi	Bole	C T K Y	Bole station where Boltala Prefecture branch splits is no longer a passenger stop.
Jinghe–Khorgos	精伊霍铁路	Jinghe South	Khorgos	C T K Y	
Boltala Prefecture branch	博州支线	Bole	Boltala	C T K Y	
Liuyuan–Golmud*	柳格线柳敦段	Yumen	Dunhuang	D K Y none	No CRH train from/to Dunhuang stops at Yumen.
Changchun–Baicheng; Baicheng–Arxan*	长白·白阿线(长乌段)	Changchun	Ulanhot	C Z K	
Hohhot–Ordos	呼鄂线	Hohhot East	Ordos	D Z K	
Beijing Suburban: Huairou–Miyun	北京市郊怀密线	Qinghe	Gubeikou	S	
Beijing Suburban: Sub-Center	北京市郊副中心线	Liangxiang	Qiaozhuang East	S	
Tianjin–Jizhou	津蓟铁路	Tianjin	Jizhou North	S	
Beijing–Qinhuangdao	京秦线(京哈线)	Beijing	Qinhuangdao	D Z T K Y	Both conventional and high-speed services has some detouring to Tianjin instead.
Xiong'an Area	雄安地区动车	Shijiazhuang	Beijing South	D Z T K Y	Section between Xushui East and Bazhou West is high-speed Tianjin–Baoding intercity railway(mixed traffic). G class trains running solely on aforementioned section is not counted. Section between Shijiazhuang and Xushui East is Beijing–Guangzhou railway. Section between Bazhou West and Beijing South is Beijing–Kowloon railway.
Northern Tongpu Quadruple Track*	北同蒲三四线	Huairen East	Yuanping West	D Z K	Part of Datong-Xi'an high-speed line.
Beijing–Shanghai Overnight Sleepers	京沪动卧	Beijing	Hangzhou	D	2/1/3 pair(s) of trains between Beijing and Shanghai/Nanjing/Hangzhou daily. Trains to Hangzhou have section between Kunshan and Hangzhou runs via Shanghai–Kunming railway and does not stop at Shanghai.
Longkou–Yantai	龙烟线	Longkoushi	Yantai	D	
Nanjing–Qidong*	宁启线南启段	Nantong	Qidong	D	Section between Nanjing and Nantong is 200 km/h
CR Shanghai Suburban (Shaoxing)	上海局市域(绍兴)	Qianqing	Shangyu	S	Locally administered
CR Shanghai Suburban (Ningbo)	上海局市域(宁波)	Ningbo	Yuyao	S	Locally administered
Dazhou–Chengdu*	达成线成遂段	Dazhou	Suining	D Z T K	Section between Suining and Chengdu is 200 km/h
Xiangyang–Chongqing*	襄渝线达渝段	Dazhou	Chongqing North	D T K	
Nanchong–Gaoxing	南高线	Nanchong	Gaoxing	D	Gaoxing station connects to Dazhou-Chongqing but is not a passenger stop
Shimen County–Changsha	石长线	Shimenxian North	Changsha	D T K	
Kunming–Hekou*	昆玉河铁路(标准轨)	Yuxi	Hekou North	C K	CRH service between Yuxi and Kunming South run on Kunming–Yuxi intercity railway (200 km/h)
Shanghai–Kunming*	沪昆线宣昆段	Xuanwei	Kunming	C Z T K none	
Litang–Zhanjiang*	黎湛线贵玉段	Guigang	Yulin	D T K none	
Shejiang–Shantou*	畲汕线潮汕至汕头	Chaoshan	Shantou	G D K	

==== Newly built lines operating less than 200 km/h speed ====
Line name	Line name (Chinese)	start station	end station	Train identifiers	Note
Shanghai Area: Jinshan	金山线	Shanghai South	Jinshanwei	S	
Zhongchuan Airport intercity	中川机场城际	Lanzhou West	Zhongchuan Airport	C D	Lanzhou Area only except a single round trip to/from Tianshui South.
Beijing Subway Daxing Airport Express	北京地铁大兴机场线	Caoqiao	Daxing Airport	Not exist	Not part of China Railway System.
Baotou-Xi'an*	包西线西延段	Xi'an	Yan'an	D Z T K	Different from Baotou–Xi'an high-speed railway (under construction).
Nanjing–Chengdu*	宁蓉线宜凉段 (宜万铁路)	Yichang East	Liangwu	G D Z K	Passenger service branches at Lichuan.
Lanzhou–Chongqing	兰渝铁路	Lanzhou	Chongqing North	G D Z K	
Changsha–Zhuzhou/Xiangtan	长株潭城际铁路	Changsha West	Zhuzhou South/Xiangtan	C	
Guiyang–Kaiyang	贵开城际铁路	Guiyang North	Kaiyang	C	
Guiyang Loop Line	贵阳市域铁路环线	Loop Line		C	
Guangzhou-Shenzhen (quadruple track)	广深线(城际线)	Foshan West	Shenzhen	C D	Through operation to Huaiji (Guiyang–Guangzhou high-speed line), it operates at 180 km/h.

==== Designated 200 km/h, operating 160 km/h lines with currently no C/D/G class services ====
Line name	Line name (Chinese)	start station	end station	Train identifiers	Note
Jining–Baotou quadruple track*	集包第二双线	Jining South	Hohhot East	Z T K none	The section between Hohhot East and Baotou is high-speed rail. The section between Jining South and Hohhot differs from Zhangjiakou–Hohhot high-speed railway (all of this line's D class service is transfterred to it).
Taiyuan–Zhongwei/Yinchuan Corridor	太中银通道	Taiyuan	Zhongwei/Yinchuan	Z T K none	

==== Slow speeds on lines normally running high-speed ====
This section lists the deliberately reduced scenarios mentioned in "train identifiers" section above.

Line name	Line name (Chinese)	start station	end station	Train identifiers	Note
Southeast coastal sleepers	沪广动卧	Shanghai Hongqiao/Shanghai	Guangzhou South/Zhuhai	D	Section between Shanghai and Hangzhou uses Shanghai–Kunming high-speed line. Section between Shenzhen North and Zhuhai uses Guangzhou-Shenzhen-Hong Kong high-speed line and Guangzhou-Zhuhai intercity line.
Beijing–Guangzhou sleepers	京广动卧	Beijing	Guangzhou South and others (see note)	D	Overnight service to Shenzhen North, Zhuhai, Zhanjiang West and Kunming using Beijing–Guangzhou–Shenzhen, Guangzhou-Zhuhai, Xinhui–Maoming–Zhanjiang and Shanghai–Kunming high-speed lines.

=== Greece ===
Since 1997, ongoing construction to upgrade and built higher-speed lines capable of speeds of up to 200 km/h (120 mph) is conducted. The P.A.Th.E. Plan (Patras-Athens-Thessaloniki-Evzonoi), as it is called aims at reduced journey times between Greece's main cities (Athens, Thessaloniki and Patra) as well as an improved rail connection between Greece and North Macedonia. Currently, only the modernized lines of Domokos–Thessaloniki, Athens Airport–Kiato, and Thessaloniki–Strymonas are in operation at maximum speeds of 160 km/h (99 mph).

=== India ===
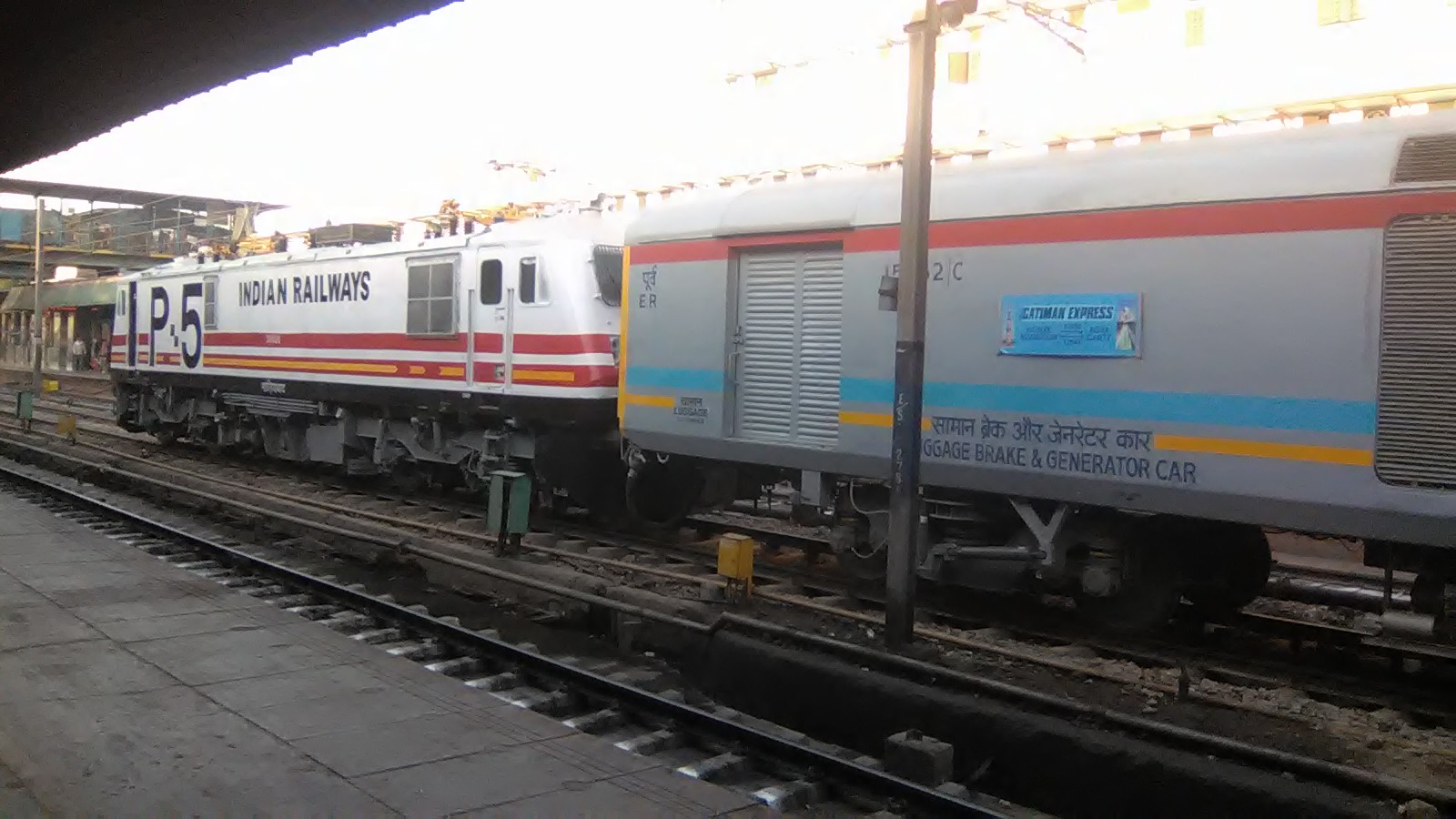
Gatiman Express at New Delhi railway station

Tejas Express in Mumbai

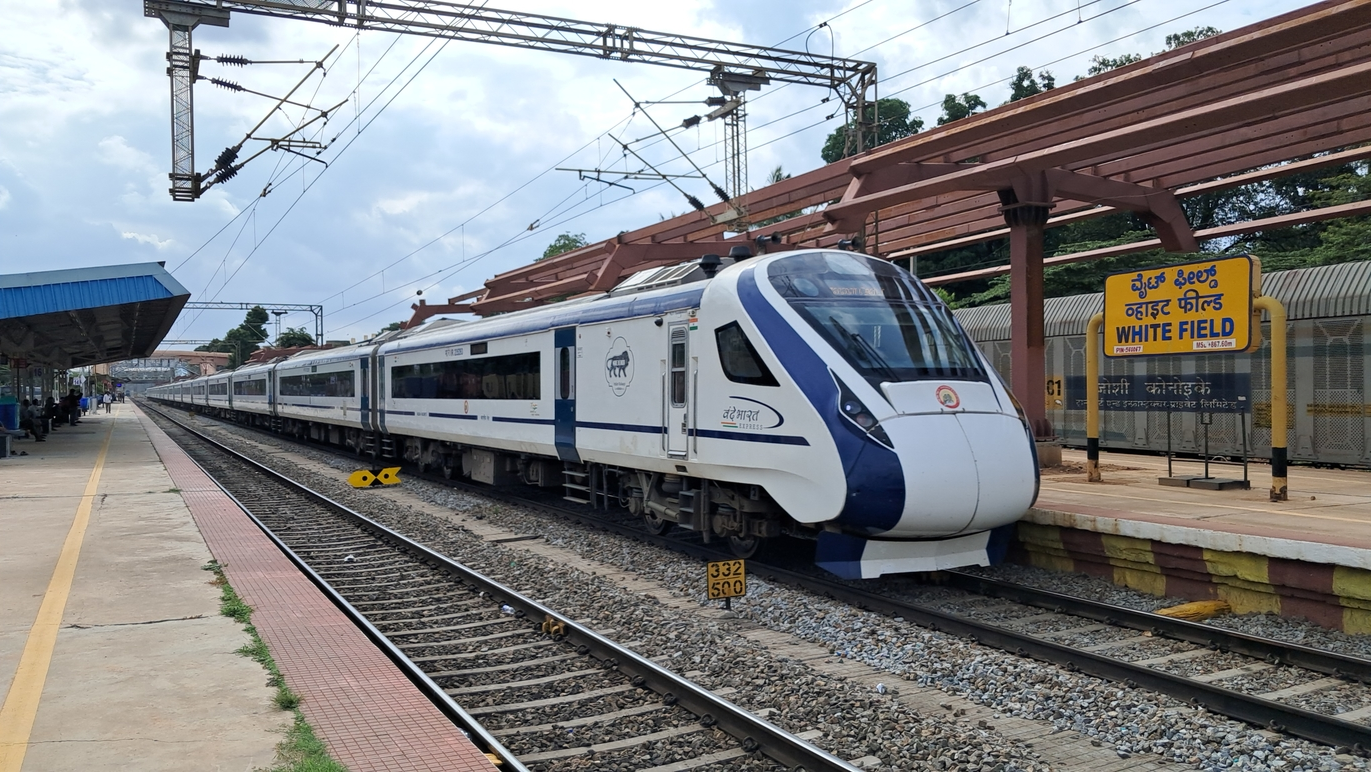
Vande Bharat Express in Bengaluru heading towards Chennai

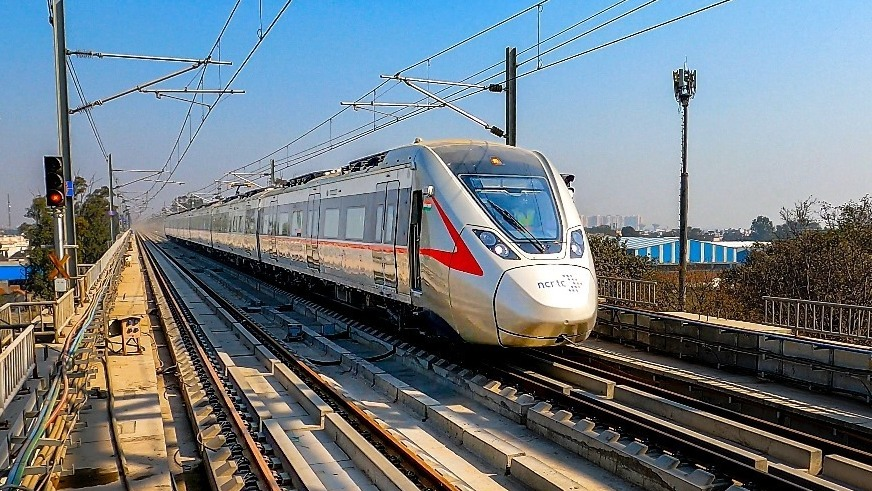
RapidX train in Delhi-Meerut RRTS

The Gatiman Express was India's first semi-high speed train. In October 2014, the railways applied for safety certificate from Commission of Railway Safety to start the service. In June 2015, the train was officially announced. The train was launched on 5 April 2016 and completed its maiden journey between Nizamuddin and Agra Cantt within 100 minutes. But due to low occupancy, Indian Railways first extended this train from Agra to Gwalior on 19 February 2018 and then to Jhansi on 1 April 2018.

The Tejas Express was Introduced by Indian Railways in 2017. It features modern onboard facilities with doors which are operated automatically. Tejas means "sharp", "lustre" and "brilliance" in many Indian languages. The inaugural run of Tejas Express was on 24 May 2017 from Mumbai Chhatrapati Shivaji Terminus to Karmali, Goa. It covered 552 km in 8 hours and 30 minutes. On 1 March 2019, second Tejas Express of the country was flagged off between Chennai Egmore and Madurai Junction by Prime Minister Narendra Modi. It covered 497 km in 6 hours and 30 minutes. Lucknow–New Delhi Tejas Express, which was inaugurated on 4 October 2019, is India's first train operated by private operators, IRCTC, a subsidiary of Indian Railways. The Ahmedabad–Mumbai Tejas express, also operated by IRCTC was inaugurated on 17 January 2020. From 1 September 2021, the train LHB Rajdhani Rakes are replaced with LHB Tejas Sleeper Rakes. This increased the speed of the train to 130 km/h. The train can travel at a top speed of 160 km/h making it a Semi-High Speed Train.

In 2021, Indian Railways started to upgrade Rajdhani Coaches to Tejas coaches. This replaced its traditional LHB Rajdhani coaches On 15 February 2021, the Agartala Rajdhani Express was upgraded with Tejas livery Sleeper Coaches. On 19 July 2021, the Mumbai Rajdhani Express was upgraded to Tejas class smart coaches. LHB Rajdhani coaches. On 1 September 2021 the Rajendra Nagar Patna Rajdhani Express was upgraded to Tejas rakes. This increased the speed of the train to 130 km/h. The train can travel at a top speed of 160 km/h.

In 2019, Vande Bharat Express, also known as Train 18, was inaugurated. This is an Indian higher-speed rail intercity electric multiple unit. It was designed and built by Integral Coach Factory (ICF) at Perambur, Chennai under the Indian government's Make in India initiative over a span of 18 months. The unit cost of the first rake was given as ₹1 billion (US$11 million), though the unit cost is expected to go down with subsequent production. At the original price, it is estimated to be 40% cheaper than a similar train imported from Europe. The train was launched on 15 February 2019, from Delhi to Varanasi. The service was named 'Vande Bharat Express' on 27 January 2019. On 5 October 2019, a second Vande Bharat Express was opened from Delhi to Katra On 30 September 2022, Prime Minister Narendra Modi inaugurated a 3rd Vande Bharat Express rake connecting Mumbai and Ahmedabad passing through Surat. This rake was an upgraded second generation version. an other second generation rake was inaugurated from Delhi to Una passing through Chandigarh.

The Delhi Meerut Regional Rapid Transit System (RRTS), also known as RapidX, is a semi high-speed rail project inaugurated in 2023. Trains, called Namo Bharat trains, can reach speeds of up to 180 kilometers per hour.

Inaugural run and entry into service

The train flagged off for an inaugural run by Prime Minister of India Narendra Modi, on 15 February 2019, with its commercial run started from 17 February 2019 onwards. It will be running on the Delhi-Varanasi route, via Kanpur and Prayagraj, connecting the holy city of Varanasi to the Capital city, reducing travel time along the route by 15 percent. The train's regenerative brakes are also expected to allow a 30% savings in electricity costs as compared to its predecessor. At an operating speed of 160 kilometres per hour (99 mph), it will outpace the Shatabdi Express by 30 kilometres per hour (19 mph). Although the trainset has been tested for speeds up to 180 km/h, it is capable of running at speed of 200 km/h. Every other car on the train is motorised. The 8-hour journey from New Delhi to Varanasi station has the Chair Car CC Class fare of ₹1,755.00 and covers the total distance of about 762 kilometers.

=== Japan ===
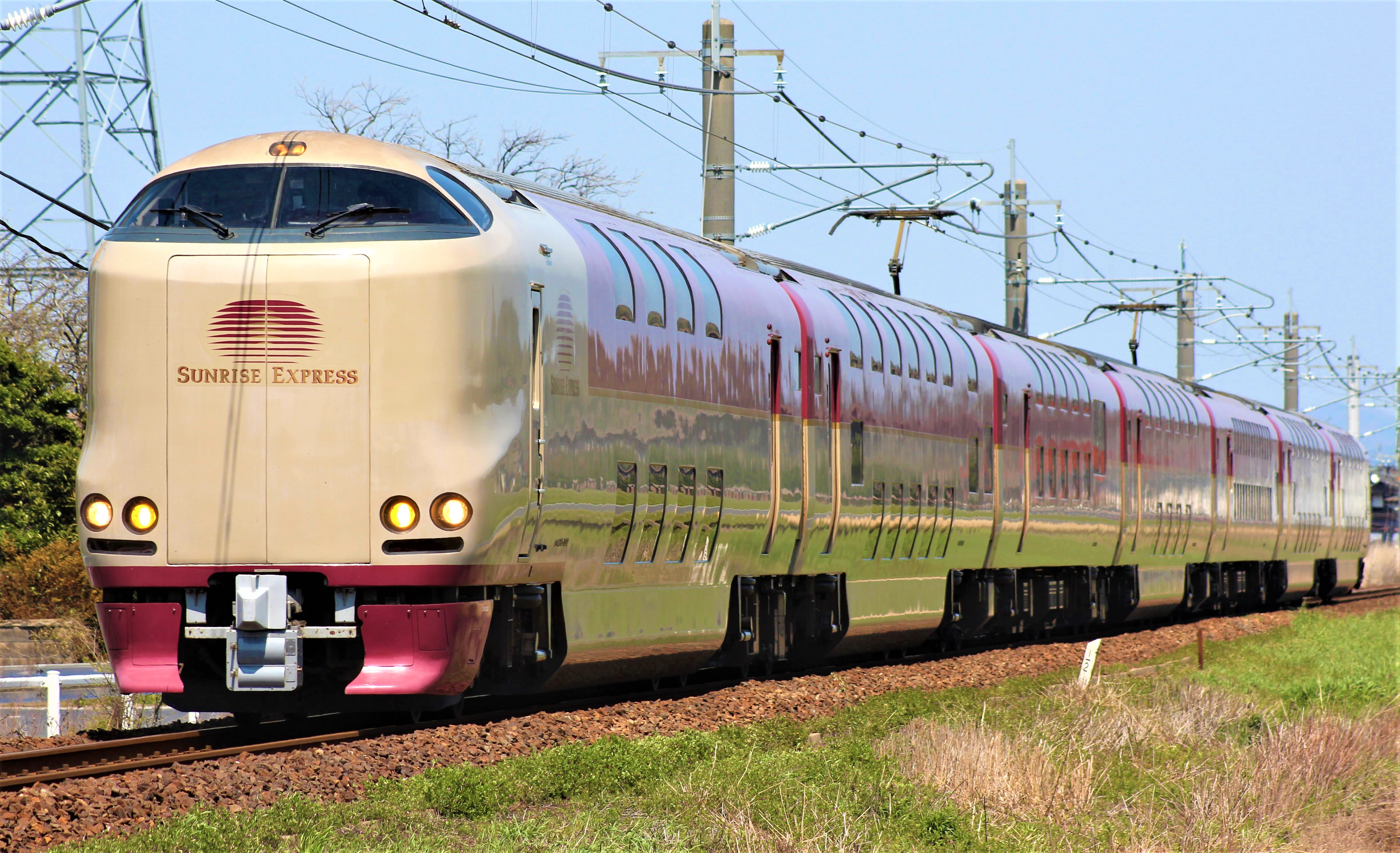
Sunrise Izumo from Tokyo heading towards Izumo, Shimane

The Skyliner limited express train service between Tokyo and Narita Airport in the fastest non-Shinkansen rail service in the country, with a speed of 160 km/h (99 mph).

Before 2015, the Hakutaka limited express train service on the Hokuhoku Line in Niigata Prefecture also matched the speed of 160 km/h (99 mph). However, after the opening of Hokuriku Shinkansen on 14 March 2015, the maximum speed limit of the line was reduced to 130 km/h (80 mph).

=== South Korea ===
Great Train eXpress (GTX), a commuter rail network in the Seoul Metropolitan Area, has a speed of 180 km/h (110 mph). Only one line, GTX-A, is currently operating. Two more lines, GTX-B and GTX-C, are scheduled to open in 2030. Three other lines, named GTX-D, GTX-E and GTX-F, are currently being planned.

=== Laos ===
Passenger trains on the 2021 opened Boten–Vientiane railway travel at speeds of up to 160 km/h, however the railway has been described as 'high-speed' as well. Some sections of the railway were planned to allow speeds of up to 200 km/h, however this was downgraded to 160 km/h in the final design.

== Earlier attempts ==
=== Canada ===
There have been several different attempts at higher speed rail in the Quebec City–Windsor Corridor, and several high speed rail attempts as well.

=== Ireland ===
In 2010, a report was commissioned by the Chartered Institute of Logistics and Transport as a mid-term review of Transport 21, an Irish infrastructure plan announced in 2005. The report recommended, among other things, the development of national rail to provide higher-speed rail services. However, there has been no progress towards implementing the recommendation.

=== United States ===
There have been long-range visions to establish high/higher-speed rail networks in different regions of the United States but without adequate funding. During the American Recovery and Reinvestment Act of 2009, there was a surge of interest to apply for grants from the federal government to start those projects. However, many proposals have been put on hold or cancelled after failing to secure funding or support from the public or key local politicians.

==== Amtrak Cascades ====
Amtrak Cascades, a 467-mile (752 km) intercity rail service, stretches from Eugene, Oregon, through the State of Washington to Vancouver, British Columbia, in Canada. As of 2010, the long-term goal of this corridor was to have the top speeds of the segment of Eugene, Oregon, to Blaine, Washington, with top speeds in the 90 to 120 mph (145 to 195 km/h) range, and eventually 150 mph (240 km/h) on a dedicated track. However, as of 2012, the Washington State Department of Transportation plans for its 300-mile (480 km) stretch to have top speeds of only 79 mph (127 km/h), and the plan in Oregon is to limit the speeds to 79 mph (127 km/h) as well, with safety and other freight service concerns voiced by the track owner, Union Pacific Railroad. This essentially halts the plan to provide a higher-speed rail service on this corridor in the near future.

==== Minnesota ====
The Northern Lights Express project, in the planning stages and proposed to begin construction in 2017, would upgrade the BNSF trackage between Minneapolis and Duluth to support service up to 90 mph (145 km/h).

Other higher-speed rail proposals are periodically considered, but would need to pass through neighboring states, which have thus far not agreed to cooperate. Minnesota transportation planners proposed a higher-speed rail service called the River Route, with top speeds of 110 mph (175 km/h), between Minneapolis–Saint Paul, Minnesota, and Chicago, via Milwaukee, Wisconsin, which follows the Empire Builder route. The service would eventually open in 2024 as the Borealis, though with a top speed of only 79 mph (127 km/h).

Another alternative that has been discussed is to have a new route that heads south to Iowa to join the rail link from Iowa to Chicago. There was a report in 2011 that Iowa would halt its involvement in high/higher-speed rail projects. However, the Iowa Department of Transportation and Illinois Department of Transportation continue to pursue the study of rail link between Chicago and Omaha, Nebraska, through Iowa with top speeds of 110 mph (175 km/h). Therefore, the status of the proposal to link Minneapolis–Saint Paul with Chicago via Iowa is unknown.

==== New York ====
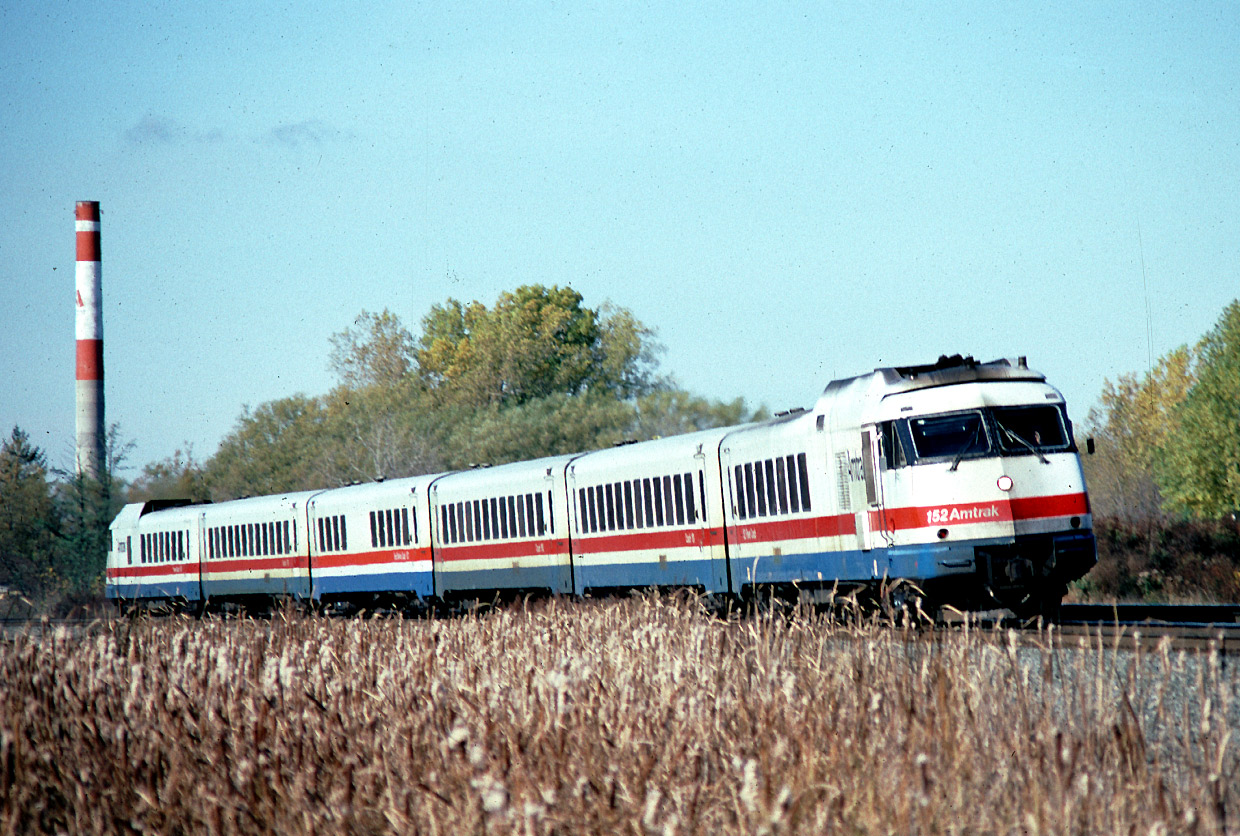
An un-rebuilt RTL Turboliner in New York in 1983.

In 1998, New York State initiated a $185 million program in partnership with Amtrak to increase the speeds of the Empire Service to 125 mph (200 km/h) by reconstructing all seven gas-turbine Turboliner trainsets, originally built in 1976–1977, to the new RTL-III specification. The reconstructed trains, coupled with track improvements, would cut the travel time between New York City and Albany by 20 minutes. However, the project ran into many problems including issues with the trains and the unsuccessful implementation of required track improvements. New York ended the rehabilitation program in 2005 after spending $70.3 million. Fallout over the program led to litigation between New York and Amtrak; Amtrak would eventually pay New York $20 million and commit to funding $10 million in track improvements. New York auctioned off its surplus Turboliners in 2012 for $420,000.

==== Ohio ====
The Ohio Hub, a rail improvement project proposed by the Ohio Department of Transportation, is aimed at revitalizing passenger rail service in the Ohio region. The proposal was to increase the top speeds to 110 mph (175 km/h) in the network connecting Cleveland, Columbus, and Cincinnati, commonly referred as the 3-C corridor. The project is currently in an unknown state after the U.S. government rescinded the federal funding from Ohio and redirected it to other states.

==== Wisconsin ====
In October 2009, the Wisconsin Department of Transportation adopted the Connections 2030 plan which is the long-range plan for state transportation needs. The plan includes Wisconsin Rail Plan 2030, the twenty-year plan to improve the state railroad system by 2030. In the rail plan, there is a multi-phase project to upgrade the rail service from Chicago, to Milwaukee and Madison, Wisconsin, with top speeds of 110 mph (175 km/h). The latter phases of the project will expand the same service to Minneapolis–Saint Paul in Minnesota and another route to Green Bay, Wisconsin. There was a reaction against the project in 2010, and the $810 million grant the state originally received for the project from the federal government was rescinded. As of 2012, the rail plan is postponed indefinitely.

== Current efforts ==
=== Baltic states ===
The three Baltic states have been working with the European Union as part of the Trans-European Transport Networks (TEN-T) initiative on a study to build a higher-speed rail line in the Rail Baltica corridor to connect Warsaw, in Poland, and Tallinn, in Estonia.

=== Bangladesh ===
Bangladesh Government has taken initiatives to develop high-speed rail (HSR) in between its two major cities – Dhaka, the National Capital City and Chattogram (former Chittagong), the second largest and the principal Port City of the country. Bangladesh Railway (BR), the Government-owned and-managed transportation agency of the country, signed a contract of BDT 102 crore on 31 May 2018 with a Consortium of China Railway Design Corporation (CRDC), a Chinese Company and Mazumder Enterprise (ME), a Bangladeshi Pvt. Ltd. Company for feasibility study and detailed design for construction of proposed Dhaka-Chattogram via Cumilla/Laksam HSR line.

With 320.79 km length, Dhaka-Chattogram is the main business corridor and life line of BR, and at present, the railway route is a circuitous way through Tongi-Bhairab Bazar-Brahmanbaria-Cumilla-Chattogram. The proposed shorter route, which would be Dhaka-Cumilla/Laksham-Chattogram, will cut short the length by about 91 km, making the total length around 230 km. The expected speed of the proposed HSR would be above 300 km/h (yet to determine) and it would take less than one hour to reach Chattogram from Dhaka, which currently takes more than five hours. Under the 18-month contract, the Consortium's responsibilities will include identifying alternative alignments, assessing the viability of the project, preparing detailed engineering design, and cost estimation.

=== Canada ===
For a rail route to connect Windsor, Ontario to Detroit, Michigan in the United States, a higher-speed rail plan was proposed as an alternative after a study on the Windsor to Quebec City route in Canada was to consider only high-speed rail with top speeds of 200 km/h (125 mph) or more. Politicians in Windsor area proposed in 2012 that having higher-speed rail connection between Windsor and Detroit must be part of the consideration.

Another feasibility study is ongoing as part of the Northern New England Intercity Rail Initiative to connect between Boston and Montreal trains at top speeds of 90 mph (145 km/h).

=== Greece ===
A project to modernize railway network in Greece is ongoing. A new 106 km (66 mi) alignment between Tithorea and Domokos is designed to avoid the mountainous part. The new line will have speeds of 160 and 200 km/h (100 and 125 mph).

=== India ===
In October 2013, the Minister of Railways announced at the two-day international technical conference on High Speed Rail Travel; Low Cost Solution that the focus of India's rail improvement was to implement a lower-cost solution to meet immediate needs by providing higher-speed rail services as an incremental step before dedicated-track high-speed rail can be achieved. India's higher-speed rail would be in the range of 160 and 200 km/h (100 and 125 mph). On 3 July 2014, a trial run with new top speeds of 160 km/h (100 mph) was successfully completed on a journey of 200 km (125 mi) between Delhi and Agra. The new service, operational since 5 April 2016, cut the travel time from 126 minutes (compared to standard trains) with a top speed of 160 km/h (99 mph) to 99 minutes.

In 2019, the government approved 3 rapid regional railways including the Delhi–Meerut Regional Rapid Transit System with speeds up to 160 km/h.

In June 2020, the government of Kerala approved the Thiruvananthapuram–Kasargode Semi High Speed Rail Corridor or Silver line, a Semi-High speed rail line connecting the state.

In July 2021, the Government announced plans to create 10 new Vande Bharat Express lines connecting over 40 cities. This is planned to be done by 2022.

=== Malaysia ===
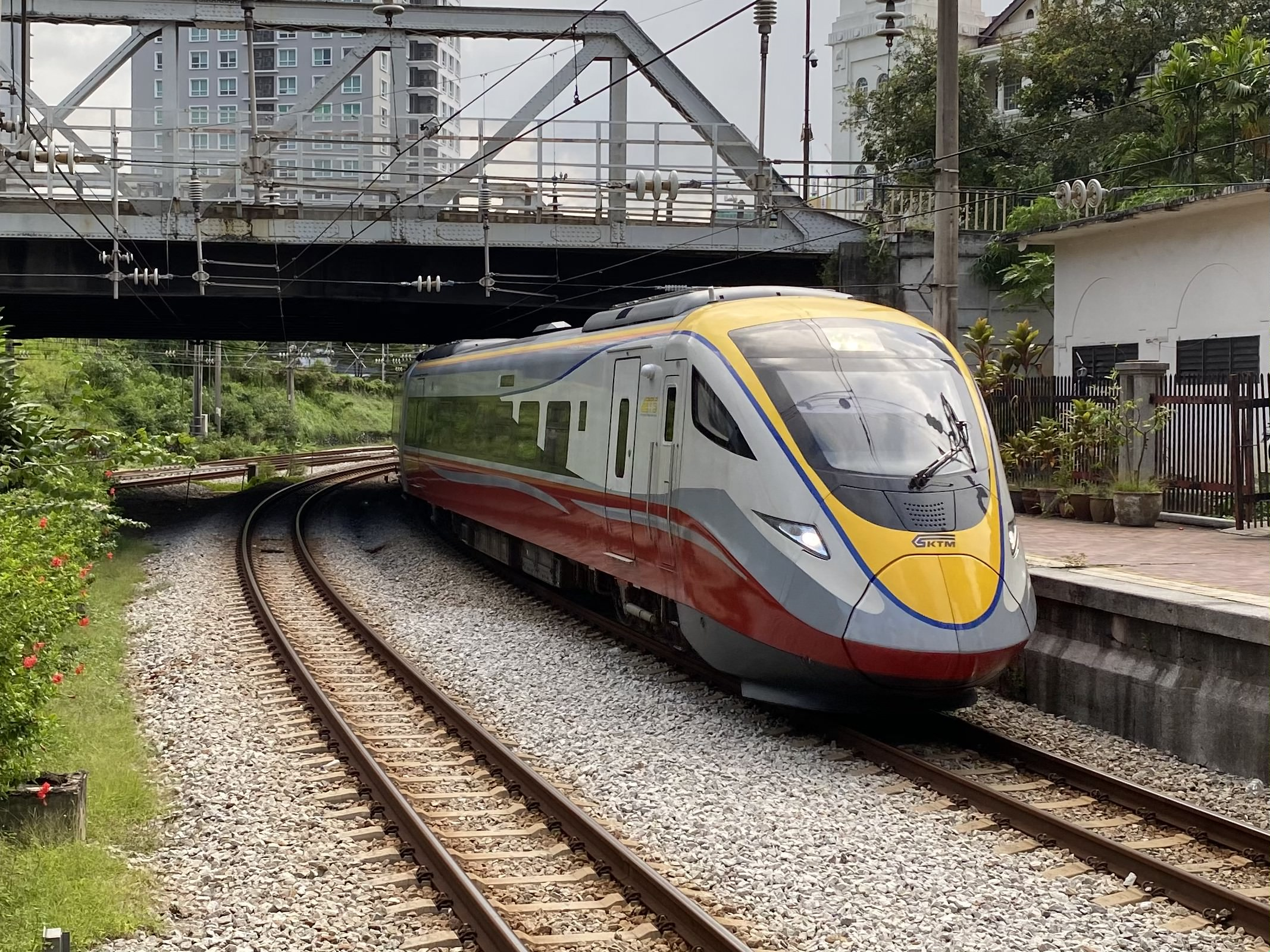
A KTM Class 93 (Platinum service) arriving in Kuala Lumpur

The KTM ETS is an inter-city rail service operated by Keretapi Tanah Melayu Berhad utilising electric multiple units. It is the second electric train service to be operated by the Malaysian railway company, after the KTM Komuter service.

Commencing in August 2010, the ETS is the fastest metre gauge train service in Malaysia and operates along the electrified and double-tracked stretch of the West Coast Line between Gemas and Padang Besar on the Malaysia–Thailand border, forming part of the north–south rail corridor of Peninsular Malaysia.

With the completion and commissioning of the Gemas–Johor Bahru Electrified Double Track Project on 11 December 2025, ETS services were extended to JB Sentral, located near the southern terminus of Peninsular Malaysia and serving as a rail gateway to Singapore. JB Sentral also serves as a future interchange point for the Johor Bahru–Singapore Rapid Transit System (RTS Link), which is expected to enhance cross-border rail connectivity between Malaysia and Singapore upon completion.

Subsequently, from 1 January 2026, selected ETS services were extended to provide direct north–south connectivity between Padang Besar and JB Sentral, linking the Thailand border in the north to the southern gateway of Malaysia, and enabling continuous electric train travel across Peninsular Malaysia.

The rail service is operated by KTM Intercity Division. It was previously operated by ETS Sendirian Berhad, a wholly owned subsidiary of Keretapi Tanah Melayu Berhad. The operational speed for this service is 140 km/h, with a maximum design speed of 160 km/h.

=== New Zealand ===
Advocacy group Greater Auckland proposed the Regional Rapid Rail initiative in 2017, including tilt trains with a maximum speed of 160 km/h. This network would link Auckland with Hamilton, Tauranga and Rotorua. In December 2018, the government of New Zealand committed funding to reintroducing a five-year trial rail service between Papakura in southern Auckland to Hamilton, starting in 2020.

=== Panama ===
China claimed to invest capitals into 160 km/h rail corridor, total length would be 491 km.

=== Philippines ===
The state-owned Philippine National Railways plans to rebuild its historic South Main Line from Manila to the Bicol Region in the southeastern tip of Luzon. The agency will build 639 km (397 mi) of track, with the main line itself leading to Matnog, Sorsogon and a spur line leading to Batangas City. It will be a standard-gauge railway served by Chinese-built diesel multiple units with a maximum speed of 160 km/h (100 mph) and an average speed of 107 km/h (66 mph) including stops. The project will start construction in mid-2020 and is set to open partially by 2022.

In January 2022, PNR general manager Junn Magno defined the agency's future high-speed rail projects to be electrified railways with a maximum speed of at least 200 km/h (120 mph). The high power costs and resulting expensive ticket prices resulted in the operation of high-speed rail in the country to be marked as infeasible. The agency then resorted to semi-high speed express trains for its new standard-gauge lines.

=== United States ===
This is a partial list of ongoing higher-speed rail projects from the East Coast to the West Coast.

Corridor / Segment	Length	Top speed	Avg speed	Current status	Note
Boston – Springfield, Massachusetts – Montreal, Canada	408 mi (657 km)	90 mph (145 km/h)	55 mph (89 km/h)	Feasibility study	A study of higher-speed rail options with top speeds of 90 mph (145 km/h) in 3 sections along the route.
New York City – Niagara Falls, New York	463 mi (745 km)	125 mph (200 km/h)	85 mph (137 km/h)	Tier 1 EIS	Fully electrified track, and straightened Hudson River route. See (Note: The study includes higher-speed rail alternatives with top speeds of 90 (145) (options A and B) and 110 mph (175 km/h). It also has high-speed rail options with top speeds of 125 (200), 160 (255) and 220 mph (355 km/h). As of March 2012, the Tier 1 EIS has eliminated the high-speed rail options, except for the 125 mph option. The numbers on the table represent the 125 mph alternative. The other alternatives are for non-electrified track with average speeds of 57 mph (92 km/h) (for 90A option), 61 (98) (for 90B option), and 63 (101) (for 110 option).)
Washington, DC – Richmond, Virginia	115 mi (185 km)	90 mph (145 km/h)		Tier 2 EIS	
Richmond – Newport News, Virginia		90 mph (145 km/h)		Tier 1 EIS	
Richmond – Norfolk, Virginia		110 mph (175 km/h)		Tier 1 EIS	
Richmond, VA – Raleigh, North Carolina	160 mi (257 km)	110 mph (175 km/h)	87 mph (140 km/h)	Tier 2 EIS	Top speeds from Richmond, VA, to south of Petersburg, Virginia, will be 90 mph (145 km/h) and changed to 110 mph (175 km/h) after that.
Raleigh – Charlotte, North Carolina	180 mi (290 km)	90 mph (145 km/h)		Construction	
Charlotte, NC – Atlanta	245 mi (394 km)	110 mph (175 km/h)		Tier 1 EIS	A 110 mph (175 km/h) option is considered along with 150 mph (240 km/h) high-speed rail.
Atlanta – Macon, Georgia – Jacksonville, Florida	408 / 368 mi (657 / 592 km)	90–100 / 130 mph (145–160 / 210 km/h)	77 / 94 mph (124 / 151 km/h)	Tier 1 EIS	See (Note: The study includes two main alternatives for higher-speed rail. The first alternative is called Shared Use with top speeds of 90–110 mph (145–175 km/h). The second alternative is called Hybrid High Performance with top speeds of 130 mph (210 km/h) (however it would be classified as high-speed rail). There are also high-speed rail alternatives in the same study with top speeds of 180–220+ mph (290–355+ km/h). The numbers on the table represent the first two alternatives. Federal Railroad Administration signed the Final EIS and Record of Decision in September 2017 to formally complete the Tier 1 EIS process for Atlanta to Chattanooga route.)
Atlanta – Chattanooga, Tennessee / Nashville, Tennessee – Louisville, Kentucky	489 / 428 mi (787 / 689 km)	90–100 / 130 mph (145–160 / 210 km/h)	72 / 85 mph (116 / 137 km/h)	Tier 1 EIS completed	See
Atlanta – Birmingham, Alabama	176 / 150 mi (283 / 241 km)	90–100 / 130 mph (145–160 / 210 km/h)	64 / 90 mph (103 / 145 km/h)	Tier 1 EIS	See
Atlanta – Columbus, Georgia	116 mi (187 km)	79–110 mph (125–175 km/h)	60 mph (97 km/h)	Feasibility Study	Higher-speed rail was one of the 3 alternatives in the feasibility study completed in 2014. Funding is not yet available to begin Tier 1 EIS phase.
Columbus, Ohio – Fort Wayne, Indiana – Chicago	300 mi (483 km)	110 mph (175 km/h)		Feasibility Study	Initial operating speeds up to 110 mph (175 km/h). Study funded by local governments and organizations, not by state governments.
Ann Arbor, Michigan – Traverse City, Michigan	250 mi (402 km)	90–110 mph (145–175 km/h)		Feasibility Study	Three alternatives with 2 higher-speed rail alternatives at top speeds of 90 mph (145 km/h) and 110 mph (175 km/h)
Kalamazoo, Michigan – Albion, Michigan	45 mi (72 km)	110 mph (175 km/h)		Operation starts 25 May 2021	
Chicago – Milwaukee	86 mi (138 km)	90 mph (145 km/h)	59 mph (95 km/h)	Environmental Assessment	The top speeds of 90 mph (145 km/h) is one of the alternatives under consideration.
Chicago – Omaha, Nebraska (via Iowa)	474–516 mi (763–830 km)	110 mph (175 km/h)		Tier 1 EIS	
Minneapolis – Duluth, Minnesota	152 mi (245 km)	90 mph (145 km/h)		Environmental Assessment completed	Known as Northern Lights Express, received Finding Of No Significant Impact on Tier 2 Environmental Assessment in February 2018, and cleared to seek federal funding for design and construction.
St. Louis – Kansas City, Missouri	283 mi (455 km)	90 mph (145 km/h)		Construction	New sidings between Jefferson City and Lee's Summit for 90 mph (145 km/h) service
Oklahoma City – San Antonio	850 mi (1,368 km)	110 mph (175 km/h)		Feasibility Study	See (Note: The study includes higher-speed rail up to 110 mph (175 km/h) and high-speed rail of 150+ mph (240+ km/h) options.)
Dallas/Fort Worth – Houston	239 mi (385 km)	110 mph (175 km/h)		Feasibility Study	See
Phoenix – Tucson, Arizona	120 mi (193 km)	125 mph (200 km/h)	66 mph (106 km/h)	Tier 1 EIS completed	Three alternatives finalized by Arizona Department of Transportation. The Yellow Corridor Alternative was selected as the preferred alternative at the completion of Tier 1 EIS.

==== Proposed routes ====
In addition to ongoing projects, there are proposed routes that have not reached the feasibility study stage yet. In Pennsylvania, a rail advocacy group started fund raising efforts in 2014 to obtain $25,000 for a preliminary study and additional $100,000 for feasibility study of the route from Erie to Pittsburgh. The proposal is for 110 mph (175 km/h) express train services to directly link the two cities. An alternative is to have intermediate stops in Ohio cities including Ashtabula, Warren, and Youngstown before heading back to New Castle, Pennsylvania.

In Ohio, a rail advocacy group works with local political leaders in Ohio, Indiana and Illinois to consider a higher-speed rail line from Cincinnati to Chicago. This is in response to another advocacy group in Indiana that gained funding for the Columbus, Ohio – Fort Wayne – Chicago route that is already in feasibility study stage. The group persuaded the Hamilton County government in Ohio to advocate for the study. The county commissioners unanimously voted in September 2014 to pursue a feasibility study. As a possible route that goes through the states of Kentucky and Indiana, the county expects that Ohio-Kentucky-Indiana Regional Council of Governments will help fund a feasibility study.

In Michigan, a feasibility study sponsored by an environmental group is in progress for a new rail line between Detroit and Grand Rapids. The proposal is to have trains running at speeds between 79 and 110 mph (127 and 177 km/h). The state transportation department is interested in the study but is not ready to move beyond this study.

In Texas, the East Texas Corridor Council proposed a higher-speed rail route between Longview and Dallas. The trains will operate at speeds of 80 mph (130 km/h) and 110 mph (175 km/h).

=== Vietnam ===
In 2018, Vietnam planned to build a higher-speed rail line in the northern part of the country to link between Haiphong, Hanoi, and Lào Cai which is then connected to China. The 391-kilometre (243 mi) line will run parallel to the existing regular speed railway. The top speeds for the new services will be up to 160 km/h (100 mph).

== See also ==
- High-speed rail
