= Haimen railway station =

Railway station in Haimen, Jiangsu

Haimen 海门

General information
- Location: Haimen District, Nantong, Jiangsu; China
- Coordinates: 31.9279°N 121.1785°E
- Line(s): Nanjing–Qidong railway
- Platforms: 2

History
- Opened: 5 January 2019

Haimen railway station (Chinese: 海门站) is a railway station in Haimen District, Nantong, Jiangsu, China. Situated north of the urban core of Haimen, it is an intermediate station on the Nanjing–Qidong railway. It was opened on 5 January 2019.

== Services ==
The initial service level was three trains to Nantong and three to Qidong per day. Provision has since improved. With the opening of the Nantong–Shanghai railway in July 2020, direct services to Shanghai Hongqiao and Hangzhou South were introduced.

Preceding station	China Railway High-speed	Following station
Nantong towards Nanjing	Nanjing–Qidong railway	Qidong Terminus
