= Nantong railway station =

Railway station in Nantong, Jiangsu

Nantong 南通
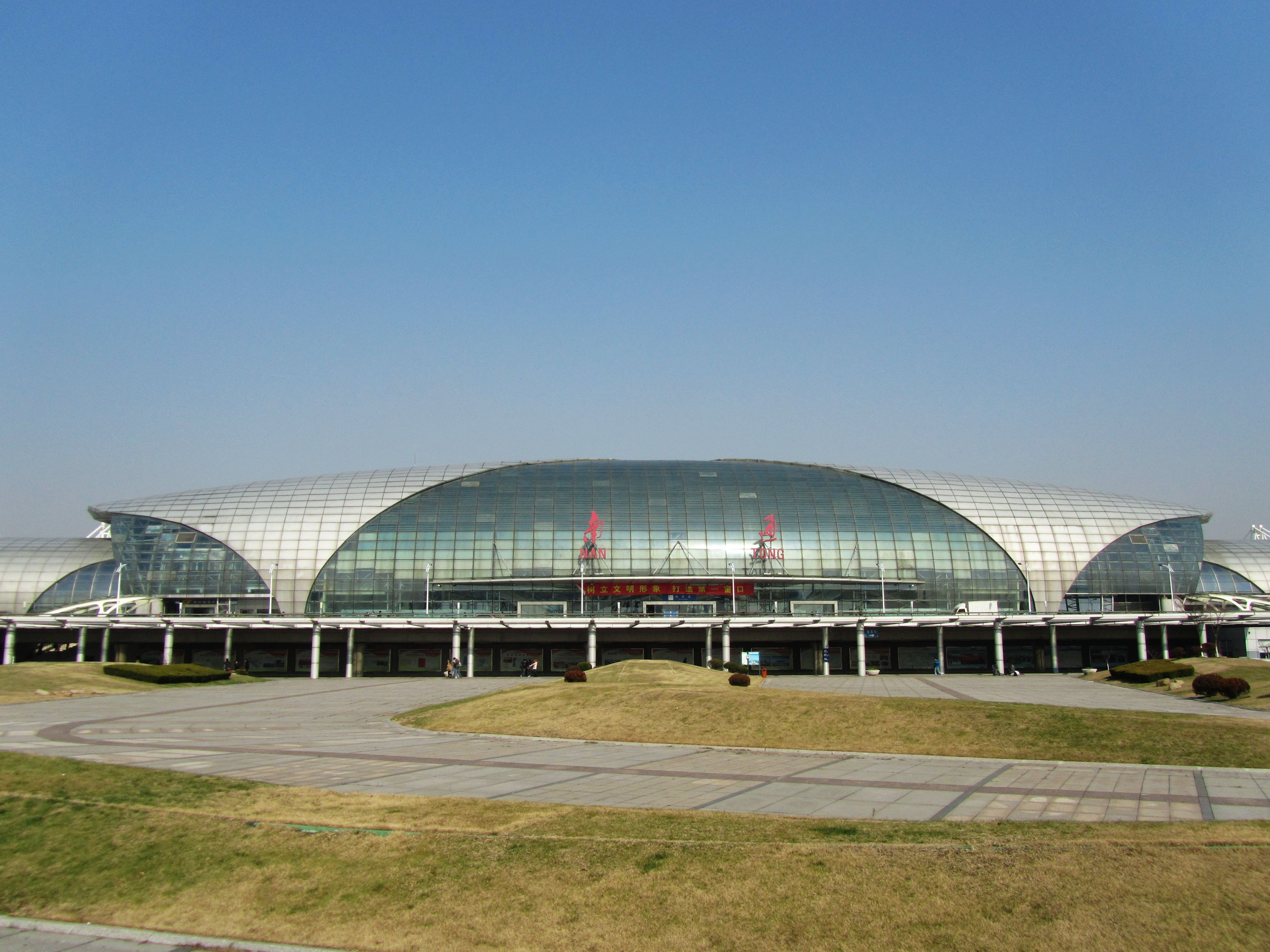

General information
- Location: Chongchuan District, Nantong, Jiangsu; China
- Coordinates: 32.070195°N 120.855958°E
- Line: Nanjing–Qidong railway
- Connections: 2

Other information
- Station code: TMIS code: 19124; Telegraph code: NUH; Pinyin code: NTO

History
- Opened: July 2004
Location

Nantong railway station (Chinese: 南通站) is a railway station in Chongchuan District, Nantong, Jiangsu, China. It is an intermediate station on the Nanjing–Qidong railway and is also connected to the Shanghai–Nantong railway and the Yancheng–Nantong high-speed railway via a junction.

== History ==
The station opened in July 2004. In 2006, the station was demolished and rebuilt.

== See also ==
- Nantong West railway station

Preceding station	China Railway High-speed	Following station
Rugao towards Nanjing	Nanjing–Qidong railway	Haimen towards Qidong
