= Four-quadrant gate =

Level crossing protective system with four barriers

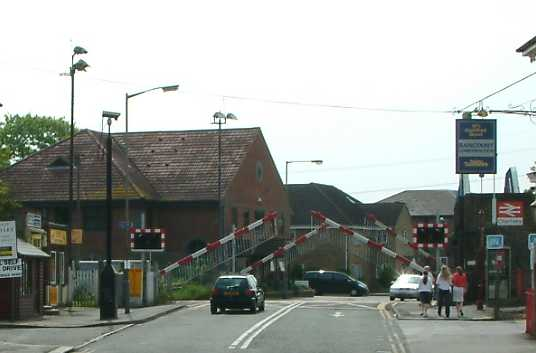
A level crossing with manually-controlled full barriers at Chertsey, England. The barriers are rising.

A four-quadrant gate or full-barrier equipment is a type of boom barrier gate protecting a grade crossing. It has a gate mechanism on both sides of the tracks for both directions of automotive traffic. The exit gates blocking the road leading away from the tracks are equipped with a delay, and begin their descent to their horizontal position several seconds after the entrance gates do, so as to avoid trapping highway vehicles on the crossing. In the United Kingdom, the exit-side barriers do not lower until the entrance-side barriers have lowered.

Many people consider four-quadrant gates to be safer than two-quadrant gates because they prevent drivers from illegally and dangerously driving their vehicles around lowered gates, in an attempt to pass before the train does. However, these gates are only safer if there is a way of ensuring that the crossing is clear before clearing the train driver's signals and allowing them to pass, as is always the case in the United Kingdom. As a result, the barriers are lowered for long periods before the train arrives, providing enough time that the train can be stopped if the crossing is obstructed.

In the United Kingdom, such crossings are categorised as manually-controlled barriers (MCB) because they are almost always controlled from a signal box or centre. Some are known as MCB-CCTV level crossings, where they are supervised by video link to the signal box from which they are remotely controlled. The gates can also be operated automatically, as long as the crossing is still checked for obstruction with a suitable detection technology.

The first four-quadrant gate in the United States was installed in 1952. They have become common for new installations and replacements since. Unlike the UK, many are automated by the rail line's signal system. The first quad gate installation in the country with sensors to detect vehicles stopped in the tracks was installed in Groton, Connecticut in 1998. Eight of the eleven remaining grade crossings on the Northeast Corridor now have such setups.

In American English, "gates" are used to describe level crossing barriers, as there are no longer traditional, opening gates. In British English, "barriers" refers to level crossing barriers, as some crossings still have actual gates.
