= Nanjing–Qidong railway =

Railway line in China

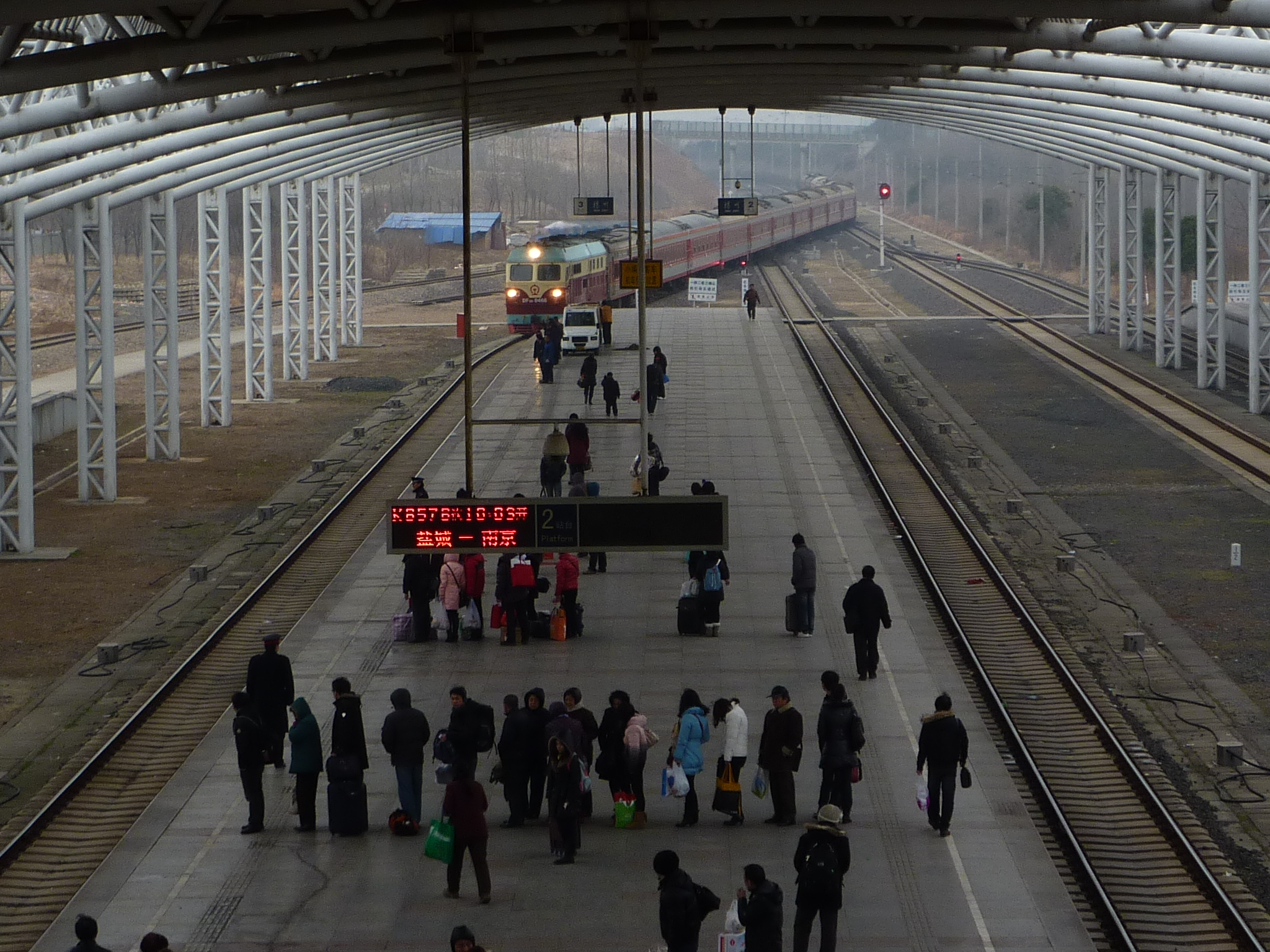
- A train arrives at Yangzhou railway station

Overview
- Other name: Ningqi railway
- Native name: 南京–启东铁路
- Status: Operating
- Locale: Jiangsu, People's Republic of China
- Termini: Nanjing railway station; Qidong railway station

Service
- Type: Higher-speed rail

History
- Opened: July 2005

Technical
- Line length: 351 kilometres (218 mi)
- Track gauge: 1,435 mm (4 ft 8 1/2 in) standard gauge
- Operating speed: 200 km/h

The Nanjing–Qidong railway (simplified Chinese: 南京–启东铁路; traditional Chinese: 南京–啟東鐵路; pinyin: Nánjīng–Qǐdōng tiělù), commonly referred to in short as the Ningqi railway (simplified Chinese: 宁启铁路; traditional Chinese: 寧啟鐵路; pinyin: Níngqǐ tiělù), is a higher-speed rail line in Jiangsu Province, China. Its common name is derived from Ning, the one-character abbreviation for Nanjing and Qi, which refers to Qidong, a county-level city of Nantong.

Until 2019, the railway only ran as far as east as Nantong East railway station. On January 5, 2019, the line was extended to Qidong and it is now 351 kilometres (218 mi) long. It runs along the northern bank of the Yangtze River, serving cities such as Yangzhou, Taizhou, and Hai'an. Passenger service was formerly operated between Nanjing railway station and Nantong railway station only. A frequent service is now operated on the whole route from Nanjing to Qidong.

== History ==
Planning for a railway along the north bank of the Yangtze River began as early as 1958. In 1977, the government of Jiangsu province designated the railway from Nanjing to Nantong as a project for completion within the next 10 years. Due to funding shortage and disagreement over route, the project was not built for 20 years. The project was revived in the late 1990s with the onset of construction on the Xinyi–Changxing railway, which was the first railway to be built in Jiangsu province north of the Yangtze River. In 2001, the Ministry of Railways approved plans for the Ningqi railway, and construction was built in two phases. The Nanjing to Hai'an section was built from March 1, 2002, to December 2003. The Haian to Yangzhou and Nantong sections were completed by July 2005.

A major upgrade project on the Nanjing–Qidong railway was completed on December 20, 2015. This involved the electrification of the railway line and building a second track. This was expected to halve the travel time from Nantong to Nanjing from the previous 3 hours 50 min to 1 hour 50 min. The electrification is designed to permit operation of double-stack container trains but no such services are currently being operated. EMU trains entered trial operation on May 6, 2016 and started revenue service from May 15, 2016.

Passenger service on an eastern single-track extension to Qidong (via Haimen) began on 5 January 2019. A further freight-only extension north towards Lusigang was also constructed.

Plans were approved in 2012 for a cross-river connection from Nantong to the Shanghai metropolitan area (the Shanghai–Nantong railway). It connects to the Nanjing–Qidong railway at Zhaodian station (planning name: Pingdong) on the northwestern outskirts of Nantong's urban core. Construction work on the Hutong Yangtze River bridge started on March 1, 2014. The line was expected to open at the end of 2018, but it was opened on July 1, 2020.
