= Bar gate =

Bar that is used to block a road or passageway

Animation of level crossing booms lowering in Queensland, Australia.

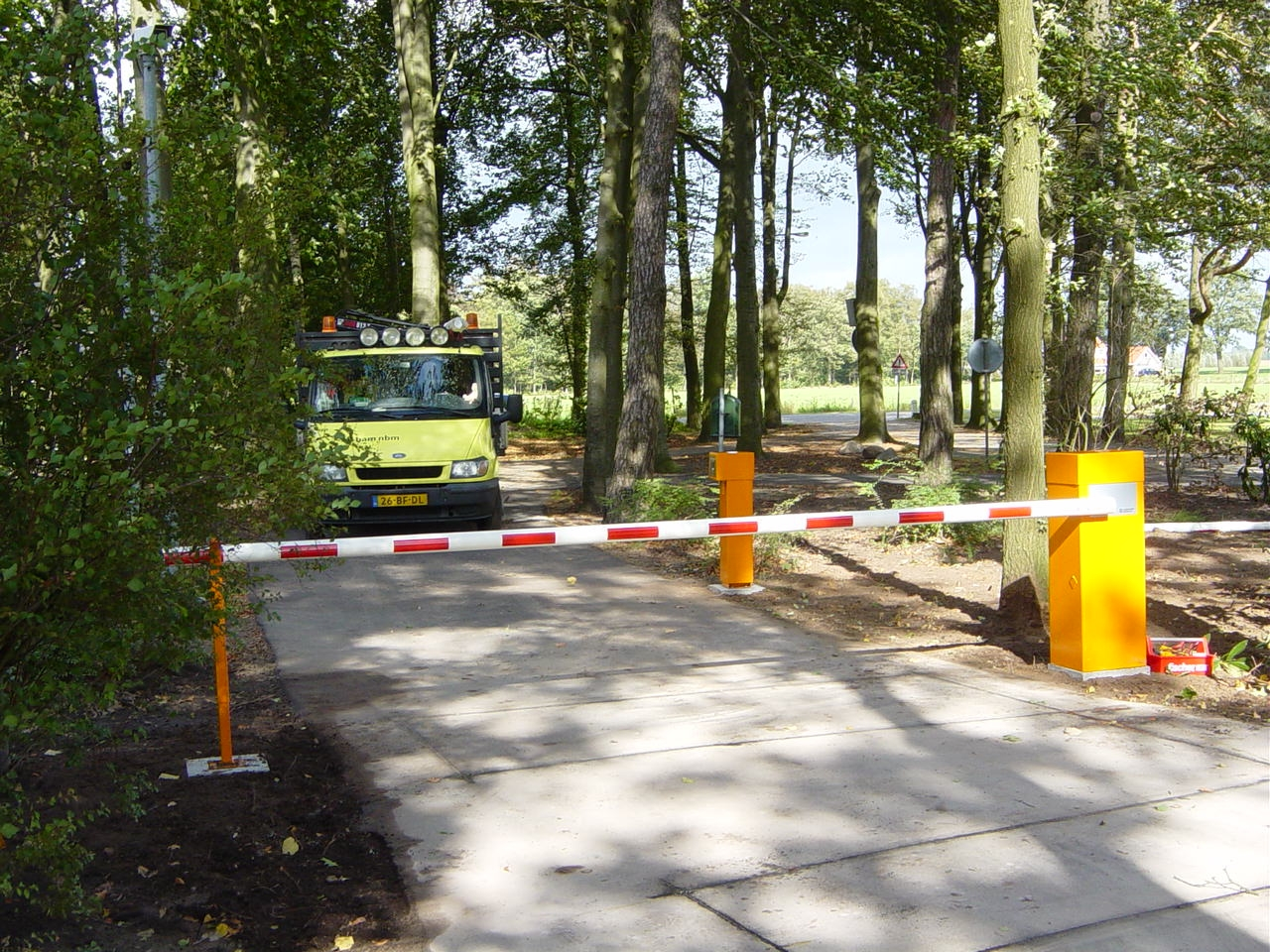
A bar gate in the Netherlands.

A bar (post, pole, beam, or boom gate, also known as a boom or a boom barrier) is a beam or bar on a pivot used as a gate. The boom is lowered to block vehicular or pedestrian access through a controlled point or raised to permit such traffic. Typically, the bar has a 90° range of motion with a vertical raised resting position and a horizontal lowered resting position. Bar gates, especially manually operated ones, are often counterweighted to allow easier manual control. Bar gates are frequently paired end to end or closely offset to block traffic in both directions. Some bar gates also have a second arm which hangs 30 to 40 cm below the upper arm when lowered to increase approach visibility. This underbar typically hangs on links, so it lies flat with the main bar as the barrier is raised. Some barriers also feature a pivot roughly half way, where as the barrier is raised, the outermost half remains horizontal, with the barrier resembling an upside-down L (or gamma) when raised.

== Automatic bar gates ==
There are various technologies for an automatic bar gate. One of them is electromechanical, which is widely used due to its reliability. The other technologies are often manufacturer specific. These electromechanical devices come with 24-volt direct-current drive units which can run continuously without generating heat, so electromechanical bar gates can be operated continuously and in an intensive duty cycle.

An automatic bar gate can be operated through:

- Push button
- Key Selector
- Remote control
- Radio-frequency identification (RFID) tags / RFID reader
- Loop detectors
- Optoelectronic sensors
- Automatic Number Plate Recognition Systems
- Interlocking System with a parking management system
- Bluetooth Access Control – Allows users to open the gate via a mobile app or paired Bluetooth device.
- Biometric Access (Fingerprint/Face Recognition) – Enhances security by granting access based on biometric authentication.
- Time-Based Access Control – Automatically opens or restricts gate access based on pre-set schedules.

== Usage ==
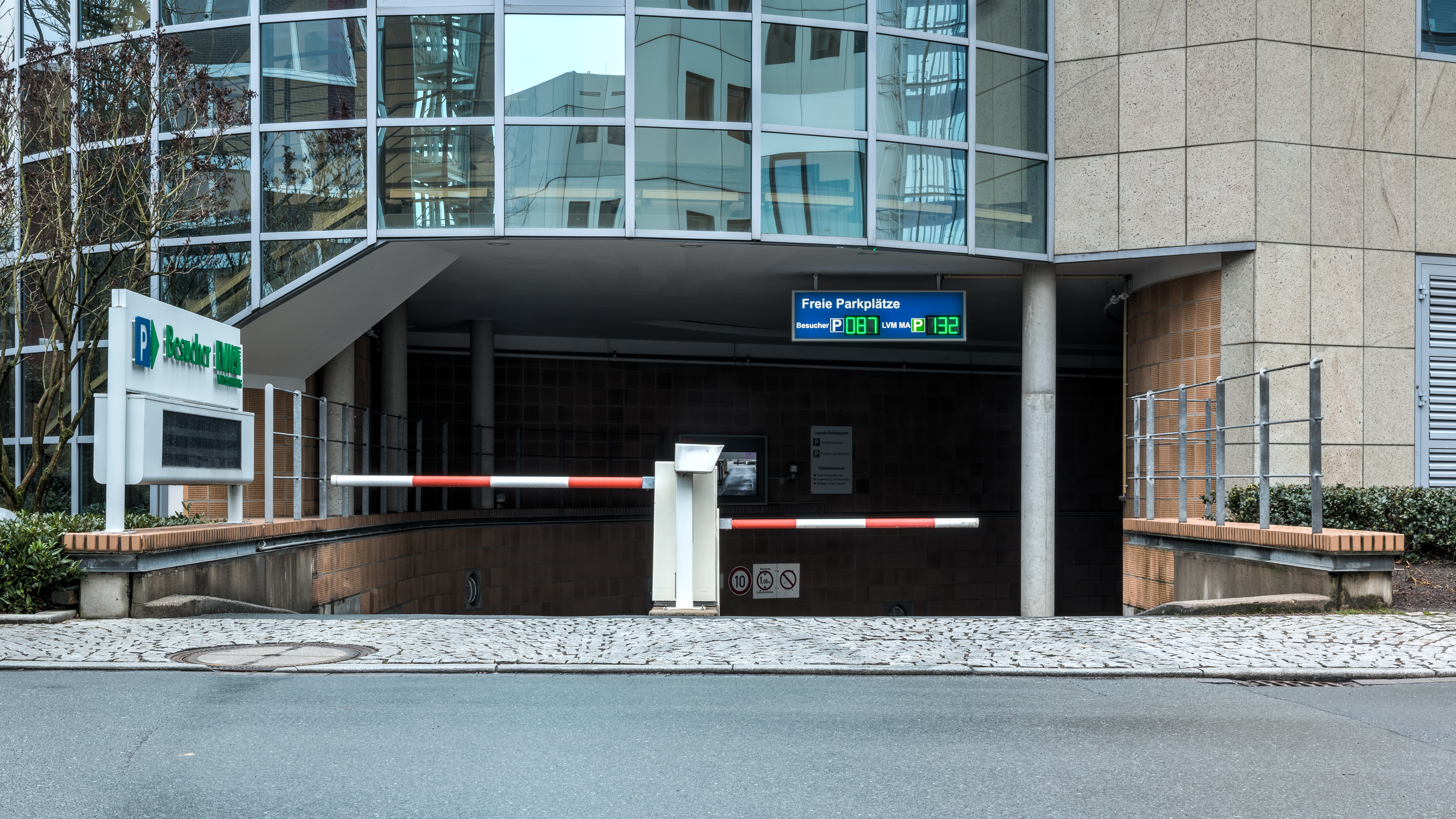
Bar gates at the entrance and exit of a parking garage in Münster, Germany

Bar gates are typically found at level crossings, drawbridges, parking facilities, checkpoints and entrances to restricted areas. They are also the usual method for controlling passage through toll booths, and can also be found on some highway entrance ramps which are automatically controlled to drop to restrict traffic in the event of accident cleanup or road closures without the need to dispatch road workers or law enforcement to use a vehicle to block the way. Some bar gates are automatic and powered; others are manually operated. Manual gates are sometimes hung in the manner of a normal gate (i.e. hinged horizontally). In some places, bar gates are installed across suburban streets as a traffic calming measure, preventing through traffic, while allowing authorised vehicles such as emergency services and buses to take advantage of the shorter and more direct route.

== See also ==
- Four-quadrant gate
- Toll collection technology
