= Qidong railway station (Jiangsu) =

Railway station in Qidong, Jiangsu

Qidong 启东

General information
- Location: Qidong, Nantong, Jiangsu; China
- Coordinates: 31.8589°N 121.6408°E
- Line(s): Nanjing–Qidong railway

History
- Opened: January 5, 2019

Qidong railway station (Chinese: 启东站) is a railway station in Qidong, Nantong, Jiangsu, China. Situated north of the urban core of Qidong, it is the eastern terminus for passenger operations on the Nanjing–Qidong railway. It was opened on 5 January 2019.

== Services ==
The initial service level was three arrivals and three departures per day. Provision has since improved. With the opening of the Nantong–Shanghai railway in July 2020, direct services to Shanghai Hongqiao and Hangzhou South were introduced.

Preceding station	China Railway High-speed	Following station
Haimen towards Nanjing	Nanjing–Qidong railway	Terminus
