= Cycling at the 2019 Pan American Games – Women's road race =

Women's road race at the 2019 Pan American Games
- Venue: Circuito San Miguel
- Dates: August 10
- Competitors: 36 from 16 nations
- Winning time: 2:19:49

Medalists
Gold medal	Arlenis Sierra	Cuba
Silver medal	Teniel Campbell	Trinidad and Tobago
Bronze medal	Lizbeth Salazar	Mexico

The women's road race competition of the cycling events at the 2019 Pan American Games was held on August 10 at the Circuito San Miguel.

== Schedule ==
Date	Time	Round
August 10, 2019	9:00	Final

== Results ==
36 riders from 16 countries was started

Rank	Rider	Nation	Time
1st place, gold medalist(s)	Arlenis Sierra	Cuba	2:19:49
2nd place, silver medalist(s)	Teniel Campbell	Trinidad and Tobago	2:19:50
3rd place, bronze medalist(s)	Lizbeth Salazar	Mexico	2:19:50
4	Denisse Ahumada	Chile	2:19:50
5	Lina Hernández	Colombia	2:19:50
6	Milena Salcedo	Colombia	2:19:51
7	Wilmarys Moreno	Venezuela	2:19:51
8	Fabiana Granizal	Uruguay	2:19:51
9	Yumari González	Cuba	2:19:52
10	Caitlin Conyers	Bermuda	2:19:52
11	Anany Muñoz	Chile	26:53.73
12	Iraida García	Cuba	2:19:53
13	Jessica Parra	Colombia	2:19:53
14	Jasmin Soto	Guatemala	2:19:53
15	Lilibeth Chacón	Venezuela	2:19:53
16	Fernanda Yapura	Argentina	2:19:53
17	Aranza Villalón	Chile	2:19:53
18	Ariadna Gutiérrez	Mexico	2:19:54
19	Miriam Brouwer	Canada	2:19:54
20	Miryam Núñez	Ecuador	2:19:54
21	Alexi Costa	Trinidad and Tobago	2:20:24
22	Jessica Bonilla	Mexico	2:20:24
23	Leslye Ojeda	Ecuador	2:20:33
24	Lisa Groothuesheidkamp	Aruba	2:20:33
25	Fiorella Malaspina	Argentina	2:20:34
26	Angie Paulett	Peru	2:20:34
27	Angie González	Venezuela	2:20:34
28	Maggie Coles-Lyster	Canada	2:20:35
29	Nicole Mitchell	Bermuda	2:21:16
30	Dayana Aguilar	Ecuador	2:21:16
31	Maribel Aguirre	Argentina	2:21:17
32	Luddy Fernández	Peru	2:21:21
33	Erin Attwell	Canada	2:23:07
34	Cinthya Dávila	Peru	2:26:25
35	Juana Fernández	Dominican Republic	2:32:03
36	Micaela Sarabia	Bolivia	2:32:47
