= Cycling at the 2019 Pan American Games – Women's madison =

Women's madison at the 2019 Pan American Games
- Venue: Velodrome
- Dates: August 4
- Competitors: 16 from 8 nations
- Winning points: 46

Medalists
Gold medal	Kimberly Geist; Christina Birch	United States
Silver medal	Miriam Brouwer; Maggie Coles-Lyster	Canada
Bronze medal	Lizbeth Salazar; Jessica Bonilla	Mexico

The women's madison competition of the cycling events at the 2019 Pan American Games was held on August 4 at the Velodrome.

== Schedule ==
Date	Time	Round
August 4, 2019	11:42	Final

== Results ==
The final classification is determined in the medal finals.

Rank	Name	Nation	Laps points	Sprint points	Total points
1st place, gold medalist(s)	Kimberly Geist; Christina Birch	United States		46	46
2nd place, silver medalist(s)	Miriam Brouwer; Maggie Coles-Lyster	Canada		35	35
3rd place, bronze medalist(s)	Lizbeth Salazar; Jessica Bonilla	Mexico		35	35
4	Lina Rojas; Milena Salcedo	Colombia		14	14
5	Daniela Lionço; Wellyda Rodrigues	Brazil		11	11
6	Jeidi Pradera; Idaris Cervante	Cuba	–20	2	–18
7	Aranza Villalón; Paula Villalón	Chile	–40	0	–40
	Ariadna Herrera; Dayana Aguilar	Ecuador	–20	0	DNF
	Alexi Costa; Teniel Campbell	Trinidad and Tobago			DNS
