= Cycling at the 2019 Pan American Games – Women's team pursuit =

Women's team pursuit at the 2019 Pan American Games
- Venue: Velodrome
- Dates: August 1–2
- Competitors: 32 from 8 nations
- Winning time: 4:24.099

Medalists
Gold medal	Christina Birch; Chloé Dygert; Kimberly Geist; Lily Williams	United States
Silver medal	Maggie Coles-Lyster; Erin Attwell; Miriam Brouwer; Laurie Jussaume	Canada
Bronze medal	Lina Hernández; Jessica Parra; Lina Rojas; Milena Salcedo	Colombia

The women's team pursuit competition of the cycling events at the 2019 Pan American Games was held on August 1 and August 2 at the Velodrome.

== Records ==
Prior to this competition, the existing world and Games records were as follows:

World record	Great Britain	4:10.236	Rio de Janeiro, Brazil	13 August 2016
Games record	Canada	4:19.664	Toronto, Canada	17 July 2015

== Schedule ==
Date	Time	Round
August 1, 2019	11:05	Qualification
August 1, 2019	18:28	First Round
August 2, 2019	18:19	Finals

== Results ==
=== Qualification ===
The eight teams recording the best times in the qualifying round will be matched in the First round as follows: The 6th fastest team against the 7th fastest team. The 5th fastest team against the 8th fastest team. The 2nd fastest team against the 3rd fastest team. The fastest team against the 4th fastest team.

Rank	Nation	Name	Time	Notes
1	United States	Christina Birch; Chloé Dygert; Kimberly Geist; Lily Williams	4:28.186	
2	Canada	Maggie Coles-Lyster; Erin Attwell; Miriam Brouwer; Laurie Jussaume	4:29.145	
3	Mexico	Lizbeth Salazar; Sofía Arreola; Jessica Bonilla; Yuli Verdugo	4:37.8793	
4	Colombia	Lina Hernández; Jessica Parra; Lina Rojas; Milena Salcedo	4:39.523	
5	Chile	Aranza Villalón; Denisse Ahumada; Victoria Martínez; Paula Villalón	4:46.776	
6	Cuba	Idaris Cervante; Iraida García; Yumari González; Jeidi Pradera	4:51.742	
7	Ecuador	Dayana Aguilar; Ariadna Herrera; Miryam Núñez; Leslye Ojeda	5:04.460	
8	Peru	Angie Paulett; Cinthya Dávila; Luddy Fernández; Romina Medrano	5:09.577	

=== First round ===
The winners of heats 3 and 4 in the First round ride the final for the gold and silver medals. The remaining six teams will be ranked by their times in the First round and will be paired as follows: The two fastest teams ride the final for the bronze medal.

Rank	Heat	Nation	Name	Time	Notes
1	4	United States	Christina Birch; Chloé Dygert; Kimberly Geist; Lily Williams	4:28.186	QG
2	3	Canada	Maggie Coles-Lyster; Erin Attwell; Miriam Brouwer; Laurie Jussaume	4:29.145	QG
3	3	Mexico	Lizbeth Salazar; Sofía Arreola; Jessica Bonilla; Yuli Verdugo	4:36.673	QB
4	3	Colombia	Lina Hernández; Jessica Parra; Lina Rojas; Milena Salcedo	4:40.046	QB
5	2	Chile	Aranza Villalón; Denisse Ahumada; Victoria Martínez; Paula Villalón	4:46.886	
6	1	Cuba	Idaris Cervante; Iraida García; Yumari González; Jeidi Pradera	4:47.309	
7	1	Ecuador	Dayana Aguilar; Ariadna Herrera; Miryam Núñez; Leslye Ojeda	4:58.333	
8	2	Peru	Angie Paulett; Cinthya Dávila; Luddy Fernández; Romina Medrano	5:11.653	

=== Finals ===
The final classification is determined in the medal finals.

Rank	Nation	Name	Time	Notes
Gold medal final
1st place, gold medalist(s)	United States	Christina Birch; Chloé Dygert; Kimberly Geist; Lily Williams	4:24.099	
2nd place, silver medalist(s)	Canada	Maggie Coles-Lyster; Erin Attwell; Miriam Brouwer; Laurie Jussaume	4:27.799	
Bronze medal final
3rd place, bronze medalist(s)	Colombia	Lina Hernández; Jessica Parra; Lina Rojas; Milena Salcedo	4:36.256	
4	Mexico	Lizbeth Salazar; Sofía Arreola; Jessica Bonilla; Yuli Verdugo	OVL	
