= Cycling at the 2019 Pan American Games – Women's omnium =

Women's omnium at the 2019 Pan American Games
- Venue: Velodrome
- Dates: August 3
- Competitors: 17 from 17 nations
- Winning points: 198

Medalists
Gold medal	Jennifer Valente	United States
Silver medal	Lizbeth Salazar	Mexico
Bronze medal	Arlenis Sierra	Cuba

The women's omnium competition of the cycling events at the 2019 Pan American Games was held on August 3 at the Velodrome.

== Schedule ==
Date	Time	Round
August 3, 2019	12:19	Scratch
August 3, 2019	13:04	Tempo Race
August 3, 2019	18:18	Elimination
August 3, 2019	19:38	Points Race

== Results ==
=== Scratch ===
The race was started at 12:19.

Rank	Name	Nation	Laps down	Event points
1	Aranza Villalón	Chile		40
2	Maribel Aguirre	Argentina		38
3	Jennifer Valente	United States		36
4	Amber Joseph	Barbados		34
5	Maggie Coles-Lyster	Canada		32
6	Lizbeth Salazar	Mexico		30
7	Wellyda Rodrigues	Brazil		28
8	Alexi Costa	Trinidad and Tobago		26
9	Angie González	Venezuela		24
10	Lina Hernández	Colombia		22
11	Arlenis Sierra	Cuba		20
12	Angie Paulett	Peru		18
13	Jasmin Soto	Guatemala		16
14	Fabiana Granizal	Uruguay		14
15	Dayana Aguilar	Ecuador		12
16	Micaela Sarabia	Bolivia		10
17	Juana Fernández	Dominican Republic	−1	8

=== Tempo Race ===
The race was started at 13:04.

Rank	Name	Nation	Lap points	Total points	Event points
1	Jennifer Valente	United States	20	33	40
2	Lizbeth Salazar	Mexico	20	26	38
3	Lina Hernández	Colombia	20	20	36
4	Aranza Villalón	Chile		3	34
5	Arlenis Sierra	Cuba		2	32
6	Amber Joseph	Barbados		1	30
7	Maggie Coles-Lyster	Canada		1	28
8	Angie Paulett	Peru		0	26
9	Alexi Costa	Trinidad and Tobago		0	24
10	Maribel Aguirre	Argentina		0	22
11	Jasmin Soto	Guatemala		0	20
12	Dayana Aguilar	Ecuador		0	18
13	Wellyda Rodrigues	Brazil		0	16
14	Angie González	Venezuela		0	14
15	Fabiana Granizal	Uruguay		0	12
16	Micaela Sarabia	Bolivia	−40	−40	10
17	Juana Fernández	Dominican Republic	−40	−40	8

=== Elimination ===
The race was started at 18:18.

Rank	Name	Nation	Event points
1	Jennifer Valente	United States	40
2	Lizbeth Salazar	Mexico	38
3	Lina Hernández	Colombia	36
4	Amber Joseph	Barbados	34
5	Arlenis Sierra	Cuba	32
6	Maggie Coles-Lyster	Canada	30
7	Wellyda Rodrigues	Brazil	28
8	Alexi Costa	Trinidad and Tobago	26
9	Dayana Aguilar	Ecuador	24
10	Fabiana Granizal	Uruguay	22
11	Angie González	Venezuela	20
12	Angie Paulett	Peru	18
13	Maribel Aguirre	Argentina	16
14	Aranza Villalón	Chile	14
15	Jasmin Soto	Guatemala	12
16	Juana Fernández	Dominican Republic	10
17	Micaela Sarabia	Bolivia	8

=== Points Race ===
The race was started at 19:38.

Rank	Name	Nation	Lap points	Event points
1	Jennifer Valente	United States	40	82
2	Arlenis Sierra	Cuba	40	56
3	Lizbeth Salazar	Mexico	40	56
4	Aranza Villalón	Chile	20	23
5	Lina Hernández	Colombia	20	21
6	Amber Joseph	Barbados		12
7	Maggie Coles-Lyster	Canada		5
8	Wellyda Rodrigues	Brazil		2
9	Jasmin Soto	Guatemala		2
10	Alexi Costa	Trinidad and Tobago		0
11	Angie Paulett	Peru		0
12	Maribel Aguirre	Argentina		0
13	Angie González	Venezuela		0
14	Dayana Aguilar	Ecuador	−20	−20
15	Fabiana Granizal	Uruguay	−20	−20
DNF	Micaela Sarabia	Bolivia		0
DNF	Juana Fernández	Dominican Republic		0

=== Final standings ===
The final classification is determined overall standings.

Rank	Name	Nation	Scratch	Tempo	Elimination	Points Race	Total
1st place, gold medalist(s)	Jennifer Valente	United States	36	40	40	82	198
2nd place, silver medalist(s)	Lizbeth Salazar	Mexico	30	38	38	56	162
3rd place, bronze medalist(s)	Arlenis Sierra	Cuba	20	32	32	56	140
4	Lina Hernández	Colombia	22	36	36	21	115
5	Aranza Villalón	Chile	40	34	14	23	111
6	Amber Joseph	Barbados	34	30	34	12	110
7	Maggie Coles-Lyster	Canada	32	28	30	5	95
8	Alexi Costa	Trinidad and Tobago	26	24	26	0	76
9	Maribel Aguirre	Argentina	38	22	16	0	76
10	Wellyda Rodrigues	Brazil	28	16	28	2	74
11	Angie Paulett	Peru	18	26	18	0	62
12	Angie González	Venezuela	24	14	20	0	58
13	Jasmin Soto	Guatemala	16	20	12	2	50
14	Dayana Aguilar	Ecuador	12	18	24	−20	34
15	Fabiana Granizal	Uruguay	14	12	22	−20	28
16	Micaela Sarabia	Bolivia	10	10	8	0	28
17	Juana Fernández	Dominican Republic	8	8	10	0	26
