= Colombia at the 2019 Pan American Games =

- IOC code: COL
- NOC: Colombian Olympic Committee
- Website: www.olimpicocol.co (in Spanish)

in Lima, Peru 26 July–11 August 2019
- Competitors: 349 in 13 sports
- Flag bearer: Yuberjen Martínez (opening)
- Medals Ranked 7th: Gold 27 Silver 24 Bronze 31 Total 82

Pan American Games appearances (overview)
- 1951; 1955; 1959; 1963; 1967; 1971; 1975; 1979; 1983; 1987; 1991; 1995; 1999; 2003; 2007; 2011; 2015; 2019; 2023; 2027

Colombia competed in the 2019 Pan American Games in Lima, Peru from July 26 to August 11, 2019.

The Colombian team consisted of 349 athletes, the largest in history.

During the opening ceremony of the games, boxer Yuberjen Martínez carried the flag of the country as part of the parade of nations.

== Medalists ==
The following Colombian competitors won medals at the games.

Medal	Name	Sport	Event	Date
Gold	Francisco Mosquera	Weightlifting	Men's 61 kg	July 27
Gold	Catalina Peláez; Miguel Ángel Rodríguez	Squash	Mixed doubles	July 28
Gold	Brayan Rodallegas	Weightlifting	Men's 81 kg	July 28
Gold	María Lobón	Weightlifting	Women's 59 kg	July 28
Gold	Miguel Trejos	Taekwondo	Men's 80 kg	July 29
Gold	Mercedes Pérez	Weightlifting	Women's 64 kg	July 29
Gold	Jhonatan Rivas	Weightlifting	Men's 96 kg	July 29
Gold	Clara Guerrero	Bowling	Women's singles	July 30
Gold	Ingrit Valencia	Boxing	Women's 51 kg	August 2
Gold	Martha Bayona	Cycling	Women's keirin	August 2
Gold	Sandra Arenas	Athletics	Women's 20 kilometres walk	August 4
Gold	Kevin Quintero	Cycling	Men's keirin	August 4
Gold	Daniel Restrepo	Diving	Men's 3 metre springboard	August 4
Gold	Giorgio Gómez	Surfing	Men's SUP surf	August 4
Gold	Izzi Gómez	Surfing	Women's SUP surf	August 4
Gold	Daniel Martínez	Cycling	Men's road time trial	August 7
Gold	Anthony Zambrano	Athletics	Men's 400 metres	August 8
Gold	Mariana Pajón	Cycling	Women's racing	August 9
Gold	Colombia women's national football team: Catalina Pérez; Stefany Castaño; Michell Lugo; Carolina Arias; Daniela Arias; Daniela Caracas; Isabella Echeverri; Natalia Gaitán; Manuela Vanegas; Jessica Caro; Daniela Montoya; Diana Ospina; Marcela Restrepo; Leicy Santos; Lady Andrade; Mayra Ramírez; Catalina Usme; Oriánica Velásquez	Football	Women's tournament	August 9
Gold	Pedro Causil	Roller sports	Men's 300 metres time-trial	August 9
Gold	Sara López	Archery	Women's individual compound	August 10
Silver	Miguel Ángel Rodríguez	Squash	Men's singles	July 27
Silver	Jhon Serna	Weightlifting	Men's 61 kg	July 27
Silver	Ana Segura	Weightlifting	Women's 49 kg	July 27
Silver	Luis Javier Mosquera	Weightlifting	Men's 73 kg	July 28
Silver	Yenny Sinisterra	Weightlifting	Women's 55 kg	July 28
Silver	Gloria Mosquera	Taekwondo	Women's +67 kg	July 29
Silver	Miguel Ángel Rodríguez; Andrés Herrera; Juan Camilo Vargas	Squash	Men's Team	July 31
Silver	Cristian Salcedo	Boxing	Men's +91 kg	August 1
Silver	Rubén Murillo; Kevin Quintero; Santiago Ramírez	Cycling	Men's team sprint	August 1
Silver	Yuberjen Martínez	Boxing	Men's 49 kg	August 2
Silver	Marvin Angarita; Bryan Gómez; Jordan Parra; Brayan Sánchez; Juan Arango	Cycling	Men's team pursuit	August 3
Silver	Martha Bayona	Cycling	Women's sprint	August 4
Silver	Dicther Toro	Wrestling	Men's Greco-Roman 60 kg	August 7
Silver	Geiny Pájaro	Roller sports	Women's 300 metres time-trial	August 9
Silver	Jackeline Rentería	Wrestling	Women's Freestyle 62 kg	August 9
Silver	Sebastian Franco; Mario Mercado	Racquetball	Men's team	August 10
Silver	Ana Rendón; Daniel Pineda	Archery	Mixed team recurve	August 11
Bronze	Angie Orjuela	Athletics	Women's marathon	July 27
Bronze	Manuel Otalora; Alfredo Quintana	Bowling	Men's doubles	July 27
Bronze	Andrea Ramírez	Taekwondo	Women's 49 kg	July 27
Bronze	Katherine Dumar	Taekwondo	Women's 67 kg	July 27
Bronze	Laura Tovar; María Tovar	Squash	Women's doubles	July 28
Bronze	Colombia women's national rugby sevens team: Nicole Acevedo; Isabel Romero; Carmen Ibarra; Daniela Alzate; Lina Pedroza; Catalina Arango; María Arzuaga; Leidy Soto; Camila Lopera; Laura Mejía; Sharon Acevado; Valentina Tapias	Rugby sevens	Women's tournament	July 28
Bronze	María Rodríguez	Bowling	Women's singles	July 30
Bronze	Andrés Martínez	Gymnastics	Men's floor	July 30
Bronze	Carlos Calvo	Gymnastics	Men's pommel horse	July 30
Bronze	Yeni Arias	Boxing	Women's 57 kg	July 30
Bronze	Catalina Peláez; Laura Tovar; María Tovar	Squash	Women's team	July 31
Bronze	Martha Bayona; Juliana Gaviria	Cycling	Women's team sprint	August 1
Bronze	Jannie Salcedo; Lina Rojas; Jessica Parra; Lina Hernández	Cycling	Women's team pursuit	August 2
Bronze	Kevin Quintero	Cycling	Men's sprint	August 3
Bronze	Brayan Sánchez; Juan Arango	Cycling	Men's madison	August 4
Bronze	Jhon Édison Rodríguez	Fencing	Men's épée	August 5
Bronze	Mario Mercado	Racquetball	Men's singles	August 6
Bronze	Adriana Riveros	Racquetball	Women's singles	August 6
Bronze	Jonathan Gómez	Swimming	Men's 200 metre butterfly	August 6
Bronze	Jair Cuero	Wrestling	Men's Greco-Roman 77 kg	August 7
Bronze	Martha Araújo	Athletics	Women's heptathlon	August 8
Bronze	Carolina Castillo	Wrestling	Women's Freestyle 50 kg	August 8
Bronze	Yadinis Amarís	Judo	Women's 57 kg	August 9
Bronze	Andrea Olaya	Wrestling	Women's Freestyle 76 kg	August 9
Bronze	Sara López; Daniel Muñoz	Archery	Mixed team compound	August 10
Bronze	Daniel Muñoz	Archery	Men's individual compound	August 10
Bronze	Carlos Izquierdo	Wrestling	Men's Freestyle 86 kg	August 10
Bronze	Valentina Acosta; Ana Rendón; Maira Sepúlveda	Archery	Women's team recurve	August 11

Medals by sport
Sport	1st place, gold medalist(s)	2nd place, silver medalist(s)	3rd place, bronze medalist(s)	Total
Weightlifting	5	4	0	9
Archery	1	1	3	5
Taekwondo	1	1	2	4
Squash	1	1	1	3
Bowling	1	0	2	3
Wrestling	0	2	4	6
Gymnastics	0	0	2	2
Athletics	0	0	1	1
Total	9	9	15	33

Medals by day
Day	Date	1st place, gold medalist(s)	2nd place, silver medalist(s)	3rd place, bronze medalist(s)	Total
1	July 27	1	3	4	8
2	July 28	3	2	1	6
3	July 29	3	1	0	4
4	July 30	1	0	3	4
5	July 31	0	0	0	0
6	August 1	0	0	0	0
7	August 2	0	0	0	0
8	August 3	0	0	0	0
9	August 4	0	0	0	0
10	August 5	0	0	0	0
11	August 6	0	0	0	0
12	August 7	0	0	0	0
13	August 8	0	0	0	0
14	August 9	0	0	0	0
15	August 10	1	1	2	4
16	August 11	0	0	1	1
Total		9	7	11	27

Medals by gender
Gender	1st place, gold medalist(s)	2nd place, silver medalist(s)	3rd place, bronze medalist(s)	Total
Female	3	3	5	11
Male	4	3	3	10
Mixed	1	0	0	1
Total	8	6	8	22

Multiple medalists
Name	Sport	1st place, gold medalist(s)	2nd place, silver medalist(s)	3rd place, bronze medalist(s)	Total
Miguel Ángel Rodríguez	Squash	1	1	0	2
Mario Mercado	Racquetball	0	1	1	2

-->

== Competitors ==
The following is the list of number of competitors (per gender) participating at the games per sport/discipline.

Sport	Men	Women	Total
Archery	4	4	8
Artistic swimming	—N/a	9	9
Badminton	0	1	1
Baseball	24	0	24
Basketball	0	12	12
Bodybuilding	1	1	2
Boxing	8	4	12
Bowling	2	2	4
Canoeing	1	2	3
Cycling	13	11	24
Diving	4	4	8
Equestrian	8	1	9
Fencing	7	6	13
Football	0	18	18
Golf	2	2	4
Gymnastics	1	1	2
Judo	5	5	10
Karate	7	4	11
Modern pentathlon	1	1	2
Racquetball	2	2	4
Roller sports	3	3	6
Rugby sevens	0	12	12
Sailing	3	0	3
Shooting	2	2	4
Squash	3	3	6
Surfing	1	1	2
Table tennis	1	3	4
Taekwondo	4	4	8
Tennis	3	3	6
Triathlon	2	2	4
Volleyball	0	14	14
Water skiing	3	3	6
Weightlifting	6	6	12
Wrestling	7	4	11
Total	128	150	278

== Archery ==
Men

Athlete	Event	Ranking round		Round of 32	Round of 16	Quarterfinal	Semifinal	Final / BM	
Athlete	Event	Score	Rank	Opposition Result	Opposition Result	Opposition Result	Opposition Result	Opposition Result	Rank
Daniel Pineda	Individual recurve	673	5º	Betancur (COL); W 6–2	Pila (COL); W 6–5	Duenas (CAN); L 2–6	Did not advance		
Andrés Pila	Individual recurve	659	12	Flossbach (GUA); W 7–1	Pineda (COL); L 5–6	Did not advance			
Daniel Betancur	Individual recurve	633	28	Pineda (COL); L 2–6	Did not advance				
Daniel Muñoz	Individual compound	706	4	—N/a	Bye	Nikolajuk (ARG); W 148–144	Gellenthien (USA); L 144–145	Bronze medal contest Alba (MEX); W 149–144	3rd place, bronze medalist(s)
Daniel Betancur; Andrés Pila; Daniel Pineda	Team recurve	1965	6	—N/a		Mexico; L 4–5	Did not advance		

Women

Athlete	Event	Ranking round		Round of 32	Round of 16	Quarterfinal	Semifinal	Final / BM	
Athlete	Event	Score	Rank	Opposition Result	Opposition Result	Opposition Result	Opposition Result	Opposition Result	Rank
Ana Rendón	Individual recurve	652	4	Cortez (ESA); W 6–2	Acosta (COL); W 7–3	Avitia (MEX); W 7–3	Valencia (MEX); L 0–6	Bronze medal contest Kaufhold (USA); L 0–6	4
Valentina Acosta	Individual recurve	625	13º	Santos (BRA); W 6–5	Rendón (COL); L 3–7	Did not advance			
Maira Sepúlveda	Individual recurve	586	26º	Barrett (CAN); W 6–4	Pellecer (GUA); L 2–6	Did not advance			
Sara López	Individual compound	708 PR	1	—N/a	Bye	Aliaga (PER); W 145–142	Pearce (USA); W 149–142	Becerra (MEX); W 146–142	1st place, gold medalist(s)
Valentina Acosta; Ana Rendón; Maira Sepúlveda	Team recurve	1863	3	—N/a		Cuba; W 6–2	United States; L 2–6	Bronze medal contest Brazil; W 5–1	3rd place, bronze medalist(s)

Mixed

Athlete	Event	Ranking round		Round of 16	Quarterfinal	Semifinal	Final / BM	
Athlete	Event	Score	Rank	Opposition Result	Opposition Result	Opposition Result	Opposition Result	Rank
Daniel Pineda; Ana Rendón	Team recurve	1325	3	Bye	Puentes / Rodríguez (CUB); W 5–1	Alvarado / Valencia (MEX); W 5–4	Ellison / Kaufhold (USA); L 3–5	2nd place, silver medalist(s)
Daniel Muñoz; Sara López	Team compound	1414	1	—N/a	Hermoza / Aliaga (PER); W 154–148	Nikolajuk / González (ARG); L 154–157	Bronze medal contest Brassaroto / Meleti (BRA); W 156–149	3rd place, bronze medalist(s)

== Artistic swimming ==
Athlete	Event	Technical swim		Free swim		Total	
Athlete	Event	Score	Rank	Score	Rank	Score	Rank
Estefanía Álvarez; Mónica Arango	Duet	79.2052	5	80.5667	5	159.7719	5
Estefanía Álvarez; Mónica Arango; Kerly Barrera; Jennifer Cerquera; Ingrid Cubillos; Juliana Jaramillo; Valentina Orozco; Sara Rodríguez; Jhoselyne Taborda	Team	77.9755	5	80.3333	5	158.3088	5

== Badminton ==
Colombia received a reallocated quota spot for a female athlete.

Women

Athlete	Event	Round of 64	Round of 32	Round of 16	Quarterfinals	Semifinals	Final	Rank
Athlete	Event	Opposition Result	Opposition Result	Opposition Result	Opposition Result	Opposition Result	Opposition Result	Rank
Juliana Giraldo	Singles	Bye	Sotomayor (GUA); L 8–21, 16–21	Did not advance				

== Baseball ==
Colombia qualified a men's team of 24 athletes by finishing in the top four at the 2019 Pan American Games Qualifier in Brazil.

Group B

	GP	W	L	RS	RA	DIFF
Canada	3	3	0	28	9	+19
Colombia	3	2	1	13	13	0
Cuba	3	1	2	17	14	+3
Argentina	3	0	3	2	24	−22

Qualified for the Super round

July 29; 10:05	Cuba	1–6	Colombia	Baseball Stadium, Lima; Attendance: 2,456
July 29; 10:05		Boxscore		Baseball Stadium, Lima; Attendance: 2,456

July 30; 15:05	Colombia	4–2	Argentina	Baseball Stadium, Lima; Attendance: 1,560
July 30; 15:05		Boxscore		Baseball Stadium, Lima; Attendance: 1,560

August 1; 10:05	Colombia	3–10	Canada	Baseball Stadium, Lima; Attendance: N/A
August 1; 10:05		Boxscore		Baseball Stadium, Lima; Attendance: N/A

Super round

	GP	W	L	RS	RA	DIFF
Puerto Rico	3	3	0	17	9	+8
Canada	3	2	1	25	11	+14
Colombia	3	1	2	15	13	+2
Nicaragua	3	0	3	4	28	−24

August 2; 19:05	Nicaragua	1–11 (F/7)	Colombia	Baseball Stadium, Lima; Attendance: 1,513
August 2; 19:05		Boxscore		Baseball Stadium, Lima; Attendance: 1,513

August 3; 19:05	Puerto Rico	2–1	Colombia	Baseball Stadium, Lima; Attendance: 2,313
August 3; 19:05		Boxscore		Baseball Stadium, Lima; Attendance: 2,313

Bronze medal match

August 4; 11:05	Colombia	0–6	Nicaragua (bronze)	Baseball Stadium, Lima; Attendance: N/A
August 4; 11:05		Boxscore		Baseball Stadium, Lima; Attendance: N/A

== Basketball ==
=== 5 × 5 ===
Summary

Team	Event	Preliminary round				Semifinal	Final / BM / Pl.	
Team	Event	Opposition Result	Opposition Result	Opposition Result	Rank	Opposition Result	Opposition Result	Rank
Colombia wimen	Men's tournament	Virgin Islands; W 69-66	Argentina; W 20-0	United States; L 63-75	2 Q	Brazil; L 48-62	Puerto Rico; L 55-66	4

==== Women's tournament ====
Preliminary round

Team	Pld	W	L	PF	PA	PD	Pts	Qualification
United States	3	3	0	248	180	+68	6	Qualified for the Semifinals
Colombia	3	2	1	152	141	+11	5	Qualified for the Semifinals
Argentina	3	1	2	135	149	−14	3 (Note: Argentina did not receive a point for the forfeit loss to Colombia.)	
Virgin Islands	3	0	3	180	245	−65	3	

Notes:

6 August 2019
18:00

Report

Colombia	69–66	Virgin Islands
Scoring by quarter: 17–21, 16–14, 16–16, 20–15
Pts: Arias 21; Rebs: Mosquera 18; Asts: Palacio 5		Pts: Day 23; Rebs: Day 15; Asts: three players 2

Coliseo Eduardo Dibos, Lima
Referees: Jorge Vázquez (PUR)

7 August 2019
13:30

Report

Argentina	0–20 (forfeit)	Colombia

Coliseo Eduardo Dibos, Lima
Referees: Daniel García (VEN)

8 August 2019
13:30

Report

United States	75–63	Colombia
Scoring by quarter: 24–13, 23–8, 12–18, 16–24
Pts: Mompremier 15; Rebs: Onyenwere 9 Asts: Harris, Pivec 3		Pts: Muñoz 11; Rebs: Mosquera 8 Asts: Ríos, Mosquera 2

Coliseo Eduardo Dibos, Lima
Attendance: Cristiano Maranho (BRA)

Semifinals

9 August 2019
18:00

Report

Brazil	62–48	Colombia
Scoring by quarter: 13–17, 16–4, 20–14, 13–13
Pts: Dos Santos 18; Rebs: Dos Santos 13; Asts: De Souza 4		Pts: Muñoz 9 Rebs: Mosquera 7 Asts: Arias 2

Coliseo Eduardo Dibos, Lima
Referees: Luis Vázquez (PUR)

Bronze medal match

10 August 2019
18:00

Report

Colombia	55–66	Puerto Rico
Scoring by quarter: 9–13, 6–23, 22–14, 18–16
Pts: Mosquera 13; Rebs: Mosquera 6 Asts: Ríos 3		Pts: Gwathmey 13; Rebs: Gwathmey 14; Asts: Rosado 6

Coliseo Eduardo Dibos, Lima
Referees: Leonardo Zalazar (ARG)

== Bodybuilding ==
Colombia qualified a full team of two bodybuilders (one male and one female).

Athlete	Event	Pre-judging		Final	
Athlete	Event	Points	Ranking	Points	Ranking
Carlos Barragán	Men's class bodybuilding	—N/a		38	2nd place, silver medalist(s)
Ana Marcela González	Women's bikini fitness	—N/a		Did not advance	

- There were no results in the pre-judging stage, with only the top six advancing.

== Bowling ==
Athlete	Event	Qualification / Final														Round robin											Semifinal	Final	
Athlete	Event	Block 1						Block 2						Total	Rank	Round robin											Semifinal	Final	
Athlete	Event	1	2	3	4	5	6	7	8	9	10	11	12	Total	Rank	1	2	3	4	5	6	7	8	Total	Grand total	Rank	Opposition Result	Opposition Result	Rank
Manuel Otalora	Men's singles	190	226	216	168	201	224	172	247	180	183	236	216	2459	23	Did not advance													
Alfredo Quintana	Men's singles	216	236	211	255	191	200	214	181	180	159	212	193	2448	24	Did not advance													
Manuel Otalora; Alfredo Quintana	Men's doubles	520	434	443	376	399	460	474	436	475	494	489	515	5515	2nd place, silver medalist(s)	—N/a													
Clara Guerrero	Women's singles	257	217	202	212	268	199	216	280	165	228	248	237	2729	2 Q	199	197	192	197	225	237	168	211	1686	4415	3 Q	Lomeli Lemus (MEX); W 213-202	Velazco (MEX); W 198-171	1st place, gold medalist(s)
María Rodríguez	Women's singles	218	197	230	173	226	165	279	216	218	186	225	224	2557	6 Q	224	229	216	205	227	189	236	214	1840	4397	4 Q	Velazco (MEX); L 146-185	Did not advance	3rd place, bronze medalist(s)
Clara Guerrero; María Rodríguez	Women's doubles	455	388	480	360	396	363	383	397	376	437	453	419	4907	6	—N/a													

== Boxing ==
Colombia qualified 12 boxers (eight men and four women).

Men

Athlete	Event	Preliminares	Quarterfinal	Semifinal	Final	
Athlete	Event	Opposition Result	Opposition Result	Opposition Result	Opposition Result	Rank
Yuberjen Martínez	–49 kg	Bye	Lavegar (DOM); W 5–0	Arias (NCA); W 5–0	Collazo (PUR); L 1–4	2nd place, silver medalist(s)
Yilmar Landázury	–52 kg	Bye	Veitía (CUB); L 0–5	Did not advance		
Ceiber Ávila	–56 kg	Bye	Caballero (CUB); L 0–5	Did not advance		
Miguel Ferrín	–64 kg	Cedeño (DOM); L 2–3	Did not advance			
Alexander Rangel	–69 kg	Bye	Johnson (USA); L 1–4	Did not advance		
Jorge Vivas	–75 kg	Bye	Isley (USA); L 2–3	Did not advance		
Deivi Julio	–91 kg	Bye	Castillo (ECU); L 2–3	Did not advance		
Cristian Salcedo	+91 kg	Bye	Paul (TTO); W 5–0	Brown (JAM); W 5–0	Pero (CUB); L 1–4	2nd place, silver medalist(s)

Women

Athlete	Event	Quarterfinal	Semifinal	Final	
Athlete	Event	Opposition Result	Opposition Result	Opposition Result	Rank
Ingrit Valencia	–51 kg	Valdivia (PER); W 3–2	Hernández (DOM); W 5–0	Fuchs (USA); W 4–1	1st place, gold medalist(s)
Yeni Arias	–57 kg	Aubin (CAN); W 3–2	Sánchez (ARG); L 0–5	Did not advance	3rd place, bronze medalist(s)
Paola Calderon	–69 kg	Moronta (DOM); L 0–5	Did not advance		
Jessica Caicedo	–75 kg	Pachito (ECU); W 4–1	Thibeault (CAN); W 3–2	Graham (USA); W 4–1	DSQ ^{[a]}

- ^{a} Jessica Caicedo, of Colombia, lost the gold medal due to doping violation.

== Canoeing ==
=== Sprint ===
Men

Athlete	Event	Heat		Semifinal		Final	
Athlete	Event	Time	Rank	Time	Rank	Time	Rank
Edwin Amaya	K-1 200 m	42.179	8	Did not advance			
Edwin Amaya	K-1 1000 m	3.48.522	5 SF	3:45.004	2 QF	3:47.667	8

Women

Athlete	Event	Heat		Semifinal		Final	
Athlete	Event	Time	Rank	Time	Rank	Time	Rank
Manuela Gómez	C-1 200 m	49.448	3 SF	48.380	2 QF	49.991	6
Ana Ochoa; Manuela Gómez	C-2 500 m	—N/a				2:12.548	6

Qualification legend: QF – Qualify to final; SF – Qualify to semifinal

== Cycling ==
=== BMX ===
Freestyle

Athlete	Event	Qualification		Final	
Athlete	Event	Points	Rank	Points	Rank
Daniela Moran	Women's	60.02	3	68.00	4

Racing

Athlete	Event	Ranking round		Quarterfinal		Semifinal		Final	
Athlete	Event	Time	Rank	Points	Rank	Time	Rank	Time	Rank
Diego Arboleda	Men's	33.153	1	3	1 Q	17	5	Did not advance	
Carlos Ramírez	Men's	33.690	6	6	2 Q	8	3 Q	Did not finish	
Mariana Pajón	Women's	37.221	1	—N/a		3	1 Q	36.323	1st place, gold medalist(s)
Gabriela Bolle	Women's	40.390	10	—N/a		11	4 Q	38.877	6

=== Mountain biking ===
Athlete	Event	Time	Rank
Héctor Leonardo Páez	Men's	1:29:47	4
Cristian Aranzazu	Men's	DNF	
Laura Abril	Women's	1:31:33	4
Leidy Mera	Women's	1:39:46	10

=== Road cycling ===
Athlete	Event	Time	Rank
Bryan Gómez	Men's road race	4:06:28	3rd place, bronze medalist(s)
Juan Esteban Arango	Men's road race	4:08:23	12
Brayan Sánchez	Men's road race	4:09:03	18
Brandon Rivera	Men's road race	4:09:20	28
Daniel Martínez	Men's time trial	44:22.71	1st place, gold medalist(s)
Brandon Rivera	Men's time trial	46:48.73	4
Lina Hernández	Women's road race	2:19:50	4
Milena Salcedo	Women's road race	2:19:51	5
Jessica Parra	Women's road race	2:19:53	13
Lina Hernández	Women's time trial	26:53.73	11
Lina Rojas	Women's time trial	27:36.40	14

=== Track cycling ===
Sprint

Athlete	Event	Qualification		Round of 16	Repechage 1	Quarterfinals	Semifinals	Final	
Athlete	Event	Time	Rank	Opposition Time	Opposition Time	Opposition Result	Opposition Result	Opposition Result	Rank
Kevin Quintero	Men's	10.104	4 Q	Ramírez (COL); W 10.609	—N/a	En Fa (SUR); W 10.519, W 10.453	Paul (TTO); L 10.432, W 10.256,L 10.472	Bronze medal Canelón (VEN); W 10.466, W 10.556	(silver) ^{b}
Santiago Ramírez	Men's	10.281	9 Q	Quintero (COL); D 10.609	Archambault (CAN), Estrada (GUA); V 10.635	Phillip (TTO); D 10.492, D 10.324	—N/a	Fonseca (BRA); En Fa (SUR); Bottasso (ARG); D	5 ^{a} ^{b}
Rubén Murillo; Kevin Quintero; Santiago Ramírez	Men's team	45.046	2 Q	—N/a				Bramble (TTO); Paul (TTO); Phillip (TTO); L	(gold) ^{[b]}
Martha Bayona	Women's	11.134	2 Q	Sevilla (ECU); W 11.904	—N/a	Gaviria (COL); W 12.029, W 12.076	González (MEX); L 11.426, W 11.457, W 12.197	Mitchel (CAN); L 11.415, L 11.449	2nd place, silver medalist(s)
Juliana Gaviria	Women's	11.710	8 Q	Valles (MEX); L 11.790	Tarira (ECU), Palmer (JAM); W 11.962	Bayona (COL); L 12.029, L 12.076	—N/a	5th-8th place classification Guerra (CUB); Hacohen (GUA); Walsh (CAN); L	8
Martha Bayona; Juliana Gaviria	Women's team	34.437	3 Q	—N/a				Bronze medal Díaz (ARG); Vera (ARG); L	3rd place, bronze medalist(s)

- ^{a} Kacio Fonseca, of Brazil, was disqualified for doping violation.
- ^{b} Njisane Phillip, of Trinidad and Tobago, was disqualified for doping violation.

Keirin

Athlete	Event	Heats	Repechage	Final
Athlete	Event	Rank	Rank	Rank
Kevin Quintero	Men's	1 FA	—N/a	1st place, gold medalist(s)
Martha Bayona	Women's	1 FA	—N/a	1st place, gold medalist(s)

Madison

Athlete	Event	Points	Rank
Juan Esteban Arango; Brayan Sánchez	Men's	61	3rd place, bronze medalist(s)
Lina Rojas; Milena Salcedo	Women's	14	4

Pursuit

Athlete	Event	Qualification		Semifinals	Finals	
Athlete	Event	Time	Rank	Opposition Result	Opposition Result	Rank
Juan Esteban Arango; Bryan Gómez; Jordan Parra; Brayan Sánchez	Men's team	4:07.153	2 QF	—N/a	United States; L 4:05.098	2nd place, silver medalist(s)
Lina Hernández; Jessica Parra; Lina Rojas; Milena Salcedo	Women's team	4:39.523	4 Q	Cuba; L 4:40.046	Mexico; W 4:36.256	3rd place, bronze medalist(s)

Omnium

Athlete	Event	Scratch race		Tempo race		Elimination race		Points race		Total	
Athlete	Event	Rank	Points	Points	Rank	Rank	Points	Points	Rank	Points	Rank
Juan Esteban Arango	Men's	4	34	36	3	4	34	29	5	133	4
Lina Hernández	Women's	10	22	36	3	3	36	21	5	115	4

== Diving ==
Men

Athlete	Event	Preliminary		Final	
Athlete	Event	Points	Rank	Points	Rank
Sebastián Morales	Men's 1m Springboard	345.25	6 Q	398.55	5
Daniel Restrepo	Men's 1m Springboard	344.45	7 Q	366.20	8
Daniel Restrepo	Men's 3m Springboard	443.60	2	468.10	1st place, gold medalist(s)
Sebastián Morales	Men's 3m Springboard	388.60	7 Q	399.95	9
Sebastián Villa	Men's 10m Platform	437.35	3 Q	392.40	10
Víctor Ortega	Men's 10m Platform	358.35	12 Q	374.10	12
Sebastián Morales; Daniel Restrepo	Men's 3m Synchro	—N/a		389.31	4
Sebastián Villa; Víctor Ortega	Men's 10m Synchro Platform	—N/a		363.99	5

Women

Athlete	Event	Preliminary		Final	
Athlete	Event	Points	Rank	Points	Rank
Diana Pineda	Women's 1m Springboard	240.70	5 Q	259.00	5
Steffanie Madrigal	Women's 1m Springboard	221.85	10 Q	230.45	11
Diana Pineda	Women's 3m Springboard	279.40	8 Q	274.35	7
Viviana Uribe	Women's 3m Springboard	251.35	9 Q	269.55	8
Viviana Uribe	Women's 10m Platform	254.20	10 Q	224.20	10
Valentina Quintero	Women's 10m Platform	175.15	14	Did not advance	
Diana Pineda; Steffanie Madrigal	Women's 3m Synchro	—N/a		249.78	4

== Equestrian ==
Colombia qualified a full team of 12 equestrians (four per discipline).

=== Dressage ===
Athlete	Horse	Event	Qualification						Grand Prix Freestyle / Intermediate I Freestyle	
Athlete	Horse	Event	Grand Prix / Prix St. Georges		Grand Prix Special / Intermediate I		Total		Grand Prix Freestyle / Intermediate I Freestyle	
Athlete	Horse	Event	Score	Rank	Score	Rank	Score	Rank	Score	Rank
Maria Aponte	Duke de Niro	Individual	64.647	27	65.971	19	130.618	22	Did not advance	
Santiago Cardona	Espartaco	Individual	65.235	24	65.235	22	130.470	24	Did not advance	
Raul Corchuelo	Senorita	Individual	68.235	13	68.265	11	136.500	10 Q	70.240	13
Maria Aponte; Santiago Cardona; Raul Corchuelo	As above	Team	198.117	5	199.471	5	397.588	5	—N/a	

=== Eventing ===
Athlete	Horse	Event	Dressage		Cross-country		Jumping		Total	
Athlete	Horse	Event	Points	Rank	Points	Rank	Points	Rank	Points	Rank
Mauricio Bermudez	Fernhill Nightshift	Individual	41.60	31	Eliminated		Did not advance			
Jhonatan Rodriguez	Caipirina	Individual	41.40	29	Eliminated		Did not advance			
Juan Tafur Eisenmayer	Blue Moon	Individual	44.20	37	Eliminated		Did not advance			
Mauricio Bermudez; Jhonatan Rodriguez; Juan Tafur Eisenmayer	As above	Team	127.20	9	3000.00	10	Did not advance		3000.00	10

=== Jumping ===
Athlete	Horse	Event	Qualification								Final					
Athlete	Horse	Event	Round 1		Round 2		Round 3		Total		Round A		Round B		Total	
Athlete	Horse	Event	Faults	Rank	Faults	Rank	Faults	Rank	Faults	Rank	Faults	Rank	Faults	Rank	Faults	Rank
Fernando Cardenas	Quincy Car	Individual	6.48	23	12	27	8	16	26.48	26 Q	Eliminated					
Rodrigo Díaz	Alonzo d'Ete	Individual	9.99	31	8	15	13	32	30.99	27 Q	9	17	14	20	23	19
Juan Gallego	Fee des Sequoias Z	Individual	2.91	14	8	15	5	14	15.91	15 Q	5	11	5	14	10	10
Fernando Cardenas; Rodrigo Díaz; Juan Gallego	As above	Team	19.38	7	28	6	26	6	73.38	6	—N/a					

== Fencing ==
Colombia qualified a team of 13 fencers (seven men and six women).

Men

Athlete	Event	Pool Round		Round of 16	Quarterfinals	Semifinals	Final / BM	
Athlete	Event	Result	Seed	Opposition Score	Opposition Score	Opposition Score	Opposition Score	Rank
Jhon Édison Rodríguez	Individual épée	4W-1L	4	Hoyle (USA); W 15 – 9	McDowald (USA); W 15 – 13	Limardo (VEN); L 10 – 11	Did not advance	3rd place, bronze medalist(s)
Daniel Sconzo	Individual foil	4W-1L	2	Bye	Alarcón (CHI); L 14 – 15	Did not advance		
Dimitri Clairet	Individual foil	2W-3L	13	van Haaster (CAN); L 11 – 15	Did not advance			
Daniel Sconzo; Santiago Niño; Dimitri Clairet	Team foil	—N/a			Puerto Rico; W 45–37	United States; L 22–45	Canada; L 29–45	4
Luis Correa Vila	Individual sabre	3V-2D	8º	Cuellar (COL); W 15 – 7	Rodríguez (CUB); L 14 – 15	Não avançou		
Sebastian Cuellar	Individual sabre	3W-2L	9	Vila (COL); L 7 – 15	Did not advance			
Luis Correa Vila; Pablo Benítez; Sebastian Cuellar	Team sabre	—N/a			Brazil; W 45–37	Canada; L 34–45	Venezuela; W 45–44	3rd place, bronze medalist(s)

Women

Athlete	Event	Pool Round		Round of 16	Quarterfinals	Semifinals	Final / BM	
Athlete	Event	Result	Seed	Opposition Score	Opposition Score	Opposition Score	Opposition Score	Rank
Saskia Loretta van Erven Garcia	Individual foil	3W-2L	9	Mormandi (ARG); L 6 – 15	Did not advance			18
Tatiana Prieto	Individual foil	0V-6D	18º	Não avançou				18º
Saskia Loretta van Erven Garcia; Vanessa Camero; Tatiana Prieto	Team foil	—N/a			Argentina; W 45–29	United States; L 24–45	Mexico; L 25–45	4
María Blanco	Individual sabre	2V-3D	9º	Rodríguez (VEN); W 15 – 9	Benítez (VEN); L 7 – 15	Did not advance		
Jessica Morales Linares	Individual sabre	1V-4D	16	Did not advance				16
María Blanco; Linda Castellano; Jessica Morales Linares	Team sabre	—N/a			Mexico; L 36–45	Peru; W 45–17	Venezuela; L 26–45	6

== Football ==
Colombia qualified a women's team (of 18 athletes) by finishing in one of the three qualification spots at the 2018 Copa América Femenina.

Summary

Team	Event	Group stage				Semifinal	Final / BM / Pl.	
Team	Event	Opposition Result	Opposition Result	Opposition Result	Rank	Opposition Result	Opposition Result	Rank
Colombia women	Women's tournament	Paraguay; D 0–0	Jamaica; W 2–0	Mexico; D 2–2	2 Q	Costa Rica; W 4–3 (a.e.t.)	Argentina; W 1–1 (7–6 pen)	1st place, gold medalist(s)

=== Group A ===
Pos	Team	Pld	W	D	L	GF	GA	GD	Pts	Qualification
1	Paraguay	3	2	1	0	5	2	+3	7	Knockout stage
2	Colombia	3	1	2	0	4	2	+2	5	Knockout stage
3	Mexico	3	1	1	1	5	4	+1	4	Fifth place match
4	Jamaica	3	0	0	3	1	7	−6	0	Seventh place match

Source: Lima 2019
Rules for classification: Tie-breakers
28 July 2019
13:00

Paraguay	0–0	Colombia
	Report

Estadio Universidad San Marcos
Referee: Deborah Cruz (Brazil)

31 July 2019
13:00

Jamaica	0–2	Colombia
	Report	Santos 58', 85'

Estadio Universidad San Marcos
Referee: Milagros Arruela (Peru)

3 August 2019
10:00

Mexico	2–2	Colombia
Caracas 59' (o.g.); Corral 87'	Report	Echeverri 26'; Vanegas 36'

Estadio Universidad San Marcos
Referee: Susana Corella (Ecuador)

Semifinal

6 August 2019
20:30

Costa Rica	3–4 (a.e.t.)	Colombia
C. Sánchez 59', 87'; Salas 89'	Report	Santos 30'; Gaitán 33'; Ospina 68'; Usme 93'

Estadio Universidad San Marcos
Referee: Deborah Cruz (Brazil)

Gold medal match

9 August 2019
20:30

Argentina	1–1 (a.e.t.)	Colombia
Barroso 41'	Report 1 Report 2	Usme 33'
Penalties
Larroquette (penalty scored); Stábile (penalty scored); Santana (penalty scored); Cometti (penalty scored); Oviedo (penalty scored); Barroso (penalty scored); Chávez (penalty missed)	6–7	(penalty scored) Usme; (penalty scored) Restrepo; (penalty scored) Gaitán; (penalty scored) Echeverri; (penalty scored) Santos; (penalty scored) Vanegas; (penalty scored) C. Arias

Estadio Universidad San Marcos
Referee: Susana Corella (Ecuador)

== Golf ==
Colombia qualified a full team of four golfers (two men and two women).

Athlete	Event	Round 1	Round 2	Round 3	Round 4	Total		
Athlete	Event	Score	Score	Score	Score	Score	Par	Rank
Santiago Gómez	Men's individual	70	70	69	67	276	−8	8
Ricardo Celia	Men's individual	72	71	75	70	288	+4	22
Paula Hurtado-Restrepo	Women's individual	71	72	70	68	281	-3	3rd place, bronze medalist(s)
Paola Moreno	Women's individual	71	73	74	72	290	+6	9
Santiago Gómez (golfer); Ricardo Celia; Paula Hurtado-Restrepo; Paola Moreno	Mixed team	141	142	139	135	557	−11	4

== Gymnastics ==
=== Trampoline ===
Colombia qualified a team of two gymnasts in trampoline (one man and one woman).

Men

- 1 quota

Women

- 1 quota

== Judo ==
Men

Athlete	Event	Round of 16	Quarterfinals	Semifinals	Repechage	Final / BM	
Athlete	Event	Opposition Result	Opposition Result	Opposition Result	Opposition Result	Opposition Result	Rank
John Futtinico	−60 kg	H Vera (CHI); W 11S1–00S2	L Preciado (ECU); L 00S1–10S2	Did not advance	E Ramírez (DOM); L 00S3–10S2	Did not advance	7
Jorge González	−66 kg	M Tamashiro (ARG); W 11–00	O Solís (CUB); L 00–01	Did not advance	J Postigos (PER); L 00S1–01S1	Did not advance	7
Leider Navarro	−73 kg	J Ruiz (PUR); W 01S2–00	M Estrada (CUB); L 00S1–10S1	Did not advance	J Santos Júnior (BRA); L 00S3–10S1	Did not advance	7
Francisco Balanta	−90 kg	Bye	T Spikermann (ARG); W 10–00S3	R Florentino (DOM); W 10S2–00	—N/a	I Silva (CUB); L 00–10	2nd place, silver medalist(s)
Carlos Garzón	−100 kg	Bye	T Briceño (CHI); L 00S1–10	Did not advance	J Osório (PER); L 00S1–11S1	Did not advance	7

Women

Athlete	Event	Round of 16	Quarterfinals	Semifinals	Repechage	Final / BM	
Athlete	Event	Opposition Result	Opposition Result	Opposition Result	Opposition Result	Opposition Result	Rank
Luz Álvarez	−48 kg	Bye	E Soriano (DOM); L 00S2–01S1	Did not advance	E Carrillo (MEX); L 00S3–10S2	Did not advance	7
Yadinys Amaris	−57 kg	Bye	M Roper (PAN); L 01S2–10S1	Did not advance	K Arango (PER); W 10–00	A Dorvigny (CUB); W 10S2–00	(silver) ^{[a]}
Madeline Choconta	−63 kg	A Cornejo (PER); W 01S2–00S2	M Carvajal (CUB); L 00–10	Did not advance	E García (ECU); L 00S3–10S2	Did not advance	7
Yuri Alvear	−70 kg	Bye	C Wright (USA); W 11–00	O Cortés (CUB); W 10–00S2	—N/a	E Rodríguez (VEN); L 00–10	2nd place, silver medalist(s)
Laura Castillo	+78 kg	Y Bolívar (PER); L 00S2–10	Did not advance				9

- ^{57 kg} Rafaela Silva, of Brazil, was stripped of her gold medal for doping violation.

== Karate ==
Kumite (sparring)

Athlete	Event	Round robin				Semifinal	Final	
Athlete	Event	Opposition Result	Opposition Result	Opposition Result	Rank	Opposition Result	Opposition Result	Rank
Andrés Rendón	Men's –60 kg	Brose (BRA); D 0-0	Larrosa (URU); L 3-4	Farah (ARG); L 0-1	4	Did not advance		
Juan Landázuri	Men's –75 kg	Valdívia (PER); D 1-1	Veríssimo (BRA); L 0-2	Scott (USA); L 1-1	3	Did not advance		
Carlos Sinisterra	Men's –84 kg	Espinoza (ECU); D 0-0	Valera (VEN); W 3-0	Mendoza (PER); W 1-0	1 Q	Cuevas (MEX); W 2-1	Madani (USA); W 1-0	Disqualified for doping
Diego Lenis	Men's +84 kg	Beltrán (PER); W 6-0	Mina (ECU); W 2-1	Rojas (CHI); L 1-1	2 Q	Gaysisnky (CAN); L 0-8	Did not advance	3rd place, bronze medalist(s)
Wendy Mosquera	Women's –68 kg	Baute (VEN); L 1-5	Murphy (USA); W 1-0	Sepe (BRA); W 7-0	2 Q	Rodríguez (DOM); L 3-3	Did not advance	3rd place, bronze medalist(s)

Kata (forms)

Athlete	Event	Pool round 1		Pool round 2		Final / BM	
Athlete	Event	Score	Rank	Score	Rank	Opposition Result	Rank
Alejandro Ramírez; Danny Díaz; Samuel Giraldo	Men's team	22.92	2 Q	—N/a		Bronze medal contest Argentina; L 24.04-24.98	5
Natália Pachón; María Camila Moreno; Diana Muñoz	Women's team	23.62	3 Q	—N/a		Bronze medal contest Brazil; L 23.74-24.06	5

== Modern pentathlon ==
Colombia qualified two modern pentathletes (one man and one woman).

Athlete	Event	Fencing (Épée one touch)			Swimming (200 m freestyle)			Riding (Show jumping)			Shooting / Running (10 m laser pistol / 3000 m cross-country)			Total	
Athlete	Event	V – D	Rank	MP points	Time	Rank	MP points	Penalties	Rank	MP points	Time	Rank	MP points	MP points	Rank
Luis Alfonso Matallán	Men's individual	8-23	30	152	2:34.94	29	241	48	20	252	14:34.00	31	426	1071	26
Valentina Buitrago	Women's individual	10-21	26	167	2:35.57	22	239	EL		0	16:53.00	287	29	693	28
Luis Alfonso Matallán; Valentina Buitrago	Mixed relay	8-40	12	146	2:17.95	11	275	DNS						421	13

== Racquetball ==
Colombia qualified four racquetball athletes (two men and two women).

Men

Athlete	Event	Qualifying Round robin				Round of 16	Quarterfinals	Semifinals	Final	Rank
Athlete	Event	Match 1	Match 2	Match 3	Rank	Opposition Result	Opposition Result	Opposition Result	Opposition Result	Rank
Sebastian Franco	Men's singles	(United States) Jake Bredenbeck; L 2–0	(Guatemala) Edwin Galicia; W 2–0	(Peru) Jonathan Luque; W 2–0	2	(Canada) Coby Iwaasa; L 2–1	Did not advance			5
Mario Mercado	Men's singles	(Bolivia) Carlos Keller; W 2–0	(Guatemala) Juan Salvatierra; W 2–0	-	1	(Costa Rica) Felipe Camacho; W 2–0	(United States) Jake Bredenbeck; W 2–1	(Mexico) Álvaro Beltrán; L 2–0	Did not advance	3rd place, bronze medalist(s)
Sebastian Franco; Mario Mercado	Men's doubles	(Bolivia) Roland Keller; Conrrado Moscoso; L 2–0	(Ecuador) Fernando Rios; Jose Ugalde; L 2–0	(Peru) Jonathan Luque; Sebastian Mendiguri; W 2–0	3	(Dominican Republic) Ramon De Leon; Luis Perez; W 2–0	(United States) Rocky Carson; Charles Pratt; L 2–1	Did not advance		5
Sebastian Franco; Mario Mercado	Men's team	—N/a				Peru; W 2–0	Canada; W 2–0	Mexico; W 2–1	Bolivia; L 2–1	2nd place, silver medalist(s)

Women

Athlete	Event	Qualifying Round robin				Round of 16	Quarterfinals	Semifinals	Final	Rank
Athlete	Event	Match 1	Match 2	Match 3	Rank	Opposition Result	Opposition Result	Opposition Result	Opposition Result	Rank
Cristina Amaya	Singles	(Bolivia) Valeria Centellas; L 2–1	(Cuba) Maria Regla Viera; W 2–0	(Chile) Josefa Parada; W 2–0	2	(Bolivia) Angelica Barrios; L 2–1	Did not advance			
Adriana Riveros	Singles	(Argentina) Natalia Mendez; L 2–0	(Venezuela) Lilian Zea; W 2–0	-	2	(Bolivia) Valeria Centellas; W 2–1	(United States) Rhonda Rajsich; W 2–0	(Argentina) María José Vargas; L 2–0	Did not advance	3rd place, bronze medalist(s)
Cristina Amaya; Adriana Riveros	Doubles	(Argentina) Natalia Mendez; María José Vargas; L 2–0	(Chile) Carla Muñoz; Josefa Parada; W 2–0	(Cuba) Loraine Felipe; Maria Regla Viera; W 2–0	3	(Cuba) Loraine Felipe; Maria Regla Viera; W 2–0	(Guatemala) Gabriela Martínez; Maria Rodriguez; L 2–1	Did not advance		5
Cristina Amaya; Adriana Riveros	Team	—N/a				Bye	United States; L 2–0	Did not advance		5

== Roller sports ==
=== Artistic ===
Athlete	Event	Short program		Long program		Total	
Athlete	Event	Score	Rank	Score	Rank	Score	Rank
Jairo Ortiz	Men's	42.29	5	67.84	5	110.13	6
Valentina Apolinar	Women's	17.66	7	45.87	3	63.53	5

=== Speed ===
Athlete	Event	Preliminary		Semifinal		Final	
Athlete	Event	Time	Rank	Time	Rank	Time	Rank
Pedro Causil	Men's 300 m time trial	—N/a				24.701	1st place, gold medalist(s)
Pedro Causil	Men's 500 m	44.282	1 Q	43.857	1 Q	40.650	1st place, gold medalist(s)
Álex Cujavante	Men's 10,000 m elimination	—N/a				16:36.890	1st place, gold medalist(s)
Geiny Pájaro	Women's 300 m time trial	—N/a				26.627	2nd place, silver medalist(s)
Geiny Pájaro	Women's 500 m	46.636	1 Q	46.550	1 Q	47.276	1st place, gold medalist(s)
Johana Viveros	Women's 10,000 m elimination	—N/a				19:31.691	1st place, gold medalist(s)

== Rugby sevens ==
=== Women's tournament ===
Pool stage

Pos	Team	Pld	W	D	L	PF	PA	PD	Pts	Qualification
1	United States	3	3	0	0	142	0	+142	9	Semifinals
2	Colombia	3	2	0	1	62	62	0	7	Semifinals
3	Argentina	3	1	0	2	55	73	−18	5	5–8th place semifinals
4	Trinidad and Tobago	3	0	0	3	10	134	−124	3	5–8th place semifinals

Source: Lima 2019
Rules for classification: 1) Points; 2) Head-to-head result; 3) Point difference; 4) Points scored; 5) draw.

26 July 2019
9:50

Colombia	24–14	Argentina
Try: Romero 1'm Arzuaga 3'c Mejia (2) 6'c, 7'm Con: Lopera (2/3) 3', 7'; Romero (0/1)	Report	Try: Montero 0'c Mattus 9'c Con: Montero (1/1) 1'; Padellaro (1/1) 9'

Villa María del Triunfo Sports Center
Referee: Emily Hsieh (United States)

27 July 2019
10:10

Colombia	38–10	Trinidad and Tobago
Try: Soto 1'c Mejia 2'c Arzuaga (2) 5'c, 7'c Lopera 7'm Acevado 10'; Con: Lopera (4/5) 1', 2', 5', 7'	Report	Try: Glasgow 6'm John 14'm Con: Jack (0/1); Pantor (0/1)

Villa María del Triunfo Sports Center
Referee: Nayara Santos (Brazil)

27 July 2019
14:25

United States	38–0	Colombia
Try: Maher 1'c Ramsey (3) 6'm, 9'm, 12'c Rovetti 8'c Henrich 14'c Con: Emba (2/3) 1', 14'; Olsen (2/3) 8', 12'	Report

Villa María del Triunfo Sports Center
Referee: Nerea Livoni (Argentina)

Semifinal

28 July 2019
10:50

Canada	41–0	Colombia
Try: de Couvreur (3) 1'c, 2'm, 8'm Kaljuvee (3) 5'c, 6'c, 12'm Hogan-Rochester 11'm Con: Levale (3/5) 1', 6', 7'; Nicholas (0/2)	Report

Villa María del Triunfo Sports Center
Referee: Emily Hsieh (United States)

Bronze medal match

28 July 2019
14:40

Colombia	29–24 (a.e.t.)	Brazil
Try: Ibarra 3'c S. Acevado 5'm Lopera (2) 11'm, 16'; N. Acevado 14'c Con: Lopera (2/4) 4', 14'	Report	Try: Cerullo 0'c da Silva 2'm B. Silva 7'c de Souza 8'm Con: Kochhann (2/4) 1', 7'

Villa María del Triunfo Sports Center
Referee: Emily Hsieh (United States)

== Sailing ==
Men

Athlete	Event	Race													Total	
Athlete	Event	1	2	3	4	5	6	7	8	9	10	11	12	M	Points	Rank
Andrey Quintero	Laser	8	13	~~17~~	14	11	14	12	13	13	13	—N/a		Não avançou	111	13

Open

Athlete	Event	Race																					Total	
Athlete	Event	1	2	3	4	5	6	7	8	9	10	11	12	13	14	15	16	17	18	M1	M2	M3	Points	Rank
John Mora	Kites	~~10~~	8	5	7	~~10~~	~~10~~	10	9	8	10	7	6	6	6	8	10	8	10	Did not advance			118	9
Simón Gómez	Sunfish	2	7	~~13~~	11	5	11	9	6	8	9	—N/a								Did not advance	—N/a		68	9

== Shooting ==
Men

Athlete	Event	Qualification		Final	
Athlete	Event	Points	Rank	Points	Rank
Bernardo Prado	25 m rapid fire pistol	555	10	Did not advance	
Danilo Guarnieri	Trap	115	8	Did not advance	

Women

Athlete	Event	Qualification		Final	
Athlete	Event	Points	Rank	Points	Rank
Juana Vargas	10 m air pistol	558	10	Did not advance	
Juana Vargas	25 m pistol	563	10	Did not advance	
Amanda Cuellar	10 m air pistol	551	16	Did not advance	
Amanda Cuellar	25 m pistol	562	11	Did not advance	

== Squash ==
Colombia qualified a full team of 6 athletes through the 2018 Pan American Squash Championships.

Men

Athlete	Event	Group stage			Round of 16	Quarterfinal	Semifinal / Cl.	Final / BM / Pl.	
Athlete	Event	Opposition Result	Opposition Result	Rank	Opposition Result	Opposition Result	Opposition Result	Opposition Result	Rank
Miguel Ángel Rodríguez	Singles	—N/a			Sachvie (CAN); W 3-0	Hanson (USA); W 3-0	Pezzota (ARG); W 3-1	Elías (PER); L 1-3	2nd place, silver medalist(s)
Andrés Herrera; Juan Camilo Vargas	Doubles	—N/a			Mometto / Alarcón (BRA); W 2-0	Elías / Escudero (PER); L 0-2	Did not advance		
Miguel Ángel Rodríguez; Andrés Herrera; Juan Camilo Vargas	Team	Brazil; W 2-1	Bermuda; W 3-0	1	—N/a	Guatemala; W 2-0	Canada; W 2-0	United States; L 1-2	2nd place, silver medalist(s)

Women

Athlete	Event	Group stage				Round of 16	Quarterfinal	Semifinal	Final / BM	
Athlete	Event	Opposition Result	Opposition Result	Opposition Result	Rank	Opposition Result	Opposition Result	Opposition Result	Opposition Result	Rank
Laura Tovar; María Tovar	Doubles	—N/a					Gómez / Terán (MEX); W 2-0	Cornett / Letourneau (CAN); L 1-2	Did not advance	3rd place, bronze medalist(s)
Catalina Peláez; Laura Tovar; María Tovar	Team	Guyana; W 3-0	Canada; L 1-2	Peru; W 3-0	2	—N/a	Argentina; W 2-0	Canada; L 0-3	Did not advance	3rd place, bronze medalist(s)

Mixed

Athlete	Event	Quarterfinal	Semifinal	Final	
Athlete	Event	Opposition Result	Opposition Result	Opposition Result	Rank
Catalina Peláez; Miguel Ángel Rodríguez	Doubles	Bye	Schnell / Naughton (CAN); W 2-0	Ávila / García (MEX); W 2-0	1st place, gold medalist(s)

== Surfing ==
Colombia qualified three surfers (two men and one woman) in the sport's debut at the Pan American Games. However, only two athletes competed.

Artistic

Athlete	Event	Round 1	Round 2	Round 3	Round 4	Repechage 1	Repechage 2	Repechage 3	Repechage 4	Repechage 5	Bronze medal	Final	
Athlete	Event	Opposition Result	Opposition Result	Opposition Result	Opposition Result	Opposition Result	Opposition Result	Opposition Result	Opposition Result	Opposition Result	Opposition Result	Opposition Result	Rank
Giorgio Gómez	Men's stand up paddleboard	de Cabo (ARG), Colucci (VEN); L 7.53 Q	Martino (PER), Rodríguez (MEX); L 13.67 Q	Spencer (CAN); W 16.07–10.70 'Q	Martino (PER); W 14.84–12.57 Q	Bye					—N/a	Martino (PER); W 17.33–14.70	1st place, gold medalist(s)
Izzi Gómez	Women's open	Tuach (BAR); L 8.00–12.40	Não avançou			Thompson (USA); W 13.84–10.80 Q	Tuach (BAR); W 13.40–10.83 Q	Giunta (PER); L 13.26–13.93	Não avançou				
Izzi Gómez	Women's stand up paddleboard	Cosoleto (ARG), Soriano (ECU); W 8.86 Q	Torres (PER), Alabi (ESA); L 7.90 Q	Pacelli (BRA); L 10.90–13.00	Não avançou	Bye		Cosoleto (ARG); W 10.20–3.20 Q	Appleby (USA); W 12.83–7.00 Q	—N/a	Pacelli (BRA); W 14.10–11.56 Q	Torres (PER); W 10.73–9.94	1st place, gold medalist(s)

Race

Athlete	Event	Time	Rank
Giorgio Gómez	Men's stand up paddleboard	26:26.7	4º

== Table tennis ==
Men

Athlete	Event	Group stage			Round of 32	Round of 16	Quarterfinal	Semifinal	Final / BM	
Athlete	Event	Opposition Result	Opposition Result	Rank	Opposition Result	Opposition Result	Opposition Result	Opposition Result	Opposition Result	Rank
Julián Ramos	Singles	—N/a			González (PUR); L 1–4	Did not advance				

Women

Athlete	Event	Group stage			Round of 32	Round of 16	Quarterfinal	Semifinal	Final / BM	
Athlete	Event	Opposition Result	Opposition Result	Rank	Opposition Result	Opposition Result	Opposition Result	Opposition Result	Opposition Result	Rank
María Perdomo	Singles	—N/a			Vega (CHI); L 2–4	Did not advance				
Paula Medina	Singles	—N/a			Edghill (GUY); W 4–0	Argüelles (ARG); W 4–0	Díaz (PUR); L 0–4	Did not advance		
Paula Medina; María Perdomo	Doubles	—N/a				Barcenas / Silva (MEX); L 1–4	Did not advance			
Paula Medina; María Perdomo; Cory Téllez	Team	Brazil; L 0–3	Mexico; L 1–3	3	—N/a		Did not advance			

Mixed

Athlete	Event	Round of 16	Quarterfinal	Semifinal	Final / BM	
Athlete	Event	Opposition Result	Opposition Result	Opposition Result	Opposition Result	Rank
Julián Ramos; Paula Medina	Doubles	Wang / Zhang (CAN); L 0–4	Did not advance			

== Taekwondo ==
Kyorugi (sparring)

Men

Athlete	Event	Preliminary round	Quarterfinal	Semifinal	Repechage	Final / BM	
Athlete	Event	Opposition Result	Opposition Result	Opposition Result	Opposition Result	Opposition Result	Rank
Jefferson Ochoa	–58 kg	Ramos (CHI); W 24–11	Plaza (MEX); L 8–28	Did not advance	—N/a	Bronze medal contest Melo (BRA); L 0–2	5
David Paz	–68 kg	Soto (CRC); L 15–16	Did not advance				
Miguel Trejos	–80 kg	Aurora (PER); W 34–13	Lizárraga (MEX); W 7–6	Cobas (CUB); W 22–19	Bye	Soares (BRA); W 19–17	1st place, gold medalist(s)
Yorman Montalvo	+80 kg	Healy (USA); L 7–11	Did not advance		Sio (ARG); L 11–17	Did not advance	

Women

Athlete	Event	Preliminary round	Quarterfinal	Semifinal	Repechage	Final / BM	
Athlete	Event	Opposition Result	Opposition Result	Opposition Result	Opposition Result	Opposition Result	Rank
Andrea Ramírez	–49 kg	Bye	Stambaugh (PUR); W 6–1	Reis (BRA); L 0–1	—N/a	Bronze medal contest Canseco (PER); W 14–9	3rd place, bronze medalist(s)
María Álvarez	–57 kg	Lindo (CRC); L 14–18	Did not advance				
Katherine Dumar	–67 kg	Cordero (VEN); W 8–0	Titoneli (BRA); L 8–9	Did not advance	Bye	Bronze medal contest Kraayeveld (CAN); W 13–4	3rd place, bronze medalist(s)
Gloria Mosquera	+67 kg	Lawrence (TTO); W 22–1	Gorman-Shore (USA); W 16–5	Fidelis (BRA); W 23–10	Bye	Acosta (MEX); L 5–10	2nd place, silver medalist(s)

== Tennis ==
Men

Athlete	Event	Round of 64	Round of 32	Round of 16	Quarterfinal	Semifinal	Final / BM	
Athlete	Event	Opposition Result	Opposition Result	Opposition Result	Opposition Result	Opposition Result	Opposition Result	Rank
Alejandro González	Singles	Bye	Rubio (MEX); W 6–0, 6–1	Jarry (CHI); L 2–6, 6–7	Did not advance			
Nicolás Mejía	Singles	Estrella (DOM); L 4–6, 2–6	Did not advance					
Santiago Giraldo	Singles	Bye	Rivera (CUB); W 6–0, 6–1	Cid (DOM); L 2–6, 5–7	Did not advance			
Alejandro González; Nicolás Mejía	Doubles	—N/a	Bye	Obando / Turcios (HON); W 6–4, 6–2	Andreozzi / Bagnis (ARG); L 2–6, 1–6	Did not advance		

Women

Athlete	Event	Round of 32	Round of 16	Quarterfinal	Semifinal	Final / BM	
Athlete	Event	Opposition Result	Opposition Result	Opposition Result	Opposition Result	Opposition Result	Rank
Camila Osorio	Singles	Bui (CAN); L 7–5, 5–7, 4–6	Did not advance				
María Herazo González	Singles	Williford (DOM); W 6–0, 6–3	Seguel (CHI); L 1–6, 2–6	Did not advance			
Emiliana Arango	Singles	Graham (USA); L 2–6, 2–6	Did not advance				
Emiliana Arango; María Herazo González	Doubles	—N/a	Bye	Guarachi; Seguel (CHI); L 1–6, 2–6	Did not advance		

Mixed

Athlete	Event	Round of 16	Quarterfinal	Semifinal	Final / BM	
Athlete	Event	Opposition Result	Opposition Result	Opposition Result	Opposition Result	Rank
Santiago Giraldo; Camila Osorio	Doubles	Riffice / Graham (USA); W 6–3, 3–6, 10–3	Jarry / Guarachi (CHI); L 2–6, 3–6	Did not advance		

== Triathlon ==
Individual

Athlete	Event	Swimming (1.5 km)	Transition 1	Biking (40.02 km)	Transition 2	Running (8.88 km)	Total	Rank
Brian Manrique	Men's	17:53	0:51	Did not finish				
Carlos Forero	Men's	18:01	0:51	Did not finish				
Lina Prieto	Women's	19:52	0:58	1:04:39	0:30	37:01	2:02:58	6
Diana Franco	Women's	20:07	1:04	Did not finish				

Mixed relay

Athlete	Event	Swimming (300 m)	Biking (6.6 km)	Running (1.5 km)	Total (including trans.)	Rank
Lina Prieto; Carlos Forero; Diana Franco; Brian Manrique	Mixed relay	16:29	42:13	19:10	1:22:53	6

== Volleyball ==
=== Beach ===
Colombia qualified a women's pair.

Athletes	Event	Preliminary Round			Rank	Round of 16	Quarterfinals	Semifinals	Final / BM	
Athletes	Event	Opposition Score	Opposition Score	Opposition Score	Rank	Opposition Score	Opposition Score	Opposition Score	Opposition Score	Rank
Yuly Ayala; Diana Ríos	Women's tournament	Araya – Valenciano (CRC); L (15–21, 14–21)	Davidson – Grant (TTO); W (21–9, 21–12)	Cook – Pardon (USA); L (20–22, 14–21)	3 Q	Harnett – Lapointe (CAN); W (15–21, 21–14, 15–10)	Horta – Lavalle (BRA); L (17–21, 13–21)	5th-8th place classification Caballero – Valiente (PAR); W (21–19, 21–16)	5th place match Mardones – Rivas (CHI); W (21–12, 21–19)	5

=== Indoor ===
Colombia qualified a women's team (of 12 athletes) by winning finishing in the top five at the 2018 Women's Pan-American Volleyball Cup.

Summary

Team	Event	Group stage				Semifinal	Final / BM / Pl.	
Team	Event	Opposition Result	Opposition Result	Opposition Result	Rank	Opposition Result	Opposition Result	Rank
Colombia women	Women's tournament	Dominican Republic; L 1–3	Peru; W 3–1	Canada; W 3–1	2 Q	Brazil; W 3–2	Dominican Republic; L 1–3	2nd place, silver medalist(s)

=== Women's tournament ===
Group stage

Pos	Team	Pld	W	L	Pts	SW	SL	SR	SPW	SPL	SPR	Qualification
1	Dominican Republic	3	3	0	14	9	1	9.000	252	212	1.189	Semifinals
2	Colombia	3	2	1	9	7	5	1.400	289	274	1.055	Semifinals
3	Peru (H)	3	1	2	5	4	7	0.571	239	252	0.948	5th–6th place match
4	Canada	3	0	3	2	2	9	0.222	224	266	0.842	7th–8th place match

Source: Lima 2019
(H) Host

7 August 2019; 18:30	Dominican Republic	3–1	Colombia	Callao Sports Center; Referees: Josmer Pérez Broche (FIV), Karina Rene (ARG)
7 August 2019; 18:30	(26–24, 27–25, 22–25, 27–25); P2 P3			Callao Sports Center; Referees: Josmer Pérez Broche (FIV), Karina Rene (ARG)

8 August 2019; 20:30	Peru	1–3	Colombia	Callao Sports Center
8 August 2019; 20:30	(25–21, 22–25, 21–25, 22–25); P2 P3			Callao Sports Center

9 August 2019; 18:30	Colombia	3–1	Canada	Callao Sports Center
9 August 2019; 18:30	(25–18, 25–19, 19–25, 25–20); P2 P3			Callao Sports Center

Semifinal

10 August 2019; 18:30	Brazil	2–3	Colombia	Callao Sports Center
10 August 2019; 18:30	(25–22, 27–25, 14–25, 26–28, 9–15); P2 P3			Callao Sports Center

Gold medal match

11 August 2019; 11:00	Colombia	1–3	Dominican Republic	Callao Sports Center
11 August 2019; 11:00	(20–25, 25–19, 25–27, 16–25); P2 P3			Callao Sports Center

== Water skiing ==
Colombia qualified four water skiers (two of each gender) and two wakeboarders (one of each gender).

Water skiing

Men

Athlete	Event	Preliminary		Final				
Athlete	Event	Score	Rank	Slalom	Jump	Tricks	Total	Rank
Federico Jaramillo	Slalom	3.00/58/10.75	8 Q	3.50/58/10.75	—N/a	—N/a	3.50/58/10.75	4
Federico Jaramillo	Tricks	9210	4 Q	—N/a	—N/a	7930	7930	6
Federico Jaramillo	Jump	133	10	Did not advance				
Federico Jaramillo	Overall	2171.20	6 Q	1000.00	291.97	607.88	1899.85	5
Santiago Correa	Slalom	2.50/58/11.25	12	Did not advance				

Women

Athlete	Event	Preliminary		Final				
Athlete	Event	Score	Rank	Slalom	Jump	Tricks	Total	Rank
Luisa Jaramillo	Slalom	4.00/55/11.25	4º Q	2.50/55/12.00	—N/a	—N/a	2.50/55/12.00	5
Luisa Jaramillo	Tricks	5540	9	Did not advance				
Luisa Jaramillo	Jump	87	8	Did not advance				
Luisa Jaramillo	Overall	1705.59	7	Did not advance				
Daniela Verswyvel	Slalom	1.00/55/13.00	11	Did not advance				
Daniela Verswyvel	Tricks	5460	10	Não avançou				
Daniela Verswyvel	Jump	75	9	Did not advance				
Daniela Verswyvel	Overall	1317.47	9	Did not advance				

Wakeboarding

Athlete	Event	Semifinal		Last chance qualifier		Final	
Athlete	Event	Score	Rank	Score	Rank	Score	Rank
Jorge Rocha	Men's	55.11	2 Q	—N/a		63.89	5
Sofía Lopera	Women's	23.66	3 R	30.89	3º	Did not advance	

== Weightlifting ==
Colombia qualified a full team of 12 weightlifters (six man and six women).

Men

Athlete	Event	Snatch		Clean & jerk		Total	
Athlete	Event	Weight	Rank	Weight	Rank	Weight	Rank
Francisco Mosquera	–61 kg	132	1	170	1	302	1st place, gold medalist(s)
Jhon Serna	–61 kg	127	2	170	1	297	2nd place, silver medalist(s)
Óscar Figueroa	–67 kg	135	2	No mark		DNF	
Luis Javier Mosquera	–73 kg	150	2	175	2	325	2nd place, silver medalist(s)
Brayan Rodallegas	–81 kg	167	1	196	2	363	1st place, gold medalist(s)
Jhonatan Rivas	–96 kg	175	2	210	1	385	1st place, gold medalist(s)

Women

Athlete	Event	Snatch		Clearn & jerk		Total	
Athlete	Event	Weight	Rank	Weight	Rank	Weight	Rank
Ana Segura	–49 kg	83	2	105	2	188	2nd place, silver medalist(s)
Yenny Sinisterra	–55 kg	94	2	110	3	204	2nd place, silver medalist(s)
María Lobón	–59 kg	97	1	124	1	221	1st place, gold medalist(s)
Rosivé Silgado	–59 kg	93	5	No mark		DNF	
Mercedes Pérez	–64 kg	105	1	130	1	235	1st place, gold medalist(s)
Leydi Solís	–76 kg	105	4	135	3	240	4

== Wrestling ==
Key:
- VT – Victory by fall.
- PP – Decision by points – the loser with technical points.
- PO – Decision by points – the loser without technical points.
- SP – Technical superiority – the loser with technical points and a margin of victory of at least 9 (Greco-Roman) or 10 (freestyle) points.
- ST – Great superiority – the loser without technical points and a margin of victory of at least 8 (Greco-Roman) or 10 (freestyle) points.
- VA – Decision by withdrawal

Men

Athlete	Event	Round of 16	Quarterfinal	Semifinal	Final / BM	
Athlete	Event	Opposition Result	Opposition Result	Opposition Result	Opposition Result	Rank
Óscar Tigreros	Freestyle 57 kg	—N/a	Ramos (PER); W 10–0	Ramírez (DOM); L 4–9	Capellan (CAN); L 7–8	5
Hernán Guzmán	Freestyle 74 kg	—N/a	Balfour (CAN); L 4–12	Did not advance		
Carlos Izquierdo	Freestyle 86 kg	Bye	Ambrocio (PER); W 6–4	Ceballos (VEN); L 0–10	Anguiano (MEX); W 6–5	3rd place, bronze medalist(s)
Dicther Toro	Greco-Roman 60 kg	—N/a	Hafizov (USA); W 8–3	Pérez (MEX); W 9–0	Montaño (ECU); L 1–10	2nd place, silver medalist(s)
Jair Cuero	Greco-Roman 77 kg	Bye	Smith (USA); L 1–4	Did not advance	Bronze medal contest Benítez (MEX); W 5–1	3rd place, bronze medalist(s)
Carlos Muñoz	Greco-Roman 87 kg	Bye	Barreiro (CAN); W 9–0	Leyva (MEX); L 3–6	Bronze medal contest Almendra (PAN); L 1–2	5
Óscar Loango	Greco-Roman 97 kg	—N/a	Mejía (HON); L 0–7	Did not advance		

Women

Athlete	Event	Round of 16	Quarterfinal	Semifinal	Final / BM	
Athlete	Event	Opposition Result	Opposition Result	Opposition Result	Opposition Result	Rank
Carolina Castillo	50 kg	—N/a	Conder (USA); L 0–10	Não avançou	Bronze medal contest Barbosa (BRA); W 5–2	3rd place, bronze medalist(s)
Dannia Figueroa	53 kg	—N/a	Montero (CUB); L 0–8	Did not advance		
Jackeline Rentería	62 kg	—N/a	Antes (ECU); W 3–0	Yambo (PUR); W 12–0	Miracle (USA); L 0–12	2nd place, silver medalist(s)
Andrea Olaya	76 kg	—N/a	Portillo (ESA); W 3–0	Di Stasio (CAN); L 0–9	Bronze medal contest Lázaro (VEN); W 4–0	3rd place, bronze medalist(s)
