= Cycling at the 2019 Pan American Games – Women's road time trial =

Women's road time trial at the 2019 Pan American Games
- Venue: Circuito San Miguel
- Dates: August 7
- Competitors: 21 from 14 nations
- Winning time: 23:36.51

Medalists
| Gold medal | Chloé Dygert; United States |
| Silver medal | Teniel Campbell; Trinidad and Tobago |
| Bronze medal | Laurie Jussaume; Canada |

The women's road time trial competition of the cycling events at the 2019 Pan American Games was held on August 7 at the Circuito San Miguel.

== Schedule ==
| Date | Time | Round |
|---|---|---|
| August 7, 2019 | 9:45 | Final |

== Results ==
21 riders from 14 countries was started

| Rank | Rider | Nation | Time |
|---|---|---|---|
| 1st place, gold medalist(s) | Chloé Dygert | United States | 23:36.51 |
| 2nd place, silver medalist(s) | Teniel Campbell | Trinidad and Tobago | 24:50.24 |
| 3rd place, bronze medalist(s) | Laurie Jussaume | Canada | 26:27.15 |
| 4 | Jeidi Pradera | Cuba | 26:29.87 |
| 5 | Miriam Brouwer | Canada | 26:34.41 |
| 6 | Anabel Yapura | Argentina | 26:36.69 |
| 7 | Caitlin Conyers | Bermuda | 26:39.45 |
| 8 | Arlenis Sierra | Cuba | 26:39.87 |
| 9 | Aranza Villalón | Chile | 26:45.07 |
| 10 | Jessica Bonilla | Mexico | 26:51.94 |
| 11 | Lina Hernández | Colombia | 26:53.73 |
| 12 | Miryam Núñez | Ecuador | 27:23.87 |
| 13 | Lisa Groothuesheidkamp | Aruba | 27:29.76 |
| 14 | Lina Rojas | Colombia | 27:36.40 |
| 15 | Fiorella Malaspina | Argentina | 27:49.91 |
| 16 | Alexi Costa | Trinidad and Tobago | 27:53.69 |
| 17 | Wilmarys Moreno | Venezuela | 28:27.65 |
| 18 | Romina Medrano | Peru | 28:58.71 |
| 19 | Nicole Mitchell | Bermuda | 29:43.02 |
| 20 | Micaela Sarabia | Bolivia | 30:07.63 |
| 21 | Ariadna Herrera | Ecuador | 30:15.12 |
