= 2016 UCI Road World Championships – Women's junior time trial =

Women's time trial
2016 UCI Road World Championships
- Time trial Rainbow jersey

Race details
- Dates: 10 October 2016
- Stages: 1
- Distance: 13.7 km (8.513 mi)
- Winning time: 18' 21.77"

Medalists
	Gold	Karlijn Swinkels (Netherlands)
	Silver	Lisa Morzenti (Italy)
	Bronze	Juliette Labous (France)

The Women's junior time trial of the 2016 UCI Road World Championships took place in and around in Doha, Qatar on 10 October 2016. The course of the race was 13.7 km (8.5 mi).

The gold medal was won by Dutch rider Karlijn Swinkels, who became the first Dutch rider to win the gold medal in the event. Swinkels finished 7.35 seconds ahead of her closest competitor, European champion Lisa Morzenti of Italy. The bronze medal went to Juliette Labous from France, 14 seconds down on Morzenti and 21.35 seconds in arrears of Swinkels.

== Qualification ==
=== Qualification for the event ===
All National Federations were allowed to enter four riders for the race, with a maximum of two riders to start. In addition to this number, the outgoing World Champion and the current continental champions were also able to take part.

Champion	Name	Note
Oceanian Champion	Mikayla Harvey (NZL)	
Pan American Champion	Tatiana Dueñas (COL)	
African Champion	Donia Rashwan Mahmoud (EGY)	Did not compete
Asian Champion	Ting Ting Chang (TPE)	Did not compete

== Schedule ==
All times are in Arabia Standard Time (UTC+3).

Date	Time	Event
10 October 2016	09:30–10:40	Women's junior time trial

== Final classification ==
Rank	Rider	Time
1	(Netherlands) Karlijn Swinkels (NED)	18' 21.77"
2	(Italy) Lisa Morzenti (ITA)	+ 7.35"
3	(France) Juliette Labous (FRA)	+ 21.35"
4	(United States) Skylar Schneider (USA)	+ 30.03"
5	(United States) Hannah Arensman (USA)	+ 34.05"
6	(Germany) Franziska Brauße (DEU)	+ 34.26"
7	(Denmark) Simone Eg (DNK)	+ 38.41"
8	(Italy) Alessia Vigilia (ITA)	+ 42.13"
9	(Australia) Madeleine Fasnacht (AUS)	+ 43.60"
10	(Italy) Elena Pirrone (ITA)	+ 43.67"
11	(New Zealand) Madeleine Park (NZL)	+ 48.87"
12	(Netherlands) Maaike Boogaard (NED)	+ 50.59"
13	(Norway) Susanne Andersen (NOR)	+ 52.52"
14	(Poland) Aurela Nerlo (POL)	+ 1' 01.32"
15	(Australia) Chloe Moran (AUS)	+ 1' 02.21"
16	(Germany) Christa Riffel (DEU)	+ 1' 02.27"
17	(Denmark) Johanne Märcher (DNK)	+ 1' 04.42"
18	(Russia) Karina Kasenova (RUS)	+ 1' 08.43"
19	(Colombia) Tatiana Dueñas (COL)	+ 1' 13.30"
20	(Spain) Sara Martín (ESP)	+ 1' 13.53"
21	(Slovenia) Karin Penko (SLO)	+ 1' 16.72"
22	(Switzerland) Léna Mettraux (SUI)	+ 1' 17.30"
23	(France) Clara Copponi (FRA)	+ 1' 21.71"
24	(Poland) Wiktoria Pikulik (POL)	+ 1' 22.01"
25	(Canada) Laurie Jussaume (CAN)	+ 1' 29.95"
26	(Mexico) Andrea Ramírez (MEX)	+ 1' 36.60"
27	(Canada) Erin Attwell (CAN)	+ 1' 38.18"
28	(Luxembourg) Anne-Sophie Harsch (LUX)	+ 1' 39.12"
29	(Spain) Miriam Gardachal (ESP)	+ 1' 41.77"
30	(Czech Republic) Adéla Šafářová (CZE)	+ 1' 47.11"
31	(New Zealand) Mikayla Harvey (NZL)	+ 2' 01.93"
32	(South Africa) Lynette Benson (RSA)	+ 2' 04.98"
33	(Mexico) Yulin Águila (MEX)	+ 2' 08.53"
34	(Slovenia) Katja Kerpan (SLO)	+ 2' 10.78"
35	(Japan) Misuzu Shimoyama (JPN)	+ 2' 37.78"
36	(South Africa) Nicolene Marais (RSA)	+ 2' 51.92"
37	(Thailand) Chaniporn Batriya (THA)	+ 2' 52.84"
38	(China) Yang Jiahuan (CHN)	+ 3' 31.22"
39	(Thailand) Kanyarat Kesthonglang (THA)	+ 3' 34.05"
40	(China) Chang Yue (CHN)	+ 3' 59.63"
