= Cycling at the 2019 Pan American Games – Women's keirin =

Women's keirin at the 2019 Pan American Games
- Venue: Velodrome
- Dates: August 2
- Competitors: 11 from 11 nations

Medalists
Gold medal	Martha Bayona	Colombia
Silver medal	Lisandra Guerra	Cuba
Bronze medal	Yuli Verdugo	Mexico

The women's keirin competition of the cycling events at the 2019 Pan American Games was held on August 2 at the Velodrome.

== Schedule ==
Date	Time	Round
August 2, 2019	11:24	First round
August 2, 2019	12:15	First round repechage
August 2, 2019	19:17	Finals

== Results ==
=== First round ===
First 2 riders in each heat qualify to Final 1-6 and the others to First Round Repechage.

==== Heat 1 ====
Rank	Name	Nation	Notes
1	Kelsey Mitchell	Canada	Q
2	Joanne Rodríguez	Guatemala	Q
3	Lisandra Guerra	Cuba	
4	Natalia Vera	Argentina	
5	Micaela Sarabia	Bolivia	

==== Heat 2 ====
Rank	Name	Nation	Notes
1	Martha Bayona	Colombia	Q
2	Yuli Verdugo	Mexico	Q
3	Dahlia Palmer	Jamaica	
4	Anany Muñoz	Chile	
5	Katheryne Cargua	Ecuador	
6	Estephany Valdivia	Peru	

=== First round repechage ===
First 2 riders qualify to Final 1-6

Rank	Name	Nation	Notes
1	Lisandra Guerra	Cuba	Q
2	Natalia Vera	Argentina	Q
3	Dahlia Palmer	Jamaica	
4	Anany Muñoz	Chile	
5	Katheryne Cargua	Ecuador	
6	Estephany Valdivia	Peru	
7	Micaela Sarabia	Bolivia	

=== Finals ===
The final classification is determined in the medal finals.

==== Finals 7–12 ====
Rank	Name	Nation	Notes
7	Dahlia Palmer	Jamaica	
8	Anany Muñoz	Chile	
9	Estephany Valdivia	Peru	
	Micaela Sarabia	Bolivia	DNS
	Katheryne Cargua	Ecuador	DNS

==== Finals 1–6 ====
Rank	Name	Nation	Notes
1st place, gold medalist(s)	Martha Bayona	Colombia	
2nd place, silver medalist(s)	Lisandra Guerra	Cuba	
3rd place, bronze medalist(s)	Yuli Verdugo	Mexico	
4	Joanne Rodríguez	Guatemala	
5	Kelsey Mitchell	Canada	
6	Natalia Vera	Argentina	
