= Cycling at the 2019 Pan American Games – Women's cross-country =

Women's cross-country at the 2019 Pan American Games
- Venue: Morro Solar
- Dates: July 28
- Competitors: 14 from 9 nations
- Winning time: 1:30:45

Medalists
Gold medal	Daniela Campuzano	Mexico
Silver medal	Sofia Gomez-Villafañe	Argentina
Bronze medal	Jaqueline Mourão	Brazil

The women's cross-country competition of the cycling events at the 2019 Pan American Games was held on July 28 at the Morro Solar.

== Schedule ==
Date	Time	Round
July 28, 2019	9:00	Final

== Results ==
Rank	Rider	Nation	Time
1st place, gold medalist(s)	Daniela Campuzano	Mexico	1:30:45
2nd place, silver medalist(s)	Sofia Gomez-Villafañe	Argentina	1:31:06
3rd place, bronze medalist(s)	Jaqueline Mourão	Brazil	1:31:12
4	Laura Abril	Colombia	1:31:33
5	Agustina Apaza	Argentina	1:33:56
6	Miryan Nuñez	Ecuador	1:34:15
7	Michela Molina	Ecuador	1:34:45
8	Milagro Mena	Costa Rica	1:35:47
9	Adriana Rojas	Costa Rica	1:37:25
10	Leidy Mera	Colombia	1:39:46
11	Ludisneli Fleitas	Cuba	1:40:13
12	Ariadna Gutiérrez	Mexico	1:40:24
	María Castro González	Chile	DNF
	Lucero Rubio	Peru	DNF
