= Laurie Jussaume =

Canadian cyclist

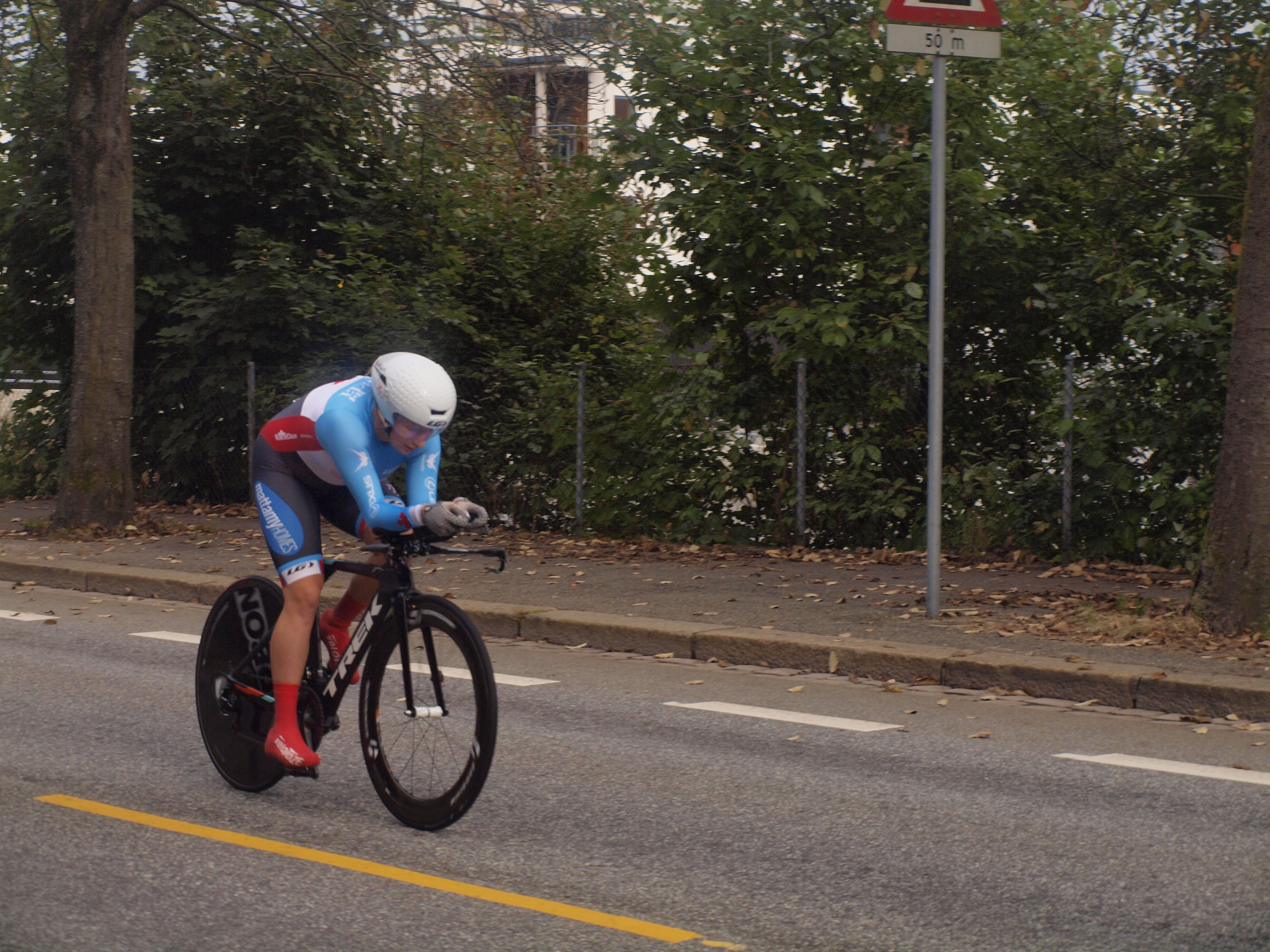
- Jussaume in 2017

Personal information
- Born: 7 September 1999 (age 26)

Sport
- Country: Canada
Medal record
Pan American Games
Silver medal – second place	2019 Lima	Team pursuit
Bronze medal – third place	2019 Lima	Time trial
Pan American Championships
Bronze medal – third place	2018 Aguascalientes	Team pursuit

Laurie Jussaume (born 7 September 1999) is a Canadian cyclist.

Jussaume won a bronze medal at the 2017–18 UCI Track Cycling World Cup and represented Canada in the junior events at the UCI Road World Championships in 2016 and 2017.

She competed at the 2018 Pan American Track Cycling Championships, where she won a bronze medal in the team pursuit, and at the 2019 Pan American Games, where she won a silver medal in the women's team pursuit event and a bronze medal in the women's time trial event.
