= Mayra Rocha =

Mexican cyclist (born 1988)

Personal information
- Nickname: Mayra del Rocío Rocha
- Born: 26 October 1988 (age 38) Aguascalientes, Mexico

Cycling career
- Sport: Cycling
- Discipline: Road cycling

Professional team
- 2013: GSD Gestion-Kallisto
Medal record
Representing Mexico
Women's track cycling
Pan American Games
Bronze medal – third place	2015 Toronto	Team pursuit
Pan American Championships
Silver medal – second place	2016 Aguascalientes	Team pursuit
Silver medal – second place	2017 Couva	Team pursuit
Bronze medal – third place	2017 Couva	Madison
Bronze medal – third place	2018 Aguascalientes	Scratch
Bronze medal – third place	2019 Cochabamba	Team pursuit

Mayra del Rocío Rocha (born 26 October 1988 in Aguascalientes) is a road cyclist from Mexico. She participated at the 2012 UCI Road World Championships.

== Major results ==
2013
2nd Team Pursuit, Copa Internacional de Pista (with Íngrid Drexel, Ana María Hernandez and Erika Haydee Varela Huerta)
2014
2nd Team Pursuit, Central American and Caribbean Games (with Jessica Bonilla, Íngrid Drexel and Yareli Salazar)
2nd Points Race, Copa Internacional de Pista
2015
3rd Team Pursuit, Pan American Games (with Sofía Arreola, Íngrid Drexel and Yareli Salazar)
2016
2nd Team Pursuit, Pan American Track Championships (with Jessica Bonilla, Sofía Arreola and Yareli Salazar)
