= Íngrid Drexel =

Mexican racing cyclist (born 1993)

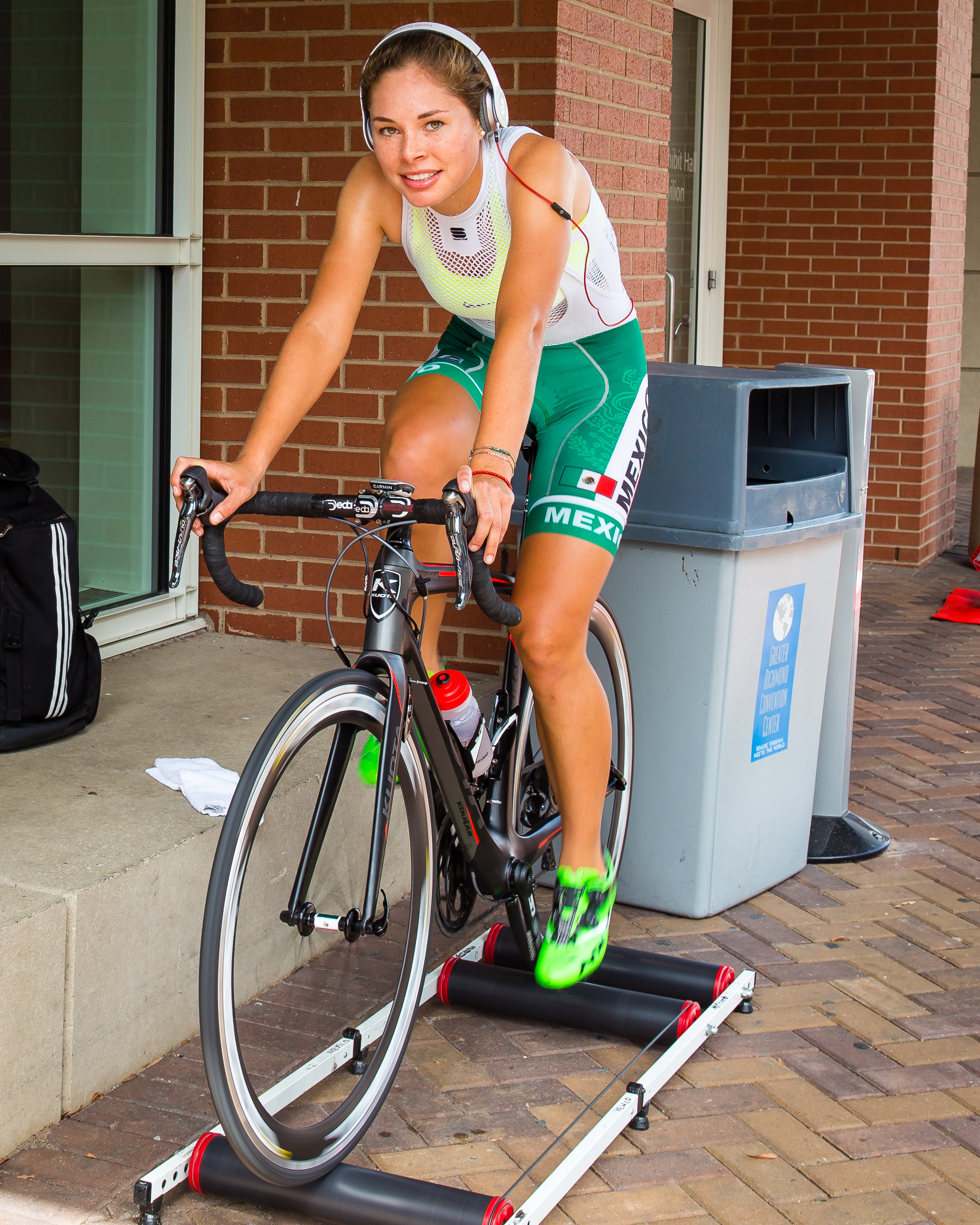
- Drexel at the 2015 UCI Road World Championships

Personal information
- Full name: Íngrid Drexel Clouthier
- Born: 28 July 1993 (age 33) Monterrey, Mexico

Cycling career
- Sport: Cycling
- Disciplines: Road; Track
- Role: Rider
- Rider type: All-rounder

Professional teams
- 2013: Pasta Zara–Cogeas
- 2014: Forno d'Asolo–Astute
- 2015–2016: Astana–Acca Due O
- 2017–2019: Tibco–Silicon Valley Bank
Medal record
Representing Mexico
Women's track cycling
Pan American Games
Bronze medal – third place	2015 Toronto	Team pursuit
Pan American Championships
Bronze medal – third place	2011 Medellin	Scratch
Women's road cycling
Pan American Championships
Gold medal – first place	2013 Zacatecas	Time trial
Bronze medal – third place	2016 San Cristóbal	Time trial

Íngrid Drexel Clouthier (born 28 July 1993) is a Mexican road bicycle racer, who last rode for UCI Women's Team Tibco–Silicon Valley Bank.

Born in Monterrey, Nuevo León, Drexel competed at the 2012 Summer Olympics in the Women's road race, but finished outside the time limit. She is a representative of the Nuevo León cycling team.

== Personal life ==
Drexel is married to Mexican footballer Gibrán Lajud, and the couple have one child – a son – born in 2020.

== Major results ==
2010
1st Time trial, Pan American Junior Road Championships
2011
3rd Scratch, Pan American Track Championships
2012
National Road Championships

1st Time trial
1st Road race

2013
Pan American Road Championships

1st Time trial
4th Road race

National Road Championships

1st Time trial
1st Road race

Copa Internacional de Pista

1st Points race
2nd Team pursuit (with Mayra Rocha, Ana María Hernandez and Erika Varela)

2014
Central American and Caribbean Games

2nd Team pursuit (with Jessica Bonilla, Mayra Rocha and Lizbeth Salazar)
6th Time trial

National Road Championships

3rd Time trial
4th Road race

Pan American Road Championships

6th Road race
7th Time trial

2015
National Road Championships

1st Time trial
2nd Road race

1st Points race, Copa Cuba de Pista
Pan American Games

3rd Team pursuit (with Sofía Arreola, Mayra Rocha and Lizbeth Salazar)
6th Time trial

5th Time trial, Pan American Road Championships
7th Overall Vuelta Internacional Femenina a Costa Rica
2016
2nd Overall Vuelta Internacional Femenina a Costa Rica
2nd Copa Federación Venezolana de Ciclismo
Pan American Road Championships

3rd Time trial
4th Road race

3rd Grand Prix de Venezuela
2017
National Road Championships

1st Time trial
1st Road race

7th Overall Joe Martin Stage Race
8th Grand Prix Cycliste de Gatineau
8th Winston-Salem Cycling Classic
8th GP de Plouay – Bretagne
2018
1st Time trial, National Road Championships
4th Grand Prix Cycliste de Gatineau
