= Cycling at the 2019 Pan American Games – Men's road time trial =

Men's road time trial at the 2019 Pan American Games
- Venue: Circuito San Miguel
- Dates: August 7
- Competitors: 20 from 14 nations
- Winning time: 44:22.71

Medalists
Gold medal	Daniel Martínez; Colombia
Silver medal	Magno Nazaret; Brazil
Bronze medal	José Luis Rodríguez Aguilar; Chile

The men's road time trial competition of the cycling events at the 2019 Pan American Games was held on August 7 at the Circuito San Miguel.

== Schedule ==
Date	Time	Round
August 7, 2019	12:15	Final

== Results ==
20 riders from 14 countries was started

Rank	Rider	Nation	Time
1st place, gold medalist(s)	Daniel Martínez	Colombia	44:22.71
2nd place, silver medalist(s)	Magno Nazaret	Brazil	46:17.44
3rd place, bronze medalist(s)	José Luis Rodríguez Aguilar	Chile	46:25.51
4	Brandon Rivera	Colombia	46:48.73
5	Christofer Jurado	Panama	47:01.65
6	Orluis Aular	Venezuela	47:04.25
7	René Corella	Mexico	47:37.88
8	Ignacio Prado	Mexico	47:39.01
9	Manuel Rodas	Guatemala	47:42.39
10	Rubén Ramos	Argentina	48:09.85
11	Diego Ferreyra	Chile	48:27.62
12	Pedro Portuondo	Cuba	48:43.29
13	Rodrigo Nascimento	Brazil	48:49.65
14	Hugo Ruíz Callé	Peru	49:25.81
15	Luis López Nolasco	Honduras	49:42.18
16	Tyler Cole	Trinidad and Tobago	50:14.88
17	Royner Navarro	Peru	50:19.22
18	Hillard Cijntje	Aruba	50:39.76
19	Pablo Mudarra	Costa Rica	52:29.47
20	Jovian Gomez	Trinidad and Tobago	55:25.84
