= 2018 Pan American Track Cycling Championships =

- Venue: Aguascalientes, Mexico
- Date(s): August 29 – September 2, 2018
- Velodrome: Aguascalientes Bicentenary Velodrome
- Events: 20

The 2018 Pan American Track Championships took place at the Aguascalientes Bicentenary Velodrome, in Aguascalientes, Mexico, from August 29 until September 2, 2018. The event served as a qualifier for the 2019 Pan American Games.

== Medal summary ==
=== Men ===
Event	Gold	Silver	Bronze
Sprint	Hugo Barrette; Canada	Nicholas Paul; Trinidad and Tobago	Kevin Quintero; Colombia
1 km time trial	Santiago Ramírez; Colombia	Kevin Quintero; Colombia	Nicholas Paul; Trinidad and Tobago
Keirin	Hugo Barrette; Canada	Santiago Ramírez; Colombia	Kevin Quintero; Colombia
Scratch	Adrian Hegyvary; United States	Ivan Carbajal; Mexico	Antonio Cabrera; Chile
Points race	Felipe Penaloza; Chile	Jorge Luis Montenegro; Ecuador	Rubén Ramos; Argentina
Individual pursuit	Ashton Lambie; United States	Gavin Hoover; United States	Luis Villalobos; Mexico
Omnium	Ángel Pulgar; Venezuela	Carlos Quishpe; Ecuador	Ignacio Prado; Mexico
Madison	United States; Daniel Holloway; Adrian Hegyvary	Mexico; Ignacio Sarabia; José Aguirre	Chile; Felipe Penaloza; Antonio Cabrera
Team sprint	Trinidad and Tobago; Kwesi Browne; Njisane Phillip; Nicholas Paul	Colombia; Rubén Murillo; Santiago Ramírez; Kevin Quintero	Brazil; Flávio Cipriano; Kacio Freitas; João Vitor da Silva
Team pursuit	United States; Ashton Lambie; Eric Young; Colby Lange; Gavin Hoover	Colombia; Juan Esteban Arango; Brayan Sánchez; Carlos Tobon; Marvin Angarita	Mexico; José Aguirre; Ignacio Prado; Edibaldo Maldonado; Ignacio Sarabia

=== Women ===
Event	Gold	Silver	Bronze
Sprint	Luz Gaxiola; Mexico	Jessica Salazar; Mexico	Martha Bayona; Colombia
500 m time trial	Jessica Salazar; Mexico	Luz Gaxiola; Mexico	Martha Bayona; Colombia
Keirin	Martha Bayona; Colombia	Lauriane Genest; Canada	Amelia Walsh; Canada
Individual pursuit	Kelly Catlin; United States	Marlies Mejías; Cuba	Jennifer Wheeler; United States
Points race	Jennifer Valente; United States	Jessica Bonilla; Mexico	Marlies Mejías; Cuba
Scratch	Jennifer Valente; United States	Marlies Mejías; Cuba	Mayra Rocha; Mexico
Omnium	Jennifer Valente; United States	Yarely Salazar; Mexico	Lina Hernández; Colombia
Madison	Mexico; Yarely Salazar; Sofía Arreola	Canada; Allison Beveridge; Stephanie Roorda	United States; Kimberly Geist; Christina Birch
Team sprint	Mexico; Luz Gaxiola; Yuli Verdugo; Jessica Salazar	United States; Mandy Marquardt; Madalyn Godby	Canada; Lauriane Genest; Amelia Walsh
Team pursuit	United States; Jennifer Valente; Kimberly Geist; Kelly Catlin; Christina Birch	Mexico; Yarely Salazar; Ana Teresa Casas; Jessica Bonilla; Brenda Santoyo	Canada; Maggie Coles-Lyster; Laurie Jussaume; Devaney Collier; Miriam Brouwer

== Medal table ==
Rank	Nation	Gold	Silver	Bronze	Total
1	United States (USA)	9	2	2	13
2	Mexico (MEX)	4	7	4	15
3	Colombia (COL)	2	4	5	11
4	Canada (CAN)	2	2	3	7
5	Trinidad and Tobago (TTO)	1	1	1	3
6	Chile (CHI)	1	0	2	3
7	Venezuela (VEN)	1	0	0	1
8	Cuba (CUB)	0	2	1	3
9	Ecuador (ECU)	0	2	0	2
10	Argentina (ARG)	0	0	1	1
10	Brazil (BRA)	0	0	1	1
Totals (11 entries)		20	20	20	60
