= Teniel Campbell =

Trinidadian cyclist (born 1997)

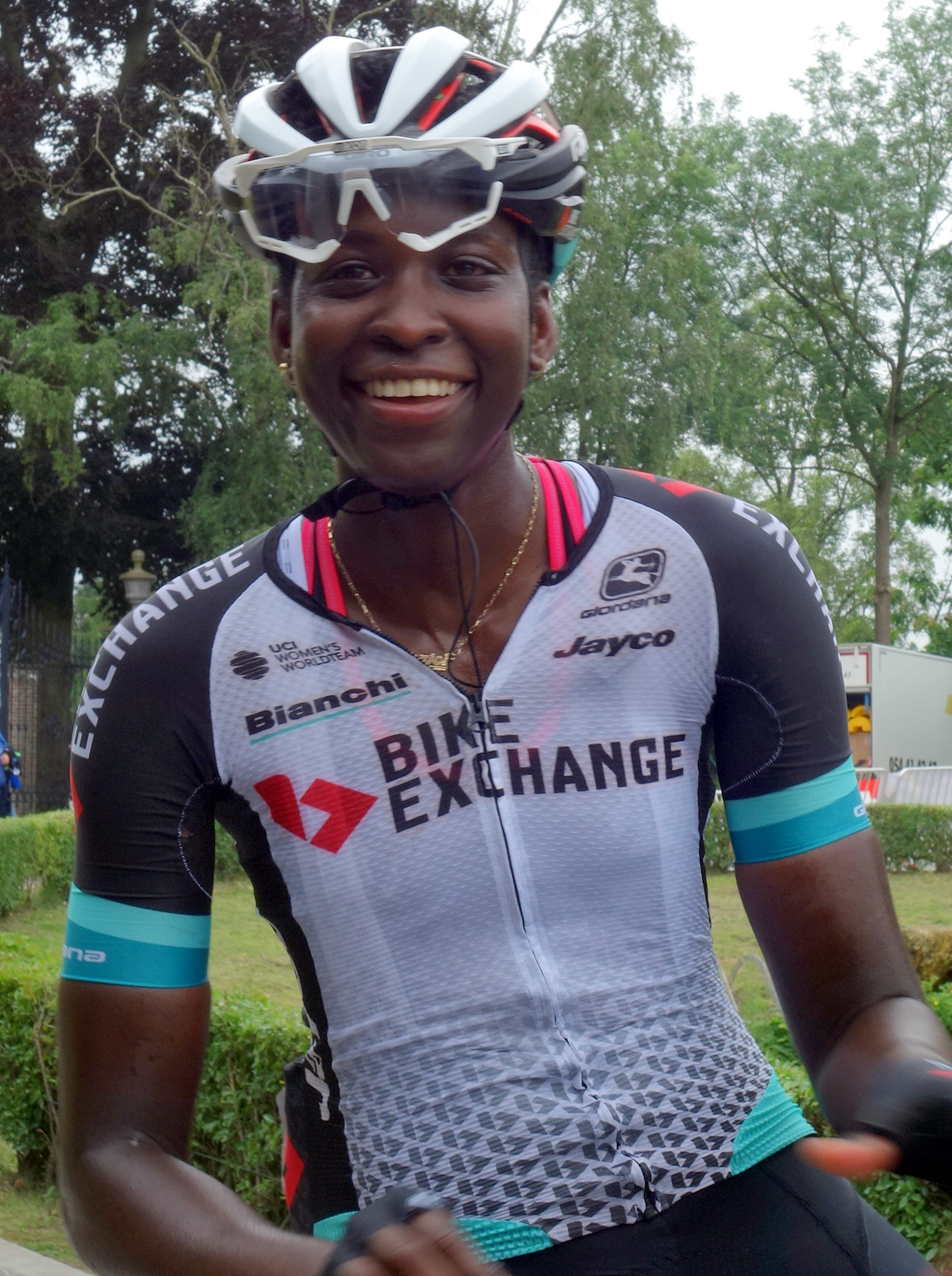
- Campbell in 2021

Personal information
- Full name: Teniel Campbell
- Born: 23 September 1997 (age 29) Hardbargain, Trinidad and Tobago
- Height: 6 ft 1 in (1.85 m)

Cycling career
- Sport: Cycling
- Current team: Révvi-EGS Group-Velopro
- Discipline: Road
- Role: Rider
- Rider type: Sprinter

Amateur teams
- 2018: UCI WCC Women's Team
- 2018: Cogeas–Mettler Pro Cycling Team (stagiaire)
- 2026: Révvi-EGS Group-Velopro

Professional teams
- 2019: WCC Team
- 2020: Valcar–Travel & Service
- 2021–2024: Team BikeExchange
- 2025: Smurfit Westrock Cycling Team
Medal record
Women's road cycling
Representing Trinidad and Tobago
Pan American Games
Silver medal – second place	2019 Lima	Road race
Silver medal – second place	2019 Lima	Time trial
Pan American Championships
Bronze medal – third place	2019 Ixmiquilpan	Road race
Bronze medal – third place	2021 Santo Domingo	Road race
Central American and Caribbean Games
Silver medal – second place	2026 Santo Domingo	Road race
Bronze medal – third place	2026 Santo Domingo	Time trial
Women's track cycling
Pan American Championships
Gold medal – first place	2022 Lima	Points race
Gold medal – first place	2025 Asunción	Points race
Gold medal – first place	2026 Santiago	Scratch
Silver medal – second place	2022 Lima	Individual pursuit
Bronze medal – third place	2022 Lima	Elimination race
Bronze medal – third place	2025 Asunción	Elimination race
Central American and Caribbean Games
Bronze medal – third place	2026 Santo Domingo	Madison
Bronze medal – third place	2026 Santo Domingo	Team sprint

Teniel Campbell (born 23 September 1997) is a racing cyclist from Trinidad and Tobago, who currently rides for Révvi-EGS Group-Velopro team. In 2018, she won four medals at the 2018 Central American and Caribbean Games. The next year, she won the U23 individual time trial at the Pan American Road and Track Championships. She also won both stages, the general classification, the points classification and the youth classification in the Kreiz Breizh Elites Dames.

== Major results ==
2014
2nd Time trial, National Junior Road Championships

2015
National Track Championships

1st Individual pursuit
2nd Keirin
2nd Sprint
3rd 500m time trial

2016
National Road Championships

1st Road race
1st Time trial

3rd Keirin, National Track Championships
Arima Easter International Grand Prix

1st Keirin
3rd Sprint

2018
Central American and Caribbean Games

1st Road race
4th Time trial

6th Diamond Tour
10th GP Sofie Goos

2019
Pan American Under-23 Road Championships

1st Time trial
4th Road race

1st Overall Kreiz Breizh Elites Dames

1st Points classification
1st Young rider classification
1st Stages 1 & 2

Pan American Games

2nd Road race
2nd Time trial

2nd Overall The Princess Maha Chakri Sirindhorn's Cup Tour of Thailand

1st Stage 2

5th Nokere Koerse voor Dames
5th Flanders Ladies Classic - Sofie De Vuyst
6th Chrono Champenois

2020
3rd Vuelta a la Comunitat Valenciana Feminas
5th Omloop van het Hageland

2021
1st Stage 6 Tour Cycliste Féminin International de l'Ardèche

2022
Caribbean Road Championships

Time trial

National Road Championships

1st Road Race
1st Time trial
