= Marvin Angarita =

Colombian cyclist (born 1989)

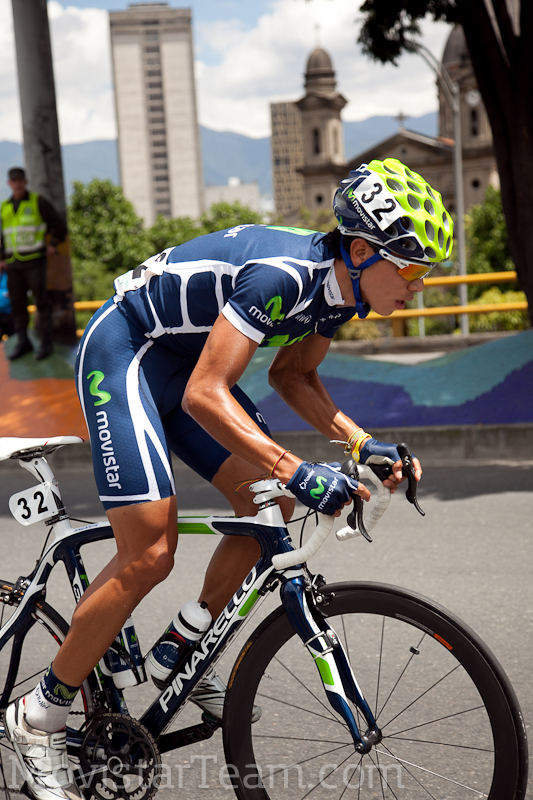

Personal information
- Full name: Marvin Orlando Angarita Reyes
- Born: 11 April 1989 (age 37) Barrancabermeja, Santander, Colombia

Cycling career
- Sport: Cycling
- Disciplines: Road; Track
- Role: Rider
- Rider type: Sprinter (road); Pursuitist (track)

Amateur teams
- 2009: GW–Shimano
- 2010: Multi Repuestos Bosa–Carnaval de Pollo
- 2013–2014: Movistar Team América
- 2016: Multi Repuestos Bosa–Carnaval de Pollo

Professional teams
- 2011–2012: Movistar Continental Team
- 2012: Movistar Team (stagiaire)
- 2015: Movistar Team América
- 2017: Equipo Bolivia
- 2017: Bicicletas Strongman
Medal record
Representing Colombia
Men's track cycling
Pan American Games
Silver medal – second place	2019 Lima	Team pursuit
Pan American Championships
Silver medal – second place	2018 Aguascalientes	Team pursuit

Marvin Orlando Angarita Reyes (born 11 April 1989 in Barrancabermeja, Santander) is a Colombian cyclist. He made his professional debut in 2011, with the Movistar Continental Team.

In 2019, Angarita won a silver medal at the Pan American Games as part of the Colombian team pursuit squad.

== Major results ==
2010
1st Stage 4 Clásico RCN
2011
1st Road race, National Under-23 Road Championships
Vuelta a Venezuela

1st Stages 2, 8b, 11 & 12

1st Stage 4 Clásico RCN
2012
Vuelta al Mundo Maya

1st Stages 7 & 8

2013
Vuelta al Ecuador

1st Stages 5 & 7

2014
1st Sprints classification Vuelta a Colombia
2019
2nd Team pursuit, Pan American Games
