= Maggie Coles-Lyster =

Canadian cyclist (born 1999)

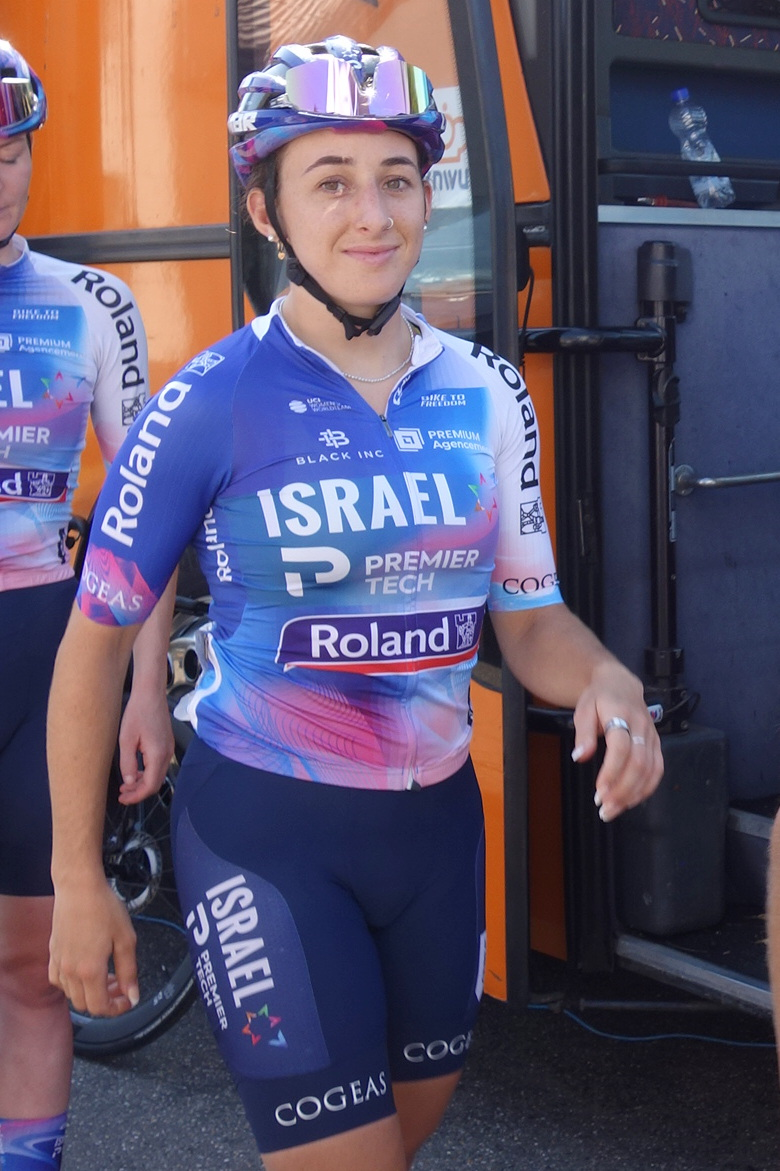
- Coles-Lyster in 2023

Personal information
- Full name: Maggie Coles-Lyster
- Born: 12 February 1999 (age 27) Maple Ridge, British Columbia, Canada

Cycling career
- Sport: Cycling
- Current team: Human Powered Health
- Disciplines: Road; Track
- Role: Rider

Amateur teams
- 2017: Lares–Waowdeals (guest)
- 2018: Macogep–Argon18–Girondins
- 2018: Tag Cycling Race Team (guest)
- 2019: Pickle Juice Pro Cycling

Professional teams
- 2020–2022: DNA Pro Cycling
- 2023: Zaaf Cycling Team
- 2023: Israel–Premier Tech
- 2024: Roland
- 2025–: Human Powered Health
Medal record
Pan American Games
Silver medal – second place	2019 Lima	Team pursuit
Silver medal – second place	2019 Lima	Madison
Pan American Championships
Silver medal – second place	2021 Lima	Omnium
Silver medal – second place	2021 Lima	Points race
Silver medal – second place	2021 Lima	Elimination
Bronze medal – third place	2018 Aguascalientes	Team pursuit
Commonwealth Games
Bronze medal – third place	2026 Glasgow	Elimination

Maggie Coles-Lyster (born 12 February 1999) is a Canadian professional racing cyclist, who currently rides for Human Powered Health.

Coles-Lyster competed at the 2017–18 UCI Track Cycling World Cup where she won a bronze medal in the team pursuit. She also competed at the 2018 Pan American Track Cycling Championships, where she won a bronze medal in the team pursuit event, and at the 2019 Pan American Games where she won silver medals in the team pursuit, and madison events. In 2022 she won gold in the Canadian National Road Race Championships.

In 2020, she came forward with allegations of sexual assault which occurred at a race in the Netherlands in 2017. A formal investigation has been opened by the cycling governing body, the Union Cycliste Internationale.

In 2023, she was a rider on in the ill-fated Zaaf Cycling Team, which disintegrated amidst news of unpaid riders, and ended up being picked-up mid season by Israel–Premier Tech.

== Major results ==
2021
9th Overall Joe Martin Stage Race

1st Young rider classification

2022
1st Road race, National Road Championships
1st Stage 4 Joe Martin Stage Race
5th Road race, Commonwealth Games
2023
4th Tour of Guangxi
8th Scheldeprijs
9th Overall Tour of Chongming Island
2024
5th Ronde de Mouscron
2025
3rd Trofeo Marratxi-Felanitx
7th Ronde de Mouscron
2026
1st Women's Tour Down Under One Day Race
9th Copenhagen Sprint
