= Milena Salcedo =

Colombian cyclist (born 1988)

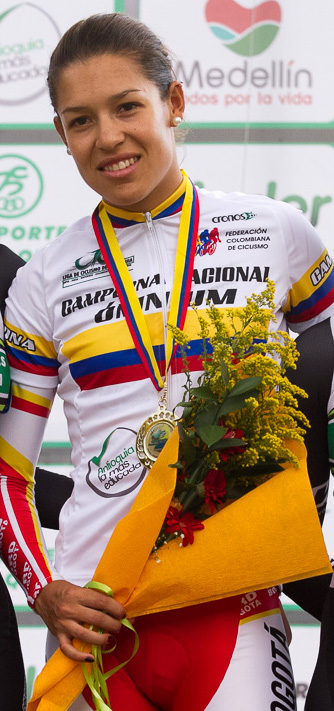
- Salcedo in 2013.

Personal information
- Full name: Jannie Milena Salcedo Zambrano
- Born: 14 May 1988 (age 38) Bogotá, Colombia

Cycling career
- Sport: Cycling
- Disciplines: Road; Track
- Role: Rider

Professional team
- 2019: Swapit–Agolíco
Medal record
Representing Colombia
Women's track cycling
Pan American Games
Bronze medal – third place	2019 Lima	Team pursuit

Jannie Milena Salcedo Zambrano (born 14 May 1988) is a Colombian road and track cyclist, who last rode for UCI Women's Team Swapit–Agolíco. She represented her nation at the 2015 UCI Track Cycling World Championships.

== Major results ==
2014
2nd Omnium, Central American and Caribbean Games
2015
2nd Omnium, Copa Cuba de Pista
2nd Omnium, Marymoor Grand Prix
2018
2nd Road race, National Road Championships
2019
1st Stage 1 Vuelta a Colombia Femenina
6th Road race, Pan American Games
2021
Vuelta Femenina a Guatemala

1st Points classification
1st Stage 2 & 5
