= Lizbeth Salazar =

Mexican cyclist

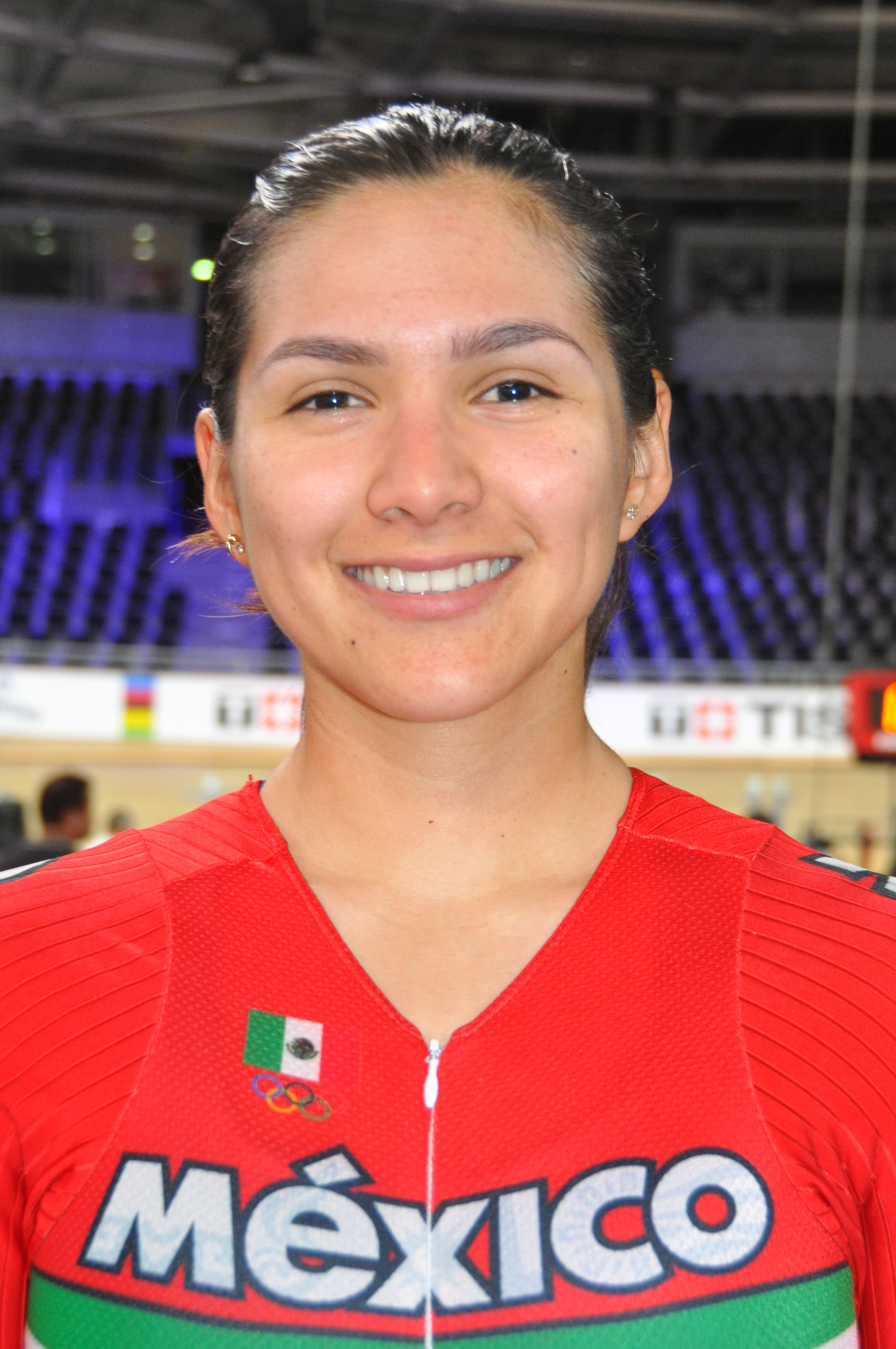
- Salazar in 2020

Personal information
- Full name: Lizbeth Yareli Salazar Vázquez
- Born: 8 December 1996 (age 29) Culiacán, Sinaloa, Mexico

Cycling career
- Sport: Cycling
- Current team: A.R. Monex
- Disciplines: Track; Road
- Role: Rider

Professional teams
- 2018: Swapit–Agolíco
- 2019–: Astana
Medal record
Representing Mexico
Women's track cycling
Pan American Games
Silver medal – second place	2019 Lima	Omnium
Silver medal – second place	2023 Santiago	Team pursuit
Silver medal – second place	2023 Santiago	Madison
Bronze medal – third place	2015 Toronto	Team pursuit
Bronze medal – third place	2019 Lima	Madison
Pan American Championships
Gold medal – first place	2016 Aguascalientes	Scratch
Gold medal – first place	2018 Aguascalientes	Madison
Gold medal – first place	2023 San Juan	Madison
Silver medal – second place	2014 Aguascalientes	Scratch
Silver medal – second place	2016 Aguascalientes	Omnium
Silver medal – second place	2016 Aguascalientes	Team pursuit
Silver medal – second place	2017 Couva	Omnium
Silver medal – second place	2017 Couva	Team pursuit
Silver medal – second place	2018 Aguascalientes	Omnium
Silver medal – second place	2018 Aguascalientes	Team pursuit
Silver medal – second place	2019 Cochabamba	Scratch
Silver medal – second place	2023 San Juan	Team pursuit
Bronze medal – third place	2024 Carson	Team pursuit
Women's road cycling
Pan American Games
Bronze medal – third place	2019 Lima	Road race

Lizbeth Yareli Salazar Vázquez (born 8 December 1996) is a Mexican road and track cyclist, who currently rides for UCI Women's Continental Team A.R. Monex.

She won at the 2014 Central American and Caribbean Games the points race and won silver in the team pursuit and scratch. She represented her nation at the 2015 UCI Track Cycling World Championships.

== Major results ==
2014
Central American and Caribbean Games

1st Points Race
2nd Scratch Race
2nd Team Pursuit (with Jessica Bonilla, Íngrid Drexel and Mayra del Rocio Rocha)

2nd Scratch Race, Pan American Track Championships
2nd Scratch Race, Copa Internacional de Pista (U23)
3rd Scratch Race, Copa Internacional de Pista
2015
3rd Team Pursuit, Pan American Games (with Sofía Arreola, Mayra del Rocio Rocha and Íngrid Drexel)
2016
Pan American Track Championships

1st Scratch Race
2nd Omnium
2nd Team Pursuit (with Sofía Arreola, Jessica Bonilla and Mayra Del Rocio Rocha)

Copa Guatemala de Ciclismo de Pista

1st Points Race
1st Omnium
2nd Scratch Race
3rd 500m Time Trial

2018
2nd Omnium, International Belgian Track Meeting
