= Miriam Brouwer =

Canadian cyclist (born 1991)

Personal information
- Born: 14 November 1991 (age 34) Cambridge, Ontario, Canada

Sport
- Country: Canada
Medal record
Pan American Games
Silver medal – second place	2019 Lima	Team pursuit
Silver medal – second place	2019 Lima	Madison
Pan American Championships
Bronze medal – third place	2018 Aguascalientes	Team pursuit

Miriam Brouwer (born 14 November 1991) is a Canadian cyclist.

Brouwer began cycling when she bought her first bike at the age of 20. She graduated from the University of Toronto in 2016 with a Masters of Science with Honours in Speech and Language Pathology.

She competed at the 2018 Pan American Track Cycling Championships where she won a bronze medal in the team pursuit event and at the 2019 Pan American Games where she won silver medals in the team pursuit and women's madison events.
