= Jessica Bonilla =

Mexican cyclist (born 1996)

Personal information
- Full name: Jessica Bonilla Escapite
- Born: 13 April 1996 (age 30) cd. Juárez, Chihuahua, Mexico

Cycling career
- Sport: Cycling
- Disciplines: Road and Track cycling
Medal record
Women's track cycling
Representing Mexico
Pan American Games
Bronze medal – third place	2019 Lima	Madison
Pan American Track Championships
Silver medal – second place	2016 Aguascalientes	Team pursuit
Silver medal – second place	2017 Couva	Team pursuit
Silver medal – second place	2018 Aguascalientes	Points race
Silver medal – second place	2018 Aguascalientes	Team pursuit
Silver medal – second place	2019 Cochabamba	Madison
Bronze medal – third place	2019 Cochabamba	Team pursuit

Jessica Bonilla Escapite (born 13 April 1996) is a Mexican female road and track cyclist, representing Mexico at international competitions. She won the silver medal at the 2016 Pan American Track Cycling Championships in the team pursuit.

== Major results ==
2013
1st Time trial, National Junior Road Championships
2014
2nd Time trial, Pan American Junior Road Championships
2nd Team Pursuit, Central American and Caribbean Games (with Íngrid Drexel, Mayra del Rocio Rocha and Yareli Salazar)
2016
2nd Time trial, National Road Championships
2nd Team Pursuit, Pan American Track Championships (with Sofía Arreola, Mayra Del Rocio Rocha and Yareli Salazar)
2017
1st Time trial, National Road Championships
Keirin Cup / Madison Cup

2nd Omnium
3rd Scratch Race

2020
2nd Time trial, National Road Championships
