= Erin Attwell =

Canadian cyclist (born 1999)

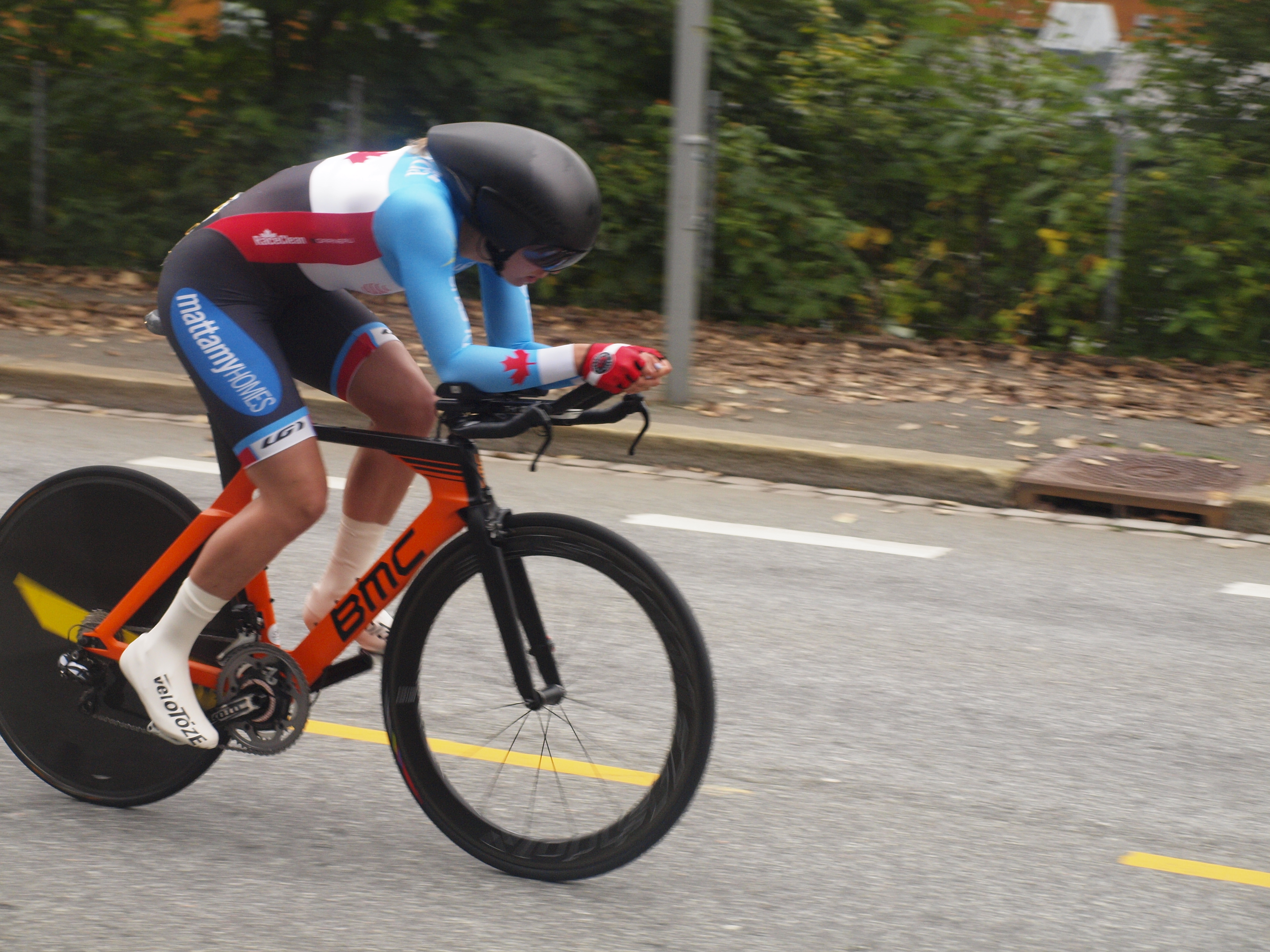
- Attwell at the 2017 UCI World Championships

Personal information
- Nationality: Canadian
- Born: March 12, 1999 (age 27) Victoria, British Columbia, Canada

Sport
- Sport: Cycling
Medal record
Women's Track cycling
Representing Canada
Pan American Games
Silver medal – second place	2019 Lima	Team pursuit
Pan American Championships
Gold medal – first place	2023 San Juan	Team pursuit

Erin Attwell (born March 12, 1999) is a Canadian cyclist competing primarily in the track events.

== Career ==
In June 2019, Attwell was named to Canada's 2019 Pan American Games team. Attwell would go on to win the silver medal in the team pursuit. Attwell was also named to Canada's Pan American Games in 2023, however had to withdraw due to an injury sustained by a vehicle hitting her while training.

In July 2024, Attwell qualified to compete for Canada at the 2024 Summer Olympics in track cycling.
