= Cycling at the 2019 Pan American Games =

- Cycling pictograms
- Venues: Circuito BMX (BMX); Pista de skateboarding (BMX freestyle); Morro Solar (mountain biking); Circuito San Miguel (road); Velodrome (track)
- Dates: July 28 – August 11, 2019
- No. of events: 22 (11 men, 11 women)
- Competitors: 250 from 24 nations

Cycling competitions at the 2019 Pan American Games in Lima, Peru were held at five venues across Lima. The Circuito BMX held the BMX racing competitions, the Pista de skateboarding held the freestyle BMX events. Morro Solar staged the mountain biking competitions, and the Circuito San Miguel staged the road competitions. Finally the velodrome staged the track cycling competitions.

The BMX competitions started on August 7 and finished on the 11th (the last of the games), while mountain biking started on the 28th of July. Road cycling competitions started on the 7th and 10th of August. Track cycling competitions were held between August 1st and 4th.

In 2016, the International Olympic Committee (IOC) made several changes to its sports program, which were subsequently implemented for these games. Included in this was the addition of the BMX freestyle event for the first time to the Pan American Games sports program. Also added was the addition of the Madison event in track cycling for men and women.

22 medal events were contested, four in BMX, two in mountain biking and four in road cycling and 12 in track cycling. Each discipline was gender neutral in terms of events. A total of 250 cyclists qualified to compete at the games.

== Competition schedule ==
The following is the competition schedule for the Cycling competitions:

Q	Qualification	¼	Quarterfinals	½	Semifinals	F	Final

BMX, mountain biking and road cycling
Event↓/Date →	Sun 28	Wed 7	Thu 8	Fri 9			Sat 10	Sun 11	
BMX
Men's BMX racing			Q	¼	½	F			
Women's BMX racing			Q	½		F			
BMX freestyle
Men's BMX freestyle								Q	F
Women's BMX freestyle								Q	F
Mountain biking
Men's cross-country	F								
Women's cross-country	F								
Road cycling
Men's road race							F		
Men's time trial		F							
Women's road race							F		
Women's time trial		F							

== Medal table ==
=== Medal table ===
* Host nation (Peru)

Rank	Nation	Gold	Silver	Bronze	Total
1	United States	7	1	1	9
2	Colombia	5	3	4	12
3	Mexico	3	4	4	11
4	Canada	1	3	1	5
5	Argentina	1	2	3	6
6	Trinidad and Tobago	1	2	0	3
7	Chile	1	1	4	6
8	Venezuela	1	1	2	4
9	Cuba	1	1	1	3
10	Ecuador	1	0	0	1
11	Brazil	0	4	1	5
12	Peru*	0	0	1	1
Totals (12 entries)		22	22	22	66

== Medalists ==
=== BMX ===
Event	Gold	Silver	Bronze
Men's racing	Alfredo Campo; Ecuador	Anderson Souza Filho; Brazil	Federico Villegas; Argentina
Women's racing	Mariana Pajón; Colombia	Paola Reis; Brazil	Stefany Hernández; Venezuela

=== BMX freestyle ===
Event	Gold	Silver	Bronze
Men's freestyle	Daniel Dhers; Venezuela	José Torres; Argentina	Justin Dowell; United States
Women's freestyle	Hannah Roberts; United States	Macarena Perez Grasset; Chile	Agustina Roth; Argentina

=== Mountain biking ===
Event	Gold	Silver	Bronze
Men's cross-country	Gerardo Ulloa; Mexico	Henrique Avancini; Brazil	Martín Vidaurre; Chile
Women's cross-country	Daniela Campuzano; Mexico	Sofía Gómez; Argentina	Jaqueline Mourão; Brazil

=== Road cycling ===
Event	Gold	Silver	Bronze
Men's road race	Maximiliano Richeze; Argentina	Ignacio Prado; Mexico	Bryan Gómez; Colombia
Women's road race	Arlenis Sierra; Cuba	Teniel Campbell; Trinidad and Tobago	Lizbeth Salazar; Mexico
Men's time trial	Daniel Martínez; Colombia	Magno Nazaret; Brazil	José Luis Rodríguez Aguilar; Chile
Women's time trial	Chloé Dygert Owen; United States	Teniel Campbell; Trinidad and Tobago	Laurie Jussaume; Canada

=== Track cycling ===
Event	Gold	Silver	Bronze
Men's team pursuit	United States; John Croom; Gavin Hoover; Ashton Lambie; Adrian Hegyvary	Colombia; Juan Esteban Arango; Marvin Angarita; Jordan Parra; Brayan Sánchez; Bryan Gómez	Chile; Antonio Cabrera; José Luis Rodríguez; Felipe Peñaloza; Pablo Seisdedos
Women's team pursuit	United States; Lily Williams; Christina Birch; Kimberly Geist; Chloé Dygert Owen	Canada; Laurie Jussaume; Maggie Coles-Lyster; Miriam Brouwer; Erin Attwell	Colombia; Milena Salcedo; Lina Rojas; Jessica Parra; Lina Hernández
Men's individual sprint^{[a]}	Nicholas Paul; Trinidad and Tobago	Kevin Quintero; Colombia	Hersony Canelón; Venezuela
Women's individual sprint	Kelsey Mitchell; Canada	Martha Bayona; Colombia	Daniela Gaxiola; Mexico
Men's team sprint^{[b]}	Colombia; Rubén Murillo; Kevin Quintero; Santiago Ramírez	Mexico; Manuel Reséndez; Juan Ruiz; Edgar Verdugo	Peru; Francis Cachique; Robinson Ruiz; Ruben Salinas
Women's team sprint	Mexico; Daniela Gaxiola; Jessica Salazar	Canada; Kelsey Mitchell; Amelia Walsh	Colombia; Martha Bayona; Juliana Gaviria
Men's keirin	Kevin Quintero; Colombia	Hersony Canelón; Venezuela	Leandro Bottasso; Argentina
Women's keirin	Martha Bayona; Colombia	Lisandra Guerra; Cuba	Yuli Verdugo; Mexico
Men's omnium	Daniel Holloway; United States	Ignacio Prado; Mexico	Felipe Peñaloza; Chile
Women's omnium	Jennifer Valente; United States	Lizbeth Salazar; Mexico	Arlenis Sierra; Cuba
Men's madison	Chile; Antonio Cabrera; Felipe Peñaloza	United States; Gavin Hoover; Adrian Hegyvary	Colombia; Brayan Sánchez; Juan Esteban Arango
Women's madison	United States; Christina Birch; Kimberly Geist	Canada; Maggie Coles-Lyster; Miriam Brouwer	Mexico; Lizbeth Salazar; Jessica Bonilla

- ^{Men's sprint} Njisane Phillip of Trinidad and Tobago originally won the silver medal, but was disqualified for doping.
- ^{Men's team sprint} Trinidad and Tobago team originally won gold medals but was disqualified due to anti-doping rules violation by Njisane Phillip. Brazilian team originally won bronze medals but was disqualified due to anti-doping rules violation by Kacio Fonseca.

== Qualification ==
A total of 250 (143 men and 107 women) cyclists will qualify to compete. 160 will qualify in road/track, 34 in mountain biking and 56 in BMX. Various events and rankings were used to determine the qualifiers. A nation could enter a maximum of 26 athletes, four in mountain biking (two per gender), six in BMX (three per gender) and a combined 16 for road and track (ten men and six women). Peru as host nation, was automatically awarded the maximum quota of 26 spots.

== See also ==
- Cycling at the 2020 Summer Olympics
