= Mexico at the 2019 Pan American Games =

- IOC code: MEX
- NOC: Mexican Olympic Committee

in Lima, Peru July 26 – August 11, 2019
- Competitors: 543 in 42 sports
- Flag bearer: Jorge Orozco (opening)
- Medals Ranked 3rd: Gold 37 Silver 39 Bronze 62 Total 138

Pan American Games appearances (overview)
- 1951; 1955; 1959; 1963; 1967; 1971; 1975; 1979; 1983; 1987; 1991; 1995; 1999; 2003; 2007; 2011; 2015; 2019; 2023

Mexico competed in the 2019 Pan American Games in Lima, Peru from July 26 to August 11, 2019.

On July 4, 2019, sport shooter Jorge Orozco was named as the country's flag bearer during the opening ceremony.

== Medalists ==
The following Mexican athletes won medals at the games.

Medal	Name	Sport	Event	Date
Gold	Mariana Arceo	Modern pentathlon	Women's individual	July 27
Gold	Paula Fregoso	Taekwondo	Women's poomsae individual	July 27
Gold	Daniela Souza	Taekwondo	Women's -49 kg	July 27
Gold	Crisanto Grajales	Triathlon	Men's	July 27
Gold	Jonathan Muñoz	Weightlifting	Men's -67 kg	July 27
Gold	Daniela Campuzano	Cycling	Women's cross-country	July 28
Gold	José Gerardo Ulloa	Cycling	Men's cross-country	July 28
Gold	Ana Zulema Ibañez; Leonardo Juarez	Taekwondo	Mixed poomsae pairs	July 28
Gold	Beatriz Briones	Canoeing	Women's K-1 500 m	July 29
Gold	Duilio Carrillo; José Melchor Silva	Modern pentathlon	Men's relay	July 29
Gold	Briseida Acosta	Taekwondo	Women's +67 kg	July 29
Gold	Patricio Font	Water skiing	Men's tricks	July 29
Gold	Fabian De Luna	Gymnastics	Men's rings	July 30
Gold	Isaac Nuñez	Gymnastics	Men's parallel bars	July 31
Gold	Daniela Gaxiola; Jessica Salazar	Cycling	Women's team sprint	August 1
Gold	Juan Celaya	Diving	Men's 1 m springboard	August 1
Gold	Kevin Berlín; Iván García	Diving	Men's synchro 10 m	August 2
Gold	Yahel Castillo; Juan Celaya	Diving	Men's synchro 3 m	August 3
Gold	Ana Galindo; Adriana Hernández; Mildred Maldonado; Britany Sainz; Karen Villanueva	Gymnastics	Women's rhythmic group all-around	August 3
Gold	Ana Galindo; Adriana Hernández; Mildred Maldonado; Britany Sainz; Karen Villanueva	Gymnastics	Women's rhythmic group 5 balls	August 4
Gold	Kevin Berlín	Diving	Men's 10 m	August 5
Gold	Fernando Daniel Martínez	Athletics	Men's 5000 m	August 6
Gold	Rodrigo Montoya	Racquetball	Men's singles	August 7
Gold	Rodrigo Montoya; Javier Mar	Racquetball	Men's doubles	August 7
Gold	Paola Longoria	Racquetball	Women's singles	August 7
Gold	Paola Longoria; Samantha Salas	Racquetball	Women's doubles	August 7
Gold	José Carlos Villarreal	Athletics	Men's 800 m	August 8
Gold	Laura Esther Galván	Athletics	Women's 5000 m	August 9
Gold	Alan Armenta; Alexis López	Rowing	Men's lightweight double sculls	August 9
Gold	David Álvarez	Basque pelota	Mano singles 36m fronton	August 10
Gold	Josué Roberto López; Luis Ramón Molina	Basque pelota	Frontenis pairs 30m fronton	August 10
Gold	Dulce Miranda Figueroa; Laura Selem Puentes	Basque pelota	Paleta Rubber Pairs 30m Fronton	August 10
Gold	Guadalupe María Hernández; Ariana Yolanda Cepeda	Basque pelota	Frontenis pairs 30m fronton	August 10
Gold	Arturo Rodríguez	Basque pelota	Paleta Rubber Singles Trinkete	August 10
Gold	Paola Longoria; Montserrat Mejía; Samantha Salas; Alexandra Herrera	Racquetball	Women's team	August 10
Gold	Kenia Lechuga	Rowing	Women's lightweight single sculls	August 10
Gold	Alejandra Valencia	Archery	Women's recurve individual	August 11
Silver	José Luis Santana	Athletics	Men's marathon	July 27
Silver	Iliana Lomelí; Miram Zetter	Bowling	Women's doubles	July 27
Silver	Brandon Plaza	Taekwondo	Men's -58 kg	July 27
Silver	Karina Alanís; Beatriz Briones; Brenda Galilea Gutierrez; Maricela Montemayor	Canoeing	Women's K-4 500 m	July 28
Silver	Diana Elisa García; Alfredo Avila	Squash	Mixed doubles	July 28
Silver	Aremi Fuentes	Weightlifting	Women's -76 kg	July 29
Silver	Lombardo Ontiveros; Juan Virgen	Beach volleyball	Men's	July 30
Silver	Miram Zetter	Bowling	Women's singles	July 30
Silver	Nuria Diosdado; Joanna Jiménez	Artistic swimming	Women's duet	July 31
Silver	Regina Alférez; Teresa Ixchel Alonso; Nuria Diosdado; Joanna Jiménez; Luisa Samanta Rodríguez; Jessica Sobrino; Ana Karen Soto; Pamela Nuzhet Toscano; Amaya Velázquez	Artistic swimming	Women's team	July 31
Silver	Ignacio Prado	Cycling	Men's omnium	August 1
Silver	Edson Ramírez	Shooting	Men's 10 metre air rifle	August 2
Silver	Lizbeth Salazar	Cycling	Women's omnium	August 3
Silver	Juan Celaya	Diving	Men's 3 m springboard	August 4
Silver	Gabriela Agúndez; Alejandra Orozco	Diving	Women's synchro 10 m	August 4
Silver	Dolores Hernández	Diving	Women's 3 m	August 5
Silver	Iván García	Diving	Men's 10 m	August 5
Silver	Ana Galindo; Adriana Hernández; Mildred Maldonado; Britany Sainz; Karen Villanueva	Gymnastics	Rhythmic group 3 hoops + 2 clubs	August 5
Silver	Risper Biyaki	Athletics	Women's 10,000 m	August 6
Silver	Alvaro Beltrán	Racquetball	Men's singles	August 7
Silver	Eugenio Garza; Enrique González; Lorenza O'Farrill; Patricio Pasquel	Equestrian	Team jumping	August 7
Silver	Alfonso Leyva	Wrestling	Men's Greco-Roman 87 kg	August 7
Silver	Paola Morán	Athletics	Women's 400 m	August 8
Silver	Luz Olvera	Judo	Women's -52 kg	August 8
Silver	Pamela Contreras; Cinthia de la Rue; Victora Cruz	Karate	Women's team kata	August 9
Silver	Waldo Ramírez; Jesús Rodríguez; Diego Rosales	Karate	Men's team kata	August 9
Silver	Andrea Becerra	Archery	Women's compound individual	August 10
Silver	Isaac Pérez; Daniel García	Basque pelota	Paleta Rubber Pairs Trinkete	August 10
Silver	Xyomara Valdivia	Bodybuilding	Women's bikini fitness	August 10
Silver	Ignacio Prado	Cycling	Men's road race	August 10
Silver	Alicia Hernández	Karate	Women's –50 kg	August 10
Silver	Alan Cuevas	Karate	Men's –84 kg	August 10
Silver	Jorge Luis Martínez	Roller sports	Men's 500 m	August 10
Silver	Juan Carlos Cabrebra	Rowing	Men's single sculls	August 10
Silver	Angy Arthury Canul; Alexis López; Rafael Alejandro Mejía; Marco Antonio Velázquez	Rowing	Men's lightweight coxless four	August 10
Silver	Mariana Avitia; Aída Román; Alejandra Valencia	Archery	Women's recurve team	August 11
Silver	Horacio Nava	Athletics	Men's 50 kilometres walk	August 11
Bronze	Juan Joel Pacheco	Athletics	Men's marathon	July 27
Bronze	José Llergo; Arturo Quintero	Bowling	Men's doubles	July 27
Bronze	Rigoberto Camilo; Guillermo Quirino	Canoeing	Men's C-2 1000 m	July 27
Bronze	César Salazar	Squash	Men's singles	July 27
Bronze	Arturo Salazar; César Salazar	Squash	Men's doubles	July 27
Bronze	Marco Arroyo	Taekwondo	Men's poomsae individual	July 27
Bronze	Cecila Pérez	Triathlon	Women's	July 27
Bronze	Antonio Vázquez	Weightlifting	Men's -61 kg	July 27
Bronze	Mauricio Alejandro Figueroa; Osbaldo Fuentes; Javier López; Juan Pablo Rodríguez	Canoeing	Men's K-4 500 m	July 28
Bronze	Ana Gabriela López	Weightlifting	Women's -55 kg	July 28
Bronze	Mauricio Figueroa; Osbaldo Fuentes	Canoeing	Men's K-2 1000 m	July 29
Bronze	Alejandra Ramírez	Shooting	Women's trap	July 29
Bronze	Carlos Sansores	Taekwondo	Men's +80 kg	July 29
Bronze	Carlos Lamadrid	Water skiing	Men's slalom	July 29
Bronze	Cecila Pérez; Claudia Rivas; Crisanto Grajales; Irving Pérez	Triathlon	Mixed relay	July 29
Bronze	Iliana Lomeli	Bowling	Women's singles	July 30
Bronze	Rogelio Romero	Boxing	Men's Light heavyweight	July 30
Bronze	Brianda Cruz	Boxing	Women's Welterweight	July 30
Bronze	Esmeralda Falcón	Boxing	Women's Lightweight	July 30
Bronze	Beatriz Briones; Karina Alanis	Canoeing	Women's K-2 500 m	July 30
Bronze	Beatriz Briones	Canoeing	Women's K-1 200 m	July 30
Bronze	José Luis Sánchez	Shooting	Men's 50 m rifle three position	July 30
Bronze	Patricio González	Water skiing	Men's wakeboard	July 30
Bronze	Raúl Manriquez Manriquez	Weightlifting	Men's +109 kg	July 30
Bronze	Arturo Salazar; César Salazar; Alfredo Avila	Squash	Men's team	July 31
Bronze	Samantha Terán; Diana Elisa García; Dina Anguiano	Squash	Women's team	July 31
Bronze	Paola Espinosa; Dolores Hernandez	Diving	Women's synchronized 3 m	August 1
Bronze	Mexico men's national softball team	Softball	Men's tournament	August 1
Bronze	Yuli Verdugo	Cycling	Women's keirin	August 2
Bronze	Paola Espinosa	Diving	Women's 1 m	August 2
Bronze	Gabriela Martínez; Edson Ramírez	Shooting	Mixed pairs air rifle	August 3
Bronze	Alejandra Orozco	Diving	Women's 10 m	August 3
Bronze	Sofía Reinoso	Canoeing	Women's slalom K-1	August 4
Bronze	Sofía Reinoso	Canoeing	Women's extreme slalom K-1	August 4
Bronze	Daniela Gaxiola	Cycling	Women's sprint	August 4
Bronze	Jessica Bonilla; Lizbeth Salazar	Cycling	Women's Madison	August 4
Bronze	Karla Díaz	Gymnastics	Rhythmic individual ribbon	August 5
Bronze	Dafne Navarro	Gymnastics	Women's trampoline	August 5
Bronze	Gabriel Castaño; Daniel Ramírez; Jorge Iga; Long Gutiérrez	Swimming	Men's 4 × 100 m freestyle relay	August 6
Bronze	Uziel Muñoz	Athletics	Men's shot put	August 7
Bronze	Marie Conde*; Monika González; Jorge Iga; José Angel Martínez*; María José Mata; Daniel Ramírez; Tayde Revilak*	Swimming	Mixed 4 × 100 m freestyle relay	August 7
Bronze	Manuel López	Wrestling	Men's Greco-Roman 67 kg	August 7
Bronze	Alely Hernández; Nataly Michel; Melissa Rebolledo	Fencing	Women's team foil	August 8
Bronze	Edna Carrillo	Judo	Women's -48 kg	August 8
Bronze	Maite Arrilaga; Fernanda Ceballos	Rowing	Women's coxless pair	August 8
Bronze	Ricardo Vargas	Swimming	Men's 800 m freestyle	August 8
Bronze	Miguel De Lara	Swimming	Men's 200 m breaststroke	August 8
Bronze	Roberto Vilches	Athletics	Men's high jump	August 9
Bronze	Isaac Pérez	Basque pelota	Peruvian fronton	August 9
Bronze	Miguel María Urrutia; Rodrigo Ledesma	Basque pelota	Paleta Leather Pairs 36m Fronton	August 9
Bronze	Paulina Castillo; Rosa Flores	Basque pelota	Paleta Rubber Pairs Trinkete	August 9
Bronze	Álvaro Beltrán; Javier Mar; Rodrigo Montoya	Racquetball	Men's team	August 9
Bronze	Jorge Luis Martínez	Roller sports	Men's 300 m time trial	August 9
Bronze	Jorge Iga; Long Gutiérrez; José Angel Martínez; Ricardo Vargas	Swimming	Men's 4 × 200 m freestyle relay	August 9
Bronze	Ambar Garnica	Wrestling	Women's Freestyle 68 kg	August 9
Bronze	Lizbeth Salazar	Cycling	Women's road race	August 10
Bronze	Mexico national under-23 football team	Football	Men's tournament	August 10
Bronze	Paula Flores	Karate	Women's –55 kg	August 10
Bronze	Xhunashi Caballero	Karate	Women's –61 kg	August 10
Bronze	Verónica Elías	Roller sports	Women's 300 m time trial	August 10
Bronze	Ricardo Vargas	Swimming	Men's 1500 m freestyle	August 10
Bronze	Alejandra Valencia; Ángel David Alvarado	Archery	Mixed team recurve	August 11

* – Indicates athlete participated in the preliminaries but not in the final.

Medals by sport
Sport	1st place, gold medalist(s)	2nd place, silver medalist(s)	3rd place, bronze medalist(s)	Total
Basque pelota	5	1	3	9
Racquetball	5	1	1	7
Diving	4	4	3	11
Gymnastics	4	1	2	7
Taekwondo	4	1	2	7
Athletics	3	4	3	10
Cycling	3	3	4	10
Rowing	2	2	1	5
Modern pentathlon	2	0	0	2
Archery	1	2	1	4
Canoeing	1	1	7	9
Weightlifting	1	1	3	5
Triathlon	1	0	2	3
Water skiing	1	0	2	3
Karate	0	4	2	6
Bowling	0	2	2	4
Artistic swimming	0	2	0	2
Squash	0	1	4	5
Shooting	0	1	3	4
Roller sports	0	1	2	3
Wrestling	0	1	2	3
Judo	0	1	1	2
Beach volleyball	0	1	0	1
Bodybuilding	0	1	0	1
Equestrian	0	1	0	1
Swimming	0	0	6	6
Boxing	0	0	3	3
Fencing	0	0	1	1
Football	0	0	1	1
Softball	0	0	1	1
Total	37	37	62	136

Medals by day
Day	1st place, gold medalist(s)	2nd place, silver medalist(s)	3rd place, bronze medalist(s)	Total
July 27	5	3	8	16
July 28	3	2	2	7
July 29	4	1	5	10
July 30	1	2	9	12
July 31	1	2	2	5
August 1	2	1	2	5
August 2	1	1	2	4
August 3	2	1	2	5
August 4	1	2	4	7
August 5	1	3	2	6
August 6	1	1	1	3
August 7	4	3	3	10
August 8	1	2	5	8
August 9	2	2	8	12
August 10	7	9	6	22
August 11	1	2	1	4
Total	37	37	62	136

Medals by gender
Gender	1st place, gold medalist(s)	2nd place, silver medalist(s)	3rd place, bronze medalist(s)	Total
Male	19	17	30	66
Female	17	18	28	63
Mixed	1	2	4	7
Total	37	37	62	136

Multiple medalists
Name	Sport	1st place, gold medalist(s)	2nd place, silver medalist(s)	3rd place, bronze medalist(s)	Total
Paola Longoria	Racquetball	3	0	0	3
Juan Celaya	Diving	2	1	0	3
Ana Victoria Galindo	Gymnastics	2	1	0	3
Adriana Haydee Hernández	Gymnastics	2	1	0	3
Mildred Maldonado	Gymnastics	2	1	0	3
Britany Sainz	Gymnastics	2	1	0	3
Karen Villanueva	Gymnastics	2	1	0	3
Rodrigo Montoya	Racquetball	2	0	1	3
Kevín Berlin	Diving	2	0	0	2
Samantha Salas	Racquetball	2	0	0	2
Beatriz Briones	Canoeing	1	1	2	4
Alejandra Valencia	Archery	1	1	1	3
Iván García	Diving	1	1	0	2
López	Rowing	1	1	0	2
Daniela Gaxiola	Cycling	1	0	1	2
Crisanto Grajales	Triathlon	1	0	1	2
Javier Mar	Racquetball	1	0	1	2
Nuria Diosdado	Artistic swimming	0	2	0	2
Joanna Jiménez	Artistic swimming	0	2	0	2
Ignacio Prado	Cycling	0	2	0	2
Lizbeth Salazar	Cycling	0	1	2	3
Isaac Pérez	Basque pelota	0	1	1	2
Iliana Lomelí	Bowling	0	1	1	2
Karina Alanís	Canoeing	0	1	1	2
Alejandra Orozco	Diving	0	1	1	2
Dolores Hernández	Diving	0	1	1	2
Álvaro Beltrán	Racquetball	0	1	1	2
Jorge Luis Martínez	Roller sports	0	1	1	2
Edson Ramírez	Shooting	0	1	1	2
Alfredo Avila	Squash	0	1	1	2
Diana Elisa García	Squash	0	1	1	2
César Salazar	Squash	0	0	3	3
Jorge Iga	Swimming	0	0	3	3
Ricardo Vargas	Swimming	0	0	3	3
Mauricio Figueroa	Canoeing	0	0	2	2
Osbaldo Fuentes	Canoeing	0	0	2	2
Sofía Reinoso	Canoeing	0	0	2	2
Paola Espinosa	Diving	0	0	2	2
Long Gutiérrez	Swimming	0	0	2	2
José Angel Martínez	Swimming	0	0	2	2
Daniel Ramirez	Swimming	0	0	2	2
Cecilia Pérez	Triathlon	0	0	2	2

== Competitors ==
The following is the list of number of competitors (per gender) participating at the games per sport/discipline.

Sport	Men	Women	Total
Archery	4	4	8
Artistic swimming	—N/a	9	9
Athletics	20	11	31
Badminton	3	3	6
Basketball	12	0	12
Basque pelota	8	6	14
Bodybuilding	1	1	2
Bowling	2	2	4
Boxing	3	3	6
Canoeing	11	9	20
Cycling	14	9	23
Diving	4	4	8
Equestrian	9	3	12
Fencing	7	9	16
Field hockey	16	16	32
Football	18	18	36
Golf	2	2	4
Gymnastics	7	13	20
Handball	14	0	14
Judo	5	7	12
Karate	5	7	12
Modern pentathlon	3	3	6
Racquetball	3	4	7
Roller sports	3	2	5
Rowing	15	5	20
Rugby sevens	0	12	12
Sailing	6	2	8
Shooting	11	11	22
Softball	15	15	30
Squash	3	3	6
Surfing	2	3	5
Swimming	13	13	26
Taekwondo	6	7	13
Table tennis	3	3	6
Tennis	3	3	6
Triathlon	3	3	6
Volleyball	14	2	16
Water polo	11	11	22
Water skiing	4	2	6
Weightlifting	4	4	8
Wrestling	6	3	9
Total	296	247	543

== Archery ==
Men

Athlete	Event	Ranking Round		Round of 32	Round of 16	Quarterfinals	Semifinals	Final / BM	Rank
Athlete	Event	Score	Seed	Opposition Score	Opposition Score	Opposition Score	Opposition Score	Opposition Score	Rank
Ángel David Alvarado	Recurve individual	672	6	Guillen (ESA); W 6-2	Sousa (BRA); L 4-6	Did not advance			
Luis Álvarez	Recurve individual	672	7	Maxwell (CAN); W 6-0	Puentes (CUB); L 4-6	Did not advance			
Eernesto Boardman	Recurve individual	639	25	Stanwood (USA); W 6-4	Peters (CAN); L 3-7	Did not advance			
Ángel David Alvarado; Luis Álvarez; Ernesto Boardman	Recurve team	1983	3	—N/a		Colombia; W 5-4	Chile; L 0-6	Bronze medal final United States; L 3-5	4
Rodolfo González	Compound individual	710	2	—N/a	Bye	Pizarro (PUR); W 144-143	Hernández (ESA); L 145-146	Bronze medal final Muñoz (COL); L 144-149	4

Women

Athlete	Event	Ranking Round		Round of 32	Round of 16	Quarterfinals	Semifinals	Final / BM	Rank
Athlete	Event	Score	Seed	Opposition Score	Opposition Score	Opposition Score	Opposition Score	Opposition Score	Rank
Mariana Avitia	Recurve individual	643	5	Burga (PER); W 7-1	Gomes (BRA); W 6-2	Rendón (COL); L 3-7	Did not advance		
Aída Román	Recurve individual	653	3	Andrades (CHI); W 6-0	Sarduy (CUB); W 6-0	Lorig (USA); L 4-6	Did not advance		
Alejandra Valencia	Recurve individual	675	1 PR	Espinoza (BOL); W 6-0	Chénier (CAN); W 7-1	Mickelberry (USA); W 6-5	Rendón (COL); W 6-0	Khatuna Lorig (USA); W 7-3	1st place, gold medalist(s)
Mariana Avitia; Aída Román; Alejandra Valencia	Recurve team	1971	1 PR	—N/a		Bolivia; W 6-0	Brazil; L 6-0	United States; L 3-5	2nd place, silver medalist(s)
Andrea Becerra	Compound individual	697	3	—N/a	Bye	Cintron (PUR); W 146-141	Maria Gonzalez (ARG); W 143-141	López (COL); L 142-146	2nd place, silver medalist(s)

Mixed

Athlete	Event	Ranking Round		Round of 32	Round of 16	Quarterfinals	Semifinals	Final / BM	Rank
Athlete	Event	Score	Seed	Opposition Score	Opposition Score	Opposition Score	Opposition Score	Opposition Score	Rank
Alejandra Valencia; Ángel David Alvarado	Mixed team recurve	1347	2	—N/a	Bye	Argentina; W 6-0	Colombia; L 4-5	Bronze medal final Canada; W 5-3	3rd place, bronze medalist(s)
Andrea Maya Becerra; Rodolfo González	Mixed team compound	1407	3	—N/a		Brazil; L 151-153	Did not advance		

== Artistic swimming ==
Athlete	Event	Technical Routine		Free Routine (Final)			
Athlete	Event	Points	Rank	Points	Rank	Total Points	Rank
Nuria Diosdado; Joanna Jiménez	Women's duet	86.3328	2	88.0333	2	174.3661	2nd place, silver medalist(s)
Regina Alférez; Teresa Ixchel Alonso; Nuria Diosdado; Joanna Jiménez; Luisa Samanta Rodríguez; Jessica Sobrino; Ana Karen Soto; Pamela Nuzhet Toscano; Amaya Velázquez	Women's team	86.2910	2	88.8333	2	175.1243	2nd place, silver medalist(s)

== Athletics ==
Men
Track & road events

Athlete	Event	Heats		Semifinals		Final	
Athlete	Event	Time	Rank	Time	Rank	Time	Rank
Jesús Tonatiu López	800 m	—N/a		Did not finish			
Jorge Arturo Montes	800 m	—N/a		1:50.47	11	Did not finish	
José Carlos Villarreal	1500 m	—N/a				3:39.93	1st place, gold medalist(s)
Fernando Daniel Martínez	1500 m	—N/a				3:45.13	7
Fernando Daniel Martínez	5000 m	—N/a				13:53.87	1st place, gold medalist(s)
José Juan Esparza	5000 m	—N/a				13:56.65	5
Saby Luna	10000 m	—N/a				29:07.18	9
Juan Luis Barrios	10000 m	—N/a				Did not start	
Juan Joel Pacheco	Marathon	—N/a				2:05:30	3rd place, bronze medalist(s)
José Luis Santana	Marathon	—N/a				2:04:07	2nd place, silver medalist(s)
Carlos Sánchez	20 km walk	—N/a				DSQ	
Andrés Eduardo Oliva	20 km walk	—N/a				1:22:36	6
Isaac Palma	50 km walk	—N/a				DSQ	
Horacio Nava	50 km walk	—N/a				3:51:45	2nd place, silver medalist(s)

Key: Q = Qualified for next round based on position in heat; q = Qualified for next round as fastest loser; * = Athlete ran in a preliminary round but not the final

Field events

Athlete	Event	Qualification		Final	
Athlete	Event	Distance	Rank	Distance	Rank
Roberto Vilches	High jump	—N/a		2.26	3rd place, bronze medalist(s)
Edgar Rivera	High jump	—N/a		2.15	9
Jorge Luna	Pole vault	—N/a		5.31	8
Antonio Roberto Ruiz	Pole vault	—N/a		No mark	
Uziel Muñoz	Shot put	—N/a		20.56	3rd place, bronze medalist(s)
Diego del Real	Hammer throw	—N/a		74.16	4
José Manuel Padilla	Hammer throw	—N/a		66.40	11

Key: Q = Qualify for final based on position in group; q = Qualify for final based on position in field without meeting qualifying mark

Women
Track & road events

Athlete	Event	Heats		Semifinals		Final	
Athlete	Event	Time	Rank	Time	Rank	Time	Rank
Paola Morán	400 m	—N/a		51.58	1 Q	51.02	2nd place, silver medalist(s)
Luisa Real	800 m	—N/a		2:05.73	5 q	2:04.56	7
Alma Delia Cortés	1500 m	—N/a				4:22.29	9
Laura Esther Galván	1500 m	—N/a				4:10.53	4
Laura Esther Galván	5000 m	—N/a				15:35.47	1st place, gold medalist(s)
Risper Biyaki Gesabwa	5000 m	—N/a				15:42.47	4
Risper Biyaki Gesabwa	10000 m	—N/a				31:59.00	2nd place, silver medalist(s)
Úrsula Patricia Sánchez	10000 m	—N/a				33:22.30	8
Natali Naomí Mendoza	3000 m steeplechase	—N/a				Did not finish	
Margarita Hernández	Marathon	—N/a				2:35:06	7
Rebeca Pamela Enríquez	20 km walk	—N/a				1:41:28	13
Ilse Adriana Guerrero	20 km walk	—N/a				1:30:54	4

Key: Q = Qualified for next round based on position in heat; q = Qualified for next round as fastest loser; * = Athlete ran in a preliminary round but not the final

Field events

Athlete	Event	Qualification		Final	
Athlete	Event	Distance	Rank	Distance	Rank
Karla Yazmín Terán	High jump	—N/a		1.79	7

Key: Q = Qualify for final based on position in group; q = Qualify for final based on position in field without meeting qualifying mark

== Badminton ==
Mexico qualified a team of six badminton athletes (three per gender).

Men

Athlete	Event	Round 1	Round 2	Round 3	Quarterfinal	Semifinal	Final / BM	
Athlete	Event	Opposition Result	Opposition Result	Opposition Result	Opposition Result	Opposition Result	Opposition Result	Rank
Andrés López	Men's singles	Bye	Guevara (PER); W 2-0	Yang (CAN); L 0-2	Did not advance			
Luis Montoya	Men's singles	Bye	Montoya (BRA); W 2-0	Araya (CHI); W 2-0	Cordón (GUA); L 0-2	Did not advance		
Lino Muñoz	Men's singles	Bye	La Torre (PER); W 2-0	Leon (CHI); W 2-0	Ho-Shue (CAN); L 0-2	Did not advance		
Andrés López; Luis Montoya	Men's doubles	Howell / Thorpe (BAR); W 2-0	—N/a		Chew / Chew (USA); L 0-2	Did not advance		

Women

Athlete	Event	Round 1	Round 2	Round 3	Quarterfinal	Semifinal	Final / BM	
Athlete	Event	Opposition Result	Opposition Result	Opposition Result	Opposition Result	Opposition Result	Opposition Result	Rank
Haramara Gaitan	Women's singles	Bye	Corleto (GUA); W 2-0	Lima (BRA); W 2-0	Li (CAN); L 0-2	Did not advance		
Sabrina Solis	Women's singles	Bye	Silva (BRA); L 0-2	Did not advance				
Adriana Valero	Women's singles	Bye	Blake (TRI); W 2-0	Macías (PER); L 0-2	Did not advance			
Haramara Gaitan; Adriana Valero	Women's doubles	Chen / Hsu (USA); L 0-2	—N/a		Did not advance			

Mixed

Athlete	Event	Round 1	Round 2	Quarterfinal	Semifinal	Final / BM	
Athlete	Event	Opposition Result	Opposition Result	Opposition Result	Opposition Result	Opposition Result	Rank
Lino Muñoz; Haramara Gaitan	Mixed doubles	Henry / Wynter (JAM); W 2-0	Chew / Chen (USA); W 2-1	Hurlburt-Yu / Wu (CAN); L 0-2	Did not advance		
Andrés López; Sabrina Solis	Mixed doubles	Brito / Polanco (DOM); W 2-0	Nishimura / Mini (PER); L 0-2	Did not advance			

== Basketball ==
Mexico qualified a men's team for the five-a-side tournament.

=== Men's tournament ===
Squad

Mexico men's national basketball team – 2019 Pan American Games roster
Players
Coaches

Pos.	No.	Name	Age – Date of birth	Height	Club	Ctr.
PG		Victor Alvarez	–	1.80 m (5 ft 11 in)	Soles de Mexicali	(Mexico)
C		Israel Gutiérrez	26 – 15 January 1993	2.06 m (6 ft 9 in)	Aguacateros de Michoacán	(Mexico)
SF		Jorge Camacho	–	2.02 m (6 ft 8 in)	Leñadores de Durango	(Mexico)
SG		Jose David Estrada	–	1.92 m (6 ft 4 in)	Correcaminos UAT Victoria	(Mexico)
PF		Jonathan Machado	–		Capitanes de la Ciudad de México	(Mexico)
		Eduardo Girón	–	1.96 m (6 ft 5 in)	Western New Mexico University	(United States)
G		Diego Willis	20 – 11 May 1999	1.94 m (6 ft 4 in)	New Jersey Institute of Technology	(United States)
SF		Jose Carlos Zesati	–	2.06 m (6 ft 9 in)	Ángeles de Puebla	(Mexico)
G/F		Jaime Jaquez Jr	–	1.98 m (6 ft 6 in)	University of California	(United States)
G		Alejandro Tostado	–	1.88 m (6 ft 2 in)	University of Tennessee at Chattanooga	(United States)
		Bryan Urrutia	–	1.85 m (6 ft 1 in)	University of Maryland Eastern Shore	(United States)
		Uriel Velis	–		Blinn College	(United States)

Head coach

- (Spain) Iván Déniz

Legend

- Club – describes current
  or most recent club
- Age – describes age
  on July 19, 2019

Results

Team	Pld	W	L	PF	PA	PD	Pts	Qualification
Argentina	3	2	1	268	234	+34	5	Qualified for the Semifinals
Dominican Republic	3	2	1	245	220	+25	5	Qualified for the Semifinals
Uruguay	3	1	2	194	246	−52	4	
Mexico	3	1	2	194	201	−7	4	

31 July 2019
21:00

Report

Mexico	61–65 (OT)	Dominican Republic
Scoring by quarter: 6–20, 13–13, 22–14, 14–8, Overtime: 6–10
Pts: Estrada 18; Rebs: Gutiérrez 9 Asts: Estrada 5		Pts: Rojas, Suero 13; Rebs: Santos, Vargas 6 Asts: Four players 1

Coliseo Eduardo Dibos, Lima
Referees: Jorge Vázquez (PUR)

1 August 2019
18:00

Report

Mexico	61–72	Uruguay
Scoring by quarter: 12–19, 12–11, 22–14, 15–28
Pts: Zesati 19; Rebs: Zesati 6 Asts: Estrada 2		Pts: Rojas 19; Rebs: Rojas 5 Asts: Parodi 4

Coliseo Eduardo Dibos, Lima
Referees: Michael Weiland (CAN)

2 August 2019
13:30

Report

Mexico	72–64	Argentina
Scoring by quarter: 10–20, 17–15, 24–20, 21–9
Pts: Estrada 18; Rebs: Gutiérrez 8 Asts: Estrada, Machado, Velis 2		Pts: Deck 13; Rebs: Fjellerup 7 Asts: Brussino 3

Coliseo Eduardo Dibos, Lima
Referees: Luis Vazquez (PUR)

Seventh place match

3 August 2019
10:30

Report

Virgin Islands	81–92	Mexico
Scoring by quarter: 13–26, 11–28, 31–12, 26–26
Pts: Hodge 25; Rebs: Perry-Murray 5 Asts: Aska 3		Pts: Camacho 18; Rebs: Gutiérrez 9 Asts: Five players 5

Coliseo Eduardo Dibos, Lima
Referees: Luis Vazquez (PUR)

Final rank: 7th

== Basque pelota ==
Men

Athlete	Event	Preliminary round					Semifinal	Final / BM	Rank
Athlete	Event	Match 1	Match 2	Match 3	Match 4	Rank	Semifinal	Final / BM	Rank
Athlete	Event	Opposition Score	Opposition Score	Opposition Score	Opposition Score	Rank	Opposition Score	Opposition Score	Rank
Arturo Rodríguez	Individual fronton rubber ball	Vera (VEN); W 2-0	Ramirez (URU); W 2-0	Blas (GUA); W 2-0	Tejeda (USA); W 2-0	1 Q	González (CUB); W 2-0	Facundo Andreasen (ARG); W 2-1	1st place, gold medalist(s)
Isaac Pérez	Peruvian fronton	Osorio (ARG); L 0-2	Martínez (PER); L 0-2	Espinoza (USA); W 2-1	González (CUB); L 0-2	4 Q	—N/a	Bronze medal final Espinoza (USA); W 2-1	3rd place, bronze medalist(s)
Daniel García; Isaac Pérez	Doubles trinquete rubber ball	Andreasen / Andreasen (ARG); L 0-2	Bellido / Velásquez (PER); W 2-0	Guichon / Rivas (URU); W 2-0	Domínguez / Romero (CHI); W 2-0	2 Q	—N/a	Andreasen / Andreasen (ARG); L 0-2	2nd place, silver medalist(s)
Miguel María Urrutia; Rodrigo Ledesma	Doubles fronton leather ball	Brugues / Huarte (USA); W 2-0	Chappi / Fernández (CUB); L 0-2	Fusto / Villegas (ARG); L 0-2	Fernández / Velásquez (PER); W 2-0	3 Q	—N/a	Bronze medal final Brugues / Huarte (USA); W 2-0	3rd place, bronze medalist(s)
David Álvarez	Individual hand fronton	Otheguy (BRA); W 2-0	Airala (URU); W 2-0	—N/a		1 Q	Bazo (BOL); W 2-0	Leiva (CUB); W 2-0	1st place, gold medalist(s)
Josué Roberto López; Luis Ramón Molina	Doubles frontenis	Espinoza / Espinoza (USA); W 2-0	Alberdi / Osorio (ARG); W 2-0	Bezada / Yupanqui (PER); W 2-0	García T / González (CHI); W 2-0	1 Q	—N/a	Espinoza / Espinoza (USA); W 2-0	1st place, gold medalist(s)

Women

Athlete	Event	Preliminary round					Semifinal	Final / BM	Rank
Athlete	Event	Match 1	Match 2	Match 3	Match 4	Rank	Semifinal	Final / BM	Rank
Athlete	Event	Opposition Score	Opposition Score	Opposition Score	Opposition Score	Rank	Opposition Score	Opposition Score	Rank
Paulina Castillo; Rosa Flores	Doubles trinquete rubber ball	Miranda / Naviliat (URU); L 0-2	Paredes / Rodríguez (PER); W 2-0	—N/a		2 Q	Pinto / García (ARG); L 0-2	Bronze medal final Valderrama / Solas (CHI); W 2-0	3rd place, bronze medalist(s)
Dulce Miranda Figueroa; Laura Selem Puentes	Doubles fronton rubber ball	Andrade / Spahn (ARG); W 2-0	Bernal / Rodríguez (PER); W 2-0	Bastarrica / Domínguez (CHI); W 2-0	Darriba / Medina (CUB); W 2-0	1 Q	—N/a	Darriba / Medina (CUB); W 2-0	1st place, gold medalist(s)
Guadalupe María Hernández; Ariana Yolanda Cepeda	Doubles frontenis	Busson / Podversich (ARG); W 2-0	Borges / Rangel (VEN); W 2-0	—N/a		1 Q	Paredes / Rodríguez (PER); W 2-0	Medina / Castillo (CUB); W 2-0	1st place, gold medalist(s)

== Bodybuilding ==
Mexico qualified a full team of two bodybuilders (one male and one female).

Athlete	Event	Final	
Athlete	Event	Points	Rank
Carlos Suárez	Men's class bodybuilding	Did not advance	
Xyomara Valdivia	Women's bikini fitness	26	2nd place, silver medalist(s)

== Bowling ==
Athlete	Event	Qualification / Final														Round robin											Semifinal	Final	
Athlete	Event	Block 1						Block 2						Total	Rank	Round robin											Semifinal	Final	
Athlete	Event	1	2	3	4	5	6	7	8	9	10	11	12	Total	Rank	1	2	3	4	5	6	7	8	Total	Grand total	Rank	Opposition Result	Opposition Result	Rank
José Llergo	Men's singles	232	210	244	168	279	235	257	151	225	188	195	225	2609	15	Did not advance													
Arturo Quintero	Men's singles	216	200	221	235	159	269	201	156	186	222	247	214	2526	19	Did not advance													
José Llergo; Arturo Quintero	Men's doubles	449	430	471	496	416	419	500	433	414	383	504	464	5379	3rd place, bronze medalist(s)	—N/a													
Iliana Lomelí	Women's singles	195	223	215	233	208	280	245	231	194	239	208	232	2703	3 Q	181	235	257	183	237	195	237	191	1796	4499	2 Q	Guerrero (COL); L 202-213	Did not advance	3rd place, bronze medalist(s)
Miram Zetter	Women's singles	258	224	237	227	221	230	230	231	208	210	262	212	2750	1 Q	214	204	185	241	221	254	191	210	1800	4550	1 Q	Rodríguez (COL); W 185-146	Guerrero (COL); L 171-198	2nd place, silver medalist(s)
Iliana Lomelí; Miram Zetter	Women's doubles	360	416	411	462	397	496	385	428	426	443	443	386	5053	2nd place, silver medalist(s)	—N/a													

== Boxing ==
Mexico qualified six boxers (three men and three women).

Men

Athlete	Event	Round of 16	Quarterfinals	Semifinals	Final	
Athlete	Event	Opposition Result	Opposition Result	Opposition Result	Opposition Result	Rank
Miguel Ángel Capilla	Flyweight	—N/a	Quiroga (ARG); LP	Did not advance		
Rogelio Romero	Light heavyweight	—N/a		Machado (BRA); LP	Did not advance	3rd place, bronze medalist(s)
Francisco Cantabrana	Heavyweight	—N/a	Lucar (PER); LP	Did not advance		

Women

Athlete	Event	Quarterfinals	Semifinals	Final	
Athlete	Event	Opposition Result	Opposition Result	Opposition Result	Rank
Esmeralda Falcón	Lightweight	Ojeda (NCA); WP	Sánchez (ARG); LP	Did not advance	3rd place, bronze medalist(s)
Brianda Cruz	Welterweight	Osejo (NCA); WP	Da Silva (CAN); LP	Did not advance	3rd place, bronze medalist(s)
Ana Elizabeth Salas	Middleweight	Graham (USA); LP	Did not advance		

== Canoeing ==
=== Slalom ===
Mexico qualified a total of five slalom athletes (three men and two women).

Athlete(s)	Event	Preliminary			Semifinal		Final	
Athlete(s)	Event	Run 1	Run 2	Rank	Time	Rank	Time	Rank
Ricardo Fentanes	Men's C-1	120.39	155.14	6 Q	127.33	6	Did not advance	
Antonio Reinoso	Men's K-1	96.53	97.44	9	Did not advance			
Antonio Reinoso	Men's extreme slalom K-1	0.00	—N/a	3	Did not advance			
Sasha Azcona	Women's C-1	Did not start						
Sofía Reinoso	Women's K-1	104.03	106.33	6 Q	115.15	5 Q	112.20	3rd place, bronze medalist(s)
Sofía Reinoso	Women's extreme K-1	0.00	—N/a	2 Q	—N/a	2 Q	—N/a	3rd place, bronze medalist(s)

=== Sprint ===
Men

Athlete	Event	Heats		Semifinals		Final	
Athlete	Event	Time	Rank	Time	Rank	Time	Rank
Alberto Briones	K-1 200 m	37.329	4 QS	38.281	5	Did not advance	
Juan Pablo Rodríguez	K-1 1000 m	4:05.087	6 QS	3:44.999	1 QF	3:45.877	7
Osbaldo Fuentes; Mauricio Figueroa	K-2 1000 m	3:22.261	2 QF	Bye		3:18.439	3rd place, bronze medalist(s)
Osbaldo Fuentes; Mauricio Figueroa; Javier López; Juan Pablo Rodríguez	K-4 500 m	—N/a				1:23.106	3rd place, bronze medalist(s)
Everardo Cristóbal	C-1 1000 m	4:01.627	2 QF	Bye		4:03.689	4
Guillermo Quirino; Rigoberto Camilo	C-2 1000 m	—N/a				3:37.726	3rd place, bronze medalist(s)

Qualification Legend: QF = Qualify to final; QS = Qualify to semifinal

Women

Athlete	Event	Heats		Semifinals		Final	
Athlete	Event	Time	Rank	Time	Rank	Time	Rank
Beatriz Briones	K-1 200 m	41.993	1 QF	Bye		43.436	3rd place, bronze medalist(s)
Beatriz Briones	K-1 500 m	1:56.328	2 QF	Bye		1:52.552	1st place, gold medalist(s)
Beatriz Briones; Karina Alanís	K-2 500 m	1:49.309	2 QF	Bye		1:47.472	3rd place, bronze medalist(s)
Beatriz Briones; Karina Alanís; Brenda Galilea Gutierrez; Maricela Montemayor	K-4 500 m	—N/a				1:34.646	2nd place, silver medalist(s)
Stephanie Rodríguez	C-1 200 m	50.824	4 QS	50.135	3 QF	51.601	7
Stephanie Rodríguez; Ada González	C-2 500 m	—N/a				2:10.071	5

Qualification Legend: QF = Qualify to final; QS = Qualify to semifinal

== Cycling ==
=== BMX ===
Freestyle

Athlete	Event	Qualification		Final	
Athlete	Event	Points	Rank	Points	Rank
Margarita Valenzuela	Women's	53.25	5	66.33	5

Racing

Athlete	Event	Ranking round		Quarterfinal		Semifinal		Final	
Athlete	Event	Time	Rank	Points	Rank	Time	Rank	Time	Rank
Kevin Mireles	Men's	59.743	23	22	6	Did not finish			
Oscar Otero	Men's	36.550	17	15	5	Did not finish			

=== Mountain biking ===
Athlete	Event	Time	Rank
José Gerardo Ulloa	Men's	1:25:03	1st place, gold medalist(s)
Jaime Miranda	Men's	Did not finish	
Daniela Campuzano	Women's	1:30:45	1st place, gold medalist(s)
Ariadna Gutiérrez	Women's	1:40:24	12

=== Road cycling ===
Athlete	Event	Time	Rank
José Aguirre	Men's road race	4:09:02	15
Ignacio Prado	Men's road race	4:06:28	2nd place, silver medalist(s)
Iván Carbajal	Men's road race	4:09:18	25
René Corella	Men's road race	4:09:26	32
Ignacio Prado	Men's time trial	47:39.01	8
Rene Corella	Men's time trial	47:37.88	7
Lizbeth Salazar	Women's road race	2:19:50	3rd place, bronze medalist(s)
Jessica Bonilla	Women's road race	2:20:24	22
Ariadna Gutiérrez	Women's road race	2:19:54	18
Jessica Bonilla	Women's time trial	26:51.94	10

=== Track cycling ===
Sprint

Athlete	Event	Qualification		Round of 16	Repechage 1	Quarterfinals	Semifinals	Final	
Athlete	Event	Time	Rank	Opposition Time	Opposition Time	Opposition Result	Opposition Result	Opposition Result	Rank
Manuel Resendez	Men's	10.549	14	Did not advance					
Juan Carlos Ruiz	Men's	10.727	15	Did not advance					
Edgar Verdugo; Manuel Resendez; Juan Carlos Ruiz	Men's team	45.843	4 Q	—N/a				Bronze medal final DSQ	
Daniela Gaxiola	Women's	11.291	3 Q	Vera (ARG); W 11.661	Bye	Walsh (CAN); W 11.654, W 11.778	Bayona (COL); W 11.426,L,L	Bronze medal final Salazar (MEX); W 11.413, W 11.646	3rd place, bronze medalist(s)
Jessica Salazar	Women's	11.435	5 Q	Gaviria (COL); W 11.790	Bye	Guerra (CUB); W 11.528, L, W 11.709	Mitchell (CAN); L,L	Bronze medal final Gaxiola (MEX); L,L	4
Daniela Gaxiola; Jessica Salazar	Women's team	33.759	1 Q	—N/a				33.424 PR	1st place, gold medalist(s)

Keirin

Athlete	Event	Heats	Repechage	Final
Athlete	Event	Rank	Rank	Rank
Edgar Verdugo	Men's	4 R	4	Did not advance
Yuli Verdugo	Women's	2 Q	—N/a	3rd place, bronze medalist(s)

Madison

Athlete	Event	Points	Rank
Ignacio Prado; José Alfredo Aguirre	Men's	56	4
Lizbeth Salazar; Jessica Bonilla	Women's	35	3rd place, bronze medalist(s)

Pursuit

Athlete	Event	Qualification		Semifinals	Finals	
Athlete	Event	Time	Rank	Opposition Result	Opposition Result	Rank
Ignacio Sarabia; Ignacio Prado; José Alfredo Aguirre; Edibaldo Maldonado	Men's team	4:11.384	4 QB	—N/a	Bronze medal final Chile; 4:11.634	4
Lizbeth Salazar; Jessica Bonilla; Sofía Arreola; Yuli Verdugo	Women's team	4:37.879	3 Q	Canada; L 4:36.673 QB	Bronze medal final Colombia; L Overlapped	4

Omnium

Athlete	Event	Scratch race		Tempo race		Elimination race		Points race		Total	
Athlete	Event	Rank	Points	Points	Rank	Rank	Points	Points	Rank	Points	Rank
Ignacio Prado	Men's	1	40	32	5	3	36	60	2	168	2nd place, silver medalist(s)
Lizbeth Salazar	Women's	6	30	38	2	2	38	56	2	162	2nd place, silver medalist(s)

== Diving ==
Men

Athlete	Event	Preliminary		Final	
Athlete	Event	Points	Rank	Points	Rank
Yahel Castillo	Men's 1m Springboard	358.80	3 Q	410.20	4
Juan Celaya	Men's 1m Springboard	368.00	2 Q	435.60	1st place, gold medalist(s)
Yahel Castillo	Men's 3m Springboard	368.40	13	Did not advance	
Juan Celaya	Men's 3m Springboard	381.05	11 Q	454.30	2nd place, silver medalist(s)
Kevin Berlín	Men's 10m Platform	412.50	8 Q	500.35	1st place, gold medalist(s)
Iván García	Men's 10m Platform	453.90	2 Q	497.55	2nd place, silver medalist(s)
Yahel Castillo; Juan Celaya	Men's 3m Synchro	—N/a		429.81	1st place, gold medalist(s)
Kevin Berlín; Iván García	Men's 10m Synchro Platform	—N/a		431.10	1st place, gold medalist(s)

Women

Athlete	Event	Preliminary		Final	
Athlete	Event	Points	Rank	Points	Rank
Paola Espinosa	Women's 1m Springboard	254.65	2 Q	278.35	3rd place, bronze medalist(s)
Dolores Hernández	Women's 1m Springboard	255.10	1 Q	273.15	4
Paola Espinosa	Women's 3m Springboard	286.20	6 Q	264.30	9
Dolores Hernández	Women's 3m Springboard	280.35	7 Q	339.60	2nd place, silver medalist(s)
Gabriela Agúndez	Women's 10m Platform	330.45	3 Q	327.00	6
Alejandra Orozco	Women's 10m Platform	351.20	1 Q	356.10	3rd place, bronze medalist(s)
Paola Espinosa; Dolores Hernandez	Women's 3m Synchro	—N/a		285.00	3rd place, bronze medalist(s)
Gabriela Agúndez; Alejandra Orozco	Women's 10m Synchro Platform	—N/a		307.38	2nd place, silver medalist(s)

== Equestrian ==
Mexico qualified a full team of 12 equestrians (four per discipline).

=== Dressage ===
Athlete	Horse	Event	Qualification						Grand Prix Freestyle / Intermediate I Freestyle	
Athlete	Horse	Event	Grand Prix / Prix St. Georges		Grand Prix Special / Intermediate I		Total		Grand Prix Freestyle / Intermediate I Freestyle	
Athlete	Horse	Event	Score	Rank	Score	Rank	Score	Rank	Score	Rank
Martha Del Valle	Beduino Lam	Individual	67.217	15	67.447	13	134.664	14 Q	68.780	15
Irvin Leiva	Pabellon	Individual	63.970	29	62.912	28	126.883	30	Did not advance	
Jesús Enrique Palacios	Tinto	Individual	65.529	22	64.647	24	130.176	25	Did not advance	
Bernadette Pujals	Curioso XXV	Individual	66.500	19	66.298	16	132.798	17	Did not advance	
Martha Del Valle; Irvin Leiva; Jesús Enrique Palacios; Bernadette Pujals	As above	Team	202.246	4	201.392	4	403.638	4	—N/a	

=== Eventing ===
Athlete	Horse	Event	Dressage		Cross-country		Jumping		Total	
Athlete	Horse	Event	Points	Rank	Points	Rank	Points	Rank	Points	Rank
Guillermo Germán de Campo	Quelite	Individual	31.20	11	16.80	10	4.00	11	52.00	8
Pedro Gutiérrez	California Mail	Individual	46.50	42	Eliminated		Did not advance			
Enrique Mercado	Tehuacan	Individual	35.80	18	16.40	9	4.00	11	56.20	10
José Alan Triana	Violento	Individual	38.80	20	85.60	25	16.00	23	140.40	23
Guillermo Germán de Campo; Pedro Gutiérrez; Enrique Mercado; José Alan triana	As above	Team	105.80	4	118.80	4	24.00	7	248.60	4

=== Jumping ===
Athlete	Horse	Event	Qualification								Final					
Athlete	Horse	Event	Round 1		Round 2		Round 3		Total		Round A		Round B		Total	
Athlete	Horse	Event	Faults	Rank	Faults	Rank	Faults	Rank	Faults	Rank	Faults	Rank	Faults	Rank	Faults	Rank
Eugenio Garza	Armani SL Z	Individual	5.50	20	4	9	0	1	9.50	10 Q	0	1 Q	4	9	4	6
Enrique González	Chacna	Individual	2.08	12	0	1	12	28	14.08	13 Q	8	16 Q	Withdrawn			
Lorenza O'Farrill	Queens Darling	Individual	4.60	17	0	1	16	35	20.60	17	Did not advance					
Patricio Pasquel	Babel	Individual	0.29	2	8	15	0	1	8.29	7 Q	4	5 Q	4	10	8	8
Eugenio Garza; Enrique González; Lorenza O'Farrill; Patricio Pasquel	As above	Team	6.97	4	4	1	12	3	22.97	2nd place, silver medalist(s)	—N/a					

== Fencing ==
Mexico qualified a team of 16 fencers (seven men and nine women).

Men

Athlete	Event	Ranking round			Round of 16	Quarterfinal	Semifinal	Final / BM	
Athlete	Event	Victories	Defeats	Rank	Opposition Result	Opposition Result	Opposition Result	Opposition Result	Rank
Darío Alberto Ibarra	Individual épée	1	4	6	Did not advance				
Jhonnatan Ortega	Individual épée	2	3	4 Q	Mc Dowald (USA); L 13-15	Did not advance			
Darío Alberto Ibarra; Jhonnatan Ortega; Carlos Esteban Sañudo	Team épée	—N/a				United States; L 25-45	Did not advance		
Raúl Arizaga	Individual foil	0	5	6	Did not advance				
Diego Cervantes	Individual foil	2	3	4 Q	Schenkel (CAN); L 6-15	Did not advance			
Raúl Arizaga; Jesús Ernesto Beltrán; Diego Alecke Cervantes	Team foil	—N/a				Brazil; L 31-45	Did not advance		
Julián Ayala	Individual sabre	4	1	1 Q	Bye	Gordon (CAN); L 5-15	Did not advance		

Women

Athlete	Event	Ranking round			Round of 16	Quarterfinal	Semifinal	Final / BM	
Athlete	Event	Victories	Defeats	Rank	Opposition Result	Opposition Result	Opposition Result	Opposition Result	Rank
Elizabeth Medina	Individual épée	3	2	3 Q	Tejeda (MEX); L 10-15	Did not advance			
Sheila Tejeda	Individual épée	3	2	3 Q	Medina (MEX); W 15-10	Di Tella (ARG); L 10-15	Did not advance		
Elizabeth Medina; Sheila Tejeda; Frania Tejeda	Team épée	—N/a				Brazil; L 31-45	Did not advance		
Alely Hernández	Individual foil	1	4	5 Q	Guo (CAN); L 5-15	Did not advance			
Nataly Michel	Individual foil	4	1	2 Q	Ondarts (ARG); W 15-12	Di Rienzo (BRA); L 13-15	Did not advance		
Alely Hernández; Nataly Michel; Melissa Rebolledo	Team foil	—N/a				Brazil; W 45-34	Canada; L 27-44	Bronze medal final Colombia; W 45-25	3rd place, bronze medalist(s)
Natalia Botello	Individual sabre	3	2	2 Q	Perroni (ARG); L 11-15	Did not advance			
Vanessa Infante	Individual sabre	2	3	4 Q	Grench (PAN); L 8-15	Did not advance			
Natalia Botello; Vanessa Infante; Julieta Toledo	Team sabre	—N/a				Colombia; W 45-36	United States; L 37-45	Bronze medal final Canada; L 38-45	4

== Field hockey ==
Mexico qualified a men's and women's team (of 16 athletes each, for a total of 32) by being ranked among the top two nations at the field hockey at the 2018 Central American and Caribbean Games tournaments.

=== Men's tournament ===
Preliminary round

Pos	Team	Pld	W	D	L	GF	GA	GD	Pts	Qualification
1	Canada	3	3	0	0	23	2	+21	9	Quarter-finals
2	United States	3	2	0	1	21	5	+16	6	Quarter-finals
3	Mexico	3	1	0	2	10	12	−2	3	Quarter-finals
4	Peru (H)	3	0	0	3	3	38	−35	0	Quarter-finals

Source: FIH
(H) Hosts

30 July 2019
14:00

Canada	5–1	Mexico
Scholfield 7', 39'; Pearson 28', 30'; Pereira 54'	Report	Aguilar 34'

Umpires:
Frederico Silva (ARG)
Hugo Romero (PAR)

1 August 2019
10:00

Mexico	8–2	Peru
Sosa 3', 54'; Aguilar 30+', 33'; Villegas 41', 57'; Sandoval 54'; Estrada 60'	Report	Vilakivi 49'; Dias Espinosa 55'

Umpires:
Reinier Diaz (CUB)
Hugo Romero (PAR)

3 August 2019
12:00

Mexico	1–5	United States
Terminel 41'	Report	Montilla 26', 55'; Sundeen 41'; Harris 43'; A. Käppeler 54'

Umpires:
Peter Wright (RSA)
Reinier Diaz (CUB)

Quarter-finals

5 August 2019
15:45

Chile	2–0	Mexico
Fel. Renz 22'; Richter 54'	Report

Umpires:
Peter Wright (RSA)
Hugo Romero (PAR)

Fifth to eighth place classification
Cross-overs

8 August 2019
11:45

Mexico	0–3	Trinidad and Tobago
	Report	Te. Marcano 43', 47'; Ta. Marcano 47'

Umpires:
Benjamin Peters (USA)
Reinier Diaz (CUB)

Seventh and eighth place

10 August 2019
09:30

Peru	0–6	Mexico
	Report	Mendez 21', 22', 51'; Castillo 30'; Aguilar 49'; Hernández 58'

Umpires:
Benjamin Peters (USA)
Reinier Diaz (CUB)

Final rank: 7th

=== Women's tournament ===
Squad

The following 16 players were named in the Mexico squad.

Head Coach: Arely Castellanos

1. Jesús Castillo (GK)
2. Mireya Bianchi
3. Mayra Lacheno
4. Maribel Acosta
6. Karen González
7. Cindy Correa
8. María Correa
10. Michel Navarro (C)
11. Jennifer Valdés
12. Montserrat Inguanzo (GK)
13. Ana Juárez
14. Marlet Correa
15. Arlette Estrada
16. Fernanda Oviedo
17. Nathalia Nava
27. Karen Orozco

Results

Pos	Team	Pld	W	D	L	GF	GA	GD	Pts	Qualification
1	United States	3	3	0	0	17	2	+15	9	Quarter-finals
2	Chile	3	2	0	1	17	4	+13	6	Quarter-finals
3	Mexico	3	1	0	2	4	7	−3	3	Quarter-finals
4	Peru (H)	3	0	0	3	0	25	−25	0	Quarter-finals

Source: FIH
(H) Hosts

29 July 2019
14:00

United States	5–0	Mexico
Grega 27'; Magadan 34'; Moyer 38'; Matson 38'; Hoffman 40'	Report

Umpires:
Maria Locatelli (ARG)
Catalina Montesino (CHI)

31 July 2019
10:00

Mexico	4–0	Peru
Estrada 28', 39'; Oveido 52'; González 59'	Report

Umpires:
Megan Robertson (CAN)
Natalia Lodeiro (URU)

2 August 2019
16:00

Mexico	0–2	Chile
	Report	García 31'; Urroz 33'

Umpires:
Liu Xiaoying (CHN)
Victoria Pazos (PAR)

Quarter-finals

4 August 2019
11:45

Canada	9–0	Mexico
Johansen 6', 41'; Donohoe 11'; Sourisseau 25', 33'; Woodcroft 28'; McManus 31'; Stairs 44'; Haughn 52'	Report

Umpires:
Catilina Montesino (CHI)
Natalia Lodeiro (URU)

Fifth to eighth place classification
Cross-overs

6 August 2019
11:45

Mexico	1–0	Cuba
Marí. Correa 12'	Report

Umpires:
Maria Locatelli (ARG)
Catalina Montesino (CHI)

Fifth and sixth place

9 August 2019
11:45

Uruguay	4–0	Mexico
Vilar del Valle 32', 39' de María 57'; Nieto 60'	Report

Umpires:
Liu Xiaoying (CHN)
Megan Robertson (CAN)

Final rank: 6th

== Football ==
Mexico qualified a men's and women's team (of 18 athletes each, for a total of 36).

=== Men's tournament ===
Squad

The 18-man squad was announced on 29 June 2019. Head coach: Jaime Lozano

No.	Pos.	Player	Date of birth (age)	Caps	Goals	Club
	GK	José Hernández	1 May 1997 (aged 22)	0	0	(Mexican Football Federation) Atlas
	GK	Luis Malagón	2 March 1997 (aged 22)	0	0	(Mexican Football Federation) Monarcas Morelia
	DF	Eric Cantú	28 February 1999 (aged 20)	0	0	(Mexican Football Federation) Monterrey
	DF	Aldo Cruz	24 September 1997 (aged 21)	0	0	(Mexican Football Federation) Tijuana
	DF	Joaquín Esquivel	7 January 1998 (aged 21)	0	0	(Mexican Football Federation) Atlético San Luis
	DF	Ismael Govea	20 February 1997 (aged 22)	0	0	(Mexican Football Federation) Atlas
	DF	Vladimir Loroña	16 November 1998 (aged 20)	0	0	(Mexican Football Federation) Puebla
	DF	Brayton Vázquez	5 March 1998 (aged 21)	0	0	(Mexican Football Federation) Atlas
	DF	Johan Vásquez	22 October 1998 (aged 20)	0	0	(Mexican Football Federation) Monterrey
	DF	Francisco Venegas	16 July 1998 (aged 21)	0	0	(Mexican Football Federation) Tigres UANL
	MF	Héctor Mascorro	12 May 1997 (aged 22)	0	0	(Mexican Football Federation) Mineros de Zacatecas
	MF	Martín Rodríguez	18 May 1998 (aged 21)	0	0	(Mexican Football Federation) Querétaro
	MF	Marcel Ruiz	26 October 2000 (aged 18)	0	0	(Mexican Football Federation) Querétaro
	FW	Eduardo Aguirre	3 August 1998 (aged 20)	0	0	(Mexican Football Federation) Santos Laguna
	FW	Ulises Cardona	13 November 1998 (aged 20)	0	0	(Mexican Football Federation) Atlas
	FW	José de Jesús Godínez	20 January 1997 (aged 22)	0	0	(Mexican Football Federation) León
	FW	Mauro Lainez	9 May 1996 (aged 23)	0	0	(Mexican Football Federation) Tijuana
	FW	Paolo Yrizar	6 August 1997 (aged 21)	0	0	(Mexican Football Federation) Querétaro

Results

Pos	Team	Pld	W	D	L	GF	GA	GD	Pts	Qualification
1	Mexico	2	1	1	0	2	1	+1	4	Knockout stage
2	Argentina	2	1	0	1	4	4	0	3	Knockout stage
3	Panama	2	0	2	0	1	1	0	2	Fifth place match
4	Ecuador	2	0	1	1	3	4	−1	1	Seventh place match

Updated to match(es) played on 1 August 2019. Source: Lima 2019
Rules for classification: Tie-breakers
29 July 2019
10:00

Panama	0−0	Mexico
	Report

Estadio Universidad San Marcos
Referee: José Argote (Venezuela)
1 August 2019
13:00

Mexico	2–1	Argentina
Venegas 13' (pen.); Godínez 81'	Report	Gaich 39'

Estadio Universidad San Marcos
Referee: Michael Espinoza (Peru)

4 August 2019
13:00

Ecuador	0–2	Mexico
	Report	Vásquez 25'; Lainez 90+5'

Estadio Universidad San Marcos
Referee: Wagner Magalhães (Brazil)

Semi-final

7 August 2019
17:30

Mexico	1–1 (a.e.t.)	Honduras
Venegas 40'	Report	Reyes 79'
Penalties
Govea (penalty missed); Vásquez (penalty scored); López (penalty missed); Macías (penalty scored)	2–4	(penalty scored) Martínez; (penalty scored) Vuelto; (penalty scored) Reyes; (penalty scored) Maldonado

Estadio Universidad San Marcos
Referee: Ulises Mereles (Paraguay)

Bronze medal match

10 August 2019
17:30

Mexico	1–0	Uruguay
Martín del Campo 7'	Report

Estadio Universidad San Marcos
Referee: Fernando Echenique (Argentina)

Final rank

=== Women's tournament ===
Squad

The following players were called up for the 2019 Pan American Games. Head Coach: Christopher Cuellar

No.	Pos.	Player	Date of birth (age)	Caps	Goals	Club
1	GK	Cecilia Santiago	19 October 1994 (age 31)	59	0	(Royal Dutch Football Association) PSV Eindhoven
12	GK	Emily Alvarado	9 June 1998 (age 28)	1	0	(United States Soccer Federation) TCU Horned Frogs
2	DF	Kenti Robles	15 February 1991 (age 35)	65	3	(Royal Spanish Football Federation) Atlético Madrid
3	DF	Bianca Sierra	25 June 1992 (age 34)	47	0	(Football Association of Iceland) Þór/KA
4	DF	Rebeca Bernal	31 August 1997 (age 28)	14	0	(Mexican Football Federation) Monterrey
5	DF	Jimena López	30 January 1999 (age 27)	8	0	(United States Soccer Federation) Texas A&M Aggies
13	DF	Arianna Romero	29 July 1992 (age 34)	42	1	(United States Soccer Federation) Houston Dash
15	DF	Andrea Sánchez	31 March 1994 (age 32)	3	0	(Mexican Football Federation) Guadalajara
6	MF	Liliana Mercado	22 October 1988 (age 37)	13	0	(Mexican Football Federation) UANL
8	MF	Joana Robles	26 July 1994 (age 32)	8	0	(Mexican Football Federation) Atlas
10	MF	Stephany Mayor	23 September 1991 (age 34)	71	11	(Football Association of Iceland) Þór/KA
11	MF	Lizbeth Ovalle	19 October 1999 (age 26)	10	2	(Mexican Football Federation) UANL
16	MF	Nancy Antonio	2 April 1996 (age 30)	12	1	(Mexican Football Federation) UANL
17	MF	María Sánchez	20 February 1996 (age 30)	15	3	(United States Soccer Federation) Chicago Red Stars
7	FW	Daniela Espinosa	13 July 1999 (age 27)	6	0	(Mexican Football Federation) América
9	FW	Charlyn Corral	11 September 1991 (age 34)	50	28	(Royal Spanish Football Federation) Atlético Madrid
14	FW	Katty Martínez	14 March 1998 (age 28)	6	0	(Mexican Football Federation) UANL
18	FW	Kiana Palacios	1 October 1996 (age 29)	11	1	(Royal Spanish Football Federation) Real Sociedad

Results

Pos	Team	Pld	W	D	L	GF	GA	GD	Pts	Qualification
1	Paraguay	3	2	1	0	5	2	+3	7	Knockout stage
2	Colombia	3	1	2	0	4	2	+2	5	Knockout stage
3	Mexico	3	1	1	1	5	4	+1	4	Fifth place match
4	Jamaica	3	0	0	3	1	7	−6	0	Seventh place match

Source: Lima 2019
Rules for classification: Tie-breakers
28 July 2019
10:00

Mexico	2–0	Jamaica
Palacios 39'; Corral 58'	Report

Estadio Universidad San Marcos
Referee: Elizabeth Tintaya (Peru)

31 July 2019
10:00

Mexico	1–2	Paraguay
Mayor 36'	Report	Cristaldo 9'; Sandoval 45'

Estadio Universidad San Marcos
Referee: Silvia Ríos (Uruguay)

3 August 2019
10:00

Mexico	2–2	Colombia
Caracas 60' (o.g.); Corral 89'		Echeverri 27'; Vanegas 36'

Estadio Universidad San Marcos
Referee: Susana Corella (Ecuador)

Fifth place match

6 August 2019
13:00

Mexico	5–1	Panama
Ovalle 1', 90+3'; Rodriguez 13'; Mayor 21'; Martínez 70'	Report	Riley 90+1' (pen.)

Estadio Universidad San Marcos
Referee: Milagros Arruela (Peru)

Final rank

- 5

== Golf ==
Mexico qualified a full team of four golfers (two men and two women).

Athlete(s)	Event	Final					
Athlete(s)	Event	Round 1	Round 2	Round 3	Round 4	Total	Rank
Raúl Cortes	Men's individual	72	67	67	71	277	12
Gonzalo Rubio	Men's individual	80	70	67	71	288	23
Ana Isabel González	Women's individual	72	73	74	71	290	9
Alejandra Llaneza	Women's individual	71	70	73	70	284	4
Raúl Cortes; Gonzalo Rubio; Ana Isabel González; Alejandra Llaneza	Mixed team	143	137	140	141	561	10

== Gymnastics ==
=== Artistic ===
Men
Team & Individual Qualification

Athlete	Event	Apparatus						Total	Rank
Athlete	Event	F	PH	R	V	PB	HB	Total	Rank
Daniel Corral	Team	14.000 Q	14.150 Q	13.100	14.100	13.000	13.300 Q	81.650	4 Q
Fabián de Luna	Team	—N/a	11.350	14.350 Q	14.250 Q	13.200	11.750	—N/a	
Isaac Núñez	Team	12.950	11.850	12.900	13.900	14.600 Q	13.100	79.300	7 Q
Francisco Javier Rojo	Team	13.300	—N/a		13.050	—N/a	12.350	—N/a	
Patricio Razo	Team	12.925	11.250	12.700	—N/a	12.550	—N/a		
Total	Team	40.250	37.350	40.350	42.250	40.800	38.750	239.750	4

Individual finals

Athlete	Event	Apparatus						Total	Rank
Athlete	Event	F	PH	R	V	PB	HB	Total	Rank
Daniel Corral	All-around	Did not start							
Daniel Corral	Floor	13.933	—N/a					13.933	5
Daniel Corral	Pommel horse	—N/a	12.583	—N/a				12.583	5
Daniel Corral	Horizontal bar	—N/a					Did not start		
Isaac Núñez	All-around	13.100	12.500	13.000	14.100	14.200	13.350	80.250	6
Isaac Núñez	Parallel bars	—N/a				14.433	—N/a	14.433	1st place, gold medalist(s)
Fabián de Luna	Rings	—N/a		14.500	—N/a			14.500	1st place, gold medalist(s)
Fabián de Luna	Vault	—N/a			14.183	—N/a		14.183	4

Women
Team & Individual Qualification

Athlete	Event	Apparatus				Total	Rank
Athlete	Event	V	UB	BB	F	Total	Rank
Paulina Campos	Team	12.500	11.650	12.250	11.650	48.050	21 Q
Daniela Briceño	Team	11.800	12.700	10.500	10.300	45.300	30
Anapaula Gutierrez	Team	13.750	12.375	11.900	11.950	49.975	16 Q
Jimena Gutierrez	Team	12.275	12.250	11.350	11.700	47.950	23
Nicolle Castro	Team	Did not start					
Total	Team	38.900	37.325	35.500	35.300	147.025	7

Individual finals

Athlete	Event	Apparatus				Total	
Athlete	Event	F	BB	V	UB	Score	Rank
Anapaula Gutierrez	All-around	13.900	11.850	11.100	10.900	47.750	15
Paulina Campos	All-around	12.050	10.950	11.500	12.100	46.600	18

=== Rhythmic ===
Individual

Athlete	Event	Final					
Athlete	Event	Hoop	Ball	Clubs	Ribbon	Total	Rank
Rut Castillo	Individual all-around	14.450	13.350	14.800	14.750 Q	57.350	10
Rut Castillo	Ribbon	—N/a			14.000	14.000	7
Karla Díaz	Individual all-around	13.250	14.300	14.850	14.550 Q	56.950	11
Karla Díaz	Ribbon	—N/a			16.200	16.200	3rd place, bronze medalist(s)

Group

Athletes	Event	Final			
Athletes	Event	5 balls	3 hoops & 2 clubs	Total	Rank
Ana Galindo; Adriana Hernández; Mildred Maldonado; Britany Sainz; Karen Villanueva	Group all-around	23.525 Q	24.850 Q	48.375	1st place, gold medalist(s)
Ana Galindo; Adriana Hernández; Mildred Maldonado; Britany Sainz; Karen Villanueva	Group 5 balls	24.400	—N/a	24.400	1st place, gold medalist(s)
Ana Galindo; Adriana Hernández; Mildred Maldonado; Britany Sainz; Karen Villanueva	Group 3 hoops & 2 clubs	—N/a	23.050	23.050	2nd place, silver medalist(s)

=== Trampoline ===
Mexico qualified a team of three gymnasts in trampoline (two men and one woman).

Athlete	Event	Qualification		Final	
Athlete	Event	Score	Rank	Score	Rank
Luis Loria	Men's individual	94.195	7 Q	53.070	6
Víctor Ezequiel Rodríguez	Men's individual	87.525	9	Did not advance	
Dafne Navarro	Women's individual	98.940	3 Q	52.510	3rd place, bronze medalist(s)

== Handball ==
=== Men's tournament ===
Pos	Team	Pld	W	D	L	GF	GA	GD	Pts	Qualification
1	Brazil	3	3	0	0	108	65	+43	6	Semifinals
2	Mexico	3	2	0	1	81	69	+12	4	Semifinals
3	Puerto Rico	3	1	0	2	72	82	−10	2	5–8th place semifinals
4	Peru (H)	3	0	0	3	56	101	−45	0	5–8th place semifinals

Source: Lima 2019
Rules for classification: 1) points; 2) head-to-head points; 3) head-to-head goal difference; 4) head-to-head goals scored; 5) goal difference; 6) goals scored; 7) draw.
(H) Hosts

31 July 2019; 18:00	Brazil	33–23	Mexico	Villa Deportiva Nacional; Referees: Zuñiga, Reyes (CUB)
31 July 2019; 18:00	Borges 9	(18–10)	Al. Villalobos 8	Villa Deportiva Nacional; Referees: Zuñiga, Reyes (CUB)
31 July 2019; 18:00	1× (yellow card) 7× (suspension)	Report	1× (suspension)	Villa Deportiva Nacional; Referees: Zuñiga, Reyes (CUB)

1 August 2019; 13:00	Mexico	24–19	Puerto Rico	Villa Deportiva Nacional; Referees: Zuñiga, Reyes (CUB)
1 August 2019; 13:00	Morales 7	(15–7)	Nazario 7	Villa Deportiva Nacional; Referees: Zuñiga, Reyes (CUB)
1 August 2019; 13:00	2× (yellow card) 3× (suspension)	Report	1× (yellow card) 5× (suspension)	Villa Deportiva Nacional; Referees: Zuñiga, Reyes (CUB)

2 August 2019; 17:30	Mexico	34–17	Peru	Villa Deportiva Nacional; Referees: Pineda, Estrada (COL)
2 August 2019; 17:30	Ávalos 9	(16–9)	Trelles, Zerillo 4	Villa Deportiva Nacional; Referees: Pineda, Estrada (COL)
2 August 2019; 17:30	5× (suspension)	Report	2× (yellow card) 3× (suspension)	Villa Deportiva Nacional; Referees: Pineda, Estrada (COL)

Semifinals

4 August 2019; 20:30	Argentina	34–14	Mexico	Villa Deportiva Nacional; Referees: Sosa, Lemes (URU)
4 August 2019; 20:30	F. Pizarro 9	(16–7)	Al. Villalobos 4	Villa Deportiva Nacional; Referees: Sosa, Lemes (URU)
4 August 2019; 20:30	1× (suspension)	Report	1× (yellow card) 1× (suspension)	Villa Deportiva Nacional; Referees: Sosa, Lemes (URU)

Bronze medal match

5 August 2019; 18:00	Brazil	32–20	Mexico	Villa Deportiva Nacional; Referees: Lenci, López (ARG)
5 August 2019; 18:00	four players 5	(16–10)	Sandoval 6	Villa Deportiva Nacional; Referees: Lenci, López (ARG)
5 August 2019; 18:00	2× (yellow card) 3× (suspension)	Report	1× (yellow card) 1× (suspension)	Villa Deportiva Nacional; Referees: Lenci, López (ARG)

Final rank: 4th

== Judo ==
Men

Athlete	Event	Round of 16	Quarterfinals	Semifinals	Repechage	Final / BM	
Athlete	Event	Opposition Result	Opposition Result	Opposition Result	Opposition Result	Opposition Result	Rank
Nabor Castillo	−66 kg	Vargas (USA); W 01-00S1	Cargnin (BRA); L 00S3-10S2	Did not advance	Bye	Bronze medal final Solís (CUB); L 00S2-10S1	5
Eduardo Araujo	−73 kg	Bye	Delpopolo (USA); W 10-00	Wong (PER); L 00S3-10S1	Bye	Bronze medal final Santos (BRA); L 00-10S1	5
Samuel Ayala	−81 kg	Angeles (PER); W 10S2-00S1	Del Orbe (DOM); L 00S2-01S1	Did not advance	Gandia (PUR); L 00S2-01S1	Did not advance	
Victor Ochoa	−90 kg	Galarreta (PER); L 00S2-01S1	Did not advance				
Alexis Esquivel	−100 kg	Bye	Smith III (USA); L 00-10	Did not advance	Medina (DOM); L 00-10	Did not advance	

Women

Athlete	Event	Round of 16	Quarterfinals	Semifinals	Repechage	Final / BM	
Athlete	Event	Opposition Result	Opposition Result	Opposition Result	Opposition Result	Opposition Result	Rank
Edna Carrillo	−48 kg	—N/a	Vargas (CHI); L 00S1-01S1	Did not advance	Alvarez (COL); W 10S2-00S3	Bronze medal final Pareto (ARG); W 00-00	3rd place, bronze medalist(s)
Luz Olvera	−52 kg	—N/a	Elizeche (ARG); W 10-00S1	Acosta (CUB); W 10-00S2	Bye	Pimenta (BRA); L 00S3-10S1	2nd place, silver medalist(s)
Elizabeth García	−57 kg	Petrocchi (ARU); W 10-00S1	Dorvigny (CUB); L 00S3-10S1	Did not advance	Fulgentes (USA); W 10-00S3	Bronze medal final Roper (PAN); L 00S3-10S1	5
Prisca Awiti	−63 kg	Bye	García (ECU); W 01S1-00S2	Del Toro (CUB); L 00S2-01S1	Bye	Martin (USA); L 00-10	5
Leslie Villarreal	−70 kg	Drysdale-D (JAM); L 00S3-10	Did not advance				
Liliana Cárdenas	−78 kg	Bye	León (VEN); L 00S3-10S1	Did not advance	Papadakis (USA); W 01-00S1	Bronze medal final Chalá (ECU); L 00S2-10	5
Priscila Martínez	+78 kg	Bye	Souza (BRA); L 00-10	Did not advance	Bolivar (PER); L 00S3-10S1	Did not advance	

== Karate ==
Kumite (sparring)

Athlete	Event	Round robin				Semifinal	Final	
Athlete	Event	Opposition Result	Opposition Result	Opposition Result	Rank	Opposition Result	Opposition Result	Rank
Enrique Estrada	Men's –60 kg	Lavín (CHI); L 5-5	Escalante (PER); W 7-0	Martínez (VEN); L 1-3	3	Did not advance		
Jesús Rodríguez	Men's –67 kg	Lindelauf (ARU); W 7-0	Ferreras (DOM); L 0-1	Figueira (BRA); L 0-1	3	Did not advance		
Alan Cuevas	Men's –84 kg	Yussuf (BOL); W 2-0	Macedo (URU); W 4-2	Madani (USA); L 0-1	2 Q	Sinisterra (COL); L 1-2 *	Did not advance	2nd place, silver medalist(s)
Alicia Hernández	Women's –50 kg	Villanueva (DOM); W 2-2	Servin (PAR); W 1-0	González (GUA); W 2-0	1 Q	De Paula (BRA); W 2-1	Shannon (USA); L 0-2	2nd place, silver medalist(s)
Paula Flores	Women's –55 kg	Astudillo (CHI); W 5-4	Kumizaki (BRA); W 1-0	Borzelli (PAN); W 1-0	1 Q	Campbell (CAN); L 1-4	Did not advance	3rd place, bronze medalist(s)
Xhunashi Caballero	Women's –61 kg	Hill (USA); W 1-0	Jumaa (CAN); W 3-0	Medina (DOM); L 1-1	2 Q	Grande (PER); L 0-3	Did not advance	3rd place, bronze medalist(s)
Guadalupe Quintal	Women's +68 kg	—N/a	Ogando (DOM); L 3-4	Aco (PER); L 0-1	3	Did not advance		

- Carlos Sinisterra eliminated for doping violation.

Kata (forms)

Athlete	Event	Pool round 1		Pool round 2		Final / BM	
Athlete	Event	Score	Rank	Score	Rank	Opposition Result	Rank
Waldo Ramírez	Men's individual	23.86	2 Q	22.66	2 Q	Bronze medal contest Wong (PER); L 24.10-24.92	5
Waldo Ramírez; Jesús Rodríguez; Diego Rosales	Men's team	24.40	1 Q	—N/a		Peru; L 24.20-25.48	2nd place, silver medalist(s)
Cinthia de la Rue	Women's individual	22.80	4	Did not advance			
Cinthia de la Rue; Pamela Contreras; Victora Cruz	Women's team	23.06	1 Q	—N/a		Dominican Republic; L 24.18-24.80	2nd place, silver medalist(s)

== Modern pentathlon ==
Athlete	Event	Fencing (Épée one touch)			Swimming (200 m freestyle)			Riding (Show jumping)			Shooting / Running (10 m laser pistol / 3000 m cross-country)			Total	
Athlete	Event	V – D	Rank	MP points	Time	Rank	MP points	Penalties	Rank	MP points	Time	Rank	MP points	MP points	Rank
Duilio Carrillo	Men's individual	19-12	13	219	2:10.39	16	290	22	12	278	11:12.00	6	628	1415	8
Manuel Padilla	Men's individual	17-14	14	217	2:12.49	17	286	EL		0	11:38.00	17	602	1105	24
José Melchor Silva	Men's individual	16-15	18	208	2:06.05	6	298	32	14	268	11:48.00	20	592	1366	14
Duilio Carrillo; José Melchor Silva	Men's relay	21-5	1	274	1:57.64	7	315	141.47	6	245	10:49.00	3	651	1485	1st place, gold medalist(s)
Mariana Arceo	Women's individual	25-6	1	271	2:19.10	2	272	15	10	285	12:16.00	564	3	1392	1st place, gold medalist(s)
Mayan Oliver	Women's individual	19-12	6	238	2:28.33	15	254	EL		0	12:07.00	573	2	1065	14
Tamara Vega	Women's individual	14-17	17	194	2:27.23	14	256	18	11	282	12:38.00	542	5	1274	7
Tamara Vega; Mayan Oliver	Women's relay	23-17	5	225	2:18.01	6	274	EL		0	12:10.00	2	570	1069	6
Mariana Arceo; Manuel Padilla	Mixed relay	34-14	3	251	2:04.61	5	301	130.84	10	256	11:19.00	3	621	1429	4

== Racquetball ==
Mexico qualified seven racquetball athletes (three men and four women).

Men

Athlete	Event	Qualifying Round robin				Round of 16	Quarterfinals	Semifinals	Final	Rank
Athlete	Event	Match 1	Match 2	Match 3	Rank	Opposition Result	Opposition Result	Opposition Result	Opposition Result	Rank
Álvaro Beltrán	Singles	Ríos (ECU); W 2-0	Camacho (CRC); W 2-0	—N/a	1 Q	Bye	Iwaasa (CAN); W 2-0	Mercado (COL); W 2-0	Montoya (MEX); L 0-2	2nd place, silver medalist(s)
Rodrigo Montoya	Singles	De León (DOM); W 2–0	Mendoza (PER); W 2–0	Moyet (CUB); W 2–0	1 Q	Ugalde (ECU); W 2-0	Murray (CAN); W 2-0	Moscoso (BOL); W 2-0	Beltrán (MEX); W 2-0	1st place, gold medalist(s)
Javier Mar; Rodrigo Montoya	Doubles	Acuña / Camacho (CRC); W 2–0	Pérez / De León (DOM); W 2–1	Moyet / Chacón (CUB); W 2–0	1 Q	Bye	Murray / Iwaasa (CAN); W 2–0	Carson / Pratt (USA); W 2–1	Moscoso / Keller (BOL); W 2–0	1st place, gold medalist(s)
Álvaro Beltrán; Javier Mar; Rodrigo Montoya	Team	—N/a				—N/a	Ecuador; W 2-0	Colombia; L 1-2	Did not advance	3rd place, bronze medalist(s)

Women

Athlete	Event	Qualifying Round robin				Round of 16	Quarterfinals	Semifinals	Final	Rank
Athlete	Event	Match 1	Match 2	Match 3	Rank	Opposition Result	Opposition Result	Opposition Result	Opposition Result	Rank
Paola Longoria	Singles	Delgado (DOM); W 2-0	Rodríguez (GUA); W 2-0	—N/a	1 Q	Bye	Barrios (BOL); W 2-0	Mendez (ARG); W 2-0	Vargas (ARG); W 2-0	1st place, gold medalist(s)
Montserrat Mejía	Singles	Rajsich (USA); L 0-2	Lambert (CAN); W 2-0	—N/a	2 Q	Muñoz (ECU); L 1-2	Did not advance			
Paola Longoria; Samantha Salas	Doubles	Muñoz / Muñoz (ECU); W 2-0	Rajsich / Lawrence (USA); W 2-0	—N/a	1 Q	Bye	Jiménez / Delgado (DOM); W 2-0	Rajsich / Lawrence (USA); W 2-0	Rodríguez / Martinez (GUA); W 2-0	1st place, gold medalist(s)
Alexandra Herrera; Paola Longoria; Montserrat Mejía; Samantha Salas	Team	—N/a				—N/a	Ecuador; W 2-0	United States; W 2-0	Argentina; W 2-0	1st place, gold medalist(s)

== Roller sports ==
=== Artistic ===
Athlete	Event	Short program		Long program		Total	
Athlete	Event	Score	Rank	Score	Rank	Score	Rank
Felipe Reyna	Men's	25.28	7	43.58	7	68.86	7

=== Speed ===
Athlete	Event	Preliminary		Semifinal		Final	
Athlete	Event	Time	Rank	Time	Rank	Time	Rank
Jorge Luis Martínez	Men's 300 m time trial	—N/a				24.777	3rd place, bronze medalist(s)
Jorge Luis Martínez	Men's 500 m	45.016	2 Q	44.002	2 Q	43.292	2nd place, silver medalist(s)
Mike Paez	Men's 10,000 m elimination	—N/a				Eliminated	
Verónica Elías	Women's 300 m time trial	—N/a				27.300	6
Verónica Elías	Women's 500 m	47.457	1 Q	48.379	2 Q	47.473	3rd place, bronze medalist(s)
Valeria Idiaquez	Women's 10,000 m elimination	—N/a				Eliminated	

== Rowing ==
Men

Athlete	Event	Heat		Repechage		Semifinal		Final A/B	
Athlete	Event	Time	Rank	Time	Rank	Time	Rank	Time	Rank
Juan Carlos Cabrera	Single sculls	7:19.16	1 Q	Bye		7:07.73	2 FA	6:51.99	2nd place, silver medalist(s)
José Alberto Arriaga; Juan José Rodríguez	Pair	6:52.55	3 F	—N/a				6:52.67	5
Andre Emil Simsch; Diego Vallejo	Double sculls	6:56.70	5 R	6:42.23	4 FB	—N/a		6:50.69	3
Alan Armenta; Alexis López	Lightweight double sculls	6:24.84	1 FA	Bye		—N/a		6:28.65	1st place, gold medalist(s)
Miguel Ángel Carballo; Hugo Salvador Carpio; Jordy Luis Gutierrez; Diego Sánchez	Quadruple sculls	6:18.92	2 F	—N/a				5:53.85	4
Angy Arthury Canul; Alexis López; Rafael Alejandro Mejía; Marco Antonio Velázquez	Lightweight four	6:21.87	3 F	—N/a				6:06.60	2nd place, silver medalist(s)
José Alberto Arriaga; Juan Flores; Miguel Ángel Carballo; Hugo Salvador Carpio; Jordy Luis Gutierrez; Alexis López; Daniel de la Rosa; Andre Simsch; Diego Sánchez	Eight	6:07.45	2 F	—N/a				5:51.43	5

Women

Athlete	Event	Heat		Repechage		Final A/B	
Athlete	Event	Time	Rank	Time	Rank	Time	Rank
Kenia Lechuga	Lightweight single sculls	7:49.87	1 FA	Bye		7:42.27	1st place, gold medalist(s)
Maite Arrilaga; Fernanda Ceballos	Pair	7:38.42	3 F	—N/a		7:46.04	3rd place, bronze medalist(s)
Naiara Arrillaga; Fabiola Nuñez	Lightweight double sculls	7:48.28	3 R	7:20.52	4 FA	7:37.62	6

== Rugby sevens ==
Mexico qualified a women's team of 12 athletes, by winning the 2018 RAN Women's Sevens.

=== Women's tournament ===
Pool stage

Pos	Team	Pld	W	D	L	PF	PA	PD	Pts	Qualification
1	Canada	3	3	0	0	134	0	+134	9	Semifinals
2	Brazil	3	2	0	1	78	31	+47	7	Semifinals
3	Peru	3	1	0	2	48	94	−46	5	5–8th place semifinals
4	Mexico	3	0	0	3	7	143	−136	3	5–8th place semifinals

Source: Lima 2019
Rules for classification: 1) Points; 2) Head-to-head result; 3) Point difference; 4) Points scored; 5) draw.

26 July 2019
11:05

Canada	54–0	Mexico
Try: Chown (2) 0'c, 4'c Crossley (2) 7'c, 7'c Levale (2) 9'c, 12'c de Couvreur 10'c Aikens 13'm Con: Nicholas (5/5) 1', 4', 7', 8', 11'; Levale (2/3) 9', 12'	Report

Villa María del Triunfo Sports Center
Referee: Natalie Barbier (Peru)

27 July 2019
11:00

Brazil	45–0	Mexico
Try: B. Silva (2) 0'm, 2'm Kochhann (2) 3'c, 4'c Costa 11'c M. Silva 13'c Cerullo 14'c Con: Kochhann (2/4) 4', 5'; Cerullo (3/3) 11', 13', 14'	Report

Villa María del Triunfo Sports Center
Referee: Emily Hsieh (United States)

27 July 2019
14:50

Peru	43–7	Mexico
Try: Flores (5) 0'm, 2'c, 3'c, 12'm, 14'm Quesada 7'c Pacheco 9'c Con: Quesada (3/6) 2', 4', 7'; Chuquivala (1/1) 9'	Report	Try: Elguezabal 11'c Con: Salomón (1/1) 11'

Villa María del Triunfo Sports Center
Referee: Shanda Mosher-Gallant (Canada)

5th-8th classification

28 July 2019
9:35

Argentina	32–7	Mexico
Try: Pedrozo (2) 0'm, 6'm Montero 3'c Aguilar (2) 4'm, 8'm Moreno 9'm Con: Otero (1/4) 4'; Aguilar (0/2)	Report	Try: Penalty try 12'

Villa María del Triunfo Sports Center
Referee: Nayara Santos (Brazil)

Seventh place match

28 July 2019
13:00

Trinidad and Tobago	0–22	Mexico
	Report	Try: Tovar 1'c Cabrera 4'm Salomón 8'm Gonzalez-Berazueta 13'm Con: Gonzalez-Berazueta (1/4) 2'

Villa María del Triunfo Sports Center
Referee: Nerea Livoni (Argentina)

Final rank: 7th

== Sailing ==
Men

Athlete	Event	Race													Total	
Athlete	Event	1	2	3	4	5	6	7	8	9	10	11	12	M	Points	Rank
David Mier y Terán	RS:X	3	3	3	4	2	1	1	1	6	7	7	6	10	47	5
Yanic Gentry	Laser	16	7	3	2	7	13	11	11	9	11	—N/a		14	88	9
Ander Belausteguigoitia; Daniel Belausteguigoitia	49er	6	6	5	7	6	7	7	7	DNS	DNS	6	5	Did not advance	71	7

Women

Athlete	Event	Race													Total	
Athlete	Event	1	2	3	4	5	6	7	8	9	10	11	12	M	Points	Rank
Demita Vega	RS:X	4	5	5	3	2	2	3	4	4	5	6	OCS	6	49	5
Elena Oetling	Laser radial	5	8	6	5	6	BFD	6	7	5	4	—N/a		8	60	5

Open

Athlete	Event	Race																					Total	
Athlete	Event	1	2	3	4	5	6	7	8	9	10	11	12	13	14	15	16	17	18	M1	M2	M3	Points	Rank
Xantos Villegas	Kites	3	4	3	4	4	3	5	4	4	6	4	4	5	8	4	7	5	3	2	5	3	69	4
Héctor Francisco Guzmán	Sunfish	9	8	4	8	12	10	13	11	13	12	—N/a								Did not advance	—N/a		87	11

== Shooting ==
Men

Pistol and rifle

Athlete	Event	Qualification		Final	
Athlete	Event	Points	Rank	Points	Rank
Daniel Urquiza	10 m air pistol	563	18	Did not advance	
David Pérez	10 m air pistol	568	9	Did not advance	
Fidencio González	25 m rapid fire pistol	554	11	Did not advance	
Antonio Tavarez	25 m rapid fire pistol	521	22	Did not advance	
Carlos Quezada	10 m air rifle	619.2	7 Q	118.3	8
Edson Ramírez	10 m air rifle	625.7 PR	1 Q	247.4	2nd place, silver medalist(s)
Carlos Quezada	50 m rifle three position	1144	12	Did not advance	
José Luis Sánchez	50 m rifle three position	1149	7 Q	439.3	3rd place, bronze medalist(s)
Jorge Martín Orozco	Trap	123	1 Q	20	5
Jesús Balboa	Trap	107	21	Did not advance	
Luis Raúl Gallardo	Skeet	118	8	Did not advance	
Carlos Segovia	Skeet	116	14	Did not advance	

Women

Pistol and rifle

Athlete	Event	Qualification		Final	
Athlete	Event	Points	Rank	Points	Rank
Mariana Nava	10 m air pistol	562	4 Q	134.9	7
Karen Quezada	10 m air pistol	555	14	Did not advance	
Alejandra Zavala	25 m pistol	576	4 Q	13	5
Karen Quezada	25 m pistol	577	3 Q	8	7
Goretti Zumaya	10 m air rifle	626.7	2 Q	184.2	5
Gabriela Martínez	10 m air rifle	622.0	3 Q	204.1	4
Michel Quezada	50 m rifle three position	1126	21	Did not advance	
Andrea Palafox	50 m rifle three position	1143	8 Q	415.7	5
Alejandra Ramírez	Trap	105	6 Q	26	3rd place, bronze medalist(s)
Cinthya Clemenz	Trap	102	7	Did not advance	
Anabel Molina	Skeet	105	9	Did not advance	
Gabriela Guadalupe Rodríguez	Skeet	118	2 Q	22	5

Mixed

Athlete	Event	Qualification		Final	
Athlete	Event	Points	Rank	Points	Rank
Mariana Nava; Daniel Urquiza	10 m air pistol	755	6	Did not advance	
Karen Quezada; David Pérez	10 m air pistol	751	10	Did not advance	
Goretti Zumaya; Carlos Quezada	10 m air rifle	825.8	7 Q	Did not advance	
Gabriela Martínez; Edson Ramírez	10 m air rifle	831.8	3 Q	432.9	3rd place, bronze medalist(s)
Alejandra Ramírez; Jorge Martín Orozco	Trap	134	6 Q	25	4
Cinthya Clemenz; Jesús Balboa	Trap	127	9	Did not advance	

== Softball ==
Mexico qualified a women's team (of 15 athletes) by being ranked in the top five nations at the 2017 Women's Pan American Championships. The men's team (also consisting of 15 athletes) qualified later by also finishing in the top five nations at the 2017 Men's Pan American Championships.

=== Men's tournament ===
Team	Pld	W	L	RF	RA	RD	Qualification
Argentina	5	5	0	29	4	+25	Qualified for the semifinals
United States	5	4	1	38	10	+28	Qualified for the semifinals
Cuba	5	3	2	33	22	+11	Qualified for the semifinals
Mexico	5	2	3	31	23	+8	Qualified for the semifinals
Venezuela	5	1	4	7	17	−10	
Peru	5	0	5	0	62	−62	

25 July 2019; 14:00	Mexico	3–4	Argentina	Softball Field, Villa María del Triunfo; Attendance: 500
25 July 2019; 14:00		Boxscore		Softball Field, Villa María del Triunfo; Attendance: 500

27 July 2019; 16:00	Mexico	11–0 (F/4)	Peru	Softball Field, Villa María del Triunfo; Attendance: 0
27 July 2019; 16:00		Boxscore		Softball Field, Villa María del Triunfo; Attendance: 0

28 July 2019; 13:00	Cuba	12–10	Mexico	Softball Field, Villa María del Triunfo; Attendance: 667
28 July 2019; 13:00		Boxscore		Softball Field, Villa María del Triunfo; Attendance: 667

29 July 2019; 13:00	Venezuela	1–5	Mexico	Softball Field, Villa María del Triunfo
29 July 2019; 13:00		Boxscore		Softball Field, Villa María del Triunfo

30 July 2019; 14:00	United States	6–2	Mexico	Softball Field, Villa María del Triunfo
30 July 2019; 14:00		Boxscore		Softball Field, Villa María del Triunfo

Semifinals

31 July 2019; 10:00	Cuba	4–7	Mexico	Softball Field, Villa María del Triunfo
31 July 2019; 10:00		Boxscore		Softball Field, Villa María del Triunfo

Final

1 August 2019; 10:00	United States	7–4	Mexico	Softball Field, Villa María del Triunfo
1 August 2019; 10:00		Boxscore		Softball Field, Villa María del Triunfo

Final rank: (bronze)

=== Women's tournament ===
Preliminary round

Team	Pld	W	L	RF	RA	RD	Qualification
United States	5	5	0	37	1	+36	Qualified for the semifinals
Canada	5	4	1	23	7	+16	Qualified for the semifinals
Puerto Rico	5	3	2	18	12	+6	Qualified for the semifinals
Mexico	5	2	3	20	17	+3	Qualified for the semifinals
Venezuela	5	1	4	9	41	−32	
Peru	5	0	5	5	34	−29	

4 August 2019; 13:00	Mexico	0–9	United States	Campo de Softbol, Lima; Attendance: 1 013
4 August 2019; 13:00		Boxscore		Campo de Softbol, Lima; Attendance: 1 013

5 August 2019; 16:00	Peru	0–9	Mexico	Campo de Softbol, Lima; Attendance: 416
5 August 2019; 16:00		Boxscore		Campo de Softbol, Lima; Attendance: 416

6 August 2019; 13:00	Venezuela	3–11	Mexico	Campo de Softbol, Lima; Attendance: 32O
6 August 2019; 13:00		Boxscore		Campo de Softbol, Lima; Attendance: 32O

7 August 2019; 13:00	Puerto Rico	1–0	Mexico	Campo de Softbol, Lima; Attendance: 0
7 August 2019; 13:00		Boxscore		Campo de Softbol, Lima; Attendance: 0

8 August 2019; 13:00	Mexico	0–4	Canada	Campo de Softbol, Lima; Attendance: 325
8 August 2019; 13:00		Boxscore		Campo de Softbol, Lima; Attendance: 325

Semifinals

9 August 2019; 10:00	Puerto Rico	3–2	Mexico	Campo de Softbol, Lima; Attendance: 300
9 August 2019; 10:00		Boxscore		Campo de Softbol, Lima; Attendance: 300

== Squash ==
Men

Athlete	Event	Group stage			Round of 16	Quarterfinal	Semifinal / Cl.	Final / BM / Pl.	
Athlete	Event	Opposition Result	Opposition Result	Rank	Opposition Result	Opposition Result	Opposition Result	Opposition Result	Rank
César Salazar	Singles	—N/a			Delierre (CAN); W 3-0	Camiruaga (CHI); W 3-0	Elías (PER); L 0-3	Did not advance	3rd place, bronze medalist(s)
Arturo Salazar	Singles	—N/a			Franklin (BER); W 3-0	Pezzota (ARG); L 2-3	Did not advance		
César Salazar; Arturo Salazar	Doubles	—N/a				Binnie / Walters (JAM); W2-0	Delierre / Sachvie (CAN); L 1-2	Did not advance	3rd place, bronze medalist(s)
César Salazar; Arturo Salazar; Alfredo Avila	Team	Peru; W 2-1	Guatemala; W 3-0	1	—N/a	Argentina; W 2-0	United States; L 1-2	Did not advance	3rd place, bronze medalist(s)

Women

Athlete	Event	Group stage				Round of 16	Quarterfinal	Semifinal	Final / BM	
Athlete	Event	Opposition Result	Opposition Result	Opposition Result	Rank	Opposition Result	Opposition Result	Opposition Result	Opposition Result	Rank
Diana Elisa García	Singles	—N/a				Rodríguez (PER); W 3-0	Blatchford (USA); L 0-3	Did not advance		
Dina Anguiano	Singles	—N/a				Naughton (CAN); L 0-3	Did not advance			
Samantha Terán; Dina Anguiano	Doubles	—N/a					L Tovar / M. Tovar (COL); L 0-2	Did not advance		
Samantha Terán; Diana Elisa García; Dina Anguiano	Team	Chile; W 3-0	United States; L 0-3	Argentina; W 3-0	2	—N/a	Guyana; W 2-0	United States; L 0-3	Did not advance	3rd place, bronze medalist(s)

Mixed

Athlete	Event	Quarterfinal	Semifinal	Final / BM	
Athlete	Event	Opposition Result	Opposition Result	Opposition Result	Rank
Diana Elisa García; Alfredo Avila	Doubles	Falcione / Miranda (ARG); W 2-0	Blatchford / Douglas (USA); W 2-0	Peláez / Rodríguez (COL); L 0-2	2nd place, silver medalist(s)

== Surfing ==
Mexico qualified five surfers (two men and three women) in the sport's debut at the Pan American Games.

Artistic

Athlete	Event	Round 1	Round 2	Round 3	Round 4	Repechage 1	Repechage 2	Repechage 3	Repechage 4	Repechage 5	Bronze medal	Final	
Athlete	Event	Opposition Result	Opposition Result	Opposition Result	Opposition Result	Opposition Result	Opposition Result	Opposition Result	Opposition Result	Opposition Result	Opposition Result	Opposition Result	Rank
Jhony Corzo	Men's open	Usuna (ARG); L 9.20-10.26	Did not advance			Madrid (URU); W 11.44-7.23	Usuna (ARG); L 5.67-13.43	Did not advance					
Felipe Rodríguez	Men's stand up paddleboard	Dinz (BRA), Hughes (USA); L 7.90 Q	Martino (PER), Gomez (COL); DNS	Did not advance		Bye	De Armas (PUR); L 10.37-12.70	Did not advance					
Shelby Detmers	Women's open	Anderson (CHI); W 12.00-7.87	Ribeiro (BRA); W 9.73-4.90	Barona (ECU); L 10.66-12.24	Did not advance	Bye			Anderson (CHI); W 9.77-9.66	Pellizzarri (ARG); L 0.43-4.33	Did not advance		
Risa Machuca	Women's longboard	Gil (ARG), D-Olin (CAN); L 3.34	Did not advance			Fernández (CHI), Bermudez (COL); L 3.33 Q	Reyes (PER); L 2.40	Did not advance					

Race

Athlete	Event	Time	Rank
Fernando Stalla	Men's stand up paddleboard	27:59.3	5
Alejandra Brito	Women's stand up paddleboard	38:29.0	7

== Swimming ==
Men

Athlete	Event	Heat		Final	
Athlete	Event	Time	Rank	Time	Rank
Gabriel Castaño	50 m freestyle	22.36	6 FA	22.23	4
Daniel Ramirez	50 m freestyle	23.00	13 FB	23.16	14
Jorge Iga	100 m freestyle	49.87	12 FB	50.00	10
Long Yuan Gutiérrez	100 m freestyle	49.73	8 FA	49.84	7
Jorge Iga	200 m freestyle	1:47.16	1 FA	1:48.18	5
Ricardo Vargas	400 m freestyle	3:54.12	7 FA	3:52.68	6
Ricardo Vargas	800 m freestyle	—N/a		7:56.78	3rd place, bronze medalist(s)
Ricardo Vargas	1500 m freestyle	—N/a		15:14.99	3rd place, bronze medalist(s)
Andy Song	100 m backstroke	56.57	12 FB	56.43	12
Andy Song	200 m backstroke	2:03.50	10 FB	2:02.95	9
Miguel de Lara	100 m breaststroke	1:01.04	6 FA	1:01.12	6
Mauro Castillo	100 m breaststroke	1:01.77	7 FA	1:01.15	7
Miguel de Lara	200 m breaststroke	2:11.82	3 FA	2:11.23	3rd place, bronze medalist(s)
Mauro Castillo	200 m breaststroke	2:13.07	4 FA	2:12.21	4
Long Yuan Gutiérrez	100 m butterfly	54.05	7 FA	53.67	6
Mateo González	100 m butterfly	54.37	11 FB	54.09	10
José Angel Martínez	200 m butterfly	2:00.73	8 FA	1:59.23	5
Héctor Ruvalcaba	200 m butterfly	2:00.31	6 FA	2:00.69	6
José Angel Martínez	200 m individual medley	2:02.54	3 FA	2:02.09	5
Héctor Ruvalcaba	200 m individual medley	2:04.06	9 FB	DSQ	
Ricardo Vargas	400 m individual medley	4:33.22	13 FB	4:35.05	13
Héctor Ruvalcaba	400 m individual medley	4:25.11	6 FA	4:24.18	6
Gabriel Castaño; Daniel Ramírez; Jorge Iga; Long Gutiérrez	4 × 100 m freestyle relay	—N/a		3:17.70	3rd place, bronze medalist(s)
Jorge Iga; Long Gutiérrez; José Angel Martínez; Ricardo Vargas	4 × 200 m freestyle relay	—N/a		7:19.43	3rd place, bronze medalist(s)
Andy Song; Mauro Castillo*; Mateo González; Daniel Ramirez*; Miguel de Lara; Jorge Iga	4 × 100 m medley relay	3:41.44	3 FA	3:40.07	4
Fernando Betanzos	10 km open water	—N/a		2:01:50.4	12
Arturo Pérez Vertti	10 km open water	—N/a		1:55:31.7	9

Women

Athlete	Event	Heat		Final	
Athlete	Event	Time	Rank	Time	Rank
Ayumi Macías	200 m freestyle	2:04.45	8 FA	2:03.41	8
María José Mata	200 m freestyle	2:04.54	9 FB	2:03.32	9
Ayumi Macías	400 m freestyle	4:15.28	6 FA	4:15.39	7
Ayumi Macías	800 m freestyle	—N/a		8:43.32	6
Regina Caracas	800 m freestyle	—N/a		8:51.90	8
Ayumi Macías	1500 m freestyle	—N/a		16:35.34	6
Regina Caracas	1500 m freestyle	—N/a		17:02.06	8
Athena Meneses	100 m backstroke	1:04.74	11 FB	1:04.20	10
Athena Meneses	200 m backstroke	2:19.74	12 FB	2:17.78	11
Celia Pulido	200 m backstroke	2:17.02	9 FB	2:17.84	12
Esther González	100 m breaststroke	1:10.22	8 FA	1:10.04	7
Byanca Rodríguez	100 m breaststroke	1:08.30	4 FA	1:07.74	4
Esther González	200 m breaststroke	2:30.26	8 FA	2:28.98	6
Byanca Rodríguez	200 m breaststroke	2:27.00	2 FA	2:25.81	4
Athena Meneses	100 m butterfly	1:02.31	12 FB	1:01.61	10
Diana Luna	100 m butterfly	1:02.05	11 FB	1:01.96	13
María José Mata	200 m butterfly	2:12.88	5 FA	2:13.12	6
Diana Luna	200 m butterfly	2:12.67	3 FA	2:13.02	4
Monika González	200 m individual medley	2:17.38	5 FA	2:15.13	4
Melissa Rodríguez	200 m individual medley	2:20.77	11 FB	2:21.81	11
Monika González	400 m individual medley	4:53.42	7 FA	4:53.75	8
Marie Ximena Conde	400 m individual medley	4:59.08	9 FB	5:57.84	9
Tayde Revilak; Athena Meneses; María José Mata; Monika González	4 × 100 m freestyle relay	—N/a		DSQ	
María José Mata; Ayumi Macías; Monika González; Marie Ximena Conde	4 × 200 m freestyle relay	—N/a		8:19.97	5
Athena Meneses*; Esther González*; Diana Luna; Tayde Revilak*; Celia Pulido; Melissa Rodríguez; Monika González	4 × 100 m medley relay	4:16.69	5 FB	4:11.15	5
Martha Rocio Sandoval	10 km open water	—N/a		2:03:44.4	8
Martha Ruth Aguilar	10 km open water	—N/a		2:07:46.7	12

Mixed

Athlete	Event	Heat		Final	
Athlete	Event	Time	Rank	Time	Rank
Marie Conde*; Monika González; Jorge Iga; José Angel Martínez*; María José Mata; Daniel Ramírez; Tayde Revilak*	4 × 100 m freestyle relay	3:37.68	4 FA	3:31.36	3rd place, bronze medalist(s)
Celia Pulido; Esther González*; Mateo González*; José Angel Martínez*; Byanca Rodríguez; Long Yuan Gutiérrez; Jorge Iga	4 × 100 m medley relay	4:01.65	5 FA	3:53.85	4

== Table tennis ==
Men

Athlete	Event	Group stage			First round	Second round	Quarterfinal	Semifinal	Final / BM	
Athlete	Event	Opposition Result	Opposition Result	Rank	Opposition Result	Opposition Result	Opposition Result	Opposition Result	Opposition Result	Rank
Marcos Madrid	Singles	—N/a			Correa (VEN); W 4-1	Kumar (USA); W 4-2	Calderano (BRA); L 0-4	Did not advance		
Ricardo Villa	Singles	—N/a			Gomez (CHI); L 1-4	Did not advance				
Marcos Madrid; Ricardo Villa	Doubles	—N/a			Blas / Chavez (BAR); W 4-1	—N/a	Afanador / González (PUR); L 3-4	Did not advance		
Miguel Angel Lara; Marcos Madrid; Ricardo Villa	Team	Brazil; L 0-3	Canada; L 2-3	3	—N/a		Did not advance			

Women

Athlete	Event	Group stage			First round	Second round	Quarterfinal	Semifinal	Final / BM	
Athlete	Event	Opposition Result	Opposition Result	Rank	Opposition Result	Opposition Result	Opposition Result	Opposition Result	Opposition Result	Rank
Clio Barcenas	Singles	—N/a			Argüelles (ARG); L 0-4	Did not advance				
Yadira Silva	Singles	—N/a			Mori (PER); W 4-1	Zhang (CAN); W 4-1	Diaz (PUR); L 3-4	Did not advance		
Clio Barcenas; Yadira Silva	Doubles	—N/a			Medina / Perdomo (COL); W 4-1	—N/a	Wu / Zhang (USA); L 0-4	Did not advance		
Clio Barcenas; Monica Muñoz; Yadira Silva	Team	Brazil; L 1-3	Colombia; W 3-1	2 Q	—N/a		Canada; L 0-3	Did not advance		

Mixed

Athlete	Event	First round	Quarterfinal	Semifinal	Final / BM	
Athlete	Event	Opposition Result	Opposition Result	Opposition Result	Opposition Result	Rank
Marcos Madrid; Yadira Silva	Doubles	Enriquez / Gatica (GUA); W 4-2	Takahashi / Tsuboi (BRA); L 1-4	Did not advance		

== Taekwondo ==
Kyorugi
Men

Athlete	Event	Round of 16	Quarterfinal	Semifinal	Repechage	Final / BM	
Athlete	Event	Opposition Result	Opposition Result	Opposition Result	Opposition Result	Opposition Result	Rank
Brandon Plaza	–58 kg	Bye	Ochoa (COL); W 28-8	Granado (VEN); W 39-28	Bye	Guzmán (ARG); L 17-19	2nd place, silver medalist(s)
Rubén Nava	–68 kg	López (CUB); W 27-6	Nkogho (CAN); L 12-16	Did not advance			
René Lizárraga	–80 kg	Rodriguez (URU); W 22-2	Trejos (COL); L 6-7	Did not advance	Aurora (PER); W 14-5	Bronze medal final Hernández (DOM); L 5-8	=5
Carlos Sansores	+80 kg	Luis Alvarez (VEN); W 12-8	Alvarez (PUR); W 15-4	Alba (CUB); W 25-33	—N/a	Bronze medal final Sio (ARG); W 17-13	3rd place, bronze medalist(s)

Women

Athlete	Event	Round of 16	Quarterfinal	Semifinal	Repechage	Final / BM	
Athlete	Event	Opposition Result	Opposition Result	Opposition Result	Opposition Result	Opposition Result	Rank
Daniela Souza	–49 kg	Bucheli (ECU); W 25-11	Diez (PER); W 9-0	Aguirre (CUB); W 14-3	Bye	Jezierski (BRA); W 4-2	1st place, gold medalist(s)
Fabiola Villegas	–57 kg	Martínez (VEN); W 15-4	Carstens (PAN); L 15-35	Did not advance			
Victoria Heredia	–67 kg	Bye	Acosta (CUB); L 1-5	Did not advance			
Briseida Acosta	+67 kg	Bye	Fernandez (VEN); W 7-3	Carbonell (CUB); W 11-8	—N/a	Mosquera (COL); W 10-5	1st place, gold medalist(s)

Poomsae

Athlete	Event	Final	
Athlete	Event	Score	Rank
Marco Arroyo	Men's individual	7.480	3rd place, bronze medalist(s)
Paula Fregoso	Women's individual	7.660	1st place, gold medalist(s)
Ana Zulema Ibañez; Leonardo Juarez	Mixed pair	7.440	1st place, gold medalist(s)
Paula FregosoAna Zulema Ibañez; Daniela Rodríguez; Leonardo Juarez; Marco Arroyo	Mixed freestyle team	6.920	4

== Tennis ==
Men

Athlete	Event	Round of 64	Round of 32	Round of 16	Quarterfinal	Semifinal	Final / BM	
Athlete	Event	Opposition Result	Opposition Result	Opposition Result	Opposition Result	Opposition Result	Opposition Result	Rank
Alan Rubio	Singles	Bye	González (COL); L 0–6,1–6	Did not advance				
Manuel Sánchez	Singles	González (GUA); L 4–6,3–6	Did not advance					
Alex Hernández	Singles	Lewis (BAR); L 3–6,6–7	Did not advance					
Alex Hernández; Alan Rubio	Doubles	—N/a	Bye	Arias / Zeballos (BOL); L 1–6,2–6	Did not advance			

Women

Athlete	Event	Round of 32	Round of 16	Quarterfinal	Semifinal	Final / BM	
Athlete	Event	Opposition Result	Opposition Result	Opposition Result	Opposition Result	Opposition Result	Rank
Giuliana Olmos	Singles	Stefani (BRA); L 2–6,7–6,2–6	Did not advance				
Marcela Zacarías	Singles	Pella (ARG); W 6–2,6–1	Dolehide (USA); L 1–6,7–6,1–6	Did not advance			
Renata Zarazúa	Singles	Guzmán (PER); W 6–1, 6–1	Graham (USA); W 7–6,6–4	Alves (BRA); L 2–6,0–6	Did not advance		
Giuliana Olmos; Renata Zarazúa	Doubles	—N/a	Bye	Cepede Royg / González (PAR); L 7–6,3–6,4–10	Did not advance		

Mixed

Athlete	Event	Round of 16	Quarterfinal	Semifinal	Final / BM	
Athlete	Event	Opposition Result	Opposition Result	Opposition Result	Opposition Result	Rank
Giuliana Olmos; Manuel Sánchez	Doubles	Bye	Zeballos / Zeballos (BOL); L 2–6,6–2,5–10	Did not advance		

== Triathlon ==
Individual

Athlete	Event	Swimming (1.5 km)	Transition 1	Biking (40 km)	Transition 2	Running (10 km)	Total	Rank
Edson Gómez	Men's	17:39	0:53	1:00:34	0:21	34:04	1:53:30	16
Crisanto Grajales	Men's	17:48	0:49	1:00:26	0:25	31:12	1:50:39	1st place, gold medalist(s)
Irving Pérez	Men's	17:53	0:49	1:00:21	0:23	31:41	1:51:06	4
Cecilia Pérez	Women's	19:53	0:55	1:04:41	0:28	36:10	2:02:07	3rd place, bronze medalist(s)
Claudia Rivas	Women's	19:56	0:59	1:04:35	0:27	37:25	2:03:22	8
Jessica Romero	Women's	19:57	1:07	1:06:49	0:27	37:48	2:06:08	12

Mixed relay

Athlete	Event	Time	Rank
Cecilia Pérez; Claudia Rivas; Crisanto Grajales; Irving Pérez	Mixed relay	1:20:57	3rd place, bronze medalist(s)

== Volleyball ==
=== Beach ===
Mexico qualified four beach volleyball athletes (two men and two women).

Athletes	Event	Preliminary Round			Round of 16	Quarterfinals	Semifinals	Finals	Rank
Athletes	Event	Opposition Score	Opposition Score	Opposition Score	Opposition Score	Opposition Score	Opposition Score	Opposition Score	Rank
Lombardo Ontiveros; Juan Virgen	Men's tournament	Grimalt – Grimalt (CHI); L 1–2	Nusbaum – Plantinga (CAN); W 2-0	Mora – López (NCA); W 2-0	Escobar – Vargas (ESA); W 2-0	Brandão – Dealtry (BRA); W 2-0	Capogrosso – Azaad (ARG); W 2-1	Grimalt – Grimalt (CHI); L 1–2	2nd place, silver medalist(s)
Martha Revuelta; Zayra Orellana	Women's tournament	Mardones – Rivas (CHI); L 0–2	Charles – Valenciana (ISV); W 2-0	Horta – Reboucas (BRA); L0-2	Caballero – Valiente (PAR); L 1-2	—N/a	9th-12th place classification Harnett – Lapointe (CAN); L 0-2	11th place match Mendoza – Rodriguez (NCA); W 2-0	11

=== Indoor ===
Summary

Team	Event	Group stage				Semifinal	Final / BM / Pl.	
Team	Event	Opposition Result	Opposition Result	Opposition Result	Rank	Opposition Result	Opposition Result	Rank
Mexico men	Men's tournament	Brazil; L 1–3	United States; L 0–3	Chile; L 1–3	4	—N/a	Seventh place match Peru; V 3–1	7

Men's tournament

Pos	Team	Pld	W	L	Pts	SW	SL	SR	SPW	SPL	SPR	Qualification
1	Brazil	3	3	0	11	9	4	2.250	303	260	1.165	Semifinals
2	Chile	3	2	1	9	7	5	1.400	263	266	0.989	Semifinals
3	United States	3	1	2	8	6	6	1.000	252	270	0.933	5th–6th place match
4	Mexico	3	0	3	2	2	9	0.222	246	268	0.918	7th–8th place match

Source: Lima 2019

31 July 2019; 20:30	Brazil	3–1	Mexico	Callao Sports Center; Referees: Brian Hemelgarn (USA), Josmer Perez (DOM)
31 July 2019; 20:30	(25–23, 25–19, 22–25, 25–22); P2 P3			Callao Sports Center; Referees: Brian Hemelgarn (USA), Josmer Perez (DOM)

1 August 2019; 18:30	United States	3–0	Mexico	Callao Sports Center; Referees: Nicolás Casado (ARG), Josmer Perez (DOM)
1 August 2019; 18:30	(26–24, 25–22, 25–23); P2 P3			Callao Sports Center; Referees: Nicolás Casado (ARG), Josmer Perez (DOM)

2 August 2019; 18:30	Mexico	1–3	Chile	Callao Sports Center; Referees: Walter Vera (PER), Nicolas Casado (ARG)
2 August 2019; 18:30	(25–20, 21–25, 22–25, 20–25); P2 P3			Callao Sports Center; Referees: Walter Vera (PER), Nicolas Casado (ARG)

7th–8th place match

3 August 2019; 12:30	Peru	1–3	Mexico	Callao Sports Center; Referees: Ricardo Borroto (PUR), Nicolás Casado (ARG)
3 August 2019; 12:30	(25–27, 24–26, 27–25, 13–25); P2 P3			Callao Sports Center; Referees: Ricardo Borroto (PUR), Nicolás Casado (ARG)

Final rank: 7th

== Water polo ==
Summary

Team	Event	Group stage				Quarterfinal	Semifinal	Final / BM / Pl.	
Team	Event	Opposition Result	Opposition Result	Opposition Result	Rank	Opposition Result	Opposition Result	Opposition Result	Rank
Mexico men	Men's tournament	Argentina; L 11–13	Brazil; L 5–10	Peru; W 14–8	3 Q	Canada; L 11–13	5th-8th place classification Puerto Rico; L 14–15 (PSO)	Seventh place match Peru; W 16–5	7
Mexico women	Women's tournament	Peru; L 22–1	Cuba; L 4–13	Canada; L 6–27	3 Q	Brazil; L 3–13	5th-8th place classification Venezuela; W 13–6	Fifth place match Puerto Rico; L 12–13 (PSO)	6

=== Men's tournament ===
Pos	Team	Pld	W	D	L	GF	GA	GD	Pts	Qualification
1	Brazil	3	3	0	0	36	14	+22	6	Quarterfinals
2	Argentina	3	2	0	1	32	29	+3	4	Quarterfinals
3	Mexico	3	1	0	2	30	31	−1	2	Quarterfinals
4	Peru (H)	3	0	0	3	16	40	−24	0	Quarterfinals

Source: Lima 2019
Rules for classification: 1) points; 2) head-to-head points; 3) head-to-head goal difference; 4) head-to-head number of goals scored; 5) goal difference.
(H) Hosts

4 August 2019; 19:30	Report	Mexico	11–13	Argentina	Villa María del Triunfo Aquatic Centre, Lima; Referees: Marie-Claude Deslières (CAN); Boris Margeta (SLO)
4 August 2019; 19:30	Report	Score by quarters: 0–3, 3–6, 5–3, 3–1			Villa María del Triunfo Aquatic Centre, Lima; Referees: Marie-Claude Deslières (CAN); Boris Margeta (SLO)
4 August 2019; 19:30	Report	Juárez 3	Goals	Camnasio 5	Villa María del Triunfo Aquatic Centre, Lima; Referees: Marie-Claude Deslières (CAN); Boris Margeta (SLO)

5 August 2019; 16:30	Report	Mexico	5–10	Brazil	Villa María del Triunfo Aquatic Centre, Lima; Referees: Amber Drury (USA); Doriel Terpenka (CAN)
5 August 2019; 16:30	Report	Score by quarters: 0–2, 0–1, 4–3, 1–4			Villa María del Triunfo Aquatic Centre, Lima; Referees: Amber Drury (USA); Doriel Terpenka (CAN)
5 August 2019; 16:30	Report	Álvarez, Mercado 2	Goals	Guimarães 3	Villa María del Triunfo Aquatic Centre, Lima; Referees: Amber Drury (USA); Doriel Terpenka (CAN)

6 August 2019; 16:30	Report	Peru	8–14	Mexico	Villa María del Triunfo Aquatic Centre, Lima; Referees: Yasmany Lima (CUB); Leonardo González (VEN)
6 August 2019; 16:30	Report	Score by quarters: 1–4, 0–3, 4–3, 3–4			Villa María del Triunfo Aquatic Centre, Lima; Referees: Yasmany Lima (CUB); Leonardo González (VEN)
6 August 2019; 16:30	Report	Villar 3	Goals	Álvarez 4	Villa María del Triunfo Aquatic Centre, Lima; Referees: Yasmany Lima (CUB); Leonardo González (VEN)

Quarterfinals

8 August 2019; 15:00	Report	Canada	13–11	Mexico	Villa María del Triunfo Aquatic Centre, Lima; Referees: Steven Rotsart (USA); Juan Menéndez (CUB)
8 August 2019; 15:00	Report	Score by quarters: 4–4, 3–4, 3–2, 3–1			Villa María del Triunfo Aquatic Centre, Lima; Referees: Steven Rotsart (USA); Juan Menéndez (CUB)
8 August 2019; 15:00	Report	Constantin-Bicari, D'Souza 4	Goals	Álvarez 5	Villa María del Triunfo Aquatic Centre, Lima; Referees: Steven Rotsart (USA); Juan Menéndez (CUB)

5–8th place semifinals

9 August 2019; 15:00	Report	Mexico	14–15 (PSO)	Puerto Rico	Villa María del Triunfo Aquatic Centre, Lima; Referees: Fabio Toffoli (BRA); Doriel Terpenka (CAN)
9 August 2019; 15:00	Report	Score by quarters: 4–5, 5–5, 1–2, 3–1 PSO: 1–2			Villa María del Triunfo Aquatic Centre, Lima; Referees: Fabio Toffoli (BRA); Doriel Terpenka (CAN)
9 August 2019; 15:00	Report	Velázquez 4	Goals	five players 2	Villa María del Triunfo Aquatic Centre, Lima; Referees: Fabio Toffoli (BRA); Doriel Terpenka (CAN)

Seventh place game

10 August 2019; 15:00	Report	Mexico	16–5	Peru	Villa María del Triunfo Aquatic Centre, Lima; Referees: Yasmany Lima (CUB); Reinel Castillo (PUR)
10 August 2019; 15:00	Report	Score by quarters: 4–0, 4–0, 5–3, 3–2			Villa María del Triunfo Aquatic Centre, Lima; Referees: Yasmany Lima (CUB); Reinel Castillo (PUR)
10 August 2019; 15:00	Report	Álvarez 8	Goals	five players 1	Villa María del Triunfo Aquatic Centre, Lima; Referees: Yasmany Lima (CUB); Reinel Castillo (PUR)

=== Women's tournament ===
Preliminary round

Pos	Team	Pld	W	D	L	GF	GA	GD	Pts	Qualification
1	Canada	3	3	0	0	75	13	+62	6	Quarterfinals
2	Cuba	3	2	0	1	37	29	+8	4	Quarterfinals
3	Mexico	3	1	0	2	32	41	−9	2	Quarterfinals
4	Peru (H)	3	0	0	3	8	69	−61	0	Quarterfinals

Source: Lima 2019
Rules for classification: 1) points; 2) head-to-head points; 3) head-to-head goal difference; 4) head-to-head number of goals scored; 5) goal difference.
(H) Hosts

4 August 2019; 12:30	Report	Peru	1–22	Mexico	Villa María del Triunfo Aquatic Centre, Lima; Referees: Daniel Daners (URU); Diego Garibaldi (ARG)
4 August 2019; 12:30	Report	Score by quarters: 0-8, 1-5, 0-6, 0-3			Villa María del Triunfo Aquatic Centre, Lima; Referees: Daniel Daners (URU); Diego Garibaldi (ARG)
4 August 2019; 12:30	Report	Asmat 1	Goals	Livas 5	Villa María del Triunfo Aquatic Centre, Lima; Referees: Daniel Daners (URU); Diego Garibaldi (ARG)

5 August 2019; 12:30	Report	Cuba	13–4	Mexico	Villa María del Triunfo Aquatic Centre, Lima; Referees: Leonardo González (VEN); Fabio Toffoli (BRA)
5 August 2019; 12:30	Report	Score by quarters: 3-1, 2-0, 3-2, 5-1			Villa María del Triunfo Aquatic Centre, Lima; Referees: Leonardo González (VEN); Fabio Toffoli (BRA)
5 August 2019; 12:30	Report	Leyva, Villa 4	Goals	four players 1	Villa María del Triunfo Aquatic Centre, Lima; Referees: Leonardo González (VEN); Fabio Toffoli (BRA)

6 August 2019; 12:30	Report	Canada	27–6	Mexico	Villa María del Triunfo Aquatic Centre, Lima; Referees: Steven Rotsart (USA); Fabio Toffoli (BRA)
6 August 2019; 12:30	Report	Score by quarters: 6-3, 5-1, 9-1, 7-1			Villa María del Triunfo Aquatic Centre, Lima; Referees: Steven Rotsart (USA); Fabio Toffoli (BRA)
6 August 2019; 12:30	Report	Wright 5	Goals	Ramírez 2	Villa María del Triunfo Aquatic Centre, Lima; Referees: Steven Rotsart (USA); Fabio Toffoli (BRA)

Quarterfinal

8 August 2019; 08:00	Report	Brazil	13–3	Mexico	VMT Aquatic Centre, Lima; Referees: Arkadi Voevodin (RUS); Amber Marie Drury (USA)
8 August 2019; 08:00	Report	Score by quarters: 2–1, 2–1, 4–0, 5–1			VMT Aquatic Centre, Lima; Referees: Arkadi Voevodin (RUS); Amber Marie Drury (USA)

5th–8th place semifinals

9 August 2019; 08:00	Report	Mexico	13–6	Venezuela	VMT Aquatic Centre, Lima; Referees: Diego Garibaldi (ARG); Juan Menéndez (CUB)
9 August 2019; 08:00	Report	Score by quarters: 5–1, 1–3, 4–0, 3–2			VMT Aquatic Centre, Lima; Referees: Diego Garibaldi (ARG); Juan Menéndez (CUB)

Fifth place match

10 August 2019; 09:30	Report	Mexico	12–13 (PSO)	Puerto Rico	VMT Aquatic Centre, Lima; Referees: Daniel Federico Daners (URU); Leonardo González Toledo (VEN)
10 August 2019; 09:30	Report	Score by quarters: 1–3, 3–2, 4–4, 2–1 PSO: 2–3			VMT Aquatic Centre, Lima; Referees: Daniel Federico Daners (URU); Leonardo González Toledo (VEN)

== Water skiing ==
Men

Athlete	Event	Preliminary		Final	
Athlete	Event	Score	Rank	Score	Rank
Alvaro Lamadrid	Slalom	2.50/58/10.75	6 Q	4.50/58/11.25	8
Alvaro Lamadrid	Jump	136	9 Q	140	7
Alvaro Lamadrid	Tricks	3140	12	Did not advance	
Alvaro Lamadrid	Overall	1662.19	11	Did not advance	
Carlos Lamadrid	Slalom	2.00/58/10.75	7 Q	4.00/58/10.75	3rd place, bronze medalist(s)
Patricio Font	Slalom	3.00/58/11.25	10	Did not advance	
Patricio Font	Tricks	11580	1 Q	11370	1st place, gold medalist(s)
Patricio Font	Overall	1873.79	9	Did not advance	
Patricio González	Wakeboard	82.89	1 Q	69.67	3rd place, bronze medalist(s)

Women

Athlete	Event	Preliminary		Final	
Athlete	Event	Score	Rank	Score	Rank
Sandra Chapoy	Slalom	2.00/55/12.00	7	Did not advance	
Sandra Chapoy	Jump	145	5 Q	148	4
Sandra Chapoy	Tricks	5290	11	Did not advance	
Sandra Chapoy	Overall	2024.66	6 Q	2054.55	5
Lorena Vergara	Wakeboard	51.44	4 Q	61.11	5

== Weightlifting ==
Mexico qualified eight weightlifters (four men and four women).

Men

Athlete	Event	Snatch		Clean & jerk		Total	
Athlete	Event	Weight	Rank	Weight	Rank	Weight	Rank
Antonio Vázquez	–61 kg	123	4	163	3	286	3rd place, bronze medalist(s)
Jonathan Muñoz	–67 kg	138	1	168	1	306	1st place, gold medalist(s)
Jorge Cárdenas	–73 kg	142	4	168	4	310	4
Raúl Manriquez	+109 kg	175	4	218	=2	393	3rd place, bronze medalist(s)

Women

Athlete	Event	Snatch		Clearn & jerk		Total	
Athlete	Event	Weight	Rank	Weight	Rank	Weight	Rank
Ana Gabriela López	–55 kg	91	3	111	2	202	3rd place, bronze medalist(s)
Janeth Gómez	–59 kg	95	3	119	4	214	4
Aremi Fuentes	–76 kg	110	2	140	=1	250	2nd place, silver medalist(s)
Ana Carmen Torres	–87 kg	104	6	135	5	239	5

== Wrestling ==
Key:

- VT – Victory by fall.
- PP – Decision by points – the loser with technical points.
- PO – Decision by points – the loser without technical points.
- SP – Technical superiority – the loser with technical points and a margin of victory of at least 9 (Greco-Roman) or 10 (freestyle) points.
- ST – Great superiority – the loser without technical points and a margin of victory of at least 8 (Greco-Roman) or 10 (freestyle) points.
- VA – Decision by withdrawal

Men

Athlete	Event	Round of 16	Quarterfinal	Semifinal	Final / BM	
Athlete	Event	Opposition Result	Opposition Result	Opposition Result	Opposition Result	Rank
Brandon Díaz	Freestyle 65 kg	—N/a	Rudesindo (DOM); L 0-4^{SP}	Did not advance	Sánchez (ECU); L 0–3^{PO}	5
Christian Anguiano	Freestyle 86 kg	Bye	Ceballos (VEN); L 0-4^{SP}	Did not advance	Izquierdo (COL); L 1–3^{PP}	5
Emilio Perez	Greco-Roman 60 kg	—N/a	Pimentel (DOM); W 4-0^{SP}	Toro (COL); L 0-4^{SP}	Bronze medal final Hafizov (USA); L 1-3^{PP}	5
Manuel López	Greco-Roman 67 kg	—N/a	Villegas (VEN); L 1-3^{PP}	Did not advance	Bronze medal final Soto (PER); W 3-1^{PP}	(silver) ^{[a]}
Emmanuel Benitez	Greco-Roman 77 kg	Bye	Hurtado (PER); W 4-0^{SP}	Smith (USA); L 1-3^{PP}	Bronze medal final Cuero (COL); L 1-3^{PP}	5
Alfonso Leyva	Greco-Roman 87 kg	Bye	Almendra (PAN); W 0–4^{SP}	Muñoz (COL); W 3-1^{PP}	Avendaño (VEN); L 1–3^{PP}	2nd place, silver medalist(s)

- ^{67 kg} Shalom Villegas, from Venezuela, lost the silver medal for a doping violation.

Women

Athlete	Event	Round of 16	Quarterfinal	Semifinal	Final / BM	
Athlete	Event	Opposition Result	Opposition Result	Opposition Result	Opposition Result	Rank
Mariana Díaz Muñoz	50 kg	—N/a	Barbosa (BRA); L 1-3^{PP}	Did not advance		
Alejandra Romero	57 kg	Bye	Antes (ECU); L 1-3^{PP}	Did not advance	Rodriguez (PUR); L 1–3^{PP}	5
Ambar Garnica	68 kg	—N/a	Chavez (HON); W 5-0^{VT}	Mensah (USA); L 0-5^{VT}	Bronze medal final Sovero (PER); W 2-1^{PP}	3rd place, bronze medalist(s)

== See also ==
- Mexico at the 2020 Summer Olympics
