= Canoeing at the 2019 Pan American Games – Women's extreme slalom K-1 =

Women's extreme canoe slalom K-1 at the 2019 Pan American Games
- Venue: Cañete River, Lunahuaná
- Date: 2-4 August
- Competitors: 9 from 9 nations

Medalists
Gold medal	Ana Sátila	Brazil
Silver medal	Evy Leibfarth	United States
Bronze medal	Sofía Reinoso	Mexico

The women's extreme canoe slalom K-1 competition at the 2019 Pan American Games in Lima took place between 2 and 4 August at the Cañete River in Lunahuaná.

The gold medal was won by Ana Sátila of the Brazil.

== Schedule ==
All times are Local Time (UTC−5).

Date	Time	Round
Friday, 2 August 2019	12:05	Heats
Sunday, 4 August 2019	15:17	Semi-final
Sunday, 4 August 2019	16:15	Final

== Results ==
=== Heats ===
Heat	Rank	Name	Nation	Notes
1	1	Ana Sátila	Brazil	Q
1	2	Ana Fernández	Paraguay	Q
1	3	Constanza Nobis	Chile	
2	1	Lois Betteridge	Canada	Q
2	2	Maria Luz Cassini	Argentina	Q
2	3	Mariana Torres	Venezuela	DSQ
3	1	Evy Leibfarth	United States	Q
3	2	Sofía Reinoso	Mexico	Q
3	3	Lenni Ramírez	Peru	

=== Semifinals ===
Heat	Rank	Name	Nation	Notes
1	1	Maria Luz Cassini	Argentina	Q
1	2	Sofía Reinoso	Mexico	Q
1	3	Lois Betteridge	Canada	
2	1	Ana Sátila	Brazil	Q
2	2	Evy Leibfarth	United States	Q
2	3	Ana Fernández	Paraguay	DSQ

=== Final ===
Rank	Name	Nation	Notes
1st place, gold medalist(s)	Ana Sátila	Brazil	
2nd place, silver medalist(s)	Evy Leibfarth	United States	
3rd place, bronze medalist(s)	Sofía Reinoso	Mexico	
4	Maria Luz Cassini	Argentina	
