= Canoeing at the 2019 Pan American Games – Women's slalom K-1 =

Women's canoe slalom K-1 at the 2019 Pan American Games
- Venue: Cañete River, Lunahuaná
- Date: 3-4 August
- Competitors: 9 from 9 nations
- Winning time: 93.70

Medalists
Gold medal	Evy Leibfarth	United States
Silver medal	Nadia Riquelme	Argentina
Bronze medal	Sofía Reinoso	Mexico

The women's canoe slalom K-1 competition at the 2019 Pan American Games in Lima took place between 3 and 4 August at the Cañete River in Lunahuaná.

The gold medal was won by Evy Leibfarth of the United States.

== Schedule ==
All times are Local Time (UTC−5).

Date	Time	Round
Saturday, 3 August 2019	10:32	Heats
Sunday, 4 August 2019	10:20	Semi-final
Sunday, 4 August 2019	11:59	Final

== Results ==
Rank	Name	Preliminary Heats						Semifinal			Final	
Rank	Name	1st Ride	Pen.	2nd Ride	Pen.	Best	Rank	Time	Pen.	Rank	Time	Pen.
1st place, gold medalist(s)	Evy Leibfarth (USA)	85.88	0	86.13	0	85.88	1	97.02	2	1	93.70	0
2nd place, silver medalist(s)	Nadia Riquelme (ARG)	99.94	2	101.86	4	99.94	3	115.05	6	4	103.70	0
3rd place, bronze medalist(s)	Sofía Reinoso (MEX)	104.03	2	106.33	4	104.03	6	115.15	6	5	112.20	2
4	Olivia Norman (CAN)	103.50	4	108.87	4	103.50	5	112.19	0	3	114.59	0
5	Ana Fernández (PAR)	103.37	0	103.70	0	103.37	4	115.64	2	6	116.43	2
6	Omira Estácia Neta (BRA)	92.07	2	92.79	2	92.07	2	97.72	0	2	150.74	52
7	María Inzunza (CHI)	118.79	4	115.81	8	115.81	7	134.35	10	7	did not advance	
8	Lenni Ramírez (PER)	133.41	6	130.90	10	130.90	8	did not advance				
9	Emily Vega (VEN)	322.65	154	195.38	14	195.38'	9	did not advance				
