= Basque pelota at the 2019 Pan American Games – Men's doubles trinquete rubber ball =

Basque pelota – Men's doubles trinquete rubber ball at the 2019 Pan American Games
- Venue: Villa María del Triunfo Center
- Dates: 4–10 August
- Competitors: 10 from 5 nations

Medalists
| Gold medal | Santiago Andreasen; Sebastián Andreasen | Argentina |
| Silver medal | Daniel García; Isaac Pérez | Mexico |
| Bronze medal | Manuel Domínguez; Esteban Romero | Chile |

The men's doubles trinquete rubber ball basque pelota event at the 2019 Pan American Games was held from 4–10 August at the Basque pelota courts in the Villa María del Triunfo Sports Center in Lima, Peru. The Argentine team won the gold medal, after defeating Mexico in the final.

== Results ==
=== Preliminary round ===
The preliminary stage consisted of a single round robin group where every doubles team played each other once. At the end of this stage, the first two teams then played a final match for the gold medal, while the third and fourth played for bronze.

| Pos | Team | Pld | W | L | PF | PA | PD | Pts |
|---|---|---|---|---|---|---|---|---|
| 1 | Argentina Santiago Andreasen Sebastián Andreasen | 4 | 4 | 0 | 120 | 54 | +66 | 12 |
| 2 | Mexico Daniel García Isaac Pérez | 4 | 3 | 1 | 111 | 70 | +41 | 10 |
| 3 | Chile Manuel Domínguez Esteban Romero | 4 | 2 | 2 | 100 | 98 | +2 | 8 |
| 4 | Uruguay Aparicio Guichón Lucas Rivas | 4 | 1 | 3 | 79 | 110 | −31 | 6 |
| 5 | Peru André Bellido Edson Velásquez | 4 | 0 | 4 | 42 | 120 | −78 | 4 |

Updated to match(es) played on 10 August 2019. Source: Lima 2019

All times are local (UTC−5)

| 4 August; 15:03 | Sa Andreasen – Se Andreasen (Argentina) | 2–0 | (Mexico) García – Pérez | Villa María del Triunfo Sports Center; Referees: Dardo Ferreira (URU) |
| 4 August; 15:03 | (15–13, 15–8); Report | | | Villa María del Triunfo Sports Center; Referees: Dardo Ferreira (URU) |

| 4 August; 16:33 | Domínguez – Romero (Chile) | 2–1 | (Uruguay) Guichón – Rivas | Villa María del Triunfo Sports Center; Referees: Rolando Casteleiro (CUB) |
| 4 August; 16:33 | (15–10, 10–15, 10–6); Report | | | Villa María del Triunfo Sports Center; Referees: Rolando Casteleiro (CUB) |

| 5 August; 15:02 | (Argentina) Sa Andreasen – Se Andreasen | 2–0 | Domínguez – Romero (Chile) | Villa María del Triunfo Sports Center; Referees: Andrés Caballero (CUB) |
| 5 August; 15:02 | (15–1, 15–12); Report | | | Villa María del Triunfo Sports Center; Referees: Andrés Caballero (CUB) |

| 5 August; 16:09 | (Mexico) García – Pérez | 2–0 | Bellido – Velásquez (Peru) | Villa María del Triunfo Sports Center; Referees: Alfonso Romero (CHI) |
| 5 August; 16:09 | (15–3, 15–6); Report | | | Villa María del Triunfo Sports Center; Referees: Alfonso Romero (CHI) |

| 6 August; 16:48 | (Uruguay) Guichón – Rivas | 0–2 | García – Pérez (Mexico) | Villa María del Triunfo Sports Center; Referees: Jorge Balbi (ARG) |
| 6 August; 16:48 | (5–15, 4–15); Report | | | Villa María del Triunfo Sports Center; Referees: Jorge Balbi (ARG) |

| 6 August; 17:38 | (Peru) Bellido – Velásquez | 0–2 | Sa Andreasen – Se Andreasen (Argentina) | Villa María del Triunfo Sports Center; Referees: Alfonso Romero (CHI) |
| 6 August; 17:38 | (5–15, 6–15); Report | | | Villa María del Triunfo Sports Center; Referees: Alfonso Romero (CHI) |

| 7 August; 17:03 | (Argentina) Sa Andreasen – Se Andreasen | 2–0 | Guichón – Rivas (Uruguay) | Villa María del Triunfo Sports Center; Referees: Rolando Casteleiro (CUB) |
| 7 August; 17:03 | (15–7, 15–2); Report | | | Villa María del Triunfo Sports Center; Referees: Rolando Casteleiro (CUB) |

| 7 August; 17:48 | (Chile) Domínguez – Romero | 2–0 | Bellido – Velásquez (Peru) | Villa María del Triunfo Sports Center; Referees: Leonardo Mondada (URU) |
| 7 August; 17:48 | (15–5, 15–2); Report | | | Villa María del Triunfo Sports Center; Referees: Leonardo Mondada (URU) |

| 8 August; 15:03 | (Mexico) García – Pérez | 2–0 | Domínguez – Romero (Chile) | Villa María del Triunfo Sports Center; Referees: Jorge Balbi (ARG) |
| 8 August; 15:03 | (15–10, 15–12); Report | | | Villa María del Triunfo Sports Center; Referees: Jorge Balbi (ARG) |

| 8 August; 16:28 | (Uruguay) Guichón – Rivas | 2–0 | Bellido – Velásquez (Peru) | Villa María del Triunfo Sports Center; Referees: Alfonso Romero (CHI) |
| 8 August; 16:28 | (15–7, 15–8); Report | | | Villa María del Triunfo Sports Center; Referees: Alfonso Romero (CHI) |

=== Bronze medal match ===
| 9 August; 14:59 | (Chile) Domínguez – Romero | 2–0 | Guichón – Rivas (Uruguay) | Villa María del Triunfo Sports Center; Referees: Jorge Balbi (ARG) |
| 9 August; 14:59 | (15–8, 15–4); Report | | | Villa María del Triunfo Sports Center; Referees: Jorge Balbi (ARG) |

=== Gold medal match ===
| 10 August; 18:03 | (Argentina) Sa Andreasen – Se Andreasen | 2–0 | García – Pérez (Mexico) | Villa María del Triunfo Sports Center |
| 10 August; 18:03 | (15–8, 15–6); Report | | | Villa María del Triunfo Sports Center |
