= Basque pelota at the 2019 Pan American Games – Men's doubles frontenis =

Basque pelota – Men's doubles trinquete rubber ball at the 2019 Pan American Games
- Venue: Villa María del Triunfo Center
- Dates: 4–10 August
- Competitors: 10 from 5 nations

Medalists
Gold medal	Josué López; Luis Molina	Mexico
Silver medal	Omar Espinoza; Salvador Espinoza	United States
Bronze medal	Jorge Alberdi; Guillermo Osorio	Argentina

The men's doubles frontenis basque pelota event at the 2019 Pan American Games was held from 4–10 August at the Basque pelota courts in the Villa María del Triunfo Sports Center in Lima, Peru. The Mexican team won the gold medal, after defeating the United States in the final.

== Results ==
=== Preliminary round ===
The preliminary stage consisted of a single round robin group where every doubles team played each other once. At the end of this stage, the first two teams then played a final match for the gold medal, while the third and fourth played for bronze.

Pos	Team	Pld	W	L	PF	PA	PD	Pts
1	Mexico Josué López Luis Molina	4	4	0	120	60	+60	12
2	United States Omar Espinoza Salvador Espinoza	4	3	1	108	71	+37	10
3	Argentina Jorge Alberdi Guillermo Osorio	4	2	2	90	91	−1	8
4	Chile Jesús García Toro Julián González	4	1	3	76	121	−45	6
5	Peru Juan Bezada David Yupanqui	4	0	4	76	127	−51	4

Updated to match(es) played on 10 August 2019. Source: Lima 2019

All times are local (UTC−5)

4 August; 8:56	López – Molina (Mexico)	2–0	(United States) O Espinoza – S Espinoza	Villa María del Triunfo Sports Center; Referees: Roberto Jara (CHI), Alfonso Romero (CHI)
4 August; 8:56	(15–13, 15–5); Report			Villa María del Triunfo Sports Center; Referees: Roberto Jara (CHI), Alfonso Romero (CHI)

4 August; 10:28	Alberdi – Osorio (Argentina)	2–0	(Chile) García Toro – González	Villa María del Triunfo Sports Center; Referees: Pedro López (MEX), Andrés Caballero (CUB)
4 August; 10:28	(15–3, 15–7); Report			Villa María del Triunfo Sports Center; Referees: Pedro López (MEX), Andrés Caballero (CUB)

5 August; 10:53	(Mexico) López – Molina	2–0	Alberdi – Osorio (Argentina)	Villa María del Triunfo Sports Center; Referees: Roberto Jara (CHI), Alejandro Varela (URU)
5 August; 10:53	(15–6, 15–7); Report			Villa María del Triunfo Sports Center; Referees: Roberto Jara (CHI), Alejandro Varela (URU)

5 August; 11:50	(United States) O Espinoza – S Espinoza	2–0	Bezada – Yupanqui (Peru)	Villa María del Triunfo Sports Center; Referees: Dardo Ferreira (URU), Luis Sánchez Castillo (PER)
5 August; 11:50	(15–5, 15–7); Report			Villa María del Triunfo Sports Center; Referees: Dardo Ferreira (URU), Luis Sánchez Castillo (PER)

6 August; 9:01	(Chile) García Toro – González	0–2	O Espinoza – S Espinoza (United States)	Villa María del Triunfo Sports Center; Referees: Pedro López (MEX), Jorge Carpio León (PER)
6 August; 9:01	(7–15, 5–15); Report			Villa María del Triunfo Sports Center; Referees: Pedro López (MEX), Jorge Carpio León (PER)

6 August; 10:11	(Peru) Bezada – Yupanqui	0–2	López – Molina (Mexico)	Villa María del Triunfo Sports Center; Referees: Leonardo Mondada (URU), Luis Alberto Sánchez (PER)
6 August; 10:11	(6–15, 6–15); Report			Villa María del Triunfo Sports Center; Referees: Leonardo Mondada (URU), Luis Alberto Sánchez (PER)

7 August; 9:00	(Mexico) López – Molina	2–0	García Toro – González (Chile)	Villa María del Triunfo Sports Center; Referees: Jorge Balbi (ARG), Vladimir Torres (PER)
7 August; 9:00	(15–9, 15–8); Report			Villa María del Triunfo Sports Center; Referees: Jorge Balbi (ARG), Vladimir Torres (PER)

7 August; 10:00	(Argentina) Alberdi – Osorio	2–0	Bezada – Yupanqui (Peru)	Villa María del Triunfo Sports Center; Referees: Roberto Jara (CHI), Luis Alberto Sánchez (PER)
7 August; 10:00	(15–8, 15–13); Report			Villa María del Triunfo Sports Center; Referees: Roberto Jara (CHI), Luis Alberto Sánchez (PER)

8 August; 9:01	(United States) O Espinoza – S Espinoza	2–0	Alberdi – Osorio (Argentina)	Villa María del Triunfo Sports Center; Referees: Roberto Jara (CHI), Henning Barrantes (PER)
8 August; 9:01	(15–10, 15–7); Report			Villa María del Triunfo Sports Center; Referees: Roberto Jara (CHI), Henning Barrantes (PER)

8 August; 10:42	(Chile) García Toro – González	2–1	Bezada – Yupanqui (Peru)	Villa María del Triunfo Sports Center; Referees: Alfonso Romero (CHI)
8 August; 10:42	(15–8, 12–15, 10–8); Report			Villa María del Triunfo Sports Center; Referees: Alfonso Romero (CHI)

=== Bronze medal match ===
9 August; 10:16	(Argentina) Alberdi – Osorio	2–0	García Toro – González (Chile)	Villa María del Triunfo Sports Center; Referees: Pedro López (MEX), Vladimir Torres (PER)
9 August; 10:16	(15–6, 15–8); Report			Villa María del Triunfo Sports Center; Referees: Pedro López (MEX), Vladimir Torres (PER)

=== Gold medal match ===
10 August; 9:58	(Mexico) López – Molina	2–0	O Espinoza – S Espinoza (United States)	Villa María del Triunfo Sports Center; Referees: Roberto Jara (CHI), Vladimir Torres (PER)
10 August; 9:58	(15–8, 15–10); Report			Villa María del Triunfo Sports Center; Referees: Roberto Jara (CHI), Vladimir Torres (PER)
