= Ana Galindo (gymnast) =

Mexican rhythmic gymnast

- Born: 18 September 2003 (age 22) Nayarit, Mexico

Gymnastics career
- Country represented: Mexico
Medal record
Pan American Games
Gold medal – first place	2019 Lima	Group all-around
Gold medal – first place	2019 Lima	5 balls
Silver medal – second place	2019 Lima	3 hoops + 2 clubs

Ana Galindo (born 18 September 2003) is a Mexican rhythmic gymnast.

Galindo competed at the 2019 Pan American Games where she won gold medals in the group all-around and 5 balls events and a silver medal in the 3 hoops + 2 clubs event.
