= Eugenio Garza =

Mexican equestrian (born 1996)

Personal information
- Full name: Eugenio Garza Pérez
- Discipline: Show jumping
- Born: 23 July 1996 (age 30); Monterrey, Mexico
Medal record
Equestrian
Representing Mexico
Pan American Games
Silver medal – second place	2019 Lima	Team jumping

Wife: Belen Campana Eugenio Garza Pérez (Note: In this Spanish name, the first or paternal surname is Garza and the second or maternal family name is Pérez.) (born 23 July 1996) is a Mexican equestrian. He competed in the individual jumping and team jumping events at the 2020 Summer Olympics. Garza also competed in the same events at the 2024 Summer Olympics, and in team jumping at the 2019 Pan American Games and 2023 Pan American Games.
