= Juan Carlos Ruíz =

Bolivian footballer (born 1968)

Personal information
- Date of birth: 14 August 1968 (age 58)
- Place of birth: Santa Cruz de la Sierra, Bolivia

International career
Years	Team	Apps	(Gls)
1995–1996	Bolivia	5	(0)

Juan Carlos Ruíz (born 14 August 1968) is a Bolivian footballer. He played in five matches for the Bolivia national football team from 1995 to 1996. He was also part of Bolivia's squad for the 1995 Copa América tournament.
