= Patricio Pasquel =

Mexican equestrian

Personal information
- Full name: Patricio Pasquel Quintana
- Born: 16 March 1972 (age 54) Mexico City, Mexico
- Height: 188 cm (6 ft 2 in)

Sport
- Country: Mexico
- Sport: Equestrian
- Event: Show jumping
Medal record
Equestrian
Representing Mexico
Pan American Games
Silver medal – second place	2019 Lima	Team jumping

Patricio Pasquel Quintana (Note: In this Spanish name, the first or paternal surname is Pasquel and the second or maternal family name is Quintana.) (born 16 March 1972) is a Mexican equestrian. He competed in the 2020 Summer Olympics in the team jumping event.
