= List of German Argentines =

German Argentines (in Spanish referred as germano argentinos) are made up of Argentines of German descent, as well as Germans who became Argentine citizens.

Please, note that ethnic Germans not only lived within the German borders of their time, but there were many communities of ethnic Germans living in other parts of Europe, especially before WWII. The German language and culture have traditionally been more important than the country of origin, as the basis of the ethnic and national consciousness of the Germans (Germany as a political entity was founded as late as 1871). Therefore, the political places from which these people or their ascendants emigrated to Argentina may vary. For example, Volga Germans arrived from the Russian Empire, most of Danube Swabians did it from the Austro-Hungarian Empire (today Hungary, Romania, etc.), etc. Likewise, there are multi-ethnic European states such as Switzerland, which has a German Swiss population with their own German language, while French and Italian-speaking citizens inhabit other regions of the country, retaining their differences even today. Austrians, on the other hand, were historically regarded as ethnic Germans and viewed themselves as such. As can be seen, the large population of German ethnicity occupied an area of several present-day countries. Citizenship is the mere legal condition of belonging to one state or another, while nationality or ethnicity is related to anthropological and sociological aspects and thus has an extraterritorial character.

The following is a non-exhaustive list of some notable German Argentines. In it, German surnames abound. However, an amount several times this number is estimated for notable Argentines of partial German descent who do not have German surnames.

== Academia ==
- Hans Altglet (prominent architect)
- Marcella Althaus-Reid (professor of contextual theology and writer)
- María Teresa A. Waldmeyer (engineer, the first electronic engineer at the National University of Tucumán, Argentina, and the first woman professor in the field of Telecommunications Engineering at the Polytechnic University of Madrid, Spain)
- Eugenio Bachmann (scientist)
- Carlos Berg (scientist)
- Efraín Bischoff (historian)
- Guillermo Bodenbender (scientist)
- Osvaldo Boelcke (scientist)
- Emil Bose (scientist)
- Ludwig Brackebusch (scientist)
- Francisco Bullrich (architect)
- Carlos Octavio Bunge (sociologist, pedagogue and historian)
- Mario Bunge (scientist)
- Arturo Eduardo Burkart (scientist)
- Hermann Burmeister (scientist)
- Adolfo Büttner (engineer, architect)
- Claro Cornelio Dassen (mathematician)
- Adolfo Döring (scientist)
- Oscar Döring (scientist)
- Carlos Fader (engineer, some Argentine schools honor his name)
- Gustavo Fester (scientist)
- Emilio Frers (educator)
- Germán Frers (naval architect)
- Franz Stephan Griese (philologist)
- Pablo Groeber (scientist)
- Johannes Franz Hartmann (astronomer)
- Gabriela Hässel de Menéndez (scientist)
- Eduardo Ladislao Holmberg (undertook the inventory of Argentine flora and fauna)
- Kurt Hueck (scientist)
- Christofredo Jakob (scientist)
- Roberto Kiesling (scientist)
- Augusto Klappenbach (philosopher)
- Alejandro Korn (physician, philosopher and reformist)
- Otto Krause (engineer, founded the first Technical School in Argentina in 1899)
- Johannes Kronfuss (architect, he made the first extensive survey of all Spanish colonial architecture in Argentina)
- Franz Kühn (scientist)
- Oscar Kühnemann (scientist)
- Federico Kurtz (scientist)
- Rodolfo Kusch (philosopher, pro Native Americans activist)
- Paul Günther Lorentz (scientist)
- Rolf Mantel (economist)
- Ernesto Meyer (architect)
- Teodore Meyer (scientist, he discovered Tabebuia/Lapacho properties)
- Fernando Moog (architect)
- Gustavo Niederlein (scientist)
- Anastasius Nordenholz (writer and scientist)
- Carlos Nordmann (architect)
- Alberto Prebisch (architect)
- Raúl Prebisch (the most notorious economist of Latin America, he formed the basis of economic dependency theory with the Singer-Prebisch thesis)
- Josep Heinrich Theodor Rauch (engineer, architect, pioneer)
- Carlos Segers (astronomer)
- Werner Schad (linguistic scientist and educator)
- Friedrich Schickendantz (scientist)
- Walter Schiller (scientist)
- Otto Schneider (scientist)
- Augusto Gustavo Schulz (scientist)
- Hans Schumacher (physicist and chemist)
- Felipe Schwarz (architect)
- Marta Teodora Schwarz (medicine woman)
- Carlos Segers (astronomer)
- Rodrigo Bustos Singer (botanist)
- Otto Thomas Solbrig (biologist, botanist)
- Baldomero Sommer (founder of Sociedad Dermatológica Argentina)
- Alfred Wilhelm Stelzner (geologist)
- Adolph Strümpell (scientist)
- Teodoro Juan Vicente Stuckert (botanist)
- Kurt Tank (scientist, he designed FMA IAe 33 Pulqui II in Argentina)
- Max Tepp (scientist)
- Wolfgang Volkheimer (scientist)
- Otto von Arnim (architect)
- Arturo von Seelstrang (engineer)
- Ricardo Wichmann (scientist)
- Anselmo Windhausen (scientist)
- Kurt Wölcken (scientist)

== Arts and literature ==
- Roberto Arlt (short-story writer, novelist and playwright)
- Osvaldo Bayer (writer)
- Elsa Bornemann (one of the best writers of children's literature in Latin America)
- Silvina Bullrich (writer)
- Delfina Bunge (writer)
- Domingo Fernández Beschtedt (alias Fernán Félix de Amador, poet, art critic)
- Helmut Ditsch (Hyperrealism painter)
- Fernando Fader (painter)
- Jorge Fondebrider (writer, poet)
- Juan Pedro Franze (composer and musicologist)
- Elizabeth Eichhorn (artist)
- Michael Gielen (conductor and composer)
- Hermann Federico Arturo Hassel (writer)
- Liliana Heer (psychoanalyst, writer)
- Annemarie Heinrich (prominent photographer)
- Paola Kaufmann (writer)
- Eduardo Gudiño Kieffer (writer)
- María Cristina Kiehr (soprano)
- Federico Klemm (art critic)
- Bertha Kösler Ilg (writer)
- Manfredo Kraemer (violinist)
- Francisco Kröpfl (composer, music theorist)
- Erwin Leuchter (musicologist, conductor)
- Carlos Alberto Leumann (poet)
- Bernardo Neumann (artist)
- Alan Pauls (writer)
- Guillermo Pfening (actor)
- Silvia Roederer (pianist)
- Eric Schierloh (writer)
- Carlos Schlieper (director)
- Luis Mario Schneider (writer, poet)
- Renate Schottelius (dancer, choreographer)
- Xul Solar (Oscar Schulz, painter)
- Sebastian Spreng (visual artist, music journalist)
- Daniela Taberning (soprano)
- Carlos Veerhoff (composer)
- Carlos Vogt (cartoonist)
- Úrsula von der Lippen (artist)
- Otto von Klickx (writer)
- María Wernicke (writer)
- Rodolfo Zagert (painter, architect)
- Margarita Zimmermann (singer)

== Business ==
- Guillermo Bauer (manager, owner of the first steam-operated flour mill in Argentina)
- Carlos Miguens Bemberg (one of the Latin America's most Important Businessmen and descendant of the wealthy Bemberg family)
- Otto Bemberg (founder of the Brand of beer Quilmes, the biggest one in the country)
- Carlos Miguens Bemberg (one of the Latin America's most Important Businessmen and descendant of the wealthy Bemberg family)
- Francis Mallmann (one of the best Latin America's chefs, and prominent manager)
- Roberto Mertig (founder of Orbis Mertig)
- Alberto Roemmers (founder of Laboratorios Roemmers, the most important Latin American Pharmaceutical Laboratory)
- Juan Rosauer (founder of Los Alamos de Rosauer SA)
- Otto Schneider (founder of the brand of beer Schneider)
- Enrique Wollmann (former owner of the first export sugar exploitation company in Argentina run by his descendants)

== Diplomacy ==
- Carlos Keller (ambassador)
- Juan Carlos Kreckler (ambassador)
- Luis María Kreckler (ambassador)

== Entertainment ==
- Facundo Arana (mother: von Bernard) (actor)
- Edmundo Arrocet (mother: von Lhose) (humorist)
- Christian Bach (actress and producer of telenovelas)
- María Luisa Bemberg (film writer, director and actress)
- Lucho Bender (actor)
- Eduardo Bergara Leumann (actor)
- Betiana Blum (actress)
- Inés Braun (cinematographer)
- Cachorro López (Gerardo López von Linden) (record producer, musician, songwriter)
- Julio Chávez (surname: Hirsch) (actor)
- Sergio Denis (singer, songwriter)
- Pancho Dotto (mother: Melinger) (founder and owner of the most emblematic fashion model agency in Argentina)
- Arturo Goetz (actor)
- Guillermo Helbling (actor)
- Javier Herrlein (former drummer of Catupecu Machu)
- Carlos Kaspar (actor)
- Natalí Kessler (Big Brother, season 6)
- Regina Lamm (actress)
- Danilo Moschen (drummer of Rata Blanca)
- Diego Olivera (mother: Walter) (actor)
- Gastón Pauls (actor, TV host)
- Pipo Pescador (Enrique Fischer, humourist, actor)
- Gerónimo Rauch (singer)
- Axel Reigenborn (Big Brother, season 7)
- Silvina Scheffler (Big Brother, season 4)
- Jazmín Schmidt (Big Brother, season 2)
- Eduardo Schmidt (former first singer of Árbol rock band)
- Sebastian Schneider (singer)
- Jorge Schubert (actor)
- Matías Schrank (Big Brother, season 8)
- Santiago Stieben (actor)
- René Strickler (actor)
- Guido Süller (actor)
- Silvia Süller (humorist)
- Erika Wallner (actress)
- Natalie Weber (actress)
- Alejandro Wiebe (TV host)
- Ricardo Yost (musician)

== Fashion models ==
- Annie Fink (model, actress)
- Carla Gebhart (model)
- Antonella Graef (model)
- Ingrid Grudke (model, TV host)
- Mario Guerci (mother: Hofer) (model)
- Ivana Kislinger (Miss Argentina)
- Erika Mitdank (model)
- Geraldine Neumann (model)
- Karen Reichardt (model, actress)
- Julia Rohden (model)
- Nicole Neumann (model, TV host)
- Evelyn Scheidl (ex model, Miss Argentina, TV host)
- Milagros Schmoll (model)
- Paulina Trotz (model)

== Historical figures ==
- Hans Barge (he was probably the first German who arrived to Argentina, as gunner during Magellan's expedition of 1520)
- Virginia Bolten (anarchist and feminist)
- Jorge Bunge (founder of Pinamar)
- Tamara Bunke (communist revolutionary)
- Richard Walther Darré (one of the ideologist of Blood and soil)
- Carlos Gesell (founder of the city of Villa Gesell, beach resort in Buenos Aires Province)
- Teodoro Lange (founder of Begolea, a town in Cordoba Province)
- Guillermo Lehmann (pioneer)
- Dietrich Meyer (he founded Sierra de La Ventana with German settlers)
- Gunther Plüschow (aviator, he was the first to explore and film Tierra del Fuego and Patagonia by air; honoured as a hero by the Argentine air force to this day. His paternal grandfather was an illegitimate son of Frederick Louis, Hereditary Grand Duke of Mecklenburg-Schwerin).
- Alberto Prebisch (architect, he designed the Obelisk of Buenos Aires among others)
- Federico Rauch (Argentine Army colonel in the early 19th century)
- Omar Alberto Rupp (the only Argentine crew member killed as a result of the bombing of the Argentine fishing trawler ARA Narwal by the British Sea Harriers from HMS Hermes on 9 May 1982, during Falklands War).
- Ulrich Schmidl (he was the chronicler of the first Foundation of Buenos Aires)
- Francisco Seeber (military officer, businessman and ex mayor of Buenos Aires)
- Ernesto Tornquist (prominent manager, he founded the Tornquist Bank and Tornquist city among many other contributions)
- Carlos von der Becke (military leader)
- Teodoro Waldner (Argentine Air Force brigadier during Falklands War)
- Carlos Wiederhold (a pioneer, he founded the famous city of San Carlos de Bariloche in 1895)
- Kurt Gustav Wilckens (famous anarchist revolutionary)

== Journalism ==
- Jorge Bullrich (sports journalist)
- Alejandro Klappenbach (sport journalist)
- Andrés Klipphan (journalist)
- Gustavo Kuffner (sport journalist)
- Sebastian Spreng (journalist)

== Nobility ==
- Eugenia de Chikoff (German mother from Alsace) (countess)
- Fernando Fader (mother: viscountess Celia de Bonneval)
- Cecilia Kinsky von dem Busche-Haddenhausen (countess)
- Leonor Martínez de Hoz Stegmann (lady, she was of partial German descent and married German Baron Karl von dem Busche-Haddenhausen)
- Hans Ernst von dem Bussche-Haddenhausen (baron)
- Matilde von dem Busche-Haddenhausen (princess, she married Ulrich, 10th Prince Kinsky of Wchinitz and Tettau)
- Mercedes von Dietrichstein (princess)
- Ena von Wenckheim (countess)

== Politics ==
- Luis Alberto Ammann (politician, writer)
- Silvia Augsburger (socialist politician)
- Hermes Binner (political leader and ex-governor of Santa Fe Province)
- Cristian Breitenstein (ex-mayor of Bahía Blanca)
- Adolfo Bullrich (ex-mayor of Buenos Aires)
- Esteban Bullrich (politician)
- Patricia Bullrich (Minister of Security of Argentina)
- Maurice Closs (ex-governor of Misiones Province)
- Eduardo Fellner (ex-governor of Jujuy Province)
- Liliana Fellner (senator)
- Cristina Fernández de Kirchner (mother: Wilhelm) (ex-president of Argentina)
- Gustavo Hein (politician)
- Néstor Kirchner (ex-president of Argentina)
- Daniel Kroneberger (politician)
- Lucila Lehmann (politician)
- Rodolfo Lehmann (ex-governor of Santa Fe Province)
- Edelmiro Mayer (ex-governor of Santa Cruz Province)
- Rogelio Pfirter (ambassador)
- Alberto Prebisch (ex-mayor of Buenos Aires)
- Carlos Reutemann (former Formula One racing driver and politician)
- Cornelia Schmidt-Liermann (politician)
- Francisco Seeber (military officer, businessman and ex mayor of Buenos Aires)
- Enrique Spangenberg (politician, he denounced Human Rights violations during the last dictatorship)
- Pablo Tschirsch (ex-vice governor of Misiones Province)
- Ernesto Ueltschi (ex-governor of Mendoza Province)
- Jorge Federico Von Stecher (military officer and ambassador)
- Rodolfo A. Weidmann (politician)

== Religion ==
=== Roman Catholic bishops ===
- Víctor Ahrenhardt, bishop of Oberá
- Pedro Boxler, bishop emeritus of Gualeguaychú
- Luis Guillermo Eichhorn, bishop of Morón
- Ricardo Oscar Faifer, bishop of Goya
- Adolfo Gerstner, bishop emeritus of Concordia
- Jorge Gottau, bishop of Añatuya, creator of "Colecta Más por Menos"
- José Luis Kaufmann, archbishop of La Plata
- Aurelio José Kühn Hergenreder, bishop, prelate of Deán Funes
- Jorge Kemerer, bishop emeritus of Posadas
- Jorge Mayer, archbishop emeritus of the Archdiocese of Bahía Blanca
- Enrique José Mühn, bishop emeritus of Jujuy
- Jorge Novak, bishop of Quilmes, founder of "Movimiento Ecuménico por los Derechos Humanos"
- Enrique Rau, bishop of Mar del Plata, well known for his humanitarian labour
- Ricardo Rösch, bishop of Concordia
- Jorge Eduardo Scheinig, archbishop of Mercedes-Luján
- Alejandro Schell, bishop of Lomas de Zamora
- Luis Stöckler, bishop of Quilmes
- Eduardo María Taussig, bishop of San Rafael
- Jorge Luis Wagner, auxiliary bishop of Bahía Blanca
- José Weimann, bishop of Santiago del Estero
- Bernardo Enrique Witte, bishop emeritus of Concepción
- Gustavo Zurbriggen, bishop of Deán Funes

=== Roman Catholic deacons ===
- Guillermo Feldmann (deacon)
- Günther Federico Freybler (deacon)
- José Ignacio Ebherardt (deacon)
- Gerardo Eggel (deacon)
- Dario Kemerer (deacon)
- Eugenio Langer (deacon)
- Luis Ángel Mayer (deacon)
- Carlos Félix Stadler (deacon)
- Edgarde Gabriel Tisch (deacon)
- Antonio Jorge Werner (deacon)
- Daniel Ramón Williner (deacon)

=== Roman Catholic presbyteries ===
- José Bahl (presbytery)
- José Brendel (presbytery)
- Alejandro Bunge (presbytery)
- Jorge Burgardt (presbytery)
- Alfonso Gabriel Dittler (presbytery)
- Alejandro Durban (presbytery, Domestic Prelate)
- Enrique Engler (presbytery)
- Alejandro Fann (presbytery)
- Alfonso Vicente Frank (presbytery)
- Juan Frank (presbytery)
- Marcelo Frank (presbytery)
- Rene Fritz (presbytery)
- Arturo Fuhr (presbytery)
- José Gallinger (presbytery)
- Alfonso Gerling (presbytery)
- Hilario Gottfrit (presbytery)
- Sergio Ramón Götte (presbytery)
- Mario Alberto Haller (presbytery)
- Elías Heinrich (presbytery)
- Fernando Heinzen (presbytery)
- Miguel Ángel Heit (presbytery)
- David Hergenreder (presbytery)
- Máximo Hergenreder (presbytery)
- Héctor Carlos Herlein (presbytery)
- Norberto Hertel (presbytery)
- Gustavo Horisberger (presbytery)
- Eduardo Jacob (presbytery)
- Luis Jacob (presbytery)
- Sergio Jacob (presbytery)
- Agustín Kaul (presbytery)
- Silverio Klaus (presbytery)
- Emilio Klehr (presbytery)
- Jorge Kloster (presbytery)
- Matías Kloster (presbytery)
- Andrés Koenig (presbytery)
- Arsenio Koenig (presbytery)
- Néstor Kranevitter (presbytery)
- Santiago Kunz (presbytery)
- Antonio Lange (presbytery)
- Pedro Leonhardt (presbytery)
- Javier Ricardo Margheim (presbytery)
- Ricardo Lorenzo Martensen (presbytery)
- Miguel Ostertag (presbytery)
- Diego Ariel Rausch (presbytery)
- Guillermo Rausch (presbytery)
- Luis Reim (presbytery)
- Ángel Riedel (presbytery)
- Omar Rohrmann (presbytery)
- Ovidio Roskopf (presbytery)
- César Jesús Schmidt (presbytery)
- Rubén Schmidt (presbytery)
- Jorge Schoeffer (presbytery, Prelate of Honour of His Holiness)
- Marcos Schneider (presbytery)
- Sergio Andrés Schwindt (presbytery)
- Raúl Antonio Spahn (presbytery)
- Eduardo Tanger (presbytery)
- Antonio Ulrich (presbytery)
- Francisco Ulrich (presbytery)
- Carlos Luis Wagenführer (presbytery)
- Jorge Wagner (presbytery)
- Marcos Weinzettel (presbytery)
- Leonardo Yacob (presbytery)
- César Zingerling (presbytery)
- Víctor P. Zorn (presbytery)

=== Roman Catholic priests ===
- Manuel Bahl (priest)
- Mariano Baimler (priest)
- Alejandro Baumann (priest)
- Narciso Baumgratz (priest)
- Antonio Becker (priest)
- Alfonso Berger (priest)
- Antonio Blöhsel (priest)
- Juan José Boxler (priest)
- Rodrigo Brunner (priest)
- Ángel Duckart (priest)
- Martín Dumrauf (priest)
- Reinaldo Dumrauf (priest)
- Román Dumrauf (priest)
- José Engemann (priest)
- Rolando Otto Ernst (priest)
- Alejandro Fahn (priest)
- Luis Freiberger (priest)
- Julio Freitag (priest)
- Silvestre Fischer (priest)
- Arturo Fuhr (priest)
- Horacio Fuhr (priest)
- Victoriano Fuhr Stössel (priest)
- José Gallinger (priest)
- Agustín Gasmann (priest)
- José Gatdner (priest)
- Hilario Gottfriedt (priest)
- Raúl Rodolfo Gross (priest)
- Guillermo Hafner (priest)
- Viro Hanauer (priest)
- José Haub (priest)
- Elías Heinrich (priest)
- Romano Hentz (priest)
- Carlos Hermann (priest)
- Miguel Ángel Hippermayer (priest)
- José Kaufmann (priest)
- José Keiner (priest)
- Diego Kessler (priest)
- Alberto Klein (priest)
- Luis Kloster (priest)
- Matías Kloster (priest)
- Carlos Kober (priest)
- Arsenio König (priest)
- Jorge Koenig (priest)
- Luis Kreder (priest)
- Miguel Krüger (priest)
- Héctor Raúl Läderach (priest)
- Horacio Lambrecht (priest)
- Antonio Lange (priest)
- Pablo Lell (priest)
- Pedro Leonhartd (priest)
- Franco Alberto Lütens (priest)
- Federico Mayer (priest)
- José María Masson (priest)
- Daniel Melchior (priest)
- Vicente Melchior (priest)
- Osvaldo Metz (priest)
- José Neuenhöfer (priest)
- Miguel Ostertag (priest)
- Jorge Prediger (priest)
- Luis Rodecker (priest)
- Alejandro Ruppel (priest)
- José Ruppel (priest)
- Eduardo Schang (priest)
- Werner Scheidl (priest)
- Juan Schmidt (priest)
- Luis Schönfeldt (priest)
- Isidoro Schuap (priest)
- Francisco Senfter (priest)
- Andrés Senger (priest)
- Diego Sieburger (priest)
- Carlos Francisco Stadler (priest)
- Ricardo Stegelmann (priest)
- Christian Stranz (priest)
- Juan Straubinger (priest and professor at National University of La Plata, he translated the first Bible in Argentina)
- Albisio Strieder (priest)
- Francisco Vogel (priest)
- Tomás Francisco von Schulz (priest)
- Carlos Wagenführer (priest)
- Jorge Wagner (priest)
- Teodoro Waller (priest)
- Ariel Hernán Weimann (priest)
- Héctor Weller (priest)
- Clemente Widenhorn (priest)
- Otto Wiedemann (priest)
- Gregorio Zitzmann (priest)

=== Others ===
- Sofía Bunge (nun, founder of a nuns' order)
- Osvaldo Gross (pâtissier, TV host)
- Guillermo Hemmerling (radio host)
- Jakob Riffel (evangelical pastor, researcher on the Volga Germans of Argentina)
- Fabián Schunk (ex-priest, he left the priesthood after denouncing the pederast priest Justo Ilarraz)
- Bernarda Seitz (nun, TV host)
- José Carlos Wendler (ex-priest, he left the priesthood in rejection of the position of the Catholic Church, which refused to criminally denounce the pederast priest Justo Ilarraz)

== Sports ==
=== Alpine skiing ===
- Carolina Birkner (Olympic alpine skier)
- Ignacio Birkner (Olympic alpine skier)
- Jorge Birkner (Olympic alpine skier)
- Jorge Birkner Ketelhohn (Olympic alpine skier)
- Magdalena Birkner (Olympic alpine skier)
- Fernando Enevoldsen (alpine skier)
- Otto Jung (Olympic alpine skier)
- Ricardo Klenk (Olympic alpine skier)
- Ana Sabine Naumann (Olympic alpine skier)
- Carlos Perner (Olympic alpine skier)
- Diego Schweizer (Olympic alpine skier)
- María Cristina Schweizer (Olympic alpine skier)
- Cristian Javier Simari Birkner (Olympic alpine skier)
- Macarena Simari Birkner (Olympic alpine skier)
- Maria Belén Simari Birkner (Olympic alpine skier)
- Roberto Thostrup (Olympic alpine skier)

=== Athletics ===
- Silvia Augsburger (Olympic athlete, politician)
- Nicolás Baumann (Olympic athlete)
- Anita Bärwirth (Olympic athlete)
- Alberto Becher (Olympic athlete)
- Edith Berg (Olympic athlete)
- Alberto Biedermann (Olympic athlete)
- Gerardo Bönnhoff (Olympic athlete)
- Ernesto Braun (Olympic athlete)
- Ada Brener (Olympic athlete)
- Timoteo Buckwalter (Olympic athlete)
- Jennifer Dahlgren (Olympic athlete)
- Otto Dietsch (Olympic athlete)
- Sofía Dreyer (Olympic athlete)
- Marcelo Ducart (Olympic athlete)
- María Emilia Eberhardt (Olympic athlete)
- Irene Fitzner (Olympic athlete)
- Aníbal Folmer (Olympic athlete)
- Raúl Folmer (Olympic athlete)
- Ilse Hammerl (Olympic athlete)
- Claudia Hahn (Olympic athlete)
- Gustavo Heger (Olympic athlete)
- Lilian Heinz (Olympic athlete)
- Enrique Helf (Olympic athlete)
- Claudio Henschke (Olympic athlete)
- Natalia Hinsch (Olympic athlete)
- Santiago Hintse (Olympic athlete)
- Carlos Hofmeister (Olympic athlete)
- Ángel Holman (Olympic athlete)
- Elena Junges (Olympic athlete)
- Juan Kahnert (Olympic athlete)
- Enrique Kistenmacher (Olympic athlete)
- Federico Kleger (Olympic athlete)
- Marcelo Knauss (Olympic athlete)
- Alberto Kraeft (Olympic athlete)
- Carlos Kreuz (Olympic athlete)
- Susana Krumenaker (Olympic athlete)
- Günther Kruse (Olympic athlete)
- Aníbal Lanz (Olympic athlete)
- Ricardo Martens (Olympic athlete)
- Carina Müller (Olympic athlete)
- Yvonne Neddermann (Olympic athlete)
- Gisela Pfeiffer (Olympic athlete)
- Ingeborg Pfüller (Olympic track and field athlete)
- Roxana Preussler (Olympic athlete)
- Claudio Reinke (Olympic athlete)
- Pablo Riesen (Olympic athlete)
- Sergio Roh (Olympic athlete)
- Emerson Roth (Olympic athlete)
- Rolando Satler (Olympic athlete)
- Roberto Schaefer (Olympic athlete)
- Carolina Schlossberg (Olympic athlete)
- María Schutz (Olympic athlete)
- Christa Sommersguter (Olympic athlete)
- Luis Spahn (Olympic athlete)
- Laura Spelmeyer (Olympic athlete)
- Carlos Springer (Olympic athlete)
- Lelia Spuhr (Olympic athlete)
- Roberto Stahringer (Olympic athlete)
- Tito Steiner (decathlete, set the national record)
- Roberto Steinmetz (Olympic athlete)
- Juan Stocker (Olympic athlete)
- Carlos Stricker (Olympic athlete)
- Daiana Sturtz (Olympic athlete)
- Anabella von Kesselstatt (Olympic athlete)
- Martín Voss (Olympic athlete)
- Jorge Wagner (Olympic athlete)
- Horst Walter (Olympic athlete)
- Enrique Wirth (Olympic athlete)
- Alfredo Wismer (Olympic athlete)
- Patricia Weber (Olympic athlete)
- Guillermo Weller (Olympic athlete)

=== Basketball ===
- Lucas Arn (basketball player)
- Lisandro Beck (basketball player)
- Germán Bernhardt (basketball player)
- Germán Claus (basketball player)
- Lautaro Dargoltz (basketball player)
- Gabriel Deck (basketball player)
- Tomás Dell (basketball player)
- Cristian Diesel (basketball player)
- Alexis Elsener (basketball player)
- Leandro Fogel (basketball player)
- Ernesto Gehrmann (basketball player)
- Rodrigo Gerhardt (basketball player)
- Melisa Gretter (basketball player)
- Ramiro Heinrich (basketball player)
- Oscar Heis (basketball player)
- Pablo Heit (basketball player)
- Wálter Herrmann (basketball player)
- Cristian Hillebrand (basketball player)
- Daniel Hure (basketball player)
- Gustavo Imsandt (basketball player)
- Federico Kammerichs (basketball payer)
- Agustín Kreiber (basketball player)
- Iván Krenz (basketball player)
- César Leuenberger (basketball player)
- Carlos Lutringer (basketball player)
- Nicolás Mayer (basketball player)
- Ernesto Michel (basketball player)
- Martín Miner (basketball player)
- Hernán Montenegro (mother: Koch) (basketball player)
- Jerónimo Muller (basketball player)
- Martín Müller (basketball player)
- Damián Paulig (basketball player)
- Luciano Polak (basketball player)
- Homero Rasch (basketball player)
- Matías Ruger (basketball player)
- Leonel Schattmann (basketball player)
- Adolfo Scheines (basketball player)
- Juan Schmidt (basketball player)
- Matías Schoffen (basketball player)
- Guillermo Scholtis (basketball player)
- Cristian Schoppler (basketball player)
- Claudio Sollberg (basketball player)
- Antonio Volken (basketball player)
- Matías von Schmeling (basketball player)
- Pablo Walter (basketball player)
- Axel Weigand (basketball player)
- Eugenio Wiemann (basketball player)
- Emilio Ziegler (basketball player)

=== Boxing ===
- Yésica Bopp (boxer)
- Jorge Sebastian Heiland (boxer)
- Rafael Lang (boxer)

=== Cycling ===
- Carlos Ackermann (cyclist)
- Alejandro Bauer (cyclist)
- Daniel Bauer (cyclist)
- Exequiel Bauer (cyclist)
- Verena Brunner (cyclist)
- Germán Dorhmann (cyclist)
- Facundo Dumerauf (cyclist)
- Bárbara Frisch (cyclist)
- Elvio Leonel Gassmann (cyclist)
- Silvia Groch (cyclist)
- Lucio Kaiser (cyclist)
- David Kenig (cyclist)
- Juan Kiffer (cyclist)
- Matías Klein (cyclist)
- Javier Lindner (cyclist)
- Mauricio Muller (cyclist)
- Valeria Müller (cyclist)
- Juan Pablo Raffler (cyclist)
- Agustina Roth (cyclist)
- Ezequiel Sack (cyclist)
- Claudia Schaab (cyclist)
- Juan Manuel Schonberger (cyclist)
- Manuel Schonfeld (cyclist)
- Mario José Schreiner (cyclist)
- Pablo Seewald (cyclist)
- Antonella Senger (cyclist)
- Ernesto Serger (cyclist)
- Sergio Strack (cyclist)
- Germán Trautner (cyclist)
- Juan Tschieder (cyclist)
- Carlos Unkrodt (cyclist)
- Guillermo von Zellheim (cyclist)
- Carlos Widmer (cyclist)
- Ana Wulff (cyclist)

=== Handball ===
- Alejandra Burgardt (handball player)
- Elke Karsten (handball player)
- Matías Schulz (handball player)

=== Hockey ===
- Ignacio Bergner (hockey player)
- Claudia Burkart (hockey player)
- Martín Gebhardt (hockey player)
- Guillermo Herrmann (world champion roller hockey player)
- Josefina Rübenacker (field hockey player)
- Otto Schmitt (field hockey player)
- Rodolfo Schmitt (field hockey player)

=== Football ===
- Diego Daniel Ackermann (football player)
- Martín Ángel Aguirre Schmidt (football player)
- Damián Akermann (football player)
- Rafael Albrecht (football player)
- Guillermo Asselborn (football player)
- Fabián Assmann (football player)
- Marcelo Baier (football player)
- Carlos Bechtholdt (football player)
- Franco Bechtholdt (football player)
- Diego Becker (football player)
- Pablo Becker (football player)
- Walter Behrens (football player)
- Lisandro Beratz (football player)
- Luciano Beutler (football player)
- Claudio Bieler (football player)
- Néstor Breitenbruch (football player)
- Cristian Clementz (football player)
- Fernando Clementz (football player)
- Fabián Dauwalder (football player)
- Emanuel Dening (football player)
- Faustino Dettler (football player)
- Gabriel Dietrich (football player)
- Christian Dollberg (football player)
- Mauro Dobler (football player)
- Aldo Duscher (football player)
- Cristian Ekeroth (football player)
- Juan Esnáider (football player)
- Hernán Fener (football player)
- Juan Matías Fischer (football player)
- Rodolfo Fischer (football player)
- Alfredo Fogel (football player)
- Silvio Fogel (football player)
- Elvio Fredrich (football player)
- Matías Fritzler (football player)
- Julio Furch (football player)
- Adolfo Gaich (football player)
- Mauro Néstor Gerk (football player)
- Paolo Goltz (football player)
- Hugo Gottfrit (football player)
- Claudio Graf (football player)
- Patricio Graff (football player)
- Oscar Enrique Haack (football player)
- Carlos Haberkon (football player)
- Valentín Haberkon (football player)
- Federico Haberkorn (football player)
- German Hasner (football player)
- Mariano Hässell (football player)
- Agustín Hausch (football player)
- Diego German Heck (football player)
- Dario Heger (football player)
- Juan José Heiland (football player)
- Eduardo Pedro Heinrich (football player)
- Hernan Alejandro Heinze (football player)
- Gabriel Heinze (football player, manager)
- Gustavo Heinze (football player)
- Eduardo Heisecke (football player)
- Adolfo Heisinger (football player)
- Gustavo César Heit (football player)
- Cristian Horacio Hergenreder (football player)
- Marcos Hermann (football player)
- Diego Herner (football player)
- Mauro Herman (football player)
- Marius Hiller (football player)
- Analía Hirmbruchner (football player)
- Adolfo Hirsch (football player)
- Santiago Hirsig (football player)
- J. Hobecker (football player)
- Cristian Hofmann (football player)
- Juan Hohberg (football player, coach)
- José Manuel Hollender (football player)
- Miguel Ángel Hollman (football player)
- Néstor Ariel Holweger (football player)
- Henry Héctor Homann (football player)
- César Horst (football player)
- Federico Horster (football player)
- René Houseman (football player)
- Daniel Huber (football player)
- Clarisa Huber (football player)
- Víctor Hugo Humhoffer (football player)
- José Humhoffer (football player)
- Horacio Humoller (football player)
- Juan Carlos Hurt (football player)
- Walter Kannemann (football player)
- Adrián Kees (football player)
- Brian Kees (football player)
- Héctor Humberto Kees (football player)
- Leonardo Alberto Kees (football player)
- Martín Alejandro Kees (football player)
- Alejandro Kenig (football player)
- José María Kesseler (football player)
- Eduardo Kindernech (football player)
- Ariel Kippes (football player)
- Cristian Kippes (football player)
- Nicolás Kissner (football player)
- Rodolfo Klasmeier (football player)
- Eugenio Klein (football player)
- René Kloker (football player)
- Armando Kloster (football player)
- Álvaro Klusener (football player)
- Gonzalo Klusener (football player)
- Matías Knell (football player)
- Rubén Dario Koegler (football player)
- Daniel Alberto Krabler (football player)
- Andrés Kranevitter (football player)
- Matías Kranevitter (football player)
- Gastón Kranevitter (football player)
- Germán Kranz (football player)
- Roberto Krausemann (football player)
- Juan Kresser (football player)
- Guillermo Krueger (football player)
- Gerardo Kruger (football player)
- Jeremías Kruger (football player)
- Luis Kuchen (football player)
- Santiago Kuhl (football player)
- Luciano Kummer (football player)
- Facundo Laumann (football player)
- Roberto Laumann (football player)
- Rodrigo Lechner (football player)
- Christian Leichner (football player)
- Matías Leichner (football player)
- Eduardo Lell (football player)
- Germán Lessmann (football player)
- Milton Leyendecker (football player)
- Lucas Licht (football player)
- Emanuel Loeschbor (football player)
- Federico Lussenhoff (football player)
- Germán Lux (football player)
- Javier Lux (football player)
- Diego Maier (football player)
- Germán Mayenfisch (football player)
- Andrés Mehring (football player)
- Javier Meier (football player)
- Carlos Agustín Meyer (football player)
- Carlos Alberto Meyer (football player)
- Kevin Meyer (football player)
- Luis Meyer (football player)
- Rodrigo Germán Meyer (football player)
- Elisabeth Minnig (football player)
- Jerónimo Morales Neumann (football player)
- David Müller (football player)
- Germán Muller (football player)
- Julio Müller (football player)
- Leonel Müller (football player)
- Marcelo Müller (football player)
- Milton Axel Müller (football player)
- Oscar Müller (football player)
- Ramón Müller (football player)
- Víctor Javier Müller (football player)
- Dionisio Neumann (football player)
- Horacio Neumann (football player)
- Sebastián Nicolás Neuspiller (football player)
- Alan Nungeser (football player)
- Thiago Nuss (football player)
- Marcio Germán Ostertag (football player)
- Guillermo Pfund (football player)
- Sebastián Prediger (football player)
- Martín Prost (football player)
- Daniel Raschle (football player)
- Mario Redel (football player)
- Oscar Regenhardt (football player)
- Jonatan Regner (football player)
- Gustavo Reingel (football player)
- Tobías Reinhart (football player)
- Alfredo Resler (football player)
- Diego Riegard (football player)
- Pedro Rithner (football player)
- Maximiliano Riep (football player)
- Leandro Rietzsch (football player)
- Diego Rikert (football player)
- Benjamín Rollheiser (football player)
- Matías Roskopf (football player)
- Gabriel Roth (football player)
- Santiago Rudolf (football player)
- Gustavo Ruhl (football player)
- Adriana Sachs (football player)
- Joel Sacks (football player)
- Luis Sauer (football player)
- Florencia Senger (football player)
- Pablo Matías Schab (football player)
- Joaquín Schaberger (football player)
- Bruno Schaab (football player)
- Franco Schaab (football player)
- Sergio Schabb (football player)
- Emilio Schachtel (football player)
- Alejandro Schaffer (football player)
- José Antonio Schaffer (football player)
- Juan Cruz Schaechel (football player)
- Jose Antonio Schaffer (football player)
- Carlos Daniel Schamberger (football player)
- Angel Osvaldo Schandlein (football player)
- San Darca Schatenoffer (football player)
- Juan Pablo Schefer (football player)
- Horacio Scheffer (football player)
- Ruben Scheffer (football player)
- Ignacio Schell (football player)
- Sofía Schell (football player)
- Mateo Schenfeld (football player)
- Maximiliano Schenfeld (football player)
- Carlos Ángel Scherl (football player)
- Matías Scherrer (football player)
- Rodrigo Schlegel (football player)
- Marcelo Ruben Schenker (football player)
- Dario Ezequiel Scher (football player)
- Carlos Angel Scherl (football player)
- Matias Damian Scherrer (football player)
- Pablo Schiebelbein (football player)
- Leandro Schimittlein (football player)
- Damián Schimmelfenning (football player)
- Jonathan Schimpp (football player)
- Martín Schlotthauer (football player)
- Hernan Mauricio Schlotthauer (football player)
- Gonzalo Daniel Schmidhalter (football player)
- Bryan Schmidt (football player)
- Damián Schmidt (football player)
- Gastón Ezequiel Schmidt (football player)
- Germán Schmidt (football player)
- Raúl Daniel Schmidt (football player, coach)
- Eric Schmil (football player)
- Pablo Schmitt (football player)
- Carlos Roberto Schneider (football player)
- Diego Schneider (football player)
- Juan Carlos Schneider (football player)
- Maxi Schneider (football player)
- Leonel Schoeder (football player)
- Cristian Scholotthauer (football player)
- Nelson Carlos Schomberger (football player)
- Alan Schönfeld (football player)
- Gonzalo Schonfeld (football player)
- Milton Schonfeld (football player)
- Luis Guillermo Schoning (football player)
- Marcelo Schoning (football player)
- Ignacio Schor (football player)
- Augusto Schott (football player)
- Ruben Schroh (football player)
- Sergio Schulmeister (football player)
- Adolfo Schultz (football player)
- Kevin Schultz (football player)
- Emilio Schulz (football player)
- Lautaro Schulz (football player)
- Jonatan Schulze (football player)
- Martin Schulze (football player)
- Horacio Schumacher (football player)
- Gerardo Martin Schunk (football player)
- Jonathan Schunke (football player)
- Leandro Schunke (football player)
- Gabriel Schürrer (football player)
- Leandro Schwab (football player)
- Ataliva Schweizer (football player)
- Ramiro Schweizer (football player)
- Gerardo Schwendtner (football player)
- Guillermo Jose Damian Schwenzel (football player)
- Cristian Schwindt (football player)
- Dante Senger (football player)
- Juan Siebelist (football player)
- Cristian Smigiel (football player)
- Gastón Stang (football player)
- Rodrigo Stark (football player)
- Claudio Steimbach (football player)
- Jorge Steiner (football player)
- Damián Steinert (football player)
- Hugo Steinert (football player)
- Alberto Stork (football player)
- Juan Raul Stork (football player)
- Juan Enrique Strak (football player)
- Leon Strembel (football player)
- Daniel Tílger (football player, coach)
- Maximiliano Tormann (football player)
- Jorge Emanuel Vogel (football player)
- Lucas Vogel (football player)
- Ricardo Volk (football player)
- Carlos Wagner (football player)
- Martín Wagner (football player)
- Ricardo Wagner (football player)
- Eddy Wainer (football player)
- Fernando Walter (football player)
- Jose Walter (football player)
- Raul Walter (football player)
- Ricardo Walter (football player)
- Rodrigo Wasinger (football player)
- Walter Wasinger (football player)
- Luis Weht (football player)
- Luis Weihmuller (football player)
- Jorge Ariel Weimann (football player)
- Miguel Weimbinder (football player)
- Germán Weiner (football player)
- Claudio Weinzettel (football player)
- Juan José Weissen (football player)
- Bruno Weisser (football player)
- Adolfo Arturo Wenner (football player)
- Gabriel Wentland (football player)
- Axel Werner (football player)
- Daniel José Werner (football player)
- Carlos Weyreuter (football player)
- Renzo Widmann (football player)
- Rodney Widmann (football player)
- Carlos Wilgenhoff (football player)
- Jonathan Wilgenhoff (football player)
- Matías Willhuber (football player)
- Fernando Wolhfart (football player)
- Oscar Wonner (football player)
- Oscar Wunderlich (football player)
- Diego Yacob (football player)
- Walter Yacob (football player)
- Rodolfo Enrique Zimmermann (football player)
- Rodolfo Luis Zimmermann (football player)
- Oscar Zitterkopf (football player)
- Víctor Zwenger (football player)

=== Racing ===
- Maximiliano Baumgartner (racing driver)
- Pablo Birger (racing driver, he raced in two World Championship Grands Prix for the Gordini team)
- Néstor Flaumer (racing driver)
- Delfina Frers (racing driver)
- Otto Fritzler (racing driver)
- Joel Gassmann (racing driver)
- Roberto Geringer (canoe racer)
- Nicolás Kern (racing driver)
- German Glessner (skeleton racer)
- Jorge Kissling (racing driver)
- Juan Pablo Koch (racing driver)
- Claudio Kohler (racing driver)
- Alejandro Kuhn (racing driver)
- Carlos Löeffel (racing driver)
- Damián Markel (racing driver)
- Carlos Reusch (racing driver)
- Jorge Ringelmann (racing driver)
- Claudio Roth (racing driver)
- Ricardo Senn (track and road bicycle racer)
- Germán Schroeder (racing driver)
- Adolfo Schwelm Cruz (racing driver)
- Marcos Siebert (racing driver)
- Ricardo Wagner (racing driver)
- Gabriel Werner (racing driver)
- Mariano Werner (racing driver)

=== Rowing ===
- Julio Alles (olympic rower)
- Juan Ecker (olympic rower)
- Juan Huber (olympic rower)
- Rubén Knulst (olympic rower)
- Enrique Lingenfelder (olympic rower)
- Armin Meyer (olympic rower)
- Walter Naneder (olympic rower)
- Teodoro Nölting (olympic rower)
- Guillermo Pfaab (olympic rower)
- Federico Probst (olympic rower)
- Jorge Schneider (olympic rower)

=== Sailing ===
- Carlos Miguel Benn (olympic sailor)
- María Sol Branz (olympic sailor)
- Jorge Brauer (olympic sailor)
- Germán Frers (yachting champion)
- Roberto Haas (olympic sailor)
- Lourdes Hartkopf (olympic sailor)
- Edelf Hosmann (olympic sailor)
- Ludovico Kempter (olympic sailor)
- Klaus Lange (olympic sailor)
- Santiago Lange (olympic sailor)
- Yago Lange (olympic sailor)
- Juan Carlos Milberg (olympic sailor)
- Horacio Seeber (olympic sailor)
- Carlos Sieburger (olympic sailor)
- Enrique Sieburger Jr. (sailor and Olympic medalist)
- Enrique Sieburger Sr. (sailor and Olympic medalist)
- Julio Sieburger (sailor and Olympic medalist)
- Roberto Sieburger (olympic sailor)
- Rodolfo Vollenweider (olympic sailor)
- Werner von Foerster (olympic sailor)

=== Shooting ===
- Alexis Eberhardt (shooter)
- Federico Grüben (shooter)
- Sigfrido Vogel (shooter)
- Alliana Volkart (shooter)

=== Swimming ===
- Úrsula Frick (olympic swimmer)
- Cristina Hardekopf (olympic swimmer)
- Silvia Hofmeister (olympic swimmer)
- Federico Neumayer (olympic swimmer)
- Ana María Schultz (olympic swimmer)
- Patricia Spohn (olympic swimmer)
- Federico Zwanck (olympic swimmer)

=== Tennis ===
- German Gaich (tennis player)
- Federica Haumüller (tennis player)
- Lucia Huber (tennis player)
- Erica Krauth (tennis player)
- Vanesa Krauth (tennis player)
- Leonardo Mayer (tennis player)
- Andrés Schneiter (tennis player)
- Eduardo Schwank (tennis player)

=== Volleyball ===
- Rodrigo Aschemacher (volleyball player)
- Carolina Hartmann (volleyball player)
- Georgina Klug (volleyball player)
- Roberto Kruger (volleyball player)
- Ileana Leyendeker (volleyball player)
- Augustin Loser, (volleyball player)
- Victoria Mayer (volleyball player)
- Natalia Mildenberger (volleyball player)
- Lautaro Mohr (volleyball player)
- Ivana Müller (volleyball player)
- Yésica Rudolf (volleyball player)
- Gustavo Scholtis (volleyball player)
- Valeria Schoroeter (volleyball player)
- Micaela Vogel (volleyball player)
- Carlos Wagenpfeil (olympic volleyball player)
- Carlos Weber (olympic volleyball player)

=== Windsurfing ===
- Jazmín López Becker (windsurfer)
- Mariano Reutemann (windsurfer)
- Catalina Walther (windsurfer)

=== Other sports ===
- Albert Becker (chess player)
- Alejandro Bender (judoka)
- Eduardo Brenner (rock climber)
- Débora Hait (taekwondo)
- Cristian Schmidt (judoka)
- Roberto Fischer (water polo player)
- Sonja Graf (chess master)
- Gonzalo Hahn (polo player)
- Ernesto Hartkopf (equestrianism)
- Ricardo Holler (cross-country skier)
- Oscar Karpenkopf (judoka)
- Vicente Krause (fencer)
- Matías Kruger (futsal player)
- Yuri Maier (olympic wrestler)
- Paul Michel (chess player)
- María Florencia Olheiser (softball player)
- Heinrich Reinhardt (chess master)
- Enrique Rettberg (fencer)
- Agustina Roth (BMX rider)
- Alex Schoenauer (fighter)
- Carlos Seigeshifer (weightlifting)
- Matías Stinnes (luge player)
- Norberto von Baumann (cross-country skier)
- Alan Wagner (golf player)
- Antonio Walzer (wrestler)
- Paula Wegscheider (taekwondo)
- Fernando Wilhelm (futsal player)

== Others ==
- Silvio Gesell (merchant, theoretical economist, social activist, anarchist and founder of Freiwirtschaft)
- Natty Hollmann (philanthropist, also known as Naty Petrosino, elected "International Woman of the Year"- 2006- by the Autonomous Region of Valle d'Aosta in Northern Italy, nominated for the Nobel Peace Prize in 2009)
- Robledo Puch (serial killer)
- Alfredo Ruprecht (judge)
- Fernando von Reichenbach (engineer and inventor)
- Ana Rosa Schlieper de Martínez Guerrero (philanthropist, activist)
- Claus Zieschank (his body was the first one found in Río de La Plata edges, as an evidence of crimes during the last dictatorship)

== See also ==
- German Argentines
- German diaspora
- Immigration to Argentina
