= Bechtholdt =

Bechtholdt is a German surname. Notable people with the surname include:

- Carlos Bechtholdt (born 1969), Argentine footballer
- Franco Bechtholdt (born 1993), Argentine-born Chilean footballer
