= José Soriano =

José Soriano may refer to:

- José Soriano (baseball) (born 1998), Dominican baseball player
- José Soriano (footballer) (1917–2011), Peruvian football goalkeeper
- Pepe Soriano (born 1929 as José Carlos Soriano), Argentine actor
