= Javier Lux =

Argentine footballer

Personal information
- Full name: Javier Alejandro Lux
- Date of birth: July 10, 1977 (age 49)
- Place of birth: Carcarañá, Argentina
- Height: 1.81 m (5 ft 11 in)
- Position: Midfielder

Senior career*
Years	Team	Apps	(Gls)
1997–2002	Racing Club	112	(5)
2002–2003	Talleres	30	(2)
2003–2004	Estudiantes de La Plata	25	(0)
2004–2005	Instituto	31	(1)
2005	Banfield	9	(0)
2006–2007	Arsenal de Sarandí	18	(0)
2007–2009	Belgrano	45	(0)
Total		270	(8)
- * Club domestic league appearances and goals

Javier Lux (born 10 July 1977, in Carcarañá, Santa Fe Province) is a retired Argentine football midfielder. His brother, Germán Lux, is a goalkeeper who has represented Argentina internationally.

== Club career ==
Lux started his career with Racing Club de Avellaneda in 1995. He was part of the squad that won the Apertura tournament in 2001. In 2002, he left to join Talleres de Córdoba spending one season at the club before spending one season each at Estudiantes de La Plata and Instituto de Córdoba.

After a short spell with Club Atlético Banfield in 2006, Lux joined Arsenal de Sarandí where he helped them to qualify for the Copa Libertadores for the first time in their history. Lux then moved down a division to play for Belgrano.

== Honours ==
Season	Club	Title
Apertura 2001	Racing Club	Primera División Argentina
