= Julio Bocca =

Argentine ballet dancer

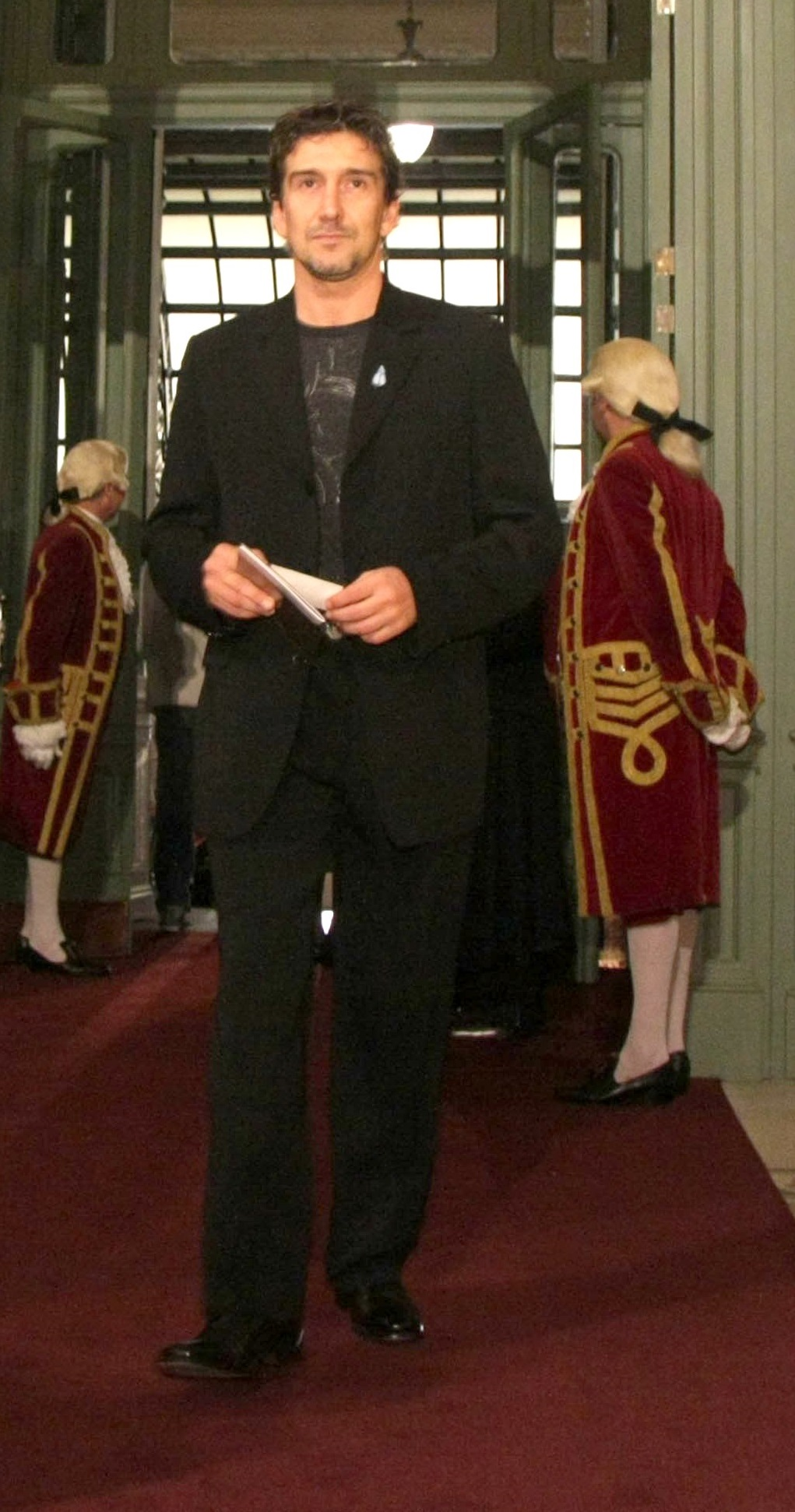
- Born: March 6, 1967 (age 59); Buenos Aires, Argentina
- Occupation: Artistic director
- Years active: 1982-2007
- Dancing career
- Former groups: Fundación Teresa Carreño; Teatro Municipal of Río de Janeiro; American Ballet Theatre; Ballet Argentino

Julio Adrián Lojo Bocca (born March 6, 1967) is an Argentine ballet dancer. Bocca spent twenty years as a principal dancer with American Ballet Theatre. From 2010 to 2018, he served as artistic director of the National Ballet of Uruguay, administered by SODRE, the country's broadcasting and cultural authority.

Bocca has been called one of the most popular Argentine dancers of all time.

== Early life and career ==
Born in the Munro neighborhood of the Greater Buenos Aires, he started ballet lessons at the age of four, and at the age of seven entered the National School of Dance, progressing to the Teatro Colón's Advanced Arts Institute a year later. His mother was a dance teacher who encouraged his studies.

Bocca joined the Chamber Ballet Company at the Colón Theatre in 1981. A year later, he began performing as a soloist in a production directed by Danish choreographer Flemming Flindt. In 1985, aged 18, he won the gold medal at the International Ballet Competition in Moscow and was invited to join the American Ballet Theatre by Mikhail Baryshnikov, the youngest principal dancer ever hired. Although Bocca was a principal dancer, he was allowed to perform frequently as a guest artists with other companies. In 1987, he was named Dancer of the Year by the New York Times.

As a guest artist, Bocca has performed with companies such as La Scala in Milan, the Paris Opera, the Kirov of Saint Petersburg, the Royal Danish Ballet, the Cuban National Ballet and the National Ballet of Madrid, and the Bolshoi Ballet. A performance with the Royal Ballet in London prompted a reviewer with Dance Magazine to rave about "his irresistible combination of passion and gallantry."

Bocca achieved extreme popularity in his native Argentina, frequently filling up soccer stadiums during his performances

In 1990, he created his own ballet company, the Ballet Argentino, which performs regularly in theatres around the globe. Bocca often collaborates with the Argentine dancer Eleonora Cassano. From 1997 to 2001 Bocca's dance partner with the Ballet Argentino was Luciana Paris. In 2000 Julio Bocca participated in the international Millennium Day event, dancing in Ushuaia with Cassano and the Ballet Argentino in a performance broadcast to the whole world.

Julio Bocca has also mixed ballet dancing with tango, a combination that has been very well received by the public. In 1998, he appeared in the film Tango, no me dejes nunca (English title: Tango), which gained him a new audience. In combining ballet with tango, he has often worked with the tango choreographer Ana Maria Stekelman. Bocca's repertoire with Ballet Argentino also includes contemporary, jazz, ballroom and modern styles of dancing.

In 2000, he appeared in Fosse, a Broadway musical showcasing the work of choreographer Bob Fosse.

Bocca danced his farewell performance with ballerina Alessandra Ferri in the American Ballet Theatre's production of Manon on June 22 and 23, 2006. He continued to perform with his Ballet Argentino until his retirement from dancing at the end of 2007.

His biography, Julio Bocca, La Vida en Danza, by the French journalist Angeline Montoya, was published in Argentina in March 2007 by the Spanish publisher Aguilar.

He was named director of the Ballet Nacional SODRE by Uruguay's president José Mujica in March 2010.

Bocca served as a president of the jury at the Prix de Lausanne ballet competition in 2016.

In 2017 Bocca was one of the juries at the Benois de la Danse.

== Awards ==
The awards Julio Bocca has received include:

- 1985 - Golden Medal 1985 (International Contest) in Moscow.
- 1986 - Primus Inter Pares in Buenos Aires
- 1987 - Dancer of the year 1987 (New York Times), in New York City
- 1990 - Acquidanza in Acqui-Terme, Italy
- 1990 - Gino Tani Award, in Rome
- 1990 - Best International Classic Dancer (Iberoamerican Dancing Association) in Barcelona
- 1991 - Léonide Massine in Positano, Italy
- 1992 - Prix Benois de la Danse (International Coreografers Association) at the Bolshoi Theatre
- 1999 - Platinum Konex for Male Ballet Dancer (Konex Foundation) in Buenos Aires
