= Cycling at the 2019 Pan American Games – Women's BMX freestyle =

Women's BMX freestyle at the 2019 Pan American Games
- Venue: Circuito BMX
- Date: 11 August 2019
- Competitors: 8 from 8 nations
- Winning score: 86.67

Medalists
Gold medal	Hannah Roberts; United States
Silver medal	Macarena Perez Grasset; Chile
Bronze medal	Agustina Roth; Argentina

The women's BMX freestyle competition of the cycling events at the 2019 Pan American Games was held on 11 August 2019 at the Circuito BMX.

== Schedule ==
Date	Time	Round
11 August 2019	11:25	Seeding
11 August 2019	12:37	Final

== Results ==
=== Seeding ===
8 riders from 8 countries was started

Rank	Name	Nation	Run 1	Run 2	Score
1	Hannah Roberts	United States	85.00	83.83	84.42
2	Macarena Perez Grasset	Chile	73.33	71.67	72.50
3	Daniela Moran	Colombia	59.53	60.50	60.02
4	Agustina Roth	Argentina	55.50	54.67	55.08
5	Margarita Valenzuela	Mexico	65.83	40.67	53.25
6	Anahi Molina	Ecuador	51.33	53.67	52.50
7	Derlayne Dias	Brazil	54.33	49.00	51.67
8	Yeinkerly Hernández	Venezuela	36.00	36.00	36.00

=== Final ===
Rank	Name	Nation	Run 1	Run 2	Score
1st place, gold medalist(s)	Hannah Roberts	United States	86.67	24.33	86.67
2nd place, silver medalist(s)	Macarena Perez Grasset	Chile	67.00	76.67	76.67
3rd place, bronze medalist(s)	Agustina Roth	Argentina	64.67	71.00	71.00
4	Daniela Moran	Colombia	61.00	68.00	68.00
5	Margarita Valenzuela	Mexico	62.33	66.33	66.33
6	Anahi Molina	Ecuador	59.00	55.33	59.00
7	Derlayne Dias	Brazil	34.00	48.00	48.00
8	Yeinkerly Hernández	Venezuela	20.67	28.00	28.00
