= Ana María Stekelman =

Argentine choreographer

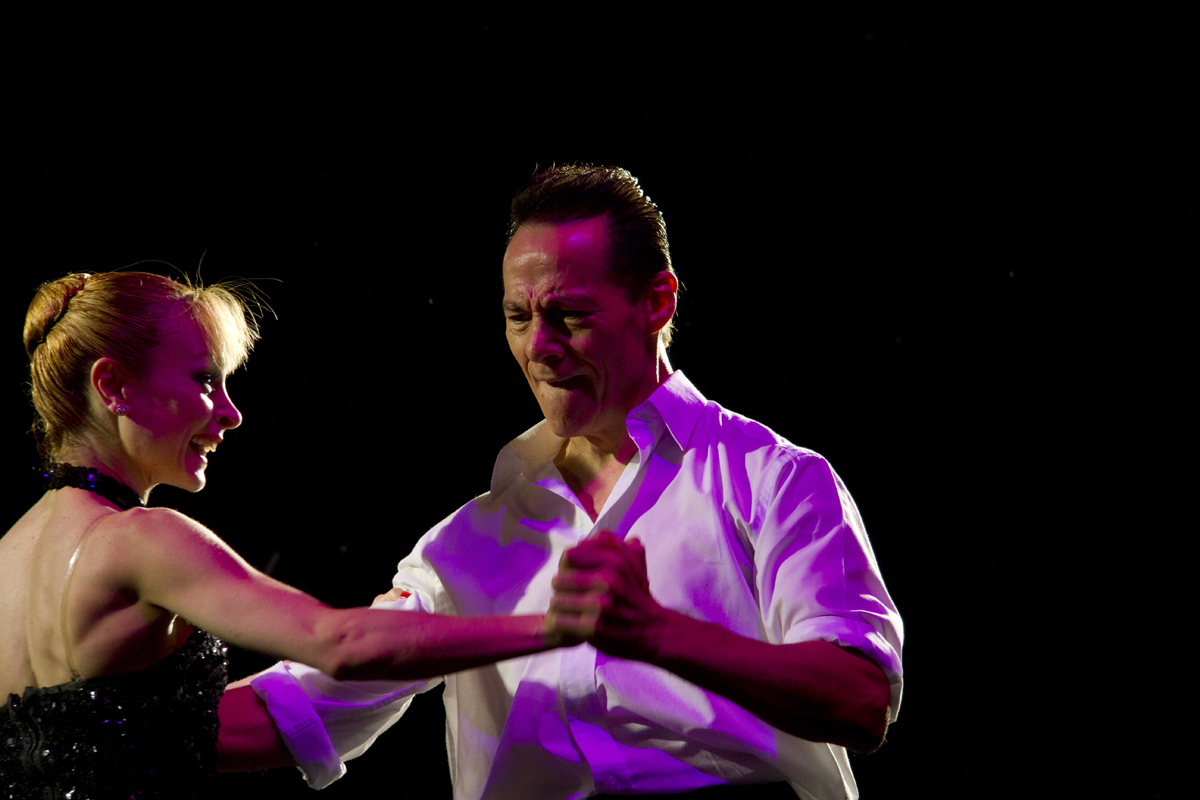
Ana María Stekelman and Tangokinesis, during the "Día del Tango 2012"

Ana María Stekelman is one of Argentina’s leading choreographers and is the founder of the Tangokinesis dance troupe.

== Life ==
Stekelman studied modern dance in Buenos Aires with Paulina Ossona and Renate Schottelius and then traveled to New York, where she studied at the Martha Graham Dance School.

In 1968 she joined the Oscar Araiz School of Dance and in 1972 attended the Opera College, where she studied dance and music research). She was a founder member of the San Martin Theatre Contemporary Ballet and was Artistic Director of the company between 1977 and 1981 and again between 1988 and 1990. In 1976, 1978 and 1990, she was invited to participate in the American Dance Festival.

After creating Tangokinesis, she continued her research into the fusion of tango and modern dance. The company has toured the world, performing in the most important cultural festivals, such as: The Autumn Festival in Madrid, Biennale de la Danse de Lyon, Colorado Dance Festival, The American Dance Festival, World Financial Center in New York, and twice at the Kennedy Center. She was the only Argentine choreographer invited to close the Festival of Avignon in the Coeur d'honneur del Palais des Papes in 1999. Working with Julio Bocca, Tangokinesis performed at the Paris Opera Garnier, showcasing the worldwide premiere of Consagración del Tango (Tango's Consecration).

The main feature of the Tangokinesis is not only the fusion of two choreographic languages (Modern Dance and Tango) but also the fact that the group employs dancers with very different disciplines: the women are from the classic and modern dance background, whereas the men are trained in tango and folklore.

Stekelman has created pieces for different ballet companies around the world, including the Ballet Stagium of Brazil, Ballet du Nord in France, Ballet dell' Opera of Rome, the National Ballet of Chile, and the Colon Theatre of Buenos Aires. She has created several works for internationally renowned dancer Julio Bocca: Concertango, Consagración del Tango, Mambo Suite, Piazzolla Tango Vivo; Bocca Tango, Repercusiones and El hombre de la corbata roja.

In addition, Stekelman was asked by Spanish movie director Carlos Saura to choreograph some scenes for the film Tango, for which she was awarded the American Choreography Award in Los Angeles and was nominated for an Academy Award. In April 2002, Tangokinesis was selected to feature in the documentary film Tango Désir produced by the French Arte channel, and in September 2003 she was invited by the Hebbel Theatre to perform at the Marlene Dietrich Square in Berlin with the show Tango, Vals, Tango.

Stekelman continues to work in Buenos Aires, and regularly tours Europe and the Americas with Tangokinesis.

Prizes, awards and nominations

- 1998 Nominated for the Estrella de Mar award for Consagración del Tango
- 1998 Trinidad Guevara Award for Tango y Fuga
- 1998 Theatre XXI Award for
- 1998 Teatro del Mundo Award from Buenos Aires University for Catálogo
- 1999 Atrevidas Award for her lifetime's artistic work
- 2000 Estrella de Mar Award for Mambo Suite
- 2000 American Choreography Award for the film Tango
- 2000 Nominated for the ACE Award for Tango, Vals, Tango
- 2000 Teatro del Mundo Award for Tango, Vals, Tango
- 2000 Lifetime achievement Atrevidas Award
- 2001 Estrella de Mar Award for Tangokinesis and Piazzolla Tango Vivo
- 2001 ACE Award for Angeles desnudos. Best Choreographer.
- 2001 Lifetime Achievement Award from the Argentine Chamber of Art and Culture
- 2002 Estrella de Mar Award for Bocca Tango
- 2002 Nominated for the Trinidad Guevara Award for Bocca Tango
- 2002 Teatro del Mundo Award for Operatango
- 2003 Estrella de Mar Award for Repercusiones
- 2003 Florencio Sanchez Award for Operatango
- 2004 Nominated for Teatro del Mundo Award for El hombre de la corbata roja and Bésame
- 2005 Nominated for the Teatro del Mundo Award for Lentejuelas Cotillón and Bathory

== Personal life ==
Stekelman was born in Buenos Aires into a family of Russian-Jewish origin.
