= Cycling at the 2018 Summer Youth Olympics – Mixed BMX freestyle park =

Mixed BMX freestyle park at the III Summer Youth Olympic Games
- Venue: Parque Tres de Febrero
- Dates: 10–11 October
- Competitors: 16 from 9 nations

Medalists
1st place, gold medalist(s)		Agustina Roth; Iñaki Iriartes	Argentina
1st place, gold medalist(s)		Lara Lessmann; Evan Brandes	Germany
3rd place, bronze medalist(s)		Yuma Oshimo; Kanami Tanno	Japan

These are the results for the mixed BMX freestyle park event at the 2018 Summer Youth Olympics.

== Results ==
=== Women ===
==== Seeding ====
Rank	Athlete	Run 1	Run 2	Score
1	Lara Lessmann (GER)	74.66	86.00	80.33
2	Agustina Roth (ARG)	70.00	71.66	70.83
3	Kanami Tanno (JPN)	64.33	63.33	63.83
4	Valeriia Pinkina (RUS)	59.66	59.33	59.49
5	Nikol Přikrylová (CZE)	55.66	48.33	51.99
6	Eduarda Bordignon (BRA)	50.66	49.33	49.99
7	Yeinkerly Hernández (VEN)	41.66	39.33	40.49
8	Estefanya Echeverry (COL)	43.33	37.33	40.33

==== Qualification ====
Rank	Athlete	Run 1	Run 2	Score
1	Lara Lessmann (GER)	82.00	82.33	82.16
2	Agustina Roth (ARG)	66.66	71.00	68.83
3	Kanami Tanno (JPN)	64.33	65.66	64.99
4	Valeriia Pinkina (RUS)	60.00	61.33	60.66
5	Nikol Přikrylová (CZE)	53.00	54.00	53.50
6	Estefanya Echeverry (COL)	40.33	46.33	43.33
7	Yeinkerly Hernández (VEN)	26.00	37.66	31.83
8	Eduarda Bordignon (BRA)	33.00	28.33	30.66

==== Finals ====
Rank	Athlete	Run 1	Run 2	Score	Group
1	Lara Lessmann (GER)	83.33	83.66	83.66	Big Final
2	Agustina Roth (ARG)	72.33	74.00	74.00	Big Final
3	Kanami Tanno (JPN)	71.00	67.00	71.00	Big Final
4	Valeriia Pinkina (RUS)	62.33	58.66	62.33	Big Final
5	Nikol Přikrylová (CZE)	59.33	59.50	59.50	Small Final
6	Eduarda Bordignon (BRA)	56.00	57.33	57.33	Small Final
7	Estefanya Echeverry (COL)	48.66	46.33	48.66	Small Final
8	Yeinkerly Hernández (VEN)	41.33	40.33	41.33	Small Final

=== Men ===
==== Seeding ====
Rank	Athlete	Run 1	Run 2	Score
1	Evan Brandes (GER)	79.33	83.66	81.49
2	Sebastián Martínez (COL)	73.33	76.00	74.66
3	Alexander Kim (RUS)	72.33	66.66	69.49
4	Iñaki Iriartes (ARG)	77.00	59.33	68.16
5	Yuma Oshimo (JPN)	70.00	60.66	65.33
6	Martin Habada (CZE)	52.66	57.50	55.08
7	Wesley Moraes (BRA)	57.66	50.33	53.99
8	Patriks Vīksna (LAT)	60.66	44.66	52.66

==== Qualification ====
Rank	Athlete	Run 1	Run 2	Score
1	Evan Brandes (GER)	82.00	85.33	83.66
2	Iñaki Iriartes (ARG)	72.33	87.33	79.83
3	Patriks Vīksna (LAT)	67.66	69.00	68.33
4	Yuma Oshimo (JPN)	64.00	65.33	64.66
5	Alexander Kim (RUS)	58.33	67.16	62.74
6	Sebastián Martínez (COL)	59.33	59.66	59.49
7	Wesley Moraes (BRA)	39.00	50.00	44.50
8	Martin Habada (CZE)	43.00	28.33	35.66

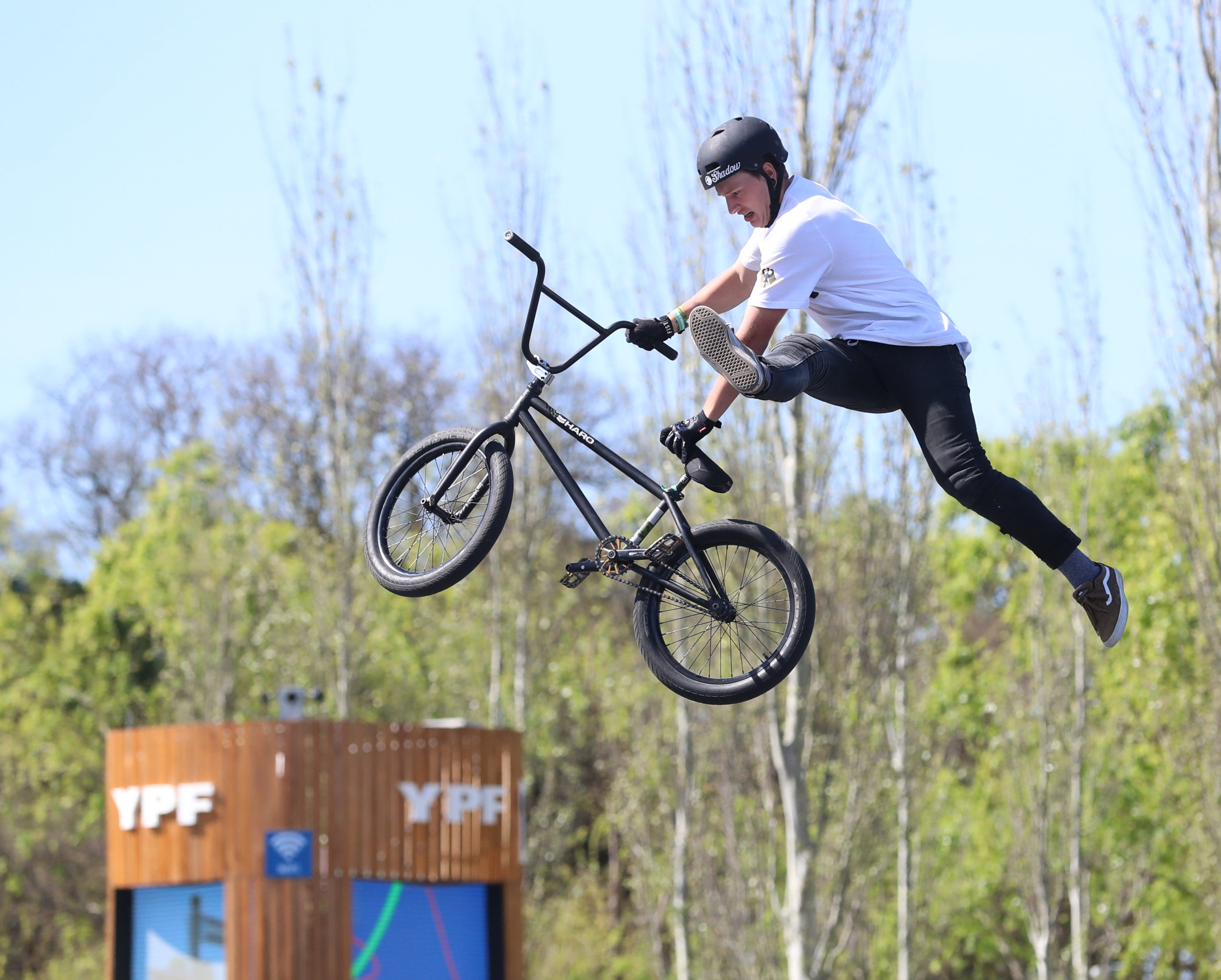
Evan Brandes

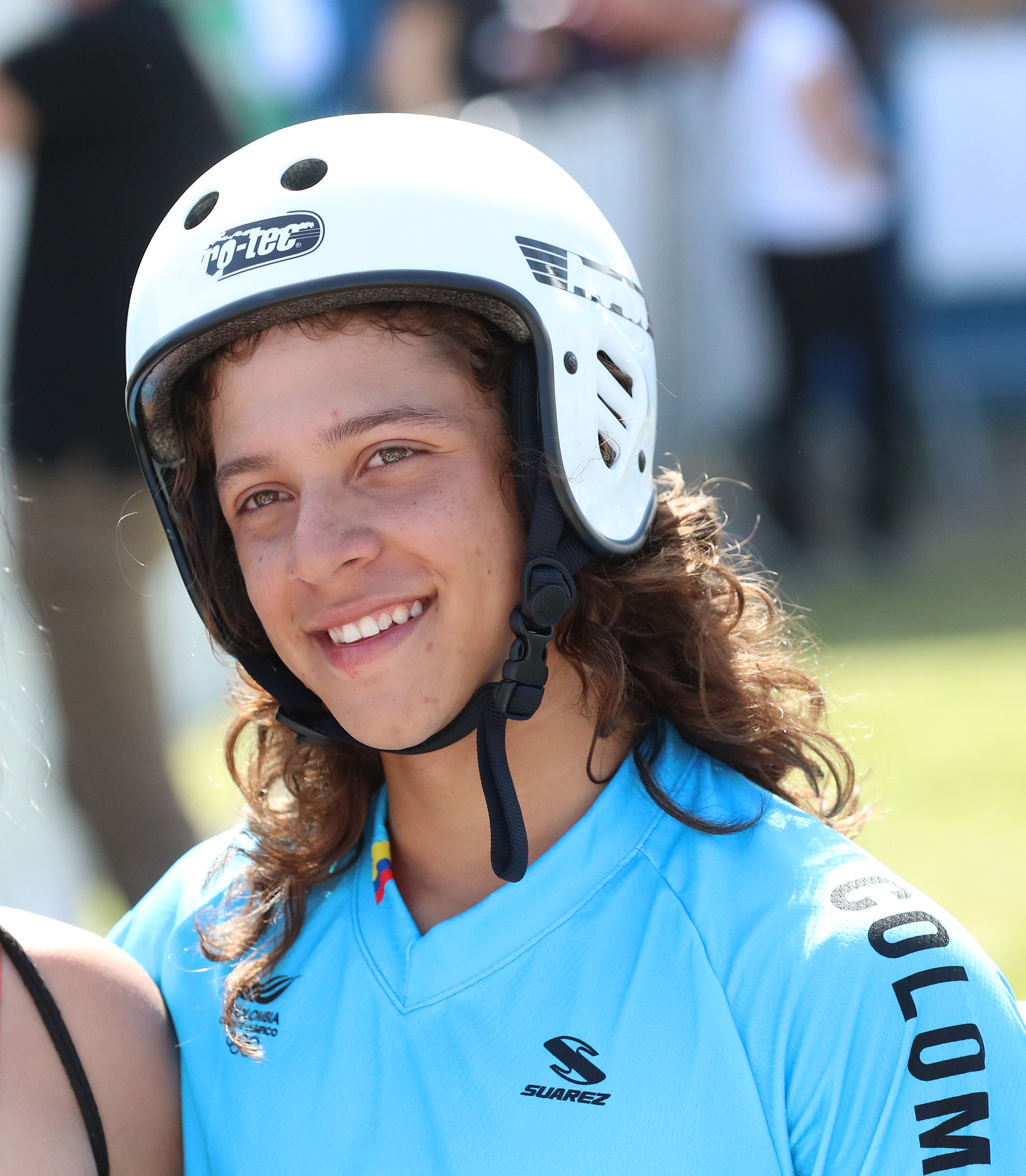
Sebastián Martínez

==== Finals ====
Rank	Athlete	Run 1	Run 2	Score	Group
1	Iñaki Iriartes (ARG)	81.00	83.33	83.33	Big Final
2	Evan Brandes (GER)	78.33	82.00	82.00	Big Final
3	Patriks Vīksna (LAT)	74.00	74.83	74.83	Big Final
4	Yuma Oshimo (JPN)	71.66	70.00	71.66	Big Final
5	Sebastián Martínez (COL)	72.00	12.00	72.00	Small Final
6	Martin Habada (CZE)	67.66	43.66	67.66	Small Final
7	Alexander Kim (RUS)	48.66	65.00	65.00	Small Final
8	Wesley Moraes (BRA)	55.0	51.33	55.00	Small Final

=== Team classification ===
Rank	Team	Athlete	Rank	Points	Total
1st place, gold medalist(s)	Argentina	Agustina Roth	2	10	25
1st place, gold medalist(s)	Argentina	Iñaki Iriartes	1	15	25
1st place, gold medalist(s)	Germany	Lara Lessmann	1	15	25
1st place, gold medalist(s)	Germany	Evan Brandes	2	10	25
3rd place, bronze medalist(s)	Japan	Kanami Tanno	3	8	14
3rd place, bronze medalist(s)	Japan	Yuma Oshimo	4	6	14
4	Mixed-NOCs	Yeinkerly Hernández	8	1	9
4	Mixed-NOCs	Patriks Vīksna	3	8	9
5	Russia	Valeriia Pinkina	4	6	8
5	Russia	Alexander Kim	7	2	8
6	Czech Republic	Nikol Přikrylová	5	4	7
6	Czech Republic	Martin Habada	6	3	7
7	Colombia	Estefanya Echeverry	7	2	6
7	Colombia	Sebastián Martínez	5	4	6
8	Brazil	Eduarda Bordignon	6	3	4
8	Brazil	Wesley Moraes	8	1	4
