= Sebastian Schneider =

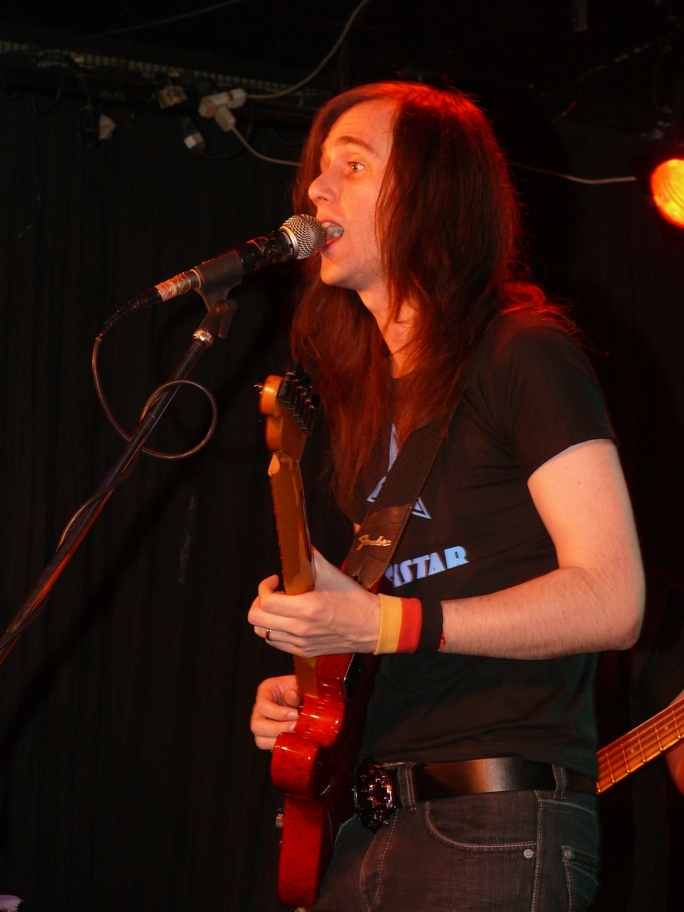
- Sebastian Schneider on stage, Enerpol Fest, 2016

Background information
- Origin: Buenos Aires, Argentina
- Genres: Rock, pop
- Occupations: Singer-songwriter, music producer, artistic director
- Instruments: Vocals, guitar, bass, keyboard, banjo
- Years active: 2000–present
- Labels: HyA, Avarecords, Warner/Chappell, Like It!, TripleRRR
- Website: http://www.sebastianschneiderweb.com

Sebastian Schneider is a German Argentine guitar player, multi-instrumentalist, singer-songwriter and music producer. He began his career in the Argentine and Latin American rock scene playing in several rock bands and later began his solo career in 2004.

== Early life and training ==
Sebastian Schneider (who took his mother's maiden name) was born in Buenos Aires, Argentina, from a German descendant mother and a Basque descendant father. He grew up in the Palermo neighbourhood of Buenos Aires. At the age of five, his grandmother Florencia gave him his first guitar, an acoustic nylon guitar. He began his musical studies at Carlos Guastavino Conservatory, where he studied classical music, tango and Argentine folklore. He performed in concerts at conservatory and private events. At age eleven, despite his parents' persistence, he decided to give up all his musical activities. Schneider later explained that he was bored of playing the acoustic guitar, but his parents wouldn't let him play the electric guitar until he'd mastered the acoustic guitar.

In 1997, he resumed his guitar studies, and joined a private academy sponsored by Yamaha. Using a Squier Standard Telecaster given to him by his parents, he learned popular styles like rock, blues, and jazz. During this time he began to form several bands, leading and composing songs for them as a vocalist and rhythm guitarist.

Schneider was uncomfortable with the pick, and preferred to play rhythm guitar on songs. While studying country music he learned of a number of guitarists who played complex musical licks and riffs using fingerpicking techniques. He became influenced by the playing style of Chet Atkins and Mark Knopfler. "I wanted to have a more active position with the guitar, and I had discovered great artists like Mark Knopfler who had successfully be singers and lead guitars playing without a pick. Then I told myself: This is what I needed to from the start!".

Schneider began to develop his particular technique, self-described as a "travesty of Knopfler's technique", using four fingers like many classical guitarists so that he could perform licks and riffs at a higher velocity. While performing as a solo artist at a private event in 2004, he was reunited with Horacio Ascheri (an old friend of his father), leader of the Argentine band The Pick Ups, who encouraged him to start a solo career.

Schneider also took interest in the sciences, studying Physics at the Universidad de Buenos Aires.

== Career ==
=== (2004–2006) Canción Para Nadie ===
Schneider recorded his first studio album, Canción Para Nadie, with Ascheri as producer. It was released by HyA Records in 2005, and its five-minute single "Haciendo Fuego" aired on radio, particularly in the Buenos Aires province. He promoted the album through several area concerts and his first radio interviews. After several personal conflicts which include the passing of his mother, he stopped performing and focused on writing material for a second album.

=== (2006–2009) Una Vida Más – First international tour ===
His second album, Una Vida Más, was released in early 2007 by Avarecords. and was also published by Warner/Chappell Music. It had more of a pop sound than the more guitar-driven, rock sound of the first one. The album's single, "Dame", received considerable airplay and was used in television advertising. Schneider's popularity also grew on the Internet, notably on MySpace social network. A video for "Dame" aired on CM music channel and internationally in other TV channels around Latin America. In late 2008, he made a promotional tour of several Latin American countries and conducted numerous TV, radio and press interviews. Guitarristas magazine noted that this album raised Schneider to international attention.

=== (2009–2010) Me voy a escapar... (Part I) ===
Between August and October 2009, Schneider wrote over 50 songs, selecting 14 for a two-part concept album. He released the first 6 tracks as an EP titled Me voy a escapar... (Parte I) in December 2009. This album was first performed at Teatro Liberarte in Buenos Aires, Schneider's first major venue in Argentina. Then he went on performing a number of shows and tours before returning to the studio in early 2010.

=== (2010–2013) ... Y ser diferente (Part II) ===
In June, he released the second installment, ...Y ser diferente (Parte II), consisting of 8 tracks including his first English-language recordings, which include two songs of his own authoring and a cover song, "Smoke gets in your eyes" a song perhaps best known by the performance of The Platters. The release concert was held on August 28 at Luna Park, one of the biggest indoor venues in Buenos Aires. After this concert Schneider takes a break from live music, returning to live shows in 2011.

=== (2013–2015) Something strange happened here – First Argentina Tour ===
From 2013 on Schneider started working on a new album, this time a double album featuring songs in Spanish and English. Meanwhile, he embarked on his first tour in 2014 in Argentina, visiting several cities in Chaco Province. This tour is declared as a Cultural Interest by the Chamber of Deputies of the Chaco Province. In 2015, he released No lo esperamos/Something strange happened here, the aforementioned album with fourteen original songs both in Spanish and English and a cover, Michael Jackson's "Billie Jean". The release concert was held at Hard Rock Café Buenos Aires.

=== (2015–2018) Second international tour and "Hippie SIN Obra Social" ===
Having performed his new album in several venues around Buenos Aires, Schneider embarked on his second international tour headlining "Enerpol Fest" in Bolivia. He performed in Bolivia and three Argentinian provinces: Jujuy, Salta and Chaco, producing a documentary about the tour called "Hippie SIN Obra Social" (Hippie WITHOUT Health Insurance), a pun on a popular meme in Argentina by the time. Back from the tour, Schneider kept performing around Buenos Aires and by the end of 2017 started working on his next album.

=== (2018 – 2020) Pornovolar ===
During the period between December 2017 – May 2018 Schneider produced a new album titled Pornovolar. It consists in fourteen revisited songs from his early work except No lo esperamos/Something strange happened here. The album was released by the label TripleRRR and the release concert is held at Fusion Bar in Buenos Aires. It was Schneider's first album since the first one where aside few special guests, musicians other than himself (his stable live band) recorded the instruments.

=== (2020 - Current) Son of The Sun - Relocation to Europe ===
Shortly before the beginning of the COVID-19 pandemic, Schneider relocated to Germany to continue with his musical career. In 2023, he started performing in the Black Forest region and surroundings. In 2024, he started working on his next album "Son of the Sun". Its first single "Keep Them Waiting" was released on September 15th, 2024, whereas the full album release is set for October 15th, 2024.

== Personal life ==
Sebastian Schneider has always been reluctant to speak about his personal life. In 2004 he lost his mother in a car accident which affected him profoundly, adopting this posture since then. He is a polyglot, being a Spanish native speaker, proficient in English and also speaking German and Italian.

Schneider is also an electronics technician and sound engineer. Aside from his first album, he made the arrangements and performed every instrument for his studio recordings, and on his third album he did all the recording, mixing and mastering.

== Musical style and equipment ==
Schneider owns several guitars and regularly performs with his Fender James Burton Telecaster and Ibanez AR520HFM-LBB, as well as digital FX either via pedals or laptop-programmed.

He has been influenced by rock and pop artists from every era, including Elvis Presley, The Beatles, Pink Floyd, Roy Orbison, Guns N' Roses, Brian Setzer, Foo Fighters, Living Colour, David Bowie and many others from the classical rock period, as well as artists from the 2000s indie rock such as The Strokes, Arctic Monkeys, The Killers and others.

He is a tenor with a wide vocal register and a soft voice, which contrasts between the distorted electric sound of his songs. His lyrics often have an abstract theme, allowing different interpretations. His music is a fusion of elements from country music, blues, flamenco, and bossa nova with a rock and pop foundation.

Schneider is a fingerstyle guitarist and rarely uses a plectrum. His technique consists in using the first four fingers of his right hand, instead of three or five fingers which are most commonly used. An important part of his style is to play riffs and licks on the guitar while singing at the same time as opposed to performing rhythm guitar.

== Discography ==
Title	Released	Label	Tracklist
Canción Para Nadie	2005	HyA Records	Haciendo Fuego" – "Vicky" – "Luna Amarilla" – "No Sé Por Qué" – "Lo Que Pasa Downtown" – "Pisando El Aire" – "Para Poderte Ver" – "Rock De Los Compases Perdidos" – "Media Solución/Viejos Papeles" – "Cabashito" – "Canción Para Nadie"
Una Vida Más	2007	AvaRecords/ Warner Chappell	"Dame" – "La Misma Sensación" – "A Toda Hora" – "Juego Cruel" – "Lejos" – "Camino Al Sol" – "Mi Diamante" – "Luz" – "Calavera" – "Cuando Se Van" – "Tu Lugar" – "Somos Nada" – "1985" – "Ecos"
Me Voy A Escapar... (Part I)	2009	Like It!	"Me voy a escapar" – "Hojas" – "Es una visión" – "Tengo dos" – "El otro lado" – "Demos vuelta"
...Y Ser Diferente (Part II)	2010	Like It!	"Hoy es hoy" – "Hola" – "4 A.M." – "Me lo quedo yo" – "Sur del sur" – "Not better" – "Todavía necesito la furia" – "Smoke Gets in Your Eyes"
No Lo Esperamos/ Something Strange Happened Here	2015	Like It!	"No" – "Como un sueño" – "A ella le gusta mirar" – "Nos encontramos" – "No tengo tiempo" – "Mientras duermen" – "Quién soy" // "Leather Soul" – "Go, we're having a good time" – "It doesn't pay the rent" – "Something strange happened here" – "The story" – "Even if it falls" – "Billie Jean" – "Because we want to"
Pornovolar	2018	TripleRRR	"Demos Vuelta" – "Dame" – "Hojas" – "Mi Diamante" – "Haciendo Fuego" – "Calavera" – "Hola" – "Cabashito" – "Es Una Visión" – "Somos Nada" – "Pisando El Aire" – "Hoy Es Hoy"
