= Agustina Roth =

Argentine BMX rider (born 2001)

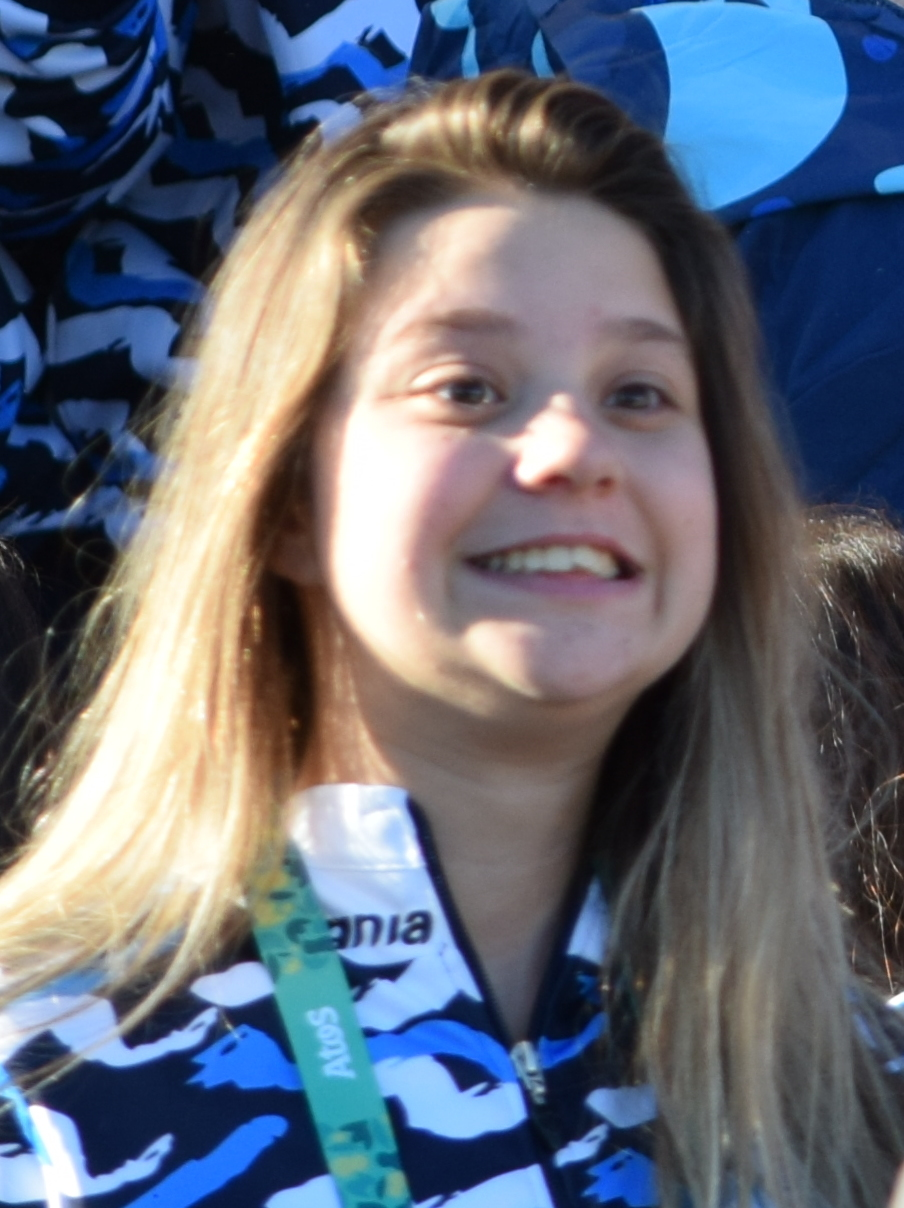
- Roth at the 2018 Youth Olympics

Personal information
- Born: July 18, 2001 (age 24)

Sport
- Country: Argentina
Medal record
Pan American Games
Bronze medal – third place	2019 Lima	Freestyle
Summer Youth Olympics
Gold medal – first place	2018 Buenos Aires	Freestyle

Agustina Roth (born 18 July 2001) is an Argentine BMX rider.

Roth competed at the 2018 Youth Olympics where she won a gold medal in the mixed BMX freestyle park event. She won a bronze medal at the Cycling at the 2019 Pan American Games in the women's BMX freestyle event.
