= Matías Leichner =

Argentine footballer

Personal information
- Date of birth: 2 July 1987 (age 39)
- Place of birth: Córdoba, Argentina
- Height: 1.76 m (5 ft 9 in)
- Position: Forward

Team information
- Current team: Talleres de Berrotaran

Senior career*
Years	Team	Apps	(Gls)
2008	Talleres de Perico	9	(0)
2009–2011	General Paz Juniors		
2011–2012	Complejo Deportivo	23	(6)
2012	Naval	12	(5)
2013	Atenas Río Cuarto		
2013–2014	Alianza Coronel Moldes	23	(3)
2014–2015	9 de Julio	16	(2)
2015	Mitre	5	(0)
2016	Atenas Río Cuarto		
2017	Racing de Córdoba	12	(3)
2018–2021	Argentino Peñarol	15	(5)
2022–2023	General Paz Juniors		
2023–	Talleres de Berrotaran	–	(–)
- * Club domestic league appearances and goals

Matías Leichner (born 2 July 1987, in Córdoba, Argentina) is an Argentine professional footballer who plays for Talleres de Berrotaran of the Argentine Liga Riotercerense.

== Teams ==
- (Argentina) Talleres de Perico 2008
- (Argentina) General Paz Juniors 2009–2011
- (Argentina) Complejo Deportivo 2011–2012
- (Chile) Naval 2012
- (Argentina) Atenas de Río Cuarto 2013
- (Argentina) Alianza Coronel Moldes 2013–2014
- (Argentina) 9 de Julio 2014–2015
- (Argentina) Mitre 2015
- (Argentina) Atenas Río Cuarto 2016
- (Argentina) Racing de Córdoba 2017
- (Argentina) Argentino Peñarol 2018–2021
- (Argentina) General Paz Juniors 2022–2023
- (Argentina) Talleres de Berrotaran 2023–

== Personal life ==
His older brother, Christian, is a former footballer and they coincided in Chilean club Naval in 2012.
