= Masters M60 discus world record progression =

Masters M60 discus world record progression is the progression of world record improvements of the discus M60 division of Masters athletics. Records must be set in properly conducted, official competitions under the standing IAAF rules unless modified by World Masters Athletics. The M60 division consists of male athletes who have reached the age of 60 but have not yet reached the age of 65, so exactly from their 60th birthday to the day before their 65th birthday. The M60 division throws a 1 kg implement.

Key

Incomplete information Pending

| Distance | Athlete | Nationality | Birthdate | Location | Date |
|---|---|---|---|---|---|
| 66.36 | Klaus Liedtke | Germany | 05.01.1941 | Schwerte | 19.05.2001 |
| 65.40 | Klaus Albers | Germany | 12.01.1940 | Beverstedt | 03.09.2000 |
| 60.56 | Peter Speckens | Germany | 28.05.1935 | Wuppertal | 29.09.1996 |
| 58.96 | Enrique Helf | Argentina | 09.08.1932 | Zorneding | 16.04.1994 |
| 57.86 | Carmelo Rado | Italy | 04.08.1933 | Biella | 14.09.1993 |
| 57.60 | Wendell Palmer | United States | 22.04.1932 | Texas | 24.04.1992 |
| 57.06 | Kauko Jouppila | Finland | 03.03.1921 | Strasbourg | 16.07.1982 |
| 53.42 | Konstantin Maksimczyk | United Kingdom | 10.06.1914 | Bristol | 08.06.1978 |
