= Oscar Kühnemann =

Argentine botanist (1911–1999)

- Born: 22 December 1911
- Died: 24 December 1999 (aged 88)
- Citizenship: Argentina
- Education: University of Buenos Aires
- Known for: Marine botany
- Scientific career
- Fields: Botany
- Workplaces: University of Buenos Aires; Bernardino Rivadavia Natural Sciences Argentine Museum
- Author abbrev. (botany): Kühnem.

Oscar Kühnemann (22 December 1911 – 24 December 1999) was an Argentine botanist dedicated to the study of cryptogams and phycology. He was awarded a Guggenheim Fellowship in 1958 for his research. The standard author abbreviation Kühnem. is used to indicate this person as the author when citing a botanical name.

== Career ==
Kühnemann attended the University of Buenos Aires. He studied cryptogams under Alberto Castellanos, and took part in several collection expeditions around Argentina. He performed research for his doctoral thesis while working at the Bernardino Rivadavia Natural Sciences Argentine Museum. He earned his doctorate from the university in 1938.

Kühnemann continued his work as a professor at his alma mater until 1966. In 1958, he was brought on at National Scientific and Technical Research Council (CONICET) as a researcher specializing in algae. He was a leader figure in the formation of the Centro de Investigaciones en Biología Marina, where he remained as director until 1984. Kühnemann was also a founding member of the Latin American Phycological Society (Spanish: Asociacion Latinamericana de Ficologia) in 1962.

== Awards and legacy ==
He received the National Prize from the Commission of Culture for Biological Sciences (Comisión de Cultura para las Ciencias Biológicas) in 1944. He was awarded a Guggenheim Fellowship in 1958 for his research in plant science.

== Personal life ==
Kühnemann had three children. He died in 1999.
