= Carcarañá =

- City
- Location of Carcarañá in Argentina
- Coordinates: 32°51′S 61°09′W
- Country: Argentina
- Province: Santa Fe
- Department: San Lorenzo

Government
  - Intendant: Miguel Angel Vázquez (PJ)

Area
  - Total: 145 km^{2} (56 sq mi)

Population (2010 census)
  - Total: 15,619
  - Density: 108/km^{2} (279/sq mi)
- Time zone: UTC−3 (ART)
- CPA base: S2138
- Dialing code: +54 341

Carcarañá is a city in the province of Santa Fe, Argentina, located in the San Lorenzo Department, on the southern banks of the Carcarañá River, 47 km (29 mi) west of Rosario on National Route 9, and 196 km (122 mi) south of the provincial capital. As of the 2010 census [INDEC] it has about 22,000 inhabitants. Carcarañá was founded in 1870 and attained the status of comuna (commune) on 10 December 1890. It is the birthplace of Mario Luis Bautista Maulión, José Ernesto Sosa, Claudio Yacob, and Germán Lux.
