= León Strembel =

Argentine footballer

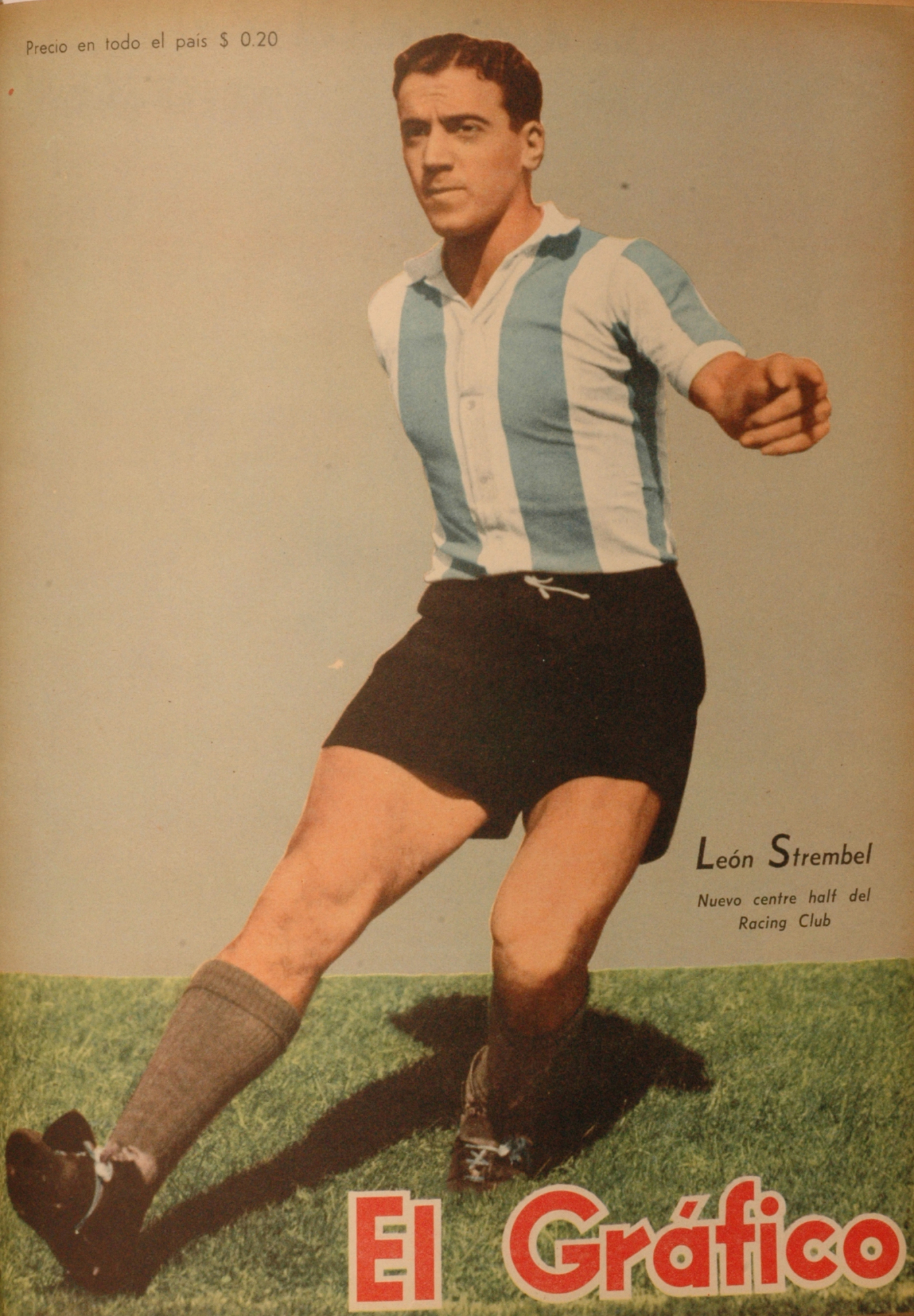
- Strembel in 1945.

Personal information
- Full name: León Strembel
- Place of birth: Argentina
- Position: Midfielder

Senior career*
Years	Team	Apps	(Gls)
1939–1944	Lanús	228	(6)
1945–1946	Racing	64	(3)
1947	Atlanta	12	(0)
1948–1956	Lanús		

International career
	Argentina	5	(0)
- * Club domestic league appearances and goals

León Strembel was an Argentine professional football midfielder.

Strembel began his career with Club Atlético Lanús in 1939. He played for the club until 1944, before joining Racing Club de Avellaneda from 1945 to 1946. He also played for the Argentina national football team, appbearing in the South American Championship 1946.

In 1947 he joined Club Atlético Atlanta along with other prominent players such as José Soriano and Adolfo Pedernera as they attempted to build a super team. The project did not work out well with Atlanta suffering relegation at the end of the season. Strembel returned to Lanús for the following season where he played until his retirement in 1956.
