= José Soriano (footballer) =

Peruvian footballer (1917-2011)

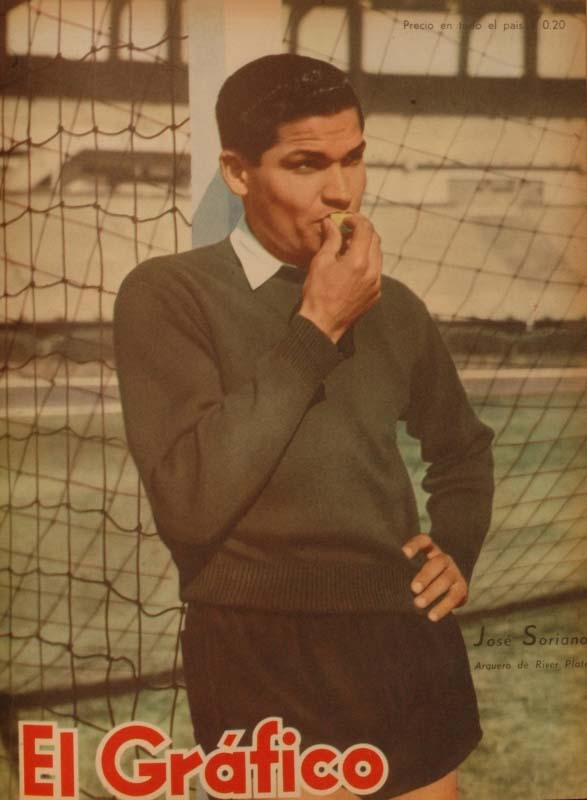

Personal information
- Full name: José Eusebio Soriano Barco
- Date of birth: 17 April 1917
- Place of birth: Chiclayo, Peru
- Date of death: 22 March 2011 (aged 93)
- Place of death: Buenos Aires, Argentina
- Position: Goalkeeper

Youth career
- ?–1940: Alfonso Ugarte

Senior career*
Years	Team	Apps	(Gls)
1940–1942	Alfonso Ugarte		
1942–1943	Banfield	46	(0)
1944–1946	River Plate	71	(0)
1947	Atlanta	10	(0)

International career
1942	Peru	1	(0)
- * Club domestic league appearances and goals

José Eusebio Soriano Barco (17 April 1917 – 22 March 2011) was a Peruvian football goalkeeper who played for the Peru national team and spent most of his career in the Argentine league. He was the last surviving member of the legendary River Plate team known as "la máquina" (the machine).

== Early life ==
José Soriano was born on 17 April 1917 in Chiclayo, Peru. He began his playing career in 1940 with Alfonso Ugarte de Chiclín of Trujillo nicknamed "los diablos rojos" (the red devils). His good displays attracted the attention of several of the biggest teams in Peru such as Universitario and Alianza Lima and he played one game for the Peru national team without ever having played in the Peruvian top flight.

== Playing in Argentina ==
After a number of strong performances at the 1942 South American Championship he attracted international attention and was signed up by Banfield of Argentina. He played 46 games for "el taladro" (the drill) between 1942 and his leaving the club in 1944 to join Argentine giants River Plate.

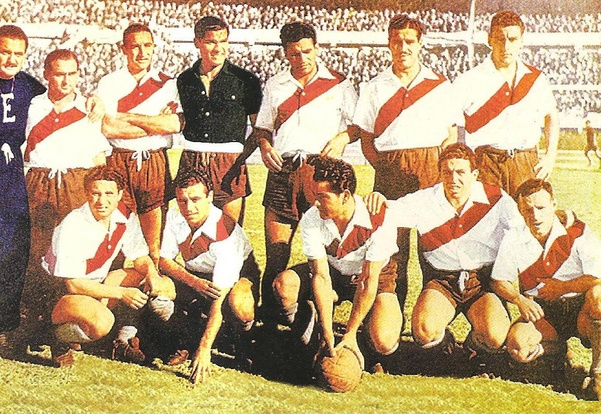
Soriano in black, the goalkeeper and captain of River Plate's 1945 championship winning team

He was signed by River Plate alongside three other players (Vaschetto, Fachetti and another goalkeeper Besuzzo). he played 71 league games for River Plate in the legendary team nicknamed "la Máquina" (the machine). His teammates included Adolfo Pedernera, José Manuel Moreno, Ángel Labruna, Félix Loustau and "Pipo" Rossi. The Peruvian goalkeeper was well liked and was considered one of the true gentlemen of the game. He was made the captain of River Plate and in 1945 he led them to the Primera División championship. During his time as a River Plate player the directors of the Argentina national team offered him the chance to play for the Argentina national team but he declined the offer.

In 1947 he joined Atlanta who were ambitiously trying to build a dream team. The team included other star players from the Primera División including Adolfo Pedernera, León Strembel and Higinio García but they did not perform well suffering relegation at the end of the 1947 season prompting Soriano's early retirement from the game.

== Later life ==
After his retirement as a player he continued his involvement with football, he was an important early figure in the Futbolistas Argentinos Agremiados (Argentine players union) and had a role in the organisation of the 1948 strike which resulted in the departure of a number of players to play in Colombia during the era of "dorado colombiano" (Colombian gold). Soriano rejected offers to come out of retirement from several Colombian clubs such as Millonarios, América de Cali and Cúcuta Deportivo deciding instead to set himself up as a businessman.

Despite having never played in the Peruvian top flight Soriano is considered one of the greatest Peruvian goalkeepers of all time and is also fondly remembered as one of the great River Plate goalkeepers. He died in a Buenos Aires clinic on 22 March 2011 at the age of 93 after several days of treatment after breaking his hip in a fall.

== Titles ==
River Plate

- Primera División (1): 1945
