= Christian Leichner =

Argentine footballer

Personal information
- Full name: Christian Leichner
- Date of birth: 11 March 1982 (age 44)
- Place of birth: Córdoba, Argentina
- Height: 1.78 m (5 ft 10 in)
- Position: Forward

Senior career*
Years	Team	Apps	(Gls)
2002–2003	Racing de Córdoba		
2004–2005	Universitario de Córdoba		
2005	Deportivo Maipú	5	(0)
2006	Escuela Presidente Roca		
2006	9 de Julio RT	13	(1)
2007	Sportivo Patria	14	(5)
2007–2008	Talleres de Perico	30	(10)
2008–2009	General Paz Juniors		
2009–2010	Unión Sunchales	63	(20)
2011	Sport Huancayo	0	(0)
2011	Sportivo Belgrano		
2011	Gimnasia de Mendoza	3	(0)
2012	Naval	23	(10)
2013	Tiro Federal Morteros	11	(3)
2014	Sportivo Del Bono	8	(0)
- * Club domestic league appearances and goals

Christian Leichner (born March 11, 1982, in Córdoba, Argentina) is an Argentine former football forward.

== Teams ==
- (Argentina) Racing de Córdoba 2002–2003
- (Argentina) Universitario de Córdoba 2004–2005
- (Argentina) Deportivo Maipú 2005
- (Argentina) Escuela Presidente Roca 2006
- (Argentina) 9 de Julio de Río Tercero 2006
- (Argentina) Sportivo Patria 2007
- (Argentina) Talleres de Perico 2007–2008
- (Argentina) General Paz Juniors 2008–2009
- (Argentina) Unión de Sunchales 2009–2010
- (Peru) Sport Huancayo 2011
- (Argentina) Sportivo Belgrano 2011
- (Argentina) Gimnasia y Esgrima de Mendoza 2011
- (Chile) Naval 2012
- (Argentina) Tiro Federal Morteros 2013
- (Argentina) Sportivo Del Bono 2014

== Personal life ==
His younger brother, Matías, is also a footballer and they coincided in Chilean club Naval in 2012.
