= Rodolfo Zagert =

Argentinian painter and architect

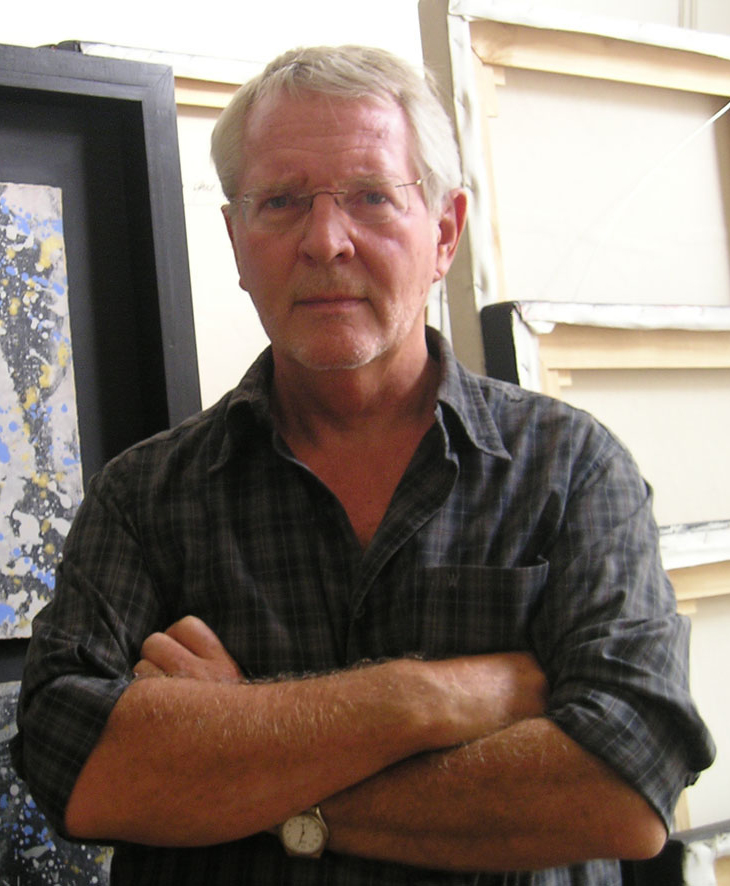
Rodolfo Zagert in his studio in Buenos Aires, 2008

Rodolfo Zagert is an Argentinian painter and architect. He first studied art and architecture in Buenos Aires and later continued his studies in (Germany), where he got a scholarship. In 1991 he moved to Palma de Mallorca, his architectural work focusing on historic building restoration. For one project, the restoration of a sixteenth-century palace, he was awarded the Premio Ciudad de Palma in 1999. In his art work he uses mixed techniques, on paper or canvas.

His first exhibition as a painter was in 1969 at the age of 19. His work has been featured in exhibitions from then until the present (2016).
