= 1959 South American Junior Championships in Athletics =

I South American Junior Championships in Athletics
- Dates: April 18–19
- Host city: Buenos Aires, Argentina
- Level: U21
- Events: 17
- Participation: about 59 athletes from 2 nations

The first South American Junior Championships in Athletics were held in Buenos Aires, Argentina from April 18–19, 1959.

== Participation (unofficial) ==
Detailed result lists can be found on the "World Junior Athletics History" website. An unofficial count yields the number of about 59 athletes from about 2 countries: Argentina (28), Chile (31).

== Medal summary ==
Medal winners are published. Complete results can be found on the "World Junior Athletics History" website.

=== Men ===
| Event | Gold | | Silver | | Bronze | |
|---|---|---|---|---|---|---|
| 100 metres | Eduardo Krumm (CHI) | 10.7 | Hervé Dillhan (CHI) | 10.9 | Alberto Keitel (CHI) | 10.9 |
| 200 metres | Hervé Dillhan (CHI) | 22.2 | Juan Salom (ARG) | 22.7 | Juan Mouat (CHI) | 22.8 |
| 400 metres | Fernando Zapeda (CHI) | 51.1 | Juan Carlos Dyrzka (ARG) | 51.7 | Jordi Radmilovic (CHI) | 51.9 |
| 800 metres | Ernesto Díaz (CHI) | 1:58.8 | Mario Luengo (CHI) | 2:00.1 | Carlos Crespo (ARG) | 2:01.6 |
| 1500 metres | Daniel Cortez (CHI) | 4:07.1 | Enrique Rodríguez (CHI) | 4:09.7 | Dagoberto Hernández (CHI) | 4:12.4 |
| 3000 metres | Enrique Rodríguez (CHI) | 9:05.8 | Isay Ramírez (CHI) | 9:06.0 | Daniel Cortez (CHI) | 9:06.2 |
| 110 metres hurdles | Juan Carlos Dyrzka (ARG) | 16.0 | Jorge Wagner (ARG) | 16.1 | Guillermo Vallanía (ARG) | 16.3 |
| 4 × 100 metres relay | Chile; Juan Mouat; Andrés Larraín; Hervé Dillhan; Eduardo Krumm | 42.9 | Only one finishing team | | | |
| 1000 metres Medley relay (100m x 200m x 300m x 400m) | Chile; Fernando Zapeda; Jordi Radmilovic; Hervé Dillhan; Juan Mouat | 2:02.2 | Argentina; Juan Carlos Dyrzka; Félix Gallardo; Juan Salom; Carlos San Martín | 2:03.4 | Only 2 starting teams | |
| High jump | Eugenio Velasco (CHI) | 1.80 | José Ugarte (CHI) | 1.75 | Julio Verno (ARG) | 1.75 |
| Pole vault | Sergio Opazo (CHI) | 3.60 | Germán Goddard (CHI) | 3.50 | Luis Meza (CHI) | 3.50 |
| Long jump | Carlos Tornquist (CHI) | 6.74 | Eduardo Krumm (CHI) | 6.56 | Jorge Wagner (ARG) | 6.29 |
| Shot put | Horacio Beluardo (ARG) | 16.53 | Juan Faist (ARG) | 15.49 | Leonardo Lee (CHI) | 15.44 |
| Discus throw | Orlando Guaita (CHI) | 40.86 | Horacio Beluardo (ARG) | 39.41 | Juan Faist (ARG) | 38.40 |
| Hammer throw | Juan Miranda (CHI) | 49.80 | Héctor Núñez (CHI) | 49.23 | Mario Cáceras (CHI) | 45.83 |
| Javelin throw | Claudio Reinke (ARG) | 52.55 | Juan Pacella (ARG) | 47.37 | Alberto Kraeft (ARG) | 46.89 |
| Pentathlon | Eduardo Krumm (CHI) | 2122 | Domingo Valenzuela (CHI) | 1901 | Werner Wischia (CHI) | 1884 |

== Medal table (unofficial) ==
* Host nation (Argentina)

| Rank | Nation | Gold | Silver | Bronze | Total |
|---|---|---|---|---|---|
| 1 | Chile (CHI) | 14 | 9 | 9 | 32 |
| 2 | Argentina (ARG)* | 3 | 7 | 6 | 16 |
| Totals (2 entries) | | 17 | 16 | 15 | 48 |
