= Sergio Schulmeister =

Argentine footballer

Personal information
- Full name: Sergio Pedro Schulmeister
- Date of birth: 30 April 1977
- Place of birth: Coronel Suárez, Argentina
- Date of death: 4 February 2003 (aged 25)
- Place of death: Buenos Aires, Argentina
- Position: Goalkeeper

Senior career*
Years	Team	Apps	(Gls)
1997–1999	Defensores de Belgrano		
1999–2001	San Miguel		
2001–2002	Atlético Rafaela		
2002–2003	Huracán		
- * Club domestic league appearances and goals

Sergio Schulmeister (30 April 1977 – 4 February 2003) was an Argentine footballer who played as goalkeeper in some clubs in the Argentine Primera División.

He committed suicide by hanging on 4 February 2003, after surviving a first attempt on 25 September 2001.
