= Germán Lux =

Argentine footballer

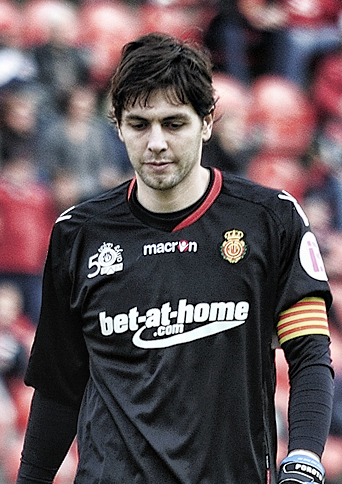
- Lux with Mallorca in 2011

Personal information
- Full name: Germán Darío Lux
- Date of birth: 7 June 1982 (age 44)
- Place of birth: Carcarañá, Argentina
- Height: 1.86 m (6 ft 1 in)
- Position: Goalkeeper

Youth career
- 1998–2001: River Plate

Senior career*
| Years | Team | Apps | (Gls) |
| 2001–2007 | River Plate | 54 | (0) |
| 2007–2011 | Mallorca | 29 | (0) |
| 2011–2017 | Deportivo La Coruña | 106 | (0) |
| 2017–2021 | River Plate | 12 | (0) |
| Total | | 201 | (0) |

International career
| 2001 | Argentina U20 | 5 | (0) |
| 2004 | Argentina Olympic | 9 | (0) |
| 2005 | Argentina | 6 | (0) |
Medal record
Representing Argentina
Men's Football
Olympic Games
| Gold medal – first place | 2004 Athens | Team competition |
- * Club domestic league appearances and goals

Germán Darío Lux (born 7 June 1982) is an Argentine former professional footballer who played as a goalkeeper.

After starting out at River Plate, he spent most of his career in Spain with Mallorca and Deportivo.

== Club career ==
=== River Plate ===
Lux was born in Carcarañá, Santa Fe Province. Nicknamed Poroto, he joined Club Atlético River Plate's youth system aged 16, and made his Primera División debut in 2001. Shortly after, he became first choice.

In the 2006 Apertura, Lux lost his job to emergent talent Juan Pablo Carrizo and, a few months after, was cut from the squad by coach Daniel Passarella. In the beginning of the year he also lost his brother, who committed suicide.

=== Mallorca ===
Lux signed a four-year deal with RCD Mallorca for 2007–08, as a backup to youth graduate Miguel Ángel Moyá, but benefitted from an injury to the latter to appear in ten La Liga matches during the season. In his second year, the same occurred: Moyá was again downed with physical problems and Lux was promoted to starter, but lost his job in January 2009 with the signing of Dudu Aouate from Deportivo de La Coruña.

=== Deportivo ===
In the following two seasons, Lux was almost exclusively restricted to Copa del Rey matches with Mallorca, only totalling five league appearances. The same fate befell him at his next club, Deportivo La Coruña, where he initially played second-fiddle to Dani Aranzubia.

Lux was again the starter in the 2013–14 campaign, as the Galicians finished runners-up in the Segunda División and subsequently returned to the top flight. Afterwards, he alternated in goal with Fabricio.

=== Return to River ===
On 26 June 2017, ten years after leaving for Europe, the 35-year-old Lux returned to River Plate on a three-year contract. In December 2021, after several years as backup to Franco Armani where he was often criticised for his performances, he announced his retirement.

== International career ==
As a starter during the 2004 Summer Olympics (all six matches, no goals conceded), Lux was instrumental in the gold medal triumph of the Argentina national team, who scored 17. He made his full debut on 9 March 2005 in a 1–1 friendly draw against Mexico, as manager José Pékerman only fielded players based in the Argentine league.

Lux was also first-choice in the 2005 FIFA Confederations Cup for the runners-up. He was left out of the squad for the 2006 FIFA World Cup in Germany, however, and Oscar Ustari was picked instead.

== Personal life ==
Lux's older brother, Javier, was also a footballer.

== Career statistics ==
Appearances and goals by club, season and competition
| Club | Season | League | | | Cup | | Continental | | Total | |
| Club | Season | Division | Apps | Goals | Apps | Goals | Apps | Goals | Apps | Goals |
|---|---|---|---|---|---|---|---|---|---|---|
| River Plate | 2001–02 | Primera División | 3 | 0 | — | | 0 | 0 | 3 | 0 |
| River Plate | 2003–04 | Primera División | 15 | 0 | — | | 2 | 0 | 17 | 0 |
| River Plate | 2004–05 | Primera División | 6 | 0 | — | | 4 | 0 | 10 | 0 |
| River Plate | 2005–06 | Primera División | 28 | 0 | — | | 10 | 0 | 38 | 0 |
| River Plate | 2006–07 | Primera División | 2 | 0 | — | | 2 | 0 | 4 | 0 |
| River Plate | Total | | 54 | 0 | — | | 18 | 0 | 72 | 0 |
| Mallorca | 2007–08 | La Liga | 10 | 0 | 4 | 0 | — | | 14 | 0 |
| Mallorca | 2008–09 | La Liga | 14 | 0 | 3 | 0 | — | | 17 | 0 |
| Mallorca | 2009–10 | La Liga | 1 | 0 | 4 | 0 | — | | 5 | 0 |
| Mallorca | 2010–11 | La Liga | 4 | 0 | 4 | 0 | — | | 8 | 0 |
| Mallorca | Total | | 29 | 0 | 15 | 0 | — | | 44 | 0 |
| Deportivo La Coruña | 2011–12 | Segunda División | 4 | 0 | 4 | 0 | — | | 8 | 0 |
| Deportivo La Coruña | 2012–13 | La Liga | 4 | 0 | 2 | 0 | — | | 6 | 0 |
| Deportivo La Coruña | 2013–14 | Segunda División | 37 | 0 | 0 | 0 | — | | 37 | 0 |
| Deportivo La Coruña | 2014–15 | La Liga | 7 | 0 | 2 | 0 | — | | 9 | 0 |
| Deportivo La Coruña | 2015–16 | La Liga | 29 | 0 | 0 | 0 | — | | 29 | 0 |
| Deportivo La Coruña | 2016–17 | La Liga | 25 | 0 | 0 | 0 | — | | 25 | 0 |
| Deportivo La Coruña | Total | | 106 | 0 | 8 | 0 | — | | 114 | 0 |
| River Plate | 2016–17 | Primera División | 0 | 0 | 3 | 0 | 3 | 0 | 6 | 0 |
| River Plate | 2017–18 | Primera División | 7 | 0 | 2 | 0 | 2 | 0 | 11 | 0 |
| River Plate | 2018–19 | Primera División | 5 | 0 | 1 | 0 | 2 | 0 | 8 | 0 |
| River Plate | 2019–20 | Primera División | 0 | 0 | 0 | 0 | 1 | 0 | 1 | 0 |
| River Plate | 2020–21 | Primera División | 0 | 0 | 0 | 0 | 0 | 0 | 0 | 0 |
| River Plate | Total | | 12 | 0 | 6 | 0 | 8 | 0 | 26 | 0 |
| Career total | | | 201 | 0 | 29 | 0 | 26 | 0 | 256 | 0 |

== Honours ==
River Plate

- Argentine Primera División: 2002 Clausura, 2004 Clausura
- Copa Libertadores: 2018
- Recopa Sudamericana: 2019

Deportivo

- Segunda División: 2011–12

Argentina

- FIFA U-20 World Cup: 2001
- Summer Olympic Games: 2004
- CONMEBOL Pre-Olympic Tournament: 2004
