= Alfredo Resler =

Argentine footballer (born 1992)

Personal information
- Full name: Alfredo Gastón Resler
- Date of birth: 7 June 1992 (age 34)
- Place of birth: Juan José Castelli, Argentina
- Height: 1.82 m (6 ft 0 in)
- Position: Centre-back

Team information
- Current team: Defensores Unidos

Youth career
- Rosario Central

Senior career*
Years	Team	Apps	(Gls)
2013–2014	Rosario Central	0	(0)
2013–2014	→ Tiro Federal (loan)	9	(0)
2015–2018	Central Córdoba	76	(10)
2018–	Defensores Unidos	33	(0)
- * Club domestic league appearances and goals as of 00:18, 17 May 2019 (UTC)

Alfredo Gastón Resler (born 7 June 1992) is an Argentine professional footballer who plays as a centre-back for Defensores Unidos.

== Career ==
Rosario Central were Resler's opening senior team. He didn't appear competitively for the club, though was loaned out in July 2013 to Torneo Argentino A's Tiro Federal. Nine appearances came in 2013–14. January 2015 saw Resler leave, signing for Central Córdoba of Primera C Metropolitana. He would appear in seventy-six fixtures and score ten goals in three years with them. In June 2018, Resler moved to Primera B Metropolitana side Defensores Unidos. After being an unused substitute for Copa Argentina encounters with Godoy Cruz and Newell's Old Boys, he made his debut on 2 September versus San Telmo.

== Personal life ==
Resler's brother, Fernando, is also a footballer; he mirrored Alfredo's career with Rosario Central, Tiro Federal and Central Córdoba.

== Career statistics ==
As of 17 May 2019.

Appearances and goals by club, season and competition
Club	Season	League			Cup		League Cup		Continental		Other		Total	
Club	Season	Division	Apps	Goals	Apps	Goals	Apps	Goals	Apps	Goals	Apps	Goals	Apps	Goals
Rosario Central	2013–14	Primera División	0	0	0	0	—		—		0	0	0	0
Rosario Central	2014	Primera División	0	0	0	0	—		0	0	0	0	0	0
Rosario Central	Total		0	0	0	0	—		0	0	0	0	0	0
Tiro Federal (loan)	2013–14	Torneo Argentino A	9	0	0	0	—		—		0	0	9	0
Defensores Unidos	2018–19	Primera B Metropolitana	33	0	0	0	—		—		0	0	33	0
Career total			42	0	0	0	—		0	0	0	0	42	0
