= Renate Schottelius =

German dancer and choreographer

- Renate Schottelius
- Born: 8 December 1921; Flensburg, Germany
- Died: 27 September 1998 (aged 76); Buenos Aires, Argentina
- Occupations: Dancer and choreographer

Renate Schottelius (8 December 1921 – 27 September 1998) was a German dancer and choreographer known for her work in Argentina and the United States.

== Life ==
Schottelius was born in Flensburg. Her parents moved so that she could be trained in ballet at the Berlin Opera and at the Mary Wigman School where she worked under Alice Uhlen and Ruth Abramovitz. She had to leave in 1936 because of Nazism. Her father, Professor Justus W. Schottelius, and mother chose to move to Colombia but Schottelius chose Argentina where her uncle lived. She was just 14 when she arrived and she had to take work so that she could continue to study at the National Ballet School in Buenos Aires.

She perfected with Miriam Winslow dancing between 1942 and 1947. Winslow was an important colleague. Together they toured Argentina with 18 dancers, two pianists and a drummer.

In 1953 she traveled to the United States where she studied with Martha Graham, José Limón, Hanya Holm, Agnes De Mille and other choreographers. She taught at the Boston Conservatory in the early 1970s.

Schottelius' choreographies were presented at the Teatro Presidente Alvear, Teatro San Martín, Teatro Blanca Podestá and the Teatro Astral.

She returned to Germany to visit in 1958 and lectured in Boston.

Among her most outstanding disciples, the Argentine choreographer Oscar Aráiz and Ana María Stekelman.

In 1989 she received the Konex Award – Merit Diploma as one of the best choreographers in Argentine history.

Schottelius died in 1998 in Buenos Aires.
