= Valentín Haberkon =

Argentine professional footballer

Personal information
- Date of birth: 29 July 1995 (age 31)
- Place of birth: Macachín, Argentina
- Height: 1.86 m (6 ft 1 in)
- Position: Forward

Team information
- Current team: ASD Sambiase 2023
- Number: 9

Youth career
- Independiente
- Banfield

Senior career*
Years	Team	Apps	(Gls)
2018–2019	Deportivo Español	51	(5)
2019–2020	Los Andes	9	(1)
2020–2021	FK Csíkszereda	4	(0)
2021	Rieti	2	(0)
2021	Olympia Agnonese	7	(3)
2021	Vigor Lamezia	9	(3)
2021–2022	Lamezia Terme	30	(9)
2022–2023	Puteolana	29	(2)
2023–2024	Licata	23	(2)
2024	Sancataldese Calcio	11	(0)
2024–2025	ASD Ragusa Calcio 1949	18	(5)
2025–	ASD Sambiase 2023	0	(0)
- * Club domestic league appearances and goals as of 22 February 2026

Valentín Haberkon (born 29 July 1995) is an Argentine professional footballer who plays as a forward for Serie D club ASD Sambiase 2023.

== Career ==
Haberkon played in the youth of Independiente and Banfield. In July 2017, Haberkon joined Deportivo Español of Primera B Metropolitana. His senior debut arrived in the following September in a three-goal win away to Colegiales on 9 September, which was followed by eighteen more appearances in 2017–18. He scored his first goal in his second game of 2018–19, netting in a fixture with San Miguel on 2 September 2018. Haberkon scored further versus Fénix, Almirante Brown and Defensores Unidos in the next months, before netting against the latter again in April as his club were relegated to Primera C Metropolitana.

Haberkon spent the 2019–20 campaign in Primera B Metropolitana with Los Andes, making nine appearances and scoring one goal; against San Telmo. On 2 October 2020, Haberkon headed abroad to join Romanian Liga II club FK Csíkszereda. He made his debut during a 2–1 defeat away to FC Metaloglobus București on 24 October, after he replaced András Mészáros during the interval.

== Career statistics ==
As of 24 December 2020.

Appearances and goals by club, season and competition
Club	Season	League			Cup		League Cup		Continental		Other		Total	
Club	Season	Division	Apps	Goals	Apps	Goals	Apps	Goals	Apps	Goals	Apps	Goals	Apps	Goals
Deportivo Español	2017–18	Primera B Metropolitana	19	0	0	0	—		—		0	0	19	0
Deportivo Español	2018–19	Primera B Metropolitana	32	5	0	0	—		—		0	0	32	5
Deportivo Español	Total		51	5	0	0	—		—		0	0	51	5
Los Andes	2019–20	Primera B Metropolitana	9	1	0	0	—		—		0	0	9	1
FK Csíkszereda	2020–21	Liga II	4	0	0	0	—		—		0	0	4	0
Career total			64	6	0	0	—		—		0	0	64	6
