= Franco Bechtholdt =

Argentine footballer

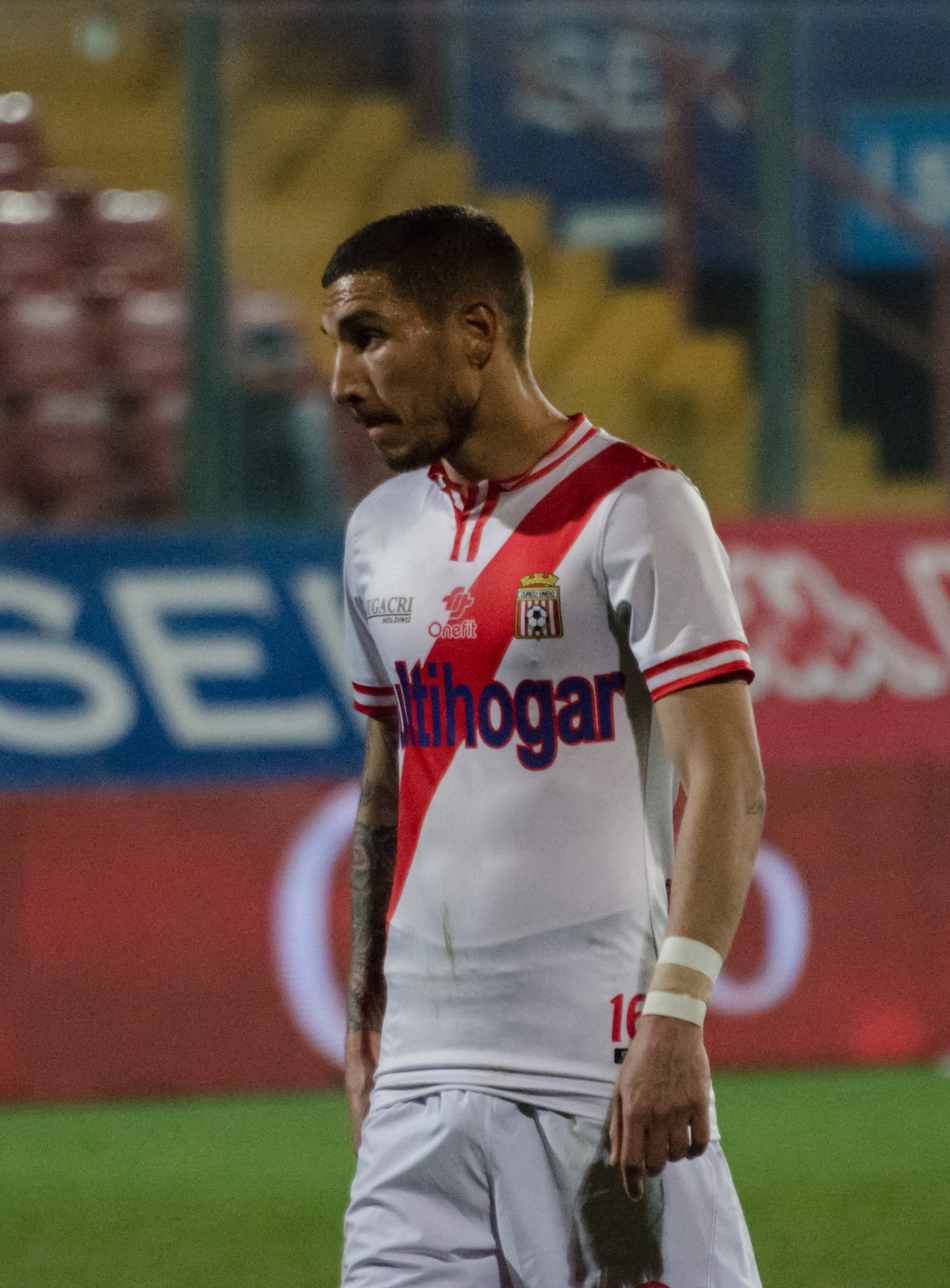
- Bechtholdt with Curicó Unido in 2018

Personal information
- Full name: Franco Bechtholdt Chervaz
- Date of birth: 15 August 1993 (age 33)
- Place of birth: Buenos Aires, Argentina
- Position: Midfielder

Team information
- Current team: Cobresal

Youth career
- Curicó Unido

Senior career*
Years	Team	Apps	(Gls)
2011–2023	Curicó Unido	267	(12)
2011	→ Defensores Belgrano (VR) (loan)	–	(–)
2024–	Cobresal	0	(0)
- * Club domestic league appearances and goals as of 4 January 2024

Franco Bechtholdt Chervaz (Note: In this Spanish name, the first or paternal surname is Bechtholdt and the second or maternal family name is Chervaz.) (born 15 August 1993), known as Franco Bechtholdt, is an Argentine-born Chilean football who plays as a midfielder for Cobresal.

== Career ==
A product of Curicó Unido youth system, Bechtholdt had a stint on loan at Argentine club Defensores de Villa Ramallo in the 2011–12 Torneo Argentino A. A historical player of Curicó Unido, he is the player with the most appearances in the club history.

In 2024, he joined Cobresal.

== Personal life ==
He is the son of the former footballer Carlos Bechtholdt and the brother of the also footballer Nicolás Bechtholdt. Born in Argentina, he came to Chile at early age when his father joined Audax Italiano in 1997 and then naturalized Chilean by residence.
