= Carlos Bechtholdt =

Argentine footballer

Personal information
- Full name: Carlos Alberto Bechtholdt Bazzano
- Date of birth: 10 July 1969 (age 57)
- Place of birth: Baradero, Buenos Aires, Argentina
- Height: 1.84 m (6 ft 0 in)
- Position: Midfielder

Senior career*
Years	Team	Apps	(Gls)
1993–1994	Defensores Unidos		
1994–1995	Victoria		
1996	Deportivo Quito		
1997–1999	Audax Italiano		
2000	Platense		
2000–2004	Unión San Felipe		
2004–2005	Coquimbo Unido		
2006–2008	Curicó Unido		
- * Club domestic league appearances and goals

Carlos Alberto Bechtholdt Bazzano (born 10 July 1969 in Buenos Aires, Argentina) is an Argentine former footballer who played as a midfielder for clubs in Argentina, Chile, Ecuador and Honduras.

== Personal life ==
He is the father of the Argentine footballers Franco and Nicolás Bechtholdt.

== Post-retirement ==
Bechtholdt served for over ten years as sporting director of Curicó Unido until 2024. He reassumed at the end of 2025.

== Titles ==
- Unión San Felipe 2000 Primera B
- Curicó Unido 2008 Primera B
