= Museo de Arte Contemporáneo (Madrid) =

Museum of Contemporary Art
- Museo de Arte Contemporáneo
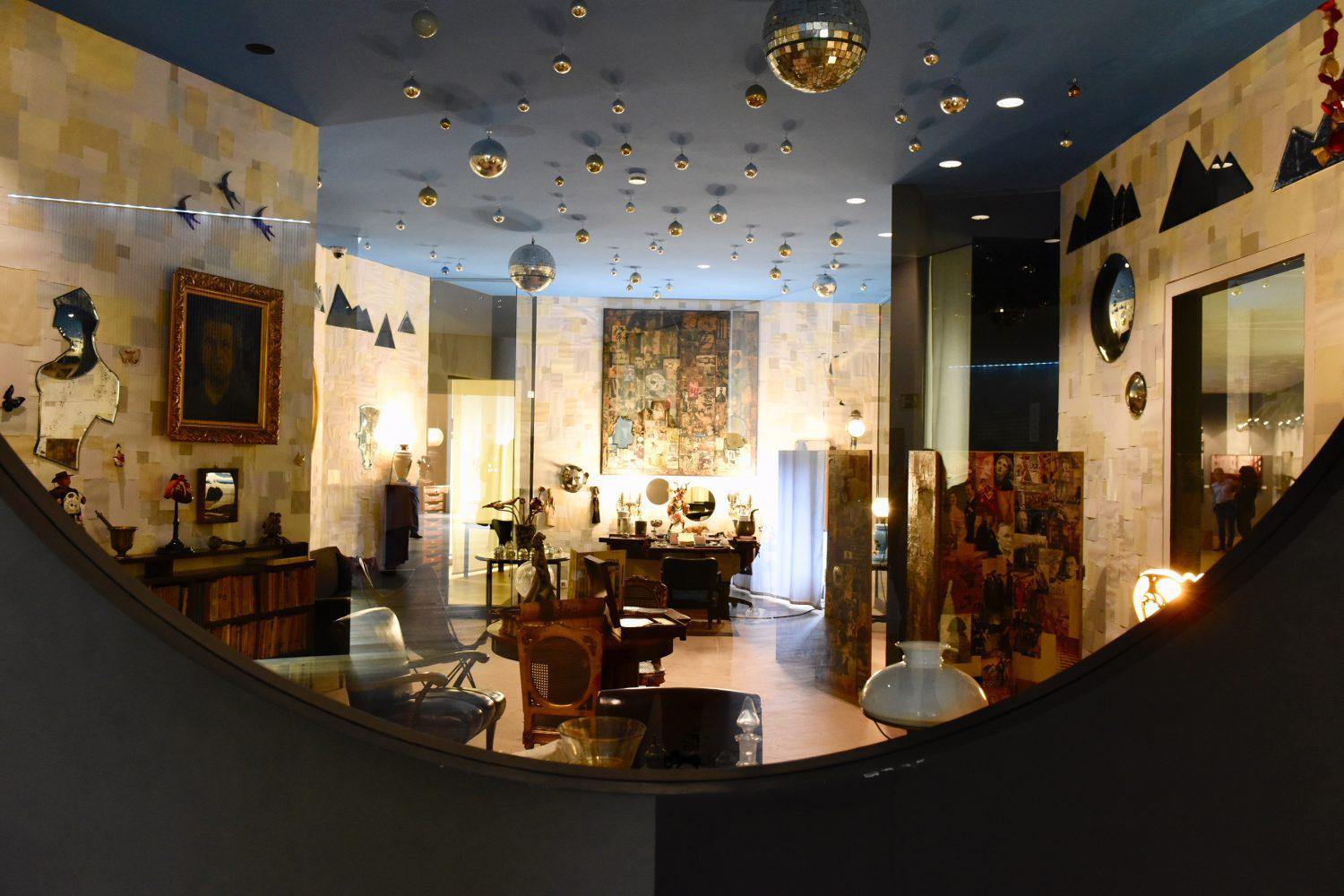
- Recreation of the study of Ramón Gómez de la Serna
- Established: 12 November 2001
- Location: Madrid, Spain
- Type: Art museum
- Owner: Ayuntamiento de Madrid

The Museo de Arte Contemporáneo (English: Museum of Contemporary Art), formerly known as Museo Municipal de Arte Contemporáneo, is a municipally owned museum in Madrid, Spain, located in the historic Conde Duque barracks. The museum was inaugurated in November 2001.

== Inauguration ==
The Museo de Arte Contemporáneo was inaugurated as Museo Municipal de Arte Contemporáneo on 12 November 2001. The opening pursued two basic aims: to create a permanent forum in the context of a center like the Conde Duque, open to an intense cultural and exhibition program, and to complement the other museums and contemporary art collections in Madrid. Similar to other contemporary art museums, both national and foreign, the Museo de Arte Contemporáneo has used a historic building to house the contemporary art collection, in this case of the Madrid City Council. The Museum is further part of an ongoing program of renovation to adapt it to use for cultural purposes. It showcases the works of art that the City Council has been acquiring since 1980, the year in which the collection began. The Museum covers two floors over roughly 22,000 square feet. This space exhibits nearly 200 works by over 175 artists from different periods and artistic movements in Spanish art, from the historic vanguards to date, through its collection of painting, sculpture, photography, graphic art and installations. The museum has been closed for renovation since April 2010. The re-opening was planned for October 2011, but the Museum will remain closed through 2012.

== Permanent collection ==
The Museum's permanent collection is made up principally of painting and graphic work although sculpture, photography and drawing are also represented. The permanent collection is exhibited chronologically on the second floor of the Museum and subdivided into the following categories:

=== Historical vanguards ===
This section, which opens the permanent collection, showcases the work of artists such as Francisco Bores, Benjamín Palencia, José Caballero, Daniel Vázquez Díaz and Hipólito Hidalgo de Caviedes.

=== New creators ===
Under the title New Creators: Figuration and Abstraction, this section brings together a wide range of artists who represent, using very different languages, a broad spectrum of tendencies and aesthetics. In the abstract category, there are works by Alejandro Corujeira, Alberto Reguera, Xavier Grau and Amaya Bozal. The figurative section is represented by artists such as Juan Carlos Savater, Sigfrido Martín Begué, Abraham La Calle, Dis Berlin and Fernando Bellver, among others.

=== Realism ===
Realism —or rather realisms— are represented here in their multiple fields: intimate, urban, fantastical or scenery. This section is opened by Amalia Avia and Isabel Quintanilla. The urban iconography of Madrid is represented by Daniel Quintero, José Manuel Ballester, Félix de la Concha and Menéndez Morán. Jesús Mari Lazkano and Carlos Díez Bustos offer examples of realism as applied to scenery and the fantastical. Luis Mayo offers a slightly metaphysical vision of some Madrid enclaves.

=== New figuration and abstraction of the 80s ===
The Museum has dedicated fours rooms to this section which shows a wide variety of artists who fully reflect the rich artistic panorama in Madrid post-informal abstraction and neo-figurative tendencies. The rooms include work from Eduardo Arroyo, Miguel Condé, Juan Genovés, Alfonso Fraile and Eduardo Úrculo. The New Madrid Figuration is very well represented by works from the time by Juan Antonio Aguirre, Carlos Alcolea and Manolo Quejido. Abstraction from these years is represented by Alfonso Albacete, among others.

== See also ==
- List of museums in Spain
