= Lazcano =

Lazcano, also spelled Lazkano, is a variant of the name of the Spanish Basque town of Lazkao.

== Notable people named Lazcano or Lazkano ==
- Alejandra Lazcano, Mexican actress
- Antonio Lazcano, Mexican biologist
- Heriberto Lazcano Lazcano, Mexican drug trafficker and leader of Los Zetas
- Jaime Lazcano, Spanish footballer
- Jesús Mari Lazkano, Spanish painter
- Jorge Marchant Lazcano, Chilean writer
- Juan Lazcano, Mexican-American boxer
- Julieta Lazcano, Argentine volleyball player
- Oier Lazkano (born 1999), Spanish cyclist
- Ramon Lazkano, Spanish composer and conductor

== See also ==
- Lazkao Txiki, legendary bertsolari (Basque-language impromptu poet)
- Lascano (surname)
