= Susú Pecoraro =

Argentine actress

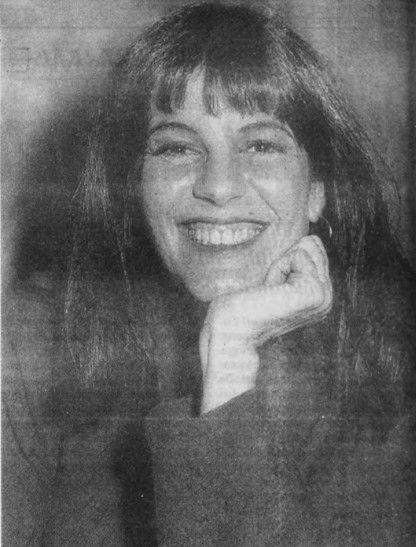
- Born: Susana Raquel Pecoraro; December 4, 1953 (age 72); Buenos Aires
- Occupation: Actress
- Years active: 1976 to date

Susana Raquel "Susú" Pecoraro (born December 4, 1953) is an Argentine film and television actress, one of the most popular of the country.

== Career ==
Susana Raquel Pecoraro was born in Buenos Aires in 1953. She enrolled at the Dramatic Arts Conservatory in 1970 and graduated in 1975. She debuted in the theatre of Argentina in 1976, with a role in Yo, Argentino (I'm (a disinterested) Argentine), and on television in a 1977 Channel 13 sitcom. She later had a role in a 1977 Venezuelan telenovela based on Emily Brontë's Wuthering Heights, and in 1978, debuted in the cinema of Argentina with a bit part in Manuel Antín's Allá lejos y hace tiempo (Long Ago and Far Away).

She was cast by María Luisa Bemberg in her 1982 drama, Señora de nadie (Nobody's Wife), and in 1984, she starred in the title role in Bemberg's historical drama, Camila, portraying Camila O'Gorman, a 19th-century Argentine socialite. The role earned her a Best Actress award at the Karlovy Vary and Havana Film Festivals. Later notable film roles in the decade included that of the wife of a man abducted by the dictatorship in Fernando Solanas' Sur (1987), and of Argentine intellectual in Prague in Beda Docampo Feijóo's Los Amores de Kafka (1988).

She continued to work in theatre, and in 1992 returned to cinema as a lovelorn woman in Juan José Jusid's ¿Dónde estás amor de mi vida que no te puedo encontrar? (Where Are You, Love of My Life?), later starring opposite Ulises Dumont as two lonely Argentines who meet by chance in Diego Musiak's Historias clandestinas en La Habana (1996). Among her more notable stage roles afterward were in a local 1995 production of Tennessee Williams' Night of the Iguana, and in a 2002 production of Eve Ensler's The Vagina Monologues.

Her turn as the title character in Adolfo Aristarain's Roma (2004) earned her a second Havana Film Festival Best Actress award, as well as ones from the Argentine Film Critics Association and Clarín. She portrayed the hysteric Sister Aloysius in a 2006 production of John Patrick Shanley's play Doubt: A Parable, and in 2011 was cast by Nicolás Gil Lavedra as the president of the Grandmothers of the Plaza de Mayo, Estela Barnes de Carlotto, in Estela.

== Notes ==
- Cine Nacional: Susú Pecoraro
