= Camila (film) =

1984 film

- Film Poster
- Directed by: María Luisa Bemberg
- Written by: María Luisa Bemberg; Beda Docampo Feijóo; Juan Bautista Stagnaro
- Produced by: Lita Stantic
- Starring: Susú Pecoraro; Imanol Arias; Héctor Alterio
- Cinematography: Fernando Arribas
- Edited by: Luis César D'Angiolillo
- Music by: Luis María Sierra
- Release date: 17 May 1984
- Running time: 105 minutes
- Country: Argentina
- Language: Spanish
- Budget: $380,000

Camila is a 1984 Argentine drama film directed by María Luisa Bemberg, based on the story of the 19th-century Argentine socialite Camila O'Gorman. The story had previously been adapted in 1910 by Mario Gallo, in the now considered lost film Camila O'Gorman. It was nominated for the Academy Award for Best Foreign Language Film, marking the second time an Argentine film was nominated for this award.

It was selected as the second greatest Argentine film of all time in a poll conducted by the Museo del Cine Pablo Ducrós Hicken in 2000. In a new version of the survey organized in 2022 by the specialized magazines La vida util, Taipei and La tierra quema, presented at the Mar del Plata International Film Festival, the film reached the 23 position. Also in 2022, the film was included in Spanish magazine Fotogramas's list of the 20 best Argentine films of all time.

== Plot ==
The film opens with the dedication "In memory of Camila O'Gorman and Ladislao Gutiérrez."

Argentina, circa 1827: Ana Perichon de O'Gorman is brought from a Brazilian convent to house arrest, where she is confined to her room in the hacienda of her estranged son, Adolfo O'Gorman. Adolfo treats her with unveiled contempt. Camila, a baby when her grandmother arrives, also initially rejects her grandmother. When Ana asks Camila whether she enjoys love stories, the girl responds that she doesn't know any.

In 1847, Camila is a Buenos Aires socialite. Raised on her grandmother's stories about her affair with former Colonial Viceroy Santiago de Liniers, Camila secretly reads French romance novels and books by political refugees like Esteban Echeverría. She is courted by Ignacio, a wealthy man with whom she is not in love. Her fellow socialites urge her to not let Ignacio get away. Camila bursts into tears as she describes her longing to marry for love. Her socialite friends are stunned.

Meanwhile, Adolfo supports the far-right single-party state led by Caudillo Juan Manuel de Rosas. Camila, however, is horrified by the state terrorism which Rosas routinely uses against opposition. She openly expresses these views, which enrages her father. One day, during confession, she meets a Jesuit priest, Father Ladislao Gutiérrez. Camila immediately develops a crush on him. Fr. Ladislao first rebukes Camila when she comes on to him and feels deeply ashamed that he returns her feelings. He attempts to do penance with a whip before sinking into a life-threatening fever.

During the funeral of her grandmother, Camila learns that Fr. Ladislao is ill and rushes to his bedside. To her shock, she finds him caressing a handkerchief which she had given him. She also kisses him on the lips, and he does not resist it. Upon his recovery, Fr. Ladislao finally surrenders to Camila's advances. For a time, they conduct a discreet affair, but Fr. Ladislao is troubled by the hypocrisy of his public priesthood and his private violation of his vows.

Abandoning everything, Fr. Ladislao and Camila elope to Corrientes Province, where they pose as a married couple. Fr. Ladislao works as a schoolteacher and gains the admiration of the village. Camila and Ladislao live in a small house on the side of a road. Ladislao remains torn between his love for Camila and a deep longing for his abandoned priesthood. With his troubled conscience brought to a crisis, Fr. Ladislao runs to the village church and screams at the Eucharist in the tabernacle. Meanwhile, Father Gannon notifies the village's police commandante.

The commandante, feeling grateful to Ladislao for teaching his children to read, warns Camila that he will do nothing until morning. He urges her and Ladislao to immediately flee across the Brazilian border. Deeply grateful, Camila frantically searches for Fr. Ladislao to tell him the news. When she finds him kneeling in prayer before the altar of the church, she bursts into tears, knowing that he has made his peace with God.

The next morning, Fr. Ladislao returns to Camila to say goodbye. Although he says that he still loves her, Fr. Ladislao explains that he must return to Buenos Aires, do penance, and continue his priestly ministry. Saddened but unremorseful, she responds, "I knew what I was doing." To both their horror, the commandante and his men arrive and arrest them both.

Camila's father, Adolfo O'Gorman, demands the death penalty for his daughter. With the Church Hierarchy and his political allies demanding retribution, Rosas issues a decree that both Camila and Fr. Ladislao are to be shot without trial.

In a military prison, Camila and Fr. Ladislao are forbidden to see each other. While imprisoned, Camila learns that she is carrying Fr. Ladislao's child. Despite the fact that the Law of Argentina forbids the execution of pregnant women, Rosas refuses to delay Camila's death sentence. After begging the prison chaplain to save her unborn child, the chaplain lets Camila drink a glass of holy water, thus baptizing her unborn child. Fr. Ladislao sends her a final letter affirming his love for her.

On 18 August 1848, Camila and Fr. Ladislao are tied to chairs, blindfolded, and carried before a firing squad in the prison courtyard side by side. The soldiers gun down Fr. Ladislao without hesitation, but they initially balk at killing a pregnant woman. When the commandante threatens to shoot them if they refuse to obey God's will, they open fire, riddling Camila's stomach with bullets, and place both bodies into the same coffin. Their final words are repeated in voiceover: "Ladislao, are you there?", "By your side, Camila."

== Cast ==
- Susú Pecoraro as Camila O'Gorman
- Imanol Arias as Fr. Ladislao Gutiérrez
- Héctor Alterio as Adolfo O'Gorman
- Elena Tasisto as Joaquina O'Gorman
- Claudio Gallardou as Fr. Eduardo O'Gorman
- Carlos Muñoz as Monsignor Elortondo
- Héctor Pellegrini as Commandant Soto
- Boris Rubaja as Ignacio, Camila's suitor

== Influences ==
Bemberg intended to fictionalize Camila O'Gorman as both a proto-feminist and a hopeless romantic, as opposed to the official history of a woman seduced and virtually kidnapped by her lover. No actor portrays the dictator Juan Manuel de Rosas and his actions are inferred only from the statements of other characters. This, and his constant presence in portraits, have caused some film critics to compare him to the ubiquitous Big Brother from George Orwell's dystopian novel Nineteen Eighty-Four.

One of the themes of the film is political censorship and filming ironically started on 10 December 1983, the day Democracy was re-established in Argentina.

During their elopement, Fr. Ladislao and Camila have sexual relations inside a horse-drawn coach. This is derived from a similar scene in the novel Madame Bovary by Gustav Flaubert.

== Historical inaccuracy ==
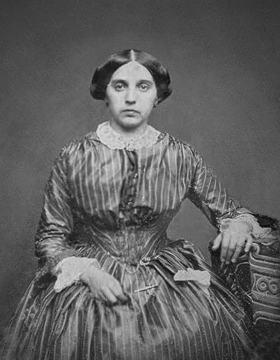
The real Camila O'Gorman, photographed shortly before her execution at Santos Lugares Prison

- In the film, the Catholic Church in Argentina is depicted as unconditionally supporting Rosas' dictatorial rule. Father Ladislao Gutierrez is inaccurately depicted as the sole exception among the clergy. From his first appearance at Camila's birthday celebration, Fr. Gutierrez is rebuked by his fellow Jesuits for not wearing the Scarlet insignia of the ruling Federalist Party. One of his superiors then pins the Rosista badge on the cassock of the visibly uncomfortable young priest. Later, when he denounces Rosas' police state tactics from the pulpit during Mass, the senior Jesuit pastor of the parish also rebukes him. In reality, the Society of Jesus, in which both Fr. Gutierrez and Camila's brother were priests, was the only institution within Argentine Catholicism which actually had a policy of speaking out. Their vocal criticism of his rule ultimately caused Rosas to sign a decree expelling all Jesuits from Argentina. Furthermore, Camila's brother, Fr. Eduardo O'Gorman, went into exile in Montevideo after the summary execution of his sister and only returned to his homeland after the 1852 defeat of Rosas at the Battle of Caseros and the Caudillo's subsequent overthrow.
- Camila's father, Adolfo O'Gorman, is depicted as a tyrannical and self-righteous autocrat who, in the words of one reviewer, "makes Elizabeth Barrett Browning's father look like Santa Claus." Adolfo's response to Camila's elopement is to blame her for the scandal which has ruined his good name. Adolfo's hatred of his daughter and obsession with making her pay causes Camila's mother to curse the day she married him. More recent scholars have attempted to paint a different picture of Adolfo O'Gorman. In a letter to Rosas sent immediately following his daughter's elopement, Adolfo O'Gorman placed the blame squarely on Fr. Ladislao Gutierrez, who, he claimed, had seduced his daughter, "under the guise of religion". Adolfo further described himself and his family as heartbroken and pleaded that his daughter be rescued from the man he regarded as her abductor. Scholars who have read the letter believe that Adolfo genuinely loved his daughter.
- When her husband refuses to ask for clemency for their daughter, Camila's mother laments that no one cares about her daughter's life. Adolfo, she says, cares only about his honor, while Rosas, the Federalist Party, and the Church care only about maintaining power, and the Unitarian Party cares only about using the scandal for political gain. "But no one", she screams, "cares about my daughter!" In reality, the Leader's own daughter, Camila's close friend Manuela Rosas, begged her father to grant clemency. Rosas' decision to ignore their pleas and execute a pregnant woman horrified his supporters, sent shock waves across Argentina, and, according to some historians, contributed to his overthrow and exile in 1852. Historian Manuel Bilbao later commented, "It would have been better for Rosas to have lost a battle than to shoot Camila, such was the damage which he did to his prestige and authority."

== In popular culture ==
In 2001, Camila: The Musical, based on the film and with words and music written by Lori McKelvey, debuted in Philadelphia.

Camila is featured in the book Pop Culture in Latin America and the Caribbean written by Elizabeth Gackstetter Nichols and Timothy R. Robbins. The book explores the film and the significance it had.

== See also ==
- List of submissions to the 57th Academy Awards for Best Foreign Language Film
- List of Argentine submissions for the Academy Award for Best Foreign Language Film
