= Carlos Miguens Bemberg =

Argentine businessman (1949–2026)

Carlos José Miguens Bemberg (16 February 1949 – 19 July 2026) was an Argentine businessman and descendant of the wealthy Bemberg family of immigrants to Argentina.

== Life and career ==
His parents were the architect Carlos Miguens and the film director María Luisa Bemberg. Carlos attended school at Colegio San Jorge, Colegio Cardenal Newman, and Universidad del Salvador, where he completed four years of studies in economics. He was a director of the Luxembourg-based holding company Quilmes Industrial S.A. (Quinsa) from 1989 until his resignation on 17 May 2006.

His professional experience included president of Cerveza Quilmes, one of Argentina's largest brewing companies which was founded by his grandfather Otto Bemberg in 1888 in Quilmes, Buenos Aires Province. He was president of M.B.P. International, and was president of M.B. Holdings (Miguens Bemberg Holdings) and Agropecuaria Cantomi. He was very active in Argentina's mining industry, acting as a director of Patagonia Gold S.A. since its inception, and was a director of Minera El Desquite S.A. Bemberg died from cancer on 19 July 2026, at the age of 77.
