= Lascano (surname) =

Lascano is a Spanish surname from Basque surname Lazcano or Laskano, a variant of the name of the Spanish Basque town of Lazkao. Notable people with the name include:

- Carlos Lascano, (born 1973), Argentine director, writer, and producer
- Marcelo Lascano, Argentine historian and economist
