= Camila O'Gorman =

Argentine socialite executed in 1848

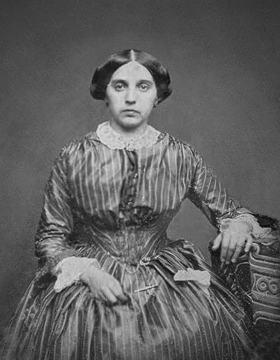
- Camila O'Gorman in 1848
- Born: Maria Camila O'Gorman Ximénez; 9 July 1825; Merced, Buenos Aires, Argentina
- Died: 18 August 1848 (aged 23); San Andrés, Buenos Aires Province

Maria Camila O'Gorman Ximénez (9 July 1825 – 18 August 1848) was an Argentine socialite who was executed over a scandal involving her relationship with a Roman Catholic priest. She was 23 years old and allegedly eight months pregnant when she and Father Ladislao Gutiérrez faced a firing squad.

== Biography ==
Camila was born in Buenos Aires, the youngest daughter of Adolfo O'Gorman y Perichón de Vandeuil, and his wife, Joaquina Ximénez Pinto. She was the second-to-last of six children in an upper-class family of mixed Irish Catholic, French aristocratic, and Spanish descent. Typical of powerful families in Argentina's post-colonial era, two of her brothers went on to pursue reputable careers. Fr. Eduardo O'Gorman was ordained as a Roman Catholic priest of the Jesuit Order, and the other as a police officer and the eventual founder of the Buenos Aires Police Academy.

She was also the granddaughter of French noblewoman Ana Périchon de O'Gorman (1776–1847), the mistress of the Santiago de Liniers, First Count of Buenos Aires. When the first British invasion occurred, Liniers masterminded the successful recapture of Buenos Aires from the Royal Navy. For his heroic actions in defence of the city, Santiago de Liniers was appointed Viceroy of the Río de la Plata, and Perichon de O'Gorman became the unofficial first lady. Her influence and power led to intrigues intended to discredit her, including allegations that she was a spy for the French or the English. After Liniers died in 1810 she retired to a quieter life with her sons and died peacefully in 1847, at the age of 72.

From 1829 to 1852, the Argentine Confederation was governed as a single party state by Juan Manuel de Rosas, a General of the Argentine Army and a Federalist Party politician, around whom a pervasive cult of personality had been erected. Camila was considered a pillar of polite society, a close friend and confidante of Rosas' daughter, Manuelita, and a frequent guest at the Governors Residence. In her late teens, Camila was introduced to Father Ladislao Gutiérrez, whose family had persuaded him to enter the Roman Catholic priesthood and who had attended the same Jesuit seminary as Camila's brother Eduardo.

At the time, the Society of Jesus was the only institution within Argentina's Catholic Church which continued to speak out against Rosas' police state tactics. This led Rosas to later banish the Jesuits from Argentina. Father Gutiérrez also came from a similar background; his uncle was the provincial governor of Tucumán, Celedonio Gutiérrez. Father Gutiérrez had been assigned as the parish priest of Nuestra Señora del Socorro (Our Lady of Relief) and was frequently invited to the O'Gorman family's estate. They soon began a clandestine affair.

They escaped from Buenos Aires on 12 December 1847, bound for the United States, where they inaccurately believed, "priests may marry." They ultimately settled in Goya, Corrientes Province, where they set up the town's first school and posed as a married couple under false names. Corrientes was at the time under the control of Benjamín Virasoro, a warlord hostile to Rosas. As the scandal broke, Adolfo O'Gorman sent a letter to Rosas accusing Gutierrez of having seduced Camila, "under the guise of religion". Adolfo described himself and his family as heartbroken and pleaded that his daughter be rescued from the man he accused of having kidnapped her.

Rosas' exiled political opponents and future Unitarian Party President Domingo Faustino Sarmiento declared that Rosas was responsible for the moral corruption of Argentine womanhood. Camila and Ladislao were recognised by an Irish-Argentine priest, Fr. Michael Gannon. Other Irish Argentines, including Father Anthony Fahy and lawyer Dalmacio Vélez Sarsfield "demanded an exemplary punishment of the wayward daughter that was also giving the industrious and well-regarded [Irish] community a bad name".

The couple was abducted from Corrientes Province and returned to Buenos Aires. Camila claimed she had initiated her relationship with Gutierrez and insisted on their elopement, angrily denying rumors that she had been raped. From Buenos Aires, Rosas had given strict orders – the fugitives were to be sent to the prison of Santos Lugares in separate carriages – as indicated by Foreign Relations Minister Felipe Arana in his warrant of arrest.

== Death ==
Before reaching their final destination, Camila wrote to Manuela Rosas, with the hope that she might persuade her father to grant clemency. Manuelita immediately replied to her friend's letter, promising to help. Manuelita optimistically furnished a cell in a nearby convent with a piano and books. However, Rosas rejected his daughter's pleas, claiming that the scandal, "needs a show of my undisputed power, as the moral values and sacred religious norms of a whole society are at stake". At the time, Rosas had removed the administration of justice from the courts and taken it upon himself. "To the astonishment even of hardened officials, in spite of Camila's plea that she was pregnant", Rosas signed a decree ordering their immediate executions.

According to historian John Lynch, "The savage sentence was the responsibility of Rosas alone. The higher clergy and the lawyers seem to have urged severity, but he subsequently denied that he was influenced by any outsider."

Immediately after arriving at the prison, as required by canon law, Father Castellanos, the prison chaplain, visited Camila's cell and performed an emergency baptism of her unborn baby. This consisted of Camila drinking holy water and placing consecrated ashes on her forehead. The next morning, 18 August 1848, O'Gorman and Gutiérrez were taken to the courtyard, tied to chairs, and blindfolded. As Camila was "standing tragically in white", both were executed by firing squad.

A memoir first published in 1883, Antonino Reyes, who had served Rosas for 14 years and was his aide-de-camp, secretary, sergeant major, and chief of police at Santos Lugares Prison, recalled being so moved that he decided not to witness the executions and out of compassion ordered both bodies to be placed in the same coffin. Only then did Reyes write to Rosas and inform him that his orders had been carried out. In the aftermath of their deaths, Sarmiento and the Unitario Party opposition changed their tone drastically and wrote about the executions using terms such as "the beautiful girl", "the doomed couple", and "the repression of love". Camila was 23 years old and eight months pregnant with an illegitimate child. Father Gutiérrez was 24 years old.

Rosas, who, according to John Lynch, "was curiously proud of his judgment", claimed sole responsibility in his memoirs for having ordered the executions and, conveniently overlooking the pleas on Camila's behalf from his own daughter, the former caudillo wrote, "No one advised me to execute the priest Gutiérrez and Camila O'Gorman, nor did anyone speak to me on their behalf. On the contrary, all the leading members of the clergy spoke or wrote to me about this insolent crime and the urgent necessity to make an exemplary punishment to prevent similar scandals in the future. I thought the same. And as it was my responsibility, I ordered the execution."

In reality, the executions, according to historian John Lynch, were "a new cause of alienation from his regime." British journalist and diplomat Henry Southern wrote to Lord Palmerston, "A panic seized the population of Buenos Ayres (sic), and the imaginations of men were occupied in devising what would be the next act by which Rosas would mark this eventful period." Historian Manuel Bilbao later commented, "It would have been better for Rosas to have lost a battle than to shoot Camila, such was the damage which he did to his prestige and authority."

The detailed diary of Buenos Aires resident Juan Manuel Beruti also describes the horror that the executions caused, "These deaths caused shock and sadness among all the inhabitants of the city, for an offense which was not thought to deserve the death penalty but merely detention for a time to clear the scandal they had caused, in a simple affair of love which harmed no one, only themselves. The most lamentable aspect was that she was eight months pregnant. The governor was informed, but this gentleman ignored the innocent creature in the womb, did not wait for the mother to give birth, and ordered her to be shot. Such a thing had never happened in Buenos Aires; by killing two, three died."

Camila's brother, Fr. Eduardo O'Gorman, went into exile in Montevideo after the summary execution of his sister and only returned to his homeland after the 1852 defeat of Rosas at the Battle of Caseros and the Caudillo's subsequent overthrow.

== In popular culture ==
=== Classical music ===
Preludio Sinfónico, Un relato sobre Camila by the Argentinian composer Claudia Montero was first performed in Montevideo, Uruguay on International Women's Day (Día Internacional de la Mujer) 7 March 2019.

The Execution Scene of Ladislao and Camila is a classical organ solo by composer Shannon M. Grama.

=== In film ===
- 1910 – Camila O'Gorman, directed by Mario Gallo and starring Blanca Podestá in the title role. It was one of the first feature films made in Argentina, and is now lost.
- 1984 – Camila, directed by María Luisa Bemberg and starring Susú Pecoraro as Camila O'Gorman, Imanol Arias as Father Gutiérrez, and Héctor Alterio. It was Argentina's second nomination ever to an Academy Award (the Academy Award for Best Foreign Language Film).

=== In poetry ===
- English poet John Masefield both dramatized and versified the story of Camila and Fr. Gutiérrez in his 1926 poem Rosas.

== Bibliography ==
- Lascano, Marcelo (2005). Imposturas históricas e identidad nacional (in Spanish). Buenos Aires: El Ateneo. ISBN 950-02-5900-1.
- Iturbe-La Grave, Valentina (2015). "CamilaO'Gorman:Realidad y Mito en el Imaginario Cultural Argentino (1847–1884)" [Camila O'Gorman: reality and myth in the Argentine cultural imagination] (in Spanish). University of Colorado at Boulder.
