= Marie Anne Périchon de Vandeuil =

French noblewoman (1775–1847)

Marie Anne Périchon de Vandeuil d'Abeille

Personal details
- Born: 4 April 1775 Saint-Denis, Réunion, France
- Died: 2 December 1847 (aged 72) La Matanza, Buenos Aires Province, Argentina
- Resting place: La Recoleta Cemetery
- Spouse: Thomas O'Gorman

Marie Anne Périchon de Vandeuil (1775-1847), known as la Perichona, was a French noblewoman, who had an active role in the politics of Buenos Aires during the last year's of Spanish rule over the Viceroyalty of the Río de la Plata.

== Biography ==
Marie Anne Périchon de Vandeuil was born in Île Bourbon, France, the daughter of Armand Etienne Perichon de Vandeuil and Jeanne Magdeleine d'Abeille, who both belonged to the French nobility. His grandfather, Etienne Guillaume Périchon, was Collector of Domains and Forests of the Government of Moulins. The ancestors of the Périchon family lived for centuries in his "hotel" on the Rue Saint-Denis.

In about 1798, Marie Anne arrived from Montevideo at the port of Buenos Aires with her husband, Thomas O'Gorman, an Irish Catholic merchant from Ennis, County Clare and veteran of the Irish Brigade in the French Royal Army. Thomas was also the nephew of Michael O'Gorman, the director of the Protomedicato del Río de la Plata. While O'Gorman was highly successful as a merchant, he was believed by Spanish colonial officials to be a British spy, which may well have been true. In 1804, when O'Gorman returned to the city from Europe, he was in the company of James Florence Burke, who definitely was a secret agent in the service of the British crown.

Meanwhile, Marie Anne Périchon had an adulterous relationship with fellow French expatriate Santiago de Liniers. During the British invasions of the River Plate, the house of the O'Gormans was protected by a French flag. After his military leadership ensured that the British expeditions were vanquished, Liniers was appointed Viceroy.

Thomas O'Gorman, for his own part, supported the British during the 1806 invasion attempt and, after their defeat, he was forced to flee for his own safety to Rio de Janeiro.

During Liniers' tenure as Viceroy, he and Périchon cohabitated and she served as the de facto Vice-Reine. But after a series of disagreements with the Cabildo led to his replacement by Baltasar Hidalgo de Cisneros in 1809, Périchon also went into exile in Brazil. Liniers was executed by firing squad at Cordoba in 1810, in the immediate aftermath of the May Revolution, after being defeated in battle while leading a Royalist uprising against the newly declared Argentine Republican Government. The official charges against Liniers were of conspiracy and rebellion. Once she was notified of the demise of Liniers, Périchon returned to Buenos Aires, where she was forced to live in a recluse way, with minimal outside social contact until her death in 1847.

Thomas O'Gorman and Marie Anne Périchon, were the paternal grandparents of Camila O'Gorman, a pregnant socialite who was executed by firing squad in 1848 on the orders of Caudillo Juan Manuel de Rosas, for having eloped and secretly cohabitated with Fr. Ladislao Gutiérrez, a Roman Catholic priest of the Society of Jesus. They were also the grandparents of Fr. Eduardo O'Gorman.
