= Sur (film) =

- Directed by: Fernando E. Solanas
- Written by: Fernando E. Solanas
- Produced by: Fernando E. Solanas; Envar El Kadri; Pierre Novat; Patricia Novat
- Starring: Susú Pecoraro; Miguel Ángel Solá; Philippe Léotard; Lito Cruz
- Cinematography: Félix Monti
- Edited by: Juan Carlos Macías
- Music by: Ástor Piazzolla; Fernando E. Solanas
- Distributed by: Argentina Sono Film
- Release date: 5 March 1988
- Running time: 127 minutes
- Country: Argentina
- Language: Spanish

Sur (South) is a 1988 Argentine drama film written and directed by Fernando E. Solanas. The film features Susú Pecoraro, Miguel Ángel Solá, Philippe Léotard, Lito Cruz, Ulises Dumont among others.

Following its debut at the 1988 Cannes Film Festival, Sur collected a host of awards from prestigious international film festivals. Sur garnered its director, Fernando E. Solanas the Best Director at Cannes in 1988 and was nominated for the Palme d'Or in the same year. The film was selected to be screened in the Cannes Classics section of the 2015 Cannes Film Festival.

In a survey of the 100 greatest films of Argentine cinema carried out by the Museo del Cine Pablo Ducrós Hicken in 2000, the film reached the 33rd position. In a new version of the survey organized in 2022 by the specialized magazines La vida útil, Taipei and La tierra quema, presented at the Mar del Plata International Film Festival, the film reached the 40th position.

== Plot ==
Floreal is released from prison prior to the end of a military coup d'état in 1983. He discovers his wife has cheated on him and is not sure he wants to return to his former life and family. A friend, "El-Negro", who was killed during the military coup, appears in the night with a special mission: to help Floreal face what has happened when he was serving time in prison. El-Negro helps him to live through the important events that happened in his absence. El-Negro helps him get past his anger, understanding how hard it was to endure such a difficult time and how the military coup had crushed people's lives. When El-Negro finally tells him he must return, Floreal realizes he must be strong and, like his coup-stricken country, pick up and go on with his life.

== Cast ==
- Susú Pecoraro as Rosi Echegoyen
- Miguel Ángel Solá as Floreal Echegoyen
- Philippe Léotard as Roberto
- Lito Cruz as El Negro
- Ulises Dumont as Emilio
- Roberto Goyeneche as Amado
- Gabriela Toscano as Blondi
- Mario Lozano as Echegoyen
- Nathán Pinzón as Rasatti
- Antonio Ameijeiras as Peregrino
- Inés Molina as María
- Fito Páez as Marcelo
- Niní Gambier as Adela
- Chany Mallo as Floreal's mother
- Susana Mayo as Cora
- Ricardo Alaniz as Arturito
- Luis Romero as Yacumin

== Awards ==
Wins

- 1988 Cannes Film Festival: Best Director Award, Fernando Solanas (Prix de la mise en scène), Audience Award, Fernando Solanas 1988.
- 1988 Film Fest Gent: Georges Delerue Award, Ástor Piazzolla
- Havana Film Festival:Grand Coral - First Prize, Fernando Solanas

== Nominations ==
- 1988 Cannes Film Festival: Golden Palm (Fernando Solana)
