= Iconography =

Branch of art history

Holbein's The Ambassadors (1533) is a complex work whose iconography remains the subject of debate.

Iconography, as a branch of art history, studies the identification, description and interpretation of the content of images: the subjects depicted, the particular compositions and details used to do so, and other elements that are distinct from artistic style. The word iconography comes from the Greek εἰκών ("image") and γράφειν ("to write" or to draw).

A secondary meaning (based on a non-standard translation of the Greek and Russian equivalent terms) is the production or study of the religious images, called "icons", in the Byzantine and Orthodox Christian tradition. This usage is mostly found in works translated from languages such as Greek or Russian, with the correct term being "icon painting".

In art history, "an iconography" may also mean a particular depiction of a subject in terms of the content of the image, such as the number of figures used, their placing and gestures. The term is also used in many academic fields other than art history, for example semiotics, media studies, and archaeology, and in general usage, for the content of images, the typical depiction in images of a subject, and related senses.

Sometimes distinctions have been made between iconology and iconography, although the definitions, and so the distinction made, varies. When referring to movies, genres are immediately recognizable through their iconography, motifs that become associated with a specific genre through repetition.

== Scholarship ==
=== Foundations ===
Early Western writers who took special note of the content of images include Giorgio Vasari, whose Ragionamenti interpreted the paintings in the Palazzo Vecchio in Florence. Ragionamenti reassuringly demonstrates that such works were difficult to understand even for well-informed contemporaries. Lesser known, though it had informed poets, painters and sculptors for over two centuries after its 1593 publication, was Cesare Ripa's emblem book Iconologia. Gian Pietro Bellori, a 17th-century biographer of artists of his own time, describes and analyses, not always correctly, many works. Lessing's study (1796) of the classical figure Amor with an inverted torch was an early attempt to use a study of a type of image to explain the culture it originated in, rather than the other way round.

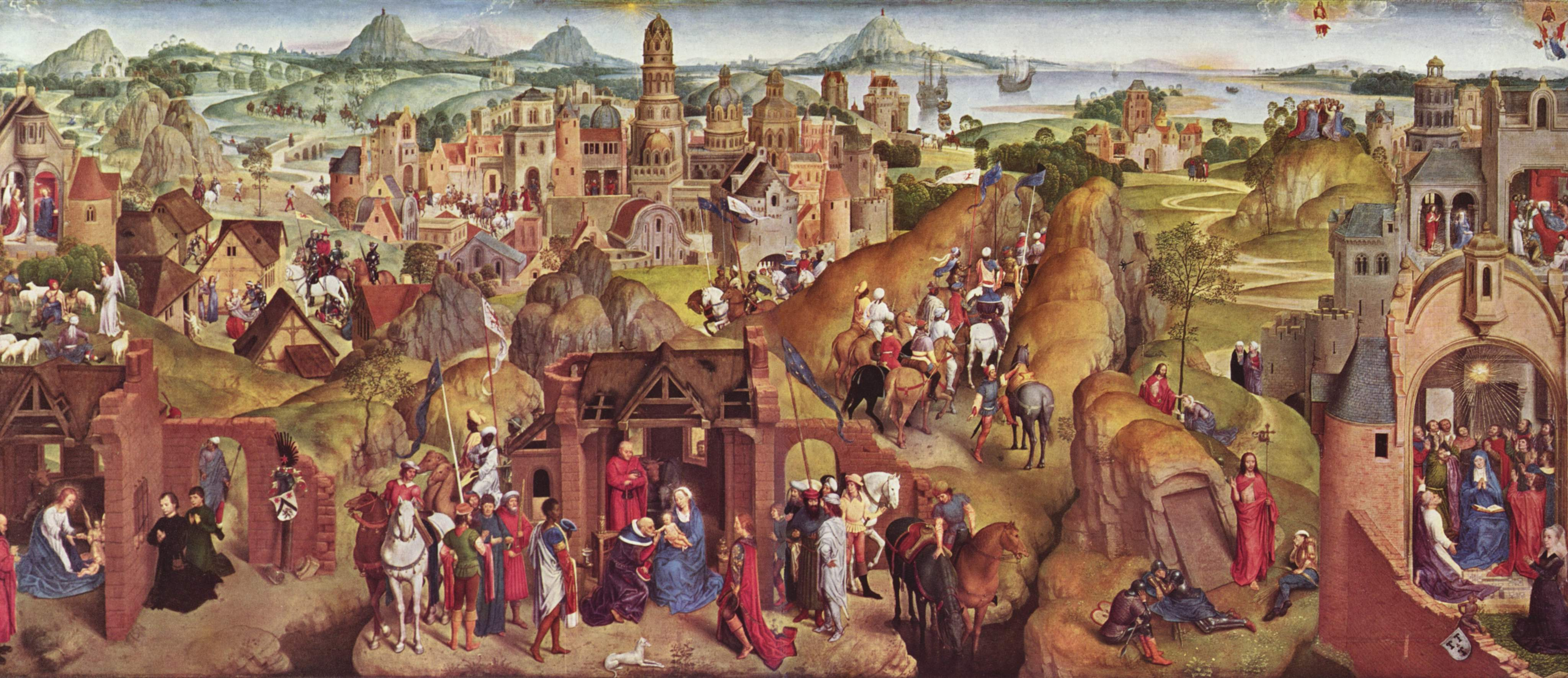
A painting with complex iconography: Hans Memling's so-called Seven Joys of the Virgin – in fact this is a later title for a Life of the Virgin cycle on a single panel. Altogether 25 scenes, not all involving the Virgin, are depicted. 1480, Alte Pinakothek, Munich.

Iconography as an academic art historical discipline developed in the nineteenth century in the works of scholars such as Adolphe Napoleon Didron (1806–1867), Anton Heinrich Springer (1825–1891), and Émile Mâle (1862–1954) all specialists in Christian religious art, which was the main focus of study in this period, in which French scholars were especially prominent. They looked back to earlier attempts to classify and organise subjects encyclopedically like Cesare Ripa and Anne Claude Philippe de Caylus's Recueil d'antiquités égyptiennes, étrusques, grècques, romaines et gauloises as guides to understanding works of art, both religious and profane, in a more scientific manner than the popular aesthetic approach of the time. These early contributions paved the way for encyclopedias, manuals, and other publications useful in identifying the content of art. Mâle's l'Art religieux du XIIIe siècle en France (originally 1899, with revised editions) translated into English as The Gothic Image, Religious Art in France of the Thirteenth Century has remained continuously in print.

=== Twentieth century ===
In early twentieth-century Germany, Aby Warburg (1866–1929) and his followers Fritz Saxl (1890–1948) and Erwin Panofsky (1892–1968) elaborated the practice of identification and classification of motifs in images to using iconography as a means to understanding meaning. Panofsky codified an influential approach to iconography in his 1939 Studies in Iconology, where he defined it as "the branch of the history of art which concerns itself with the subject matter or meaning of works of art, as opposed to form," although the distinction he and other scholars drew between particular definitions of "iconography" (put simply, the identification of visual content) and "iconology" (the analysis of the meaning of that content), has not been generally accepted, though it is still used by some writers.

In the United States, to which Panofsky immigrated in 1931, students such as Frederick Hartt, and Meyer Schapiro continued under his influence in the discipline. In an influential article of 1942, Introduction to an "Iconography of Mediaeval Architecture", Richard Krautheimer, a specialist on early medieval churches and another German émigré, extended iconographical analysis to architectural forms.

The period from 1940 can be seen as one where iconography was especially prominent in art history. Whereas most iconographical scholarship remains highly dense and specialized, some analyses began to attract a much wider audience, for example Panofsky's theory (now generally out of favour with specialists of that picture) that the writing on the rear wall in the Arnolfini Portrait by Jan van Eyck turned the painting into the record of a marriage contract. Holbein's The Ambassadors has been the subject of books for a general market with new theories as to its iconography, and the best-sellers of Dan Brown include theories, disowned by most art historians, on the iconography of works by Leonardo da Vinci.

The method of iconology, which had developed following the publications of Erwin Panofsky, has been critically discussed since the mid-1950s, in part also strongly (Otto Pächt, Svetlana Alpers). However, among the critics, no one has found a model of interpretation that could completely replace that of Panofsky.

As regards the interpretation of Christian art, that Panofsky researched throughout his life, the iconographic interest in texts as possible sources remains important, because the meaning of Christian images and architecture is closely linked to the content of biblical, liturgical and theological texts, which were usually considered authoritative by most patrons, artists and viewers.

Technological advances allowed the building-up of huge collections of photographs, with an iconographic arrangement or index, which include those of the Warburg Institute and the Index of Medieval Art (formerly Index of Christian Art) at Princeton (which has made a specialism of iconography since its early days in America). These are now being digitised and made available online, usually on a restricted basis.

With the arrival of computing, the Iconclass system, a highly complex system for the classification of the content of images, with 40,000+ classification types, and 84,000 (14,000 unique) keywords, was developed in the Netherlands as a standard classification for recording collections, with the idea of assembling huge databases that will allow the retrieval of images featuring particular details, subjects or other common factors. For example, the Iconclass code "71H7131" is for the subject of "Bathsheba (alone) with David's letter", whereas "71" is the whole "Old Testament" and "71H" the "story of David". A number of collections of different types have been classified using Iconclass, notably many types of old master print, the collections of the Gemäldegalerie, Berlin and the German Marburger Index. These are available, usually on-line or on DVD. The system can also be used outside pure art history, for example on sites like Flickr.

== Brief survey ==
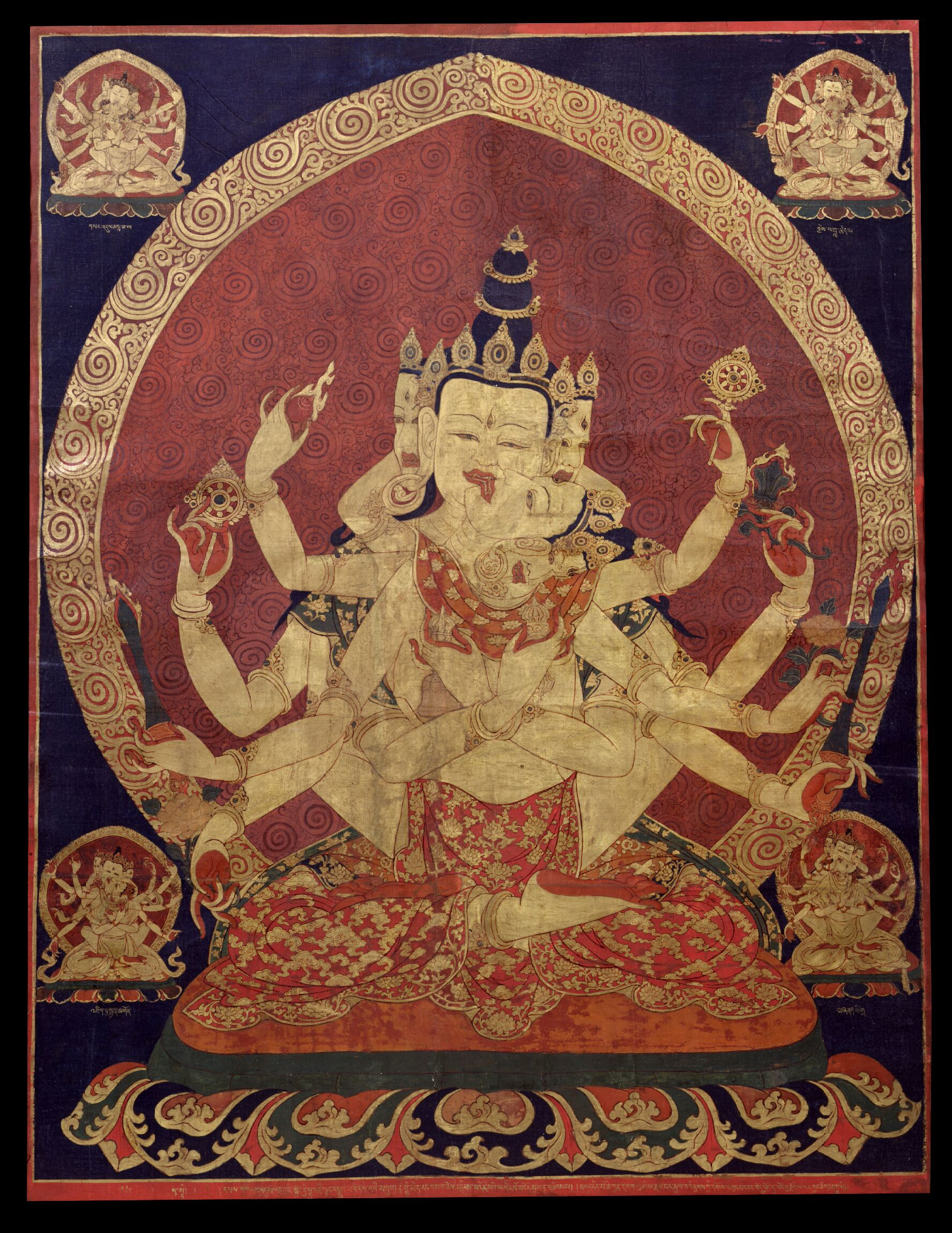
A 17th-century Central Tibetan thanka of Guhyasamaja Akshobhyavajra

Religious images are used to some extent by all major religions, including both Indian and Abrahamic faiths, and often contain highly complex iconography, which reflects centuries of accumulated tradition. Secular Western iconography later drew upon these themes.

=== Indian religions ===
Central to the iconography and hagiography of Indian religions are mudra or gestures with specific meanings. Other features include the aureola and halo, also found in Christian and Islamic art, and divine qualities and attributes represented by asana and ritual tools such as the dharmachakra, vajra, chhatra, sauwastika, phurba and danda. The symbolic use of colour to denote the Classical Elements or Mahabhuta and letters and bija syllables from sacred alphabetic scripts are other features. Under the influence of tantra art developed esoteric meanings, accessible only to initiates; this is an especially strong feature of Tibetan art. The art of Indian Religions, especially Hindus, in its numerous sectoral divisions, is governed by sacred texts called the Agamas which describes the ratio and proportion of the icon, called taalmaana as well as mood of the central figure in a context. For example, Narasimha, an incarnation of Vishnu, though considered a wrathful deity, is in few contexts, depicted in pacified mood.

Although iconic depictions of, or concentrating on, a single figure are the dominant type of Buddhist image, large stone relief or fresco narrative cycles of the Life of the Buddha, or tales of his previous lives, are found at major sites like Sarnath, Ajanta, and Borobudor, especially in earlier periods. Conversely, in Hindu art, narrative scenes have become rather more common in recent centuries, especially in miniature paintings of the lives of Krishna and Rama.

=== Christianity ===
Christian art features Christian iconography, prominently developed in the medieval era and the Renaissance, and is a prominent aspect of Christian media. Aniconism was rejected within Christian theology from the outset, and the development of early Christian art and architecture occurred within the first seven centuries after Jesus. Small images in the Catacombs of Rome show orans figures, portraits of Christ and some saints, and a limited number of "abbreviated representations" of biblical episodes emphasizing deliverance. From the Constantinian period monumental art borrowed motifs from Roman Imperial imagery, classical Greek and Roman religion and popular art – the motif of Christ in Majesty owes something to both Imperial portraits and depictions of Zeus. In the Late Antique period iconography began to be standardized, and to relate more closely to Biblical texts, although many gaps in the canonical Gospel narratives were plugged with matter from the apocryphal gospels. Eventually, the Church would succeed in weeding most of these out, but some remain, like the ox and ass in the Nativity of Christ.

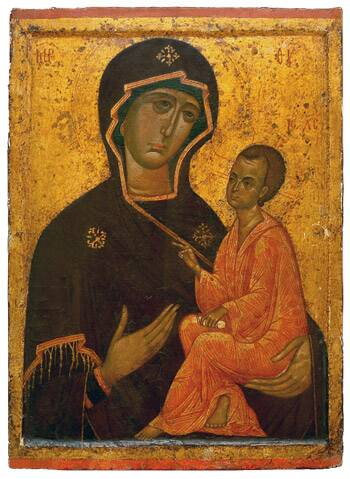
The Theotokos of Tikhvin of c. 1300, an example of the Hodegetria type of Madonna and Child

After the period of Byzantine iconoclasm iconographical innovation was regarded as unhealthy, if not heretical, in the Eastern Church, though it still continued at a glacial pace. More than in the West, traditional depictions were often considered to have authentic or miraculous origins, and the job of the artist was to copy them with as little deviation as possible. The Eastern church also never accepted the use of monumental high relief or free-standing sculpture, which it found too reminiscent of paganism. Most modern Eastern Orthodox icons are very close to their predecessors of a thousand years ago, though development, and some shifts in meaning, have occurred – for example, the old man wearing a fleece in conversation with Saint Joseph usually seen in Orthodox Nativities seems to have begun as one of the shepherds, or the prophet Isaiah, but is now usually understood as the "Tempter" (Satan).

In both East and West, numerous iconic types of Christ, Mary and saints and other subjects were developed; the number of named types of icons of Mary, with or without the infant Christ, was especially large in the East, whereas Christ Pantocrator was much the commonest image of Christ. Especially important depictions of Mary include the Hodegetria and Panagia types. Traditional models evolved for narrative paintings, including large cycles covering the events of the Life of Christ, the Life of the Virgin, parts of the Old Testament, and, increasingly, the lives of popular saints. Especially in the West, a system of attributes developed for identifying individual figures of saints by a standard appearance and symbolic objects held by them; in the East, they were more likely to identified by text labels.

From the Romanesque period sculpture on churches became increasingly important in Western art, and probably partly because of the lack of Byzantine models, became the location of much iconographic innovation, along with the illuminated manuscript, which had already taken a decisively different direction from Byzantine equivalents, under the influence of Insular art and other factors. Developments in theology and devotional practice produced innovations like the subject of the Coronation of the Virgin and the Assumption, Both associated with the Franciscans, as were many other developments. Most painters remained content to copy and slightly modify the works of others, and it is clear that the clergy, by whom or for whose churches most art was commissioned, often specified what they wanted shown in great detail.

The theory of typology, by which the meaning of most events of the Old Testament was understood as a "type" or pre-figuring of an event in the life of, or aspect of, Christ or Mary was often reflected in art, and in the later Middle Ages came to dominate the choice of Old Testament scenes in Western Christian art.

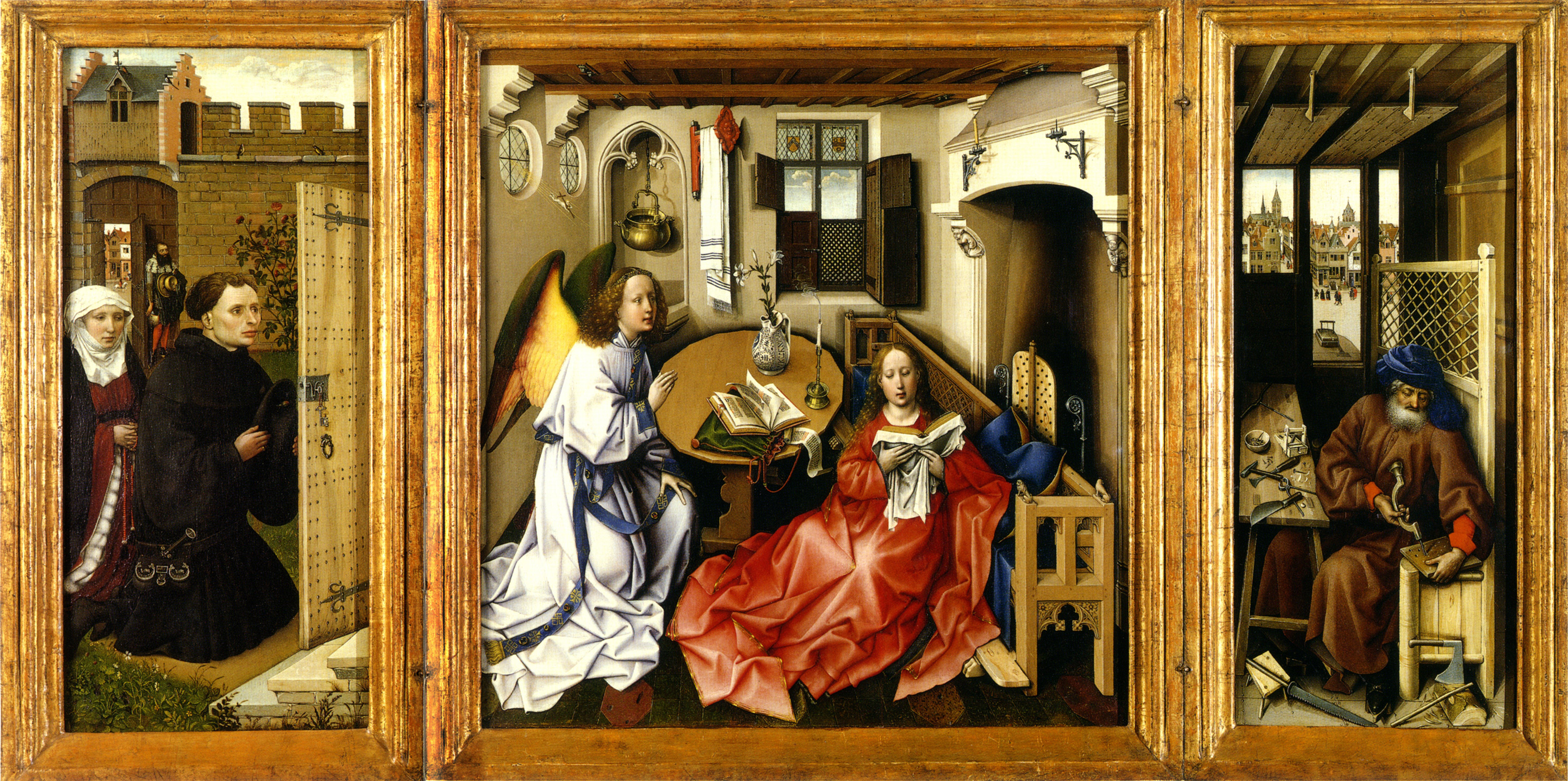
Robert Campin's Mérode Altarpiece of 1425–28 has a highly complex iconography that is still debated. Is Joseph making a mousetrap, reflecting a remark of Saint Augustine that Christ's Incarnation was a trap to catch men's souls?

Whereas in the Romanesque and Gothic periods the great majority of religious art was intended to convey often complex religious messages as clearly as possible, with the arrival of Early Netherlandish painting iconography became highly sophisticated, and in many cases appears to be deliberately enigmatic, even for a well-educated contemporary. The subtle layers of meaning uncovered by modern iconographical research in works of Robert Campin such as the Mérode Altarpiece, and of Jan van Eyck such as the Madonna of Chancellor Rolin and the Washington Annunciation lie in small details of what are on first viewing very conventional representations. When Italian painting developed a taste for enigma, considerably later, it most often showed in secular compositions influenced by Renaissance Neo-Platonism.

From the 15th century religious painting gradually freed itself from the habit of following earlier compositional models, and by the 16th century ambitious artists were expected to find novel compositions for each subject, and direct borrowings from earlier artists are more often of the poses of individual figures than of whole compositions. The Reformation soon restricted most Protestant religious painting to Biblical scenes conceived along the lines of history painting, and after some decades the Catholic Council of Trent reined in somewhat the freedom of Catholic artists.

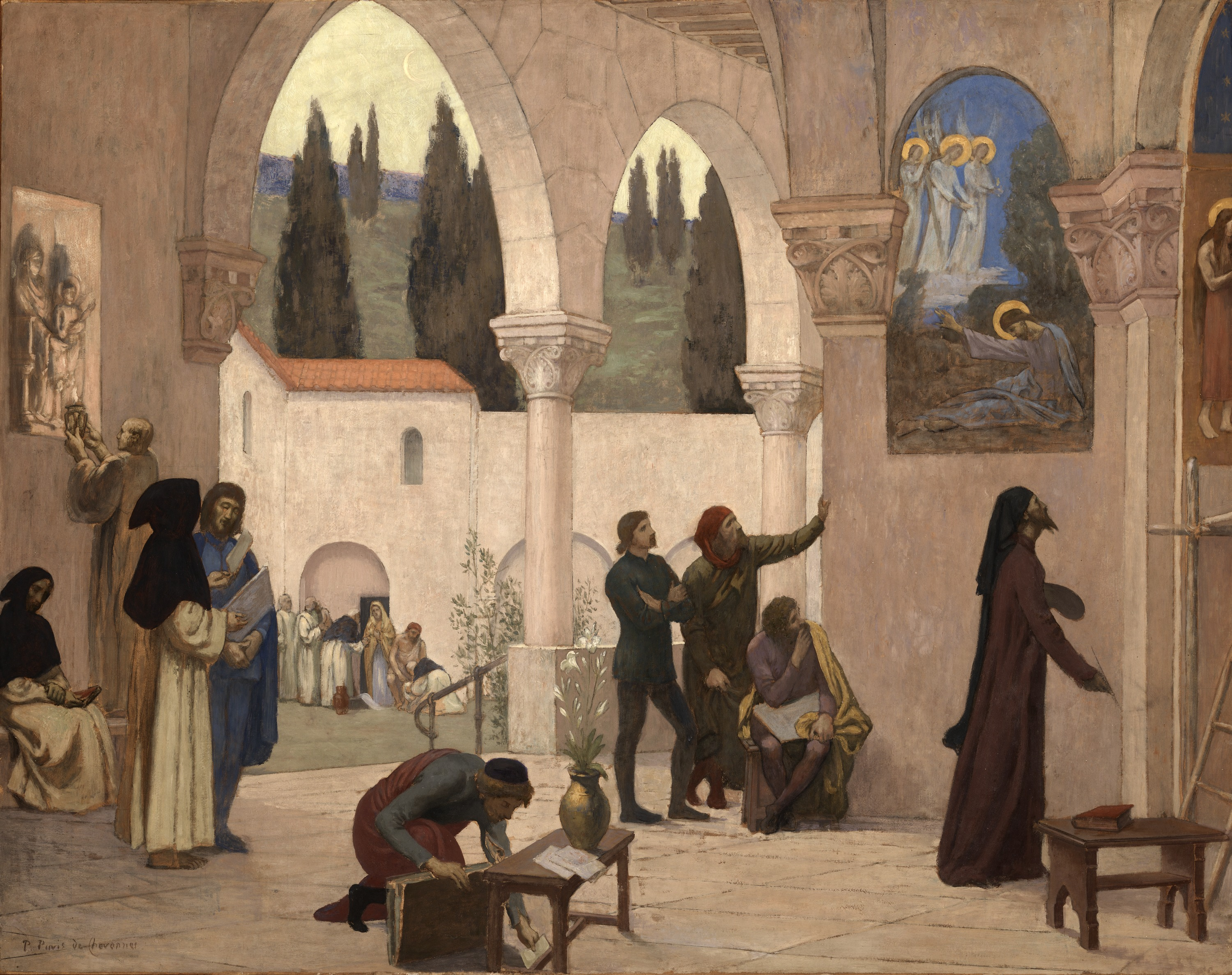
Roman Catholic monks painting icons on the wall of an abbey in France

=== Secular Western art ===
Secular painting became far more common in the West from the Renaissance, and developed its own traditions and conventions of iconography, in history painting, which includes mythologies, portrait paintings, genre paintings, and even landscape paintings, not to mention modern media and genres like photography, film, political cartoons, and comic books.

Renaissance mythological painting was in theory reviving the iconography of its Classical antiquity, but in practice themes like Leda and the Swan developed on largely original lines, and for different purposes. Personal iconographies, where works appear to have significant meanings individual to, and perhaps only accessible by, the artist, go back at least as far as Hieronymous Bosch, but have become increasingly significant with artists like Francisco Goya, William Blake, Paul Gauguin, Picasso, Frida Kahlo, and Joseph Beuys.

== In disciplines other than art history ==
Iconography, often of aspects of popular culture, is a concern of other academic disciplines including Semiotics, Anthropology, Sociology, Media Studies, Communication Studies, and Cultural Studies. These analyses in turn have affected conventional art history, especially concepts such as signs in semiotics. Discussing imagery as iconography in this way implies a critical "reading" of imagery that often attempts to explore social and cultural values. Iconography is also used within film studies to describe the visual language of cinema, particularly within the field of genre criticism. In the age of Internet, the new global history of the visual production of Humanity (Histiconologia) includes History of Art and history of all kind of images or medias.

Contemporary iconography research often draws on theories of visual framing to address such diverse issues as the iconography of climate change created by different stakeholders, the iconography that international organizations create about natural disasters, the iconography of epidemics disseminated in the press, and the iconography of suffering found in social media.

An iconography study in communication science analyzed stock photos used in press reporting to depict the social issue of child sexual abuse. Based on a sample of N=1,437 child sexual abuse (CSA) online press articles that included 419 stock photos, a CSA iconography (i.e. a set of typical image motifs for a topic) was revealed that relate to criminal reporting: The CSA iconography visualizes 1. crime contexts, 2. course of the crime and people involved, and 3. consequences of the crime for the people involved (e.g., image motif: perpetrator in handcuffs).

== Articles with iconographical analysis of individual works ==
- Castelseprio frescoes
- The Flagellation by Piero della Francesca
- The Wilton Diptych
- The Mérode Altarpiece by Robert Campin
- Madonna of Chancellor Rolin, Arnolfini Portrait, Annunciation, all by Jan van Eyck
- Virgin and Child Enthroned by Rogier van der Weyden
- The Magdalen Reading by Rogier van der Weyden
- Saint Jerome in His Study by Antonello da Messina
- Two Venetian Ladies and Saint Augustine in His Study by Vittore Carpaccio
- Melencolia I by Albrecht Dürer
- Marie de' Medici cycle by Rubens
- Ivan Rutkovych

== Examples ==
- Hindu iconography
- Urban iconography

== See also ==
- Saint symbolism
- Metanarrative
