= María Luisa Bemberg =

Argentine film director, screenwriter and actress (1922–1995)

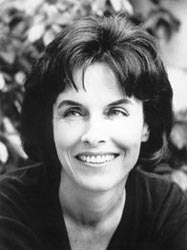
- María Luisa Bemberg
- Born: 14 April 1922; Buenos Aires, Argentina
- Died: 7 May 1995 (aged 73); Buenos Aires, Argentina
- Occupations: Film director Screenwriter
- Years active: 1959–1995

María Luisa Bemberg (April 14, 1922 – May 7, 1995) was an Argentine screenwriter, film director and actress. She was one of the first Argentine female directors with a powerful presence both in the filmmaking and the intellectual world of Latin America, particularly during her most active period, from 1970 to 1990.

In her work, she specialized in portraying famous Argentine women and the Argentine upper class. Bemberg also focused on feminism, with regard to the gender debate and cinematic gaze. Her vast legacy extends to the 21st Century, with Bemberg being hailed as arguably Argentina’s foremost female director.

== Biography ==
=== Early years ===
The daughter of Otto Eduardo Bemberg and Sofía Bengolea, she was born into one of the most powerful and wealthy families of Argentina. Her great-grandfather, German Argentine immigrant Otto Bemberg founded the largest brewery Quilmes Brewery in 1888. Bemberg grew up in a wealthy family. Bemberg never received a high school diploma or a college degree. She was privately tutored by a governess.

On October 17, 1945, she married Carlos Miguens, an architect. Following their marriage and in the midst of the Juan Perón era, the couple moved to Spain, where they had four children before returning to Argentina. One of them, Carlos Miguens Bemberg, would become a well-known businessman. 10 years later she divorced Miguens. Her partner in subsequent years was film producer Oscar Kramer.

=== Artistic career ===
In 1949, Bemberg became involved with the previously named Smart Theater and later renamed the Astral Theater. In 1959, she established and managed Buenos Aires's Teatro Del Globo with her associate, Catalina Wolff. She was one of the founders of the Mar del Plata Film Festival and the Feminist Union in Argentina. Her original efforts to form feminist groups were muffled by the military regime that superseded Perón in the mid-1950s. Bemberg was inspired by French novelist and art theorist André Malraux, who visited her aunt's Villa Ocampo in 1959, and particularly his belief that "one must live what one believes".

In 1970, she wrote the script for Raúl de la Torre's Crónica de una señora, a successful film about the Argentine upper class with Graciela Borges and Lautaro Murúa, and in 1975 the script for Fernando Ayala's Triangle of Four. After her film Señora de nadie was censored by the military regime, she went to New York to study acting from Lee Strasberg. Bemberg used that time to understand how to approach a film from an actor's perspective.

In 1971, Bemberg teamed up with another feminist to create the UFA (Union Feminista Argentina). Though the UFA disbanded after two years due to government enforced curfews, the impact made by the meetings was important because it was a way for young women to explore feminist thought in a time where divorce was difficult, abortion was illegal, and women's shelters were non existent.

Bemberg decided to pursue directing because she was disappointed with how her semi-autobiographical screenplays were interpreted by male directors. Bemberg states "I realized the story belongs to the director rather than the screenwriter, so I decided to direct." She believed that Argentine men suffered from great insecurity and Latin American films portrayed women poorly, and wanted to change what she felt was an uninteresting image of women in Latin American cinema. She founded her own production company, GEA, with Lita Stantic and directed her first film, Momentos, which was self-financed, in 1981.

Among her films, she wrote and directed Señora de nadie in 1982, Camila in 1984 (about the persecution and execution of a priest and his lover ordered by Argentine military officer and politician Juan Manuel de Rosas and nominated for the Academy Award for Best Foreign Language Film), Miss Mary in 1986 (featuring British actress Julie Christie), and Yo, la peor de todas in 1990 (about the life of Juana Inés de la Cruz, with French actress Dominique Sanda, Argentine actor Héctor Alterio and Spanish actress Assumpta Serna). Bemberg's films were widely popular due to their melodramatic elements (such as Camila), and enjoyed much commercial success. Throughout her career Bemberg worked with longtime producer Lita Stantic, costume designer Graciela Galan and Voytec, a London-based stage design firm.

==== Camila ====
Camila was the third film that Bemberg directed as well as her first film to gain international recognition. In 1984 Camila was the biggest box-office hit in Argentina's history. Her longtime producer Lita Stantic brought her a copy of a novel by Enrique Molina based on the life of Argentine socialite Camila O'Gorman. Stantic wanted Bemberg to prove that she could tell a love story. Bemberg was interested in showing Camila as the active pursuer in her relationship and spurning the pillars of family, church and state, freed from what she thought was a role that historians had confined her to. Bemberg was only able to make the film after President Raúl Alfonsín outlawed film censorship in 1983, making it a political statement as much as it is a romantic fiction. Despite the romantic plot led by the Camila and Ladislao Gutierrez, the Jesuit priest, the film is distinct for its unromantic end in the midst of the dictatorship of Juan Manuel de Rosas. The film cost US$370,000 to make.

=== Last years and death ===
Her last film was 1993's De eso no se habla, starring Italian actor Marcello Mastroianni.

At the end of her life, Bemberg was working on a script, based on the story El impostor by Silvina Ocampo, a distant relative of hers, which was made into a film in 1997 directed by her longtime collaborator Alejandro Maci.

Before her death, she bequeathed her personal art collection to the National Museum of Fine Arts. She died of cancer in Buenos Aires on May 7, 1995, at age 73.

== Themes ==
Scholar Bruce Williams has stated that all of Bemberg's films show female protagonists transgressing the boundaries and limits of their societies. Her feminist films depict women struggling to assume their place in patriarchal settings. With respect to the formal aspects of her films, Bemberg set her own aesthetics, such as the "woman's look", which she considered was lacking in films and especially in Latin American films.

In several interviews Bemberg said that she was inspired by New Zealand producer and director Jane Campion and in particular her movie The Piano. Eroticism, female sexuality and women were some of Campion's themes that Bemberg was most interested in. In an interview Bemberg described why Campion's films were so inspirational for her: "In most films, eroticism for the most part is portrayed from a masculine viewpoint. They speak of their sexual prowess, conquests but--excuse me, I'm going to be very crude--rarely do they mention their inadequacies, problems with erections, impotence. Of that they don't speak. On the other hand, it's my impression that if a woman doesn't reach marriage as a virgin, well... But now it seems to me women are beginning to speak out beyond just talking to one another. It's very refreshing: observing events from a different angle."

Film scholars have noted that Bemberg's entire body of work contains autobiographical elements.

Not all of Bemberg's films were focused on historical events and when they did, Bemberg explains in an interview, she intended to "situate the viewer in the period. What interests me is the human beings, not the meticulous and obsessive reconstruction of facsimiles of their surroundings."

In the book, Notable Twentieth-century Latin American Women: A Biographical Dictionary Bemberg explains the development of her character, Sor Juana in the film I, the Worst of All (Yo, la peor de todas). Bemberg based Yo, la peor de todas on the Mexican writer Octavio Paz’s work, Sor Juana Ines de la Cruz, o las trampas de la fe. In this book, it is said Sor Juana’s character also reflected parts of Bemberg’s personal life, “Both women (Bemberg and the character, Sor Juana) were self-taught, transgressive, and devoted to their work. Sor Juana was one of the most illustrious voices of the Spanish Baroque; Bemberg was the first Argentine woman who developed a movie career from her personal point of view.”

== Filmography ==
| Year | Film | Credited as | | |
| Year | Film | Director | Writer | Actor |
|---|---|---|---|---|
| 1971 | Chronicle of a Lady (Crónica de una señora) | No | Yes | No |
| 1972 | El mundo de la mujer | Yes | Yes | No |
| 1975 | Triangle of Four (Triángulo de cuatro) | No | Yes | No |
| 1978 | Juguetes | Yes | Yes | No |
| 1981 | Momentos | Yes | Yes | No |
| 1982 | Nobody's Wife (Señora de nadie) | Yes | Yes | No |
| 1984 | Camila | Yes | Yes | No |
| 1986 | Miss Mary | Yes | Yes | No |
| 1990 | I, the Worst of All (Yo, la peor de todas) | Yes | Yes | No |
| 1993 | I Don't Want to Talk About It (De eso no se habla) | Yes | Yes | No |
| 1994 | La balada de Donna Helena | No | No | Yes |
| 1997 | The Impostor (El impostor) | No | Yes | No |

== Awards ==
Two of her films were featured at the Venice Film Festival.

Camila was nominated for an Oscar for Best Foreign Film.

Señora de nadie was featured at the Taormina and Panama Film Festival.

Miss Mary received honorary mentions at the Tokyo and Venice Film Festivals.

She received Konex Awards in 1984 and 1991 and the Honour Konex in 2001, and multiple awards in international film festivals.

She also participated as a jury at the festivals of Cartagena, Berlin, Chicago and Venice.
