= Otto Bemberg =

Argentine businessman

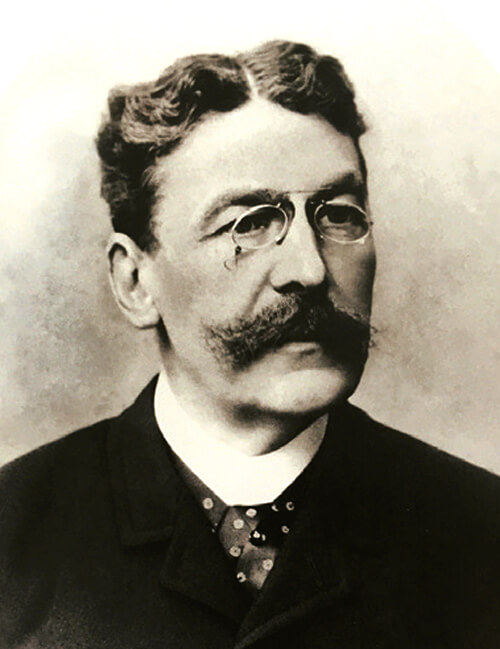
- Born: 1827; Cologne, Germany
- Died: March 2, 1895 (aged 67–68); Paris, France
- Occupation: Businessman
- Known for: Founder of Cerveza Quilmes

Otto Bemberg (May 1, 1827 – March 2, 1895) was a German Argentine businessman prominent in the development of early Argentine industry. He is mostly notable for having been the founder of Cervecería y Maltería Quilmes, the largest brewery in the country.

== Biography ==
Otto Peter Friedrich Bemberg was born in Cologne, Germany, in 1827. He emigrated to Argentina in 1850 and married María Luisa Ocampo, the daughter of prominent local landowners and developers. He established an import-export firm specializing in the import of textile products and the export of local cereals for the European market. In 1860 he was appointed Consul General in Paris, where the couple remained until 1867.

On the eve of his departure, Bemberg established his first manufacturing firm, the Franco Argentina Brewery; his father, Pedro Bemberg Boullé, had been partly of French descent. In Paris, he also established the Brasserie Argentine Societé Anonyme ("Argentine Brewing, Inc.") and later had his son, Otto Sebastián, enroll at the Technical University of Munich, where he became a trained brewer.

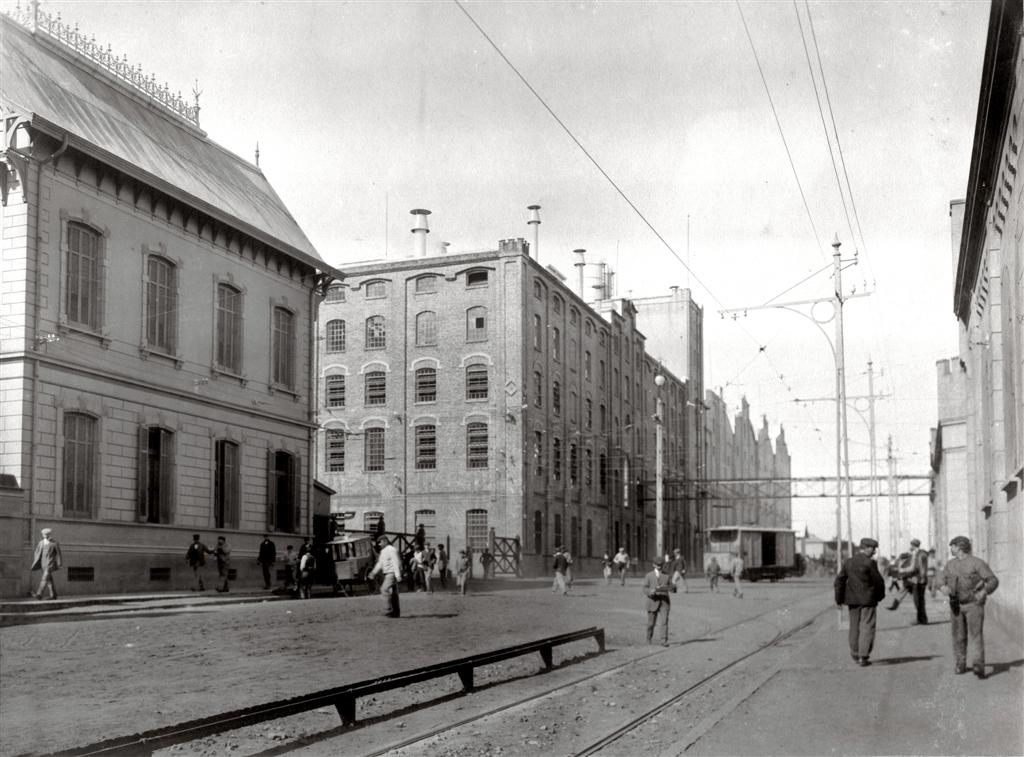
The Quilmes Brewery, around the time of its 1890 inaugural

Bemberg obtained commissions from Presidents Bartolomé Mitre and Nicolás Avellaneda for the establishment of agricultural colonies in the then-practically undeveloped Santa Fe Province, the site of some of the country's most productive cropland. Retaining financial interests in Paris, he and his son established the Brasserie Argentine Quilmes (Quilmes Brewery) in 1890, and inaugurated its brewing and bottling plant in the company's namesake, the southern Buenos Aires suburb of Quilmes. The facility was the largest and most advanced in Argentina, and soon eclipsed its main competitor, the Bieckert Brewery. Bemberg died in Paris in 1896 and his son, Otto Sebastián, led the company to a dominant position in its local market; his younger son, Herman Bemberg, remained in Paris and became a noted French composer.

Otto Sebastián's son, Otto Eduardo (1887–1984), went on to take the Bemberg dynasty to its zenith in the mid-20th century. In August 1929, aged 42, he reportedly had a premonition about the Wall Street crash in his sleep, which he quickly acted upon. He sold all his shares and bought 400 tons of gold just in time, a move which undoubtedly saved his family from financial ruin. Nonetheless, when he broke the good news to his father, Otto Sebastián simply replied "I knew you would". By the 1960s, noticing the diminished drive in his subsequent generations who had been born into unprecedented wealth, he said to one of his grandchildren "it is easier to make a fortune than it is to maintain it".

One of Bemberg's five children, María Luisa Bemberg, went on to become a successful film director in Argentina from 1980 until her death in 1995. Her son, Carlos Miguens Bemberg was the last member of the Bemberg family to sell their stake in the Cervecería Quilmes in 2006, 116 years after its foundation.
