= Protomedicato del Río de la Plata =

Protomedicato del Río de la Plata was a hospital in Buenos Aires, Argentina, and was the institution responsible for health and medical training in the country from 1779 until the early 1820s.
