= Urban iconography =

Urban iconography is a branch of iconography, a term used both extensively, to mean a collection of illustrations of a specific subject and, within art history, the study of the subject matter of figurative representations. Iconology is more specifically concerned with the interpretation of the same subject matter. According to Erwin Panofsky iconography aims to identify the primary and secondary subject matter, and therefore "in doing so, iconography is an invaluable help for the establishment of dates, provenance and, occasionally, authenticity; and it furnishes the necessary basis for all further interpretation". Urban iconography is focused on the city, a complex and dynamic artifact, whose forms are a transparent medium of social ideas, individual and collective needs, like dwelling or gathering for religious, economic or political purposes, needs to which different societies gave different answers. To interpret town images correctly, it is necessary to understand the urban mechanisms of evolution, as well as urban culture. On the other hand, the image itself is part of the wider history of figurative handcrafts, and therefore. deciphering its representative code is essential to guarantee a proper interpretation and a proper use.

== Urban iconography as a methodology for research ==
The study of urban iconography developed in the last thirty years indifferent contexts, but mainly inside studies in urban history, among which it appeared as one of the most innovative approaches. After the exploration and the surveys of the iconography of single towns, research shifted to methodology, language, techniques, instruments, the relationship between word and image and between material structure and representation. Promising research fields are opening up through the use of computer data processing, and the comparative study on the representation of urban space seems to be one of the next frontiers. Town representation is no longer studied as source material for the study of urban history, but become a research field in itself, one that has to find its proper place in the history of culture.

== Foundations of Urban Iconography ==
Collections of images of single towns began to appear the beginning of the twentieth century, but more recently urban iconography has been recognized as a methodology of research. After the publication of the "Atlante" ( Storia d'Italia series, Einaudi, Turin, 1976) and the launching of the series "Le città nella storia d'Italia" (Bari, Laterza, 1980) aimed at investigating the relationship between towns developments and their iconography, research took new directions. The subject has been discussed in conferences and round tables, the proceedings of some of which are now available. Papers focused on urban iconography were presented in sessions of the biennial "International Conferences on the History of Cartography." Many medium-sized cities began to encourage catalogues of their own iconography, and museum exhibitions, that were sometimes extended to wider contexts and accompanied by rich catalogues. In the Eighties the subject has found its own space within studies in topographic cartography, but it’s only in the Nineties that it has been widely explored and the materials collected have been sufficiently abundant to allow the first synthesis to be outlined: Paul D.A. Harvey, The history of Topographical Maps: Symbols, Pictures and Surveys, Thames and Hudson, London 1980; Lucia Nuti, Ritratti di città.Visione e memoria tra Medioevo e Settecento, Marsilio, Venezia 1996; Cesare De Seta, Ritratti di città. Dal Rinascimento al secolo XVIII, Einaudi, Torino 2011; H. Ballon, D. Friedman, Portraying the City in Early Modern Europe: Measurement, Representation, and Planning, in Cartography in the European Renaissance, a cura di. D. Woodward, Chicago University press, Chicago-London 2007, pp. 680–704; Lucia Nuti, Cartografie senza carte. Lo spazio urbano descritto dal Medioevo al Rinascimento, Jaca Book, Milano 2008.

== Online archives ==
At the moment many images of cities are available on line, at high and low resolution, but without any historical information. Two websites were created: one belonging to the Centro Interdipartimentale di Ricerca sull’Iconografia della Città Europea of Naples and the other, the "Atlante storico-iconografico delle città toscan" hosted by the Università di Pisa.

== Bibliography ==
- Paul D.A. Harvey, The history of Topographical Maps: Symbols, Pictures and Surveys, Thames and Hudson, London 1980.
- Lucia Nuti, Ritratti di città. Visione e memoria tra Medioevo e Settecento, Marsilio, Venezia 1996.
- Cesare De Seta, Ritratti di città. Dal Rinascimento al secolo XVIII, Einaudi, Torino 2011.
- H.Ballon, D.Friedman, Portraying the City in Early Modern Europe: Measurement, Representation, and Planning, in Cartography in the European Renaissance, a cura di. D.Woodward, Chicago University press, Chicago - London 2007, pp. 680–704.
- Lucia Nuti, Cartografie senza carte. Lo spazio urbano descritto dal Medioevo al Rinascimento, Jaca Book, Milano 2008.
