= Jesús Mari Lazkano =

Spanish Basque painter (born 1960)

Jesús Mari Lazkano (born 1960, in Bergara) is a Spanish Basque painter. He graduated in fine arts from the University of the Basque Country, where he is Professor of Fine Arts, and has had exhibitions in Europe, America and Asia. Some of his work is part of the Bilbao Guggenheim Museum collection.

Along with Jose Venero, he made the movie Artiko, which was selected to appear at the In The Palace International Short Film Festival in Varna, Bulgaria, and the Ulju Mountain Film Festival, South Korea.

== One-man shows ==
- 2018 ARCTIC, short movie, Signo Digital Productions.
- 2017 The Arctic Circle, Scientific-artistic expedition to the Arctic, Svalbard; Bilbao Art Fair Lumbreras Gallery
- 2016 Two worlds. Site Specific, Smithsonian Folklife Festival, Washington; Ikusmira. Retrospective Exhibition. Kursaal San Sebastian; Natura, Aoiz Art Center, Navarra; Bilbao Art Fair, Windsor Gallery
- 2014 Chair-man Gallery Beijing, China; Natura Imaginis, Altxerri Gallery, San Sebastian
- 2012 798 Art Bridge Gallery Beijing China
- 2010 From architecture to nature Museo de Bellas Artes de Bilbao
- 2008 From the memory Museo Euskal Herria, Gernika
- 2007 Laboratory, Guggenheim Museum Bilbao Galleria Il Polittico, Roma
- 2006 Windsor Kulturgintza, Bilbao
- 2005 Galería Antonio Machon, Madrid.
- 2004 Galleria Il Polittico, Roma
- 2003 Retrospective 1989-2003, Fundación BBK, Bilbao; Galería SEI, Pamplona.
- 2002 Galería Antonio Machón, Madrid.
- 2001 Galleria Il Polittico, Roma.
- 2000 Galería Antonio de Barnola, Barcelona.
- 1999 The Times, Sala Rekalde, Bilbao Galería Antonio Machón. Madrid.
- 1998 From the beauty to the useful, International industrial architecture seminary Palacio Montehermoso. Vitoria.
- 1997 Sala Artxibo Foral, Retrospective 1984 -1989, BilbaoLe 29º Festival; International de la Pinture, Cagnes-sur-Mer, Francia; Galería Dieciseis, San Sebastián.
- 1996 Adams Middleton Gallery, Dallas, USA; Windsor Kulturgintza, Bilbao.
- 1995 Embassy Gallery, Yakarta, Indonesia. Galería Antonio Machón, Madrid.
- 1993 Galería Antonio Machón, Madrid.ARCO"93, ART FAIR Galería Antonio Machón, Madrid.
- 1992 Adams-Midleton Gallery, Dallas, USACollection DOBE, Monte Bre, Lugano, Suiza.
- 1991 CHICAGO ART FAIR, Galería Michel Chenau, Collection DOBE, Chicago.
- 1990 Mural for the underground of Bilbao, 600m. squaresGalería Antonio Machón, Madrid; Windsor Kulturgintza, Bilbao.
- 1989 Galería Antonio Machón, Madrid.
- 1988 Galería Dieciseis, San Sebastián. Sala BBK, Bilbao.
- 1987 Galería Gamarra Garrigues, Madrid.
- 1986 Herrikasarte, Munguía.
- 1985 Sala Ezkurdi, Durango. Galería Dieciseis, San Sebastián.
- 1984 Sala Gran Vía, 21, Bilbao.
- 1983 ARTEDER-83, Bilbao; Windsor Kulturgintza, Bilbao; Sala Kutxa, San Sebastián, Azpeitia

== Public paintings ==
- 2011 Natura Imaginis, 6 x 15 metres. IBERDROLA Tower, Cesar Pelli architect, Bilbao.
- 2010 BILBO MMX, 125 x 720 cm. Stand Bilbao, EXPO SHANGAI 2010
- 2009 Project for the Matadero Bridge, Madrid, with the Adrian Geuze's Studio West 8 Urban Design &Landscape Architecture de Rotterdam
- 2007 Leioatik-Leioara. 125 x 650 cm Kultur Etxea, Leioa Hemendik nora eta nola, Two pieces of 200 x 2.000 cm. Aula Magna of University of the Basque Country, Bilbao.
- 2006 Water tank of Gernika, 500 x 8.400 cm, Water consortium of Busturialdea, Gernika “Busturialdea”, Gernika.
- 2005 Paisaje de paso, 4 pieces of 800 x 200 cm. Intermodal of San Mames, Renfe Bilbao; Bizkaia, 3 x 5 meters. Bilbao Exhibition Center, Barakaldo.
- 2002 From the relative or the place of the memory 3,5 x 12 meters. Palacio de Música y Congresos Euskalduna, Bilbao; Arriaga´s dream, 3 x 5 meters. Tram of Bilbao Euskotran,. Temporal installation.
- 2001 Euskadi, 244 x 530 cm. Basque Parliament, Vitoria-Gazteiz
- 1996 Roof mural of the Argentaria's foundation library, Madrid.
- 1991 Realization of 4 stamps for the post: Spanish Bank, Alvaro de Bazán, Fuente de Apolo, and San Isidro institute, due to Madrid being European culture capital. “Ed. Casa de la Moneda y Timbre”, Madrid.
- 1990 Hemendik nora, 10 x 60 meters, Mural for the Bilbao underground. Demolished

== Public collections and museums ==
- Guggenheim Museum. Bilbao.
- Château du Montbeliard Museum, France.
- Bvlgary Collection, Hong Kong, Los Angeles.
- Collection DOBE, Lugano, Suiza.
- Financial Corporation Washington.
- Spanish academy of Fine Arts, Roma.
- Fine Arts Museum of Bilbao.
- Artium Museum, Vitoria.
- Col. Goldman Saatchi, Madrid.
- Col. Testimoni. La Caixa, Barcelona.
- Col. BBVA. Madrid.
- San Telmo Museum, San Sebastian.
- Basque Government, Vitoria.
- Youth Institute, Madrid.
- Col. Caja Postal. Madrid.
- Col. Bilbao Undergrown.
- Patio Herreriano Museum, Valladolid.
- Col. Ajuriaenea palace, Vitoria.
- Col. Argentaria Foundation, Madrid.
- Col. Athletic Club de Bilbao.
- Casa de la Moneda y Timbre, Madrid.
- Museo Municipal Madrid.
- BSCH Foundation. Santander.
- Basque Parliament, Vitoria.
- Opera House, Bilbao.
- Bilbao Exhibition Center.
- Euskaltel, Derio.

== Prizes and grants ==
- 2007 “Titanio” prize. Basque and Navarre architecture's college “Ria del ocio” Prize
- 2001 First “Vacamanía” Prize, Bilbao
- 1997 Spanish Academy of Roma scholarship
- 1995 Scholarship from the Spanish embassy of Indonesia
- 1991 Premio Ibérico Dos Mil. “Ibérico Dos Mil” Prize
- 1990 Artistic creation “Banesto” Grant
- 1988 Basque Government Grant
- 1987 II Prize of engravings “Gure Artea”
- 1986 “Caja de Ahorros Vizcaina” GrantYoung art Prize, Culture Department, Madrid.
- 1985 First Prize “Gure Artea” “Adquisición Bizkaiko Artea” Prize
- 1984 Basque Government Grant First “Bienal of Basque Art” Prize, Amorebieta.
- 1983 Artistic creation Grant, Delegation of Gipuzkoa
- 1982 First prize for the Young Artists, San Sebastian

== Courses and conferences ==
- Teacher of the Master in Research on the territory and the landscape, University of Elche, Spain
- Teacher of the Master in Research and creation of art, University of the Basque Country
- Urban iconographies. In architecture and society, Official College of Architecture Basque and Navarre, Bilbao, July 2007
- From the process, Practice course, Guggenheim Museum, Bilbao, 2007
- Ruins of the contemporary painting, University of Kiel, Germany, 2006
- My painting and the city. Literature and the city. Theory and practice application; XXV Summer courses – XVIII European Courses of the UPV San Sebastian, 2006
- Organization of a cycle of conferences Landscapes, which landscapes? Bilboarte centre. Bilbao, April–May 2002
- Art and nature. The garden like an art. From 15−19 September, Department of the History Art, Philosophy and Literature Faculty of Zaragoza. Huesca, 1997
- Doctoral courses Creación e investigación en Arte. Pintura. 1994-2010
- 11/4 International industrial architecture's seminary. From 7−27 September. Area of urban renewal of Vitoria, Department of urbanism of the delegation of Araba and department of order of the Basque Government territory
- Doctoral courses Research and creation of art. Painting. 1994−2010

== Lectures ==
- About the creative process. Architecture School Tongji University. Shanghai. 2011
- From the architecture to the nature. Fine Arts Museum, Bilbao. 2011
- Landscape, city, painting, Fine Arts Faculty, University of Warsaw, Poland, 2010
- Landscape, city, painting, University of Art and Design, Helsinki, 2008
- “Art between us” Inaugural lecture for the official opening ceremony of the course 2007-8. University of the Basque Country, 2007
- “Progetto pittorico”, Fine Arts academy of Venice, 2007
- Architectonic report, “Titanio prize”, Architecture Basque and Navarre Collage, Bilbao, 2007
- Ideal topographies, Guggenheim Museum, Bilbao, 2007
- Readings in Arquiesculture, Guggenheim Museum Bilbao, December 2005
- “Switching on words in a paper”, Oteiza other. Guggenheim Museum Bilbao, December 2004
- Landscape and painting. Philosophy Faculty. University of Deusto. Bilbao. 2002
- The garden like the laboratory or a natural geometry. Postgrade courses of Art and Nature, the garden like an art. Huesca, Spain, 1997
- From the way of expression of a province painter, Argentaria Foundation, Bilbao. February, 1996
- From how to reduce the distances or the painting like an antidote. Real Sociedad Bascongada de Amigos del País Delegación en Corte, Madrid. November, 1994

== Books and catalogues of one-man shows ==
- Landscape soul, Ed. 798 Bridge Gallery Beijing China
- From architecture to nature Ed. Museo de Bellas Artes de Bilbao
- Lazkano Cuaderno de Notas Ed. Museo de Bellas Artes de Bilbao
- “Desde la Pintura” en RIEV JOURNAL, Eusko Ikaskuntza, 51-52, pag 241-334, Bilbao, 2007
- Natura dello of Lorenzo Canova, Ed. Il Político, Roma, 2007. spazio, introduction
- Roma-New York, introducción Arnaldo Romani Brizzi, Ed. Il Polittico, Roma, 2004
- Catálogo Razonado LAZKANO 1989-2002. Kosme de Barañano. Ed BBK, Bilbao, 2003
- ROMA, facsímil Italian notebook drawings . Ed. Bassarai, Vitoria, 2003.
- El espejo transparente, introduction, author's texts. Ed. Antonio Machón, Madrid. 2002.
- Roma Veduta, introduction Edward Lucie-Smith, Ed. Il Político, Roma, 2001.
- De las Formas Simples, introduction Juan Manuel Bonet and text of Jesús Mari Lazkano. Ed. Antonio de Barnola. Barcelona. 2000.
- De los tiempos, essay of Fernando Castro, Ed. Rekalde, June, July, August, 1999, Bilbao
- Ars Fragmentaria, introduction Kosme de Barañano and text Jesús Mari Lazkano. Ed. Galería Antonio Machón, Madrid, 1999.
- De lo bello y lo útil o recorrido pictórico por algunas ruinas de la industria vizcaína y otros pueblos. Jesús Mari Lazkano 1984-1989. introduction Javier González de Durana, September−October 1997. Ed. Diputación Foral de Bizkaia, Bilbao, 1997.
- De la memoria, author's texts, Ed. Windsor Kulturgintza, Bilbao, 1997.
- Del Orden Natural, author's texts, October–November, 1995. Ed. Galería Antonio Machón, Madrid, 1996.
- La Gran Utopía, introducción del author, January–February, 1993. Ed. Galería Antonio Machón. Madrid, 1996.
- Cuaderno de Notas, facsímil New York drawings, introduction Antonio Bonet. Ed. Haizegoa, Bilbao, 1992.
- Jesús Mari Lazkano, (separata), Catálogo Nacional de Arte Contemporáneo 1991-1992 IBERICOÊ2 MIL, introduction Miguel Zugaza, Barcelona, 1992.
- Viena-Nueva York, author's texts. Ed. Galería Windsor Kulturgintza, Bilbao, May,1990.
- Jesús Mari Lazkano, introduction Jon Juaristi. Ed. Galería Antonio Machón, Madrid, April–May, 1989.
- Catálogo razonado, 1977-1988, (separata), Kobie N1/4 5, serie Bellas Artes, introduction Javier González de Durana. Ed. Diputación Foral de Bizkaia, Bilbao, 1988.
- Jesús Mari Lazkano. PAINTINGS, introduction Javier González de Durana. Ed. Caja de Ahorros Vizcaína, Bilbao, 1988.
- Lazkano. Ed. Galería Gamarra - Garrigues, Madrid, May, 1987.
- Jesús Mari Lazkano. Margoak - Pinturas, introduction Txema Exparta. Ed. Caja de Ahorros Vizcaína, Bilbao, May, 1984.
- Bueno..., Ed. Jesús Mari Lazkano y Joseba Macías, Bilbao, 1982.
