= Cerveza Quilmes =

Argentine drink company

Cervecería y Maltería Quilmes
- Type: Private (1890–2002); Subsidiary (2002–present)
- Industry: Beverage
- Founded: 1890; 136 years ago
- Founder: Otto Bemberg
- Fate: Acquired by Ambev in 2002
- Headquarters: Quilmes, Argentina
- Products: Beer, bottled water, soft drinks, energy drinks, wine
- Owner: Ambev (91%); Quinsa (9%) (Note: "Quinsa" (acronym for "Quilmes Industrial S.A."), private consortium formed by the Bemberg, Miguens, and De Ganay families.)
- Parent: Ambev
- Website: cerveceriaymalteriaquilmes.com

Cervecería y Maltería Quilmes (locally [seɾβeseˈɾi.aj malteˈɾi.a ˈkilmes]) is an Argentine drink company founded in 1890 in the city of Quilmes in Greater Buenos Aires. The company was established by Otto Bemberg, a German immigrant, in 1890 as a beer manufacturer. Since 2002, Quilmes is owned by Ambev, the largest beer manufacturer in the world.

Apart from beer, the company bottles and commercialises bottled waters, soft drinks, sport drinks, energy drinks, and wines, through several brands (some of them properties of parent company Ambev and other brands under licenses of PepsiCo and Nestlé, among others).

Quilmes has manufactured several varieties of beer through the years, such as low-alcohol, bock, stout, lager, red lager, lager, and pilsner. Quilmes is the largest beer manufacturer of Argentina.

== History ==
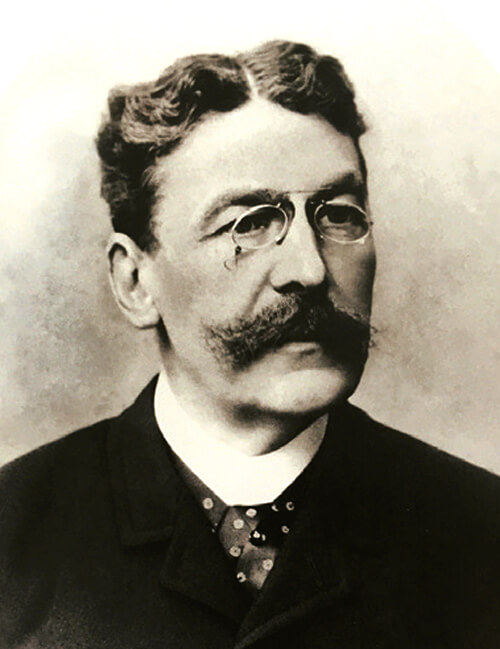
German-Argentine businessman Otto Bemberg founded the company in 1890

Immigrant Otto Bemberg, who had arrived in Argentina in 1852, established a brewery in the city of Quilmes in 1890. His product was marketed under the Quilmes name, which was the former indigenous denomination of the city. The company donated money to build the Quilmes hospital in 1918.

The company grew quickly, and by the 1920s it was the most popular beer brand in Buenos Aires. Since then, it has become something of a national symbol and has 75% of the beer market share in Argentina. It sponsored the Argentina national football team, and the colours of its labels are Argentina's light blue and white.

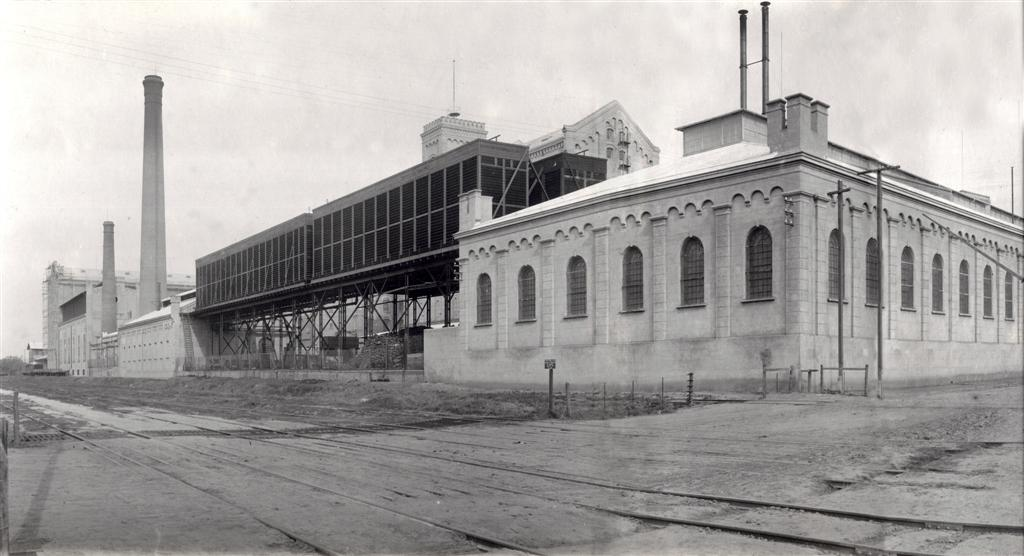
The Quilmes brewery c. 1910

Logo of the company used until 2020. Since then, it remained as the Quilmes beer brand logo

In 1993, the company launched Liberty, the first non-alcohol beer in Argentina, and four years later, the Quilmes Light, a low-alcohol version. By 1998, Quilmes beers exported to the U.S. and Europe In 1999, Quilmes acquired Baesa, the largest Pepsi plant in Argentina.

In 2002, Brazilian company Ambev bought 37.5% of Quilmes S.A. for US$600 million in an agreement that gave Ambev control of the Quilmes brand in Argentina. The merger of the two companies created, for a brief time, the world's third-largest beverage producer.

As of 2005, Quilmes had plants in Quilmes, Zárate, Tres Arroyos, Corrientes, Tucumán, and Mendoza. It is also exported to Brazil, Peru, Ecuador, Mexico, Honduras, Costa Rica, Nicaragua, Puerto Rico, the United States, Spain, Israel, Dominican Republic, France, the United Kingdom, Italy, Australia, and several other countries. It sold a yearly total of around 17 million hectolitres of beer and 8 million hL of soft drinks and other products.

In 2006 Ambev increased its share of the company to over 91%, effectively taking full control of the Quilmes name for US$1.2 billion. In total, Ambev paid US$1.8 billion for the company.

In February 2020, Quilmes entered to the wine market after acquiring Dante Robino winery in Luján de Cuyo in Mendoza Province.

== Products and brands ==
As of September 2021, Cervecería y Maltería Quilmes bottles and markets the following line of drink products:

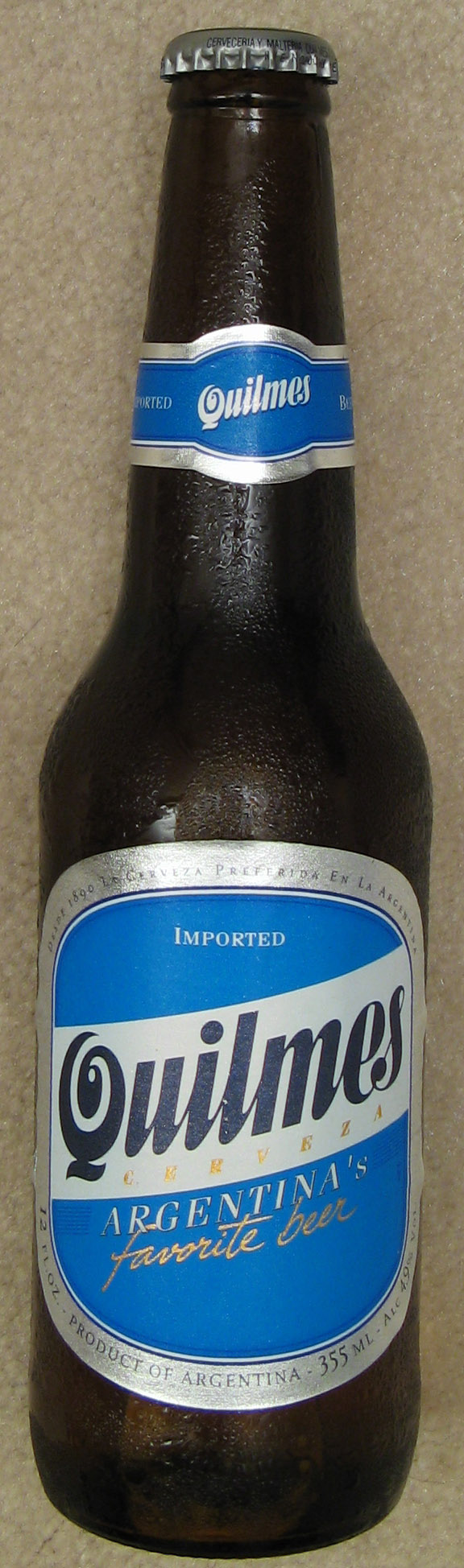
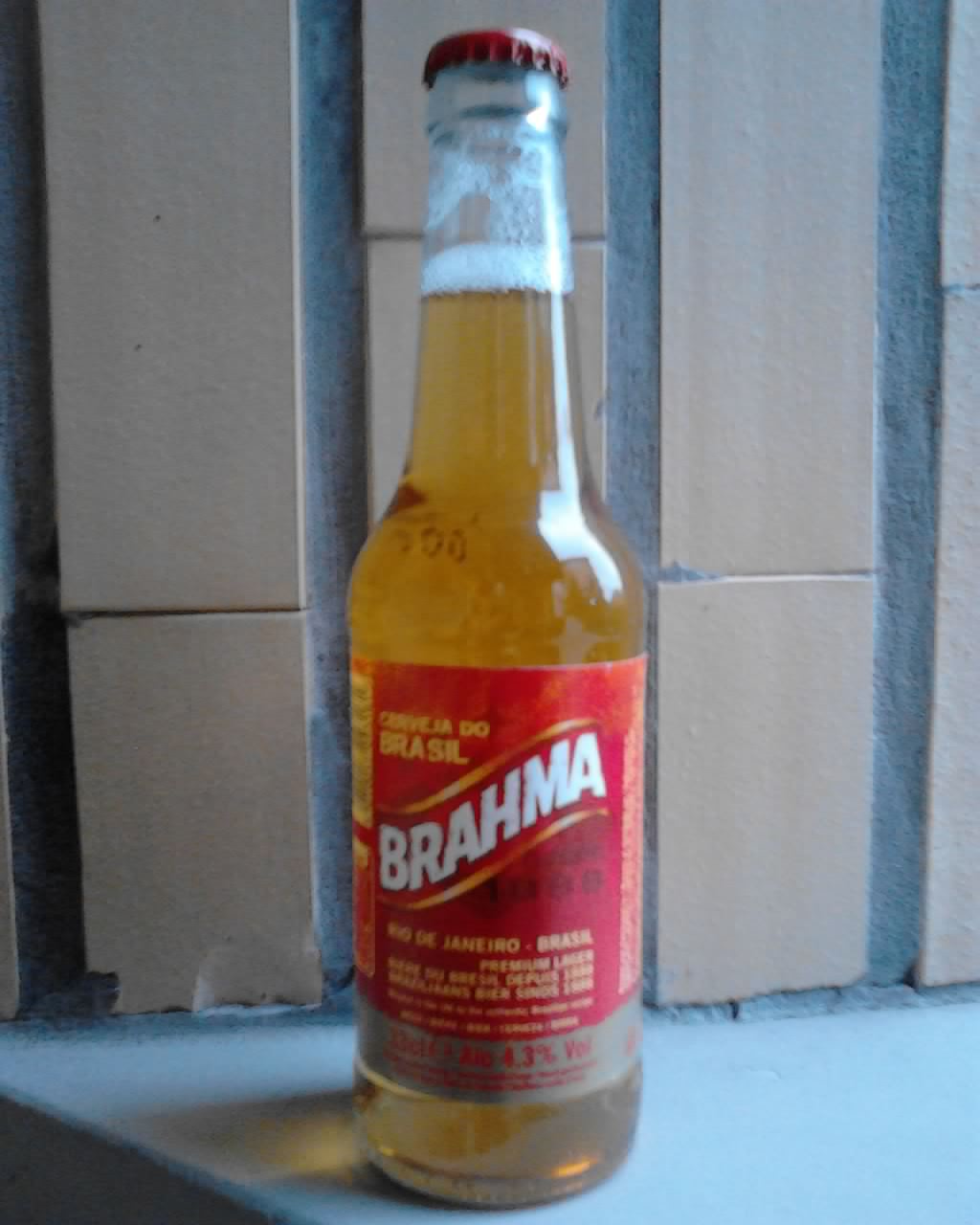
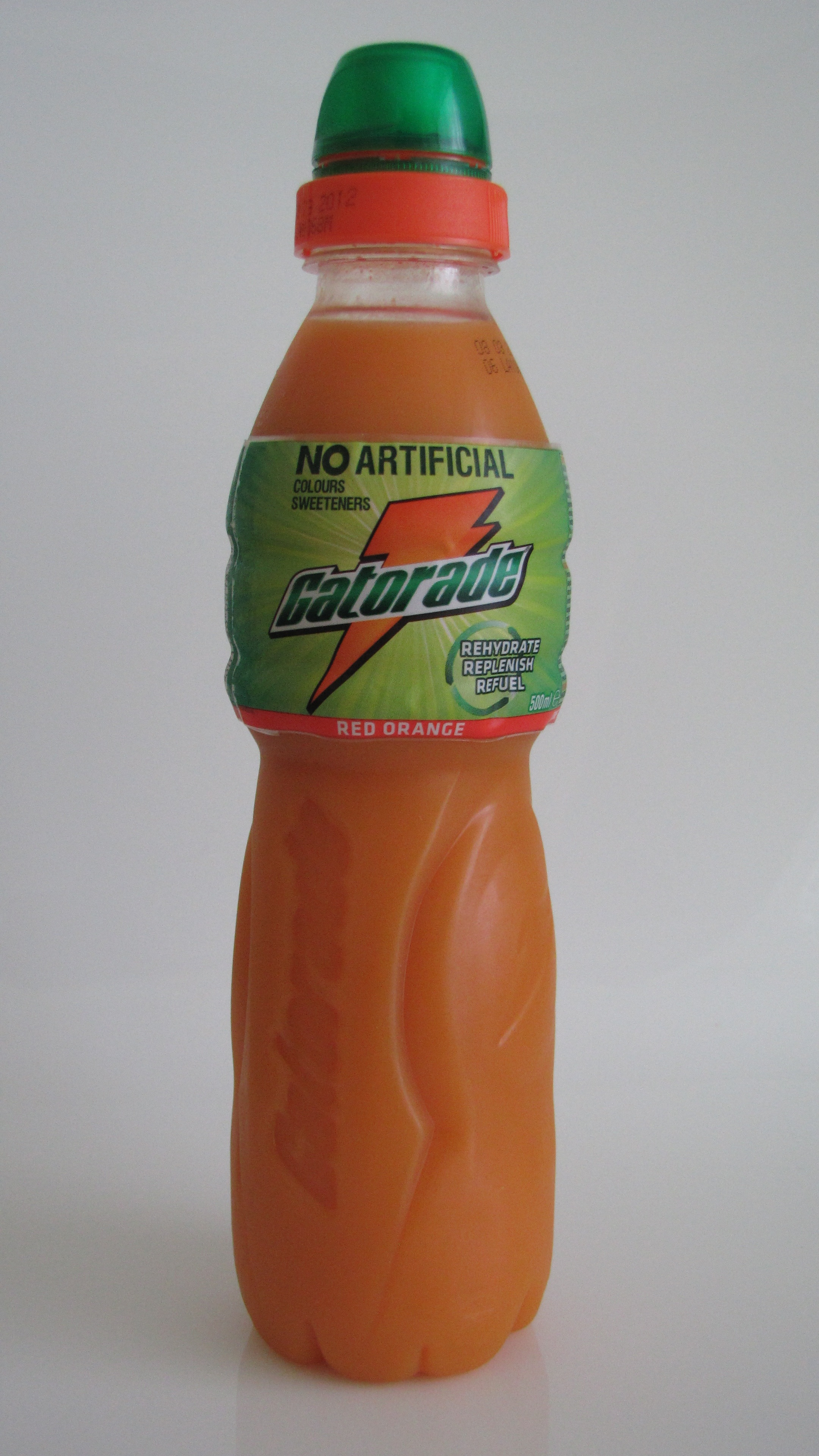
Some brands commercialised by the company, fltr: Quilmes beer, Brahma beer, Gatorade sports drink

Division	Brands
Beer	Quilmes, Patagonia, Brahma (Note: Under license of AB InBev.), Stella Artois, Andes, Corona, Budweiser
Mineral water	Eco de los Andes, Glaciar, Nestlé (Note: Under license of Nestlé.), Awafrut
Soft drink	Pepsi (Note: Under license of PepsiCo.), 7 Up Mirinda, Paso de los Toros, H2OH!, Guaraná
Sport drink	Gatorade
Energy drink	Red Bull (Note: Under license of Red Bull GmbH.)
Wine	Dante Robino
