= Marcelo Lascano =

Argentine historian and economist

Marcelo Lascano is an Argentine historian and economist. He is a teacher at the University of Buenos Aires, and lecturer at the universities of Kansas and Wisconsin–Oshkosh in the United States, University of Guadalajara in Mexico, universities of Madrid, Toledo and Palencia in Spain, and the Getúlio Vargas Foundation in Brazil. He headed the subsecretary of finances of Argentina, the bank of the Buenos Aires province, the EUDEBA publishing company and teams of scientific investigation at the CONICET. He published 20 books.

He used to support the governments of Néstor Kirchner and Cristina Fernández de Kirchner, and became critical of them during the 2008 Argentine government conflict with the agricultural sector.

== Bibliography ==
- Lascano, Marcelo (2005). Imposturas históricas e identidad nacional (in Spanish). Buenos Aires: El Ateneo. ISBN 950-02-5900-1.
