= Ireland at the UCI Track Cycling World Championships =

- IOC code: IRL

UCI Track Cycling World Championships appearances (overview)
- Recent: 2008; 2009; 2010; 2011; 2012; 2013; 2014; 2015; 2016; 2017; 2018; 2019; 2020; 2021; 2022; 2023; 2024; 2025

This page is an overview of Ireland at the UCI Track Cycling World Championships.

== 2016 ==
Ireland competed at the 2016 UCI Track Cycling World Championships at the Lee Valley VeloPark in London, United Kingdom from 2–4 March 2016. A team of 9 cyclists (7 women, 2 men) was announced to represent the country in the event.

=== Results ===
==== Men ====
Name	Event	Result	Rank
Eoin Mullen	Men's sprint		33
Felix English	Men's scratch	—	10
Felix English	Men's points race	-15 points	DNF

==== Women ====
Name	Event	Result	Rank
Melanie Späth	Women's individual pursuit	03:40.030	7
Shannon Mccurley	Women's keirin		21
Lydia Boylan	Women's scratch	—	20
Caroline Ryan	Women's points race	0 points	19
Caroline Ryan; Lydia Boylan; Josie Knight; Melanie Späth	Women's team pursuit	04:32.127	9

== 2015 ==
Ireland competed at the 2015 UCI Track Cycling World Championships in Saint-Quentin-en-Yvelines at the Vélodrome de Saint-Quentin-en-Yvelines from 18 to 22 February 2015. A team of 9 cyclists (5 women, 4 men) was announced to represent the country in the event.

=== Results ===
==== Men ====
Name	Event	Result	Rank
Eoin Mullen	Men's sprint	9.939 (Q),	22
Ryan Mullen	Men's individual pursuit	4:22.669	7
Martyn Irvine	Men's scratch	—	10
Martyn Irvine	Men's omnium	70 points	17

==== Women ====
Name	Event	Result	Rank
Caroline Ryan	Women's omnium	84 points	15
Caroline Ryan	Women's scratch	—	19
Caroline Ryan; Lydia Boylan; Lauren Creamer; Josie Knight	Women's team pursuit	4:40.388	16

== 2020 ==
=== Results ===
==== Men ====
Name	Event	Rank
Felix English	Men's Scratch	11
Mark Downey	Men's Points Race	18
Felix English Mark Downey	Men's Madison	11

==== Women ====
Name	Event	Rank
Lydia Boylan	Women's Omnium	9
Lydia Gurley	Women's Scratch	21
Lydia Gurley Lydia Boylan	Women's Madison	11
Kelly Murphy	Women's Individual Pursiut	15
Mia Griffin Kelly Murphy Alice Sharpe Lara Gillespie	Women's Team Pursiut	8

== 2021 ==
=== Results ===
==== Women ====
Name	Event	Rank
Mia Griffin Emily Kay Kelly Murphy Alice Sharpe	Women's Team Pursiut	5

== 2022 ==
=== Results ===
==== Women ====
Name	Event	Rank
Orla Walsh	Women's Sprint	26
Orla Walsh	Women's Time Trial	21
Kelly Murphy	Women's Individual Pursiut	7
Lara Gillespie	Women's Scratch	17
Alice Sharpe	Women's Elimination	11
Emily Kay	Women's Omnium	12
Mia Griffin Alice Sharpe	Women's Madison	13
Emily Kay Alice Sharpe Lara Gillespie Kelly Murphy	Women's Team Pursiut	9

== 2023 ==
=== Results ===
==== Women ====
Name	Event	Rank
Kelly Murphy	Women's Individual Pursiut	11
Emily Kay	Women's Scratch Race	12
Emily Kay	Women's Elimination Race	22
Lara Gillespie	Women's Omnium	9
Lara Gillespie Alice Sharpe	Women's Madison	12
Alice Sharpe Lara Gillespie Emily Kay Kelly Murphy	Women's Team Pursiut	9

== 2024 ==
=== Results ===
==== Women ====
Name	Event	Rank
Lara Gillespie	Women's Elimination	5
Lara Gillespie	Women's Omnium	8
Lara Gillespie	Women's Points Race	3rd place, bronze medalist(s)
Mia Griffin Lara Gilespie	Women's Madison	7
Lucy Bénézet Minns	Women's Individual Pursiut	16

== See also ==
- Australia at the UCI Track Cycling World Championships
- Cuba at the UCI Track Cycling World Championships
- Netherlands at the UCI Track Cycling World Championships
