= 2022 UCI Track Cycling World Championships – Women's scratch =

2022 UCI Track Cycling Competition

Women's scratch at the 2022 UCI Track Cycling World Championships
- Venue: Vélodrome National
- Location: Saint-Quentin-en-Yvelines, France
- Dates: 12 October
- Competitors: 24 from 24 nations

Medalists
gold medal	Martina Fidanza	Italy
silver medal	Maike van der Duin	Netherlands
bronze medal	Jessica Roberts	Great Britain

The Women's scratch was a competition at the 2022 UCI Track Cycling World Championships and was held on 12 October 2022.

== Results ==
The race was started at 20:00. First rider across the line without a net lap loss won.

Rank	Name	Nation	Laps down
1st place, gold medalist(s)	Martina Fidanza	Italy	
2nd place, silver medalist(s)	Maike van der Duin	Netherlands	
3rd place, bronze medalist(s)	Jessica Roberts	Great Britain	
4	Lily Williams	United States	
5	Michaela Drummond	New Zealand	
6	Chloe Moran	Australia	
7	Lea Lin Teutenberg	Germany	
8	Aline Seitz	Switzerland	
9	Maggie Coles-Lyster	Canada	
10	Petra Ševčíková	Czech Republic	
11	Yumi Kajihara	Japan	
12	Maria Martins	Portugal	
13	Katrijn De Clerq	Belgium	
14	Jade Labastugue	France	
15	Alžbeta Bačíková	Slovakia	
16	Ebtissam Zayed	Egypt	
17	Lara Gillespie	Ireland	
18	Anita Stenberg	Norway	
19	Argiro Milaki	Greece	
20	Nikola Wielowska	Poland	
21	Eukene Larrarte	Spain	
22	Amber Joseph	Barbados	
23	Olivija Baleišytė	Lithuania	
24	Rinata Sultanova	Kazakhstan	
