= 2023 UCI Track Cycling World Championships – Women's omnium =

Women's omnium at the 2023 UCI Track Cycling World Championships
- Venue: Sir Chris Hoy Velodrome
- Location: Glasgow, United Kingdom
- Dates: 9 August
- Competitors: 24 from 24 nations
- Winning points: 145

Medalists
gold medal	Jennifer Valente	United States
silver medal	Amalie Dideriksen	Denmark
bronze medal	Lotte Kopecky	Belgium

The Women's omnium competition at the 2023 UCI Track Cycling World Championships was held on 9 August 2023.

== Results ==
=== Scratch race ===
The scratch race was started at 17:38.

Rank	Name	Nation	Laps down	Event points
1	Ally Wollaston	New Zealand		40
2	Jennifer Valente	United States		38
3	Letizia Paternoster	Italy		36
4	Katie Archibald	Great Britain		34
5	Amalie Dideriksen	Denmark		32
6	Lotte Kopecky	Belgium		30
7	Maggie Coles-Lyster	Canada		28
8	Marit Raaijmakers	Netherlands		26
9	Yumi Kajihara	Japan		24
10	Maria Martins	Portugal		22
11	Valentine Fortin	France		20
12	Petra Ševčíková	Czech Republic		18
13	Olivija Baleišytė	Lithuania		16
14	Lara Gillespie	Ireland		14
15	Lee Sze Wing	Hong Kong		12
16	Argyro Milaki	Greece		10
17	Anita Stenberg	Norway		8
18	Ebtissam Mohamed	Egypt		6
19	Daria Pikulik	Poland		4
20	Chloe Moran	Australia		2
21	Amber Joseph	Barbados		1
22	Eukene Larrarte	Spain		1
23	Victoria Velasco	Mexico		1
24	Aline Seitz	Switzerland		1

=== Tempo race ===
The tempo race was started at 18:19.

Rank	Name	Nation	Lap points	Sprint points	Total points	Event points
1	Jennifer Valente	United States	20	10	30	40
2	Valentine Fortin	France	20	6	26	38
3	Ally Wollaston	New Zealand	20	3	23	36
4	Daria Pikulik	Poland	20	1	21	34
5	Yumi Kajihara	Japan	20	0	20	32
6	Eukene Larrarte	Spain	0	2	2	30
7	Lara Gillespie	Ireland	0	1	1	28
8	Amalie Dideriksen	Denmark	0	1	1	26
9	Anita Stenberg	Norway	0	1	0	24
10	Katie Archibald	Great Britain	0	1	1	22
11	Olivija Baleišytė	Lithuania	0	0	0	20
12	Letizia Paternoster	Italy	0	0	0	18
13	Maria Martins	Portugal	0	0	0	16
14	Marit Raaijmakers	Netherlands	0	0	0	14
15	Chloe Moran	Australia	0	0	0	12
16	Lee Sze Wing	Hong Kong	0	0	0	10
17	Lotte Kopecky	Belgium	0	0	0	8
18	Aline Seitz	Switzerland	0	0	0	6
19	Ebtissam Mohamed	Egypt	0	0	0	4
20	Maggie Coles-Lyster	Canada	0	0	0	2
21	Argyro Milaki	Greece	0	0	0	1
22	Amber Joseph	Barbados	0	0	0	1
23	Petra Ševčíková	Czech Republic	0	0	0	1
24	Victoria Velasco	Mexico	0	0	0	1

=== Elimination race ===
The elimination race was started at 18:58.

Rank	Name	Nation	Event points
1	Lotte Kopecky	Belgium	40
2	Jennifer Valente	United States	38
3	Valentine Fortin	France	36
4	Letizia Paternoster	Italy	34
5	Maria Martins	Portugal	32
6	Amalie Dideriksen	Denmark	30
7	Anita Stenberg	Norway	28
8	Marit Raaijmakers	Netherlands	26
9	Lara Gillespie	Ireland	24
10	Olivija Baleišytė	Lithuania	22
11	Ally Wollaston	New Zealand	20
12	Yumi Kajihara	Japan	18
13	Maggie Coles-Lyster	Canada	16
14	Katie Archibald	Great Britain	14
15	Eukene Larrarte	Spain	12
16	Lee Sze Wing	Hong Kong	10
17	Argyro Milaki	Greece	8
18	Petra Ševčíková	Czech Republic	6
19	Daria Pikulik	Poland	4
20	Ebtissam Mohamed	Egypt	2
21	Aline Seitz	Switzerland	1
22	Victoria Velasco	Mexico	1
23	Amber Joseph	Barbados	1
24	Chloe Moran	Australia	1

=== Points race and overall standings ===
The points race was started at 20:21.

Rank	Name	Nation	Lap points	Sprint points	Total points
1st place, gold medalist(s)	Jennifer Valente	United States	20	9	145
2nd place, silver medalist(s)	Amalie Dideriksen	Denmark	40	8	136
3rd place, bronze medalist(s)	Lotte Kopecky	Belgium	40	15	133
4	Katie Archibald	Great Britain	40	17	127
5	Valentine Fortin	France	20	3	117
6	Ally Wollaston	New Zealand	0	16	112
7	Daria Pikulik	Poland	20	16	78
8	Yumi Kajihara	Japan	0	0	74
9	Lara Gillespie	Ireland	0	4	70
10	Maria Martins	Portugal	0	0	70
11	Marit Raaijmakers	Netherlands	0	0	68
11	Letizia Paternoster	Italy	–20	0	68
13	Anita Stenberg	Norway	0	3	63
14	Olivija Baleišytė	Lithuania	0	0	58
15	Maggie Coles-Lyster	Canada	0	0	46
16	Eukene Larrarte	Spain	0	0	43
17	Lee Sze Wing	Hong Kong	0	2	34
18	Petra Ševčíková	Czech Republic	0	0	25
19	Argyro Milaki	Greece	0	2	21
20	Chloe Moran	Australia	0	1	16
21	Ebtissam Mohamed	Egypt	0	2	14
22	Aline Seitz	Switzerland	0	1	9
23	Amber Joseph	Barbados	0	0	3
24	Victoria Velasco	Mexico	0	0	3
