= 2023 UCI Track Cycling World Championships – Women's scratch =

Women's scratch at the 2023 UCI Track Cycling World Championships
- Venue: Sir Chris Hoy Velodrome
- Location: Glasgow, United Kingdom
- Dates: 4 August
- Competitors: 24 from 24 nations

Medalists
gold medal	Jennifer Valente	United States
silver medal	Maike van der Duin	Netherlands
bronze medal	Michaela Drummond	New Zealand

The Women's scratch competition at the 2023 UCI Track Cycling World Championships was held on 4 August 2023.

== Results ==
The race was scheduled to start at 19:58, but started later due to a delay. First rider across the line without a net lap loss won.

Rank	Name	Nation	Laps down
1st place, gold medalist(s)	Jennifer Valente	United States	
2nd place, silver medalist(s)	Maike van der Duin	Netherlands	
3rd place, bronze medalist(s)	Michaela Drummond	New Zealand	
4	Martina Fidanza	Italy	
5	Clara Copponi	France	
6	Tsuyaka Uchino	Japan	
7	Daria Pikulik	Poland	
8	Maggie Coles-Lyster	Canada	
9	Anita Stenberg	Norway	
10	Olivija Baleišytė	Lithuania	
11	Jessica Roberts	Great Britain	
12	Emily Kay	Ireland	
13	Chloe Moran	Australia	
14	Jasmin Liechti	Switzerland	
15	Petra Ševčíková	Czech Republic	
16	Lena Charlotte Reißner	Germany	
17	María Gaxiola	Mexico	
18	Katrijn De Clercq	Belgium	
19	Maria Martins	Portugal	
20	Lee Sze Wing	Hong Kong	
21	Amber Joseph	Barbados	
22	Eukene Larrarte	Spain	
23	Alžbeta Bačíková	Slovakia	
24	Ebtissam Zayed	Egypt	
