= 2021 UCI Track Cycling World Championships – Women's scratch =

Women's scratch at the 2021 UCI Track Cycling World Championships
- Venue: Vélodrome Couvert Régional Jean-Stablinski
- Location: Roubaix, France
- Dates: 20 October
- Competitors: 20 from 20 nations

Medalists
gold medal	Martina Fidanza	Italy
silver medal	Maike van der Duin	Netherlands
bronze medal	Jennifer Valente	United States

The Women's scratch competition at the 2021 UCI Track Cycling World Championships was held on 20 October 2021.

== Results ==
The race was started at 19:35. First rider across the line without a net lap loss won.

Rank	Name	Nation	Laps down
1st place, gold medalist(s)	Martina Fidanza	Italy	
2nd place, silver medalist(s)	Maike van der Duin	Netherlands	
3rd place, bronze medalist(s)	Jennifer Valente	United States	
4	Maggie Coles-Lyster	Canada	
5	Hanna Tserakh	Belarus	
6	Victoire Berteau	France	
7	Alžbeta Bačíková	Slovakia	
8	Daria Pikulik	Poland	
9	Petra Ševčíková	Czech Republic	
10	Neah Evans	Great Britain	
11	Tania Calvo	Spain	
12	Anita Stenberg	Norway	
13	Olivija Baleišytė	Lithuania	
14	Yumi Kajihara	Japan	
15	Tetyana Klimchenko	Ukraine	
16	Aline Seitz	Switzerland	
17	Verena Eberhardt	Austria	
18	Victoria Velasco	Mexico	
19	Amber Joseph	Barbados	
20	Johanna Kitti Borissza	Hungary	
–	Maria Martins	Portugal	Did not start
