= Cycling at the 2024 Summer Olympics – Women's omnium =

Women's Omnium at the Games of the XXXIII Olympiad
- Olympic track cycling
- Venues: Vélodrome National
- Date: 11 August 2024
- Competitors: 21 from 21 nations

Medalists
1st place, gold medalist(s)		Jennifer Valente	United States
2nd place, silver medalist(s)		Daria Pikulik	Poland
3rd place, bronze medalist(s)		Ally Wollaston	New Zealand

The women's omnium event at the 2024 Summer Olympics took place on 11 August 2024 at the Vélodrome National.

== Background ==
This was the fourth appearance of the event, which has been held at every Summer Olympics since its introduction in 2012.

== Competition format ==
An omnium is a multiple race event. The current Olympic format features four different types of race.

The entire event is contested within a single day, but there are breaks between the different races.

The winner of the omnium is the cyclist who obtains the most points across the four races. The winner of each of the first three races earns 40 points, the second-place cyclist earns 38, the third-place rider 36, and so forth, and the final race has special scoring rules. The races in the omnium are:

- Scratch race: Mass start race; first to cross the finish line is the winner. Distance is 7.5 km (30 laps).
- Tempo race: The new race for 2020, the distance is 7.5 km (30 laps). After the first five laps, the winner of each lap earns one point, and lapping the field earns 20 points. If a rider loses a lap, they lose 20 points. The winner of the tempo race is the cyclist with the most points (the points earned within the tempo race, i.e. for winning each lap and for lapping the field, do not count for the omnium total; they are used only to rank the cyclists' final placings for this race).
- Elimination race: Every two laps, the last-place cyclist is eliminated.
- Points race: A 20 km (80 lap) points race, with points earned for sprints (5/3/2/1, every 10 laps, with double points for the final sprint) and for lapping the field (20 points). If a rider loses a lap, they lose 20 points. The points earned within the points race (i.e. for winning each sprint and for lapping the field) count towards the omnium total.

There is only one round of competition.

== Schedule ==
All times are Central European Time (UTC+2)

Date	Time	Round
11 August 2024	11:00; 11:57; 12:53; 13:56	Scratch race Tempo race Elimination race Points race

== Results ==
=== Scratch race ===
Rank	Cyclist	Nation	Laps down	Event points
1	Jennifer Valente	United States		40
2	Maggie Coles-Lyster	Canada		38
3	Georgia Baker	Australia		36
4	Maike van der Duin	Netherlands		34
5	Ally Wollaston	New Zealand		32
6	Amalie Dideriksen	Denmark		30
7	Olivija Baleišytė	Lithuania		28
8	Anita Stenberg	Norway		26
9	Aline Seitz	Switzerland		24
10	Letizia Paternoster	Italy		22
11	Ebtissam Mohamed	Egypt		20
12	Liu Jiali	China		18
13	Maria Martins	Portugal		16
14	Daria Pikulik	Poland		14
15	Lara Gillespie	Ireland		12
16	Yumi Kajihara	Japan		10
17	Lotte Kopecky	Belgium		8
18	Franziska Brauße	Germany		6
19	Lee Sze Wing	Hong Kong		4
20	Victoria Velasco	Mexico		2
21	Valentine Fortin	France		1
22	Neah Evans	Great Britain		1

=== Tempo race ===
Rank	Cyclist	Nation	Laps down	Event points
1	Lara Gillespie	Ireland	24	40
2	Jennifer Valente	United States	9	38
3	Daria Pikulik	Poland	8	36
4	Georgia Baker	Australia	4	34
5	Franziska Brauße	Germany	1	32
6	Lotte Kopecky	Belgium	0	30
7	Amalie Dideriksen	Denmark	0	28
8	Maria Martins	Portugal	0	26
9	Ally Wollaston	New Zealand	0	24
10	Maggie Coles-Lyster	Canada	0	22
11	Aline Seitz	Switzerland	0	20
12	Anita Stenberg	Norway	0	18
13	Lee Sze Wing	Hong Kong	0	16
14	Olivija Baleišytė	Lithuania	0	14
15	Letizia Paternoster	Italy	0	12
16	Liu Jiali	China	0	10
17	Yumi Kajihara	Japan	0	8
18	Neah Evans	Great Britain	0	6
19	Valentine Fortin	France	0	4
20	Maike van der Duin	Netherlands	0	2
21	Ebtissam Mohamed	Egypt	−20	1
22	Victoria Velasco	Mexico	−40	−39

=== Elimination race ===
Rank	Cyclist	Nation	Laps down	Event points
1	Jennifer Valente	United States		40
2	Georgia Baker	Australia		38
3	Maggie Coles-Lyster	Canada		36
4	Lotte Kopecky	Belgium		34
5	Anita Stenberg	Norway		32
6	Letizia Paternoster	Italy		30
7	Maike van der Duin	Netherlands		28
8	Amalie Dideriksen	Denmark		26
9	Lara Gillespie	Ireland		24
10	Daria Pikulik	Poland		22
11	Valentine Fortin	France		20
12	Ally Wollaston	New Zealand		18
13	Olivija Baleišytė	Lithuania		16
14	Ebtissam Mohamed	Egypt		14
15	Maria Martins	Portugal		12
16	Liu Jiali	China		10
17	Neah Evans	Great Britain		8
18	Lee Sze Wing	Hong Kong		6
19	Aline Seitz	Switzerland		4
20	Victoria Velasco	Mexico		2
21	Yumi Kajihara	Japan		1
22	Franziska Brauße	Germany		1

=== Points race and final standings ===
Rank	Name	Nation	SR	TR	ER	Subtotal	Sprint points	Lap points	Finish order	Total points
1st place, gold medalist(s)	Jennifer Valente	United States	40	38	40	118	6	20	18	144
2nd place, silver medalist(s)	Daria Pikulik	Poland	14	36	22	72	19	40	4	131
3rd place, bronze medalist(s)	Ally Wollaston	New Zealand	32	24	18	74	11	40	2	125
4	Lotte Kopecky	Belgium	8	30	34	72	4	40	8	116
5	Georgia Baker	Australia	36	34	38	108	0	0	13	108
6	Maike van der Duin	Netherlands	34	2	28	64	2	40	9	106
7	Amalie Dideriksen	Denmark	30	28	26	84	1	20	22	105
8	Anita Stenberg	Norway	26	18	32	76	6	20	10	102
9	Maggie Coles-Lyster	Canada	38	22	36	96	5	0	11	101
10	Lara Gillespie	Ireland	12	40	24	76	3	20	6	99
11	Olivija Baleišytė	Lithuania	28	14	16	58	2	20	7	80
12	Aline Seitz	Switzerland	24	20	4	48	1	20	5	69
13	Letizia Paternoster	Italy	22	12	30	64	0	0	21	64
14	Maria Martins	Portugal	16	26	12	54	7	0	3	61
15	Neah Evans	Great Britain	1	6	8	15	17	20	1	52
16	Valentine Fortin	France	1	4	20	25	5	20	15	50
17	Yumi Kajihara	Japan	10	8	1	19	5	20	17	44
18	Franziska Brauße	Germany	6	32	1	39	2	0	14	41
19	Liu Jiali	China	18	10	10	38	0	0	20	38
20	Lee Sze Wing	Hong Kong	4	16	6	26	0	0	12	26
21	Ebtissam Mohamed	Egypt	20	1	14	35	0	–20	16	15
22	Victoria Velasco	Mexico	2	–39	2	–35	3	0	19	–32
