= UCI Track Cycling World Championships – Women's omnium =

The Women's omnium at the UCI Track Cycling World Championships was first contested in 2009 in Poland.

The format of the multi-race endurance event ("Omnium" coming from the Latin Omnia, for all) has evolved rapidly since its introduction in 2009. In its first iteration, the competition consisted of 5 events over a single day; a 'flying lap', a time trial over 200 metres with a rolling start, a scratch race, an individual pursuit time trial, a points race, and a 500 metre time trial. Riders were awarded points to match their placing in each event (1 for 1st, 2 for 2nd, etc) and the lowest cumulative score won the competition, with tie-breaks broken by cumulative times in the timed elements of the race.

In 2011, the competition was extended to six events: a 250m flying start time trial; a 5 km scratch race; an elimination race or 'Devil'; an individual pursuit; a 10 km points race; and a 500m time trial. Again, the placing a rider achieved in each event is converted to points, and the rider with the fewest points at the end of the competition won.

In 2015 the order and scoring of the events changed. The points race was moved to the finale event, and the five earlier events allowed riders to win points (with a maximum of 40 for 1st place) to carry into the final points race, whereupon points won in that race were simply added to the total, with the highest scoring rider (carried points included) at the end of that race declared the winner of the event.

In 2017 the first major change of events since 2011 took place, as the three timed elements were removed entirely, and a new fourth event the tempo race introduced. The format of carrying points over from the first three events into the final points race was maintained.

Six cyclists have won the title more than once, taking two gold medals each: Laura Trott and Katie Archibald, both of Great Britain, Tara Whitten of Canada, Sarah Hammer and Jennifer Valente of the United States, Kirsten Wild of the Netherlands in 2012 & 2016, 2017 & 2021, 2010 & 2011, 2013 & 2014, 2022 & 2023, and 2018 & 2019 respectively. Trott's three silver medals to Wild's one silver and two bronze medals makes Laura Trott, now Laura Kenny, marginally the most successful athlete overall in the history of the event. Along with Katie Archibald's 2017 and 2021 gold medals and Lizzie Armistead's silver, it also makes Great Britain the most successful nation in the event.

== Medalists ==
Championships	Winner	Runner-up	Third
First iteration - Five events Flying lap – Scratch – Individual Pursuit – Points – 500m t.t.
2009 Pruszków	Josephine Tomic (AUS)	Tara Whitten (CAN)	Yvonne Hijgenaar (NED)
2010 Ballerup	Tara Whitten (CAN)	Lizzie Armitstead (GBR)	Leire Olaberria (ESP)
Second iteration - six events Flying lap – Scratch – Elimination – Individual Pursuit – Points – 500m t.t.
2011 Apeldoorn	Tara Whitten (CAN)	Sarah Hammer (USA)	Kirsten Wild (NED)
2012 Melbourne	Laura Trott (GBR)	Annette Edmondson (AUS)	Sarah Hammer (USA)
2013 Minsk	Sarah Hammer (USA)	Laura Trott (GBR)	Annette Edmondson (AUS)
2014 Cali	Sarah Hammer (USA)	Laura Trott (GBR)	Annette Edmondson (AUS)
Third iteration - six events Scratch – Individual Pursuit – Elimination – 500m t.t.- Flying lap – Points
2015 Yvelines	Annette Edmondson (AUS)	Laura Trott (GBR)	Kirsten Wild (NED)
2016 London	Laura Trott (GBR)	Laurie Berthon (FRA)	Sarah Hammer (USA)
Fourth iteration - four events Scratch – Tempo – Elimination – Points
2017 Hong Kong	Katie Archibald (GBR)	Kirsten Wild (NED)	Amy Cure (AUS)
2018 Apeldoorn	Kirsten Wild (NED)	Amalie Dideriksen (DEN)	Rushlee Buchanan (NZL)
2019 Apeldoorn	Kirsten Wild (NED)	Letizia Paternoster (ITA)	Jennifer Valente (USA)
2020 Berlin	Yumi Kajihara (JPN)	Letizia Paternoster (ITA)	Daria Pikulik (POL)
2021 Roubaix	Katie Archibald (GBR)	Lotte Kopecky (BEL)	Elisa Balsamo (ITA)
2022 Saint-Quentin-en-Yvelines	Jennifer Valente (USA)	Maike van der Duin (NED)	Maria Martins (POR)
2023 Glasgow	Jennifer Valente (USA)	Amalie Dideriksen (DEN)	Lotte Kopecky (BEL)
2024 Ballerup	Ally Wollaston (NZL)	Jessica Roberts (GBR)	Anita Stenberg (NOR)
2025 Santiago	Lorena Wiebes (NED)	Marion Borras (FRA)	Amalie Dideriksen (DEN)
2026 Shanghai	Anna Morris (GBR)	Tsuyaka Uchino (JPN)	Amalie Dideriksen (DEN)

== Medal table ==
Rank	Nation	Gold	Silver	Bronze	Total
1	Great Britain	5	5	0	10
2	United States	4	1	3	8
3	Netherlands	3	2	3	8
4	Australia	2	1	3	6
5	Canada	2	1	0	3
6	Japan	1	1	0	2
7	New Zealand	1	0	1	2
8	Denmark	0	2	2	4
9	Italy	0	2	1	3
10	France	0	2	0	2
11	Belgium	0	1	1	2
12	Norway	0	0	1	1
12	Poland	0	0	1	1
12	Portugal	0	0	1	1
12	Spain	0	0	1	1
Totals (15 entries)		18	18	18	54
