= 2022 UCI Track Cycling World Championships – Women's omnium =

Women's omnium at the 2022 UCI Track Cycling World Championships
- Venue: Vélodrome National
- Location: Saint-Quentin-en-Yvelines, France
- Dates: 14 October
- Competitors: 24 from 24 nations
- Winning points: 118

Medalists
gold medal	Jennifer Valente	United States
silver medal	Maike van der Duin	Netherlands
bronze medal	Maria Martins	Portugal

The Women's omnium competition at the 2022 UCI Track Cycling World Championships was held on 14 October 2022.

== Results ==
=== Scratch race ===
The scratch race was started at 14:19.

Rank	Name	Nation	Laps down	Event points
1	Jennifer Valente	United States		40
2	Clara Copponi	France		38
3	Maggie Coles-Lyster	Canada		36
4	Michaela Drummond	New Zealand		34
5	Maike van der Duin	Netherlands		32
6	Anita Stenberg	Norway		30
7	Yumi Kajihara	Japan		28
8	Maria Martins	Portugal		26
9	Amber Joseph	Barbados		24
10	Petra Ševčíková	Czech Republic		22
11	Olivija Baleišytė	Lithuania		20
12	Elisa Balsamo	Italy		18
13	Lea Lin Teutenberg	Germany		16
14	Eukene Larrarte	Spain		14
15	Alžbeta Bačíková	Slovakia		12
16	Aline Seitz	Switzerland		10
17	Emily Kay	Ireland		8
18	Ebtissam Mohamed	Egypt		6
19	Lotte Kopecky	Belgium		4
20	Amalie Dideriksen	Denmark		2
21	Sophie Lewis	Great Britain		1
22	Karolina Karasiewicz	Poland		1
23	Victoria Velasco	Mexico		1
24	Verena Eberhardt	Austria		1

=== Tempo race ===
The tempo race was started at 16:50.

Rank	Name	Nation	Lap points	Sprint points	Total points	Event points
1	Maike van der Duin	Netherlands	20	3	23	40
2	Anita Stenberg	Norway	20	2	22	38
3	Maria Martins	Portugal	20	2	22	36
4	Emily Kay	Ireland	20	2	22	34
5	Amalie Dideriksen	Denmark	20	2	22	32
6	Jennifer Valente	United States	0	9	9	30
7	Michaela Drummond	New Zealand	0	4	4	28
8	Maggie Coles-Lyster	Canada	0	1	1	26
9	Clara Copponi	France	0	1	1	24
10	Lotte Kopecky	Belgium	0	0	0	22
11	Elisa Balsamo	Italy	0	0	0	20
12	Sophie Lewis	Great Britain	0	0	0	18
13	Verena Eberhardt	Austria	0	0	0	16
14	Lea Lin Teutenberg	Germany	0	0	0	14
15	Alžbeta Bačíková	Slovakia	0	0	0	12
16	Ebtissam Mohamed	Egypt	0	0	0	10
17	Eukene Larrarte	Spain	0	0	0	8
18	Petra Ševčíková	Czech Republic	0	0	0	6
19	Aline Seitz	Switzerland	0	0	0	4
20	Yumi Kajihara	Japan	0	0	0	2
21	Karolina Karasiewicz	Poland	0	0	0	1
22	Amber Joseph	Barbados	0	0	0	1
23	Victoria Velasco	Mexico	0	0	0	1
24	Olivija Baleišytė	Lithuania	−40	0	−40	1

=== Elimination race ===
The elimination race was started at 19:34.

Rank	Name	Nation	Event points
1	Jennifer Valente	United States	40
2	Elisa Balsamo	Italy	38
3	Lotte Kopecky	Belgium	36
4	Maria Martins	Portugal	34
5	Maggie Coles-Lyster	Canada	32
6	Maike van der Duin	Netherlands	30
7	Anita Stenberg	Norway	28
8	Lea Lin Teutenberg	Germany	26
9	Amalie Dideriksen	Denmark	24
10	Emily Kay	Ireland	22
11	Clara Copponi	France	20
12	Michaela Drummond	New Zealand	18
13	Petra Ševčíková	Czech Republic	16
14	Aline Seitz	Switzerland	14
15	Eukene Larrarte	Spain	12
16	Verena Eberhardt	Austria	10
17	Ebtissam Mohamed	Egypt	8
18	Sophie Lewis	Great Britain	6
19	Yumi Kajihara	Japan	4
20	Karolina Karasiewicz	Poland	2
21	Alžbeta Bačíková	Slovakia	1
22	Victoria Velasco	Mexico	1
23	Amber Joseph	Barbados	1
24	Olivija Baleišytė	Lithuania	1

=== Points race and overall standings ===
The points race was started at 21:01.

Rank	Name	Nation	Lap points	Sprint points	Total points
1st place, gold medalist(s)	Jennifer Valente	United States	0	8	118
2nd place, silver medalist(s)	Maike van der Duin	Netherlands	0	7	109
3rd place, bronze medalist(s)	Maria Martins	Portugal	0	3	99
4	Maggie Coles-Lyster	Canada	0	3	97
5	Anita Stenberg	Norway	0	0	96
6	Lotte Kopecky	Belgium	20	11	93
7	Michaela Drummond	New Zealand	0	9	89
8	Clara Copponi	France	0	5	87
9	Amalie Dideriksen	Denmark	20	5	83
10	Elisa Balsamo	Italy	0	4	80
11	Lea Lin Teutenberg	Germany	20	4	80
12	Emily Kay	Ireland	0	0	64
13	Yumi Kajihara	Japan	20	10	64
14	Aline Seitz	Switzerland	20	3	51
15	Petra Ševčíková	Czech Republic	0	0	44
16	Sophie Lewis	Great Britain	0	3	38
17	Eukene Larrarte	Spain	0	0	34
18	Verena Eberhardt	Austria	0	3	30
19	Alžbeta Bačíková	Slovakia	0	0	25
20	Ebtissam Mohamed	Egypt	0	0	24
21	Karolina Karasiewicz	Poland	0	10	14
22	Victoria Velasco	Mexico	0	1	4
23	Amber Joseph	Barbados	−40	0	−14
–	Olivija Baleišytė	Lithuania	Did not finish		
