= 2024 UCI Track Cycling World Championships – Women's omnium =

Sport competition

Women's omnium at the 2024 UCI Track Cycling World Championships
- Venue: Ballerup Super Arena
- Location: Ballerup, Denmark
- Dates: 18 October
- Competitors: 24 from 24 nations
- Winning points: 131

Medalists
gold medal	Ally Wollaston	New Zealand
silver medal	Jessica Roberts	Great Britain
bronze medal	Anita Stenberg	Norway

The Women's omnium competition at the 2024 UCI Track Cycling World Championships was held on 18 October 2024.

== Results ==
=== Scratch race ===
The scratch race was started at 14:30.

Rank	Name	Nation	Laps down	Event points
1	Yareli Acevedo	Mexico		40
2	Amalie Dideriksen	Denmark		38
3	Petra Ševčíková	Czech Republic		36
4	Anita Stenberg	Norway		34
5	Victoire Berteau	France		32
6	Lara Gillespie	Ireland		30
7	Jessica Roberts	Great Britain		28
8	Maria Martins	Portugal		26
9	Ally Wollaston	New Zealand		24
10	Aline Seitz	Switzerland		22
11	Letizia Paternoster	Italy		20
12	Zhou Menghan	China		18
13	Alžbeta Bačíková	Slovakia		16
14	Jennifer Valente	United States		14
15	Olga Wankiewicz	Poland		12
16	Lee Sze Wing	Hong Kong		10
17	Eva Anguela	Spain		8
18	Akvilė Gedraitytė	Lithuania		6
19	Tsuyaka Uchino	Japan		4
20	Lily Plante	Canada		2
21	Lina Hernández	Colombia		1
22	Alexandra Manly	Australia		1
23	Marith Vanhove	Belgium		1
24	Fanny Cauchois	Laos		1

=== Tempo race ===
The tempo race was started at 15:59.

Rank	Name	Nation	Lap points	Sprint points	Total points	Event points
1	Ally Wollaston	New Zealand	20	10	30	40
2	Tsuyaka Uchino	Japan	20	3	23	38
3	Jessica Roberts	Great Britain	20	1	21	36
4	Anita Stenberg	Norway	20	1	21	34
5	Victoire Berteau	France	20	0	20	32
6	Amalie Dideriksen	Denmark	0	4	4	30
7	Aline Seitz	Switzerland	0	3	3	28
8	Letizia Paternoster	Italy	0	2	2	26
9	Lara Gillespie	Ireland	0	1	1	24
10	Jennifer Valente	United States	0	1	1	22
11	Eva Anguela	Spain	0	0	0	20
12	Lily Plante	Canada	0	0	0	18
13	Maria Martins	Portugal	0	0	0	16
14	Petra Ševčíková	Czech Republic	0	0	0	14
15	Yareli Acevedo	Mexico	0	0	0	12
16	Olga Wankiewicz	Poland	0	0	0	10
17	Lee Sze Wing	Hong Kong	0	0	0	8
18	Alexandra Manly	Australia	0	0	0	6
19	Lina Hernández	Colombia	0	0	0	4
20	Zhou Menghan	China	0	0	0	2
21	Marith Vanhove	Belgium	0	0	0	1
22	Akvilė Gedraitytė	Lithuania	0	0	0	1
23	Alžbeta Bačíková	Slovakia	−20	0	0	1
24	Fanny Cauchois	Laos	−40	0	−40	−39

=== Elimination race ===
The elimination race was started at 19:34.

Rank	Name	Nation	Event points
1	Ally Wollaston	New Zealand	40
2	Jennifer Valente	United States	38
3	Anita Stenberg	Norway	36
4	Victoire Berteau	France	34
5	Amalie Dideriksen	Denmark	32
6	Maria Martins	Portugal	30
7	Jessica Roberts	Great Britain	28
8	Lara Gillespie	Ireland	26
9	Petra Ševčíková	Czech Republic	24
10	Eva Anguela	Spain	22
11	Yareli Acevedo	Mexico	20
12	Tsuyaka Uchino	Japan	18
13	Alexandra Manly	Australia	16
14	Akvilė Gedraitytė	Lithuania	14
15	Letizia Paternoster	Italy	12
16	Lee Sze Wing	Hong Kong	10
17	Zhou Menghan	China	8
18	Aline Seitz	Switzerland	6
19	Olga Wankiewicz	Poland	4
20	Alžbeta Bačíková	Slovakia	2
21	Lina Hernández	Colombia	1
22	Marith Vanhove	Belgium	1
23	Fanny Cauchois	Laos	1
24	Lily Plante	Canada	1

=== Points race and overall standings ===
The points race was started at 19:34.

Rank	Name	Nation	Lap points	Sprint points	Total points
1st place, gold medalist(s)	Ally Wollaston	New Zealand	0	27	131
2nd place, silver medalist(s)	Jessica Roberts	Great Britain	20	7	119
3rd place, bronze medalist(s)	Anita Stenberg	Norway	0	6	110
4	Victoire Berteau	France	0	9	107
5	Amalie Dideriksen	Denmark	0	0	100
6	Yareli Acevedo	Mexico	20	3	95
7	Tsuyaka Uchino	Japan	20	9	89
8	Lara Gillespie	Ireland	0	5	85
9	Jennifer Valente	United States	0	8	82
10	Petra Ševčíková	Czech Republic	0	0	74
11	Maria Martins	Portugal	0	0	72
12	Aline Seitz	Switzerland	0	3	59
13	Letizia Paternoster	Italy	0	0	58
14	Eva Anguela	Spain	0	0	50
15	Lee Sze Wing	Hong Kong	0	5	33
16	Alexandra Manly	Australia	0	6	29
17	Lily Plante	Canada	0	7	28
18	Olga Wankiewicz	Poland	0	1	27
19	Lina Hernández	Colombia	0	1	7
20	Akvilė Gedraitytė	Lithuania	−20	0	1
21	Zhou Menghan	China	−40	0	−12
22	Marith Vanhove	Belgium	−20	2	−15
23	Alžbeta Bačíková	Slovakia	−40	0	−21
24	Fanny Cauchois	Laos	−40	0	−77
