= 2024 UCI Track Cycling World Championships – Women's scratch =

Women's scratch at the 2024 UCI Track Cycling World Championships
- Venue: Ballerup Super Arena
- Location: Ballerup, Denmark
- Dates: 16 October
- Competitors: 24 from 24 nations

Medalists
gold medal	Lorena Wiebes	Netherlands
silver medal	Jennifer Valente	United States
bronze medal	Ally Wollaston	New Zealand

The Women's scratch competition at the 2024 UCI Track Cycling World Championships was held on 16 October 2024.

== Results ==
The race was started at 19:00. First rider across the line without a net lap loss won.

Rank	Name	Nation	Laps down
1st place, gold medalist(s)	Lorena Wiebes	Netherlands	
2nd place, silver medalist(s)	Jennifer Valente	United States	
3rd place, bronze medalist(s)	Ally Wollaston	New Zealand	
4	Martina Fidanza	Italy	
5	Anita Stenberg	Norway	
6	Lee Sze Wing	Hong Kong	
7	Sophie Lewis	Great Britain	
8	Olivija Baleišytė	Lithuania	
9	Ellen Klinge	Denmark	
10	Alžbeta Bačíková	Slovakia	
11	Maja Tracka	Poland	
12	Maho Kakita	Japan	
13	Marion Borras	France	
14	Lena Charlotte Reißner	Germany	
15	Petra Ševčíková	Czech Republic	
16	Maria Martins	Portugal	
17	Keira Will	Australia	
18	Lily Plante	Canada	
19	Cybèle Schneider	Switzerland	
20	Antonieta Gaxiola	Mexico	
21	Lani Wittevrongel	Belgium	
22	Marina Garau	Spain	−1
–	Anna Kolyzhuk	Ukraine	Did not finish
–	Fanny Cauchois	Laos	Did not finish
