= 2023 UCI Track Cycling World Championships – Women's team pursuit =

Women's team pursuit at the 2023 UCI Track Cycling World Championships
- Venue: Sir Chris Hoy Velodrome
- Location: Glasgow, United Kingdom
- Dates: 4–5 August
- Competitors: 66 from 15 nations
- Teams: 15
- Winning time: 4:08.771

Medalists
gold medal	Katie Archibald; Elinor Barker; Josie Knight; Anna Morris; Megan Barker	Great Britain
silver medal	Michaela Drummond; Ally Wollaston; Emily Shearman; Bryony Botha	New Zealand
bronze medal	Marion Borras; Valentine Fortin; Clara Copponi; Marie Le Net; Victoire Berteau	France

The Women's team pursuit competition at the 2023 UCI Track Cycling World Championships was held on 4 and 5 August 2023.

== Results ==
=== Qualifying ===
The qualifying was started on 4 August at 09:30. The eight fastest teams advanced to the first round.

Rank	Nation	Time	Behind	Notes
1	Great Britain; Katie Archibald; Elinor Barker; Josie Knight; Anna Morris	4:10.333		Q
2	New Zealand; Michaela Drummond; Ally Wollaston; Emily Shearman; Bryony Botha	4:11.777	+1.444	Q
3	United States; Jennifer Valente; Lily Williams; Olivia Cummins; Chloé Dygert	4:14.184	+3.851	Q
4	France; Marion Borras; Valentine Fortin; Victoire Berteau; Marie Le Net	4:14.463	+4.130	Q
5	Italy; Elisa Balsamo; Letizia Paternoster; Martina Fidanza; Vittoria Guazzini	4:14.742	+4.409	Q
6	Germany; Franziska Brauße; Lisa Klein; Mieke Kröger; Laura Süßemilch	4:15.035	+4.702	Q
7	Australia; Chloe Moran; Sophie Edwards; Georgia Baker; Maeve Plouffe	4:15.800	+5.467	Q
8	Canada; Maggie Coles-Lyster; Sarah Van Dam; Erin Attwell; Ariane Bonhomme	4:19.208	+8.875	Q
9	Ireland; Lara Gillespie; Emily Kay; Kelly Murphy; Alice Sharpe	4:21.653	+11.320	
10	Poland; Olga Wankiewicz; Karolina Karasiewicz; Karolina Kumięga; Wiktoria Pikulik	4:24.183	+13.850	
11	Japan; Yumi Kajihara; Maho Kakita; Tsuyaka Uchino; Mizuki Ikeda	4:25.332	+14.999	
12	China; Wang Susu; Wang Xiaoyue; Wei Suwan; Zhang Hongjie	4:25.547	+15.214	
13	Spain; Tania Calvo; Laura Rodríguez; Isabella Escalera; Isabel Ferreres	4:30.764	+20.431	
14	Mexico; Victoria Velasco; Yareli Acevedo; María Gaxiola; Lizbeth Salazar	4:31.770	+21.437	
15	Nigeria; Grace Ayuba; Tombrapa Grikpa; Mary Samuel; Ese Ukpeseraye	5:16.294	+1:05.961	

=== First round ===
The first round was started on 5 August at 12:31.

First round heats will be held as follows:
Heat 1: 6th v 7th fastest
Heat 2: 5th v 8th fastest
Heat 3: 2nd v 3rd fastest
Heat 4: 1st v 4th fastest

The winners of heats three and four advance to the gold medal race. The remaining six teams will be ranked on time, from which the top two proceed to the bronze medal race.

Heat	Rank	Nation	Time	Behind	Notes
1	1	Australia; Chloe Moran; Georgia Baker; Alexandra Manly; Maeve Plouffe	4:12.595		
1	2	Germany; Lena Charlotte Reißner; Franziska Brauße; Lisa Klein; Mieke Kröger	4:18.527	+5.932	
2	1	Italy; Elisa Balsamo; Letizia Paternoster; Martina Fidanza; Vittoria Guazzini	4:11.342		QB
2	2	Canada; Maggie Coles-Lyster; Sarah Van Dam; Ariane Bonhomme; Ruby West	4:26.507	+15.165	
3	1	New Zealand; Michaela Drummond; Ally Wollaston; Emily Shearman; Bryony Botha	4:10.252		QG
3	1	United States; Jennifer Valente; Lily Williams; Olivia Cummins; Chloé Dygert	4:12.684	+2.432	
4	1	Great Britain; Elinor Barker; Megan Barker; Josie Knight; Anna Morris	4:09.671		QG
4	2	France; Marion Borras; Valentine Fortin; Clara Copponi; Marie Le Net	4:12.525	+2.854	QB

- QG = qualified for gold medal final
- QB = qualified for bronze medal final

=== Finals ===
The finals were started on 5 August at 20:28.

Rank	Nation	Time	Behind	Notes
Gold medal race
1st place, gold medalist(s)	Great Britain; Katie Archibald; Elinor Barker; Josie Knight; Anna Morris	4:08.771		
2nd place, silver medalist(s)	New Zealand; Michaela Drummond; Ally Wollaston; Emily Shearman; Bryony Botha	4:13.313	+4.542	
Bronze medal race
3rd place, bronze medalist(s)	France; Marion Borras; Valentine Fortin; Clara Copponi; Marie Le Net	4:13.059		
4	Italy; Letizia Paternoster; Martina Fidanza; Chiara Consonni; Vittoria Guazzini	4:13.334	+0.275	
