= 2024 UCI Track Cycling World Championships – Women's elimination =

Women's elimination at the 2024 UCI Track Cycling World Championships
- Venue: Ballerup Super Arena
- Location: Ballerup, Denmark
- Dates: 17 October
- Competitors: 22 from 22 nations

Medalists
gold medal	Ally Wollaston	New Zealand
silver medal	Lotte Kopecky	Belgium
bronze medal	Jennifer Valente	United States

The Women's elimination competition at the 2024 UCI Track Cycling World Championships was held on 17 October 2024.

== Results ==
The race was started at 19:57.

Rank	Name	Nation
1st place, gold medalist(s)	Ally Wollaston	New Zealand
2nd place, silver medalist(s)	Lotte Kopecky	Belgium
3rd place, bronze medalist(s)	Jennifer Valente	United States
4	Letizia Paternoster	Italy
5	Lara Gillespie	Ireland
6	Maria Martins	Portugal
7	Maja Tracka	Poland
8	Yareli Acevedo	Mexico
9	Lea Lin Teutenberg	Germany
10	Gabriela Bártová	Czech Republic
11	Tsuyaka Uchino	Japan
12	Michelle Andres	Switzerland
13	Lee Sze Wing	Hong Kong
14	Eva Anguela	Spain
15	Sophie Lewis	Great Britain
16	Olivija Baleišytė	Lithuania
17	Keira Will	Australia
18	Ellen Klinge	Denmark
19	Anita Stenberg	Norway
20	Alžbeta Bačíková	Slovakia
21	Kiara Lylyk	Canada
22	Fanny Cauchois	Laos
