= Cycling at the 2024 Summer Olympics – Women's team pursuit =

Women's team pursuit at the Games of the XXXIII Olympiad
- Olympic track cycling
- Venues: Vélodrome National de Saint-Quentin-en-Yvelines
- Dates: 6–7 August 2024
- Competitors: 44 from 10 nations
- Teams: 10
- Winning time: 4:04.306

Medalists
1st place, gold medalist(s)		Chloé Dygert; Kristen Faulkner; Jennifer Valente; Lily Williams	United States
2nd place, silver medalist(s)		Bryony Botha; Emily Shearman; Nicole Shields; Ally Wollaston	New Zealand
3rd place, bronze medalist(s)		Elinor Barker; Josie Knight; Anna Morris; Jessica Roberts	Great Britain

The women's team pursuit event at the 2024 Summer Olympics took place from 6 to 7 August 2024 at the Vélodrome National de Saint-Quentin-en-Yvelines.

== Background ==
This was the 4th appearance of the event, which has been held at every Summer Olympics since its introduction in 2012.

== Competition format ==
A team pursuit race involves two teams of four cyclists. Each team starts at opposite sides of the track. There are two ways to win: finish 16 laps (4 km) before the other team does or catch the other team. The time for each team is determined by the third cyclist to cross the finish line; the fourth cyclist does not need to finish.

The tournament consists of three rounds:

- Qualifying round: Each team does a time trial for seeding. Only the top 4 teams are able to compete for the gold medal; the 5th place and lower teams can do no better than bronze.
- First round: Four heats of 2 teams each. The top 4 teams are seeded against each other (1 vs. 4, 2 vs. 3) while the bottom 4 teams are seeded against each other (5 vs. 8, 6 vs. 7). The winners of the top bracket advance to the gold medal final. The other 6 teams are ranked by time and advance to finals based on those rankings.
- Finals: Four finals, each with 2 teams. There is a gold medal final (gold and silver medals), a bronze medal final (bronze medal and 4th place), and 5th/6th and 7th/8th classification finals.

== Schedule ==
All times are Central European Time (UTC+2)

Date	Time	Round
6 August	17:30	Qualifying
7 August	13:52	First round
7 August	18:57	Finals

== Results ==
=== Qualifying ===
Rank	Nation	Time	Notes
1	New Zealand; Ally Wollaston; Bryony Botha; Emily Shearman; Nicole Shields	4:04.679	Q
2	United States; Jennifer Valente; Lily Williams; Chloé Dygert; Kristen Faulkner	4:05.238	Q
3	Great Britain; Elinor Barker; Josie Knight; Anna Morris; Jessica Roberts	4:06.710	Q
4	Italy; Letizia Paternoster; Chiara Consonni; Martina Fidanza; Vittoria Guazzini	4:07.579	Q
5	Germany; Franziska Brauße; Laura Süßemilch; Lisa Klein; Mieke Kröger	4:08.313	q
6	Australia; Georgia Baker; Sophie Edwards; Chloe Moran; Maeve Plouffe	4:08.612	q
7	France; Clara Copponi; Valentine Fortin; Marion Borras; Marie Le Net	4:08.797	q
8	Canada; Maggie Coles-Lyster; Sarah Van Dam; Erin Attwell; Ariane Bonhomme	4:12.205	
9	Ireland; Lara Gillespie; Mia Griffin; Kelly Murphy; Alice Sharpe	4:12.447	
10	Japan; Yumi Kajihara; Tsuyaka Uchino; Mizuki Ikeda; Maho Kakita	4:13.818	

=== First round ===
Heat	Rank	Nation	Time	Notes
1	1	France; Clara Copponi; Valentine Fortin; Victoire Berteau; Marion Borras	4:08.292	
1	2	Australia; Georgia Baker; Alexandra Manly; Sophie Edwards; Maeve Plouffe	4:09.975	
2	1	Germany; Franziska Brauße; Laura Süßemilch; Lisa Klein; Mieke Kröger	4:07.908	
2	2	Canada; Maggie Coles-Lyster; Sarah Van Dam; Erin Attwell; Ariane Bonhomme	4:10.471	
3	1	United States; Jennifer Valente; Lily Williams; Chloé Dygert; Kristen Faulkner	4:04.629	QG
3	2	Great Britain; Elinor Barker; Josie Knight; Anna Morris; Jessica Roberts	4:04.908	QB
4	1	New Zealand; Ally Wollaston; Bryony Botha; Emily Shearman; Nicole Shields	4:04.818	QG
4	2	Italy; Elisa Balsamo; Letizia Paternoster; Martina Fidanza; Vittoria Guazzini	4:07.491	QB

=== Finals ===
Rank	Nation	Time	Notes
Gold medal final
1st place, gold medalist(s)	United States; Jennifer Valente; Lily Williams; Chloé Dygert; Kristen Faulkner	4:04.306	
2nd place, silver medalist(s)	New Zealand; Ally Wollaston; Bryony Botha; Emily Shearman; Nicole Shields	4:04.927	
Bronze medal final
3rd place, bronze medalist(s)	Great Britain; Elinor Barker; Josie Knight; Anna Morris; Jessica Roberts	4:06.382	
4	Italy; Elisa Balsamo; Chiara Consonni; Martina Fidanza; Vittoria Guazzini	4:08.961	
Fifth place final
5	France; Clara Copponi; Valentine Fortin; Marion Borras; Marie Le Net	4:06.987	
6	Germany; Franziska Brauße; Lena Charlotte Reißner; Lisa Klein; Mieke Kröger	4:08.349	
Seventh place final
7	Australia; Alexandra Manly; Sophie Edwards; Chloe Moran; Maeve Plouffe	4:11.548	
8	Canada; Maggie Coles-Lyster; Sarah Van Dam; Erin Attwell; Ariane Bonhomme	4:12.097	

== Officiating error ==
During the qualifying round, the Canadian team did two extra laps because the bell that indicated the last lap was not rung on time.
