= Josie Nelson =

English cyclist (born 2002)

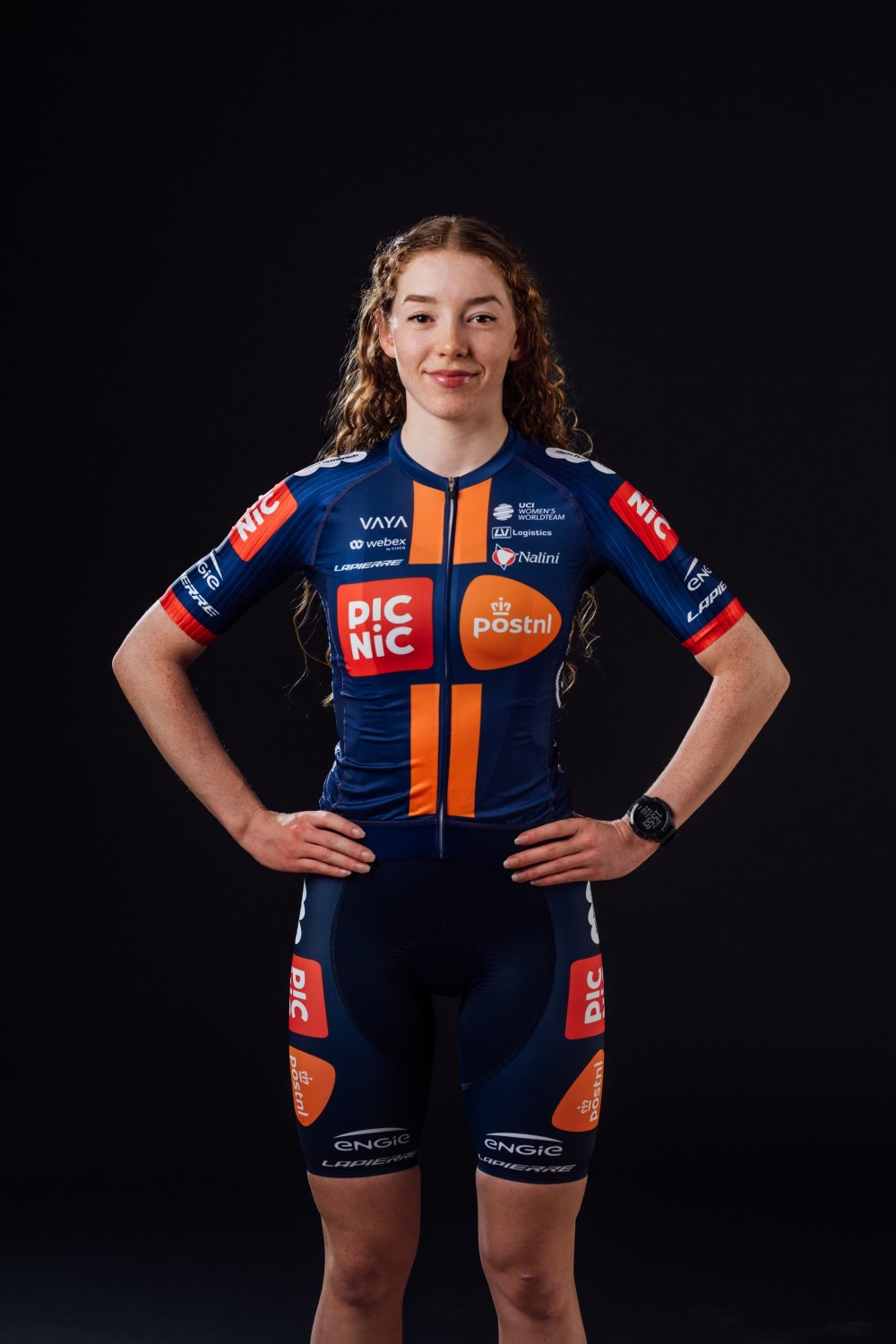

Personal information
- Full name: Josephine Nelson
- Born: 8 April 2002 (age 24) Lichfield, Staffordshire, England

Cycling career
- Sport: Cycling
- Current team: Team Picnic–PostNL
- Disciplines: Road; Cyclo-cross
- Role: Rider

Amateur team
- 2021: Isorex No-Aqua Ladies Cycling Team

Professional teams
- 2021–2023: Team Coop–Hitec Products
- 2024–: Team dsm–firmenich PostNL

Josie Nelson (born 8 April 2002) is a British international cyclist. She rides for the Dutch Women's World Tour Team Picnic PostNL and represented Team England at the 2022 Commonwealth Games in Birmingham.

== Biography ==
In 2021, Nelson won a silver medal at the British National Road Race Championships riding for Team Coop–Hitec Products. She also won the third round of the UK Cyclo-Cross National Trophy and competed in the Under-23 European Championships.

In 2022, she was selected for the 2022 Commonwealth Games in Birmingham. She competed in the women's road race.

== Personal life ==
Her sister, Emily Nelson, is a former World and European track cycling champion.

== Major results ==
=== Cyclo-cross ===
2018–2019
1st Overall Junior National Trophy Series
National Trophy Series

3rd Ipswich

2019–2020
1st Overall Junior National Trophy Series
2nd National Junior Championships
2021–2022
National Trophy Series

1st Falkirk
2nd Gravesend
2nd Broughton Park

1st Clanfield

=== Road ===
2021
2nd Road race, National Championships
2022
1st Circuit race, National Championships
7th Grand Prix International d'Isbergues
9th Overall Tour de la Semois
9th Leiedal Koerse
2023
4th Cadel Evans Great Ocean Road Race
2024
1st Time trial, National Under-23 Championships
2nd Overall Tour de Normandie

1st Stage 4

3rd Altez GP Oetingen p/b Lotto
2025
5th Time trial, National Championships
2026
2nd Cadel Evans Great Ocean Road Race
