= Cycling at the 2020 Summer Olympics – Women's omnium =

Olympic cycling event

Women's Omnium at the Games of the XXXII Olympiad
- Olympic track cycling
- Venues: Izu Velodrome
- Date: 8 August 2021
- Competitors: 21 from 21 nations
- Winning points: 124

Medalists
1st place, gold medalist(s)		Jennifer Valente	United States
2nd place, silver medalist(s)		Yumi Kajihara	Japan
3rd place, bronze medalist(s)		Kirsten Wild	Netherlands

The women's omnium event at the 2020 Summer Olympics took place on 8 August 2021 at the Izu Velodrome. 21 cyclists from 21 nations competed.

Jennifer Valente took the gold medal, edging reigning World champion Yumi Kajihara, who won silver. This was the first women's track cycling gold medal for the United States.

As the last final held during the 2020 Summer Olympics, the medals were presented by Yasuhiro Yamashita, IOC member, Olympian, 1 Gold Medal, Japan; and the medalists' bouquets were presented by David Lappartient, President of the UCI, France.

== Background ==
This will be the third appearance of the event, which was introduced in 2012.

The reigning Olympic champion was Laura Kenny of Great Britain, who has won both prior Olympic events. The reigning (2020) World Champion was Yumi Kajihara of Japan.

Russia, Germany, China, Great Britain, Australia, and the Netherlands are traditionally strong track cycling nations.

== Qualification ==
A National Olympic Committee (NOC) could enter up to 1 cyclist in the omnium. Quota places are allocated to the NOC, which selects the cyclists. Qualification is entirely through the 2018–20 UCI nation rankings. The best 8 NOCs in the madison rankings (not already qualified through the team pursuit) directly qualified to enter madison teams as well as earning 1 quota place in the omnium. There were another 13 places in the omnium available based on the omnium rankings; NOCs qualified through the madison were not eligible. Each continent was guaranteed at least one place in the omnium. Because qualification was complete by the end of the 2020 UCI Track Cycling World Championships on 1 March 2020 (the last event that contributed to the 2018–20 rankings), qualification was unaffected by the COVID-19 pandemic.

== Competition format ==
An omnium is a multiple-race event, and the current event features four different types of races.

The format has changed significantly from 2016, with three of the six race types dropped and one new type added, while the omnium also moved from a two-day format in prior Games to a one-day format in 2020.

The winner of the omnium is the cyclist who obtains the most points through the four races. The winner of each of the first three races earns 40 points, the second-place cyclist earns 38, the third-place rider 36, and so forth, and the final race has special scoring rules. The races in the omnium are:

- Scratch race: Mass start race; first to finish is the winner. Distance is 7.5 km (30 laps).
- Tempo race: The new race for 2020, the distance is 7.5 km (30 laps). After the first five laps, the winner of each lap earns one point, and lapping the field earns 20 points. The winner of the race is the cyclist with the most points (the points earned within the tempo race do not count for the omnium total: they are used only to place cyclists for this race).
- Elimination race: Every two laps, the last-place cyclist is eliminated.
- Points race: A 20 km (80 lap) points race, with points earned for sprints (5/3/2/1, every 10 laps, with double points for the final sprint) and for lapping the field (20 points).

There is only one round of competition.

== Schedule ==
All times are Japan Standard Time (UTC+9)

Date	Time	Round
8 August 2021	10:00; 10:45; 11:26; 12:25	Scratch race Tempo race Elimination race Points race

== Results ==
=== Scratch race ===
Rank	Cyclist	Nation	Laps down	Event points
1	Jennifer Valente	United States		40
2	Yumi Kajihara	Japan		38
3	Annette Edmondson	Australia		36
4	Anita Stenberg	Norway		34
5	Kirsten Wild	Netherlands		32
6	Maria Martins	Portugal		30
7	Allison Beveridge	Canada		28
8	Amalie Dideriksen	Denmark		26
9	Holly Edmondston	New Zealand		24
10	Liu Jiali	China		22
11	Tatsiana Sharakova	Belarus		20
12	Maria Novolodskaya	ROC		18
13	Lotte Kopecky	Belgium	DNF	16
13	Laura Kenny	Great Britain	DNF	16
13	Elisa Balsamo	Italy	DNF	16
13	Daria Pikulik	Poland	DNF	16
13	Clara Copponi	France	DNF	16
13	Olivija Baleišytė	Lithuania	DNF	16
13	Ebtissam Mohamed	Egypt	DNF	16
13	Emily Kay	Ireland	DNF	16
13	Pang Yao	Hong Kong	DNF	16

=== Tempo race ===
Rank	Name	Nation	Race points	Event points
1	Laura Kenny	Great Britain	7	40
2	Kirsten Wild	Netherlands	3	38
3	Jennifer Valente	United States	3	36
4	Anita Stenberg	Norway	1	34
5	Yumi Kajihara	Japan	1	32
6	Amalie Dideriksen	Denmark	1	30
7	Liu Jiali	China	0	28
8	Maria Martins	Portugal	0	26
9	Clara Copponi	France	–17	24
10	Elisa Balsamo	Italy	–18	22
11	Allison Beveridge	Canada	–18	20
12	Annette Edmondson	Australia	–18	18
13	Emily Kay	Ireland	–19	16
14	Holly Edmondston	New Zealand	–20	14
15	Tatsiana Sharakova	Belarus	–20	12
16	Maria Novolodskaya	ROC	–20	10
17	Olivija Baleišytė	Lithuania	–40	8
18	Ebtissam Mohamed	Egypt	–40	6
19	Pang Yao	Hong Kong	–40	4
	Lotte Kopecky	Belgium	DNF	0
	Daria Pikulik	Poland	DNF	0

=== Elimination race ===
Rank	Name	Nation	Event points
1	Clara Copponi	France	40
2	Yumi Kajihara	Japan	38
3	Amalie Dideriksen	Denmark	36
4	Jennifer Valente	United States	34
5	Maria Martins	Portugal	32
6	Olivija Baleišytė	Lithuania	30
7	Allison Beveridge	Canada	28
8	Anita Stenberg	Norway	26
9	Emily Kay	Ireland	24
10	Holly Edmondston	New Zealand	22
11	Kirsten Wild	Netherlands	20
12	Maria Novolodskaya	ROC	18
13	Laura Kenny	Great Britain	16
14	Liu Jiali	China	14
15	Elisa Balsamo	Italy	12
16	Pang Yao	Hong Kong	10
17	Ebtissam Mohamed	Egypt	8
18	Annette Edmondson	Australia	6
19	Tatsiana Sharakova	Belarus	4

=== Points race and final standings ===
Rank	Name	Nation	SR	TR	ER	Subtotal	Sprint points	Lap points	Finish order	Total points
1st place, gold medalist(s)	Jennifer Valente	United States	40	36	34	110	14	0	2	124
2nd place, silver medalist(s)	Yumi Kajihara	Japan	38	32	38	108	2	0	11	110
3rd place, bronze medalist(s)	Kirsten Wild	Netherlands	32	38	20	90	18	0	3	108
4	Amalie Dideriksen	Denmark	26	30	36	92	11	0	16	103
5	Anita Stenberg	Norway	34	34	26	94	3	0	4	97
6	Laura Kenny	Great Britain	16	40	16	72	24	0	1	96
7	Maria Martins	Portugal	30	26	32	88	7	0	5	95
8	Clara Copponi	France	16	24	40	80	5	0	7	85
9	Allison Beveridge	Canada	28	20	28	76	2	0	13	78
10	Holly Edmondston	New Zealand	24	14	22	60	7	0	8	67
11	Liu Jiali	China	22	28	14	64	1	0	9	65
12	Annette Edmondson	Australia	36	18	6	60	1	0	6	61
13	Emily Kay	Ireland	16	16	24	56	0	0	15	56
14	Elisa Balsamo	Italy	16	22	12	50	0	0	10	50
15	Maria Novolodskaya	ROC	18	10	18	46	4	0	12	50
16	Tatsiana Sharakova	Belarus	20	12	4	36	0	0	14	36
17	Olivija Baleišytė	Lithuania	16	8	30	54	0	–20	17	34
18	Ebtissam Mohamed	Egypt	16	6	8	30	0	–20	DNF	–
18	Pang Yao	Hong Kong	16	4	10	30	0	–40	DNF	–
	Lotte Kopecky	Belgium	16	DNF	Did not start				DNS	–
	Daria Pikulik	Poland	16	DNF	Did not start				DNS	–
