= 2025 Cadel Evans Great Ocean Road Race (women's race) =

2025 UCI Women's World Tour, race 2 of 27

Race details
- Dates: 1 February 2025
- Stages: 1
- Distance: 141.8 km (88.1 mi)
- Winning time: 3h 59' 43"

Results
	Winner	Ally Wollaston (NZL)	(FDJ–Suez)
	Second	Karlijn Swinkels (NED)	(UAE Team Emirates XRG)
	Third	Noemi Rüegg (SUI)	(EF Education–Oatly)

The 2025 Cadel Evans Great Ocean Road Race - Women was the 9th edition of Cadel Evans Great Ocean Road Race road cycling one day race, which was held on 1 February 2025 as part of the 2025 UCI Women's World Tour calendar. The race was won by New Zealand rider Ally Wollaston (FDJ–Suez) in a sprint finish from a small group.

== Teams ==
Ten UCI Women's WorldTeams, two UCI Women's ProTeams, one UCI Women's Continental Team and one national team made up the fourteen teams that took part in the race.

UCI Women's WorldTeams

- AG Insurance–Soudal
- Canyon//SRAM zondacrypto
- Ceratizit Pro Cycling
- FDJ–Suez
- Human Powered Health
- Lidl–Trek
- Liv AlUla Jayco
- Team Picnic–PostNL
- UAE Team ADQ
- Uno-X Mobility

UCI Women's ProTeams

- EF Education–Oatly
- St. Michel–Preference Home–Auber93

UCI Women's Continental Teams

- Team Coop–Repsol

National teams

- Australia

== Result ==
Result
Rank	Rider	Team	Time
1	Ally Wollaston (NZL)	FDJ–Suez	3h 59' 43"
2	Karlijn Swinkels (NED)	UAE Team ADQ	+ 0"
3	Noemi Rüegg (SUI)	EF Education–Oatly	+ 0"
4	Chloé Dygert (USA)	Canyon//SRAM zondacrypto	+ 0"
5	Silke Smulders (NED)	Liv AlUla Jayco	+ 0"
6	Ruth Edwards (USA)	Human Powered Health	+ 0"
7	Niamh Fisher-Black (NZL)	Lidl–Trek	+ 0"
8	Dilyxine Miermont (FRA)	Ceratizit Pro Cycling	+ 0"
9	Barbara Malcotti (ITA)	Human Powered Health	+ 0"
10	Mie Bjørndal Ottestad (NOR)	Uno-X Mobility	+ 2"
