= 2026 Cadel Evans Great Ocean Road Race (women's race) =

2026 UCI Women's World Tour, race 2 of 26

Race details
- Dates: 31 January 2026
- Stages: 1
- Distance: 141.2 km (87.7 mi)
- Winning time: 3h 54' 55"

Results
	Winner	Ally Wollaston (NZL)	(FDJ United–Suez)
	Second	Josie Nelson (GBR)	(Team Picnic–PostNL)
	Third	Mireia Benito (ESP)	(AG Insurance–Soudal)

The 2026 Cadel Evans Great Ocean Road Race - Women was the 10th edition of the Cadel Evans Great Ocean Road Race road cycling one day race, which was held on 31 January as part of the 2026 UCI Women's World Tour calendar. The race was won by New Zealand rider Ally Wollaston (FDJ–Suez) for the second year in a row in a sprint finish from a small group.

== Teams ==
Fourteen UCI Women's WorldTeams participated in the race.

UCI Women's WorldTeams

- AG Insurance–Soudal
- Canyon//SRAM Zondacrypto
- EF Education–Oatly
- FDJ United–Suez
- Fenix–Premier Tech
- Human Powered Health
- Lidl–Trek
- Liv AlUla Jayco
- Movistar Team
- Team Picnic–PostNL
- Team SD Worx–Protime
- UAE Team ADQ
- Uno-X Mobility
- Visma–Lease a Bike

== Result ==
Result
Rank	Rider	Team	Time
1	Ally Wollaston (NZL)	FDJ United–Suez	3h 54' 55"
2	Josie Nelson (GBR)	Team Picnic–PostNL	+ 0"
3	Mireia Benito (ESP)	AG Insurance–Soudal	+ 0"
4	Mackenzie Coupland (AUS)	Liv AlUla Jayco	+ 0"
5	Dominika Włodarczyk (POL)	UAE Team ADQ	+ 0"
6	Sarah Van Dam (CAN)	Visma–Lease a Bike	+ 0"
7	Noemi Rüegg (SUI)	EF Education–Oatly	+ 0"
8	Ella Wyllie (NZL)	Liv AlUla Jayco	+ 0"
9	Rosita Reijnhout (NED)	Visma–Lease a Bike	+ 0"
10	Amber Kraak (NED)	FDJ United–Suez	+ 0"
