= Ally Wollaston =

New Zealand track racing cyclist (born 2001)

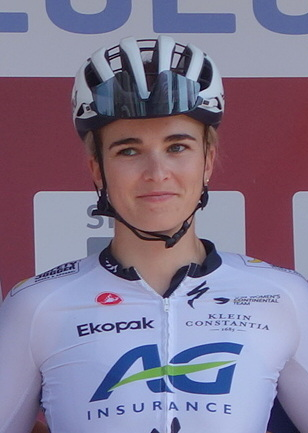
- Wollaston in 2023

Personal information
- Born: 4 January 2001 (age 25) Auckland, New Zealand
- Height: 170 cm (5 ft 7 in)

Cycling career
- Sport: Cycling
- Current team: FDJ United–Suez
- Disciplines: Road; Track
- Role: Rider

Amateur team
- 2020: Velo Project

Professional teams
- 2021–2024: NXTG Racing
- 2025–: FDJ–Suez

Major wins
- Road Stage races Tour of Britain (2025) One-day races and Classics National Road Race Championships (2023, 2026) Great Ocean Road Race (2025, 2026) Track World Championships Elimination (2024) Omnium (2024)
Medal record
Women's track cycling
Representing New Zealand
Olympic Games
Silver medal – second place	2024 Paris	Team pursuit
Bronze medal – third place	2024 Paris	Omnium
World Championships
Gold medal – first place	2024 Ballerup	Omnium
Gold medal – first place	2024 Ballerup	Elimination
Silver medal – second place	2023 Glasgow	Team pursuit
Bronze medal – third place	2024 Ballerup	Scratch
Commonwealth Games
Silver medal – second place	2026 Glasgow	Team pursuit
UCI Junior Track World Championships
Gold medal – first place	2019 Frankfurt	Individual pursuit
Silver medal – second place	2019 Frankfurt	Team pursuit
Silver medal – second place	2018 Aigle	Team pursuit

Ally Wollaston (born 4 January 2001) is a New Zealand professional track racing cyclist and road cyclist riding for FDJ United–Suez. She was a double-medallist at the 2024 Paris Olympics and is the first New Zealand rider to win two titles at the same track World Championships.

== Early life ==
Wollaston was born on 4 January 2001 in Auckland, New Zealand. She is the youngest of three sisters; her sister Nina has medalled at a Para-cycling road World Cup in 2019. She grew up in Auckland but later moved to the Waikato. She got into cycling through her family as they were helping out with the St Peter's School cycling team. Wollaston was educated at St Peter's School, and as of 2024 is a part-time law student at the University of Waikato.

== Career ==
Wollaston was part of the New Zealand team that won the team pursuit race in Hong Kong as part of the 2019–20 UCI Track Cycling World Cup. She also won gold in the individual pursuit at the 2019 UCI Junior Track Cycling World Championships.

Wollaston began racing professionally on the road for NXTG Racing in August 2021. In January 2022, Wollaston won the National criterium championships. She then went to join her team in Europe and got her first win for the team at the Grand Prix du Morbihan on 14 May 2022. Wollaston was selected to represent New Zealand at the 2022 Commonwealth Games. However, she crashed and injured her wrist during stage two of the 2022 Tour de France Femmes, and was unable to compete at the Commonwealth Games.

In 2023, Wollaston won her first national title, winning the New Zealand National Road Race Championships, as well as winning the Grand Prix Elsy Jacobs.

Wollaston started the 2024 season in good form and won a stage in the Tour Down Under in February. She developed knee problems, though, that required surgery at the end of March. After having missed the 2022 Commonwealth Games, this brought on fears of also missing the 2024 Summer Olympics in Paris, but the recovery went well. In June, she won two stages of the Volta a Catalunya in Spain. At the Paris Olympics, Wollaston won silver in the team pursuit (alongside Nicole Shields, Bryony Botha, and Emily Shearman), and a bronze medal in the omnium. At the 2024 UCI Track Cycling World Championships in Ballerup, Denmark, Wollaston become the first New Zealand rider to win two world championship titles at the same track world championships, taking gold medals in the elimination race and the omnium as well as bronze in the scratch race.

In 2025, Wollaston joined FDJ–Suez on a two year contract. In February 2025, Wollaston won her first UCI Women's World Tour one-day race at the Cadel Evans Great Ocean Road Race. In June 2025, Wollaston won Tour of Britain Women.

== Major results ==
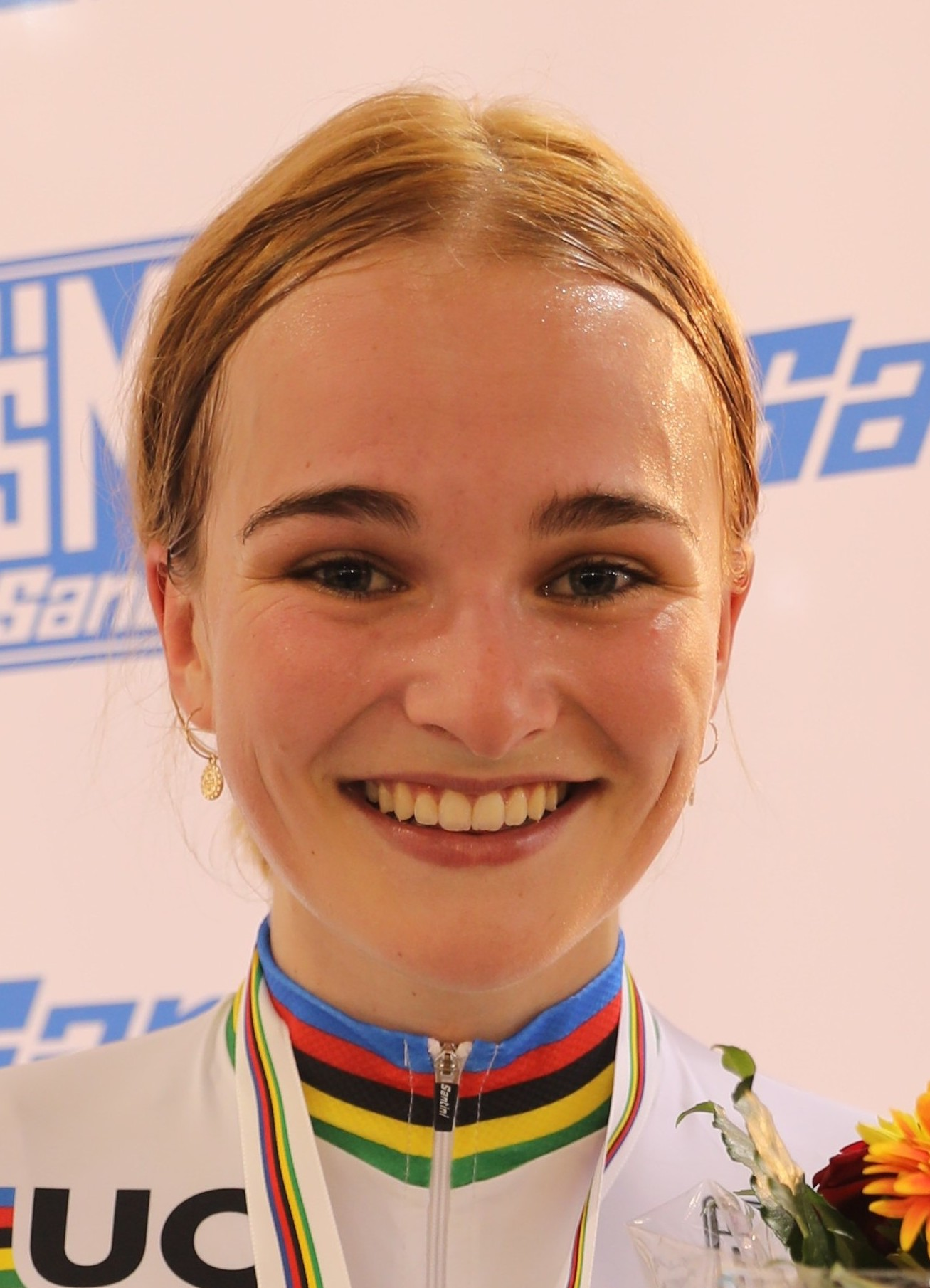
Wollaston in 2019

=== Road ===
2018
National Junior Championships

1st Road race
2nd Time trial

2019
National Junior Championships

1st Road race
4th Time trial

2020
National Under-23 Championships

3rd Road race
4th Time trial

2021
5th Overall Watersley Women's Challenge
2022 (2 pro wins)
1st Road race, National Under-23 Championships
1st Grand Prix du Morbihan
2nd Road race, National Championships
3rd Overall Belgium Tour

1st Points classification
1st Stage 1

3rd Overall Bretagne Ladies Tour
10th La Classique Morbihan
2023 (3)
National Championships

1st Criterium
1st Road race

1st Time trial, National Under-23 Championships
1st Overall Festival Elsy Jacobs

1st Points classification
1st Youth classification
1st Stage 2

1st Schwalbe Classic
2024 (3)
Volta a Catalunya

1st Points classification
1st Stages 1 & 3

1st Stage 1 Tour Down Under
2025 (5)
1st Overall Tour of Britain
1st Cadel Evans Great Ocean Road Race
1st Surf Coast Classic
1st Clásica de Almería
1st Stage 1 Tour Féminin International des Pyrénées
2026 (4)
National Championships

1st Road race
5th Time trial

1st Cadel Evans Great Ocean Road Race
Tour Down Under

1st Sprint classification
1st Stages 1 & 2

7th Milan–San Remo Women

=== Track ===
2018
2nd Team pursuit, UCI World Junior Championships
2019
UCI World Junior Championships

1st Individual pursuit
2nd Team pursuit

1st Team pursuit, UCI World Cup, Hong Kong
2023
2nd Team pursuit, UCI World Championships
2024
UCI World Championships

1st Elimination
1st Omnium
3rd Scratch

Olympic Games

2nd Team pursuit
3rd Omnium
