= Lily Williams (cyclist) =

American cyclist (born 1994)

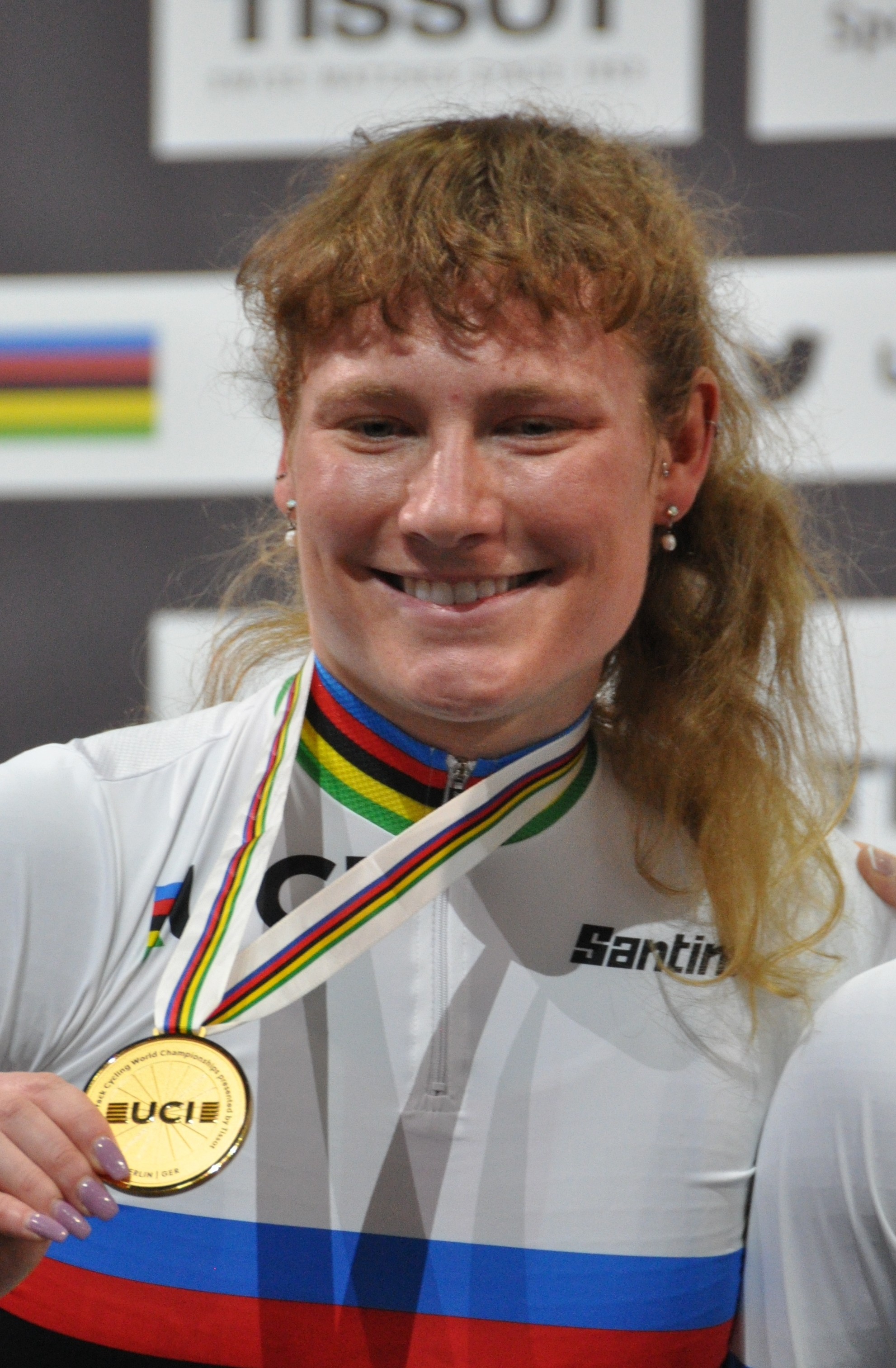
- Williams at the 2020 UCI Track Cycling World Championships

Personal information
- Born: June 24, 1994 (age 32) Tallahassee, Florida, U.S.
- Height: 5 ft 7 in (170 cm)
- Weight: 146 lb (66 kg)

Cycling career
- Sport: Cycling
- Current team: Human Powered Health
- Disciplines: Road; Track; Cyclo-cross
- Role: Rider

Professional teams
- 2018–2019: Hagens Berman–Supermint
- 2020–: Rally Cycling

Major wins
- Track Olympic Games Team pursuit (2024)
Medal record
Representing the United States
Women's track cycling
Olympic Games
Gold medal – first place	2024 Paris	Team pursuit
Bronze medal – third place	2020 Tokyo	Team pursuit
World Championships
Gold medal – first place	2020 Berlin	Team pursuit
Pan American Games
Gold medal – first place	2019 Lima	Team pursuit
Pan American Championships
Silver medal – second place	2019 Cochabamba	Team pursuit

Lily Williams (born June 24, 1994) is an American professional racing cyclist, who currently rides for UCI Women's Continental Team Human Powered Health.

Williams, the daughter of Olympic speed skater Sarah Docter Williams, grew up in Florida and ran cross country for Vanderbilt University. After graduating from Vanderbilt, she enrolled at Northwestern University's Medill School of Journalism in 2016 and took up an interest in competitive cycling.

In June 2021, she qualified to represent the United States at the 2020 Summer Olympics. She competed in the qualifying round of the women's team pursuit in track cycling. Team USA went on to earn a bronze medal in the final.

At the 2024 Paris Olympics, Williams won the gold medal in women's team pursuit in track cycling alongside Chloé Dygert, Kristen Faulkner, and Jennifer Valente. This was the first ever team track cycling gold medal in U.S. history.
