= Cadel Evans Great Ocean Road Race =

Cycling race in Australia

Race details
- Date: late January
- Region: Australia
- Discipline: Road
- Competition: UCI World Tour (2017–); UCI Women's World Tour (2020–)
- Type: One-day
- Organiser: O2 Events / Signature Sport
- Web site: www.cadelevansgreatoceanroadrace.com.au

History (men)
- First edition: 2015
- Editions: 10 (as of 2026)
- First winner: Gianni Meersman (BEL)
- Most wins: No repeat winners
- Most recent: Tobias Lund Andresen (DEN)

History (women)
- First edition: 2015
- Editions: 10 (as of 2026)
- First winner: Rachel Neylan (AUS)
- Most wins: Ally Wollaston (NZL) (2)
- Most recent: Ally Wollaston (NZL)

The Cadel Evans Great Ocean Road Race also known as Great Ocean Road Race or Cadel Road Race is an annual professional one-day road bicycle racing for both men and women starting and finishing in Geelong, Victoria, Australia, and routed along the picturesque Great Ocean Road.

The first races were held in 2015 as the farewell race for Cadel Evans – Australian cyclist who won the Tour de France in 2011 and the road world championships in 2009. Geelong had previously played host to the Australia World Cup in the UCI Women's Road World Cup between 2003 and 2008.

In 2017, the men's race joined the UCI World Tour calendar. In 2020, the women's race joined the UCI Women's World Tour calendar.

In November 2020, it was announced that the 2021 race would not be held due to the ongoing COVID-19 global pandemic. This was due in part to a number of UCI WorldTour teams making the decision to stay in Europe due to uncertainty around international travel conditions and logistics of quarantine requirements. The 2022 editions of the race were cancelled in December 2021 for similar reasons. The event returned in January 2023, featuring on both the men's and women's World Tour calendars.

== Course ==
The men's course is around 160 km (99 mi) to 180 km (110 mi) in length, while the women's course is around 140 km (87 mi). In 2023, the mass participation People's Ride includes three distance options—35 km, 50 km, or 125 km.

The race starts on the Geelong waterfront in Victoria, and travels westward to the rolling hills of Moriac, turning south toward the famous surf beach of Bells Beach, following the surf coast to Torquay and through Cadel’s hometown of Barwon Heads and Ocean Grove, before heading north back to a Geelong circuit before finishing back around on the waterfront. The course is suited to puncheurs.

== Results ==
=== Men's race ===
Year	Country	Rider	Team
2015	Belgium	Gianni Meersman	Etixx–Quick-Step
2016	Great Britain	Peter Kennaugh	Team Sky
2017	Germany	Nikias Arndt	Team Sunweb
2018	Australia	Jay McCarthy	Bora–Hansgrohe
2019	Italy	Elia Viviani	Deceuninck–Quick-Step
2020	Belgium	Dries Devenyns	Deceuninck–Quick-Step
2021	No race due to COVID-19 pandemic		
2022	No race due to COVID-19 pandemic		
2023	Germany	Marius Mayrhofer	Team DSM
2024	New Zealand	Laurence Pithie	Groupama–FDJ
2025	Switzerland	Mauro Schmid	Team Jayco–AlUla
2026	Denmark	Tobias Lund Andresen	Decathlon CMA CGM

==== Wins per country ====
Wins	Country
2	Belgium; Germany
1	Australia; Great Britain; Denmark; Italy; New Zealand; Switzerland

=== Women's race ===
New Zealand rider Ally Wollaston has won the most editions of the Cadel Evans Great Ocean Road Race, after wins in both 2025 and 2026.

Year	Country	Rider	Team
2015	Australia	Rachel Neylan	Building Champions Squad
2016	Australia	Amanda Spratt	Orica–AIS
2017	Netherlands	Annemiek van Vleuten	Orica–Scott
2018	Australia	Chloe Hosking	Alé–Cipollini
2019	Cuba	Arlenis Sierra	Astana
2020	Germany	Liane Lippert	Team Sunweb
2021	No race due to COVID-19 pandemic		
2022	No race due to COVID-19 pandemic		
2023	Netherlands	Loes Adegeest	FDJ–Suez
2024	Netherlands	Rosita Reijnhout	Visma–Lease a Bike
2025	New Zealand	Ally Wollaston	FDJ–Suez
2026	New Zealand	Ally Wollaston	FDJ United–Suez

==== Wins per country ====
Wins	Country
3	Australia; Netherlands
2	New Zealand
1	Cuba; Germany

== Melbourne pre-race criterium ==
In 2017 the pre-race criterium was known as the Race Melbourne - Albert Park, becoming the Towards Zero Race Melbourne in 2018. In 2019 the race was held in a team-based format with points awarded for sprints. Deceuninck-QuickStep won the men's event and Trek Segafredo won the women's event. In 2020 the race was not held and was replaced by Race Torquay.

=== Men's race ===
Year	Country	Rider	Team
2017	Ireland	Sam Bennett	Bora–Hansgrohe
2018	Ireland	Sam Bennett	Bora–Hansgrohe

=== Women's race ===
Year	Country	Rider	Team
2017	Netherlands	Kirsten Wild	Cylance Pro Cycling
2018	Australia	Annette Edmondson	Wiggle High5

== See also ==
- Surf Coast Classic, a precursor race held a few days before Cadel Evans Great Ocean Road Race
