= Maike van der Duin =

Dutch cyclist (born 2001)

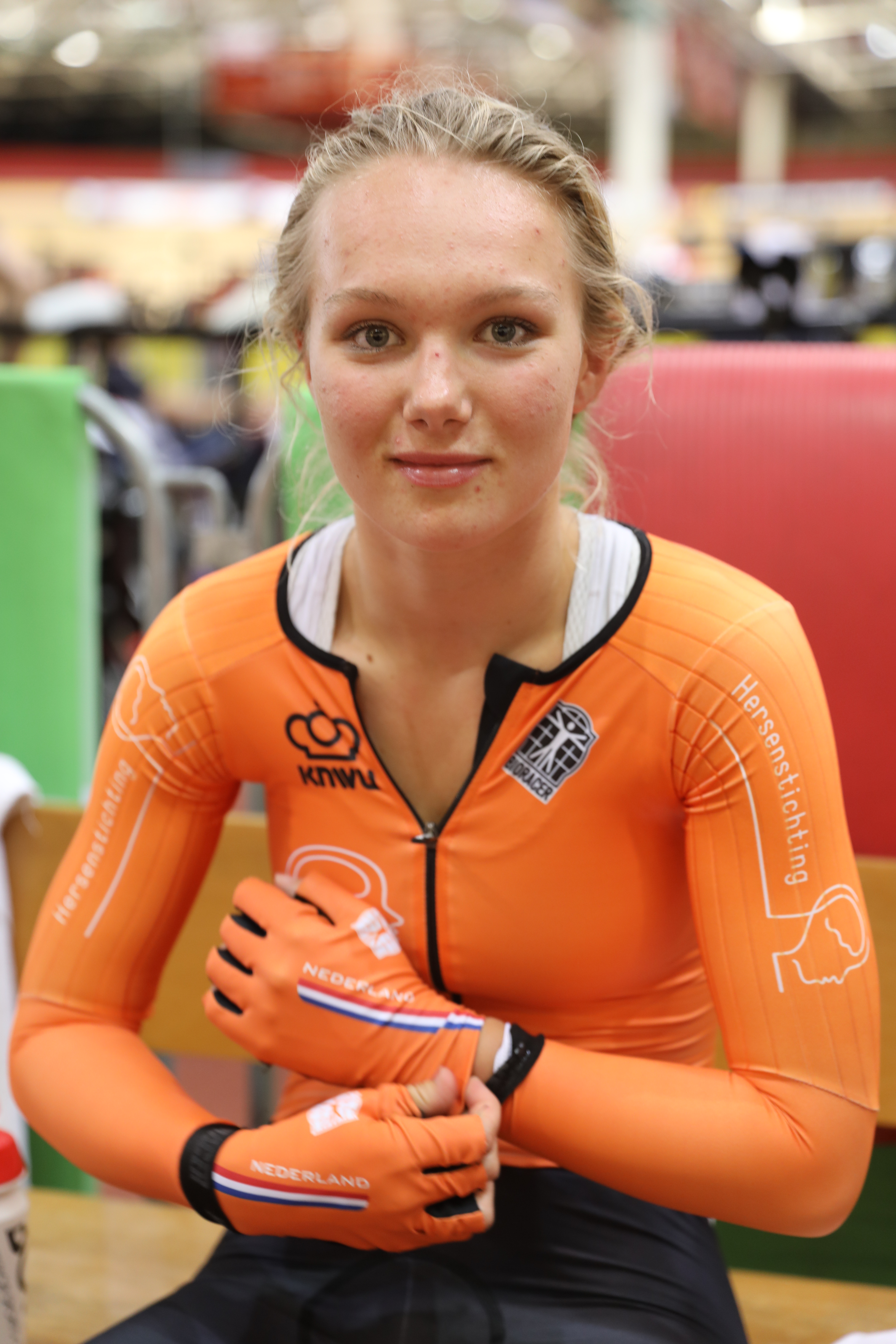
- Van der Duin in 2019

Personal information
- Full name: Maike van der Duin
- Born: 12 September 2001 (age 25)

Cycling career
- Sport: Cycling
- Current team: Canyon//SRAM
- Disciplines: Track; Road
- Role: Rider

Amateur team
- 2019: Swabo Women Development

Professional teams
- 2020: Biehler Krush Pro Cycling
- 2021–2022: Drops–Le Col
- 2023–: Canyon//SRAM
Medal record
Women's track cycling
Representing the Netherlands
Olympic Games
Bronze medal – third place	2024 Paris	Madison
World Championships
Silver medal – second place	2021 Roubaix	Scratch
Silver medal – second place	2022 Saint-Quentin-en-Yvelines	Scratch
Silver medal – second place	2022 Saint-Quentin-en-Yvelines	Omnium
Silver medal – second place	2023 Glasgow	Scratch
European Championships
Gold medal – first place	2025 Heusden-Zolder	Madison
Bronze medal – third place	2023 Grenchen	Elimination
Bronze medal – third place	2025 Heusden-Zolder	Points race

Maike van der Duin (born 12 September 2001) is a Dutch professional racing cyclist, who currently rides for UCI Women's WorldTeam Canyon//SRAM and represents the Netherlands on the track.

== Major results ==
2018
9th Overall Healthy Ageing Tour Juniors
2019
1st Stage 3 EPZ Omloop van Borsele
4th Road race, National Junior Road Championships
7th Overall Healthy Ageing Tour Juniors
2020
2nd Scratch, UEC European Under-23 Track Championships
2021
UEC European Under-23 Track Championships

1st Scratch
2nd Madison (with Marit Raaijmakers)
2nd Omnium
3rd Elimination race

1st Omloop der Kempen
7th Overall Kreiz Breizh Elites Dames
2022
5th Drentse Acht van Westerveld
Tour de France

Held after Stages 1–2
Stage 2

2023
3rd Gent–Wevelgem
3rd Ronde van Drenthe
3rd Omloop der Kempen
7th Classic Brugge–De Panne
8th Veenendaal–Veenendaal
2025
6th Omloop van het Hageland
