= Jessica Roberts =

British cyclist (born 1999)

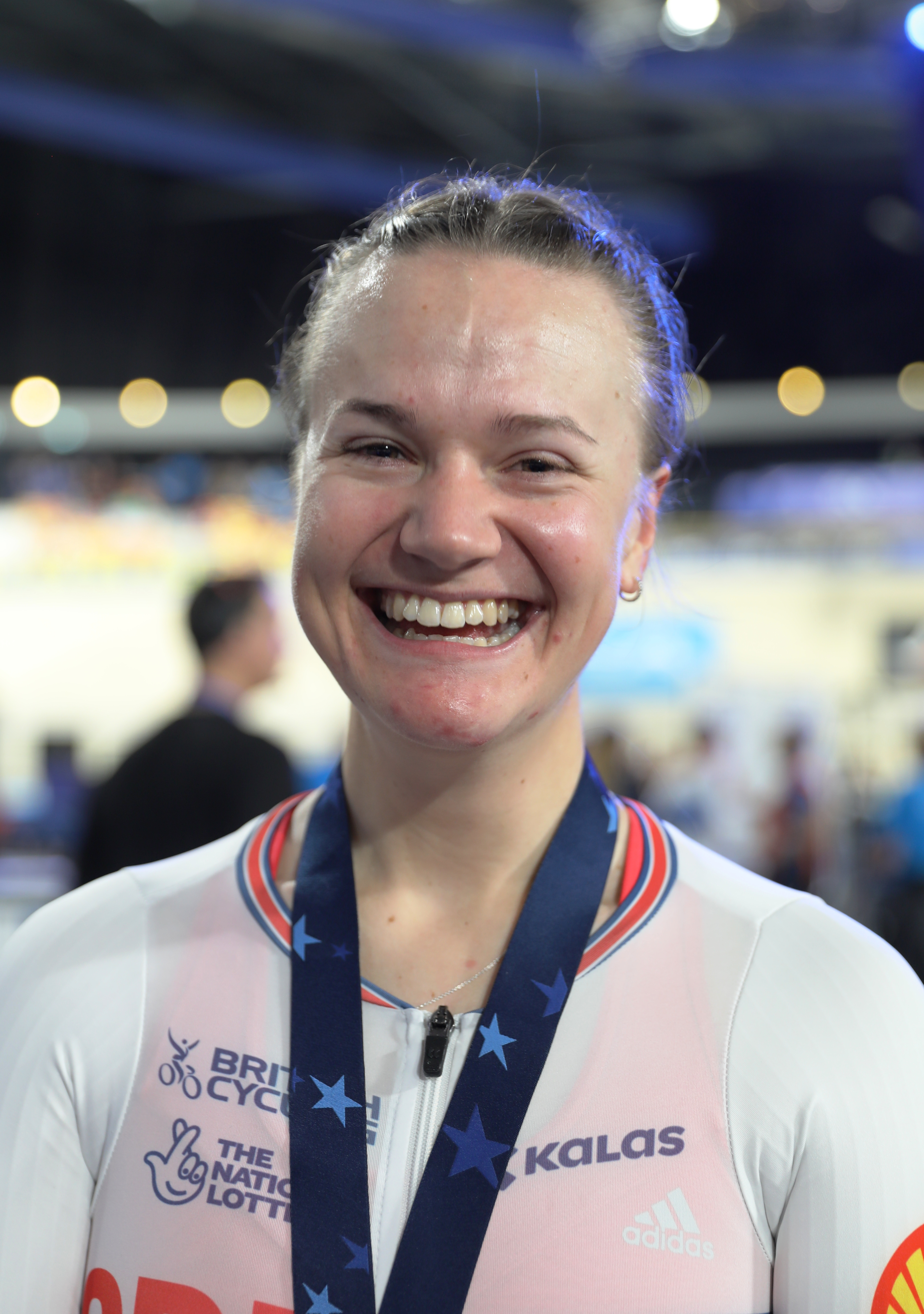
- Roberts in 2024

Personal information
- Full name: Jessica Anne Roberts
- Nickname: Jess
- Born: 11 April 1999 (age 27) Carmarthen, Wales, United Kingdom

Cycling career
- Sport: Cycling
- Current team: Spectra Racing
- Disciplines: Track; Road
- Role: Rider

Amateur teams
- 2018–2019: Team Breeze
- 2025: Spectra Racing

Professional teams
- 2020–2021: Mitchelton–Scott
- 2022-2023: Team Coop–Hitec Products

Major wins
- Road One-day races and Classics National Road Race Championships (2018) Track World Championships Team pursuit (2024)
Medal record
Women's track cycling
Representing Great Britain
Olympic Games
Bronze medal – third place	2024 Paris	Team pursuit
World Championships
Gold medal – first place	2024 Ballerup	Team pursuit
Silver medal – second place	2024 Ballerup	Omnium
Bronze medal – third place	2022 Saint-Quentin-en-Yvelines	Scratch
Bronze medal – third place	2025 Santiago	Team pursuit
European Games
Gold medal – first place	2019 Minsk	Madison
Silver medal – second place	2019 Minsk	Team pursuit
European Championships
Silver medal – second place	2022 Munich	Scratch
Silver medal – second place	2024 Apeldoorn	Team pursuit
Bronze medal – third place	2024 Apeldoorn	Elimination
Representing Wales
Commonwealth Games
Silver medal – second place	2026 Glasgow	Points race
Bronze medal – third place	2026 Glasgow	Team pursuit

Jessica Anne Roberts (born 11 April 1999) is a British cyclist, who currently rides for British club Spectra Racing.

She was part of the Great Britain squad which won gold in the team pursuit at the 2024 UCI Track Cycling World Championships in Ballerup, Denmark. Later at the event, she won silver in the omnium.

== Career ==
Roberts won the British National Road Race Championships in 2018. Her sister, Amy Roberts is also a professional cyclist.

Roberts won her third national title at the 2023 British Cycling National Track Championships, she won the Team Pursuit for the third time, after previously winning the title in 2017 and 2019.

She competed for Great Britain at the 2024 Summer Olympics.

In April 2026, Roberts won a silver medal in the team pursuit at the Track World Cup event in Hong Kong.

At the 2026 Commonwealth Games in Glasgow, Roberts, along with Anna Morris, Megan Barker and Ciara Oliva, won the bronze medal for Wales after defeating England in the team pursuit. In the points race, she claimed silver, after finishing behind compatriot Morris.

== Major results ==
=== Road ===
2016
2nd Road race, National Junior Championships
4th Time trial, UEC European Junior Championships
6th Overall Energiewacht Tour Juniors
2017
Healthy Ageing Tour Juniors

1st Prologue & Stage 3

4th Overall EPZ Omloop van Borsele
5th Piccolo Trofeo Alfredo Binda
2018 (1 pro win)
1st Road race, National Championships
6th Dwars door de Westhoek
2019 (2)
Tour Series

1st Redditch
1st Motherwell
1st Aberdeen

1st Wortegem–Petegem
5th Overall Tour de Bretagne

1st Stages 4 & 5

=== Track ===
2016
2nd Points race, UCI World Junior Championships
UEC European Junior Championships

3rd Omnium
3rd Team pursuit

2017
2nd Team pursuit, National Championships
2018
National Championships

1st Team pursuit
2nd Omnium
3rd Points race

UEC European Under-23 Championships

2nd Madison (with Megan Barker)
2nd Team pursuit

6th Dwars door de Westhoek
2019
European Games

1st Madison (with Megan Barker)
2nd Team pursuit

1st Omnium, UEC European Under-23 Championships
1st Team pursuit, National Championships
2022
2nd Scratch, UEC European Championships
3rd Scratch, UCI World Championships
2023
National Championships

1st Scratch
1st Team pursuit

2024
UCI World Championships

1st Team pursuit
2nd Omnium

UEC European Championships

2nd Team pursuit
3rd Elimination

3rd Team pursuit, Olympic Games
2025
3rd Team pursuit, UCI World Championships
2026
Track Cycling World Cup

2nd Team pursuit, Hong Kong

Commonwealth Games

2nd Points race
3rd Team pursuit
