= Jennifer Valente =

American cyclist (born 1994)

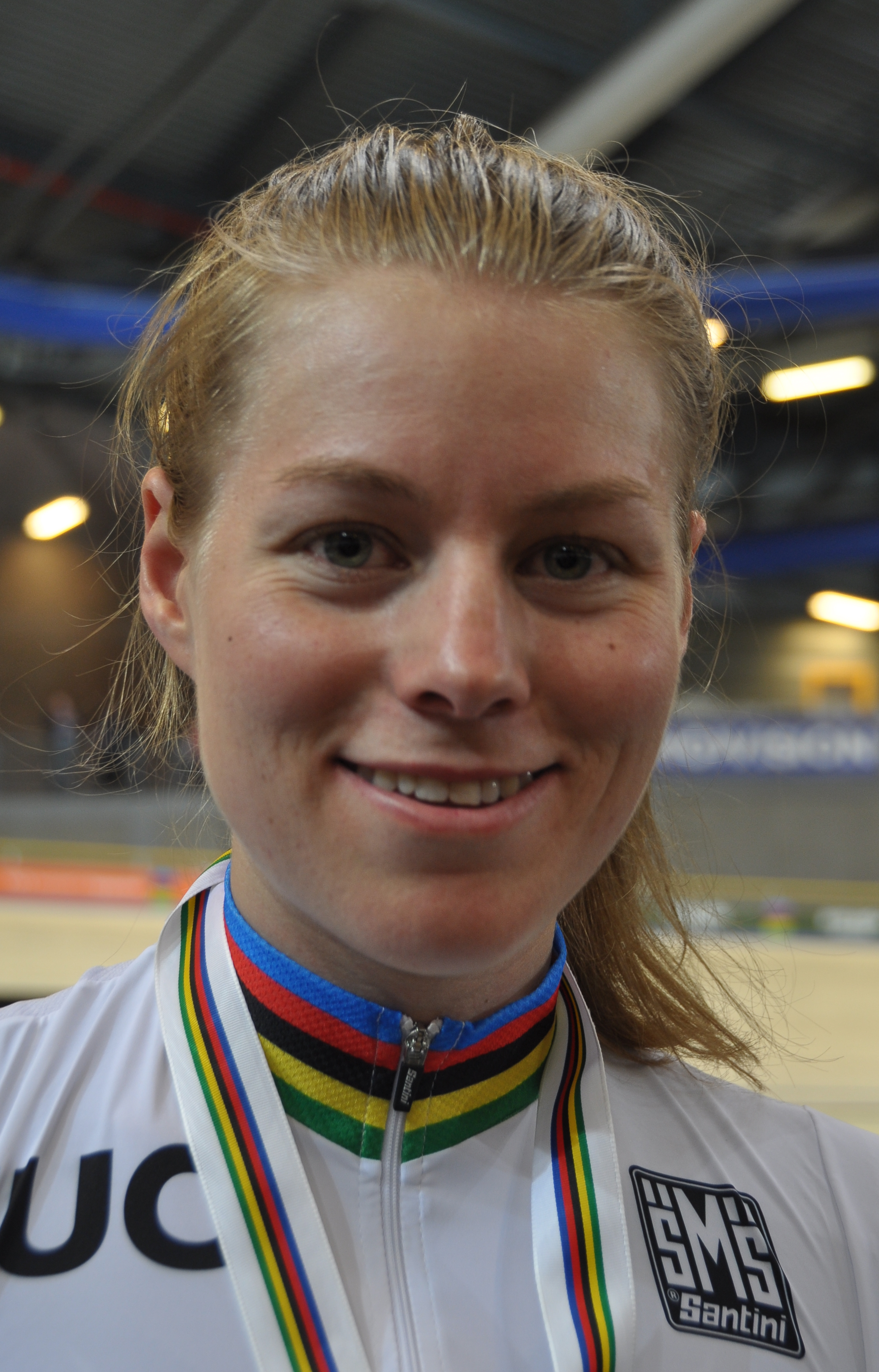
- Valente in 2018

Personal information
- Full name: Jennifer Marie Valente
- Born: December 24, 1994 (age 31) San Diego, California, U.S.
- Height: 5 ft 9 in (175 cm)
- Weight: 165 lb (75 kg)

Cycling career
- Sport: Cycling
- Current team: Virginia's Blue Ridge–Twenty28
- Disciplines: Track; Road
- Role: Rider
- Rider type: Pursuitist (track)

Amateur team
- 2014: Twenty16

Professional teams
- 2013: Exergy Twenty16
- 2015–: Twenty16 p/b Sho-Air

Major wins
- Track Olympic Games Omnium (2020, 2024) Team pursuit (2024)
Medal record
Event	1st	2nd	3rd
Olympic Games	3	1	1
World Championships	7	5	7
Pan American Games	1	1	0
Pan American Championships	20	1	4
Total	31	8	12
Women's track cycling
Representing the United States
Olympic Games
Gold medal – first place	2020 Tokyo	Omnium
Gold medal – first place	2024 Paris	Omnium
Gold medal – first place	2024 Paris	Team pursuit
Silver medal – second place	2016 Rio de Janeiro	Team pursuit
Bronze medal – third place	2020 Tokyo	Team pursuit
World Championships
Gold medal – first place	2016 London	Team pursuit
Gold medal – first place	2017 Hong Kong	Team pursuit
Gold medal – first place	2018 Apeldoorn	Team pursuit
Gold medal – first place	2020 Berlin	Team pursuit
Gold medal – first place	2022 Saint-Quentin-en-Yvelines	Omnium
Gold medal – first place	2023 Glasgow	Scratch
Gold medal – first place	2023 Glasgow	Omnium
Silver medal – second place	2015 Yvelines	Individual pursuit
Silver medal – second place	2018 Apeldoorn	Points race
Silver medal – second place	2020 Berlin	Scratch
Silver medal – second place	2020 Berlin	Points race
Silver medal – second place	2024 Ballerup	Scratch
Bronze medal – third place	2019 Pruszków	Omnium
Bronze medal – third place	2021 Roubaix	Scratch
Bronze medal – third place	2021 Roubaix	Elimination
Bronze medal – third place	2022 Saint-Quentin-en-Yvelines	Elimination
Bronze medal – third place	2022 Saint-Quentin-en-Yvelines	Points race
Bronze medal – third place	2023 Glasgow	Elimination
Bronze medal – third place	2024 Ballerup	Elimination
Pan American Games
Gold medal – first place	2019 Lima	Omnium
Silver medal – second place	2015 Toronto	Team pursuit
Pan American Championships
Gold medal – first place	2014 Aguascalientes	Team pursuit
Gold medal – first place	2015 Santiago	Scratch
Gold medal – first place	2015 Santiago	Individual pursuit
Gold medal – first place	2015 Santiago	Team pursuit
Gold medal – first place	2017 Couva	Omnium
Gold medal – first place	2017 Couva	Points race
Gold medal – first place	2017 Couva	Scratch
Gold medal – first place	2018 Aguascalientes	Omnium
Gold medal – first place	2018 Aguascalientes	Points race
Gold medal – first place	2018 Aguascalientes	Scratch
Gold medal – first place	2018 Aguascalientes	Team pursuit
Gold medal – first place	2019 Cochabamba	Omnium
Gold medal – first place	2019 Cochabamba	Scratch
Gold medal – first place	2019 Cochabamba	Points race
Gold medal – first place	2019 Cochabamba	Madison
Gold medal – first place	2024 Los Angeles	Omnium
Gold medal – first place	2024 Los Angeles	Scratch
Gold medal – first place	2024 Los Angeles	Points race
Gold medal – first place	2024 Los Angeles	Elimination
Gold medal – first place	2024 Los Angeles	Madison
Silver medal – second place	2019 Cochabamba	Team pursuit
Bronze medal – third place	2012 Mar del Plata	Keirin
Bronze medal – third place	2012 Mar del Plata	Scratch
Bronze medal – third place	2012 Mar del Plata	Team pursuit
Bronze medal – third place	2014 Aguascalientes	Omnium

Jennifer Marie Valente (born December 24, 1994) is an American professional racing cyclist who is a two-time gold medalist in women's omnium at the 2020 and 2024 Summer Olympics. As part of the U.S. team, she has also won the team pursuit at the Paris Olympics. Valente has ridden for UCI Women's Team Virginia's Blue Ridge–Twenty28. She has won seven gold medals in the World Championships and five Olympic medals, making her the most decorated U.S. female cyclist in Olympic history.

== Career ==
She enjoyed a successful junior career, winning 12 national titles and one world junior title. At the 2011 and 2012 UCI Junior Track World Championships she won three medals, a gold medal in the scratch race and two bronze medals in the keirin.

In the individual pursuit she won a silver medal at the 2015 UCI Track Cycling World Championships. In the team pursuit she has won three gold medals at the UCI Track Cycling World Championships and a silver medal at the 2016 Olympic Games.

In June 2021, she qualified to represent the United States at the 2020 Summer Olympics in Tokyo. She took the gold medal in the women's omnium, beating reigning World champion Yumi Kajihara of Japan. This was the first women's track cycling gold medal for the United States.

At the 2023 UCI Track Cycling World Championships, Valente became the most decorated American track cyclist in history, winning her 17th World Championship medal. She surpassed the previous recordholder, Sarah Hammer, who has fifteen.

In August 2024, she won her second and third Olympic gold medals, in the team pursuit and omnium. Valente's team pursuit gold medal was the first-ever in U.S. history. In both the 2020 and 2024 Olympics the women's omnium was one of the final events of the competition. As such, her gold medals helped the United States to come from behind and edge China in the overall medal count in Tokyo and Paris.

== Major results ==
2011
UCI Junior Track World Championships

1st Scratch
3rd Keirin

2012
1st Keirin, National Track Championships
3rd Keirin, UCI Junior Track World Championships
Pan American Track Championships

3rd Keirin
3rd Scratch
3rd Team pursuit

2013
2nd Team pursuit, Los Angeles Grand Prix (with Kimberly Geist, Sarah Hammer and Ruth Winder)
2014
Pan American Track Championships

1st Team pursuit (with Amber Gaffney, Kimberly Geist and Elizabeth Newell)
3rd Omnium

1st Omnium, National Track Championships
1st Omnium, Grand Prix of Colorado Spring
2015
2nd Individual pursuit, UCI Track World Championships
Pan American Track Championships

1st Individual pursuit
1st Scratch
1st Team pursuit (with Kelly Catlin, Sarah Hammer and Ruth Winder)

National Track Championships

1st Individual pursuit
1st Omnium
1st Scratch

2nd Team pursuit, Pan American Games (with Kelly Catlin, Sarah Hammer, Lauren Tamayo and Ruth Winder)
2014–15 UCI Track Cycling World Cup

3rd Team pursuit, Cali

2015–16 UCI Track Cycling World Cup

2nd Team pursuit, Cali
3rd Scratch, Cali

Independence Day Grand Prix

2nd Scratch
3rd Individual pursuit

2016
1st Team pursuit, UCI Track World Championships
2nd Team pursuit, Olympic Games
3rd Team pursuit, UCI Track Cycling World Cup (Hong Kong)
2017
1st Team pursuit, UCI Track World Championships
Pan American Track Championships

1st Omnium
1st Points race
1st Scratch

National Track Championships

1st Omnium
1st Points race
1st Scratch

1st Omnium, US Sprint GP
1st Omnium, Fastest Man on Wheels
2016–17 UCI Track Cycling World Cup

1st Team pursuit, Los Angeles

2017–18 UCI Track Cycling World Cup

1st Omnium, Manchester
2nd Omnium, Pruszków

5th Overall Cascade Cycling Classic
2018
UCI Track World Championships

1st Team pursuit
2nd Points race

Pan American Track Championships

1st Omnium
1st Points race
1st Scratch
1st Team pursuit

National Track Championships

1st Madison
1st Omnium
1st Points race
1st Scratch

2017–18 UCI Track Cycling World Cup

1st Team pursuit, Minsk
3rd Omnium, Minsk

2018–19 UCI Track Cycling World Cup

3rd Omnium, Milton
3rd Scratch Race, Milton
3rd Omnium, Berlin
2nd Omnium, London
2nd Team pursuit, London

10th Winston-Salem Cycling Classic
2019
3rd Omnium, UCI Track World Championships
National Track Championships

1st Madison
1st Omnium
1st Points race
1st Scratch

1st Omnium, 2019 Pan American Games
Pan American Track Cycling Championships

1st Omnium
1st Points race
1st Scratch
1st Madison
2nd Team pursuit

2019–20 UCI Track Cycling World Cup

1st Omnium, Minsk
1st Team pursuit, Minsk
1st Points Race, Minsk
3rd Scratch, Minsk
2nd Omnium, Cambridge
1st Omnium, Brisbane

2020
2020 UCI Track Cycling World Championships

1st Team pursuit
2nd Points race
2nd Scratch

2019–20 UCI Track Cycling World Cup

1st Omnium, Milton
1st Team pursuit, Milton
3rd Madison, Milton

2021
2020 Summer Olympics

1st Omnium
3rd Team pursuit

2021 UCI Track Cycling World Championships

3rd Scratch
3rd Elimination

2022
2022 UCI Track Cycling World Championships

1st Omnium
3rd Elimination
3rd Points race

2022 UCI Track Cycling Nations Cup

1st Elimination, Milton
2nd Omnium, Milton
3rd Team pursuit, Milton
1st Omnium, Cali
1st Elimination, Cali
1st Madison, Cali

2022 UCI Track Champions League

1st 2022 UCI Track Champions League – Endurance Overall

2023
2023 UCI Track Cycling World Championships

1st Omnium
1st Scratch
3rd Elimination

2023 UCI Track Cycling Nations Cup

1st Elimination, Cairo
2nd Elimination, Milton
3rd Omnium, Milton

2024
2024 Summer Olympics

1st Omnium
1st Team pursuit

2024 Pan American Track Cycling Championships

1st Omnium
1st Points race
1st Scratch
1st Elimination
1st Madison

2024 UCI Track Cycling Nations Cup

2nd Elimination, Adelaide
3rd Omnium, Adelaide
3rd Madison, Adelaide
1st Elimination, Milton
3rd Omnium, Milton
3rd Madison, Milton

2024 UCI Track Cycling World Championships

2nd Scratch
3rd Elimination
