= Amber Joseph =

Barbadian cyclist (born 1999)

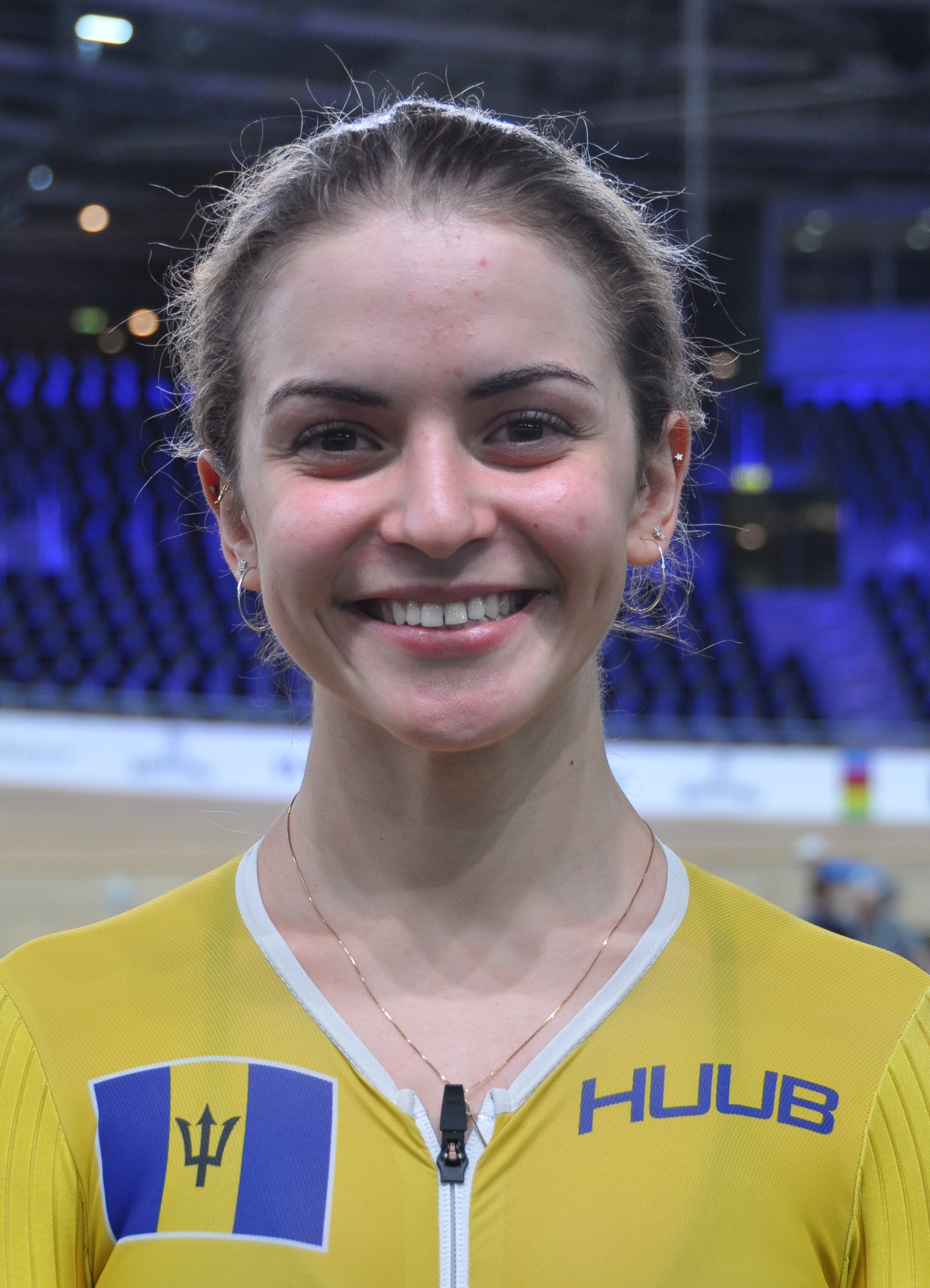
- Joseph in 2020

Personal information
- Born: 15 December 1999 (age 26) Bridgetown, Barbados
- Height: 175 cm (5 ft 9 in)
- Weight: 63 kg (139 lb)

Cycling career
- Sport: Cycling
- Disciplines: Track; Road
- Role: Rider

Amateur teams
- 2014–2015: Palmer Park Velo RT
- 2016: PMR
- 2017: Cyclism Cycling
- 2018: PMR
- 2019: Jadan–Weldtite
- 2021: L39ION of Los Angeles (guest rider)

Professional team
- 2020: WCC Team

Major wins
- One-day races and Classics National Road Race Championships (2020, 2021) National Time Trial Championships (2020, 2021)
Medal record
Men's track cycling
Representing Barbados
Pan American Championships
Gold medal – first place	2021 Lima	Scratch
Gold medal – first place	2022 Lima	Scratch
Silver medal – second place	2022 Lima	Omnium
Silver medal – second place	2022 Lima	Points race
Bronze medal – third place	2021 Lima	Points race
Bronze medal – third place	2024 Carson	Scratch

Amber Joseph (born 15 December 1999) is a Barbadian professional racing cyclist, who is currently a guest rider for L39ION of Los Angeles. She rode in the women's time trial event at the 2020 UCI Road World Championships, ultimately placing 47th out of 51 starters, with a time of 51:36.06 over the 31.7-kilometre (19.7 mi) course.

== Major results ==
2016
2nd Pan American Junior Track Championships (Omnium)
2017
Pan American Junior Track Championships

1st Omnium
1st Points race

2020
National Road Championships

1st Road Race
1st Time Trial

2021
National Road Championships

1st Road Race
1st Time Trial

2022
National Road Championships

1st Road Race
1st Time Trial
