= Chloe Moran =

Australian track cyclist (born 1998)

Personal information
- Born: 16 November 1998 (age 27) Adelaide, South Australia

Cycling career
- Sport: Cycling
- Discipline: Track cycling
- Role: Rider
Medal record
Women's track cycling
Representing Australia
Commonwealth Games
Gold medal – first place	2022 Birmingham	Team pursuit

Chloe Moran (born 16 November 1998) is an Australian track cyclist.

Moran is a Junior World Medallist, multiple National & Oceania Champion. She was a gold medalist at the 2022 Commonwealth Games in the women's team pursuit.
