= Ebtissam Mohamed =

Egyptian cyclist (born 1996)

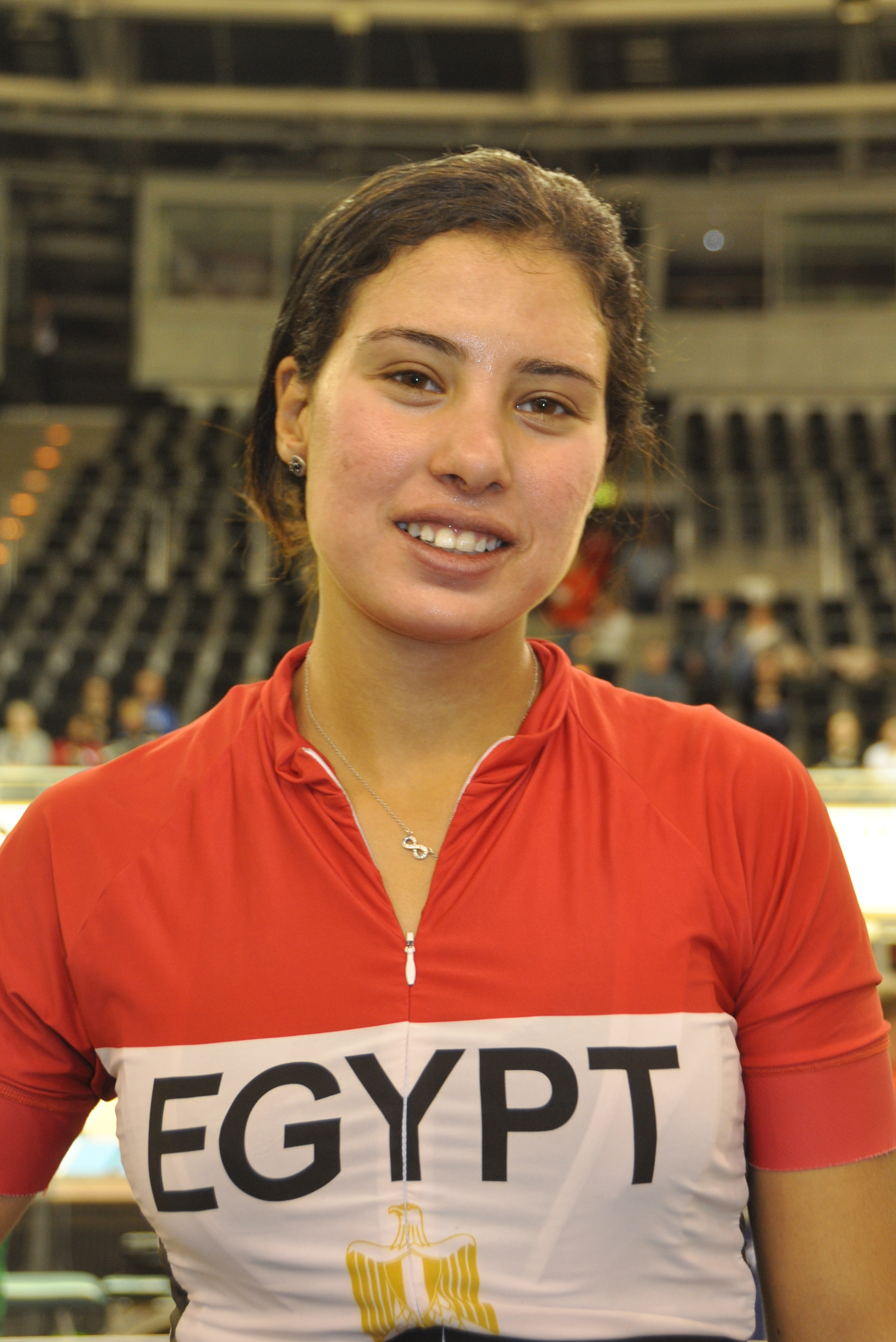
- Mohamed in 2018

Personal information
- Full name: Ebtissam Zayed Ahmed Mohamed
- Born: 25 September 1996 (age 30) Suez, Egypt

Cycling career
- Sport: Cycling
- Disciplines: Road; Track
- Role: Rider

Professional team
- 2018: Alasayl Cycling Team

Ebtissam Zayed Ahmed Mohamed (Arabic: ابتسام زايد أحمد محمد; born 25 September 1996 in Suez) is an Egyptian road and track cyclist. She competed in the women's sprint event at the 2016 Summer Olympics; she placed 27th in the qualifying round and did not reach the first round. She competed in the women's omnium event at the 2020 Summer Olympics.

For the 2021 season, Mohamed will join the Dubai Police team for its first season at UCI level.

== Major results ==
=== Track ===
2015
2nd Individual pursuit, African Track Championships

2016
African Track Championships

1st Individual sprint
1st Points race
1st Keirin
2nd Individual pursuit
2nd 500m Time trial
2nd Team sprint

2017
African Track Championships

1st Keirin
1st Individual pursuit
1st Points race
2nd Team sprint

2018
African Track Championships

1st Individual sprint
1st Points race
1st Scratch race
1st Keirin
1st Individual pursuit
1st Team sprint

2019
African Track Championships

1st Omnium
1st Points race
2nd 500m Time trial
2nd Keirin
2nd Scratch race
3rd Madison

National Track Championships

1st Omnium
1st Individual pursuit
1st 500m Time trial

2020
African Track Championships

1st Omnium
1st Points race
1st Scratch race
1st Individual pursuit
2nd Team sprint

National Track Championships

1st Omnium
1st Keirin

2021
African Track Championships

1st Omnium
1st Points race
1st Scratch race
1st Individual pursuit
1st Madison
2nd Team sprint

=== Road ===
2011
2nd Junior Road Race, Arab Cycling Championships
3rd Road Race, Pan Arabian Games

2012
Arab Cycling Championships

2nd Road Race
3rd Time Trial

2013
African Road Championships

2nd Junior Road Race
2nd Junior Time Trial

2015
1st Time Trial, Arab Cycling Championships

2017
3rd Team Time Trial, African Road Championships

2022
African Road Championships

1st Road race
2nd Time trial
3rd Team time trial
