= Aline Seitz =

Swiss cyclist (born 1997)

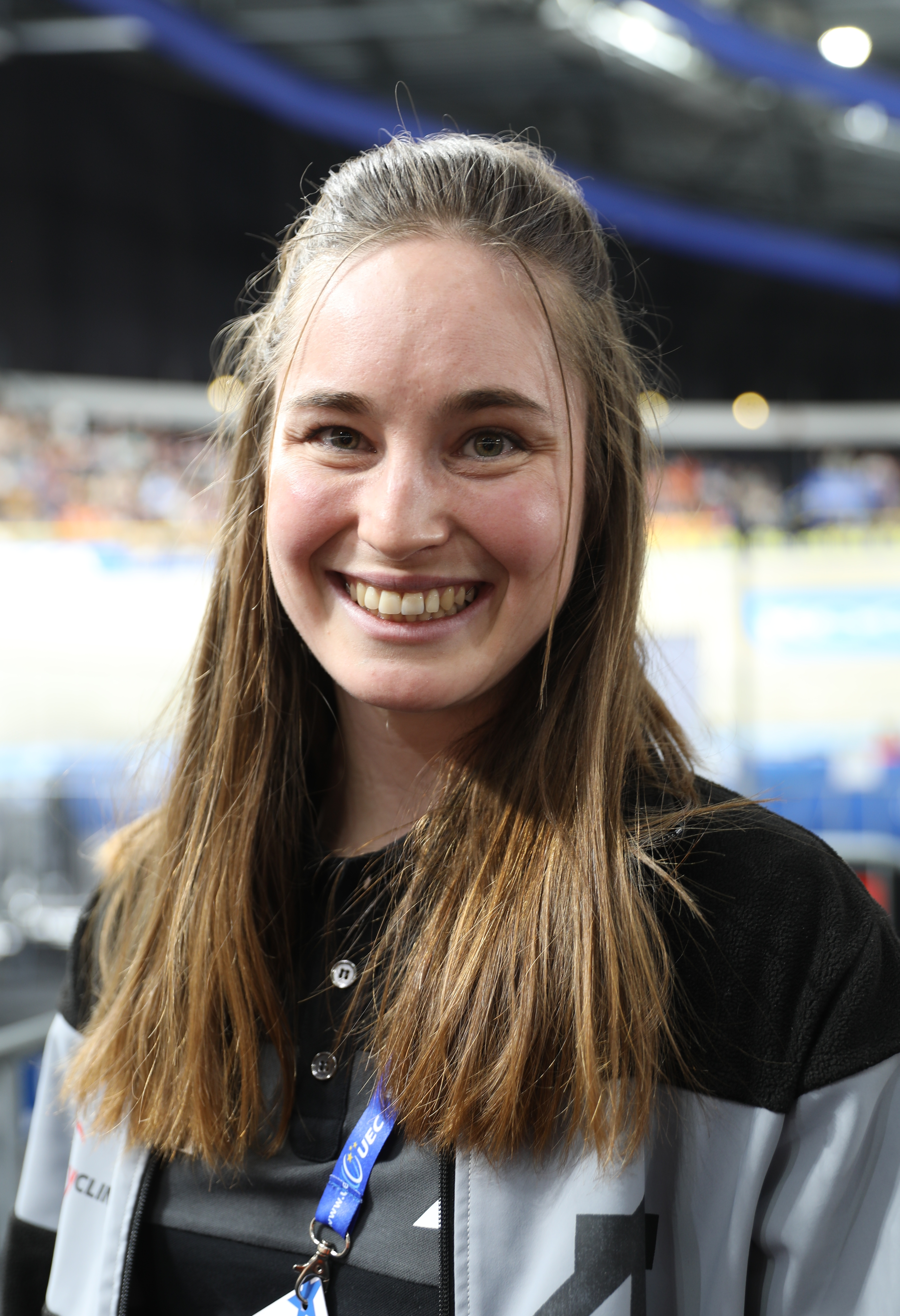
- Seitz in 2024

Personal information
- Born: 17 February 1997 (age 29)

Cycling career
- Sport: Cycling
- Current team: Israel Premier Tech Roland Development
- Disciplines: Road; Track; Mountain biking
- Role: Rider

Amateur teams
- 2016–2018: RC Gränichen
- 2019–2020: Illi-Bikes Cycling Team

Professional teams
- 2021–2022: Team Rupelcleaning–Champion Lubricants
- 2023: Israel Premier Tech Roland Development
Medal record
Women's track cycling
Representing Switzerland
European Championships
Silver medal – second place	2026 Konya	Scratch

Aline Seitz (born 17 February 1997) is a Swiss racing cyclist, who currently rides for UCI Women's Continental Team Israel Premier Tech Roland Development

Active on track, road and mountain bike, she is the Swiss champion of the Madison in 2017 and the Omnium in 2018. She rode in the women's scratch event at the 2018 UCI Track Cycling World Championships.
