= Petra Ševčíková =

Czech cyclist

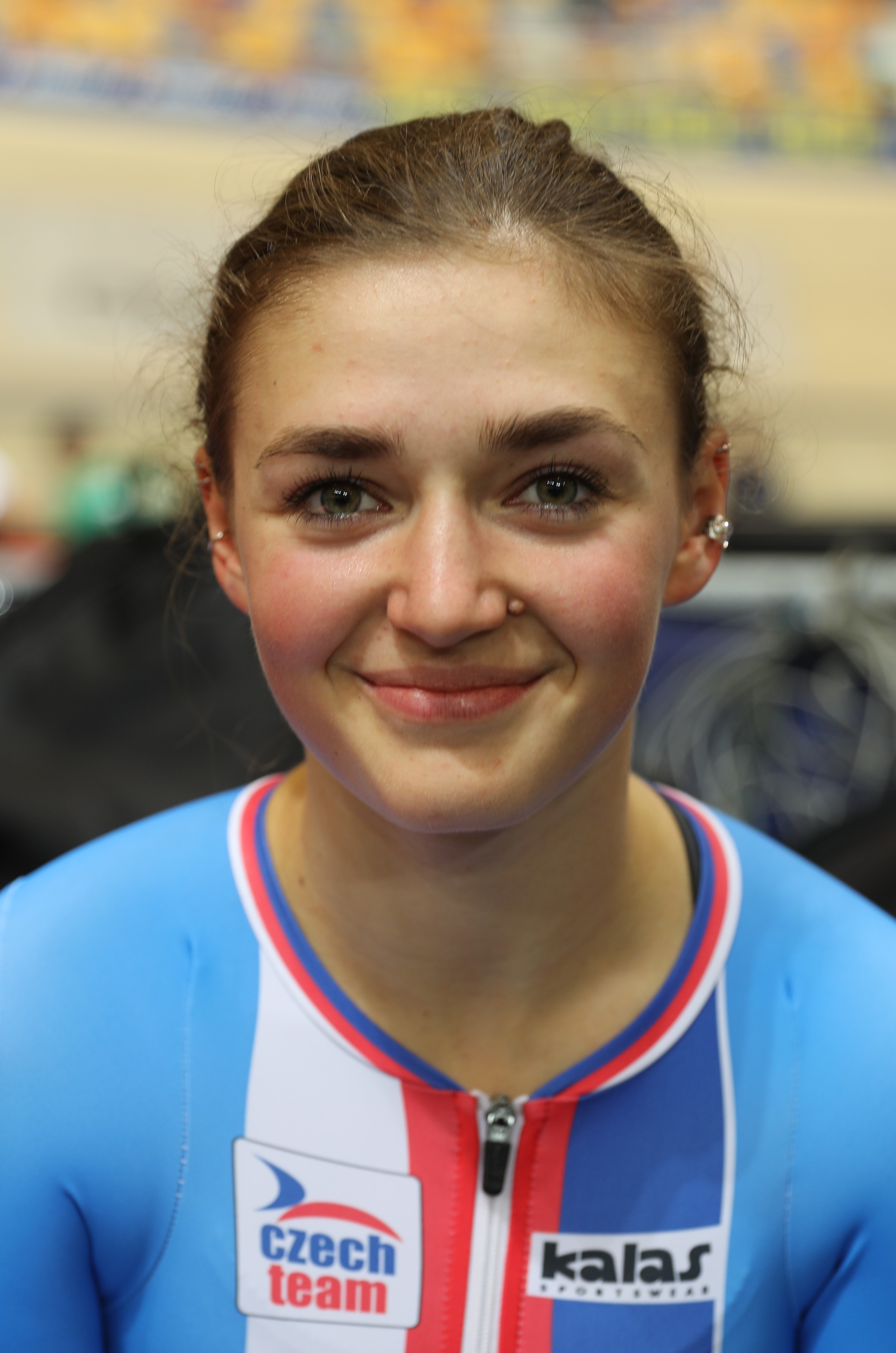
- Ševčíková in 2019

Personal information
- Born: 1 September 2000 (age 26)

Cycling career
- Sport: Cycling
- Role: Rider

Petra Ševčíková (born 1 September 2000) is a Czech racing cyclist. In November 2020, she competed in the women's team sprint event at the 2020 UEC European Track Championships in Plovdiv, Bulgaria.
