= Olivija Baleišytė =

Lithuanian cyclist (born 1998)

Olivija Baleišytė OLY
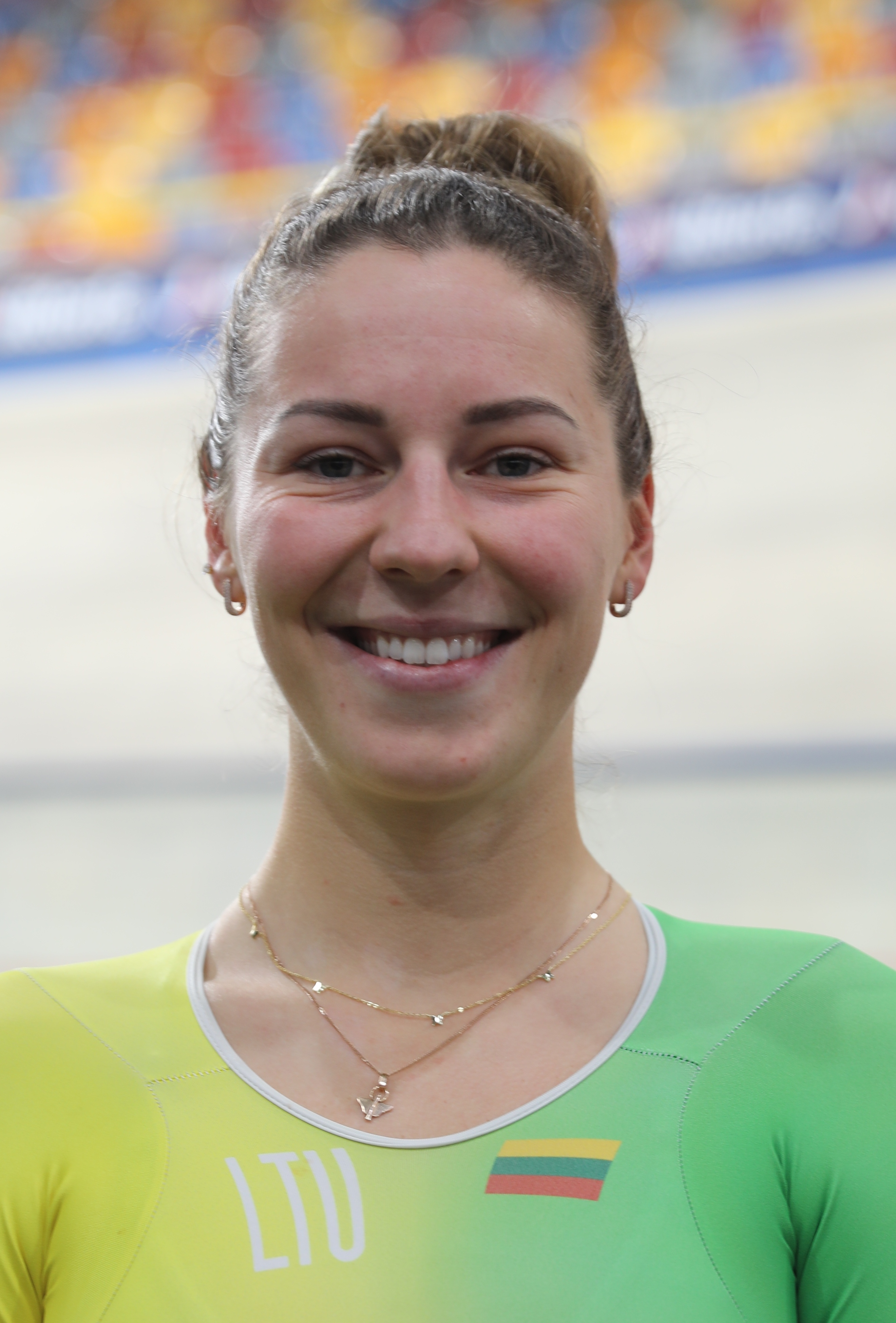
- Baleišytė in 2024

Personal information
- Full name: Olivija Baleišytė
- Born: 3 September 1998 (age 28)

Cycling career
- Sport: Cycling
- Current team: Aromitalia Vaiano
- Disciplines: Track; Road
- Role: Rider

Professional teams
- 2020: Astana
- 2021–: Aromitalia–Basso Bikes–Vaiano

Olivija Baleišytė (born 3 September 1998) is a Lithuanian road and track cyclist, who currently rides for UCI Women's Continental Team Aromitalia Vaiano. Representing Lithuania at international competitions, Baleišytė competed at the 2016 UEC European Track Championships in the elimination race and individual pursuit events. In 2020 Baleišytė was awarded the Lithuanian Cycling Federation title for Lithuanian female cyclist of the year.

== Major results ==
2015
Panevezys Track Championships

1st Omnium (Juniors)
1st Points race (Juniors)

Minsk Track Championships

1st Scratch rave (Juniors)
1st Points race (Juniors)

European Junior Track Championships

3rd Individual Pursuit

2016
European Junior Track Championships

1st Individual pursuit
2nd Omnium

2nd Points race, Prova Internacional de Anadia
2nd Omnium, Grand Prix Galichyna

2017
National Track Championships

1st Omnium
1st Individual pursuit
1st Elimination race
1st Points race
2nd Keirin
3rd Team sprint
3rd Sprint race

Grand Prix of Tula

1st Omnium
1st Scratch Race
3rd Points Race

3rd Omnium, International track race - Panevežys

2018
National Track Championships

1st Omnium
1st Scratch race
1st Elimination race
1st Points race
1st Individual pursuit
2nd Keirin
2nd Scratch race

2nd Time Trial, National Road Championships

2019
National Track Championships

1st Omnium
1st Scratch race
1st Elimination race
1st Individual pursuit
2nd Points race
