= Maria Martins (cyclist) =

Portuguese cyclist (born 1999)

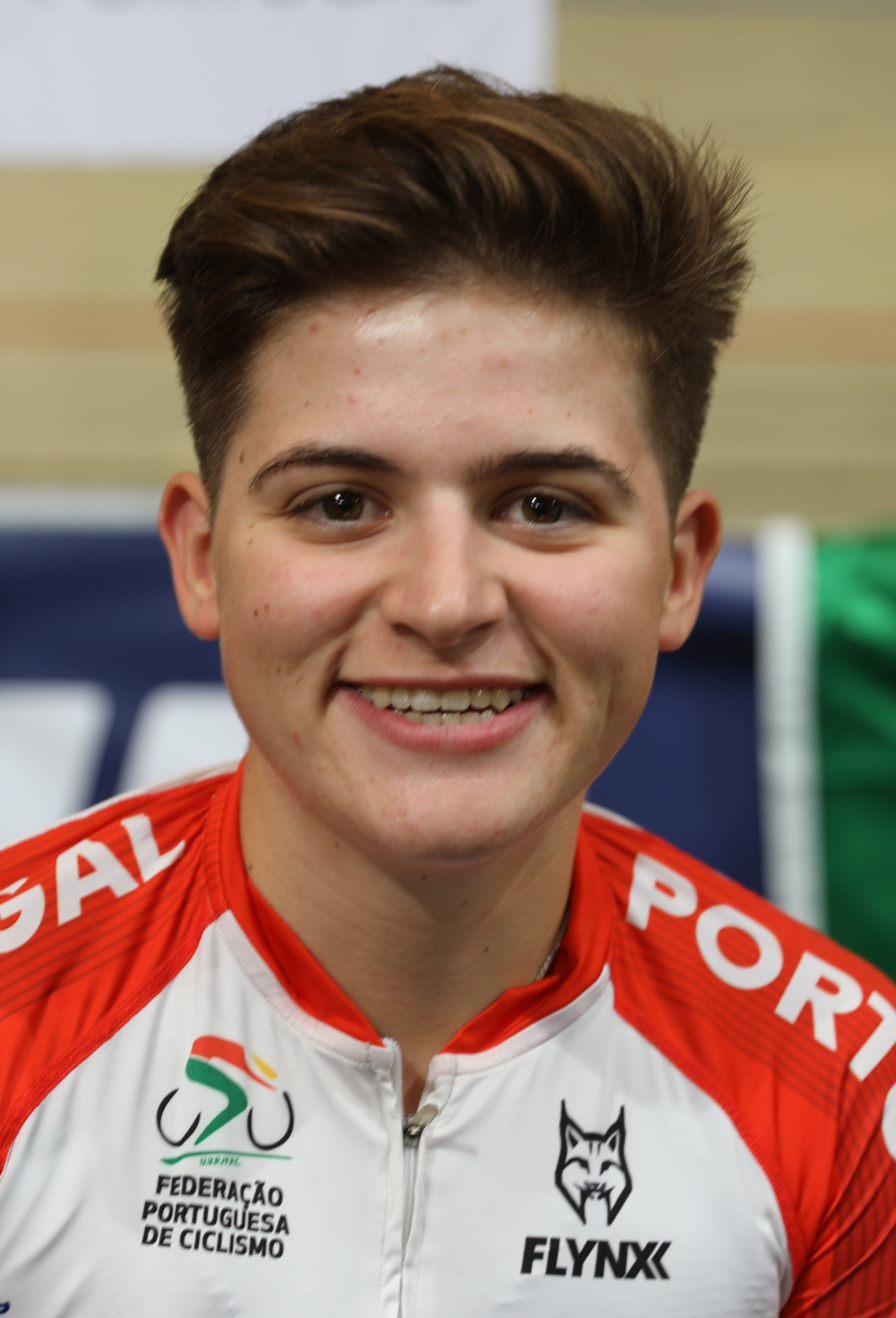
- Martins in 2019

Personal information
- Full name: Maria Carolina Cruse Ribeiro Gomes Martins
- Nickname: Tata
- Born: 9 July 1999 (age 27) Moçarria, Portugal

Cycling career
- Sport: Cycling
- Current team: Canyon//SRAM
- Disciplines: Road; Track
- Role: Rider

Professional teams
- 2018–2019: Sopela Women's Team
- 2020–2024: Drops
- 2025–: Canyon//SRAM Zondacrypto
Medal record
Women's track cycling
Representing Portugal
World Championships
Bronze medal – third place	2020 Berlin	Scratch
Bronze medal – third place	2022 Saint-Quentin-en-Yvelines	Omnium
Bronze medal – third place	2026 Shanghai	Scratch
European Championships
Gold medal – first place	2023 Grenchen	Scratch
Bronze medal – third place	2019 Apeldoorn	Scratch
Bronze medal – third place	2020 Plovdiv	Elimination
Bronze medal – third place	2025 Heusden-Zolder	Scratch

Maria Carolina Cruse Ribeiro Gomes Martins (born 9 July 1999) is a Portuguese professional racing cyclist who currently rides for UCI Women's WorldTeam Canyon//SRAM. In October 2019, she won the bronze medal in the women's scratch event at the 2019 UEC European Track Championships.

== Major results ==
=== Road ===
2017
7th Road race, EUC European Junior Road Championships
2018
National Road Championships

2nd Road race
2nd Time trial

2019
2nd Clasica Femenina Navarra
4th Road race, EUC European Under–23 Road Championships
2021
1st Road race, National Road Championships
3rd Ronde de Mouscron
2022
5th Classic Brugge–De Panne
8th GP Oetingen

=== Track ===
2018
UEC European Track Championships - u23

3rd Scratch race

2019
UEC European Track Championships

3rd Scratch Race

UEC European Track Championships - u23

2nd Elimination race

2020
UCI World Championships

3rd Scratch Race

UEC European Track Championships

3rd Elimination Race

UEC European Track Championships - u23

2nd Elimination race
3rd Scratch race

2021
Olympic Games

7th Omnium

UEC European Track Championships - u23

1st Omnium
2nd Scratch race
2nd Elimination race
