= 2024 UCI Track Cycling World Championships – Women's madison =

Women's madison at the 2024 UCI Track Cycling World Championships
- Venue: Ballerup Super Arena
- Location: Ballerup, Denmark
- Dates: 19 October
- Competitors: 17 from 17 nations
- Teams: 17
- Winning points: 46

Medalists
gold medal	Amalie Dideriksen; Julie Norman Leth	Denmark
silver medal	Victoire Berteau; Marion Borras	France
bronze medal	Neah Evans; Katie Archibald	Great Britain

The Women's madison competition at the 2024 UCI Track Cycling World Championships was held on 19 October 2024.

== Results ==
The race was started at 19:10.

Rank	Riders	Nation	Lap points	Sprint points	Total points
1st place, gold medalist(s)	Amalie Dideriksen; Julie Norman Leth	Denmark	20	26	46
2nd place, silver medalist(s)	Victoire Berteau; Marion Borras	France	20	23	43
3rd place, bronze medalist(s)	Neah Evans; Katie Archibald	Great Britain	20	22	42
4	Marit Raaijmakers; Lisa van Belle	Netherlands	20	19	39
5	Chiara Consonni; Vittoria Guazzini	Italy	20	9	29
6	Jennifer Valente; Megan Jastrab	United States	0	9	9
7	Lara Gillespie; Mia Griffin	Ireland	0	4	4
8	Katrijn de Clercq; Hélène Hesters	Belgium	0	3	3
9	Alexandra Manly; Keira Will	Australia	0	2	2
10	Lea Lin Teutenberg; Lena Reissner	Germany	0	1	1
11	Olga Wankiewicz; Patrycja Lorkowska	Poland	0	0	0
12	Michelle Andres; Aline Seitz	Switzerland	0	0	0
13	Mizuki Ikeda; Tsuyaka Uchino	Japan	–20	2	–18
14	Petra Ševčíková; Gabriela Bártová	Czech Republic	–40	2	–38
15	Lee Sze Wing; Leung Wing Yee	Hong Kong	–60	0	–60
–	Eva Anguela; Laura Rodríguez	Spain	Did not finish		
–	Lily Plante; Kiara Lylyk	Canada	Did not finish		
