= 2025 UEC European Track Championships – Women's madison =

Women's madison at the 2025 UEC European Track Championships
- Venue: Velodroom Limburg, Heusden-Zolder
- Date: 16 February
- Competitors: 26 from 13 nations
- Teams: 13
- Winning points: 62

Medalists
gold medal	Lisa van Belle; Maike van der Duin	Netherlands
silver medal	Chiara Consonni; Vittoria Guazzini	Italy
bronze medal	Victoire Berteau; Marion Borras	France

The women's madison competition at the 2025 UEC European Track Championships was held on 16 February 2025.

== Results ==
120 laps (30 km) with 12 sprints were raced.

Rank	Name	Nation	Lap points	Sprint points	Finish order	Total points
1st place, gold medalist(s)	Lisa van Belle; Maike van der Duin	Netherlands	40	22	1	62
2nd place, silver medalist(s)	Chiara Consonni; Vittoria Guazzini	Italy	20	33	2	53
3rd place, bronze medalist(s)	Victoire Berteau; Marion Borras	France	20	22	3	42
4	Amalie Dideriksen; Ellen Klinge	Denmark	20	21	4	41
5	Lara Gillespie; Mia Griffin	Ireland	20	12	9	32
6	Neah Evans; Maddie Leech	Great Britain	20	11	7	31
7	Michelle Andres; Aline Seitz	Switzerland	0	8	5	8
8	Katrijn De Clercq; Hélène Hesters	Belgium	0	8	12	8
9	Messane Bräutigam; Lena Charlotte Reißner	Germany	0	6	10	6
10	Maja Tracka; Olga Wankiewicz	Poland	–20	0	6	–20
11	Gabriela Bártová; Barbora Němcová	Czech Republic	–40	0	8	–40
12	Eva Anguela; Laura Rodríguez	Spain	–40	0	11	–40
13	Anna Kolyzhuk; Kateryna Velychko	Ukraine	–40	0	–	DNF
