= Cycling at the 2024 Summer Olympics – Women's Madison =

Women's Madison at the Games of the XXXIII Olympiad
- Olympic track cycling
- Venues: Vélodrome National de Saint-Quentin-en-Yvelines
- Date: 9 August 2024

Medalists
1st place, gold medalist(s)		Chiara Consonni, Vittoria Guazzini	Italy
2nd place, silver medalist(s)		Elinor Barker, Neah Evans	Great Britain
3rd place, bronze medalist(s)		Lisa van Belle, Maike van der Duin	Netherlands

The women's Madison event at the 2024 Summer Olympics took place on 9 August 2024 at the Vélodrome National de Saint-Quentin-en-Yvelines.

== Background ==
This was the second appearance of the event after it was introduced at the 2020 Olympics.

== Competition format ==
A madison race is a tag team points race that involves all 16 teams competing at once. One cyclist from each team competes at a time; the two team members can swap at any time by touching (including pushing and hand-slinging). The distance is 120 laps (30 km). Teams score points in two ways: lapping the field and sprints. A team that gains a lap on the field earns 20 points; one that loses a lap has 20 points deducted. Every 10th lap is a sprint, with the first to finish the lap earning 5 points, second 3 points, third 2 points, and fourth 1 point. The points values are doubled for the final sprint. There is only one round of competition.

== Schedule ==
All times are Central European Time (UTC+2)

Date	Time	Round
9 August 2024	18:09	Final

== Results ==
Rank	Cyclist	Nation	Sprint												Laps		Finish order	Total
Rank	Cyclist	Nation	1	2	3	4	5	6	7	8	9	10	11	12	+	−	Finish order	Total
1st place, gold medalist(s)	Chiara Consonni; Vittoria Guazzini	Italy	2	5							5		5		20		7	37
2nd place, silver medalist(s)	Elinor Barker; Neah Evans	Great Britain	5		3	3			3	5	1	1		10			1	31
3rd place, bronze medalist(s)	Lisa van Belle; Maike van der Duin	Netherlands			1			2	5						20		8	28
4	Jennifer Valente; Lily Williams	United States		2	2		3	5		2	2			2			4	18
5	Marion Borras; Clara Copponi	France	3		5		1		1	1			2	4			3	17
6	Amalie Dideriksen; Julie Norman Leth	Denmark		3		5	2							6			2	16
7	Daria Pikulik; Wiktoria Pikulik	Poland				2		1	2	3	3		3				5	14
8	Bryony Botha; Emily Shearman	New Zealand	1				5						1				6	7
9	Georgia Baker; Alexandra Manly	Australia				1		3				2					13	6
10	Katrijn De Clercq; Hélène Hesters	Belgium										5					12	5
11	Lara Gillespie; Alice Sharpe	Ireland										3					10	3
12	Maho Kakita; Tsuyaka Uchino	Japan		1													14	1
13	Franziska Brauße; Lena Reißner	Germany															9	0
14	Michelle Andres; Aline Seitz	Switzerland															11	0
15	Ariane Bonhomme; Maggie Coles-Lyster	Canada														40	DNF	
