= 2025 UEC European Track Championships – Women's points race =

Women's points race at the 2025 UEC European Track Championships
- Venue: Velodroom Limburg, Heusden-Zolder
- Date: 15 February
- Competitors: 19 from 19 nations
- Winning points: 56

Medalists
gold medal	Anita Stenberg	Norway
silver medal	Marion Borras	France
bronze medal	Maike van der Duin	Netherlands

The women's points race competition at the 2025 UEC European Track Championships was held on 15 February 2025.

== Results ==
100 laps (25 km) were raced with 10 sprints.

Rank	Name	Nation	Lap points	Sprint points	Finish order	Total points
1st place, gold medalist(s)	Anita Stenberg	Norway	40	16	2	56
2nd place, silver medalist(s)	Marion Borras	France	40	14	3	54
3rd place, bronze medalist(s)	Maike van der Duin	Netherlands	40	13	5	53
4	Lara Gillespie	Ireland	40	10	7	50
5	Grace Lister	Great Britain	40	6	8	46
6	Valeria Valgonen	Individual Neutral Athletes	20	5	12	25
7	Lea Lin Teutenberg	Germany	20	1	15	21
8	Jarmila Machačová	Czech Republic	20	0	13	20
9	Maria Martins	Portugal	0	19	1	19
10	Michelle Andres	Switzerland	0	8	11	8
11	Lani Wittevrongel	Belgium	0	6	4	6
12	Ellen Hjøllund Klinge	Denmark	0	6	10	6
13	Ainara Albert	Spain	0	5	16	5
14	Nikol Płosaj	Poland	0	5	17	5
15	Martina Alzini	Italy	0	4	18	4
16	Hanna Tserakh	Individual Neutral Athletes	0	3	6	3
17	Alžbeta Bačíková	Slovakia	0	0	9	0
18	Kateryna Velychko	Ukraine	–20	0	14	–20
–	Lauryna Valiukevičiūtė	Lithuania	ABD			
