= 2022 UEC European Track Championships – Women's team pursuit =

Women's team pursuit at the 2022 UEC European Track Championships
- Venue: Messe München, Munich
- Date: 11–12 August
- Competitors: 40 from 9 nations
- Winning time: 4:10.872

Medalists
gold medal	Franziska Brauße; Lisa Brennauer; Lisa Klein; Mieke Kröger	Germany
silver medal	Rachele Barbieri; Vittoria Guazzini; Letizia Paternoster; Silvia Zanardi; Martina Fidanza	Italy
bronze medal	Victoire Berteau; Marion Borras; Clara Copponi; Valentine Fortin	France

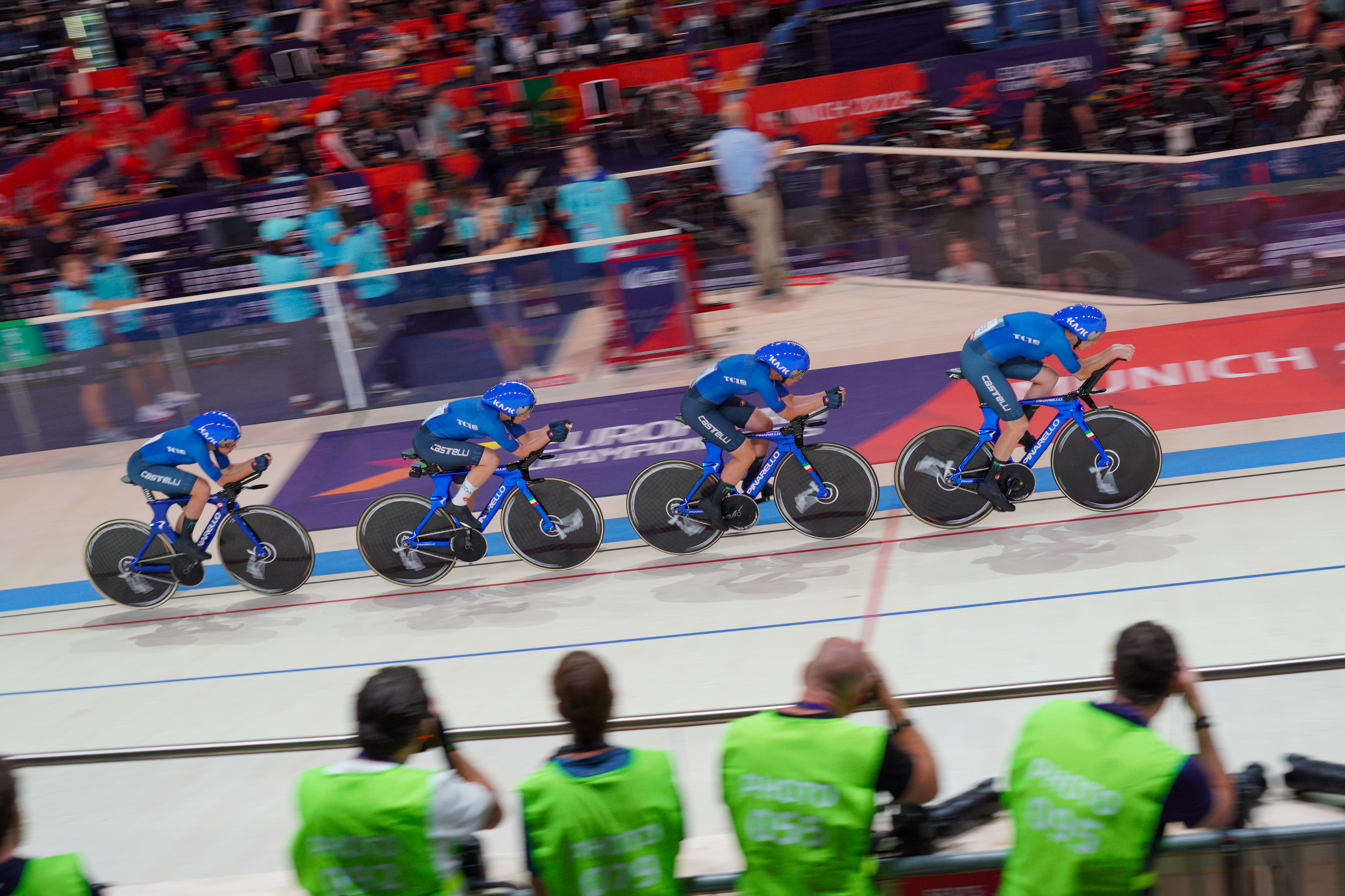
UEC Track Elite European Championships

The women's team pursuit competition at the 2022 UEC European Track Championships was held on 11 and 12 August 2022.

== Results ==
=== Qualifying ===
The eight fastest teams advanced to the first round.

Rank	Nation	Time	Behind	Notes
1	Germany; Franziska Brauße; Lisa Brennauer; Lisa Klein; Mieke Kröger	4:14.688		Q
2	Italy; Rachele Barbieri; Martina Fidanza; Vittoria Guazzini; Letizia Paternoster	4:16.510	+1.822	Q
3	France; Victoire Berteau; Marion Borras; Clara Copponi; Valentine Fortin	4:18.074	+3.386	Q
4	Great Britain; Neah Evans; Josie Knight; Anna Morris; Jessica Roberts	4:19.800	+5.112	Q
5	Netherlands; Mylène de Zoete; Daniek Hengeveld; Marit Raaijmakers; Amber van der Hulst	4:23.843	+9.155	q
6	Ireland; Mia Griffin; Emily Kay; Kelly Murphy; Alice Sharpe	4:26.028	+11.340	q
7	Poland; Daria Pikulik; Wiktoria Pikulik; Nikol Płosaj; Tamara Szalińska	4:30.952	+16.264	q
8	Switzerland; Michelle Andres; Fabienne Buri; Léna Mettraux; Aline Seitz	4:33.154	+18.465	q
9	Spain; Tania Calvo; Ziortza Isasi; Eukene Larrarte; Isabel Martín	4:37.811	+23.122	

=== First round ===
First round heats were held as follows:
Heat 1: 6th v 7th fastest
Heat 2: 5th v 8th fastest
Heat 3: 2nd v 3rd fastest
Heat 4: 1st v 4th fastest

The winners of heats 3 and 4 proceeded to the gold medal race. The remaining six teams were ranked on time, from which the top two proceeded to the bronze medal race.

Heat	Rank	Nation	Time	Notes
1	1	Ireland; Lara Gillespie; Mia Griffin; Kelly Murphy; Alice Sharpe	4:25.530	
1	2	Poland; Wiktoria Pikulik; Nikol Płosaj; Tamara Szalińska; Olga Wankiewicz	OVL	
2	1	Netherlands; Mylène de Zoete; Daniek Hengeveld; Lonneke Uneken; Amber van der Hulst	4:22.280	
2	2	Switzerland; Michelle Andres; Fabienne Buri; Léna Mettraux; Aline Seitz	OVL	
3	1	Italy; Rachele Barbieri; Vittoria Guazzini; Letizia Paternoster; Silvia Zanardi	4:14.442	QG
3	2	France; Victoire Berteau; Marion Borras; Clara Copponi; Valentine Fortin	4:14.489	QB
4	1	Germany; Franziska Brauße; Lisa Brennauer; Lisa Klein; Mieke Kröger	4:14.665	QG
4	2	Great Britain; Neah Evans; Josie Knight; Anna Morris; Jessica Roberts	4:18.455	QB

=== Finals ===
Rank	Nation	Time	Behind	Notes
Gold medal final
1st place, gold medalist(s)	Germany; Franziska Brauße; Lisa Brennauer; Lisa Klein; Mieke Kröger	4:10.872		
2nd place, silver medalist(s)	Italy; Rachele Barbieri; Vittoria Guazzini; Letizia Paternoster; Silvia Zanardi	4:11.571	+0.699	
Bronze medal final
3rd place, bronze medalist(s)	France; Victoire Berteau; Marion Borras; Clara Copponi; Valentine Fortin			
4	Great Britain; Neah Evans; Josie Knight; Anna Morris; Jessica Roberts	OVL		
