= 2022 UEC European Track Championships – Women's madison =

Women's madison at the 2022 UEC European Track Championships
- Venue: Messe München, Munich
- Date: 16 August
- Competitors: 24 from 12 nations
- Teams: 12
- Winning points: 41

Medalists
gold medal	Silvia Zanardi; Rachele Barbieri	Italy
silver medal	Clara Copponi; Marion Borras	France
bronze medal	Amalie Dideriksen; Julie Leth	Denmark

The women's madison competition at the 2022 UEC European Track Championships was held on 16 August 2022.

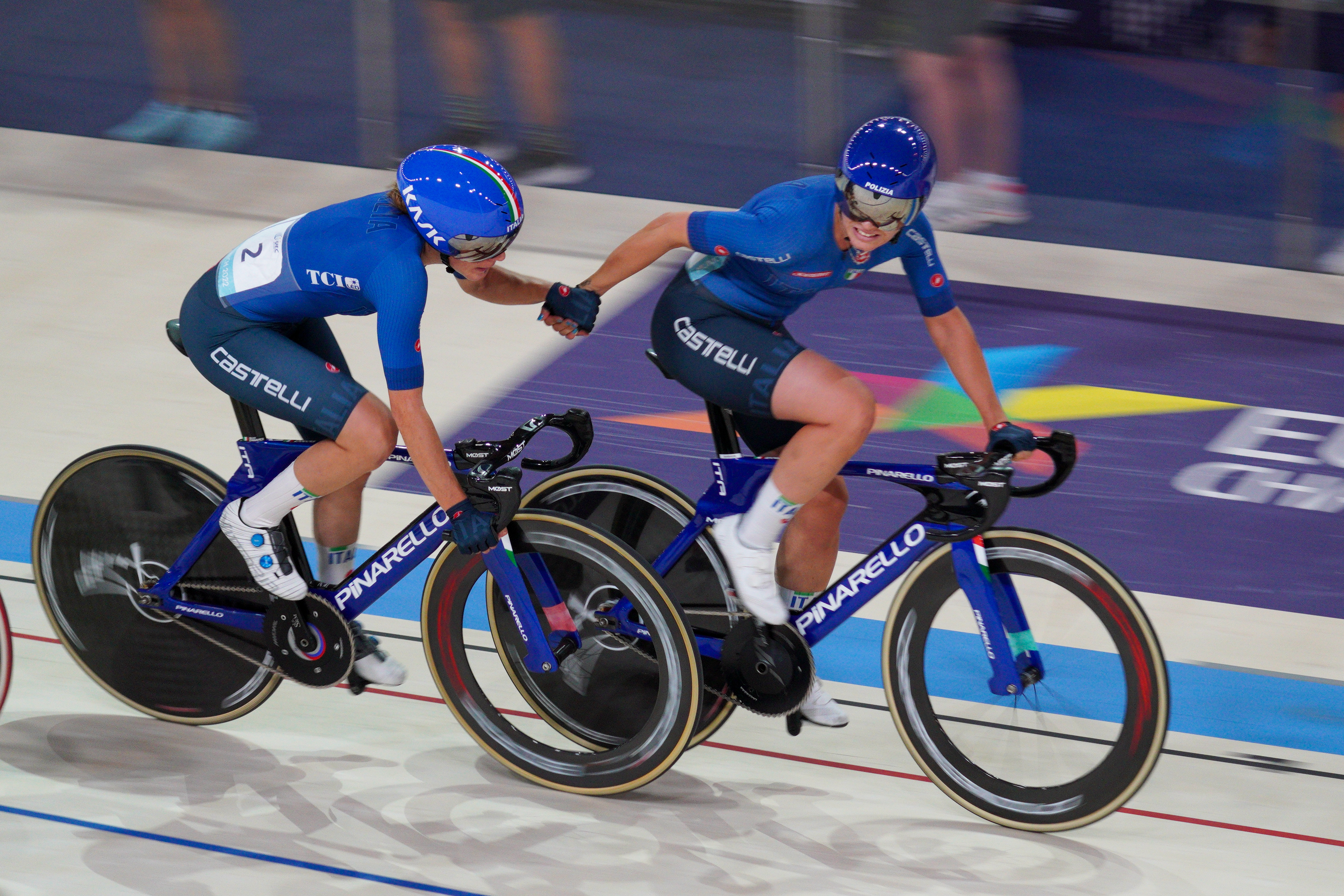
UEC Track Elite European Championships

== Results ==
150 laps (30 km) with 15 sprints were raced.

Rank	Name	Nation	Lap points	Sprint points	Finish order	Total points
1st place, gold medalist(s)	Silvia Zanardi; Rachele Barbieri	Italy	0	41	2	41
2nd place, silver medalist(s)	Clara Copponi; Marion Borras	France	0	40	3	40
3rd place, bronze medalist(s)	Amalie Dideriksen; Julie Leth	Denmark	0	38	1	38
4	Pfeiffer Georgi; Neah Evans	Great Britain	20	16	5	36
5	Daria Pikulik; Wiktoria Pikulik	Poland	0	29	4	29
6	Lea Lin Teutenberg; Franziska Brausse	Germany	0	6	6	6
7	Michelle Andres; Aline Seitz	Switzerland	–20	2	7	–18
8	Lonneke Uneken; Marit Raaijmakers	Netherlands	–40	4	8	–36
9	Mia Griffin; Lara Gillespie	Ireland	–40	0	10	–40
10	Katrijn De Clercq; Marith Vanhove	Belgium	–120	0	11	–120
11	Tania Calvo; Eva Anguela	Spain	–140	0	9	–140
12	Verena Eberhardt; Kathrin Schweinberger	Austria	–140	0	12	–140
