= 2024 UCI Track Cycling World Championships – Women's points race =

Women's points race at the 2024 UCI Track Cycling World Championships
- Venue: Ballerup Super Arena
- Location: Ballerup, Denmark
- Dates: 20 October
- Competitors: 24 from 24 nations
- Winning points: 43

Medalists
gold medal	Julie Norman Leth	Denmark
silver medal	Lotte Kopecky	Belgium
bronze medal	Lara Gillespie	Ireland

The Women's points race competition at the 2024 UCI Track Cycling World Championships was held on 20 October 2024.

== Results ==
The race was started at 13:56.

Rank	Name	Nation	Lap points	Sprint points	Total points
1st place, gold medalist(s)	Julie Norman Leth	Denmark	40	3	43
2nd place, silver medalist(s)	Lotte Kopecky	Belgium	20	20	40
3rd place, bronze medalist(s)	Lara Gillespie	Ireland	20	19	39
4	Ally Wollaston	New Zealand	20	19	39
5	Victoire Berteau	France	20	14	34
6	Alexandra Manly	Australia	20	8	28
7	Marit Raaijmakers	Netherlands	20	7	27
8	Neah Evans	Great Britain	20	7	27
9	Mizuki Ikeda	Japan	20	5	25
10	Jennifer Valente	United States	20	4	24
11	Lea Lin Teutenberg	Germany	20	4	24
12	Daniela Campos	Portugal	20	1	21
13	Anita Stenberg	Norway	20	1	21
14	Martina Alzini	Italy	0	5	5
15	Akvilė Gedraitytė	Lithuania	20	−20	3
16	Michelle Andres	Switzerland	0	0	0
17	Lily Plante	Canada	0	0	0
18	Ainara Albert Bosch	Spain	0	0	0
19	Leung Wing Yee	Hong Kong	0	0	0
20	Jarmila Machačová	Czech Republic	0	0	0
21	Tetiana Yashchenko	Ukraine	−20	1	−19
22	Zuzanna Chylińska	Poland	−20	0	−20
23	María Gaxiola	Mexico	−60	0	−60
–	Fanny Cauchois	Laos	Did not finish		
