= 2022 UCI Track Cycling World Championships – Women's points race =

Women's points race at the 2022 UCI Track Cycling World Championships
- Venue: Vélodrome National
- Location: Saint-Quentin-en-Yvelines, France
- Dates: 16 October
- Competitors: 24 from 24 nations
- Winning points: 60

Medalists
gold medal	Neah Evans	Great Britain
silver medal	Julie Leth	Denmark
bronze medal	Jennifer Valente	United States

The Women's points race competition at the 2022 UCI Track Cycling World Championships will be held on 16 October 2022.

== Results ==
The race was started at 13:30.

Rank	Name	Nation	Lap points	Sprint points	Total points
1st place, gold medalist(s)	Neah Evans	Great Britain	40	20	60
2nd place, silver medalist(s)	Julie Leth	Denmark	40	13	53
3rd place, bronze medalist(s)	Jennifer Valente	United States	40	11	51
4	Lotte Kopecky	Belgium	40	10	50
5	Daniek Hengeveld	Netherlands	40	6	46
6	Silvia Zanardi	Italy	20	14	34
7	Anita Stenberg	Norway	20	7	27
8	Victoire Berteau	France	20	5	25
9	Bryony Botha	New Zealand	20	5	25
10	Yareli Acevedo	Mexico	20	3	23
11	Karolina Karasiewicz	Poland	0	12	12
12	Maggie Coles-Lyster	Canada	0	8	8
13	Tsuyaka Uchino	Japan	0	4	4
14	Verena Eberhardt	Austria	0	3	3
15	Amber Joseph	Barbados	0	0	0
16	Kateřina Kohoutková	Czech Republic	0	0	0
17	Léna Mettraux	Switzerland	0	0	0
18	Ziortza Isasi	Spain	0	0	0
19	Daniela Campos	Portugal	0	0	0
20	Chloe Moran	Australia	0	0	0
21	Yanina Kuskova	Uzbekistan	0	0	0
–	Rinata Sultanova	Kazakhstan	Did not finish		
–	Fanny Cauchois	Laos	Did not finish		
–	Treasure Melubari Coxson	Nigeria	Did not finish		
