= 2025 UEC European Track Championships – Women's elimination race =

Women's elimination race at the 2025 UEC European Track Championships
- Venue: Velodroom Limburg, Heusden-Zolder
- Date: 13 February
- Competitors: 20 from 20 nations

Medalists
gold medal	Lara Gillespie	Ireland
silver medal	Hélène Hesters	Belgium
bronze medal	Lisa van Belle	Netherlands

The women's elimination race competition at the 2025 UEC European Track Championships was held on 13 February 2025.

== Results ==
Rank	Name	Nation
1st place, gold medalist(s)	Lara Gillespie	Ireland
2nd place, silver medalist(s)	Hélène Hesters	Belgium
3rd place, bronze medalist(s)	Lisa van Belle	Netherlands
4	Lorena Leu	Switzerland
5	Anita Stenberg	Norway
6	Anita Baima	Italy
7	Clémence Chereau	France
8	Lea Lin Teutenberg	Germany
9	Neah Evans	Great Britain
10	Maja Tracka	Poland
11	Anna Hansen	Denmark
12	Barbora Němcová	Czech Republic
13	Maria Martins	Portugal
14	Alžbeta Bačíková	Slovakia
15	Eva Anguela	Spain
16	Akvilė Gedraitytė	Lithuania
17	Tetiana Yashchenko	Ukraine
18	Valeria Valgonen	Individual Neutral Athletes 2
19	Karalina Biryuk	Individual Neutral Athletes 1
20	Marija Pavlović	Serbia
