= 2024 UEC European Track Championships – Women's omnium =

Women's omnium at the 2024 UEC European Track Championships
- Venue: Apeldoorn, Netherlands
- Date: 12 January
- Competitors: 19 from 19 nations
- Winning points: 142

Medalists
gold medal	Anita Stenberg	Norway
silver medal	Neah Evans	Great Britain
bronze medal	Valentine Fortin	France

The women's omnium competition at the 2024 UEC European Track Championships was held on 12 January 2024.

== Results ==
=== Scratch race ===
Rank	Name	Nation	Laps down	Event points
1	Anita Stenberg	Norway		40
2	Letizia Paternoster	Italy		38
3	Daria Pikulik	Poland		36
4	Neah Evans	Great Britain		34
5	Lara Gillespie	Ireland		32
6	Aline Seitz	Switzerland		30
7	Marit Raaijmakers	Netherlands		28
8	Valentine Fortin	France		26
9	Lotte Kopecky	Belgium		24
10	Olivija Baleišytė	Lithuania		22
11	Lea Teutenberg	Germany		20
12	Petra Ševčíková	Czech Republic		18
13	Eukene Larrarte	Spain		16
14	Maria Martins	Portugal		14
15	Alžbeta Bačíková	Slovakia		12
16	Leila Gschwentner	Austria		10
17	Tetiana Yashchenko	Ukraine		8
18	Argyro Milaki	Greece		6
19	Ellen Klinge	Denmark		4

=== Tempo race ===
Rank	Name	Nation	Points in race	Event points
1	Valentine Fortin	France	23	40
2	Anita Stenberg	Norway	22	38
3	Petra Ševčíková	Czech Republic	22	36
4	Neah Evans	Great Britain	22	34
5	Marit Raaijmakers	Netherlands	21	32
6	Maria Martins	Portugal	21	30
7	Eukene Larrarte	Spain	4	28
8	Lotte Kopecky	Belgium	3	26
9	Lara Gillespie	Ireland	3	24
10	Daria Pikulik	Poland	2	22
11	Letizia Paternoster	Italy	2	20
12	Lea Teutenberg	Germany	1	18
13	Olivija Baleišytė	Lithuania	0	16
14	Aline Seitz	Switzerland	0	14
15	Ellen Klinge	Denmark	0	12
16	Leila Gschwentner	Austria	0	10
17	Argyro Milaki	Greece	0	8
18	Alžbeta Bačíková	Slovakia	0	6
19	Tetiana Yashchenko	Ukraine	–20	4

=== Elimination race ===
Rank	Name	Nation	Event points
1	Lotte Kopecky	Belgium	40
2	Letizia Paternoster	Italy	38
3	Anita Stenberg	Norway	36
4	Neah Evans	Great Britain	34
5	Valentine Fortin	France	32
6	Maria Martins	Portugal	30
7	Daria Pikulik	Poland	28
8	Olivija Baleišytė	Lithuania	26
9	Aline Seitz	Switzerland	24
10	Lara Gillespie	Ireland	22
11	Petra Ševčíková	Czech Republic	20
12	Ellen Klinge	Denmark	18
13	Alžbeta Bačíková	Slovakia	16
14	Marit Raaijmakers	Netherlands	14
15	Lea Teutenberg	Germany	12
16	Argyro Milaki	Greece	10
17	Eukene Larrarte	Spain	8
18	Leila Gschwentner	Austria	6
19	Tetiana Yashchenko	Ukraine	4

=== Points race ===
Overall rank	Name	Nation	Scratch race	Tempo race	Elim. race	Subtotal	Lap points	Sprint points	Finish order	Total points
1st place, gold medalist(s)	Anita Stenberg	Norway	40	38	36	114	20	8	5	142
2nd place, silver medalist(s)	Neah Evans	Great Britain	34	34	34	102	20	14	4	136
3rd place, bronze medalist(s)	Valentine Fortin	France	26	40	32	98	20	13	2	131
4	Lara Gillespie	Ireland	32	24	22	78	40	12	3	130
5	Daria Pikulik	Poland	18	36	34	86	20	23	1	129
6	Letizia Paternoster	Italy	38	20	38	96	20	3	7	119
7	Lotte Kopecky	Belgium	24	26	40	90	20	5	6	115
8	Maria Martins	Portugal	14	30	30	74	20	4	14	98
9	Marit Raaijmakers	Netherlands	28	32	14	74	20	2	11	96
10	Aline Seitz	Switzerland	30	14	24	68	20	3	15	91
11	Olivija Baleišytė	Lithuania	22	16	26	64	20	1	8	85
12	Lea Teutenberg	Germany	20	18	12	50	20	6	16	76
13	Petra Ševčíková	Czech Republic	18	36	20	74	0	0	13	74
14	Eukene Larrarte	Spain	18	36	20	74	0	0	13	57
15	Ellen Klinge	Denmark	4	12	18	34	20	0	9	54
16	Alžbeta Bačíková	Slovakia	12	6	16	34	–20	0	17	14
17	Leila Gschwentner	Austria	10	10	6	26	–20	0	12	6
18	Argyro Milaki	Greece	6	8	10	24	–20	0	10	4
	Tetiana Yashchenko	Ukraine	8	4	4	16	0	0	DNF	DNF
