= 2025 UCI Track Cycling World Championships – Women's elimination =

Women's elimination at the 2025 UCI Track Cycling World Championships
- Venue: Velódromo Peñalolén
- Location: Santiago, Chile
- Dates: 23 October
- Competitors: 24 from 24 nations

Medalists
gold medal	Lara Gillespie	Ireland
silver medal	Katie Archibald	Great Britain
bronze medal	Hélène Hesters	Belgium

The Women's elimination competition at the 2025 UCI Track Cycling World Championships was held on 23 October 2025.

== Results ==
The race was started at 18:55.

Rank	Name	Nation
1st place, gold medalist(s)	Lara Gillespie	Ireland
2nd place, silver medalist(s)	Katie Archibald	Great Britain
3rd place, bronze medalist(s)	Hélène Hesters	Belgium
4	Victoire Berteau	France
5	Olivija Baleišytė	Lithuania
6	Lea Lin Teutenberg	Germany
7	Chiara Consonni	Italy
8	Maja Tracka	Poland
9	Lorena Leu	Switzerland
10	Megan Jastrab	United States
11	Yareli Acevedo	Mexico
12	Yumi Kajihara	Japan
13	Laura Rodríguez	Spain
14	Alžbeta Bačíková	Slovakia
15	Anita Stenberg	Norway
16	Barbora Němcová	Czech Republic
17	Alyssa Polites	Australia
18	Scarlet Cortés	Chile
19	Ebtissam Mohamed	Egypt
20	Bryony Botha	New Zealand
21	Lisa van Belle	Netherlands
22	Fiona Majendie	Canada
23	Laura Auerbach-Lind	Denmark
24	Valeria Valgonen	Individual Neutral Athletes
