= 2021 European Road Championships – Mixed team relay =

Mixed team relay
2021 European Road Championships

Race details
- Dates: 8 September 2021
- Stages: 1
- Distance: 44.8 km (27.84 mi)

Medalists
| | Gold | Italy |
| | Silver | Germany |
| | Bronze | Netherlands |

The mixed team relay event at the 2021 European Road Championships took place on 8 September 2021, in Trentino, Italy.

== Participation ==
Nations were allowed to enter a maximum of one team, composed of six riders (three women and three men), each. Riders could be drawn from the elite or under-23 categories, but not the junior category.

== Results ==
The event started on 8 September 2021, at 14:30.

| Rank | # | Team | Time | Diff. |
|---|---|---|---|---|
| 1st place, gold medalist(s) | 7 | Italy; Matteo Sobrero; Filippo Ganna; Alessandro De Marchi; Elena Cecchini; Marta Cavalli; Elisa Longo Borghini | 51:59.01 | |
| 2nd place, silver medalist(s) | 8 | Germany; Miguel Heidemann; Justin Wolf; Max Walscheid; Corinna Lechner; Mieke Kröger; Tanja Erath | 52:20.08 | +00:21 |
| 3rd place, bronze medalist(s) | 4 | Netherlands; Koen Bouwman; Jos van Emden; Bauke Mollema; Floortje Mackaij; Amy Pieters; Demi Vollering | 52:25.28 | +00:27 |
| 4 | 6 | France; Bruno Armirail; Benjamin Thomas; Alexis Gougeard; Eugénie Duval; Coralie Demay; Gladys Verhulst | 53:27.52 | +01:29 |
| 5 | 1 | Austria; Maximilian Schmidbauer; Felix Ritzinger; Felix Gall; Sarah Rijkes; Kathrin Schweinberger; Christina Schweinberger | 55:23.13 | +03:25 |
| 6 | 2 | Russia; Petr Rikunov; Artem Ovechkin; Pavel Kochetkov; Tamara Dronova; Tatiana Antoshina; Margarita Syradoeva | 55:33.88 | +03:35 |
| 7 | 5 | Ukraine; Daniil Nikulin; Mykhaylo Kononenko; Oleksandr Golovash; Valeriya Kononenko; Hanna Solovey; Olga Shekel | 55:34.01 | +03:35 |
| 8 | 3 | Poland; Damian Bieniek; Damian Sławek; Damian Papierski; Dorota Przęzak; Paulina Pastuszek; Patrycja Lorkowska | 55:51.69 | +03:53 |
