= 2021 UCI Track Cycling World Championships – Women's madison =

Track Cycling World Championship

Women's madison at the 2021 UCI Track Cycling World Championships
- Venue: Vélodrome Couvert Régional Jean Stablinski
- Location: Roubaix, France
- Dates: 23 October 2021
- Competitors: 38 from 19 nations
- Teams: 19
- Winning points: 35

Medalists
gold medal	Amy Pieters; Kirsten Wild	Netherlands
silver medal	Clara Copponi; Marie Le Net	France
bronze medal	Katie Archibald; Neah Evans	Great Britain

The Women's madison competition at the 2021 UCI Track Cycling World Championships was held on 23 October 2021.

== Results ==
=== Qualifying ===
The first eight teams qualify for the final.

==== Heat 1 ====
The race was started at 11:04.

Rank	Riders	Nation	Laps points	Sprint points	Total points	Notes
1	Amy Pieters; Kirsten Wild	Netherlands	0	19	19	Q
2	Daria Pikulik; Wiktoria Pikulik	Poland	0	12	12	Q
3	Katie Archibald; Neah Evans	Great Britain	0	12	12	Q
4	Kseniia Fedotova; Tetyana Klimchenko	Ukraine	0	10	10	Q
5	Letizia Paternoster; Rachele Barbieri	Italy	0	8	8	Q
6	Ally Wollaston; Michaela Drummond	New Zealand	0	5	5	Q
7	Hanna Tserakh; Nastassia Kiptsikava	Belarus	0	4	4	Q
8	Eukene Larrarte; Ziortza Isasi	Spain	0	3	3	Q
9	Kendall Ryan; Lily Williams	United States	0	2	2	
10	Emily Kay; Alice Sharpe	Ireland	0	2	2	

==== Heat 2 ====
The race was started at 11:24.

Rank	Riders	Nation	Laps points	Sprint points	Total points	Notes
1	Georgia Baker; Alexandra Manly	Australia	0	27	27	Q
2	Clara Copponi; Marie Le Net	France	20	6	26	Q
3	Maria Novolodskaya; Mariia Miliaeva	Russian Cycling Federation	0	15	15	Q
4	Amalie Dideriksen; Julie Leth	Denmark	0	10	10	Q
5	Shari Bossuyt; Katrijn De Clercq	Belgium	0	8	8	Q
6	Lea Lin Teutenberg; Lena Charlotte Reißner	Germany	0	7	7	Q
7	Michelle Andres; Léna Mettraux	Switzerland	0	4	4	Q
8	Petra Ševčíková; Jarmila Machačová	Czech Republic	0	0	0	
–	Victoria Velasco; Yareli Acevedo	Mexico	−40	Did not finish		

=== Final ===
The final was started at 18:10. 120 laps (30 km) with 12 sprints were raced.

Rank	Riders	Nation	Laps points	Sprint points	Total points
1st place, gold medalist(s)	Amy Pieters; Kirsten Wild	Netherlands	0	35	35
2nd place, silver medalist(s)	Clara Copponi; Marie Le Net	France	0	30	30
3rd place, bronze medalist(s)	Katie Archibald; Neah Evans	Great Britain	0	24	24
4	Letizia Paternoster; Rachele Barbieri	Italy	0	23	23
5	Amalie Dideriksen; Julie Leth	Denmark	0	11	11
6	Georgia Baker; Alexandra Manly	Australia	0	5	5
7	Maria Novolodskaya; Mariia Miliaeva	Russian Cycling Federation	–20	14	–6
8	Shari Bossuyt; Katrijn De Clercq	Belgium	–20	1	–19
9	Ally Wollaston; Michaela Drummond	New Zealand	–20	0	–20
10	Lea Lin Teutenberg; Lena Charlotte Reißner	Germany	–40	0	–40
11	Michelle Andres; Léna Mettraux	Switzerland	–40	0	–40
–	Daria Pikulik; Wiktoria Pikulik	Poland	Did not finish		
–	Hanna Tserakh; Nastassia Kiptsikava	Belarus	Did not finish		
–	Kseniia Fedotova; Tetyana Klimchenko	Ukraine	Did not finish		
–	Eukene Larrarte; Ziortza Isasi	Spain	Did not finish		
