= 2026 UEC European Track Championships – Women's scratch =

Women's scratch at the 2026 UEC Track Elite European Championships
- Venue: Konya Velodrome, Konya
- Date: 1 February
- Competitors: 22

Medalists
gold medal	Hélène Hesters	Belgium
silver medal	Aline Seitz	Switzerland
bronze medal	Lena Charlotte Reißner	Germany

The women's scratch competition at the 2026 UEC European Track Championships was held on 1 February 2026.

== Results ==
First rider across the line without a net lap loss wins.

Rank	Name	Nation	Laps down
1st place, gold medalist(s)	Hélène Hesters	Belgium	
2nd place, silver medalist(s)	Aline Seitz	Switzerland	
3rd place, bronze medalist(s)	Lena Charlotte Reißner	Germany	
4	Olivija Baleišytė	Lithuania	
5	Anita Baima	Italy	
6	Anita Stenberg	Norway	
7	Petra Ševčíková	Czech Republic	
8	Sofie van Rooijen	Netherlands	
9	Valeriya Valgonen	Individual Neutral Athletes	
10	Emma Jeffers	Ireland	
11	Eliza Rabażyńska	Poland	
12	Imogen Wolff	Great Britain	
13	Hanna Tserakh	Individual Neutral Athletes	
14	Anna Kolyzhuk	Ukraine	
15	Eva Anguela	Spain	
16	Lucy Nelson	Bulgaria	
17	Valentine Fortin	France	
18	Daniela Campos	Portugal	
19	Laura Auerbach-Lind	Denmark	
20	Gwen Nothum	Luxembourg	
21	Stanislava Sikelová	Slovakia	Did not finish
21	Reyhan Yakışır	Turkey	Did not finish
