= Alessandro De Marchi (cyclist) =

Italian road racing cyclist

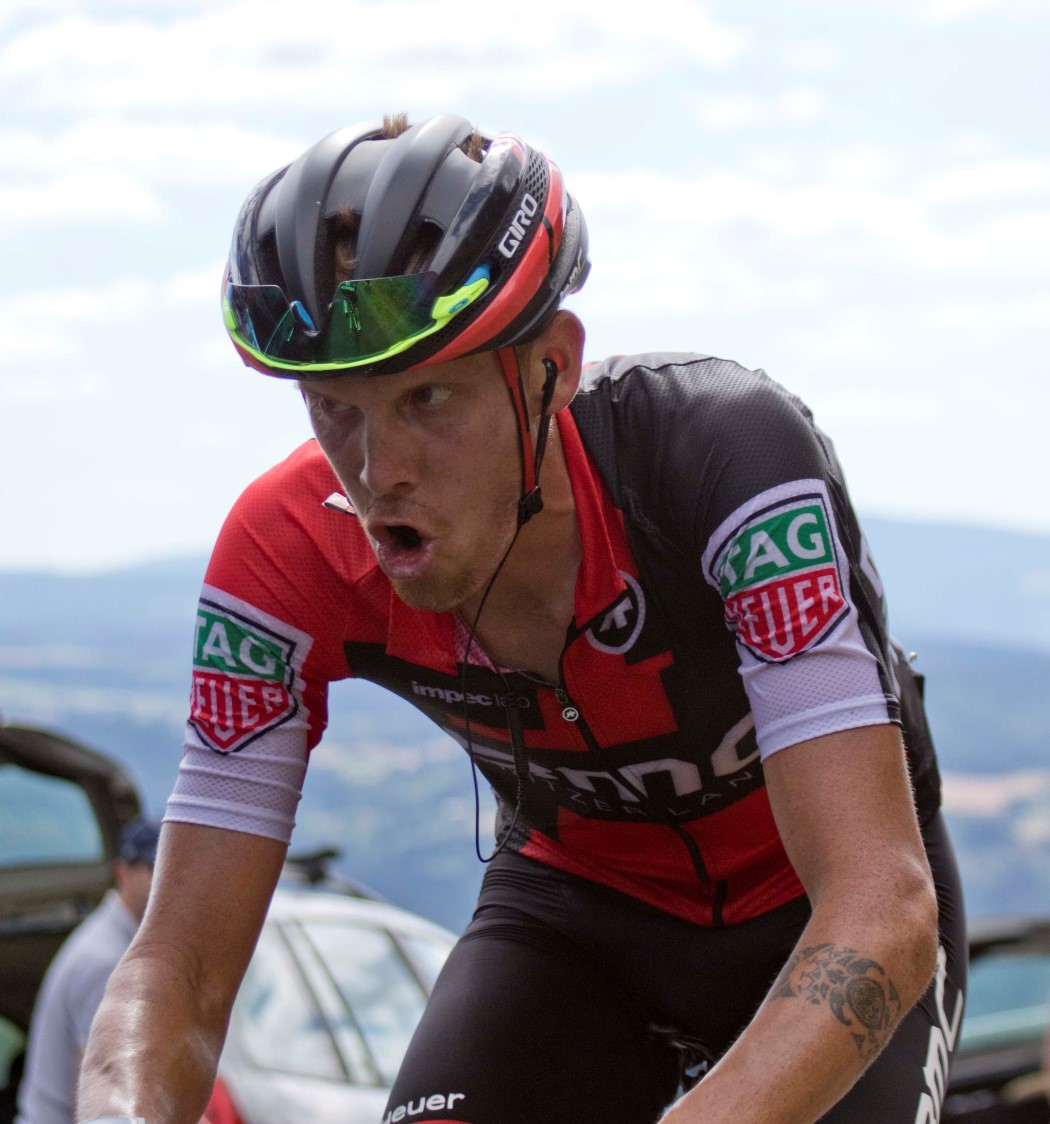
- De Marchi at the 2017 Tour de France

Personal information
- Full name: Alessandro De Marchi
- Born: 19 May 1986 (age 40) San Daniele del Friuli, Italy
- Height: 1.81 m (5 ft 11 in)
- Weight: 66 kg (146 lb; 10.4 st)

Cycling career
- Sport: Cycling
- Current team: {Retired}
- Disciplines: Road; Track
- Role: Rider
- Rider type: Breakaway specialist

Amateur teams
- 2005–2008: Permac–Brisot–Bibanese
- 2009–2010: Team Friuli
- 2010: Androni Giocattoli (stagiaire)

Professional teams
- 2011–2012: Androni Giocattoli
- 2013–2014: Cannondale
- 2015–2020: BMC Racing Team
- 2021–2022: Israel Start-Up Nation
- 2023–2025: Team Jayco–AlUla

Major wins
- Grand Tours Tour de France Combativity award (2014) Vuelta a España 3 individual stages (2014, 2015, 2018) 2 TTT stages (2015, 2017) One-day races and Classics Giro dell'Emilia (2018) Tre Valli Varesine (2021)
Medal record
Road cycling
Representing Italy
European Championships
Gold medal – first place	2021 Trentino	Mixed team relay

Alessandro De Marchi (born 19 May 1986) is a retired Italian professional road and track bicycle racer who most lately rode for UCI WorldTeam Team Jayco–AlUla.

== Career ==
Born in San Daniele del Friuli, De Marchi has competed as a professional since the start of the 2011 season, joining the Androni Giocattoli squad after a stagiaire spell with the team at the end of the 2010 season.

In the 2012 Giro d'Italia, De Marchi twice featured in a breakaway, during the fifth and fourteenth stages. In the latter stage, De Marchi made it to the end of the stage with the breakaway and finished third, behind Andrey Amador and Jan Bárta; the result came on his 26th birthday.

In the 2014 Tour de France, De Marchi was twice declared the 'most combative' rider of a stage, and earned the Tour's overall combativity award. De Marchi claimed his first Grand Tour stage win on Stage 7 of the 2014 Vuelta a España via an early breakaway and he finished solo.

BMC Racing Team announced that De Marchi would be joining them for the 2015 season.

In September 2020, De Marchi signed a two-year contract with the Israel Start-Up Nation team.

After a strong result in stage 4 of the 2021 Giro d'Italia, De Marchi wore the pink leader's jersey for the following 2 stages. Early in stage 12 of the same race, De Marchi crashed and was taken away in an ambulance. His team later reported that he had broken his right collarbone, six ribs and his first two thoracic vertebrae.

== Major results ==
=== Gravel ===
2022
7th UCI World Championships
2023
9th UCI World Championships

=== Road ===
2008
1st GP Folignano
6th Trofeo Gianfranco Bianchin
10th Overall Giro del Friuli-Venezia Giulia
2009
4th Ruota d'Oro
4th Zagreb–Ljubljana
7th Gran Premio di Poggiana
8th Giro del Casentino
2010
3rd Overall Tour of Romania
2011
1st Stage 1b (TTT) Settimana Internazionale di Coppi e Bartali
7th Giro dell'Appennino
2013 (1 pro win)
1st Stage 8 Critérium du Dauphiné
4th Road race, National Championships
6th Prueba Villafranca de Ordizia
2014 (1)
1st Stage 7 Vuelta a España
1st Mountains classification, Critérium du Dauphiné
9th Overall Tour des Fjords
Tour de France

Combativity award Stages 13, 14 & Overall

2015 (1)
Vuelta a España

1st Stages 1 (TTT) & 14

2016
1st Stage 1 (TTT) Tirreno–Adriatico
6th Overall Tour La Provence
9th Giro di Lombardia
2017
1st Stage 1 (TTT) Vuelta a España
1st Stage 2 (TTT) Volta a Catalunya
1st Stage 1 (TTT) Volta a la Comunitat Valenciana
2018 (2)
1st Giro dell'Emilia
1st Stage 11 Vuelta a España
1st Stage 1 (TTT) Tour de Suisse
1st Stage 3 (TTT) Volta a la Comunitat Valenciana
4th Time trial, National Championships
2019
3rd Time trial, National Championships
7th Amstel Gold Race
2020
2nd Time trial, National Championships
9th Gran Trittico Lombardo
2021 (1)
1st Team relay, UEC European Championships
1st Tre Valli Varesine
1st Mountains classification, Tour of the Alps
1st Stage 1b (TTT) Settimana Internazionale di Coppi e Bartali
2nd Giro della Toscana
3rd Chrono des Nations
4th Overall Tour Poitou-Charentes en Nouvelle-Aquitaine
Giro d'Italia

Held after Stages 4–5

2022
5th Giro del Veneto
Combativity award Stage 10 Giro d'Italia
Combativity award Stage 4 Vuelta a España
2024 (1)
1st Stage 2 Tour of the Alps

==== Grand Tour general classification results timeline ====
Grand Tour	2011	2012	2013	2014	2015	2016	2017	2018	2019	2020	2021	2022	2023	2024
Giro d'Italia	109	98	—	—	—	94	—	65	—	—	DNF	92	38	51
Tour de France	—	—	71	52	—	—	99	—	DNF	100	—	—	—	
Vuelta a España	—	—	—	67	78	—	70	76	—	—	—	103	—	

Legend
—	Did not compete
DNF	Did not finish

=== Track ===
2007
1st Team pursuit, National Championships
Athens Open Balkan Championship

1st Team pursuit
3rd Individual pursuit

2011
National Championships

1st Team pursuit
2nd Individual pursuit
