= 2021 UEC European Track Championships – Women's individual pursuit =

Women's individual pursuit at the 2021 UEC European Track Championships
- Venue: Tissot Velodrome, Grenchen
- Date: 8 October
- Competitors: 17 from 12 nations
- Winning time: 3:19.548

Medalists
gold medal	Lisa Brennauer	Germany
silver medal	Marion Borras	France
bronze medal	Mieke Kröger	Germany

The women's individual pursuit competition at the 2021 UEC European Track Championships was held on 8 October 2021.

== Results ==
=== Qualifying ===
The first two racers raced for gold, the third and fourth fastest rider raced for the bronze medal.

Rank	Name	Nation	Time	Behind	Notes
1	Lisa Brennauer	Germany	3:18.538		QG
2	Marion Borras	France	3:20.780	+2.242	QG
3	Mieke Kröger	Germany	3:21.742	+3.204	QB
4	Martina Alzini	Italy	3:28.206	+9.668	QB
5	Letizia Paternoster	Italy	3:29.725	+11.187	
6	Kelly Murphy	Ireland	3:30.737	+12.199	
7	Daniek Hengeveld	Netherlands	3:31.957	+13.419	
8	Mia Griffin	Ireland	3:32.244	+13.706	
9	Megan Barker	Great Britain	3:33.025	+14.487	
10	Karolina Karasiewicz	Poland	3:33.795	+15.257	
11	Aksana Salauyeva	Belarus	3:34.153	+15.615	
12	Fabienne Buri	Switzerland	3:36.944	+18.406	
13	Katrijn De Clercq	Belgium	3:38.591	+20.053	
14	Madelaine Leech	Great Britain	3:38.789	+20.251	
15	Cybèle Schneider	Switzerland	3:39.123	+20.585	
16	Viktoriia Yaroshenko	Ukraine	3:40.247	+21.709	
17	Eukene Larrarte	Spain	3:43.831	+25.293	
	Karolina Kumięga	Poland	Did not start		

=== Finals ===
Rank	Name	Nation	Time	Behind	Notes
Gold medal final
1st place, gold medalist(s)	Lisa Brennauer	Germany	3:19.548		
2nd place, silver medalist(s)	Marion Borras	France	3:23.297	+3.749	
Bronze medal final
3rd place, bronze medalist(s)	Mieke Kröger	Germany	3:21.646		
4	Martina Alzini	Italy	OVL		
