= 2021 UEC European Track Championships – Women's elimination race =

Women's elimination race at the 2021 UEC European Track Championships
- Venue: Tissot Velodrome, Grenchen
- Date: 6 October
- Competitors: 19 from 19 nations

Medalists
gold medal	Valentine Fortin	France
silver medal	Letizia Paternoster	Italy
bronze medal	Neah Evans	Great Britain

The women's elimination race competition at the 2021 UEC European Track Championships was held on 6 October 2021.

== Results ==
Rank	Name	Nation
1st place, gold medalist(s)	Valentine Fortin	France
2nd place, silver medalist(s)	Letizia Paternoster	Italy
3rd place, bronze medalist(s)	Neah Evans	Great Britain
4	Nikol Płosaj	Poland
5	Eukene Larrarte	Spain
6	Kseniia Fedotova	Ukraine
7	Alžbeta Bačíková	Slovakia
8	Olivija Baleišytė	Lithuania
9	Maria Martins	Portugal
10	Lena Charlotte Reißner	Germany
13	Petra Ševčíková	Czech Republic
13	Mylène de Zoete	Netherlands
13	Anita Stenberg	Norway
14	Aksana Salauyeva	Belarus
15	Tamara László	Hungary
16	Mariia Miliaeva	Russia
17	Katrijn De Clercq	Belgium
18	Mia Griffin	Ireland
19	Michelle Andres	Switzerland
