= 2018 Festival Elsy Jacobs =

2018 Festival Luxembourgeois du cyclisme féminin Elsy Jacobs
Race details
- Dates: 27–29 April 2018
- Stages: 3 (including 1 prologue)

Results
Jersey awarded to the overall winner	Winner	Letizia Paternoster (ITA)	(Astana)
	Second	Christine Majerus (LUX)	(Boels–Dolmans)
	Third	Alexis Ryan (USA)	(Canyon//SRAM)
Jersey awarded to the points classification winner	Points	Letizia Paternoster (ITA)	(Astana)
Jersey awarded to the mountains classification winner	Mountains	Sofia Bertizzolo (ITA)	(Astana)
Jersey awarded to the youth classification winner	Youth	Letizia Paternoster (ITA)	(Astana)

The 2018 Festival Luxembourgeois du cyclisme féminin Elsy Jacobs was a women's cycle stage race that was held in Luxembourg from 27 to 29 April 2018. The 2018 edition of the race was the 11th running of the Festival Elsy Jacobs, being held with a UCI rating of 2.1.

== Teams ==
A total of 20 teams competed in the race, including 15 UCI Women's Teams.

UCI Women's Teams

- Astana
- Bepink
- Boels–Dolmans
- BTC City Ljubljana
- Canyon//SRAM
- Cervélo–Bigla Pro Cycling
- Experza–Footlogix
- Health Mate–Cyclelive Team
- Lotto–Soudal Ladies
- Movistar Team
- Parkhotel Valkenburg
- Trek–Drops
- Valcar–PBM
- WaowDeals Pro Cycling
- WNT–Rotor Pro Cycling

National teams

- Great Britain
- Denmark
- Norway

Other teams

- Jos Feron Lady Force
- Maaslandster International

== Route ==
Stage schedule
Stage	Date	Route	Distance	Type	Winner
P	27 April	Cessange to Cessange	2.8 km (1.7 mi)	Prologue	Lisa Klein (GER)
1	28 April	Steinfort to Steinfort	97.7 km (60.7 mi)	Hilly stage	Christine Majerus (LUX)
2	29 April	Garnich to Garnich	111.1 km (69.0 mi)	Hilly stage	Letizia Paternoster (ITA)

== Classification leadership table ==
Stage	Winner	General classification	Points classification	Mountain classification	Young rider classification
P	Lisa Klein	Lisa Klein	Lisa Klein	Not awarded	Lisa Klein
1	Christine Majerus	Christine Majerus	Christine Majerus	Sofia Bertizzolo	Lisa Klein
2	Letizia Paternoster	Letizia Paternoster	Letizia Paternoster	Sofia Bertizzolo	Letizia Paternoster
Final		Letizia Paternoster	Letizia Paternoster	Sofia Bertizzolo	Letizia Paternoster

== See also ==
- 2018 in women's road cycling
