= 2018 UEC European Track Championships – Women's team pursuit =

Women's team pursuit at the 2018 UEC European Track Championships
- Venue: Sir Chris Hoy Velodrome, Glasgow
- Date: 2–3 August
- Competitors: 42 from 10 nations
- Winning time: 4:16.896

Medalists
| gold medal | Katie Archibald; Laura Kenny; Elinor Barker; Neah Evans; Ellie Dickinson | Great Britain |
| silver medal | Letizia Paternoster; Silvia Valsecchi; Marta Cavalli; Elisa Balsamo | Italy |
| bronze medal | Charlotte Becker; Gudrun Stock; Mieke Kröger; Lisa Brennauer | Germany |

The women's team pursuit competition at the 2018 UEC European Track Championships was held on 2 and 3 August 2018.

== Results ==
=== Qualifying ===
The eight fastest teams advanced to the first round.

| Rank | Name | Nation | Time | Behind | Notes |
|---|---|---|---|---|---|
| 1 | Katie Archibald; Elinor Barker; Laura Kenny; Ellie Dickinson | Great Britain | 4:19.330 | | Q |
| 2 | Letizia Paternoster; Elisa Balsamo; Marta Cavalli; Silvia Valsecchi | Italy | 4:21.928 | +2.598 | Q |
| 3 | Charlotte Becker; Lisa Brennauer; Mieke Kröger; Gudrun Stock | Germany | 4:25.187 | +5.857 | Q |
| 4 | Laurie Berthon; Pascale Jeuland; Victoire Berteau; Coralie Demay | France | 4:27.310 | +7.980 | Q |
| 5 | Daria Pikulik; Nikol Płosaj; Łucja Pietrzak; Justyna Kaczkowska | Poland | 4:27.786 | +8.456 | q |
| 6 | Lotte Kopecky; Gilke Croket; Shari Bossuyt; Annelies Dom | Belgium | 4:31.147 | +11.817 | q |
| 7 | Evgenia Augustinas; Aleksandra Goncharova; Gulnaz Badykova; Anastasiia Iakovenko | Russia | 4:31.382 | +12.052 | q |
| 8 | Hanna Solovey; Oksana Kliachina; Valeriya Kononenko; Anna Nahirna | Ukraine | 4:32.314 | +12.984 | q |
| 9 | Hanna Tserakh; Ina Savenka; Polina Pivovarova; Anastasiya Dzedzikava | Belarus | 4:34.097 | +14.767 | |
| 10 | Mia Griffin; Hilary Hughes; Alice Sharpe; Orla Walsh | Ireland | 4:57.325 | +37.995 | |

=== First round ===
First round heats were held as follows:
Heat 1: 6th v 7th fastest
Heat 2: 5th v 8th fastest
Heat 3: 2nd v 3rd fastest
Heat 4: 1st v 4th fastest

- The four fastest qualifiers were placed in heats 3 and 4, while the next four were placed in heats 1 and 2.
- The winners of heats 3 and 4 qualify for the gold medal race, while the two fastest remaining teams, regardless of heat, progress to the bronze medal race.

| Rank | Heat | Name | Nation | Time | Notes |
|---|---|---|---|---|---|
| 1 | 4 | Katie Archibald; Elinor Barker; Laura Kenny; Neah Evans | Great Britain | 4:17.882 | QG |
| 2 | 3 | Letizia Paternoster; Elisa Balsamo; Marta Cavalli; Silvia Valsecchi | Italy | 4:21.005 | QG |
| 3 | 3 | Charlotte Becker; Lisa Brennauer; Mieke Kröger; Gudrun Stock | Germany | 4:23.754 | QB |
| 4 | 2 | Daria Pikulik; Nikol Płosaj; Justyna Kaczkowska; Wiktoria Pikulik | Poland | 4:24.361 | QB |
| 5 | 4 | Laurie Berthon; Pascale Jeuland; Victoire Berteau; Coralie Demay | France | 4:26.325 | |
| 6 | 1 | Lotte Kopecky; Gilke Croket; Shari Bossuyt; Annelies Dom | Belgium | 4:28.911 | |
| 7 | 1 | Evgenia Augustinas; Aleksandra Goncharova; Gulnaz Badykova; Anastasiia Iakovenko | Russia | 4:29.235 | |
| 8 | 2 | Hanna Solovey; Oksana Kliachina; Valeriya Kononenko; Anna Nahirna | Ukraine | 4:33.827 | |

- QG = qualified for gold medal final
- QB = qualified for bronze medal final

=== Finals ===
| Rank | Name | Nation | Time | Behind | Notes |
|---|---|---|---|---|---|
Gold medal final
| 1st place, gold medalist(s) | Katie Archibald; Laura Kenny; Elinor Barker; Neah Evans | Great Britain | 4:16.896 | | |
| 2nd place, silver medalist(s) | Letizia Paternoster; Silvia Valsecchi; Marta Cavalli; Elisa Balsamo | Italy | 4:25.384 | +8.488 | |
Bronze medal final
| 3rd place, bronze medalist(s) | Charlotte Becker; Gudrun Stock; Mieke Kröger; Lisa Brennauer | Germany | 4:23.105 | | |
| 4 | Nikol Płosaj; Justyna Kaczkowska; Daria Pikulik; Wiktoria Pikulik | Poland | 4:30.444 | +7.339 | |
