= Justin Wolf =

German cyclist

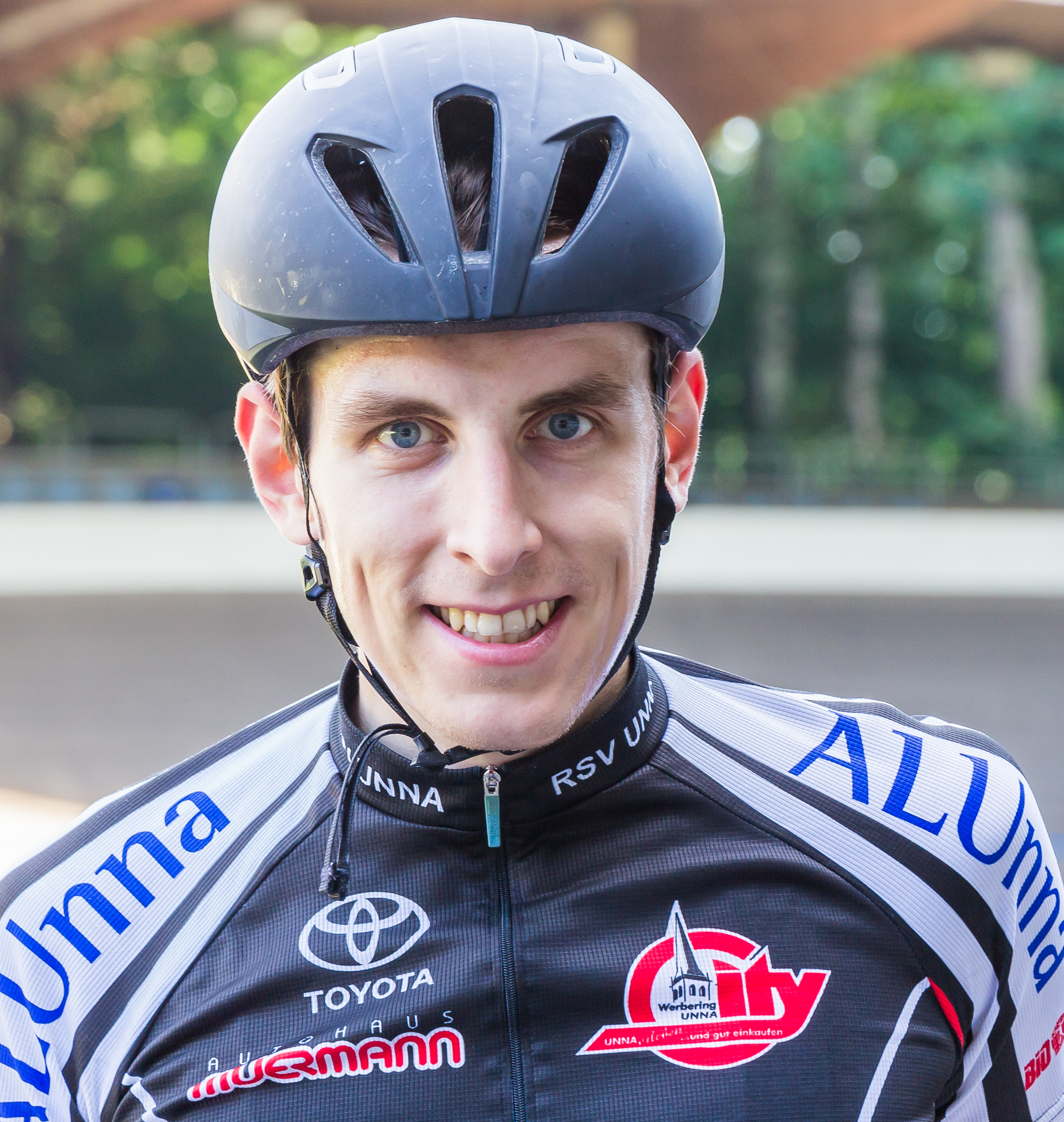
- Wolf in 2017

Personal information
- Full name: Justin Wolf
- Born: 15 October 1992 (age 34) Dortmund, Germany
- Height: 1.97 m (6 ft 6 in)
- Weight: 85 kg (187 lb)

Cycling career
- Sport: Cycling
- Disciplines: Road; Track
- Role: Rider
- Rider type: Time trialist

Amateur teams
- 2004–2007: RuMC "Sturm" Hombruch 1925
- 2008–2018: RSV Unna 1968
- 2009–2012: Red Bull Team NRW
- 2012: Bike Aid
- 2018: Sportforum Düsseldorf–Kaarst–Büttgen

Professional teams
- 2013: Quantec–Indeland
- 2014: Bike Aid–Ride for Help
- 2017: Dauner D&DQ–Akkon
- 2019–2021: Bike Aid
- 2022: Leopard Pro Cycling
Medal record
Road bicycle racing
Representing Germany
European Championships
Silver medal – second place	2019 Alkmaar	Mixed team relay
Silver medal – second place	2021 Trentino	Mixed team relay

Justin Wolf (born 15 October 1992) is a German professional road and track cyclist, who most recently rode for UCI Continental team Leopard Pro Cycling.

== Major results ==
2010
1st Team pursuit, Junior National Track Championships
2017
3rd Individual pursuit, National Track Championships
2019
2nd Team relay, UEC European Road Championships
2nd Chrono Champenois
5th Time trial, National Road Championships
8th Overall Tour of Mesopotamia
9th Chrono des Nations
2020
UEC European Road Championships

1st Team relay
7th Time trial

1st Prologue Tour of Romania
2021
1st Stage 1 Tour of Mevlana
1st Stage 6 Tour de Bretagne
2nd Team relay, UEC European Road Championships
2nd Overall Belgrade Banjaluka

1st Stage 1

6th Overall Tour of Romania
9th Chrono des Nations
2023
1st Stage 1 (ITT) Kreiz Breizh Elites
