= Corinna Lechner =

German cyclist

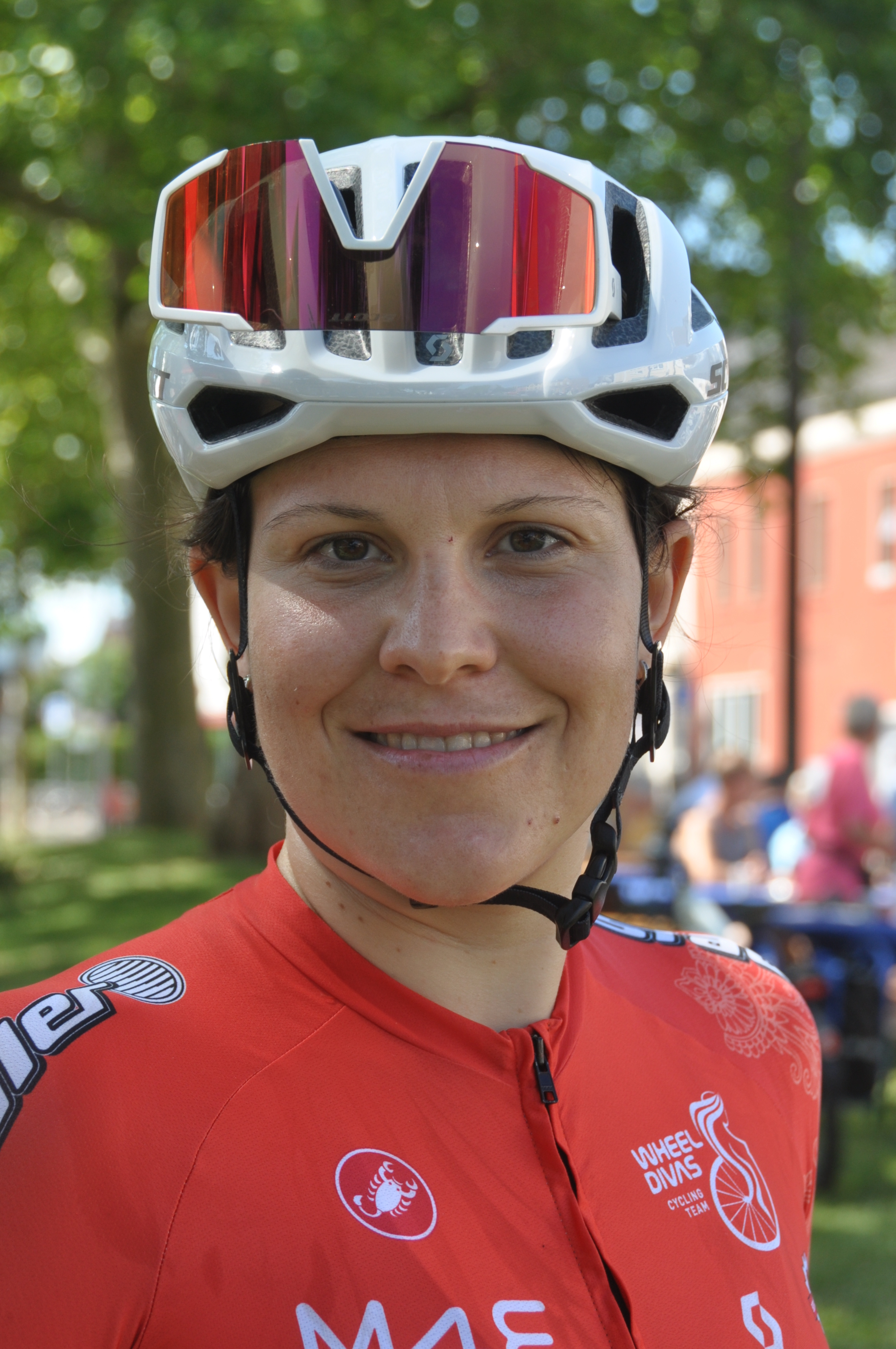
- Lechner in 2025

Personal information
- Full name: Corinna Lechner
- Born: 10 August 1994 (age 32) Fürstenfeldbruck, Germany

Cycling career
- Sport: Cycling
- Current team: MEXX–Watersley International
- Discipline: Road
- Role: Rider

Amateur teams
- 2008–2012: KSC Puch
- 2013–2014: SV Aufbau Altenburg
- 2013–2015: Maxx–Solar
- 2018–: MEXX–Watersley International

Professional team
- 2015–2018: BTC City Ljubljana
Medal record
Women's road cycling
Representing Germany
European Championships
Silver medal – second place	2021 Trentino	Mixed team relay
Women's para-cycling
Track World Championships
Silver medal – second place	2026 Apeldoorn	Mixed team sprint B

Corinna Lechner (born 10 August 1994) is a German racing cyclist, who currently rides for Dutch amateur team MEXX–Watersley International. She rode at the 2014 UCI Road World Championships.

== Major results ==
2021
2nd Mixed team relay, European Road Championships
