= 2023 UEC European Track Championships – Women's individual pursuit =

Women's individual pursuit at the 2023 UEC European Track Championships
- Venue: Tissot Velodrome, Grenchen
- Date: 11 February
- Competitors: 14 from 8 nations
- Winning time: 3:20.101

Medalists
gold medal	Franziska Brauße	Germany
silver medal	Josie Knight	Great Britain
bronze medal	Mieke Kröger	Germany

The women's individual pursuit competition at the 2023 UEC European Track Championships was held on 11 February 2023.

== Results ==
=== Qualifying ===
The first two racers raced for gold, the third and fourth fastest rider raced for the bronze medal.

Rank	Name	Nation	Time	Behind	Notes
1	Franziska Brauße	Germany	3:21.486		QG
2	Josie Knight	Great Britain	3:22.198	+0.712	QG
3	Anna Morris	Great Britain	3:22.856	+1.370	QB
4	Mieke Kröger	Germany	3:25.367	+3.881	QB
5	Vittoria Guazzini	Italy	3:25.454	+3.968	
6	Martina Alzini	Italy	3:28.327	+6.841	
7	Kelly Murphy	Ireland	3:28.632	+7.146	
8	Valentine Fortin	France	3:31.711	+10.225	
9	Olga Wankiewicz	Poland	3:35.082	+13.596	
10	Fabienne Buri	Switzerland	3:35.835	+14.349	
11	Isabel Ferreres	Spain	3:38.974	+17.488	
12	Patrycja Lorkowska	Poland	3:40.963	+19.477	
13	Elena Hartmann	Switzerland	3:41.185	+19.699	
14	Erin Creighton	Ireland	3:44.716	+23.230	

=== Finals ===
Rank	Name	Nation	Time	Behind	Notes
Gold medal final
1st place, gold medalist(s)	Franziska Brauße	Germany	3:20.101		
2nd place, silver medalist(s)	Josie Knight	Great Britain	3:23.613	+3.512	
Bronze medal final
3rd place, bronze medalist(s)	Mieke Kröger	Germany	3:24.895		
4	Anna Morris	Great Britain	3:25.556	+0.661	
