= 2024 UEC European Track Championships – Women's scratch =

Women's scratch at the 2024 UEC European Track Championships
- Venue: Omnisport Apeldoorn, Apeldoorn
- Date: 11 January
- Competitors: 19 from 19 nations

Medalists
gold medal	Clara Copponi	France
silver medal	Lani Wittevrongel	Belgium
bronze medal	Martina Fidanza	Italy

The women's scratch competition at the 2024 UEC European Track Championships was held on 11 January 2024.

== Results ==
The winner is the first rider to cross the line without a net lap loss.

Rank	Name	Nation	Laps down
1st place, gold medalist(s)	Clara Copponi	France	
2nd place, silver medalist(s)	Lani Wittevrongel	Belgium	
3rd place, bronze medalist(s)	Martina Fidanza	Italy	
4	Daria Pikulik	Poland	
5	Maria Martins	Portugal	
6	Olivija Baleišytė	Lithuania	
7	Lea Lin Teutenberg	Germany	
8	Anita Stenberg	Norway	
9	Petra Ševčíková	Czech Republic	
10	Mia Griffin	Ireland	
11	Laura Rodríguez	Spain	
12	Lisa van Belle	Netherlands	
13	Sophie Lewis	Great Britain	
14	Ellen Klinge	Denmark	
15	Cybèle Schneider	Switzerland	
16	Alžbeta Bačíková	Slovakia	
17	Argyro Milaki	Greece	
18	Leila Gschwentner	Austria	
19	Tetyana Klimchenko	Ukraine	
