= Mieke Kröger =

German racing cyclist

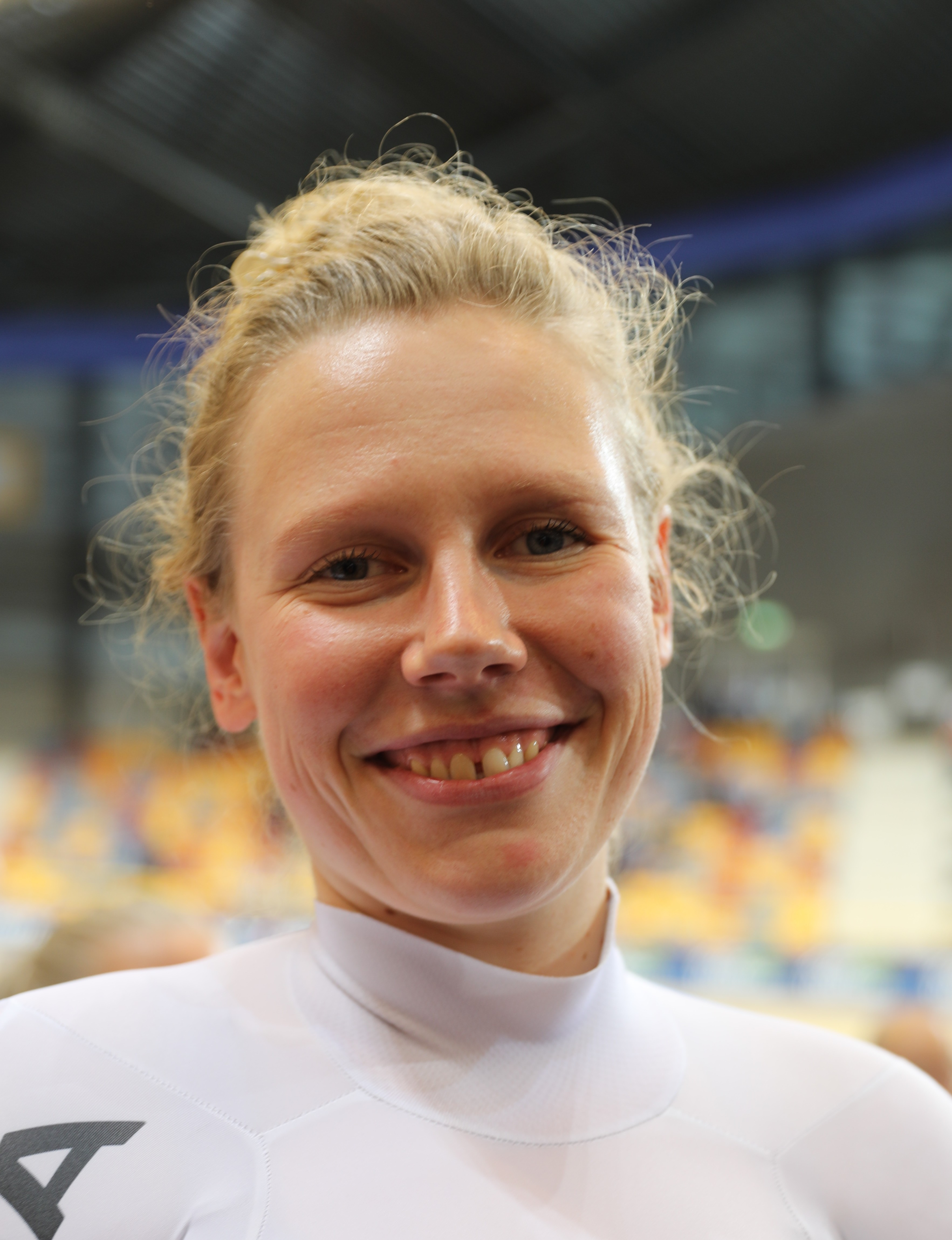
- Kröger at the 2019 UEC European Track Championships

Personal information
- Born: 18 July 1993 (age 33) Bielefeld, Germany
- Height: 1.83 m (6 ft 0 in)
- Weight: 80 kg (176 lb)

Cycling career
- Sport: Cycling
- Disciplines: Road; Track
- Role: Rider
- Rider type: Time trialist

Amateur team
- 2009–2012: RV Teutoburg Brackwede

Professional teams
- 2013–2014: Team Futurumshop.nl–Polaris
- 2015: Velocio–SRAM
- 2016–2017: Canyon//SRAM
- 2018–2019: Team Virtu Cycling
- 2020–2021: Hitec Products–Birk Sport
- 2022–2023: Human Powered Health

Major wins
- Track Olympic Games Team pursuit (2020) World Championships Team pursuit (2021)
Medal record
Representing Germany
Women's road bicycle racing
World Championships
Gold medal – first place	2021 Flanders	Mixed team relay
Silver medal – second place	2019 Yorkshire	Mixed team relay
European Championships
Gold medal – first place	2020 Plouay	Mixed team relay
Silver medal – second place	2019 Alkmaar	Mixed team relay
Silver medal – second place	2021 Trentino	Mixed team relay
Silver medal – second place	2024 Limburg	Mixed team relay
Bronze medal – third place	2023 Drenthe	Mixed team relay
Women's track cycling
Olympic Games
Gold medal – first place	2020 Tokyo	Team pursuit
World Championships
Gold medal – first place	2021 Roubaix	Team pursuit
Silver medal – second place	2024 Ballerup	Team pursuit
Silver medal – second place	2025 Santiago	Team pursuit
Bronze medal – third place	2021 Roubaix	Individual pursuit
Bronze medal – third place	2026 Shanghai	Team pursuit
European Championships
Gold medal – first place	2021 Grenchen	Team pursuit
Gold medal – first place	2022 Munich	Individual pursuit
Gold medal – first place	2022 Munich	Team pursuit
Silver medal – second place	2014 Baie-Mahault	Individual pursuit
Silver medal – second place	2019 Apeldoorn	Team pursuit
Silver medal – second place	2025 Heusden-Zolder	Team pursuit
Silver medal – second place	2026 Konya	Team pursuit
Bronze medal – third place	2018 Glasgow	Team pursuit
Bronze medal – third place	2021 Grenchen	Individual pursuit
Bronze medal – third place	2023 Grenchen	Individual pursuit
Bronze medal – third place	2023 Grenchen	Team pursuit
Bronze medal – third place	2024 Apeldoorn	Team pursuit
Bronze medal – third place	2025 Heusden-Zolder	Individual pursuit
Representing Velocio–SRAM
Women's road bicycle racing
World Championships
Gold medal – first place	2015 Richmond	Team time trial
Representing Canyon//SRAM
Women's road bicycle racing
World Championships
Silver medal – second place	2016 Doha	Team time trial

Mieke Kröger (born 18 July 1993) is a German track and road racing cyclist, who last rode for UCI Women's WorldTeam Human Powered Health.

== Career ==
After two years with the Futurumshop.nl–Zannata team, she rode for Velocio–SRAM on the road in 2015. In November 2015, she was announced as part of the Canyon//SRAM team's inaugural squad for the 2016 season. In October 2017, the-then Team Virtu Cycling announced that Kröger would join them for the 2018 season, with the aim of developing her ability in road races alongside her time trialling.

== Major results ==
=== Road ===
2010
National Junior Championships

1st Time trial
3rd Road race

2011
National Junior Championships

1st Road race
1st Time trial

3rd Time trial, UCI World Junior Championships
2012
2nd Time trial, UEC European Under-23 Championships
2013
5th Time trial, UEC European Under-23 Championships
2014
1st Time trial, UEC European Under-23 Championships
4th UCI Road World Championships – Women's time trial
2015
1st Team time trial, UCI World Championships
UEC European Under-23 Championships

1st Time trial
7th Road race

1st Time trial, National Championships
2016
1st Road race, National Championships
2nd Team time trial, UCI World Championships
2017
3rd Crescent Vårgårda UCI Women's WorldTour TTT
2019
1st Overall Belgium Tour

1st Stage 1

1st Stage 2 Healthy Ageing Tour
Gracia–Orlová

1st Stages 2a (ITT) & 4

2nd Team relay, UCI World Championships
UEC European Championships

2nd Team relay
6th Time trial

2nd Time trial, National Championships
2nd Chrono Champenois
4th Overall BeNe Ladies Tour
2020
1st Team relay, UEC European Championships
8th UCI Road World Championships – Women's time trial
10th Overall Challenge by La Vuelta
2021
1st Team relay, UCI World Championships
2nd Team relay, UEC European Championships
2nd Overall BeNe Ladies Tour
3rd Chrono des Nations
2022
10th Overall BeNe Ladies Tour
2023
1st Time trial, National Championships
3rd Team relay, UEC European Championships
2024
1st Time trial, National Championships

=== Track ===
2011
1st Individual pursuit, UCI World Junior Championships
1st Individual pursuit, National Junior Championships
2012
National Championships

1st Individual pursuit
2nd Team pursuit

2013
1st Omnium, National Championships
2014
1st Individual pursuit, UEC European Under-23 Championships
2nd Individual pursuit, UEC European Championships
2015
1st Individual pursuit, National Championships
UEC European Under-23 Championships

2nd Team pursuit
3rd Individual pursuit

2018
3rd Team pursuit, UEC European Championships
2019
2nd Team pursuit, UEC European Championships
UCI World Cup

2nd Team pursuit, Minsk
2nd Team pursuit, Glasgow

2021
1st Team pursuit, Olympic Games
UCI World Championships

1st Team pursuit
3rd Individual pursuit

UEC European Championships

1st Team pursuit
3rd Individual pursuit

2022
UEC European Championships

1st Individual pursuit
1st Team pursuit

UCI Nations Cup, Glasgow

1st Individual pursuit
1st Team pursuit

2025
2nd Team pursuit, UCI World Championships
