= Tanja Erath =

German cyclist (born 1989)

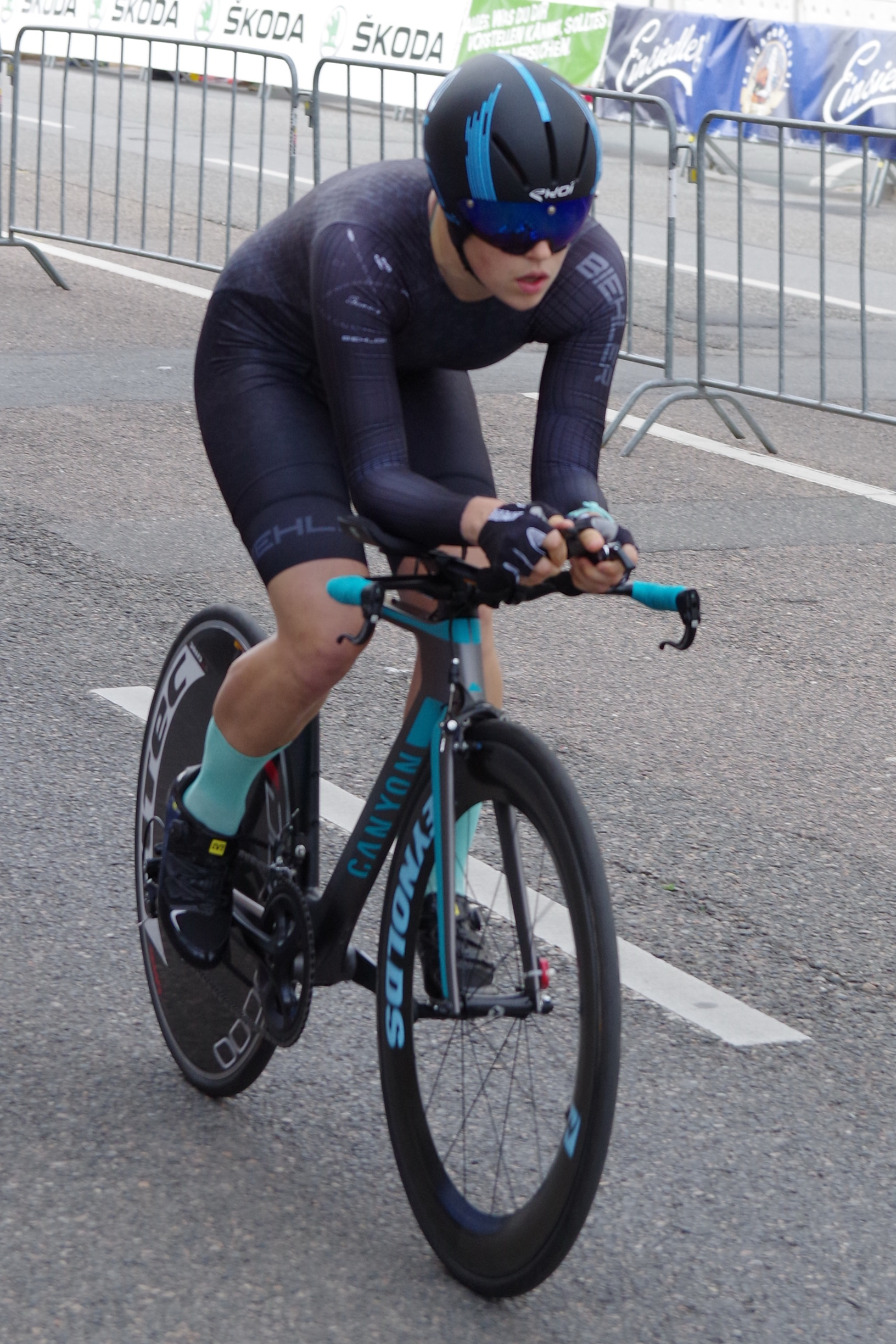
- Erath in 2017

Personal information
- Full name: Tanja Erath
- Born: 7 October 1989 (age 37) Heilbronn, Germany

Cycling career
- Sport: Cycling
- Current team: EF Education–Tibco–SVB
- Discipline: Road
- Role: Rider

Amateur team
- 2017: RSV Werl-Wickede

Professional teams
- 2018–2020: Canyon//SRAM
- 2021–2022: Tibco–Silicon Valley Bank
Medal record
Road cycling
Representing Germany
European Championships
Silver medal – second place	2021 Trentino	Mixed team relay

Tanja Erath (born 7 October 1989) is a German physician and former professional racing cyclist. During her professional cycling career, Erath rode for Canyon-SRAM and UCI Women's Continental Team EF Education–Tibco–SVB.

Erath began her professional cycling career after winning the Zwift Academy in 2017. After racing for Canyon-SRAM from 2018-2021, she moved to Team Tibco - Silicon Valley Bank. In 2021 she suffered a crash that caused multiple severe injuries that required spinal surgery. Erath announced her retirement from professional cycling on September 15, 2022.

== Major results ==
2018
2nd Scratch, National Track Championships
4th Open de Suède Vårgårda TTT
2019
1st Team pursuit, National Track Championships
1st Sprints classification Emakumeen Euskal Bira
5th Overall BeNe Ladies Tour
5th Time trial, National Road Championships
6th Tour of Guangxi
2020
3rd Road race, National Road Championships
3rd La Périgord Ladies
2021
2nd Mixed team relay, European Road Championships
