= Marion Borras =

French cyclist (born 1997)

Personal information
- Born: 24 November 1997 (age 28) Pontcharra, France

Cycling career
- Sport: Cycling
- Discipline: Track
- Role: Rider
Medal record
Representing France
Women's track cycling
World Championships
Silver medal – second place	2025 Santiago	Omnium
Silver medal – second place	2025 Santiago	Madison
Silver medal – second place	2026 Shanghai	Madison
Bronze medal – third place	2022 Saint-Quentin-en-Yvelines	Team pursuit
Bronze medal – third place	2023 Glasgow	Team pursuit
Bronze medal – third place	2024 Ballerup	Madison
European Championships
Gold medal – first place	2024 Apeldoorn	Madison
Silver medal – second place	2021 Grenchen	Individual pursuit
Silver medal – second place	2022 Munich	Madison
Silver medal – second place	2025 Heusden-Zolder	Points race
Bronze medal – third place	2021 Grenchen	Madison
Bronze medal – third place	2022 Munich	Team pursuit
Bronze medal – third place	2025 Heusden-Zolder	Madison
Women's road bicycle racing
European Championships
Gold medal – first place	2025 Guilherand-Granges	Mixed team relay

Marion Borras (born 24 November 1997) is a French professional racing cyclist. She rode in the women's team pursuit event at the 2017 UCI Track Cycling World Championships.

== Major results ==
=== Road ===
2014
1st Chrono des Nations Juniors
2015
1st Chrono des Nations Juniors
2019
2nd Time trial, National Under-23 Championships
2021
6th Chrono des Nations
2023
5th Time trial, National Championships
5th Paris–Roubaix
2024
3rd Time trial, National Championships
2025
1st Team relay, UEC European Championships
3rd Time trial, National Championships
2026
2nd Team relay, UCI Road World Championships

=== Track ===
2015
Belgian Xmas Meeting

1st Points race
2nd Individual pursuit
2nd Scratch

2016
Trofeu CAR Anadia Portugal

2nd Points race
2nd Scratch
2nd Individual pursuit

2nd Individual pursuit, Fenioux Piste International
2018
1st Scratch, International Belgian Track Meeting
2021
UEC European Championships

2nd Individual pursuit
3rd Madison (with Victoire Berteau)

2022
UEC European Championships

2nd Madison (with Clara Copponi)
3rd Team pursuit

3rd Team pursuit, UCI World Championships
2023
3rd Team pursuit, UCI World Championships
2024
1st Madison, UEC European Championships (with Valentine Fortin)
3rd Madison, UCI World Championships (with Victoire Berteau)
2025
UCI World Championships

2nd Madison (with Victoire Berteau)
2nd Omnium

UEC European Championships

2nd Points race
3rd Madison (with Victoire Berteau)
