= Lani Wittevrongel =

Belgian cyclist

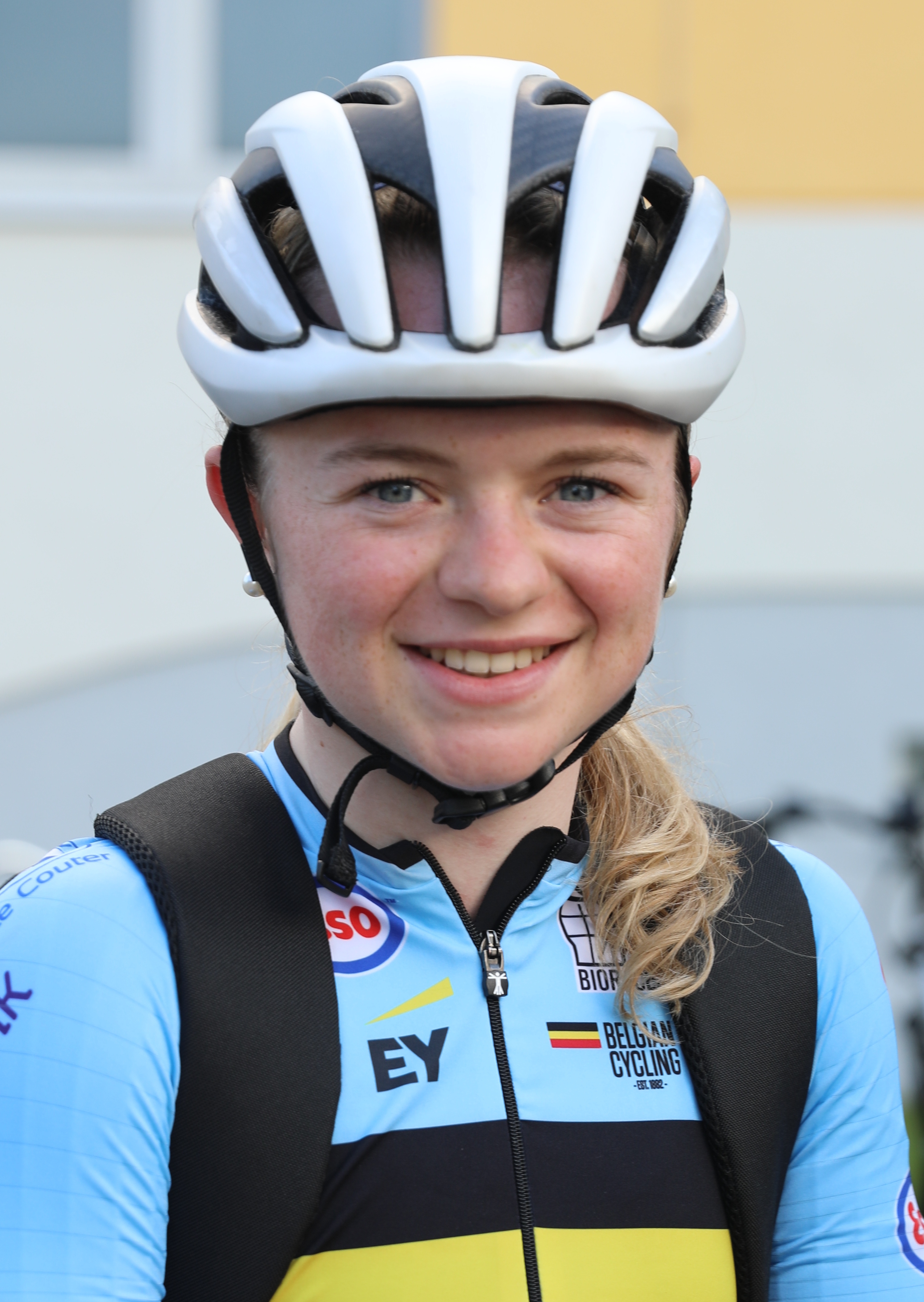
- Wittevrongel in 2024

Personal information
- Full name: Lani Wittevrongel
- Born: 12 July 2004 (age 22) Bruges, Belgium

Cycling career
- Sport: Cycling
- Current team: Lotto–Intermarché Ladies
- Disciplines: Track; Road
- Role: Rider
- Rider type: Sprinter

Professional teams
- 2023–2024: Duolar-Chevalmeire
- 2025–: Lotto Ladies
Medal record
Women's track cycling
Representing Belgium
European Championships
Silver medal – second place	2024 Apeldoorn	Scratch
European Under-23 Championships
Bronze medal – third place	2025 Anadia	Team pursuit
European Junior Championships
Gold medal – first place	2022 Anadia	Scratch

Lani Wittevrongel (born 12 July 2004) is a Belgian professional track and road cyclist. Most notably, she won a silver medal at the age of 19 in Women's Scratch at the 2024 UEC European Track Championships in Apeldoorn, The Netherlands having won already a gold medal in the same event at the 2022 UEC European Junior Championships in Anadia, Portugal.

== Major results ==
2022

1st Scratch, UEC European Junior Championships

2023
National Track Championships

1st Scratch
2nd Omnium
2nd Points race

2024
UEC European Championships

2nd Scratch
