= 2021 European Road Championships =

27th European Road Cycling Championships

- Location within Italy
- Venue: Trentino, Italy
- Date: 8–12 September 2021
- Coordinates: 46°26′44″N 11°10′23″E
- Nations participating: 39
- Cyclists participating: 1,042
- Events: 13

The 2021 European Road Cycling Championships was the 27th running of the European Road Cycling Championships, that took place from 8 to 12 September 2021 in Trentino, Italy. The event consisted of a total of 6 road races and 7 time trials.

== Location ==
On 10 June 2019 it was announced that, Trentino would host the event from 9 to 13 September 2020, however due to the effects of the COVID-19 pandemic, the event was postponed to 2021, and in its place the 2020 events were instead hosted by Plouay in France.

== Race schedule ==
All times are in CEST (UTC+2).

Date	Timings		Event	Distance
Time trial events
8 September	9:15	10:20	Junior women	22.4 km (13.9 mi) (2x laps for relay)
8 September	10:45	12:00	Junior men	22.4 km (13.9 mi) (2x laps for relay)
8 September	14:30	17:00	Mixed team relay	22.4 km (13.9 mi) (2x laps for relay)
9 September	9:15	10:15	Under-23 women	22.4 km (13.9 mi) (2x laps for relay)
9 September	10:45	11:45	Elite women	22.4 km (13.9 mi) (2x laps for relay)
9 September	14:15	15:35	Under-23 men	22.4 km (13.9 mi) (2x laps for relay)
9 September	16:00	17:35	Elite men	22.4 km (13.9 mi) (2x laps for relay)
Road race events
10 September	9:00	11:50	Junior men	107.2 km (66.6 mi)
10 September	13:50	16:00	Junior women	67.6 km (42.0 mi)
10 September	16:30	18:40	Under-23 women	80.8 km (50.2 mi)
11 September	9:00	12:10	Under-23 men	133.6 km (83.0 mi)
11 September	14:15	17:00	Elite women	107.2 km (66.6 mi)
12 September	12:30	17:00	Elite men	179.2 km (111.3 mi)

== Medal summary ==
=== Elite ===
Event	Gold		Silver		Bronze	
Men's Elite Events
Road race	Sonny Colbrelli; Italy	4:19:45	Remco Evenepoel; Belgium	4:19:45	Benoît Cosnefroy; France	4:21:15
Time trial	Stefan Küng; Switzerland	24:29.80	Filippo Ganna; Italy	24:37.50	Remco Evenepoel; Belgium	24:44.46
Women's Elite Events
Road race	Ellen van Dijk; Netherlands	2:50:35	Liane Lippert; Germany	2:51:53	Rasa Leleivytė; Lithuania	2:51:53
Time trial	Marlen Reusser; Switzerland	27:12.95	Ellen van Dijk; Netherlands	27:32.26	Lisa Brennauer; Germany	28:15.22

=== Under-23 ===
Event	Gold		Silver		Bronze	
Men's Under-23 Events
Road race	Thibau Nys; Belgium	3:06:57	Filippo Baroncini; Italy	3:06:57	Juan Ayuso Pesquera; Spain	3:06:57
Time trial	Johan Price-Pejtersen; Denmark	25:35.29	Søren Wærenskjold; Norway	26:08.98	Daan Hoole; Netherlands	26:09.76
Women's Under-23 Events
Road race	Silvia Zanardi; Italy	2:11:15	Kata Blanka Vas; Hungary	2:11:17	Évita Muzic; France	2:11:17
Time trial	Vittoria Guazzini; Italy	29:02.08	Hannah Ludwig; Germany	29:40.97	Elena Pirrone; Italy	29:47.92

=== Junior ===
Event	Gold		Silver		Bronze	
Men's Junior Events
Road race	Romain Grégoire; France	2:35:42	Per Strand Hagenes; Norway	2:35:42	Lenny Martinez; France	2:35:42
Time trial	Alec Segaert; Belgium	26:26.61	Cian Uijtdebroeks; Belgium	26:31.70	Eddy Le Huitouze; France	27:06.99
Women's Junior Events
Road race	Linda Riedmann; Germany	1:53:09	Eleonora Ciabocco; Italy	1:53:09	Eglantine Rayer; France	1:53:11
Time trial	Alena Ivanchenko; Russia	29:11.82	Antonia Niedermaier; Germany	29:43.61	Elise Uijen; Netherlands	30:05.35

=== Mixed team relay ===
Event	Gold		Silver		Bronze	
Time trial	Italy; Matteo Sobrero; Filippo Ganna; Alessandro De Marchi; Elena Cecchini; Marta Cavalli; Elisa Longo Borghini	51:59.01	Germany; Miguel Heidemann; Justin Wolf; Max Walscheid; Corinna Lechner; Mieke Kröger; Tanja Erath	52:20.08	Netherlands; Koen Bouwman; Jos van Emden; Bauke Mollema; Floortje Mackaij; Amy Pieters; Demi Vollering	52:25.28

== Medal table ==
* Host nation (Host nation (Italy))

Rank	Nation	Gold	Silver	Bronze	Total
1	Italy (ITA)*	4	3	1	8
2	Belgium (BEL)	2	2	1	5
3	Switzerland (SWI)	2	0	0	2
4	Germany (GER)	1	4	1	6
5	Netherlands (NED)	1	1	3	5
6	France (FRA)	1	0	5	6
7	Denmark (DEN)	1	0	0	1
7	Russia (RUS)	1	0	0	1
9	Norway (NOR)	0	2	0	2
10	Hungary (HUN)	0	1	0	1
11	Lithuania (LTU)	0	0	1	1
11	Spain (ESP)	0	0	1	1
Totals (12 entries)		13	13	13	39
