= Silvia Zanardi =

Italian cyclist

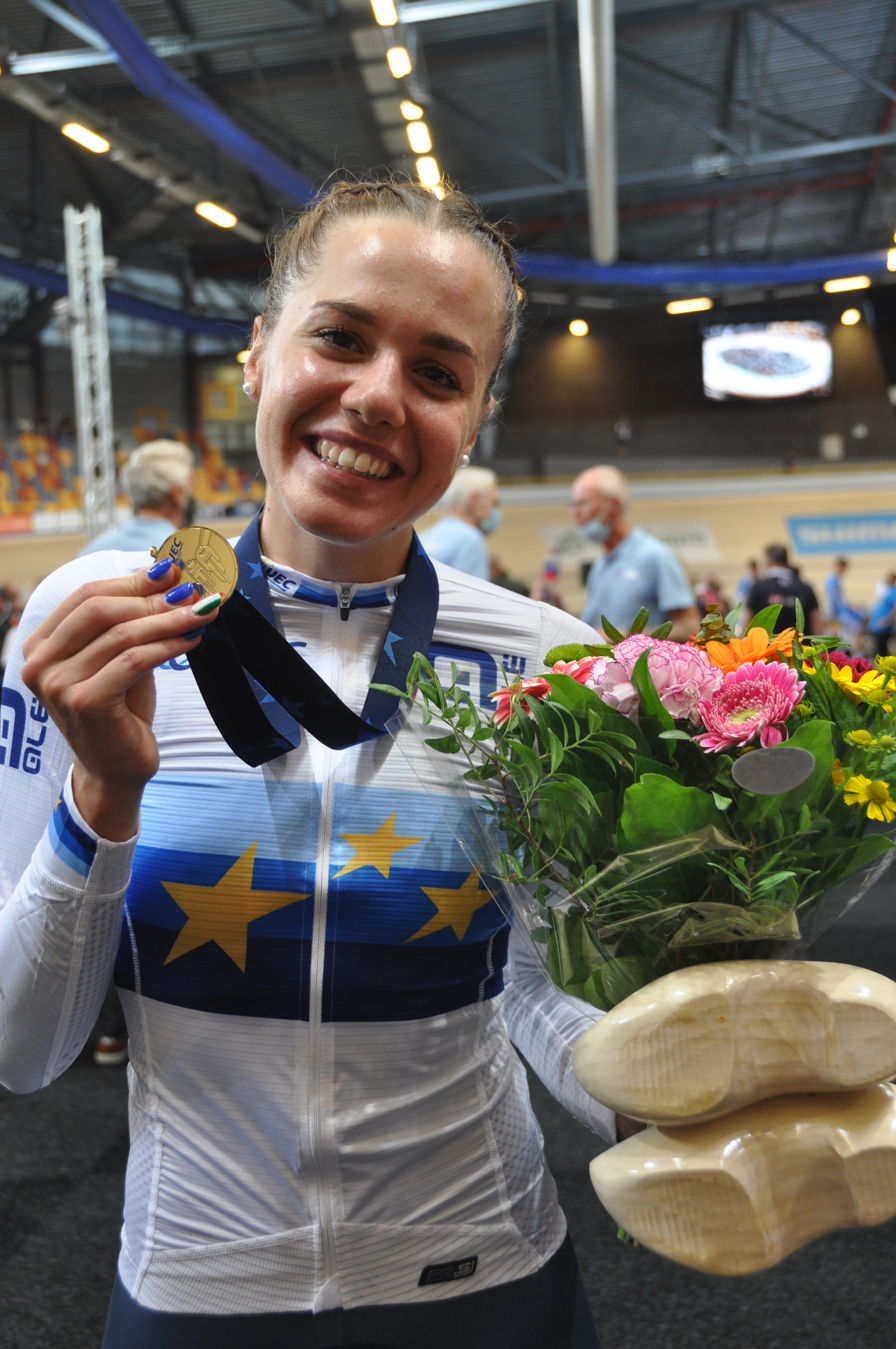
- Silvia Zanardi in 2021

Personal information
- Full name: Silvia Zanardi
- Born: 3 March 2000 (age 26) Fiorenzuola d'Arda, Italy
- Height: 1.65 m (5 ft 5 in)
- Weight: 56 kg (123 lb)

Cycling career
- Sport: Cycling
- Current team: Human Powered Health
- Disciplines: Road; Track
- Role: Rider

Professional teams
- 2019–2023: Bepink
- 2024–: Human Powered Health
Medal record
Women's track cycling
Representing Italy
European Championships
Gold medal – first place	2022 Munich	Madison
Silver medal – second place	2020 Plovdiv	Points race
Silver medal – second place	2021 Grenchen	Team pursuit
Silver medal – second place	2022 Munich	Points race
Silver medal – second place	2022 Munich	Team pursuit
Women's road cycling
European Championships
Gold medal – first place	2021 Trentino	Under-23 road race

Silvia Zanardi (born 3 March 2000) is an Italian professional racing cyclist, who currently rides for UCI Women's Team Human Powered Health.

== Major results ==
2018
4th Piccolo Trofeo Alfredo Binda
2020
4th La Périgord Ladies
5th Road race, National Road Championships
9th Vuelta CV Feminas
2021
1st Road race, UEC European Under-23 Road Championships
3rd Grand Prix du Morbihan Féminin
3rd La Choralis Fourmies Féminine
5th Giro dell'Emilia Internazionale Donne Elite
6th La Classique Morbihan
10th Kreiz Breizh Elites Dames
2022
1st Young rider classification, Setmana Valenciana-Volta Comunitat Valenciana Fémines
Tour Cycliste Féminin International de l'Ardèche

1st Points classification
1st Stage 6

1st Visegrad 4 Ladies Series - Hungary
1st Stage 3 Tour Féminin International des Pyrénées
3rd Trofeo Oro in Euro–Women's Bike Race
3rd Visegrad 4 Ladies Race Slovakia
4th Overall Internationale LOTTO Thüringen Ladies Tour
4th Road race, UEC European Under-23 Road Championships
5th Ronde de Mouscron
6th Memorial Monica Bandini
8th Overall Setmana Ciclista Valenciana

1st Young rider classification

10th Gran Premio della Liberazione
2023
1st Gran Premio della Liberazione
2nd Overall Giro Rosa Mediterraneo
6th Grand Prix Stuttgart & Region
7th Trofeo Oro in Euro
8th Kreiz Breizh Elites Dames
10th Overall Tour Cycliste Féminin International de l'Ardèche

1st Points classification
1st Sprints classification
1st Stage 4

10th Grand Prix Féminin de Chambéry
2024
1st La Choralis Fourmies
6th Tour of Guangxi
7th Grote Prijs Beerens
7th Overall Tour of Chongming Island
8th Konvert Koerse
2025
6th Ronde de Mouscron
8th Schwalbe Women's One Day Classic
8th Clásica de Almería
