= Hélène Hesters =

Belgian cyclist (born 2005)

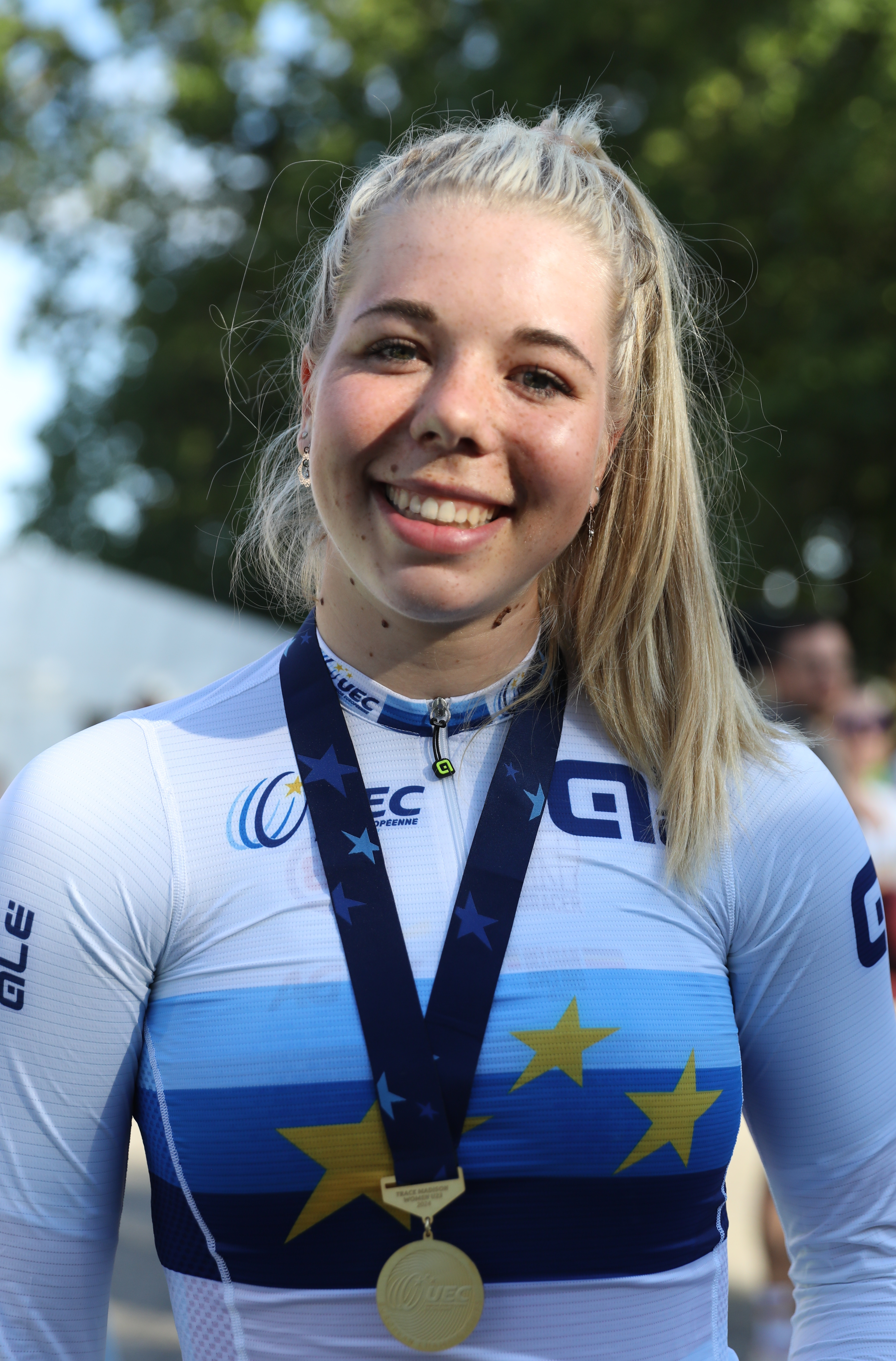
- Hesters in 2024

Personal information
- Born: 3 January 2005 (age 21) Ghent, Belgium

Cycling career
- Sport: Cycling
- Disciplines: Track; Road

Professional team
- 2024–: Liv AlUla Jayco Women's Continental Team
Medal record
Women's track cycling
Representing Belgium
World Championships
Bronze medal – third place	2025 Santiago	Elimination
European Championships
Gold medal – first place	2026 Konya	Scratch
Silver medal – second place	2025 Heusden-Zolder	Elimination
European U23 Championships
Gold medal – first place	2024 Cottbus	Madison
Bronze medal – third place	2025 Anadia	Team pursuit
Bronze medal – third place	2025 Anadia	Madison
European Junior Championships
Gold medal – first place	2023 Anadia	Omnium
Gold medal – first place	2023 Anadia	Elimination race
Silver medal – second place	2023 Anadia	Individual pursuit
Silver medal – second place	2023 Anadia	Madison
Bronze medal – third place	2022 Anadia	Points race
Bronze medal – third place	2022 Anadia	Madison

Hélène Hesters (born 3 January 2005) is a Belgian cyclist. She competed in the women's madison event at the 2024 Summer Olympics. She is the sister of cyclist Jules Hesters.

== Major results ==
=== Road ===
2022
1st Road race, National Junior Championships
2023
National Junior Championships

1st Road race
4th Time trial

=== Track ===
2025
2nd Elimination, UEC European Championships
3rd Elimination, UCI World Championships
2026
1st Scratch, UEC European Championships
