= Julie Norman Leth =

Danish cyclist (born 1992)

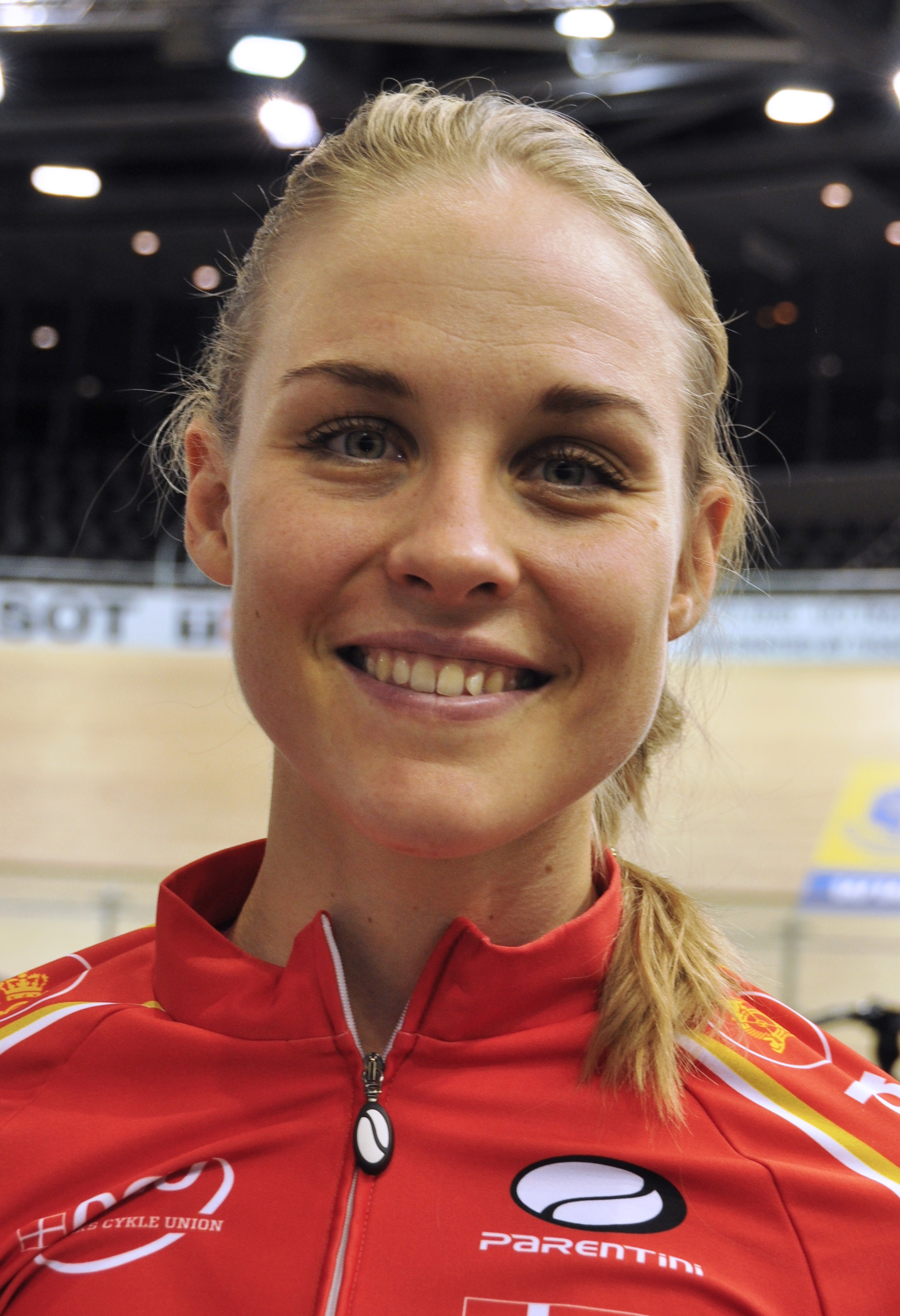
- Leth in 2018

Personal information
- Full name: Julie Norman Leth
- Born: 13 July 1992 (age 34) Aarhus, Denmark

Cycling career
- Sport: Cycling
- Current team: Uno-X Mobility
- Disciplines: Road; Track
- Role: Rider
- Rider type: Classics specialist

Amateur team
- 2013: Breast Cancer Care Cycling Team

Professional teams
- 2011–2012: Specialized DPD
- 2013–2016: Team Hitec Products
- 2017–2018: Wiggle High5
- 2019: Bigla Pro Cycling
- 2020–2021: Ceratizit–WNT Pro Cycling
- 2022–: Uno-X Pro Cycling Team

Major wins
- Road One-day races and Classics National Road Race Championships (2011) National Time Trial Championships (2014) Track World Championships Madison (2024) Points race (2024)
Medal record
Women's track cycling
Representing Denmark
Olympic Games
Silver medal – second place	2020 Tokyo	Madison
World Championships
Gold medal – first place	2024 Ballerup	Points race
Gold medal – first place	2024 Ballerup	Madison
Silver medal – second place	2022 Saint-Quentin-en-Yvelines	Points race
Bronze medal – third place	2019 Pruszków	Madison
Bronze medal – third place	2022 Saint-Quentin-en-Yvelines	Madison
European Championships
Gold medal – first place	2018 Glasgow	Madison
Gold medal – first place	2019 Apeldoorn	Madison
Silver medal – second place	2021 Grenchen	Madison
Bronze medal – third place	2022 Munich	Madison

Julie Norman Leth; né Leth; (born 13 July 1992) is a Danish racing cyclist, who currently rides for UCI Women's World Team Uno-X Mobility. She competed in the 2013 UCI women's road race in Florence. Leth joined the Wiggle High5 team in 2017. In December 2018, Bigla Pro Cycling announced that Leth would join them for the following season, after Wiggle High5 folded.

== Personal life ==
In October 2022, she married fellow cyclist Lasse Norman Hansen. Since then, both changed their surnames to Norman Leth.

== Major results ==
=== Road ===
2008
2nd Time trial, National Junior Championships
2009
1st Rund um Ascheffel
2nd Overall Tour de Himmelfart

1st Stages 1 & 4

2nd Overall Youth Tour
2nd Giro Nortorf
3rd Time trial, National Junior Championships
2010
1st Time trial, National Junior Championships
5th Road race, National Championships
2011 (1 pro win)
1st Road race, National Championships
2012
National Championships

3rd Road race
3rd Time trial

2013
1st GP Ballerup
3rd Time trial, National Championships
2014 (1)
National Championships

1st Time trial
3rd Road race

2018
7th Omloop van het Hageland
2019 (1)
1st GP Cham–Hagendorn
2020
2nd Road race, National Championships
2022
2nd Time trial, National Championships
10th Omloop Het Nieuwsblad
2023
8th Trofee Maarten Wynants
10th Classic Brugge–De Panne

=== Track ===
2007
1st Individual pursuit, National Junior Championships
3rd Individual pursuit, National Championships
2008
National Championships

1st Scratch
2nd Individual pursuit
2nd Sprint

2nd Individual pursuit, National Junior Championships
2009
National Championships

1st Scratch
1st Sprint
2nd Individual pursuit

1st Individual pursuit, National Junior Championships
2010
National Championships

1st Points race
1st Scratch
1st Sprint
2nd Omnium

1st Individual pursuit, National Junior Championships
2015
1st Madison, Melbourne Championships (with Annette Edmondson)
2017
National Championships

1st Points race
2nd Individual pursuit
3rd Scratch

2018
1st Madison, UEC European Championships (with Amalie Dideriksen)
1st Omnium, National Championships
UCI World Cup

1st Madison, Saint-Quentin-en-Yvelines (with Amalie Dideriksen)
2nd Madison, Milton (with Amalie Dideriksen)
2nd Madison, Berlin (with Amalie Dideriksen)

2019
1st Madison, UEC European Championships (with Amalie Dideriksen)
1st Omnium, National Championships
1st Madison, UCI World Cup, Hong Kong (with Trine Schmidt)
3rd Madison, UCI World Championships (with Amalie Dideriksen)
2020
National Championships

1st Omnium
1st Sprint

2021
2nd Madison, Olympic Games (with Amalie Dideriksen)
2nd Madison, UEC European Championships (with Amalie Dideriksen)
2022
3rd Madison, UEC European Championships (with Amalie Dideriksen)
3rd Madison, UCI Nations Cup, Glasgow (with Amalie Dideriksen)
2024
UCI World Championships

1st Madison (with Amalie Dideriksen)
1st Points race
