= Lisa van Belle =

Dutch racing cyclist (born 2004)

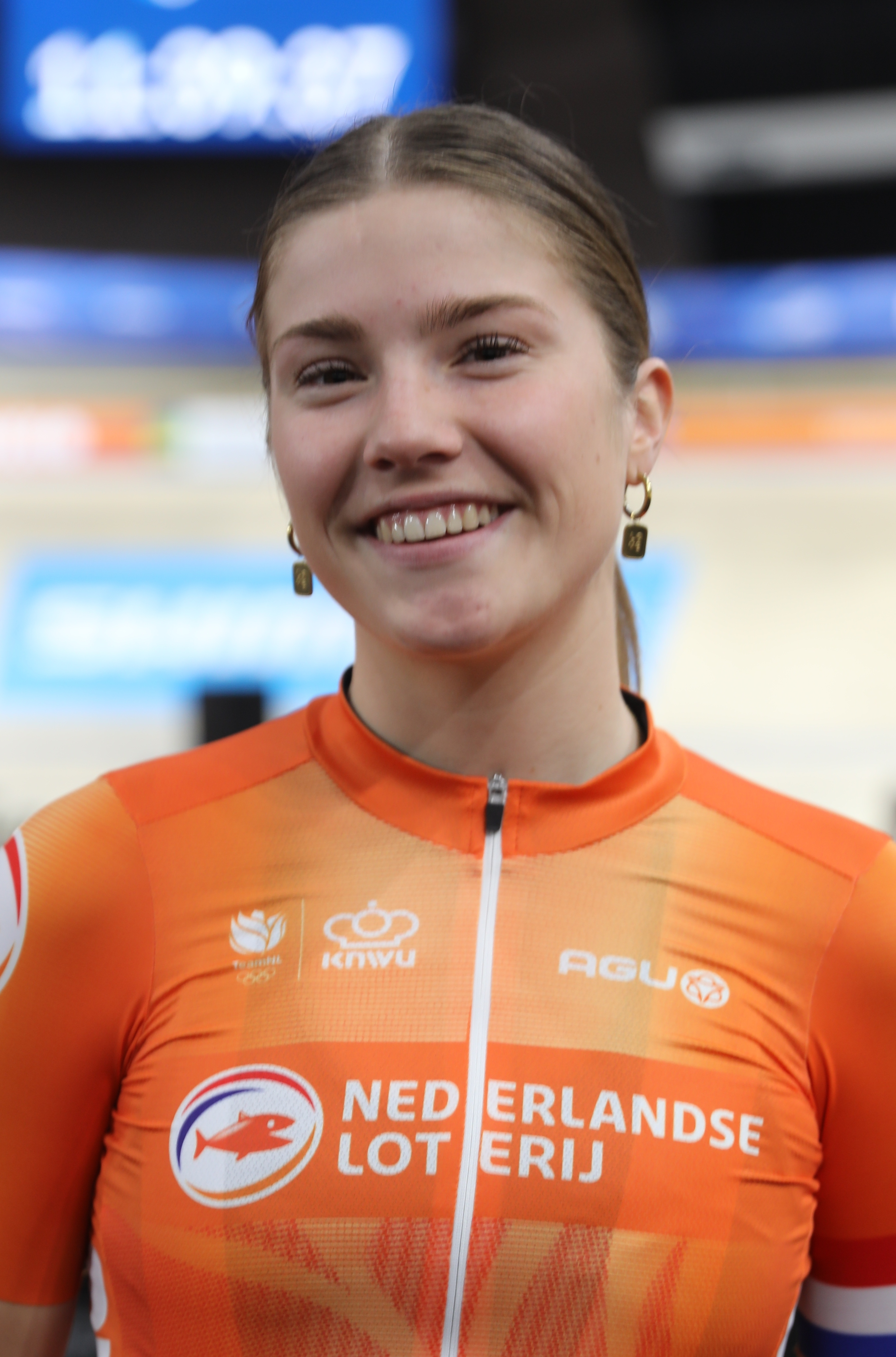
- van Belle in 2024

Personal information
- Born: 30 January 2004 (age 22) Zoetermeer, Netherlands

Cycling career
- Sport: Cycling
- Current team: Team SD Worx–Protime
- Disciplines: Road, Track
- Role: Rider
- Rider type: Sprinter

Professional teams
- 2023: WV Schijndel
- 2024: Proximus–Cyclis
- 2025: Velopro–Alphamotorhomes
- 2025–: Team SD Worx–Protime
Medal record
Women's track cycling
Representing the Netherlands
Olympic Games
Bronze medal – third place	2024 Paris	Madison
European Championships
Gold medal – first place	2025 Heusden-Zolder	Madison
Bronze medal – third place	2025 Heusden-Zolder	Elimination
European Under-23 Championships
Gold medal – first place	2025 Anadia	Omnium
Silver medal – second place	2025 Anadia	Madison
Bronze medal – third place	2025 Anadia	Individual pursuit

Lisa van Belle (born 30 January 2004) is a Dutch road and track cyclist, who currently rides for UCI Women's WorldTeam Team SD Worx–Protime. On the track, she was a bronze medalist at the 2024 Olympic Games and a gold medalist at the 2025 European Track Championships in the madison.

== Career ==
In July 2022, she was runner-up in the junior Dutch national road race. She rode for the club team WV Schijndel in 2023 and moved to the Belgian continental team Proximus-Cyclis CT for 2024.

Also a competitor in track cycling, she made her European Track Cycling Championships debut in Apeldoorn in 2024, with a twelfth place in the scratch race and a fifth-place finish in the madison with Marit Raaijmakers, for which she was an injury replacement for Maike van der Duin. She won the bronze medal at the 2024 Paris Olympics in the madison with Raaijmakers.

Van Belle won the gold medal in the madison at the 2025 UEC European Track Championships in Belgium, alongside Maike van der Duin. She also won the bronze medal at the championships in the elimination race. In March 2025, she won the silver medal in the elimination race at the 2025 UCI Track Cycling Nations Cup in Konya, Turkey, behind Yareli Acevedo of Mexico. In May 2025, she signed for UCI Women's WorldTeam Team SD Worx–Protime, making her debut at the 2025 La Vuelta Femenina.

Van Belle and Lorena Wiebes were leading the Madison race at the 2025 UCI Track Cycling World Championships in Santiago, Chile, in October 2025, until the pair crashed out, with Weibes initially clutching her shoulder. However, it was later confirmed that neither had suffered significant injury.

== Personal life ==
From Zoetermeer, she was a keen speed skater in her youth. Her brother Loe is also a professional cyclist, and rides for Visma–Lease a Bike. Another brother, Bas, was also a cyclist, prior to his death in 2024.
