= Neah Evans =

Scottish cyclist (born 1990)

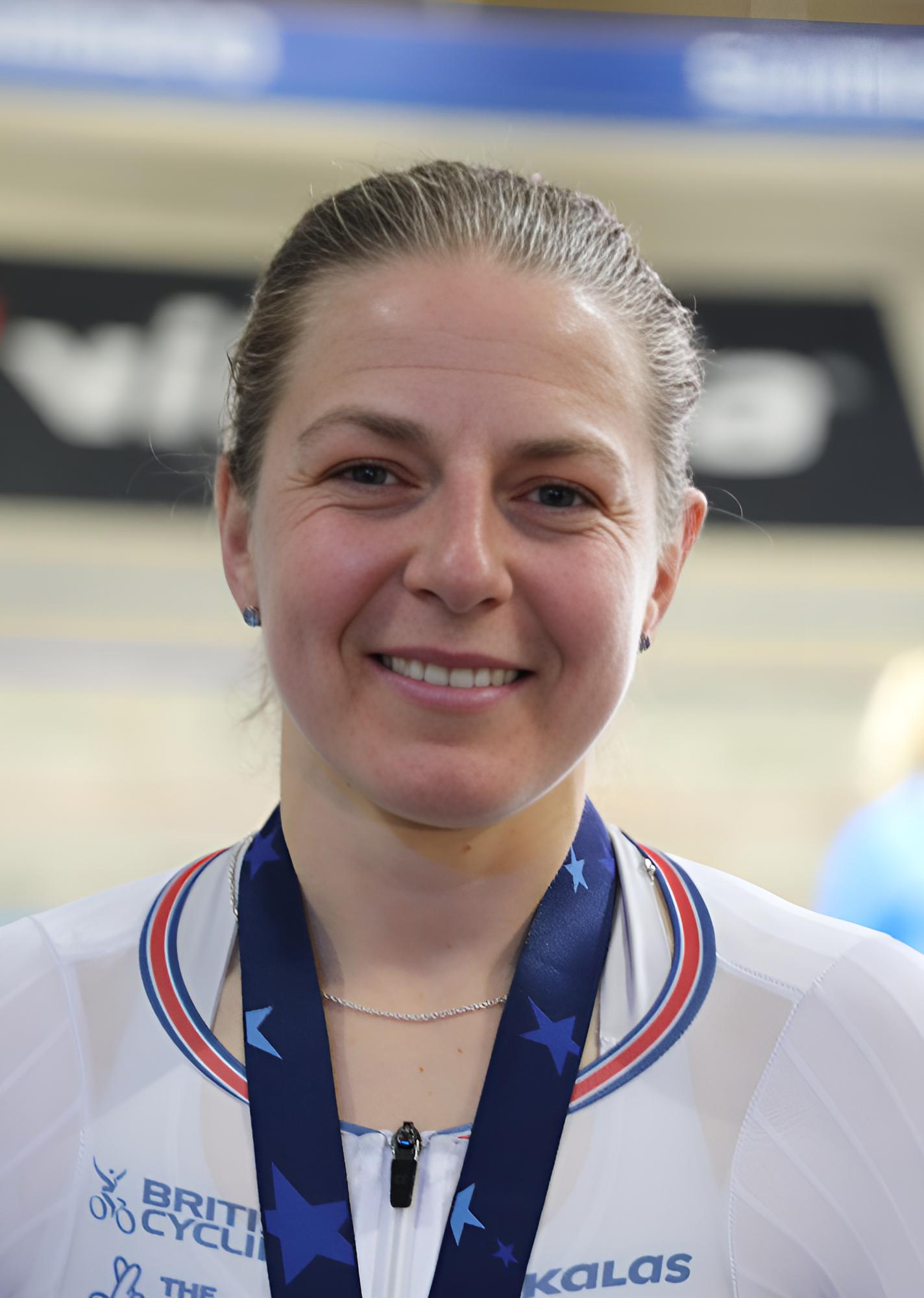
- Evans in 2024

Personal information
- Born: 1 August 1990 (age 36) Langbank, Scotland

Cycling career
- Sport: Cycling
- Current team: Handsling Alba Development Road Team
- Disciplines: Track; Road
- Role: Rider

Amateur teams
- 2017: Storey Racing
- 2019: Brother UK–Tifosi

Professional teams
- 2016: Podium Ambition Pro Cycling
- 2018: Storey Racing
- 2024: Torelli
- 2025–: Handsling Alba Development Road Team

Major wins
- Track World Championships Madison (2023) Points race (2022)
Medal record
Women's track cycling
Representing Great Britain
Olympic Games
Silver medal – second place	2020 Tokyo	Team pursuit
Silver medal – second place	2024 Paris	Madison
World Championships
Gold medal – first place	2022 Saint-Quentin-en-Yvelines	Points race
Gold medal – first place	2023 Glasgow	Madison
Silver medal – second place	2020 Berlin	Team pursuit
Silver medal – second place	2022 Saint-Quentin-en-Yvelines	Team pursuit
Bronze medal – third place	2021 Roubaix	Madison
Bronze medal – third place	2021 Roubaix	Team pursuit
Bronze medal – third place	2024 Ballerup	Madison
European Championships
Gold medal – first place	2018 Glasgow	Team pursuit
Gold medal – first place	2019 Apeldoorn	Team pursuit
Gold medal – first place	2020 Plovdiv	Individual pursuit
Gold medal – first place	2020 Plovdiv	Team pursuit
Gold medal – first place	2021 Grenchen	Madison
Gold medal – first place	2023 Grenchen	Team pursuit
Silver medal – second place	2024 Apeldoorn	Omnium
Silver medal – second place	2024 Apeldoorn	Team pursuit
Bronze medal – third place	2021 Grenchen	Elimination
Bronze medal – third place	2025 Heusden-Zolder	Team pursuit
Representing Scotland
Commonwealth Games
Silver medal – second place	2018 Gold Coast	Scratch
Silver medal – second place	2022 Birmingham	Points race
Bronze medal – third place	2018 Gold Coast	Points race
Bronze medal – third place	2022 Birmingham	Individual pursuit
Women's road bicycle racing
Representing Scotland
Commonwealth Games
Silver medal – second place	2022 Birmingham	Road race

Neah Alexina Evans (born 1 August 1990) is a Scottish professional racing cyclist specialising in track endurance events. Representing Great Britain at the Olympic Games, European Championships and World Championships, and Scotland at the Commonwealth Games, Evans is an Olympic medalist in the team pursuit, a World points race champion, a six-time European champion in team pursuit (4), individual pursuit and the madison, and a Commonwealth Games medalist.

In June 2021, Evans was selected as part of Team GB's cycling squad for the postponed 2020 Tokyo Olympics where she won a silver medal in the team pursuit event. In 2022, she won a gold medal in the points race at the Track Cycling World Championships.

Evans rode for Podium Ambition Pro Cycling.

== Biography ==
Evans was born in 1990. Her parents are Malcolm and Ros Evans. Her mother is an international orienteer and fell runner who competed in cross-country skiing at the 1984 Winter Olympics in Sarajevo. Neah Evans lives in Cuminestown near Turriff. She and her parents live in Aberdeenshire in north-east Scotland.

She worked as a veterinary surgeon before becoming a full-time athlete in 2017. Evans raced in every round of the Revolution series as she helped Podium Ambition win the overall Elite women's title. Evans notably placed her team first in round three despite being on her own; and beat Laura Kenny in the omnium event in London. At the London 6 days event, Evans won one of the ten races to finish second in the women's omnium to Katie Archibald. Evans was selected to represent Britain at the Cali World Cup event in 2017.

At the opening round of the 2017–18 World Cup track series, Evans won the scratch race only to be relegated to fourth after being deemed to have gained an advantage by going on to the track's blue strip (côte d'azur). Evans was part of the team pursuit that claimed the bronze medal in Pruszkow. She also won a solo bronze medal for Scotland in the points race at the 2018 Commonwealth Games.

Evans was chosen to be part of Team GB's cycling squad for the postponed 2020 Tokyo Olympics where she is joined by Katie Archibald, Elinor Barker, Laura Kenny and Josie Knight for the endurance races. The team won the silver medal in the women's team pursuit event.

At the 2022 British National Track Championships in Newport, Wales she won two British titles after winning the pursuit and points events. She subsequently won the British National Madison Championships with Laura Kenny in April.

At the 2022 Commonwealth Games in July, Evans won points race silver and individual pursuit bronze.

Evans won two more national titles at the 2023 British Cycling National Track Championships, bringing her total to 7, she won the individual pursuit for the second time and the points race for the third time.

== Personal life ==
Evans' boyfriend is the cyclist Jonathan Wale. One of her brothers, Donald Evans, won gold for Scotland at the 2014 Commonwealth Rowing Championships, bronze for GB at the World University Rowing Championships, and held an indoor rowing world record between 2016 and 2018.

== Major results ==
=== Track ===
2016
1st Derny, National Championships
2nd Omnium, Six Days of London
2017
UCI World Cup

1st Team pursuit, Manchester
3rd Team pursuit, Pruszków

1st Team pursuit, Grand Prix Poland
National Championships

2nd Scratch
3rd Individual pursuit
3rd Keirin
3rd Points race
3rd Team pursuit

2018
UCI World Cup

1st Team pursuit, London
2nd Madison, Saint-Quentin-en-Yvelines (with Emily Kay)
3rd Omnium, Saint-Quentin-en-Yvelines

1st Team pursuit, UEC European Championships
Commonwealth Games

2nd Scratch
3rd Points race

2019
1st Team pursuit, UCI World Cup, Glasgow
1st Team pursuit, UEC European Championships
National Championships

1st Points race
2nd Individual pursuit

2020
1st Madison, UCI World Cup, Milton (with Laura Kenny)
UEC European Championships

1st Individual pursuit
1st Team pursuit

2nd Team pursuit, UCI World Championships
2021
UEC European Championships

1st Madison (with Katie Archibald)
3rd Elimination

2nd Team pursuit, Olympic Games
UCI World Championships

3rd Team pursuit
3rd Madison (with Katie Archibald)

2022
UCI World Championships

1st Points race
2nd Team pursuit

National Championships

1st Individual pursuit
1st Points race
1st Madison (with Laura Kenny)
2nd Omnium
3rd Scratch

2nd Team pursuit, UCI Nations Cup, Glasgow
Commonwealth Games

2nd Points race
3rd Individual pursuit

2023
1st Madison, UCI World Championships (with Elinor Barker)
UCI Nations Cup

1st Team pursuit, Milton
2nd Madison, Milton (with Katie Archibald)
2nd Elimination race, Jakarta
3rd Omnium, Jakarta

1st Team pursuit, UEC European Championships
National Championships

1st Individual pursuit
1st Points race
2nd Scratch

9th Overall Endurance UCI Champions League

1st Scratch, London II

2024
1st Madison, UCI Nations Cup, Milton (with Katie Archibald)
2nd Madison, Olympic Games (with Elinor Barker)
UEC European Championships

2nd Team pursuit
2nd Omnium

3rd Madison, UCI World Championships (with Katie Archibald)
3rd Elimination race, UCI Champions League, Paris
2025
3rd Team pursuit, UEC European Championships

=== Road ===
2018
3rd Time trial, National Road Championships
Commonwealth Games

8th Time trial
8th Road race

2022
2nd Road race, Commonwealth Games

== See also ==
- List of 2016 UCI Women's Teams and riders
