= Lara Gillespie =

Irish cyclist (born 2001)

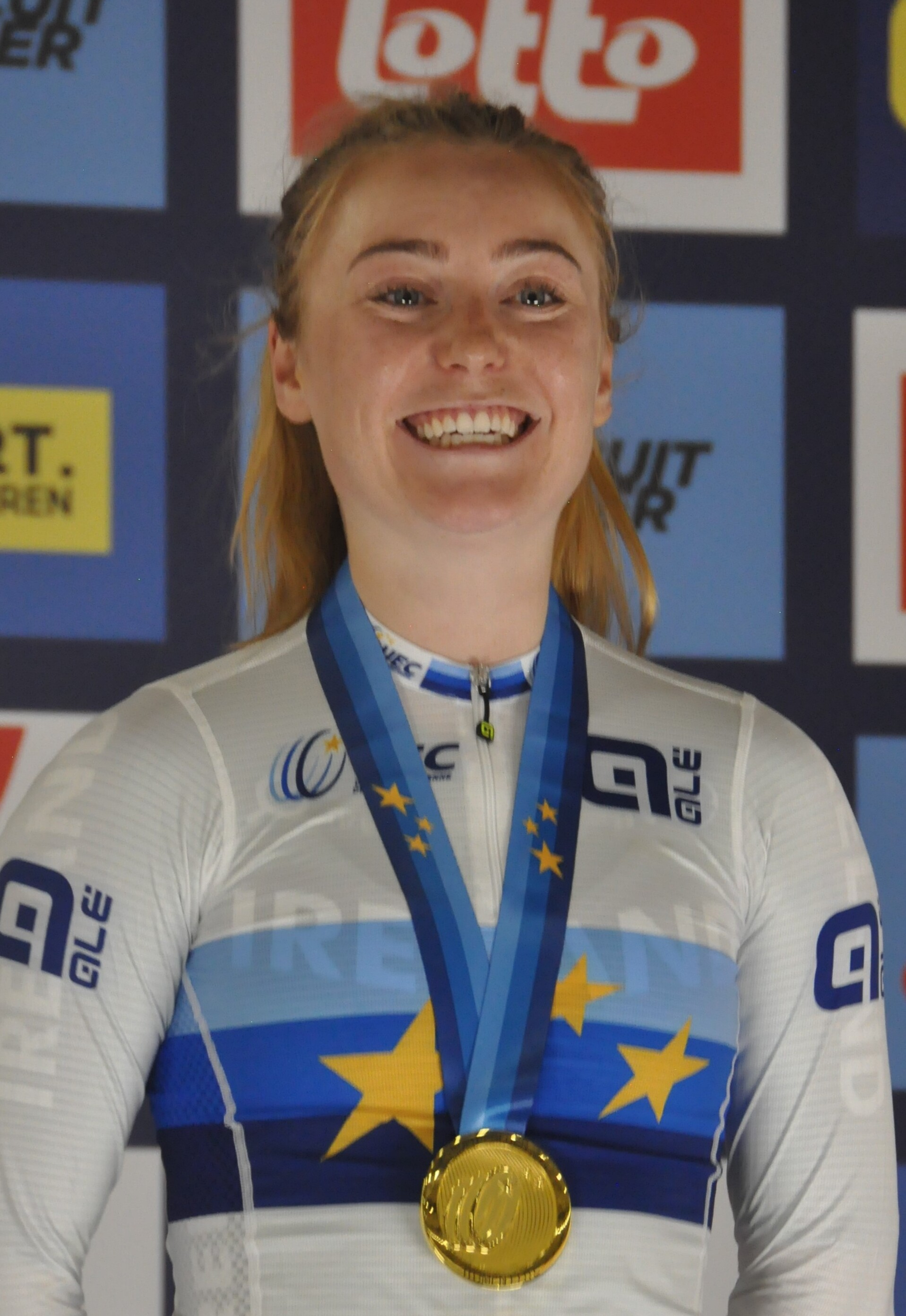
- Gillespie in 2025

Personal information
- Born: 21 April 2001 (age 25) Wicklow, Ireland

Cycling career
- Sport: Cycling
- Current team: UAE Team L'Imad
- Disciplines: Road; Track; Cyclo-cross
- Role: Rider

Amateur teams
- 2018: Cannibal Team
- 2019: Orwell Wheelers CC
- 2020: Illi-Bikes Cycling Team

Professional teams
- 2021: Team Rupelcleaning–Champion Lubricants
- 2023–2024: UAE Development Team
- 2024–: UAE Team ADQ

Major wins
- Road One-day races and Classics National Road Race Championships (2020, 2023) Le Samyn (2026) Track World Championships Elimination (2025) Points race (2026)
Medal record
Women's track cycling
Representing Ireland
World Championships
Gold medal – first place	2025 Santiago	Elimination race
Gold medal – first place	2026 Shanghai	Points race
Silver medal – second place	2026 Shanghai	Scratch
Bronze medal – third place	2024 Ballerup	Points race
European Championships
Gold medal – first place	2025 Heusden-Zolder	Elimination
European U23 Championships
Gold medal – first place	2023 Anadia	Points race
Gold medal – first place	2023 Anadia	Omnium
Silver medal – second place	2021 Apeldroon	Individual pursiut
European Junior Championships
Gold medal – first place	2018 Agile	Points race
Silver medal – second place	2018 Agile	Individual pursiut
Silver medal – second place	2019 Ghent	Individual pursiut
Silver medal – second place	2019 Ghent	Scratch
Silver medal – second place	2019 Ghent	Points race
World Junior Championships
Bronze medal – third place	2019 Frankfurt	Individual pursiut

Lara Gillespie (born 21 April 2001) is an Irish professional racing cyclist, who currently rides for UCI Women's WorldTeam UAE Team L'Imad. She won the gold medal in the elimination race at both the 2025 UEC European Track Championships, and the 2025 UCI Track Cycling World Championships in Santiago, Chile, becoming Ireland's first female world track cycling champion.

== Career ==
At the 2018 UEC European Junior Track Championships Gillespie won Gold in the Points race. At the 2019 UCI Junior Track Cycling World Championships, Gillespie won a bronze medal in the individual pursuit. She rode in the women's team pursuit event at the 2020 UCI Track Cycling World Championships in Berlin, Germany.

In 2023, she won gold medals for both the Points race and Omnium at the UEC European U23 Track Championships

Gillespie won her first senior medal after winning a bronze medal for Ireland at the 2024 World Track Championships in the Points Race

Lara Gillespie won the Elimination Race in round 4 of the 2024 UCI Track Champions League in London.

Gillespie is a multiple Irish National Champion on the Road, on the Track and for Cyclo Cross.

She competed for Ireland at the 2024 Summer Olympics in the women's team pursuit, omnium, and Madison events.

Gillespie won her first world title in the elimination race at the 2025 UCI Track Cycling World Championships. She beat Katie Archibald after all the other entrants had been eliminated from the race. She had also won the same event at the European Championships earlier that year. At the 2026 UCI Track Cycling World Championships in Shanghai, she won the points race, her second career world title.

== Major results ==
=== Cyclo-cross ===
2018
1st National Championships
2nd Belfast
2019
1st National Championships

=== Road ===
2018
1st Road race, National Junior Championships
2019
2nd Road race, National Junior Championships
2020 (1 pro win)
1st Road race, National Championships
2022
Rás na mBan

1st Stages 1 & 4

2023 (1)
1st Road race, National Championships
2nd Poreč Trophy Ladies
2nd Grand Prix Eco-Struct
6th ZLM Omloop der Kempen Ladies
2024 (4)
1st Overall Giro Mediterraneo Rosa

1st Stages 2 & 3

1st Antwerp Port Epic
4th Cyclis Classic
2025
2nd Omloop van het Hageland
3rd Le Samyn
3rd Nokere Koerse
5th Classic Brugge–De Panne
6th Gent–Wevelgem
2026
1st Le Samyn
2nd Omloop het Hageland
3rd Overall Tour de Pologne Women
6th Tour of Bruges Women
8th Paris–Roubaix

=== Track ===
2018
UEC European Junior Championships

1st Points race
2nd Individual pursuit

National Junior Championships

1st Time trial
1st Individual pursuit
1st Scratch
1st Sprint

2019
National Junior Championships

1st Individual pursuit
1st Scratch
1st Sprint
2nd Time trial

UEC European Junior Championships

2nd Points race
2nd Scratch
2nd Individual pursuit

3rd Individual pursuit, UCI Junior Track Cycling World Championships
2020
National Championships

1st Scratch
2nd Individual pursuit
3rd Sprint

2022
1st Scratch, National Championships
Dublin International

1st Scratch
1st Omnium

Troféu Internacional de Pista

1st Madison
1st Omnium

2023
UEC European Under-23 Championships

1st Points race
1st Omnium

Dublin International

1st Madison
1st Omnium

GP Presov

1st Madison
1st Omnium
1st Elimination

2025

UCI World Championships

1st Elimination
2026

UCI World Championships

1st Points
2nd Scratch
