= 2025 UCI Track Cycling season =

Nineteenth season of UCI Track Cycling Season

Details
- Dates: 3 January – December 2025

The 2025 UCI Track Cycling season is the 20th season of the UCI Track Cycling Season. The 2025 season began on 3 January with the French Championship and Bromont C2, a Canadian tournament and will end in December. It is organised by the Union Cycliste Internationale.

== Events ==
=== January ===
Event	Race	Winner	Second	Third	Ref
Bromont C2; Canada; 7–8 January 2025; C2
Bromont C2; Canada; 7–8 January 2025; C2	Elimination Race	(Canada) Michael Foley	(United States) Brendan Rhim	(Canada) Jonathan Hinse	
Bromont C2; Canada; 7–8 January 2025; C2	Elimination Race	(Canada) Ngaire Barraclough	(Canada) Vanessa Montrichard	(Canada) Anika Brants	
Bromont C2; Canada; 7–8 January 2025; C2	Keirin	(Canada) Ryan Dodyk	(Canada) Nick Wammes	(Canada) Michael Girolametto-Prosen	
Bromont C2; Canada; 7–8 January 2025; C2	Keirin	(Canada) Lauriane Genest	(United States) McKenna McKee	(Canada) Sarah Orban	
Bromont C2; Canada; 7–8 January 2025; C2	Scratch	(Canada) Michael Foley	(Canada) Carson Mattern	(United States) Otis Engel	
Bromont C2; Canada; 7–8 January 2025; C2	Scratch	(Canada) Justine Thomas	(Canada) Ngaire Barraclough	(Canada) Anabelle Thomas	
Bromont C2; Canada; 7–8 January 2025; C2	Sprint	(Canada) Nick Wammes	(Canada) Tyler Rorke	(Canada) Ryan Dodyk	
Bromont C2; Canada; 7–8 January 2025; C2	Sprint	(Canada) Sarah Orban	(United States) McKenna McKee	(Canada) Emy Savard	
Bromont C2; Canada; 7–8 January 2025; C2	Omnium	(Canada) Mathias Guillemette	(Canada) Michael Foley	(United States) Brendan Rhim	
Bromont C2; Canada; 7–8 January 2025; C2	Omnium	(Uzbekistan) Nafosat Kozieva	(Canada) Ngaire Barraclough	(Canada) Lily Plante	
Bromont C2; Canada; 7–8 January 2025; C2	Madison	(Canada) Mathias Guillemette (Canada) Chris Ernst	(United States) Brendan Rhim (United States) Eddy Huntsman	(Canada) Michael Foley (Canada) Zach Webster	
Bromont C2; Canada; 7–8 January 2025; C2	Madison	(Canada) Lily Plante (Canada) Ngaire Barraclough	(Uzbekistan) Nafosat Kozieva (Canada) Justine Thomas	(United States) Stephanie Lawrence (United States) Reagen Pattishall	
Six Days of Bremen; Germany; 10–13 January 2025; C2
Six Days of Bremen; Germany; 10–13 January 2025; C2	Madison	(Netherlands) Yoeri Havik (Germany) Nils Politt (Germany) Isabel Kämpfert (Germany) Franziska Brauße	(Germany) Theo Reinhardt (Germany) Roger Kluge (Germany) Fabienne Jährig (Germany) Marla Sigmund	(Italy) Simone Consonni (Italy) Elia Viviani (Norway) Nora Tveit (United Kingdom) Lucy Nelson	
Asian Track Series 1 Malaysia; 14–15 January 2025; CL1	Madison				
Asian Track Series 1 Malaysia; 14–15 January 2025; CL1	Elimination Race	(Indonesia) Terry Kusuma	(Malaysia) Muhammad Hafiq Mohd Jafri	(Malaysia) Yusri Shaari	
Asian Track Series 1 Malaysia; 14–15 January 2025; CL1	Elimination Race	(Singapore) Valencia Tan	(Malaysia) Nur Aisyah Mohamad Zubir	(Singapore) Elizabeth Liau	
Asian Track Series 1 Malaysia; 14–15 January 2025; CL1	Keirin	(South Korea) Kang Seo-jun	(Malaysia) Fadhil Zonis	(Malaysia) Mohd Akmal Nazimi Jusena	
Asian Track Series 1 Malaysia; 14–15 January 2025; CL1	Keirin	(Malaysia) Nurul Izzah Izzati Mohd Asri	(South Korea) Kim Ha-eun	(South Korea) Cho Sun-young	
Asian Track Series 1 Malaysia; 14–15 January 2025; CL1	Sprint	(Australia) Sam Gallagher	(South Korea) Bae Jun-hyeong	(Malaysia) Muhammad Ridwan Sahrom	
Asian Track Series 1 Malaysia; 14–15 January 2025; CL1	Sprint	(Malaysia) Nurul Izzah Izzati Mohd Asri	(South Korea) Kim Ha-eun	(Malaysia) Nur Alyssa Farid	
Asian Track Series 1 Malaysia; 14–15 January 2025; CL1	Omnium	(Indonesia) Bernard Van Aert	(Malaysia) New Joe Lau	(South Korea) Min Kyeong-ho	
Asian Track Series 1 Malaysia; 14–15 January 2025; CL1	Omnium	(Singapore) Valencia Tan	(South Korea) Shin Ji-eun	(Malaysia) Nur Aisyah Mohamad Zubir	
Asian Track Series 1 Malaysia; 14–15 January 2025; CL1	Scratch	(South Korea) Park Sang-hoon	(Indonesia) Bernard Van Aert	(Malaysia) Abdul Azim Aliyas	
Asian Track Series 1 Malaysia; 14–15 January 2025; CL1	Scratch	(Malaysia) Khairunnisa Aleeya Saifulnizam	(Singapore) Valencia Tan	(South Korea) Kim Min-jeong	
Asian Track Series 2 Malaysia; 18–19 January 2025; CL2
Asian Track Series 2 Malaysia; 18–19 January 2025; CL2	Sprint	(Malaysia) Muhammad Ridwan Sahrom	(Malaysia) Fadhil Zonis	(Australia) Sam Gallagher	
Asian Track Series 2 Malaysia; 18–19 January 2025; CL2	Sprint	(Malaysia) Nurul Izzah Izzati Mohd Asri	(South Korea) Kim Ha-eun	(South Korea) Cho Sun-young	
Asian Track Series 2 Malaysia; 18–19 January 2025; CL2	Omnium	(Indonesia) Bernard Van Aert	(Indonesia) Muhammad Andy Royan	(Malaysia) Muhammad Hafiq Mohd Jafri	
Asian Track Series 2 Malaysia; 18–19 January 2025; CL2	Omnium	(Singapore) Valencia Tan	(South Korea) Shin Ji-eun	(Singapore) Elizabeth Liau	
Asian Track Series 2 Malaysia; 18–19 January 2025; CL2	Points Race	(Indonesia) Terry Kusuma	(South Korea) Hong Seung-min	(Malaysia) Abdul Azim Aliyas	
Asian Track Series 2 Malaysia; 18–19 January 2025; CL2	Points Race	(Malaysia) Ci Hui Nyo	(Malaysia) Nur Aisyah Mohamad Zubir	(Singapore) Valencia Tan	
Asian Track Series 2 Malaysia; 18–19 January 2025; CL2	Scratch	(Indonesia) Bernard Van Aert	(Malaysia) Muhammad Hafiq Mohd Jafri	(Malaysia) New Joe Lau	
Asian Track Series 2 Malaysia; 18–19 January 2025; CL2	Scratch	(Singapore) Valencia Tan	(South Korea) Song Min-ji	(South Korea) Jang Su-ji	
Asian Track Series 2 Malaysia; 18–19 January 2025; CL2	Keirin	(Malaysia) Fadhil Zonis	(South Korea) Kang Seo-jun	(Australia) Sam Gallagher	
Asian Track Series 2 Malaysia; 18–19 January 2025; CL2	Keirin	(South Korea) Kim Ha-eun	(Malaysia) Nurul Izzah Izzati Mohd Asri	(Malaysia) Nur Alyssa Farid	
Asian Track Series 3 Malaysia; 22–23 January 2025; CL2
Asian Track Series 3 Malaysia; 22–23 January 2025; CL2	Elimination Race	(South Korea) Park Sang-hoon	(Indonesia) Bernard Van Aert	(South Korea) Hong Seung-min	
Asian Track Series 3 Malaysia; 22–23 January 2025; CL2	Elimination Race	(South Korea) Shin Ji-eun	(South Korea) Jang Su-ji	(Malaysia) Ci Hui Nyo	
Asian Track Series 3 Malaysia; 22–23 January 2025; CL2	Keirin	(Malaysia) Muhammad Ridwan Sahrom	(Malaysia) Fadhil Zonis	(South Korea) Kang Seo-jun	
Asian Track Series 3 Malaysia; 22–23 January 2025; CL2	Keirin	(Malaysia) Nurul Izzah Izzati Mohd Asri	(South Korea) Kim Ha-eun	(South Korea) Hwang Hyeon-seo	
Asian Track Series 3 Malaysia; 22–23 January 2025; CL2	Sprint	(Malaysia) Muhammad Ridwan Sahrom	(South Korea) Hong Seung-min	(Australia) Sam Gallagher	
Asian Track Series 3 Malaysia; 22–23 January 2025; CL2	Sprint	(Malaysia) Nurul Izzah Izzati Mohd Asri	(Malaysia) Nur Alyssa Farid	(South Korea) Kim Soo-hyun	
Asian Track Series 3 Malaysia; 22–23 January 2025; CL2	Madison	(Indonesia) Muhammad Andy Royan (Indonesia) Yosandy Darmawan Oetomo	(Indonesia) Bernard Van Aert (Indonesia) Terry Kusuma	(Malaysia) New Joe Lau (Malaysia) Muhammad Hafiq Mohd Jafri	
Asian Track Series 3 Malaysia; 22–23 January 2025; CL2	Madison	(South Korea) Shin Ji-eun (South Korea) Jang Su-ji	(South Korea) Song Min-ji (South Korea) Kim Min-jeong	(Singapore) Elizabeth Liau (Singapore) Valencia Tan	
Asian Track Series 3 Malaysia; 22–23 January 2025; CL2	Omnium	(Indonesia) Bernard Van Aert	(South Korea) Hong Seung-min	(South Korea) Kim Hyeon-seok	
Asian Track Series 3 Malaysia; 22–23 January 2025; CL2	Omnium	(Singapore) Valencia Tan	(South Korea) Shin Ji-eun	(Singapore) Elizabeth Liau	
CymruVelo Track Cup; United Kingdom; 22–23 January 2025; CL2
CymruVelo Track Cup; United Kingdom; 22–23 January 2025; CL2	Elimination Race	(United Kingdom) Rhys Britton	(United Kingdom) William Perrett	(United Kingdom) Ben Wiggins	
CymruVelo Track Cup; United Kingdom; 22–23 January 2025; CL2	Elimination Race	(United Kingdom) Anna Morris	(United Kingdom) Jenny Holl	(United Kingdom) Megan Barker	
CymruVelo Track Cup; United Kingdom; 22–23 January 2025; CL2	Keirin	(United Kingdom) Peter Mitchell	(United Kingdom) Marcus Hiley	(United Kingdom) Hayden Norris	
CymruVelo Track Cup; United Kingdom; 22–23 January 2025; CL2	Keirin	(United Kingdom) Rhian Edmunds	(United Kingdom) Lowri Thomas	(United Kingdom) Georgette Rand	
CymruVelo Track Cup; United Kingdom; 22–23 January 2025; CL2	Sprint	(United Kingdom) Peter Mitchell	(United Kingdom) Oliver Aloul	(United Kingdom) Lyall Craig	
CymruVelo Track Cup; United Kingdom; 22–23 January 2025; CL2	Sprint	(United Kingdom) Rhian Edmunds	(United Kingdom) Iona Moir	(United Kingdom) Lauren Bell	
CymruVelo Track Cup; United Kingdom; 22–23 January 2025; CL2	Team Sprint	(United Kingdom) Oliver Aloul (United Kingdom) James Brightwell (United Kingdom) Peter Mitchell	(United Kingdom) Lyall Craig (United Kingdom) Anthony Young (United Kingdom) Niall Monks	(United Kingdom) Harvey McNaughton (United Kingdom) Steffan Lloyd (United Kingdom) Jonah Jenkins	
CymruVelo Track Cup; United Kingdom; 22–23 January 2025; CL2	Team Sprint	(United Kingdom) Rhianna Parris-Smith (United Kingdom) Lauren Bell (United Kingdom) Rhian Edmunds	(United Kingdom) Lowri Thomas (United Kingdom) Iona Moir (United Kingdom) Georgette Rand	(United Kingdom) Kathryn Hinton (Spain) Aixa Catalan Tola (Spain) Helena Casas	
CymruVelo Track Cup; United Kingdom; 22–23 January 2025; CL2	Points Race	(United Kingdom) Ben Wiggins	(United Kingdom) William Roberts	(United Kingdom) William Perrett	
CymruVelo Track Cup; United Kingdom; 22–23 January 2025; CL2	Points Race	(United Kingdom) Anna Morris	(United Kingdom) Jenny Holl	(United Kingdom) Maddie Leech	
CymruVelo Track Cup; United Kingdom; 22–23 January 2025; CL2	Omnium	(United Kingdom) William Roberts	(United Kingdom) Rhys Britton	(United Kingdom) Ben Marsh	
CymruVelo Track Cup; United Kingdom; 22–23 January 2025; CL2	Omnium	(United Kingdom) Anna Morris	(United Kingdom) Jenny Holl	(United Kingdom) Maddie Leech	
Troféu Internacional de Pista Artur Lopes; Portugal; 25–26 January 2025; CL1
Troféu Internacional de Pista Artur Lopes; Portugal; 25–26 January 2025; CL1	Men's Madison	(Portugal) Carlos Salgueiro (Portugal) Iúri Leitão	(United States) Daniel Summerhill (United States) Brendan Rhim	(Portugal) Daniel Dias (Portugal) João Martins	
Troféu Internacional de Pista Artur Lopes; Portugal; 25–26 January 2025; CL1	Omnium	(Portugal) Iúri Leitão	(Portugal) Diogo Narciso	(United States) Brendan Rhim	
Troféu Internacional de Pista Artur Lopes; Portugal; 25–26 January 2025; CL1	Omnium	(Poland) Olga Wankiewicz	(Poland) Maja Tracka	(Poland) Nikol Płosaj	
Troféu Internacional de Pista Artur Lopes; Portugal; 25–26 January 2025; CL1	Points Race	(Portugal) Iúri Leitão	(Portugal) Diogo Narciso	(United States) Brendan Rhim	
Troféu Internacional de Pista Artur Lopes; Portugal; 25–26 January 2025; CL1	Points Race	(Spain) Eukene Larrarte	(Poland) Olga Wankiewicz	(Poland) Nikol Płosaj	
Troféu Internacional de Pista Artur Lopes; Portugal; 25–26 January 2025; CL1	Women's Scratch	(Poland) Nikol Płosaj	(Poland) Maja Tracka	(Poland) Eliza Rabażyńska	
Troféu Internacional de Pista Artur Lopes; Portugal; 25–26 January 2025; CL1	Men's Sprint	(Israel) Mikhail Iakovlev	(Italy) Stefano Moro	(Lithuania) Laurynas Vinskas	
Troféu Internacional de Pista Artur Lopes; Portugal; 25–26 January 2025; CL1	Men's Keirin	(Lithuania) Laurynas Vinskas	(United Kingdom) Harry Ledingham-Horn	(Italy) Stefano Moro	
Life's an Omnium Reversed; Switzerland; 30 January 2025; CL2
Life's an Omnium Reversed; Switzerland; 30 January 2025; CL2	Women's Elimination Race	(Italy) Martina Fidanza	(Italy) Martina Alzini	(Italy) Anita Baima	
Life's an Omnium Reversed; Switzerland; 30 January 2025; CL2	Men's Omnium	(Italy) Francesco Lamon	(Italy) Juan David Sierra	(Switzerland) Noah Bögli	
Life's an Omnium Reversed; Switzerland; 30 January 2025; CL2	Women's Points Race	(Italy) Martina Alzini	(Italy) Martina Fidanza	(Switzerland) Michelle Andres	
Life's an Omnium Reversed; Switzerland; 30 January 2025; CL2	Women's Scratch	(Italy) Martina Fidanza	(Italy) Anita Baima	(Italy) Martina Alzini	
Six Day Weekend; Germany; 31 January – 21 February 2025; CL2
Six Day Weekend; Germany; 31 January – 21 February 2025; CL2	Sprint	(Poland) Mateusz Rudyk	(Germany) Maximilian Dörnbach	(Germany) Robert Förstemann	
Six Day Weekend; Germany; 31 January – 21 February 2025; CL2	Sprint	(Germany) Lea Friedrich	(Germany) Emma Hinze	(Germany) Pauline Grabosch	
Six Day Weekend; Germany; 31 January – 21 February 2025; CL2	Men's Madison	(Germany) Roger Kluge (Germany) Theo Reinhardt	(Netherlands) Philip Heijnen (Netherlands) Yoeri Havik	(Italy) Elia Viviani (Italy) Michele Scartezzini	

=== February ===
Event	Race	Winner	Second	Third	Ref
2025 Oceania Track Championships; Australia; 11–15 February 2025; CC
2025 Oceania Track Championships; Australia; 11–15 February 2025; CC	Elimination Race	(Australia) Blake Agnoletto	(New Zealand) Marshall Erwood	(New Zealand) Keegan Hornblow	
2025 Oceania Track Championships; Australia; 11–15 February 2025; CC	Elimination Race	(New Zealand) Samantha Donnelly	(New Zealand) Bryony Botha	(Australia) Alli Anderson	
2025 Oceania Track Championships; Australia; 11–15 February 2025; CC	Individual Pursuit	(New Zealand) Tom Sexton	(New Zealand) Keegan Hornblow	(Australia) James Moriarty	
2025 Oceania Track Championships; Australia; 11–15 February 2025; CC	Individual Pursuit	(New Zealand) Bryony Botha	(New Zealand) Emily Shearman	(Australia) Maeve Plouffe	
2025 Oceania Track Championships; Australia; 11–15 February 2025; CC	Keirin	(New Zealand) Sam Dakin	(Australia) Byron Davies	(Australia) Daniel Barber	
2025 Oceania Track Championships; Australia; 11–15 February 2025; CC	Keirin	(New Zealand) Ellesse Andrews	(New Zealand) Olivia King	(New Zealand) Shaane Fulton	
2025 Oceania Track Championships; Australia; 11–15 February 2025; CC	Omnium	(New Zealand) Campbell Stewart	(New Zealand) Tom Sexton	(Australia) Oliver Bleddyn	
2025 Oceania Track Championships; Australia; 11–15 February 2025; CC	Omnium	(New Zealand) Emily Shearman	(New Zealand) Bryony Botha	(Australia) Maeve Plouffe	
2025 Oceania Track Championships; Australia; 11–15 February 2025; CC	Points Race	(New Zealand) Tom Sexton	(Australia) Oliver Bleddyn	(New Zealand) Keegan Hornblow	
2025 Oceania Track Championships; Australia; 11–15 February 2025; CC	Points Race	(New Zealand) Rylee McMullen	(New Zealand) Bryony Botha	(New Zealand) Samantha Donnelly	
2025 Oceania Track Championships; Australia; 11–15 February 2025; CC	Scratch	(New Zealand) Keegan Hornblow	(New Zealand) Campbell Stewart	(New Zealand) Nick Kergozou	
2025 Oceania Track Championships; Australia; 11–15 February 2025; CC	Scratch	(New Zealand) McKenzie Milne	(New Zealand) Lucy Reeve	(New Zealand) Samantha Donnelly	
2025 Oceania Track Championships; Australia; 11–15 February 2025; CC	Sprint	(Australia) Leigh Hoffman	(Australia) Daniel Barber	(Australia) Thomas Cornish	
2025 Oceania Track Championships; Australia; 11–15 February 2025; CC	Sprint	(New Zealand) Ellesse Andrews	(Australia) Alessia McCaig	(New Zealand) Shaane Fulton	
2025 Oceania Track Championships; Australia; 11–15 February 2025; CC	Time Trial	(Australia) Thomas Cornish	(Australia) Tayte Ryan	(Australia) Byron Davies	
2025 Oceania Track Championships; Australia; 11–15 February 2025; CC	Time Trial	(New Zealand) Ellesse Andrews	(New Zealand) Shaane Fulton	(Australia) Claudia Marcks	
2025 Oceania Track Championships; Australia; 11–15 February 2025; CC	Madison	(New Zealand) Tom Sexton (New Zealand) Campbell Stewart	(Australia) Oliver Bleddyn (Australia) Blake Agnoletto	(Australia) Liam Walsh (Australia) Declan Trezise	
2025 Oceania Track Championships; Australia; 11–15 February 2025; CC	Madison	(New Zealand) Bryony Botha (New Zealand) Samantha Donnelly	(New Zealand) Rylee McMullen (New Zealand) Emily Shearman	(Australia) Sophie Edwards (Australia) Alli Anderson	
2025 Oceania Track Championships; Australia; 11–15 February 2025; CC	Team Sprint	Australia (AUS) A Ryan Elliott; Thomas Cornish; Daniel Barber; Leigh Hoffman (R)	New Zealand (NZL); Jaxson Russell; Kaio Lart; Luke Blackwood; Louis Vuleta (R)	Australia (AUS) B Tayte Ryan; Maxwell Liebeknecht; Byron Davies	
2025 Oceania Track Championships; Australia; 11–15 February 2025; CC	Team Sprint	New Zealand (NZL); Olivia King; Shaane Fulton; Ellesse Andrews	Australia (AUS) A Kristine Bayley; Alessia McCaig; Sophie Watts	Australia (AUS) C Kalinda Robinson; Emma Stevens; Lauren Perry	
2025 Oceania Track Championships; Australia; 11–15 February 2025; CC	Team Pursuit	Australia (AUS) A Cameron Scott; Declan Trezise; Liam Walsh; Oscar Gallagher	New Zealand (NZL) A Kyle Aitken; Ben Oliver; Marshall Erwood; Mitchel Fitzsimons; Tom Sexton (R)	New Zealand (NZL) B Magnus Jamieson; Lucas Bhimy; Daniel Morton; Keegan Hornblow; Campbell Stewart (R)	
2025 Oceania Track Championships; Australia; 11–15 February 2025; CC	Team Pursuit	New Zealand (NZL) A Emily Shearman; Samantha Donnelly; Prudence Fowler; Rylee McMullen; Bryony Botha (R)	Australia (AUS) A Claudia Marcks; Nicole Duncan; Alli Anderson; Sally Carter; Keira Will	Australia (AUS) B Odette Lynch; Summer Nordmeyer; Lilyth Jones; Isla Carr	
2025 UEC European Track Championships; Belgium; 12–16 February 2025; CC
2025 UEC European Track Championships; Belgium; 12–16 February 2025; CC	Elimination Race	(Germany) Tim Torn Teutenberg	(Portugal) Rui Oliveira	(Belgium) Jules Hesters	
2025 UEC European Track Championships; Belgium; 12–16 February 2025; CC	Elimination Race	(Republic of Ireland) Lara Gillespie	(Belgium) Hélène Hesters	(Netherlands) Lisa van Belle	
2025 UEC European Track Championships; Belgium; 12–16 February 2025; CC	Individual Pursuit	(United Kingdom) Josh Charlton	(Portugal) Ivo Oliveira	(United Kingdom) Michael Gill	
2025 UEC European Track Championships; Belgium; 12–16 February 2025; CC	Individual Pursuit	(United Kingdom) Anna Morris	(Italy) Vittoria Guazzini	(Germany) Mieke Kröger	
2025 UEC European Track Championships; Belgium; 12–16 February 2025; CC	Keirin	(Netherlands) Harrie Lavreysen	(Germany) Maximilian Dörnbach	(France) Tom Derache	
2025 UEC European Track Championships; Belgium; 12–16 February 2025; CC	Keirin	(Netherlands) Steffie van der Peet	(United Kingdom) Rhian Edmunds	(Netherlands) Hetty van de Wouw	
2025 UEC European Track Championships; Belgium; 12–16 February 2025; CC	Omnium	(Germany) Tim Torn Teutenberg	(Denmark) Niklas Larsen	(Netherlands) Philip Heijnen	
2025 UEC European Track Championships; Belgium; 12–16 February 2025; CC	Omnium	(Netherlands) Lorena Wiebes	(United Kingdom) Maddie Leech	(Denmark) Amalie Dideriksen	
2025 UEC European Track Championships; Belgium; 12–16 February 2025; CC	Points Race	(Portugal) Iúri Leitão	(Netherlands) Yanne Dorenbos	(Belgium) Jasper De Buyst	
2025 UEC European Track Championships; Belgium; 12–16 February 2025; CC	Points Race	(Norway) Anita Stenberg	(France) Marion Borras	(Netherlands) Maike van der Duin	
2025 UEC European Track Championships; Belgium; 12–16 February 2025; CC	Scratch	(Portugal) Iúri Leitão	(Netherlands) Vincent Hoppezak	(United Kingdom) William Tidball	
2025 UEC European Track Championships; Belgium; 12–16 February 2025; CC	Scratch	(Italy) Martina Fidanza	(Netherlands) Lorena Wiebes	(Portugal) Maria Martins	
2025 UEC European Track Championships; Belgium; 12–16 February 2025; CC	Sprint	(Netherlands) Harrie Lavreysen	(Israel) Mikhail Iakovlev	(France) Rayan Helal	
2025 UEC European Track Championships; Belgium; 12–16 February 2025; CC	Sprint	Yana Burlakova	(United Kingdom) Rhian Edmunds	Alina Lysenko	
2025 UEC European Track Championships; Belgium; 12–16 February 2025; CC	Time Trial	(Italy) Matteo Bianchi	(Germany) Maximilian Dörnbach	(Czech Republic) David Peterka	
2025 UEC European Track Championships; Belgium; 12–16 February 2025; CC	Time Trial	(Netherlands) Hetty van de Wouw	(Italy) Martina Fidanza	(Germany) Clara Schneider	
2025 UEC European Track Championships; Belgium; 12–16 February 2025; CC	Madison	(Netherlands) Yanne Dorenbos (Netherlands) Vincent Hoppezak	(Germany) Roger Kluge (Germany) Tim Torn Teutenberg	(Portugal) Ivo Oliveira (Portugal) Rui Oliveira	
2025 UEC European Track Championships; Belgium; 12–16 February 2025; CC	Madison	(Netherlands) Lisa van Belle (Netherlands) Maike van der Duin	(Italy) Chiara Consonni (Italy) Vittoria Guazzini	(France) Victoire Berteau (France) Marion Borras	
2025 UEC European Track Championships; Belgium; 12–16 February 2025; CC	Team Sprint	France (FRA); Timmy Gillion; Rayan Helal; Sébastien Vigier	Netherlands (NED); Harrie Lavreysen; Loris Leneman; Tijmen van Loon	Great Britain (GBR); Harry Ledingham-Horn; Hayden Norris; Harry Radford	
2025 UEC European Track Championships; Belgium; 12–16 February 2025; CC	Team Sprint	Netherlands (NED); Kimberly Kalee; Hetty van de Wouw; Steffie van der Peet	Great Britain (GBR); Lauren Bell; Rhian Edmunds; Rhianna Parris-Smith	Germany (GER); Lea Friedrich; Pauline Grabosch; Clara Schneider	
2025 UEC European Track Championships; Belgium; 12–16 February 2025; CC	Team Pursuit	Denmark (DEN); Tobias Hansen; Niklas Larsen; Lasse Norman Leth; Robin Juel Skivild	Great Britain (GBR); Rhys Britton; Josh Charlton; Michael Gill; Noah Hobbs; William Tidball (R)	Switzerland (SUI); Noah Bögli; Mats Poot; Pascal Tappeiner; Alex Vogel	
2025 UEC European Track Championships; Belgium; 12–16 February 2025; CC	Team Pursuit	Italy (ITA); Martina Alzini; Chiara Consonni; Martina Fidanza; Vittoria Guazzini	Germany (GER); Franziska Brauße; Lisa Klein; Mieke Kröger; Laura Süßemilch	Great Britain (GBR); Maddie Leech; Sophie Lewis; Grace Lister; Anna Morris; Neah Evans (R)	
2025 Asian Track Cycling Championships; Malaysia; 21–27 February 2025; CC
2025 Asian Track Cycling Championships; Malaysia; 21–27 February 2025; CC	Elimination Race	(Japan) Eiya Hashimoto	(South Korea) Park Sang-hoon	(Indonesia) Bernard Van Aert	
2025 Asian Track Cycling Championships; Malaysia; 21–27 February 2025; CC	Elimination Race	(Japan) Tsuyaka Uchino	(Hong Kong) Lee Sze Wing	(South Korea) Jang Soo-ji	
2025 Asian Track Cycling Championships; Malaysia; 21–27 February 2025; CC	Individual Pursuit	(Japan) Kazushige Kuboki	(United Arab Emirates) Mohammad Al Mutaiwei	(South Korea) Min Kyeong-ho	
2025 Asian Track Cycling Championships; Malaysia; 21–27 February 2025; CC	Individual Pursuit	(Japan) Maho Kakita	(South Korea) Shin Ji-eun	(Malaysia) Zhen Yi Yeong	
2025 Asian Track Cycling Championships; Malaysia; 21–27 February 2025; CC	Keirin	(Japan) Shinji Nakano	(Malaysia) Muhammad Shah Firdaus Sahrom	(Japan) Kaiya Ota	
2025 Asian Track Cycling Championships; Malaysia; 21–27 February 2025; CC	Keirin	(Malaysia) Nurul Izzah Izzati Mohd Asri	(South Korea) Kim Ha-eun	(China) Guo Yufang	
2025 Asian Track Cycling Championships; Malaysia; 21–27 February 2025; CC	Omnium	(Japan) Naoki Kojima	(Indonesia) Bernard Van Aert	(Chinese Taipei) Li Jing-feng	
2025 Asian Track Cycling Championships; Malaysia; 21–27 February 2025; CC	Omnium	(Japan) Mizuki Ikeda	(Hong Kong) Lee Sze Wing	(Uzbekistan) Nafosat Kozieva	
2025 Asian Track Cycling Championships; Malaysia; 21–27 February 2025; CC	Points Race	(Japan) Tetsuo Yamamoto	(Kazakhstan) Alisher Zhumakan	(Hong Kong) Mow Ching Yin	
2025 Asian Track Cycling Championships; Malaysia; 21–27 February 2025; CC	Points Race	(Japan) Maho Kakita	(Malaysia) Nur Aisyah Mohamad Zubir	(Uzbekistan) Nafosat Kozieva	
2025 Asian Track Cycling Championships; Malaysia; 21–27 February 2025; CC	Scratch	(Uzbekistan) Dmitriy Bocharov	(Japan) Kazushige Kuboki	(Indonesia) Terry Yudha Kusuma	
2025 Asian Track Cycling Championships; Malaysia; 21–27 February 2025; CC	Scratch	(Hong Kong) Lee Sze Wing	(Malaysia) Nur Aisyah Mohamad Zubir	(Japan) Ayana Mizutani	
2025 Asian Track Cycling Championships; Malaysia; 21–27 February 2025; CC	Sprint	(Japan) Kaiya Ota	(Japan) Shinji Nakano	(Malaysia) Muhammad Shah Firdaus Sahrom	
2025 Asian Track Cycling Championships; Malaysia; 21–27 February 2025; CC	Sprint	(Japan) Mina Sato	(China) Guo Yufang	(Malaysia) Nurul Izzah Izzati Mohd Asri	
2025 Asian Track Cycling Championships; Malaysia; 21–27 February 2025; CC	Time Trial	(Japan) Ryuto Ichida	(China) Liu Qi	(Kazakhstan) Kirill Kurdidi	
2025 Asian Track Cycling Championships; Malaysia; 21–27 February 2025; CC	Time Trial	(Malaysia) Nurul Izzah Izzati Mohd Asri	(China) Luo Shuyan	(South Korea) Hwang Hyeon-seo	
2025 Asian Track Cycling Championships; Malaysia; 21–27 February 2025; CC	Madison	(Japan) Eiya Hashimoto (Japan) Kazushige Kuboki	(South Korea) Kim Eu-ro (South Korea) Park Sang-hoon	(Indonesia) Terry Yudha Kusuma (Indonesia) Bernard Van Aert	
2025 Asian Track Cycling Championships; Malaysia; 21–27 February 2025; CC	Madison	(Japan) Yumi Kajihara (Japan) Tsuyaka Uchino	(Hong Kong) Lee Sze Wing (Hong Kong) Wing Yee Leung	(Uzbekistan) Nafosat Kozieva (Uzbekistan) Asal Rizaeva	
2025 Asian Track Cycling Championships; Malaysia; 21–27 February 2025; CC	Team Sprint	Japan (JPN); Yoshitaku Nagasako; Kaiya Ota; Shinji Nakano	China (CHN); Tang Haoju; Feng Yusheng; Liu Qi	Malaysia (MAS); Mohd Akmal Nazimi Jusena; Muhammad Ridwan Sahrom; Fadhil Zonis	
2025 Asian Track Cycling Championships; Malaysia; 21–27 February 2025; CC	Team Sprint	China (CHN); Bao Shanju; Guo Yufang; Luo Shuyan	Malaysia (MAS); Anis Amira Rosidi; Nurul Izzah Izzati Mohd Asri; Nur Alyssa Mohd Farid	Japan (JPN); Aki Sakai; Mina Sato; Haruka Nakazawa	
2025 Asian Track Cycling Championships; Malaysia; 21–27 February 2025; CC	Team Pursuit	South Korea (KOR); Hong Seung-min; Park Sang-hoon; Kim Hyeon-seok; Min Kyeong-ho	Japan (JPN); Naoki Kojima; Eiya Hashimoto; Shoi Matsuda; Kazushige Kuboki	Kazakhstan (KAZ); Ilya Karabutov; Maxim Khoroshavin; Dmitriy Noskov; Alisher Zhumakan	
2025 Asian Track Cycling Championships; Malaysia; 21–27 February 2025; CC	Team Pursuit	Japan (JPN); Mizuki Ikeda; Tsuyaka Uchino; Yumi Kajihara; Maho Kakita	South Korea (KOR); Shin Ji-eun; Jang Soo-ji; Kim Min-jeong; Song Min-ji	Hong Kong (HKG); Lee Sze Wing; Leung Bo Yee; Leung Wing Yee; Yang Qianyu	

=== March ===
Event	Race	Winner	Second	Third	Ref
Life's an Omnium Madison; Switzerland; 13–14 March 2025; CL2
Life's an Omnium Madison; Switzerland; 13–14 March 2025; CL2	Men's Madison	(France) Christophe Brioux (France) Louis Pijourlet	(Switzerland) Jonas Müller (Switzerland) Pascal Tappeiner	(Switzerland) Andrin Gees (Switzerland) Justin Weder	
Life's an Omnium Madison; Switzerland; 13–14 March 2025; CL2	Women's Elimination Race	(Switzerland) Cybèle Schneider	(Ukraine) Iryna Shymanska	(Czech Republic) Hana Rugovac	
Life's an Omnium Madison; Switzerland; 13–14 March 2025; CL2	Points Race	(France) Louis Pijourlet	(Switzerland) Jonas Müller	(Austria) Franz-Josef Lässer	
Life's an Omnium Madison; Switzerland; 13–14 March 2025; CL2	Points Race	(Switzerland) Cybèle Schneider	(Czech Republic) Hana Rugovac	(Laos) Fanny Malissa Cauchois One	
Life's an Omnium Madison; Switzerland; 13–14 March 2025; CL2	Scratch Race	(Switzerland) Pascal Tappeiner	(France) Louis Pijourlet	(France) Melvin Landerneau	
Life's an Omnium Madison; Switzerland; 13–14 March 2025; CL2	Scratch Race	(Switzerland) Cybèle Schneider	(Czech Republic) Hana Rugovac	(Switzerland) Livia Steinmann	
UCI Track Nations Cup; Turkey; 14–16 March 2025; CDN
UCI Track Nations Cup; Turkey; 14–16 March 2025; CDN	Elimination Race	(Belgium) Jules Hesters	(Denmark) Noah Wulff	(Austria) Tim Wafler	
UCI Track Nations Cup; Turkey; 14–16 March 2025; CDN	Elimination Race	(Mexico) Yareli Acevedo	(Netherlands) Lisa van Belle	(Japan) Mizuki Ikeda	
UCI Track Nations Cup; Turkey; 14–16 March 2025; CDN	Keirin	(Malaysia) Muhammad Shah Firdaus Sahrom	(France) Sébastien Vigier	(Japan) Shinji Nakano	
UCI Track Nations Cup; Turkey; 14–16 March 2025; CDN	Keirin	(France) Mathilde Gros	(Czech Republic) Veronika Jaborníková	(Japan) Mina Sato	
UCI Track Nations Cup; Turkey; 14–16 March 2025; CDN	Omnium	(Netherlands) Yanne Dorenbos	(United States) Ashlin Barry	(Japan) Kazushige Kuboki	
UCI Track Nations Cup; Turkey; 14–16 March 2025; CDN	Omnium	(New Zealand) Ally Wollaston	(Netherlands) Lisa van Belle	(Authorised Neutral Athletes) Valeria Valgonen	
UCI Track Nations Cup; Turkey; 14–16 March 2025; CDN	Sprint	(United Kingdom) Matthew Richardson	(United Kingdom) Harry Ledingham-Horn	(France) Rayan Helal	
UCI Track Nations Cup; Turkey; 14–16 March 2025; CDN	Sprint	(China) Yuan Liying	(Authorised Neutral Athletes) Alina Lysenko	(Netherlands) Hetty van de Wouw	
UCI Track Nations Cup; Turkey; 14–16 March 2025; CDN	Madison	Spain (ESP); Sebastián Mora Verdi; Albert Torres Barceló	Netherlands (NED); Vincent Hoppezak; Yoeri Havik	Belgium (BEL); Jules Hesters; Noah Vandenbranden	
UCI Track Nations Cup; Turkey; 14–16 March 2025; CDN	Madison	Denmark (DEN); Amalie Dideriksen; Ellen Klinge	Germany (GER); Messane Bräutigam; Lea Lin Teutenberg	New Zealand (NZL); Samantha Donnelly; Emily Shearman	
UCI Track Nations Cup; Turkey; 14–16 March 2025; CDN	Team Sprint	Great Britain (GBR); Harry Radford; Matthew Richardson; Harry Ledingham-Horn	Japan (JPN); Yoshitaku Nagasako; Kaiya Ota; Yuta Obara	Australia (AUS); Ryan Elliott; Leigh Hoffman; Daniel Barber	
UCI Track Nations Cup; Turkey; 14–16 March 2025; CDN	Team Sprint	Netherlands (NED); Kimberley Kalee; Hetty van de Wouw; Steffie van der Peet	Great Britain (GBR); Lowri Thomas; Lauren Bell; Rhian Edmunds	Germany (GER); Lea Friedrich; Clara Schneider; Pauline Grabosch	
UCI Track Nations Cup; Turkey; 14–16 March 2025; CDN	Team Pursuit	Australia (AUS); Joshua Duffy; Liam Walsh; Blake Agnoletto; James Moriarty	United States (USA); Ashlin Barry; David Domonoske; Graeme Frislie; Anders Johnson	New Zealand (NZL); Thomas Sexton; Marshall Erwood; Keegan Hornblow; Nick Kergozou	
UCI Track Nations Cup; Turkey; 14–16 March 2025; CDN	Team Pursuit	Germany (GER); Messane Bräutigam; Franziska Brausse; Lisa Klein; Laura Süssemilch	New Zealand (NZL); Emily Shearman; Prudence Fowler; Bryony Botha; Samantha Donnelly	Australia (AUS); Maeve Plouffe; Keira Will; Claudia Marcks; Sophie Edwards	

=== April ===
Event	Race	Winner	Second	Third	Ref
2025 Pan American Track Cycling Championships; Paraguay; 1–6 April 2025; CC
2025 Pan American Track Cycling Championships; Paraguay; 1–6 April 2025; CC	Elimination Race	(United States) Brendan Rhim	(Colombia) Jordan Parra	(Chile) Jacob Decar	
2025 Pan American Track Cycling Championships; Paraguay; 1–6 April 2025; CC	Elimination Race	(Mexico) Yareli Acevedo	(Chile) Johanna Cortés	(Trinidad and Tobago) Teniel Campbell	
2025 Pan American Track Cycling Championships; Paraguay; 1–6 April 2025; CC	Individual Pursuit	(United States) Anders Johnson	(Colombia) Anderson Arboleda	(Canada) Cam Fitzmaurice	
2025 Pan American Track Cycling Championships; Paraguay; 1–6 April 2025; CC	Individual Pursuit	(United States) Emily Ehrlich	(Canada) Ariane Bonhomme	(Canada) Skyler Goudswaard	
2025 Pan American Track Cycling Championships; Paraguay; 1–6 April 2025; CC	Keirin	(Colombia) Kevin Quintero	(Trinidad and Tobago) Nicholas Paul	(Canada) Nick Wammes	
2025 Pan American Track Cycling Championships; Paraguay; 1–6 April 2025; CC	Keirin	(Canada) Lauriane Genest	(Mexico) Yuli Verdugo	(Colombia) Stefany Cuadrado	
2025 Pan American Track Cycling Championships; Paraguay; 1–6 April 2025; CC	Omnium	(United States) Peter Moore	(Venezuela) Clever Martínez	(Argentina) Rubén Ramos	
2025 Pan American Track Cycling Championships; Paraguay; 1–6 April 2025; CC	Omnium	(Mexico) Yareli Acevedo	(Colombia) Lina Hernández	(United States) Bethany Ingram	
2025 Pan American Track Cycling Championships; Paraguay; 1–6 April 2025; CC	Points Race	(Peru) Hugo Néstor Ruiz	(Colombia) Nelson Soto	(Chile) Diego Rojas	
2025 Pan American Track Cycling Championships; Paraguay; 1–6 April 2025; CC	Points Race	(Trinidad and Tobago) Teniel Campbell	(Mexico) Sofía Arreola	(Colombia) Elizabeth Castaño	
2025 Pan American Track Cycling Championships; Paraguay; 1–6 April 2025; CC	Scratch	(Canada) Cam Fitzmaurice	(United States) Brendan Rhim	(Venezuela) Clever Martínez	
2025 Pan American Track Cycling Championships; Paraguay; 1–6 April 2025; CC	Scratch	(Mexico) Yareli Acevedo	(Cuba) Marlies Mejías	(Colombia) Elizabeth Castaño	
2025 Pan American Track Cycling Championships; Paraguay; 1–6 April 2025; CC	Sprint	(Trinidad and Tobago) Nicholas Paul	(Colombia) Kevin Quintero	(Colombia) Cristian Ortega	
2025 Pan American Track Cycling Championships; Paraguay; 1–6 April 2025; CC	Sprint	(Canada) Lauriane Genest	(Colombia) Stefany Cuadrado	(United States) Emily Hayes	
2025 Pan American Track Cycling Championships; Paraguay; 1–6 April 2025; CC	Time Trial	(Trinidad and Tobago) Nicholas Paul	(Colombia) Cristian Ortega	(Canada) James Hedgcock	
2025 Pan American Track Cycling Championships; Paraguay; 1–6 April 2025; CC	Time Trial	(Colombia) Stefany Cuadrado	(United States) Hayley Yoslov	(Colombia) Juliana Gaviria	
2025 Pan American Track Cycling Championships; Paraguay; 1–6 April 2025; CC	Madison	(United States) Peter Moore (United States) Brendan Rhim	(Colombia) Juan Arango (Colombia) Jordan Parra	(Argentina) Rubén Ramos (Argentina) Marcos Méndez	
2025 Pan American Track Cycling Championships; Paraguay; 1–6 April 2025; CC	Madison	(Colombia) Lina Hernández (Colombia) Elizabeth Castaño	(United States) Bethany Ingram (United States) Olivia Cummins	(Canada) Lily Plante (Canada) Fiona Majendie	
2025 Pan American Track Cycling Championships; Paraguay; 1–6 April 2025; CC	Team Sprint	Trinidad and Tobago (TTO); Ryan D'Abreau; Njisane Phillip; Nicholas Paul	Colombia (COL); Rubén Murillo; Kevin Quintero; Cristian Ortega	Mexico (MEX); Ridley Malo; Jafet López; Edgar Verdugo	
2025 Pan American Track Cycling Championships; Paraguay; 1–6 April 2025; CC	Team Sprint	United States (USA); Emily Hayes; Kayla Hankins; Hayley Yoslov	Colombia (COL); Yarli Mosquera; Juliana Gaviria; Stefany Cuadrado	Argentina (ARG); Valentina Luna; Natalia Andrea Vera; Valentina Mendez	
2025 Pan American Track Cycling Championships; Paraguay; 1–6 April 2025; CC	Team Pursuit	United States (USA); Peter Moore; Brendan Rhim; Anders Johnson; David Domonoske	Canada (CAN); Jonathan Hinse; Cam Fitzmaurice; Ethan Powell; Sean Richardson	Colombia (COL); Juan Arango; Brayan Sánchez; Nelson Soto; Anderson Arboleda	
2025 Pan American Track Cycling Championships; Paraguay; 1–6 April 2025; CC	Team Pursuit	United States (USA); Bethany Ingram; Olivia Cummins; Reagen Pattishall; Emily Ehrlich	Canada (CAN); Lily Plante; Skyler Goudswaard; Fiona Majendie; Ariane Bonhomme	Colombia (COL); Lina Hernández; Camila Valbuena; Elizabeth Castaño; Lina Rojas	
Good Friday Racing; United Kingdom; 18 April 2025; CL2
Good Friday Racing; United Kingdom; 18 April 2025; CL2	Elimination Race	(United Kingdom) Ben Swift	(United Kingdom) William Roberts	(United Kingdom) James Ambrose-Parish	
Good Friday Racing; United Kingdom; 18 April 2025; CL2	Elimination Race	(United Kingdom) Jenny Holl	(United States) Kimberly Zubris	(United Kingdom) Lucy Glover	
Good Friday Racing; United Kingdom; 18 April 2025; CL2	Points Race	(United Kingdom) Frank Longstaff	(United Kingdom) William Roberts	(United Kingdom) Ben Swift	
Good Friday Racing; United Kingdom; 18 April 2025; CL2	Points Race	(United Kingdom) Jenny Holl	(United Kingdom) Lucy Glover	(United States) Kimberly Zubris	
Good Friday Racing; United Kingdom; 18 April 2025; CL2	Scratch	(United Kingdom) Frank Longstaff	(United Kingdom) Logan Maclean	(United Kingdom) William Roberts	
Good Friday Racing; United Kingdom; 18 April 2025; CL2	Scratch	(United Kingdom) Jenny Holl	(United Kingdom) Katie-Anne Calton	(United Kingdom) Lucy Glover	
Good Friday Racing; United Kingdom; 18 April 2025; CL2	Men's Sprint	(United Kingdom) Matthew Richardson	(United Kingdom) Peter Mitchell	(United States) Noah Mandow	
Belgian Open Track Meeting; Belgium; 18–20 April 2025; CL1
Belgian Open Track Meeting; Belgium; 18–20 April 2025; CL1	Keirin	(Belgium) Lowie Nulens	(Czech Republic) David Peterka	(Norway) Tim Edvard Pettersen	
Belgian Open Track Meeting; Belgium; 18–20 April 2025; CL1	Keirin	(United Kingdom) Emma Finucane	(Germany) Lea Friedrich	(United Kingdom) Lauren Bell	
Belgian Open Track Meeting; Belgium; 18–20 April 2025; CL1	Madison	(Netherlands) Philip Heijnen (Netherlands) Yoeri Havik	(Belgium) Jasper De Buyst (Belgium) Lindsay De Vylder	(Germany) Moritz Malcharek (Germany) Moritz Augenstein	
Belgian Open Track Meeting; Belgium; 18–20 April 2025; CL1	Madison	(United Kingdom) Katie Archibald (United Kingdom) Jessica Roberts	(France) Clara Copponi (France) Clémence Chereau	(Italy) Martina Fidanza (Italy) Anita Baima	
Belgian Open Track Meeting; Belgium; 18–20 April 2025; CL1	Sprint	(United Kingdom) Hamish Turnbull	(France) Tom Derache	(Germany) Henric Hackmann	
Belgian Open Track Meeting; Belgium; 18–20 April 2025; CL1	Sprint	(United Kingdom) Emma Finucane	(United Kingdom) Sophie Capewell	(Germany) Lea Friedrich	
Belgian Open Track Meeting; Belgium; 18–20 April 2025; CL1	Women's Points Race	(Denmark) Laura Auerbach-Lind	(Netherlands) Juliet Eickhof	(Norway) Anita Stenberg	
Belgian Open Track Meeting; Belgium; 18–20 April 2025; CL1	Scratch	(Germany) Moritz Augenstein	(Czech Republic) Adam Křenek	(France) Erwan Besnier	
Belgian Open Track Meeting; Belgium; 18–20 April 2025; CL1	Scratch	(Norway) Anita Stenberg	(France) Clara Copponi	(Canada) Maggie Coles-Lyster	
Belgian Open Track Meeting; Belgium; 18–20 April 2025; CL1	Elimination Race	(Germany) Tim Torn Teutenberg	(France) Erwan Besnier	(Italy) Davide Stella	
Belgian Open Track Meeting; Belgium; 18–20 April 2025; CL1	Elimination Race	(United Kingdom) Katie Archibald	(Canada) Maggie Coles-Lyster	(Czech Republic) Petra Ševčíková	
Belgian Open Track Meeting; Belgium; 18–20 April 2025; CL1	Omnium	(Germany) Moritz Augenstein	(Belgium) Lindsay De Vylder	(Netherlands) Philip Heijnen	
Belgian Open Track Meeting; Belgium; 18–20 April 2025; CL1	Omnium	(United Kingdom) Katie Archibald	(France) Clara Copponi	(Norway) Anita Stenberg	
Easter International Grand Prix; Trinidad and Tobago; 18–19 April 2025; CL2
Easter International Grand Prix; Trinidad and Tobago; 18–19 April 2025; CL2	Points Race	(Trinidad and Tobago) Jadian Neaves	(United States) Bradley Green	(Trinidad and Tobago) Akil Campbell	
Easter International Grand Prix; Trinidad and Tobago; 18–19 April 2025; CL2	Points Race	(United States) Elizabeth Harden	(United States) Reagen Pattishall	(United States) Lily Katherine Kendall	
Easter International Grand Prix; Trinidad and Tobago; 18–19 April 2025; CL2	Scratch	(Trinidad and Tobago) Liam Trepte	(United States) Luke Fetzer	(United States) Bradley Green	
Easter International Grand Prix; Trinidad and Tobago; 18–19 April 2025; CL2	Elimination Race	(Trinidad and Tobago) Jadian Neaves	(Trinidad and Tobago) Akil Campbell	(Trinidad and Tobago) Liam Trepte	
Easter International Grand Prix; Trinidad and Tobago; 18–19 April 2025; CL2	Elimination Race	(United States) Lily Katherine Kendall	(United States) Reagen Pattishall	(United States) Elizabeth Harden	
Easter International Grand Prix; Trinidad and Tobago; 18–19 April 2025; CL2	Keirin	(Trinidad and Tobago) Kwesi Browne	(Trinidad and Tobago) Danell James	(Trinidad and Tobago) Ryan D'Abreau	
Easter International Grand Prix; Trinidad and Tobago; 18–19 April 2025; CL2	Keirin	(Trinidad and Tobago) Phoebe Sandy	(Trinidad and Tobago) Adrianna Seyjagat	(Suriname) Tachana Dalger	
Hong Kong International Track Cup I Hong Kong; 19 April 2025; CL2
Hong Kong International Track Cup I Hong Kong; 19 April 2025; CL2	Team Sprint	Japan (JPN); Kanata Takahashi; Minato Nakaishi; Ryuto Ichida	Kazakhstan (KAZ); Daniyar Shayakhmetov; Kirill Kurdidi; Ramazan Mukhtar	Hong Kong (HKG); Mok Tsz Chun; Cheuk Hei To; Tsun Ho Yung	
Hong Kong International Track Cup I Hong Kong; 19 April 2025; CL2	Team Sprint	Japan (JPN); Aki Sakai; Haruka Nakazawa; Noa Obara	Hong Kong (HKG); Yeung Cho-yiu; Phoebe Tung; Sze Wing Ng	India (IND); Celestina Chelobroy; Mayuri Lute; Sarita Kumari	
Hong Kong International Track Cup I Hong Kong; 19 April 2025; CL2	Omnium	(Kazakhstan) Ramis Dinmukhametov	(Australia) Conor Leahy	(Hong Kong) Mow Ching Yin	
Hong Kong International Track Cup I Hong Kong; 19 April 2025; CL2	Omnium	(Japan) Yumi Kajihara	Hanna Tserakh	(Hong Kong) Lee Sze Wing	
Hong Kong International Track Cup I Hong Kong; 19 April 2025; CL2	Keirin	(Japan) Minato Nakaishi	Nikita Kiriltsev	(Hong Kong) Cheuk Hei To	
Hong Kong International Track Cup I Hong Kong; 19 April 2025; CL2	Keirin	(China) Yuan Liying	Yana Burlakova	(Japan) Haruka Nakazawa	
Easter International Grand Prix; Trinidad and Tobago; 20 April 2025; CL2
Easter International Grand Prix; Trinidad and Tobago; 20 April 2025; CL2	Keirin				
Easter International Grand Prix; Trinidad and Tobago; 20 April 2025; CL2	Men's Madison				
Easter International Grand Prix; Trinidad and Tobago; 20 April 2025; CL2	Omnium	(United States) Luke Fetzer	(Trinidad and Tobago) Jadian Neaves	(United States) Bradley Green	
Easter International Grand Prix; Trinidad and Tobago; 20 April 2025; CL2	Sprint	(Trinidad and Tobago) Kwesi Browne	(Trinidad and Tobago) Zion Pulido	(Trinidad and Tobago) Danell James	
Easter International Grand Prix; Trinidad and Tobago; 20 April 2025; CL2	Sprint	(Trinidad and Tobago) Phoebe Sandy	(Suriname) Tachana Dalgar	(Trinidad and Tobago) Alexia Wilson	
Hong Kong International Track Cup II; Hong Kong; 20–21 April 2025; CL2
Hong Kong International Track Cup II; Hong Kong; 20–21 April 2025; CL2	Scratch	(Hong Kong) Pak Hang Ng	(Malaysia) Abdul Azim Aliyas	(Japan) Naoki Kojima	
Hong Kong International Track Cup II; Hong Kong; 20–21 April 2025; CL2	Scratch	(Australia) Sophie Edwards	(Japan) Ayana Mizutani	(China) Liu De Xiang	
Hong Kong International Track Cup II; Hong Kong; 20–21 April 2025; CL2	Elimination Race	(Australia) Kurt Eather	(Kazakhstan) Ilya Karabutov	(Kazakhstan) Ramis Dinmukhametov	
Hong Kong International Track Cup II; Hong Kong; 20–21 April 2025; CL2	Elimination Race	(Japan) Yumi Kajihara	Polina Konrad	(Hong Kong) Lee Sze Wing	
Hong Kong International Track Cup II; Hong Kong; 20–21 April 2025; CL2	Keirin	(Japan) Minato Nakaishi	(India) David Beckham Elkatohchoongo	Nikita Kiriltsev	
Hong Kong International Track Cup II; Hong Kong; 20–21 April 2025; CL2	Keirin	(China) Yuan Liying	Yana Burlakova	(Japan) Haruka Nakazawa	
Hong Kong International Track Cup II; Hong Kong; 20–21 April 2025; CL2	Sprint	Nikita Kiriltsev	Artsiom Zaitsau	(Japan) Ryuto Ichida	
Hong Kong International Track Cup II; Hong Kong; 20–21 April 2025; CL2	Sprint	(China) Yuan Liying	Yana Burlakova	(Japan) Noa Obara	
Hong Kong International Track Cup II; Hong Kong; 20–21 April 2025; CL2	Omnium	(Japan) Naoki Kojima	(Japan) Kanta Umezawa	(Japan) Tetsuo Yamamoto	
Hong Kong International Track Cup II; Hong Kong; 20–21 April 2025; CL2	Omnium	(Japan) Yumi Kajihara	(Hong Kong) Lee Sze Wing	(Japan) Misaki Okamoto	
Hong Kong International Track Cup II; Hong Kong; 20–21 April 2025; CL2	Madison	(Japan) Naoki Kojima (Japan) Shoi Matsuda	(Kazakhstan) Ramis Dinmukhametov (Kazakhstan) Ilya Karabutov	(Japan) Katsuya Okamoto (Japan) Kanta Umezawa	
Hong Kong International Track Cup II; Hong Kong; 20–21 April 2025; CL2	Madison	Iryna Chuyankova; Hanna Tserakh	(Australia) Sophie Edwards (Australia) Claudia Marcks	(Japan) Yumi Kajihara (Japan) Ayana Mizutani	

=== May ===
Event	Race	Winner	Second	Third	Ref
GP Prešov Qualifier Series I Slovakia; 3–4 May 2025; CL2
GP Prešov Qualifier Series I Slovakia; 3–4 May 2025; CL2	Scratch	(Poland) Filip Prokopyszyn	(Poland) Daniel Staniszewski	(Austria) Tim Wafler	
GP Prešov Qualifier Series I Slovakia; 3–4 May 2025; CL2	Scratch	(Poland) Eliza Rabażyńska	(Lithuania) Olivija Baleišytė	(Slovakia) Alžbeta Bačíková	
GP Prešov Qualifier Series I Slovakia; 3–4 May 2025; CL2	Elimination Race	(Austria) Tim Wafler	(Poland) Daniel Staniszewski	(Czech Republic) Adam Křenek	
GP Prešov Qualifier Series I Slovakia; 3–4 May 2025; CL2	Elimination Race	(Poland) Eliza Rabażyńska	(Lithuania) Olivija Baleišytė	(Slovakia) Alžbeta Bačíková	
GP Prešov Qualifier Series I Slovakia; 3–4 May 2025; CL2	Omnium	(Poland) Filip Prokopyszyn	(Poland) Daniel Staniszewski	(Austria) Tim Wafler	
GP Prešov Qualifier Series I Slovakia; 3–4 May 2025; CL2	Omnium	(Czech Republic) Veronika Bartoníková	(Poland) Eliza Rabażyńska	(Slovakia) Alžbeta Bačíková	
GP Prešov Qualifier Series I Slovakia; 3–4 May 2025; CL2	Madison	(Austria) Tim Wafler (Austria) Maximilian Schmidbauer	(Poland) Daniel Staniszewski (Poland) Wojciech Pszczolarski	(Czech Republic) Adam Křenek (Czech Republic) Jan Voneš	
Silk Way Namangan; Uzbekistan; 7–10 May 2025; CL2
Silk Way Namangan; Uzbekistan; 7–10 May 2025; CL2	Points Race	(Kazakhstan) Alisher Zhumakan	(Kazakhstan) Vladislav Skibin	(Uzbekistan) Alimardon Jamoldinov	
Silk Way Namangan; Uzbekistan; 7–10 May 2025; CL2	Points Race	Polina Konrad	Maria Averina	Iryna Chuyankova	
Silk Way Namangan; Uzbekistan; 7–10 May 2025; CL2	Team Pursuit	Kazakhstan (KAZ); Alisher Zhumakan; Dmitriy Noskov; Maxim Khoroshavin; Ilya Karabutov	Uzbekistan (UZB); Alimardon Jamoldinov; Vladislav Troman; Daniil Fedorov; Davirjan Abdurakhmanov	Turkmenistan (TKM); Ihlasbek Adylbekov; Begench Hudaygulyyev; Sultanbay Haitbayev; Gadam Koshiliyev	
Silk Way Namangan; Uzbekistan; 7–10 May 2025; CL2	Team Pursuit	Uzbekistan (UZB) A Samira Ismailova; Asal Rizaeva; Evgeniya Golotina; Madina Kakhkhorova	Uzbekistan (UZB) B Kseniya Li; Mohinabonu Elmurodova; Shakhnoza Abdullaeva; Madina Davronova		
Silk Way Namangan; Uzbekistan; 7–10 May 2025; CL2	Men's Team Sprint	(Kazakhstan) Kirill Kurdidi (Kazakhstan) Daniyar Shayakhmetov (Kazakhstan) Ramazan Mukhtar	Yauheni Karaliok; Alexander Dubchenko; Maxim Naumov	(Kazakhstan) Dmitriy Rezanov (Kazakhstan) Andrey Chugay (Kazakhstan) Viktor Golov	
Silk Way Namangan; Uzbekistan; 7–10 May 2025; CL2	Omnium	(Kazakhstan) Alisher Zhumakan	(Kazakhstan) Dmitriy Noskov	(Armenia) Artur Vareljyan	
Silk Way Namangan; Uzbekistan; 7–10 May 2025; CL2	Omnium	Hanna Tserakh	Polina Konrad	Iryna Chuyankova	
Silk Way Namangan; Uzbekistan; 7–10 May 2025; CL2	Sprint	Artsiom Zaitsau	Igor Girilovich	Aleksandr Dubchenko	
Silk Way Namangan; Uzbekistan; 7–10 May 2025; CL2	Sprint	Ekaterina Evlanova	Varvara Basiakova	(Azerbaijan) Viktoriya Sidorenko	
Silk Way Namangan; Uzbekistan; 7–10 May 2025; CL2	Keirin	Artsiom Zaitsau	Aleksandr Dubchenko	Igor Girilovich	
Silk Way Namangan; Uzbekistan; 7–10 May 2025; CL2	Keirin	Ekaterina Evlanova	Varvara Basiakova	Kseniya Shynkarenka	
Silk Way Namangan; Uzbekistan; 7–10 May 2025; CL2	Scratch	(Armenia) Artur Vareljyan	(Kazakhstan) Vladislav Skibin	(Kazakhstan) Ilya Karabutov	
Silk Way Namangan; Uzbekistan; 7–10 May 2025; CL2	Scratch	Hanna Tserakh	Iryna Chuyankova	Mariia Averina	
Silk Way Namangan; Uzbekistan; 7–10 May 2025; CL2	Elimination Race	(Kazakhstan) Ilya Karabutov	(Kazakhstan) Sergey Karmazhakov	(Kazakhstan) Dmitriy Noskov	
Silk Way Namangan; Uzbekistan; 7–10 May 2025; CL2	Elimination Race	Iryna Chuyankova	Kseniya Shynkarenka	Hanna Tserakh	
Silk Way Namangan; Uzbekistan; 7–10 May 2025; CL2	Madison	(Kazakhstan) Sergey Karmazhakov (Kazakhstan) Ramis Dinmukhametov	(Kazakhstan) Alisher Zhumakan (Kazakhstan) Dmitriy Noskov	(Uzbekistan) Vladislav Troman (Uzbekistan) Davirjan Abdurakhmanov	
Silk Way Namangan; Uzbekistan; 7–10 May 2025; CL2	Madison	Kseniya Shynkarenka; Hanna Tserakh	(Uzbekistan) Evgeniya Golotina (Uzbekistan) Madina Kakhkhorova	(Uzbekistan) Samira Ismailova (Uzbekistan) Asal Rizaeva	
CAC Track African Championships; Egypt; 12–16 May 2025; CC
CAC Track African Championships; Egypt; 12–16 May 2025; CC	Elimination Race	(Egypt) Mahmoud Bakr	(Algeria) Mohamed-Nadjib Assal	(South Africa) Ethan Kulsen	
CAC Track African Championships; Egypt; 12–16 May 2025; CC	Elimination Race	(Egypt) Ebtissam Zayed Ahmed Mohamed	(Algeria) Nesrine Houili	(Egypt) Mentalla Belal	
CAC Track African Championships; Egypt; 12–16 May 2025; CC	Individual Pursuit	(Algeria) Oussama Abdellah Mimouni	(Egypt) Mahmoud Bakr	(South Africa) Rhys Burrell	
CAC Track African Championships; Egypt; 12–16 May 2025; CC	Individual Pursuit	(Algeria) Nesrine Houili	(South Africa) Anya du Plessis	(Egypt) Mentalla Belal	
CAC Track African Championships; Egypt; 12–16 May 2025; CC	Team Sprint	Egypt (EGY); Hussein Hassan; Mahmoud Elimbabi; Mahmoud Bakr	Algeria (ALG); Yacine Hamza; Mohamed-Nadjib Assal; Anes Riahi	South Africa (RSA); Ethan Kulsen; Tshilalahufhe Marubini Munyai; Carl Bonthuys	
CAC Track African Championships; Egypt; 12–16 May 2025; CC	Team Sprint	Egypt (EGY); Mentalla Belal; Shahd Mohamed; Sara Anwar	Nigeria (NGR); Grace Ayuba; Ese Ukpeseraye; Mary Samuel	South Africa (RSA); Anya du Plessis; Ainslii de Beer; Amber Hindmarch	
CAC Track African Championships; Egypt; 12–16 May 2025; CC	Team Pursuit	South Africa (RSA); Bradley Gouveris; Kellan Alex Gouveris; Rhys Burrell; Carl Bonthuys	Egypt (EGY); Mahmoud Bakr; Youssef Abouelhassan; Ahmed Elsenfawi; Assem Elhusseini Khalil	Algeria (ALG); Salah Eddine Ayoubi Cherki; Oussama Abdellah Mimouni; Lotfi Tchambaz; Yacine Chalel	
CAC Track African Championships; Egypt; 12–16 May 2025; CC	Team Pursuit	Egypt (EGY); Ebtissam Zayed Ahmed Mohamed; Mentalla Belal; Habiba Osama; Shahd Mohamed	Nigeria (NGR); Grace Ayuba; Ese Ukpeseraye; Mary Samuel; Patience Effiong Otuodung		
CAC Track African Championships; Egypt; 12–16 May 2025; CC	Scratch	(South Africa) Bradley Gouveris	(Egypt) Mahmoud Bakr	(Algeria) Hamza Amari	
CAC Track African Championships; Egypt; 12–16 May 2025; CC	Scratch	(Egypt) Ebtissam Zayed Ahmed Mohamed	(Algeria) Nesrine Houili	(South Africa) Anya du Plessis	
CAC Track African Championships; Egypt; 12–16 May 2025; CC	Sprint	(Egypt) Hussein Hassan	(Egypt) Mahmoud Elimbabi	(Burkina Faso) Abdoul Imaan Ouedraogo	
CAC Track African Championships; Egypt; 12–16 May 2025; CC	Sprint	(Egypt) Shahd Mohamed	(Nigeria) Ese Ukpeseraye	(South Africa) Amber Hindmarch	
CAC Track African Championships; Egypt; 12–16 May 2025; CC	Points Race	(Algeria) Anes Riahi	(South Africa) Kellan Alex Gouveris	(Algeria) Yacine Chalel	
CAC Track African Championships; Egypt; 12–16 May 2025; CC	Points Race	(Egypt) Ebtissam Zayed Ahmed Mohamed	(Algeria) Nesrine Houili	(Egypt) Shahd Mohamed	
CAC Track African Championships; Egypt; 12–16 May 2025; CC	Madison	(Egypt) Mahmoud Bakr (Egypt) Youssef Abouelhassan	(Algeria) Anes Riahi (Algeria) Hamza Amari	(South Africa) Carl Bonthuys (South Africa) Rhys Burrell	
CAC Track African Championships; Egypt; 12–16 May 2025; CC	Madison	(Egypt) Ebtissam Zayed Ahmed Mohamed (Egypt) Shahd Mohamed	(Algeria) Nesrine Houili (Algeria) Siham Bousba	(Algeria) Malak Mechab; Fatma Serine Houmel	
CAC Track African Championships; Egypt; 12–16 May 2025; CC	Omnium	(South Africa) Bradley Gouveris	(Egypt) Mahmoud Bakr	(Algeria) Hamza Amari	
CAC Track African Championships; Egypt; 12–16 May 2025; CC	Omnium	(Egypt) Ebtissam Zayed Ahmed Mohamed	(Nigeria) Ese Ukpeseraye	(Algeria) Siham Bousba	
CAC Track African Championships; Egypt; 12–16 May 2025; CC	Time Trial	(Egypt) Mahmoud Elimbabi	(South Africa) Ethan Kulsen	(Burkina Faso) Abdoul Imaan Ouedraogo	
CAC Track African Championships; Egypt; 12–16 May 2025; CC	Time Trial	(Algeria) Nesrine Houili	(Egypt) Shahd Mohamed	(Nigeria) Ese Ukpeseraye	
CAC Track African Championships; Egypt; 12–16 May 2025; CC	Keirin	(Egypt) Mahmoud Elimbabi	(Egypt) Hussein Hassan	(South Africa) Tshilalahufhe Marubini Munyai	
CAC Track African Championships; Egypt; 12–16 May 2025; CC	Keirin	(Egypt) Shahd Mohamed	(Nigeria) Ese Ukpeseraye	(Benin) Charlotte Metoevi	
500+1 kolo: Embedded UCI races Czech Republic; 13–15 May 2025; CL2
500+1 kolo: Embedded UCI races Czech Republic; 13–15 May 2025; CL2	Elimination Race	(Poland) Daniel Staniszewski	(Switzerland) Matteo Constant	(Austria) Raphael Kokas	
500+1 kolo: Embedded UCI races Czech Republic; 13–15 May 2025; CL2	Elimination Race	(Switzerland) Aline Seitz	(Switzerland) Fabienne Buri	(Germany) Lea Lin Teutenberg	
500+1 kolo: Embedded UCI races Czech Republic; 13–15 May 2025; CL2	Points Race	(Poland) Filip Prokopyszyn	(Germany) Moritz Augenstein	(Switzerland) Alex Vogel	
500+1 kolo: Embedded UCI races Czech Republic; 13–15 May 2025; CL2	Points Race	(Germany) Lea Lin Teutenberg	(Switzerland) Fabienne Buri	(Germany) Sina Temmen	
500+1 kolo: Embedded UCI races Czech Republic; 13–15 May 2025; CL2	Scratch	(Germany) Moritz Augenstein	(Turkey) Ramazan Yılmaz	(Switzerland) Alex Vogel	
500+1 kolo: Embedded UCI races Czech Republic; 13–15 May 2025; CL2	Scratch	(Poland) Eliza Rabażyńska	(Switzerland) Annika Liehner	(Germany) Lea Lin Teutenberg	

=== June ===
Event	Race	Winner	Second	Third	Ref

=== July ===
Event	Race	Winner	Second	Third	Ref

=== August ===
Event	Race	Winner	Second	Third	Ref

=== September ===
Event	Race	Winner	Second	Third	Ref

=== October ===
Event	Race	Winner	Second	Third	Ref

=== November ===
Event	Race	Winner	Second	Third	Ref

=== December ===
Event	Race	Winner	Second	Third	Ref

== National Championships ==
=== Elimination Race ===
Date	Venue	Podium (Men)		Podium (Women)	
10–12 January 2025	Canada; Bromont	1	Jonathan Hinse	1	Ngaire Barraclough
10–12 January 2025	Canada; Bromont	2	Ed Veal	2	Lily Plante
10–12 January 2025	Canada; Bromont	3	Carson Mattern	3	Jenna Nestman
18–19 January 2025	Switzerland; Grenchen	1	Alex Vogel	1	Michelle Andres
18–19 January 2025	Switzerland; Grenchen	2	Tom Bohli	2	Jasmin Liechti
18–19 January 2025	Switzerland; Grenchen	3	Pascal Tappeiner	3	Lorena Leu
1–2 February 2025	Portugal; Sangalhos	1	Rui Oliveira	1	Daniela Campos
1–2 February 2025	Portugal; Sangalhos	2	João Matias	2	Patrícia Duarte
1–2 February 2025	Portugal; Sangalhos	3	João Martins	3	Raquel Dias
7–9 February 2025	Slovenia; Novo Mesto	1	Žak Eržen	1	Neža Zupanič
7–9 February 2025	Slovenia; Novo Mesto	2	Tilen Finkšt	2	
7–9 February 2025	Slovenia; Novo Mesto	3	Jaka Špoljar	3	
20–23 February 2025	Barbados; Couva (Trinidad and Tobago)	1	Dominic Howard	1	
20–23 February 2025	Barbados; Couva (Trinidad and Tobago)	2		2	
20–23 February 2025	Barbados; Couva (Trinidad and Tobago)	3		3	
20–23 February 2025	Trinidad and Tobago; Couva	1	Akil Campbell	1	Alexi Costa-Ramirez
20–23 February 2025	Trinidad and Tobago; Couva	2	Tariq Woods	2	Teniel Campbell
20–23 February 2025	Trinidad and Tobago; Couva	3	Jadian Neaves	3	
21–23 February 2025	Brazil; Indaiatuba	1	Lauro Chaman	1	Amanda Kunkel
21–23 February 2025	Brazil; Indaiatuba	2	Samuel Hauane Reikdal Stachera	2	Ana Casetta
21–23 February 2025	Brazil; Indaiatuba	3	Lucca Marques	3	Márcia Fernandes
24 February – 1 March 2025	New Zealand; Invercargill	1	Magnus Jamieson	1	Emily Shearman
24 February – 1 March 2025	New Zealand; Invercargill	2	Luke Mudgway	2	Samantha Donnelly
24 February – 1 March 2025	New Zealand; Invercargill	3	James Gardner	3	Amelia Sykes
4–9 March 2025	Venezuela; San Cristóbal	1	Clever Martínez	1	Verónica Abreu
4–9 March 2025	Venezuela; San Cristóbal	2	Carlos Linarez	2	Katiuska García
4–9 March 2025	Venezuela; San Cristóbal	3	José Andrés Díaz	3	Raybeli Moreno
5–7 March 2025	Israel; Tel Aviv	1	Vladislav Loginov	1	Tamar Bezalel
5–7 March 2025	Israel; Tel Aviv	2	Amit Keinan	2	Ori Bash Dubinski
5–7 March 2025	Israel; Tel Aviv	3	Nevo Shuval	3	Noa Shweky
7–9 March 2025	Thailand; Bangkok	1	Phetphanom Panmaung	1	Natthaporn Aphimot
7–9 March 2025	Thailand; Bangkok	2	Jetsada Janluang	2	Aphitsara Srimongkhon
7–9 March 2025	Thailand; Bangkok	3	Sakchai Phodingam	3	Kanyarat Hnokaew
22–23 March 2025	United Arab Emirates; Sharjah	1	Ahmed Al Mansoori	1	
22–23 March 2025	United Arab Emirates; Sharjah	2	Jaber Al Mansoori	2	
22–23 March 2025	United Arab Emirates; Sharjah	3	Mohammed Al Mansoori	3	
22–23 March 2025	Costa Rica; San José	1	Ricardo Aguilar Garita	1	Sofía Quiros
22–23 March 2025	Costa Rica; San José	2	Nayib Leandro Madrigal	2	
22–23 March 2025	Costa Rica; San José	3	José Miguel Chacón Araya	3	
25–30 March 2025	Australia; Brisbane	1	Kurt Eather	1	Alyssa Polites
25–30 March 2025	Australia; Brisbane	2	Cameron Scott	2	Alli Anderson
25–30 March 2025	Australia; Brisbane	3	Josh Duffy	3	Nicole Duncan
2–6 April 2025	South Africa; Cape Town	1	Gustav Roller	1	Anya du Plessis
2–6 April 2025	South Africa; Cape Town	2	Ethan Kulsen	2	Danielle Van Niekerk
2–6 April 2025	South Africa; Cape Town	3	Carl Bonthuys	3	Ainslee de Beer

=== Individual Pursuit ===
Date	Venue	Podium (Men)		Podium (Women)	
3–5 January 2025	France; Loudéac	1	Louis Pijourlet	1	Marion Borras
3–5 January 2025	France; Loudéac	2	Erwan Besnier	2	Mélanie Dupin
3–5 January 2025	France; Loudéac	3	Ellande Larronde	3	Elina Cabot
10–12 January 2025	Canada; Bromont	1	Michael Foley	1	Lily Plante
10–12 January 2025	Canada; Bromont	2	Carson Mattern	2	Skyler Goudswaard
10–12 January 2025	Canada; Bromont	3	Cam Fitzmaurice	3	Ngaire Barraclough
25–26 January 2025	Belgium; Heusden-Zolder	1	Noah Vandenbranden	1	Hélène Hesters
25–26 January 2025	Belgium; Heusden-Zolder	2	Thibaut Bernard	2	Katrijn De Clercq
25–26 January 2025	Belgium; Heusden-Zolder	3	Rutger Wouters	3	Luca Vierstraete
7–9 February 2025	Slovenia; Novo Mesto	1	Nejc Komac	1	
7–9 February 2025	Slovenia; Novo Mesto	2	Maj Flajs	2	
7–9 February 2025	Slovenia; Novo Mesto	3	Mihael Štajnar	3	
21–23 February 2025	Brazil; Indaiatuba	1	Otavio Gonzeli	1	Larissa Castelari
21–23 February 2025	Brazil; Indaiatuba	2	Lauro Chaman	2	Lara Rodrigues
21–23 February 2025	Brazil; Indaiatuba	3	Diego Mendes	3	Ana Paula Finco
20–23 February 2025	Trinidad and Tobago; Couva	1	Akil Campbell	1	Teniel Campbell
20–23 February 2025	Trinidad and Tobago; Couva	2	Jadian Neaves	2	Adelle Gyan-Sootim
20–23 February 2025	Trinidad and Tobago; Couva	3	Tariq Woods	3	
21–23 February 2025	United Kingdom; Manchester	1	Josh Charlton	1	Anna Morris
21–23 February 2025	United Kingdom; Manchester	2	Michael Gill	2	Izzy Sharp
21–23 February 2025	United Kingdom; Manchester	3	William Perrett	3	Grace Lister
24 February – 1 March 2025	New Zealand; Invercargill	1	Marshall Erwood	1	McKenzie Milne
24 February – 1 March 2025	New Zealand; Invercargill	2	Lucas Murphy	2	Amelia Sykes
24 February – 1 March 2025	New Zealand; Invercargill	3	Hamish Keast	3	Mya Wolfenden
4–9 March 2025	Venezuela; San Cristóbal	1	Edwin Yair Torres	1	Katiuska García
4–9 March 2025	Venezuela; San Cristóbal	2	Clever Martínez	2	Maria Daza
4–9 March 2025	Venezuela; San Cristóbal	3	Winston Maestre	3	Verónica Abreu
5–7 March 2025	Israel; Tel Aviv	1	Alon Yogev	1	Noa Shweky
5–7 March 2025	Israel; Tel Aviv	2	Vladislav Loginov	2	Oran Herman
5–7 March 2025	Israel; Tel Aviv	3	Amit Keinan	3	
7–9 March 2025	Thailand; Bangkok	1	Patompob Phonarjthan	1	Natthaporn Aphimot
7–9 March 2025	Thailand; Bangkok	2	Sakchai Phodingam	2	Phonphitcha Khongnok
7–9 March 2025	Thailand; Bangkok	3	Thak Kaeonoi	3	Petlada Mankong
22–23 March 2025	United Arab Emirates; Sharjah	1	Mohammad Al Mutaiwei	1	
22–23 March 2025	United Arab Emirates; Sharjah	2	Saif Mayoof Al Kaabi	2	
22–23 March 2025	United Arab Emirates; Sharjah	3	Jaber Al Mansoori	3	
22–23 March 2025	Costa Rica; San José	1	Ricardo Aguilar Garita	1	
22–23 March 2025	Costa Rica; San José	2		2	
22–23 March 2025	Costa Rica; San José	3		3	
25–30 March 2025	Australia; Brisbane	1	James Moriarty	1	Alyssa Polites
25–30 March 2025	Australia; Brisbane	2	Noah Blannin	2	Claudia Marcks
25–30 March 2025	Australia; Brisbane	3	John Carter	3	Nicole Duncan
2–6 April 2025	South Africa; Cape Town	1	Jose Kleinsmit	1	Anya du Plessis
2–6 April 2025	South Africa; Cape Town	2	Tiano Da Silva	2	Danielle Van Niekerk
2–6 April 2025	South Africa; Cape Town	3	Rhys Burrell	3	

=== Keirin ===
Date	Venue	Podium (Men)		Podium (Women)	
3–5 January 2024	France; Loudéac	1	Sébastien Vigier	1	Marie-Louisa Drouode
3–5 January 2024	France; Loudéac	2	Tom Derache	2	Lou Dolez
3–5 January 2024	France; Loudéac	3	Etienne Oliviero	3	Léa Grondin
10–12 January 2025	Canada; Bromont	1	James Hedgcock	1	Lauriane Genest
10–12 January 2025	Canada; Bromont	2	Nick Wammes	2	Sarah Orban
10–12 January 2025	Canada; Bromont	3	Ryan-Shaun MacDonald	3	Emy Savard
21–23 February 2025	Brazil; Indaiatuba	1	João Vitor da Silva	1	Carolina Barbosa Alves
21–23 February 2025	Brazil; Indaiatuba	2	Flávio Cipriano	2	Maria Tereza Müller
21–23 February 2025	Brazil; Indaiatuba	3	Daniel Gruer de Brito	3	Rosimeire Alves da Silva
20–23 February 2025	Barbados; Couva (Trinidad and Tobago)	1		1	Amber Joseph
20–23 February 2025	Barbados; Couva (Trinidad and Tobago)	2		2	
20–23 February 2025	Barbados; Couva (Trinidad and Tobago)	3		3	
20–23 February 2025	Suriname; Couva (Trinidad and Tobago)	1		1	
20–23 February 2025	Suriname; Couva (Trinidad and Tobago)	2		2	
20–23 February 2025	Suriname; Couva (Trinidad and Tobago)	3		3	
20–23 February 2025	Trinidad and Tobago; Couva	1	Njisane Phillip	1	Makaira Wallace
20–23 February 2025	Trinidad and Tobago; Couva	2	Danell James	2	Alexia Wilson
20–23 February 2025	Trinidad and Tobago; Couva	3	Ryan D'Abreau	3	Phoebe Sandy
21–23 February 2025	United Kingdom; Manchester	1	Matthew Richardson	1	Lauren Bell
21–23 February 2025	United Kingdom; Manchester	2	Peter Mitchell	2	Emma Finucane
21–23 February 2025	United Kingdom; Manchester	3	Hamish Turnbull	3	Rhian Edmunds
24 February – 1 March 2025	New Zealand; Invercargill	1	Sam Dakin	1	Ellesse Andrews
24 February – 1 March 2025	New Zealand; Invercargill	2	Luke Blackwood	2	Olivia King
24 February – 1 March 2025	New Zealand; Invercargill	3	Jaxson Russell	3	Samantha Donnelly
4–9 March 2025	Venezuela; San Cristóbal	1	Andrés Torres Suárez	1	Jalymar Rodríguez
4–9 March 2025	Venezuela; San Cristóbal	2	Luis Yánez	2	Sairee Narváez
4–9 March 2025	Venezuela; San Cristóbal	3	Adamil Javier Agüero Oropeza	3	Daniela Moncada
5–7 March 2025	Israel; Tel Aviv	1	Alon Yogev	1	Noa Shweky
5–7 March 2025	Israel; Tel Aviv	2	Vladislav Loginov	2	Oran Herman
5–7 March 2025	Israel; Tel Aviv	3	Amit Keinan	3	
7–9 March 2025	Thailand; Bangkok	1	Jai Angsuthasawit	1	Aphitsara Srimongkhon
7–9 March 2025	Thailand; Bangkok	2	Phetphanom Panmaung	2	Natthaporn Aphimot
7–9 March 2025	Thailand; Bangkok	3	Norasetthada Bunma	3	Kanyarat Hnokaew
25–30 March 2025	Australia; Brisbane	1	Daniel Barber	1	Alessia McCaig
25–30 March 2025	Australia; Brisbane	2	Leigh Hoffman	2	Deneaka Blinco
25–30 March 2025	Australia; Brisbane	3	Tayte Ryan	3	Kristine Bayley
2–6 April 2025	South Africa; Cape Town	1	Mitchell Sparrow	1	Anya du Plessis
2–6 April 2025	South Africa; Cape Town	2	James Swart	2	Danielle Van Niekerk
2–6 April 2025	South Africa; Cape Town	3	Rhys Burrell	3	Joshua Wentzel

=== Omnium ===
Date	Venue	Podium (Men)		Podium (Women)	
3–5 January 2024	France; Loudéac	1	Benjamin Thomas	1	Marie Le Net
3–5 January 2024	France; Loudéac	2	Bryan Coquard	2	Elina Cabot
3–5 January 2024	France; Loudéac	3	Jean-Louis Le Ny	3	Aurore Pernollet
10–12 January 2025	Canada; Bromont	1	Michael Foley	1	Lily Plante
10–12 January 2025	Canada; Bromont	2	Chris Ernst	2	Jenna Nestman
10–12 January 2025	Canada; Bromont	3	Gabriel Seguin	3	Ngaire Barraclough
18–19 January 2025	Switzerland; Grenchen	1	Matteo Constant	1	Michelle Andres
18–19 January 2025	Switzerland; Grenchen	2	Noah Bögli	2	Jasmin Liechti
18–19 January 2025	Switzerland; Grenchen	3	Mats Poot	3	Janice Stettler
1–2 February 2025	Portugal; Sangalhos	1	João Matias	1	Daniela Campos
1–2 February 2025	Portugal; Sangalhos	2	Carlos Salgueiro	2	Beatriz Roxo
1–2 February 2025	Portugal; Sangalhos	3	Diogo Narciso	3	Patrícia Duarte
7–9 February 2025	Slovenia; Novo Mesto	1	Nejc Peterlin	1	
7–9 February 2025	Slovenia; Novo Mesto	2	Žak Eržen	2	
7–9 February 2025	Slovenia; Novo Mesto	3	Anže Skok	3	
20–23 February 2025	Barbados; Couva (Trinidad and Tobago)	1	Dominic Howard	1	
20–23 February 2025	Barbados; Couva (Trinidad and Tobago)	2		2	
20–23 February 2025	Barbados; Couva (Trinidad and Tobago)	3		3	
20–23 February 2025	Trinidad and Tobago; Couva	1	Akil Campbell	1	Teniel Campbell
20–23 February 2025	Trinidad and Tobago; Couva	2	Tariq Woods	2	Alexi Costa-Ramirez
20–23 February 2025	Trinidad and Tobago; Couva	3	Liam Trepte	3	
21–23 February 2025	Brazil; Indaiatuba	1	Lauro Chaman	1	Alice Tamirys Leite de Melo
21–23 February 2025	Brazil; Indaiatuba	2	Luan Carlos Rodrigues Silva	2	Nicolle Borges
21–23 February 2025	Brazil; Indaiatuba	3	Kacio Fonseca	3	Talita Luz Oliveira
24 February – 1 March 2025	New Zealand; Invercargill	1	James Gardner	1	Emily Shearman
24 February – 1 March 2025	New Zealand; Invercargill	2	Daniel Morton	2	Samantha Donnelly
24 February – 1 March 2025	New Zealand; Invercargill	3	Zakk Patterson	3	McKenzie Milne
4–9 March 2025	Venezuela; San Cristóbal	1	Clever Martínez	1	Verónica Abreu
4–9 March 2025	Venezuela; San Cristóbal	2	Jhonny Araujo	2	Maria Daza
4–9 March 2025	Venezuela; San Cristóbal	3	Luis Gómez	3	Fabiana Candelas
5–7 March 2025	Israel; Tel Aviv	1	Alon Yogev	1	Tamar Bezalel
5–7 March 2025	Israel; Tel Aviv	2	Vladislav Loginov	2	Noa Shweky
5–7 March 2025	Israel; Tel Aviv	3	Amit Keinan	3	
7–9 March 2025	Thailand; Bangkok	1	Thanachat Yatan	1	
7–9 March 2025	Thailand; Bangkok	2	Thak Kaeonoi	2	
7–9 March 2025	Thailand; Bangkok	3	Thanakom Jumprabhut	3	
22–23 March 2025	United Arab Emirates; Sharjah	1	Ahmed Al Mansoori	1	
22–23 March 2025	United Arab Emirates; Sharjah	2	Mohammed Alaleeli	2	
22–23 March 2025	United Arab Emirates; Sharjah	3	Khaled Mayouf	3	
22–23 March 2025	Costa Rica; San José	1	Ricardo Aguilar Garita	1	Sofía Quiros
22–23 March 2025	Costa Rica; San José	2	Darren Soto	2	
22–23 March 2025	Costa Rica; San José	3	Brayan Vargas	3	
29 March 2025	Greece; Marousi	1	Ioannis Panigyrakis	1	Argyro Milaki
29 March 2025	Greece; Marousi	2	Martinos Moutsios	2	Varvara Fasoi
29 March 2025	Greece; Marousi	3	Aristeidis Koutounis	3	Vasiliki Kokkali

=== Points Race ===
Date	Venue	Podium (Men)		Podium (Women)	
3–5 January 2024	France; Loudéac	1	Benjamin Thomas	1	Marion Borras
3–5 January 2024	France; Loudéac	2	Bryan Coquard	2	Marie Le Net
3–5 January 2024	France; Loudéac	3	Erwan Besnier	3	Aurore Pernollet
10–12 January 2025	Canada; Bromont	1	Mathias Guillemette	1	Ngaire Barraclough
10–12 January 2025	Canada; Bromont	2	Michael Foley	2	Lily Plante
10–12 January 2025	Canada; Bromont	3	Sean Richardson	3	Fiona Majendie
18–19 January 2025	Switzerland; Grenchen	1	Noah Bögli	1	Michelle Andres
18–19 January 2025	Switzerland; Grenchen	2	Matteo Constant	2	Lorena Leu
18–19 January 2025	Switzerland; Grenchen	3	Andrin Gees	3	Fabienne Buri
1–2 February 2025	Portugal; Sangalhos	1	Rui Oliveira	1	Daniela Campos
1–2 February 2025	Portugal; Sangalhos	2	Carlos Salgueiro	2	Beatriz Roxo
1–2 February 2025	Portugal; Sangalhos	3	João Matias	3	Raquel Dias
7–9 February 2025	Slovenia; Novo Mesto	1	Nejc Peterlin	1	Neža Zupanič
7–9 February 2025	Slovenia; Novo Mesto	2	Žak Eržen	2	
7–9 February 2025	Slovenia; Novo Mesto	3	Anže Skok	3	
20–23 February 2025	Barbados; Couva (Trinidad and Tobago)	1	Dominic Howard	1	
20–23 February 2025	Barbados; Couva (Trinidad and Tobago)	2		2	
20–23 February 2025	Barbados; Couva (Trinidad and Tobago)	3		3	
20–23 February 2025	Trinidad and Tobago; Couva	1	Akil Campbell	1	Alexi Costa-Ramirez
20–23 February 2025	Trinidad and Tobago; Couva	2	Jadian Neaves	2	Teniel Campbell
20–23 February 2025	Trinidad and Tobago; Couva	3	Liam Trepte	3	
21–23 February 2025	United Kingdom; Manchester	1	William Perrett	1	Katie Archibald
21–23 February 2025	United Kingdom; Manchester	2	Henry Hobbs	2	Dannielle Watkinson
21–23 February 2025	United Kingdom; Manchester	3	Ben Wiggins	3	Cat Ferguson
24 February – 1 March 2025	New Zealand; Invercargill	1	Marshall Erwood	1	Emily Shearman
24 February – 1 March 2025	New Zealand; Invercargill	2	Hamish Keast	2	Amelia Sykes
24 February – 1 March 2025	New Zealand; Invercargill	3	Daniel Morton	3	Samantha Donnelly
4–9 March 2025	Venezuela; San Cristóbal	1	Jesús Goyo	1	Fabiana Candelas
4–9 March 2025	Venezuela; San Cristóbal	2	Gabriel Carrizalez Camejo	2	Shantal Zambrano
4–9 March 2025	Venezuela; San Cristóbal	3	Yoisnerth Rondon	3	Maria Daza
5–7 March 2025	Israel; Tel Aviv	1	Alon Yogev	1	Tamar Bezalel
5–7 March 2025	Israel; Tel Aviv	2	Vladislav Loginov	2	Noa Shweky
5–7 March 2025	Israel; Tel Aviv	3	Nevo Shuval	3	
7–9 March 2025	Thailand; Bangkok	1	Thak Kaeonoi	1	Aphitsara Srimongkhon
7–9 March 2025	Thailand; Bangkok	2	Thanakom Jumprabhut	2	Natthaporn Aphimot
7–9 March 2025	Thailand; Bangkok	3	Patompob Phonarjthan	3	Kanyarat Hnokaew
22–23 March 2025	Costa Rica; San José	1	Ricardo Aguilar Garita	1	Sofía Quiros
22–23 March 2025	Costa Rica; San José	2	Darren Soto	2	
22–23 March 2025	Costa Rica; San José	3	Brayan Vargas	3	
25–30 March 2025	Australia; Brisbane	1	Rohan Haydon-Smith	1	Lauren Bates
25–30 March 2025	Australia; Brisbane	2	Declan Trezise	2	Nicole Duncan
25–30 March 2025	Australia; Brisbane	3	James Moriarty	3	Keira Will
2–6 April 2025	South Africa; Cape Town	1	Carl Bonthuys	1	Anya du Plessis
2–6 April 2025	South Africa; Cape Town	2	Kellan Gouveris	2	Danielle Van Niekerk
2–6 April 2025	South Africa; Cape Town	3	Gustav Roller	3	Ainslee de Beer

=== Scratch ===
Date	Venue	Podium (Men)		Podium (Women)	
10–12 January 2025	Canada; Bromont	1	Mathias Guillemette	1	Jenna Nestman
10–12 January 2025	Canada; Bromont	2	Cam Fitzmaurice	2	Kimberly Chen
10–12 January 2025	Canada; Bromont	3	Jonathan Hinse	3	Lily Plante
18–19 January 2025	Switzerland; Grenchen	1	Mats Poot	1	Jasmin Liechti
18–19 January 2025	Switzerland; Grenchen	2	Matteo Constant	2	Aline Seitz
18–19 January 2025	Switzerland; Grenchen	3	Alex Vogel	3	Cybèle Schneider
1–2 February 2025	Portugal; Sangalhos	1	César Martingil	1	Daniela Campos
1–2 February 2025	Portugal; Sangalhos	2	Carlos Salgueiro	2	Beatriz Roxo
1–2 February 2025	Portugal; Sangalhos	3	Daniel Dias	3	Patrícia Duarte
7–9 February 2025	Slovenia; Novo Mesto	1	Jaka Špoljar	1	Neža Zupanič
7–9 February 2025	Slovenia; Novo Mesto	2	Nejc Peterlin	2	
7–9 February 2025	Slovenia; Novo Mesto	3	Žak Eržen	3	
21–23 February 2025	Brazil; Indaiatuba	1	Lauro Chaman	1	Marcella Toldi
21–23 February 2025	Brazil; Indaiatuba	2	Luan Carlos Rodrigues Silva	2	Lara Rodrigues
21–23 February 2025	Brazil; Indaiatuba	3	Samuel Hauane Reikdal Stachera	3	Talita Luz Oliveira
20–23 February 2025	Barbados; Couva (Trinidad and Tobago)	1	Dominic Howard	1	
20–23 February 2025	Barbados; Couva (Trinidad and Tobago)	2		2	
20–23 February 2025	Barbados; Couva (Trinidad and Tobago)	3		3	
20–23 February 2025	Trinidad and Tobago; Couva	1	Liam Trepte	1	Teniel Campbell
20–23 February 2025	Trinidad and Tobago; Couva	2	Akil Campbell	2	Alexi Costa-Ramirez
20–23 February 2025	Trinidad and Tobago; Couva	3	Jadian Neaves	3	
21–23 February 2025	United Kingdom; Manchester	1	Noah Hobbs	1	Anna Morris
21–23 February 2025	United Kingdom; Manchester	2	Sam Fisher	2	Katie Archibald
21–23 February 2025	United Kingdom; Manchester	3	William Gilbank	3	Erin Boothman
24 February – 1 March 2025	New Zealand; Invercargill	1	Magnus Jamieson	1	Emily Shearman
24 February – 1 March 2025	New Zealand; Invercargill	2	Mitchel Fitzsimons	2	McKenzie Milne
24 February – 1 March 2025	New Zealand; Invercargill	3	Marshall Erwood	3	Amelia Sykes
4–9 March 2025	Venezuela; San Cristóbal	1	Luis Gómez	1	Verónica Abre
4–9 March 2025	Venezuela; San Cristóbal	2	Enríquez Díaz	2	Fabiana Candelas
4–9 March 2025	Venezuela; San Cristóbal	3	Carlos Linarez	3	Shantal Zambrano
5–7 March 2025	Israel; Tel Aviv	1	Vladislav Loginov	1	Tamar Bezalel
5–7 March 2025	Israel; Tel Aviv	2	Amit Keinan	2	Noa Shweky
5–7 March 2025	Israel; Tel Aviv	3	Nevo Shuval	3	
7–9 March 2025	Thailand; Bangkok	1	Phetphanom Panmaung	1	Natthaporn Aphimot
7–9 March 2025	Thailand; Bangkok	2	Sakchai Phodingam	2	Kanyarat Hnokaew
7–9 March 2025	Thailand; Bangkok	3	Nattapol Jumchat	3	Aphitsara Srimongkhon
22–23 March 2025	Costa Rica; San José	1	José Miguel Chacón Araya	1	Sofía Quiros
22–23 March 2025	Costa Rica; San José	2	Ricardo Aguilar Garita	2	
22–23 March 2025	Costa Rica; San José	3	Darren Soto	3	
25–30 March 2025	Australia; Brisbane	1	John Carter	1	Keira Will
25–30 March 2025	Australia; Brisbane	2	Rohan Haydon-Smith	2	Odette Lynch
25–30 March 2025	Australia; Brisbane	3	Kurt Eather	3	Alli Anderson
2–6 April 2025	South Africa; Cape Town	1	Rhys Burrell	1	Anya du Plessis
2–6 April 2025	South Africa; Cape Town	2	Gustav Roller	2	Danielle Van Niekerk
2–6 April 2025	South Africa; Cape Town	3	Bradley Gouveris	3	

=== Sprint ===
Date	Venue	Podium (Men)		Podium (Women)	
3–5 January 2024	France; Loudéac	1	Rayan Helal	1	Marie-Louisa Drouode
3–5 January 2024	France; Loudéac	2	Sébastien Vigier	2	Taky Marie-Divine Kouamé
3–5 January 2024	France; Loudéac	3	Tom Derache	3	Julie Michaux
10–12 January 2025	Canada; Bromont	1	James Hedgcock	1	Sarah Orban
10–12 January 2025	Canada; Bromont	2	Nick Wammes	2	Lauriane Genest
10–12 January 2025	Canada; Bromont	3	Ryan Dodyk	3	Emy Savard
25–26 January 2025	Belgium; Heusden-Zolder	1	Lowie Nulens	1	Valerie Jenaer
25–26 January 2025	Belgium; Heusden-Zolder	2	Runar De Schrijver	2	Zita Gheysens
25–26 January 2025	Belgium; Heusden-Zolder	3	Mathias Lefeber	3	Lore Wolfs
7–9 February 2025	Slovenia; Novo Mesto	1	Eduard Žalar	1	
7–9 February 2025	Slovenia; Novo Mesto	2	Marcel Gladek	2	
7–9 February 2025	Slovenia; Novo Mesto	3	Jaka Špoljar	3	
21–23 February 2025	Brazil; Indaiatuba	1	João Vitor da Silva	1	Carolina Barbosa Alves
21–23 February 2025	Brazil; Indaiatuba	2	Flávio Cipriano	2	Maria Tereza Müller
21–23 February 2025	Brazil; Indaiatuba	3	Daniel Gruer de Brito	3	Isabela Schuster
20–23 February 2025	Barbados; Couva (Trinidad and Tobago)	1		1	Amber Joseph
20–23 February 2025	Barbados; Couva (Trinidad and Tobago)	2		2	
20–23 February 2025	Barbados; Couva (Trinidad and Tobago)	3		3	
20–23 February 2025	Suriname; Couva (Trinidad and Tobago)	1		1	
20–23 February 2025	Suriname; Couva (Trinidad and Tobago)	2		2	
20–23 February 2025	Suriname; Couva (Trinidad and Tobago)	3		3	
20–23 February 2025	Trinidad and Tobago; Couva	1	Njisane Phillip	1	Makaira Wallace
20–23 February 2025	Trinidad and Tobago; Couva	2	Zion Pulido	2	Phoebe Sandy
20–23 February 2025	Trinidad and Tobago; Couva	3	Ryan D'Abreau	3	Alexia Wilson
21–23 February 2025	United Kingdom; Manchester	1	Matthew Richardson	1	Lauren Bell
21–23 February 2025	United Kingdom; Manchester	2	Peter Mitchell	2	Rhian Edmunds
21–23 February 2025	United Kingdom; Manchester	3	Marcus Hiley	3	Georgette Rand
24 February – 1 March 2025	New Zealand; Invercargill	1	Sam Dakin	1	Ellesse Andrews
24 February – 1 March 2025	New Zealand; Invercargill	2	Kaio Lart	2	Sophie de Vries
24 February – 1 March 2025	New Zealand; Invercargill	3	Jaxson Russell	3	Olivia King
4–9 March 2025	Venezuela; San Cristóbal	1	Adamil Javier Agüero Oropeza	1	Jalymar Elianna Rodríguez Martínez
4–9 March 2025	Venezuela; San Cristóbal	2	Alberto Andrés Torres Suárez	2	Carliany Martínez
4–9 March 2025	Venezuela; San Cristóbal	3	Luis Yáñez	3	Yoheris Peralta
7–9 March 2025	Thailand; Bangkok	1	Jai Angsuthasawit	1	Natthaporn Aphimot
7–9 March 2025	Thailand; Bangkok	2	Norasetthada Bunma	2	Kanyarat Hnokaew
7–9 March 2025	Thailand; Bangkok	3	Yeaunyong Petcharat	3	Yaowaret Jitmat
25–30 March 2025	Australia; Brisbane	1	Leigh Hoffman	1	Alessia McCaig
25–30 March 2025	Australia; Brisbane	2	Tayte Ryan	2	Sophie Watts
25–30 March 2025	Australia; Brisbane	3	Daniel Barber	3	Deneaka Blinco
2–6 April 2025	South Africa; Cape Town	1	Mitchell Sparrow	1	Amber Hindmarch
2–6 April 2025	South Africa; Cape Town	2	Tshilalahufhe Marubini Munyai	2	
2–6 April 2025	South Africa; Cape Town	3	Joshua Wentzel	3	

=== Time Trial ===
Date	Venue	Podium (Men)		Podium (Women)	
3–5 January 2024	France; Loudéac	1	Etienne Oliviero	1	Taky Marie-Divine Kouamé
3–5 January 2024	France; Loudéac	2	Rayan Helal	2	Marion Borras
3–5 January 2024	France; Loudéac	3	Tom Derache	3	Marie-Louisa Drouode
10–12 January 2025	Canada; Bromont	1	James Hedgcock	1	Sarah Orban
10–12 January 2025	Canada; Bromont	2	Ryan Dodyk	2	Lily Plante
10–12 January 2025	Canada; Bromont	3	Nick Wammes	3	Erin Watchman
25–26 January 2025	Denmark; Odense	1	Oskar Ulrik Winkler	1	
25–26 January 2025	Denmark; Odense	2	Ian Millennium	2	
25–26 January 2025	Denmark; Odense	3	Anders Fynbo	3	
25–26 January 2025	Belgium; Heusden-Zolder	1	Noah Vandenbranden	1	Marith Vanhove
25–26 January 2025	Belgium; Heusden-Zolder	2	Thibaut Bernard	2	Hélène Hesters
25–26 January 2025	Belgium; Heusden-Zolder	3	Tom Crabbe	3	Katrijn De Clercq
7–9 February 2025	Slovenia; Novo Mesto	1	Marcel Gladek	1	
7–9 February 2025	Slovenia; Novo Mesto	2	Tine Jenko	2	
7–9 February 2025	Slovenia; Novo Mesto	3	Eduard Žalar	3	
20–23 February 2025	Barbados; Couva (Trinidad and Tobago)	1		1	Amber Joseph
20–23 February 2025	Barbados; Couva (Trinidad and Tobago)	2		2	
20–23 February 2025	Barbados; Couva (Trinidad and Tobago)	3		3	
20–23 February 2025	Suriname; Couva (Trinidad and Tobago)	1		1	
20–23 February 2025	Suriname; Couva (Trinidad and Tobago)	2		2	
20–23 February 2025	Suriname; Couva (Trinidad and Tobago)	3		3	
20–23 February 2025	Trinidad and Tobago; Couva	1	Syndel Samaroo	1	Teniel Campbell
20–23 February 2025	Trinidad and Tobago; Couva	2	Raul Luis Garcia	2	Makaira Wallace
20–23 February 2025	Trinidad and Tobago; Couva	3	Josiah Williams	3	Phoebe Sandy
21–23 February 2025	Brazil; Indaiatuba	1	João Vitor da Silva	1	Maria Tereza Müller
21–23 February 2025	Brazil; Indaiatuba	2	Kacio Fonseca	2	Lara Rodrigues
21–23 February 2025	Brazil; Indaiatuba	3	Ricardo Alafim Freitas	3	Amanda Kunkel
24 February – 1 March 2025	New Zealand; Invercargill	1	Sam Dakin	1	Ellesse Andrews
24 February – 1 March 2025	New Zealand; Invercargill	2	Zakk Patterson	2	Amelia Sykes
24 February – 1 March 2025	New Zealand; Invercargill	3	Magnus Jamieson	3	McKenzie Milne
4–9 March 2025	Venezuela; San Cristóbal	1	Luis Yáñez	1	Raybeli Moreno
4–9 March 2025	Venezuela; San Cristóbal	2	Moises Ramos Cedillo	2	Yoheris Peralta
4–9 March 2025	Venezuela; San Cristóbal	3	Adamil Javier Agüero Oropeza	3	Carliany Martínez
5–7 March 2025	Israel; Tel Aviv	1	Ilay Argov	1	Adi Tene
5–7 March 2025	Israel; Tel Aviv	2	Guy Beer	2	
5–7 March 2025	Israel; Tel Aviv	3	Dvir Lavi	3	
7–9 March 2025	Thailand; Bangkok	1	Phetphanom Panmaung	1	Aphitsara Srimongkhon
7–9 March 2025	Thailand; Bangkok	2	Norasetthada Bunma	2	Natthaporn Aphimot
7–9 March 2025	Thailand; Bangkok	3	Yeaunyong Petcharat	3	Kanyarat Hnokaew
25–30 March 2025	Australia; Brisbane	1	Tayte Ryan	1	Claudia Marcks
25–30 March 2025	Australia; Brisbane	2	Finn Carpenter	2	Alessia McCaig
25–30 March 2025	Australia; Brisbane	3	John Carter	3	Nicole Duncan
2–6 April 2025	South Africa; Cape Town	1	Ethan Kulsen	1	Anya du Plessis
2–6 April 2025	South Africa; Cape Town	2	James Swart	2	Danielle Van Niekerk
2–6 April 2025	South Africa; Cape Town	3	Douglas Abbot	3	Amber Hindmarch

=== Madison ===
Date	Venue	Podium (Men)		Podium (Women)	
3–5 January 2024	France; Loudéac	1	Benjamin Thomas; Bryan Coquard	1	Marion Borras; Flavie Boulais
3–5 January 2024	France; Loudéac	2	Erwan Besnier; Mathieu Dupé	2	Marie Le Net; Clémence Chéreau
3–5 January 2024	France; Loudéac	3	Louis Pijourlet; Dorian Carreau	3	Léonie Mahieu; Aurore Pernollet
10–12 January 2025	Canada; Bromont	1	Chris Ernst; Mathias Guillemette	1	Lily Plante; Ngaire Barraclough
10–12 January 2025	Canada; Bromont	2	Campbell Parrish; Cam Fitzmaurice	2	Fiona Majendie; Jenna Nestman
10–12 January 2025	Canada; Bromont	3	Zach Webster; Sean Richardson	3	Kimberly Chen; Anabelle Thomas
1–2 February 2025	Portugal; Sangalhos	1	João Matias; Rui Oliveira	1	
1–2 February 2025	Portugal; Sangalhos	2	Carlos Salgueiro; Diogo Narciso	2	
1–2 February 2025	Portugal; Sangalhos	3	João Martins; Daniel Dias	3	
7–9 February 2025	Slovenia; Novo Mesto	1	Žak Eržen; Nejc Peterlin	1	
7–9 February 2025	Slovenia; Novo Mesto	2	Vid Murn; Jaka Špoljar	2	
7–9 February 2025	Slovenia; Novo Mesto	3	Anže Skok; Tilen Finkšt	3	
21–23 February 2025	Brazil; Indaiatuba	1	Armando Camargo; Luan Carlos Rodrigues Silva	1	Nicolle Borges; Talita Luz Oliveira
21–23 February 2025	Brazil; Indaiatuba	2	Peterson Senegaglea; Thalles José Degli Esposti Fernandes	2	Alice Melo; Ana Paula Finco
21–23 February 2025	Brazil; Indaiatuba	3	Luiz Henrique Inácio; Rodrigo Rigonato Reami	3	Ana Casetta; Debora Moura
24 February – 1 March 2025	New Zealand; Invercargill	1	Daniel Morton; Magnus Jamieson	1	Emily Shearman; Samantha Donnelly
24 February – 1 March 2025	New Zealand; Invercargill	2	Hamish Keast; Mitchel Fitzsimons	2	Amelia Sykes; Mya Wolfenden
24 February – 1 March 2025	New Zealand; Invercargill	3	Lucas Murphy; Zakk Patterson	3	Hannah Bayard; McKenzie Milne
4–9 March 2025	Venezuela; San Cristóbal	1	Yoisnerth Rondon; Clever Martínez	1	Shantal Zambrano; Andreina Bohórquez
4–9 March 2025	Venezuela; San Cristóbal	2	Jhonny Araujo; Julio César Blanco	2	Anabell Medina; Wilmarys Pacheco
4–9 March 2025	Venezuela; San Cristóbal	3	Edwin Yair Torres; Enríquez Díaz	3	Daniela Moncada; Raybeli Moreno
5–7 March 2025	Israel; Tel Aviv	1	Alon Yogev; Vladislav Loginov	1	
5–7 March 2025	Israel; Tel Aviv	2	Amit Keinan; Nevo Shuval	2	
5–7 March 2025	Israel; Tel Aviv	3	Oron Argov; Ilay Argov	3	
2–6 April 2025	South Africa; Cape Town	1	Daniyal Matthews; Gustav Roller	1	
2–6 April 2025	South Africa; Cape Town	2	Rhys Burrell; Jose Kleinsmit	2	
2–6 April 2025	South Africa; Cape Town	3	Alex Heward; Carl Bonthuys	3	

=== Team Sprint ===
Date	Venue	Podium (Men)		Podium (Women)	
10–12 January 2025	Canada; Bromont	1	Nickolas Ridge; Ryan-Shaun MacDonald; Michael Girolametto-Prosen	1	Emy Savard; Parmis Rabet; Thalia Krauth-Ibarz
10–12 January 2025	Canada; Bromont	2	Sean Blaney; Taylor Duffy; Cameron King Gillis	2	Anne-Marie Dumont; Meika Ellis; Tendo Mukahanana
10–12 January 2025	Canada; Bromont	3	Fergus Spitzley; Marius Bélisle; Charles Perreault	3	
7–9 February 2025	Slovenia; Novo Mesto	1	Tilen Finkšt; Anže Skok; Nejc Peterlin	1	
7–9 February 2025	Slovenia; Novo Mesto	2	Nejc Komac; Marcel Gladek; Maj Flajs	2	
7–9 February 2025	Slovenia; Novo Mesto	3	Jaka Špoljar; Vid Murn; Nik Golob	3	
21–23 February 2025	Brazil; Indaiatuba	1	João Vitor da Silva; Daniel Gruer de Brito; Mauro Aquino	1	Ana Júlia Santos Alves; Maria Tereza Müller; Thayná Araujo
21–23 February 2025	Brazil; Indaiatuba	2	Arthur Joner Gobbi; Fernando Sikora Jr. Vinicius Gussolli	2	Catharine Ehrmann; Emanuelle Broniski Viximiczen; Leticia Schuster
21–23 February 2025	Brazil; Indaiatuba	3	Franklin Almeida; Leandro Larmelina; Matheus Fudisaki	3	Maria Julia da Silva Vieira; Rosemeire Alves da Silva; Caroline Borges
20–23 February 2025	Trinidad and Tobago; Couva	1		1	
20–23 February 2025	Trinidad and Tobago; Couva	2		2	
20–23 February 2025	Trinidad and Tobago; Couva	3		3	
21–23 February 2025	United Kingdom; Manchester	1	Lyall Craig; Harry Ledingham-Horn; Niall Monks; Matthew Richardson	1	Lauren Bell; Rhian Edmunds; Lowri Thomas
21–23 February 2025	United Kingdom; Manchester	2	Marcus Hiley; Ed Lowe; Oliver Pettifer	2	Iona Moir; Rhianna Parris-Smith; Georgette Rand
21–23 February 2025	United Kingdom; Manchester	3	Alistair Fielding; Hayden Norris; Harry Radford; Hamish Turnbull	3	Amy Cole; Bronwen Howard-Rees; Eve James; Evelyn Tedaldi
24 February – 1 March 2025	New Zealand; Invercargill	1	Luke Blackwood; Jack Gerken; Louis Vuleta	1	Sophie de Vries; Erin Green; Mikaela MacDonald
24 February – 1 March 2025	New Zealand; Invercargill	2	Kaio Lart; Ryan Hansen; Jaxson Russell	2	
24 February – 1 March 2025	New Zealand; Invercargill	3	Jared Mann; Daniel Shepherd; Edward Sims	3	
7–9 March 2025	Thailand; Bangkok	1	Norasetthada Bunma; Nonthasak Raksasri; Jai Angsuthasawit; Thanawut Sanikwathi	1	
7–9 March 2025	Thailand; Bangkok	2	Yeaunyong Petcharat; Phetphanom Panmaung; Narongdat Sangchai; Jakkaphan Janwatsiri	2	
7–9 March 2025	Thailand; Bangkok	3	Wachirawit Saenkhamwong; Jaturong Niwanti; Wiriya Yapa; Muncheth Faimuenvai	3	
22–23 March 2025	Costa Rica; San José	1	José Miguel Chacón Araya; Danilo Sibaja; Nayib Leandro Madrigal	1	
22–23 March 2025	Costa Rica; San José	2		2	
22–23 March 2025	Costa Rica; San José	3		3	
24 March 2025	Israel; Tel Aviv	1	Frank Shaked; Vladislav Loginov; Mikhail Iakovlev	1	Aviv Dunsky; Noa Shweky; Tamar Bezalel
24 March 2025	Israel; Tel Aviv	2	Slava Dubinski; Yuval Ben-Mordechai; Itamar Malchi	2	
24 March 2025	Israel; Tel Aviv	3		3	
25–30 March 2025	Australia; Brisbane	1	Maxwell Liebeknecht; Tayte Ryan; Leigh Hoffman	1	Ella Liang; Deneaka Blinco; Emma Stevens
25–30 March 2025	Australia; Brisbane	2	Noah Mason; Xavier Bland; John Trovas	2	Victoria Smith; Maddison Smith; Molly McGill
25–30 March 2025	Australia; Brisbane	3	Nikolas Papadakis; Jade Maddern; Sam Gallagher	3	Maya Dillon; Liliya Tatarinoff; Lauren Perry
2–6 April 2025	South Africa; Cape Town	1	Ethan Kulsen; Joshua Wentzel; Mitchell Sparrow	1	
2–6 April 2025	South Africa; Cape Town	2	Gustav Roller; Tshilalahufhe Marubini Munyai; Douglas Abbot	2	
2–6 April 2025	South Africa; Cape Town	3	Kellan Gouveris; Bradley Gouveris; James Swart	3	

=== Team Pursuit ===
Date	Venue	Podium (Men)		Podium (Women)	
3–5 January 2024	France; Loudéac	1	Léo Busson; Nathan Marcoux; Camille Charret; Jules Friot	1	Clémence Chéreau; Léonie Mahieu; Ilona Rouat; Marie Le Net; Aurore Pernollet
3–5 January 2024	France; Loudéac	2	Nathanaël Boutron; Dorian Carreau; Guillaume Monmasson; Louis Pijourlet; Christophe Brioux	2	Mélanie Dupin; Marine Maugé; Kristina Nenadović; Léane Tabu
3–5 January 2024	France; Loudéac	3	Gatien Le Rousseau; Alessio Gombaud; Maximilien Hamonic; Septime Le Normand Lucas	3	Constance Marchand; Elina Cabot; Lou Dolez; Maylia Masset
7–9 February 2025	Slovenia; Novo Mesto	1	Nejc Komac; Marcel Gladek; Maj Flajs; Grega Podlesnik	1	
7–9 February 2025	Slovenia; Novo Mesto	2	Tilen Finkšt; Anže Skok; Nejc Peterlin; Vid Murn	2	
7–9 February 2025	Slovenia; Novo Mesto	3	Mihael Štajnar; Jure Medved; Domen Oblak; Tine Jenko	3	
20–23 February 2025	Trinidad and Tobago; Couva	1		1	
20–23 February 2025	Trinidad and Tobago; Couva	2		2	
20–23 February 2025	Trinidad and Tobago; Couva	3		3	
21–23 February 2025	Brazil; Indaiatuba	1	Armando Camargo; Endrigo da Rosa; Luan Carlos Rodrigues Silva; Diego Mendes; Edson Antonio Ponciano	1	Ana Paula Polegatch; Carolina Barbosa Alves; Larissa Castelari; Marcella Toldi
21–23 February 2025	Brazil; Indaiatuba	2	Kacio Fonseca; Matheus Constantino; Otavio Gonzeli; Felipe Cristiano da Paixão Marques; Rafael Augusto de Paula	2	Alice Melo; Amanda Kunkel; Ana Paula Finco; Ana Carolina Ribeiro Leal; Thayná Araujo
21–23 February 2025	Brazil; Indaiatuba	3	Cristian Egídio; Flávio Cipriano; Werik Kaua Domingos; Samuel Hauane Reikdal Stachera	3	Gisele Gasparotto; Lara Rodrigues; Nicolle Borges; Talita Luz Oliveira
24 February – 1 March 2025	New Zealand; Invercargill	1	Hamish Keast; Oliver Clark; Andre Free; Jesse Johnston	1	Amelia Sykes; Mya Wolfenden; Shaylah Sayers; Jesse Thomson
24 February – 1 March 2025	New Zealand; Invercargill	2	James Gardner; Hunter Gough; Joshua Grieve; Luca Sanders	2	Hannah Bayard; Tegan Feringa; Nina Worrall; Hannah Paine
24 February – 1 March 2025	New Zealand; Invercargill	3	Liam Ramsey; Jonathan Blyth; Zachary Woollett; Hamish Wallace	3	Eliana Beale; Mikaela MacDonald; McKenzie Milne; Lucy Griffin
4–9 March 2025	Venezuela; San Cristóbal	1	Edwin Yair Torres; Franklin Chacón; Antoni Samuel Quintero; Enríquez Díaz	1	
4–9 March 2025	Venezuela; San Cristóbal	2	Jhonny Araujo; Enmanuel Viloria; Julio César Blanco; Arley Cuadros	2	
4–9 March 2025	Venezuela; San Cristóbal	3	Oscar Noguera; Cesar Padilla; Leomar Briceño; Jaiker Yosue Morillo	3	
7–9 March 2025	Thailand; Bangkok	1	Jetsada Janluang; Patompob Phonarjthan; Phurit Rodvilai; Thanawut Sanikwathi; Setthawut Yordsuwan	1	
7–9 March 2025	Thailand; Bangkok	2	Sakchai Phodingam; Kanokphan Keo-ngam-Aroon; Thanachat Yatan; Pongpol Amornpiyakrit; Aukkrit Nomai	2	
7–9 March 2025	Thailand; Bangkok	3	Phuwadol Kotprom; Orrachun Petcharat; Tanayut Pahuan; Pornmanas Wattanapreeda; Wanchana Thampanya	3	
24 March 2025	Israel; Tel Aviv	1	Noam Haim; Benjamin Vaniche; Or Dayan; Vladislav Loginov	1	Aviv Dunsky; Noa Shweky; Tamar Bezalel
24 March 2025	Israel; Tel Aviv	2	Pinhas Levi; Slava Dubinski; Yuval Ben-Mordechai	2	
24 March 2025	Israel; Tel Aviv	3		3	
25–30 March 2025	Australia; Brisbane	1	Noah Blannin; Rohan Haydon-Smith; James Moriarty; Declan Trezise	1	Nicole Duncan; Keira Will; Isla Carr; Sally Carter
25–30 March 2025	Australia; Brisbane	2	William Cooper; Dylan Eather; Kurt Eather; Cameron Scott	2	Summer Nordmeyer; Alli Anderson; Odette Lynch; Katelyn Nicholson
25–30 March 2025	Australia; Brisbane	3	Lawson Franzmann; Mitchell McGovern; Dylan Proctor-Parker; Logan Taplin	3	
2–6 April 2025	South Africa; Cape Town	1	Bradley Gouveris; Kellan Gouveris; Rhys Burrell; Jose Kleinsmit	1	
2–6 April 2025	South Africa; Cape Town	2	Alex Heward; Carl Bonthuys; Daniyal Matthews; Joshua Louw	2	
2–6 April 2025	South Africa; Cape Town	3	Douglas Abbot; Gustav Roller; Chris Jooste; Butiki Ndebele	3	
