= List of Japanese records in track cycling =

The following are the national records in track cycling in Japan maintained by the Japan Cycling Federation.

== Men ==
Key to tables: Awaiting ratification Record not kept by Japan Cycling Federation Not ratified or later rescinded by the Japan Cycling Federation

Event	Record	Athlete	Date	Meet	Place	Ref
Flying 200 m time trial	9.348	Kaiya Ota	29 March 2026	Asian Championships	Tagaytay, Philippines	
250m time trial (standing start)	17.217	Yoshitaku Nagasako	14 March 2025	Nations Cup	Konya, Turkey	
500 m time trial	31.909	Seiichiro Nakagawa	7 December 2013	World Cup	Aguascalientes, Mexico	
1km time trial	59.796	Yuta Obara	14 October 2022	World Championships	Saint-Quentin-en-Yvelines, France	
Team sprint (750 m)	42.007	Yoshitaku Nagasako; Yuta Obara; Kaiya Ota	14 March 2025	Nations Cup	Konya, Turkey	
4000m individual pursuit	4:08.669	Kazushige Kuboki	23 February 2025	Asian Championships	Nilai, Malaysia	
4000m team pursuit	3:48.127	Naoki Kojima; Eiya Hashimoto; Kazushige Kuboki; Shoi Matsuda	15 March 2024	Nations Cup	Hong Kong	
Hour record	52.468 km	Shunsuke Imamura	23 November 2020		Izu, Japan	

== Women ==
Event	Record	Athlete	Date	Meet	Place	Ref
Flying 200m time trial	10.170	Mina Sato	15 March 2025	Nations Cup	Konya, Turkey	
250 m time trial (standing start)	18.989	Aki Sakai	29 September 2026	Asian Games	Izu, Japan	
500m time trial	34.273	Aki Sakai	19 June 2023	Asian Championships	Nilai, Malaysia	
1km time trial	1:08.579	Yumi Kajihara	15 June 2026	Japanese Championships	Izu, Japan	
1km time trial	1:07.913	Maho Kakita	31 March 2026	Asian Championships	Tagaytay, Philippines	
Team sprint (500 m)	33.785	Riyu Ohta; Kayono Maeda	16 February 2018	Asian Championships	Nilai, Malaysia	
Team sprint (750 m)	47.650	Mina Sato; Aki Sakai; Haruka Nakazawa	22 August 2025	Japanese Championships	Izu, Japan	
3000m individual pursuit	3:28.122	Maho Kakita	9 September 2024	Japanese Championships	Izu, Japan	
4000m individual pursuit	4:41.227	Tsuyaka Uchino	25 August 2025	Japanese Championships	Izu, Japan	
4000m individual pursuit	4:40.679	Tsuyaka Uchino	28 March 2026	Asian Championships	Tagaytay, Philippines	
3000m team pursuit	3:31.165	Kanako Kase; Maki Tabata; Minami Uwano	5 April 2012	World Championships	Melbourne, Australia	
4000m team pursuit	4:13.818	Yumi Kajihara; Tsuyaka Uchino; Mizuki Ikeda; Maho Kakita	6 August 2024	Olympic Games	Saint-Quentin-en-Yvelines, France	
4000m team pursuit	4:10.424	Mizuki Ikeda; Yumi Kajihara; Maho Kakita; Tsuyaka Uchino	30 September 2026	Asian Games	Izu, Japan	
Hour record	44.304 km	Maho Kakita	19 September 2025		Izu, Japan	
