= Cycling at the 2026 Asian Games – Women's madison =

Women's madison at the 2026 Asian Games
- Venue: Izu Velodrome
- Dates: 2 October 2026
- Competitors: 22 from 11 nations

Medalists
gold medal	Maho Kakita; Tsuyaka Uchino	Japan
silver medal	Lee Sze Wing; Leung Wing Yee	Hong Kong
bronze medal	Chen Ning; Gong Xianbing	China

The women's keirin event at the 2026 Asian Games was held on 2 October 2026.

== Schedule ==
All times are Japan Standard Time (UTC+09:00)

Date	Time	Event
Friday, 2 October 2026	15:46	Finals

== Results ==
Legend

- DNF — Did not finish

Rank	Team	Sprint												Laps		Total	Finish order
Rank	Team	1	2	3	4	5	6	7	8	9	10	11	12	+	−	Total	Finish order
1st place, gold medalist(s)	Japan (JPN); Maho Kakita; Tsuyaka Uchino	5	5	5	3	5	5	5	5	5	3	5	2			53	4
2nd place, silver medalist(s)	Hong Kong (HKG); Lee Sze Wing; Leung Wing Yee	2	2	2	2	3	2	2	3	3	1	3	6			31	2
3rd place, bronze medalist(s)	China (CHN); Chen Ning; Gong Xianbing	3	3	3	5	1	3			1	5	2	4			30	3
4	South Korea (KOR); Shin Ji-eun; Jang Su-ji	1	1	1		2	1	3	2	2	2	1	10			26	1
5	Singapore (SGP); Valencia Tan; Elizabeth Liau								1						20	–19	5
6	Chinese Taipei (TPE); Huang Ting-ying; Zeng Ke-xin				1										20	–19	7
7	Uzbekistan (UZB); Samira Ismailova; Asal Rizaeva							1							40	–39	6
8	India (IND); Harshita Jakhar; Swasti Singh															DNF	
