= Cycling at the 2022 Asian Games – Women's team pursuit =

Women's team pursuit at the 2022 Asian Games
- Venue: Chun'an Jieshou Sports Centre Velodrome
- Dates: 26–27 September 2023
- Competitors: 26 from 6 nations

Medalists
gold medal	Japan; Yumi Kajihara, Mizuki Ikeda, Tsuyaka Uchino, Maho Kakita
silver medal	China; Wang Susu, Wei Suwan, Wang Xiaoyue, Zhang Hongjie
bronze medal	Hong Kong; Lee Sze Wing, Yang Qianyu, Leung Bo Yee, Leung Wing Yee

The women's team pursuit event at the 2022 Asian Games was held on 26 and 27 September 2023.

== Schedule ==
All times are China Standard Time (UTC+08:00)

Date	Time	Event
Tuesday, 26 September 2023	10:48	Qualifying
Tuesday, 26 September 2023	15:24	First round
Wednesday, 27 September 2023	15:30	Finals

== Records ==
Prior to this competition, the existing world, Asian and Games records were as follows.

World Record	Germany	4:04.242	Tokyo, Japan	3 August 2021
Asian Record	Japan	4:18.510	Jakarta, Indonesia	24 February 2023
Games Record	South Korea	4:23.652	Jakarta, Indonesia	28 August 2018

== Results ==
=== Qualifying ===
Rank	Team	Time	Notes
1	Japan (JPN); Yumi Kajihara; Mizuki Ikeda; Tsuyaka Uchino; Maho Kakita	4:26.932	
2	China (CHN); Wang Susu; Wei Suwan; Wang Xiaoyue; Zhang Hongjie	4:26.967	
3	South Korea (KOR); Song Min-ji; Na Ah-reum; Lee Ju-mi; Shin Jie-un	4:30.970	
4	Hong Kong (HKG); Lee Sze Wing; Yang Qianyu; Leung Bo Yee; Leung Wing Yee	4:34.009	
5	Uzbekistan (UZB); Nafosat Kozieva; Margarita Misyurina; Yanina Kuskova; Olga Zabelinskaya	4:39.539	
6	Kazakhstan (KAZ); Akpeiil Ossim; Marina Kuzmina; Violetta Kazakova; Anzhela Solovyeva	4:51.225	

=== First round ===
==== Heat 1 ====
Rank	Team	Time	Notes
1	Uzbekistan (UZB); Sofiya Karimova; Margarita Misyurina; Yanina Kuskova; Olga Zabelinskaya	4:34.451	
2	Kazakhstan (KAZ); Marina Kuzmina; Akpeiil Ossim; Violetta Kazakova; Anzhela Solovyeva	4:46.698	

==== Heat 2 ====
Rank	Team	Time	Notes
1	China (CHN); Wang Susu; Wei Suwan; Wang Xiaoyue; Zhang Hongjie	4:22.549	GR
2	South Korea (KOR); Kang Hyun-kyung; Na Ah-reum; Lee Ju-mi; Shin Jie-un	4:29.228	

==== Heat 2 ====
Rank	Team	Time	Notes
1	Japan (JPN); Yumi Kajihara; Mizuki Ikeda; Tsuyaka Uchino; Maho Kakita	Overtaking	
2	Hong Kong (HKG); Lee Sze Wing; Yang Qianyu; Leung Bo Yee; Leung Wing Yee	4:33.363	

==== Summary ====
Rank	Team	Time
3	South Korea (KOR)	4:29.228
4	Hong Kong (HKG)	4:33.363
5	Uzbekistan (UZB)	4:34.451
6	Kazakhstan (KAZ)	4:46.698

=== Finals ===
==== Bronze ====
Rank	Team	Time	Notes
3rd place, bronze medalist(s)	Hong Kong (HKG); Lee Sze Wing; Yang Qianyu; Leung Bo Yee; Leung Wing Yee	4:28.888	
4	South Korea (KOR); Kang Hyun-kyung; Na Ah-reum; Lee Ju-mi; Song Min-ji	4:30.158	

==== Gold ====
Rank	Team	Time	Notes
1st place, gold medalist(s)	Japan (JPN); Yumi Kajihara; Mizuki Ikeda; Tsuyaka Uchino; Maho Kakita	4:21.224	GR
2nd place, silver medalist(s)	China (CHN); Wang Susu; Wei Suwan; Wang Xiaoyue; Zhang Hongjie	4:21.285	
