= Cycling at the 2026 Asian Games – Women's team pursuit =

Women's team pursuit at the 2026 Asian Games
- Venue: Izu Velodrome
- Dates: 29–30 September 2026
- Competitors: 23 from 5 nations

Medalists
gold medal	China; Chen Ning; Gong Xianbing; Wang Xiaoyue; Wei Suwan; Yuan Haidi
silver medal	Japan; Mizuki Ikeda; Yumi Kajihara; Maho Kakita; Tsuyaka Uchino; Misaki Okamoto
bronze medal	South Korea; Jang Su-ji; Kim Min-jeong; Noh Yun-seo; Shin Jie-un; Park Do-young

The women's team pursuit event at the 2026 Asian Games was held on 29 and 30 September 2026.

== Schedule ==
All times are Japan Standard Time (UTC+09:00)

Date	Time	Event
Tuesday, 29 September 2026	10:42	Qualifying
Tuesday, 29 September 2026	15:24	First round
Wednesday, 30 September 2026	15:28	Finals

== Records ==
Prior to this competition, the existing world, Asian and Games records were as follows.

World Record	United Kingdom	4:02.808	Konya, Turkey	2 February 2026
Asian Record	China	4:09.438	Tagaytay, Philippines	25 March 2026
Games Record	Japan	4:21.224	Hangzhou, China	27 September 2023

== Results ==
Legend

- OVL — Overlapped
- Overtaking — Caught and passed the opposing team

=== Qualifying ===
The five fastest teams will qualify and be matched in the First Round as follows:

- The 5th fastest team start alone against the clock.
- The 2nd fastest team against the 3rd fastest team.
- The fastest team against the 4th fastest team.

Rank	Team	Time	Notes
1	Japan (JPN); Mizuki Ikeda; Yumi Kajihara; Maho Kakita; Tsuyaka Uchino	4:14.496	GR
2	China (CHN); Gong Xianbing; Chen Ning; Wang Xiaoyue; Wei Suwan	4:16.766	
3	South Korea (KOR); Kim Min-jeong; Park Do-young; Noh Yun-seo; Shin Jie-un	4:30.311	
4	Uzbekistan (UZB); Nafosat Kozieva; Samira Ismailova; Yanina Kuskova; Asal Rizaeva	4:38.152	
5	India (IND); Harshita Jakhar; Pooja Baban Danole; Meenakshi; Swasti Singh	4:45.151	

=== First round ===
Progression rule:

- The winners of heats 2 and 3 in the First Round ride the final for the gold and silver medals.
- The remaining three teams will be ranked by their times in the First Round and will be paired as follows:
- The two fastest teams ride the final for the bronze medal.

==== Heat 1 ====
Rank	Team	Time	Notes
1	India (IND); Harshita Jakhar; Pooja Baban Danole; Meenakshi; Swasti Singh	4:46.950	

==== Heat 2 ====
Rank	Team	Time	Notes
1	China (CHN); Gong Xianbing; Yuan Haidi; Wang Xiaoyue; Wei Suwan	Overtaking	QG
2	South Korea (KOR); Kim Min-jeong; Jang Su-ji; Noh Yun-seo; Shin Jie-un	4:25.711	QB

==== Heat 3 ====
Rank	Team	Time	Notes
1	Japan (JPN); Mizuki Ikeda; Misaki Okamoto; Maho Kakita; Tsuyaka Uchino	Overtaking	QG
2	Uzbekistan (UZB); Nafosat Kozieva; Samira Ismailova; Yanina Kuskova; Asal Rizaeva	4:36.113	QB

=== Finals ===
==== Bronze ====
Rank	Team	Time	Notes
3rd place, bronze medalist(s)	South Korea (KOR); Kim Min-jeong; Jang Su-ji; Noh Yun-seo; Shin Jie-un	Overtaking	
4	Uzbekistan (UZB); Nafosat Kozieva; Samira Ismailova; Yanina Kuskova; Asal Rizaeva	OVL	

==== Gold ====
Rank	Team	Time	Notes
1st place, gold medalist(s)	China (CHN); Gong Xianbing; Chen Ning; Wang Xiaoyue; Wei Suwan	4:08.818	GR
2nd place, silver medalist(s)	Japan (JPN); Mizuki Ikeda; Yumi Kajihara; Maho Kakita; Tsuyaka Uchino	4:10.424	
