= Song Min-ji =

South Korean Cyclist

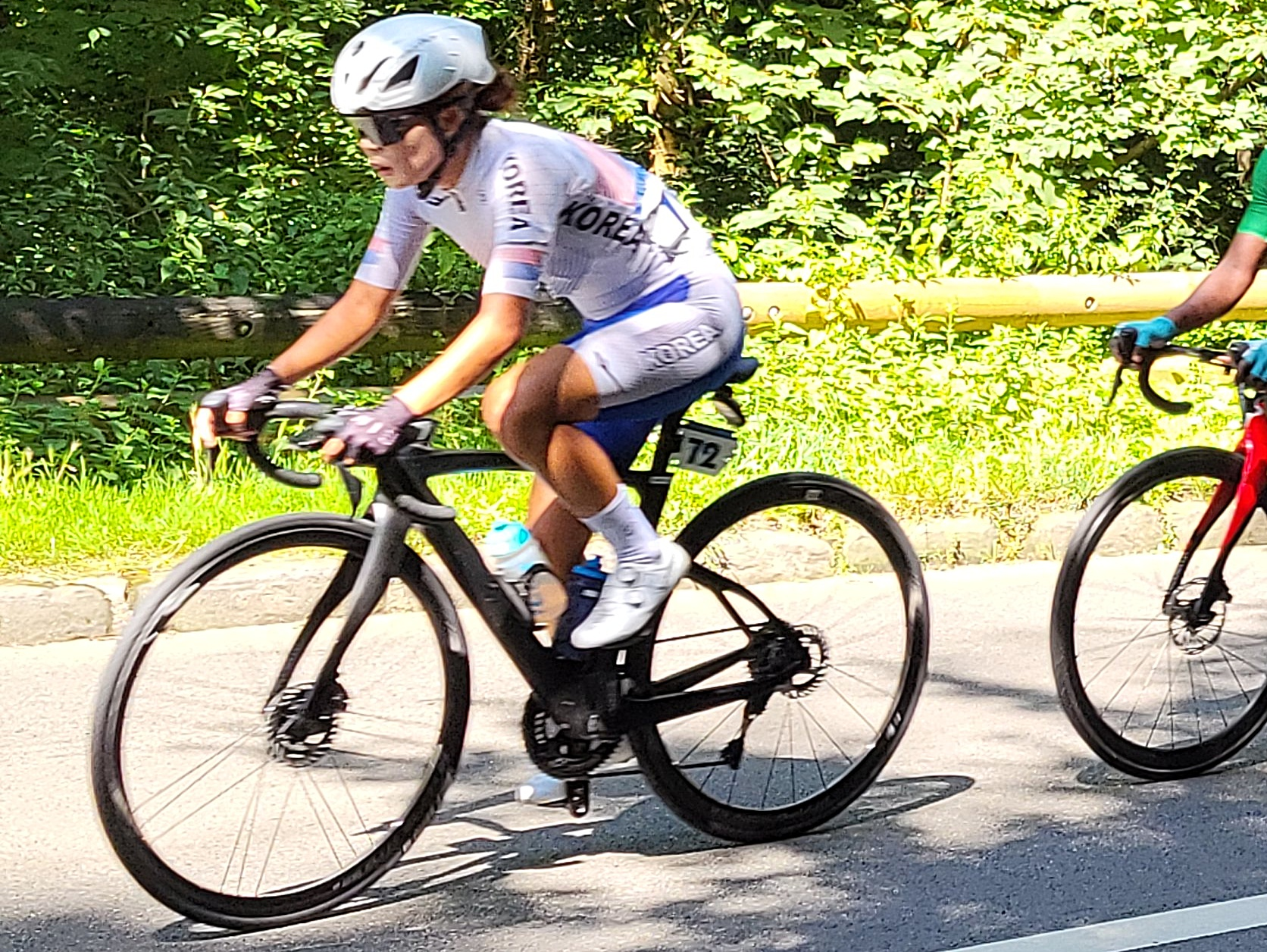
- Song at the 2024 Summer Olympics

Personal information
- Born: 30 March 1998 (age 28)

Cycling career
- Sport: Cycling
- Current team: Samyang Women's Cycling Team
- Discipline: road
- Role: Rider

Amateur team
- 2021–: Samyang Women's Cycling Team
Medal record
Representing South Korea
Women's road cycling
Asian Championships
Gold medal – first place	2024 Almaty	Road race
Women's track cycling
Asian Championships
Silver medal – second place	2025 Nilai	Team pursuit
Bronze medal – third place	2024 New Delhi	Team pursuit

Song Min-ji (Korean: 송민지; born 30 March 1998) is a South Korean road and track cyclist who currently competes for amateur team Samyang Women's Cycling Team. She competed primarily in South Korea for her junior career, only moving to international events beginning in 2023. Song competed in the 2022 Asian Games (held in 2023 due to delays) in the team pursuit. She found international success in 2024, winning the Asian Road Cycling Championship road race event and winning a bronze medal in the team pursuit at the Asian Track Cycling Championships.

Song was selected to represent South Korea at the 2024 Summer Olympics in the road race based on her UCI points ranking. Song participated, but did not finish the race.

== Major results ==
=== Road ===
2017
3rd Time trial, National Championships
2018
3rd Time trial, National Championships
2019
5th Time trial, National Championships
2022
5th Road race, National Championships
2023
2nd Road race, National Championships
2024
1st Road race, Asian Championships
2nd Road race, National Championships

=== Track ===
2023
4th Team pursuit, Asian Games
2024
Asian Championships

3rd Team pursuit
4th Madison
