= Mizuki Ikeda =

Japanese cyclist (born 2004)

Personal information
- Born: 6 August 2004 (age 22) Ōnojō, Japan

Cycling career
- Sport: Cycling
- Discipline: Track cycling
- Role: Rider

Professional team
- 2023–: Team Rakuten K Dreams
Medal record
Representing Japan
Women's track cycling
Asian Games
Gold medal – first place	2022 Hangzhou	Team pursuit
Silver medal – second place	2026 Aichi–Nagoya	Team pursuit
Asian Championships
Gold medal – first place	2023 Nilai	Team pursuit
Gold medal – first place	2024 New Delhi	Team pursuit
Gold medal – first place	2025 Nilai	Team pursuit
Gold medal – first place	2025 Nilai	Omnium
Gold medal – first place	2026 Tagaytay	Madison
Silver medal – second place	2026 Tagaytay	Team pursuit
Bronze medal – third place	2023 Nilai	Points race
Bronze medal – third place	2024 New Delhi	Scratch
World Junior Championships
Silver medal – second place	2022 Tel Aviv	Madison
Women's road bicycle racing
Asian Championships
Silver medal – second place	2025 Phitsanulok	Mixed team relay

Mizuki Ikeda (池田瑞紀, Ikeda Mizuki; born 6 August 2004) is a Japanese racing cyclist who represents Team Rakuten K Dreams at professional level and the Japanese national cycling team. She is also active in Japan as a keirin cyclist

== Career ==
Ikeda a native of Ōnojō in the Fukuoka Prefecture. In middle school, she played basketball. Upon transferring to high school in Kurume, she joined the school's cycling club. In 2022, she won the Japanese school championships in the individual pursuit. At the Asian Championships in June 2022, she won a silver medal in the junior scratch race, and at the Junior World Championships two months later, she and Maho Kakita became vice world champions in the Madison event.

From 2023, she rode for the elite national team and formed a team with Yumi Kajihara, Tsuyaka Uchino, and Maho Kakita that won the team pursuit competitions at the 2023 and 2024 Asian Championships as well as the Asian Games. She also won individual medals at the Asian Championships, including in the points race (2023), the scratch race (2024), and the omnium (2025). She participated in the team pursuit at the 2024 Olympics with the Japanese track cycling team.

In road cycling, Ikeda rode as a member of the national team in the 2023 Tour de l'Avenir Femmes, where she finished 66th. In 2025, she won the silver medal with the team in the mixed relay at the Asian Championships. In February 2025, she joined the newly founded Swiss UCI Women's Continental Team Nexetis, which also has a Japanese sponsor, the construction company NIPPO, in order to participate more in road cycling races.
