= Harshita Jakhar =

Indian cyclist (born 2007)

Harshita Jakhar (born 24 July 2007) is an Indian cyclist from Rajasthan. She is selected to represent India in the cycling events at the 2026 Asian Games at Nagoya, Aichi Prefecture, Japan from 19 September to 4 October 2026.

== Early life ==
Jakhar was born on 24 July 2007 in Siganganagar, Rajasthan, India. She is part of the Ministry of Youth Affairs and Sports’ Target Asian Games Group programme.. She trains at the Sports Authority of India National Centre of Excellence in Patiala. Her father, Rakesh Jakhar, a former cyclist, and a SAI coach at Patiala, is also her coach.

== Career ==
Jakhar started cycling in August 2020, along with her cousin Aditya Jakhar, on the roads of Patiala as a morning activity. Noticing her endurance to do 30km of cycling, he encouraged her to take up the sport. In In 2021, she took part in the U-14 trials at Bikaner and topped them. Later, she won gold medals at successive National Championships in Mumbai and Hyderabad.

In 2024, she won a silver and two bronze at the U-18 Asian Championships in Delhi.

In 2025, she claimed five medal in track and road events at the 2025 Asian Junior Cycling Championships. She won two silver medals, one in Individual Pursuit clocking 3:48:478 and another in Individual Point Race with 405 points. She also bagged three bronze medals in Individual Time Trial, road cycling Time Trial and Team Pursuit along with Bhumika, Amrita Kumari, and Basanti Kumawat, where India defeated Uzbekistan. In Individual Time Trial, she clocked 1:12.848 while in road Time Trial, she timed 15:23.777.

In May 2025, she won three gold medals in the 2025 Khelo India Youth Games. Her gold in the 2km Individual Pursuit event came in a time of 02:35.178.

=== Tour de France Femmes ===
In July 2026, was part of World Cycling Talent Programme group of eight cyclists selected by Union Cycliste Internationale (UCI) from Afghanistan, Algeria, Chile, Ethiopia (two riders), Namibia and Uganda too do the ceremonial start ahead of the 2026 Tour de France Femmes Stage 2. She cycled 4.5 kilometres on a neutralised section of the course.
