= Maho Kakita =

Japanese cyclist (born 2004)

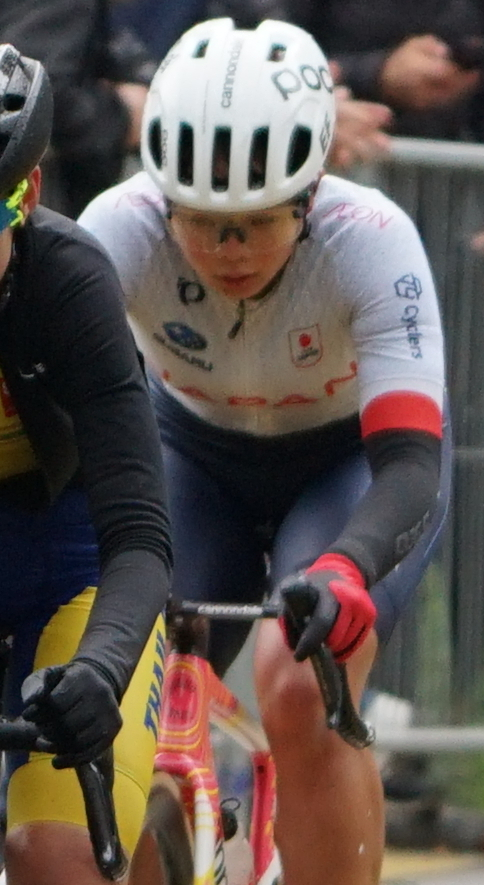
- Kakita during the 2024 Road World Championships

Personal information
- Born: 14 December 2004 (age 21) Kitakyushu, Japan

Cycling career
- Sport: Cycling
- Current team: Vini Fantini–BePink
- Disciplines: Track; Road
- Role: Rider

Professional teams
- 2023–2025: Team Rakuten K Dreams
- 2024: EF Education–Cannondale
- 2025-: BePink–Imatra–Bongioanni
Medal record
Representing Japan
Event	1st	2nd	3rd
World Championships	0	0	1
Asian Games	3	1	0
Asian Championships	8	1	1
World Junior Championships	0	1	0
Total	11	3	2
Women's track cycling
World Championships
Bronze medal – third place	2026 Shanghai	Madison
Asian Games
Gold medal – first place	2022 Hangzhou	Madison
Gold medal – first place	2022 Hangzhou	Team pursuit
Gold medal – first place	2026 Aichi–Nagoya	Madison
Silver medal – second place	2026 Aichi–Nagoya	Team pursuit
Asian Championships
Gold medal – first place	2023 Nilai	Team pursuit
Gold medal – first place	2024 New Delhi	Individual pursuit
Gold medal – first place	2024 New Delhi	Madison
Gold medal – first place	2024 New Delhi	Team pursuit
Gold medal – first place	2025 Nilai	Individual pursuit
Gold medal – first place	2025 Nilai	Team pursuit
Gold medal – first place	2025 Nilai	Points race
Gold medal – first place	2026 Tagaytay	Madison
Silver medal – second place	2026 Tagaytay	Team pursuit
Bronze medal – third place	2023 Nilai	Individual pursuit
World Junior Championships
Silver medal – second place	2022 Tel Aviv	Madison
Women's road bicycle racing
Asian Championships
Silver medal – second place	2025 Phitsanulok	Mixed team relay

Maho Kakita (垣田真穂, Kakita Maho; born 14 December 2004) is a Japanese racing cyclist, who currently rides for UCI Women's Continental Team Vini Fantini–BePink.

== Career ==
=== Track cycling ===
Kakita is a native of Kitakyushu, a township from the Ehime Prefecture, where she took up cycling in her third year of middle school, initially combining it with soccer. In high school, she won competitions at the national school championships. She was unable to participate in the 2021 Junior World Championships due to the impact of the COVID-19 pandemic. At the 2022 Asian Championships, she won two titles in the junior omnium and points race. At the 2022 Junior World Championships, she finished as runner-up in the Madison event alonsgide Mizuki Ikeda. Two months later, she competed in the 2022 UCI Road World Championships in Wollongong, finishing fifth in the junior women's road race event.

Since 2023, Kakita rode for the elite national team, mainly together with Yumi Kajihara, Tsuyaka Uchino. She achieved several successes in the team pursuit, notably winning the 2023 and 2024 Asian Championships and the Asian Games. In the Madison event, she won three more titles with Uchino, including the 2024 Nations Cup in Hong Kong. Her most significant individual achievements were as Asian Champion in the individual pursuit (2024, 2025) and the points race (2025). At the 2023 and 2025 Asian Championships, she set new Asian records in the individual pursuit. At the 2024 Olympic Games, she competed in the team pursuit and the Madison.

Kakita also continued to compete in road cycling as part of the national team, finishing sixth in the road race at the 2022 Asian Games and participating in the inaugural Tour de l'Avenir Femmes. She won three medals at the 2025 Asian Championships.
