= 2022 UEC European Track Championships (under-23 & junior) =

Track cycling championship

- Venue: Anadia
- Date(s): 14–19 July
- Velodrome: Velódromo Nacional Sangalhos

The 2022 UEC European Track Championships (under-23 & junior) were the 22nd continental championships for European under-23 and junior track cyclists, and the 13th since the event was renamed following the reorganisation of European track cycling in 2010. The event took place at the Velódromo Nacional Sangalhos in Anadia, Portugal from 14 to 19 July 2022.

== Medal summary ==
=== Under-23 ===
Event	Gold		Silver		Bronze	
Men's events
Sprint	Tijmen van Loon; Netherlands		Anton Höhne; Germany		Willy Weinrich; Germany	
Team sprint	Great Britain; James Bunting; Marcus Hiley; Hayden Norris	44.168	Germany; Anton Höhne; Julien Jäger; Willy Weinrich	44.174	Italy; Matteo Bianchi; Daniele Napolitano; Matteo Tugnolo	44.951
1 km time trial	Matteo Bianchi; Italy	1:00.911	Anton Höhne; Germany	1:01.316	Hayden Norris; Great Britain	1:01.541
Keirin	Matteo Bianchi; Italy		Daniele Napolitano; Italy		Anton Höhne; Germany	
Individual pursuit	Nicolas Heinrich; Germany	4:13.524	Tobias Buck-Gramcko; Germany	4:14.784	Manlio Moro; Italy	4:13.239
Team pursuit	Italy; Davide Boscaro; Mattia Pinazzi; Manlio Moro; Niccolò Galli	3:55.294	Belgium; Gianluca Pollefliet; Noah Vandenbranden; Thibaut Bernard; Tuur Dens		France; Clément Petit; Nicolas Hamon; Eddy Le Huitouze; Clément Cordenos	3:55.647
Points race	Maximilian Schmidbauer; Austria	64 pts	Diogo Narciso; Portugal	63 pts	Gregory Pouvreault; France	53 pts
Scratch	William Tidball; Great Britain		Tim Wafler; Austria		Kyrylo Tsarenko; Ukraine	
Madison	Netherlands; Yanne Dorenbos; Philip Heijnen	54 pts	Great Britain; William Tidball; Samuel Watson	37 pts	Germany; Malte Maschke; Tim Torn Teutenberg	26 pts (Doping)
Omnium	Oscar Nilsson-Julien; Great Britain	165 pts	Tim Torn Teutenberg; Germany	163 pts	Philip Heijnen; Netherlands	156 pts
Elimination race	Davide Boscaro; Italy		Tim Torn Teutenberg; Germany		Filip Prokopyszyn; Poland	
Women's events
Sprint	Alessa-Catriona Pröpster; Germany		Julie Michaux; France		Taky Kouame; France	
Team sprint	Germany; Katharina Albers; Alessa-Catriona Pröpster; Christina Sperlich	49.293	Poland; Joanna Blaszczak; Paulina Petri; Nikola Sibiak	49.610	Only 2 teams	-
500 m time trial	Taky Kouame; France	33.860	Veronika Jaborníková; Czech Republic	34.690	Alessa-Catriona Pröpster; Germany	34.750
Keirin	Alessa-Catriona Pröpster; Germany		Taky Kouame; France		Paulina Petri; Poland	
Individual pursuit	Vittoria Guazzini; Italy	3:27.222	Ella Barnwell; Great Britain	OVL	Silvia Zanardi; Italy	3:29.598
Team pursuit	Italy; Silvia Zanardi; Vittoria Guazzini; Eleonora Camilla Gasparrini; Matilde Vitillo	4:18.521	Great Britain; Eluned King; Ella Barnwell; Kate Richardson; Sophie Lewis	4:25.943	Germany; Fabienne Jährig; Lana Eberle; Lena Charlotte Reißner; Hanna Dopjans	4:27.731
Points race	Silvia Zanardi; Italy	63 pts	Daniek Hengeveld; Netherlands	57 pts	Kristina Nenadovic; France	38 pts
Scratch	Petra Ševčíková; Czech Republic		Ella Barnwell; Great Britain		Daniela Campos; Portugal	
Madison	Italy; Matilde Vitillo; Silvia Zanardi	36 pts	Great Britain; Eluned King; Sophie Lewis	31 pts	Belgium; Shari Bossuyt; Katrijn De Clercq	28 pts
Omnium	Shari Bossuyt; Belgium	129 pts	Daniek Hengeveld; Netherlands	121 pts	Jade Labastugue; France	115 pts
Elimination race	Shari Bossuyt; Belgium		Sophie Lewis; Great Britain		Kristina Nenadovic; France	

- Madison: Initialement troisièmes, les allemands Malte Maschke et Tim Torn Teutenberg ont été déclassés en décembre 2023, car Maschke a manqué à trois reprises des contrôles antidopage en douze mois. Belgium in 4th place. BEL Belgium (Noah Vandenbranden, Gianluca Pollefliet)

=== Junior ===
Event	Gold		Silver		Bronze	
Men's events
Sprint	Mattia Predomo; Italy		Marcin Marciniak; Poland		Danny-Luca Werner; Germany	
Team sprint	Germany; Torben Osterheld; Luca Spiegel; Danny-Luca Werner	45.069	Poland; Gracjan Dąbrowski; Mateusz Przymusiński; Marcin Marciniak	45.677	Italy; Milo Marcolli; Stefano Minuta; Mattia Predomo	45.880
1 km time trial	Matěj Hytych; Czech Republic	1:03.076	Kenneth Meng; Germany	1:03.302	Beñat Garaiar; Spain	1:03.364
Keirin	Mattia Predomo; Italy		Marcin Marciniak; Poland		Stefano Minuta; Italy	
Individual pursuit	Luca Giami; Italy	3:10.784	Ben Felix Jochum; Germany	3:10.861	Josh Tarling; Great Britain	3:13.478
Team pursuit	Italy; Alessio Delle Vedove; Renato Favero; Luca Giami; Andrea Raccagni Noviero	3:59.703	Germany; Ben Felix Jochum; Bruno Kessler; Tobias Müller; Jasper Schröder	4:03.641	Great Britain; Ben Wiggins; Dylan Hicks; Noah Hobbs; Josh Tarling	4:03.669
Points race	Ben Wiggins; Great Britain	56 pts	Justus Willemsen; Netherlands	50 pts	Titouan Fontaine; France	47 pts
Scratch	Rafael Delhomme; France		Lorenzo Anniballi; Italy		Jed Smithson; Great Britain	
Madison	Czech Republic; Milan Kadlec; Matyáš Koblížek	34 pts	Netherlands; Elmar Abma; Justus Willemsen	26 pts	Great Britain; Dylan Hicks; Josh Tarling	23 pts
Omnium	Elmar Abma; Netherlands	116 pts	Noah Hobbs; Great Britain	107 pts	Daniil Yakovlev; Ukraine	102 pts
Elimination race	Matteo Fiorin; Italy		Jed Smithson; Great Britain		Žak Eržen; Slovenia	
Women's events
Sprint	Clara Schneider; Germany		Stella Müller; Germany		Julie Nicolaes; Belgium	
Team sprint	Germany; Lara-Sophie Jäger; Stella Müller; Clara Schneider	49.981	Czech Republic; Anna Jaborníková; Sára Kateřina Peterková; Michaela Poulová	51.636	Poland; Natalia Kaczmarczyk; Eliza Rabażyńska; Natalia Głowacka	52.500
500 m time trial	Clara Schneider; Germany	34.918	Julie Nicolaes; Belgium	35.177	Lara-Sophie Jäger; Germany	36.127
Keirin	Anna Jaborníková; Czech Republic		Clara Schneider; Germany		Lara-Sophie Jäger; Germany	
Individual pursuit	Federica Venturelli; Italy	2:20.808	Isabel Sharp; Great Britain	2:23.571	Lara Lallemant; France	2:24.778
Team pursuit	Italy; Francesca Pellegrini; Martina Sanfilippo; Federica Venturelli; Valentina Zanzi	4:28.759	Germany; Hannah Kunz; Justyna Czapla; Seana Littbarski-Gray; Magdalena Fuchs	4:33.250	Poland; Zuzanna Chylińska; Anna Długas; Maja Tracka; Martyna Szczęsna	4:39.601
Points race	Isabel Sharp; Great Britain	58 pts	Aurore Pernollet; France	35 pts	Hélène Hesters; Belgium	25 pts
Scratch	Lani Wittevrongel; Belgium		Maja Tracka; Poland		Ori Bash; Israel	
Madison	Netherlands; Babette van der Wolf; Nienke Veenhoven	24 pts	Germany; Justyna Czapla; Jette Simon	23 pts	Belgium; Hélène Hesters; Febe Jooris	13 pts
Omnium	Federica Venturelli; Italy	147 pts	Doriane Kaufman; France	113 pts	Grace Lister; Great Britain	107 pts
Elimination race	Barbora Nĕmcová; Czech Republic		Anna Kolyzhuk; Ukraine		Awen Roberts; Great Britain	

== Medal table ==
* Host nation (Portugal)

Rank	Nation	Gold	Silver	Bronze	Total
1	Italy	16	2	5	23
2	Germany	8	13	7	28
3	Great Britain	5	9	7	21
4	Czech Republic	5	2	0	7
5	Netherlands	4	4	1	9
6	Belgium	3	2	5	10
7	France	2	4	8	14
8	Austria	1	1	0	2
9	Poland	0	5	4	9
10	Ukraine	0	1	2	3
11	Portugal*	0	1	1	2
12	Israel	0	0	1	1
12	Slovenia	0	0	1	1
12	Spain	0	0	1	1
Totals (14 entries)		44	44	43	131
