= 2022 UCI Junior Track Cycling World Championships =

- Venue: Tel Aviv, Israel
- Date: 23–27 August 2022
- Velodrome: Sylvan Adams National Velodrome

The 2022 UCI Junior Track Cycling World Championships were the 47th annual Junior World Championships for track cycling, held in Tel Aviv, Israel from 23 to 27 August.

The Championships had eleven events each for men and women (sprint, points race, individual pursuit, team pursuit, time trial, team sprint, keirin, madison, scratch race, omnium, elimination race).

== Medal summary ==
Event	Gold	Silver	Bronze
Men's events
Sprint	Mattia Predomo; Italy	Ryan Elliott; Australia	Luca Spiegel; Germany
Points race	Bruno Keßler; Germany	Dario Belletta; Italy	Valentyn Kabashnyi; Ukraine
Individual pursuit	Carson Mattern; Canada	Theodor Storm; Denmark	Ben Jochum; Germany
Team pursuit	Renato Favero; Alessio Delle Vedove; Luca Giaimi; Matteo Fiorin; Andrea Raccagni Noviero; Italy	Tobias Müller; Ben Jochum; Bruno Keßler; Jasper Schröder; Leon Arenz; Germany	Kyle Aitken; Lewis Johnston; Joel Douglas; Oliver Watson Palmer; Edward Pawson; New Zealand
Time trial	Matěj Hytych; Czech Republic	Mattia Predomo; Italy	Minato Nakaishi; Japan
Team sprint	Ryan Elliott; Maxwell Liebeknecht; Dylan Stanton; Australia	Pete Flemming; Luca Spiegel; Danny Werner; Torben Osterheld; Germany	Luke Blackwood; Liam Cavanagh; Jaxson Russell; New Zealand
Keirin	Mattia Predomo; Italy	Francisco Jaramillo; Colombia	Ayato Abe; Japan
Madison	Milan Kadlec; Radovan Štec; Czech Republic	Valentyn Kabashnyi; Daniil Yakovlev; Ukraine	Bruno Keßler; Jasper Schröder; Germany
Scratch race	Dominik Ratajczak; Poland	Daniil Yakovlev; Ukraine	Žak Eržen; Slovenia
Omnium	Carson Mattern; Canada	Dominik Ratajczak; Poland	Tobias Müller; Germany
Elimination race	Žak Eržen; Slovenia	Jhohan Marín; Colombia	Matyáš Koblížek; Czech Republic

Event	Gold	Silver	Bronze
Women's events
Sprint	Clara Schneider; Germany	Chaeyeon Kim; South Korea	Julie Nicolaes; Belgium
Individual pursuit	Federica Venturelli; Italy	Isabel Sharp; United Kingdom	Lara Lallemant; France
Time trial	Chaeyeon Kim; South Korea	Clara Schneider; Germany	Julie Nicolaes; Belgium
Points race	Heïdi Gaugain; France	Chloe Patrick; United States	Anna Kolyzhuk; Ukraine
Keirin	Clara Schneider; Germany	Kim Do-ye; South Korea	Anna Jaborníková; Czech Republic
Scratch race	Maja Tracka; Poland	Chloe Patrick; United States	Anna Kolyzhuk; Ukraine
Team sprint	Lara Jäger; Stella Müller; Clara Schneider; Bente Lürmann; Germany	Sophie Marr; Tyler Puzicha; Emma Stevens; Australia	Anna Jaborníková; Natálie Mikšaníková; Sára Peterková; Czech Republic
Team pursuit	Clémence Chéreau; Aurore Pernollet; Heïdi Gaugain; Lara Lallemant; France	Martina Sanfilippo; Federica Venturelli; Francesca Pellegrini; Valentina Zanzi; Vittoria Grassi; Italy	Justyna Czapla; Magdalena Fuchs; Seana Littbarski-Gray; Hannah Kunz; Jette Simon; Germany
Omnium	Aurore Pernollet; France	Maja Tracka; Poland	Grace Lister; United Kingdom
Madison	Grace Lister; Zoe Bäckstedt; Great Britain	Maho Kakita; Mizuki Ikeda; Japan	Babette van der Wolf; Nienke Veenhoven; Netherlands
Elimination race	Barbora Němcová; Czech Republic	Anna Kolyzhuk; Ukraine	Isabel Sharp; United Kingdom

== Medal table ==
* Host nation (Israel)

Rank	Nation	Gold	Silver	Bronze	Total
1	Germany	4	3	5	12
2	Italy	4	3	0	7
3	Czech Republic	3	0	3	6
4	France	3	0	1	4
5	Poland	2	2	0	4
6	Canada	2	0	0	2
7	Australia	1	2	0	3
7	South Korea	1	2	0	3
9	Great Britain	1	1	2	4
10	Slovenia	1	0	1	2
11	Ukraine	0	3	3	6
12	Colombia	0	2	0	2
12	United States	0	2	0	2
14	Japan	0	1	2	3
15	Denmark	0	1	0	1
16	Belgium	0	0	2	2
16	New Zealand	0	0	2	2
18	Netherlands	0	0	1	1
Totals (18 entries)		22	22	22	66
