= Tobias Müller (cyclist) =

German cyclist

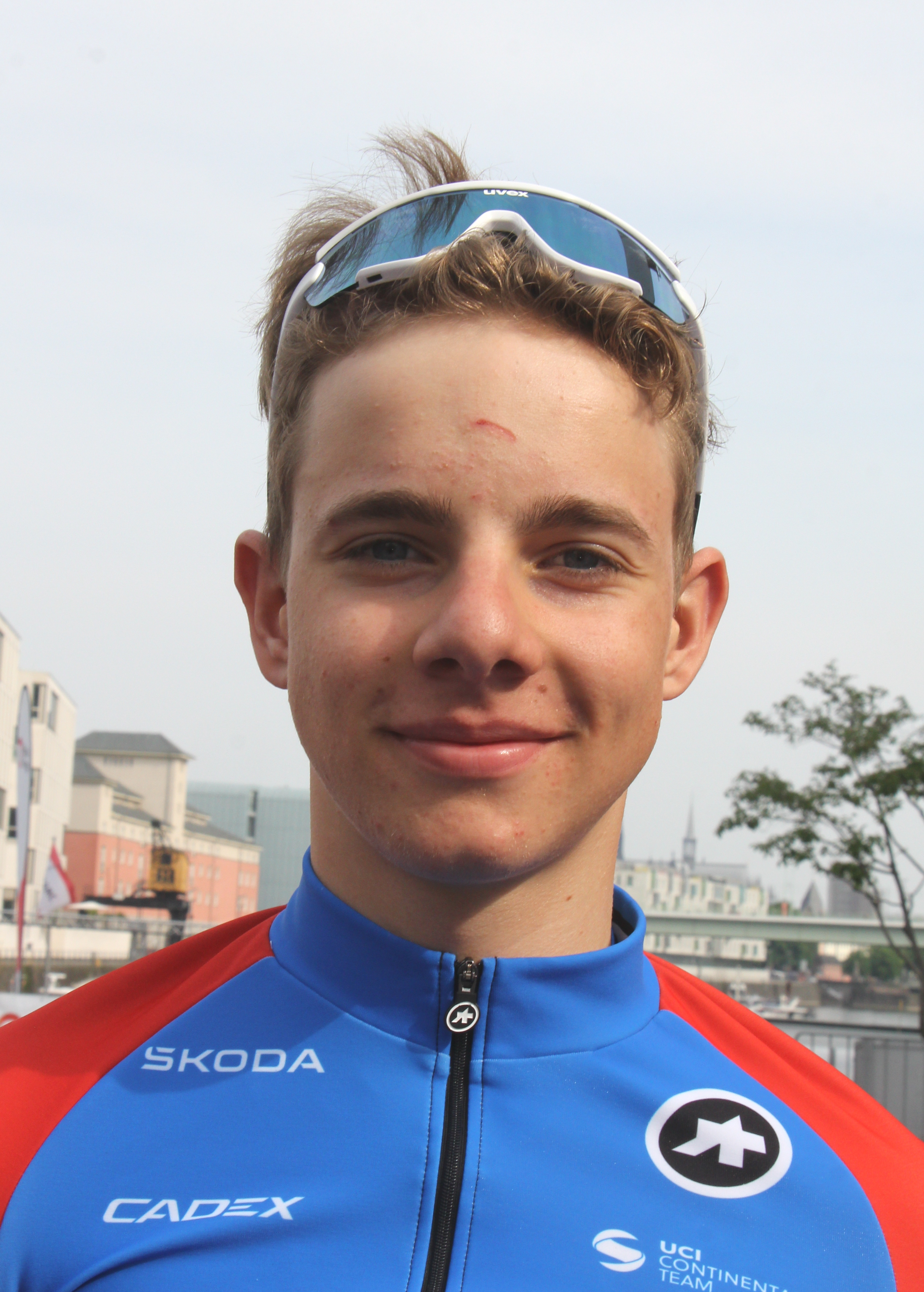
- Müller in 2023

Personal information
- Born: 31 March 2004 (age 22) Gera, Germany
- Height: 1.74 m (5 ft 9 in)
- Weight: 66 kg (146 lb)

Cycling career
- Sport: Cycling
- Current team: Unibet Rose Rockets
- Disciplines: Road; Track
- Role: Rider

Amateur team
- 2021–2022: Rose Team NRW

Professional teams
- 2023–2024: Heizomat–rad-net.de
- 2025: Wanty–Nippo–ReUz
- 2026–: Unibet Rose Rockets

Tobias Müller (born 31 March 2004) is a German road and track cyclist, who rides for UCI ProTeam Unibet Rose Rockets.

== Major results ==
=== Road ===
2023
6th Eschborn–Frankfurt Under-23
10th Paris–Troyes
2024
3rd Paris–Troyes
8th Gent–Wevelgem U23
2025
1st Grand Prix Cerami
2nd Grote Prijs Rik Van Looy
2nd Omloop Het Nieuwsblad U23
7th Grand Prix de la Ville de Lillers
8th Youngster Coast Challenge
2026
2nd Grand Prix de Fourmies
4th Rund um Köln
5th Classique Dunkerque
5th Time trial, National Under-23 Championships
6th Brussels Cycling Classic
9th Circuit de Wallonie

=== Track ===
2022
UCI World Junior Championships

2nd Team pursuit
3rd Omnium

2nd Team pursuit, UEC European Junior Championships
2024
1st Team pursuit, National Championships
2025
1st Team pursuit, National Championships
2026
UEC European Under-23 Championships

3rd Madison (with Bruno Keßler)
3rd Points race
