= Kaia Schmid =

American cyclist (born 2003)

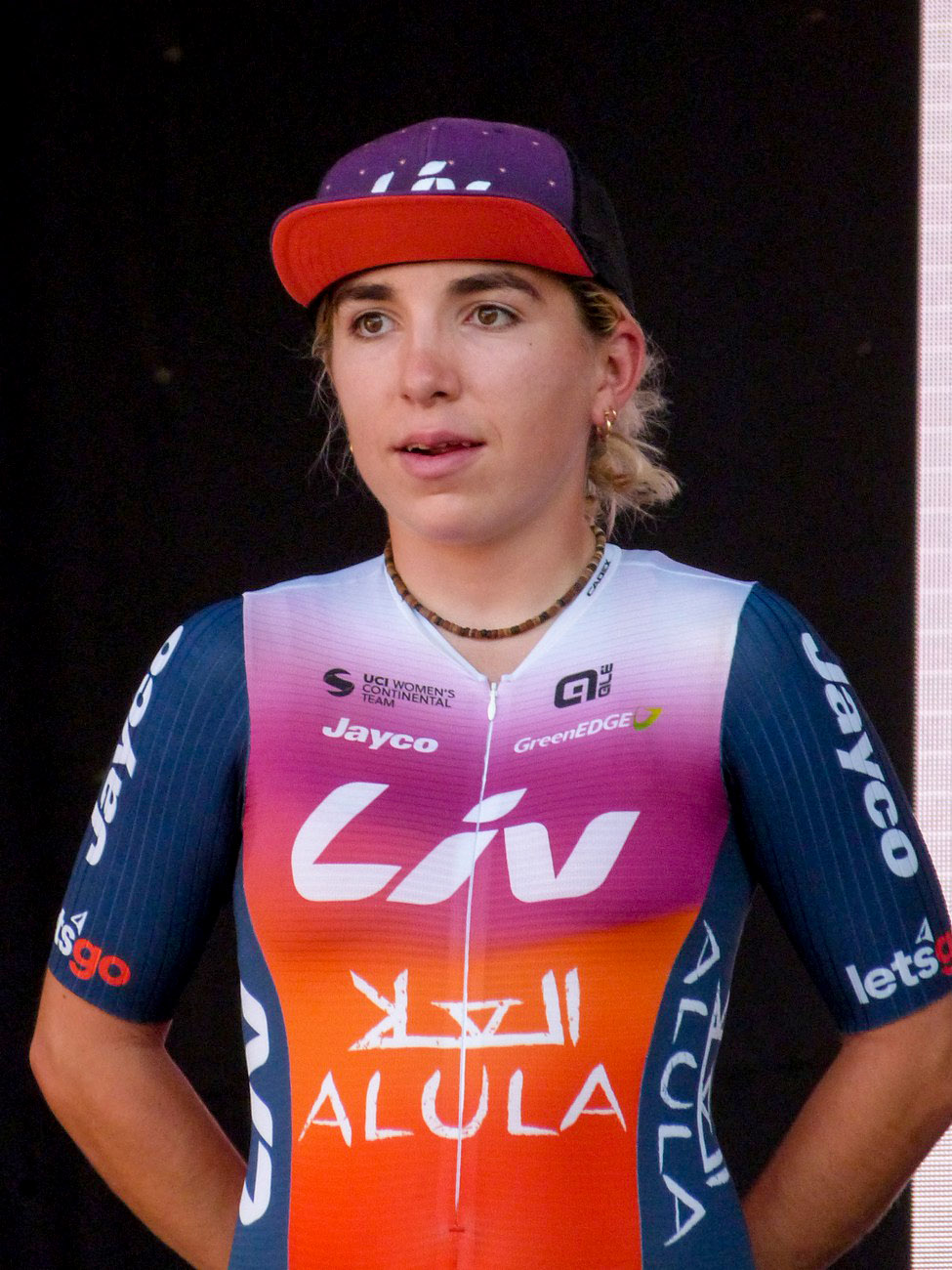
- Schmid in 2024

Personal information
- Full name: Kaia Schmid
- Born: January 7, 2003 (age 23) Marblehead, Massachusetts, U.S.

Cycling career
- Sport: Cycling
- Current team: Liv-AlUla-Jayco Women's Continental Team
- Discipline: Road
- Role: Rider

Amateur team
- 2020-2021: LUX Junior Cycling

Professional teams
- 2022–2023: Human Powered Health
- 2024–: Liv-AlUla-Jayco Women's Continental Team
Medal record
Representing United States
Women's road cycling
World Championships
Silver medal – second place	2021 Flanders	Junior road race
Women's track cycling
World Junior Championships
Gold medal – first place	2021 Cairo	Elimination Race
Silver medal – second place	2021 Cairo	Omnium
Bronze medal – third place	2021 Cairo	Points Race

Kaia Schmid (born January 7, 2003) is an American professional cyclist, who currently rides for Liv AlUla Jayco's Continental team.

== Amateur career ==
Schmid was raised in Marblehead, Massachusetts, where she pursued track, cyclo-cross, and road cycling, as well as mogul skiing. By 2018, Schmid committed to cycling, and rode with the amateur New England Devo team before joining LUX Junior Cycling in 2020. She had a successful junior career, winning seven national titles on the road and track, a world track title in the elimination race, and a silver medal in the road race at 2021 UCI Road World Championships.

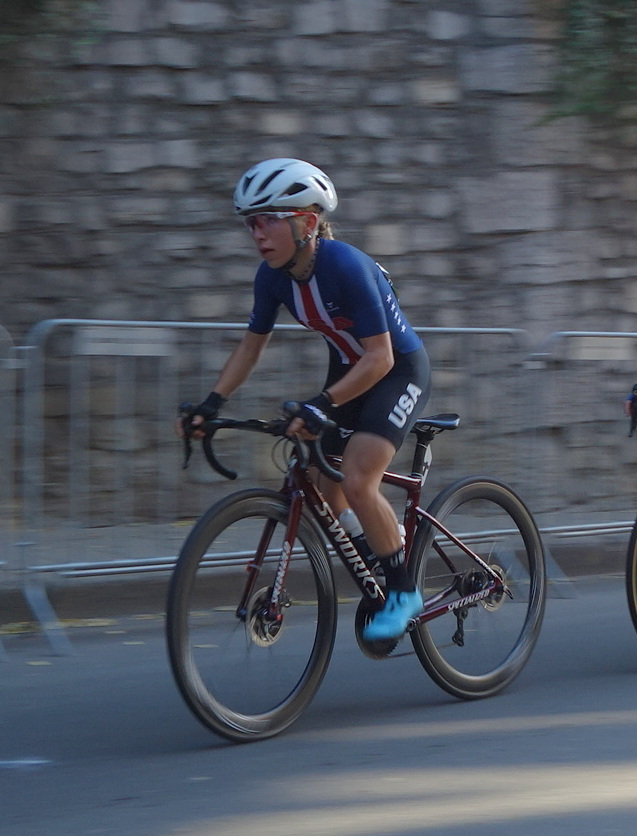
Schmid riding in 2021

Following her performance at the world championships, Schmid was called "next big star of American bike racing" in 2021 by Cyclingnews.com. She was also named to a list of "six young riders to watch" for 2022 by Velo magazine.

== Professional career ==
Schmid joined UCI WorldTeam Human Powered Health before the 2022 season. In interviews with both Cyclingnews.com and Velo, Schmid has stated she struggled physically and mentally with the transition from junior to professional racing. Schmid dealt with multiple illnesses during the 2022 season, including glandular fever, and crashed during a race, causing her to miss multiple months with injury. Schmid revealed in 2023 that she was also impacted by relative energy deficiency in sport during this time. Reflecting on the mental transition of winning at the junior level to "merely fighting for survival" in senior races, Schmid has advocated for more U23 women's races to help young riders develop, similar to what exists in men's cycling.

== Major results ==
=== Road ===
2021
2nd Road race, UCI World Junior Road Championships
2022
5th MerXem Classic
