= 2026 Grand Prix de Fourmies =

- 2026 UCI ProSeries

Race details
- Dates: 13 September 2026
- Stages: 1
- Distance: 200.1 km (124.3 mi)
- Winning time: 4h 29' 05"

Results
	Winner	Arvid de Kleijn (NED)	(Tudor Pro Cycling Team)
	Second	Tobias Müller (GER)	(Unibet Rose Rockets)
	Third	Ethan Vernon (GBR)	(NSN Cycling Team)

The 2026 Grand Prix de Fourmies was the 93rd edition of the Grand Prix de Fourmies road cycling, a one-day road cycling race in and around Fourmies in northern France.

== Teams ==
Eight UCI WorldTeams, six UCI ProTeams, and five UCI Continental teams made up the nineteen teams that participated in the race.

UCI WorldTeams

- Alpecin–Premier Tech
- Decathlon CMA CGM
- Groupama–FDJ United
- Lotto–Intermarché
- NSN Cycling Team
- Soudal–Quick-Step
- Team Picnic–PostNL
- Uno-X Mobility

UCI ProTeams

- Cofidis
- Pinarello–Q36.5 Pro Cycling Team
- Team Polti VisitMalta
- Team Flanders–Baloise
- Team TotalEnergies
- Tudor Pro Cycling Team
- Unibet Rose Rockets

UCI Continental Teams

- CIC Pro Cycling Academy
- Nice Métropole Côte d'Azur
- St. Michel–Preference Home–Auber93
- Van Rysel–Roubaix

== Result ==
Result
Rank	Rider	Team	Time
1	Arvid de Kleijn (NED)	Tudor Pro Cycling Team	4h 29' 05"
2	Tobias Müller (GER)	Unibet Rose Rockets	+ 0"
3	Ethan Vernon (GBR)	NSN Cycling Team	+ 0"
4	Pavel Bittner (CZE)	Team Picnic–PostNL	+ 0"
5	Matteo Moschetti (ITA)	Pinarello–Q36.5 Pro Cycling Team	+ 0"
6	Giovanni Lonardi (ITA)	Team Polti VisitMalta	+ 0"
7	Alexander Konijn (NED)	Nice Métropole Côte d'Azur	+ 0"
8	Gerben Thijssen (BEL)	Alpecin–Premier Tech	+ 0"
9	Robbe Ghys (BEL)	Decathlon CMA CGM	+ 0"
10	Tim Marsman (NED)	Alpecin–Premier Tech	+ 0"
