= 2021 UCI Junior Track Cycling World Championships =

- Venue: Cairo, Egypt
- Date: 1–5 September 2021
- Velodrome: Cairo International Velodrome

The 2021 UCI Junior Track Cycling World Championships were the 46th annual Junior World Championships for track cycling, held in Cairo, Egypt from 1 to 5 September.

The Championships had eleven events each for men and women (sprint, points race, individual pursuit, team pursuit, time trial, team sprint, keirin, madison, scratch race, omnium, elimination race).

== Medal summary ==
Event	Gold	Silver	Bronze
Men's events
Sprint	Nikita Kalachnik; Russia	Willy Weinrich; Germany	Mattia Predomo; Italy
Points race	Dylan Bibic; Canada	Radovan Štec; Czech Republic	Mikhail Postarnak; Russia
Individual pursuit	Samuele Bonetto; Italy	Jasper Schröder; Germany	Andrea Violato; Italy
Team pursuit	Benjamin Boos; Luis-Joe Lührs; Ben Jochum; Jasper Schröder; Nicolas Zippan; Germany	Bryan Olivo; Andrea Violato; Lino Colosio; Alessio Delle Vedove; Samuele Mion; Italy	Daniil Zarakovskiy; Grigorii Skorniakov; Mikhail Postarnak; Mark Kryuchkov; Dmitrii Dolzhikov; Russia
Time trial	Grigorii Skorniakov; Russia	Willy Weinrich; Germany	Kirill Kurdidi; Kazakhstan
Team sprint	Bogdan Medenets; David Shekelashvili; Nikita Kalachnik; Alexander Popov; Russia	Luca Spiegel; Paul Groß; Willy Weinrich; Max Briese; Germany	Tomasz Grzesiak; Marcin Marciniak; Mateusz Przymusiński; Radosław Laskowski; Poland
Keirin	Nikita Kalachnik; Russia	Jakub Malášek; Czech Republic	David Shekelashvili; Russia
Madison	Daniil Valgonen; Grigorii Skorniakov; Russia	Radovan Štec; Matyáš Koblížek; Czech Republic	Dylan Bibic; Carson Mattern; Canada
Scratch race	Carson Mattern; Canada	Pascal Tappeiner; Switzerland	Lorenzo Ursella; Italy
Omnium	Radovan Štec; Czech Republic	Dylan Bibic; Canada	Daniil Valgonen; Russia
Elimination race	Joshua Dike; South Africa	Dario Igor Belletta; Italy	Guillermo Esquivel Ortiz; Mexico

Event	Gold	Silver	Bronze
Women's events
Sprint	Alina Lysenko; Russia	Alla Biletska; Ukraine	Yuliya Golubkova; Kazakhstan
Individual pursuit	Alina Moiseeva; Russia	Bénédicte Ollier; France	Franzi Arendt; Germany
Time trial	Alina Lysenko; Russia	Clara Schneider; Germany	Elizaveta Bogomolova; Russia
Points race	Alena Ivanchenko; Russia	Valentina Basilico; Italy	Kaia Schmid; United States
Keirin	Alina Lysenko; Russia	Clara Schneider; Germany	Alla Biletska; Ukraine
Scratch race	Jette Simon; Germany	Marith Vanhove; Belgium	Valentina Basilico; Italy
Team sprint	Elizaveta Bogomolova; Alina Lysenko; Elizaveta Krechkina; Varvara Blagodarova; Russia	Lara-Sophie Jäger; Clara Schneider; Stella Müller; Germany	Alessia Paccalini; Sara Fiorin; Valentina Basilico; Rebecca Bacchettini; Italy
Team pursuit	Alena Ivanchenko; Alina Moiseeva; Valeria Valgonen; Inna Abaidullina; Russia	Bénédicte Ollier; Flavie Boulais; Jade Labastugue; Lara Lallemant; Doriane Kaufmann; France	Olga Wankiewicz; Maja Tracka; Wiktoria Milda; Tamara Szalińska; Anna Długaś; Poland
Omnium	Inna Abaidullina; Russia	Kaia Schmid; United States	Valentina Basilico; Italy
Madison	Inna Abaidullina; Alena Ivanchenko; Russia	Jade Labastugue; Bénédicte Ollier; France	Yuli van der Molen; Nienke Veenhoven; Netherlands
Elimination race	Kaia Schmid; United States	Lana Eberle; Germany	Gabriela Bártová; Czech Republic

== Medal table ==
* Host nation (Egypt)

Rank	Nation	Gold	Silver	Bronze	Total
1	Russia	14	0	5	19
2	Germany	2	8	1	11
3	Canada	2	1	1	4
4	Italy	1	3	6	10
5	Czech Republic	1	3	1	5
6	United States	1	1	1	3
7	South Africa	1	0	0	1
8	France	0	3	0	3
9	Ukraine	0	1	1	2
10	Belgium	0	1	0	1
10	Switzerland	0	1	0	1
12	Kazakhstan	0	0	2	2
12	Poland	0	0	2	2
14	Mexico	0	0	1	1
14	Netherlands	0	0	1	1
Totals (15 entries)		22	22	22	66
