= Titouan Fontaine =

French cyclist

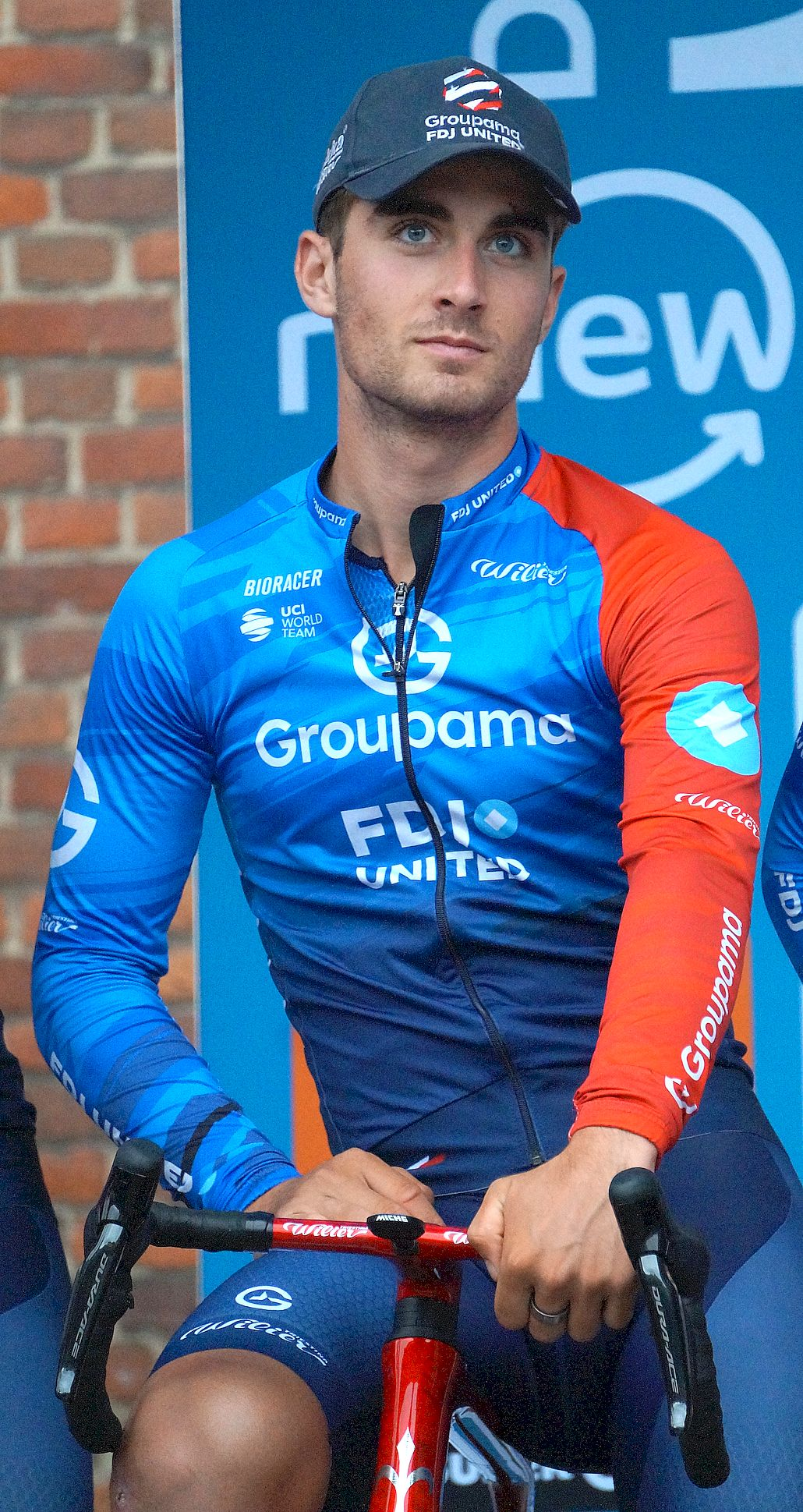
- Fontaine in 2026

Personal information
- Born: 20 May 2005 (age 21) Gleizé, France
- Height: 1.83 m (6 ft 0 in)
- Weight: 70 kg (154 lb)

Cycling career
- Sport: Cycling
- Current team: Groupama–FDJ United
- Discipline: Road
- Role: Rider

Amateur team
- 2022–2023: VC Villefranche Beaujolais

Professional teams
- 2024–2025: Équipe Continentale Groupama–FDJ
- 2026–: Groupama–FDJ United

Titouan Fontaine (born 20 May 2005) is a French cyclist, who currently rides for UCI WorldTeam Groupama–FDJ United.

== Major results ==
2022
2nd Chrono des Nations Juniors
2022
3rd Points race, European Junior Track Championships
3rd Time trial, National Junior Road Championships
4th Overall Tour de Gironde

1st Young rider classification

2023
1st La Bernaudeau Junior
2nd Overall Trophée Centre Morbihan

1st Stage 1

8th Chrono des Nations Juniors
