= Luis-Joe Lührs =

German cyclist (born 2003)

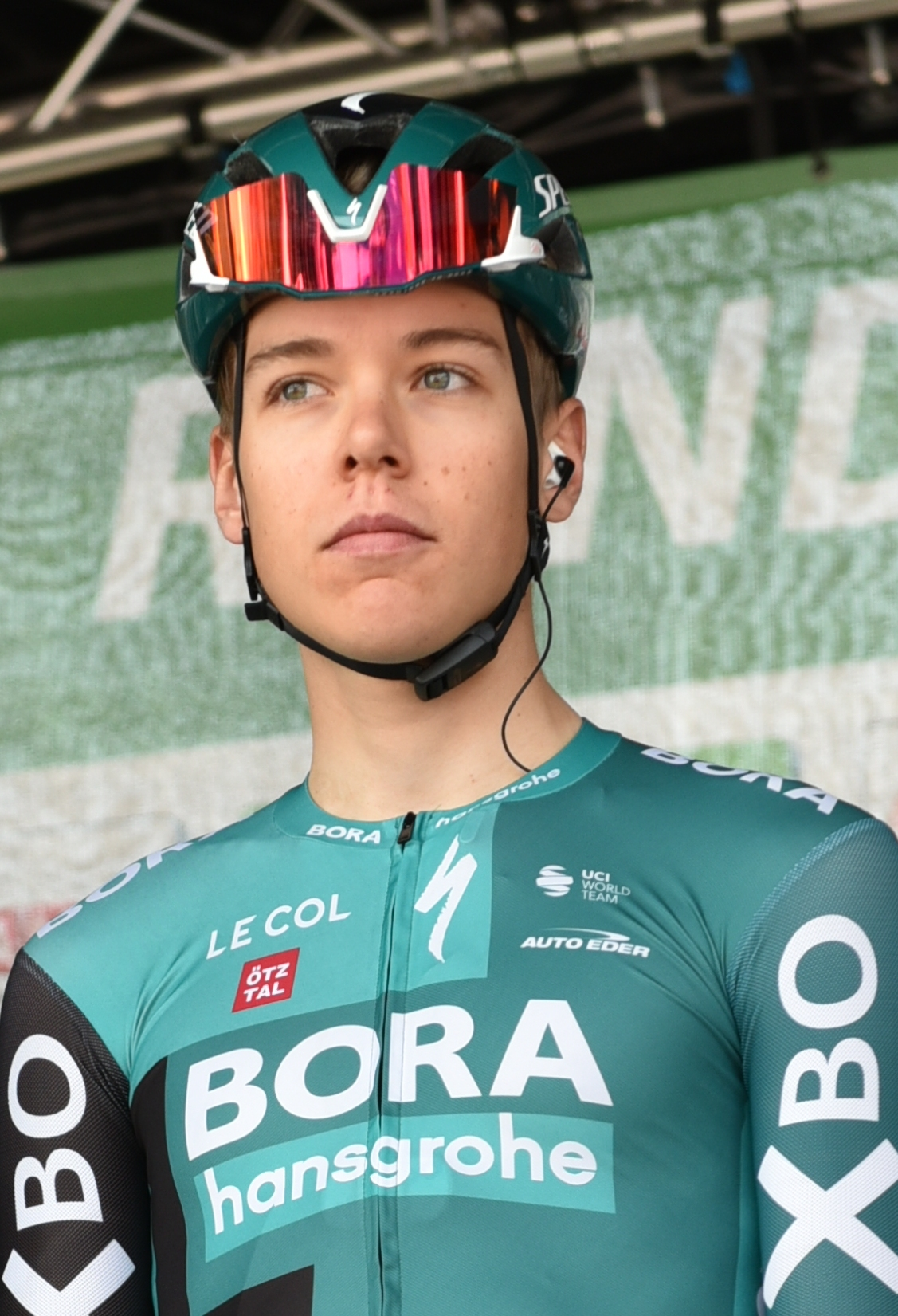
- Lührs at 2022 Rund um Köln

Personal information
- Born: 20 January 2003 (age 23) Munich, Germany
- Height: 1.78 m (5 ft 10 in)
- Weight: 67 kg (148 lb)

Cycling career
- Sport: Cycling
- Disciplines: Road; Track
- Role: Rider (retired)

Amateur team
- 2020–2021: Team Auto Eder Bayern

Professional teams
- 2022–2024: Bora–Hansgrohe
- 2025: Decathlon–AG2R La Mondiale Development Team
Medal record
Men's track cycling
Representing Germany
World Junior Championships
Gold medal – first place	2021 Cairo	Team pursuit
European Under-23 & Junior Championships
Silver medal – second place	2020 Fiorenzuola d'Arda	Junior team pursuit

Luis-Joe Lührs (born 20 January 2003) is a former road and track cyclist from Germany.

== Career ==
Lührs started competitive cycling when he was 11 years old, following his older brother Leslie Lührs. In 2020, Lührs joined Team Auto Eder, the feeder team of Red Bull–Bora–Hansgrohe. After being promoted to the UCI WorldTeam in 2022, he rode for Red Bull–Bora–Hansgrohe for three years. For the 2025 cycling season, Lührs signed a contract with Decathlon–AG2R La Mondiale Development Team and ended his professional career after that year.

== Major results ==
=== Road ===
2020
2nd Time trial, National Junior Road Championships
2021
1st Stage 4 Ain Bugey Valromey Tour
2nd La Classique des Alpes Juniors
2nd Grand Prix West Bohemia
10th Road race, UCI Junior Road World Championships
2022
1st Gippinger Radsporttage
1st Stage 5 (TTT) Tour de l'Avenir

=== Track ===
2020
2nd Team pursuit, UEC European Junior Championships
2021
1st Team pursuit, UCI Junior World Championships
