= 2024 UCI Track Cycling World Championships – Men's team pursuit =

Men's team pursuit at the 2024 UCI Track Cycling World Championships
- Venue: Ballerup Super Arena
- Location: Ballerup, Denmark
- Dates: 16–17 October
- Competitors: 44 from 11 nations
- Teams: 11
- Winning time: 3:45.642

Medalists
gold medal	Tobias Hansen; Carl-Frederik Bévort; Niklas Larsen; Frederik Madsen; Rasmus Pedersen	Denmark
silver medal	Ethan Hayter; Josh Charlton; Charlie Tanfield; Oliver Wood; Rhys Britton	Great Britain
bronze medal	Tim Torn Teutenberg; Benjamin Boos; Ben Jochum; Bruno Keßler; Felix Groß	Germany

The Men's team pursuit competition at the 2024 UCI Track Cycling World Championships was held on 16 and 17 October 2024.

== Results ==
=== Qualifying ===
The qualifying was started on 16 October at 12:40. The eight fastest teams advanced to the first round.

Rank	Nation	Time	Behind	Notes
1	Great Britain; Ethan Hayter; Josh Charlton; Charlie Tanfield; Oliver Wood	3:48.759		Q
2	Denmark; Carl-Frederik Bévort; Niklas Larsen; Frederik Madsen; Rasmus Pedersen	3:48.983	+0.224	Q
3	Switzerland; Noah Bogli; Mats Poot; Valère Thiébaud; Alex Vogel	3:55.084	+6.325	Q
4	United States; Grant Koontz; David Domonoske; Anders Johnson; Brendan Rhim	3:55.745	+6.986	Q
5	Germany; Benjamin Boos; Felix Groß; Ben Jochum; Bruno Keßler	3:56.948	+8.189	Q
6	Japan; Naoki Kojima; Shoki Kawano; Kazushige Kuboki; Shoi Matsuda	3:57.300	+8.541	Q
7	Canada; Chris Ernst; Mathias Guillemette; Campbell Parrish; Sean Richardson	3:58.379	+9.520	Q
8	China; Li Boan; Wang Mengjie; Yang Yang; Zhang Jinyan	4:00.589	+11.830	Q
9	Poland; Alan Banaszek; Konrad Waliniak; Filip Prokopyszyn; Adam Wożniak	4:01.006	+12.247	
10	Spain; Erik Martorell; Joan Martí Bennassar; Beñat Garaiar; Álvaro Navas	4:01.705	+12.946	
11	Italy; Davide Boscaro; Renato Favero; Francesco Lamon; Manlio Moro	4:02.072	+13.313	

=== First round ===
The first round was started on 16 October at 19:44.

First round heats were held as follows:
Heat 1: 6th v 7th fastest
Heat 2: 5th v 8th fastest
Heat 3: 2nd v 3rd fastest
Heat 4: 1st v 4th fastest

The winners of heats three and four advanced to the gold medal race. The remaining six teams were ranked on time, from which the top two proceeded to the bronze medal race.

Rank	Heat	Nation	Time	Notes
1	1	Japan; Shunsuke Imamura; Naoki Kojima; Shoki Kawano; Shoi Matsuda	3:54.826	QB
2	1	Canada; Chris Ernst; Mathias Guillemette; Campbell Parrish; Sean Richardson	3:55.638	
1	2	Germany; Benjamin Boos; Felix Groß; Ben Jochum; Bruno Keßler	3:54.252	QB
2	2	China; Li Boan; Wang Mengjie; Yang Yang; Zhang Jinyan	3:59.747	
1	3	Denmark; Carl-Frederik Bévort; Niklas Larsen; Frederik Madsen; Rasmus Pedersen		QG
2	3	Switzerland; Noah Bogli; Luca Bühlmann; Mats Poot; Valère Thiébaud	3:55.692	
1	4	Great Britain; Ethan Hayter; Rhys Britton; Josh Charlton; Charlie Tanfield	3:49.615	QG
2	4	United States; Grant Koontz; David Domonoske; Anders Johnson; Brendan Rhim	3:54.887	

- QG = qualified for gold medal final
- QB = qualified for bronze medal final

=== Finals ===
The finals were started on 16 October at 19:44.

Rank	Nation	Time	Notes
Gold medal race
1st place, gold medalist(s)	Denmark; Tobias Hansen; Carl-Frederik Bévort; Niklas Larsen; Frederik Madsen	3:45.642	
2nd place, silver medalist(s)	Great Britain; Ethan Hayter; Josh Charlton; Charlie Tanfield; Oliver Wood	3:45.963	
Bronze medal race
3rd place, bronze medalist(s)	Germany; Tim Torn Teutenberg; Benjamin Boos; Ben Jochum; Bruno Keßler	3:52.707	
4	Japan; Shunsuke Imamura; Naoki Kojima; Kazushige Kuboki; Shoi Matsuda	Did not finish	
