= Ben Jochum =

German cyclist

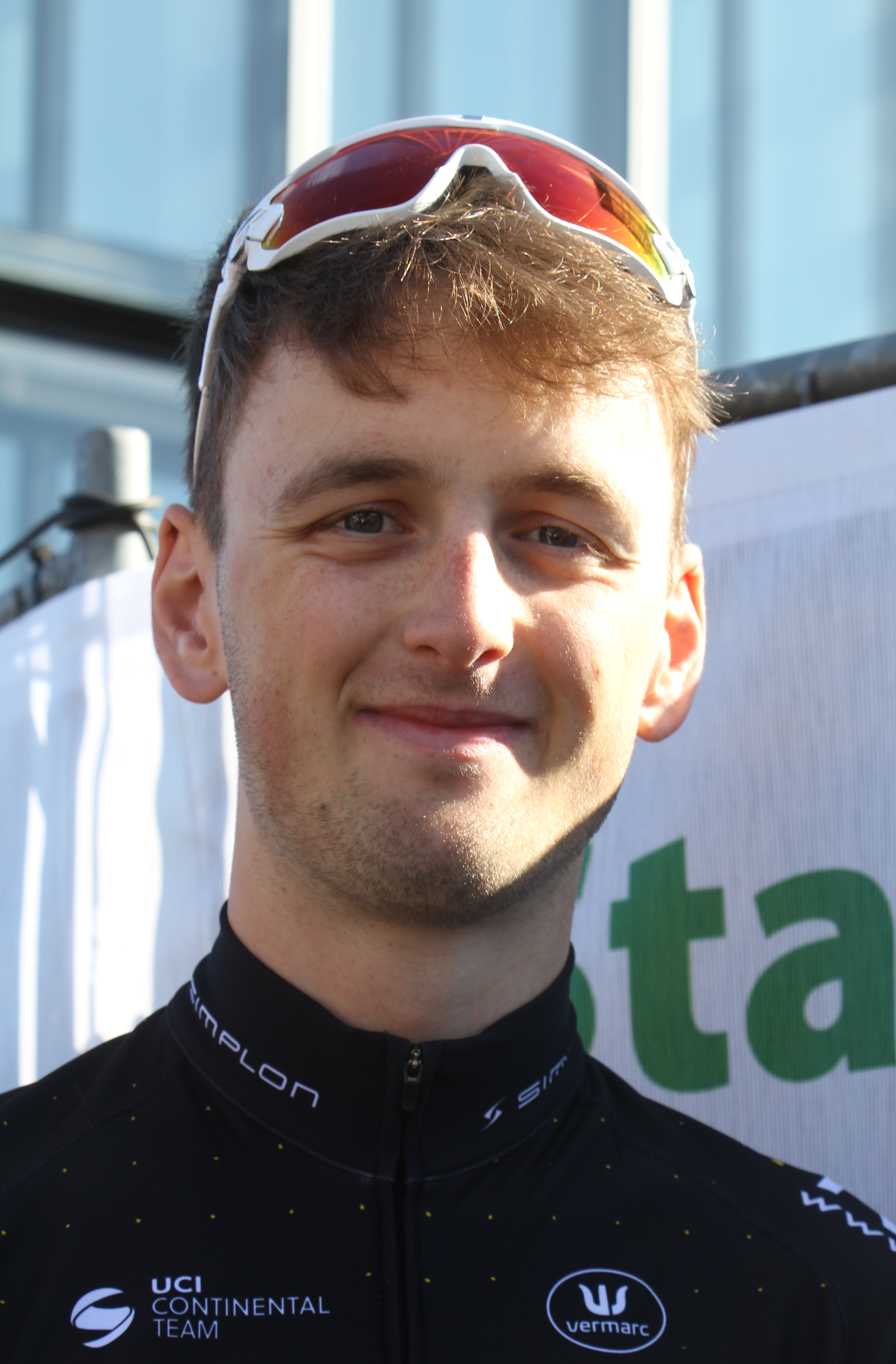
- Jochum in 2024

Personal information
- Full name: Ben Felix Jochum
- Born: 30 January 2004 (age 22) Wuppertal, Germany

Cycling career
- Sport: Cycling
- Current team: Team Lotto–Kern Haus Outlet Montabaur
- Disciplines: Road; Track
- Role: Rider

Amateur team
- 2021–2022: Rose Team NRW

Professional team
- 2023–: Team Lotto–Kern Haus
Medal record
Men's track cycling
Representing Germany
World Championships
Bronze medal – third place	2024 Ballerup	Team pursuit
European Under-23 Championships
Silver medal – second place	2025 Anadia	Team pursuit

Ben Felix Jochum (born 30 January 2004) is a German cyclist, who currently rides for UCI Continental team Team Lotto–Kern Haus Outlet Montabaur.

In 2024, he won the bronze medal in the team pursuit at the elite UCI World Championships.

== Major results ==
=== Track ===
2021
1st Team pursuit, UCI World Junior Championships
2022
1st Team pursuit, National Junior Championships
UCI World Junior Championships

2nd Team pursuit
3rd Individual pursuit

UEC European Junior Championships

2nd Individual pursuit
2nd Team pursuit

2023
2nd Team pursuit, National Championships
2024
2nd Team pursuit, National Championships
3rd Team pursuit, UCI World Championships
3rd Team pursuit, UEC European Under-23 Championships
