= Benjamin Boos =

German cyclist

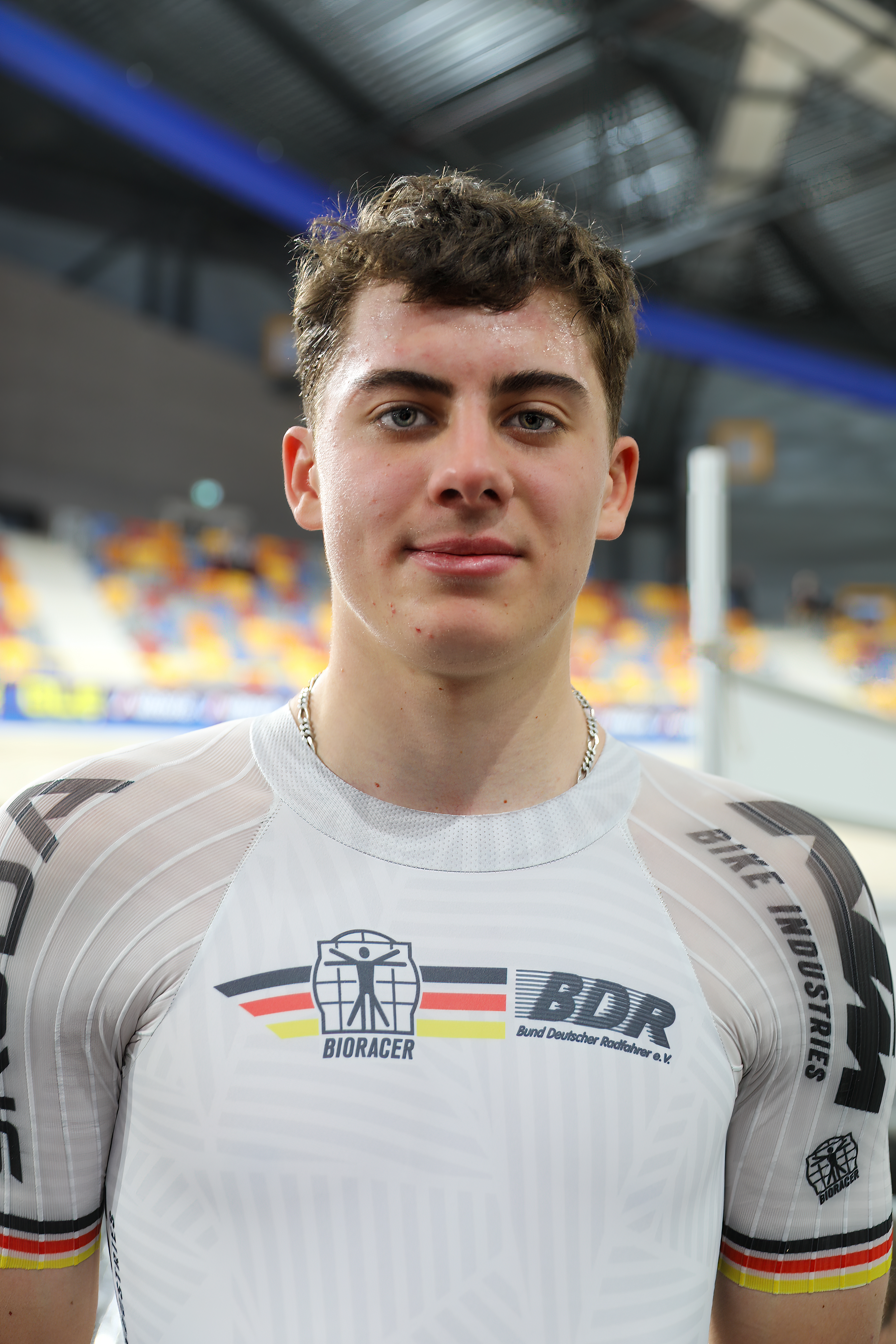
- Boos in 2024

Personal information
- Born: 7 August 2003 (age 23) Singen, Germany
- Height: 1.88 m (6 ft 2 in)

Cycling career
- Sport: Cycling
- Current team: Rad-Net Oßwald
- Disciplines: Road; Track
- Role: Rider

Amateur teams
- 2020: LV Baden
- 2021: Stevens Junior Team Thüringen

Professional teams
- 2022: Leopard Pro Cycling
- 2023–: Rad-Net Oßwald
Medal record
Men's track cycling
Representing Germany
World Championships
Bronze medal – third place	2024 Ballerup	Team pursuit
European Under-23 Championships
Silver medal – second place	2025 Anadia	Team pursuit
Silver medal – second place	2025 Anadia	Madison

Benjamin Boos (born 7 August 2003) is a German cyclist, who currently rides for UCI Continental team Rad-Net Oßwald.

In 2021, he was selected as the German Junior Cyclist of the Year. That season, he won the team pursuit at the UCI World Junior Championships.

In 2024, he won the bronze medal in the team pursuit at the elite UCI World Championships.

== Major results ==
=== Track ===
2020
UEC European Junior Championships

1st Individual pursuit
2nd Team pursuit
3rd Madison (with Tim Torn Teutenberg)

2021
1st Team pursuit, UCI World Junior Championships
2nd Individual pursuit, UEC European Junior Championships
2023
1st Team pursuit, National Championships
3rd Madison (with Tim Torn Teutenberg), UEC European Under-23 Championships
3rd Team pursuit, Cairo, UCI Nations Cup
2024
National Championships

1st Team pursuit
1st Elimination

3rd Team pursuit, UCI World Championships
3rd Team pursuit, UEC European Under-23 Championships
