= Grace Lister =

English cyclist (born 2004)

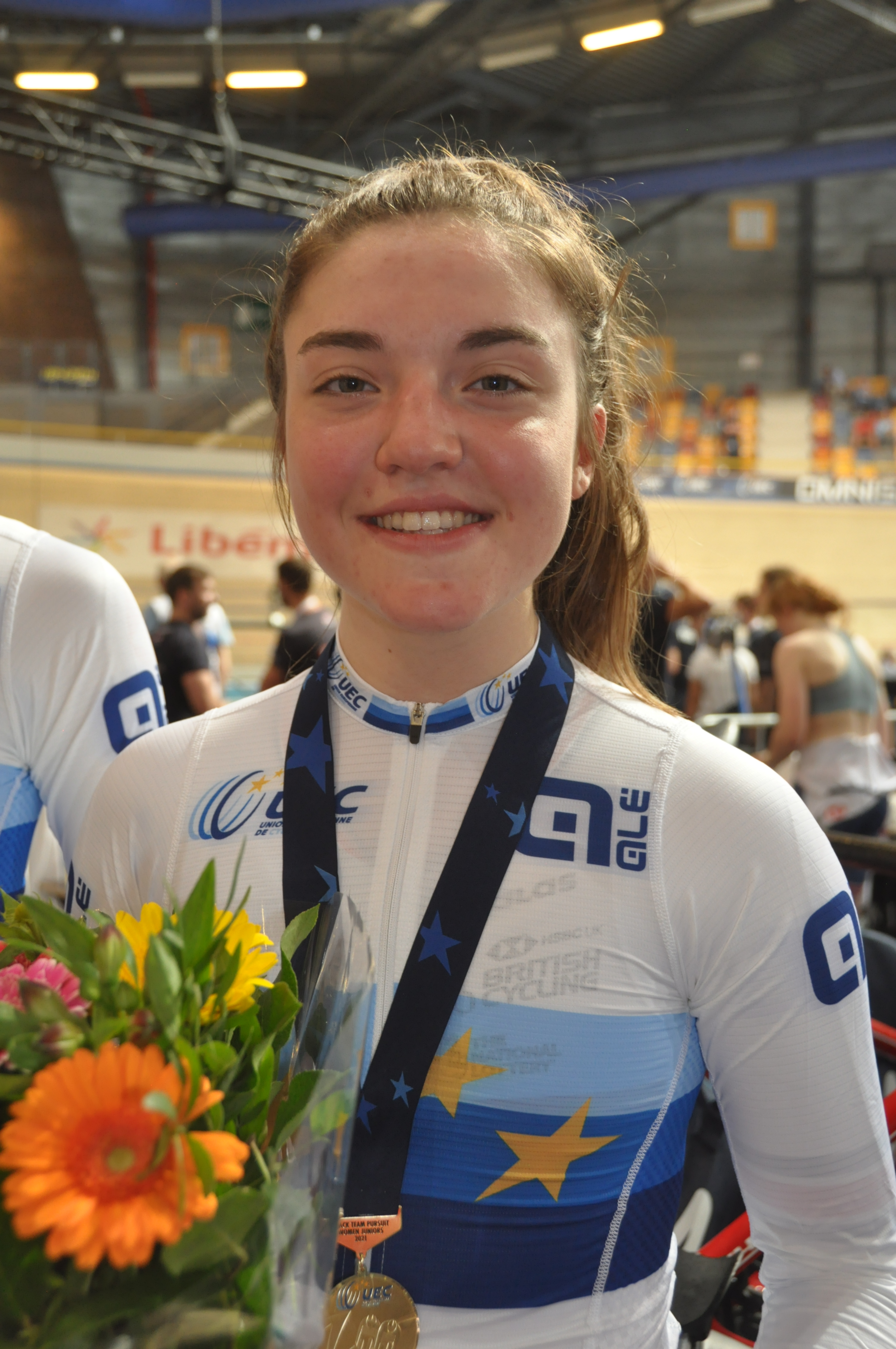
- Grace Lister (2021)

Personal information
- Nationality: British (English)
- Born: 27 May 2004 (age 22) Shrewsbury, England

Sport
- Sport: Track cycling
- Events: pursuit, scratch
- Club: Team Inspired
- Team: Hess Cycling Team
Medal record
Representing Great Britain
Women's track cycling
European Championships
| Bronze medal – third place | 2025 Heusden-Zolder | Team pursuit |
European Under-23 Championships
| Gold medal – first place | 2025 Anadia | Team pursuit |
| Silver medal – second place | 2025 Anadia | Individual pursuit |
World Junior Championships
| Gold medal – first place | 2022 Tel Aviv | Madison |
| Bronze medal – third place | 2022 Tel Aviv | Omnium |

Grace Lister (born 27 May 2004) is an English international cyclist. She currently rides for Hess Cycling Team. She represented England at the 2022 Commonwealth Games. She was a bronze medalist in the women's team pursuit at the 2025 UEC European Track Championships and a gold medalist in the Madison at the 2022 UCI Junior Track Cycling World Championships representing Great Britain.

== Biography ==
Lister rode for Wolverhampton Wheelers before joining Brother UK-Orientation Marketing. She started riding aged 6 and joined the British Cycling programme in 2021.

She won the gold medal at the 2022 British National Track Championships in the team pursuit. In 2022, she was selected for the 2022 Commonwealth Games in Birmingham. She competed in two events; the women's individual pursuit race, finishing in 14th place and the women's scratch race. She won the gold medal at 2022 UCI Junior Track Cycling World Championships alongside Zoe Backstedt in the women’s Madison.

She competed the U23 European Track Championships in Portugal, winning the U23 Team Pursuit alongside Sophie Lewis, Maddie Leech and Kate Richardson.

Lister won her second national title at the 2023 British Cycling National Track Championships, retaining her title in the women’s team pursuit. The following year, at the 2024 British Cycling National Track Championships, she won the team pursuit national title for the third consecutive year, riding for Team Inspired.

She competed for Great Britain at the 2025 UEC European Track Championships in Heusden-Zolder, Belgium in February 2025, where she won a bronze medal at the championships in the women's team pursuit.

== Major results ==
2022
National Track Championships

1st Team pursuit

2023
National Track Championships

1st Team pursuit

2024
National Track Championships

1st Team pursuit

2025
European Track Championships

3rd Team pursuit
