= Groupama–FDJ United =

French cycling team

Team information
- UCI code: GFC
- Registered: France
- Founded: 1997
- Discipline: Road
- Status: UCI WorldTeam
- Bicycles: Wilier
- Components: Shimano
- Website: Team home page

Key personnel
- General manager: Marc Madiot

Team name history
1997–2002	La Française des Jeux
2003–2004	FDJeux.com
2005–2010 (Note: 2005–June 2010)	La Française des Jeux
2010–2011 (Note: July 2010–2011)	FDJ
2012	FDJ–BigMat
2013 (Note: Jan–June 2013)	FDJ
2013–2014 (Note: June 2013–2014)	FDJ.fr
2015–2018	FDJ
2018–2025	Groupama–FDJ
2026–	Groupama–FDJ United

Groupama–FDJ United (UCI team code: GFC) is a French cycling team at UCI WorldTeam level. The team is managed by Marc Madiot, a former road bicycle racer and winner of the Paris–Roubaix classic in 1985 and 1991. The team is predominantly French.

== History ==
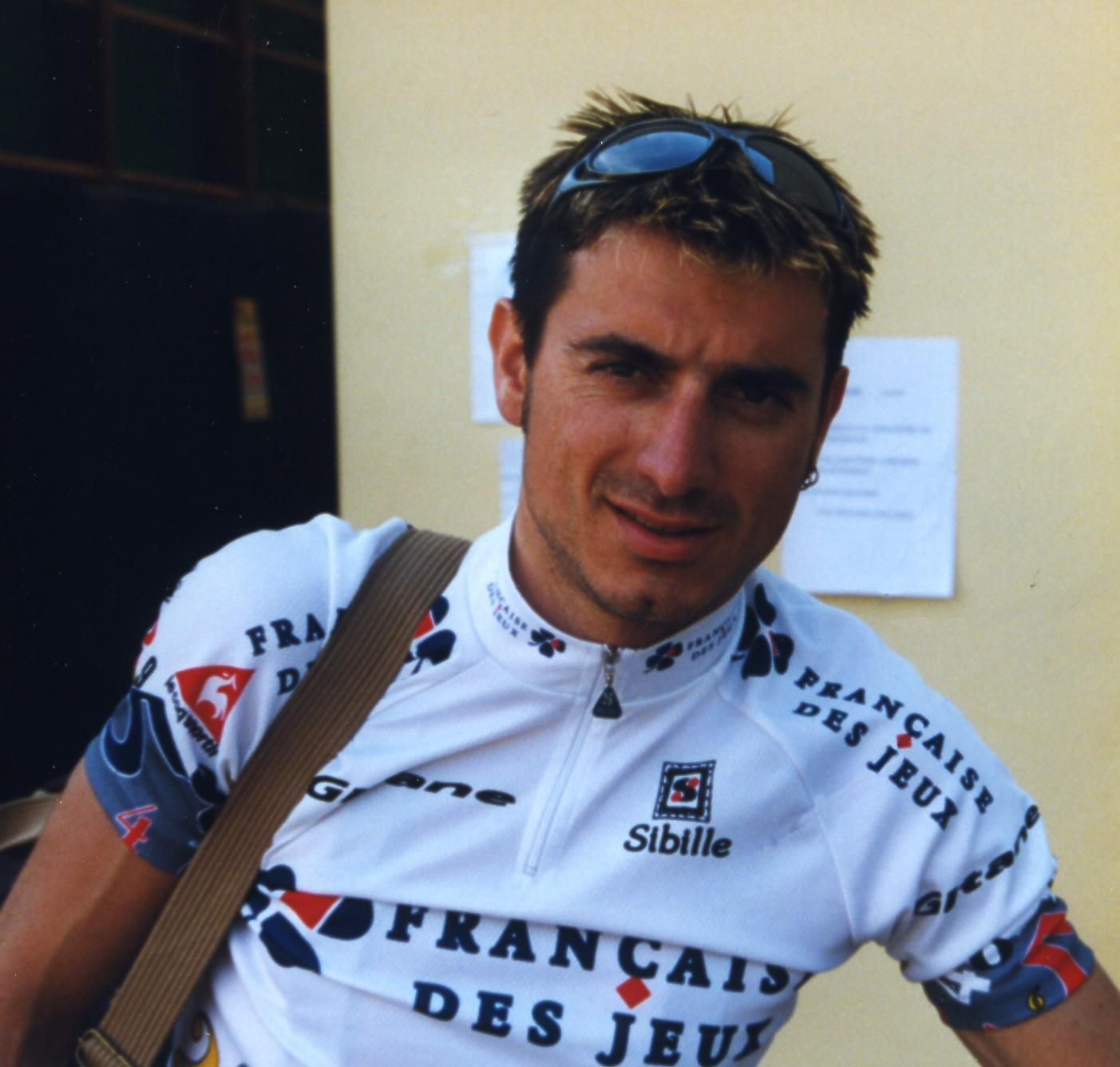
Cyril Saugrain in FDJ jersey in 1999

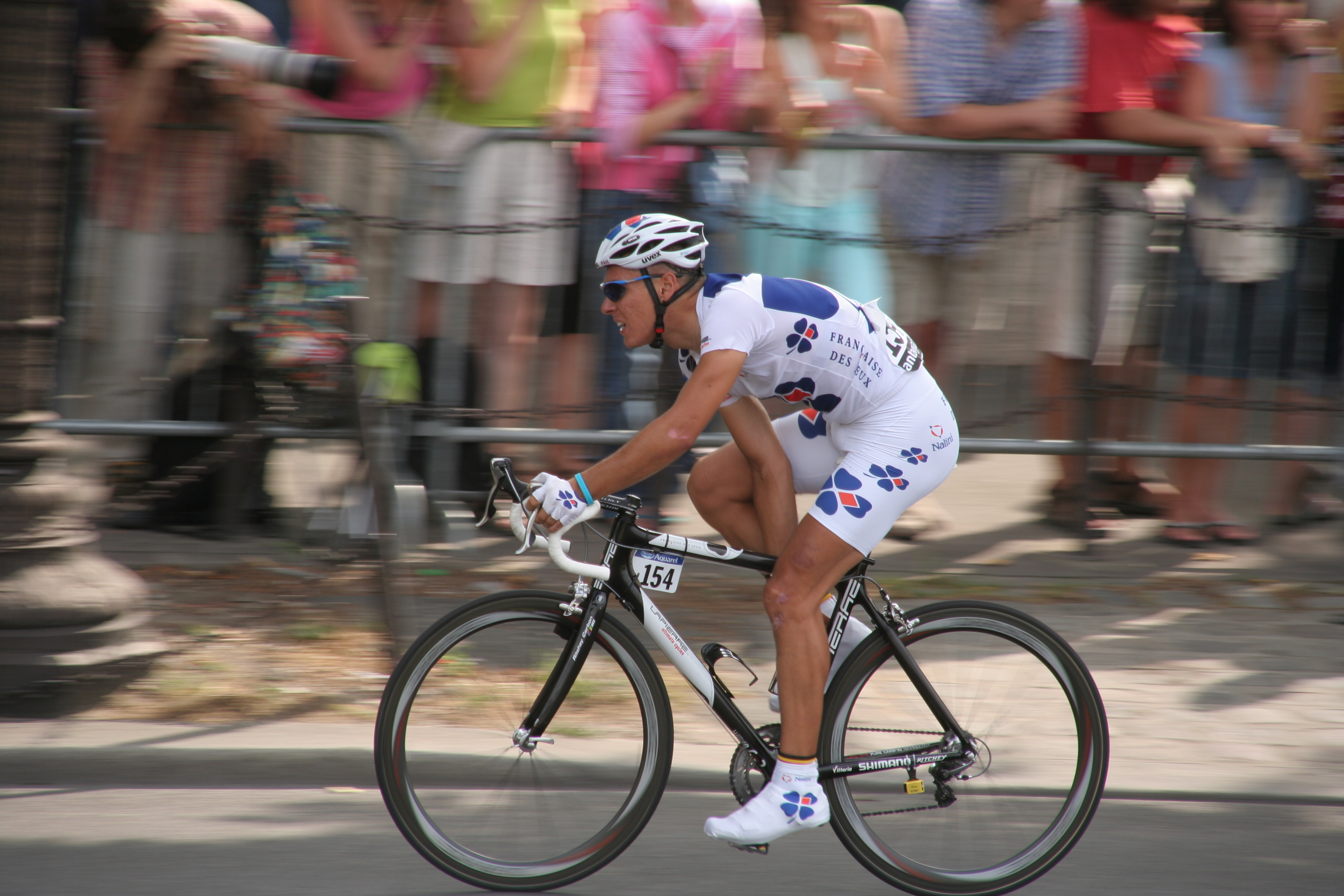
Philippe Gilbert riding for FDJ at the 2006 Tour de France

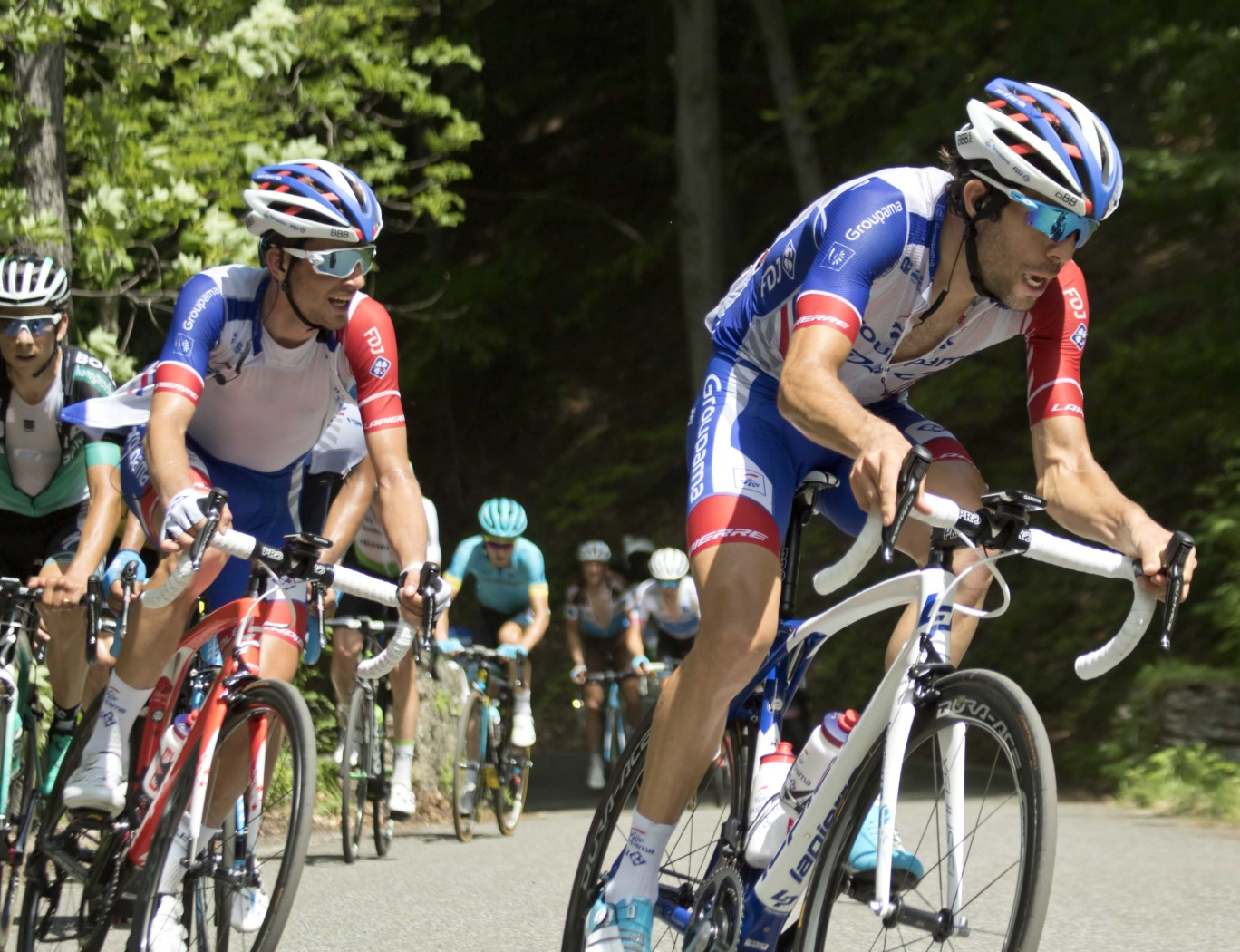
Thibaut Pinot (right) and Sébastien Reichenbach (left) for FDJ at the 2018 Giro d'Italia

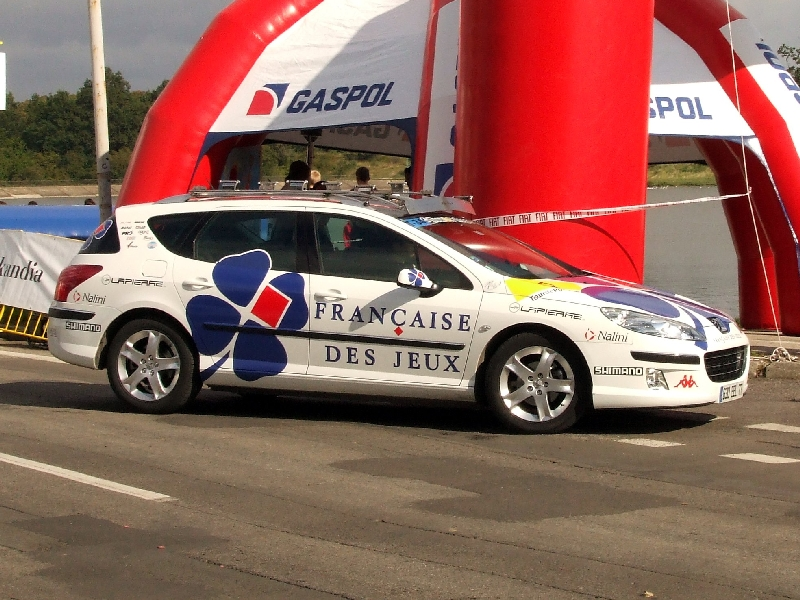
FDJ team car in 2007

The team was founded on the initiative of Marc Madiot after he retired from racing in 1994 following a leg-breaking crash in that year's edition of Paris–Roubaix. After a period in the mid-1990s when the professional cycling scene in France was contracting – resulting in the 1996 French National Road Race Championships elite race being held on a pro–am basis due to the reduced number of professional riders – by the time of the team's launch in 1997 they faced competition for riders in France from fellow newcomers Cofidis as well as the expanding Casino team and the already established GAN outfit.

The team's initial lineup included younger French riders such as teenagers Nicolas Vogondy and Damien Nazon as well as more experienced foreign racers like Davide Rebellin, Mauro Gianetti, Max Sciandri and Andrea Peron. The inaugural squad also included the reigning French national champions in road racing, time trialling and cyclo-cross – Stéphane Heulot, Eddy Seigneur and Christophe Mengin respectively.

In their first season the team only took a total of 13 wins and won the UCI Road World Cup – however these included several high-profile victories such as Frédéric Guesdon's triumph at Paris–Roubaix, a stage win for Mengin at the Tour de France and victories for Rebellin at the Clásica de San Sebastián and Züri-Metzgete.

In the 2003 edition of Tour de France, Australian individual time trial specialist Bradley McGee won the prologue stage to wear the yellow jersey for a few days. McGee was also able to win the prologue of the following year's Giro d'Italia, wore the pink jersey for three days and finished the race in the top ten (finishing eighth). Sprinter Baden Cooke won the green jersey for the points competition.

On 31 October 2012, it emerged that BigMat would no longer sponsor the team, with the team choosing to focus on finding another co-sponsor for the 2014 season.

== Sponsorship ==
The team has been sponsored by Française des Jeux – the operator of France's national lottery – since its founding in 1997. Française des Jeux owns a majority of shares in the team, and the team is based in a warehouse owned by Française des Jeux on the outskirts of Paris: according to Madiot the team and the sponsor have a close working relationship.

The team was named FDJeux.com in 2003 and 2004, then renamed Française des Jeux, supposedly to avoid bad luck, until July 2010, when the name was simplified to its initials. Prior to the 2012 season, French building merchants BigMat joined the team as co-sponsors, becoming FDJ–BigMat, contributing €2 million to the team.

Following the departure of BigMat, the team renamed itself FDJ.fr. At the end of 2017, the team announced that they secured a sponsorship deal with French insurance group Groupama for the 2018 season, becoming Groupama–FDJ, contributing investment that increased the team's budget from €16 million to €20 million for next season.

== Doping ==
In February 2019, Austrian newspaper Kronen Zeitung broke news that a number of professional cyclists had been implicated in the doping scandal uncovered at the 2019 FIS Nordic World Ski Championships. Georg Preidler confessed to having his blood extracted for a possible transfusion. On 3 March, Preidler confessed to Austrian police, whilst also terminating his contract with the team via email. Preidler was due to race during the previous weekend, later admitting to having his blood drawn on two occasions late in 2018. The team then contacted the Union Cycliste Internationale (UCI), the French Anti-Doping Agency (French: Agence française de lutte contre le dopage) and the Mouvement pour un cyclisme crédible (MPCC; English: Movement for Credible Cycling).

== Team roster ==
As of 5 May 2026.

Rider	Date of birth
Cyril Barthe (FRA)	14 February 1996 (age 30)
Clément Berthet (FRA)	2 October 1997 (age 28)
Lewis Bower (NZL)	14 October 2004 (age 21)
Clément Braz Afonso (FRA)	8 November 1999 (age 26)
Rémi Cavagna (FRA)	10 August 1995 (age 31)
Ewen Costiou (FRA)	10 November 2002 (age 23)
Maxime Decomble (FRA)	16 July 2005 (age 21)
Tom Donnenwirth (FRA)	19 January 1997 (age 29)
Titouan Fontaine (FRA)	20 June 2005 (age 21)
David Gaudu (FRA)	10 October 1996 (age 29)
Kévin Geniets (LUX)	9 January 1997 (age 29)
Lorenzo Germani (ITA)	3 March 2002 (age 24)
Romain Grégoire (FRA)	21 January 2003 (age 23)
Thibaud Gruel (FRA)	1 May 2004 (age 22)
Axel Huens (FRA)	5 September 2001 (age 25)

Rider	Date of birth
Johan Jacobs (SUI)	1 March 1997 (age 29)
Josh Kench (NZL)	6 May 2001 (age 25)
Olivier Le Gac (FRA)	27 August 1993 (age 33)
Valentin Madouas (FRA)	12 July 1996 (age 30)
Guillaume Martin (FRA)	3 June 1993 (age 33)
Matteo Milan (ITA)	22 January 2003 (age 23)
Rudy Molard (FRA)	17 September 1989 (age 36)
Quentin Pacher (FRA)	6 January 1992 (age 34)
Enzo Paleni (FRA)	30 May 2002 (age 24)
Paul Penhoët (FRA)	28 December 2001 (age 24)
Rémy Rochas (FRA)	18 May 1996 (age 30)
Brieuc Rolland (FRA)	13 August 2003 (age 23)
Clément Russo (FRA)	20 January 1995 (age 31)
Bastien Tronchon (FRA)	29 March 2002 (age 24)

== Continental & National champions ==
1998
French Cyclo-cross Christophe Mengin
2002
French Road Race Nicolas Vogondy
2004
Australian Road Race Matthew Wilson
Swedish Time Trial Thomas Löfkvist
French Track (Individual pursuit) Nicolas Vogondy
2005
French Cyclo-cross Francis Mourey
Finnish Road Race Jussi Veikkanen
French Track (Team pursuit) Nicolas Vogondy
2006
Finnish Road Race Jussi Veikkanen
Finnish Cyclo-cross Jussi Veikkanen
Swedish Time Trial Gustav Larsson
Swedish Road Race Thomas Löfkvist
French Track (Team pursuit) Mathieu Ladagnous
French Track (Team pursuit) Mickaël Delage
2007
French Cyclo-cross Francis Mourey
French Time Trial Benoît Vaugrenard
2008
French Cyclo-cross Francis Mourey
Belarusian Road Race Yauheni Hutarovich
Finnish Road Race Jussi Veikkanen
2009
Belarusian Road Race Yauheni Hutarovich
2010
Finnish Road Race Jussi Veikkanen
2011
French Cyclo-cross Francis Mourey
French Track (Individual pursuit) Mathieu Ladagnous
U23 World Road Race, Arnaud Démare
2012
Belarusian Road Race Yauheni Hutarovich
French Road Race Nacer Bouhanni
2013
Finnish Road Race Jussi Veikkanen
French Cyclo-cross Francis Mourey
French Road Race Arthur Vichot
2014
Finnish Road Race Jussi Veikkanen
French Cyclo-cross Francis Mourey
French Road Race Arnaud Démare
2016
French Road Race Arthur Vichot
French Time Trial Thibaut Pinot
Lithuanian Time Trial Ignatas Konovalovas
2017
Swedish Time Trial Tobias Ludvigsson
Lithuanian Time Trial Ignatas Konovalovas
French Road Race Arnaud Démare
Lithuanian Road Race Ignatas Konovalovas
2018
Swedish Time Trial Tobias Ludvigsson
Canadian Road Race Antoine Duchesne
Austrian Time Trial Georg Preidler
Swiss Road Race Steve Morabito
French Road Race Anthony Roux
French U23 Time Trial Alexys Brunel
2019
Swiss Time Trial Stefan Küng
French Time Trial Benjamin Thomas
Luxembourg U23 Time Trial Kevin Geniets
Swiss Road Race Sébastien Reichenbach
Swedish Time Trial Tobias Ludvigsson
European Track (Omnium) Benjamin Thomas
2020
Swiss Time Trial Stefan Küng
French Road Race Arnaud Démare
Luxembourg Road Race Kevin Geniets
European Time Trial Stefan Küng
Swiss Road Race Stefan Küng
2021
Swiss Time Trial Stefan Küng
French Time Trial Benjamin Thomas
Luxembourg Time Trial Kevin Geniets
Luxembourg Road Race Kevin Geniets
Lithuanian Road Race Ignatas Konovalovas
European Time Trial Stefan Küng
2022
French Time Trial Bruno Armirail
Hungarian Road Race Attila Valter
