= LUX Junior Cycling =

American amateur cycling team

LUX Junior Cycling, officially LUX/CTS p/b Specialized for the 2022 racing season, and also simply known as "LUX", was an American amateur junior and women's u-23 cycling team founded in 2012. LUX was formed in southern California and slowly grew to have a national and international presence with members from across the country winning multiple national and world championships. LUX has had multiple notable riders that continued to WorldTeams and ProTeams in their professional careers including Riley Sheehan, Quinn Simmons, Luke Lamperti, and Brandon McNulty. LUX was run by Roy Knickman from 2014-2022.

LUX ceased all operations at the end of the 2022 racing season due to financial reasons.

== National and World Champions ==
2015
Junior Men Time Trial, Brandon McNulty
2016
Junior Men Time Trial, Brandon McNulty
UCI Junior Men Time Trial, Brandon McNulty
2018
Junior Men Time Trial, Quinn Simmons
Junior Men Road Race, Quinn Simmons
2019
Junior Women Time Trial, Zoe Ta-Perez
Junior Men Time Trial, Quinn Simmons
Junior Road Race, Gianni Lamperti
Junior Men Criterium, Quinn Simmons
15-16 Men Criterium, Colby Simmons
13-14 Women Criterium, Lily Mcleod
UCI Junior Men Road Race, Quinn Simmons
2021
Junior Women Time Trial, Olivia Cummins
Junior Women Road Race, Makayla Macpherson
Junior Women Criterium, Kaia Schmid
Junior Men Time Trial, Cole Kessler
Junior Men Road Race, Colby Simmons
2022
Junior Women Time Trial, Katherine Sarkisov
Junior Women Road Race, Katherine Sarkisov
Junior Men Time Trial, Alex Gustin
Junior Men Road Race, Viggo Moore

== Roster ==
2022 Roster
Riders	Age
CJ Burford	17
Nolan Church	16
Caitlin Conyers	32
Olivia Cummins	19
Mack Dorf	18
Aubrey Drummond	20
Luke Fetzer	17
Alex Gustin	18
Kayla Hankins	19
Cassidy Hickey	19
Jack Makahon	17
Jesse Marris	18
Viggo Moore	18
Jade Rohde	16
Katherine Sarkisov	18
Zoe Ta-Perez	20
Claire Windsor	22
