= Bruno Keßler =

German cyclist (born 2005)

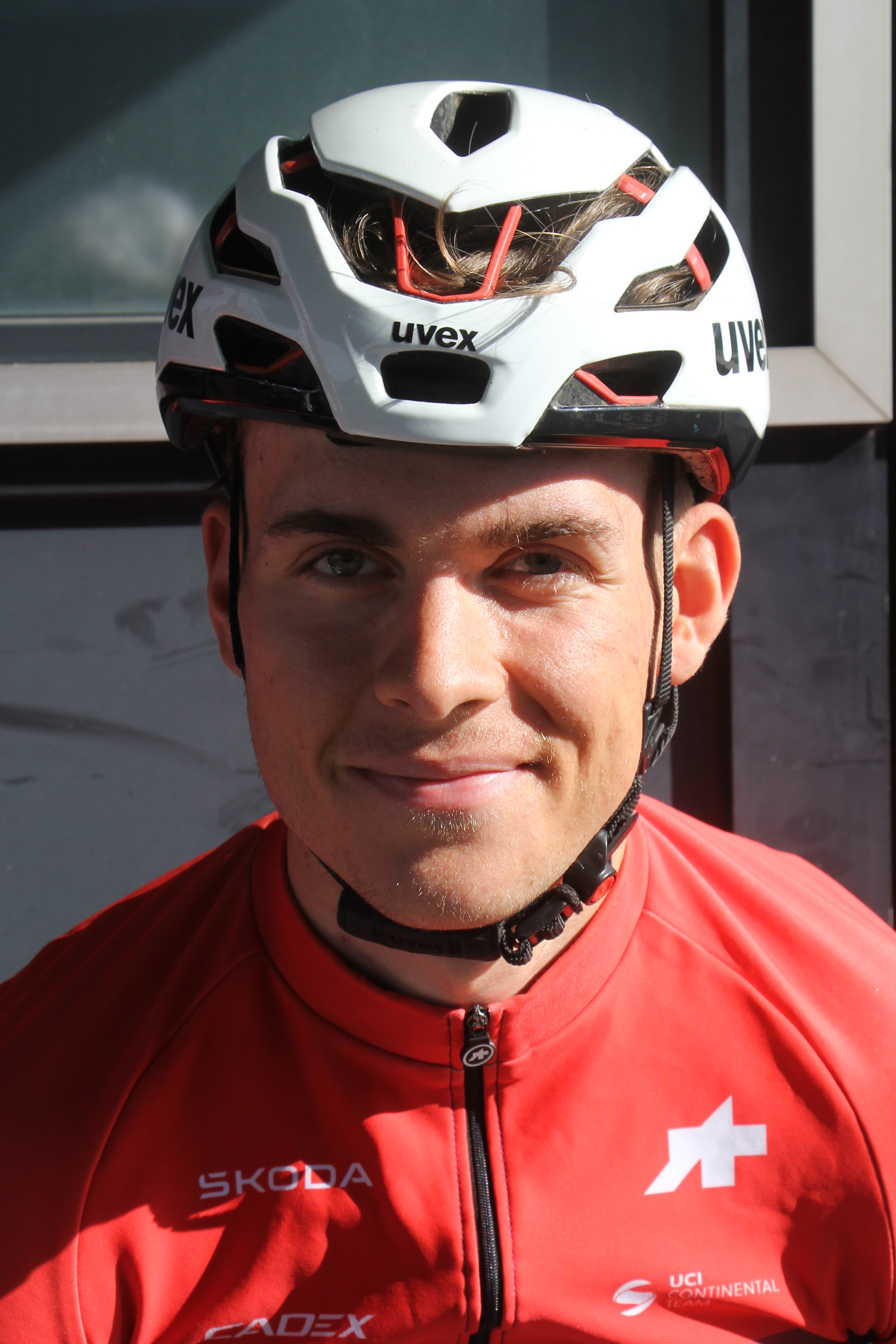
- Keßler in 2024

Personal information
- Born: 9 September 2005 (age 21) Leipzig, Germany

Cycling career
- Sport: Cycling
- Current team: Rad-Net Oßwald
- Disciplines: Road; Track
- Role: Rider

Amateur team
- 2022–2023: Junioren Schwalbe Team Sachsen

Professional team
- 2024–: Rad-Net Oßwald
Medal record
Men's track cycling
Representing Germany
World Championships
Bronze medal – third place	2024 Ballerup	Team pursuit
European Under-23 Championships
Silver medal – second place	2025 Anadia	Team pursuit
Silver medal – second place	2025 Anadia	Madison

Bruno Keßler (born 9 September 2005) is a German cyclist, who currently rides for UCI Continental team Rad-Net Oßwald.

In 2024, he won the bronze medal in the team pursuit at the elite UCI World Championships.

== Major results ==
=== Track ===
2022
UCI World Junior Championships

1st Points race
2nd Team pursuit
3rd Madison (with Jasper Schröder)

National Junior Championships

1st Omnium
1st Madison
1st Points race

2nd Team pursuit, UEC European Junior Championships
2023
National Junior Championships

1st Individual pursuit
1st Elimination

UCI World Junior Championships

2nd Team pursuit
3rd Omnium

2024
3rd Team pursuit, UCI World Championships
3rd Team pursuit, UEC European Under-23 Championships
