= Lara Lallemant =

French cyclist (born 2004)

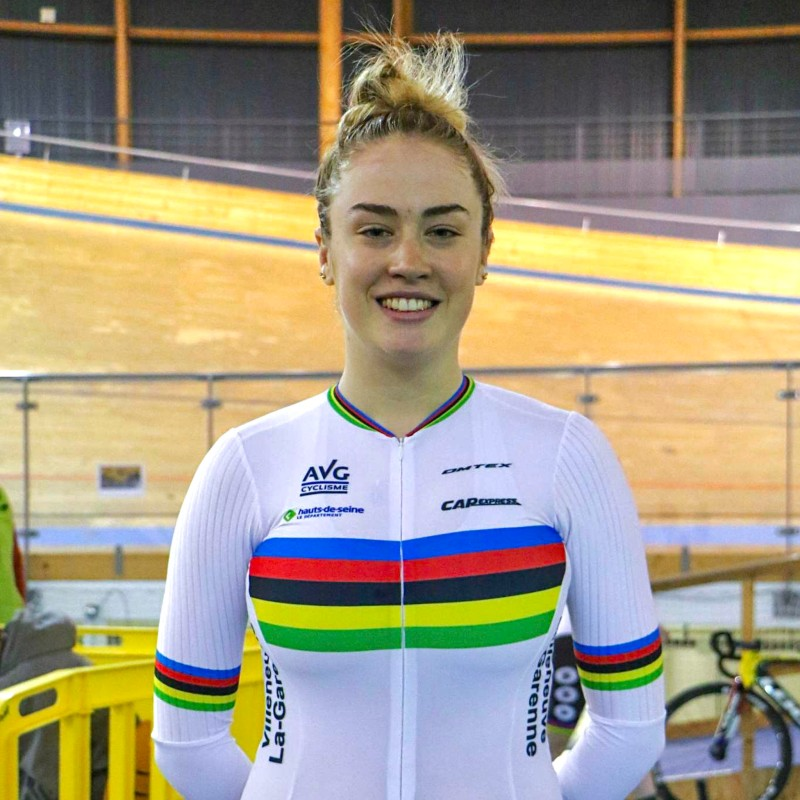
- Lallemant in 2022

Personal information
- Nationality: French
- Born: 6 February 2004 (age 22)

Sport
- Sport: Cycling
Medal record
Women's para-cycling
Representing France
Road World Championships
Bronze medal – third place	2025 Ronse	Time trial B

Lara Lallemant (born 6 February 2004) is a French cyclist who serves as a sighted pilot for blind cyclist Anne-Sophie Centis.

== Career ==
In August 2025, Lallemant represented France at the 2025 UCI Para-cycling Road World Championships and won a bronze medal in the time trial B event with a time of 31:48.23, along with Anne-Sophie Centis.
